= List of minor planets: 579001–580000 =

The following is a partial list of minor planets, running from minor-planet number 579001 through 580000, inclusive. The primary data for this and other partial lists is based on JPL's "Small-Body Orbital Elements" and data available from the Minor Planet Center. Critical list information is also provided by the MPC, unless otherwise specified from Lowell Observatory. A detailed description of the table's columns and additional sources are given on the main page including a complete list of every page in this series, and a statistical break-up on the dynamical classification of minor planets.

Also see the summary list of all named bodies in numerical and alphabetical order, and the corresponding naming citations for the number range of this particular list. New namings may only be added to this list after official publication, as the preannouncement of names is condemned by the Working Group for Small Bodies Nomenclature of the International Astronomical Union.

| Near-Earth obj. | MBA (inner) | MBA (outer) | Centaur |
| Mars-crosser | MBA (middle) | Jupiter trojan | Trans-Neptunian obj. |
| Unclassified |

== 579001–579100 ==
| Designation | | | Discovery | | | Properties | | Ref |
| Permanent | Provisional | Named after | Date | Site | Discoverer(s) | Category | Diam. | Ref |
|---|---|---|---|---|---|---|---|---|
| 579001 | 2014 JF_{101} | — | May 8, 2014 | Haleakala | Pan-STARRS 1 | · | 1.1 km | MPC · JPL |
| 579002 | 2014 JZ_{101} | — | May 7, 2014 | Haleakala | Pan-STARRS 1 | · | 1.3 km | MPC · JPL |
| 579003 | 2014 JP_{104} | — | March 28, 2014 | Mount Lemmon | Mount Lemmon Survey | · | 2.3 km | MPC · JPL |
| 579004 | 2014 JR_{105} | — | May 8, 2014 | Haleakala | Pan-STARRS 1 | VER | 2.2 km | MPC · JPL |
| 579005 | 2014 JU_{108} | — | May 2, 2014 | Kitt Peak | Spacewatch | · | 2.6 km | MPC · JPL |
| 579006 | 2014 JV_{108} | — | May 8, 2014 | Haleakala | Pan-STARRS 1 | · | 2.6 km | MPC · JPL |
| 579007 | 2014 JA_{109} | — | May 5, 2014 | Kitt Peak | Spacewatch | TIR | 2.1 km | MPC · JPL |
| 579008 | 2014 JP_{109} | — | May 6, 2014 | Haleakala | Pan-STARRS 1 | · | 3.1 km | MPC · JPL |
| 579009 | 2014 JL_{115} | — | May 6, 2014 | Haleakala | Pan-STARRS 1 | HNS | 1.0 km | MPC · JPL |
| 579010 | 2014 JV_{119} | — | May 3, 2014 | Mount Lemmon | Mount Lemmon Survey | · | 770 m | MPC · JPL |
| 579011 | 2014 KJ | — | February 10, 2014 | Haleakala | Pan-STARRS 1 | · | 1.9 km | MPC · JPL |
| 579012 | 2014 KZ_{1} | — | February 14, 2013 | Haleakala | Pan-STARRS 1 | · | 2.9 km | MPC · JPL |
| 579013 | 2014 KR_{5} | — | March 6, 2008 | Mount Lemmon | Mount Lemmon Survey | · | 2.8 km | MPC · JPL |
| 579014 | 2014 KR_{10} | — | May 21, 2014 | Haleakala | Pan-STARRS 1 | · | 3.0 km | MPC · JPL |
| 579015 | 2014 KG_{17} | — | March 12, 2004 | Palomar | NEAT | · | 620 m | MPC · JPL |
| 579016 | 2014 KW_{17} | — | April 1, 2003 | Kitt Peak | Deep Ecliptic Survey | EMA | 2.4 km | MPC · JPL |
| 579017 | 2014 KZ_{22} | — | November 11, 2012 | Catalina | CSS | · | 1.8 km | MPC · JPL |
| 579018 | 2014 KQ_{23} | — | October 30, 2010 | Mount Lemmon | Mount Lemmon Survey | · | 2.2 km | MPC · JPL |
| 579019 | 2014 KO_{27} | — | September 20, 2011 | Les Engarouines | L. Bernasconi | · | 700 m | MPC · JPL |
| 579020 | 2014 KP_{30} | — | May 4, 2014 | Haleakala | Pan-STARRS 1 | · | 1.3 km | MPC · JPL |
| 579021 | 2014 KW_{34} | — | February 8, 2013 | Haleakala | Pan-STARRS 1 | · | 2.3 km | MPC · JPL |
| 579022 | 2014 KD_{35} | — | January 9, 2013 | Mount Lemmon | Mount Lemmon Survey | EOS | 2.0 km | MPC · JPL |
| 579023 | 2014 KV_{35} | — | October 23, 2011 | Haleakala | Pan-STARRS 1 | · | 3.4 km | MPC · JPL |
| 579024 | 2014 KN_{36} | — | December 26, 2006 | Kitt Peak | Spacewatch | URS | 2.4 km | MPC · JPL |
| 579025 | 2014 KR_{36} | — | August 23, 2004 | Kitt Peak | Spacewatch | · | 3.6 km | MPC · JPL |
| 579026 | 2014 KZ_{36} | — | November 25, 2011 | Haleakala | Pan-STARRS 1 | · | 2.3 km | MPC · JPL |
| 579027 | 2014 KF_{38} | — | April 5, 2014 | Haleakala | Pan-STARRS 1 | URS | 2.7 km | MPC · JPL |
| 579028 | 2014 KH_{38} | — | April 19, 2009 | Kitt Peak | Spacewatch | · | 3.0 km | MPC · JPL |
| 579029 | 2014 KK_{41} | — | May 20, 2014 | Haleakala | Pan-STARRS 1 | · | 2.0 km | MPC · JPL |
| 579030 | 2014 KH_{42} | — | May 7, 2014 | Haleakala | Pan-STARRS 1 | · | 2.7 km | MPC · JPL |
| 579031 | 2014 KS_{42} | — | January 18, 2013 | Haleakala | Pan-STARRS 1 | · | 3.4 km | MPC · JPL |
| 579032 | 2014 KG_{44} | — | April 23, 2014 | Catalina | CSS | T_{j} (2.99) · EUP | 3.0 km | MPC · JPL |
| 579033 | 2014 KM_{44} | — | April 10, 2014 | Haleakala | Pan-STARRS 1 | · | 3.3 km | MPC · JPL |
| 579034 | 2014 KL_{45} | — | May 26, 2014 | Mount Lemmon | Mount Lemmon Survey | H | 440 m | MPC · JPL |
| 579035 | 2014 KG_{46} | — | March 12, 2014 | Mount Lemmon | Mount Lemmon Survey | LIX | 2.9 km | MPC · JPL |
| 579036 | 2014 KQ_{47} | — | October 28, 2010 | Mount Lemmon | Mount Lemmon Survey | THM | 2.3 km | MPC · JPL |
| 579037 | 2014 KV_{47} | — | September 15, 2010 | Mount Lemmon | Mount Lemmon Survey | · | 2.5 km | MPC · JPL |
| 579038 | 2014 KL_{49} | — | October 1, 2005 | Mount Lemmon | Mount Lemmon Survey | · | 630 m | MPC · JPL |
| 579039 | 2014 KC_{50} | — | October 19, 2011 | Mount Lemmon | Mount Lemmon Survey | · | 2.6 km | MPC · JPL |
| 579040 | 2014 KP_{55} | — | February 9, 2013 | Haleakala | Pan-STARRS 1 | · | 1.8 km | MPC · JPL |
| 579041 | 2014 KE_{58} | — | May 7, 2014 | Haleakala | Pan-STARRS 1 | · | 1.7 km | MPC · JPL |
| 579042 | 2014 KE_{60} | — | November 24, 2011 | Mount Lemmon | Mount Lemmon Survey | · | 3.2 km | MPC · JPL |
| 579043 | 2014 KJ_{62} | — | November 14, 2012 | Mount Lemmon | Mount Lemmon Survey | · | 540 m | MPC · JPL |
| 579044 | 2014 KJ_{63} | — | May 21, 2014 | Haleakala | Pan-STARRS 1 | · | 630 m | MPC · JPL |
| 579045 | 2014 KP_{66} | — | October 12, 2004 | Moletai | K. Černis, Zdanavicius, J. | · | 3.9 km | MPC · JPL |
| 579046 | 2014 KX_{70} | — | May 7, 2014 | Haleakala | Pan-STARRS 1 | EOS | 1.2 km | MPC · JPL |
| 579047 | 2014 KM_{71} | — | October 23, 2011 | Haleakala | Pan-STARRS 1 | · | 2.6 km | MPC · JPL |
| 579048 | 2014 KE_{73} | — | April 11, 2008 | Kitt Peak | Spacewatch | LIX | 2.7 km | MPC · JPL |
| 579049 | 2014 KJ_{73} | — | September 11, 2004 | Kitt Peak | Spacewatch | · | 2.1 km | MPC · JPL |
| 579050 | 2014 KT_{82} | — | October 6, 2008 | Mount Lemmon | Mount Lemmon Survey | · | 550 m | MPC · JPL |
| 579051 | 2014 KU_{85} | — | August 6, 2004 | Palomar | NEAT | · | 860 m | MPC · JPL |
| 579052 | 2014 KH_{89} | — | March 9, 2002 | Palomar | NEAT | · | 3.4 km | MPC · JPL |
| 579053 | 2014 KQ_{91} | — | December 30, 2011 | Mount Lemmon | Mount Lemmon Survey | · | 3.4 km | MPC · JPL |
| 579054 | 2014 KA_{92} | — | October 10, 2012 | Mount Lemmon | Mount Lemmon Survey | H | 280 m | MPC · JPL |
| 579055 | 2014 KF_{97} | — | December 1, 2006 | Mount Lemmon | Mount Lemmon Survey | · | 2.6 km | MPC · JPL |
| 579056 | 2014 KS_{99} | — | November 27, 2000 | Apache Point | SDSS Collaboration | ELF | 3.8 km | MPC · JPL |
| 579057 | 2014 KW_{99} | — | May 27, 2014 | Haleakala | Pan-STARRS 1 | H | 360 m | MPC · JPL |
| 579058 | 2014 KE_{104} | — | October 7, 2004 | Palomar | NEAT | · | 3.2 km | MPC · JPL |
| 579059 | 2014 KV_{105} | — | April 14, 2008 | Mount Lemmon | Mount Lemmon Survey | · | 2.0 km | MPC · JPL |
| 579060 | 2014 KC_{106} | — | May 26, 2014 | Haleakala | Pan-STARRS 1 | · | 2.1 km | MPC · JPL |
| 579061 | 2014 KO_{111} | — | May 26, 2014 | Haleakala | Pan-STARRS 1 | TIR | 1.9 km | MPC · JPL |
| 579062 | 2014 KF_{113} | — | May 23, 2014 | Haleakala | Pan-STARRS 1 | cubewano (hot) | 198 km | MPC · JPL |
| 579063 | 2014 KF_{117} | — | June 18, 2015 | Haleakala | Pan-STARRS 1 | · | 2.5 km | MPC · JPL |
| 579064 | 2014 KM_{120} | — | November 25, 2016 | Mount Lemmon | Mount Lemmon Survey | EOS | 1.3 km | MPC · JPL |
| 579065 | 2014 KM_{125} | — | October 28, 2005 | Mount Lemmon | Mount Lemmon Survey | · | 2.5 km | MPC · JPL |
| 579066 | 2014 KQ_{125} | — | May 31, 2014 | Haleakala | Pan-STARRS 1 | · | 1.3 km | MPC · JPL |
| 579067 | 2014 KC_{126} | — | May 23, 2014 | Haleakala | Pan-STARRS 1 | · | 1.4 km | MPC · JPL |
| 579068 | 2014 KQ_{127} | — | May 23, 2014 | Haleakala | Pan-STARRS 1 | V | 430 m | MPC · JPL |
| 579069 | 2014 KP_{131} | — | May 26, 2014 | Haleakala | Pan-STARRS 1 | · | 1.3 km | MPC · JPL |
| 579070 | 2014 LF_{1} | — | May 8, 2014 | Haleakala | Pan-STARRS 1 | H | 250 m | MPC · JPL |
| 579071 | 2014 LE_{4} | — | May 24, 2014 | Haleakala | Pan-STARRS 1 | · | 3.1 km | MPC · JPL |
| 579072 | 2014 LV_{7} | — | May 4, 2014 | Haleakala | Pan-STARRS 1 | · | 2.5 km | MPC · JPL |
| 579073 | 2014 LZ_{16} | — | June 5, 2014 | Elena Remote | Oreshko, A. | · | 730 m | MPC · JPL |
| 579074 | 2014 LM_{21} | — | June 4, 2014 | Haleakala | Pan-STARRS 1 | H | 430 m | MPC · JPL |
| 579075 | 2014 LZ_{23} | — | January 20, 2012 | Kitt Peak | Spacewatch | · | 3.5 km | MPC · JPL |
| 579076 | 2014 LV_{25} | — | May 12, 2014 | Mount Lemmon | Mount Lemmon Survey | H | 410 m | MPC · JPL |
| 579077 | 2014 LP_{28} | — | June 3, 2014 | Haleakala | Pan-STARRS 1 | cubewano (hot) | 273 km | MPC · JPL |
| 579078 | 2014 LE_{29} | — | June 4, 2014 | Haleakala | Pan-STARRS 1 | · | 2.0 km | MPC · JPL |
| 579079 | 2014 LX_{32} | — | June 2, 2014 | Haleakala | Pan-STARRS 1 | · | 3.2 km | MPC · JPL |
| 579080 | 2014 LY_{34} | — | June 5, 2014 | Haleakala | Pan-STARRS 1 | · | 1.9 km | MPC · JPL |
| 579081 | 2014 LJ_{36} | — | June 2, 2014 | Haleakala | Pan-STARRS 1 | · | 2.7 km | MPC · JPL |
| 579082 | 2014 LC_{37} | — | June 4, 2014 | Haleakala | Pan-STARRS 1 | · | 2.7 km | MPC · JPL |
| 579083 | 2014 LQ_{37} | — | June 5, 2014 | Haleakala | Pan-STARRS 1 | HYG | 2.1 km | MPC · JPL |
| 579084 | 2014 MC_{2} | — | May 7, 2014 | Haleakala | Pan-STARRS 1 | · | 1.9 km | MPC · JPL |
| 579085 | 2014 MD_{4} | — | July 11, 2007 | Lulin | LUSS | · | 1.0 km | MPC · JPL |
| 579086 | 2014 MZ_{7} | — | July 8, 2003 | Palomar | NEAT | LIX | 3.7 km | MPC · JPL |
| 579087 | 2014 MU_{10} | — | June 2, 2014 | Haleakala | Pan-STARRS 1 | · | 2.8 km | MPC · JPL |
| 579088 | 2014 MW_{10} | — | June 2, 2014 | Haleakala | Pan-STARRS 1 | · | 3.1 km | MPC · JPL |
| 579089 | 2014 MM_{15} | — | June 29, 2005 | Kitt Peak | Spacewatch | · | 1.5 km | MPC · JPL |
| 579090 | 2014 MY_{15} | — | May 28, 2014 | Haleakala | Pan-STARRS 1 | · | 2.1 km | MPC · JPL |
| 579091 | 2014 MC_{16} | — | May 6, 2014 | Haleakala | Pan-STARRS 1 | · | 1.9 km | MPC · JPL |
| 579092 | 2014 MB_{19} | — | December 18, 2007 | Mount Lemmon | Mount Lemmon Survey | H | 380 m | MPC · JPL |
| 579093 | 2014 MV_{21} | — | June 23, 2014 | Mount Lemmon | Mount Lemmon Survey | · | 2.5 km | MPC · JPL |
| 579094 | 2014 MK_{22} | — | April 9, 2010 | Mount Lemmon | Mount Lemmon Survey | V | 560 m | MPC · JPL |
| 579095 | 2014 MC_{23} | — | May 7, 2014 | Haleakala | Pan-STARRS 1 | · | 3.0 km | MPC · JPL |
| 579096 | 2014 MZ_{25} | — | May 24, 2000 | Kitt Peak | Spacewatch | · | 560 m | MPC · JPL |
| 579097 | 2014 MU_{26} | — | February 26, 2014 | Catalina | CSS | T_{j} (2.98) · EUP | 3.3 km | MPC · JPL |
| 579098 | 2014 MB_{27} | — | April 4, 2014 | Mount Lemmon | Mount Lemmon Survey | L4 | 8.9 km | MPC · JPL |
| 579099 | 2014 MH_{30} | — | November 13, 2007 | Mount Lemmon | Mount Lemmon Survey | · | 1.9 km | MPC · JPL |
| 579100 | 2014 MK_{37} | — | June 26, 2014 | Haleakala | Pan-STARRS 1 | · | 1.6 km | MPC · JPL |

== 579101–579200 ==
back to top

| Designation | | | Discovery | | | Properties | | Ref |
| Permanent | Provisional | Named after | Date | Site | Discoverer(s) | Category | Diam. | Ref |
|---|---|---|---|---|---|---|---|---|
| 579101 | 2014 MA_{38} | — | October 14, 2001 | Socorro | LINEAR | · | 870 m | MPC · JPL |
| 579102 | 2014 ME_{50} | — | June 29, 2014 | Mount Lemmon | Mount Lemmon Survey | · | 1.7 km | MPC · JPL |
| 579103 | 2014 MB_{51} | — | February 3, 2013 | Haleakala | Pan-STARRS 1 | · | 2.2 km | MPC · JPL |
| 579104 | 2014 MH_{51} | — | September 25, 2009 | Kitt Peak | Spacewatch | · | 2.1 km | MPC · JPL |
| 579105 | 2014 MT_{52} | — | May 7, 2014 | Haleakala | Pan-STARRS 1 | · | 1.5 km | MPC · JPL |
| 579106 | 2014 MX_{53} | — | January 19, 2012 | Haleakala | Pan-STARRS 1 | · | 2.7 km | MPC · JPL |
| 579107 | 2014 MM_{59} | — | June 3, 2014 | Haleakala | Pan-STARRS 1 | · | 710 m | MPC · JPL |
| 579108 | 2014 MW_{60} | — | April 6, 2008 | Kitt Peak | Spacewatch | · | 2.8 km | MPC · JPL |
| 579109 | 2014 MK_{63} | — | October 23, 2011 | Haleakala | Pan-STARRS 1 | · | 1.7 km | MPC · JPL |
| 579110 | 2014 MX_{70} | — | June 24, 2014 | Haleakala | Pan-STARRS 1 | DOR | 2.2 km | MPC · JPL |
| 579111 | 2014 MQ_{71} | — | June 30, 2014 | Haleakala | Pan-STARRS 1 | · | 2.2 km | MPC · JPL |
| 579112 | 2014 MS_{72} | — | June 29, 2014 | Haleakala | Pan-STARRS 1 | · | 850 m | MPC · JPL |
| 579113 | 2014 ML_{74} | — | June 22, 2014 | Haleakala | Pan-STARRS 1 | · | 2.1 km | MPC · JPL |
| 579114 | 2014 MR_{78} | — | June 28, 2014 | Haleakala | Pan-STARRS 1 | · | 1.8 km | MPC · JPL |
| 579115 | 2014 MW_{79} | — | June 23, 2014 | Kitt Peak | Spacewatch | PHO | 810 m | MPC · JPL |
| 579116 | 2014 MV_{82} | — | October 8, 2015 | Haleakala | Pan-STARRS 1 | · | 530 m | MPC · JPL |
| 579117 | 2014 MH_{83} | — | June 22, 2014 | Haleakala | Pan-STARRS 1 | · | 1.9 km | MPC · JPL |
| 579118 | 2014 MK_{83} | — | June 18, 2014 | Haleakala | Pan-STARRS 1 | H | 390 m | MPC · JPL |
| 579119 | 2014 MY_{87} | — | June 25, 2014 | Mount Lemmon | Mount Lemmon Survey | · | 730 m | MPC · JPL |
| 579120 | 2014 MA_{88} | — | June 20, 2014 | Haleakala | Pan-STARRS 1 | · | 680 m | MPC · JPL |
| 579121 | 2014 MC_{88} | — | June 30, 2014 | Haleakala | Pan-STARRS 1 | PHO | 710 m | MPC · JPL |
| 579122 | 2014 MQ_{95} | — | June 27, 2014 | Haleakala | Pan-STARRS 1 | HNS | 850 m | MPC · JPL |
| 579123 | 2014 NV | — | January 1, 2012 | Mount Lemmon | Mount Lemmon Survey | EOS | 1.6 km | MPC · JPL |
| 579124 | 2014 NW_{1} | — | May 4, 2008 | Sierra Stars | Dillon, W. G. | · | 2.9 km | MPC · JPL |
| 579125 | 2014 NB_{8} | — | October 27, 2008 | Kitt Peak | Spacewatch | · | 790 m | MPC · JPL |
| 579126 | 2014 NC_{9} | — | January 18, 2012 | Kitt Peak | Spacewatch | · | 3.0 km | MPC · JPL |
| 579127 | 2014 NC_{13} | — | July 1, 2014 | Haleakala | Pan-STARRS 1 | · | 560 m | MPC · JPL |
| 579128 | 2014 NU_{19} | — | November 26, 2009 | Kitt Peak | Spacewatch | · | 4.0 km | MPC · JPL |
| 579129 | 2014 NA_{28} | — | July 2, 2014 | Haleakala | Pan-STARRS 1 | · | 990 m | MPC · JPL |
| 579130 | 2014 NB_{43} | — | September 18, 2010 | Mount Lemmon | Mount Lemmon Survey | EUN | 840 m | MPC · JPL |
| 579131 | 2014 NJ_{50} | — | July 3, 2014 | Haleakala | Pan-STARRS 1 | · | 1.8 km | MPC · JPL |
| 579132 | 2014 NB_{59} | — | August 28, 2003 | Palomar | NEAT | · | 1.1 km | MPC · JPL |
| 579133 | 2014 ND_{59} | — | June 26, 2014 | Haleakala | Pan-STARRS 1 | · | 1.9 km | MPC · JPL |
| 579134 | 2014 NY_{60} | — | August 24, 2007 | Kitt Peak | Spacewatch | NYS | 800 m | MPC · JPL |
| 579135 | 2014 NY_{62} | — | July 7, 2014 | Haleakala | Pan-STARRS 1 | V | 550 m | MPC · JPL |
| 579136 | 2014 NK_{69} | — | June 24, 2014 | Mount Lemmon | Mount Lemmon Survey | · | 590 m | MPC · JPL |
| 579137 | 2014 NS_{71} | — | May 15, 2013 | Haleakala | Pan-STARRS 1 | · | 2.3 km | MPC · JPL |
| 579138 | 2014 NC_{72} | — | February 27, 2012 | Haleakala | Pan-STARRS 1 | · | 2.4 km | MPC · JPL |
| 579139 | 2014 NJ_{78} | — | October 12, 2015 | Haleakala | Pan-STARRS 1 | · | 2.2 km | MPC · JPL |
| 579140 | 2014 OH | — | August 6, 2007 | Lulin | LUSS | · | 620 m | MPC · JPL |
| 579141 | 2014 OS_{7} | — | September 6, 2004 | Palomar | NEAT | · | 810 m | MPC · JPL |
| 579142 | 2014 OR_{8} | — | July 4, 2014 | Haleakala | Pan-STARRS 1 | · | 1.8 km | MPC · JPL |
| 579143 | 2014 OA_{9} | — | October 20, 2011 | Mount Lemmon | Mount Lemmon Survey | · | 590 m | MPC · JPL |
| 579144 | 2014 OV_{21} | — | February 8, 2013 | Haleakala | Pan-STARRS 1 | · | 990 m | MPC · JPL |
| 579145 | 2014 OJ_{22} | — | January 30, 2012 | Kitt Peak | Spacewatch | · | 2.4 km | MPC · JPL |
| 579146 | 2014 OP_{23} | — | July 24, 2003 | Palomar | NEAT | · | 810 m | MPC · JPL |
| 579147 | 2014 OH_{27} | — | February 3, 2012 | Mount Lemmon | Mount Lemmon Survey | GEF | 990 m | MPC · JPL |
| 579148 | 2014 OU_{40} | — | March 16, 2013 | Kitt Peak | Spacewatch | · | 2.3 km | MPC · JPL |
| 579149 | 2014 OY_{41} | — | July 25, 2014 | Haleakala | Pan-STARRS 1 | · | 980 m | MPC · JPL |
| 579150 | 2014 OP_{42} | — | December 22, 2008 | Mount Lemmon | Mount Lemmon Survey | · | 640 m | MPC · JPL |
| 579151 | 2014 OB_{44} | — | July 25, 2014 | Haleakala | Pan-STARRS 1 | · | 1.1 km | MPC · JPL |
| 579152 | 2014 ON_{44} | — | July 4, 2014 | Haleakala | Pan-STARRS 1 | · | 560 m | MPC · JPL |
| 579153 | 2014 OF_{53} | — | January 25, 2006 | Kitt Peak | Spacewatch | · | 800 m | MPC · JPL |
| 579154 | 2014 OJ_{57} | — | July 25, 2014 | Haleakala | Pan-STARRS 1 | · | 1.6 km | MPC · JPL |
| 579155 | 2014 OC_{60} | — | June 27, 2014 | Haleakala | Pan-STARRS 1 | · | 750 m | MPC · JPL |
| 579156 | 2014 OD_{60} | — | September 19, 2009 | Mount Lemmon | Mount Lemmon Survey | · | 2.1 km | MPC · JPL |
| 579157 | 2014 OS_{61} | — | August 23, 2001 | Kitt Peak | Spacewatch | SYL | 3.3 km | MPC · JPL |
| 579158 | 2014 ON_{63} | — | March 24, 2006 | Mount Lemmon | Mount Lemmon Survey | V | 550 m | MPC · JPL |
| 579159 | 2014 OT_{72} | — | November 25, 2011 | Haleakala | Pan-STARRS 1 | · | 740 m | MPC · JPL |
| 579160 | 2014 OQ_{73} | — | May 7, 2014 | Haleakala | Pan-STARRS 1 | · | 2.5 km | MPC · JPL |
| 579161 | 2014 OW_{74} | — | September 18, 2003 | Kitt Peak | Spacewatch | · | 1.0 km | MPC · JPL |
| 579162 | 2014 OS_{80} | — | September 21, 2011 | Kitt Peak | Spacewatch | · | 520 m | MPC · JPL |
| 579163 | 2014 OV_{81} | — | July 26, 2014 | Haleakala | Pan-STARRS 1 | · | 2.2 km | MPC · JPL |
| 579164 | 2014 OH_{83} | — | May 25, 2014 | Haleakala | Pan-STARRS 1 | TIR | 2.7 km | MPC · JPL |
| 579165 | 2014 OC_{85} | — | November 1, 2008 | Mount Lemmon | Mount Lemmon Survey | · | 650 m | MPC · JPL |
| 579166 | 2014 OD_{89} | — | July 4, 2014 | Haleakala | Pan-STARRS 1 | V | 430 m | MPC · JPL |
| 579167 | 2014 OR_{94} | — | January 16, 2005 | Mauna Kea | Veillet, C. | NYS | 1.1 km | MPC · JPL |
| 579168 | 2014 OG_{98} | — | August 16, 2009 | Kitt Peak | Spacewatch | · | 1.3 km | MPC · JPL |
| 579169 | 2014 OO_{98} | — | July 26, 2014 | Haleakala | Pan-STARRS 1 | · | 2.0 km | MPC · JPL |
| 579170 | 2014 OS_{98} | — | November 1, 2011 | Charleston | R. Holmes | · | 750 m | MPC · JPL |
| 579171 | 2014 OJ_{101} | — | February 5, 2005 | Palomar | NEAT | PHO | 930 m | MPC · JPL |
| 579172 | 2014 OU_{107} | — | January 26, 2012 | Kitt Peak | Spacewatch | (43176) | 2.6 km | MPC · JPL |
| 579173 | 2014 ON_{108} | — | June 4, 2014 | Haleakala | Pan-STARRS 1 | · | 570 m | MPC · JPL |
| 579174 | 2014 OE_{110} | — | July 27, 2014 | Haleakala | Pan-STARRS 1 | · | 2.1 km | MPC · JPL |
| 579175 | 2014 OQ_{110} | — | June 28, 2014 | Haleakala | Pan-STARRS 1 | · | 610 m | MPC · JPL |
| 579176 | 2014 OS_{113} | — | September 18, 2003 | Kitt Peak | Spacewatch | NYS | 820 m | MPC · JPL |
| 579177 | 2014 OQ_{117} | — | February 19, 2002 | Kitt Peak | Spacewatch | · | 1.0 km | MPC · JPL |
| 579178 | 2014 OD_{119} | — | June 25, 2014 | Mount Lemmon | Mount Lemmon Survey | · | 2.5 km | MPC · JPL |
| 579179 | 2014 OW_{125} | — | July 3, 2014 | Haleakala | Pan-STARRS 1 | · | 1.6 km | MPC · JPL |
| 579180 | 2014 OO_{127} | — | January 23, 2006 | Kitt Peak | Spacewatch | · | 880 m | MPC · JPL |
| 579181 | 2014 ON_{132} | — | July 27, 2014 | Haleakala | Pan-STARRS 1 | · | 2.3 km | MPC · JPL |
| 579182 | 2014 OU_{132} | — | July 27, 2014 | Haleakala | Pan-STARRS 1 | · | 2.1 km | MPC · JPL |
| 579183 | 2014 OE_{151} | — | January 30, 2012 | Mount Lemmon | Mount Lemmon Survey | VER | 2.1 km | MPC · JPL |
| 579184 | 2014 OM_{157} | — | July 27, 2014 | Haleakala | Pan-STARRS 1 | · | 2.7 km | MPC · JPL |
| 579185 | 2014 OX_{160} | — | July 27, 2014 | Haleakala | Pan-STARRS 1 | · | 920 m | MPC · JPL |
| 579186 | 2014 OE_{161} | — | July 27, 2014 | Haleakala | Pan-STARRS 1 | · | 630 m | MPC · JPL |
| 579187 | 2014 OZ_{162} | — | December 22, 2008 | Kitt Peak | Spacewatch | (2076) | 590 m | MPC · JPL |
| 579188 | 2014 OC_{168} | — | July 27, 2014 | Haleakala | Pan-STARRS 1 | · | 2.3 km | MPC · JPL |
| 579189 | 2014 OC_{170} | — | July 27, 2014 | Haleakala | Pan-STARRS 1 | · | 800 m | MPC · JPL |
| 579190 | 2014 OV_{170} | — | April 10, 2013 | Mount Lemmon | Mount Lemmon Survey | · | 660 m | MPC · JPL |
| 579191 | 2014 OE_{172} | — | March 13, 2010 | Kitt Peak | Spacewatch | · | 510 m | MPC · JPL |
| 579192 | 2014 OE_{175} | — | August 31, 2011 | Piszkéstető | K. Sárneczky | · | 750 m | MPC · JPL |
| 579193 | 2014 OR_{179} | — | April 15, 2010 | Kitt Peak | Spacewatch | · | 660 m | MPC · JPL |
| 579194 | 2014 OY_{182} | — | June 28, 2014 | Haleakala | Pan-STARRS 1 | · | 620 m | MPC · JPL |
| 579195 | 2014 OO_{183} | — | July 23, 2007 | Lulin | LUSS | · | 860 m | MPC · JPL |
| 579196 | 2014 OC_{186} | — | July 27, 2014 | Haleakala | Pan-STARRS 1 | · | 2.1 km | MPC · JPL |
| 579197 | 2014 ON_{190} | — | April 28, 2006 | Cerro Tololo | Deep Ecliptic Survey | · | 800 m | MPC · JPL |
| 579198 | 2014 OD_{213} | — | January 7, 2006 | Kitt Peak | Spacewatch | · | 600 m | MPC · JPL |
| 579199 | 2014 OH_{213} | — | July 27, 2014 | Haleakala | Pan-STARRS 1 | 3:2 · SHU | 4.3 km | MPC · JPL |
| 579200 | 2014 OB_{215} | — | July 27, 2014 | Haleakala | Pan-STARRS 1 | · | 750 m | MPC · JPL |

== 579201–579300 ==
back to top

| Designation | | | Discovery | | | Properties | | Ref |
| Permanent | Provisional | Named after | Date | Site | Discoverer(s) | Category | Diam. | Ref |
|---|---|---|---|---|---|---|---|---|
| 579201 | 2014 OE_{219} | — | May 7, 2014 | Haleakala | Pan-STARRS 1 | · | 2.7 km | MPC · JPL |
| 579202 | 2014 OZ_{219} | — | December 5, 2008 | Mount Lemmon | Mount Lemmon Survey | · | 510 m | MPC · JPL |
| 579203 | 2014 OS_{226} | — | November 24, 2011 | Haleakala | Pan-STARRS 1 | · | 750 m | MPC · JPL |
| 579204 | 2014 OQ_{228} | — | November 23, 2006 | Mount Lemmon | Mount Lemmon Survey | · | 920 m | MPC · JPL |
| 579205 | 2014 OR_{228} | — | July 27, 2014 | Haleakala | Pan-STARRS 1 | T_{j} (2.99) · EUP | 2.6 km | MPC · JPL |
| 579206 | 2014 OJ_{235} | — | March 28, 2014 | Mount Lemmon | Mount Lemmon Survey | · | 1.7 km | MPC · JPL |
| 579207 | 2014 OF_{236} | — | February 21, 2007 | Mount Lemmon | Mount Lemmon Survey | · | 3.3 km | MPC · JPL |
| 579208 | 2014 OX_{236} | — | September 13, 2004 | Kitt Peak | Spacewatch | · | 3.2 km | MPC · JPL |
| 579209 | 2014 OE_{239} | — | September 20, 2003 | Kitt Peak | Spacewatch | MAS | 540 m | MPC · JPL |
| 579210 | 2014 OU_{243} | — | September 6, 2008 | Mount Lemmon | Mount Lemmon Survey | SYL | 3.7 km | MPC · JPL |
| 579211 | 2014 OW_{251} | — | March 16, 2010 | Mount Lemmon | Mount Lemmon Survey | · | 520 m | MPC · JPL |
| 579212 | 2014 OB_{258} | — | July 29, 2014 | Haleakala | Pan-STARRS 1 | · | 550 m | MPC · JPL |
| 579213 | 2014 OE_{258} | — | October 1, 2011 | Mount Lemmon | Mount Lemmon Survey | (2076) | 850 m | MPC · JPL |
| 579214 | 2014 OH_{261} | — | August 18, 2009 | Kitt Peak | Spacewatch | LIX | 3.0 km | MPC · JPL |
| 579215 | 2014 OK_{263} | — | April 11, 2003 | Kitt Peak | Spacewatch | · | 630 m | MPC · JPL |
| 579216 | 2014 OO_{285} | — | October 19, 2011 | Kitt Peak | Spacewatch | · | 670 m | MPC · JPL |
| 579217 | 2014 OP_{289} | — | October 1, 2011 | Mount Lemmon | Mount Lemmon Survey | V | 560 m | MPC · JPL |
| 579218 | 2014 OA_{292} | — | July 29, 2014 | Haleakala | Pan-STARRS 1 | V | 520 m | MPC · JPL |
| 579219 | 2014 OL_{295} | — | November 14, 1995 | Kitt Peak | Spacewatch | · | 480 m | MPC · JPL |
| 579220 | 2014 OP_{295} | — | February 18, 2013 | Kitt Peak | Spacewatch | · | 1.0 km | MPC · JPL |
| 579221 | 2014 OB_{307} | — | November 19, 2003 | Palomar | NEAT | · | 4.6 km | MPC · JPL |
| 579222 | 2014 OJ_{315} | — | October 26, 2011 | Haleakala | Pan-STARRS 1 | · | 640 m | MPC · JPL |
| 579223 | 2014 OT_{337} | — | December 6, 2011 | Haleakala | Pan-STARRS 1 | · | 710 m | MPC · JPL |
| 579224 | 2014 OC_{342} | — | July 24, 2007 | Lulin | LUSS | · | 880 m | MPC · JPL |
| 579225 | 2014 OE_{344} | — | December 26, 2001 | Haleakala | NEAT | PHO | 3.1 km | MPC · JPL |
| 579226 | 2014 OT_{345} | — | August 6, 2007 | Lulin | LUSS | · | 870 m | MPC · JPL |
| 579227 | 2014 OV_{348} | — | October 26, 2008 | Mount Lemmon | Mount Lemmon Survey | · | 620 m | MPC · JPL |
| 579228 | 2014 OT_{350} | — | September 23, 2011 | Haleakala | Pan-STARRS 1 | · | 560 m | MPC · JPL |
| 579229 | 2014 OA_{352} | — | July 7, 2014 | Haleakala | Pan-STARRS 1 | LIX | 2.2 km | MPC · JPL |
| 579230 | 2014 OW_{359} | — | July 7, 2014 | Haleakala | Pan-STARRS 1 | · | 800 m | MPC · JPL |
| 579231 | 2014 OR_{362} | — | April 10, 2013 | Haleakala | Pan-STARRS 1 | KOR | 1.1 km | MPC · JPL |
| 579232 | 2014 OS_{363} | — | October 12, 2007 | Mount Lemmon | Mount Lemmon Survey | · | 960 m | MPC · JPL |
| 579233 | 2014 OJ_{366} | — | March 4, 2010 | Kitt Peak | Spacewatch | · | 520 m | MPC · JPL |
| 579234 | 2014 OE_{371} | — | October 26, 2011 | Haleakala | Pan-STARRS 1 | · | 1.0 km | MPC · JPL |
| 579235 | 2014 OY_{373} | — | September 17, 2003 | Kitt Peak | Spacewatch | · | 2.2 km | MPC · JPL |
| 579236 | 2014 OZ_{373} | — | June 25, 2014 | Mount Lemmon | Mount Lemmon Survey | · | 2.4 km | MPC · JPL |
| 579237 | 2014 OP_{377} | — | July 3, 2014 | Haleakala | Pan-STARRS 1 | · | 640 m | MPC · JPL |
| 579238 | 2014 OY_{379} | — | September 20, 2007 | Kitt Peak | Spacewatch | · | 820 m | MPC · JPL |
| 579239 | 2014 OU_{381} | — | October 24, 2011 | Haleakala | Pan-STARRS 1 | · | 670 m | MPC · JPL |
| 579240 | 2014 OQ_{382} | — | June 30, 2014 | Haleakala | Pan-STARRS 1 | · | 2.1 km | MPC · JPL |
| 579241 | 2014 OM_{390} | — | March 20, 1999 | Apache Point | SDSS Collaboration | · | 790 m | MPC · JPL |
| 579242 | 2014 OD_{401} | — | March 5, 2013 | Mount Lemmon | Mount Lemmon Survey | · | 930 m | MPC · JPL |
| 579243 | 2014 OW_{405} | — | July 25, 2014 | Haleakala | Pan-STARRS 1 | · | 1.6 km | MPC · JPL |
| 579244 | 2014 OC_{411} | — | September 10, 2010 | Kitt Peak | Spacewatch | · | 1.1 km | MPC · JPL |
| 579245 | 2014 OS_{415} | — | July 25, 2014 | Haleakala | Pan-STARRS 1 | · | 810 m | MPC · JPL |
| 579246 | 2014 OX_{415} | — | July 27, 2014 | Haleakala | Pan-STARRS 1 | plutino | 131 km | MPC · JPL |
| 579247 | 2014 OW_{434} | — | July 26, 2014 | Haleakala | Pan-STARRS 1 | · | 2.5 km | MPC · JPL |
| 579248 | 2014 OZ_{447} | — | July 25, 2014 | Haleakala | Pan-STARRS 1 | · | 790 m | MPC · JPL |
| 579249 | 2014 PQ | — | May 7, 2014 | Haleakala | Pan-STARRS 1 | T_{j} (2.92) | 3.4 km | MPC · JPL |
| 579250 | 2014 PS_{1} | — | August 1, 2014 | Haleakala | Pan-STARRS 1 | · | 600 m | MPC · JPL |
| 579251 | 2014 PJ_{11} | — | September 12, 2007 | Mount Lemmon | Mount Lemmon Survey | MAS | 500 m | MPC · JPL |
| 579252 | 2014 PU_{25} | — | October 13, 2007 | Mount Lemmon | Mount Lemmon Survey | · | 670 m | MPC · JPL |
| 579253 | 2014 PB_{35} | — | August 26, 2000 | Cerro Tololo | Deep Ecliptic Survey | · | 640 m | MPC · JPL |
| 579254 | 2014 PE_{37} | — | May 16, 2010 | Kitt Peak | Spacewatch | NYS | 760 m | MPC · JPL |
| 579255 | 2014 PL_{37} | — | October 9, 2007 | Mount Lemmon | Mount Lemmon Survey | MAS | 470 m | MPC · JPL |
| 579256 | 2014 PL_{45} | — | February 15, 2002 | Bohyunsan | Jeon, Y.-B., Hwang, H. S. | · | 620 m | MPC · JPL |
| 579257 | 2014 PQ_{47} | — | December 2, 2004 | Palomar | NEAT | · | 920 m | MPC · JPL |
| 579258 | 2014 PL_{48} | — | November 16, 2003 | Kitt Peak | Spacewatch | MAS | 610 m | MPC · JPL |
| 579259 | 2014 PK_{49} | — | October 8, 2004 | Kitt Peak | Spacewatch | · | 650 m | MPC · JPL |
| 579260 | 2014 PO_{60} | — | May 10, 2014 | Haleakala | Pan-STARRS 1 | · | 2.0 km | MPC · JPL |
| 579261 | 2014 PW_{62} | — | July 28, 2014 | Haleakala | Pan-STARRS 1 | · | 580 m | MPC · JPL |
| 579262 | 2014 PA_{72} | — | October 26, 2005 | Kitt Peak | Spacewatch | · | 1.8 km | MPC · JPL |
| 579263 | 2014 PO_{73} | — | August 3, 2014 | Haleakala | Pan-STARRS 1 | · | 730 m | MPC · JPL |
| 579264 | 2014 PV_{80} | — | June 29, 2014 | Haleakala | Pan-STARRS 1 | V | 420 m | MPC · JPL |
| 579265 | 2014 PW_{80} | — | September 22, 2011 | Kitt Peak | Spacewatch | · | 740 m | MPC · JPL |
| 579266 | 2014 PR_{82} | — | August 15, 2014 | Haleakala | Pan-STARRS 1 | · | 870 m | MPC · JPL |
| 579267 | 2014 PC_{93} | — | August 3, 2014 | Haleakala | Pan-STARRS 1 | · | 2.3 km | MPC · JPL |
| 579268 | 2014 QO_{2} | — | July 15, 2007 | Siding Spring | SSS | · | 830 m | MPC · JPL |
| 579269 | 2014 QV_{3} | — | May 21, 2014 | Haleakala | Pan-STARRS 1 | H | 380 m | MPC · JPL |
| 579270 | 2014 QK_{12} | — | May 7, 2014 | Haleakala | Pan-STARRS 1 | · | 2.1 km | MPC · JPL |
| 579271 | 2014 QH_{15} | — | October 8, 2011 | Charleston | R. Holmes | · | 860 m | MPC · JPL |
| 579272 | 2014 QW_{28} | — | July 10, 2014 | Haleakala | Pan-STARRS 1 | DOR | 2.0 km | MPC · JPL |
| 579273 | 2014 QC_{35} | — | July 1, 2014 | Kitt Peak | Spacewatch | · | 840 m | MPC · JPL |
| 579274 | 2014 QQ_{40} | — | September 11, 2007 | Mount Lemmon | Mount Lemmon Survey | · | 760 m | MPC · JPL |
| 579275 | 2014 QH_{42} | — | March 5, 2013 | Mount Lemmon | Mount Lemmon Survey | · | 740 m | MPC · JPL |
| 579276 | 2014 QK_{42} | — | October 18, 2007 | Kitt Peak | Spacewatch | V | 570 m | MPC · JPL |
| 579277 | 2014 QN_{43} | — | August 20, 2014 | Haleakala | Pan-STARRS 1 | · | 2.8 km | MPC · JPL |
| 579278 | 2014 QD_{44} | — | January 19, 2012 | Haleakala | Pan-STARRS 1 | · | 2.7 km | MPC · JPL |
| 579279 | 2014 QY_{47} | — | March 6, 2013 | Haleakala | Pan-STARRS 1 | V | 570 m | MPC · JPL |
| 579280 | 2014 QR_{50} | — | October 2, 2011 | Bergisch Gladbach | W. Bickel | V | 540 m | MPC · JPL |
| 579281 | 2014 QK_{55} | — | August 20, 2014 | Haleakala | Pan-STARRS 1 | · | 780 m | MPC · JPL |
| 579282 | 2014 QW_{58} | — | February 12, 2002 | Kitt Peak | Spacewatch | · | 2.0 km | MPC · JPL |
| 579283 | 2014 QP_{59} | — | July 28, 2014 | Haleakala | Pan-STARRS 1 | VER | 1.7 km | MPC · JPL |
| 579284 | 2014 QF_{60} | — | February 17, 2013 | Mount Lemmon | Mount Lemmon Survey | · | 570 m | MPC · JPL |
| 579285 | 2014 QV_{62} | — | July 28, 2014 | Haleakala | Pan-STARRS 1 | · | 1.8 km | MPC · JPL |
| 579286 | 2014 QS_{69} | — | November 17, 2011 | Mount Lemmon | Mount Lemmon Survey | · | 640 m | MPC · JPL |
| 579287 | 2014 QC_{71} | — | September 17, 2009 | Kitt Peak | Spacewatch | LIX | 2.1 km | MPC · JPL |
| 579288 | 2014 QJ_{75} | — | August 20, 2014 | Haleakala | Pan-STARRS 1 | · | 2.1 km | MPC · JPL |
| 579289 | 2014 QT_{75} | — | September 11, 2010 | Mount Lemmon | Mount Lemmon Survey | · | 1.9 km | MPC · JPL |
| 579290 | 2014 QX_{86} | — | June 24, 2014 | Haleakala | Pan-STARRS 1 | · | 3.1 km | MPC · JPL |
| 579291 | 2014 QN_{94} | — | February 19, 2009 | Catalina | CSS | · | 1.1 km | MPC · JPL |
| 579292 | 2014 QP_{102} | — | February 2, 2006 | Kitt Peak | Spacewatch | · | 620 m | MPC · JPL |
| 579293 | 2014 QZ_{105} | — | November 1, 2007 | Kitt Peak | Spacewatch | · | 1.1 km | MPC · JPL |
| 579294 | 2014 QE_{112} | — | June 30, 2014 | Haleakala | Pan-STARRS 1 | · | 2.0 km | MPC · JPL |
| 579295 | 2014 QN_{112} | — | August 20, 2014 | Haleakala | Pan-STARRS 1 | · | 2.1 km | MPC · JPL |
| 579296 | 2014 QU_{113} | — | October 1, 2011 | Kitt Peak | Spacewatch | · | 810 m | MPC · JPL |
| 579297 | 2014 QM_{117} | — | March 12, 2005 | Kitt Peak | Deep Ecliptic Survey | NYS | 860 m | MPC · JPL |
| 579298 | 2014 QN_{119} | — | October 24, 2008 | Kitt Peak | Spacewatch | · | 470 m | MPC · JPL |
| 579299 | 2014 QZ_{119} | — | January 2, 2012 | Mount Lemmon | Mount Lemmon Survey | · | 720 m | MPC · JPL |
| 579300 | 2014 QD_{123} | — | July 28, 2014 | Haleakala | Pan-STARRS 1 | EOS | 1.4 km | MPC · JPL |

== 579301–579400 ==
back to top

| Designation | | | Discovery | | | Properties | | Ref |
| Permanent | Provisional | Named after | Date | Site | Discoverer(s) | Category | Diam. | Ref |
|---|---|---|---|---|---|---|---|---|
| 579301 | 2014 QA_{124} | — | September 29, 2003 | Kitt Peak | Spacewatch | MAS | 650 m | MPC · JPL |
| 579302 | 2014 QG_{125} | — | March 6, 2013 | Haleakala | Pan-STARRS 1 | · | 830 m | MPC · JPL |
| 579303 | 2014 QB_{128} | — | July 28, 2014 | Haleakala | Pan-STARRS 1 | · | 670 m | MPC · JPL |
| 579304 | 2014 QB_{130} | — | August 3, 2014 | Haleakala | Pan-STARRS 1 | (116763) | 1.1 km | MPC · JPL |
| 579305 | 2014 QJ_{134} | — | March 30, 2003 | Kitt Peak | Spacewatch | · | 1.0 km | MPC · JPL |
| 579306 | 2014 QX_{150} | — | January 14, 2012 | Catalina | CSS | · | 930 m | MPC · JPL |
| 579307 | 2014 QY_{151} | — | June 3, 2014 | Haleakala | Pan-STARRS 1 | · | 880 m | MPC · JPL |
| 579308 | 2014 QM_{152} | — | May 9, 2013 | Haleakala | Pan-STARRS 1 | · | 970 m | MPC · JPL |
| 579309 | 2014 QB_{161} | — | June 29, 2014 | Haleakala | Pan-STARRS 1 | EOS | 1.3 km | MPC · JPL |
| 579310 | 2014 QX_{161} | — | October 1, 2011 | Kitt Peak | Spacewatch | · | 620 m | MPC · JPL |
| 579311 | 2014 QD_{163} | — | March 2, 2006 | Mount Lemmon | Mount Lemmon Survey | · | 1.0 km | MPC · JPL |
| 579312 | 2014 QF_{163} | — | May 9, 2014 | Haleakala | Pan-STARRS 1 | · | 650 m | MPC · JPL |
| 579313 | 2014 QK_{164} | — | September 29, 2011 | Mount Lemmon | Mount Lemmon Survey | · | 750 m | MPC · JPL |
| 579314 | 2014 QF_{165} | — | September 21, 2003 | Kitt Peak | Spacewatch | · | 2.8 km | MPC · JPL |
| 579315 | 2014 QR_{184} | — | December 13, 2010 | Mount Lemmon | Mount Lemmon Survey | · | 3.6 km | MPC · JPL |
| 579316 | 2014 QC_{186} | — | December 25, 2010 | Mount Lemmon | Mount Lemmon Survey | · | 2.8 km | MPC · JPL |
| 579317 | 2014 QL_{186} | — | September 29, 2003 | Anderson Mesa | LONEOS | · | 1.2 km | MPC · JPL |
| 579318 | 2014 QA_{195} | — | February 15, 2013 | Haleakala | Pan-STARRS 1 | · | 840 m | MPC · JPL |
| 579319 | 2014 QB_{196} | — | August 23, 2007 | Kitt Peak | Spacewatch | · | 720 m | MPC · JPL |
| 579320 | 2014 QH_{197} | — | September 9, 2007 | Kitt Peak | Spacewatch | · | 830 m | MPC · JPL |
| 579321 | 2014 QO_{197} | — | August 22, 2014 | Haleakala | Pan-STARRS 1 | · | 830 m | MPC · JPL |
| 579322 | 2014 QB_{201} | — | October 19, 2007 | Kitt Peak | Spacewatch | · | 1.2 km | MPC · JPL |
| 579323 | 2014 QF_{206} | — | August 22, 2014 | Haleakala | Pan-STARRS 1 | EOS | 1.5 km | MPC · JPL |
| 579324 | 2014 QS_{211} | — | February 28, 2006 | Mount Lemmon | Mount Lemmon Survey | · | 700 m | MPC · JPL |
| 579325 | 2014 QE_{231} | — | September 19, 2007 | Kitt Peak | Spacewatch | NYS | 710 m | MPC · JPL |
| 579326 | 2014 QM_{240} | — | October 24, 2011 | Kitt Peak | Spacewatch | · | 510 m | MPC · JPL |
| 579327 | 2014 QT_{245} | — | February 13, 2013 | Haleakala | Pan-STARRS 1 | · | 840 m | MPC · JPL |
| 579328 | 2014 QV_{246} | — | August 22, 2014 | Haleakala | Pan-STARRS 1 | · | 760 m | MPC · JPL |
| 579329 | 2014 QF_{248} | — | March 19, 2013 | Haleakala | Pan-STARRS 1 | V | 550 m | MPC · JPL |
| 579330 | 2014 QH_{250} | — | December 25, 2011 | Kitt Peak | Spacewatch | · | 1.0 km | MPC · JPL |
| 579331 | 2014 QD_{253} | — | February 5, 2011 | Mount Lemmon | Mount Lemmon Survey | · | 2.4 km | MPC · JPL |
| 579332 | 2014 QP_{255} | — | August 22, 2014 | Haleakala | Pan-STARRS 1 | · | 1.0 km | MPC · JPL |
| 579333 | 2014 QG_{262} | — | March 15, 2013 | Mount Lemmon | Mount Lemmon Survey | · | 1.1 km | MPC · JPL |
| 579334 | 2014 QR_{266} | — | January 21, 2013 | Haleakala | Pan-STARRS 1 | H | 310 m | MPC · JPL |
| 579335 | 2014 QA_{271} | — | October 20, 2011 | Mount Lemmon | Mount Lemmon Survey | · | 850 m | MPC · JPL |
| 579336 | 2014 QJ_{287} | — | August 25, 2014 | Haleakala | Pan-STARRS 1 | · | 2.1 km | MPC · JPL |
| 579337 | 2014 QC_{288} | — | May 3, 2013 | Haleakala | Pan-STARRS 1 | · | 1.1 km | MPC · JPL |
| 579338 | 2014 QD_{292} | — | August 25, 2014 | Haleakala | Pan-STARRS 1 | · | 3.2 km | MPC · JPL |
| 579339 | 2014 QC_{297} | — | February 20, 2006 | Kitt Peak | Spacewatch | · | 1.1 km | MPC · JPL |
| 579340 | 2014 QO_{297} | — | June 30, 2014 | Catalina | CSS | · | 1.2 km | MPC · JPL |
| 579341 | 2014 QH_{301} | — | July 31, 2014 | Haleakala | Pan-STARRS 1 | · | 710 m | MPC · JPL |
| 579342 | 2014 QO_{301} | — | July 31, 2014 | Haleakala | Pan-STARRS 1 | · | 1.0 km | MPC · JPL |
| 579343 | 2014 QP_{303} | — | October 11, 2007 | Mount Lemmon | Mount Lemmon Survey | · | 940 m | MPC · JPL |
| 579344 | 2014 QU_{310} | — | June 24, 2014 | Haleakala | Pan-STARRS 1 | V | 520 m | MPC · JPL |
| 579345 | 2014 QZ_{310} | — | June 28, 2003 | Socorro | LINEAR | · | 1.3 km | MPC · JPL |
| 579346 | 2014 QB_{311} | — | October 19, 2011 | Kitt Peak | Spacewatch | · | 790 m | MPC · JPL |
| 579347 | 2014 QE_{315} | — | October 19, 2011 | Mount Lemmon | Mount Lemmon Survey | · | 560 m | MPC · JPL |
| 579348 | 2014 QJ_{315} | — | January 20, 2009 | Kitt Peak | Spacewatch | · | 1.0 km | MPC · JPL |
| 579349 | 2014 QZ_{317} | — | March 23, 2006 | Mount Lemmon | Mount Lemmon Survey | MAS | 780 m | MPC · JPL |
| 579350 | 2014 QE_{322} | — | September 30, 2003 | Kitt Peak | Spacewatch | · | 980 m | MPC · JPL |
| 579351 | 2014 QW_{324} | — | October 10, 2007 | Kitt Peak | Spacewatch | NYS | 810 m | MPC · JPL |
| 579352 | 2014 QZ_{324} | — | July 30, 2014 | Haleakala | Pan-STARRS 1 | V | 570 m | MPC · JPL |
| 579353 | 2014 QS_{325} | — | March 25, 2009 | La Sagra | OAM | · | 1.2 km | MPC · JPL |
| 579354 | 2014 QB_{326} | — | February 27, 2009 | Kitt Peak | Spacewatch | · | 1.2 km | MPC · JPL |
| 579355 | 2014 QD_{327} | — | September 1, 2010 | Mount Lemmon | Mount Lemmon Survey | · | 1.2 km | MPC · JPL |
| 579356 | 2014 QT_{334} | — | August 25, 2014 | Haleakala | Pan-STARRS 1 | · | 720 m | MPC · JPL |
| 579357 | 2014 QU_{347} | — | August 26, 2014 | Haleakala | Pan-STARRS 1 | · | 2.9 km | MPC · JPL |
| 579358 | 2014 QZ_{350} | — | August 27, 2014 | Haleakala | Pan-STARRS 1 | · | 1.7 km | MPC · JPL |
| 579359 | 2014 QL_{351} | — | August 27, 2014 | Haleakala | Pan-STARRS 1 | · | 620 m | MPC · JPL |
| 579360 | 2014 QD_{354} | — | September 12, 2007 | Mount Lemmon | Mount Lemmon Survey | · | 770 m | MPC · JPL |
| 579361 | 2014 QR_{359} | — | February 2, 2005 | Kitt Peak | Spacewatch | · | 1.0 km | MPC · JPL |
| 579362 | 2014 QG_{367} | — | January 3, 2012 | Mount Lemmon | Mount Lemmon Survey | · | 1.1 km | MPC · JPL |
| 579363 | 2014 QN_{367} | — | August 25, 2014 | Haleakala | Pan-STARRS 1 | · | 1.0 km | MPC · JPL |
| 579364 | 2014 QP_{367} | — | August 25, 2014 | Haleakala | Pan-STARRS 1 | V | 540 m | MPC · JPL |
| 579365 | 2014 QG_{374} | — | October 10, 2007 | Kitt Peak | Spacewatch | · | 720 m | MPC · JPL |
| 579366 | 2014 QY_{380} | — | October 23, 2003 | Apache Point | SDSS Collaboration | · | 920 m | MPC · JPL |
| 579367 | 2014 QR_{383} | — | September 6, 2008 | Mount Lemmon | Mount Lemmon Survey | · | 2.7 km | MPC · JPL |
| 579368 | 2014 QV_{383} | — | September 14, 2007 | Anderson Mesa | LONEOS | · | 970 m | MPC · JPL |
| 579369 | 2014 QQ_{384} | — | September 29, 2000 | Kitt Peak | Spacewatch | · | 950 m | MPC · JPL |
| 579370 | 2014 QW_{387} | — | February 25, 2011 | Mount Lemmon | Mount Lemmon Survey | TIR | 1.9 km | MPC · JPL |
| 579371 | 2014 QN_{388} | — | December 11, 2012 | Charleston | R. Holmes | · | 1.4 km | MPC · JPL |
| 579372 | 2014 QZ_{388} | — | September 17, 2010 | Kitt Peak | Spacewatch | BRG | 1.1 km | MPC · JPL |
| 579373 | 2014 QG_{393} | — | September 26, 2003 | Apache Point | SDSS Collaboration | · | 1.0 km | MPC · JPL |
| 579374 | 2014 QJ_{393} | — | October 23, 2003 | Kitt Peak | Spacewatch | · | 1.1 km | MPC · JPL |
| 579375 | 2014 QP_{396} | — | March 29, 2012 | Mount Lemmon | Mount Lemmon Survey | · | 2.5 km | MPC · JPL |
| 579376 | 2014 QE_{401} | — | January 16, 2005 | Mauna Kea | Veillet, C. | · | 910 m | MPC · JPL |
| 579377 | 2014 QQ_{402} | — | August 22, 2007 | Anderson Mesa | LONEOS | · | 630 m | MPC · JPL |
| 579378 | 2014 QN_{403} | — | September 21, 2003 | Kitt Peak | Spacewatch | · | 1.0 km | MPC · JPL |
| 579379 | 2014 QV_{403} | — | August 28, 2014 | Haleakala | Pan-STARRS 1 | · | 790 m | MPC · JPL |
| 579380 | 2014 QM_{405} | — | January 25, 2012 | Haleakala | Pan-STARRS 1 | · | 4.8 km | MPC · JPL |
| 579381 | 2014 QV_{405} | — | August 6, 2014 | Haleakala | Pan-STARRS 1 | · | 1.3 km | MPC · JPL |
| 579382 | 2014 QA_{411} | — | December 12, 2004 | Kitt Peak | Spacewatch | · | 890 m | MPC · JPL |
| 579383 | 2014 QS_{413} | — | April 9, 2010 | Vail-Jarnac | Jarnac | · | 890 m | MPC · JPL |
| 579384 | 2014 QU_{420} | — | September 26, 2003 | Apache Point | SDSS | · | 990 m | MPC · JPL |
| 579385 | 2014 QP_{421} | — | September 18, 2003 | Palomar | NEAT | · | 970 m | MPC · JPL |
| 579386 | 2014 QZ_{426} | — | October 11, 2007 | Kitt Peak | Spacewatch | · | 890 m | MPC · JPL |
| 579387 | 2014 QL_{430} | — | August 6, 2014 | Haleakala | Pan-STARRS 1 | · | 1.3 km | MPC · JPL |
| 579388 | 2014 QE_{431} | — | March 9, 2005 | Mount Lemmon | Mount Lemmon Survey | V | 540 m | MPC · JPL |
| 579389 | 2014 QR_{434} | — | August 25, 2014 | Haleakala | Pan-STARRS 1 | NYS | 1.2 km | MPC · JPL |
| 579390 | 2014 QX_{442} | — | October 2, 2006 | Mount Lemmon | Mount Lemmon Survey | 3:2 | 4.8 km | MPC · JPL |
| 579391 | 2014 QG_{460} | — | January 20, 2009 | Kitt Peak | Spacewatch | · | 1.1 km | MPC · JPL |
| 579392 | 2014 QH_{461} | — | January 21, 2012 | Kitt Peak | Spacewatch | · | 2.0 km | MPC · JPL |
| 579393 | 2014 QD_{463} | — | October 26, 2011 | Haleakala | Pan-STARRS 1 | · | 950 m | MPC · JPL |
| 579394 | 2014 QT_{468} | — | September 18, 2010 | Mount Lemmon | Mount Lemmon Survey | · | 1.8 km | MPC · JPL |
| 579395 | 2014 QO_{476} | — | August 18, 2014 | Haleakala | Pan-STARRS 1 | V | 490 m | MPC · JPL |
| 579396 | 2014 QJ_{482} | — | October 30, 2011 | Kitt Peak | Spacewatch | NYS | 1.1 km | MPC · JPL |
| 579397 | 2014 QO_{483} | — | August 24, 2003 | Cerro Tololo | Deep Ecliptic Survey | NYS | 880 m | MPC · JPL |
| 579398 | 2014 QY_{483} | — | March 15, 2013 | Kitt Peak | Spacewatch | · | 920 m | MPC · JPL |
| 579399 | 2014 QQ_{489} | — | September 10, 2007 | Kitt Peak | Spacewatch | · | 660 m | MPC · JPL |
| 579400 | 2014 QN_{490} | — | November 4, 2007 | Kitt Peak | Spacewatch | · | 920 m | MPC · JPL |

== 579401–579500 ==
back to top

| Designation | | | Discovery | | | Properties | | Ref |
| Permanent | Provisional | Named after | Date | Site | Discoverer(s) | Category | Diam. | Ref |
|---|---|---|---|---|---|---|---|---|
| 579401 | 2014 QK_{491} | — | December 22, 2008 | Kitt Peak | Spacewatch | · | 1.1 km | MPC · JPL |
| 579402 | 2014 QY_{495} | — | August 23, 2014 | Haleakala | Pan-STARRS 1 | PHO | 880 m | MPC · JPL |
| 579403 | 2014 QC_{497} | — | August 31, 2014 | Haleakala | Pan-STARRS 1 | JUN | 620 m | MPC · JPL |
| 579404 | 2014 QO_{504} | — | August 25, 2014 | Haleakala | Pan-STARRS 1 | · | 2.7 km | MPC · JPL |
| 579405 | 2014 QN_{508} | — | August 25, 2014 | Haleakala | Pan-STARRS 1 | · | 900 m | MPC · JPL |
| 579406 | 2014 QD_{516} | — | August 25, 2014 | Haleakala | Pan-STARRS 1 | · | 550 m | MPC · JPL |
| 579407 | 2014 QU_{522} | — | August 20, 2014 | Haleakala | Pan-STARRS 1 | · | 1.5 km | MPC · JPL |
| 579408 | 2014 QT_{528} | — | November 25, 2011 | Haleakala | Pan-STARRS 1 | · | 640 m | MPC · JPL |
| 579409 | 2014 QD_{536} | — | August 27, 2014 | Haleakala | Pan-STARRS 1 | · | 2.3 km | MPC · JPL |
| 579410 | 2014 RP_{1} | — | July 30, 2014 | Haleakala | Pan-STARRS 1 | · | 750 m | MPC · JPL |
| 579411 | 2014 RB_{2} | — | September 14, 2007 | Mount Lemmon | Mount Lemmon Survey | V | 490 m | MPC · JPL |
| 579412 | 2014 RP_{4} | — | July 8, 2014 | Haleakala | Pan-STARRS 1 | · | 970 m | MPC · JPL |
| 579413 | 2014 RR_{5} | — | February 13, 2002 | Apache Point | SDSS | V | 640 m | MPC · JPL |
| 579414 | 2014 RH_{6} | — | August 25, 2014 | Haleakala | Pan-STARRS 1 | THB | 2.1 km | MPC · JPL |
| 579415 | 2014 RC_{18} | — | September 11, 2014 | Haleakala | Pan-STARRS 1 | H | 510 m | MPC · JPL |
| 579416 | 2014 RV_{20} | — | July 29, 2014 | Haleakala | Pan-STARRS 1 | · | 830 m | MPC · JPL |
| 579417 | 2014 RW_{41} | — | April 24, 2003 | Kitt Peak | Spacewatch | · | 620 m | MPC · JPL |
| 579418 | 2014 RS_{47} | — | August 27, 2014 | Haleakala | Pan-STARRS 1 | · | 1.3 km | MPC · JPL |
| 579419 | 2014 RM_{48} | — | March 5, 2013 | Mount Lemmon | Mount Lemmon Survey | · | 930 m | MPC · JPL |
| 579420 | 2014 RC_{51} | — | November 1, 2007 | Kitt Peak | Spacewatch | · | 780 m | MPC · JPL |
| 579421 | 2014 RW_{67} | — | September 2, 2014 | Haleakala | Pan-STARRS 1 | EUN | 790 m | MPC · JPL |
| 579422 | 2014 RF_{83} | — | September 4, 2014 | Haleakala | Pan-STARRS 1 | · | 890 m | MPC · JPL |
| 579423 | 2014 SN_{5} | — | October 26, 2011 | Haleakala | Pan-STARRS 1 | V | 510 m | MPC · JPL |
| 579424 | 2014 SE_{23} | — | February 14, 2005 | Catalina | CSS | · | 910 m | MPC · JPL |
| 579425 | 2014 SK_{25} | — | August 27, 2014 | Haleakala | Pan-STARRS 1 | · | 820 m | MPC · JPL |
| 579426 | 2014 SG_{31} | — | August 20, 2014 | Haleakala | Pan-STARRS 1 | · | 910 m | MPC · JPL |
| 579427 | 2014 SF_{32} | — | February 22, 2007 | Kitt Peak | Spacewatch | KOR | 1.1 km | MPC · JPL |
| 579428 | 2014 SE_{33} | — | April 19, 2006 | Kitt Peak | Spacewatch | · | 950 m | MPC · JPL |
| 579429 | 2014 SB_{35} | — | February 28, 2009 | Kitt Peak | Spacewatch | · | 970 m | MPC · JPL |
| 579430 | 2014 SU_{42} | — | March 17, 2013 | Palomar | Palomar Transient Factory | · | 730 m | MPC · JPL |
| 579431 | 2014 SD_{43} | — | October 25, 1995 | Kitt Peak | Spacewatch | · | 1.6 km | MPC · JPL |
| 579432 | 2014 SZ_{43} | — | December 10, 2010 | Mount Lemmon | Mount Lemmon Survey | EMA | 2.7 km | MPC · JPL |
| 579433 | 2014 SX_{45} | — | February 2, 2005 | Kitt Peak | Spacewatch | · | 1.4 km | MPC · JPL |
| 579434 | 2014 SA_{50} | — | August 28, 2014 | Haleakala | Pan-STARRS 1 | · | 1.6 km | MPC · JPL |
| 579435 | 2014 SD_{51} | — | December 15, 2007 | Kitt Peak | Spacewatch | MAS | 560 m | MPC · JPL |
| 579436 | 2014 SP_{52} | — | August 23, 2014 | Haleakala | Pan-STARRS 1 | · | 710 m | MPC · JPL |
| 579437 | 2014 SY_{62} | — | October 24, 2011 | Haleakala | Pan-STARRS 1 | · | 690 m | MPC · JPL |
| 579438 | 2014 SQ_{64} | — | December 20, 2004 | Mount Lemmon | Mount Lemmon Survey | · | 1.3 km | MPC · JPL |
| 579439 | 2014 SU_{74} | — | December 21, 2008 | Kitt Peak | Spacewatch | V | 600 m | MPC · JPL |
| 579440 | 2014 SG_{75} | — | October 18, 2007 | Kitt Peak | Spacewatch | · | 1.2 km | MPC · JPL |
| 579441 | 2014 SK_{78} | — | July 29, 2014 | Haleakala | Pan-STARRS 1 | · | 2.3 km | MPC · JPL |
| 579442 | 2014 SU_{87} | — | September 18, 2014 | Haleakala | Pan-STARRS 1 | · | 860 m | MPC · JPL |
| 579443 | 2014 SA_{105} | — | October 8, 2007 | Mount Lemmon | Mount Lemmon Survey | · | 840 m | MPC · JPL |
| 579444 | 2014 SB_{106} | — | March 8, 2013 | Haleakala | Pan-STARRS 1 | · | 830 m | MPC · JPL |
| 579445 | 2014 SV_{119} | — | January 1, 2008 | Kitt Peak | Spacewatch | MAS | 500 m | MPC · JPL |
| 579446 | 2014 SD_{122} | — | November 18, 2008 | Kitt Peak | Spacewatch | · | 560 m | MPC · JPL |
| 579447 | 2014 SQ_{125} | — | October 2, 2003 | Kitt Peak | Spacewatch | · | 950 m | MPC · JPL |
| 579448 | 2014 SD_{127} | — | April 1, 2009 | Mount Lemmon | Mount Lemmon Survey | · | 910 m | MPC · JPL |
| 579449 | 2014 SH_{127} | — | February 2, 2009 | Kitt Peak | Spacewatch | · | 1.0 km | MPC · JPL |
| 579450 | 2014 SA_{134} | — | October 10, 2007 | Mount Lemmon | Mount Lemmon Survey | NYS | 790 m | MPC · JPL |
| 579451 | 2014 SS_{136} | — | March 18, 2009 | Kitt Peak | Spacewatch | CLA | 1.3 km | MPC · JPL |
| 579452 | 2014 SO_{140} | — | September 18, 2006 | Catalina | CSS | 3:2 · SHU | 5.5 km | MPC · JPL |
| 579453 | 2014 SY_{153} | — | September 19, 2014 | Haleakala | Pan-STARRS 1 | · | 970 m | MPC · JPL |
| 579454 | 2014 SG_{160} | — | February 4, 2012 | Haleakala | Pan-STARRS 1 | · | 1.1 km | MPC · JPL |
| 579455 | 2014 SX_{180} | — | September 28, 2006 | Kitt Peak | Spacewatch | · | 760 m | MPC · JPL |
| 579456 | 2014 SN_{184} | — | February 28, 2012 | Haleakala | Pan-STARRS 1 | · | 1.9 km | MPC · JPL |
| 579457 | 2014 SY_{193} | — | September 20, 2014 | Haleakala | Pan-STARRS 1 | · | 900 m | MPC · JPL |
| 579458 | 2014 SV_{195} | — | August 27, 2014 | Haleakala | Pan-STARRS 1 | · | 1.8 km | MPC · JPL |
| 579459 | 2014 SG_{197} | — | May 13, 2009 | Kitt Peak | Spacewatch | · | 1.2 km | MPC · JPL |
| 579460 | 2014 SC_{204} | — | September 20, 2014 | Haleakala | Pan-STARRS 1 | V | 580 m | MPC · JPL |
| 579461 | 2014 SM_{206} | — | September 11, 2010 | Kitt Peak | Spacewatch | · | 930 m | MPC · JPL |
| 579462 | 2014 SU_{209} | — | December 17, 2001 | Socorro | LINEAR | · | 1.4 km | MPC · JPL |
| 579463 | 2014 SX_{209} | — | August 31, 2014 | Haleakala | Pan-STARRS 1 | · | 1.0 km | MPC · JPL |
| 579464 | 2014 SQ_{210} | — | March 3, 2009 | Kitt Peak | Spacewatch | · | 1.4 km | MPC · JPL |
| 579465 | 2014 SP_{213} | — | September 23, 2008 | Mount Lemmon | Mount Lemmon Survey | EOS | 1.8 km | MPC · JPL |
| 579466 | 2014 SS_{214} | — | October 20, 2003 | Socorro | LINEAR | · | 1.0 km | MPC · JPL |
| 579467 | 2014 ST_{215} | — | March 15, 2004 | Kitt Peak | Spacewatch | · | 1.2 km | MPC · JPL |
| 579468 | 2014 SB_{218} | — | July 24, 2003 | Palomar | NEAT | · | 1.1 km | MPC · JPL |
| 579469 | 2014 SZ_{221} | — | October 12, 2010 | Kitt Peak | Spacewatch | · | 1.3 km | MPC · JPL |
| 579470 | 2014 SH_{226} | — | January 25, 2009 | Kitt Peak | Spacewatch | MAS | 610 m | MPC · JPL |
| 579471 | 2014 SO_{227} | — | January 31, 2009 | Kitt Peak | Spacewatch | · | 730 m | MPC · JPL |
| 579472 | 2014 SJ_{228} | — | September 19, 2014 | Haleakala | Pan-STARRS 1 | V | 560 m | MPC · JPL |
| 579473 | 2014 SQ_{228} | — | August 23, 2003 | Palomar | NEAT | V | 580 m | MPC · JPL |
| 579474 | 2014 SH_{230} | — | August 29, 2006 | Kitt Peak | Spacewatch | PHO | 960 m | MPC · JPL |
| 579475 | 2014 SB_{231} | — | September 19, 2014 | Haleakala | Pan-STARRS 1 | · | 890 m | MPC · JPL |
| 579476 | 2014 ST_{231} | — | September 21, 2003 | Haleakala | NEAT | · | 810 m | MPC · JPL |
| 579477 | 2014 SP_{233} | — | July 18, 2002 | Palomar | NEAT | · | 1.5 km | MPC · JPL |
| 579478 | 2014 SJ_{234} | — | September 28, 2006 | Kitt Peak | Spacewatch | 3:2 · SHU | 4.2 km | MPC · JPL |
| 579479 | 2014 SG_{238} | — | November 3, 2011 | Mount Lemmon | Mount Lemmon Survey | · | 670 m | MPC · JPL |
| 579480 | 2014 SX_{238} | — | October 25, 2009 | Kitt Peak | Spacewatch | LIX | 2.1 km | MPC · JPL |
| 579481 | 2014 SF_{239} | — | October 24, 2011 | Haleakala | Pan-STARRS 1 | · | 620 m | MPC · JPL |
| 579482 | 2014 SP_{239} | — | September 25, 2009 | Kitt Peak | Spacewatch | · | 1.4 km | MPC · JPL |
| 579483 | 2014 SU_{239} | — | October 17, 2007 | Mount Lemmon | Mount Lemmon Survey | PHO | 850 m | MPC · JPL |
| 579484 | 2014 SV_{243} | — | April 19, 2012 | Kitt Peak | Spacewatch | · | 3.1 km | MPC · JPL |
| 579485 | 2014 SM_{248} | — | September 12, 2007 | Catalina | CSS | · | 790 m | MPC · JPL |
| 579486 | 2014 SC_{249} | — | March 16, 2013 | Kitt Peak | Spacewatch | · | 1.1 km | MPC · JPL |
| 579487 | 2014 SR_{251} | — | September 2, 2014 | Haleakala | Pan-STARRS 1 | · | 1.3 km | MPC · JPL |
| 579488 | 2014 SQ_{253} | — | October 13, 2010 | Mount Lemmon | Mount Lemmon Survey | · | 1.0 km | MPC · JPL |
| 579489 | 2014 SF_{263} | — | October 29, 2003 | Kitt Peak | Spacewatch | · | 1.2 km | MPC · JPL |
| 579490 | 2014 SU_{268} | — | May 3, 2006 | Mount Lemmon | Mount Lemmon Survey | · | 990 m | MPC · JPL |
| 579491 | 2014 SO_{278} | — | November 2, 2007 | Kitt Peak | Spacewatch | · | 780 m | MPC · JPL |
| 579492 | 2014 SB_{290} | — | November 26, 2011 | Mount Lemmon | Mount Lemmon Survey | · | 990 m | MPC · JPL |
| 579493 | 2014 SO_{298} | — | December 19, 2007 | Mount Lemmon | Mount Lemmon Survey | · | 1.2 km | MPC · JPL |
| 579494 | 2014 SM_{299} | — | October 16, 2001 | Kitt Peak | Spacewatch | JUN | 1 km | MPC · JPL |
| 579495 | 2014 SA_{306} | — | August 25, 2003 | Cerro Tololo | Deep Ecliptic Survey | · | 830 m | MPC · JPL |
| 579496 | 2014 SB_{306} | — | September 19, 2014 | Haleakala | Pan-STARRS 1 | · | 900 m | MPC · JPL |
| 579497 | 2014 SP_{308} | — | September 18, 2003 | Palomar | NEAT | · | 930 m | MPC · JPL |
| 579498 | 2014 SE_{309} | — | August 29, 2014 | Mount Lemmon | Mount Lemmon Survey | · | 1.3 km | MPC · JPL |
| 579499 | 2014 SJ_{309} | — | March 31, 2009 | Kitt Peak | Spacewatch | L5 | 8.0 km | MPC · JPL |
| 579500 | 2014 SM_{310} | — | August 31, 2010 | ESA OGS | ESA OGS | NYS | 1.0 km | MPC · JPL |

== 579501–579600 ==
back to top

| Designation | | | Discovery | | | Properties | | Ref |
| Permanent | Provisional | Named after | Date | Site | Discoverer(s) | Category | Diam. | Ref |
|---|---|---|---|---|---|---|---|---|
| 579501 | 2014 SZ_{312} | — | October 20, 2003 | Kitt Peak | Spacewatch | V | 500 m | MPC · JPL |
| 579502 | 2014 SQ_{313} | — | February 3, 2008 | Mount Lemmon | Mount Lemmon Survey | · | 910 m | MPC · JPL |
| 579503 | 2014 SM_{314} | — | September 19, 2014 | Haleakala | Pan-STARRS 1 | · | 990 m | MPC · JPL |
| 579504 | 2014 SW_{315} | — | November 4, 2004 | Kitt Peak | Spacewatch | · | 500 m | MPC · JPL |
| 579505 | 2014 SK_{316} | — | July 7, 2010 | Kitt Peak | Spacewatch | · | 830 m | MPC · JPL |
| 579506 | 2014 SS_{322} | — | August 20, 2014 | Haleakala | Pan-STARRS 1 | · | 2.9 km | MPC · JPL |
| 579507 | 2014 SC_{327} | — | November 21, 2007 | Mount Lemmon | Mount Lemmon Survey | · | 830 m | MPC · JPL |
| 579508 | 2014 SH_{329} | — | October 16, 2007 | Mount Lemmon | Mount Lemmon Survey | · | 880 m | MPC · JPL |
| 579509 | 2014 SN_{329} | — | February 27, 2012 | Catalina | CSS | RAF | 1.0 km | MPC · JPL |
| 579510 | 2014 SU_{329} | — | September 29, 2014 | Kitt Peak | Spacewatch | · | 2.3 km | MPC · JPL |
| 579511 | 2014 SF_{331} | — | March 15, 2013 | Mount Lemmon | Mount Lemmon Survey | · | 1.1 km | MPC · JPL |
| 579512 | 2014 SE_{348} | — | November 20, 2003 | Kitt Peak | Spacewatch | · | 940 m | MPC · JPL |
| 579513 | 2014 SE_{357} | — | September 18, 2014 | Haleakala | Pan-STARRS 1 | (5) | 820 m | MPC · JPL |
| 579514 | 2014 SY_{357} | — | March 3, 2009 | Kitt Peak | Spacewatch | · | 990 m | MPC · JPL |
| 579515 | 2014 SN_{359} | — | December 31, 2011 | Kitt Peak | Spacewatch | · | 850 m | MPC · JPL |
| 579516 | 2014 SE_{362} | — | September 24, 2014 | Mount Lemmon | Mount Lemmon Survey | ADE | 1.7 km | MPC · JPL |
| 579517 | 2014 SJ_{363} | — | September 30, 2014 | Kitt Peak | Spacewatch | · | 1.5 km | MPC · JPL |
| 579518 | 2014 SA_{367} | — | September 24, 2014 | ESA OGS | ESA OGS | · | 960 m | MPC · JPL |
| 579519 | 2014 SC_{368} | — | September 9, 2007 | Kitt Peak | Spacewatch | · | 460 m | MPC · JPL |
| 579520 | 2014 SX_{393} | — | September 20, 2014 | Haleakala | Pan-STARRS 1 | HYG | 2.2 km | MPC · JPL |
| 579521 | 2014 TA_{2} | — | October 30, 2010 | Mount Lemmon | Mount Lemmon Survey | MAR | 730 m | MPC · JPL |
| 579522 | 2014 TH_{3} | — | October 2, 2003 | Kitt Peak | Spacewatch | MAS | 600 m | MPC · JPL |
| 579523 | 2014 TU_{3} | — | September 14, 2007 | Mount Lemmon | Mount Lemmon Survey | · | 740 m | MPC · JPL |
| 579524 | 2014 TY_{4} | — | September 23, 2014 | Kitt Peak | Spacewatch | · | 1.0 km | MPC · JPL |
| 579525 | 2014 TF_{5} | — | September 23, 2014 | Mount Lemmon | Mount Lemmon Survey | JUN | 780 m | MPC · JPL |
| 579526 | 2014 TO_{7} | — | October 31, 2006 | Mount Lemmon | Mount Lemmon Survey | 3:2 | 3.9 km | MPC · JPL |
| 579527 | 2014 TO_{9} | — | October 1, 2014 | Mount Lemmon | Mount Lemmon Survey | V | 530 m | MPC · JPL |
| 579528 | 2014 TZ_{9} | — | May 17, 2009 | Mount Lemmon | Mount Lemmon Survey | V | 620 m | MPC · JPL |
| 579529 | 2014 TG_{11} | — | September 19, 2014 | Haleakala | Pan-STARRS 1 | · | 1.0 km | MPC · JPL |
| 579530 | 2014 TC_{12} | — | October 16, 1999 | Apache Point | SDSS | · | 860 m | MPC · JPL |
| 579531 | 2014 TJ_{13} | — | November 2, 2010 | Mount Lemmon | Mount Lemmon Survey | · | 800 m | MPC · JPL |
| 579532 | 2014 TM_{18} | — | February 10, 2008 | Kitt Peak | Spacewatch | · | 1.1 km | MPC · JPL |
| 579533 | 2014 TH_{22} | — | September 2, 2014 | Haleakala | Pan-STARRS 1 | · | 1.0 km | MPC · JPL |
| 579534 | 2014 TY_{22} | — | December 4, 2010 | Piszkés-tető | K. Sárneczky, S. Kürti | · | 1.5 km | MPC · JPL |
| 579535 | 2014 TD_{24} | — | January 2, 2012 | Mount Lemmon | Mount Lemmon Survey | · | 780 m | MPC · JPL |
| 579536 | 2014 TD_{25} | — | March 13, 2013 | Kitt Peak | Spacewatch | V | 600 m | MPC · JPL |
| 579537 | 2014 TD_{30} | — | March 6, 2008 | Mount Lemmon | Mount Lemmon Survey | · | 1.1 km | MPC · JPL |
| 579538 | 2014 TL_{43} | — | July 29, 2006 | Reedy Creek | J. Broughton | · | 1.3 km | MPC · JPL |
| 579539 | 2014 TQ_{43} | — | October 20, 2003 | Kitt Peak | Spacewatch | · | 1.2 km | MPC · JPL |
| 579540 | 2014 TM_{46} | — | February 28, 2012 | Haleakala | Pan-STARRS 1 | NYS | 960 m | MPC · JPL |
| 579541 | 2014 TG_{47} | — | October 13, 2014 | Mount Lemmon | Mount Lemmon Survey | · | 610 m | MPC · JPL |
| 579542 | 2014 TW_{48} | — | October 3, 2014 | Kitt Peak | Spacewatch | · | 1.2 km | MPC · JPL |
| 579543 | 2014 TE_{51} | — | October 14, 2014 | Mount Lemmon | Mount Lemmon Survey | · | 920 m | MPC · JPL |
| 579544 | 2014 TE_{53} | — | February 19, 2012 | Kitt Peak | Spacewatch | · | 1.1 km | MPC · JPL |
| 579545 | 2014 TR_{54} | — | October 14, 2014 | Kitt Peak | Spacewatch | · | 1.0 km | MPC · JPL |
| 579546 | 2014 TE_{59} | — | September 25, 2003 | Palomar | NEAT | · | 910 m | MPC · JPL |
| 579547 | 2014 TW_{65} | — | April 27, 2012 | Haleakala | Pan-STARRS 1 | · | 1.2 km | MPC · JPL |
| 579548 | 2014 TA_{71} | — | November 18, 2007 | Mount Lemmon | Mount Lemmon Survey | NYS | 840 m | MPC · JPL |
| 579549 | 2014 TU_{75} | — | October 29, 1999 | Kitt Peak | Spacewatch | · | 990 m | MPC · JPL |
| 579550 | 2014 TY_{78} | — | September 19, 2014 | Haleakala | Pan-STARRS 1 | · | 1.5 km | MPC · JPL |
| 579551 | 2014 TG_{79} | — | November 20, 2003 | Kitt Peak | Spacewatch | V | 530 m | MPC · JPL |
| 579552 | 2014 TL_{80} | — | October 1, 2014 | Haleakala | Pan-STARRS 1 | PHO | 840 m | MPC · JPL |
| 579553 | 2014 TS_{80} | — | October 11, 2007 | Kitt Peak | Spacewatch | · | 740 m | MPC · JPL |
| 579554 | 2014 TL_{87} | — | October 3, 2014 | Haleakala | Pan-STARRS 1 | · | 1.1 km | MPC · JPL |
| 579555 | 2014 TN_{89} | — | October 2, 2014 | Haleakala | Pan-STARRS 1 | · | 1.2 km | MPC · JPL |
| 579556 | 2014 TS_{89} | — | October 3, 2014 | Mount Lemmon | Mount Lemmon Survey | · | 640 m | MPC · JPL |
| 579557 | 2014 TW_{91} | — | October 1, 2014 | Haleakala | Pan-STARRS 1 | V | 460 m | MPC · JPL |
| 579558 | 2014 TW_{92} | — | March 23, 2012 | Mount Lemmon | Mount Lemmon Survey | · | 940 m | MPC · JPL |
| 579559 | 2014 TR_{94} | — | October 5, 2014 | Mount Lemmon | Mount Lemmon Survey | MAR | 700 m | MPC · JPL |
| 579560 | 2014 TD_{96} | — | October 3, 2014 | Mount Lemmon | Mount Lemmon Survey | L5 | 9.9 km | MPC · JPL |
| 579561 | 2014 TW_{102} | — | October 4, 2014 | Haleakala | Pan-STARRS 1 | · | 1.8 km | MPC · JPL |
| 579562 | 2014 TT_{103} | — | October 5, 2014 | Mount Lemmon | Mount Lemmon Survey | L5 | 6.5 km | MPC · JPL |
| 579563 | 2014 TD_{104} | — | October 1, 2014 | Haleakala | Pan-STARRS 1 | · | 1.1 km | MPC · JPL |
| 579564 | 2014 UN_{2} | — | August 29, 2014 | Mount Lemmon | Mount Lemmon Survey | · | 1.5 km | MPC · JPL |
| 579565 | 2014 UT_{2} | — | January 1, 2008 | Kitt Peak | Spacewatch | · | 980 m | MPC · JPL |
| 579566 | 2014 UF_{3} | — | October 1, 2014 | Haleakala | Pan-STARRS 1 | JUN | 920 m | MPC · JPL |
| 579567 | 2014 UF_{11} | — | February 23, 2012 | Mount Lemmon | Mount Lemmon Survey | V | 500 m | MPC · JPL |
| 579568 | 2014 UL_{12} | — | February 13, 2005 | La Silla | A. Boattini | · | 1.4 km | MPC · JPL |
| 579569 | 2014 US_{16} | — | October 17, 2014 | Mount Lemmon | Mount Lemmon Survey | · | 1.4 km | MPC · JPL |
| 579570 | 2014 UU_{22} | — | November 15, 2003 | Kitt Peak | Spacewatch | MAS | 760 m | MPC · JPL |
| 579571 | 2014 UF_{31} | — | September 2, 2014 | Haleakala | Pan-STARRS 1 | · | 1.3 km | MPC · JPL |
| 579572 | 2014 UY_{32} | — | September 17, 2010 | Mount Lemmon | Mount Lemmon Survey | MAS | 700 m | MPC · JPL |
| 579573 | 2014 UG_{33} | — | December 6, 2007 | Catalina | CSS | · | 920 m | MPC · JPL |
| 579574 | 2014 UL_{36} | — | November 12, 2010 | Mount Lemmon | Mount Lemmon Survey | · | 1.1 km | MPC · JPL |
| 579575 | 2014 UV_{37} | — | November 18, 2007 | Mount Lemmon | Mount Lemmon Survey | NYS | 910 m | MPC · JPL |
| 579576 | 2014 UO_{38} | — | May 17, 2009 | Mount Lemmon | Mount Lemmon Survey | · | 1.1 km | MPC · JPL |
| 579577 | 2014 UL_{51} | — | September 5, 1996 | Lime Creek | R. Linderholm | · | 1.4 km | MPC · JPL |
| 579578 | 2014 US_{52} | — | October 22, 2014 | Mount Lemmon | Mount Lemmon Survey | · | 590 m | MPC · JPL |
| 579579 | 2014 UU_{54} | — | October 23, 2014 | Kitt Peak | Spacewatch | · | 730 m | MPC · JPL |
| 579580 | 2014 UO_{58} | — | December 29, 2011 | Kitt Peak | Spacewatch | NYS | 1.2 km | MPC · JPL |
| 579581 | 2014 UP_{62} | — | October 10, 2007 | Mount Lemmon | Mount Lemmon Survey | · | 980 m | MPC · JPL |
| 579582 | 2014 UY_{77} | — | March 19, 2009 | Mount Lemmon | Mount Lemmon Survey | NYS | 1.2 km | MPC · JPL |
| 579583 | 2014 UM_{80} | — | September 15, 2006 | Kitt Peak | Spacewatch | 3:2 | 3.9 km | MPC · JPL |
| 579584 | 2014 US_{82} | — | September 25, 2014 | Kitt Peak | Spacewatch | · | 1.2 km | MPC · JPL |
| 579585 | 2014 UT_{85} | — | October 21, 2014 | Mount Lemmon | Mount Lemmon Survey | · | 1.2 km | MPC · JPL |
| 579586 | 2014 UU_{85} | — | October 25, 2001 | Apache Point | SDSS Collaboration | · | 1.4 km | MPC · JPL |
| 579587 | 2014 UF_{88} | — | January 11, 2008 | Kitt Peak | Spacewatch | MAS | 720 m | MPC · JPL |
| 579588 | 2014 UN_{88} | — | September 6, 2013 | Kitt Peak | Spacewatch | L5 | 8.2 km | MPC · JPL |
| 579589 | 2014 UQ_{97} | — | October 23, 2014 | Kitt Peak | Spacewatch | · | 2.6 km | MPC · JPL |
| 579590 | 2014 UV_{97} | — | August 31, 2014 | Haleakala | Pan-STARRS 1 | · | 940 m | MPC · JPL |
| 579591 | 2014 UO_{98} | — | October 15, 2014 | Kitt Peak | Spacewatch | L5 | 8.7 km | MPC · JPL |
| 579592 | 2014 US_{99} | — | August 22, 2003 | Palomar | NEAT | MAS | 620 m | MPC · JPL |
| 579593 | 2014 UL_{103} | — | February 11, 2008 | Mount Lemmon | Mount Lemmon Survey | · | 1.2 km | MPC · JPL |
| 579594 | 2014 UU_{103} | — | May 13, 2012 | Mount Lemmon | Mount Lemmon Survey | T_{j} (2.98) · 3:2 | 5.4 km | MPC · JPL |
| 579595 | 2014 UN_{109} | — | February 27, 2012 | Haleakala | Pan-STARRS 1 | EOS | 1.6 km | MPC · JPL |
| 579596 | 2014 UF_{119} | — | January 25, 2009 | Kitt Peak | Spacewatch | · | 710 m | MPC · JPL |
| 579597 | 2014 UV_{123} | — | February 9, 2008 | Kitt Peak | Spacewatch | · | 1 km | MPC · JPL |
| 579598 | 2014 UU_{127} | — | November 28, 2005 | Kitt Peak | Spacewatch | · | 1.4 km | MPC · JPL |
| 579599 | 2014 UD_{130} | — | September 11, 2010 | Catalina | CSS | · | 1.0 km | MPC · JPL |
| 579600 | 2014 UF_{132} | — | July 15, 2005 | Kitt Peak | Spacewatch | T_{j} (2.99) · 3:2 · (6124) | 3.8 km | MPC · JPL |

== 579601–579700 ==
back to top

| Designation | | | Discovery | | | Properties | | Ref |
| Permanent | Provisional | Named after | Date | Site | Discoverer(s) | Category | Diam. | Ref |
|---|---|---|---|---|---|---|---|---|
| 579601 | 2014 UJ_{150} | — | September 26, 2014 | Kitt Peak | Spacewatch | · | 810 m | MPC · JPL |
| 579602 | 2014 UU_{151} | — | May 10, 2005 | Mount Lemmon | Mount Lemmon Survey | · | 1.3 km | MPC · JPL |
| 579603 | 2014 UR_{158} | — | April 3, 2008 | Kitt Peak | Spacewatch | · | 1.4 km | MPC · JPL |
| 579604 | 2014 UD_{159} | — | October 21, 2003 | Kitt Peak | Spacewatch | · | 1.2 km | MPC · JPL |
| 579605 | 2014 UA_{161} | — | October 25, 2014 | Haleakala | Pan-STARRS 1 | · | 1 km | MPC · JPL |
| 579606 | 2014 UQ_{163} | — | October 25, 2014 | Haleakala | Pan-STARRS 1 | · | 1.3 km | MPC · JPL |
| 579607 | 2014 UF_{165} | — | March 26, 2008 | Mount Lemmon | Mount Lemmon Survey | · | 1.2 km | MPC · JPL |
| 579608 | 2014 UX_{168} | — | March 29, 2008 | Kitt Peak | Spacewatch | L5 | 7.7 km | MPC · JPL |
| 579609 | 2014 UL_{169} | — | August 29, 2006 | Kitt Peak | Spacewatch | V | 500 m | MPC · JPL |
| 579610 | 2014 UN_{169} | — | December 14, 2010 | Mount Lemmon | Mount Lemmon Survey | ADE | 1.4 km | MPC · JPL |
| 579611 | 2014 UE_{170} | — | March 11, 2008 | Mount Lemmon | Mount Lemmon Survey | · | 960 m | MPC · JPL |
| 579612 | 2014 UA_{172} | — | September 28, 2003 | Anderson Mesa | LONEOS | · | 1 km | MPC · JPL |
| 579613 | 2014 UK_{173} | — | October 28, 2014 | Mount Lemmon | Mount Lemmon Survey | · | 1.1 km | MPC · JPL |
| 579614 | 2014 UC_{174} | — | April 17, 2005 | Kitt Peak | Spacewatch | · | 1.2 km | MPC · JPL |
| 579615 | 2014 UM_{174} | — | April 4, 2008 | Kitt Peak | Spacewatch | MAR | 780 m | MPC · JPL |
| 579616 | 2014 UZ_{180} | — | October 11, 2007 | Kitt Peak | Spacewatch | NYS | 910 m | MPC · JPL |
| 579617 | 2014 UN_{183} | — | October 3, 2006 | Mount Lemmon | Mount Lemmon Survey | T_{j} (2.95) · 3:2 | 4.9 km | MPC · JPL |
| 579618 | 2014 UE_{184} | — | December 6, 2007 | Charleston | R. Holmes | · | 1.0 km | MPC · JPL |
| 579619 | 2014 UL_{184} | — | September 28, 2006 | Kitt Peak | Spacewatch | 3:2 | 5.0 km | MPC · JPL |
| 579620 | 2014 UJ_{194} | — | August 25, 2014 | Haleakala | Pan-STARRS 1 | · | 970 m | MPC · JPL |
| 579621 | 2014 UW_{194} | — | January 17, 2008 | Mount Lemmon | Mount Lemmon Survey | V | 690 m | MPC · JPL |
| 579622 | 2014 US_{197} | — | May 8, 2013 | Haleakala | Pan-STARRS 1 | V | 620 m | MPC · JPL |
| 579623 | 2014 UO_{199} | — | October 3, 2010 | Piszkés-tető | K. Sárneczky, Z. Kuli | · | 1.1 km | MPC · JPL |
| 579624 | 2014 UR_{199} | — | November 30, 2000 | Kitt Peak | Spacewatch | · | 1.3 km | MPC · JPL |
| 579625 | 2014 UU_{202} | — | September 27, 2003 | Kitt Peak | Spacewatch | MAS | 710 m | MPC · JPL |
| 579626 | 2014 UV_{204} | — | October 3, 2014 | Mount Lemmon | Mount Lemmon Survey | · | 710 m | MPC · JPL |
| 579627 | 2014 UF_{205} | — | October 16, 2006 | Kitt Peak | Spacewatch | · | 760 m | MPC · JPL |
| 579628 | 2014 UZ_{205} | — | January 18, 2004 | Palomar | NEAT | · | 1.3 km | MPC · JPL |
| 579629 | 2014 UE_{206} | — | May 26, 2006 | Mount Lemmon | Mount Lemmon Survey | · | 1.7 km | MPC · JPL |
| 579630 | 2014 UQ_{211} | — | August 28, 2014 | Haleakala | Pan-STARRS 1 | V | 610 m | MPC · JPL |
| 579631 | 2014 UL_{214} | — | June 12, 2013 | Oukaïmeden | M. Ory | T_{j} (2.96) · 3:2 | 4.8 km | MPC · JPL |
| 579632 | 2014 UZ_{219} | — | October 30, 2010 | Kitt Peak | Spacewatch | · | 1.2 km | MPC · JPL |
| 579633 | 2014 UJ_{223} | — | September 30, 2003 | Kitt Peak | Spacewatch | · | 1.2 km | MPC · JPL |
| 579634 | 2014 UZ_{227} | — | October 22, 2014 | Mount Lemmon | Mount Lemmon Survey | · | 610 m | MPC · JPL |
| 579635 | 2014 UX_{231} | — | October 26, 2014 | Mount Lemmon | Mount Lemmon Survey | · | 1.5 km | MPC · JPL |
| 579636 | 2014 UW_{234} | — | October 12, 2010 | Kitt Peak | Spacewatch | · | 1.1 km | MPC · JPL |
| 579637 | 2014 UF_{235} | — | December 14, 2010 | Mount Lemmon | Mount Lemmon Survey | (5) | 1.1 km | MPC · JPL |
| 579638 | 2014 UU_{236} | — | October 26, 2014 | Mount Lemmon | Mount Lemmon Survey | · | 1.2 km | MPC · JPL |
| 579639 | 2014 US_{237} | — | October 28, 2014 | Haleakala | Pan-STARRS 1 | · | 1.1 km | MPC · JPL |
| 579640 | 2014 UR_{243} | — | October 29, 2014 | Haleakala | Pan-STARRS 1 | LIX | 2.4 km | MPC · JPL |
| 579641 | 2014 UW_{245} | — | October 23, 2014 | Nogales | M. Schwartz, P. R. Holvorcem | · | 2.3 km | MPC · JPL |
| 579642 | 2014 UW_{253} | — | January 8, 2016 | Haleakala | Pan-STARRS 1 | MAR | 860 m | MPC · JPL |
| 579643 | 2014 US_{255} | — | October 17, 2014 | Kitt Peak | Spacewatch | L5 | 8.9 km | MPC · JPL |
| 579644 | 2014 UB_{258} | — | August 14, 2012 | Haleakala | Pan-STARRS 1 | L5 | 7.2 km | MPC · JPL |
| 579645 | 2014 UC_{258} | — | October 31, 2014 | Mount Lemmon | Mount Lemmon Survey | L5 | 6.6 km | MPC · JPL |
| 579646 | 2014 UK_{270} | — | October 28, 2014 | Kitt Peak | Spacewatch | L5 | 7.4 km | MPC · JPL |
| 579647 | 2014 VC_{5} | — | November 28, 2003 | Kitt Peak | Spacewatch | · | 930 m | MPC · JPL |
| 579648 | 2014 VM_{7} | — | October 21, 2014 | Mount Lemmon | Mount Lemmon Survey | NYS | 870 m | MPC · JPL |
| 579649 | 2014 VF_{8} | — | October 3, 2014 | Mount Lemmon | Mount Lemmon Survey | L5 | 10 km | MPC · JPL |
| 579650 | 2014 VH_{8} | — | May 6, 2011 | Mount Lemmon | Mount Lemmon Survey | L5 | 10 km | MPC · JPL |
| 579651 | 2014 VO_{8} | — | November 12, 2014 | Haleakala | Pan-STARRS 1 | · | 1.3 km | MPC · JPL |
| 579652 | 2014 VT_{10} | — | October 29, 2010 | Mount Lemmon | Mount Lemmon Survey | · | 1.2 km | MPC · JPL |
| 579653 | 2014 VL_{22} | — | October 18, 2014 | Mount Lemmon | Mount Lemmon Survey | · | 1.1 km | MPC · JPL |
| 579654 | 2014 VY_{22} | — | October 3, 2014 | Mount Lemmon | Mount Lemmon Survey | · | 1.2 km | MPC · JPL |
| 579655 | 2014 VT_{27} | — | October 6, 2010 | Bisei | BATTeRS | · | 1.0 km | MPC · JPL |
| 579656 | 2014 VN_{30} | — | November 8, 2009 | Mount Lemmon | Mount Lemmon Survey | 615 | 1.2 km | MPC · JPL |
| 579657 | 2014 VW_{30} | — | October 31, 2014 | Kitt Peak | Spacewatch | · | 1.0 km | MPC · JPL |
| 579658 | 2014 VJ_{35} | — | September 15, 2013 | Haleakala | Pan-STARRS 1 | L5 | 8.5 km | MPC · JPL |
| 579659 | 2014 VU_{35} | — | February 20, 2002 | Kitt Peak | Spacewatch | KOR | 1.1 km | MPC · JPL |
| 579660 | 2014 VZ_{37} | — | September 2, 2014 | La Palma | La Palma | L5 | 8.6 km | MPC · JPL |
| 579661 | 2014 VH_{38} | — | February 26, 2011 | Catalina | CSS | · | 1.5 km | MPC · JPL |
| 579662 | 2014 VA_{40} | — | November 15, 2014 | Mount Lemmon | Mount Lemmon Survey | (1547) | 1.3 km | MPC · JPL |
| 579663 | 2014 VB_{40} | — | November 9, 2014 | Haleakala | Pan-STARRS 1 | · | 1.3 km | MPC · JPL |
| 579664 | 2014 WD | — | November 16, 2014 | Mount Lemmon | Mount Lemmon Survey | L5 | 6.9 km | MPC · JPL |
| 579665 | 2014 WP | — | August 31, 2003 | Haleakala | NEAT | NYS | 910 m | MPC · JPL |
| 579666 | 2014 WN_{1} | — | September 27, 2003 | Kitt Peak | Spacewatch | · | 880 m | MPC · JPL |
| 579667 | 2014 WS_{1} | — | October 14, 2001 | Apache Point | SDSS Collaboration | · | 1.1 km | MPC · JPL |
| 579668 | 2014 WU_{1} | — | October 25, 2014 | Haleakala | Pan-STARRS 1 | · | 2.6 km | MPC · JPL |
| 579669 | 2014 WS_{6} | — | September 10, 2001 | Socorro | LINEAR | H | 600 m | MPC · JPL |
| 579670 | 2014 WA_{11} | — | November 14, 2010 | Kitt Peak | Spacewatch | · | 850 m | MPC · JPL |
| 579671 | 2014 WV_{18} | — | November 16, 2014 | Mount Lemmon | Mount Lemmon Survey | · | 940 m | MPC · JPL |
| 579672 | 2014 WY_{24} | — | October 21, 2014 | Mount Lemmon | Mount Lemmon Survey | · | 1.2 km | MPC · JPL |
| 579673 | 2014 WD_{26} | — | May 9, 2013 | Haleakala | Pan-STARRS 1 | · | 1.2 km | MPC · JPL |
| 579674 | 2014 WE_{31} | — | October 31, 2006 | Kitt Peak | Spacewatch | · | 1.1 km | MPC · JPL |
| 579675 | 2014 WA_{32} | — | September 29, 2008 | Mount Lemmon | Mount Lemmon Survey | · | 2.7 km | MPC · JPL |
| 579676 | 2014 WK_{35} | — | September 15, 2010 | Mount Lemmon | Mount Lemmon Survey | · | 950 m | MPC · JPL |
| 579677 | 2014 WD_{37} | — | May 4, 2009 | Siding Spring | SSS | · | 1.4 km | MPC · JPL |
| 579678 | 2014 WP_{43} | — | October 26, 2014 | Mount Lemmon | Mount Lemmon Survey | · | 1.3 km | MPC · JPL |
| 579679 | 2014 WG_{55} | — | October 11, 2006 | Kitt Peak | Spacewatch | · | 1 km | MPC · JPL |
| 579680 | 2014 WM_{57} | — | October 26, 2014 | Haleakala | Pan-STARRS 1 | · | 1.3 km | MPC · JPL |
| 579681 | 2014 WG_{59} | — | December 4, 2007 | Mount Lemmon | Mount Lemmon Survey | V | 500 m | MPC · JPL |
| 579682 | 2014 WH_{62} | — | August 22, 2003 | Palomar | NEAT | · | 860 m | MPC · JPL |
| 579683 | 2014 WG_{68} | — | November 4, 2007 | Kitt Peak | Spacewatch | V | 650 m | MPC · JPL |
| 579684 | 2014 WL_{68} | — | December 30, 2007 | Mount Lemmon | Mount Lemmon Survey | · | 810 m | MPC · JPL |
| 579685 | 2014 WS_{68} | — | September 3, 2010 | Mount Lemmon | Mount Lemmon Survey | NYS | 730 m | MPC · JPL |
| 579686 | 2014 WD_{69} | — | November 9, 2007 | Mount Lemmon | Mount Lemmon Survey | · | 930 m | MPC · JPL |
| 579687 | 2014 WZ_{69} | — | November 20, 2014 | Mount Lemmon | Mount Lemmon Survey | H | 510 m | MPC · JPL |
| 579688 | 2014 WH_{72} | — | February 28, 2008 | Kitt Peak | Spacewatch | · | 1.1 km | MPC · JPL |
| 579689 | 2014 WN_{75} | — | February 20, 2009 | Mount Lemmon | Mount Lemmon Survey | · | 440 m | MPC · JPL |
| 579690 | 2014 WS_{82} | — | August 31, 2014 | Haleakala | Pan-STARRS 1 | NYS | 850 m | MPC · JPL |
| 579691 | 2014 WC_{86} | — | October 2, 2006 | Mount Lemmon | Mount Lemmon Survey | T_{j} (2.99) · 3:2 · SHU | 3.3 km | MPC · JPL |
| 579692 | 2014 WK_{92} | — | September 20, 2014 | Haleakala | Pan-STARRS 1 | · | 990 m | MPC · JPL |
| 579693 | 2014 WH_{94} | — | November 17, 2014 | Mount Lemmon | Mount Lemmon Survey | · | 1.5 km | MPC · JPL |
| 579694 | 2014 WY_{96} | — | August 28, 2009 | Kitt Peak | Spacewatch | · | 1.2 km | MPC · JPL |
| 579695 | 2014 WE_{101} | — | May 8, 2008 | Kitt Peak | Spacewatch | · | 1.1 km | MPC · JPL |
| 579696 | 2014 WC_{102} | — | November 2, 2007 | Mount Lemmon | Mount Lemmon Survey | · | 770 m | MPC · JPL |
| 579697 | 2014 WQ_{104} | — | February 3, 2012 | Haleakala | Pan-STARRS 1 | · | 810 m | MPC · JPL |
| 579698 | 2014 WQ_{109} | — | September 16, 2010 | Kitt Peak | Spacewatch | · | 970 m | MPC · JPL |
| 579699 | 2014 WK_{110} | — | October 22, 2003 | Apache Point | SDSS | · | 910 m | MPC · JPL |
| 579700 | 2014 WB_{111} | — | July 15, 2002 | Palomar | NEAT | · | 1.6 km | MPC · JPL |

== 579701–579800 ==
back to top

| Designation | | | Discovery | | | Properties | | Ref |
| Permanent | Provisional | Named after | Date | Site | Discoverer(s) | Category | Diam. | Ref |
|---|---|---|---|---|---|---|---|---|
| 579701 | 2014 WS_{112} | — | July 1, 2013 | Haleakala | Pan-STARRS 1 | · | 920 m | MPC · JPL |
| 579702 | 2014 WH_{113} | — | September 3, 2005 | Palomar | NEAT | · | 1.8 km | MPC · JPL |
| 579703 | 2014 WM_{115} | — | January 27, 2007 | Mount Lemmon | Mount Lemmon Survey | · | 1.2 km | MPC · JPL |
| 579704 | 2014 WD_{122} | — | September 3, 2000 | Apache Point | SDSS Collaboration | · | 2.0 km | MPC · JPL |
| 579705 | 2014 WG_{129} | — | October 23, 2014 | Kitt Peak | Spacewatch | L5 | 8.2 km | MPC · JPL |
| 579706 | 2014 WC_{132} | — | October 30, 2014 | Charleston | R. Holmes | · | 1.2 km | MPC · JPL |
| 579707 | 2014 WF_{132} | — | November 17, 2014 | Haleakala | Pan-STARRS 1 | V | 510 m | MPC · JPL |
| 579708 | 2014 WH_{133} | — | November 17, 2014 | Haleakala | Pan-STARRS 1 | EUN | 870 m | MPC · JPL |
| 579709 | 2014 WK_{133} | — | November 17, 2014 | Haleakala | Pan-STARRS 1 | · | 1.7 km | MPC · JPL |
| 579710 | 2014 WC_{137} | — | August 30, 2005 | Kitt Peak | Spacewatch | · | 850 m | MPC · JPL |
| 579711 | 2014 WF_{138} | — | November 17, 2014 | Haleakala | Pan-STARRS 1 | · | 1.1 km | MPC · JPL |
| 579712 | 2014 WW_{142} | — | November 17, 2014 | Haleakala | Pan-STARRS 1 | L5 | 6.1 km | MPC · JPL |
| 579713 | 2014 WH_{145} | — | April 3, 2008 | Mount Lemmon | Mount Lemmon Survey | · | 1.1 km | MPC · JPL |
| 579714 | 2014 WU_{145} | — | October 27, 2003 | Kitt Peak | Spacewatch | · | 1.3 km | MPC · JPL |
| 579715 | 2014 WG_{147} | — | September 5, 2010 | Mount Lemmon | Mount Lemmon Survey | · | 1.1 km | MPC · JPL |
| 579716 | 2014 WS_{156} | — | September 11, 2010 | Mount Lemmon | Mount Lemmon Survey | · | 640 m | MPC · JPL |
| 579717 | 2014 WT_{161} | — | October 25, 2014 | Mount Lemmon | Mount Lemmon Survey | · | 1.1 km | MPC · JPL |
| 579718 | 2014 WA_{165} | — | April 9, 2003 | Kitt Peak | Spacewatch | · | 1.4 km | MPC · JPL |
| 579719 | 2014 WX_{166} | — | October 17, 2010 | Mount Lemmon | Mount Lemmon Survey | · | 950 m | MPC · JPL |
| 579720 | 2014 WF_{175} | — | August 25, 2014 | Haleakala | Pan-STARRS 1 | · | 1.2 km | MPC · JPL |
| 579721 | 2014 WN_{176} | — | March 2, 2009 | Mount Lemmon | Mount Lemmon Survey | · | 1.3 km | MPC · JPL |
| 579722 | 2014 WX_{176} | — | October 14, 2001 | Apache Point | SDSS Collaboration | · | 1.4 km | MPC · JPL |
| 579723 | 2014 WL_{181} | — | August 25, 2014 | Haleakala | Pan-STARRS 1 | · | 920 m | MPC · JPL |
| 579724 Rómerflóris | 2014 WM_{183} | Rómerflóris | March 18, 2012 | Piszkéstető | S. Kürti, K. Sárneczky | · | 1.4 km | MPC · JPL |
| 579725 | 2014 WR_{183} | — | March 16, 2012 | Piszkéstető | K. Sárneczky | · | 1.5 km | MPC · JPL |
| 579726 | 2014 WV_{183} | — | December 25, 2006 | Catalina | CSS | MAR | 1.2 km | MPC · JPL |
| 579727 | 2014 WJ_{185} | — | October 16, 2001 | Palomar | NEAT | · | 1.6 km | MPC · JPL |
| 579728 | 2014 WN_{196} | — | August 15, 2009 | Kitt Peak | Spacewatch | · | 1.5 km | MPC · JPL |
| 579729 | 2014 WS_{196} | — | December 24, 2006 | Kitt Peak | Spacewatch | · | 1.4 km | MPC · JPL |
| 579730 | 2014 WO_{199} | — | March 8, 2003 | Socorro | LINEAR | · | 1.5 km | MPC · JPL |
| 579731 | 2014 WR_{200} | — | October 11, 2007 | Catalina | CSS | · | 710 m | MPC · JPL |
| 579732 | 2014 WV_{200} | — | October 18, 2014 | Kitt Peak | Spacewatch | H | 400 m | MPC · JPL |
| 579733 | 2014 WC_{215} | — | December 26, 2006 | Kitt Peak | Spacewatch | · | 1.5 km | MPC · JPL |
| 579734 | 2014 WJ_{217} | — | October 14, 2013 | Mount Lemmon | Mount Lemmon Survey | L5 | 8.2 km | MPC · JPL |
| 579735 | 2014 WM_{218} | — | June 22, 2010 | Mount Lemmon | Mount Lemmon Survey | · | 990 m | MPC · JPL |
| 579736 | 2014 WQ_{220} | — | October 3, 2005 | Kitt Peak | Spacewatch | · | 1.4 km | MPC · JPL |
| 579737 | 2014 WC_{221} | — | January 19, 2012 | Haleakala | Pan-STARRS 1 | · | 880 m | MPC · JPL |
| 579738 | 2014 WN_{221} | — | September 30, 2010 | Mount Lemmon | Mount Lemmon Survey | · | 1.3 km | MPC · JPL |
| 579739 | 2014 WJ_{227} | — | October 20, 2003 | Palomar | NEAT | · | 1.1 km | MPC · JPL |
| 579740 | 2014 WC_{232} | — | September 15, 2010 | Mount Lemmon | Mount Lemmon Survey | V | 520 m | MPC · JPL |
| 579741 | 2014 WX_{232} | — | September 5, 2010 | Mount Lemmon | Mount Lemmon Survey | · | 1.0 km | MPC · JPL |
| 579742 Annamareike | 2014 WH_{233} | Annamareike | November 19, 2014 | iTelescope | J. Jahn | · | 1.2 km | MPC · JPL |
| 579743 | 2014 WU_{238} | — | January 9, 2002 | Kitt Peak | Spacewatch | · | 1.3 km | MPC · JPL |
| 579744 | 2014 WV_{239} | — | February 6, 2007 | Mount Lemmon | Mount Lemmon Survey | · | 1.2 km | MPC · JPL |
| 579745 | 2014 WY_{241} | — | November 7, 2010 | Mount Lemmon | Mount Lemmon Survey | JUN | 900 m | MPC · JPL |
| 579746 | 2014 WM_{244} | — | April 15, 2010 | Mount Lemmon | Mount Lemmon Survey | PHO | 720 m | MPC · JPL |
| 579747 | 2014 WY_{248} | — | January 4, 2011 | Mount Lemmon | Mount Lemmon Survey | · | 1.9 km | MPC · JPL |
| 579748 | 2014 WT_{252} | — | December 18, 2007 | Mount Lemmon | Mount Lemmon Survey | · | 1.1 km | MPC · JPL |
| 579749 | 2014 WF_{254} | — | December 6, 2010 | Mount Lemmon | Mount Lemmon Survey | · | 1.1 km | MPC · JPL |
| 579750 | 2014 WH_{254} | — | September 6, 2008 | Mount Lemmon | Mount Lemmon Survey | · | 1.6 km | MPC · JPL |
| 579751 | 2014 WV_{258} | — | February 3, 2008 | Mount Lemmon | Mount Lemmon Survey | · | 1.3 km | MPC · JPL |
| 579752 | 2014 WN_{262} | — | June 21, 2010 | Mount Lemmon | Mount Lemmon Survey | · | 660 m | MPC · JPL |
| 579753 | 2014 WL_{264} | — | November 21, 2014 | Haleakala | Pan-STARRS 1 | · | 900 m | MPC · JPL |
| 579754 | 2014 WG_{267} | — | January 8, 2011 | Mount Lemmon | Mount Lemmon Survey | · | 1.3 km | MPC · JPL |
| 579755 | 2014 WH_{268} | — | April 29, 2008 | Kitt Peak | Spacewatch | MAR | 710 m | MPC · JPL |
| 579756 | 2014 WQ_{268} | — | May 28, 2008 | Mount Lemmon | Mount Lemmon Survey | EUN | 830 m | MPC · JPL |
| 579757 | 2014 WN_{269} | — | December 2, 2010 | Mount Lemmon | Mount Lemmon Survey | · | 990 m | MPC · JPL |
| 579758 | 2014 WP_{283} | — | November 20, 2006 | Kitt Peak | Spacewatch | · | 950 m | MPC · JPL |
| 579759 | 2014 WO_{287} | — | March 9, 2003 | Palomar | NEAT | · | 2.1 km | MPC · JPL |
| 579760 | 2014 WG_{288} | — | March 13, 2004 | Palomar | NEAT | EUN | 1.4 km | MPC · JPL |
| 579761 | 2014 WU_{289} | — | December 10, 2010 | Mount Lemmon | Mount Lemmon Survey | EUN | 990 m | MPC · JPL |
| 579762 | 2014 WW_{300} | — | July 29, 2014 | Haleakala | Pan-STARRS 1 | · | 2.0 km | MPC · JPL |
| 579763 | 2014 WJ_{302} | — | February 1, 2006 | Kitt Peak | Spacewatch | EOS | 1.8 km | MPC · JPL |
| 579764 | 2014 WV_{305} | — | December 5, 2007 | Kitt Peak | Spacewatch | · | 1.2 km | MPC · JPL |
| 579765 | 2014 WE_{309} | — | September 2, 2014 | Haleakala | Pan-STARRS 1 | · | 1.1 km | MPC · JPL |
| 579766 | 2014 WR_{312} | — | October 23, 2003 | Apache Point | SDSS Collaboration | · | 1.2 km | MPC · JPL |
| 579767 | 2014 WT_{314} | — | October 20, 2003 | Kitt Peak | Spacewatch | V | 690 m | MPC · JPL |
| 579768 | 2014 WO_{315} | — | August 30, 2014 | Haleakala | Pan-STARRS 1 | · | 1.2 km | MPC · JPL |
| 579769 | 2014 WQ_{321} | — | October 29, 2014 | Haleakala | Pan-STARRS 1 | PHO | 720 m | MPC · JPL |
| 579770 | 2014 WD_{328} | — | March 25, 2012 | Mount Lemmon | Mount Lemmon Survey | · | 850 m | MPC · JPL |
| 579771 | 2014 WL_{334} | — | September 4, 2014 | Haleakala | Pan-STARRS 1 | · | 1.2 km | MPC · JPL |
| 579772 | 2014 WS_{339} | — | November 22, 2014 | Haleakala | Pan-STARRS 1 | EUN | 970 m | MPC · JPL |
| 579773 | 2014 WF_{343} | — | December 11, 2010 | Mount Lemmon | Mount Lemmon Survey | · | 1.3 km | MPC · JPL |
| 579774 | 2014 WK_{345} | — | April 15, 2012 | Haleakala | Pan-STARRS 1 | · | 1.0 km | MPC · JPL |
| 579775 | 2014 WV_{345} | — | April 27, 2012 | Haleakala | Pan-STARRS 1 | · | 1.1 km | MPC · JPL |
| 579776 | 2014 WC_{348} | — | March 10, 2008 | Kitt Peak | Spacewatch | · | 1.1 km | MPC · JPL |
| 579777 | 2014 WF_{351} | — | September 6, 2008 | Kitt Peak | Spacewatch | · | 2.4 km | MPC · JPL |
| 579778 | 2014 WE_{352} | — | July 1, 2013 | Haleakala | Pan-STARRS 1 | · | 1.0 km | MPC · JPL |
| 579779 | 2014 WU_{358} | — | October 26, 2014 | Mount Lemmon | Mount Lemmon Survey | · | 1.1 km | MPC · JPL |
| 579780 | 2014 WB_{359} | — | February 3, 2012 | Haleakala | Pan-STARRS 1 | · | 1.3 km | MPC · JPL |
| 579781 | 2014 WT_{361} | — | December 9, 2010 | Mount Lemmon | Mount Lemmon Survey | · | 1.2 km | MPC · JPL |
| 579782 | 2014 WU_{367} | — | November 22, 2014 | Haleakala | Pan-STARRS 1 | H | 410 m | MPC · JPL |
| 579783 | 2014 WK_{376} | — | November 1, 2006 | Kitt Peak | Spacewatch | MAS | 820 m | MPC · JPL |
| 579784 | 2014 WB_{380} | — | July 2, 2013 | Haleakala | Pan-STARRS 1 | · | 1.5 km | MPC · JPL |
| 579785 Kepesgyula | 2014 WT_{382} | Kepesgyula | October 7, 2010 | Piszkéstető | K. Sárneczky, Z. Kuli | V | 670 m | MPC · JPL |
| 579786 | 2014 WL_{384} | — | October 21, 2014 | Mount Lemmon | Mount Lemmon Survey | · | 730 m | MPC · JPL |
| 579787 Formentera | 2014 WN_{384} | Formentera | December 29, 2007 | Costitx | OAM | · | 1.2 km | MPC · JPL |
| 579788 | 2014 WW_{384} | — | November 23, 2014 | Mount Lemmon | Mount Lemmon Survey | · | 1.3 km | MPC · JPL |
| 579789 | 2014 WF_{386} | — | November 23, 2014 | Haleakala | Pan-STARRS 1 | · | 1.3 km | MPC · JPL |
| 579790 | 2014 WY_{386} | — | December 5, 2007 | Mount Lemmon | Mount Lemmon Survey | · | 1.4 km | MPC · JPL |
| 579791 | 2014 WQ_{389} | — | November 23, 2014 | Mount Lemmon | Mount Lemmon Survey | · | 2.2 km | MPC · JPL |
| 579792 | 2014 WG_{394} | — | October 28, 2014 | Haleakala | Pan-STARRS 1 | · | 1.2 km | MPC · JPL |
| 579793 | 2014 WE_{396} | — | October 12, 2006 | Palomar | NEAT | T_{j} (2.92) | 4.9 km | MPC · JPL |
| 579794 | 2014 WK_{399} | — | March 30, 2003 | Kitt Peak | Spacewatch | · | 1.2 km | MPC · JPL |
| 579795 | 2014 WG_{402} | — | May 30, 2009 | Mount Lemmon | Mount Lemmon Survey | L5 | 8.2 km | MPC · JPL |
| 579796 | 2014 WG_{404} | — | December 25, 2006 | Kitt Peak | Spacewatch | (5) | 1.1 km | MPC · JPL |
| 579797 | 2014 WT_{405} | — | September 15, 2009 | Mount Lemmon | Mount Lemmon Survey | · | 1.2 km | MPC · JPL |
| 579798 | 2014 WK_{408} | — | August 30, 2005 | Kitt Peak | Spacewatch | · | 1.2 km | MPC · JPL |
| 579799 | 2014 WA_{412} | — | January 10, 2007 | Mount Lemmon | Mount Lemmon Survey | · | 860 m | MPC · JPL |
| 579800 | 2014 WP_{415} | — | November 20, 2014 | Haleakala | Pan-STARRS 1 | L5 | 8.4 km | MPC · JPL |

== 579801–579900 ==
back to top

| Designation | | | Discovery | | | Properties | | Ref |
| Permanent | Provisional | Named after | Date | Site | Discoverer(s) | Category | Diam. | Ref |
|---|---|---|---|---|---|---|---|---|
| 579801 | 2014 WX_{416} | — | November 26, 2014 | Haleakala | Pan-STARRS 1 | · | 1.3 km | MPC · JPL |
| 579802 | 2014 WB_{418} | — | November 26, 2014 | Haleakala | Pan-STARRS 1 | · | 1.3 km | MPC · JPL |
| 579803 | 2014 WH_{419} | — | November 26, 2014 | Haleakala | Pan-STARRS 1 | · | 1.1 km | MPC · JPL |
| 579804 | 2014 WT_{420} | — | November 26, 2014 | Haleakala | Pan-STARRS 1 | · | 1.1 km | MPC · JPL |
| 579805 | 2014 WS_{421} | — | November 26, 2014 | Haleakala | Pan-STARRS 1 | · | 1.1 km | MPC · JPL |
| 579806 | 2014 WM_{423} | — | March 16, 2012 | Piszkéstető | K. Sárneczky | · | 1.7 km | MPC · JPL |
| 579807 | 2014 WQ_{424} | — | November 17, 2014 | Mount Lemmon | Mount Lemmon Survey | (5) | 1.1 km | MPC · JPL |
| 579808 | 2014 WF_{425} | — | August 27, 2005 | Palomar | NEAT | · | 1.1 km | MPC · JPL |
| 579809 | 2014 WQ_{426} | — | November 26, 2014 | Haleakala | Pan-STARRS 1 | · | 1.2 km | MPC · JPL |
| 579810 | 2014 WQ_{427} | — | April 8, 2002 | Palomar | NEAT | · | 2.4 km | MPC · JPL |
| 579811 | 2014 WT_{427} | — | July 24, 2003 | Palomar | NEAT | · | 2.8 km | MPC · JPL |
| 579812 | 2014 WD_{428} | — | February 26, 2011 | Kitt Peak | Spacewatch | · | 1.6 km | MPC · JPL |
| 579813 | 2014 WC_{429} | — | September 7, 2004 | Kitt Peak | Spacewatch | HNS | 1.4 km | MPC · JPL |
| 579814 | 2014 WO_{429} | — | March 9, 2003 | Anderson Mesa | LONEOS | · | 1.3 km | MPC · JPL |
| 579815 | 2014 WH_{436} | — | September 12, 2005 | Kitt Peak | Spacewatch | · | 1.4 km | MPC · JPL |
| 579816 | 2014 WG_{438} | — | November 4, 2014 | Mount Lemmon | Mount Lemmon Survey | · | 1.6 km | MPC · JPL |
| 579817 | 2014 WN_{443} | — | November 16, 2014 | Mount Lemmon | Mount Lemmon Survey | · | 1.0 km | MPC · JPL |
| 579818 | 2014 WO_{447} | — | May 12, 2012 | Haleakala | Pan-STARRS 1 | ADE | 1.6 km | MPC · JPL |
| 579819 | 2014 WT_{449} | — | November 3, 2010 | Mount Lemmon | Mount Lemmon Survey | · | 1.1 km | MPC · JPL |
| 579820 | 2014 WL_{451} | — | October 23, 2014 | Nogales | M. Schwartz, P. R. Holvorcem | · | 1.4 km | MPC · JPL |
| 579821 | 2014 WJ_{452} | — | December 5, 2010 | Mount Lemmon | Mount Lemmon Survey | · | 1.4 km | MPC · JPL |
| 579822 | 2014 WB_{454} | — | February 24, 2012 | Kitt Peak | Spacewatch | · | 1.4 km | MPC · JPL |
| 579823 | 2014 WH_{454} | — | December 10, 2010 | Mount Lemmon | Mount Lemmon Survey | · | 1.3 km | MPC · JPL |
| 579824 | 2014 WU_{456} | — | August 24, 2012 | Kitt Peak | Spacewatch | L5 | 7.4 km | MPC · JPL |
| 579825 | 2014 WN_{463} | — | March 23, 2012 | Mount Lemmon | Mount Lemmon Survey | · | 1 km | MPC · JPL |
| 579826 | 2014 WO_{464} | — | November 17, 2014 | Haleakala | Pan-STARRS 1 | · | 3.5 km | MPC · JPL |
| 579827 | 2014 WC_{467} | — | May 1, 2011 | Haleakala | Pan-STARRS 1 | · | 1.9 km | MPC · JPL |
| 579828 | 2014 WD_{467} | — | April 22, 2007 | Gaisberg | Gierlinger, R. | RAF | 790 m | MPC · JPL |
| 579829 | 2014 WJ_{467} | — | November 27, 2014 | Haleakala | Pan-STARRS 1 | · | 1.8 km | MPC · JPL |
| 579830 | 2014 WQ_{467} | — | October 23, 2001 | Palomar | NEAT | (5) | 1.7 km | MPC · JPL |
| 579831 | 2014 WM_{468} | — | January 20, 2002 | Anderson Mesa | LONEOS | · | 2.0 km | MPC · JPL |
| 579832 | 2014 WW_{476} | — | November 25, 2005 | Mount Lemmon | Mount Lemmon Survey | · | 1.6 km | MPC · JPL |
| 579833 | 2014 WL_{478} | — | March 11, 2011 | Catalina | CSS | EUN | 1.1 km | MPC · JPL |
| 579834 | 2014 WM_{478} | — | June 2, 2008 | Mount Lemmon | Mount Lemmon Survey | · | 2.3 km | MPC · JPL |
| 579835 | 2014 WZ_{478} | — | August 14, 2013 | ASC-Kislovodsk | Linkov, V., Polyakov, K. | PHO | 1.3 km | MPC · JPL |
| 579836 | 2014 WG_{480} | — | January 18, 2007 | Palomar | NEAT | · | 1.4 km | MPC · JPL |
| 579837 | 2014 WT_{480} | — | February 6, 2007 | Palomar | NEAT | H | 610 m | MPC · JPL |
| 579838 | 2014 WV_{480} | — | May 6, 2003 | Kitt Peak | Spacewatch | · | 1.9 km | MPC · JPL |
| 579839 | 2014 WB_{481} | — | November 28, 2014 | Haleakala | Pan-STARRS 1 | PHO | 890 m | MPC · JPL |
| 579840 | 2014 WZ_{482} | — | August 18, 2009 | Kitt Peak | Spacewatch | · | 1.3 km | MPC · JPL |
| 579841 | 2014 WP_{484} | — | October 27, 2005 | Kitt Peak | Spacewatch | · | 1.6 km | MPC · JPL |
| 579842 | 2014 WS_{484} | — | October 19, 2014 | Nogales | M. Schwartz, P. R. Holvorcem | · | 2.7 km | MPC · JPL |
| 579843 | 2014 WY_{486} | — | November 21, 2014 | Mount Lemmon | Mount Lemmon Survey | EUN | 1.2 km | MPC · JPL |
| 579844 | 2014 WM_{495} | — | October 30, 2005 | Mount Lemmon | Mount Lemmon Survey | · | 1.6 km | MPC · JPL |
| 579845 | 2014 WO_{495} | — | September 22, 2003 | Palomar | NEAT | · | 2.3 km | MPC · JPL |
| 579846 | 2014 WP_{499} | — | November 15, 2007 | Catalina | CSS | PHO | 780 m | MPC · JPL |
| 579847 | 2014 WL_{501} | — | January 24, 2007 | Mount Lemmon | Mount Lemmon Survey | · | 1.2 km | MPC · JPL |
| 579848 | 2014 WZ_{501} | — | October 21, 2014 | Catalina | CSS | T_{j} (2.96) | 2.6 km | MPC · JPL |
| 579849 | 2014 WL_{502} | — | December 5, 2007 | Mount Lemmon | Mount Lemmon Survey | · | 1.4 km | MPC · JPL |
| 579850 | 2014 WQ_{503} | — | September 18, 2014 | Haleakala | Pan-STARRS 1 | BAR | 950 m | MPC · JPL |
| 579851 | 2014 WO_{506} | — | January 16, 2007 | Mount Lemmon | Mount Lemmon Survey | · | 1.1 km | MPC · JPL |
| 579852 | 2014 WG_{512} | — | November 24, 2014 | Kitt Peak | Spacewatch | H | 400 m | MPC · JPL |
| 579853 | 2014 WN_{521} | — | November 21, 2014 | Haleakala | Pan-STARRS 1 | · | 1.2 km | MPC · JPL |
| 579854 | 2014 WM_{522} | — | November 28, 2014 | Mount Lemmon | Mount Lemmon Survey | · | 1.1 km | MPC · JPL |
| 579855 | 2014 WS_{522} | — | November 16, 2014 | Haleakala | Pan-STARRS 1 | · | 1.1 km | MPC · JPL |
| 579856 | 2014 WU_{524} | — | November 19, 2014 | Mount Lemmon | Mount Lemmon Survey | · | 1.0 km | MPC · JPL |
| 579857 | 2014 WB_{527} | — | October 15, 2001 | Palomar | NEAT | · | 1.5 km | MPC · JPL |
| 579858 | 2014 WQ_{527} | — | March 4, 1994 | Kitt Peak | Spacewatch | · | 1.3 km | MPC · JPL |
| 579859 | 2014 WB_{529} | — | January 24, 2007 | Mount Lemmon | Mount Lemmon Survey | · | 1.1 km | MPC · JPL |
| 579860 | 2014 WA_{533} | — | January 30, 2011 | Haleakala | Pan-STARRS 1 | · | 1.9 km | MPC · JPL |
| 579861 | 2014 WW_{534} | — | November 30, 2014 | Haleakala | Pan-STARRS 1 | · | 1.2 km | MPC · JPL |
| 579862 | 2014 WS_{536} | — | January 17, 2016 | Haleakala | Pan-STARRS 1 | · | 1.0 km | MPC · JPL |
| 579863 | 2014 WQ_{537} | — | November 24, 2014 | Mount Lemmon | Mount Lemmon Survey | MAR | 1.2 km | MPC · JPL |
| 579864 | 2014 WH_{539} | — | November 18, 2014 | Haleakala | Pan-STARRS 1 | · | 400 m | MPC · JPL |
| 579865 | 2014 WY_{539} | — | November 24, 2014 | Mount Lemmon | Mount Lemmon Survey | H | 460 m | MPC · JPL |
| 579866 | 2014 WW_{544} | — | November 21, 2014 | Haleakala | Pan-STARRS 1 | · | 2.1 km | MPC · JPL |
| 579867 | 2014 WY_{545} | — | November 26, 2014 | Haleakala | Pan-STARRS 1 | · | 1.3 km | MPC · JPL |
| 579868 | 2014 WD_{546} | — | November 20, 2014 | Mount Lemmon | Mount Lemmon Survey | · | 1.2 km | MPC · JPL |
| 579869 | 2014 WH_{557} | — | November 27, 2014 | Haleakala | Pan-STARRS 1 | · | 1.1 km | MPC · JPL |
| 579870 | 2014 WP_{562} | — | November 23, 2014 | Mount Lemmon | Mount Lemmon Survey | · | 1.2 km | MPC · JPL |
| 579871 | 2014 WR_{562} | — | November 18, 2014 | Haleakala | Pan-STARRS 1 | · | 1.7 km | MPC · JPL |
| 579872 | 2014 WF_{567} | — | November 26, 2014 | Haleakala | Pan-STARRS 1 | · | 1.3 km | MPC · JPL |
| 579873 | 2014 WQ_{567} | — | February 20, 2002 | Kitt Peak | Spacewatch | · | 1.5 km | MPC · JPL |
| 579874 | 2014 WQ_{569} | — | November 26, 2014 | Haleakala | Pan-STARRS 1 | · | 1.8 km | MPC · JPL |
| 579875 | 2014 WL_{571} | — | November 28, 2014 | Mount Lemmon | Mount Lemmon Survey | · | 1.4 km | MPC · JPL |
| 579876 | 2014 WY_{572} | — | November 20, 2014 | Haleakala | Pan-STARRS 1 | · | 820 m | MPC · JPL |
| 579877 | 2014 WA_{573} | — | November 21, 2014 | Haleakala | Pan-STARRS 1 | · | 1.2 km | MPC · JPL |
| 579878 | 2014 WV_{573} | — | November 23, 2014 | Haleakala | Pan-STARRS 1 | L5 | 8.7 km | MPC · JPL |
| 579879 | 2014 WX_{578} | — | November 26, 2014 | Haleakala | Pan-STARRS 1 | JUN | 820 m | MPC · JPL |
| 579880 | 2014 WH_{579} | — | November 29, 2014 | Kitt Peak | Spacewatch | · | 1.0 km | MPC · JPL |
| 579881 | 2014 WJ_{583} | — | November 20, 2014 | Haleakala | Pan-STARRS 1 | HNS | 910 m | MPC · JPL |
| 579882 | 2014 WF_{591} | — | November 21, 2014 | Haleakala | Pan-STARRS 1 | L5 | 7.2 km | MPC · JPL |
| 579883 | 2014 XK_{1} | — | November 21, 2014 | Haleakala | Pan-STARRS 1 | · | 1.3 km | MPC · JPL |
| 579884 | 2014 XP_{5} | — | December 1, 2014 | Kitt Peak | Spacewatch | · | 1.2 km | MPC · JPL |
| 579885 | 2014 XU_{5} | — | March 29, 2008 | Mount Lemmon | Mount Lemmon Survey | L5 | 9.8 km | MPC · JPL |
| 579886 | 2014 XJ_{7} | — | December 2, 2014 | Haleakala | Pan-STARRS 1 | L5 | 8.9 km | MPC · JPL |
| 579887 | 2014 XP_{9} | — | October 16, 2014 | Mount Lemmon | Mount Lemmon Survey | L5 | 8.6 km | MPC · JPL |
| 579888 | 2014 XB_{11} | — | December 18, 2001 | Kitt Peak | Spacewatch | HNS | 1.1 km | MPC · JPL |
| 579889 | 2014 XH_{14} | — | May 16, 2013 | Mount Lemmon | Mount Lemmon Survey | · | 680 m | MPC · JPL |
| 579890 Mocnik | 2014 XT_{14} | Mocnik | August 1, 2014 | La Palma | EURONEAR | RAF | 1.0 km | MPC · JPL |
| 579891 | 2014 XV_{19} | — | November 23, 2014 | Mount Lemmon | Mount Lemmon Survey | · | 570 m | MPC · JPL |
| 579892 | 2014 XG_{20} | — | April 1, 2008 | Kitt Peak | Spacewatch | · | 880 m | MPC · JPL |
| 579893 | 2014 XD_{22} | — | October 5, 2003 | Kitt Peak | Spacewatch | · | 1.1 km | MPC · JPL |
| 579894 | 2014 XN_{26} | — | November 26, 2014 | Haleakala | Pan-STARRS 1 | · | 1.7 km | MPC · JPL |
| 579895 | 2014 XK_{28} | — | October 11, 2010 | Mount Lemmon | Mount Lemmon Survey | · | 1.1 km | MPC · JPL |
| 579896 | 2014 XJ_{29} | — | November 20, 2014 | Haleakala | Pan-STARRS 1 | · | 3.8 km | MPC · JPL |
| 579897 | 2014 XR_{30} | — | September 4, 2002 | Palomar | NEAT | THB | 2.0 km | MPC · JPL |
| 579898 | 2014 XT_{31} | — | January 7, 2010 | Mount Lemmon | Mount Lemmon Survey | H | 410 m | MPC · JPL |
| 579899 | 2014 XQ_{34} | — | November 16, 2014 | Mount Lemmon | Mount Lemmon Survey | · | 1.7 km | MPC · JPL |
| 579900 | 2014 XV_{35} | — | October 24, 2013 | Mount Lemmon | Mount Lemmon Survey | L5 | 7.1 km | MPC · JPL |

== 579901–580000 ==
back to top

| Designation | | | Discovery | | | Properties | | Ref |
| Permanent | Provisional | Named after | Date | Site | Discoverer(s) | Category | Diam. | Ref |
|---|---|---|---|---|---|---|---|---|
| 579901 | 2014 XD_{39} | — | November 1, 1999 | Socorro | LINEAR | PHO | 1.1 km | MPC · JPL |
| 579902 | 2014 XM_{40} | — | October 3, 2013 | Kitt Peak | Spacewatch | L5 | 6.7 km | MPC · JPL |
| 579903 | 2014 XC_{42} | — | December 1, 2014 | Haleakala | Pan-STARRS 1 | · | 1.9 km | MPC · JPL |
| 579904 | 2014 XE_{42} | — | December 10, 2010 | Kitt Peak | Spacewatch | · | 1.2 km | MPC · JPL |
| 579905 | 2014 XE_{44} | — | December 13, 2014 | Haleakala | Pan-STARRS 1 | · | 1.2 km | MPC · JPL |
| 579906 | 2014 XE_{45} | — | December 1, 2014 | Haleakala | Pan-STARRS 1 | · | 1.3 km | MPC · JPL |
| 579907 | 2014 YE_{3} | — | May 3, 2005 | Kitt Peak | Spacewatch | · | 1.3 km | MPC · JPL |
| 579908 | 2014 YJ_{6} | — | January 24, 2002 | Kitt Peak | Spacewatch | · | 1.2 km | MPC · JPL |
| 579909 | 2014 YC_{7} | — | November 20, 2014 | Mount Lemmon | Mount Lemmon Survey | MAR | 910 m | MPC · JPL |
| 579910 | 2014 YH_{7} | — | May 1, 2012 | Mount Lemmon | Mount Lemmon Survey | · | 980 m | MPC · JPL |
| 579911 | 2014 YK_{7} | — | December 16, 1995 | Kitt Peak | Spacewatch | · | 1.1 km | MPC · JPL |
| 579912 | 2014 YL_{9} | — | January 13, 2003 | Kitt Peak | Spacewatch | · | 1.4 km | MPC · JPL |
| 579913 | 2014 YX_{10} | — | December 27, 2005 | Mount Lemmon | Mount Lemmon Survey | · | 2.0 km | MPC · JPL |
| 579914 | 2014 YL_{13} | — | November 29, 2014 | Haleakala | Pan-STARRS 1 | · | 1.5 km | MPC · JPL |
| 579915 | 2014 YZ_{14} | — | January 27, 2007 | Kitt Peak | Spacewatch | H | 440 m | MPC · JPL |
| 579916 | 2014 YV_{17} | — | January 28, 2007 | Mount Lemmon | Mount Lemmon Survey | · | 1 km | MPC · JPL |
| 579917 | 2014 YJ_{18} | — | January 24, 2011 | Mount Lemmon | Mount Lemmon Survey | · | 1.1 km | MPC · JPL |
| 579918 | 2014 YE_{22} | — | November 26, 2014 | Haleakala | Pan-STARRS 1 | · | 1.9 km | MPC · JPL |
| 579919 | 2014 YU_{25} | — | November 11, 2001 | Apache Point | SDSS Collaboration | · | 1.5 km | MPC · JPL |
| 579920 | 2014 YA_{27} | — | November 17, 2014 | Haleakala | Pan-STARRS 1 | · | 1.0 km | MPC · JPL |
| 579921 | 2014 YA_{28} | — | September 28, 2006 | Mount Lemmon | Mount Lemmon Survey | · | 1.3 km | MPC · JPL |
| 579922 | 2014 YO_{29} | — | October 4, 2005 | Mount Lemmon | Mount Lemmon Survey | · | 1.3 km | MPC · JPL |
| 579923 | 2014 YA_{30} | — | May 19, 2012 | Mount Lemmon | Mount Lemmon Survey | HNS | 970 m | MPC · JPL |
| 579924 | 2014 YQ_{30} | — | December 29, 2005 | Palomar | NEAT | EUN | 1.4 km | MPC · JPL |
| 579925 | 2014 YH_{32} | — | November 26, 2014 | Haleakala | Pan-STARRS 1 | · | 1.3 km | MPC · JPL |
| 579926 | 2014 YJ_{32} | — | November 22, 2014 | Haleakala | Pan-STARRS 1 | KRM | 1.9 km | MPC · JPL |
| 579927 | 2014 YW_{32} | — | March 12, 2003 | Kitt Peak | Spacewatch | · | 1.4 km | MPC · JPL |
| 579928 | 2014 YX_{32} | — | December 26, 2014 | Haleakala | Pan-STARRS 1 | H | 510 m | MPC · JPL |
| 579929 | 2014 YO_{36} | — | December 17, 2007 | Mount Lemmon | Mount Lemmon Survey | · | 570 m | MPC · JPL |
| 579930 | 2014 YW_{36} | — | April 21, 2012 | Mount Lemmon | Mount Lemmon Survey | MAR | 800 m | MPC · JPL |
| 579931 | 2014 YQ_{43} | — | December 30, 2014 | Mount Lemmon | Mount Lemmon Survey | · | 1.2 km | MPC · JPL |
| 579932 | 2014 YV_{44} | — | September 19, 2003 | Kitt Peak | Spacewatch | · | 900 m | MPC · JPL |
| 579933 | 2014 YG_{45} | — | October 30, 2005 | Catalina | CSS | · | 1.6 km | MPC · JPL |
| 579934 | 2014 YP_{45} | — | December 13, 2006 | Mount Lemmon | Mount Lemmon Survey | · | 990 m | MPC · JPL |
| 579935 | 2014 YQ_{46} | — | December 10, 2010 | Mount Lemmon | Mount Lemmon Survey | · | 1.2 km | MPC · JPL |
| 579936 | 2014 YY_{48} | — | November 26, 2014 | Haleakala | Pan-STARRS 1 | EUN | 1.3 km | MPC · JPL |
| 579937 | 2014 YF_{49} | — | February 17, 2002 | Palomar | NEAT | · | 1.6 km | MPC · JPL |
| 579938 | 2014 YW_{49} | — | March 11, 2007 | Kitt Peak | Spacewatch | · | 1.3 km | MPC · JPL |
| 579939 | 2014 YC_{51} | — | December 29, 2014 | Haleakala | Pan-STARRS 1 | H | 480 m | MPC · JPL |
| 579940 | 2014 YJ_{51} | — | November 30, 2014 | Haleakala | Pan-STARRS 1 | H | 520 m | MPC · JPL |
| 579941 | 2014 YL_{51} | — | June 30, 2008 | Kitt Peak | Spacewatch | H | 410 m | MPC · JPL |
| 579942 | 2014 YH_{53} | — | January 30, 2011 | Piszkés-tető | K. Sárneczky, S. Kürti | · | 860 m | MPC · JPL |
| 579943 | 2014 YW_{53} | — | November 4, 2005 | Mount Lemmon | Mount Lemmon Survey | · | 1.2 km | MPC · JPL |
| 579944 | 2014 YX_{53} | — | July 15, 2005 | Mount Lemmon | Mount Lemmon Survey | · | 1.5 km | MPC · JPL |
| 579945 | 2014 YJ_{54} | — | March 10, 2007 | Mount Lemmon | Mount Lemmon Survey | · | 1.3 km | MPC · JPL |
| 579946 | 2014 YL_{56} | — | December 21, 2014 | Mount Lemmon | Mount Lemmon Survey | · | 1.2 km | MPC · JPL |
| 579947 | 2014 YQ_{56} | — | December 29, 2014 | Haleakala | Pan-STARRS 1 | · | 1.6 km | MPC · JPL |
| 579948 | 2014 YA_{60} | — | October 10, 2004 | Kitt Peak | Deep Ecliptic Survey | · | 1.7 km | MPC · JPL |
| 579949 | 2014 YF_{61} | — | April 1, 2003 | Apache Point | SDSS | · | 1.3 km | MPC · JPL |
| 579950 | 2014 YT_{63} | — | October 9, 2013 | Mount Lemmon | Mount Lemmon Survey | · | 1.9 km | MPC · JPL |
| 579951 | 2014 YU_{64} | — | December 18, 2014 | Haleakala | Pan-STARRS 1 | · | 1.5 km | MPC · JPL |
| 579952 | 2014 YZ_{64} | — | December 18, 2014 | Haleakala | Pan-STARRS 1 | · | 580 m | MPC · JPL |
| 579953 | 2014 YF_{66} | — | December 20, 2014 | Haleakala | Pan-STARRS 1 | HNS | 820 m | MPC · JPL |
| 579954 | 2014 YM_{76} | — | December 24, 2014 | Mount Lemmon | Mount Lemmon Survey | · | 1.6 km | MPC · JPL |
| 579955 | 2014 YP_{76} | — | December 26, 2014 | Haleakala | Pan-STARRS 1 | · | 1.9 km | MPC · JPL |
| 579956 | 2014 YZ_{76} | — | December 21, 2014 | Mount Lemmon | Mount Lemmon Survey | · | 2.8 km | MPC · JPL |
| 579957 | 2014 YM_{77} | — | February 9, 2011 | Mount Lemmon | Mount Lemmon Survey | EUN | 1.0 km | MPC · JPL |
| 579958 | 2014 YN_{78} | — | December 28, 2014 | Mount Lemmon | Mount Lemmon Survey | · | 1.2 km | MPC · JPL |
| 579959 | 2014 YJ_{87} | — | December 29, 2014 | Haleakala | Pan-STARRS 1 | · | 1.7 km | MPC · JPL |
| 579960 | 2015 AM | — | October 2, 2014 | Haleakala | Pan-STARRS 1 | 3:2 | 4.7 km | MPC · JPL |
| 579961 | 2015 AW_{2} | — | September 20, 2011 | Haleakala | Pan-STARRS 1 | H | 390 m | MPC · JPL |
| 579962 | 2015 AD_{6} | — | August 17, 2009 | Siding Spring | SSS | (194) | 1.6 km | MPC · JPL |
| 579963 | 2015 AJ_{6} | — | October 4, 2014 | Haleakala | Pan-STARRS 1 | · | 1.4 km | MPC · JPL |
| 579964 | 2015 AW_{12} | — | September 18, 2009 | Mount Lemmon | Mount Lemmon Survey | MAR | 660 m | MPC · JPL |
| 579965 | 2015 AZ_{12} | — | December 1, 2014 | Haleakala | Pan-STARRS 1 | · | 1.4 km | MPC · JPL |
| 579966 | 2015 AG_{16} | — | October 16, 2001 | Palomar | NEAT | · | 1.3 km | MPC · JPL |
| 579967 | 2015 AV_{19} | — | November 16, 2006 | Catalina | CSS | · | 1.6 km | MPC · JPL |
| 579968 | 2015 AH_{21} | — | October 30, 2010 | Mount Lemmon | Mount Lemmon Survey | PHO | 850 m | MPC · JPL |
| 579969 | 2015 AY_{24} | — | September 23, 2004 | Kitt Peak | Spacewatch | · | 520 m | MPC · JPL |
| 579970 | 2015 AV_{32} | — | December 11, 2009 | Mount Lemmon | Mount Lemmon Survey | AGN | 970 m | MPC · JPL |
| 579971 | 2015 AK_{34} | — | November 25, 2009 | Kitt Peak | Spacewatch | · | 1.3 km | MPC · JPL |
| 579972 | 2015 AN_{39} | — | December 2, 2005 | Kitt Peak | Wasserman, L. H., Millis, R. L. | AGN | 940 m | MPC · JPL |
| 579973 | 2015 AT_{41} | — | December 21, 2014 | Mount Lemmon | Mount Lemmon Survey | MAR | 960 m | MPC · JPL |
| 579974 | 2015 AT_{45} | — | March 29, 2008 | Kitt Peak | Spacewatch | L5 | 7.2 km | MPC · JPL |
| 579975 | 2015 AA_{47} | — | October 26, 2014 | Mount Lemmon | Mount Lemmon Survey | · | 1.8 km | MPC · JPL |
| 579976 | 2015 AT_{48} | — | April 3, 2013 | Palomar | Palomar Transient Factory | H | 390 m | MPC · JPL |
| 579977 | 2015 AV_{49} | — | November 3, 2014 | Mount Lemmon | Mount Lemmon Survey | H | 420 m | MPC · JPL |
| 579978 | 2015 AP_{51} | — | March 5, 2008 | Mount Lemmon | Mount Lemmon Survey | · | 1.2 km | MPC · JPL |
| 579979 | 2015 AW_{54} | — | November 26, 2014 | Haleakala | Pan-STARRS 1 | · | 1.5 km | MPC · JPL |
| 579980 | 2015 AA_{56} | — | April 9, 2003 | Kitt Peak | Spacewatch | EUN | 1.1 km | MPC · JPL |
| 579981 | 2015 AY_{56} | — | November 9, 2009 | Mount Lemmon | Mount Lemmon Survey | · | 1.5 km | MPC · JPL |
| 579982 | 2015 AU_{61} | — | December 10, 2009 | Mount Lemmon | Mount Lemmon Survey | · | 1.8 km | MPC · JPL |
| 579983 | 2015 AH_{62} | — | July 13, 2013 | Mount Lemmon | Mount Lemmon Survey | · | 840 m | MPC · JPL |
| 579984 | 2015 AX_{67} | — | December 29, 2014 | Mount Lemmon | Mount Lemmon Survey | · | 1.5 km | MPC · JPL |
| 579985 | 2015 AU_{69} | — | December 11, 2009 | Mount Lemmon | Mount Lemmon Survey | · | 1.8 km | MPC · JPL |
| 579986 | 2015 AQ_{79} | — | October 22, 2006 | Mount Lemmon | Mount Lemmon Survey | · | 710 m | MPC · JPL |
| 579987 | 2015 AY_{82} | — | January 13, 2015 | Haleakala | Pan-STARRS 1 | (5) | 1.0 km | MPC · JPL |
| 579988 | 2015 AB_{87} | — | December 15, 2014 | Mount Lemmon | Mount Lemmon Survey | · | 570 m | MPC · JPL |
| 579989 | 2015 AR_{90} | — | August 31, 2005 | Palomar | NEAT | · | 1.3 km | MPC · JPL |
| 579990 | 2015 AT_{94} | — | June 2, 2013 | Mount Lemmon | Mount Lemmon Survey | MAR | 960 m | MPC · JPL |
| 579991 | 2015 AH_{95} | — | October 8, 2005 | Kitt Peak | Spacewatch | · | 1.1 km | MPC · JPL |
| 579992 | 2015 AY_{95} | — | May 12, 2012 | Mount Lemmon | Mount Lemmon Survey | HNS | 1.1 km | MPC · JPL |
| 579993 | 2015 AA_{96} | — | July 24, 2000 | Kitt Peak | Spacewatch | HNS | 1.1 km | MPC · JPL |
| 579994 | 2015 AQ_{97} | — | May 17, 2013 | Mount Lemmon | Mount Lemmon Survey | H | 360 m | MPC · JPL |
| 579995 | 2015 AJ_{101} | — | August 30, 2005 | Kitt Peak | Spacewatch | · | 640 m | MPC · JPL |
| 579996 | 2015 AD_{106} | — | December 21, 2014 | Mount Lemmon | Mount Lemmon Survey | · | 1.4 km | MPC · JPL |
| 579997 | 2015 AK_{110} | — | January 14, 2015 | Haleakala | Pan-STARRS 1 | · | 1.1 km | MPC · JPL |
| 579998 | 2015 AG_{112} | — | November 24, 2014 | Mount Lemmon | Mount Lemmon Survey | · | 1.7 km | MPC · JPL |
| 579999 | 2015 AH_{119} | — | January 28, 2011 | Mount Lemmon | Mount Lemmon Survey | · | 1.2 km | MPC · JPL |
| 580000 | 2015 AN_{121} | — | November 7, 2005 | Mauna Kea | A. Boattini | HOF | 2.0 km | MPC · JPL |

back to top

== Meaning of names ==
As minor planet discoveries are confirmed, they are given a permanent number by the IAU's Minor Planet Center (MPC), and the discoverers can then submit names for them, following the IAU's naming conventions. The list below concerns those minor planets in the specified number-range that have received names, and explains the meanings of those names.

Official naming citations of newly named small Solar System bodies are approved and published in a bulletin by IAU's Working Group for Small Bodies Nomenclature (WGSBN). Before May 2021, citations were published in MPC's Minor Planet Circulars for many decades. Recent citations can also be found on the JPL Small-Body Database (SBDB). Until his death in 2016, German astronomer Lutz D. Schmadel compiled these citations into the Dictionary of Minor Planet Names (DMP) and regularly updated the collection.

Based on Paul Herget's The Names of the Minor Planets, Schmadel also researched the unclear origin of numerous asteroids, most of which had been named prior to World War II. This article incorporates text from this source, which is in the public domain: SBDB New namings may only be added to this list below after official publication as the preannouncement of names is condemned. The WGSBN publishes a comprehensive guideline for the naming rules of non-cometary small Solar System bodies.

| Named minor planet | Provisional | This minor planet was named for... | Ref · Catalog |
|---|---|---|---|
| 579724 Rómerflóris | 2014 WM_{183} | Flóris Rómer (1815–1889), Benedictine monk, archaeologist, art historian, university professor and the father of Hungarian archaeology. | IAU · 579724 |
| 579742 Annamareike | 2014 WH_{233} | Anna Mareike Jahn, daughter of the discoverer. | IAU · 579742 |
| 579785 Kepesgyula | 2014 WT_{382} | Gyula Kepes (1847–1924), a Hungarian doctor. | IAU · 579785 |
| 579787 Formentera | 2014 WN_{384} | The island of Formentera is the fourth largest in the Balearic archipelago. | IAU · 579787 |
| 579890 Mocnik | 2014 XT_{14} | Teo Močnik (born 1989), a Slovenian astronomer and discoverer of minor planets with EURONEAR. He studied exoplanets at Gemini North Observatory, Hawaii. | IAU · 579890 |
