= List of named minor planets: F =

This is a partial list of named minor planets, containing all those starting with the letter F, as of 7 September 2026. It is ordered in a case-insensitive, alphabetical manner and contains a total of 684 entries. Grey minor planets have no article and redirect to the list of minor planets instead (see List of minor planets § Main index).

== F ==
- 12044 Fabbri
- 283277 Faber
- 25157 Fabian
- 34317 Fabianmak
- 126160 Fabienkuntz
- 3645 Fabini
- 26177 Fabiodolfi
- 55810 Fabiofazio
- 31960 Fabioferrari
- 1576 Fabiola
- 27341 Fabiomuzzi
- 7055 Fabiopagan
- 20057 Fabiorubeo
- 1649 Fabre
- 18649 Fabrega
- 5221 Fabribudweis
- 20400 Fabricius
- 589253 Fabrika
- 16690 Fabritius
- 212176 Fabriziospaziani
- 410619 Fabry
- 11142 Facchini
- 541741 Fado
- 333536 Faelan
- 27959 Fagioli
- 1593 Fagnes
- 9021 Fagus
- 288478 Fahlman
- 7536 Fahrenheit
- 553035 Faikmusayev
- 751 Faïna
- 649981 Fainarubleva
- 204873 FAIR
- 67235 Fairbank
- 18964 Fairhurst
- 353429 Fairlamb
- 21424 Faithchang
- 868690 Fajardo-Acosta
- 22898 Falce
- 656196 Falchi
- 7963 Falcinelli
- 60183 Falcone
- 37646 Falconscott
- 233943 Falera
- 48480 Falk
- 333506 Falkenstern
- 14025 Fallada
- 10740 Fallersleben
- 15617 Fallowfield
- 6640 Falorni
- 14336 Falquero
- 4663 Falta
- 113659 Faltona
- 120324 Falusandrás
- 9838 Falz-Fein
- 408 Fama
- 151590 Fan
- 3478 Fanale
- 1589 Fanatica
- 16435 Fándly
- 185538 Fangcheng
- 31312 Fangerhai
- 5306 Fangfen
- 212795 Fangjiancheng
- 25043 Fangxing
- 215021 Fanjingshan
- 381323 Fanjinshi
- 821 Fanny
- 9331 Fannyhensel
- 21375 Fanshawe
- 1224 Fantasia
- 10311 Fantin-Latour
- 242492 Fantomas
- 21815 Fanyang
- 4554 Fanynka
- 34471 Fanyueyang
- 37582 Faraday
- 202505 Farhang
- 3248 Farinella
- 33817 Fariswald
- 240757 Farkasberci
- 6271 Farmer
- 16946 Farnham
- 84100 Farnocchia
- 9358 Fårö
- 23989 Farpoint
- 5256 Farquhar
- 412536 Farquharson
- 7501 Farra
- 16127 Farzan-Kashani
- 11997 Fassel
- 27719 Fast
- 17712 Fatherwilliam
- 866 Fatme
- 20394 Fatou
- 224591 Fattig
- 2583 Fatyanov
- 47144 Faulkes
- 8685 Fauré
- 798737 Faustina
- 214820 Faustocoppi
- 243285 Fauvaud
- 11849 Fauvel
- 5077 Favaloro
- 4820 Fay
- 1418 Fayeta
- 22633 Fazio
- 12535 Fazlurahman
- 21495 Feaga
- 10985 Feast
- 6177 Fécamp
- 11041 Fechner
- 2533 Fechtig
- 274810 Fedáksári
- 3195 Fedchenko
- 28509 Feddersen
- 4726 Federer
- 12817 Federica
- 118235 Federico
- 702688 Federicocolombo
- 133296 Federicotosi
- 25639 Fedina
- 29628 Fedorets
- 15695 Fedorshpig
- 7741 Fedoseev
- 11445 Fedotov
- 1984 Fedynskij
- 19575 Feeny
- 3433 Fehrenbach
- 58364 Feierberg
- 7147 Feijth
- 9512 Feijunlong
- 15569 Feinberg
- 19461 Feingold
- 6653 Feininger
- 21721 Feiniqu
- 10988 Feinstein
- 28954 Feiyiou
- 325462 Felanitx
- 10666 Feldberg
- 34675 Feldbush
- 3658 Feldman
- 7838 Feliceierman
- 294 Felicia
- 3927 Feliciaplatt
- 20305 Feliciayen
- 13520 Félicienrops
- 109 Felicitas
- 5940 Feliksobolev
- 1664 Felix
- 239716 Felixbaumgartner
- 9757 Felixdejager
- 69556 Félixdelafuente
- 10660 Felixhormuth
- 552888 Felixrodriguez
- 33415 Felixwang
- 21276 Feller
- 5150 Fellini
- 589887 Fellnerjakab
- 8617 Fellous
- 33258 Femariebustos
- 204842 Fengchia
- 243546 Fengchuanliu
- 187709 Fengduan
- 121547 Fenghuotongxin
- 392655 Fengmin
- 18561 Fengningding
- 79811 Fengzikai
- 164405 Fennell
- 1453 Fennia
- 7708 Fennimore
- 17951 Fenska
- 31415 Fenucci
- 115254 Fényi
- 1048 Feodosia
- 43790 Ferdinandbraun
- 204370 Ferdinandvaněk
- 492786 Ferdowsi
- 11584 Ferenczi
- 34083 Feretova
- 578622 Fergezsuzsa
- 1745 Ferguson
- 9465 Fergusonsam
- 32931 Ferioli
- 44360 Ferlet
- 12007 Fermat
- 8103 Fermi
- 11998 Fermilab
- 26984 Fernand-Roland
- 9346 Fernandel
- 30720 Fernándezlajús
- 31493 Fernando-Peiris
- 17121 Fernandonido
- 20327 Fernandotinaut
- 2496 Fernandus
- 18055 Fernhildebrandt
- 8875 Fernie
- 72 Feronia
- 161545 Ferrando
- 4122 Ferrari
- 327632 Ferrarini
- 5201 Ferraz-Mello
- 201511 Ferreret
- 3308 Ferreri
- 127737 Ferretti
- 13326 Ferri
- 10584 Ferrini
- 14005 Ferrínmoreiras
- 10937 Ferris
- 82927 Ferrucci
- 545560 Fersman
- 157020 Fertőszentmiklós
- 73442 Feruglio
- 110625 Feryalözel
- 2286 Fesenkov
- 15939 Fessenden
- 7983 Festin
- 4694 Festou
- 8806 Fetisov
- 12350 Feuchtwanger
- 7099 Feuerbach
- 10628 Feuerbacher
- 191282 Feustel
- 21457 Fevig
- 336694 Fey
- 22356 Feyerabend
- 7495 Feynman
- 3695 Fiala
- 33458 Fialkow
- 14007 Fiamingo
- 50729 Fiammetta
- 6765 Fibonacci
- 3475 Fichte
- 29736 Fichtelberg
- 10248 Fichtelgebirge
- 11698 Fichtelman
- 524 Fidelio
- 10123 Fideöja
- 37 Fides
- 318547 Fidrich
- 380 Fiducia
- 14825 Fieber-Beyer
- 2314 Field
- 15986 Fienga
- 48782 Fierz
- 5365 Fievez
- 438523 Figalli
- 1099 Figneria
- 213770 Fignon
- 25488 Figueiredo
- 5316 Filatov
- 229440 Filimon
- 34586 Filipemonteiro
- 2892 Filipenko
- 28276 Filipnaiser
- 1616 Filipoff
- 126177 Filippofrontera
- 13088 Filipportera
- 20344 Filippotusberti
- 37358 Filippromanov
- 21687 Filopanti
- 287711 Filotáslili
- 79826 Finardi
- 101723 Finger
- 795 Fini
- 10891 Fink
- 151657 Finkbeiner
- 5706 Finkelstein
- 1794 Finsen
- 25298 Fionapaine
- 24351 Fionawood
- 34497 Fionnferreira
- 483951 Fiorella
- 13638 Fiorenza
- 4231 Fireman
- 30585 Firenze
- 34236 Firester
- 25492 Firnberg
- 7722 Firneis
- 20346 Firre
- 42482 Fischer-Dieskau
- 207013 Fischetti
- 21451 Fisher
- 21396 Fisher-Ives
- 22623 Fisico
- 475696 Fisiocritico
- 3665 Fitzgerald
- 8330 Fitzroy
- 4985 Fitzsimmons
- 3342 Fivesparks
- 590761 Fixin
- 43955 Fixlmüller
- 69870 Fizeau
- 9040 Flacourtia
- 2118 Flagstaff
- 6582 Flagsymphony
- 18099 Flamini
- 1021 Flammario
- 8752 Flammeus
- 4987 Flamsteed
- 90717 Flanders
- 18368 Flandrau
- 11379 Flaubert
- 2588 Flavia
- 18200 Flaviarommel
- 8453 Flaviataldini
- 7156 Flaviofusipecci
- 14065 Flegel
- 12218 Fleischer
- 91006 Fleming
- 14632 Flensburg
- 9359 Fleringe
- 3265 Fletcher
- 22366 Flettner
- 349606 Fleurance
- 255019 Fleurmaxwell
- 34689 Flewelling
- 10203 Flinders
- 552420 Flodubeyjames
- 1736 Floirac
- 4220 Flood
- 8 Flora
- 189188 Floraliën
- 28343 Florcalandra
- 614470 Flordeneu
- 3518 Florena
- 3122 Florence
- 365786 Florencelosse
- 321 Florentina
- 197864 Florentpagny
- 8430 Florey
- 551091 Flórferenc
- 800457 Floriangoebel
- 52602 Floriansignoret
- 1689 Floris-Jan
- 2302 Florya
- 6689 Floss
- 770175 Flueras
- 225254 Flury
- 2994 Flynn
- 72912 Fobarsti
- 20348 Fodde
- 11021 Foderà
- 6771 Foerster
- 2181 Fogelin
- 8616 Fogelquist
- 5323 Fogh
- 9102 Foglar
- 13147 Foglia
- 28073 Fohner
- 28805 Föhring
- 7006 Folco
- 549961 Földesistván
- 10129 Fole
- 187679 Folinsbee
- 10900 Folkner
- 363582 Folpotat
- 17952 Folsom
- 813688 Fongfeifei
- 5198 Fongyunwah
- 338373 Fonóalbert
- 374338 Fontana
- 8667 Fontane
- 10069 Fontenelle
- 4334 Foo
- 21409 Forbes
- 181702 Forcalquier
- 13852 Ford
- 181494 Forestale
- 18122 Forestamartin
- 277106 Forgó
- 11333 Forman
- 579787 Formentera
- 11360 Formigine
- 13248 Fornasier
- 7629 Foros
- 28397 Forrestbetton
- 8025 Forrestpeterson
- 3223 Forsius
- 1054 Forsytia
- 41986 Fort Bend
- 8780 Forte
- 3813 Fortov
- 9548 Fortran
- 19 Fortuna
- 184318 Fosanelli
- 8076 Foscarini
- 24946 Foscolo
- 2789 Foshan
- 24654 Fossett
- 23032 Fossey
- 635478 Fotonikalv
- 5668 Foucault
- 10994 Fouchard
- 11670 Fountain
- 20898 Fountainhills
- 13180 Fourcroy
- 10101 Fourier
- 6288 Fouts
- 2762 Fowler
- 16248 Fox
- 3625 Fracastoro
- 6085 Fraethi
- 1105 Fragaria
- 8235 Fragonard
- 4859 Fraknoi
- 6230 Fram
- 265924 Franceclemente
- 11625 Francelinda
- 84339 Francescaballi
- 112337 Francescaguerra
- 296928 Francescopalla
- 18583 Francescopedani
- 22598 Francespearl
- 2133 Franceswright
- 11596 Francetic
- 1212 Francette
- 15022 Francinejackson
- 211106 Francinewetzel
- 42929 Francini
- 2050 Francis
- 85495 Franciscabrel
- 28864 Franciscocordova
- 752263 Franciscosánchez
- 7115 Franciscuszeno
- 61402 Franciseveritt
- 22148 Francislee
- 444419 Francismccubbin
- 95802 Francismuir
- 175920 Francisnimmo
- 22341 Francispoulenc
- 9830 Franciswasiak
- 20610 Franciswilliams
- 4546 Franck
- 160512 Franck-Hertz
- 230155 Francksallet
- 302932 Francoballoni
- 10567 Francobressan
- 300226 Francocanepari
- 7831 François-Xavier
- 63609 Françoisecolas
- 44041 Françoiselaunay
- 225991 Françoisforget
- 7865 Françoisgros
- 21685 Francomallia
- 25601 Francopacini
- 22860 Francylemp
- 16252 Franfrost
- 25371 Frangaley
- 125476 Frangarcia
- 339008 Frankbeaurepaire
- 18095 Frankblock
- 487761 Frankbrandner
- 21470 Frankchuang
- 27264 Frankclayton
- 43083 Frankconrad
- 4772 Frankdrake
- 2824 Franke
- 10246 Frankenwald
- 204852 Frankfurt
- 115561 Frankherbert
- 31098 Frankhill
- 9662 Frankhubbard
- 13439 Frankiethomas
- 40463 Frankkameny
- 66846 Franklederer
- 1925 Franklin-Adams
- 982 Franklina
- 2845 Franklinken
- 90396 Franklopez
- 12142 Franklow
- 34273 Franklynwang
- 24671 Frankmartin
- 30068 Frankmelillo
- 331341 Frankscholten
- 18238 Frankshu
- 7085 Franksienkiewicz
- 17028 Frankstadermann
- 130007 Frankteti
- 12077 Frankthorne
- 21789 Frankwasser
- 11689 Frankxu
- 47852 Frankydubois
- 120038 Franlainsher
- 21466 Franpelrine
- 293985 Franquin
- 34527 Fransanmartins
- 10981 Fransaris
- 12638 Fransbrüggen
- 66939 Franscini
- 11242 Franspost
- 12941 Franssnik
- 13101 Fransson
- 3917 Franz Schubert
- 862 Franzia
- 520 Franziska
- 3183 Franzkaiser
- 15282 Franzmarc
- 65694 Franzrosenzweig
- 6212 Franzthaler
- 20246 Frappa
- 826631 Frascati
- 13208 Fraschetti
- 622398 Fraser
- 158092 Frasercain
- 34138 Frasso Sabino
- 309 Fraternitas
- 269548 Fratyu
- 270601 Frauenstein
- 13478 Fraunhofer
- 10323 Frazer
- 21537 Fréchet
- 1093 Freda
- 127477 Fredalee
- 5253 Fredclifford
- 23882 Fredcourant
- 17473 Freddiemercury
- 133527 Fredearly
- 678 Fredegundis
- 95449 Frederickgregory
- 46095 Frédérickoby
- 301128 Frédéricpont
- 437192 Frederikolsen
- 4418 Fredfranklin
- 6375 Fredharris
- 21659 Fredholm
- 708341 Fredjudson
- 19354 Fredkoehler
- 20608 Fredmerlin
- 152641 Fredreed
- 41943 Fredrick
- 11795 Fredrikbruhn
- 20313 Fredrikson
- 7065 Fredschaaf
- 11766 Fredseares
- 333268 Frédséguin
- 13859 Fredtreasure
- 5691 Fredwatson
- 22846 Fredwhitaker
- 4159 Freeman
- 21665 Frege
- 76 Freia
- 20593 Freilich
- 14940 Freiligrath
- 243073 Freistetter
- 9555 Frejakocha
- 3506 French
- 12651 Frenkel
- 4482 Frèrebasile
- 10303 Fréret
- 11289 Frescobaldi
- 10111 Fresnel
- 3369 Freuchen
- 4342 Freud
- 9689 Freudenthal
- 9873 Freundlich
- 210421 Freundtamás
- 5137 Frevert
- 242648 Fribourg
- 1561 Fricke
- 27792 Fridakahlo
- 34225 Fridberg
- 20426 Fridlund
- 3491 Fridolin
- 722 Frieda
- 26307 Friedafein
- 249523 Friedan
- 3642 Frieden
- 538 Friederike
- 745254 Friedhelm
- 3651 Friedman
- 5296 Friedrich
- 649964 Friedrichvolck
- 153284 Frieman
- 376299 Friesen
- 11801 Frigeri
- 77 Frigga
- 30306 Frigyesriesz
- 5115 Frimout
- 709 Fringilla
- 360762 FRIPON
- 81947 Fripp
- 13977 Frisch
- 1253 Frisia
- 21541 Friskop
- 24967 Frištenský
- 10979 Fristephenson
- 210444 Frithjof
- 4394 Fritzheide
- 436048 Fritzhuber
- 196772 Fritzleiber
- 23111 Fritzperls
- 212705 Friûl
- 6666 Frö
- 10835 Fröbel
- 22474 Frobenius
- 8583 Froberger
- 10122 Fröding
- 4732 Froeschlé
- 10127 Fröjel
- 6165 Frolova
- 11520 Fromm
- 243637 Frosinone
- 854 Frostia
- 18635 Frouard
- 25543 Fruen
- 13869 Fruge
- 15604 Fruits
- 5190 Fry
- 31650 Frýdek-Místek
- 22495 Fubini
- 261291 Fucecchio
- 7891 Fuchie
- 11316 Fuchitatsuo
- 9638 Fuchs
- 546286 Fuchsjenő
- 2345 Fučik
- 28148 Fuentes
- 33972 Fuentesmuñoz
- 3996 Fugaku
- 6770 Fugate
- 11256 Fuglesang
- 281564 Fuhsiehhai
- 1584 Fuji
- 2184 Fujian
- 11255 Fujiiekio
- 24753 Fujikake
- 14425 Fujimimachi
- 8387 Fujimori
- 22385 Fujimoriboshi
- 21293 Fujimototoyoshi
- 23245 Fujimura
- 12408 Fujioka
- 5352 Fujita
- 6410 Fujiwara
- 22352 Fujiwarakenjiro
- 14911 Fukamatsu
- 4873 Fukaya
- 39809 Fukuchan
- 8043 Fukuhara
- 6924 Fukui
- 34031 Fukumitsu
- 11495 Fukunaga
- 8159 Fukuoka
- 46589 Fukusako
- 3915 Fukushima
- 129550 Fukuten
- 46609 Fukuzumi
- 3486 Fulchignoni
- 12846 Fullerton
- 20373 Fullmer
- 22963 Fuls
- 5785 Fulton
- 8224 Fultonwright
- 609 Fulvia
- 11465 Fulvio
- 79241 Fulviobressan
- 92585 Fumagalli
- 23455 Fumi
- 9186 Fumikotsukimoto
- 16723 Fumiofuke
- 27844 Fumitake
- 25892 Funabashi
- 6869 Funada
- 9842 Funakoshi
- 85970 Fundaçãoterra
- 824655 Funes
- 210434 Fungyuancheng
- 5712 Funke
- 194982 Furia
- 6511 Furmanov
- 313892 Furnish
- 6753 Fursenko
- 77560 Furusato
- 7505 Furusho
- 13815 Furuya
- 16759 Furuyama
- 727736 Fus
- 42747 Fuser
- 4778 Fuss
- 16507 Fuuren
- 15001 Fuzhou
- 55892 Fuzhougezhi
- 4371 Fyodorov
back to top

== See also ==
- List of minor planet discoverers
- List of observatory codes
- Meanings of minor planet names § Index
