= List of slow rotators (minor planets) =

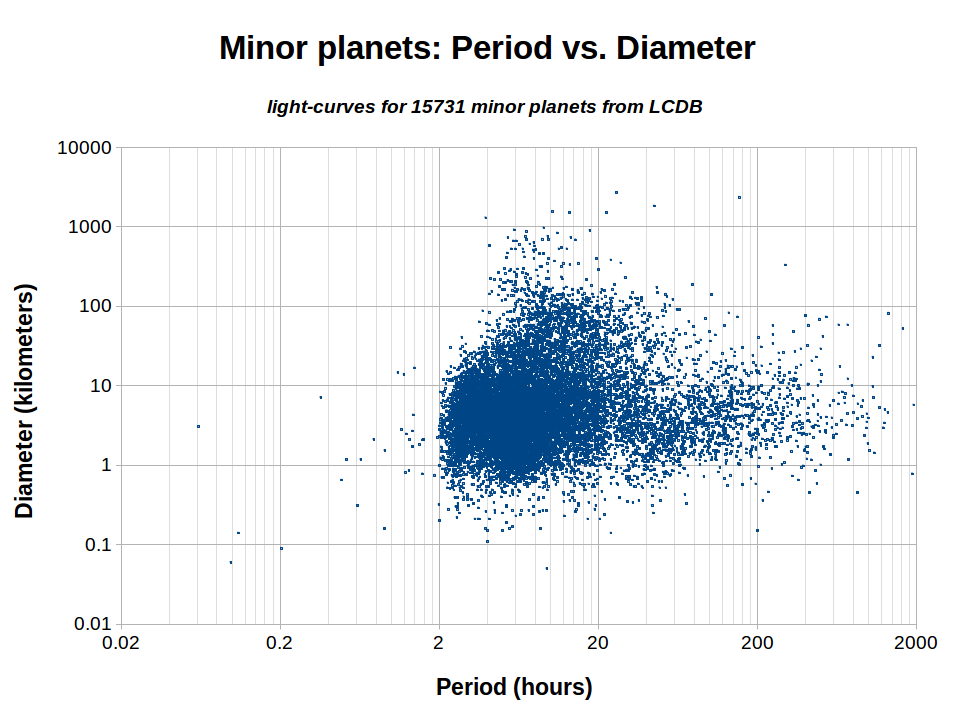
This plot shows the distribution of rotation periods for 15,000 minor planets, plotted against their diameters. Most bodies have a period between 2 and 20 hours. (Note: Data source, reference: Warner, B.D., Harris, A.W., Pravec, P. (2009). Icarus 202, 134–146. Updated 2016 September 6. See: www.MinorPlanet.info)

This is a list of slow rotators—minor planets that have an exceptionally long rotation period. This period, typically given in hours, and sometimes called rotation rate or spin rate, is a fundamental standard physical property for minor planets. In recent years, the periods of many thousands of bodies have been obtained from photometric and, to a lesser extent, radiometric observations.

The periods given in this list are sourced from the Light Curve Data Base (LCDB), which contains lightcurve data for more than 15,000 bodies. Most minor planets have rotation periods between 2 and 20 hours. As of 2019, a group of approximately 650 bodies, typically measuring 1–20 kilometers in diameter, have periods of more than 100 hours or 4 1/6 days. Among the slowest rotators, there are currently 15 bodies with a period longer than 1000 hours. According to the Minor Planet Center, the sharp lower limit of approximately 2.2 hours is due to the fact that most smaller bodies are thought to be rubble piles – conglomerations of smaller pieces, loosely coalesced under the influence of gravity – that fly apart if the period is shorter than this limit. The few minor planets rotating faster than 2.2 hours, therefore, can not be merely held together by self-gravity, but must be formed of a contiguous solid.

Potentially slow rotators have only an inaccurate period, estimated based on a fragmentary lightcurve and inconclusive measurement. They are listed separately from the more precise periods, which have a LCDB quality code, U, of 2 or 3 (unambiguous result). The periods for potentially slow rotators may be completely wrong (U = 1), have no complete and conclusive result (U = n.a.), or large error margins of more than 30% (U = 2−). A trailing plus sign (+) or minus sign (–) indicate slightly better or worse quality, respectively, than the unsigned value.

As with orbital periods, a rotational period can be sidereal or synodic to describe a full rotation with respect to the fixed stars (sidereal) and Sun (synodic), respectively. In most cases, the periods given in this list are synodic, not sidereal. However, in most cases the difference between these two different measures is not significant. This is the case for all main-belt asteroids, which account for 97.5% of all minor planets.

== Slowest rotators ==
This list contains the slowest-rotating minor planets with periods of at least 1000 hours, or 41 2/3 days. See § Potentially slow rotators for minor planets with an insufficiently accurate period—that is, a LCDB quality code of less than 2.

#	Minor planet designation	Rotation period (hours)	Δmag	Quality (U)	Orbit or family	Spectral type	Diameter (km)	Abs. mag (H)	Refs
1.	(162058) 1997 AE12	1880	0.60	2	NEO	S	0.78	17.90	LCDB · List
2.	846 Lipperta	1641	0.30	2	Themis	CBU:	52.41	10.26	LCDB · List
3.	2440 Educatio	1561	0.80	2	Flora	S	6.51	13.10	LCDB · List
4.	2056 Nancy	1343	0.68	3−	MBA (inner)	S	10.30	12.30	LCDB · List
5.	912 Maritima	1332	0.18	3−	MBA (outer)	C	82.14	9.30	LCDB · List
6.	9165 Raup	1320	1.34	3−	Hungaria	S	4.62	13.60	LCDB · List
7.	1235 Schorria	1265	1.40	3	Hungaria	CX:	5.04	13.10	LCDB · List
8.	50719 Elizabethgriffin	1256	0.42	2	Eunomia	S	3.40	14.65	LCDB · List
9.	(75482) 1999 XC173	1234.2	0.69	2	Vestian	S	2.96	15.01	LCDB · List
10.	288 Glauke	1170	0.90	3	MBA (outer)	S	32.24	10.00	LCDB · List
11.	(39546) 1992 DT5	1167.4	0.80	2	MBA (outer)	C	5.34	15.09	LCDB · List
12.	496 Gryphia	1072	1.25	3	Flora	S	15.47	11.61	LCDB · List
13.	4524 Barklajdetolli	1069	1.26	2	Flora	S	7.13	12.90	LCDB · List
14.	2675 Tolkien	1060	0.75	2+	Flora	S	9.85	12.20	LCDB · List
15.	(219774) 2001 YY145	1007.7	0.86	2	MBA (inner)	S	1.54	16.43	LCDB · List

back to top

== Periods between 500 and 1000 hours ==
#	Minor planet designation	Rotation period (hours)	Δmag	Quality (U)	Orbit or family	Spectral type	Diameter (km)	Abs. mag (H)	Refs
16.	(38063) 1999 FH	990	0.55	2	Mars crosser	S	3.92	14.40	LCDB · List
17.	(86106) 1999 RP_{113}	975.1	0.74	2	Eos	S	4.44	14.51	LCDB · List
18.	14436 Morishita	972.8	0.82	2	MBA (inner)	S	3.49	14.65	LCDB · List
19.	(87231) 2000 OB_{43}	967.3	0.58	2	Eunomia	S	2.94	14.97	LCDB · List
20.	(58651) 1997 WL_{42}	938.2	0.47	2	MBA (inner)	S	2.36	15.50	LCDB · List
21.	9000 Hal	908	0.90	2+	Flora	S	4.11	14.10	LCDB · List
22.	(42843) 1999 RV_{11}	894	1.32	2	Phocaea	S	3.49	14.50	LCDB · List
23.	3233 Krisbarons	888	1.44	2	Flora	S	6.51	13.10	LCDB · List
24.	(37586) 1991 BP_{2}	887	0.96	2+	Phocaea	S	5.53	13.50	LCDB · List
25.	831 Stateira	861	0.64	3−	Flora	S	6.81	13.00	LCDB · List
26.	2974 Holden	856	0.70	2+	Flora	S	6.21	13.20	LCDB · List
27.	(391033) 2005 TR_{15}	850	1.00	2	NEO	S	0.45	19.10	LCDB · List
28.	(29733) 1999 BA_{4}	849.2	0.74	2	Vestian	S	3.88	14.42	LCDB · List
29.	2672 Písek	831	0.90	2+	Eunomia	S	9.60	12.40	LCDB · List
30.	12867 Joeloic	813	0.71	2+	Flora	S	4.94	13.70	LCDB · List
31.	2862 Vavilov	800	0.40	2	Flora	S	7.82	12.70	LCDB · List
32.	(22166) 2000 WX_{154}	800	0.46	2	MBA (inner)	S	4.61	15.02	LCDB · List
33.	8109 Danielwilliam	790	0.60	2	Phocaea	S	3.17	14.71	LCDB · List
34.	(47069) 1998 XC_{73}	784.5	0.38	2	MBA (outer)	C	10.06	13.72	LCDB · List
35.	1663 van den Bos	740	0.80	3−	Flora	S	12.25	11.90	LCDB · List
36.	4902 Thessandrus	738	0.60	2	Jupiter trojan	C	61.04	9.80	LCDB · List
37.	(8615) 1979 MB2	731.3	1.16	2	MBA (inner)	S	4.45	14.12	LCDB · List
38.	35286 Takaoakihiro	724.1	0.93	2	Eunomia	S	3.22	14.77	LCDB · List
39.	(16896) 1998 DS9	708	0.43	3−	Phocaea	S	6.06	13.30	LCDB · List
40.	(49671) 1999 RP_{46}	700.1	0.68	2	Eos	S	7.14	13.48	LCDB · List
41.	(249838) 2001 OR_{104}	670.8	0.69	2	MBA (outer)	C	3.65	15.91	LCDB · List
42.	1479 Inkeri	660	1.30	2+	MBA (middle)	XFU	17.52	11.90	LCDB · List
43.	11774 Jerne	648.1	0.68	2	MBA (outer)	C	8.09	14.19	LCDB · List
44.	7352 Hypsenor	648	0.30	3−	Jupiter trojan	C	58.29	9.90	LCDB · List
45.	1144 Oda	648	0.55	2+	Hilda	D	57.65	9.90	LCDB · List
46.	(16276) 2000 JX_{61}	646.7	0.62	2	MBA (middle)	S	5.92	14.26	LCDB · List
47.	(119744) 2001 YN_{42}	625	0.52	2+	MBA (inner)	S	2.47	15.40	LCDB · List
48.	8054 Brentano	623.8	0.46	2	Flora	S	3.25	14.61	LCDB · List
49.	(12982) 1979 MS_{5}	601.9	0.86	2	Vestian	S	2.39	15.47	LCDB · List
50.	19640 Ethanroth	600.3	0.62	2	MBA (outer)	C	6.54	14.65	LCDB · List
51.	(37635) 1993 UJ_{1}	600	0.80	3	Hungaria	E	2.20	14.90	LCDB · List
52.	(10939) 1999 CJ_{19}	587.8	0.61	2	Flora	S	3.94	14.19	LCDB · List
53.	(218144) 2002 RL_{66}	587	0.32	3−	Mars crosser	S	2.97	15.00	LCDB · List
54.	(88242) 2001 CK_{35}	576	0.92	2	Hungaria	E	1.36	16.25	LCDB · List
55.	3448 Narbut	570.4	0.39	2	Flora	S	5.69	13.39	LCDB · List
56.	(23958) 1998 VD30	562	0.45	2	Jupiter trojan	C	50.77	10.20	LCDB · List
57.	27810 Daveturner	546	0.43	2+	Hungaria	E	3.35	14.30	LCDB · List
58.	1042 Amazone	540	0.25	2	MBA (outer)	C	73.59	9.90	LCDB · List
59.	(121293) 1999 RL_{182}	539.6	0.52	2	MBA (outer)	C	4.04	15.70	LCDB · List
60.	(230872) 2004 RG_{199}	535.1	0.66	2	MBA (outer)	C	2.73	16.55	LCDB · List
61.	(48376) 4044 T-3	535	1.31	2	Flora	S	2.73	14.99	LCDB · List
62.	23804 Haber	532.2	0.63	2	Vestian	S	2.68	15.22	LCDB · List
63.	(96590) 1998 XB	520	1.00	3	NEO	S	1.71	16.20	LCDB · List
64.	(283401) 2000 SV_{15}	502	0.37	2	Jupiter trojan	C	13.88	13.02	LCDB · List
65.	(9335) 1991 AA_{1}	500.6	0.88	2	MBA (outer)	C	11.33	13.46	LCDB · List
66.	6498 Ko	500	0.60	2	Flora	S	3.99	14.16	LCDB · List
67.	(90403) 2003 YE_{45}	500	0.81	2	NEO	S	0.90	17.60	LCDB · List

back to top

== Periods of 400+ hours ==
#	Minor planet designation	Rotation period (hours)	Δmag	Quality (U)	Orbit or family	Spectral type	Diameter (km)	Abs. mag (H)	Refs
68.	(279208) 2009 UQ_{35}	499.6	0.46	2	MBA (inner)	S	1.01	17.33	LCDB · List
69.	79316 Huangshan	493	0.62	2+	Hungaria	E	2.54	14.90	LCDB · List
70.	1220 Crocus	491.4	1.00	3	Eos	S	15.79	11.76	LCDB · List
71.	1256 Normannia	488.1	0.39	2	Hilda	D	69.02	10.02	LCDB · List
72.	(6840) 1995 WW5	482.3	0.46	2	Nysa	S	3.12	14.84	LCDB · List
73.	2696 Magion	480	0.31	2	Phocaea	S	10.06	12.20	LCDB · List
74.	5171 Augustesen	480	0.80	3	Vestian	S	6.50	13.30	LCDB · List
75.	19204 Joshuatree	480	0.95	2+	Phocaea	S	4.39	14.00	LCDB · List
76.	20862 Jenngoedhart	479.3	1.08	2	Flora	S	3.59	14.39	LCDB · List
77.	2759 Idomeneus	479	0.27	3−	Jupiter trojan	C	60.90	10.00	LCDB · List
78.	(215442) 2002 MQ_{3}	473	0.38	3	NEO	S	0.59	18.50	LCDB · List
79.	(23123) 2000 AU_{57}	467.3	0.57	2	Jupiter trojan	C	23.00	11.92	LCDB · List
80.	(327749) 2006 TA_{69}	463.7	0.83	2	Flora	S	0.86	17.50	LCDB · List
81.	6141 Durda	460	0.50	2+	Hungaria	E	3.35	14.30	LCDB · List
82.	6183 Viscome	453	0.90	3−	Mars crosser	S	5.41	13.70	LCDB · List
83.	2013 US_{3}	450	1.20	2	NEO	S	0.16	21.30	LCDB · MPC
84.	(93955) 2000 WT_{183}	449.5	0.62	2	MBA (outer)	C	5.80	14.91	LCDB · List
85.	(66092) 1998 SD	448	0.42	2	Hungaria	E	3.06	14.50	LCDB · List
86.	(98055) 2000 RR_{38}	447.6	0.40	2	MBA (inner)	S	2.36	15.50	LCDB · List
87.	(36103) 1999 RL_{116}	446.5	0.39	2	MBA (outer)	C	7.58	14.33	LCDB · List
88.	11351 Leucus	445.7	0.70	3−	Jupiter trojan	C	42.07	10.70	LCDB · List
89.	2747 Český Krumlov	438.7	0.63	2	MBA (outer)	C	20.62	12.16	LCDB · List
90.	(213480) 2002 EV_{148}	436.7	0.32	2	MBA (inner)	S	1.17	17.02	LCDB · List
91.	437 Rhodia	433.2	0.35	3−	MBA (inner)	S	14.46	10.71	LCDB · List
92.	319 Leona	430	0.50	3	MBA (outer)	C	68.01	10.10	LCDB · List
93.	(383702) 2007 TK_{436}	427.4	0.60	2	MBA (outer)	C	3.85	15.80	LCDB · List
94.	(122463) 2000 QP_{148}	426	1.13	2	Mars crosser	S	2.59	15.30	LCDB · List
95.	(463380) 2013 BY_{45}	425	0.49	2	NEO	S	0.45	19.10	LCDB · List
96.	3571 Milanstefanik	421.1	0.65	2+	Hilda	C	38.91	11.00	LCDB · List
97.	(27867) 1995 KF_{4}	418.9	0.37	2	Eunomia	S	5.25	13.71	LCDB · List
98.	5641 McCleese	418	1.30	2	Hungaria	A	3.67	14.10	LCDB · List
99.	253 Mathilde	417.7	0.50	3	MBA (middle)	C	57.87	10.30	LCDB · List
100.	17030 Sierks	416.2	0.31	2	MBA (outer)	C	10.57	13.61	LCDB · List
101.	707 Steina	414	1.00	2+	Flora	S	10.31	12.10	LCDB · List
102.	(87134) 2000 NS_{5}	412.7	0.84	2	MBA (middle)	S	3.61	15.33	LCDB · List
103.	9584 Louchheim	410	0.30	2	MBA (inner)	S	4.50	14.10	LCDB · List
104.	3759 Piironen	409.8	0.56	2	Eunomia	C	32.15	11.90	LCDB · List
105.	(221540) 2006 TG_{128}	408.9	0.83	2	Nysa	S	1.20	16.92	LCDB · List
106.	10684 Babkina	404.7	0.74	2	Flora	S	2.43	15.24	LCDB · List

back to top

== Periods of 300+ hours ==
#	Minor planet designation	Rotation period (hours)	Δmag	Quality (U)	Orbit or family	Spectral type	Diameter (km)	Abs. mag (H)	Refs
107.	(223665) 2004 PH_{37}	397.2	0.58	2	Eunomia	S	1.59	16.30	LCDB · List
108.	21432 Polingloh	393	0.73	2	Flora	S	1.52	16.25	LCDB · List
109.	(76800) 2000 OQ_{35}	392	1.40	3	Hungaria	E	2.54	14.90	LCDB · List
110.	22905 Liciniotoso	389.6	0.42	2	Flora	S	2.50	15.18	LCDB · List
111.	(172537) 2003 UH_{27}	386.9	0.62	2	Flora	S	0.98	17.20	LCDB · List
112.	(108163) 2001 HA_{6}	383.5	0.71	2	Eunomia	S	3.01	14.92	LCDB · List
113.	(192309) 1993 TK_{26}	383.3	0.80	2	MBA (outer)	C	3.38	16.08	LCDB · List
114.	(31182) 1997 YZ3	380	0.90	2	Hungaria	E	2.30	14.80	LCDB · List
115.	10331 Peterbluhm	379	1.10	2	Hilda	C	23.21	11.90	LCDB · List
115.	136199 Eris	378.9	0.06	3	TNO	(neutral)	2326.0	-1.21	LCDB · Eris
116.	(252079) 2000 SY_{306}	376	0.74	2	Flora	S	0.94	17.31	LCDB · List
117.	(184616) 2005 RE_{11}	375.4	0.86	2	Eos	S	2.88	15.46	LCDB · List
118.	(13331) 1998 SU_{52}	375	0.80	3−	Jupiter trojan	C	29.21	11.40	LCDB · List
119.	(15529) 2000 AA_{80}	375	0.59	2	Jupiter trojan	C	29.21	11.40	LCDB · List
120.	1750 Eckert	375	0.87	3−	Hungaria	S	6.97	13.15	LCDB · List
121.	(18058) 1999 XY_{129}	374.8	0.58	2	Jupiter trojan	C	18.30	12.42	LCDB · List
122.	5075 Goryachev	373	1.00	2	Nysa	S	5.28	13.70	LCDB · List
123.	8026 Johnmckay	372	1.00	3	Hungaria	E	2.54	14.90	LCDB · List
124.	(106723) 2000 WE_{179}	368.5	0.74	2	MBA (outer)	C	4.29	15.57	LCDB · List
125.	5851 Inagawa	367.5	0.90	3	Eunomia	S	9.60	12.40	LCDB · List
126.	(14920) 1994 PE_{33}	367.1	0.54	2	Flora	S	3.53	14.43	LCDB · List
127.	(23615) 1996 FK12	367	0.23	2	Hungaria	E	2.92	14.60	LCDB · List
128.	8485 Satoru	362.8	0.58	2	MBA (outer)	C	10.11	13.70	LCDB · List
129.	(114541) 2003 BP_{25}	362.3	0.77	2	MBA (inner)	S	2.54	15.34	LCDB · List
130.	(45752) 2000 JY_{70}	362	0.48	2	Eos	S	6.19	13.79	LCDB · List
131.	(325929) 2010 VB_{17}	360.4	0.68	2	Flora	S	0.65	18.09	LCDB · List
132.	(31399) 1998 YF_{30}	359.1	0.40	2	Eunomia	S	5.63	13.56	LCDB · List
133.	(22056) 2000 AU_{31}	358	0.98	2+	Jupiter trojan	C	24.30	11.80	LCDB · List
134.	(83374) 2001 SF_{9}	356.4	0.48	2	MBA (outer)	C	9.14	13.92	LCDB · List
135.	4024 Ronan	356	1.10	3−	Flora	S	6.51	13.10	LCDB · List
136.	(252461) 2001 TS_{233}	353.9	0.48	2	MBA (outer)	C	2.81	16.49	LCDB · List
137.	10374 Etampes	353	0.23	2	Flora	S	4.09	14.11	LCDB · List
138.	(123104) 2000 SV_{348}	351.9	0.42	2	MBA (middle)	S	3.42	15.44	LCDB · List
139.	630 Euphemia	350	0.45	2	Eunomia	S	17.14	11.10	LCDB · List
140.	(31076) 1996 XH_{1}	350	0.17	2	Hungaria	E	1.93	15.50	LCDB · List
141.	(105654) 2000 SX_{26}	348.7	0.70	2	Jupiter trojan	C	11.67	13.39	LCDB · List
142.	(26083) 1981 EJ_{11}	347	0.34	2+	Nysa	S	2.77	15.10	LCDB · List
143.	(122733) 2000 SK_{47}	346.9	0.26	2	Jupiter trojan	C	14.56	12.91	LCDB · List
144.	(9807) 1997 SJ_{4}	346	0.43	2	Jupiter trojan	C	30.59	11.30	LCDB · List
145.	2487 Juhani	344.6	1.03	2	MBA (inner)	S	7.13	13.10	LCDB · List
146.	(24471) 2000 SH_{313}	344.1	0.75	2	Jupiter trojan	C	27.20	11.56	LCDB · List
147.	(43807) 1991 RC11	337.8	0.18	2	MBA (outer)	C	12.30	13.28	LCDB · List
148.	4962 Vecherka	336	1.08	2	Eunomia	S	10.06	12.30	LCDB · List
149.	7430 Kogure	335.9	0.57	2	MBA (inner)	S	7.82	12.90	LCDB · List
150.	(28857) 2000 JE_{59}	335.5	0.54	2	Eunomia	S	3.37	14.67	LCDB · List
151.	10551 Göteborg	335.3	0.70	2	Eos	S	11.53	12.44	LCDB · List
152.	8942 Takagi	332.2	0.44	2	MBA (outer)	C	6.91	14.53	LCDB · List
153.	(61750) 2000 QD_{157}	331.6	0.84	2	MBA (middle)	S	3.05	15.69	LCDB · List
154.	(51888) 2001 QZ_{17}	331	0.39	2+	Hilda	C	13.98	13.00	LCDB · List
155.	(213835) 2003 QZ_{110}	330.4	0.55	2	Flora	S	0.73	17.84	LCDB · List
156.	12577 Samra	329.2	0.96	2	MBA (outer)	C	5.72	14.94	LCDB · List
157.	(256357) 2006 XH_{57}	325.1	0.74	2	MBA (inner)	S	1.50	16.48	LCDB · List
158.	(31177) 1997 XH11	323.4	0.49	2	Eunomia	S	4.43	14.08	LCDB · List
159.	(332190) 2006 BR_{277}	321.6	0.91	2	MBA (outer)	C	2.31	16.91	LCDB · List
160.	(16917) 1998 FB_{29}	321.5	0.69	2	Koronis	S	4.63	13.84	LCDB · List
161.	3527 McCord	321	0.44	2	Flora	S	7.82	12.70	LCDB · List
162.	(50647) 2000 EN_{88}	320	0.88	2	MBA (outer)	C	8.76	14.02	LCDB · List
163.	341 California	318	0.92	3	Flora	S	14.67	10.55	LCDB · List
164.	16879 Campai	314.2	0.68	2	MBA (outer)	C	10.61	13.60	LCDB · List
165.	14040 Andrejka	310	0.95	2	Flora	S	2.26	15.40	LCDB · List
166.	(26977) 1997 US_{3}	309.7	0.92	2	Eunomia	S	5.44	13.63	LCDB · List
167.	(87892) 2000 SS_{292}	309.7	0.82	2	MBA (outer)	C	7.26	14.42	LCDB · List
168.	(21805) 1999 TQ_{9}	309.3	0.40	2	Themis	C	7.38	14.02	LCDB · List
169.	1807 Slovakia	308.6	1.10	3	MBA (inner)	S	9.84	12.40	LCDB · List
170.	(84631) 2002 VW_{51}	308.1	0.54	2	MBA (inner)	S	2.22	15.63	LCDB · List
171.	8807 Schenk	307.6	0.44	2	MBA (inner)	S	4.17	14.26	LCDB · List
172.	(26876) 1994 CR_{14}	306.7	0.54	2	Eos	S	6.07	13.84	LCDB · List
173.	(326366) 2000 WV_{21}	306.7	0.72	2	MBA (middle)	S	2.06	16.55	LCDB · List
174.	79360 Sila–Nunam	300.2	0.15	2	TNO	C	330.77	5.52	LCDB · List

back to top

== Periods of 200+ hours ==
#	Minor planet designation	Rotation period (hours)	Δmag	Quality (U)	Orbit or family	Spectral type	Diameter (km)	Abs. mag (H)	Refs
175.	21723 Yinyinwu	297.9	0.47	2	MBA (outer)	C	6.81	14.56	LCDB · List
176.	(185492) 2007 HA_{8}	295.4	0.67	2	Jupiter trojan	C	13.60	13.06	LCDB · List
177.	11780 Thunder Bay	295	0.70	3	MBA (inner)	S	7.13	13.10	LCDB · List
178.	(183300) 2002 UH_{19}	294.8	0.64	2	MBA (inner)	S	1.09	17.17	LCDB · List
179.	(239303) 2007 PB_{43}	292.1	0.92	2	MBA (outer)	C	4.03	15.70	LCDB · List
180.	1506 Xosa	292	0.70	2+	MBA (inner)	S	11.83	12.00	LCDB · List
181.	470 Kilia	290	0.26	2	Vestian	S	26.39	10.07	LCDB · List
182.	2018 XV	290	0.28	2	NEO	S	0.24	20.44	LCDB · MPC
183.	(17847) 1998 HQ_{115}	289.8	0.64	2	MBA (middle)	S	5.31	14.49	LCDB · List
184.	(69026) 2002 VL_{93}	288.1	0.63	2	MBA (inner)	S	2.95	15.01	LCDB · List
185.	(128648) 2004 RT_{42}	287.5	0.51	2	MBA (outer)	C	4.35	15.53	LCDB · List
186.	4459 Nusamaibashi	287.5	0.66	2	Flora	S	3.91	14.21	LCDB · List
187.	(14774) 4845 T-1	287.4	0.50	2	MBA (outer)	C	11.05	13.51	LCDB · List
188.	(98081) 2000 RF_{67}	287.3	0.84	2	MBA (inner)	S	3.41	14.70	LCDB · List
189.	(34045) 2000 OD_{34}	287.3	0.23	2	MBA (inner)	S	3.44	14.68	LCDB · List
190.	(163899) 2003 SD220	285	2.20	2+	NEO	S	1.08	17.20	LCDB · List
191.	(225561) 2000 SB_{372}	281.6	0.55	2	MBA (middle)	S	2.00	16.61	LCDB · List
192.	3635 Kreutz	280	0.25	2+	Hungaria	S	3.41	14.70	LCDB · List
193.	(35697) 1999 CG_{104}	277.6	0.92	2	Flora	S	2.85	14.89	LCDB · List
194.	(15658) 1265 T-2	277.4	0.49	2	MBA (inner)	S	2.34	15.52	LCDB · List
195.	(32539) 2001 PD_{59}	276.3	0.67	2	MBA (outer)	C	7.72	14.29	LCDB · List
196.	4142 Dersu-Uzala	276	0.60	2	Hungaria	S	7.13	13.10	LCDB · List
197.	(7183) 1991 RE16	275.8	0.46	2	Eos	S	10.93	12.56	LCDB · List
198.	(16843) 1997 XX_{3}	275	0.41	2	Hilda	C	21.16	12.10	LCDB · List
199.	(67175) 2000 BA_{19}	275	0.25	2+	Hungaria	E	2.54	14.90	LCDB · List
200.	(16819) 1997 VW	274.9	0.50	2	MBA (middle)	S	9.09	13.32	LCDB · List
201.	10404 McCall	274.9	0.84	2	MBA (outer)	C	7.05	14.49	LCDB · List
202.	2870 Haupt	274	0.60	3−	Erigone	C	14.64	12.90	LCDB · List
203.	2554 Skiff	273	0.90	2	Flora	S	7.82	12.70	LCDB · List
204.	299 Thora	272.9	0.50	3−	MBA (inner)	S	17.11	11.30	LCDB · List
205.	20796 Philipmunoz	272.8	0.46	2	Koronis	S	3.36	14.53	LCDB · List
206.	3945 Gerasimenko	272.3	0.68	2	MBA (outer)	C	14.80	12.88	LCDB · List
207.	2576 Yesenin	272	0.34	2	MBA (outer)	C	25.86	11.66	LCDB · List
208.	(24466) 2000 SC_{156}	271.9	0.63	2	MBA (outer)	C	9.15	13.92	LCDB · List
209.	9323 Hirohisasato	269.2	0.53	2	Erigone	C	5.23	15.14	LCDB · List
210.	(42195) 2001 DO_{17}	268.8	0.92	2	MBA (outer)	C	12.11	13.31	LCDB · List
211.	(332019) 2005 NP_{122}	268.6	0.41	2	Hilda	C	4.95	15.26	LCDB · List
212.	10476 Los Molinos	267.9	0.33	2	MBA (inner)	S	2.96	15.01	LCDB · List
213.	(24357) 2000 AC_{115}	264	0.39	2+	Jupiter trojan	C	25.44	11.70	LCDB · List
214.	2010 WG9	263.8	0.14	2	TNO	C	91.94	8.30	LCDB · MPC
215.	(28552) 2000 EY_{38}	263.2	0.30	2	MBA (middle)	S	5.54	14.40	LCDB · List
216.	(12808) 1996 AF_{1}	263.1	0.30	2	MBA (inner)	S	6.21	13.40	LCDB · List
217.	(147560) 2004 FN_{25}	261.9	0.86	2	Eunomia	S	1.71	16.15	LCDB · List
218.	(149106) 2002 CD_{206}	261.2	0.87	2	MBA (outer)	C	3.78	15.84	LCDB · List
219.	(65223) 2002 EU_{34}	260	0.44	2+	Jupiter trojan	C	18.43	12.40	LCDB · List
220.	(183581) 2003 SY_{84}	260	0.87	2	Mars crosser	S	2.97	15.00	LCDB · List
221.	(29231) 1992 EG_{4}	259.5	0.85	2	MBA (outer)	C	6.11	14.80	LCDB · List
222.	(226828) 2004 RR_{321}	259.2	0.90	2	MBA (outer)	C	3.76	15.85	LCDB · List
223.	1447 Utra	257	0.63	2	MBA (inner)	S	13.58	11.70	LCDB · List
224.	(161738) 2006 SD_{126}	256.4	0.61	2	MBA (inner)	S	1.96	15.90	LCDB · List
225.	1573 Väisälä	252	0.76	2	Phocaea	S	9.77	12.30	LCDB · List
226.	(119745) 2001 YU_{44}	251.3	0.30	2	MBA (inner)	S	2.44	15.43	LCDB · List
227.	(51238) 2000 JT_{34}	250.6	0.42	2	MBA (outer)	C	9.59	13.82	LCDB · List
228.	6169 Sashakrot	250.1	0.39	2	MBA (outer)	C	12.22	13.29	LCDB · List
229.	824 Anastasia	250	1.20	3−	MBA (outer)	S	34.14	10.41	LCDB · List
230.	6271 Farmer	250	0.22	2	Hungaria	E	4.62	13.60	LCDB · List
231.	(24107) 1999 VS_{19}	249	0.31	2	MBA (outer)	C	9.37	13.87	LCDB · List
232.	7509 Gamzatov	249	0.75	3−	Flora	S	5.17	13.60	LCDB · List
233.	(39705) 1996 TO_{18}	247.2	0.39	2	Flora	S	2.14	15.52	LCDB · List
234.	(128906) 2004 TR_{34}	247	0.58	2	Themis	C	3.33	15.75	LCDB · List
235.	(258476) 2002 AN_{13}	247	0.75	2	MBA (outer)	C	2.10	17.12	LCDB · List
236.	19034 Santorini	247	0.43	2	Hilda	C	14.64	12.90	LCDB · List
237.	(41039) 1999 UX_{56}	246.8	0.82	2	MBA (outer)	C	4.36	15.53	LCDB · List
238.	(13854) 1999 XX_{104}	246.7	0.79	2	MBA (inner)	S	2.19	15.66	LCDB · List
239.	(144974) 2005 EH_{125}	246.7	0.73	2	Flora	S	0.91	17.38	LCDB · List
240.	(83958) 2001 XA_{36}	246.1	0.87	2	MBA (outer)	C	5.03	15.22	LCDB · List
241.	10019 Wesleyfraser	245.1	0.43	2	Themis	C	6.65	14.25	LCDB · List
242.	(225930) 2002 AL_{161}	241.8	0.45	2	MBA (inner)	S	1.26	16.86	LCDB · List
243.	76272 De Jong	241.4	0.83	2	MBA (outer)	C	5.65	14.97	LCDB · List
244.	(17127) 1999 JE_{69}	240.7	0.85	2	Eunomia	S	4.35	14.12	LCDB · List
245.	10415 Mali Lošinj	240.5	0.48	2	MBA (outer)	C	18.77	12.36	LCDB · List
246.	(45672) 2000 EE_{109}	240.3	0.59	2	MBA (outer)	C	8.70	14.03	LCDB · List
247.	821 Fanny	236.6	0.28	3−	MBA (outer)	C	23.86	11.84	LCDB · List
248.	2772 Dugan	235	1.14	2+	MBA (inner)	B	4.34	14.18	LCDB · List
249.	(115453) 2003 TL_{11}	234.6	0.63	2	MBA (outer)	C	5.08	15.20	LCDB · List
250.	(369984) 1998 QR_{52}	234	0.88	3	NEO	S	0.46	19.07	LCDB · List
251.	3033 Holbaek	233.3	1.20	3−	Flora	S	7.82	12.70	LCDB · List
252.	(198582) 2004 YT_{13}	233.1	0.95	2	MBA (outer)	C	3.65	15.92	LCDB · List
253.	5048 Moriarty	232.9	0.69	2	MBA (middle)	S	8.12	13.57	LCDB · List
254.	8449 Maslovets	230.7	0.65	2	MBA (outer)	C	14.64	12.90	LCDB · List
255.	(48707) 1996 KR1	230	0.75	3−	Hungaria	E	2.02	15.40	LCDB · List
256.	(95355) 2002 CQ_{141}	229.9	0.27	2	MBA (outer)	C	5.33	15.10	LCDB · List
257.	(131381) 2001 KU_{39}	227.4	0.77	2	MBA (outer)	C	6.98	14.51	LCDB · List
258.	(114439) 2003 AL_{13}	227	0.85	2	MBA (inner)	S	1.82	16.06	LCDB · List
259.	3691 Bede	226.8	0.50	2	NEO	X	1.83	15.22	LCDB · List
260.	9969 Braille	226.4	0.90	2	Mars crosser	Q	1.64	16.40	LCDB · List
261.	(157900) 1999 TW_{108}	225.5	0.68	2	MBA (outer)	C	3.63	15.93	LCDB · List
262.	(78237) 2002 OL_{20}	223.7	0.61	2	Eos	S	2.76	15.55	LCDB · List
263.	(39796) 1997 TD	223.5	0.92	2	NEO	S	2.15	15.70	LCDB · List
264.	(18899) 2000 JQ_{2}	222	0.13	2+	Mars crosser	S	3.26	14.80	LCDB · List
265.	(442742) 2012 WP_{3}	221	0.30	2+	NEO	S	0.90	17.60	LCDB · List
266.	(49642) 1999 JK_{26}	220	0.67	2	MBA (outer)	C	8.04	14.20	LCDB · List
267.	65637 Tsniimash	220	0.90	3	Hungaria	E	3.35	14.30	LCDB · List
268.	(40501) 1999 RM_{82}	217.9	0.59	2	MBA (outer)	C	4.66	15.39	LCDB · List
269.	(16353) 1974 WB	216.6	0.43	2	Eunomia	S	2.93	14.98	LCDB · List
270.	18699 Quigley	216.5	0.93	2	MBA (outer)	C	5.87	14.88	LCDB · List
271.	(38071) 1999 GU_{3}	216	1.50	3	NEO	S	0.36	19.60	LCDB · List
272.	(114556) 2003 BR_{50}	213.9	0.60	2	Eunomia	S	2.14	15.66	LCDB · List
273.	10001 Palermo	213.4	0.97	2	Vestian	S	4.31	14.19	LCDB · List
274.	(8394) 1993 TM12	212.8	0.53	2	Flora	S	3.16	14.67	LCDB · List
275.	20394 Fatou	212.5	0.62	2	MBA (outer)	C	8.25	14.15	LCDB · List
276.	1183 Jutta	212.5	0.10	2	MBA (inner)	S	17.83	12.40	LCDB · List
277.	(33736) 1999 NY_{36}	211	0.40	2	MBA (outer)	C	10.13	13.70	LCDB · List
278.	1839 Ragazza	210.9	0.99	2+	MBA (outer)	C	22.16	12.00	LCDB · List
279.	1244 Deira	210.6	0.50	2	MBA (inner)	S	30.89	11.50	LCDB · List
280.	(28876) 2000 KL_{31}	210.6	0.41	2	MBA (outer)	C	10.06	13.72	LCDB · List
281.	(28497) 2000 CJ_{69}	210.4	0.87	2	MBA (inner)	S	1.77	16.13	LCDB · List
282.	(109587) 2001 QJ_{277}	208.4	0.54	2	Eos	S	3.90	14.80	LCDB · List
283.	(7181) 1991 PH12	206.7	0.50	2	MBA (outer)	C	14.16	12.97	LCDB · List
284.	(86666) 2000 FL_{10}	206	0.85	2	NEO	S	1.24	16.90	LCDB · List
285.	2014 PL_{51}	205	0.43	2	NEO	S	0.25	20.40	LCDB · MPC
286.	(108892) 2001 PM_{2}	204.8	0.86	2	MBA (outer)	C	5.19	15.15	LCDB · List
287.	(91851) 1999 UA_{8}	204.2	0.87	2	MBA (outer)	C	5.20	15.15	LCDB · List
288.	(220239) 2002 XG_{15}	204.1	0.28	2	MBA (outer)	C	3.91	15.77	LCDB · List
289.	(33341) 1998 WA_{5}	204	0.57	3−	Hungaria	E	2.43	15.00	LCDB · List
290.	(21206) 1994 PT_{28}	203.8	0.85	2	MBA (outer)	C	5.88	14.88	LCDB · List
291.	(20900) 2000 XW_{4}	203.8	0.21	2	MBA (outer)	C	9.66	13.80	LCDB · List
292.	(158553) 2002 JS_{1}	203.6	0.73	2	MBA (outer)	C	3.77	15.84	LCDB · List
293.	(9559) 1987 DH6	203.3	0.63	2	MBA (middle)	S	9.19	13.30	LCDB · List
294.	(175809) 1999 RU_{182}	202.1	0.82	2	Flora	S	0.97	17.25	LCDB · List
295.	9340 Williamholden	202.1	0.86	2	Themis	C	8.91	13.61	LCDB · List
296.	408 Fama	202.1	0.58	3	MBA (outer)	C	41.09	9.30	LCDB · List
297.	950 Ahrensa	202	0.40	3	Phocaea	S	15.27	11.20	LCDB · List
298.	3353 Jarvis	202	0.50	2+	Hungaria	C	9.70	13.70	LCDB · List
299.	(197309) 2003 WS_{140}	200.7	0.41	2	MBA (outer)	C	3.77	15.84	LCDB · List
300.	(65407) 2002 RP120	200	0.60	2	Comet-like orbit	C	14.60	12.30	LCDB · List
301.	703 Noëmi	200	0.78	2	Flora	S	8.58	12.50	LCDB · List
302.	2750 Loviisa	200	0.80	2	Flora	S	6.21	13.20	LCDB · List
303.	2001 EC_{16}	200	–	2	NEO	S	0.15	22.30	LCDB · MPC

back to top

== Periods of 100+ hours ==
#	Minor planet designation	Rotation period (hours)	Δmag	Quality (U)	Orbit or family	Spectral type	Diameter (km)	Abs. mag (H)	Refs
304.	(138691) 2000 SP_{57}	199.1	0.49	2	MBA (outer)	C	6.39	14.70	LCDB · List
305.	3833 Calingasta	199	1.20	3	Mars crosser	C	2.59	15.30	LCDB · List
306.	(332841) 2010 EA_{6}	198.7	0.74	2	MBA (outer)	C	2.62	16.64	LCDB · List
307.	(91599) 1999 TQ_{13}	198.3	0.61	2	MBA (outer)	C	5.21	15.14	LCDB · List
308.	6734 Benzenberg	196.7	0.41	2	Eos	S	15.51	11.80	LCDB · List
309.	(5747) 1991 CO3	196.5	0.71	2+	Phocaea	S	8.13	12.50	LCDB · List
310.	(104182) 2000 EB_{96}	195.8	0.71	2	Vestian	S	1.61	16.33	LCDB · List
311.	(38701) 2000 QB_{66}	195.1	0.48	2	Hilda	C	18.12	12.44	LCDB · List
312.	(39596) 1993 QZ_{8}	195.1	0.38	2	Flora	S	1.57	16.19	LCDB · List
313.	(374702) 2006 RJ_{62}	194.9	0.95	2	MBA (inner)	S	0.58	18.57	LCDB · List
314.	9054 Hippocastanum	193.6	0.38	2	Eunomia	S	5.33	13.68	LCDB · List
315.	(41443) 2000 JD_{73}	193.1	0.59	2	MBA (inner)	S	2.85	15.09	LCDB · List
316.	(124032) 2001 FN_{126}	192.3	0.85	2	MBA (outer)	C	5.15	15.17	LCDB · List
317.	(229567) 2006 AR_{33}	192.2	0.63	2	MBA (middle)	S	2.11	16.49	LCDB · List
318.	3064 Zimmer	190.5	0.70	2	Nysa	S	4.74	13.93	LCDB · List
319.	(109204) 2001 QE_{81}	190.1	0.71	2	MBA (outer)	C	5.83	14.90	LCDB · List
320.	(29890) 1999 GH_{37}	189.6	0.59	2	MBA (outer)	C	9.63	13.81	LCDB · List
321.	(13144) 1995 BJ	189	0.81	2	MBA (outer)	C	7.70	13.40	LCDB · List
322.	(92287) 2000 EX_{14}	188.9	0.40	2	Hilda	C	9.29	13.89	LCDB · List
323.	(37106) 2000 UC_{101}	188.5	0.69	2	Flora	S	2.48	15.19	LCDB · List
324.	(20100) 1994 XM	188.4	0.83	2	Themis	C	5.54	14.64	LCDB · List
325.	(69653) 1998 FT_{101}	188	0.32	2	Flora	S	2.41	15.26	LCDB · List
326.	1278 Kenya	188	0.75	3	MBA (inner)	S	20.56	10.80	LCDB · List
327.	(144881) 2004 RM_{99}	187.6	0.67	2	MBA (outer)	C	4.22	15.60	LCDB · List
328.	28680 Sandralitvin	187.4	0.56	2	MBA (inner)	S	2.21	15.65	LCDB · List
329.	(183460) 2003 BT_{52}	187.1	0.48	2	MBA (outer)	C	3.71	15.88	LCDB · List
330.	3345 Tarkovskij	187	0.70	3−	MBA (inner)	C	24.15	12.00	LCDB · List
331.	(152434) 2005 UV_{438}	187	0.40	2	MBA (outer)	C	4.55	15.44	LCDB · List
332.	(69420) 1995 YA_{1}	186.9	0.70	2	MBA (inner)	S	2.45	15.42	LCDB · List
333.	(18892) 2000 ET_{137}	186.8	0.70	2	Eunomia	S	4.26	14.16	LCDB · List
334.	(11737) 1998 QL_{24}	184.7	0.25	2	MBA (inner)	S	4.27	14.22	LCDB · List
335.	20371 Ekladyous	184.4	0.54	2	MBA (outer)	C	5.99	14.84	LCDB · List
336.	(20050) 1993 FO_{21}	184.3	0.20	2	MBA (outer)	C	5.31	15.10	LCDB · List
337.	(153144) 2000 SY_{230}	183.8	0.66	2	MBA (middle)	S	2.09	16.51	LCDB · List
338.	(266312) 2007 CY_{37}	183.5	0.53	2	Eunomia	S	1.57	16.33	LCDB · List
339.	(247388) 2001 YA_{122}	183.5	0.62	2	MBA (outer)	C	3.61	15.94	LCDB · List
340.	9900 Llull	183.3	0.88	2	MBA (inner)	S	4.30	14.20	LCDB · List
341.	(375904) 2009 VJ_{105}	183.2	0.73	2	MBA (inner)	S	1.28	16.84	LCDB · List
342.	5202 Charleseliot	183	0.58	2	MBA (inner)	S	9.53	13.37	LCDB · List
343.	(13384) 1998 XG_{79}	182.2	0.82	2	MBA (outer)	C	14.80	12.88	LCDB · List
344.	(190208) 2006 AQ	182	0.25	3−	NEO	S	0.71	18.10	LCDB · List
345.	(26198) 1997 GJ_{13}	181.1	0.39	2	MBA (inner)	S	2.36	15.50	LCDB · List
346.	(208173) 2000 QM_{24}	180.6	0.82	2	MBA (outer)	C	5.83	14.90	LCDB · List
347.	(225534) 2000 SX_{25}	180.4	0.64	2	Eunomia	S	1.51	16.42	LCDB · List
348.	(76786) 2000 LT_{9}	180.1	0.78	2	Themis	C	7.11	14.10	LCDB · List
349.	(253106) 2002 UR_{3}	180	0.36	2	NEO	S	1.42	16.60	LCDB · List
350.	(28294) 1999 CS_{59}	179.8	0.56	2	MBA (outer)	C	8.94	13.97	LCDB · List
351.	16064 Davidharvey	178.5	0.70	2	NEO	C	4.10	16.56	LCDB · List
352.	(47330) 1999 XQ_{31}	178.1	0.80	2	MBA (outer)	C	6.83	14.56	LCDB · List
353.	4181 Kivi	178	0.77	2	Eunomia	S	9.17	12.50	LCDB · List
354.	641 Agnes	178	0.55	3	Flora	S	8.81	12.64	LCDB · List
355.	(20231) 1997 YK	178	0.70	2	Hungaria	E	3.85	14.00	LCDB · List
356.	(186865) 2004 HO_{24}	177.8	0.54	2	MBA (middle)	S	2.58	16.06	LCDB · List
357.	(277373) 2005 UD_{20}	177.6	0.95	2	MBA (outer)	C	3.42	16.06	LCDB · List
358.	(22712) 1998 RF_{78}	177.1	0.58	2	MBA (outer)	C	10.00	13.73	LCDB · List
359.	6236 Mallard	176.3	0.83	2	Themis	C	8.36	13.75	LCDB · List
360.	4179 Toutatis	176	1.46	3	NEO	S	2.45	15.30	LCDB · List
361.	4002 Shinagawa	175	0.95	3−	MBA (inner)	S	13.58	11.70	LCDB · List
362.	(45109) 1999 XZ_{76}	174.9	0.60	2	MBA (outer)	C	7.97	14.22	LCDB · List
363.	23061 Blueglass	174.6	0.51	2	Themis	C	5.87	14.52	LCDB · List
364.	16421 Roadrunner	174	1.25	3	Hungaria	E	3.20	14.40	LCDB · List
365.	(12424) 1995 VM	173.8	1.05	2	Eunomia	S	5.64	13.56	LCDB · List
366.	3123 Dunham	172.5	0.73	2	Nysa	S	5.68	13.54	LCDB · List
367.	(30591) 2001 QG_{10}	172.4	0.83	2	MBA (middle)	S	4.24	14.98	LCDB · List
368.	3679 Condruses	172	1.30	2+	Flora	S	5.41	13.50	LCDB · List
369.	(348519) 2005 UK_{53}	171.5	0.67	2	MBA (outer)	C	3.08	16.28	LCDB · List
370.	(130809) 2000 UJ_{5}	170.9	0.71	2	MBA (inner)	S	1.43	16.59	LCDB · List
371.	(39036) 2000 UQ_{78}	170.4	0.81	2	Flora	S	1.61	16.14	LCDB · List
372.	9074 Yosukeyoshida	170	1.03	2	Erigone	C	6.76	14.58	LCDB · List
373.	15861 Ispahan	169.5	0.33	2	MBA (outer)	C	14.34	12.94	LCDB · List
374.	(38999) 2000 UV_{26}	169.1	0.75	2	Eunomia	S	4.16	14.22	LCDB · List
375.	(248098) 2004 RG_{85}	167.8	0.61	2	MBA (outer)	C	4.28	15.57	LCDB · List
376.	1606 Jekhovsky	165.9	0.31	2	MBA (middle)	C	15.47	12.17	LCDB · List
377.	(274026) 2007 RT_{29}	164.4	0.51	2	MBA (outer)	C	3.92	15.76	LCDB · List
378.	460 Scania	164.1	0.37	3	MBA (outer)	S	21.63	10.80	LCDB · List
379.	(50554) 2000 EC_{24}	161.9	0.60	2	MBA (outer)	C	5.61	14.99	LCDB · List
380.	(16240) 2000 GJ_{115}	161.4	0.74	2	MBA (outer)	C	10.11	13.70	LCDB · List
381.	(43162) 1999 XE_{126}	161	0.64	2	MBA (outer)	C	5.66	14.96	LCDB · List
382.	(154807) 2004 PP_{97}	161	0.96	2	NEO	S	0.57	18.60	LCDB · List
383.	(198605) 2005 AM_{19}	160.8	0.38	2	MBA (outer)	C	3.15	16.24	LCDB · List
384.	655 Briseïs	160.7	0.40	3	MBA (outer)	C	30.28	10.00	LCDB · List
385.	(40237) 1998 VM6	160.3	0.22	2	Jupiter trojan	C	19.06	12.33	LCDB · List
386.	7038 Tokorozawa	160	0.60	2	Themis	C	10.82	13.19	LCDB · List
387.	5577 Priestley	160	0.85	3−	Hungaria	S	4.30	14.20	LCDB · List
388.	2735 Ellen	159	1.50	3−	Hungaria	SDU::	3.32	14.32	LCDB · List
389.	1193 Africa	158.7	0.80	2+	Eunomia	S	12.66	11.80	LCDB · List
390.	(50176) 2000 AH_{163}	158.6	0.61	2	MBA (outer)	C	7.89	14.24	LCDB · List
391.	(104505) 2000 GR_{39}	158.5	0.63	2	Eunomia	S	2.91	14.99	LCDB · List
392.	(83218) 2001 RP_{27}	158	0.80	2	MBA (outer)	C	7.01	14.50	LCDB · List
393.	(75903) 2000 CQ_{49}	157.9	0.76	2	MBA (middle)	S	3.32	15.51	LCDB · List
394.	(5733) 1989 AQ	157.8	0.66	2	Themis	C	11.21	13.11	LCDB · List
395.	(89633) 2001 XM_{210}	157.3	0.23	2	MBA (inner)	S	1.91	15.97	LCDB · List
396.	(193313) 2000 SR_{308}	157	0.52	2	MBA (middle)	S	1.77	16.88	LCDB · List
397.	2843 Yeti	156.7	0.45	2	Flora	S	5.82	13.34	LCDB · List
398.	(67578) 2000 SO_{112}	156.6	0.89	2	Flora	S	1.16	16.85	LCDB · List
399.	(51777) 2001 MG_{8}	155.9	0.79	2	MBA (outer)	C	10.13	13.70	LCDB · List
400.	(32534) 2001 PL_{37}	155.5	0.45	2	MBA (outer)	C	11.87	13.36	LCDB · List
401.	2018 RL	155	1.00	2+	NEO	S	0.33	19.80	LCDB · MPC
402.	(270325) 2001 XC_{104}	154.4	0.89	2	MBA (inner)	S	1.03	17.30	LCDB · List
403.	134340 Pluto	153.3	0.30	3	TNO	(neutral)	2339.00	-0.76	LCDB · List
404.	6805 Abstracta	152.2	0.78	2	Themis	C	8.41	13.74	LCDB · List
405.	(76229) 2000 EK_{75}	151.9	0.70	2	Eunomia	S	3.28	14.73	LCDB · List
406.	(222679) 2001 YY_{54}	151.9	0.57	2	MBA (inner)	S	1.71	16.19	LCDB · List
407.	763 Cupido	151.5	0.45	3−	Flora	S	8.97	12.60	LCDB · List
408.	(134553) 1999 RK_{165}	151.4	0.45	2	MBA (inner)	S	1.06	17.23	LCDB · List
409.	(163732) 2003 KP_{2}	151.1	1.70	3	NEO	S	2.47	15.40	LCDB · List
410.	2705 Wu	150.5	1.20	3−	Flora	S	6.21	13.20	LCDB · List
411.	(86206) 1999 TK_{9}	150.1	0.41	2	MBA (outer)	C	6.61	14.63	LCDB · List
412.	(99812) 2002 LW_{31}	150	0.80	2	MBA (outer)	C	8.05	14.20	LCDB · List
413.	14815 Rutberg	150	1.00	2	MBA (inner)	S	4.10	14.30	LCDB · List
414.	3102 Krok	149.4	1.60	3	NEO	QRS	1.48	16.52	LCDB · List
415.	(15312) 1993 FH_{27}	149.4	0.46	2	MBA (outer)	C	6.13	14.79	LCDB · List
416.	1909 Alekhin	148.6	0.45	3	MBA (inner)	S	17.33	12.80	LCDB · List
417.	(86128) 1999 RC_{154}	147.7	0.89	2	Eos	S	5.08	14.22	LCDB · List
418.	(180962) 2005 MW_{35}	147.4	0.43	2	MBA (inner)	S	1.30	16.80	LCDB · List
419.	(110119) 2001 SP_{138}	147.4	0.48	2	MBA (inner)	S	2.15	15.70	LCDB · List
420.	(43052) 1999 VJ_{71}	146.9	0.53	2	Flora	S	1.31	16.57	LCDB · List
421.	(7743) 1986 JA	146.8	0.93	3−	MBA (inner)	S	5.93	13.50	LCDB · List
422.	(19485) 1998 HC_{122}	146.5	0.37	2	MBA (outer)	C	12.54	13.24	LCDB · List
423.	(123184) 2000 UQ_{6}	146.4	0.66	2	MBA (middle)	S	3.03	15.71	LCDB · List
424.	(143719) 2003 UU_{177}	146.3	0.56	2	MBA (outer)	C	3.51	16.00	LCDB · List
425.	823 Sisigambis	146	0.70	2	Flora	S	15.74	11.37	LCDB · List
426.	15806 Kohei	145.7	0.29	2	Eos	S	8.64	13.07	LCDB · List
427.	(7138) 1994 AK15	145.3	0.26	2	MBA (inner)	S	5.05	13.85	LCDB · List
428.	(25535) 1999 XF_{144}	145.2	0.88	2	Eunomia	S	5.07	13.79	LCDB · List
429.	1689 Floris-Jan	145	0.40	3	MBA (inner)	S	16.21	11.74	LCDB · List
430.	(195957) 2002 RJ_{165}	145	0.31	2	MBA (outer)	C	4.06	15.68	LCDB · List
431.	(87580) 2000 RE_{16}	144.9	0.45	2	MBA (middle)	S	3.78	15.23	LCDB · List
432.	4158 Santini	144.4	0.37	2	MBA (outer)	C	26.64	11.60	LCDB · List
433.	(109978) 2001 ST_{54}	144	0.30	2	MBA (outer)	C	7.01	14.50	LCDB · List
434.	(52786) 1998 QP_{42}	144	0.50	2	Flora	S	1.79	15.90	LCDB · List
435.	1137 Raïssa	142.8	0.56	3−	MBA (inner)	S	23.66	10.78	LCDB · List
436.	(248503) 2005 UN_{480}	142.7	0.90	2	MBA (outer)	C	3.62	15.93	LCDB · List
437.	(285032) 2011 EX_{26}	140.9	0.55	2	MBA (outer)	C	2.89	16.42	LCDB · List
438.	(162921) 2001 OL_{11}	140.1	0.34	2	MBA (outer)	C	4.21	15.61	LCDB · List
439.	(39618) 1994 LT	140	0.85	2	Hungaria	E	2.02	15.40	LCDB · List
440.	2423 Ibarruri	139.8	0.74	3	Mars crosser	C	6.50	13.30	LCDB · List
441.	(51010) 2000 GN_{103}	139.2	0.39	2	Nysa	S	1.75	16.10	LCDB · List
442.	1473 Ounas	139.1	0.60	3	MBA (inner)	S	17.62	11.70	LCDB · List
443.	38454 Boroson	138.8	0.85	2	Eunomia	S	5.18	13.74	LCDB · List
444.	(201746) 2003 UN_{276}	138.8	0.83	2	MBA (outer)	C	3.81	15.83	LCDB · List
445.	(66775) 1999 TS_{220}	138.3	0.49	2	MBA (outer)	C	5.52	15.02	LCDB · List
446.	(144564) 2004 FE_{13}	138.1	0.87	2	Flora	S	1.75	15.96	LCDB · List
447.	(17149) 1999 JM_{105}	138.1	0.50	2	MBA (outer)	C	7.81	14.26	LCDB · List
448.	1451 Granö	138	0.65	2+	Flora	S	7.13	13.10	LCDB · List
449.	1329 Eliane	137.8	0.43	2	MBA (middle)	S	19.63	10.90	LCDB · List
450.	(16592) 1992 TM1	137.7	0.19	2	Eunomia	S	10.10	12.29	LCDB · List
451.	2792 Ponomarev	137.6	0.44	2	MBA (inner)	S	5.98	13.48	LCDB · List
452.	17645 Inarimori	137.4	0.69	2	MBA (outer)	C	12.33	13.27	LCDB · List
453.	(64963) 2001 YP_{144}	137.2	0.65	2	Vestian	S	2.06	15.80	LCDB · List
454.	(53337) 1999 JX_{42}	137.1	0.41	2	MBA (outer)	C	5.75	14.93	LCDB · List
455.	(17689) 1997 CS	137.1	0.46	2	Eos	S	8.33	13.15	LCDB · List
456.	(137065) 1998 WH_{6}	136.9	0.80	2	MBA (inner)	S	1.48	16.51	LCDB · List
457.	(20875) 2000 VU_{49}	136.7	0.65	2	MBA (outer)	C	7.32	14.41	LCDB · List
458.	(25505) 1999 XQ_{95}	136.6	0.31	2	MBA (inner)	S	5.17	13.80	LCDB · List
459.	1954 Kukarkin	136.4	0.80	3−	MBA (outer)	C	30.59	11.30	LCDB · List
460.	(38990) 2000 UZ_{17}	136.2	0.70	2	MBA (outer)	C	3.67	15.91	LCDB · List
461.	(53319) 1999 JM8	136	0.70	2	NEO	X	7.00	15.20	LCDB · List
462.	(14452) 1992 WB9	135.8	0.59	2	MBA (outer)	C	8.88	13.99	LCDB · List
463.	(22100) 2000 GV_{93}	135.7	0.27	2	MBA (outer)	C	9.54	13.83	LCDB · List
464.	16231 Jessberger	135.7	0.87	2	Themis	C	5.98	14.48	LCDB · List
465.	8457 Billgolisch	135.7	0.19	2	MBA (middle)	S	6.42	14.08	LCDB · List
466.	(20562) 1999 RV_{120}	135.4	0.43	2+	MBA (inner)	S	5.66	13.60	LCDB · List
467.	(301945) 2000 BC_{15}	135.3	0.44	2	Eunomia	S	1.41	16.56	LCDB · List
468.	(15659) 2141 T-2	135.2	0.47	2	MBA (outer)	C	7.96	14.22	LCDB · List
469.	(316249) 2010 OL_{55}	135	0.47	2	MBA (outer)	C	3.07	16.29	LCDB · List
470.	(443103) 2013 WT_{67}	135	1.10	2	NEO	S	0.75	18.00	LCDB · List
471.	(161101) 2002 PL_{154}	134.6	0.61	2	MBA (outer)	C	3.68	15.90	LCDB · List
472.	(275300) 2010 OH_{118}	134.5	0.80	2	MBA (outer)	C	3.85	15.80	LCDB · List
473.	(109244) 2001 QZ_{98}	134.4	0.36	2	MBA (inner)	S	1.86	16.02	LCDB · List
474.	(114334) 2002 XW_{65}	134.4	0.54	2	MBA (inner)	S	3.96	14.37	LCDB · List
475.	(51801) 2001 NZ_{2}	133.9	0.18	2	MBA (outer)	C	8.20	14.16	LCDB · List
476.	(5626) 1991 FE	133.6	0.44	2	NEO	S	4.30	14.20	LCDB · List
477.	(23478) 1991 BZ	133.4	0.36	2	MBA (outer)	C	8.46	14.09	LCDB · List
478.	(110586) 2001 TN_{122}	133.2	0.67	2	MBA (outer)	C	4.66	15.39	LCDB · List
479.	2546 Libitina	132.7	0.35	2+	MBA (middle)	S	18.34	11.80	LCDB · List
480.	(23501) 1992 CK_{1}	132.7	0.82	2	MBA (outer)	C	8.82	14.00	LCDB · List
481.	1512 Oulu	132.3	0.33	2+	Hilda	P	82.72	9.62	LCDB · List
482.	120347 Salacia	131.9	0.09	3	TNO	(neutral)	838.00	4.48	LCDB · List
483.	(157312) 2004 SU_{32}	131.7	0.52	2	MBA (outer)	C	3.22	16.19	LCDB · List
484.	7898 Ohkuma	131.3	0.60	2	Flora	S	4.18	14.06	LCDB · List
485.	1989 Tatry	131.3	0.50	2	Vestian	C	17.60	12.50	LCDB · List
486.	2874 Jim Young	131.3	0.75	2	Flora	S	7.13	12.90	LCDB · List
487.	(93894) 2000 WM_{141}	131.3	0.40	2	MBA (inner)	S	4.12	14.29	LCDB · List
488.	(143035) 2002 VS_{121}	131.2	0.76	2	Eunomia	S	2.23	15.57	LCDB · List
489.	5672 Libby	131.1	0.66	2	MBA (inner)	S	6.03	13.46	LCDB · List
490.	(111074) 2001 VW_{51}	130.9	0.77	2	MBA (outer)	C	3.20	16.20	LCDB · List
491.	(152863) 1999 XZ_{114}	130.4	0.50	2	MBA (outer)	C	4.52	15.45	LCDB · List
492.	9228 Nakahiroshi	130.3	0.25	2	MBA (outer)	C	17.82	12.47	LCDB · List
493.	(143116) 2002 XT_{27}	130.1	0.32	2	Eunomia	S	2.05	15.76	LCDB · List
494.	2000 Herschel	130	1.16	2	MBA (inner)	S	16.71	11.25	LCDB · List
495.	3839 Bogaevskij	129.9	0.44	2	Nysa	S	5.79	13.50	LCDB · List
496.	5807 Mshatka	129.8	0.63	2	MBA (outer)	C	13.98	13.00	LCDB · List
497.	244 Sita	129.5	0.82	3−	Flora	S	11.08	11.90	LCDB · List
498.	(267729) 2003 FC_{5}	129.5	0.50	2	NEO	S	0.56	18.61	LCDB · List
499.	(62853) 2000 UO_{76}	129.3	0.88	2	MBA (outer)	C	5.61	14.98	LCDB · List
500.	22812 Ricker	129.2	0.58	2	Nysa	S	1.79	16.05	LCDB · List
501.	(89182) 2001 UQ_{68}	128.8	0.84	2	MBA (outer)	C	6.80	14.56	LCDB · List
502.	(15274) 1991 GO_{6}	128.6	0.30	2	Eunomia	S	3.88	14.37	LCDB · List
503.	(31091) 1997 BE_{9}	128.4	0.77	2	Hungaria	E	1.41	16.18	LCDB · List
504.	(135421) 2001 UC_{49}	128.3	0.61	2	MBA (outer)	C	4.86	15.29	LCDB · List
505.	(13468) 3378 T-3	128.1	0.55	2	MBA (inner)	S	2.40	15.47	LCDB · List
506.	(62340) 2000 SO_{130}	128	0.62	2	MBA (outer)	C	5.44	15.05	LCDB · List
507.	2430 Bruce Helin	128	0.67	2	Phocaea	S	11.55	11.90	LCDB · List
508.	16589 Hastrup	128	0.62	2	Hungaria	E	2.19	14.96	LCDB · List
509.	(136940) 1998 QG_{45}	127.5	0.51	2	MBA (inner)	S	1.57	16.39	LCDB · List
510.	25512 Anncomins	127.1	0.26	2	Flora	S	2.26	15.40	LCDB · List
511.	(170914) 2004 XN_{122}	126.8	0.61	2	MBA (inner)	S	1.15	17.05	LCDB · List
512.	(60310) 1999 XD_{215}	126.6	0.62	2	Eunomia	S	2.57	15.26	LCDB · List
513.	4327 Ries	126.6	0.85	2	MBA (outer)	C	20.97	12.12	LCDB · List
514.	(14451) 1992 WR5	126.6	0.38	2	MBA (outer)	C	15.07	12.84	LCDB · List
515.	(124620) 2001 SS_{50}	126.5	0.39	2	Erigone	C	2.92	16.40	LCDB · List
516.	(128693) 2004 RZ_{92}	126.4	0.93	2	MBA (outer)	C	4.10	15.66	LCDB · List
517.	(242864) 2006 GJ_{50}	126.3	1.18	2	MBA (middle)	SC	2.21	16.40	LCDB · List
518.	571 Dulcinea	126.3	0.50	3	MBA (inner)	S	14.29	11.59	LCDB · List
519.	3020 Naudts	126.2	0.46	2	MBA (outer)	C	16.02	12.71	LCDB · List
520.	(190395) 1999 TR_{109}	126	0.53	2	MBA (outer)	C	3.65	15.91	LCDB · List
521.	(228328) 2000 RO_{19}	125.6	0.76	2	MBA (middle)	S	2.28	16.33	LCDB · List
522.	6995 Minoyama	125.3	0.76	2	MBA (inner)	S	5.72	13.58	LCDB · List
523.	(110059) 2001 SK_{107}	125.2	0.46	2	MBA (outer)	C	4.84	15.30	LCDB · List
524.	(95704) 2002 JS_{124}	125.1	1.00	2	MBA (inner)	S	2.71	15.20	LCDB · List
525.	1575 Winifred	125	1.20	3	Phocaea	S	9.40	12.10	LCDB · List
526.	(152679) 1998 KU2	125	1.35	2	NEO	S	1.42	16.60	LCDB · List
527.	(119553) 2001 VH_{36}	124.1	0.90	2	MBA (inner)	S	2.51	15.37	LCDB · List
528.	33699 Jessiegan	124	0.33	2	MBA (outer)	C	6.31	14.73	LCDB · List
529.	2678 Aavasaksa	124	1.30	2	Flora	S	8.58	12.50	LCDB · List
530.	(35532) 1998 FV_{71}	123.8	0.40	2	MBA (middle)	S	3.89	15.17	LCDB · List
531.	(234886) 2002 TL_{88}	123.7	0.67	2	MBA (outer)	C	3.30	16.14	LCDB · List
532.	959 Arne	123.7	0.24	3−	MBA (outer)	C	57.20	10.80	LCDB · List
533.	(372858) 2010 VB_{171}	123.5	0.39	2	Mars crosser	S	0.68	18.21	LCDB · List
534.	2629 Rudra	123.2	0.58	2	Mars crosser	S	2.19	15.67	LCDB · List
535.	(31173) 1997 XF_{1}	122.8	0.67	2+	Hungaria	E	2.54	14.90	LCDB · List
536.	14980 Gustavbrom	122.6	0.51	2	MBA (outer)	C	5.71	14.95	LCDB · List
537.	4689 Donn	122.5	0.64	2+	Flora	S	5.51	13.46	LCDB · List
538.	(134555) 1999 RN_{169}	122.4	0.29	2	Erigone	C	2.88	16.43	LCDB · List
539.	870 Manto	122.3	0.80	3	MBA (inner)	S	13.71	11.68	LCDB · List
540.	1775 Zimmerwald	122	0.60	2+	Eunomia	S	11.55	12.00	LCDB · List
541.	(26084) 1981 EK_{17}	122	0.68	2	Vestian	S	2.83	15.11	LCDB · List
542.	(97314) 1999 XV_{206}	121.7	0.67	2	MBA (outer)	C	4.83	15.31	LCDB · List
543.	(21002) 1987 QU_{7}	121.6	0.41	2	MBA (inner)	S	3.13	14.89	LCDB · List
544.	12465 Perth Amboy	121.6	0.87	2	Nysa	S	2.40	15.41	LCDB · List
545.	1007 Pawlowia	121	0.51	2	MBA (outer)	K	30.59	11.30	LCDB · List
546.	(76708) 2000 HE_{101}	121	0.67	2	MBA (outer)	C	6.15	14.78	LCDB · List
547.	(247283) 2001 SC_{187}	120.4	0.93	2	MBA (outer)	C	3.82	15.82	LCDB · List
548.	988 Appella	120	0.40	2	Themis	S	25.77	11.60	LCDB · List
549.	(21207) 1994 PH_{29}	120	0.50	2	MBA (outer)	C	8.43	14.10	LCDB · List
550.	2936 Nechvile	119.6	0.48	2	MBA (middle)	S	13.52	12.46	LCDB · List
551.	(443923) 2002 RU_{25}	119.4	0.98	2	NEO	S	0.90	17.60	LCDB · List
552.	9910 Vogelweide	118.9	0.74	2	Koronis	S	4.94	13.70	LCDB · List
553.	1455 Mitchella	118.7	0.60	2+	Flora	S	7.47	12.80	LCDB · List
554.	(122007) 2000 GC_{7}	118.2	0.74	2	MBA (inner)	S	1.96	15.90	LCDB · List
555.	4951 Iwamoto	118	0.38	3	MBA (inner)	S	5.53	13.74	LCDB · List
556.	4635 Rimbaud	117.9	1.08	2+	Vestian	S	7.46	13.00	LCDB · List
557.	7694 Krasetin	117.8	0.92	3−	MBA (outer)	C	20.21	12.20	LCDB · List
558.	(163594) 2002 TH_{207}	117.7	0.94	2	MBA (outer)	C	3.05	16.31	LCDB · List
559.	(36713) 2000 RV_{33}	116.9	0.52	2	MBA (outer)	C	6.12	14.80	LCDB · List
560.	(376059) 2010 FY_{14}	116.9	0.60	2	MBA (outer)	C	4.20	15.61	LCDB · List
561.	(17297) 3560 P-L	116.8	0.74	2	MBA (outer)	C	17.48	12.51	LCDB · List
562.	(21954) 1999 VU_{178}	115.7	0.41	2	Eunomia	S	3.14	14.83	LCDB · List
563.	(146918) 2002 CT_{225}	115.7	0.83	2	MBA (outer)	C	5.25	15.13	LCDB · List
564.	4219 Nakamura	115.5	0.20	2	Nysa	S	4.62	13.99	LCDB · List
565.	12868 Onken	115	0.60	2	MBA (outer)	C	15.33	12.80	LCDB · List
566.	(280589) 2004 TX_{348}	114.7	0.46	2	MBA (outer)	C	2.55	16.69	LCDB · List
567.	(75353) 1999 XL_{69}	114.7	0.30	2	MBA (inner)	S	1.75	16.14	LCDB · List
568.	(107855) 2001 FU_{78}	114.6	0.37	2	Flora	S	1.79	15.90	LCDB · List
569.	(201710) 2003 UO_{167}	114.6	0.75	2	MBA (outer)	C	3.51	16.00	LCDB · List
570.	(121534) 1999 UJ_{41}	114.5	0.57	2	MBA (outer)	C	3.13	16.25	LCDB · List
571.	(253198) 2002 XO_{60}	114.5	0.67	2	MBA (inner)	S	1.50	16.49	LCDB · List
572.	(143651) 2003 QO104	114.4	1.60	3	NEO	S	1.88	16.00	LCDB · List
573.	2845 Franklinken	114	0.80	3−	Baptistina	C	12.18	13.30	LCDB · List
574.	(18582) 1997 XK9	114	0.94	3	Hungaria	E	4.84	13.50	LCDB · List
575.	(15533) 2000 AP_{138}	114	0.38	3	MBA (inner)	S	4.42	14.18	LCDB · List
576.	(116301) 2003 YZ_{60}	114	0.80	2	MBA (outer)	C	3.38	16.08	LCDB · List
577.	(258817) 2002 NY_{57}	113.8	0.60	2	MBA (outer)	C	4.61	15.41	LCDB · List
578.	(13593) 1994 NF_{1}	113.7	0.64	2	MBA (inner)	S	4.02	14.34	LCDB · List
579.	(200481) 2000 YX_{17}	113.6	1.11	2	MBA (inner)	S	1.84	16.04	LCDB · List
580.	(48593) 1994 VF	113.3	0.81	2	MBA (inner)	S	2.39	15.48	LCDB · List
581.	6582 Flagsymphony	113.3	0.28	2+	MBA (outer)	C	15.33	12.80	LCDB · List
582.	3138 Ciney	113	0.56	2+	Flora	S	5.93	13.30	LCDB · List
583.	(15778) 1993 NH	113	0.61	2	Mars crosser	S	3.41	14.70	LCDB · List
584.	(411201) 2010 LJ_{14}	113	0.85	2	NEO	S	0.82	17.80	LCDB · List
585.	(40893) 1999 TL_{138}	113	0.35	2	MBA (outer)	C	4.90	15.28	LCDB · List
586.	100229 Jeanbailly	112.9	0.51	2	Hilda	C	7.70	14.30	LCDB · List
587.	7489 Oribe	112.7	0.80	2	MBA (outer)	C	9.65	13.81	LCDB · List
588.	5561 Iguchi	112.4	0.43	2	Flora	S	5.93	13.30	LCDB · List
589.	21609 Williamcaleb	112	0.50	2	MBA (inner)	S	4.71	14.00	LCDB · List
590.	(378610) 2008 FT_{6}	112	0.77	2	NEO	S	0.98	17.40	LCDB · List
591.	3383 Koyama	111.8	0.62	2	MBA (inner)	S	8.76	12.65	LCDB · List
592.	(247651) 2002 WK_{15}	111.6	0.61	2	MBA (outer)	C	3.34	16.11	LCDB · List
593.	(102588) 1999 UM_{52}	111.2	0.46	2	MBA (outer)	C	6.69	14.60	LCDB · List
594.	5390 Huichiming	111	0.75	2+	Hungaria	E	4.62	13.60	LCDB · List
595.	9233 Itagijun	111	0.60	2	MBA (inner)	S	7.13	13.10	LCDB · List
596.	(31068) 1996 TT54	110.8	0.64	2	MBA (middle)	S	7.12	13.85	LCDB · List
597.	(112324) 2002 MA_{3}	110.8	0.59	2	Flora	S	1.16	16.85	LCDB · List
598.	(230290) 2001 YQ_{13}	110.5	0.84	2	MBA (inner)	S	1.48	16.51	LCDB · List
599.	(219543) 2001 QB_{293}	110.4	0.40	2	MBA (inner)	S	1.53	16.44	LCDB · List
600.	(93756) 2000 WZ_{8}	110.3	0.55	2	MBA (inner)	S	3.41	14.70	LCDB · List
601.	(42500) 1992 RV_{6}	110.2	0.63	2	Themis	C	5.00	14.86	LCDB · List
602.	(58085) 1199 T-3	110	0.80	2	MBA (outer)	C	5.31	15.10	LCDB · List
603.	(223751) 2004 RR_{196}	110	0.55	2	MBA (outer)	C	3.81	15.83	LCDB · List
604.	(60024) 1999 TW_{47}	109.9	0.28	2	MBA (outer)	C	4.39	15.51	LCDB · List
605.	343 Ostara	109.9	0.52	3−	MBA (inner)	CSGU	19.03	11.74	LCDB · List
606.	(42282) 2001 SB_{283}	109.7	0.83	2	Eunomia	S	3.44	14.63	LCDB · List
607.	(366326) 2013 EW_{39}	109.6	0.58	2	MBA (middle)	S	1.93	16.69	LCDB · List
608.	(15701) 1987 RG1	109.4	0.50	2	MBA (inner)	S	3.25	14.81	LCDB · List
609.	(108067) 2001 FO_{165}	109.3	0.73	2	Flora	S	1.28	16.63	LCDB · List
610.	(149612) 2004 EO_{7}	109.3	0.80	2	Flora	S	1.25	16.68	LCDB · List
611.	(134696) 1999 XZ_{96}	109.1	0.44	2	MBA (inner)	S	1.41	16.62	LCDB · List
612.	(523186) 2016 UG_{5}	109.1	0.97	2	Hungaria	ES	0.42	18.80	LCDB · List
613.	9739 Powell	109	0.40	2	Hungaria	E	3.82	13.70	LCDB · List
614.	(5773) 1989 NO	109	0.74	2	Flora	S	5.17	13.60	LCDB · List
615.	5518 Mariobotta	108.6	0.56	2+	Flora	S	7.14	12.90	LCDB · List
616.	946 Poësia	108.5	0.32	2+	Themis	FU	43.75	10.42	LCDB · List
617.	(162772) 2000 WX_{175}	108.5	0.75	2	MBA (inner)	S	1.87	16.01	LCDB · List
618.	(119175) 2001 QU_{53}	108.5	0.71	2	MBA (inner)	S	1.20	16.98	LCDB · List
619.	(37212) 2000 WO_{126}	108.2	1.04	2	MBA (outer)	C	5.93	14.86	LCDB · List
620.	57868 Pupin	108.1	0.93	3−	MBA (inner)	S	2.59	15.30	LCDB · List
621.	989 Schwassmannia	107.9	0.39	3	MBA (middle)	S	12.81	11.90	LCDB · List
622.	(201187) 2002 PK_{70}	107.1	0.44	2	MBA (outer)	C	4.22	15.60	LCDB · List
623.	5711 Eneev	107.1	0.15	2	Hilda	C	38.81	11.10	LCDB · List
624.	1703 Barry	107.1	0.50	3	Flora	S	9.54	12.10	LCDB · List
625.	6626 Mattgenge	107.1	0.48	2	MBA (outer)	C	6.53	14.66	LCDB · List
626.	(113507) 2002 TS_{7}	106.6	0.62	2	MBA (outer)	C	6.97	14.51	LCDB · List
627.	3935 Toatenmongakkai	106.3	0.58	2	MBA (inner)	S	11.50	11.90	LCDB · List
628.	(69317) 1993 FB_{20}	106.3	1.50	3−	MBA (inner)	S	2.97	15.00	LCDB · List
629.	5691 Fredwatson	106	1.20	3−	Phocaea	S	6.06	13.30	LCDB · List
630.	3043 San Diego	105.7	0.60	3−	Hungaria	E	4.42	13.70	LCDB · List
631.	(147241) 2002 XW_{62}	105.5	0.67	2	MBA (inner)	S	1.53	16.44	LCDB · List
632.	1773 Rumpelstilz	105.4	0.77	3	Vestian	S	12.39	11.90	LCDB · List
633.	9488 Huia	105.3	0.80	2	Flora	S	2.71	15.00	LCDB · List
634.	7153 Vladzakharov	105.1	0.76	2	MBA (inner)	S	3.06	14.94	LCDB · List
635.	(33313) 1998 KJ_{60}	105	0.62	2	MBA (outer)	C	6.49	14.67	LCDB · List
636.	33319 Kunqu	105	0.90	2+	Hungaria	E	2.43	15.00	LCDB · List
637.	(106620) 2000 WL_{124}	104.5	0.58	2	Hungaria	E	2.43	15.00	LCDB · List
638.	(25866) 2000 GA_{100}	104.5	0.52	2	MBA (outer)	C	9.96	13.74	LCDB · List
639.	(6003) 1988 VO1	104.4	0.42	2	Flora	S	5.67	13.40	LCDB · List
640.	(161221) 2002 XJ_{1}	104.2	0.42	2	MBA (outer)	C	4.66	15.39	LCDB · List
641.	2077 Kiangsu	104.2	0.30	2+	Mars crosser	S	5.66	13.60	LCDB · List
642.	(8173) 1991 RX23	104.1	0.74	2	Eos	S	5.88	13.90	LCDB · List
643.	(93738) 2000 VQ_{50}	104	0.50	2	Eunomia	S	3.41	14.65	LCDB · List
644.	(6425) 1994 WZ3	103.9	0.92	2	Eunomia	C	10.06	12.30	LCDB · List
645.	(44683) 1999 RR_{197}	103.8	0.72	2	Flora	S	2.14	15.51	LCDB · List
646.	(145553) 2006 LN_{5}	103.3	0.56	2	MBA (inner)	S	1.26	16.86	LCDB · List
647.	14819 Nikolaylaverov	103.3	0.58	2	MBA (inner)	S	3.07	14.93	LCDB · List
648.	(22357) 1992 YJ	103	0.54	2	MBA (inner)	S	5.66	13.60	LCDB · List
649.	26447 Akrishnan	102.9	0.56	2	Nysa	S	2.37	15.44	LCDB · List
650.	(112516) 2002 PG_{26}	102.9	0.63	2	MBA (outer)	C	4.78	15.33	LCDB · List
651.	617 Patroclus	102.8	0.07	3	Jupiter trojan	P	140.92	8.19	LCDB · List
652.	(13378) 1998 VF35	102.5	0.77	2	Eos	S	10.43	12.66	LCDB · List
653.	(203819) 2002 TZ_{237}	102.3	0.20	2	MBA (outer)	C	4.08	15.68	LCDB · List
654.	(214869) 2007 PA8	102.2	0.58	3	NEO	S	1.38	16.67	LCDB · List
655.	(96144) 3466 T-3	102.2	0.68	2	MBA (outer)	C	4.27	15.58	LCDB · List
656.	(7663) 1994 RX1	102.1	0.34	2	Phocaea	S	4.21	14.09	LCDB · List
657.	(91339) 1999 JR_{15}	101.9	0.35	2	MBA (inner)	S	4.06	14.32	LCDB · List
658.	(197299) 2003 WH_{128}	101.8	0.60	2	MBA (outer)	C	4.11	15.66	LCDB · List
659.	(43464) 2001 AA_{9}	101.6	0.75	2	Flora	S	1.98	15.68	LCDB · List
660.	(123754) 2001 AR_{32}	101.4	0.90	2	MBA (inner)	S	2.06	15.80	LCDB · List
661.	(33295) 1998 KV_{40}	101.3	0.98	2	Eos	S	4.97	14.27	LCDB · List
662.	19763 Klimesh	101	0.67	2	Phocaea	S	7.29	13.27	LCDB · List
663.	930 Westphalia	100.7	0.15	2	MBA (inner)	C	36.53	11.20	LCDB · List
664.	1097 Vicia	100.5	0.14	2	MBA (middle)	S	20.99	12.00	LCDB · List
665.	(169855) 2002 RU_{41}	100.4	0.90	2	MBA (outer)	C	4.72	15.36	LCDB · List
666.	2004 XP14	100	–	2	NEO	S	0.30	19.40	LCDB · MPC
667.	2005 OE_{3}	100	–	2	NEO	S	0.26	20.30	LCDB · MPC

back to top

== Potentially slow rotators ==
Potentially slow rotators have their rotation period estimated based on a fragmentary light curve. They are listed separately from the more reliable results above, that have a quality code (U) of 2 or higher. The periods for potentially slow rotators may be completely wrong (U=1), have no complete and conclusive result (U=n.a.), a large error margins of more than 30% (U=2−), or anything in between.

=== Possible periods above 1000 hours ===
Minor planet designation	Rotation period (hours)	Δmag	Quality (U)	Orbit or family	Spectral type	Diameter (km)	Abs. mag (H)	Refs
(300163) 2006 VW139	3240	–	n.a.	MBA (outer)	C	3.20	16.20	LCDB · List
(11474) 1982 SM2	1917.2	0.04	1	Baptistina	C	5.71	14.94	LCDB · List
(145727) 1994 PL_{29}	1084.9	0.06	1	Nysa	S	1.43	16.54	LCDB · List
5316 Filatov	1061.4	0.07	1	MBA (outer)	C	22.95	11.92	LCDB · List

back to top

=== Possible periods between 500 and 1000 hours ===
Minor planet designation	Rotation period (hours)	Δmag	Quality (U)	Orbit or family	Spectral type	Diameter (km)	Abs. mag (H)	Refs
(79590) 1998 RX_{19}	988.8	0.07	1	Flora	S	1.87	15.81	LCDB · List
9556 Gaywray	920	0.50	2−	Phocaea	S	6.48	13.71	LCDB · List
(111346) 2001 XS_{103}	747.7	0.07	1	Mars crosser	S	1.18	17.01	LCDB · List
3322 Lidiya	710	0.60	1	Phocaea	S	7.99	12.70	LCDB · List
17091 Senthalir	679.9	0.07	1	MBA (outer)	C	8.37	14.11	LCDB · List
(22121) 2000 SM_{107}	537.5	0.05	1	MBA (inner)	S	2.59	15.30	LCDB · List
(188077) 2001 XW_{47}	525	0.30	2−	Hungaria	E	1.60	15.90	LCDB · List
(24454) 2000 QF_{198}	500	0.40	2−	Jupiter trojan	C	29.21	11.40	LCDB · List

back to top

=== Possible periods of 400+ hours ===
Minor planet designation	Rotation period (hours)	Δmag	Quality (U)	Orbit or family	Spectral type	Diameter (km)	Abs. mag (H)	Refs
20571 Tiamorrison	450	0.60	2−	Flora	S	2.97	14.80	LCDB · List
12860 Turney	438.1	0.08	1	MBA (inner)	S	3.04	14.95	LCDB · List
(41917) 2000 WC_{153}	412.6	0.09	1	Flora	S	1.73	15.97	LCDB · List
(106647) 2000 WC_{135}	411.1	0.07	1	Flora	S	1.44	16.38	LCDB · List
(39687) 1996 RL_{3}	402.5	0.10	1	Flora	S	1.70	16.01	LCDB · List
7119 Hiera	400	0.10	1	Jupiter trojan	C	76.45	9.70	LCDB · List
(13366) 1998 US24	400	0.23	2−	Jupiter trojan	C	32.03	11.20	LCDB · List

back to top

=== Possible periods of 300+ hours ===
Minor planet designation	Rotation period (hours)	Δmag	Quality (U)	Orbit or family	Spectral type	Diameter (km)	Abs. mag (H)	Refs
(22135) 2000 UA_{100}	393	0.25	2−	Eunomia	S	6.96	13.10	LCDB · List
(98063) 2000 RG_{48}	358.3	0.08	1	Flora	S	1.73	15.98	LCDB · List
(266992) 2010 XR_{43}	350	–	n.a.	Jupiter trojan	C	12.18	13.30	LCDB · List
5511 Cloanthus	336	0.49	2−	Jupiter trojan	C	48.48	10.30	LCDB · List
(381677) 2009 BJ_{81}	325	0.40	n.a.	NEO	S	0.65	18.30	LCDB · List
(36227) 1999 UR_{5}	322	0.07	1	MBA (outer)	C	12.11	13.31	LCDB · List

back to top

=== Possible periods of 200+ hours ===
Minor planet designation	Rotation period (hours)	Δmag	Quality (U)	Orbit or family	Spectral type	Diameter (km)	Abs. mag (H)	Refs
(17122) 1999 JH_{63}	290.1	0.09	1	Koronis	S	4.84	13.74	LCDB · List
(31013) 1996 DR	280	0.50	2−	MBA (inner)	S	4.50	14.10	LCDB · List
3184 Raab	274.9	0.09	1	MBA (middle)	S	13.25	12.51	LCDB · List
7188 Yoshii	260	0.49	1+	Flora	S	4.50	13.90	LCDB · List
(103405) 2000 AM_{134}	260	0.50	1	MBA (inner)	S	1.71	16.20	LCDB · List
(41609) 2000 SR_{117}	259.9	0.07	1	Erigone	C	3.13	16.25	LCDB · List
5025 Mecisteus	250	0.20	1	Jupiter trojan	C	57.56	10.30	LCDB · List
(15977) 1998 MA11	250	0.30	2−	Jupiter trojan	C	46.30	10.40	LCDB · List
(84045) 2002 PN_{58}	240	0.50	1	MBA (inner)	S	2.06	15.80	LCDB · List
(65240) 2002 EU_{106}	230	0.22	1	Jupiter trojan	C	16.81	12.60	LCDB · List
(35259) 1996 HN_{24}	230	0.45	2−	Flora	S	3.58	14.40	LCDB · List
90842 Orcus	228.94			TNO	(neutral)	958.4	2.31	LCDB · List
(185085) 2006 RG_{92}	220	0.40	1	MBA (outer)	C	3.06	16.30	LCDB · List
8885 Sette	212	0.50	2−	MBA (inner)	S	5.41	13.70	LCDB · List
(108592) 2001 MC_{13}	208.1	0.08	1	MBA (inner)	S	1.90	15.98	LCDB · List
(145425) 2005 QP_{39}	200	0.60	2−	MBA (outer)	C	5.57	15.00	LCDB · List
(43904) 1995 WO	200	0.34	2−	MBA (inner)	S	2.84	15.10	LCDB · List

back to top

=== Possible periods of 100+ hours ===
Minor planet designation	Rotation period (hours)	Δmag	Quality (U)	Orbit or family	Spectral type	Diameter (km)	Abs. mag (H)	Refs
(51220) 2000 JG_{23}	198.8	0.08	1	Eunomia	S	2.85	15.04	LCDB · List
(90585) 2032 P-L	196.5	0.08	1	MBA (inner)	S	2.25	15.60	LCDB · List
(109362) 2001 QO_{157}	194.8	0.08	1	Vestian	S	1.66	16.26	LCDB · List
(33816) 2000 AL_{42}	193	0.12	2−	Hungaria	E	2.54	14.90	LCDB · List
(60949) 2000 JM_{61}	185.3	0.08	1	MBA (inner)	S	1.71	16.20	LCDB · List
3436 Ibadinov	170	1.00	1	Koronis	S	8.58	12.50	LCDB · List
(16558) 1991 VQ_{2}	170	1.00	2−	Phocaea	S	5.53	13.50	LCDB · List
(104296) 2000 ET_{169}	167.3	0.09	1	MBA (outer)	C	5.77	14.92	LCDB · List
(29019) 6095 P-L	160	0.35	1+	MBA (outer)	C	8.82	14.00	LCDB · List
44530 Horakova	160	2.68	1	MBA (inner)	S	7.13	13.10	LCDB · List
(33108) 1997 YJ18	155	0.40	1+	Koronis	C	4.30	14.00	LCDB · List
957 Camelia	150	0.30	1+	MBA (outer)	C	73.63	9.90	LCDB · List
(77216) 2001 FO_{24}	150	1.00	1+	MBA (outer)	C	5.32	15.10	LCDB · List
(79782) 1998 UN_{40}	150	0.20	1+	MBA (inner)	S	2.59	15.30	LCDB · List
(57453) 2001 SL_{70}	148.7	0.08	1	Flora	S	2.16	15.50	LCDB · List
(49586) 1999 CD_{138}	144	1.00	2−	MBA (outer)	C	9.67	13.80	LCDB · List
(72823) 2001 HO_{3}	141.4	0.09	1	MBA (outer)	C	8.82	14.00	LCDB · List
4147 Lennon	137	0.60	1	Vestian	S	7.46	13.00	LCDB · List
4283 Stoffler	136	0.65	2−	Phocaea	S	7.99	12.70	LCDB · List
(27005) 1998 DR_{35}	134	1.20	1+	MBA (inner)	S	3.92	14.40	LCDB · List
(15241) 1989 ST_{3}	133.8	0.10	1	MBA (middle)	S	3.82	15.21	LCDB · List
(200032) 2007 PU_{43}	132	1.80	1+	Jupiter trojan	C	14.64	12.90	LCDB · List
19598 Luttrell	132	0.09	1	Flora	S	2.29	15.37	LCDB · List
10390 Lenka	130	0.09	1	MBA (inner)	S	2.37	15.49	LCDB · List
(496174) 2011 CQ_{4}	128	0.19	2−	NEO	S	0.62	18.40	LCDB · List
(279121) 2009 OP_{22}	126.5	0.10	1	MBA (inner)	S	1.06	17.25	LCDB · List
(134549) 1999 RN_{154}	124	0.55	2−	Flora	S	1.97	15.70	LCDB · List
(56056) 1998 XP_{58}	121.1	0.06	1	Flora	S	2.70	15.01	LCDB · List
(136992) 1998 SL_{45}	119	0.30	1+	MBA (inner)	S	2.36	15.50	LCDB · List
(377993) 2006 RC_{39}	116	0.50	1	Flora	S	0.94	17.30	LCDB · List
15132 Steigmeyer	115	0.62	1+	Vestian	S	2.15	15.70	LCDB · List
2013 BE_{19}	115	0.40	2−	NEO	S	0.33	19.80	LCDB · MPC
(52011) 2002 LW_{19}	114.5	0.08	1	MBA (inner)	S	2.45	15.42	LCDB · List
(146975) 2002 NF_{26}	111.3	0.09	1	Baptistina	C	2.23	16.99	LCDB · List
(39240) 2000 YZ_{69}	105	1.60	2−	MBA (outer)	C	7.34	14.40	LCDB · List
3454 Lieske	105	0.73	2−	Flora	S	5.93	13.30	LCDB · List
39420 Elizabethgaskell	105	1.60	2−	Hungaria	E	2.43	15.00	LCDB · List
1581 Abanderada	102.8	0.10	2−	Themis	BCU	39.28	10.85	LCDB · List
3981 Stodola	102.7	0.08	1	Themis	C	16.58	12.26	LCDB · List
(98342) 2000 SD_{299}	102.5	0.09	1	Flora	S	1.17	16.82	LCDB · List
21369 Gertfinger	100.9	0.09	1	MBA (outer)	C	8.68	14.04	LCDB · List
4558 Janesick	100	0.11	1	Mars crosser	S	8.30	12.77	LCDB · List
(32750) 1981 EG_{9}	100	0.60	1	MBA (outer)	C	7.68	14.30	LCDB · List
(95711) 2003 AK	100	0.70	2−	Mars crosser	S	3.41	14.70	LCDB · List
(90454) 2004 CV	100	0.30	2−	Flora	S	2.26	15.40	LCDB · List
(80636) 2000 AV_{214}	100	3.00	1	MBA (inner)	S	1.42	16.60	LCDB · List

back to top

== See also ==
- Light curve
- List of exceptional asteroids
- List of minor planets
