= 3982 Kastelʹ =

Florian asteroid and a suspected binary system

Discovery
- Discovered by: L. G. Karachkina
- Discovery site: Crimean Astrophysical Obs.
- Discovery date: 2 May 1984

Designations
- Named after: Galina Ričardovna Kastelʹ (astronomer)
- Alternative designations: 1984 JP_{1} · 1930 MF; 1947 NE · 1954 RC; 1978 TT_{5}
- Minor planet category: main-belt · Flora

Orbital characteristics
- Epoch 4 September 2017 (JD 2458000.5)
- Uncertainty parameter 0
- Observation arc: 86.77 yr (31,691 days)
- Aphelion: 2.7546 AU
- Perihelion: 1.7625 AU
- Semi-major axis: 2.2586 AU
- Eccentricity: 0.2196
- Orbital period (sidereal): 3.39 yr (1,240 days)
- Mean anomaly: 230.45°
- Mean motion: 0° 17^{m} 25.44^{s} / day
- Inclination: 5.2970°
- Longitude of ascending node: 251.91°
- Argument of perihelion: 50.950°

Physical characteristics
- Dimensions: 6.790±0.363 km 6.90 km (taken); 6.901 km
- Synodic rotation period: 8.4877±0.0005 h (Note: Pravec (2014) web: rotation period 8.4877±0.0005 hours with a brightness amplitude of 0.28 mag. Summary figures for (3982) Kastelʹ at Collaborative Asteroid Lightcurve Link (CALL) and Pravec, P.; Wolf, M.; Sarounova, L. (2014)); 8.488±0.003 h
- Geometric albedo: 0.1695; 0.201±0.031
- Spectral type: P · S
- Absolute magnitude (H): 12.9 · 13.2 · 13.35±0.08

3982 Kastelʹ, provisional designation 1984 JP_{1}, is a Florian asteroid and a suspected binary system from the inner regions of the asteroid belt, approximately 6.9 kilometers in diameter.

It was discovered on 2 May 1984, by Russian astronomer Lyudmila Karachkina at the Crimean Astrophysical Observatory in Nauchnij on the Crimean peninsula. It is named after Soviet astronomer Galina Kastelʹ.

== Classification and orbit ==
Kastelʹ is a member of the Flora family, one of the largest families of stony asteroids. It orbits the Sun in the inner main-belt at a distance of 1.8–2.8 AU once every 3 years and 5 months (1,240 days). Its orbit has an eccentricity of 0.22 and an inclination of 5° with respect to the ecliptic. Kastelʹ was first identified as 1930 MF at Lowell Observatory in 1930, extending the asteroid's observation arc by 54 years prior to its discovery observation.

== Physical characteristics ==
Kastelʹ has been characterized as a dark and reddish P-type asteroid by the NEOWISE mission of NASA's Wide-field Infrared Survey Explorer, despite measuring an albedo of 0.20. It is also an assumed S-type asteroid.

=== Diameter and albedo ===
According to the survey carried out by NASA's Wide-field Infrared Survey Explorer (WISE) with its subsequent NEOWISE mission, Kastelʹ measures 6.79 kilometers in diameter and its surface has an albedo of 0.201, while Petr Pravec's revised estimates of the thermal WISE observation gave a lower albedo of 0.1695 and consequently a larger diameter of 6.90 kilometers with an absolute magnitude of 13.35.

=== Lightcurve ===
In September 2009 and February 2014, two rotational lightcurves were obtained for this asteroid. Lightcurve analysis gave a rotation period of 8.4877 and 8.488 hours with a brightness variation of 0.27 and 0.28 magnitude, respectively (U=n.a.).

=== Suspected binary ===
During the first of the two a photometric observations – a collaboration between Czech astronomers Petr Pravec, Peter Kušnirák, Leonard Kornoš and Jozef Világi at Ondřejov Observatory, as well as American astronomers Donald Pray, Russel Durkee, Walter R. Cooney Jr., John Gross and Dirk Terrell at several locations in the United States – it was revealed, that Kastelʹ's lightcurve consisted of two linearly additive components, indicative for the presence of an asteroid moon. However, no attenuations were observed, which typically occur when the primary and secondary body are eclipsing each other. After a second observation in 2014, the binary nature of Kastelʹ still remains uncertain. The "Johnstonsarchive" gives no estimates.

== Naming ==
This minor planet was named in honor of Soviet astronomer Galina Ričardovna Kastelʹ astronomer at the Institute for Theoretical Astronomy (ITA) at Saint Petersburg (then Leningrad). A discoverer of minor planets herself, she is a known expert of the motions of small Solar System bodies and was involved with astrometric work at the discovering observatory. The approved naming citation was published by the Minor Planet Center on 28 May 1991 (M.P.C. 18306).
