= Lyudmila Karachkina =

Ukrainian astronomer (born 1948)

Minor planets discovered: 130
see § List of discovered minor planets

Lyudmila Georgievna Karachkina (Russian: Людмила Георгиевна Карачкина, born 3 September 1948, Rostov-on-Don) is an astronomer and discoverer of minor planets.

In 1978, she began as a staff astronomer of the Institute for Theoretical Astronomy (ITA) in Leningrad. Her research at the Crimean Astrophysical Observatory (CrAO) then focused on astrometry and photometry of minor planets. The Minor Planet Center credits her with the discovery of 130 minor planets, including the Amor asteroid 5324 Lyapunov and the Trojan asteroid 3063 Makhaon. In 2004, she received a Ph.D. in astronomy from Odesa I. I. Mechnikov National University.

Lyudmila Karachkina has two daughters, Maria and Renata. The inner main-belt asteroid 8019 Karachkina, discovered by German astronomers Lutz D. Schmadel and Freimut Börngen at Tautenburg on 14 October 1990, was named in her honor (M.P.C. 35489). On 23 November 1999, the minor planet 8089 Yukar was named after her husband, Yurij Vasil'evicht Karachkin (b. 1940), a physics teacher at CrAO's school. (M.P.C. 36946).

== List of discovered minor planets ==
| 2892 Filipenko | January 13, 1983 | MPC |
| 3063 Makhaon | August 4, 1983 | MPC |
| 3067 Akhmatova | October 14, 1982 | MPC^{[1]} |
| 3068 Khanina | December 23, 1982 | MPC |
| 3215 Lapko | January 23, 1980 | MPC |
| 3286 Anatoliya | January 23, 1980 | MPC |
| 3345 Tarkovskij | December 23, 1982 | MPC |
| 3437 Kapitsa | October 20, 1982 | MPC |
| 3453 Dostoevsky | September 27, 1981 | MPC |
| 3469 Bulgakov | October 21, 1982 | MPC |
| 3508 Pasternak | February 21, 1980 | MPC |
| 3511 Tsvetaeva | October 14, 1982 | MPC^{[1]} |
| 3516 Rusheva | October 21, 1982 | MPC |
| 3620 Platonov | September 7, 1981 | MPC |
| 3623 Chaplin | October 4, 1981 | MPC |
| 3624 Mironov | October 14, 1982 | MPC^{[1]} |
| 3668 Ilfpetrov | October 21, 1982 | MPC |
| 3669 Vertinskij | October 21, 1982 | MPC |
| 3675 Kemstach | December 23, 1982 | MPC |
| 3750 Ilizarov | October 14, 1982 | MPC |
| 3772 Piaf | October 21, 1982 | MPC |
| 3946 Shor | March 5, 1983 | MPC |
| 3982 Kastelʹ | May 2, 1984 | MPC |
| 4017 Disneya | February 21, 1980 | MPC |
| 4071 Rostovdon | September 7, 1981 | MPC |
| 4075 Sviridov | October 14, 1982 | MPC |
| 4080 Galinskij | August 4, 1983 | MPC |
| 4258 Ryazanov | September 1, 1987 | MPC |
| 4475 Voitkevich | October 20, 1982 | MPC |
| 4483 Petofi | September 9, 1986 | MPC |
| 4556 Gumilyov | August 27, 1987 | MPC |
| 4625 Shchedrin | October 20, 1982 | MPC |
| 4626 Plisetskaya | December 23, 1984 | MPC |
| 4741 Leskov | November 10, 1985 | MPC |
| 4785 Petrov | December 17, 1984 | MPC |
| 4861 Nemirovskij | August 27, 1987 | MPC |
| 4928 Vermeer | October 21, 1982 | MPC |
| 4940 Polenov | August 18, 1986 | MPC |
| 4996 Veisberg | August 11, 1986 | MPC |
| 4997 Ksana | October 6, 1986 | MPC |
| 5021 Krylania | November 13, 1982 | MPC |
| 5093 Svirelia | October 14, 1982 | MPC |
| 5094 Seryozha | October 20, 1982 | MPC |
| 5199 Dortmund | September 7, 1981 | MPC |
| 5234 Sechenov | November 4, 1989 | MPC |
| 5247 Krylov | October 20, 1982 | MPC |
| 5316 Filatov | October 21, 1982 | MPC |
| 5324 Lyapunov | September 22, 1987 | MPC |
| 5421 Ulanova | October 14, 1982 | MPC^{[1]} |
| 5422 Hodgkin | December 23, 1982 | MPC |

| 5465 Chumakov | September 9, 1986 | MPC |
| 5615 Iskander | August 4, 1983 | MPC |
| 5666 Rabelais | October 14, 1982 | MPC |
| 5676 Voltaire | September 9, 1986 | MPC |
| 5717 Damir | October 20, 1982 | MPC |
| 5759 Zoshchenko | January 22, 1980 | MPC |
| 5808 Babelʹ | August 27, 1987 | MPC |
| 5896 Narrenschiff | November 12, 1982 | MPC |
| 5902 Talima | August 27, 1987 | MPC |
| 5941 Valencia | October 20, 1982 | MPC |
| 5944 Utesov | May 2, 1984 | MPC |
| 6032 Nobel | August 4, 1983 | MPC |
| 6172 Prokofeana | October 14, 1982 | MPC |
| 6592 Goya | October 3, 1986 | MPC |
| 6763 Kochiny | September 7, 1981 | MPC |
| 6766 Kharms | October 20, 1982 | MPC |
| 6767 Shirvindt | January 6, 1983 | MPC |
| 6821 Ranevskaya | September 29, 1986 | MPC |
| 7109 Heine | September 1, 1983 | MPC |
| 7113 Ostapbender | September 29, 1986 | MPC |
| 7223 Dolgorukij | October 14, 1982 | MPC^{[1]} |
| 7558 Yurlov | October 14, 1982 | MPC |
| 7581 Yudovich | November 14, 1990 | MPC |
| 7632 Stanislav | October 20, 1982 | MPC |
| 7633 Volodymyr | October 21, 1982 | MPC |
| 7741 Fedoseev | September 1, 1983 | MPC |
| 7995 Khvorostovsky | August 4, 1983 | MPC |
| 7996 Vedernikov | September 1, 1983 | MPC |
| 8142 Zolotov | October 20, 1982 | MPC |
| 8332 Ivantsvetaev | October 14, 1982 | MPC^{[1]} |
| 8811 Waltherschmadel | October 20, 1982 | MPC |
| 8812 Kravtsov | October 20, 1982 | MPC |
| 8816 Gamow | December 17, 1984 | MPC |
| 8822 Shuryanka | September 1, 1987 | MPC |
| 9005 Sidorova | October 20, 1982 | MPC |
| 9006 Voytkevych | October 21, 1982 | MPC |
| 9532 Abramenko | September 7, 1981 | MPC |
| 9539 Prishvin | October 21, 1982 | MPC |
| 9540 Mikhalkov | October 21, 1982 | MPC |
| 9737 Dudarova | September 29, 1986 | MPC |
| 9834 Kirsanov | October 14, 1982 | MPC |
| 9927 Tyutchev | October 3, 1981 | MPC |
| 10012 Tmutarakania | September 3, 1978 | MPC ^{[2]} |
| 10031 Vladarnolda | September 7, 1981 | MPC |
| 10049 Vorovich | October 3, 1986 | MPC |
| 10090 Sikorsky | October 13, 1990 | MPC^{[3]} |
| 10287 Smale | October 21, 1982 | MPC |
| 10324 Vladimirov | November 14, 1990 | MPC |
| 10712 Malashchuk | October 20, 1982 | MPC |
| 10713 Limorenko | October 22, 1982 | MPC |

| 10721 Tuterov | August 17, 1986 | MPC |
| 11269 Knyr | August 26, 1987 | MPC |
| 11796 Nirenberg | February 21, 1980 | MPC |
| 12214 Miroshnikov | September 7, 1981 | MPC |
| 12220 Semenchur | October 20, 1982 | MPC |
| 12235 Imranakperov | September 9, 1986 | MPC |
| 12686 Bezuglyj | October 3, 1986 | MPC |
| 13488 Savanov | October 14, 1982 | MPC |
| 13489 Dmitrienko | October 20, 1982 | MPC |
| 13492 Vitalijzakharov | December 27, 1984 | MPC |
| 14814 Gurij | September 7, 1981 | MPC |
| 14818 Mindeli | October 21, 1982 | MPC |
| 14829 Povalyaeva | October 3, 1986 | MPC |
| 15691 Maslov | October 14, 1982 | MPC |
| 18334 Drozdov | September 2, 1987 | MPC |
| 19119 Dimpna | September 27, 1981 | MPC |
| 19120 Doronina | August 6, 1983 | MPC |
| 19127 Olegefremov | August 26, 1987 | MPC |
| 19952 Ashkinazi | October 20, 1982 | MPC |
| 19994 Tresini | October 13, 1990 | MPC^{[3]} |
| 24639 Mukhametdinov | October 20, 1982 | MPC |
| 24641 Enver | September 1, 1983 | MPC |
| 26087 Zhuravleva | October 21, 1982 | MPC |
| 29122 Vasadze | December 24, 1982 | MPC |
| 29125 Kyivphysfak | December 17, 1984 | MPC |
| 32770 Starchik | December 23, 1984 | MPC |
| 42478 Inozemtseva | September 7, 1981 | MPC |
| 43752 Maryosipova | October 20, 1982 | MPC |
| 65658 Gurnikovskaya | October 20, 1982 | MPC |
| 69261 Philaret | December 23, 1982 | MPC |
^{1} co-discovery with L. V. Zhuravleva; ^{2} co-discovery with Nikolai Chernykh; ^{3} co-discovery with G. R. Kastelʹ

== See also ==
- Tamara Smirnova, astronomer at ITA
