= 3345 Tarkovskij =

Asteroid

Discovery
- Discovered by: L. G. Karachkina
- Discovery site: Crimean Astrophysical Obs.
- Discovery date: 23 December 1982

Designations
- Named after: Andrei Tarkovsky (Soviet film-maker)
- Alternative designations: 1982 YC_{1} · 1938 QC; 1952 BD_{2} · 1969 OB
- Minor planet category: main-belt · (inner) background

Orbital characteristics
- Epoch 4 September 2017 (JD 2458000.5)
- Uncertainty parameter 0
- Observation arc: 78.39 yr (28,633 days)
- Aphelion: 2.9425 AU
- Perihelion: 2.0032 AU
- Semi-major axis: 2.4729 AU
- Eccentricity: 0.1899
- Orbital period (sidereal): 3.89 yr (1,420 days)
- Mean anomaly: 296.00°
- Mean motion: 0° 15^{m} 12.6^{s} / day
- Inclination: 15.850°
- Longitude of ascending node: 304.89°
- Argument of perihelion: 194.43°

Physical characteristics
- Dimensions: 20.746±0.129 km 24±2 km
- Synodic rotation period: 187±3 h
- Geometric albedo: 0.029±0.002; 0.0688±0.015
- Spectral type: SMASS = C
- Absolute magnitude (H): 11.8

3345 Tarkovskij, provisional designation 1982 YC_{1}, is a carbonaceous background asteroid from the inner regions of the asteroid belt, approximately 22 kilometers (14 miles) in diameter. It was discovered on 23 December 1982, by Russian astronomer Lyudmila Karachkina at the Crimean Astrophysical Observatory in Nauchnyj, on the Crimean peninsula, and named after filmmaker Andrei Tarkovsky. The C-type asteroid is a slow rotator with a rotation period of 187 hours.

== Orbit and classification ==
Tarkovskij is a non-family asteroid from the main belt's background population. It orbits the Sun in the inner main-belt at a distance of 2.0–2.9 AU once every 3 years and 11 months (1,420 days). Its orbit has an eccentricity of 0.19 and an inclination of 16° with respect to the ecliptic.

It was first observed as 1938 QC at the Heidelberg Observatory in 1938, extending the body's observation arc by 44 years prior to its official discovery observation at Nauchnyj.

== Naming ==
This minor planet named after the Soviet theater director and film-maker Andrei Tarkovsky (1932—1986). The approved naming citation was published by the Minor Planet Center on 31 May 1988 (M.P.C. 13176).

== Physical characteristics ==
In the SMASS classification, Tarkovskij is a carbonaceous C-type asteroid, unusual for inner-belt asteroids which are typically of a stony composition.

=== Slow rotator ===
In January 2014, a rotational lightcurve of Tarkovskij was obtained from photometric observations taken at the Belgrade Observatory and the CS3 DanHenge Observatory (U80). Lightcurve analysis gave a rotation period of 187 hours with a brightness variation of 0.59 magnitude (U=3-). This makes it a slow rotator, as most asteroids have periods shorter than 20 hours.

=== Diameter and albedo ===
According to the surveys carried out by the Infrared Astronomical Satellite IRAS, the Japanese Akari satellite, and NASA's Wide-field Infrared Survey Explorer with its subsequent NEOWISE mission, Tarkovskij measures between 21.02 and 24.17 kilometers in diameter and its surface has an albedo between 0.0407 and 0.096. The Collaborative Asteroid Lightcurve Link derives an albedo of 0.0526 and adopts a diameter of 24.17 kilometers with on an absolute magnitude of 11.9 from the IRAS results.
