= 5316 Filatov =

Main-belt asteroid

Discovery
- Discovered by: L. G. Karachkina
- Discovery site: Crimean Astrophysical Obs.
- Discovery date: 21 October 1982

Designations
- Named after: Vladimir Filatov (ophthalmologist and surgeon)
- Alternative designations: 1982 UB_{7} · 1982 XU_{3} 1987 SF_{9} · 1991 LV_{3}
- Minor planet category: main-belt · (outer)

Orbital characteristics
- Epoch 4 September 2017 (JD 2458000.5)
- Uncertainty parameter 0
- Observation arc: 34.44 yr (12,578 days)
- Aphelion: 3.2253 AU
- Perihelion: 3.0919 AU
- Semi-major axis: 3.1586 AU
- Eccentricity: 0.0211
- Orbital period (sidereal): 5.61 yr (2,050 days)
- Mean anomaly: 18.907°
- Mean motion: 0° 10^{m} 32.16^{s} / day
- Inclination: 14.743°
- Longitude of ascending node: 230.22°
- Argument of perihelion: 240.87°

Physical characteristics
- Dimensions: 22.95 km (calculated); 45.693±0.511 km
- Synodic rotation period: 1061.3756±76.36 h
- Geometric albedo: 0.019±0.003; 0.057 (assumed)
- Spectral type: C
- Absolute magnitude (H): 11.474±0.002 (R) · 11.60 · 11.8 · 11.92 · 11.97±0.48

5316 Filatov, provisional designation 1982 UB_{7}, is a carbonaceous asteroid and potentially slow rotator from the outer region of the asteroid belt, approximately 30 kilometers in diameter.

The asteroid was discovered on 21 October 1982, by Russian astronomer Lyudmila Karachkina at the Crimean Astrophysical Observatory in Nauchnij on the Crimean peninsula. It was later named for surgeon Vladimir Filatov.

== Orbit and classification ==
Filatov orbits the Sun in the outer main-belt at a distance of 3.1–3.2 AU once every 5 years and 7 months (2,050 days). Its orbit has an eccentricity of 0.02 and an inclination of 15° with respect to the ecliptic. The body's observation arc begins at Nauchnij, 2 days after its official discovery observation.

== Physical characteristics ==
=== Potentially slow rotator ===
In November 2010, a rotational lightcurve of Filatov was obtained from photometric observations in the R-band at the Palomar Transient Factory in California. It gave an exceptionally long rotation period of 1061 hours with a brightness variation of 0.07 magnitude (U=1).

However, the fragmentary lightcurve has received a low quality rating by the Collaborative Asteroid Lightcurve Link which means that the result could be completely wrong (also see potentially slow rotator).

=== Diameter and albedo ===
According to the survey carried out by NASA's Wide-field Infrared Survey Explorer with its subsequent NEOWISE mission, Filatov measures 45.69 kilometers in diameter, and its surface has an albedo of 0.019, while the Collaborative Asteroid Lightcurve Link assumes a standard albedo for carbonaceous asteroids of 0.057 and calculates a diameter of 22.95 kilometers with an absolute magnitude of 11.92.

== Naming ==
This minor planet was named in honor of Vladimir Filatov (1875–1956), a Russian and Ukrainian ophthalmologist and surgeon. The official naming citation was published by the Minor Planet Center on 1 September 1993 (M.P.C. 22508).
