= 821 Fanny =

Dark background asteroid and slow rotator

Discovery
- Discovered by: M. F. Wolf
- Discovery site: Heidelberg Obs.
- Discovery date: 31 March 1916

Designations
- Named after: unknown
- Alternative designations: A916 GH · 1930 HC; 1930 HO · 1930 HT; 1916 ZC
- Minor planet category: main-belt · (middle); background

Orbital characteristics
- Epoch 31 May 2020 (JD 2459000.5)
- Uncertainty parameter 0
- Observation arc: 103.84 yr (37,928 d)
- Aphelion: 3.3602 AU
- Perihelion: 2.1833 AU
- Semi-major axis: 2.7718 AU
- Eccentricity: 0.2123
- Orbital period (sidereal): 4.61 yr (1,686 d)
- Mean anomaly: 150.41°
- Mean motion: 0° 12^{m} 48.96^{s} / day
- Inclination: 5.3989°
- Longitude of ascending node: 209.76°
- Argument of perihelion: 32.862°

Physical characteristics
- Mean diameter: 28.77±1.00 km; 28.856±0.168 km
- Synodic rotation period: 236.6 h; 230.6±0.3 h (Note: Lightcurve plot of (821) Fanny by Frederick Pilcher at the Organ Mesa Observatory (G50) in New Mexico (2018). Rotation period 234.0±0.2 hours Quality code of 3–. Summary figures at the LCDB and ALSC websites.); 236.6±0.3 h
- Geometric albedo: 0.038±0.013; 0.040±0.003
- Spectral type: Tholen = C; SMASS = Ch; C (SDSS-MOC); V–R = 0.37±0.03; B–V = 0.706±0.020; U–B = 0.321±0.027
- Absolute magnitude (H): 11.76±0.02; 11.8; 11.84

821 Fanny (prov. designation: A916 GH or 1916 ZC) is a dark background asteroid and slow rotator from the central regions of the asteroid belt. It was discovered on 31 March 1916, by German astronomer Max Wolf at the Heidelberg-Königstuhl State Observatory in southwest Germany. The carbonaceous C-type asteroid (Ch) has an exceptionally long rotation period of 236.6 hours and measures approximately 29 kilometers (18 miles) in diameter. Any reference of the asteroid's name to a person is unknown.

== Orbit and classification ==
Fanny is a non-family asteroid of the main belt's background population when applying the hierarchical clustering method to its proper orbital elements. It orbits the Sun in the central asteroid belt at a distance of 2.2–3.4 AU once every 4 years and 7 months (1,686 days; semi-major axis of 2.77 AU). Its orbit has an eccentricity of 0.21 and an inclination of 5° with respect to the ecliptic. The body's observation arc begins at the Heidelberg Observatory on 1 April 1916, with its first recorded observation, the night after its official discovery.

== Naming ==
Any reference of this minor planet's name to a person or occurrence is unknown.

=== Unknown meaning ===
Among the many thousands of named minor planets, Fanny is one of 120 asteroids for which no official naming citation has been published. All of these asteroids have low numbers, the first being 164 Eva. The last asteroid with a name of unknown meaning is 1514 Ricouxa. They were discovered between 1876 and the 1930s, predominantly by astronomers Auguste Charlois, Johann Palisa, Max Wolf and Karl Reinmuth.

== Physical characteristics ==
In the Tholen classification and in the SDSS-based taxonomy, Fanny is a common, carbonaceous C-type asteroid. In the Bus–Binzel SMASS classification, it is a hydrated carbonaceous Ch-subtype.

=== Rotation period ===
In 2018, from April to June, a rotational lightcurve of Fanny was obtained from photometric observations over 46 nights by Frederick Pilcher at the Organ Mesa Observatory (G50) in New Mexico. Analysis gave a bimodal lightcurve with a rotation period of 236.6±0.3 hours and a brightness variation of 0.22±0.03 magnitude (U=3−). This determination was adopted by the Lightcurve Data base and accounts for Pilcher's observations taken between April and May. For observations taken between May and June, a similar period of 230.6±0.3 hours with a somewhat higher amplitude of 0.28±0.03 magnitude was derived (U=3−). The observer also ruled out non-principal axis rotation ("tumblin"), and considers a double period 470 hours as very unlikely. This makes it a slow rotator, as most asteroids have much shorter periods between 2 and 20 hours. As of 2020, Fanny ranks among the 250th slowest rotator known to exist.

During the same apparition, Tom Polakis at the Command Module Observatory (V02) in Arizona obtained a somewhat longer period of 238.9±0.8 hours with a brightness variation of 0.24±0.03 magnitude (U=2). The result supersedes an incorrect period of 5.44±0.05 hours with an amplitude of 0.01 magnitude from a tentative one-night observation by French amateur astronomers Paul Krafft, Olivier Gerteis, Hubert Gully, Luc Arnold and Matthieu Bachschmidt from 2013 (U=1).

=== Diameter and albedo ===
According to the surveys carried out by the Japanese Akari satellite and the NEOWISE mission of NASA's Wide-field Infrared Survey Explorer (WISE), Fanny measures (28.77±1.00) and (28.856±0.168) kilometers in diameter and its surface has an albedo of (0.040±0.003) and (0.038±0.013), respectively. The Collaborative Asteroid Lightcurve Link assumes a standard albedo for a carbonaceous C-type asteroid of 0.057 and calculates a diameter of 23.86 kilometers based on an absolute magnitude of 11.84. Alternative mean-diameter measurements published by the WISE team include (30.650±0.367 km), (31.50±8.89 km), (32.42±9.57 km) and (35.82±0.35 km) with corresponding albedos of (0.0345±0.0069), (0.03±0.03), (0.03±0.02) and (0.025±0.004).
