= 10660 Felixhormuth =

Main-belt asteroid

Discovery
- Discovered by: C. J. van Houten; I. van Houten-G. T. Gehrels
- Discovery site: Palomar Obs.
- Discovery date: 26 March 1971

Designations
- Named after: Felix Hormuth (discoverer of minor planets)
- Alternative designations: 4348 T-1
- Minor planet category: main-belt · (outer) background

Orbital characteristics
- Epoch 4 September 2017 (JD 2458000.5)
- Uncertainty parameter 0
- Observation arc: 45.27 yr (16,535 days)
- Aphelion: 3.6116 AU
- Perihelion: 2.6985 AU
- Semi-major axis: 3.1551 AU
- Eccentricity: 0.1447
- Orbital period (sidereal): 5.60 yr (2,047 days)
- Mean anomaly: 115.77°
- Mean motion: 0° 10^{m} 33.24^{s} / day
- Inclination: 6.8707°
- Longitude of ascending node: 40.526°
- Argument of perihelion: 122.44°

Physical characteristics
- Dimensions: 7.153±0.137 km
- Geometric albedo: 0.104±0.022
- Absolute magnitude (H): 14.1

10660 Felixhormuth, provisional designation 4348 T-1, is a background asteroid from the outer regions of the asteroid belt, approximately 7 kilometers in diameter. It was discovered on 26 March 1971, by Dutch astronomer couple Ingrid and Cornelis van Houten at Leiden, on photographic plates taken by Dutch–American astronomer Tom Gehrels at Palomar Observatory in California, United States. The asteroid was named after German astronomer Felix Hormuth.

== Orbit and classification ==
Felixhormuth is a non-family asteroid from the main belt's background population. It orbits the Sun in the outer main-belt at a distance of 2.7–3.6 AU once every 5 years and 7 months (2,047 days). Its orbit has an eccentricity of 0.14 and an inclination of 7° with respect to the ecliptic. The body's observation arc begins at Palomar with its official discovery observation in March 1971.

== Physical characteristics ==
=== Diameter and albedo ===
According to the survey carried out by the NEOWISE mission of NASA's Wide-field Infrared Survey Explorer, Felixhormuth measures 7.153 kilometers in diameter and its surface has an albedo of 0.104.

=== Rotation period ===
As of 2017, no rotational lightcurve of Felixhormuth has been obtained from photometric observations. The body's rotation period, pole axis and shape remain unknown.

== Survey designation ==
The survey designation "T-1" stands for the first Palomar–Leiden Trojan survey, named after the fruitful collaboration of the Palomar and Leiden Observatory conducted in 1971. Gehrels used Palomar's Samuel Oschin telescope (also known as the 48-inch Schmidt Telescope), and shipped the photographic plates to Ingrid and Cornelis van Houten at Leiden Observatory where astrometry was carried out. The trio are credited with the discovery of several thousand minor planets.

== Naming ==
This minor planet was named after German astronomer Felix Hormuth (born 1975), a prolific discoverer of minor planets, who worked as an instrumental developer at the Calar Alto Observatory in Spain. Hormuth is a noted supporter of the Faulkes Telescope Educational Project. The asteroid's name was proposed by astronomers Lothar Kurtze and Lutz Schmadel, who are themselves discoverers of minor planets. The official naming citation was published by the Minor Planet Center on 2 April 2007 (M.P.C. 59385).
