= 2892 Filipenko =

Main-belt carbonaceous asteroid

Discovery
- Discovered by: L. G. Karachkina
- Discovery site: Crimean Astrophysical Obs.
- Discovery date: 13 January 1983

Designations
- Named after: Aleksandr Filipenko (Crimean surgeon)
- Alternative designations: 1983 AX_{2} · 1936 QK_{1} 1953 SB · 1953 SL; 1955 DO · 1957 KP; 1964 PA · A910 CK
- Minor planet category: main-belt · (outer)

Orbital characteristics
- Epoch 4 September 2017 (JD 2458000.5)
- Uncertainty parameter 0
- Observation arc: 63.63 yr (23,242 days)
- Aphelion: 3.8269 AU
- Perihelion: 2.5215 AU
- Semi-major axis: 3.1742 AU
- Eccentricity: 0.2056
- Orbital period (sidereal): 5.66 yr (2,066 days)
- Mean anomaly: 97.252°
- Mean motion: 0° 10^{m} 27.48^{s} / day
- Inclination: 16.956°
- Longitude of ascending node: 326.54°
- Argument of perihelion: 91.945°

Physical characteristics
- Dimensions: 56.08 km (derived); 56.13±1.4 km 57.37±0.93 km 69.492±0.396 km
- Synodic rotation period: 14.00±0.01 h
- Geometric albedo: 0.030±0.007; 0.0426 (derived); 0.045±0.002; 0.0466±0.002
- Spectral type: SMASS = C · C
- Absolute magnitude (H): 10.02±0.31 · 10.20 · 10.3

2892 Filipenko, provisional designation 1983 AX_{2}, is a carbonaceous asteroid from the outer region of the asteroid belt, approximately 60 kilometers in diameter.

The asteroid was discovered on 13 January 1983, by Russian female astronomer Lyudmila Karachkina at Crimean Astrophysical Observatory in Nauchnyj, on the Crimean peninsula. It was named after surgeon Aleksandr Filipenko.

== Orbit and classification ==
Filipenko is a dark asteroid that orbits the Sun in the outer main-belt at a distance of 2.5–3.8 AU once every 5 years and 8 months (2,066 days). Its orbit has an eccentricity of 0.21 and an inclination of 17° with respect to the ecliptic.

First identified as A910 CK at Taunton Observatory (803) in 1910, Filipenko's first used observation was made at the Finnish Turku Observatory in 1953, extending the body's observation arc by 30 years prior to its official discovery observation at Nauchnyj.

== Physical characteristics ==
In the SMASS classification, Filipenko has been classified as a carbonaceous C-type asteroid.

=== Diameter and albedo ===
According to the surveys carried out by the Infrared Astronomical Satellite IRAS, the Japanese Akari satellite and NASA's Wide-field Infrared Survey Explorer with its subsequent NEOWISE mission, Filipenko measures between 56.1 and 69.5 kilometers in diameter and its surface has an albedo between 0.030 and 0.046. The Collaborative Asteroid Lightcurve Link derives an albedo of 0.0426 and a smaller diameter of 56.0 kilometers with an absolute magnitude of 10.3.

=== Rotation period ===
In November 2004, a rotational lightcurve of Filipenko was obtained from photometric observations by Robert D. Stephens at the Santana Observatory (646), California, and gave a well-defined rotation period of 14.00±0.01 hours with a brightness variation of 0.21±0.03 magnitude (U=3).

== Naming ==
This minor planet is named for Aleksandr Filipenko, chief surgeon at the hospital in Bakhchisarai located on the Crimean peninsula. He had saved the life of a friend of the discoverer Lyudmila Karachkina. The official naming citation was published by the Minor Planet Center on 13 July 1984 (M.P.C. 8913).
