= 408 Fama =

Main-belt asteroid

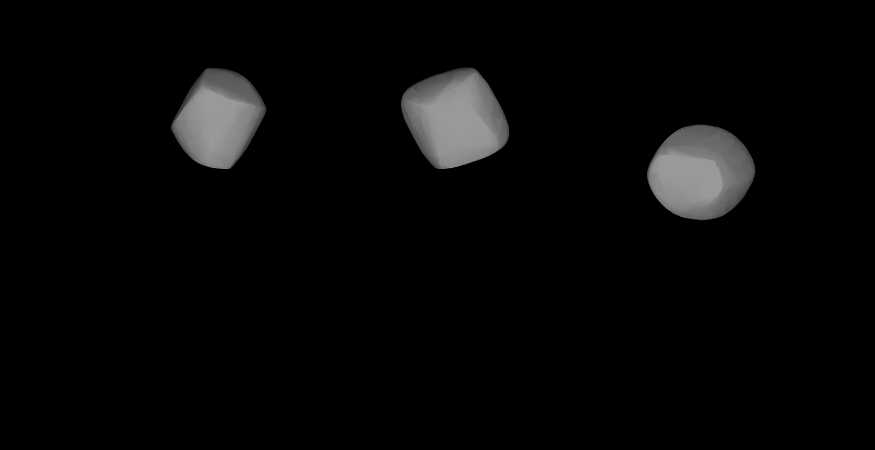
- Lightcurve-base 3D-model of 408 Fama.

Discovery
- Discovered by: Max Wolf
- Discovery date: 13 October 1895

Designations
- Pronunciation: /ˈfeɪmə/
- Alternative designations: 1895 CD
- Minor planet category: Main belt

Orbital characteristics
- Epoch 31 July 2016 (JD 2457600.5)
- Uncertainty parameter 0
- Observation arc: 109.59 yr (40029 d)
- Aphelion: 3.6216 AU (541.78 Gm)
- Perihelion: 2.71757 AU (406.543 Gm)
- Semi-major axis: 3.1696 AU (474.17 Gm)
- Eccentricity: 0.14261
- Orbital period (sidereal): 5.64 yr (2061.1 d)
- Mean anomaly: 148.91°
- Mean motion: 0° 10^{m} 28.776^{s} / day
- Inclination: 9.0794°
- Longitude of ascending node: 297.250°
- Argument of perihelion: 108.505°

Physical characteristics
- Dimensions: 40.81±2.1 km
- Synodic rotation period: 202.1 h (8.42 d); 12.19 h
- Geometric albedo: 0.1681±0.019
- Absolute magnitude (H): 9.3

408 Fama is a typical main belt asteroid in orbit around the Sun. It was discovered by German astronomer Max Wolf on 13 October 1895 in Heidelberg.

Photometric observations at the Oakley Observatory in Terre Haute, Indiana, during 2007 were used to build a light curve for this asteroid. The asteroid displayed a rotation period of 12.19 ± 0.02 hours and a brightness variation of 0.15 ± 0.03 in magnitude.
