= List of named minor planets: P =

This is a partial list of named minor planets, containing all those starting with the letter P, as of 9 November 2026. It is ordered in a case-insensitive, alphabetical manner and contains a total of 1,306 entries. Grey minor planets have no article and redirect to the list of minor planets instead (see List of minor planets § Main index).

== P ==
- 547705 Paálgyörgy
- 1740 Paavo Nurmi
- 26080 Pablomarques
- 554466 Pablomotos
- 25001 Pacheco
- 4972 Pachelbel
- 357106 Pacholka
- 19754 Paclements
- 311119 Pacner
- 11755 Paczyński
- 5191 Paddack
- 15551 Paddock
- 34218 Padiyath
- 21575 Padmanabhan
- 12636 Padrielli
- 363 Padua
- 9700 Paech
- 22180 Paeon
- 1061 Paeonia
- 1032 Pafuri
- 204705 Pagan
- 16110 Paganetti
- 2859 Paganini
- 71556 Page
- 3807 Pagels
- 120040 Pagliarini
- 10306 Pagnol
- 32146 Paigebrown
- 27589 Paigegentry
- 22829 Paigerin
- 30245 Paigesmith
- 1535 Päijänne
- 5188 Paine
- 953 Painleva
- 461650 Paisdezső
- 3636 Pajdušáková
- 12482 Pajka
- 296820 Paju
- 37309 Pajuelo
- 1889 Pakhmutova
- 270903 Pakštienė
- 4233 Palʹchikov
- 1921 Pala
- 1834 Palach
- 17873 Palaciosdeborao
- 40444 Palacký
- 33608 Paladugu
- 2066 Palala
- 2456 Palamedes
- 166229 Palanga
- 21715 Palaniappan
- 415 Palatia
- 19968 Palazzolascaris
- 6793 Palazzolo
- 17970 Palepu
- 12128 Palermiti
- 10001 Palermo
- 49 Pales
- 4850 Palestrina
- 192291 Palindrome
- 577881 Pálinkáslibor
- 4832 Palinurus
- 914 Palisana
- 11970 Palitzsch
- 564808 Pallai
- 2 Pallas
- 372 Palma
- 12575 Palmaria
- 16168 Palmen
- 13131 Palmyra
- 58931 Palmys
- 1548 Palomaa
- 1598 Paloque
- 26963 Palorapavý
- 8977 Paludicola
- 38246 Palupín
- 24194 Paľuš
- 2885 Palva
- 313116 Pálvenetianer
- 29148 Palzer
- 5200 Pamal
- 1243 Pamela
- 632484 Pamelagay
- 174515 Pamelaivezić
- 14157 Pamelasobey
- 33249 Pamelasvenson
- 21474 Pamelatsai
- 22432 Pamgriffin
- 539 Pamina
- 4852 Pamjones
- 17077 Pampaloni
- 25951 Pamross
- 4450 Pan
- 2878 Panacea
- 12702 Panamarenko
- 21238 Panarea
- 112527 Panarese
- 29762 Panasiewicz
- 11120 Pancaldi
- 714305 Panceri
- 21716 Panchamia
- 346721 Panchengdong
- 52225 Panchenko
- 25870 Panchovigil
- 20128 Panconrad
- 4028 Pancratz
- 263251 Pandabear
- 2674 Pandarus
- 21284 Pandion
- 300128 Panditjasraj
- 55 Pandora
- 20996 Pandrosion
- 30324 Pandya
- 185150 Panevėžys
- 21717 Pang
- 20575 Panicucci
- 7306 Panizon
- 470341 Panjianwei
- 216331 Panjunhua
- 17075 Pankonin
- 597967 Pannai
- 29764 Panneerselvam
- 2378 Pannekoek
- 17870 Pannett
- 1444 Pannonia
- 70 Panopaea
- 35268 Panoramix
- 10413 Pansecchi
- 30407 Pantano
- 4198 Panthera
- 4754 Panthoos
- 5990 Panticapaeon
- 83956 Panuzzo
- 25566 Panying
- 2973 Paola
- 454350 Paolaamico
- 177659 Paolacel
- 272746 Paoladiomede
- 12840 Paolaferrari
- 12813 Paolapaolini
- 3176 Paolicchi
- 151697 Paolobattaini
- 37313 Paolocampaner
- 33031 Paolofini
- 19523 Paolofrisi
- 270374 Paolomanente
- 20577 Paolomartino
- 194837 Paolomasetti
- 8524 Paoloruffini
- 9715 Paolotanga
- 13150 Paolotesi
- 44715 Paolovezzosi
- 13111 Papacosmas
- 4938 Papadopoulos
- 471 Papagena
- 17063 Papaloizou
- 2480 Papanov
- 541587 Paparó
- 15041 Paperetti
- 5310 Papike
- 4241 Pappalardo
- 175566 Papplaci
- 29448 Pappos
- 234294 Pappsándor
- 37044 Papymarcel
- 15278 Pâquet
- 34854 Paquifrutos
- 2239 Paracelsus
- 2791 Paradise
- 3963 Paradzhanov
- 10071 Paraguay
- 1779 Paraná
- 6836 Paranal
- 604772 Paraschiv
- 5298 Paraskevopoulos
- 534299 Parazynski
- 1857 Parchomenko
- 4914 Pardina
- 259344 Paré
- 2484 Parenago
- 33035 Pareschi
- 7913 Parfenov
- 347 Pariana
- 16174 Parihar
- 5303 Parijskij
- 15988 Parini
- 3317 Paris
- 12506 Pariser
- 15803 Parisi
- 20578 Parisot
- 5392 Parker
- 34737 Parkerjou
- 24397 Parkerowan
- 10041 Parkinson
- 15612 Parkmincheol
- 5585 Parks
- 23286 Parlakgul
- 6550 Parléř
- 6039 Parmenides
- 19287 Paronelli
- 14277 Parsa
- 30857 Parsec
- 2095 Parsifal
- 4087 Pärt
- 30066 Parthakker
- 27244 Parthasarathy
- 31487 Parthchopra
- 11 Parthenope
- 25384 Partizánske
- 19810 Partridge
- 19415 Parvamenon
- 2847 Parvati
- 2331 Parvulesco
- 888 Parysatis
- 2860 Pasacentennium
- 5100 Pasachoff
- 2200 Pasadena
- 3855 Pasasymphonia
- 4500 Pascal
- 24015 Pascalepinner
- 79869 Pascalfouqué
- 11669 Pascalscholl
- 21043 Pascalwillis
- 12766 Paschen
- 24826 Pascoli
- 14885 Paskoff
- 11191 Paskvić
- 21719 Pasricha
- 12670 Passargea
- 16498 Passau
- 9579 Passchendaele
- 3508 Pasternak
- 4804 Pasteur
- 34525 Paszkowski
- 21482 Patashnick
- 48915 Patbrandebourg
- 7511 Patcassen
- 14060 Patersonewen
- 12509 Pathak
- 153686 Pathall
- 451 Patientia
- 12511 Patil
- 23981 Patjohnson
- 348407 Patkósandrás
- 22582 Patmiller
- 34181 Patnaik
- 164518 Patoche
- 2727 Paton
- 30231 Patorojo
- 1347 Patria
- 1978 Patrice
- 436 Patricia
- 77696 Patriciann
- 44167 Patriciaquinn
- 2748 Patrick Gene
- 25225 Patrickbenson
- 23214 Patrickchen
- 39792 Patrickchevalley
- 596687 Patrickcôté
- 730891 Patrickdowler
- 24000 Patrickdufour
- 18009 Patrickgeer
- 24353 Patrickhsu
- 15128 Patrickjones
- 5919 Patrickmartin
- 7561 Patrickmichel
- 4984 Patrickmiller
- 33964 Patrickshober
- 645530 Patrickstewart
- 9286 Patricktaylor
- 316028 Patrickwils
- 17108 Patricorbett
- 617 Patroclus
- 1601 Patry
- 1791 Patsayev
- 3310 Patsy
- 5178 Pattazhy
- 2511 Patterson
- 290180 Pattiekletter
- 58535 Pattillo
- 246789 Pattinson
- 353730 Patton
- 27277 Pattybrown
- 30347 Pattyhunt
- 172937 Pattysieck
- 19826 Patwalker
- 177148 Pätzold
- 333744 Pau
- 3525 Paul
- 5307 Paul-André
- 1314 Paula
- 8139 Paulabell
- 30218 Paulaladd
- 23120 Paulallen
- 65697 Paulandrew
- 6015 Paularego
- 17131 Paulazhu
- 17782 Paulbailey
- 388370 Paulblu
- 25518 Paulcitrin
- 7519 Paulcook
- 8903 Paulcruikshank
- 6870 Pauldavies
- 700818 Pauldelaney
- 10934 Pauldelvaux
- 4443 Paulet
- 333511 Paulfleming
- 85411 Paulflora
- 33517 Paulfoltin
- 14372 Paulgerhardt
- 27288 Paulgilmore
- 23699 Paulgordan
- 20018 Paulgray
- 12947 Paulgroot
- 44192 Paulguttman
- 5349 Paulharris
- 278 Paulina
- 24239 Paulinehiga
- 22649 Paulineloader
- 4674 Pauling
- 37592 Pauljackson
- 3743 Pauljaniczek
- 40917 Pauljorden
- 8326 Paulkling
- 255598 Paullauterbur
- 13525 Paulledoux
- 90526 Paullorenz
- 11848 Paullouka
- 27675 Paulmaley
- 121557 Paulmason
- 864404 Paulmueller
- 153298 Paulmyers
- 197707 Paulnohr
- 128611 Paulnowak
- 28551 Paulomi
- 23059 Paulpaino
- 11392 Paulpeeters
- 7386 Paulpellas
- 24217 Paulroeder
- 181562 Paulrosendall
- 165067 Pauls
- 20882 Paulsánchez
- 45305 Paulscherrer
- 310273 Paulsmeyers
- 12229 Paulsson
- 26493 Paulsucala
- 12443 Paulsydney
- 50687 Paultemple
- 131186 Pauluckas
- 12647 Pauluspotter
- 6226 Paulwarren
- 537 Pauly
- 16479 Paulze
- 611980 Pauquachin
- 5269 Paustovskij
- 12761 Pauwels
- 18123 Pavan
- 5203 Pavarotti
- 16810 Pavelaleksandrov
- 36184 Pavelbožek
- 21471 Pavelchvykov
- 669448 Pavelgabor
- 33040 Pavelmayer
- 59470 Paveltoufar
- 20579 Pavelzigo
- 16274 Pavlica
- 287875 Pavlokorsun
- 7008 Pavlov
- 179877 Pavlovski
- 20588 Pavolmatlovič
- 336680 Pavolpaulík
- 315166 Pawelmaksym
- 1007 Pawlowia
- 1152 Pawona
- 679 Pax
- 14574 Payette
- 20592 Payne
- 2039 Payne-Gaposchkin
- 33610 Payra
- 238593 Paysdegex
- 85386 Payton
- 23006 Pazden
- 12123 Pazin
- 581587 Pazmany
- 669588 Pazura
- 333245 Peachey
- 18727 Peacock
- 14595 Peaker
- 3612 Peale
- 9987 Peano
- 3304 Pearce
- 29458 Pearson
- 103560 Peate
- 268242 Pebble
- 12306 Pebronstein
- 331011 Peccioli
- 43724 Pechstein
- 10474 Pecina
- 20245 Peck
- 1629 Pecker
- 18460 Pecková
- 7531 Pecorelli
- 635338 Pécsieszter
- 544325 Péczbéla
- 3312 Pedersen
- 20454 Pedrajo
- 266710 Pedrettiadriana
- 35623 Pedrodavid
- 24048 Pedroduque
- 32599 Pedromachado
- 31648 Pedrosada
- 249539 Pedrosevilla
- 18242 Peebles
- 9004 Peekaydee
- 292856 Peeters
- 21445 Pegconnolly
- 29701 Peggyhaas
- 11331 Peggynugent
- 9261 Peggythomson
- 5273 Peilisheng
- 12658 Peiraios
- 19226 Peiresc
- 26763 Peirithoos
- 2893 Peiroos
- 248183 Peisandros
- 7107 Peiser
- 118 Peitho
- 40210 Peixinho
- 2045 Peking
- 1190 Pelagia
- 34220 Pelagiamajoni
- 27551 Pelayo
- 6149 Pelčák
- 2202 Pele
- 11311 Peleus
- 333035 Pelgrift
- 7532 Pelhřimov
- 49036 Pelion
- 7433 Pellegrini
- 8535 Pellesvanslös
- 177722 Pelletier
- 1667 Pels
- 8307 Peltan
- 3850 Peltier
- 5856 Peluk
- 16177 Pelzer
- 20594 Pemartin
- 1429 Pemba
- 10219 Penco
- 21059 Penderecki
- 33613 Pendharkar
- 7165 Pendleton
- 22542 Pendri
- 13181 Peneleos
- 201 Penelope
- 239071 Penghu
- 48798 Penghuanwu
- 192510 Pengkunchi
- 179593 Penglangxiaoxue
- 14134 Penkala
- 20455 Pennell
- 12227 Penney
- 48801 Penninger
- 10231 Penrose
- 271 Penthesilea
- 34258 Pentland
- 15224 Penttilä
- 3189 Penza
- 19022 Penzel
- 171458 Pepaprats
- 15501 Pepawlowski
- 13476 Pepesales
- 10634 Pepibican
- 10919 Pepíkzicha
- 448051 Pepisensi
- 1102 Pepita
- 257439 Peppeprosperini
- 18022 Pepper
- 11043 Pepping
- 204702 Péquignat
- 1680 Per Brahe
- 801684 Pera
- 554 Peraga
- 158623 Perali
- 5622 Percyjulian
- 8758 Perdix
- 2817 Perec
- 22434 Peredery
- 6620 Peregrina
- 547508 Perehorts
- 30054 Pereira
- 50033 Perelman
- 2951 Perepadin
- 37777 Pérez-Reverte
- 7622 Pergolesi
- 12929 Periboea
- 210874 Perijohnson
- 21499 Perillat
- 13650 Perimedes
- 7556 Perinaldo
- 15663 Periphas
- 2482 Perkin
- 333546 Perkins
- 17222 Perlmutter
- 43767 Permeke
- 7989 Pernadavide
- 4043 Perolof
- 8230 Perona
- 12222 Perotto
- 2422 Perovskaya
- 10027 Perozzi
- 560085 Perperikon
- 14278 Perrenot
- 100596 Perrett
- 6779 Perrine
- 1515 Perrotin
- 5529 Perry
- 10969 Perryman
- 26593 Perrypat
- 9637 Perryrose
- 11081 Persäve
- 399 Persephone
- 975 Perseverantia
- 69245 Persiceto
- 9275 Persson
- 3953 Perth
- 12465 Perth Amboy
- 33157 Pertile
- 10866 Peru
- 32570 Peruindiana
- 4250 Perun
- 3005 Pervictoralex
- 9399 Pesch
- 11444 Peshekhonov
- 11263 Pesonen
- 374354 Pesquet
- 6817 Pest
- 21682 Peštafrantišek
- 2970 Pestalozzi
- 23011 Petach
- 3745 Petaev
- 100016 Petebest
- 21640 Petekirkland
- 25710 Petelandgren
- 1716 Peter
- 128022 Peterantreasian
- 20068 Peterbarthel
- 365739 Peterbecker
- 10331 Peterbluhm
- 19551 Peterborden
- 785630 Peterbrandt
- 24200 Peterbrooks
- 16217 Peterbroughton
- 12397 Peterbrown
- 30724 Peterburgtrista
- 10467 Peterbus
- 4507 Petercollins
- 20468 Petercook
- 243529 Petereisenhardt
- 8160 Petererwin
- 231307 Peterfalk
- 24997 Petergabriel
- 8280 Petergruber
- 58217 Peterhebel
- 10073 Peterhiscocks
- 65213 Peterhobbs
- 13923 Peterhof
- 25931 Peterhu
- 212392 Peterkollmann
- 28570 Peterkraft
- 32428 Peterlangley
- 12097 Peterlowen
- 262972 Petermansfield
- 24333 Petermassey
- 13154 Petermrva
- 123120 Peternewman
- 4115 Peternorton
- 9269 Peterolufemi
- 84075 Peterpatricia
- 34420 Peterpau
- 28787 Peterpinko
- 19175 Peterpiot
- 464745 Péterrózsa
- 100007 Peters
- 150118 Petersberg
- 9207 Petersmith
- 5833 Peterson
- 8086 Peterthomas
- 43804 Peterting
- 75009 Petervereš
- 10662 Peterwisse
- 128323 Peterwolff
- 16952 Peteschultz
- 21473 Petesullivan
- 17799 Petewilliams
- 31416 Peteworden
- 348383 Petibon
- 223566 Petignat
- 145768 Petiška
- 7740 Petit
- 4483 Petöfi
- 3492 Petra-Pepi
- 696315 Petraios
- 12722 Petrarca
- 9449 Petrbondy
- 33809 Petrescu
- 113210 Petrfatka
- 50413 Petrginz
- 21476 Petrie
- 482 Petrina
- 651168 Petrini
- 16801 Petřínpragensis
- 10170 Petrjakeš
- 20025 Petronaviera
- 3244 Petronius
- 830 Petropolitana
- 4785 Petrov
- 9545 Petrovedomosti
- 3017 Petrovič
- 5319 Petrovskaya
- 8805 Petrpetrov
- 11463 Petrpokorny
- 4790 Petrpravec
- 274981 Petrsu
- 566939 Petrucrăciun
- 20225 Petrunin
- 9707 Petruskoning
- 36035 Petrvok
- 21087 Petsimpallas
- 7258 Pettarin
- 3831 Pettengill
- 15414 Pettirossi
- 968 Petunia
- 3716 Petzval
- 12681 Pevear
- 7314 Pevsner
- 2944 Peyo
- 11636 Pezinok
- 39641 Pézy
- 29491 Pfaff
- 20596 Pfalzner
- 9962 Pfau
- 25972 Pfefferjosh
- 12774 Pfund
- 174 Phaedra
- 181751 Phaenops
- 322 Phaeo
- 3200 Phaethon
- 296 Phaëtusa
- 20051 Phanostrate
- 361707 Pharmauni
- 332632 Pharos
- 14588 Pharrams
- 30704 Phegeus
- 23135 Pheidas
- 42585 Pheidippides
- 17351 Pheidippos
- 13433 Phelps
- 10664 Phemios
- 51570 Phendricksen
- 2357 Phereclos
- 4753 Phidias
- 24663 Philae
- 274 Philagoria
- 69261 Philaret
- 6580 Philbland
- 90388 Philchristensen
- 4448 Phildavis
- 20270 Phildeutsch
- 89131 Phildevries
- 17797 Philfrankel
- 181627 Philgeluck
- 188809 Philgroves
- 22001 Philharrington
- 280 Philia
- 11581 Philipdejager
- 128321 Philipdumont
- 100417 Philipglass
- 8615 Philipgrahamgood
- 20208 Philiphe
- 30386 Philipjeffery
- 283455 Philipkrider
- 24144 Philipmocz
- 20796 Philipmunoz
- 977 Philippa
- 74944 Philippeamram
- 74080 Philippestée
- 578202 Philippetalbot
- 631 Philippina
- 731678 Philippschäfer
- 10030 Philkeenan
- 5133 Phillipadams
- 120368 Phillipcoulter
- 175450 Phillipklu
- 78383 Philmassey
- 36329 Philmetzger
- 7220 Philnicholson
- 52309 Philnicolai
- 1869 Philoctetes
- 196 Philomela
- 227 Philosophia
- 165347 Philplait
- 38641 Philpott
- 30426 Philtalbot
- 5260 Philvéron
- 22446 Philwhitney
- 46793 Phinney
- 25 Phocaea
- 15510 Phoeberounds
- 4543 Phoinix
- 5145 Pholus
- 443 Photographica
- 1291 Phryne
- 189 Phthia
- 39463 Phyleus
- 556 Phyllis
- 627939 Phyllisthornton
- 85158 Phyllistrapp
- 4185 Phystech
- 614 Pia
- 3772 Piaf
- 10573 Piani
- 26917 Pianoro
- 100897 Piatra Neamt
- 126161 Piazzano
- 1000 Piazzia
- 9714 Piazzismyth
- 12102 Piazzolla
- 20488 Pic-du-Midi
- 12540 Picander
- 178008 Picard
- 402852 Picardie
- 4221 Picasso
- 147693 Piccioni
- 30409 Piccirillo
- 1366 Piccolo
- 274264 Piccolomini
- 12051 Pícha
- 48451 Pichincha
- 803 Picka
- 5716 Pickard
- 784 Pickeringia
- 20597 Pickersgill
- 12398 Pickhardt
- 117874 Picodelteide
- 11912 Piedade
- 75996 Piekiel
- 1523 Pieksämäki
- 1536 Pielinen
- 5162 Piemonte
- 2816 Pien
- 108953 Pieraerts
- 15339 Pierazzo
- 22435 Pierfederici
- 7061 Pieri
- 678471 Piermichelbergé
- 7197 Pieroangela
- 5727 Pierobenvenuti
- 17556 Pierofrancesca
- 46720 Pierostroppa
- 11401 Pierralba
- 1392 Pierre
- 28809 Pierrebeck
- 13602 Pierreboulez
- 59068 Pierrebourget
- 97509 Pierrehaenecour
- 65696 Pierrehenry
- 175736 Pierreléna
- 218268 Pierremariepelé
- 59964 Pierremartin
- 727524 Pierrepaquette
- 19353 Pierrethierry
- 312 Pierretta
- 6018 Pierssac
- 4573 Piešťany
- 274472 Pietà
- 224206 Pietchisson
- 3713 Pieters
- 17031 Piethut
- 10655 Pietkeyser
- 78948 Pietrasanta
- 212373 Pietrocascella
- 836275 Pietromaffi
- 372573 Pietromenga
- 73891 Pietromennea
- 6659 Pietsch
- 52558 Pigafetta
- 89664 Pignata
- 22263 Pignedoli
- 10220 Pigott
- 10066 Pihack
- 3759 Piironen
- 52524 Pikador
- 1975 Pikelner
- 21355 Pikovskaya
- 4174 Pikulia
- 17025 Pilachowski
- 20598 Pilat-Lohinger
- 1990 Pilcher
- 562446 Pilinszky
- 21720 Pilishvili
- 15614 Pillinger
- 4368 Pillmore
- 18293 Pilyugin
- 19456 Pimdouglas
- 112339 Pimpa
- 184501 Pimprenelle
- 6521 Pina
- 20352 Pinakibose
- 134346 Pinatubo
- 30577 Pinchuk
- 5928 Pindarus
- 166745 Pindor
- 19497 Pineda
- 12095 Pinel
- 10198 Pinelli
- 18111 Pinet
- 34014 Pingali
- 6790 Pingouin
- 12719 Pingré
- 92209 Pingtang
- 175583 Pingtung
- 7976 Pinigin
- 10689 Pinillaalonso
- 19367 Pink Floyd
- 19419 Pinkham
- 178603 Pinkine
- 14678 Pinney
- 2694 Pino Torinese
- 12927 Pinocchio
- 4627 Pinomogavero
- 12470 Pinotti
- 8580 Pinsky
- 3445 Pinson
- 26792 Pintado
- 33103 Pintar
- 296987 Piotrflin
- 701424 Piotrguzik
- 15597 Piotrlazarek
- 4869 Piotrovsky
- 440411 Piovani
- 306128 Pipher
- 648 Pippa
- 184620 Pippobattaglia
- 178679 Piquette
- 12369 Pirandello
- 11336 Piranesi
- 3228 Pire
- 79864 Pirituba
- 22105 Pirko
- 2506 Pirogov
- 1082 Pirola
- 100445 Pisa
- 59797 Píšala
- 7313 Pisano
- 20599 Pisarčíková
- 20963 Pisarenko
- 2672 Písek
- 18623 Pises
- 9056 Piskunov
- 11240 Piso
- 30414 Pistacchi
- 210107 Pistoletto
- 8051 Pistoria
- 37432 Piszkéstető
- 450390 Pitchcomment
- 11359 Piteglio
- 17832 Pitman
- 48785 Pitter
- 5768 Pittich
- 9306 Pittosporum
- 484 Pittsburghia
- 12994 Pitufo
- 19182 Pitz
- 157456 Pivatte
- 273273 Piwowarski
- 16466 Piyashiriyama
- 31465 Piyasiri
- 4609 Pizarro
- 7377 Pizzarello
- 233559 Pizzetti
- 33187 Pizzolato
- 6121 Plachinda
- 10648 Plancius
- 1069 Planckia
- 322390 Planes de Son
- 2639 Planman
- 10668 Plansos
- 46719 Plantade
- 6808 Plantin
- 2905 Plaskett
- 9309 Platanus
- 9158 Platè
- 11966 Plateau
- 5451 Plato
- 3620 Platonov
- 11808 Platz
- 2179 Platzeck
- 1986 Plaut
- 6076 Plavec
- 2172 Plavsk
- 14479 Plekhanov
- 5999 Plescia
- 16358 Plesetsk
- 32105 Plesko
- 4229 Plevitskaya
- 11524 Pleyel
- 7932 Plimpton
- 3226 Plinius
- 4626 Plisetskaya
- 12246 Pliska
- 9535 Plitchenko
- 6616 Plotinos
- 14619 Plotkin
- 3860 Plovdiv
- 29643 Plücker
- 134160 Pluis
- 574548 Plume
- 333561 Plummer
- 144752 Plungė
- 6615 Plutarchos
- 134340 Pluto
- 2613 Plzeň
- 1908 Pobeda
- 4487 Pocahontas
- 14974 Počátky
- 3441 Pochaina
- 12823 Pochintesta
- 801371 Pocora
- 191775 Poczobut
- 4086 Podalirius
- 13062 Podarkes
- 42849 Podjavorinská
- 32261 Podlewskagaca
- 117712 Podmaniczky
- 3311 Podobed
- 36174 Podolský
- 7455 Podosek
- 17427 Poe
- 264165 Poehler
- 10348 Poelchau
- 19141 Poelkapelle
- 10982 Poerink
- 946 Poësia
- 39864 Poggiali
- 56073 Poggianti
- 547779 Pogo
- 19919 Pogorelov
- 4468 Pogrebetskij
- 1830 Pogson
- 3606 Pohjola
- 12284 Pohl
- 27328 Pohlonski
- 2021 Poincaré
- 12286 Poiseuille
- 12874 Poisson
- 10205 Pokorný
- 17208 Pokrovska
- 3348 Pokryshkin
- 4078 Polakis
- 142 Polana
- 9025 Polanskey
- 8066 Poldimeri
- 4940 Polenov
- 21584 Polepeddi
- 24847 Polesný
- 4562 Poleungkuk
- 193818 Polidoro
- 4780 Polina
- 21432 Polingloh
- 13151 Polino
- 72447 Polińska
- 8464 Polishook
- 1708 Pólit
- 4867 Polites
- 31888 Polizzi
- 12168 Polko
- 5226 Pollack
- 210435 Pollackmihály
- 7448 Pöllath
- 17217 Pollner
- 5800 Pollock
- 5278 Polly
- 21585 Polmear
- 99824 Polnareff
- 1112 Polonia
- 22469 Poloniny
- 2006 Polonskaya
- 2983 Poltava
- 29646 Polya
- 4619 Polyakhova
- 6174 Polybius
- 189310 Polydamas
- 4708 Polydoros
- 33 Polyhymnia
- 5982 Polykletus
- 15094 Polymele
- 20947 Polyneikes
- 81203 Polynesia
- 216462 Polyphontes
- 3709 Polypoites
- 14312 Polytech
- 595 Polyxena
- 22227 Polyxenos
- 308 Polyxo
- 2771 Polzunov
- 235027 Pommard
- 32 Pomona
- 203 Pompeja
- 345763 Pompiere
- 29647 Poncelet
- 13117 Pondicherry
- 1305 Pongola
- 2792 Ponomarev
- 9609 Ponomarevalya
- 7332 Ponrepo
- 7645 Pons
- 10433 Ponsen
- 13197 Pontecorvo
- 18928 Pontremoli
- 4166 Pontryagin
- 220444 Pontusbrandt
- 627981 Ponzoni
- 17003 Poojanpandya
- 26389 Poojarambhia
- 13227 Poor
- 10216 Popastro
- 11090 Popelin
- 22281 Popescu
- 177982 Popilnia
- 267585 Popluhár
- 37471 Popocatépetl
- 3074 Popov
- 8444 Popovich
- 365761 Popovici
- 39464 Pöppelmann
- 355657 Poppy
- 8647 Populus
- 7231 Porco
- 3896 Pordenone
- 9429 Poreč
- 1499 Pori
- 28418 Pornwasu
- 2570 Porphyro
- 84902 Porrentruy
- 3276 Porta Coeli
- 21580 Portalatin
- 12946 Portegieszwart
- 32607 Portell
- 1636 Porter
- 33473 Porterfield
- 2333 Porthan
- 229737 Porthos
- 154493 Portisch
- 757 Portlandia
- 10333 Portnoff
- 29772 Portocarrero
- 549873 Portsevskii
- 3933 Portugal
- 7900 Portule
- 6311 Porubčan
- 1757 Porvoo
- 8759 Porzana
- 1131 Porzia
- 32821 Posch
- 4341 Poseidon
- 13129 Poseidonios
- 31836 Poshedly
- 45692 Poshyachinda
- 88875 Posky
- 1572 Posnania
- 312676 Posner
- 316709 POSS
- 507490 Possum
- 89903 Post
- 11184 Postma
- 1484 Postrema
- 178796 Posztoczky
- 9915 Potanin
- 13480 Potapov
- 88705 Potato
- 6954 Potemkin
- 18729 Potentino
- 18830 Pothier
- 1345 Potomac
- 13037 Potosi
- 5816 Potsdam
- 10431 Pottasch
- 7320 Potter
- 256699 Poudai
- 7758 Poulanderson
- 19250 Poullain
- 4348 Poulydamas
- 4281 Pounds
- 14019 Pourbus
- 21586 Pourkaviani
- 3760 Poutanen
- 14829 Povalyaeva
- 12753 Povenmire
- 37141 Povolný
- 9739 Powell
- 11063 Poynting
- 7979 Pozharskij
- 584311 Pozhlakov
- 96765 Poznańuni
- 724932 Pozniakas
- 667514 Pozonuñez
- 420356 Praamžius
- 21928 Prabakaran
- 13232 Prabhakar
- 23681 Prabhu
- 15890 Prachatice
- 7869 Pradun
- 4889 Praetorius
- 2367 Praha
- 635771 Prahácsmargit
- 20064 Prahladagrawal
- 45687 Pranverahyseni
- 34012 Prashaant
- 3164 Prast
- 127005 Pratchett
- 33397 Prathiknaidu
- 34380 Pratikvangal
- 8973 Pratincola
- 18116 Prato
- 12206 Prats
- 185020 Pratte
- 6560 Pravdo
- 34363 Prawira
- 547 Praxedis
- 5983 Praxiteles
- 16034 Prechoudhary
- 1238 Predappia
- 690923 Predatu
- 25814 Preesinghal
- 30029 Preetikakani
- 2896 Preiss
- 11855 Preller
- 12937 Premadi
- 30327 Prembabu
- 23924 Premt
- 7695 Přemysl
- 20581 Prendergast
- 19637 Presbrey
- 59419 Prešov
- 24779 Presque Isle
- 13682 Pressberger
- 591396 Presser
- 20433 Prestinenza
- 3792 Preston
- 126445 Prestonreeves
- 333531 Prestonsherman
- 790 Pretoria
- 162937 Prêtre
- 24994 Prettyman
- 11810 Preusker
- 5628 Preussen
- 18624 Prévert
- 329935 Prévôt
- 6157 Prey
- 25477 Preyashah
- 15506 Preygel
- 529 Preziosa
- 8881 Prialnik
- 884 Priamus
- 10293 Pribina
- 9884 Příbram
- 26703 Price
- 446957 Priellekornélia
- 1359 Prieska
- 5577 Priestley
- 46731 Prieurblanc
- 11964 Prigogine
- 40410 Příhoda
- 6467 Prilepina
- 7919 Prime
- 4545 Primolevi
- 970 Primula
- 508 Princetonia
- 2653 Principia
- 4595 Prinz
- 171171 Prior
- 2137 Priscilla
- 78252 Priscio
- 13653 Priscus
- 9539 Prishvin
- 997 Priska
- 1192 Prisma
- 21702 Prisymendoza
- 60622 Pritchet
- 17519 Pritsak
- 222812 Priyadharmavaram
- 26455 Priyamshah
- 33580 Priyankajain
- 902 Probitas
- 14024 Procol Harum
- 6162 Prokhorov
- 194 Prokne
- 3159 Prokofʹev
- 6172 Prokofeana
- 6681 Prokopovich
- 173117 Promachus
- 1809 Prometheus
- 4315 Pronik
- 134146 Pronoybiswas
- 26 Proserpina
- 2372 Proskurin
- 7292 Prosperin
- 9313 Protea
- 3540 Protesilaos
- 95760 Protezionecivile
- 22203 Prothoenor
- 12444 Prothoon
- 171433 Prothous
- 22278 Protitch
- 147 Protogeneia
- 9529 Protopapa
- 52228 Protos
- 18201 Proudfoot
- 4474 Proust
- 474 Prudentia
- 12980 Pruetz
- 32892 Prufrock
- 113256 Prüm
- 10707 Prunariu
- 5932 Prutkov
- 12210 Prykull
- 7543 Prylis
- 14624 Prymachenko
- 261 Prymno
- 3059 Pryor
- 110627 Psaltis
- 21389 Pshenichka
- 15669 Pshenichner
- 10711 Pskov
- 16 Psyche
- 5011 Ptah
- 769584 Pteancu
- 4001 Ptolemaeus
- 7988 Pucacco
- 4579 Puccini
- 11105 Puchnarová
- 155138 Pučinskas
- 32096 Puckett
- 39571 Pückler
- 515812 Pueo
- 228180 Puertollano
- 36994 Pugel
- 70446 Pugh
- 168261 Puglia
- 8763 Pugnax
- 4516 Pugovkin
- 347017 Pui-Hin
- 77138 Puiching
- 252470 Puigmarti
- 2841 Puijo
- 110077 Pujiquanshan
- 90944 Pujol
- 24317 Pukarhamal
- 22880 Pulaski
- 762 Pulcova
- 66843 Pulido
- 12519 Pullen
- 10493 Pulliah
- 241192 Pulyny
- 1209 Pumma
- 115801 Punahou
- 1659 Punkaharju
- 7270 Punkin
- 18617 Puntel
- 57868 Pupin
- 25973 Puranik
- 3359 Purcari
- 4040 Purcell
- 5341 Purgathofer
- 13063 Purifoy
- 3701 Purkyně
- 3494 Purple Mountain
- 8585 Purpurea
- 101722 Pursell
- 32063 Pusapaty
- 24026 Pusateri
- 2208 Pushkin
- 82656 Puskás
- 11832 Pustylnik
- 7665 Putignano
- 3577 Putilin
- 2557 Putnam
- 23218 Puttachi
- 55331 Putzi
- 295472 Puy
- 2192 Pyatigoriya
- 2122 Pyatiletka
- 6631 Pyatnitskij
- 8590 Pygargus
- 96189 Pygmalion
- 152319 Pynchon
- 2720 Pyotr Pervyj
- 15977 Pyraechmes
- 14871 Pyramus
- 632 Pyrrha
- 5283 Pyrrhus
- 6143 Pythagoras
- 22283 Pytheas
- 432 Pythia
- 9431 Pytho
back to top

== See also ==
- List of minor planet discoverers
- List of observatory codes
- Meanings of minor planet names § Index
