= 1107 Lictoria =

Hygiea asteroid

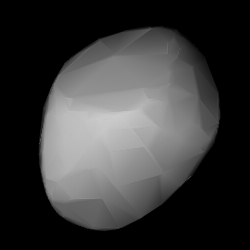
- Shape model of Lictoria from its lightcurve

Discovery
- Discovered by: L. Volta
- Discovery site: Pino Torinese Obs.
- Discovery date: 30 March 1929

Designations
- Named after: Fasces Lictores (Symbol of fascism)
- Alternative designations: 1929 FB · A909 UB; A917 DF · A924 KC
- Minor planet category: main-belt · (outer); Hygiea

Orbital characteristics
- Epoch 23 March 2018 (JD 2458200.5)
- Uncertainty parameter 0
- Observation arc: 108.28 yr (39,549 days)
- Aphelion: 3.5809 AU
- Perihelion: 2.7885 AU
- Semi-major axis: 3.1847 AU
- Eccentricity: 0.1244
- Orbital period (sidereal): 5.68 yr (2,076 days)
- Mean anomaly: 312.44°
- Mean motion: 0° 10^{m} 24.24^{s} / day
- Inclination: 7.0735°
- Longitude of ascending node: 110.84°
- Argument of perihelion: 351.35°

Physical characteristics
- Mean diameter: 69.93±25.12 km 78.86 km (derived); 79.079±0.298 km 79.17±2.9 km 80.73±0.96 km 86.724±1.421 km
- Mass: (9.4±4.0)×10^{17} kg (Note: Calculated from its standard gravitational parameter GM = 0.063±0.027 km^{3}/s^{2}.)
- Mean density: 3.65 g/cm^{3} (Note: Assuming a diameter of 79.1 km.)
- Synodic rotation period: 8.56 h (Note: Koff (2011) web: rotation period 8.56 hours with a brightness amplitude of 0.25 mag. Quality code of 2. Summary figures for (1107) Lictoria at LCDB); 8.561 h (Note: Anonymous Observer at CALL (2011): rotation period 8.561 hours with a brightness amplitude of 0.30 mag. Quality code of 2. Summary figures for (1107) Lictoria at LCDB) (Note: Lightcurve plot of (1107) Lictoria (period of 8.5610; amplitude of 0.19), by William Koff at the Antelope Hills Observatory (H09)); 8.5616±0.0002 h 8.5681±0.0001 h (Note: Hamanowa (2011) web: rotation period 8.5681±0.0001 hours with a brightness amplitude of 0.26±0.01 mag. Quality code of 3. Summary figures for (1107) Lictoria at LCDB); 8.586±0.005 h
- Geometric albedo: 0.0450 (derived); 0.05±0.05; 0.0538±0.0162; 0.063±0.002; 0.0646±0.005; 0.066±0.012
- Spectral type: SMASS = X c · P
- Absolute magnitude (H): 9.10 · 9.50 · 9.6

1107 Lictoria (prov. designation: 1929 FB) is a large Hygiea asteroid, approximately 79 kilometers (49 miles) in diameter, from the outer regions of the asteroid belt. It was discovered by Luigi Volta at the Pino Torinese Observatory in 1929, and named after the Fasces Lictores, Latin for "Fasci Littori", the symbol of the Italian fascist party.

== Discovery ==
Lictoria as first observed as A909 UB at Heidelberg Observatory on 17 October 1909. It was officially discovered on 30 March 1929, by Italian astronomer Luigi Volta at the Observatory of Turin near Pino Torinese, Italy. Three weeks later, on 17 March 1929, it was independently discovered by astronomer Karl Reinmuth at Heidelberg, Germany. The Minor Planet Center only acknowledges the first discoverer.

== Orbit and classification ==
This asteroid is a member of the Hygiea family (601), a very large family of carbonaceous outer-belt asteroids, named after the fourth-largest asteroid, 10 Hygiea. It orbits the Sun in the outer asteroid belt at a distance of 2.8–3.6 AU once every 5 years and 8 months (2,076 days; semi-major axis of 3.18 AU). Its orbit has an eccentricity of 0.12 and an inclination of 7° with respect to the ecliptic. The body's observation arc begins with its first observation as A909 UB at Heidelberg in October 1909.

== Naming ==
This minor planet was named after the symbol of fascism used by the Italian Fascist Party. The symbol was called "Fasci Littori", or "Fasces Lictores" in Latin (derived from fasces and lictor). Several other things such as festivals (littoriali) and fast trains (littorine) were given related names during the fascist period. In particular, the Italian city of Latina was founded under the name "Littoria" in 1932. The author of the Dictionary of Minor Planet Names, Lutz Schmadel, corresponded with Italian-born astronomer Paul Comba to confirm the meaning for this asteroid.

== Physical characteristics ==
In the Bus–Binzel SMASS classification, Lictoria is a Xc-subtype that transitions from the X-type to the carbonaceous C-type asteroids. It has also been characterized as a primitive P-type asteroid by the Wide-field Infrared Survey Explorer (WISE). The Hygiea family's overall spectral type is a mixture of C-type and somewhat brighter B-type asteroids.

=== Rotation period ===
Several rotational lightcurve of Lictoria have been obtained from photometric observations by astronomers William Koff, Eric Barbotin, Stefano Sposetti and Matthieu Conjat, as well as Hiromi and Hiroko Hamanowa (U=2/3/2/2/3). Analysis of the best-rated lightcurve from February 2008 gave a rotation period of 8.5616 hours with a consolidated brightness variation between 0.16 and 0.30 magnitude (U=3).

=== Diameter and albedo ===
According to the surveys carried out by the Infrared Astronomical Satellite IRAS, the Japanese Akari satellite and the NEOWISE mission of NASA's WISE telescope, Lictoria measures between 69.93 and 86.724 kilometers in diameter and its surface has a low albedo between 0.05 and 0.066.

The Collaborative Asteroid Lightcurve Link derives an albedo of 0.045 and a diameter of 78.86 kilometers based on an absolute magnitude of 9.5.
