= 2629 Rudra =

Mars-crossing asteroid

Discovery
- Discovered by: C. Kowal
- Discovery site: Palomar Obs.
- Discovery date: 13 September 1980

Designations
- Named after: Rudra (Hindu mythology)
- Alternative designations: 1980 RB_{1} · 1959 EH
- Minor planet category: Mars-crosser

Orbital characteristics
- Epoch 23 March 2018 (JD 2458200.5)
- Uncertainty parameter 0
- Observation arc: 64.05 yr (23,396 d)
- Aphelion: 2.1390 AU
- Perihelion: 1.3417 AU
- Semi-major axis: 1.7404 AU
- Eccentricity: 0.2290
- Orbital period (sidereal): 2.30 yr (839 d)
- Mean anomaly: 186.56°
- Mean motion: 0° 25^{m} 45.48^{s} / day
- Inclination: 23.440°
- Longitude of ascending node: 343.46°
- Argument of perihelion: 280.67°

Physical characteristics
- Mean diameter: 5.25±0.53 km 6.69±0.49 km
- Synodic rotation period: 123.171±0.4738 h
- Geometric albedo: 0.064
- Spectral type: SMASS = B
- Absolute magnitude (H): 14.50; 15.00

2629 Rudra, provisional designation 1980 RB_{1}, is a sizable Mars-crossing asteroid and slow rotator inside the asteroid belt, approximately 5.3 kilometers (3.3 miles) in diameter. It was discovered on 13 September 1980, by American astronomer Charles Kowal at the Palomar Observatory in California. The dark B-type asteroid has a long rotation period 123 hours and likely an elongated shape. It was named after Rudra from Hindu mythology.

== Orbit and classification ==
Rudra is a Mars-crossing asteroid, a dynamically unstable group between the main belt and the near-Earth populations, crossing the orbit of Mars at 1.66 AU. It orbits the Sun at a distance of 1.3–2.1 AU once every 2 years and 4 months (839 days; semi-major axis of 1.74 AU). Its orbit has an eccentricity of 0.23 and an inclination of 23° with respect to the ecliptic. The body's observation arc begins with its first observation in January 1954, more than 26 years prior to its official discovery observation. The precovery was taken at Palomar Observatory and published by the Digitized Sky Survey. On 15 April 2023 and on 23 July 2179, the asteroid will pass about 0.08 AU (12,000,000 km; 7,400,000 mi) from Mars.

== Naming ==
This minor planet was named after Rudra from Hindu mythology. Rudra is the destroyer aspect of Shiva, and both destroyer and regenerator of all things in the Universe. The asteroid's name was suggested by Frederick Pilcher and published by the Minor Planet Center on 1 June 1996 (M.P.C. 27329).

== Physical characteristics ==
In the SMASS classification, Rudra is an uncommon, carbonaceous B-type asteroid.

=== Rotation period ===
In September 2010, a rotational lightcurve of Rudra was obtained from photometric observations by astronomers at the Palomar Transient Factory in California. Lightcurve analysis gave a rotation period of 123.171±0.4738 hours with a brightness variation of 0.58 magnitude (U=2). Observations by the Wide-field Infrared Survey Explorer (WISE) found a higher brightness amplitude of 0.87 and 0.95, respectively, which indicates that the body has a non-spherical, elongated shape.

=== Diameter and albedo ===
According to the surveys carried out by the NEOWISE mission of NASA's WISE telescope and the Japanese Akari satellite, Rudra measures between 4.73 and 6.69 kilometers in diameter and its surface has an albedo between 0.064 and 0.07, with a recently published diameter of 5.25±0.53 kilometers and an albedo of 0.064. (Note: Various published diameters: Nugent (2016): 4.73±1.31 km; Nugent (2015) and Mainzer (2016): 4.88±1.22 km; Ali-Lagoa (2013/2016): 5±1 km and 5.1±0.5 km; Ali-Lagoa (2017): 5.25±0.53 km; AKARI satellite (2011): 6.69±0.49 km. Summary figures at the LCDB and the JPL-database.) (Note: Various published albedos: AKARI satellite (2011) and Ali-Lagoa (2017): 0.064; Mainzer (2016): 0.066; Nugent (2015): 0.066±0.027; Ali-Lagoa (2013/2016) and Nugent (2015): 0.07. Summary figures for (2629) Rudra at the LCDB and the JPL-database.)

The Collaborative Asteroid Lightcurve Link assumes a standard albedo for a stony asteroid of 0.20 and consequently calculates a smaller diameter of 2.19 kilometers based on an absolute magnitude of 15.67.
