= Hygiea family =

Group of asteroids

The Hygiea or Hygiean family is a grouping of dark, carbonaceous C-type and B-type asteroids in outer asteroid belt, the largest member of which is 10 Hygiea.

== Characteristics ==
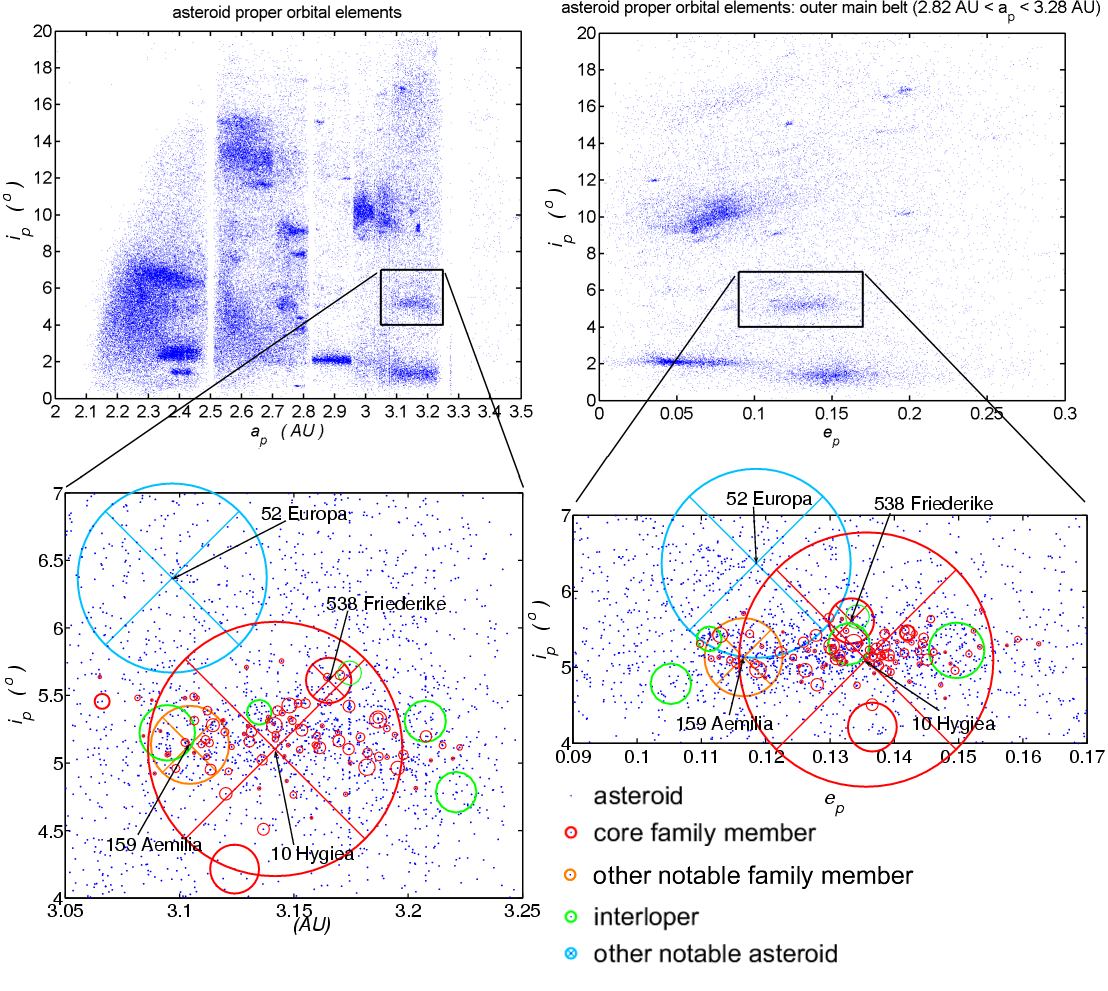
Location and structure of the Hygiea family.

By far the largest member is 10 Hygiea, a 400 km diameter C-type asteroid that is the fourth largest in the belt.. The remaining members are much smaller so Hygiea contains about 94–98% of the mass in the family (depending on the exact criteria for inclusion). The two next largest members are 333 Badenia, and 538 Friederike, both just over 70 km in diameter. After that, the remaining members have diameters of less than 30 km.

The Hygiea family is thought to have arisen from a catastrophically disruptive impact, after which Hygiea re-accumulated. The two 70-kilometer-diameter bodies, which are much larger than, for example, the Vesta family, which contains no members above around 10 km in diameter, are consistent with this scenario.

The family contains a significant number of objects of the otherwise rare B spectral type (Mothé-Diniz 2001). The largest of these is the previously mentioned 538 Friederike.

== Location and size ==
A numerical analysis by Zappala and colleagues found a 'core' group of family members, whose proper orbital elements lie in the approximate ranges

	a_{p}	e_{p}	i_{p}
min	3.06 AU	0.109	4.2°
max	3.22 AU	0.163	5.8°

At the present epoch, the range of osculating orbital elements of these core members is

	a	e	i
min	3.06 AU	0.088	3.5°
max	3.24 AU	0.191	6.8°

The 1995 analysis by Zappalà found 103 core members, whereas a search of a recent proper element database (AstDys)for 96944 minor planets in 2005 yielded 1043 objects lying within the rectangular-shaped region defined by the first table above. This would give about 1% of all asteroids in the asteroid belt.

== Interlopers ==
This family contains quite a large number of identified interlopers. The following were identified in a spectral survey published in 2001, and also by inspection of the PDS asteroid taxonomy data set for S- and D-type members: 100 Hekate, 108 Hecuba, 1109 Tata, 1209 Pumma, and 1599 Giomus.

In fact, some of the other asteroids of the C spectral type are probably interlopers as well, due to the prevalence of this spectral type in the region. Possible candidates include 333 Badenia and 538 Friederike, based on their unusually large size for cratering family members.

52 Europa, a very large 300 km diameter asteroid, orbits nearby with a proper inclination of 6.37°, and was sometimes considered part of the Hygiea family in the past, but it is an unrelated asteroid. A better sampling of asteroids in the area in recent years has clearly shown that it orbits well beyond the Hygiea family clump.
