= 538 Friederike =

Main-belt asteroid

Discovery
- Discovered by: Paul Götz
- Discovery date: 18 July 1904

Designations
- Pronunciation: German: [fʁiːdəˈʁiːkə]
- Alternative designations: 1904 OK
- Minor planet category: Main belt (Hygiea family)

Orbital characteristics
- Epoch 31 July 2016 (JD 2457600.5)
- Uncertainty parameter 0
- Observation arc: 111.70 yr (40800 d)
- Aphelion: 3.6924 AU (552.38 Gm)
- Perihelion: 2.6238 AU (392.51 Gm)
- Semi-major axis: 3.1581 AU (472.45 Gm)
- Eccentricity: 0.16919
- Orbital period (sidereal): 5.61 yr (2049.9 d)
- Mean anomaly: 275.237°
- Mean motion: 0° 10^{m} 32.232^{s} / day
- Inclination: 6.5204°
- Longitude of ascending node: 141.173°
- Argument of perihelion: 227.779°

Physical characteristics
- Mean radius: 36.245±1.15 km 36 km
- Mean density: ~1.4 g/cm^{3}
- Synodic rotation period: 1.1 d 46.728 h (1.9470 d)
- Geometric albedo: 0.0641; 0.0641±0.004
- Spectral type: B-type asteroid
- Absolute magnitude (H): 9.5

538 Friederike is a minor planet (an asteroid specifically) orbiting in the asteroid belt. It is a member of the Hygiea family of asteroids.

Photometric observations at the Organ Mesa Observatory in New Mexico during 2012 showed a rotation period of 46.728 ± 0.004 hours with a brightness variation of 0.25 ± 0.02 in magnitude.
