= Zerlina =

Zerlina may refer to:

- Zerlina Maxwell, American cable television host, political analyst, commentator, speaker, and writer
- Zerlina, role in the opera Don Giovanni
- Asteroid 531 Zerlina
