= 555 Norma =

Asteroid

Discovery
- Discovered by: M. F. Wolf
- Discovery site: Heidelberg Obs.
- Discovery date: 14 January 1905

Designations
- Pronunciation: Italian: [ˈnɔrma]
- Named after: Norma (character in Bellini's opera)
- Alternative designations: 1905 PT · 1928 FS; 1939 BA · 1950 CC; 1954 UH_{2} · 1968 HE_{1}
- Minor planet category: main-belt · (outer) · background

Orbital characteristics
- Epoch 4 September 2017 (JD 2458000.5)
- Uncertainty parameter 0
- Observation arc: 112.20 yr (40,981 days)
- Aphelion: 3.6636 AU
- Perihelion: 2.7105 AU
- Semi-major axis: 3.1870 AU
- Eccentricity: 0.1495
- Orbital period (sidereal): 5.69 yr (2,078 days)
- Mean anomaly: 343.66°
- Mean motion: 0° 10^{m} 23.52^{s} / day
- Inclination: 2.6462°
- Longitude of ascending node: 130.43°
- Argument of perihelion: 356.51°

Physical characteristics
- Dimensions: 27.89±0.68 km 31.040±0.150 km 31.80±0.58 km 32.541±0.215 km 33±3 km 33.0±3.3 km 40.02 km (derived); 40.11±1.5 km
- Synodic rotation period: 19.508±0.002 h 19.55±0.01 h 30.6±0.5 h
- Geometric albedo: 0.0528 (derived); 0.0632±0.005; 0.08±0.02; 0.09±0.02; 0.0962±0.0150; 0.101±0.004; 0.119±0.018
- Spectral type: SMASS = B · B C
- Absolute magnitude (H): 10.37±0.26 · 10.6 · 10.70 · 10.8

555 Norma, provisional designation 1905 PT, is a background asteroid from the outer regions of the asteroid belt, approximately 33 kilometers in diameter. It was discovered on 14 January 1905, by German astronomer Max Wolf at Heidelberg Observatory in southwest Germany. The asteroid was named after the title character of Bellini's opera Norma.

== Classification and orbit ==
Norma is a background asteroid, located near the region occupied by the Themis family, a prominent family of outer-belt asteroids with nearly coplanar ecliptical orbits. It orbits the Sun at a distance of 2.7–3.7 AU once every 5 years and 8 months (2,078 days). Its orbit has an eccentricity of 0.15 and an inclination of 3° with respect to the ecliptic. The body's observation arc begins at Heidelberg in March 1911, more than six years after its official discovery observation.

== Physical characteristics ==
=== Spectral type ===
In the SMASS classification, Norma is a B-type asteroid. These types of asteroids have a featureless surface that displays magnesium-rich silicates, which likely accounts for the relatively high albedo as an outer-belt asteroid. Norma surface consists of more than 50% amorphous magnesium pyroxenes based on data collected with the Subaru Telescope.

=== Photometry ===
In April 2007, a first rotational lightcurve of Norma was obtained from photometric observations by French amateur astronomer Pierre Antonini. Lightcurve analysis gave a rotation period of 30.6 hours with a brightness variation of 0.2 magnitude (U=2). However more recent observations by two American astronomers have since superseded this result.

In December 2011, Robert Stephens at the Santana Observatory (646) obtained a lightcurve that gave a period 19.55 hours and a brightness amplitude of 0.06 magnitude (U=2+), while Frederick Pilcher measured a period of 19.508 hours with an amplitude of 0.25 at the Organ Mesa Observatory (G50) in November 2016.

=== Diameter and albedo ===
According to the surveys carried out by the Infrared Astronomical Satellite IRAS, the Japanese Akari satellite, and NASA's Wide-field Infrared Survey Explorer with its subsequent NEOWISE mission, Norma measures between 27.89 and 40.11 kilometers in diameter and its surface has an albedo of between 0.063 and 0.119.

The Collaborative Asteroid Lightcurve Link (CALL) agrees with IRAS, and derives an albedo of 0.0528 and a diameter of 40.02 kilometers based on an absolute magnitude of 10.8. CALL also assumes Norma to be a C-type asteroid (rather than a B-type) due to its derived low albedo and the general spectral type of the Themis family.

== Naming ==
This minor planet was named for the principal female character of the opera Norma by Italian composer Vincenzo Bellini (1801–1835). In the opera, Norma is a high priestess of the Druids. In 1955, the official naming citation was published by Paul Herget in The Names of the Minor Planets (H 59)
