= 1061 Paeonia =

Main-belt asteroid

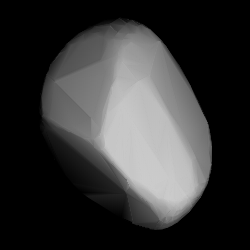
- Modelled shape of Paeonia from its lightcurve

Discovery
- Discovered by: K. Reinmuth
- Discovery site: Heidelberg Obs.
- Discovery date: 10 October 1925

Designations
- Pronunciation: /piːˈoʊniə/
- Named after: peony (flowering plant)
- Alternative designations: 1925 TB · 1925 XB; 1936 SM · 1942 XD
- Minor planet category: main-belt · (outer); Themis · background

Orbital characteristics
- Epoch 23 March 2018 (JD 2458200.5)
- Uncertainty parameter 0
- Observation arc: 91.72 yr (33,502 d)
- Aphelion: 3.7986 AU
- Perihelion: 2.4505 AU
- Semi-major axis: 3.1245 AU
- Eccentricity: 0.2157
- Orbital period (sidereal): 5.52 yr (2,017 d)
- Mean anomaly: 249.51°
- Mean motion: 0° 10^{m} 42.6^{s} / day
- Inclination: 2.4993°
- Longitude of ascending node: 90.923°
- Argument of perihelion: 306.27°

Physical characteristics
- Mean diameter: 17.95 km (calculated); 18.63±5.52 km 23.092±0.151 km
- Synodic rotation period: 6 h (at least); 7.9971±0.0001 h (Note: Pilcher (2014) lightcurve plot of (1061) Paeonia period 7.9971±0.0001 hours with a brightness amplitude of 1.00 mag. Observation from 27 November to 29 December 2014. Quality code of n/a. List of Pilcher's lightcurve plots at the ASLC-website.); 7.99710±0.00001 h
- Geometric albedo: 0.048±0.007; 0.0483±0.0070; 0.08 (assumed); 0.09±0.06
- Spectral type: Tholen = C B–V = 0.676; U–B = 0.337
- Absolute magnitude (H): 11.80 · 12.01±0.29; 12.09

1061 Paeonia, provisional designation 1925 TB, is a carbonaceous background asteroid from the outer regions of the asteroid belt, approximately 19 km (12 mi) in diameter. It was discovered on 10 October 1925, by German astronomer Karl Reinmuth at the Heidelberg-Königstuhl State Observatory in Heidelberg, Germany. The C-type asteroid has a rotation period of 8 hours and is likely very elongated. It was named after the flowering plant Paeonia, commonly known as peony.

== Orbit and classification ==
Paeonia is a non-family asteroid of the main belt's background population when applying the hierarchical clustering method to its proper orbital elements. Based on osculating Keplerian orbital elements, the asteroid has also been classified as a member of the Themis family (602), a very large family of carbonaceous asteroids, named after 24 Themis.

It orbits the Sun in the outer asteroid belt at a distance of 2.5–3.8 AU once every 5 years and 6 months (2,017 days; semi-major axis of 3.12 AU). Its orbit has an eccentricity of 0.22 and an inclination of 2° with respect to the ecliptic. The asteroid was first observed at the Simeiz Observatory in September 1925. The body's observation arc begins at Yerkes Observatory in November 1925, or one month after its official discovery observation at Heidelberg.

== Naming ==
This minor planet was named after the genus of flowering plants, Paeonia, which comprises all perennial peony plants. The official naming citation was mentioned in The Names of the Minor Planets by Paul Herget in 1955 (H 101).

=== Reinmuth's flowers ===
Due to his many discoveries, Karl Reinmuth submitted a large list of 66 newly named asteroids in the early 1930s. The list covered his discoveries with numbers between (1009) and (1200). This list also contained a sequence of 28 asteroids, starting with 1054 Forsytia, that were all named after plants, in particular flowering plants (also see list of minor planets named after animals and plants).

== Physical characteristics ==
In the Tholen classification, Paeonia is a common, carbonaceous C-type asteroid, which agrees with the overall spectral type for the Themistians.

=== Rotation period and pole ===
In December 1986, a rotational lightcurve of Paeonia was obtained from photometric observations by American physicist Frederick Pilcher at Illinois College. Lightcurve analysis gave a rotation period of at least 6 hours with a brightness amplitude of 0.5 magnitude (U=2-). Only a lower limit could be determined due to the short observation period. The observer noted that the brightness variation occurred within 2 hours or less. In 2014, Pilcher revisited Paeonia at his Organ Mesa Observatory (G50) and measured a refined period of 7.9971 hours with an amplitude of 1.00 magnitude (U=n.a.), a strong indication for an elongated shape.

A modeled lightcurve using photometric data from the Lowell Photometric Database was published in 2016. It gave an identical sidereal period of 7.9971 hours, as well as a spin axis at (155.0°, −50.0°) in ecliptic coordinates (λ, β).

=== Diameter and albedo ===
According to the survey carried out by the NEOWISE mission of NASA's Wide-field Infrared Survey Explorer, Paeonia measures between 18.63 and 23.092 kilometers in diameter and its surface has an albedo between 0.048 and 0.09. The Collaborative Asteroid Lightcurve Link assumes an albedo of 0.08 and calculates a diameter of 17.95 kilometers based on an absolute magnitude of 12.09.
