= 333 Badenia =

Main-belt asteroid

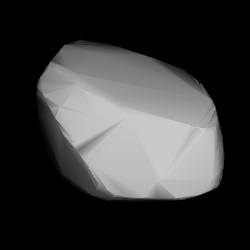
- Modelled shape of Badenia from its lightcurve

Discovery
- Discovered by: M. F. Wolf
- Discovery site: Heidelberg Obs.
- Discovery date: 22 August 1892

Designations
- Pronunciation: /bəˈdiːniə/
- Named after: Grand Duchy of Baden (Großherzogtum Baden)
- Alternative designations: A892 QA · 1930 JD; 1932 TC · 1936 QQ; 1937 VB · 1950 BP_{1} A895 DC · A911 CA; 1892 A
- Minor planet category: main-belt · (outer); background

Orbital characteristics
- Epoch 31 May 2020 (JD 2459000.5)
- Uncertainty parameter 0
- Observation arc: 127.45 yr (46,551 d)
- Aphelion: 3.6300 AU
- Perihelion: 2.6314 AU
- Semi-major axis: 3.1307 AU
- Eccentricity: 0.1595
- Orbital period (sidereal): 5.54 yr (2,023 d)
- Mean anomaly: 20.070°
- Mean motion: 0° 10^{m} 40.44^{s} / day
- Inclination: 3.7393°
- Longitude of ascending node: 353.16°
- Argument of perihelion: 22.785°

Physical characteristics
- Mean diameter: 69.73±2.80 km; 72.199±0.259 km; 78.17±1.9 km
- Mean density: ~1.4 g/cm^{3}
- Synodic rotation period: 9.862±0.001 h
- Geometric albedo: 0.0475; 0.057; 0.061
- Spectral type: Tholen = C: B–V = 0.773±0.028; U–B = 0.401±0.042
- Absolute magnitude (H): 9.4

333 Badenia (/bəˈdiːniə/ bə-DEE-nee-ə; prov. designation: A892 QA or 1892 A) is a large background asteroid, approximately 72 kilometers (45 miles) in diameter, located the outer region of the asteroid belt. It was discovered on 22 August 1892, by astronomer Max Wolf at the Heidelberg-Königstuhl State Observatory in southwest Germany. The carbonaceous C-type asteroid has a rotation period of 9.9 hours. It was named after the historical Grand Duchy of Baden that existed until 1918, and where the discovering observatory is located. Badenia was the first asteroid to receive a provisional designation.

== Orbit and classification ==
Badenia is a non-family asteroid of the main belt's background population when applying the hierarchical clustering method to its proper orbital elements. It orbits the Sun in the outer main-belt at a distance of 2.6–3.6 AU once every 5 years and 6 months (2,023 days; semi-major axis of 3.13 AU). Its orbit has an eccentricity of 0.16 and an inclination of 4° with respect to the ecliptic.

== Physical characteristics ==
In the Tholen classification, Badenia is a common carbonaceous C-type asteroid, though with a nosy spectrum (:).

=== Rotation period ===
In April 2017, a rotational lightcurve of Badenia was obtained from photometric observations by Frederick Pilcher. Lightcurve analysis gave a rotation period of 9.862±0.001 hours with a brightness variation of 0.24±0.02 magnitude (U=3).

=== Diameter and albedo ===
According to the surveys carried out by the Infrared Astronomical Satellite IRAS, the Japanese Akari satellite and the NEOWISE mission of NASA's Wide-field Infrared Survey Explorer, Badenia measures between 64.01 and 78.51 kilometers in diameter and its surface has an albedo between 0.047 and 0.061. The Collaborative Asteroid Lightcurve Link adopts the results from IRAS, that is, an albedo of 0.0475 and a diameter of 78.17 kilometers based on an absolute magnitude of 9.46.
