= 1109 Tata =

Dark Hygiean asteroid

Discovery
- Discovered by: K. Reinmuth
- Discovery site: Heidelberg Obs.
- Discovery date: 5 February 1929

Designations
- Named after: unknown
- Alternative designations: 1929 CU · 1925 QE; 1964 HA
- Minor planet category: main-belt · (outer); Hygiea

Orbital characteristics
- Epoch 23 March 2018 (JD 2458200.5)
- Uncertainty parameter 0
- Observation arc: 88.95 yr (32,489 d)
- Aphelion: 3.5443 AU
- Perihelion: 2.9085 AU
- Semi-major axis: 3.2264 AU
- Eccentricity: 0.0985
- Orbital period (sidereal): 5.80 yr (2,117 d)
- Mean anomaly: 96.944°
- Mean motion: 0° 10^{m} 12.36^{s} / day
- Inclination: 4.1199°
- Longitude of ascending node: 268.08°
- Argument of perihelion: 359.39°

Physical characteristics
- Mean diameter: 61.817±0.265 km 62.39±0.36 km 63.2±12.6 km 64±6 km 65.677±0.810 km 66.49±1.32 km 66.53±1.4 km 69.640±22.05 km 74.94±22.96 km
- Synodic rotation period: 8.277±0.002 h
- Geometric albedo: 0.0378±0.002; 0.038±0.002; 0.0387±0.0080; 0.04±0.01; 0.04±0.02; 0.043±0.010; 0.044±0.005; 0.0485±0.0416
- Spectral type: Tholen = FC · P B–V = 0.604
- Absolute magnitude (H): 9.89 · 9.89±0.27; 10.06

1109 Tata, provisional designation 1929 CU, is a dark Hygiean asteroid from the outer regions of the asteroid belt, approximately 69 kilometers (43 miles) in diameter. It was discovered on 5 February 1929, by German astronomer Karl Reinmuth at the Heidelberg-Königstuhl State Observatory in Germany. The meaning of the asteroids's name is unknown.

== Orbit and classification ==
Tata is a member of the Hygiea family (601), a very large family of carbonaceous outer-belt asteroids. The family's parent body and namesake is the main belt's fourth-largest asteroid, 10 Hygiea. It orbits the Sun in the outer asteroid belt at a distance of 2.9–3.5 AU once every 5 years and 10 months (2,117 days; semi-major axis of 3.23 AU). Its orbit has an eccentricity of 0.10 and an inclination of 4° with respect to the ecliptic.

The asteroid was first observed as 1925 QE at Simeiz Observatory in March 1925. The body's observation arc begins at Heidelberg in March 1929, one month after its official discovery observation.

== Physical characteristics ==
In the Tholen classification, Tata has an ambiguous spectral type, closest to the rare F-types and somewhat similar to the common carbonaceous C-type asteroids. It has also been characterized as a primitive P-type asteroid by the space-based Wide-field Infrared Survey Explorer (WISE).

=== Rotation period ===
In July 2005, a rotational lightcurve of Tata was obtained from photometric observations by French amateur astronomer Laurent Bernasconi. Lightcurve analysis gave a rotation period of 8.277 hours with a low brightness amplitude of 0.06 magnitude (U=2), indicative for a spherical shape. The astronomer also reported that several other period solution could be possible.

=== Diameter and albedo ===
According to the surveys carried out by the Infrared Astronomical Satellite IRAS, the Japanese Akari satellite and the NEOWISE mission of NASA's WISE telescope, Tata measures between 61.817 and 74.94 kilometers in diameter and its surface has an albedo between 0.0378 and 0.0485.

The Collaborative Asteroid Lightcurve Link adopts the results obtained by IRAS, that is, an albedo of 0.0378 and a diameter of 66.53 kilometers based on an absolute magnitude of 10.06.

== Naming ==
Any reference of this minor planet's name to a person or occurrence is unknown.

=== Unknown meaning ===
Among the many thousands of named minor planets, Tata is one of 120 asteroids, for which no official naming citation has been published. All of these asteroids have low numbers between 164 Eva and 1514 Ricouxa and were discovered between 1876 and the 1930s, predominantly by astronomers Auguste Charlois, Johann Palisa, Max Wolf and Karl Reinmuth.
