= 1152 Pawona =

Main-belt asteroid

Discovery
- Discovered by: K. Reinmuth
- Discovery site: Heidelberg Obs.
- Discovery date: 8 January 1930

Designations
- Named after: Johann Palisa and Max Wolf (minor planet discoverers)
- Alternative designations: 1930 AD · 1926 AK; 1942 GE_{1} · 1942 GY; 1969 MD · A924 QA
- Minor planet category: main-belt · Vestian

Orbital characteristics
- Epoch 4 September 2017 (JD 2458000.5)
- Uncertainty parameter 0
- Observation arc: 92.61 yr (33,825 days)
- Aphelion: 2.5288 AU
- Perihelion: 2.3256 AU
- Semi-major axis: 2.4272 AU
- Eccentricity: 0.0419
- Orbital period (sidereal): 3.78 yr (1,381 days)
- Mean anomaly: 356.07°
- Mean motion: 0° 15^{m} 38.16^{s} / day
- Inclination: 5.0797°
- Longitude of ascending node: 331.91°
- Argument of perihelion: 218.56°

Physical characteristics
- Dimensions: 15.69±1.0 km 15.90 km (derived); 16.35±0.31 km 17.130±0.115 km 18.826±0.090 km
- Synodic rotation period: 3.41500±0.00005 h 3.4151±0.0009 h 3.4154±0.0001 h 3.418±0.005 h (Note: Lightcurve plot of (1152) Pawona, Robert Koff, Antelope Hills Observatory (H09). Summary figures at LCDB); 3.425±0.001 h
- Geometric albedo: 0.1529±0.0174; 0.203±0.004; 0.205±0.009; 0.2167±0.030; 0.2782 (derived)
- Spectral type: SMASS = S l · S
- Absolute magnitude (H): 11.0 · 11.18±0.01 · 11.2 · 11.30

1152 Pawona, provisional designation 1930 AD, is a stony Vestian asteroid from the inner regions of the asteroid belt, approximately 16 kilometers in diameter. Discovered by Karl Reinmuth at Heidelberg Observatory in 1930, the asteroid was named in honor of astronomers Johann Palisa and Max Wolf.

== Discovery ==
Pawona was discovered on 8 January 1930, by German astronomer Karl Reinmuth at the Heidelberg-Königstuhl State Observatory in southwest Germany. It was independently discovered by Italian astronomer Luigi Volta at the Observatory of Turin on 19 January 1930, and by Grigory Neujmin at the Simeiz Observatory on the Crimean peninsula on 21 January 1930. The Minor Planet Center, however, only acknowledges the first discoverer.

The asteroid was first identified as A924 QA at Vienna Observatory in August 1924. The body's observation arc begins with its identification as 1926 AK at Heidelberg in January 1926, almost 4 years prior to its official discovery observation.

== Orbit and classification ==
Pawona is a supposed member of the stony Vesta family (401), named after 4 Vesta and the main belt's second-largest asteroid family by number. It orbits the Sun in the inner main-belt at a distance of 2.3–2.5 AU once every 3 years and 9 months (1,381 days). Its orbit has an eccentricity of 0.04 and an inclination of 5° with respect to the ecliptic.

== Physical characteristics ==
In the SMASS classification, Pawona is an Sl-subtype, that transitions from the common stony S-type to the rare L-type asteroids.

=== Rotation period ===
Several rotational lightcurves of Pawona have been obtained from photometric observations since 2002. Analysis of these lightcurves gave a well-defined rotation period between 3.415 and 3.425 hours with a brightness amplitude of 0.16 to 0.26 magnitude (U=3/3/3/3/3).

=== Diameter and albedo ===
According to the surveys carried out by the Infrared Astronomical Satellite IRAS, the Japanese Akari satellite and the NEOWISE mission of NASA's Wide-field Infrared Survey Explorer, Pawona measures between 15.69 and 18.826 kilometers in diameter and its surface has an albedo between 0.1529 and 0.2167.

The Collaborative Asteroid Lightcurve Link derives an albedo of 0.2782 and a diameter of 15.90 kilometers based on an absolute magnitude of 11.0.

== Naming ==
This minor planet was named after astronomers Johann Palisa and Max Wolf, two prolific discoverers of minor planets, in recognition of their cooperation. The name was proposed by Swedish astronomer Bror Ansgar Asplind. The official naming citation was mentioned in The Names of the Minor Planets by Paul Herget in 1955 (H 107).

=== Feminization of names ===
Pawona is a combination of "Palisa" and "Wolf" (Pa, Wo) joined with a Latin feminine suffix. The custom of adding the female endings "a" or "ia" to male names had only faded out by World War II and was finally abolished in 1947, when the Minor Planet Center took over responsibility of numbering and naming asteroids.
