= (523972) 1999 CW8 =

Main-belt asteroid

(523972) 1999 CW_{8}
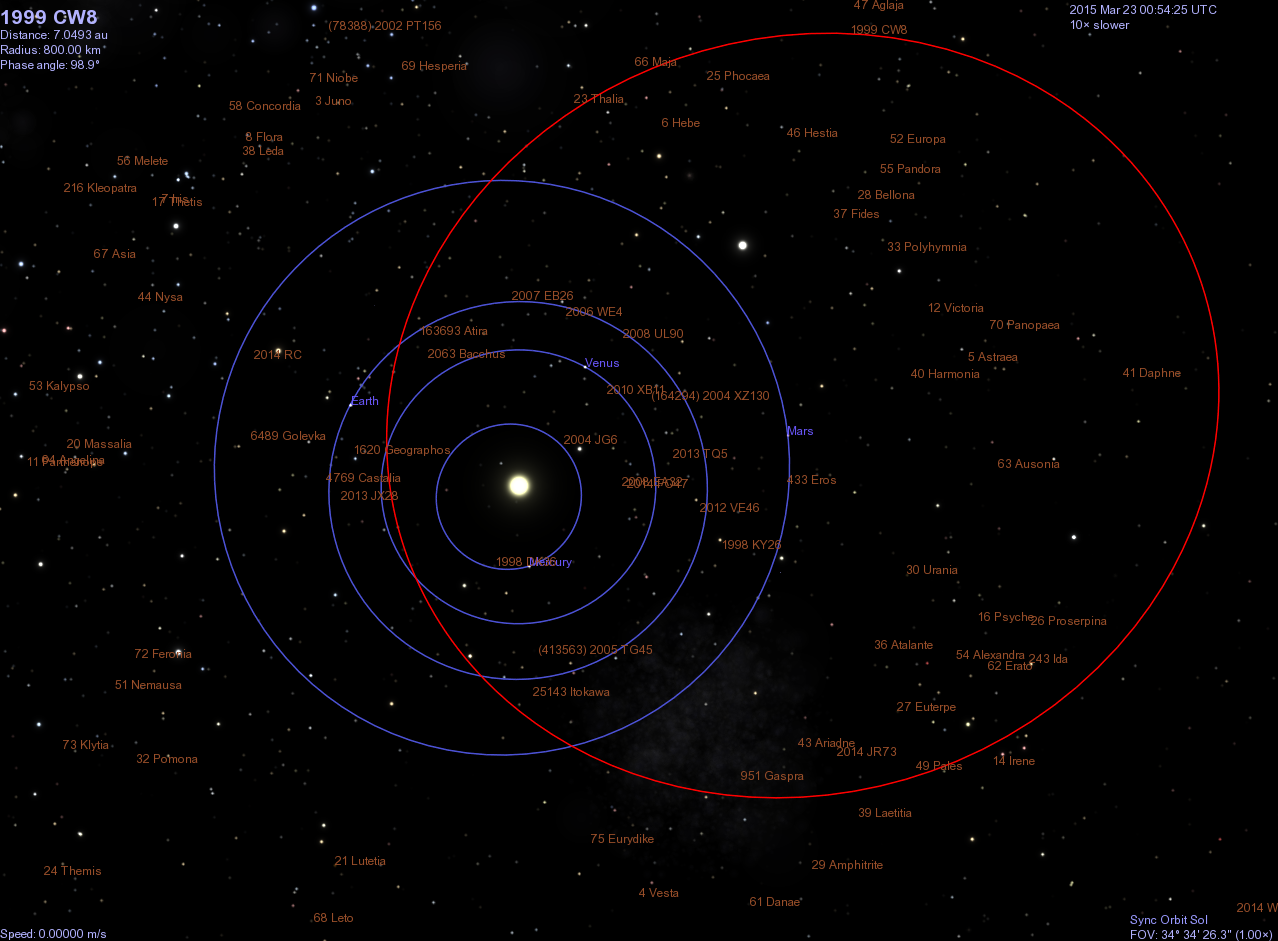
- Orbital diagram of 1999 CW_{8}

Discovery
- Discovered by: LINEAR
- Discovery site: Lincoln Laboratory ETS
- Discovery date: 12 February 1999

Designations
- Minor planet category: NEO · Apollo

Orbital characteristics
- Epoch 27 April 2019 (JD 2458600.5)
- Uncertainty parameter 0
- Observation arc: 20.05 yr (7,322 d)
- Aphelion: 3.5757 AU
- Perihelion: 0.8954 AU
- Semi-major axis: 2.2355 AU
- Eccentricity: 0.5995
- Orbital period (sidereal): 3.34 yr (1,221 d)
- Mean anomaly: 353.67°
- Mean motion: 0° 17^{m} 41.64^{s} / day
- Inclination: 33.645°
- Longitude of ascending node: 317.00°
- Argument of perihelion: 262.11°
- Earth MOID: 0.23 AU (90.2 LD)
- Mars MOID: 0.074 AU

Physical characteristics
- Mean diameter: 0.64 km (est at 0.159)
- Spectral type: SMASS = B
- Absolute magnitude (H): 18.6

(523972) 1999 CW_{8} is a bright carbonaceous asteroid and sub-kilometer near-Earth object of the Apollo group, first observed on 12 February 1999, by astronomers of the Lincoln Near Earth Asteroid Research program at Lincoln Laboratory ETS in New Mexico, United States.

== Numbering and naming ==
This minor planet was numbered by the Minor Planet Center on 18 May 2019 (M.P.C. 114615). As of 2019, it has not been named.

== Orbit and classification ==
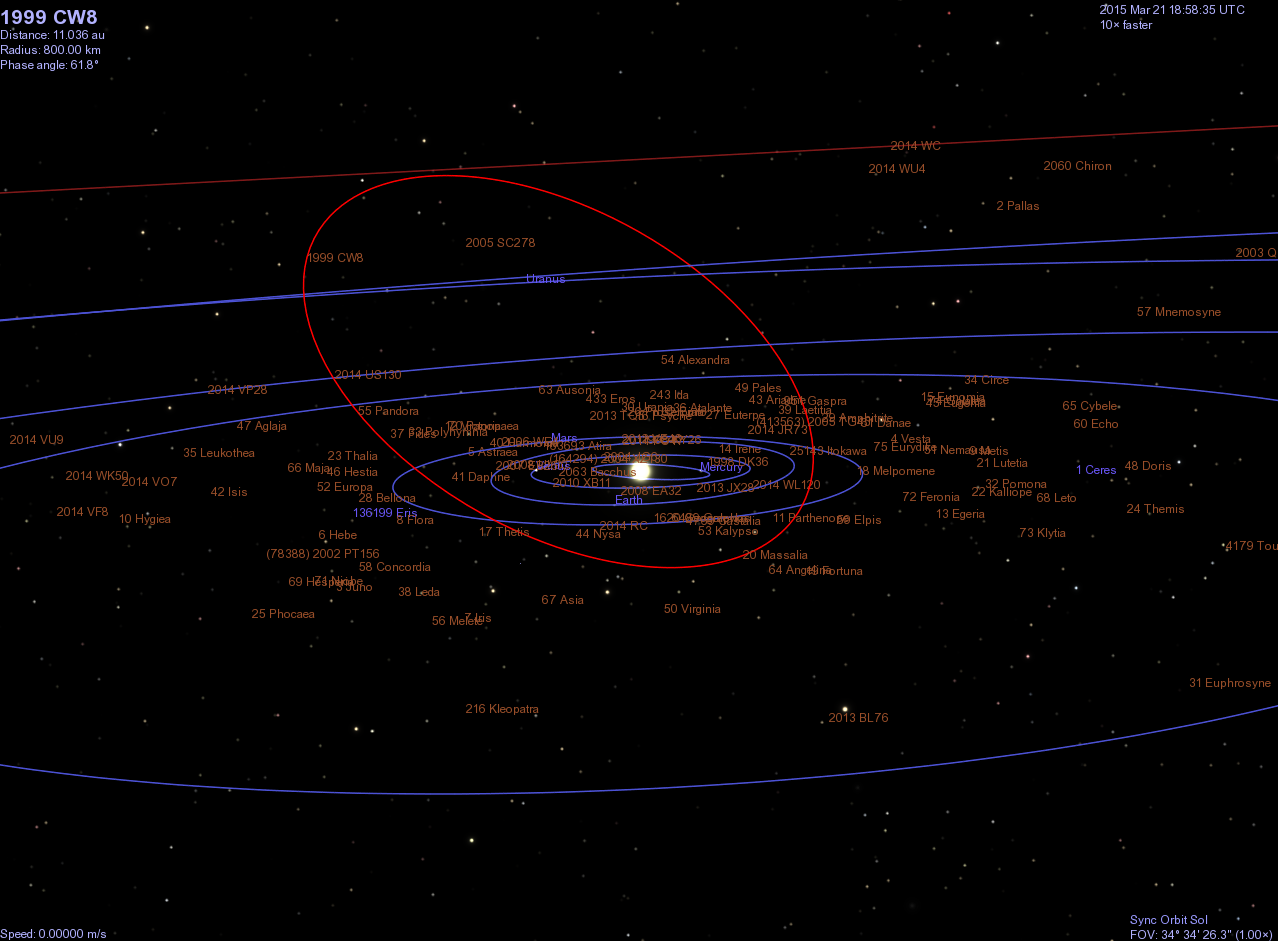
The orbit of 1999 CW_{8}, showing its inclination above the plane of the Solar System

1999 CW_{8} is an Apollo asteroid that crosses Earth's orbit. It orbits the Sun at a distance of 0.9–3.6 AU once every 3 years and 4 months (1,221 days; semi-major axis of 2.24 AU). Its orbit has an eccentricity of 0.60 and an inclination of 34° with respect to the ecliptic. The asteroid never approaches Earth closer than 0.2 AU in the foreseeable future, but occasionally makes close approaches to Mars of 0.07 AU. It makes one such approach in 2073, at 0.067 AU, and another one in 2103, at 0.094 AU. Due to 1999 CW_{8}'s relatively high inclination, although it passes closer to the Sun than the Earth (0.9 AU), it never comes closer than 0.2 AU.

== Physical characteristics ==
It is a carbonaceous B-type asteroid, relatively rare in the asteroid belt but common in the inner Solar System. Based on an absolute magnitude of 18.6, and an assumed albedo of 0.159 (derived from the B-type asteroid 2 Pallas), the asteroid can be estimated to have a mean diameter of approximately 640 meters. If it impacted the Earth would cause significant damage, but not as much as the Cretaceous–Paleogene extinction event progenitor, which brought about a mass extinction, as it is only 1/20 to 1/10 the size. However, it is unlikely to come close enough to Earth to impact it, or even become a risk of impact.

== See also ==
- Mars-crossing asteroid
