= 383 Janina =

Main-belt asteroid

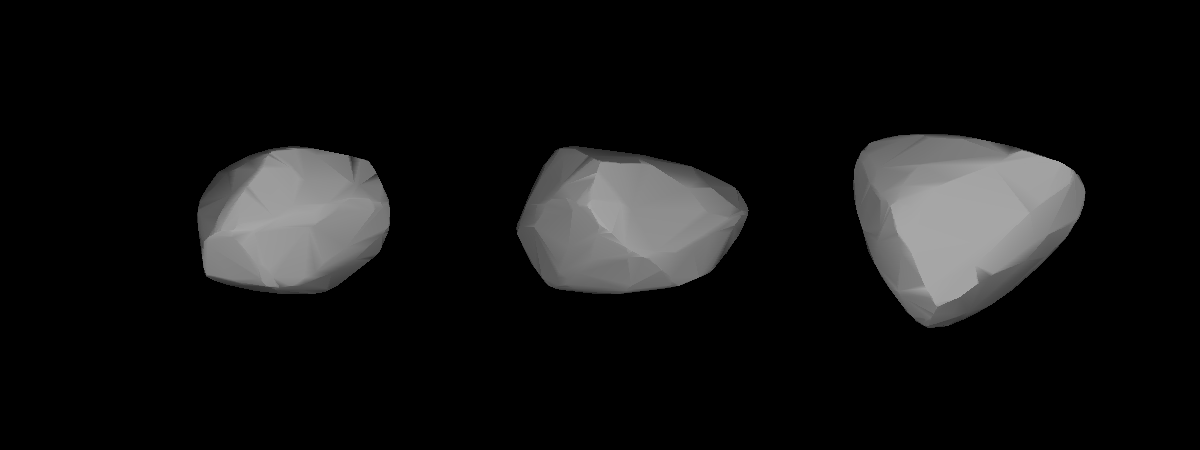
- Lightcurve-base 3D-model of 383 Janina.

Discovery
- Discovered by: Auguste Charlois
- Discovery date: 29 January 1894

Designations
- Pronunciation: French: [ʒanina] German: [jaːˈniːnaː]
- Alternative designations: 1894 AU
- Minor planet category: Main belt (Themis)

Orbital characteristics
- Epoch 31 July 2016 (JD 2457600.5)
- Uncertainty parameter 0
- Observation arc: 122.21 yr (44637 d)
- Aphelion: 3.65762 AU (547.172 Gm)
- Perihelion: 2.63074 AU (393.553 Gm)
- Semi-major axis: 3.14418 AU (470.363 Gm)
- Eccentricity: 0.16330
- Orbital period (sidereal): 5.58 yr (2036.4 d)
- Mean anomaly: 77.0719°
- Mean motion: 0° 10^{m} 36.422^{s} / day
- Inclination: 2.65252°
- Longitude of ascending node: 93.0518°
- Argument of perihelion: 322.137°

Physical characteristics
- Mean diameter: 45.52±1.8 km
- Synodic rotation period: 6.4 h (0.27 d)
- Geometric albedo: 0.0926±0.008
- Spectral type: B
- Absolute magnitude (H): 9.91

383 Janina is a Themistian asteroid, approximately 46 kilometers (29 miles) in diameter. It is spectral B-type and is probably composed of primitive carbonaceous chondritic material.

It was discovered by Auguste Charlois on 29 January 1894 in Nice. The reference of the name is unknown, though it is the French name of Ioannina in Greece, as well as a common German woman's name, both of which probably descend from Johannes.
