= 4997 Ksana =

Asteroid

Discovery
- Discovered by: L. G. Karachkina
- Discovery site: Crimean Astrophysical Obs.
- Discovery date: 6 October 1986

Designations
- Named after: Kseniya A. Nessler (Russian chemist)
- Alternative designations: 1986 TM
- Minor planet category: main-belt · (outer); Pallas

Orbital characteristics
- Epoch 4 September 2017 (JD 2458000.5)
- Uncertainty parameter 0
- Observation arc: 30.57 yr (11,165 days)
- Aphelion: 3.8162 AU
- Perihelion: 1.9285 AU
- Semi-major axis: 2.8723 AU
- Eccentricity: 0.3286
- Orbital period (sidereal): 4.87 yr (1,778 days)
- Mean anomaly: 97.646°
- Mean motion: 0° 12^{m} 9^{s} / day
- Inclination: 32.828°
- Longitude of ascending node: 10.897°
- Argument of perihelion: 57.447°

Physical characteristics
- Dimensions: 7.36±2.79 km 9.860±0.160 km 9.97±0.33 km 10±1 km 14.64 km (calculated)
- Synodic rotation period: 3.4342±0.0003 h
- Geometric albedo: 0.057 (assumed); 0.16±0.03; 0.271±0.206; 0.312±0.022; 0.3157±0.0548; 0.316±0.055
- Spectral type: SMASS = B · B
- Absolute magnitude (H): 11.9 · 12.70 · 12.79±0.30 · 13.0

4997 Ksana, provisional designation 1986 TM, is a carbonaceous Palladian asteroid from the outer region of the asteroid belt, approximately 10 kilometers in diameter. It was discovered on 6 October 1986, by Russian astronomer Lyudmila Karachkina at Crimean Astrophysical Observatory on the Crimean peninsula. The asteroid was named for Russian chemist Kseniya Nessler.

== Orbit and classification ==
Ksana is a small member of the Pallas family (801), a small asteroid family of carbonaceous B-type asteroids. It orbits the Sun in the outer main-belt at a distance of 1.9–3.8 AU once every 4 years and 10 months (1,778 days). Its orbit has an eccentricity of 0.33 and an inclination of 33° with respect to the ecliptic. As no precoveries were taken, the asteroid's observation arc begins with its discovery observation in 1986.

== Physical characteristics ==
On the SMASS taxonomic scheme, Ksana is a B-type asteroid, which are primitive, volatile-rich asteroids. This also agrees with the overall spectral type of the Pallas family.

=== Diameter and albedo ===
According to the surveys carried out by the Japanese Akari satellite and NASA's Wide-field Infrared Survey Explorer with its subsequent NEOWISE mission, Ksana measures between 7.36 and 10±1 kilometers in diameter and its surface has an albedo between 0.16 and 0.316.

The Collaborative Asteroid Lightcurve Link assumes a standard albedo for carbonaceous asteroids of 0.057 and calculates a larger diameter of 14.64 kilometers with an absolute magnitude of 12.9.

=== Rotation period ===
In February 2007, a rotational lightcurve of Ksana was obtained from photometric observations by Italian astronomer Federico Manzini at the SAS observatory in Novara, Italy. It gave it a rotation period of 3.4342±0.0003 hours with a brightness variation of 0.21 in magnitude (U=2).

== Naming ==
This minor planet was named by the discoverer for his friend, the Russian chemist Kseniya Andreevna Nessler, who has been an advocate against environmental pollution. The asteroid's name "Ksana" is a variation of Kseniya (Ксения), the equivalent to the romanized Xenia. The official naming citation was published by the Minor Planet Center on 1 September 1993 (M.P.C. 22505 and 22609).
