= 1191 Alfaterna =

Asteroid

Discovery
- Discovered by: L. Volta
- Discovery site: Pino Torinese Obs.
- Discovery date: 11 February 1931

Designations
- Pronunciation: /ælfəˈtɜːrnə/
- Named after: Nuceria Alfaterna (ancient Roman town)
- Alternative designations: 1931 CA · 1965 AA
- Minor planet category: main-belt · (outer)

Orbital characteristics
- Epoch 4 September 2017 (JD 2458000.5)
- Uncertainty parameter 0
- Observation arc: 85.79 yr (31,335 days)
- Aphelion: 3.0286 AU
- Perihelion: 2.7567 AU
- Semi-major axis: 2.8927 AU
- Eccentricity: 0.0470
- Orbital period (sidereal): 4.92 yr (1,797 days)
- Mean anomaly: 178.01°
- Mean motion: 0° 12^{m} 1.08^{s} / day
- Inclination: 18.491°
- Longitude of ascending node: 134.73°
- Argument of perihelion: 53.411°

Physical characteristics
- Dimensions: 38.92±13.94 km 42.01 km (derived); 42.09±3.0 km 43.38±14.16 km 46.11±0.63 km 46.375±0.836 km 47.397±0.175 km
- Synodic rotation period: 3.664 h (removed) (Note: Pray (2011) web: rotation period 3.664 hours with a brightness amplitude of 0.05 mag. Summary figures for (1191) Alfaterna at Collaborative Asteroid Lightcurve Link (CALL) had been removed; Period Flag "D" (no numerical value) and description "long?". A quality code of 1 was given.); 33.12±1.92 (tentative)
- Geometric albedo: 0.0297±0.0053; 0.04±0.02; 0.04±0.05; 0.045±0.008; 0.0479 (derived); 0.050±0.002; 0.0574±0.009
- Spectral type: C
- Absolute magnitude (H): 10.60 · 10.77 · 10.8 · 10.89±0.21

1191 Alfaterna, provisional designation 1931 CA, is a carbonaceous asteroid from the outer region of the asteroid belt, approximately 43 kilometers in diameter. It was discovered on 11 February 1931, by Italian astronomer Luigi Volta at the Observatory of Turin in northwestern Italy. The asteroid was named for the ancient Roman town of Nuceria Alfaterna.

== Orbit and classification ==
Alfaterna orbits the Sun in the outer main-belt at a distance of 2.8–3.0 AU once every 4 years and 11 months (1,797 days). Its orbit has an eccentricity of 0.05 and an inclination of 18° with respect to the ecliptic.

The first unused observation was taken at Heidelberg two nights prior to its discovery. The body's observation arc begins at Pino Torinese one week after its official discovery observation.

== Physical characteristics ==
Alfaterna has been characterized as a carbonaceous C-type asteroid.

=== Rotation period ===
From 2005 to 2015, several astronomers such as Donald Pray, Henk de Groot and Raoul Behrend, Federico Manzini, as well as Laurent Bernasconi unsuccessfully tried to obtain a well-defined lightcurve of Alfaterna. While Pray derived a period of 3.664 hours with an amplitude of 0.05 magnitude (U=1), the European astronomers published a tentative period of 33.12 hours (U=n.a.). As of 2017, the body's spin rate effectively remains unknown.

=== Diameter and albedo ===
According to the surveys carried out by the Infrared Astronomical Satellite IRAS, the Japanese Akari satellite, and NASA's Wide-field Infrared Survey Explorer with its subsequent NEOWISE mission, Alfaterna measures between 38.92 and 47.397 kilometers in diameter and its surface has an albedo between 0.04 and 0.0574 (without preliminary results). The Collaborative Asteroid Lightcurve Link derives an albedo of 0.0479 and a diameter of 42.01 kilometers using an absolute magnitude of 10.8.

== Naming ==
This minor planet is named for the ancient Roman town of "Nuceria Alfaterna", where now the town Nocera Inferiore/Superiore is located. The ancient city was founded between Pompeii and Salerno in 10th century BC. In 1957, the name was suggested by astronomer Alfonso Fresa at Turin Observatory. The official naming citation was published by the Minor Planet Center on 15 July 1968 (M.P.C. 2882).
