= 1115 Sabauda =

Carbonaceous Meliboean asteroid

Discovery
- Discovered by: L. Volta
- Discovery site: Pino Torinese Obs.
- Discovery date: 13 December 1928

Designations
- Pronunciation: /səˈbɔːdə/
- Named after: House of Savoy (former rulers of Italy)
- Alternative designations: 1928 XC · A906 YF
- Minor planet category: main-belt · (outer); Meliboea

Orbital characteristics
- Epoch 4 September 2017 (JD 2458000.5)
- Uncertainty parameter 0
- Observation arc: 88.47 yr (32,314 days)
- Aphelion: 3.6333 AU
- Perihelion: 2.5750 AU
- Semi-major axis: 3.1041 AU
- Eccentricity: 0.1705
- Orbital period (sidereal): 5.47 yr (1,998 days)
- Mean anomaly: 58.449°
- Mean motion: 0° 10^{m} 48.72^{s} / day
- Inclination: 15.271°
- Longitude of ascending node: 71.679°
- Argument of perihelion: 57.292°

Physical characteristics
- Dimensions: 67.24±21.50 km 68.53 km (derived); 68.82±1.8 km 70.76±0.90 km 75.907±0.656 km 75.91±0.66 km
- Synodic rotation period: 6.7165±0.0007 h (Note: Polakis (2017) publication currently not yet indexed in ADS. Rotation period 6.7165±0.0007 hours. Summary figures for (1115) Sabauda at Collaborative Asteroid Lightcurve Link (CALL)); 6.718±0.001 h 6.72±0.01 h (Note: Lightcurve plot of 1115 Sabauda, Palmer Divide Observatory, Brian D. Warner (2006)); 6.72±0.05 h 6.732±0.005 h
- Geometric albedo: 0.04±0.06; 0.044±0.006; 0.0496 (derived); 0.068±0.002; 0.0711±0.004
- Spectral type: C
- Absolute magnitude (H): 9.30 · 9.60 · 9.63±0.62 · 9.69 · 9.7

1115 Sabauda /səˈbɔːdə/ is a carbonaceous Meliboean asteroid from the outer region of the asteroid belt, approximately 68 kilometers in diameter. Discovered in 1928 by Italian astronomer Luigi Volta, it was assigned the provisional designation 1928 XC. The asteroid was probably named after the House of Savoy, the former rulers of Italy.

== Discovery ==
Sabauda was discovered on 13 December 1928, by Italian astronomer Luigi Volta at the Observatory of Turin (Pino Torinese Observatory). Five nights later, it was independently discovered by Catalan astronomer Josep Comas i Solà at the Fabra Observatory in Barcelona, Spain. The asteroid was first identified as A906 YF at Heidelberg Observatory in December 1906, and its observation arc begins at Heidelberg in January 1929, one month after its official discovery observation at Pino Torinese.

== Orbit and classification ==
Sabauda is a member of the Meliboea family, a smaller asteroid family of carbonaceous outer-belt asteroids with a few hundred members, named after 137 Meliboea. It orbits the Sun in the outer main-belt at a distance of 2.6–3.6 AU once every 5 years and 6 months (1,998 days). Its orbit has an eccentricity of 0.17 and an inclination of 15° with respect to the ecliptic.

== Physical characteristics ==
Sabauda is an assumed carbonaceous C-type asteroid, in line with the Meliboea family's overall spectral type.

=== Rotation period ===
Several rotational lightcurves of Sabauda were obtained from photometric observations. Lightcurve analysis gave a rotation period between 6.718 and 6.732 hours with a brightness amplitude of 0.16 to 0.27 magnitude (U=2+/3-/3).

=== Diameter and albedo ===
According to the surveys carried out by the Infrared Astronomical Satellite IRAS, the Japanese Akari satellite and the NEOWISE mission of NASA's Wide-field Infrared Survey Explorer, Sabauda measures between 67.24 and 75.91 kilometers in diameter and its surface has an albedo between 0.04 and 0.0711.

The Collaborative Asteroid Lightcurve Link derives an albedo of 0.0496 and a diameter of 68.53 kilometers based on an absolute magnitude of 9.7.

== Naming ==
This minor planet bears the Latin name of the former rulers of Italy, the House of Savoy (Sabauda, or Sapauda). It is also possible that it was named after the new established town of Sabauda in the Pontine Marshes, central Italy. The official naming citation was mentioned in The Names of the Minor Planets by Paul Herget in 1955 (H 104).
