= 541 Deborah =

Main-belt asteroid

Discovery
- Discovered by: Max Wolf
- Discovery site: Heidelberg
- Discovery date: 4 August 1904

Designations
- Pronunciation: /ˈdɛbərə/
- Alternative designations: 1904 OO

Orbital characteristics
- Epoch 31 July 2016 (JD 2457600.5)
- Uncertainty parameter 0
- Observation arc: 111.69 yr (40793 d)
- Aphelion: 2.9569 AU (442.35 Gm)
- Perihelion: 2.6746 AU (400.11 Gm)
- Semi-major axis: 2.8157 AU (421.22 Gm)
- Eccentricity: 0.050128
- Orbital period (sidereal): 4.72 yr (1725.8 d)
- Mean anomaly: 307.870°
- Mean motion: 0° 12^{m} 30.96^{s} / day
- Inclination: 6.0007°
- Longitude of ascending node: 267.656°
- Argument of perihelion: 357.52°

Physical characteristics
- Dimensions: 57±2 km
- Synodic rotation period: 29.368 h (1.2237 d)
- Geometric albedo: 0.0496±0.005
- Absolute magnitude (H): 10.1

541 Deborah is a minor planet orbiting the Sun. It was discovered by Max Wolf on August 4, 1904. The semi-major axis of the orbit lies just inside the 5/2 Kirkwood gap, located at 2.824 AU. It was named after the biblical character Deborah.
