= 803 Picka =

Main-belt asteroid

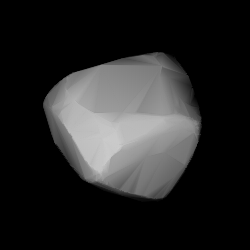
- Modelled shape of Picka from its lightcurve

Discovery
- Discovered by: J. Palisa
- Discovery site: Vienna Obs.
- Discovery date: 21 March 1915

Designations
- Named after: Friedrich Pick (Czech medical doctor)
- Alternative designations: A915 FL · 1952 YH; 1984 EC_{2} · A899 NE; A915 FD · 1915 WS
- Minor planet category: main-belt · (outer); background

Orbital characteristics
- Epoch 31 May 2020 (JD 2459000.5)
- Uncertainty parameter 0
- Observation arc: 104.50 yr (38,169 d)
- Aphelion: 3.4133 AU
- Perihelion: 2.9929 AU
- Semi-major axis: 3.2031 AU
- Eccentricity: 0.0656
- Orbital period (sidereal): 5.73 yr (2,094 d)
- Mean anomaly: 338.93°
- Mean motion: 0° 10^{m} 18.84^{s} / day
- Inclination: 8.6665°
- Longitude of ascending node: 250.95°
- Argument of perihelion: 58.556°

Physical characteristics
- Mean diameter: 46.50±2.2 km; 57.41±0.95 km; 69.165±8.353 km
- Synodic rotation period: 5.0742±0.0006 h
- Pole ecliptic latitude: (218.0°, 34.0°) (λ_{1}/β_{1}); (53.0°, 41.0°) (λ_{2}/β_{2})
- Geometric albedo: 0.035±0.102; 0.079±0.003; 0.1181±0.012
- Spectral type: TD (SMASS-I, Xu); D (SDSS-MOC); V–R = 0.488±0.011
- Absolute magnitude (H): 9.30; 9.4; 9.60

803 Picka (prov. designation: A915 FL or 1915 WS) is a large and dark background asteroid from the outer regions of the asteroid belt. It was discovered on 21 March 1915, by Austrian astronomer Johann Palisa at the Vienna Observatory. The carbonaceous D-type asteroid has a rotation period of 5.1 hours and measures approximately 57 kilometers (35 miles) in diameter. It was named after Czech medical doctor Friedrich Pick (1867–1921).

== Orbit and classification ==
Picka is a non-family asteroid of the main belt's background population when applying the hierarchical clustering method to its proper orbital elements. It orbits the Sun in the outer asteroid belt at a distance of 3.0–3.4 AU once every 5 years and 9 months (2,094 days; semi-major axis of 3.2 AU). Its orbit has an eccentricity of 0.07 and an inclination of 9° with respect to the ecliptic. On 8 July 1899, the asteroid was first observed as A899 NE at the Boyden Station (800) of the Harvard Observatory in Arequipa, Peru. The body's observation arc begins with its official discovery observation by Johann Palisa at Vienna Observatory on 21 March 1915.

== Naming ==
This minor planet was named after Czech medical doctor Friedrich Pick (1867–1921) from Prague, who was the first medical doctor to introduce endoscopic methods in medicine. According to the 1917 edition of the astronomical calendar in German "Astronomischer Kalender für 1917", the asteroid was named by friends of the discoverer Johann Palisa. The naming was mentioned in The Names of the Minor Planets by Paul Herget in 1955 (H 80).

== Physical characteristics ==
In the SDSS-based taxonomy, Picka is a dark D-type asteroid. In the 1995 SMASS-I survey by Xu, it is classified as an uncommon T-type with some similarities to a D-type (TD). The D-types asteroids are common in the outer main-belt and are very abundant among the Jupiter trojan population.

=== Rotation period ===
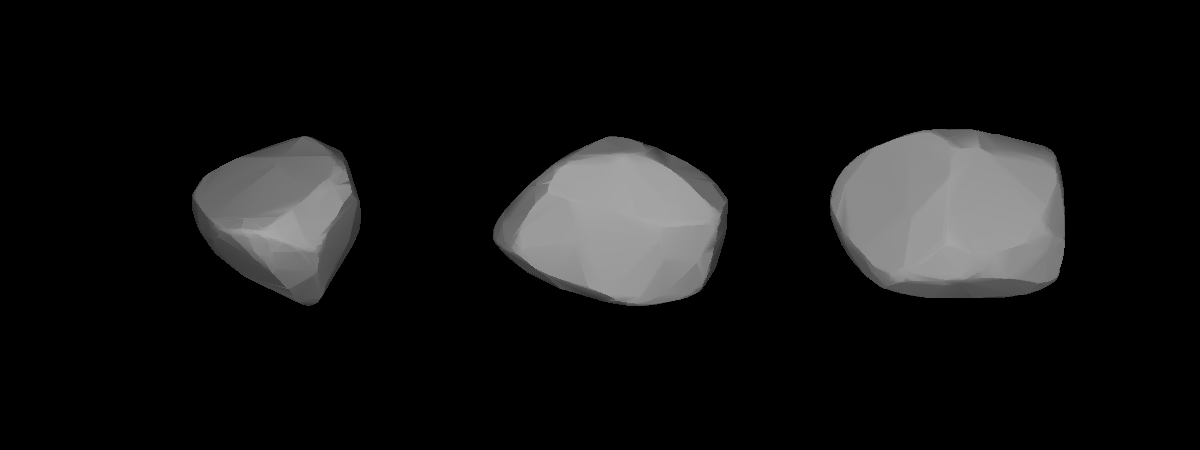
Lightcurve based 3D-model of Picka

In April 2007, a rotational lightcurve of Picka was obtained from photometric observations by French amateur astronomer Pierre Antonini. Lightcurve analysis gave a well-defined rotation period of 5.0742±0.0006 hours with a high brightness variation of 0.47±0.01 magnitude, indicative of an elongated shape (U=3). Alternative and lower-rated photometric observations were made by Jean-Gabriel Bosch in February 2006, and again by Pierre Antonini in November 2010, which gave a period of 5.13±0.05 and 5.0752±0.0003 hours with an amplitude of 0.43±0.03 and 0.12±0.01 magnitude (U=2/3–).

Lightcurve inversion also modeled the body's shape and poles. In 2013, modelling by an international study using photometric data from the US Naval Observatory, the Uppsala Asteroid Photometric Catalogue, the Palomar Transient Factory and the Catalina Sky Survey gave a concurring sidereal period of 5.07478±0.00002 hours and two spin axes at (218.0°, 34.0°) and (53.0°, 41.0°) in ecliptic coordinates (λ, β). The body's very elongated shape had already been indicated by the relatively high brightness variation measured during the direct photometric observations.

=== Diameter and albedo ===
According to the surveys carried out by the Infrared Astronomical Satellite IRAS, the Japanese Akari satellite and the NEOWISE mission of NASA's Wide-field Infrared Survey Explorer (WISE), Picka measures (46.50±2.2), (57.41±0.95) and (69.165±8.353) kilometers in diameter and its surface has an albedo of (0.1181±0.012), (0.079±0.003) and (0.035±0.102), respectively. The Collaborative Asteroid Lightcurve Link derives an albedo of 0.1406 and a diameter of 46.72 kilometers based on an absolute magnitude of 9.4. On 13 May 2015, an asteroid occultation of Picka gave a best-fit ellipse dimension of (57.0 km × 57.0 km), which is similar to that obtained by the Japanese Akari satellite. These timed observations are taken when the asteroid passes in front of a distant star. This observation still has received a low quality rating.
