= 1238 Predappia =

Adeonian asteroid

Discovery
- Discovered by: L. Volta
- Discovery site: Pino Torinese Obs.
- Discovery date: 4 February 1932

Designations
- Named after: Predappio (Italian town)
- Alternative designations: 1932 CA · 1954 EQ; 1961 XU
- Minor planet category: main-belt · (middle); Eunomia · Adeona

Orbital characteristics
- Epoch 4 September 2017 (JD 2458000.5)
- Uncertainty parameter 0
- Observation arc: 80.42 yr (29,372 days)
- Aphelion: 3.0430 AU
- Perihelion: 2.2905 AU
- Semi-major axis: 2.6667 AU
- Eccentricity: 0.1411
- Orbital period (sidereal): 4.35 yr (1,591 days)
- Mean anomaly: 225.94°
- Mean motion: 0° 13^{m} 34.68^{s} / day
- Inclination: 12.155°
- Longitude of ascending node: 51.944°
- Argument of perihelion: 91.913°

Physical characteristics
- Dimensions: 19.91 km (derived); 19.96±1.0 km 20.606±0.058 km 21.204±0.206 km 21.70±6.92 km 27.09±1.02 km 32.14±6.44 km
- Synodic rotation period: 6.13±0.04 h (poor); 8.94±0.02 h (Note: Lightcurve plot of 1238 Predappia, Palmer Divide Observatory, Brian D. Warner (2006). Summary figures at the LCDB); 24 h (poor)
- Geometric albedo: 0.02±0.02; 0.042±0.004; 0.0447±0.0040; 0.05±0.05; 0.0644 (derived); 0.070±0.007; 0.0771±0.008
- Spectral type: S (assumed)
- Absolute magnitude (H): 11.90 · 12.10 · 12.12±0.18

1238 Predappia, provisional designation 1932 CA, is a dark Adeonian asteroid from the central regions of the asteroid belt, approximately 21 kilometers in diameter. It was discovered on 4 February 1932, by astronomer Luigi Volta at the Observatory of Turin in Pino Torinese, Italy. It was later named after the Italian village of Predappio.

== Orbit and classification ==
Predappia is a member of the Adeona family (505), a large family of carbonaceous asteroids in the intermediary main belt, named after 145 Adeona. It is also dynamically classified as a member of the Eunomia family (502), the largest in the intermediate main belt with more than 5,000 stony asteroids.

It orbits the Sun in the central asteroid belt at a distance of 2.3–3.0 AU once every 4 years and 4 months (1,591 days). Its orbit has an eccentricity of 0.14 and an inclination of 12° with respect to the ecliptic. The body's observation arc begins at Uccle in March 1941, more than 9 years after to its official discovery observation at Pino Torinese.

== Physical characteristics ==
Predappia's spectral type is unknown. Although the LCDB assumes an S-type (due to its dynamical classification to the stony Eunomia family), a low albedo of 0.0644 is derived (see below) which is typical for carbonaceous C-type asteroids and in agreement with the overall spectral type of the Adeona family (505).

=== Rotation period ===
Photometric observations of the asteroid during 2006 by Brian Warner at the Palmer Divide Observatory (716) in Colorado Springs, Colorado, were used to generate a lightcurve with a period of 8.94 ± 0.02 hours and a variation in brightness of 0.03 ± 0.01 magnitude (U=2-). Other observations obtained a poorly rated lightcurve with a divergent period of 6.13 and 24 hours, respectively.

=== Diameter and albedo ===
According to the surveys carried out by the Infrared Astronomical Satellite IRAS, the Japanese Akari satellite and the NEOWISE mission of NASA's Wide-field Infrared Survey Explorer, Predappia measures between 19.96 and 32.14 kilometers in diameter and its surface has an albedo between 0.02 and 0.0771.

The Collaborative Asteroid Lightcurve Link derives an albedo of 0.0644 and a diameter of 19.91 kilometers based on an absolute magnitude of 12.1.

== Naming ==
This minor planet was named after the Italian village of Predappio near Forli, known for being the birthplace of Benito Mussolini, the founder of Italian Fascism and Italian Dictator until 1943. The author of the Dictionary of Minor Planet Names, Lutz Schmadel, contacted Italian astronomer Paul G. Comba, who confirmed that this naming was "another clear instance of homage to him". Predappio has become a site of pilgrimage for Italian and other neofascists.
