= 531 Zerlina =

Main-belt asteroid

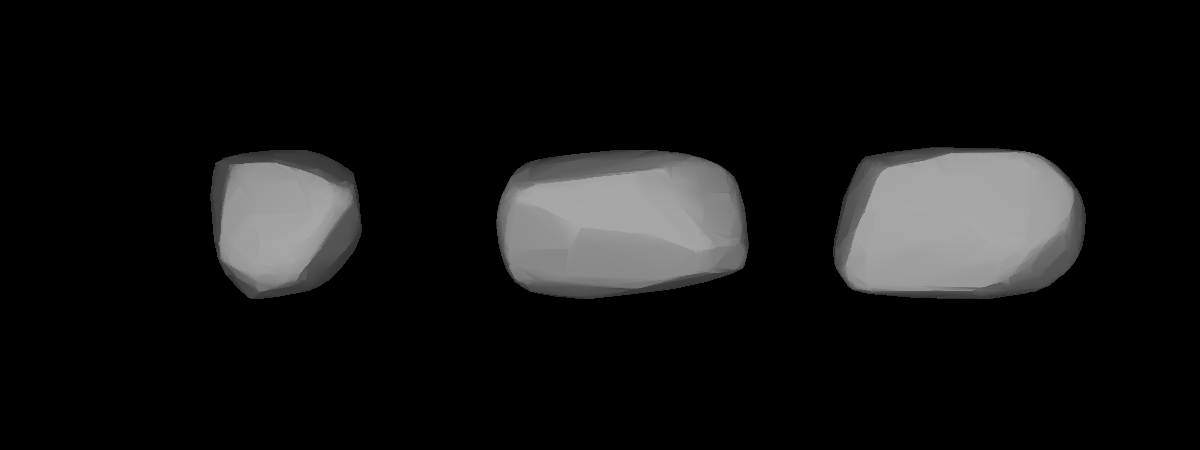
- Lightcurve-based 3D-model of Zerlina

Discovery
- Discovered by: M. F. Wolf
- Discovery site: Heidelberg Obs.
- Discovery date: 12 April 1904

Designations
- Pronunciation: Italian: [dzerˈliːna]
- Named after: Zerlina, Masetto's fiancée (Don Giovanni)
- Alternative designations: 1904 NW · 1955 HA
- Minor planet category: main-belt · (middle); Pallas

Orbital characteristics
- Epoch 4 September 2017 (JD 2458000.5)
- Uncertainty parameter 0
- Observation arc: 112.56 yr (41,114 days)
- Aphelion: 3.3356 AU
- Perihelion: 2.2379 AU
- Semi-major axis: 2.7867 AU
- Eccentricity: 0.1970
- Orbital period (sidereal): 4.65 yr (1,699 days)
- Mean anomaly: 104.09°
- Mean motion: 0° 12^{m} 42.84^{s} / day
- Inclination: 33.994°
- Longitude of ascending node: 197.73°
- Argument of perihelion: 57.751°

Physical characteristics
- Dimensions: 13.65±0.32 km 13.87±4.02 km 14.11±0.45 km 15.12 km (derived); 15.19±1.3 km 15.8±1.6 km 16±2 km 17.804±0.178 km
- Synodic rotation period: 12 h 16 h 16.716±0.003 h 16.706±0.001 h
- Geometric albedo: 0.10±0.02; 0.10±0.08; 0.101±0.007; 0.11±0.02; 0.1225 (derived); 0.1460±0.028; 0.150±0.030; 0.185±0.014
- Spectral type: SMASS = B · B
- Absolute magnitude (H): 11.80; 12.0; 12.25

531 Zerlina, provisional designation 1904 NW, carbonaceous Palladian asteroid from the central region of the asteroid belt, approximately 18 kilometers in diameter. It was discovered by German astronomer Max Wolf at the Heidelberg-Königstuhl State Observatory on 12 April 1904. It is named for a character in Mozart's opera, Don Giovanni H 57).

Observations using the IRAS satellite have shown it to have an absolute magnitude of 11.8, a diameter of 15.19 kilometers, a rotational period of 16.706 hours, and an albedo of 0.1460.
