= 372 Palma =

Main-belt asteroid

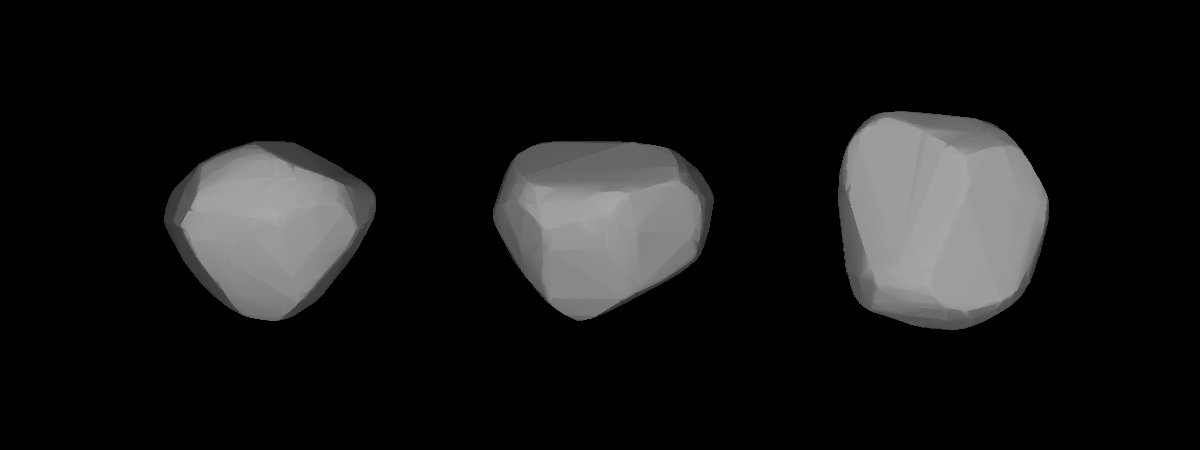
- A three-dimensional model of 372 Palma based on its lightcurve

Discovery
- Discovered by: Auguste Charlois
- Discovery date: 19 August 1893

Designations
- Pronunciation: /ˈpælmə/
- Named after: Palma
- Alternative designations: 1893 AH
- Minor planet category: Main belt

Orbital characteristics
- Epoch 31 July 2016 (JD 2457600.5)
- Uncertainty parameter 0
- Observation arc: 122.54 yr (44757 d)
- Aphelion: 3.9693 AU (593.80 Gm)
- Perihelion: 2.33325 AU (349.049 Gm)
- Semi-major axis: 3.15125 AU (471.420 Gm)
- Eccentricity: 0.25958
- Orbital period (sidereal): 5.59 yr (2043.3 d)
- Mean anomaly: 275.769°
- Mean motion: 0° 10^{m} 34.284^{s} / day
- Inclination: 23.828°
- Longitude of ascending node: 327.37°
- Argument of perihelion: 115.582°

Physical characteristics
- Mean diameter: 187 ± 20/198 ± 26 km
- Mass: (5.15 ± 0.64) × 10^{18} kg (composite estimate) (5.51±0.93)×10^{18} kg (Note: Calculated from its standard gravitational parameter GM = 0.368±0.062 km^{3}/s^{2}.)
- Mean density: 1.27–1.61 g/cm^{3} (calculated)
- Synodic rotation period: 8.567 h (0.3570 d)
- Pole ecliptic longitude: 221°/44°
- Pole ecliptic latitude: −47°/17°
- Geometric albedo: 0.059±0.009
- Spectral type: BFC/B
- Absolute magnitude (H): 7.39

372 Palma is one of the largest main-belt asteroids. It was discovered by French astronomer Auguste Charlois on August 19, 1893, in Nice. The name is thought to come from the capital city of Mallorca, an island of the Balearic Islands (Spain), which is located south of France. It is one of seven of Charlois's discoveries that were expressly named by the Astromomisches Rechen-Institut (Astronomical Calculation Institute).

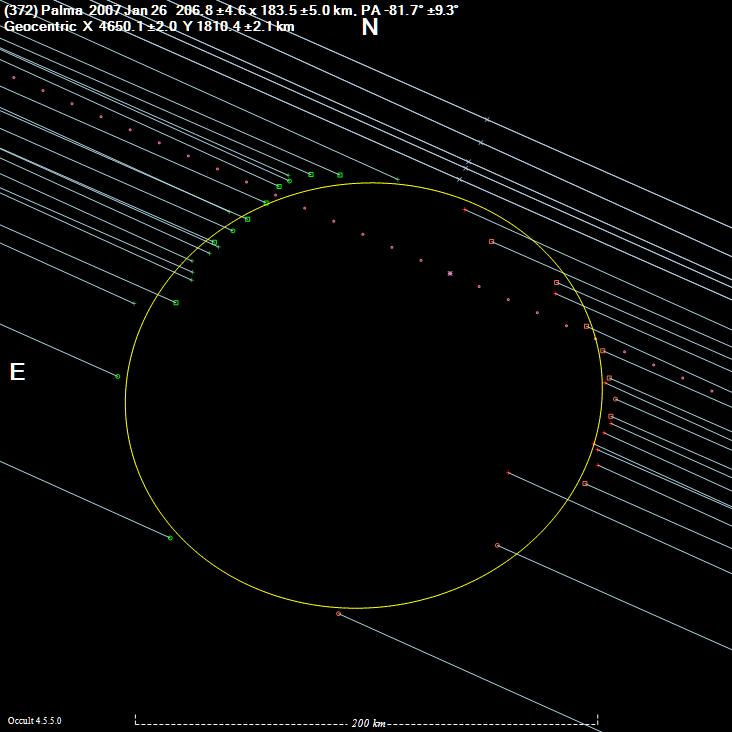
Plot of an occultation of the star HIP 41975 observed on January 26, 2007, by a group of American home-based and mobile citizen astronomers

This object is orbiting the Sun at a distance of 3.15 AU with a moderate eccentricity (ovalness) of 0.26 and an orbital period of 5.59 years. The orbital plane is inclined at an angle of 23.8° relative to the plane of the ecliptic. It is classified as a B-type asteroid and is spinning with a rotation period of 8.567 hours.

Since 2000, 372 Palma has been observed 14 times in an asteroid occultation event, a number of which produced multiple chords revealing the asteroid's size and shape. It was observed occulting the radio galaxy 0141+268 on May 15, 2017, which yielded a diameter estimate of 192.1±4.8 km. On September 13, 2018, it was revealed to be 120 miles long (193 kilometers long).

== See also ==
- List of exceptional asteroids
