= 1209 Pumma =

Hygiean asteroid discovered in 1927

Discovery
- Discovered by: K. Reinmuth
- Discovery site: Heidelberg Obs.
- Discovery date: 22 April 1927

Designations
- Named after: Niece of discoverer's friend
- Alternative designations: 1927 HA · 1950 JQ; 1963 UU
- Minor planet category: main-belt · (outer); Hygiea

Orbital characteristics
- Epoch 4 September 2017 (JD 2458000.5)
- Uncertainty parameter 0
- Observation arc: 90.20 yr (32,945 days)
- Aphelion: 3.5836 AU
- Perihelion: 2.7590 AU
- Semi-major axis: 3.1713 AU
- Eccentricity: 0.1300
- Orbital period (sidereal): 5.65 yr (2,063 days)
- Mean anomaly: 302.93°
- Mean motion: 0° 10^{m} 28.2^{s} / day
- Inclination: 6.9333°
- Longitude of ascending node: 89.806°
- Argument of perihelion: 176.87°

Physical characteristics
- Dimensions: 21.73±2.15 km 26.889±0.253 km 26.986±0.311 km 40.33 km (calculated)
- Synodic rotation period: 8.5001±0.0001 h
- Geometric albedo: 0.057 (assumed); 0.1397±0.0360; 0.141±0.028; 0.215±0.055
- Spectral type: C (assumed)
- Absolute magnitude (H): 10.60 · 10.62±0.19 · 10.7

1209 Pumma (provisional designation 1927 HA) is a Hygiean asteroid from the outer region of the asteroid belt, approximately 30 kilometers in diameter. It was discovered on 22 April 1927, by German astronomer Karl Reinmuth at Heidelberg Observatory in southwest Germany. The asteroid was named after the niece of astronomer Albrecht Kahrstedt.

== Orbit and classification ==
Pumma is a member of the Hygiea family (601), a very large family of carbonaceous outer-belt asteroids, named after the fourth-largest asteroid, 10 Hygiea. It orbits the Sun in the outer main-belt at a distance of 2.8–3.6 AU once every 5 years and 8 months (2,063 days). Its orbit has an eccentricity of 0.13 and an inclination of 7° with respect to the ecliptic. No precoveries were taken, and no prior identifications were made. The body's observation arc begins at Uccle, 8 days after its official discovery observation at Heidelberg.

== Physical characteristics ==
=== Lightcurve ===
In April 2012, a rotational lightcurve of Pumma was obtained from photometric observations by Italian and French amateur astronomers Silvano Casulli and René Roy. Lightcurve analysis gave a well-defined rotation period of 8.5001 hours with a brightness variation of 0.28 magnitude (U=3).

=== Diameter and albedo ===
According to the survey carried out by NASA's Wide-field Infrared Survey Explorer with its subsequent NEOWISE mission, Pumma measures between 21.73 and 26.99 kilometers in diameter, and its surface has an albedo between 0.139 and 0.215. The Collaborative Asteroid Lightcurve Link assumes a standard albedo for carbonaceous C-type asteroids of 0.057 and consequently calculates a much larger diameter of 40.33 kilometers using an absolute magnitude of 10.7.

== Naming ==
This minor planet's name was proposed by German astronomer Albrecht Kahrstedt (1897–1971), a staff member at ARI and later director at Babelsberg Observatory (also see 1587 Kahrstedt). "Pumma" is the nickname of a niece of Kahrstedt. The official naming citation was published by Paul Herget in The Names of the Minor Planets in 1955 (H 112).
