= 560 Delila =

Helo

Discovery
- Discovered by: M. F. Wolf
- Discovery site: Heidelberg
- Discovery date: 13 March 1905

Designations
- Pronunciation: /dɛˈlaɪlə/, German: [deːliːlaː]
- Alternative designations: 1905 QF

Orbital characteristics
- Epoch 31 July 2016 (JD 2457600.5)
- Uncertainty parameter 0
- Observation arc: 111.10 yr (40580 d)
- Aphelion: 3.1947 AU (477.92 Gm)
- Perihelion: 2.3053 AU (344.87 Gm)
- Semi-major axis: 2.7500 AU (411.39 Gm)
- Eccentricity: 0.16171
- Orbital period (sidereal): 4.56 yr (1665.7 d)
- Mean anomaly: 187.50°
- Mean motion: 0° 12^{m} 58.032^{s} / day
- Inclination: 8.4698°
- Longitude of ascending node: 105.351°
- Argument of perihelion: 3.8614°

Physical characteristics
- Mean radius: 18.62±0.65 km
- Synodic rotation period: 29.913 h (1.2464 d)
- Geometric albedo: 0.0733±0.005
- Absolute magnitude (H): 11.0

560 Delila is a minor planet orbiting the Sun. It was named after the biblical character Delilah in Saint-Saëns's opera Samson et Dalila, which was first performed in German translation.
