= 1990 Pilcher =

Stony main-belt asteroid

Discovery
- Discovered by: K. Reinmuth
- Discovery site: Heidelberg Obs.
- Discovery date: 9 March 1956

Designations
- Named after: Frederick Pilcher (American photometrist)
- Alternative designations: 1956 EE · 1937 JL; 1940 FA · 1959 CE_{1} 1964 VS_{2} · 1972 EC; 1972 GO · 1973 QM
- Minor planet category: main-belt · (inner) background · Flora

Orbital characteristics
- Epoch 23 March 2018 (JD 2458200.5)
- Uncertainty parameter 0
- Observation arc: 80.17 yr (29,283 d)
- Aphelion: 2.2851 AU
- Perihelion: 2.0625 AU
- Semi-major axis: 2.1738 AU
- Eccentricity: 0.0512
- Orbital period (sidereal): 3.21 yr (1,171 d)
- Mean anomaly: 92.884°
- Mean motion: 0° 18^{m} 27^{s} / day
- Inclination: 3.1320°
- Longitude of ascending node: 193.63°
- Argument of perihelion: 11.957°

Physical characteristics
- Mean diameter: 6.39 km (calculated); 6.754±0.167 km 7.273±0.064 km
- Synodic rotation period: 2.842±0.001 h
- Geometric albedo: 0.1864±0.0254; 0.215±0.039; 0.24 (assumed)
- Spectral type: Tholen = S S (assumed); B–V = 0.850; U–B = 0.504
- Absolute magnitude (H): 13.14

1990 Pilcher, provisional designation 1956 EE, is a stony background asteroid from the Florian region of the inner asteroid belt, approximately 7 kilometers (4.3 miles) in diameter. It was discovered on 9 March 1956, by German astronomer Karl Reinmuth at the Heidelberg-Königstuhl State Observatory in Heidelberg, Germany. In 1982, it was named by the MPC for American physicist and photometrist Frederick Pilcher. The S-type asteroid has a short rotation period of 2.8 hours.

== Orbit and classification ==
Pilcher is a non-family asteroid of the main belt's background population when applying the hierarchical clustering method (HCM) to its proper orbital elements (Nesvorný, Milani and Knežević). In a previous HCM-analysis (Zappalà) and based on osculating Keplerian orbital elements, the asteroid has also been classified as a member of the Flora family (402), a giant asteroid family and the largest family of stony asteroids in the main-belt.

It orbits the Sun in the Florian region of the inner asteroid belt at a distance of 2.1–2.3 AU once every 3 years and 3 months (1,171 days; semi-major axis of 2.17 AU). Its orbit has an eccentricity of 0.05 and an inclination of 3° with respect to the ecliptic.

The asteroid was first observed as 1937 JL at Nice Observatory in May 1937. The body's observation arc begins with a precovery taken at Palomar Observatory in June 1950, or six years prior to its official discovery observation at Heidelberg.

== Physical characteristics ==
In the Tholen classification, Pilcher is a common, stony S-type asteroid.

=== Rotation period ===
In March 2017, a first rotational lightcurve of Pilcher was obtained from photometric observations at the Flarestar Observatory on the island of Malta. Lightcurve analysis gave a short rotation period of 2.842 hours with a brightness amplitude of 0.10 magnitude, indicative for a rather spherical shape (U=2+).

=== Diameter and albedo ===
According to the survey carried out by the NEOWISE mission of NASA's Wide-field Infrared Survey Explorer, Pilcher measures between 6.754 and 7.273 kilometers in diameter and its surface has an albedo between 0.1864 and 0.215.

The Collaborative Asteroid Lightcurve Link assumes an albedo of 0.24 – derived from 8 Flora, the Flora family's parent body and namesake – and calculates a diameter of 6.39 kilometers based on an absolute magnitude of 13.14.

== Naming ==
This minor planet was named after American astronomer Frederick Pilcher, a retired professor of Physics at Illinois College and prolific lightcurve photometrist at his Organ Mesa Observatory (G50) in New Mexico. The official naming citation was published by the Minor Planet Center on 8 April 1982 (M.P.C. 6833).
