= Observatory of Turin =

Turin Astrophysical Observatory
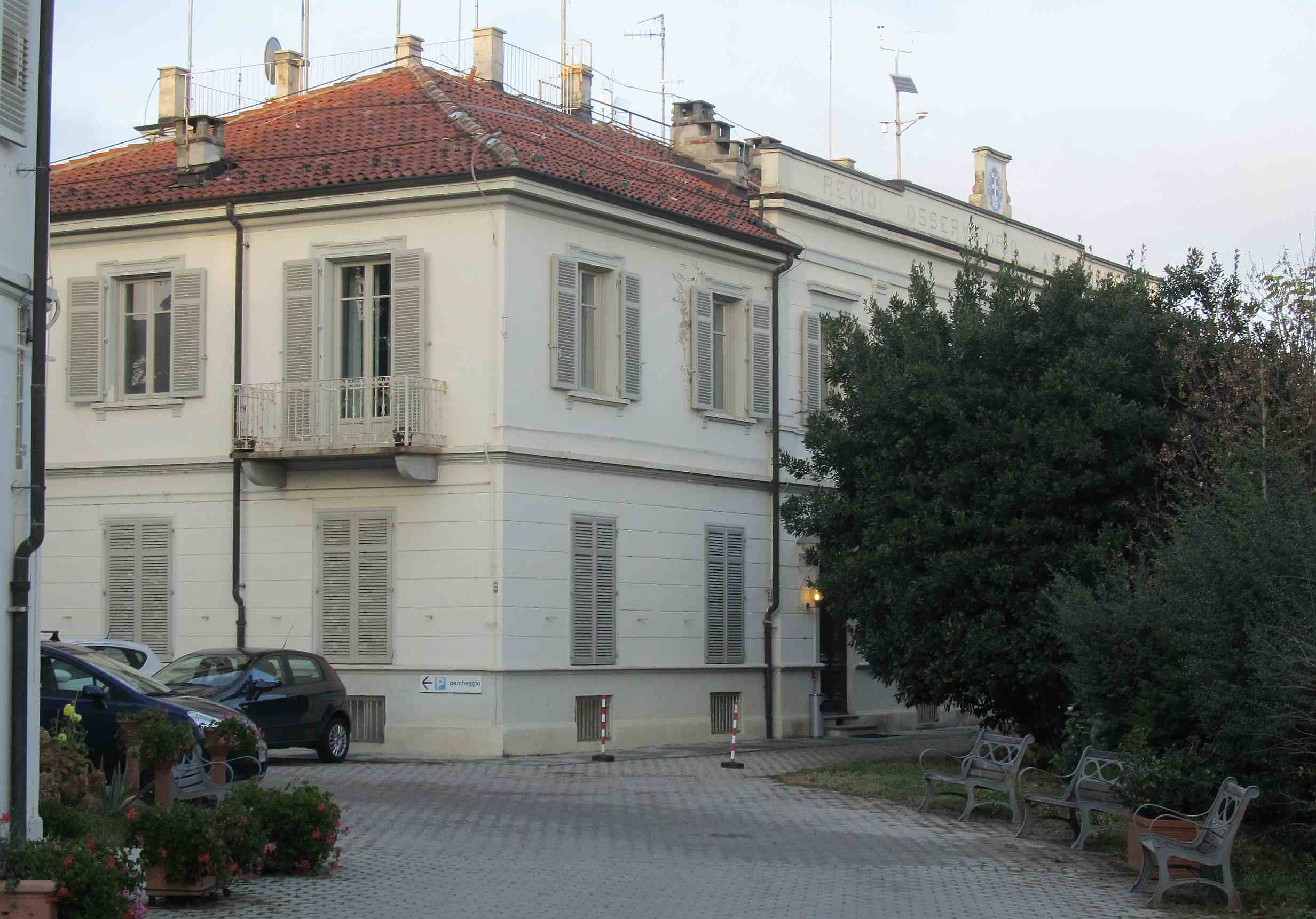
- Alternative names: Observatory of Turin
- Observatory code: 022
- Location: Pino Torinese, Metropolitan City of Turin, Piedmont, Italy
- Coordinates: 45°02′29″N 7°45′54″E
- Website: http://www.oato.inaf.it,%20https://www.beniculturali.inaf.it/biblioteche/torino
- Location of Observatory of Turin
- Related media on Commons

The Observatory of Turin (Italian: Osservatorio Astronomico di Torino, also known as Pino Torinese; obs. code: 022) is an astronomical observatory owned and operated by Italy's National Institute for Astrophysics (Italian: Istituto Nazionale di Astrofisica, INAF). It is located on the top of a hill in the town of Pino Torinese near Turin, in the north Italian Piedmont region. The observatory was founded in 1759. At Pino Torinese, several asteroid discoveries were made by Italian astronomer Luigi Volta in the late 1920s and early 1930s. The asteroid 2694 Pino Torinese was named after the observatory's location.

== Asteroids discovered at Pino Torinese ==
1107 Lictoria	30 March 1929	^{[A]}
1115 Sabauda	13 December 1928	^{[A]}
1191 Alfaterna	11 February 1931	^{[A]}
1238 Predappia	4 February 1932	^{[A]}
1332 Marconia	9 January 1934	^{[A]}
(30768) 1983 YK	29 December 1983	^{[B]}^{[C]}
Discovery made by:^{A} L. Volta · ^{B} G. Massone · ^{C} G. DeSanctis

== See also ==
- List of astronomical observatories
