= B-type asteroid =

Asteroid spectral class; uncommon type of carbonaceous asteroid

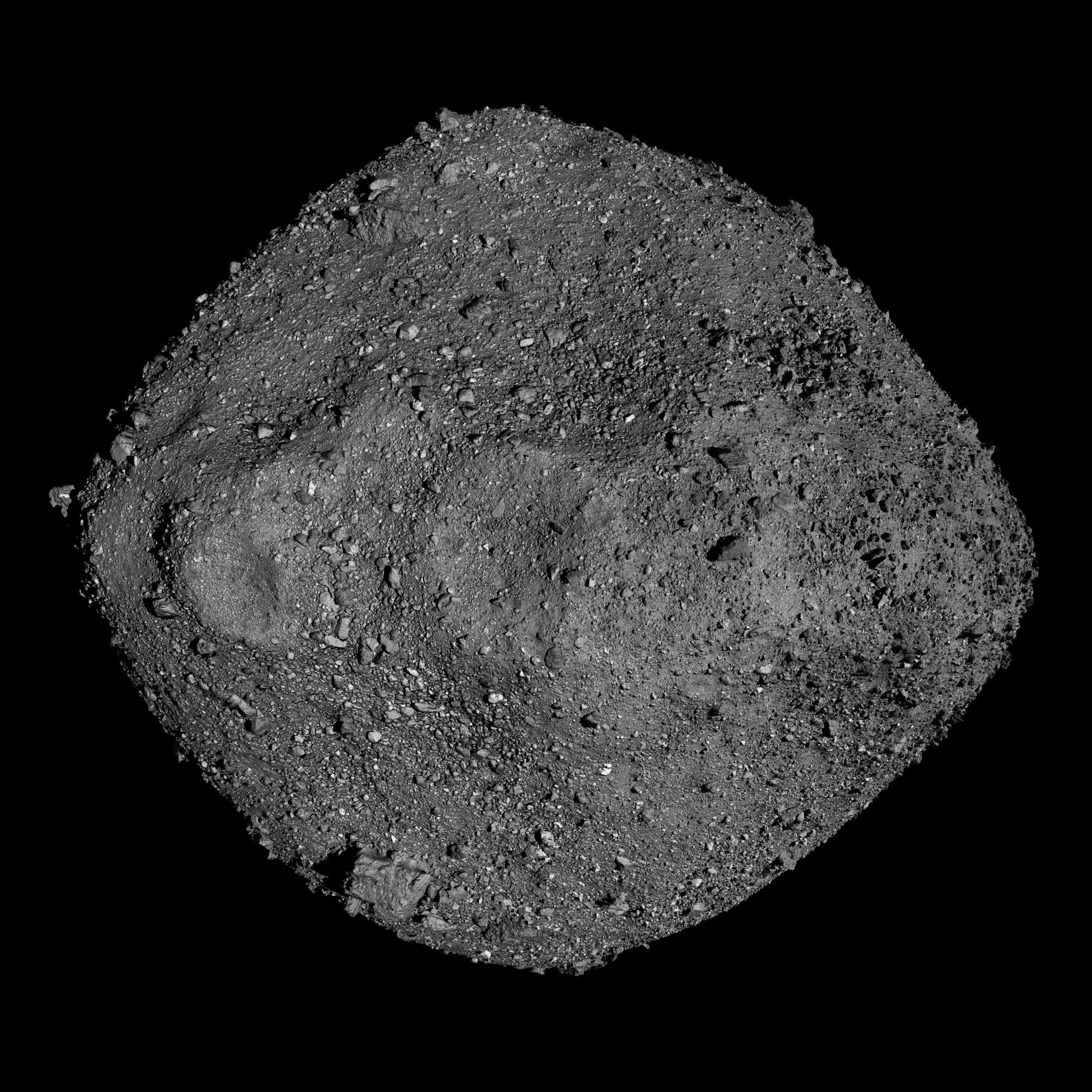
B-type asteroid Bennu imaged by OSIRIS-REx from a range of 24 km (15 mi)

B-type asteroids are a relatively uncommon type of carbonaceous asteroid, falling into the wider C-group; the 'B' indicates these objects are spectrally blue. In the asteroid population, B-class objects can be found in the outer asteroid belt, and also dominate the high-inclination Pallas family, which includes the third-largest asteroid 2 Pallas. They are thought to be primitive, volatile-rich remnants from the early Solar System. There are 65 known B-type asteroids in the SMASS classification, and 9 in the Tholen classification as of March 2015.

== Characteristics ==
Generally similar to the C-type objects, but differing in that the ultraviolet absorption below 0.5 μm is small or absent, and the spectrum is rather slightly bluish than reddish. The albedo also tends to be greater than in the generally very dark C type. Spectroscopy of B-class objects suggests major surface constituents of anhydrous silicates, hydrated clay minerals, organic polymers, magnetite, and sulfides. The closest matches to B-class asteroids have been obtained on carbonaceous chondrite meteorites that have been gently heated in the laboratory.

The majority of asteroids that have been observed to display cometary-like activity are B-types. Some of these objects display indications of aqueous alteration in the past, and they may have incorporated significant amounts of water ice.

== Well studied B-type asteroids ==
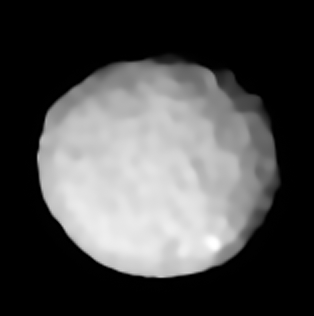
Pallas, the largest B-type asteroid

Asteroid 101955 Bennu is a B-type asteroid which is the target of the OSIRIS-REx mission. The mission sought to characterize the asteroid by mapping the surface, studying the Yarkovsky effect, and retrieving a sample of the asteroid to return in 2023. The spacecraft was launched in 2016 and explored Bennu between 2018 and 2021.

Other B-type asteroids include:

- 2 Pallas
- 24 Themis
- 47 Aglaja
- 59 Elpis
- 85 Io
- 88 Thisbe
- 142 Polana
- 213 Lilaea
- 241 Germania
- 282 Clorinde
- 335 Roberta
- 372 Palma
- 383 Janina
- 431 Nephele
- 531 Zerlina
- 541 Deborah
- 555 Norma
- 560 Delila
- 702 Alauda
- 704 Interamnia
- 767 Bondia
- 895 Helio
- 1021 Flammario
- 1331 Solvejg
- 1474 Beira
- 1484 Postrema
- 1539 Borrelly
- 1655 Comas Sola
- 1705 Tapio
- 1724 Vladimir
- 2382 Nonie
- 2446 Lunacharsky
- 2527 Gregory
- 2629 Rudra
- 2659 Millis
- 2708 Burns
- 2772 Dugan
- 2809 Vernadskij
- 2816 Pien
- 2973 Paola
- 3000 Leonardo
- 3074 Popov
- 3200 Phaethon
- 3566 Levitan
- 3579 Rockholt
- 3581 Alvarez
- 3627 Sayers
- 3647 Dermott
- 4124 Herriot
- 4396 Gressmann
- 4686 Maisica
- 4997 Ksana
- 5079 Brubeck
- 5102 Benfranklin
- 5133 Phillipadams
- 5222 Ioffe
- 5234 Sechenov
- 5330 Senrikyu
- 5344 Ryabov
- (5690) 1992 EU
- 6500 Kodaira
- (7753) 1988 XB
- (25330) 1999 KV4
- (65679) 1989 UQ
- (523972) 1999 CW8

== See also ==
- Asteroid spectral types
