= Frederick Pilcher =

American astronomer and retired physics professor

Frederick Pilcher (born 1939) is a retired physics professor and a prolific photometrist of minor planets at his private Organ Mesa Observatory (G50) in New Mexico, United States.

== Biography ==
A graduate of University of Kansas, Frederick Pilcher has been a long-time associate professor in the physics department at Illinois College in Jacksonville, Illinois, during 1962–2005. Since 1968 he has been observing and writing about asteroids and was a charter member of the Minor Planets Section of the Association of Lunar and Planetary Observers (ALPO) when founded in 1973. Later on, he assumed the post of Section Recorder and Coordinator at ALPO.

After his retirement he moved to New Mexico, United States, and established his Organ Mesa Observatory (G50) in 2007. The observatory is located approximately 5 miles southeast of Las Cruces, New Mexico, and is dedicated to photometric research on asteroids. At the observatory, he has since obtained more than 1100 rotational lightcurves. Pilcher is a member of the Astronomical Society of Las Cruces, which is known for its research on small Solar System body, and its prolific members such as Clyde Tombaugh and Berton L. Stevens, who discovered more than 50 minor planets at his Desert Moon Observatory (448) in La Cruces.

== Honors ==
The main-belt asteroid 1990 Pilcher, discovered by Karl Reinmuth in 1954, was named in his honor. The official naming citation was published by the Minor Planet Center on 8 April 1982 (M.P.C. 6833).

== See also ==
- 2807 Karl Marx, naming controversy
