= (589683) 2010 RF43 =

Trans-Neptunian object

(589683) 2010 RF_{43}
- 2010 RF_{43} imaged by the Hubble Space Telescope in September 2026, the bright dot in the center is 2010 RF_{43}

Discovery
- Discovered by: D. L. Rabinowitz; M. Schwamb; S. Tourtellotte
- Discovery site: La Silla Obs.
- Discovery date: 6 September 2010

Designations
- Minor planet category: TNO · SDO · distant

Orbital characteristics
- Epoch 31 May 2020 (JD 2459000.5)
- Uncertainty parameter 2
- Observation arc: 46.17 yr (~16,860 days)
- Earliest precovery date: 19 August 1976
- Aphelion: 61.903 AU
- Perihelion: 37.482 AU
- Semi-major axis: 49.692 AU
- Eccentricity: 0.2457
- Orbital period (sidereal): 350.30 yr (127,948 d)
- Mean anomaly: 97.520°
- Mean motion: 0° 0^{m} 10.08^{s} / day
- Inclination: 30.638°
- Longitude of ascending node: 25.320°
- Argument of perihelion: 193.480°
- Known satellites: 0

Physical characteristics
- Mean diameter: 656 km (estimate); 611 km (estimate)
- Mass: 1.355682×10^{20} kg (assumed)
- Geometric albedo: 0.124 (assumed); 0.10 (assumed)
- Spectral type: g′–r′ = 0.80±0.03 g′–i′ = 1.21±0.04 r′–i = 0.41±0.03
- Absolute magnitude (H): 3.80; 3.79

(589683) 2010 RF_{43} is a large trans-Neptunian object orbiting in the scattered disc in the outermost regions of the Solar System. The object was discovered on 9 September 2010, by American astronomers David Rabinowitz, Megan Schwamb and Suzanne Tourtellotte at ESO's La Silla Observatory in northern Chile.

The Hubble Space Telescope photographed 2010 RF_{43} on 10 September 2026, during a search for moons around large trans-Neptunian objects.

== Orbit and classification ==
2010 RF_{43} orbits the Sun at a distance of 37.5–61.9 AU once every 350 years and 4 months (127,948 days; semi-major axis of 49.7 AU). Its orbit has an eccentricity of 0.25 and an inclination of 31° with respect to the ecliptic. The body's observation arc begins with a precovery observation taken at Siding Spring Observatory in August 1976.

Due to its relatively high eccentricity and inclination, it is an object of the scattered disc rather than one of the regular Kuiper belt. However its perihelion of 37.5 AU is too low to make it a detached object, which typically stay above 40 AU and never come close to the orbit of Neptune.

== Numbering and naming ==
This minor planet was numbered by the Minor Planet Center on 20 September 2021, receiving the number 589683 in the minor planet catalog (M.P.C. 135075). As of January 2026, it has not been named.

== Physical characteristics ==
=== Size, mass and brightness ===
Johnston's Archive estimates a mean diameter of 656 kilometers (408 mi). Mike Brown estimates a diameter of 611 kilometers (380 mi). However, Mike Brown's estimate uses the outdated H of 4.2, not the newer 3.8.

2010 RF_{43}’s mass is unmeasured, as it is not known to have a moon, which means there is currently no way to measure its mass and density. However, assumptions can still be made. In a 2021 study, Muñoz Gutiérrez assumed a mass of 0.0227×10^{−3} 🜨 (which translates to 1.356×10^{20} kg) for 2010 RF_{43}.

=== Rotation period ===
As of 2026, no rotational lightcurve of this object has been obtained from photometric observations. The object's rotation period, pole and shape remain unknown. In 2013, Benecchi and colleagues put an upper bound of 0.08 mag on its lightcurve amplitude.

=== Surface and spectra ===
2010 RF_{43} has color indices of: g′−r′ 0.80 ± 0.03, g′−i′ 1.21 ± 0.04, and r′−i′ 0.41 ± 0.03. Its albedo has not been measured, but it has been estimated to be 0.10, and 0.124.
