= List of minor planets: 589001–590000 =

The following is a partial list of minor planets, running from minor-planet number 589001 through 590000, inclusive. The primary data for this and other partial lists is based on JPL's "Small-Body Orbital Elements" and data available from the Minor Planet Center. Critical list information is also provided by the MPC, unless otherwise specified from Lowell Observatory. A detailed description of the table's columns and additional sources are given on the main page including a complete list of every page in this series, and a statistical break-up on the dynamical classification of minor planets.

Also see the summary list of all named bodies in numerical and alphabetical order, and the corresponding naming citations for the number range of this particular list. New namings may only be added to this list after official publication, as the preannouncement of names is condemned by the Working Group for Small Bodies Nomenclature of the International Astronomical Union.

Near-Earth obj.	MBA (inner)	MBA (outer)	Centaur
Mars-crosser	MBA (middle)	Jupiter trojan	Trans-Neptunian obj.
Unclassified

== 589001–589100 ==
Designation			Discovery			Properties		Ref
Permanent	Provisional	Named after	Date	Site	Discoverer(s)	Category	Diam.	Ref
589001	2009 AB_{55}	—	January 1, 2009	Kitt Peak	Spacewatch	·	1.7 km	MPC; JPL
589002	2009 AU_{57}	—	January 18, 2013	Mount Lemmon	Mount Lemmon Survey	·	660 m	MPC; JPL
589003	2009 AV_{59}	—	January 3, 2009	Kitt Peak	Spacewatch	·	460 m	MPC; JPL
589004	2009 AG_{63}	—	January 1, 2009	Kitt Peak	Spacewatch	·	1.5 km	MPC; JPL
589005	2009 AZ_{63}	—	January 1, 2009	Kitt Peak	Spacewatch	·	580 m	MPC; JPL
589006	2009 BD_{19}	—	January 7, 2009	Kitt Peak	Spacewatch	·	670 m	MPC; JPL
589007	2009 BX_{19}	—	January 2, 2009	Mount Lemmon	Mount Lemmon Survey	·	710 m	MPC; JPL
589008	2009 BQ_{21}	—	January 16, 2009	Mount Lemmon	Mount Lemmon Survey	H	490 m	MPC; JPL
589009	2009 BX_{32}	—	January 16, 2009	Kitt Peak	Spacewatch	·	920 m	MPC; JPL
589010	2009 BY_{34}	—	January 16, 2009	Kitt Peak	Spacewatch	·	2.1 km	MPC; JPL
589011	2009 BQ_{35}	—	January 1, 2009	Mount Lemmon	Mount Lemmon Survey	·	1.5 km	MPC; JPL
589012	2009 BH_{41}	—	January 16, 2009	Kitt Peak	Spacewatch	AGN	1.3 km	MPC; JPL
589013	2009 BY_{50}	—	January 16, 2009	Mount Lemmon	Mount Lemmon Survey	MAS	590 m	MPC; JPL
589014	2009 BC_{53}	—	November 24, 2008	Mount Lemmon	Mount Lemmon Survey	DOR	2.6 km	MPC; JPL
589015	2009 BJ_{70}	—	November 21, 2008	Mount Lemmon	Mount Lemmon Survey	·	2.0 km	MPC; JPL
589016	2009 BR_{72}	—	January 17, 2009	Kitt Peak	Spacewatch	·	2.1 km	MPC; JPL
589017	2009 BF_{75}	—	September 12, 2007	Catalina	CSS	·	2.6 km	MPC; JPL
589018	2009 BW_{79}	—	January 31, 2009	Kitt Peak	Spacewatch	·	1.7 km	MPC; JPL
589019	2009 BH_{90}	—	January 3, 2009	Mount Lemmon	Mount Lemmon Survey	·	650 m	MPC; JPL
589020	2009 BQ_{91}	—	January 15, 2009	Kitt Peak	Spacewatch	·	700 m	MPC; JPL
589021	2009 BC_{102}	—	November 15, 2007	Mount Lemmon	Mount Lemmon Survey	·	1.9 km	MPC; JPL
589022	2009 BJ_{104}	—	January 25, 2009	Kitt Peak	Spacewatch	MAS	560 m	MPC; JPL
589023	2009 BX_{111}	—	January 29, 2009	Kitt Peak	Spacewatch	·	620 m	MPC; JPL
589024	2009 BU_{115}	—	September 12, 2007	Mount Lemmon	Mount Lemmon Survey	·	1.9 km	MPC; JPL
589025	2009 BQ_{116}	—	October 31, 2007	Mount Lemmon	Mount Lemmon Survey	·	1.9 km	MPC; JPL
589026	2009 BR_{135}	—	January 29, 2009	Kitt Peak	Spacewatch	V	390 m	MPC; JPL
589027	2009 BG_{136}	—	January 29, 2009	Kitt Peak	Spacewatch	·	1.4 km	MPC; JPL
589028	2009 BE_{148}	—	January 30, 2009	Mount Lemmon	Mount Lemmon Survey	·	580 m	MPC; JPL
589029	2009 BR_{151}	—	January 30, 2009	Mount Lemmon	Mount Lemmon Survey	V	600 m	MPC; JPL
589030	2009 BC_{158}	—	January 31, 2009	Kitt Peak	Spacewatch	·	1.8 km	MPC; JPL
589031	2009 BN_{160}	—	October 12, 2007	Mount Lemmon	Mount Lemmon Survey	·	1.7 km	MPC; JPL
589032	2009 BE_{163}	—	January 31, 2009	Kitt Peak	Spacewatch	·	1.6 km	MPC; JPL
589033	2009 BW_{163}	—	October 8, 2007	Mount Lemmon	Mount Lemmon Survey	AGN	1.4 km	MPC; JPL
589034	2009 BN_{164}	—	January 31, 2009	Kitt Peak	Spacewatch	·	560 m	MPC; JPL
589035	2009 BA_{165}	—	January 31, 2009	Kitt Peak	Spacewatch	·	620 m	MPC; JPL
589036	2009 BT_{170}	—	January 16, 2009	Mount Lemmon	Mount Lemmon Survey	·	1.7 km	MPC; JPL
589037	2009 BD_{174}	—	January 25, 2009	Kitt Peak	Spacewatch	MAS	550 m	MPC; JPL
589038	2009 BG_{178}	—	January 17, 2009	Kitt Peak	Spacewatch	·	800 m	MPC; JPL
589039	2009 BG_{193}	—	January 30, 2009	Mount Lemmon	Mount Lemmon Survey	NYS	890 m	MPC; JPL
589040	2009 BO_{193}	—	January 29, 2009	Mount Lemmon	Mount Lemmon Survey	·	2.1 km	MPC; JPL
589041	2009 BA_{194}	—	November 7, 2012	Mount Lemmon	Mount Lemmon Survey	526	2.3 km	MPC; JPL
589042	2009 BE_{194}	—	February 9, 2014	Mount Lemmon	Mount Lemmon Survey	·	1.9 km	MPC; JPL
589043	2009 BA_{196}	—	November 11, 2012	Nogales	M. Schwartz, P. R. Holvorcem	·	1.6 km	MPC; JPL
589044	2009 BB_{199}	—	January 31, 2009	Mount Lemmon	Mount Lemmon Survey	3:2	5.1 km	MPC; JPL
589045	2009 BD_{201}	—	January 25, 2009	Kitt Peak	Spacewatch	·	760 m	MPC; JPL
589046	2009 BJ_{203}	—	August 28, 2014	Haleakala	Pan-STARRS 1	·	690 m	MPC; JPL
589047	2009 BO_{203}	—	January 18, 2009	Mount Lemmon	Mount Lemmon Survey	H	400 m	MPC; JPL
589048	2009 BA_{207}	—	January 31, 2009	Kitt Peak	Spacewatch	V	470 m	MPC; JPL
589049	2009 BN_{207}	—	January 31, 2009	Mount Lemmon	Mount Lemmon Survey	·	730 m	MPC; JPL
589050	2009 BU_{208}	—	January 29, 2009	Mount Lemmon	Mount Lemmon Survey	·	790 m	MPC; JPL
589051	2009 BB_{209}	—	January 31, 2009	Mount Lemmon	Mount Lemmon Survey	·	1.7 km	MPC; JPL
589052	2009 BF_{209}	—	January 20, 2009	Kitt Peak	Spacewatch	KOR	1.1 km	MPC; JPL
589053	2009 BW_{210}	—	January 20, 2009	Kitt Peak	Spacewatch	MAS	480 m	MPC; JPL
589054	2009 CA_{10}	—	February 1, 2009	Mount Lemmon	Mount Lemmon Survey	PHO	660 m	MPC; JPL
589055	2009 CF_{10}	—	February 1, 2009	Mount Lemmon	Mount Lemmon Survey	·	950 m	MPC; JPL
589056	2009 CV_{10}	—	February 1, 2009	Mount Lemmon	Mount Lemmon Survey	·	660 m	MPC; JPL
589057	2009 CA_{16}	—	January 25, 2009	Kitt Peak	Spacewatch	·	1.7 km	MPC; JPL
589058	2009 CG_{21}	—	August 10, 2007	Kitt Peak	Spacewatch	·	680 m	MPC; JPL
589059	2009 CM_{25}	—	December 22, 2008	Mount Lemmon	Mount Lemmon Survey	·	1.7 km	MPC; JPL
589060	2009 CB_{33}	—	February 1, 2009	Kitt Peak	Spacewatch	NYS	670 m	MPC; JPL
589061	2009 CW_{36}	—	February 3, 2009	Kitt Peak	Spacewatch	·	930 m	MPC; JPL
589062	2009 CP_{37}	—	February 4, 2009	Mount Lemmon	Mount Lemmon Survey	·	510 m	MPC; JPL
589063	2009 CV_{37}	—	November 6, 2008	Mount Lemmon	Mount Lemmon Survey	·	2.6 km	MPC; JPL
589064	2009 CH_{40}	—	February 13, 2009	Kitt Peak	Spacewatch	·	540 m	MPC; JPL
589065	2009 CZ_{41}	—	January 15, 2009	Kitt Peak	Spacewatch	TIR	2.6 km	MPC; JPL
589066	2009 CE_{43}	—	February 14, 2009	Kitt Peak	Spacewatch	AGN	890 m	MPC; JPL
589067	2009 CK_{58}	—	February 3, 2009	Kitt Peak	Spacewatch	·	940 m	MPC; JPL
589068	2009 CY_{64}	—	February 14, 2009	Kitt Peak	Spacewatch	H	570 m	MPC; JPL
589069	2009 CU_{67}	—	April 11, 2010	Mount Lemmon	Mount Lemmon Survey	·	2.3 km	MPC; JPL
589070	2009 CB_{68}	—	November 4, 2007	Kitt Peak	Spacewatch	·	1.7 km	MPC; JPL
589071	2009 CC_{72}	—	February 5, 2009	Kitt Peak	Spacewatch	·	680 m	MPC; JPL
589072	2009 CQ_{74}	—	February 4, 2009	Kitt Peak	Spacewatch	·	1.1 km	MPC; JPL
589073	2009 CL_{76}	—	February 14, 2009	Kitt Peak	Spacewatch	·	740 m	MPC; JPL
589074	2009 DH	—	April 21, 2006	Kitt Peak	Spacewatch	·	2.0 km	MPC; JPL
589075	2009 DS_{4}	—	August 23, 2007	Kitt Peak	Spacewatch	·	1.6 km	MPC; JPL
589076	2009 DA_{10}	—	February 20, 2009	Calar Alto	F. Hormuth	·	810 m	MPC; JPL
589077	2009 DH_{13}	—	February 16, 2009	Kitt Peak	Spacewatch	·	880 m	MPC; JPL
589078	2009 DU_{13}	—	February 16, 2009	Kitt Peak	Spacewatch	ERI	1.2 km	MPC; JPL
589079	2009 DE_{19}	—	February 4, 2009	Mount Lemmon	Mount Lemmon Survey	·	590 m	MPC; JPL
589080	2009 DT_{21}	—	September 10, 2007	Kitt Peak	Spacewatch	·	1.7 km	MPC; JPL
589081	2009 DD_{25}	—	February 21, 2009	Mount Lemmon	Mount Lemmon Survey	·	990 m	MPC; JPL
589082	2009 DE_{25}	—	November 16, 2003	Kitt Peak	Spacewatch	·	1.1 km	MPC; JPL
589083	2009 DW_{48}	—	January 1, 2009	Mount Lemmon	Mount Lemmon Survey	·	1.6 km	MPC; JPL
589084	2009 DQ_{51}	—	February 1, 2009	Kitt Peak	Spacewatch	·	680 m	MPC; JPL
589085	2009 DZ_{61}	—	February 22, 2009	Kitt Peak	Spacewatch	·	2.4 km	MPC; JPL
589086	2009 DU_{66}	—	October 9, 2007	Mount Lemmon	Mount Lemmon Survey	·	1.8 km	MPC; JPL
589087	2009 DF_{67}	—	February 24, 2009	Calar Alto	F. Hormuth	·	680 m	MPC; JPL
589088	2009 DM_{67}	—	February 3, 2009	Kitt Peak	Spacewatch	·	830 m	MPC; JPL
589089	2009 DE_{69}	—	January 1, 2009	Kitt Peak	Spacewatch	·	490 m	MPC; JPL
589090	2009 DM_{69}	—	January 31, 2009	Kitt Peak	Spacewatch	·	1.0 km	MPC; JPL
589091	2009 DX_{89}	—	February 13, 2002	Kitt Peak	Spacewatch	MAS	620 m	MPC; JPL
589092	2009 DG_{91}	—	February 27, 2009	Mount Lemmon	Mount Lemmon Survey	·	1.5 km	MPC; JPL
589093	2009 DX_{92}	—	February 28, 2009	Mount Lemmon	Mount Lemmon Survey	·	760 m	MPC; JPL
589094	2009 DM_{93}	—	February 28, 2009	Mount Lemmon	Mount Lemmon Survey	EOS	1.2 km	MPC; JPL
589095	2009 DQ_{99}	—	February 26, 2009	Kitt Peak	Spacewatch	·	1.8 km	MPC; JPL
589096	2009 DC_{103}	—	February 26, 2009	Kitt Peak	Spacewatch	·	700 m	MPC; JPL
589097	2009 DX_{112}	—	February 1, 2009	Kitt Peak	Spacewatch	MAS	540 m	MPC; JPL
589098	2009 DH_{120}	—	February 19, 2009	Kitt Peak	Spacewatch	MAS	670 m	MPC; JPL
589099	2009 DB_{123}	—	February 28, 2009	Kitt Peak	Spacewatch	NYS	740 m	MPC; JPL
589100	2009 DE_{138}	—	February 20, 2009	Kitt Peak	Spacewatch	·	1.1 km	MPC; JPL

== 589101–589200 ==
back to top

Designation			Discovery			Properties		Ref
Permanent	Provisional	Named after	Date	Site	Discoverer(s)	Category	Diam.	Ref
589101	2009 DR_{142}	—	February 21, 2009	Catalina	CSS	·	1.0 km	MPC; JPL
589102	2009 DM_{147}	—	February 27, 2009	Catalina	CSS	ERI	1.3 km	MPC; JPL
589103	2009 DW_{148}	—	February 26, 2009	Calar Alto	F. Hormuth	·	2.4 km	MPC; JPL
589104	2009 DB_{149}	—	January 28, 2009	Kitt Peak	Spacewatch	·	660 m	MPC; JPL
589105	2009 DL_{149}	—	December 23, 2012	Haleakala	Pan-STARRS 1	·	860 m	MPC; JPL
589106	2009 DP_{149}	—	November 3, 2011	Kitt Peak	Spacewatch	NYS	970 m	MPC; JPL
589107	2009 DT_{150}	—	February 20, 2009	Kitt Peak	Spacewatch	·	700 m	MPC; JPL
589108	2009 DR_{154}	—	February 28, 2009	Kitt Peak	Spacewatch	ERI	1.0 km	MPC; JPL
589109	2009 DK_{155}	—	February 21, 2009	Kitt Peak	Spacewatch	·	860 m	MPC; JPL
589110	2009 DO_{155}	—	February 28, 2009	Kitt Peak	Spacewatch	KOR	1.2 km	MPC; JPL
589111	2009 DW_{155}	—	February 22, 2009	Mount Lemmon	Mount Lemmon Survey	·	1.5 km	MPC; JPL
589112	2009 DC_{156}	—	November 5, 2007	Kitt Peak	Spacewatch	·	1.4 km	MPC; JPL
589113	2009 ED_{5}	—	December 22, 2008	Mount Lemmon	Mount Lemmon Survey	·	750 m	MPC; JPL
589114	2009 EU_{8}	—	March 2, 2009	Kitt Peak	Spacewatch	·	710 m	MPC; JPL
589115	2009 ES_{12}	—	February 1, 2009	Catalina	CSS	·	1.8 km	MPC; JPL
589116	2009 EE_{14}	—	March 15, 2009	Mount Lemmon	Mount Lemmon Survey	·	1.5 km	MPC; JPL
589117	2009 ES_{25}	—	December 4, 2007	Kitt Peak	Spacewatch	·	1.8 km	MPC; JPL
589118	2009 EW_{28}	—	March 15, 2009	Kitt Peak	Spacewatch	·	1 km	MPC; JPL
589119	2009 EL_{30}	—	March 3, 2009	Mount Lemmon	Mount Lemmon Survey	·	1.4 km	MPC; JPL
589120	2009 EP_{32}	—	March 2, 2009	Mount Lemmon	Mount Lemmon Survey	V	670 m	MPC; JPL
589121	2009 EB_{34}	—	March 2, 2009	Kitt Peak	Spacewatch	MAS	560 m	MPC; JPL
589122	2009 EE_{38}	—	September 20, 2011	Mount Lemmon	Mount Lemmon Survey	·	1.6 km	MPC; JPL
589123	2009 EU_{38}	—	March 2, 2009	Kitt Peak	Spacewatch	·	1.6 km	MPC; JPL
589124	2009 EO_{39}	—	March 8, 2009	Mount Lemmon	Mount Lemmon Survey	H	420 m	MPC; JPL
589125	2009 EW_{41}	—	March 3, 2009	Mount Lemmon	Mount Lemmon Survey	·	1.7 km	MPC; JPL
589126	2009 FS_{10}	—	March 18, 2009	Mount Lemmon	Mount Lemmon Survey	·	1.2 km	MPC; JPL
589127	2009 FX_{38}	—	February 14, 2009	Mount Lemmon	Mount Lemmon Survey	BRA	1.5 km	MPC; JPL
589128	2009 FP_{48}	—	March 1, 2009	Mount Lemmon	Mount Lemmon Survey	·	890 m	MPC; JPL
589129	2009 FU_{49}	—	February 19, 2009	Kitt Peak	Spacewatch	·	830 m	MPC; JPL
589130	2009 FC_{51}	—	March 28, 2009	Kitt Peak	Spacewatch	·	1.0 km	MPC; JPL
589131	2009 FK_{52}	—	March 28, 2009	Mount Lemmon	Mount Lemmon Survey	·	1.9 km	MPC; JPL
589132	2009 FN_{68}	—	March 26, 2009	Mount Lemmon	Mount Lemmon Survey	BRA	1.2 km	MPC; JPL
589133	2009 FU_{73}	—	March 28, 2009	Kitt Peak	Spacewatch	·	1.0 km	MPC; JPL
589134	2009 FT_{81}	—	March 24, 2009	Mount Lemmon	Mount Lemmon Survey	·	2.0 km	MPC; JPL
589135	2009 FC_{82}	—	February 28, 2014	Haleakala	Pan-STARRS 1	·	1.9 km	MPC; JPL
589136	2009 FW_{82}	—	November 12, 2012	Mount Lemmon	Mount Lemmon Survey	·	1.5 km	MPC; JPL
589137	2009 FS_{83}	—	February 19, 2009	Kitt Peak	Spacewatch	NYS	570 m	MPC; JPL
589138	2009 FS_{84}	—	February 24, 2009	Kitt Peak	Spacewatch	MAS	490 m	MPC; JPL
589139	2009 FT_{86}	—	September 18, 2011	Mount Lemmon	Mount Lemmon Survey	KOR	1.1 km	MPC; JPL
589140	2009 FE_{88}	—	February 19, 2009	Mount Lemmon	Mount Lemmon Survey	·	600 m	MPC; JPL
589141	2009 FH_{88}	—	March 22, 2009	Mount Lemmon	Mount Lemmon Survey	·	800 m	MPC; JPL
589142	2009 FC_{90}	—	September 30, 2003	Kitt Peak	Spacewatch	PHO	960 m	MPC; JPL
589143	2009 FL_{91}	—	March 16, 2009	Mount Lemmon	Mount Lemmon Survey	·	750 m	MPC; JPL
589144	2009 FU_{91}	—	March 22, 2009	Mount Lemmon	Mount Lemmon Survey	·	1.8 km	MPC; JPL
589145	2009 FL_{94}	—	March 19, 2009	Kitt Peak	Spacewatch	EOS	1.4 km	MPC; JPL
589146	2009 GR_{6}	—	September 13, 2007	Kitt Peak	Spacewatch	H	460 m	MPC; JPL
589147	2009 GW_{7}	—	February 1, 2016	Haleakala	Pan-STARRS 1	·	830 m	MPC; JPL
589148	2009 HZ_{9}	—	March 26, 2009	Kitt Peak	Spacewatch	·	1 km	MPC; JPL
589149	2009 HB_{14}	—	April 17, 2009	Kitt Peak	Spacewatch	·	1.5 km	MPC; JPL
589150	2009 HE_{16}	—	August 24, 2003	Cerro Tololo	Deep Ecliptic Survey	·	710 m	MPC; JPL
589151	2009 HB_{19}	—	April 19, 2009	Mount Lemmon	Mount Lemmon Survey	·	770 m	MPC; JPL
589152	2009 HR_{23}	—	August 9, 2005	Cerro Tololo	Deep Ecliptic Survey	·	1.7 km	MPC; JPL
589153	2009 HW_{23}	—	April 17, 2009	Mount Lemmon	Mount Lemmon Survey	KOR	1.3 km	MPC; JPL
589154	2009 HO_{29}	—	April 2, 2009	Mount Lemmon	Mount Lemmon Survey	EOS	1.3 km	MPC; JPL
589155	2009 HE_{31}	—	March 7, 2009	Mount Lemmon	Mount Lemmon Survey	·	940 m	MPC; JPL
589156	2009 HL_{31}	—	April 19, 2009	Kitt Peak	Spacewatch	·	900 m	MPC; JPL
589157	2009 HA_{34}	—	March 28, 2009	Kitt Peak	Spacewatch	MAS	570 m	MPC; JPL
589158	2009 HG_{39}	—	April 18, 2009	Kitt Peak	Spacewatch	·	1.8 km	MPC; JPL
589159	2009 HL_{39}	—	March 1, 2005	Kitt Peak	Spacewatch	NYS	1.4 km	MPC; JPL
589160	2009 HD_{40}	—	April 2, 2009	Mount Lemmon	Mount Lemmon Survey	BRA	1.5 km	MPC; JPL
589161	2009 HE_{42}	—	April 20, 2009	Kitt Peak	Spacewatch	AGN	1.0 km	MPC; JPL
589162	2009 HY_{43}	—	October 28, 2006	Mount Lemmon	Mount Lemmon Survey	EOS	1.8 km	MPC; JPL
589163	2009 HD_{54}	—	April 20, 2009	Mount Lemmon	Mount Lemmon Survey	·	1.1 km	MPC; JPL
589164	2009 HT_{66}	—	March 4, 2005	Kitt Peak	Spacewatch	·	1.2 km	MPC; JPL
589165	2009 HF_{72}	—	April 26, 2009	Mount Lemmon	Mount Lemmon Survey	·	1.0 km	MPC; JPL
589166	2009 HF_{80}	—	March 18, 2009	Kitt Peak	Spacewatch	·	910 m	MPC; JPL
589167	2009 HH_{95}	—	April 30, 2009	Cerro Burek	Burek, Cerro	·	2.1 km	MPC; JPL
589168	2009 HJ_{101}	—	April 27, 2009	Mount Lemmon	Mount Lemmon Survey	MAS	650 m	MPC; JPL
589169	2009 HB_{109}	—	April 20, 2009	Mount Lemmon	Mount Lemmon Survey	·	2.2 km	MPC; JPL
589170	2009 HP_{111}	—	April 28, 2009	Mount Lemmon	Mount Lemmon Survey	·	1.2 km	MPC; JPL
589171	2009 HJ_{112}	—	April 29, 2009	Mount Lemmon	Mount Lemmon Survey	·	1.1 km	MPC; JPL
589172	2009 HE_{113}	—	April 30, 2009	Kitt Peak	Spacewatch	·	950 m	MPC; JPL
589173	2009 HJ_{115}	—	April 20, 2009	Mount Lemmon	Mount Lemmon Survey	PHO	660 m	MPC; JPL
589174	2009 HX_{115}	—	April 22, 2009	Mount Lemmon	Mount Lemmon Survey	·	1.7 km	MPC; JPL
589175 Romainguélat	2009 HN_{118}	Romainguélat	April 7, 2013	Oukaïmeden	M. Ory	·	1.1 km	MPC; JPL
589176	2009 HK_{119}	—	April 22, 2009	Mount Lemmon	Mount Lemmon Survey	MAS	560 m	MPC; JPL
589177	2009 HL_{120}	—	January 8, 2013	Oukaïmeden	M. Ory	·	1.6 km	MPC; JPL
589178	2009 HQ_{121}	—	April 17, 2009	Kitt Peak	Spacewatch	·	1.0 km	MPC; JPL
589179	2009 HX_{121}	—	April 29, 2009	Mount Lemmon	Mount Lemmon Survey	·	1.8 km	MPC; JPL
589180	2009 HW_{122}	—	April 19, 2009	Mount Lemmon	Mount Lemmon Survey	·	2.0 km	MPC; JPL
589181	2009 HR_{124}	—	April 23, 2009	Kitt Peak	Spacewatch	THB	2.4 km	MPC; JPL
589182	2009 HD_{126}	—	April 27, 2009	Kitt Peak	Spacewatch	·	2.1 km	MPC; JPL
589183	2009 JJ_{18}	—	May 15, 2009	Kitt Peak	Spacewatch	·	1.3 km	MPC; JPL
589184	2009 JX_{21}	—	May 15, 2009	Kitt Peak	Spacewatch	·	2.2 km	MPC; JPL
589185	2009 KN_{1}	—	April 20, 2009	Kitt Peak	Spacewatch	·	1.9 km	MPC; JPL
589186	2009 KW_{5}	—	March 24, 2009	Mount Lemmon	Mount Lemmon Survey	·	2.6 km	MPC; JPL
589187	2009 KV_{18}	—	February 7, 2008	Kitt Peak	Spacewatch	·	2.7 km	MPC; JPL
589188	2009 KZ_{18}	—	March 11, 2005	Mount Lemmon	Mount Lemmon Survey	NYS	900 m	MPC; JPL
589189	2009 KA_{19}	—	April 27, 2009	Mount Lemmon	Mount Lemmon Survey	LIX	2.6 km	MPC; JPL
589190	2009 KX_{20}	—	May 29, 2009	Mount Lemmon	Mount Lemmon Survey	·	1.8 km	MPC; JPL
589191	2009 KS_{26}	—	May 4, 2009	Mount Lemmon	Mount Lemmon Survey	EOS	1.6 km	MPC; JPL
589192	2009 KU_{38}	—	April 6, 2014	Mount Lemmon	Mount Lemmon Survey	·	2.5 km	MPC; JPL
589193	2009 KX_{38}	—	November 16, 1995	Kitt Peak	Spacewatch	EOS	1.6 km	MPC; JPL
589194	2009 KK_{39}	—	May 25, 2009	Kitt Peak	Spacewatch	·	980 m	MPC; JPL
589195	2009 KU_{39}	—	January 13, 2016	Haleakala	Pan-STARRS 1	·	1.1 km	MPC; JPL
589196	2009 LD_{3}	—	April 19, 2009	Kitt Peak	Spacewatch	·	2.6 km	MPC; JPL
589197	2009 LQ_{3}	—	May 2, 2009	Mount Lemmon	Mount Lemmon Survey	EOS	2.0 km	MPC; JPL
589198	2009 LZ_{3}	—	June 12, 2009	Kitt Peak	Spacewatch	·	2.4 km	MPC; JPL
589199	2009 LB_{8}	—	July 14, 2013	Haleakala	Pan-STARRS 1	·	980 m	MPC; JPL
589200	2009 ML	—	June 16, 2009	XuYi	PMO NEO Survey Program	PHO	1.2 km	MPC; JPL

== 589201–589300 ==
back to top

Designation			Discovery			Properties		Ref
Permanent	Provisional	Named after	Date	Site	Discoverer(s)	Category	Diam.	Ref
589201	2009 MX_{1}	—	April 14, 2005	Catalina	CSS	PHO	880 m	MPC; JPL
589202	2009 MR_{5}	—	June 21, 2009	Mount Lemmon	Mount Lemmon Survey	EUP	3.7 km	MPC; JPL
589203	2009 MT_{5}	—	June 21, 2009	Mount Lemmon	Mount Lemmon Survey	NYS	970 m	MPC; JPL
589204	2009 MK_{10}	—	September 21, 2009	Catalina	CSS	·	1.4 km	MPC; JPL
589205	2009 MZ_{10}	—	June 22, 2009	Kitt Peak	Spacewatch	·	1.7 km	MPC; JPL
589206	2009 MT_{11}	—	June 17, 2009	Mount Lemmon	Mount Lemmon Survey	JUN	660 m	MPC; JPL
589207	2009 MW_{11}	—	November 2, 2010	Mount Lemmon	Mount Lemmon Survey	·	2.4 km	MPC; JPL
589208	2009 MH_{12}	—	February 18, 2013	Nogales	M. Schwartz, P. R. Holvorcem	·	3.4 km	MPC; JPL
589209	2009 NZ_{1}	—	July 13, 2009	Kitt Peak	Spacewatch	·	970 m	MPC; JPL
589210	2009 OD_{8}	—	July 27, 2009	Catalina	CSS	·	3.4 km	MPC; JPL
589211	2009 OU_{10}	—	January 27, 2007	Kitt Peak	Spacewatch	·	3.3 km	MPC; JPL
589212	2009 ON_{16}	—	July 28, 2009	Kitt Peak	Spacewatch	·	2.6 km	MPC; JPL
589213	2009 OW_{17}	—	December 30, 2005	Kitt Peak	Spacewatch	·	2.4 km	MPC; JPL
589214	2009 OP_{26}	—	July 28, 2009	Kitt Peak	Spacewatch	·	580 m	MPC; JPL
589215	2009 OF_{28}	—	July 27, 2009	Catalina	CSS	·	3.1 km	MPC; JPL
589216	2009 OL_{28}	—	July 27, 2009	Kitt Peak	Spacewatch	·	2.7 km	MPC; JPL
589217	2009 PH_{1}	—	April 3, 2008	Kitt Peak	Spacewatch	·	1.4 km	MPC; JPL
589218	2009 PN_{1}	—	August 14, 2009	Dauban	C. Rinner, Kugel, F.	·	2.6 km	MPC; JPL
589219	2009 PW_{8}	—	August 15, 2009	Catalina	CSS	·	2.8 km	MPC; JPL
589220	2009 PA_{22}	—	January 19, 2012	Haleakala	Pan-STARRS 1	·	3.1 km	MPC; JPL
589221	2009 PK_{22}	—	February 16, 2012	Haleakala	Pan-STARRS 1	·	2.3 km	MPC; JPL
589222	2009 QT_{1}	—	February 17, 2007	Kitt Peak	Spacewatch	·	3.7 km	MPC; JPL
589223	2009 QR_{2}	—	August 16, 2009	Kitt Peak	Spacewatch	·	2.9 km	MPC; JPL
589224	2009 QB_{3}	—	August 16, 2009	Goodricke-Pigott	R. A. Tucker	·	4.2 km	MPC; JPL
589225	2009 QS_{3}	—	April 21, 2009	Kitt Peak	Spacewatch	·	2.4 km	MPC; JPL
589226	2009 QB_{7}	—	August 17, 2009	Črni Vrh	Matičič, S.	·	2.6 km	MPC; JPL
589227	2009 QY_{18}	—	November 7, 2005	Mauna Kea	A. Boattini	HYG	2.9 km	MPC; JPL
589228	2009 QU_{25}	—	July 14, 2009	Kitt Peak	Spacewatch	·	3.4 km	MPC; JPL
589229	2009 QW_{26}	—	August 22, 2009	Dauban	C. Rinner, Kugel, F.	·	3.3 km	MPC; JPL
589230	2009 QR_{60}	—	August 19, 2009	Kitt Peak	Spacewatch	PHO	840 m	MPC; JPL
589231	2009 QA_{64}	—	August 18, 2009	La Sagra	OAM	EUN	980 m	MPC; JPL
589232	2009 QE_{65}	—	February 26, 2012	Mount Lemmon	Mount Lemmon Survey	·	3.8 km	MPC; JPL
589233	2009 QQ_{66}	—	April 29, 2012	Mount Lemmon	Mount Lemmon Survey	(5)	1.2 km	MPC; JPL
589234	2009 QS_{66}	—	September 6, 2013	La Sagra	OAM	·	1.1 km	MPC; JPL
589235	2009 QL_{68}	—	August 27, 2009	Kitt Peak	Spacewatch	·	2.3 km	MPC; JPL
589236	2009 QY_{70}	—	August 29, 2009	Kitt Peak	Spacewatch	·	2.7 km	MPC; JPL
589237	2009 QU_{71}	—	August 27, 2009	Kitt Peak	Spacewatch	MAS	590 m	MPC; JPL
589238	2009 QR_{72}	—	August 17, 2009	Kitt Peak	Spacewatch	·	1.1 km	MPC; JPL
589239	2009 QO_{73}	—	August 27, 2009	Kitt Peak	Spacewatch	EOS	1.7 km	MPC; JPL
589240	2009 QG_{78}	—	August 18, 2009	Kitt Peak	Spacewatch	·	1.2 km	MPC; JPL
589241	2009 RX_{18}	—	December 15, 2006	Mount Lemmon	Mount Lemmon Survey	NYS	1.5 km	MPC; JPL
589242	2009 RN_{29}	—	March 16, 2007	Kitt Peak	Spacewatch	·	2.9 km	MPC; JPL
589243	2009 RE_{55}	—	October 1, 2005	Kitt Peak	Spacewatch	·	1.6 km	MPC; JPL
589244	2009 RK_{63}	—	September 14, 2009	Kitt Peak	Spacewatch	L4 · 006	10 km	MPC; JPL
589245	2009 RK_{67}	—	September 15, 2009	Kitt Peak	Spacewatch	·	1.6 km	MPC; JPL
589246	2009 RJ_{68}	—	September 15, 2009	Kitt Peak	Spacewatch	L4	9.9 km	MPC; JPL
589247	2009 RC_{77}	—	January 23, 2006	Kitt Peak	Spacewatch	HYG	2.9 km	MPC; JPL
589248	2009 RG_{77}	—	September 15, 2009	Mount Lemmon	Mount Lemmon Survey	·	2.9 km	MPC; JPL
589249	2009 RF_{79}	—	February 16, 2012	Haleakala	Pan-STARRS 1	·	2.8 km	MPC; JPL
589250	2009 RP_{79}	—	February 10, 2016	Haleakala	Pan-STARRS 1	L4	6.9 km	MPC; JPL
589251	2009 RG_{80}	—	September 15, 2009	Mount Lemmon	Mount Lemmon Survey	EOS	2.1 km	MPC; JPL
589252	2009 RJ_{81}	—	September 15, 2009	Kitt Peak	Spacewatch	L4	6.6 km	MPC; JPL
589253 Fabrika	2009 SY_{1}	Fabrika	September 17, 2009	Zelenchukskaya Station	T. V. Krjačko, B. Satovski	MAR	1.3 km	MPC; JPL
589254	2009 SV_{6}	—	September 16, 2009	Mount Lemmon	Mount Lemmon Survey	VER	2.1 km	MPC; JPL
589255	2009 SA_{14}	—	September 17, 2009	Zelenchukskaya Station	T. V. Krjačko, B. Satovski	·	1.3 km	MPC; JPL
589256	2009 SQ_{27}	—	September 16, 2009	Kitt Peak	Spacewatch	L4	7.6 km	MPC; JPL
589257	2009 ST_{27}	—	September 16, 2009	Kitt Peak	Spacewatch	L4	8.3 km	MPC; JPL
589258	2009 SD_{28}	—	September 16, 2009	Kitt Peak	Spacewatch	L4	6.4 km	MPC; JPL
589259	2009 ST_{37}	—	September 16, 2009	Kitt Peak	Spacewatch	·	2.5 km	MPC; JPL
589260	2009 SR_{43}	—	September 16, 2009	Kitt Peak	Spacewatch	·	890 m	MPC; JPL
589261	2009 SC_{57}	—	September 17, 2009	Kitt Peak	Spacewatch	H	300 m	MPC; JPL
589262	2009 SX_{87}	—	September 18, 2009	Kitt Peak	Spacewatch	·	1.1 km	MPC; JPL
589263	2009 SZ_{105}	—	September 16, 2009	Mount Lemmon	Mount Lemmon Survey	TIR	2.4 km	MPC; JPL
589264	2009 SO_{107}	—	September 16, 2009	Kitt Peak	Spacewatch	·	2.9 km	MPC; JPL
589265	2009 SD_{109}	—	September 17, 2009	Mount Lemmon	Mount Lemmon Survey	·	770 m	MPC; JPL
589266	2009 SK_{122}	—	September 18, 2009	Kitt Peak	Spacewatch	·	610 m	MPC; JPL
589267	2009 ST_{122}	—	March 10, 2008	Kitt Peak	Spacewatch	·	1.2 km	MPC; JPL
589268	2009 ST_{126}	—	February 23, 2003	Kitt Peak	Spacewatch	·	1.0 km	MPC; JPL
589269	2009 SL_{140}	—	September 19, 2009	Kitt Peak	Spacewatch	·	3.4 km	MPC; JPL
589270	2009 SG_{146}	—	September 19, 2009	Mount Lemmon	Mount Lemmon Survey	·	1.0 km	MPC; JPL
589271	2009 SB_{153}	—	August 16, 2009	Kitt Peak	Spacewatch	·	1.4 km	MPC; JPL
589272	2009 SN_{153}	—	September 12, 2009	Kitt Peak	Spacewatch	L4	8.3 km	MPC; JPL
589273	2009 SO_{157}	—	September 20, 2009	Kitt Peak	Spacewatch	·	1.7 km	MPC; JPL
589274	2009 SH_{160}	—	September 20, 2009	Kitt Peak	Spacewatch	L4	7.3 km	MPC; JPL
589275	2009 SY_{173}	—	September 18, 2009	Mount Lemmon	Mount Lemmon Survey	·	2.6 km	MPC; JPL
589276	2009 SM_{188}	—	September 21, 2009	Kitt Peak	Spacewatch	L4 · ERY	6.7 km	MPC; JPL
589277	2009 SB_{190}	—	September 22, 2009	Kitt Peak	Spacewatch	L4	6.7 km	MPC; JPL
589278	2009 SK_{193}	—	September 18, 2009	Kitt Peak	Spacewatch	L4	7.0 km	MPC; JPL
589279	2009 SJ_{194}	—	September 22, 2009	Kitt Peak	Spacewatch	L4	6.7 km	MPC; JPL
589280	2009 SA_{221}	—	September 2, 2005	Palomar	NEAT	·	1.2 km	MPC; JPL
589281	2009 SP_{226}	—	August 18, 2009	Kitt Peak	Spacewatch	·	2.1 km	MPC; JPL
589282	2009 SQ_{226}	—	September 26, 2009	Mount Lemmon	Mount Lemmon Survey	·	1.9 km	MPC; JPL
589283	2009 SO_{233}	—	October 10, 2004	Kitt Peak	Deep Ecliptic Survey	·	1.7 km	MPC; JPL
589284	2009 SK_{246}	—	September 17, 2009	Kitt Peak	Spacewatch	L4	6.3 km	MPC; JPL
589285	2009 SC_{254}	—	May 1, 2006	Kitt Peak	Spacewatch	TIR	3.2 km	MPC; JPL
589286	2009 SD_{264}	—	November 3, 2004	Kitt Peak	Spacewatch	·	2.9 km	MPC; JPL
589287	2009 SA_{278}	—	September 25, 2009	Kitt Peak	Spacewatch	L4	8.3 km	MPC; JPL
589288	2009 SG_{286}	—	January 8, 2006	Mount Lemmon	Mount Lemmon Survey	·	2.1 km	MPC; JPL
589289	2009 SB_{296}	—	September 27, 2009	Mount Lemmon	Mount Lemmon Survey	L4	9.0 km	MPC; JPL
589290	2009 SN_{297}	—	September 28, 2009	Sandlot	G. Hug	·	850 m	MPC; JPL
589291	2009 SV_{303}	—	September 16, 2009	Kitt Peak	Spacewatch	L4	7.6 km	MPC; JPL
589292	2009 SU_{307}	—	September 7, 2008	Mount Lemmon	Mount Lemmon Survey	L4	7.5 km	MPC; JPL
589293	2009 SO_{308}	—	September 18, 2009	Kitt Peak	Spacewatch	·	3.0 km	MPC; JPL
589294	2009 SU_{308}	—	August 15, 2009	Kitt Peak	Spacewatch	EOS	1.7 km	MPC; JPL
589295	2009 SY_{319}	—	September 20, 2009	Kitt Peak	Spacewatch	L4	6.8 km	MPC; JPL
589296	2009 SV_{324}	—	September 25, 2009	Kitt Peak	Spacewatch	·	2.3 km	MPC; JPL
589297	2009 SL_{337}	—	February 12, 2003	Haleakala	NEAT	·	2.0 km	MPC; JPL
589298	2009 SJ_{372}	—	April 15, 2007	Mount Lemmon	Mount Lemmon Survey	·	3.2 km	MPC; JPL
589299	2009 SK_{372}	—	October 10, 1997	Kitt Peak	Spacewatch	L4	8.5 km	MPC; JPL
589300	2009 SN_{372}	—	September 24, 2009	Mount Lemmon	Mount Lemmon Survey	·	1 km	MPC; JPL

== 589301–589400 ==
back to top

Designation			Discovery			Properties		Ref
Permanent	Provisional	Named after	Date	Site	Discoverer(s)	Category	Diam.	Ref
589301	2009 SL_{373}	—	September 27, 2009	Kitt Peak	Spacewatch	·	990 m	MPC; JPL
589302	2009 SY_{373}	—	September 29, 2009	Mount Lemmon	Mount Lemmon Survey	L4 · ERY	9.5 km	MPC; JPL
589303	2009 SD_{374}	—	September 16, 2009	Mount Lemmon	Mount Lemmon Survey	·	3.6 km	MPC; JPL
589304	2009 SB_{375}	—	April 3, 2011	Haleakala	Pan-STARRS 1	·	860 m	MPC; JPL
589305	2009 SM_{375}	—	September 17, 2009	Kitt Peak	Spacewatch	·	680 m	MPC; JPL
589306	2009 SP_{375}	—	September 20, 2009	Kitt Peak	Spacewatch	L4	6.4 km	MPC; JPL
589307	2009 SR_{375}	—	September 4, 2013	Calar Alto	F. Hormuth	·	800 m	MPC; JPL
589308	2009 SX_{375}	—	November 2, 2010	Mount Lemmon	Mount Lemmon Survey	L4	8.2 km	MPC; JPL
589309	2009 SU_{376}	—	September 10, 2013	Haleakala	Pan-STARRS 1	·	980 m	MPC; JPL
589310	2009 SY_{378}	—	February 27, 2012	Haleakala	Pan-STARRS 1	·	2.4 km	MPC; JPL
589311	2009 SM_{380}	—	August 20, 2009	Kitt Peak	Spacewatch	L4	6.8 km	MPC; JPL
589312	2009 SL_{383}	—	January 17, 2013	Kitt Peak	Spacewatch	L4	8.5 km	MPC; JPL
589313	2009 SL_{384}	—	March 16, 2012	Mount Lemmon	Mount Lemmon Survey	·	2.6 km	MPC; JPL
589314	2009 SK_{387}	—	September 29, 2009	Mount Lemmon	Mount Lemmon Survey	EOS	1.4 km	MPC; JPL
589315	2009 SJ_{389}	—	September 29, 2009	Mount Lemmon	Mount Lemmon Survey	L4	7.5 km	MPC; JPL
589316	2009 SU_{389}	—	September 29, 2009	Mount Lemmon	Mount Lemmon Survey	L4	7.5 km	MPC; JPL
589317	2009 SC_{391}	—	November 26, 2010	Mount Lemmon	Mount Lemmon Survey	L4	6.2 km	MPC; JPL
589318	2009 SF_{391}	—	October 13, 2010	Mount Lemmon	Mount Lemmon Survey	L4 · ERY	6.5 km	MPC; JPL
589319	2009 SL_{391}	—	September 20, 2009	Kitt Peak	Spacewatch	L4	5.7 km	MPC; JPL
589320	2009 SX_{391}	—	October 17, 2010	Mount Lemmon	Mount Lemmon Survey	L4	6.5 km	MPC; JPL
589321	2009 SJ_{392}	—	September 26, 2009	Kitt Peak	Spacewatch	L4	6.0 km	MPC; JPL
589322	2009 SO_{392}	—	September 17, 2009	Kitt Peak	Spacewatch	L4	7.3 km	MPC; JPL
589323	2009 SA_{394}	—	September 27, 2009	Kitt Peak	Spacewatch	KOR	1.1 km	MPC; JPL
589324	2009 SV_{396}	—	September 21, 2009	Mount Lemmon	Mount Lemmon Survey	L4	7.3 km	MPC; JPL
589325	2009 ST_{400}	—	September 16, 2009	Mount Lemmon	Mount Lemmon Survey	·	2.6 km	MPC; JPL
589326	2009 SG_{401}	—	September 18, 2009	Kitt Peak	Spacewatch	L4	7.7 km	MPC; JPL
589327	2009 SA_{402}	—	September 21, 2009	Mount Lemmon	Mount Lemmon Survey	L4 · ERY	6.7 km	MPC; JPL
589328	2009 SV_{404}	—	September 21, 2009	Mount Lemmon	Mount Lemmon Survey	L4 · ERY	6.4 km	MPC; JPL
589329	2009 SD_{405}	—	September 26, 2009	Kitt Peak	Spacewatch	L4 · ERY	6.3 km	MPC; JPL
589330	2009 SS_{405}	—	September 21, 2009	Kitt Peak	Spacewatch	L4	6.1 km	MPC; JPL
589331	2009 SY_{405}	—	September 21, 2009	Mount Lemmon	Mount Lemmon Survey	L4 · ERY	6.8 km	MPC; JPL
589332	2009 SP_{408}	—	September 17, 2009	Kitt Peak	Spacewatch	·	920 m	MPC; JPL
589333	2009 SC_{409}	—	September 16, 2009	Kitt Peak	Spacewatch	L4	5.8 km	MPC; JPL
589334	2009 SM_{412}	—	September 29, 2009	Kitt Peak	Spacewatch	L4	6.5 km	MPC; JPL
589335	2009 SN_{412}	—	September 26, 2009	Kitt Peak	Spacewatch	L4	7.0 km	MPC; JPL
589336	2009 SU_{412}	—	September 17, 2009	Mount Lemmon	Mount Lemmon Survey	L4	7.0 km	MPC; JPL
589337	2009 TQ_{19}	—	October 11, 2009	Mount Lemmon	Mount Lemmon Survey	·	1.0 km	MPC; JPL
589338	2009 TD_{50}	—	October 2, 2009	Mount Lemmon	Mount Lemmon Survey	·	1.3 km	MPC; JPL
589339	2009 TJ_{52}	—	September 21, 2017	Haleakala	Pan-STARRS 1	·	1.1 km	MPC; JPL
589340	2009 TX_{52}	—	November 13, 2010	Kitt Peak	Spacewatch	L4	9.0 km	MPC; JPL
589341	2009 TX_{53}	—	June 15, 2016	Mount Lemmon	Mount Lemmon Survey	·	1.4 km	MPC; JPL
589342	2009 TC_{55}	—	October 14, 2009	Mount Lemmon	Mount Lemmon Survey	L4	7.0 km	MPC; JPL
589343	2009 UR_{12}	—	September 17, 2009	Mount Lemmon	Mount Lemmon Survey	·	2.4 km	MPC; JPL
589344	2009 UA_{40}	—	October 25, 2009	Modra	Gajdoš, S., Világi, J.	(194)	1.1 km	MPC; JPL
589345	2009 UP_{48}	—	September 13, 2005	Kitt Peak	Spacewatch	MAS	610 m	MPC; JPL
589346	2009 UY_{48}	—	October 27, 2005	Mount Lemmon	Mount Lemmon Survey	·	1.1 km	MPC; JPL
589347	2009 UE_{49}	—	October 22, 2009	Mount Lemmon	Mount Lemmon Survey	KOR	990 m	MPC; JPL
589348	2009 UR_{53}	—	August 15, 2009	Kitt Peak	Spacewatch	·	3.0 km	MPC; JPL
589349	2009 UN_{62}	—	September 15, 2009	Kitt Peak	Spacewatch	·	820 m	MPC; JPL
589350	2009 UF_{64}	—	October 17, 2009	Mount Lemmon	Mount Lemmon Survey	·	890 m	MPC; JPL
589351	2009 UF_{65}	—	October 17, 2009	Mount Lemmon	Mount Lemmon Survey	·	840 m	MPC; JPL
589352	2009 UO_{77}	—	October 21, 2009	Mount Lemmon	Mount Lemmon Survey	·	1.4 km	MPC; JPL
589353	2009 UM_{79}	—	October 22, 2009	Mount Lemmon	Mount Lemmon Survey	L4	6.1 km	MPC; JPL
589354	2009 US_{79}	—	October 22, 2009	Mount Lemmon	Mount Lemmon Survey	·	940 m	MPC; JPL
589355	2009 UA_{96}	—	October 22, 2009	Mount Lemmon	Mount Lemmon Survey	·	530 m	MPC; JPL
589356	2009 UF_{97}	—	October 23, 2009	Kitt Peak	Spacewatch	HNS	840 m	MPC; JPL
589357	2009 UN_{107}	—	January 21, 2002	Kitt Peak	Spacewatch	·	880 m	MPC; JPL
589358	2009 UZ_{116}	—	October 22, 2009	Mount Lemmon	Mount Lemmon Survey	L4	7.2 km	MPC; JPL
589359	2009 UG_{117}	—	October 22, 2009	Mount Lemmon	Mount Lemmon Survey	·	1.3 km	MPC; JPL
589360 Yulialinde	2009 UT_{126}	Yulialinde	October 20, 2009	Zelenchukskaya Stn	T. V. Krjačko, Satovski, B.	·	2.6 km	MPC; JPL
589361	2009 UB_{143}	—	September 19, 2009	Mount Lemmon	Mount Lemmon Survey	·	1.6 km	MPC; JPL
589362	2009 UM_{143}	—	October 18, 2009	Mount Lemmon	Mount Lemmon Survey	·	880 m	MPC; JPL
589363	2009 UG_{161}	—	October 22, 2009	Catalina	CSS	(5)	900 m	MPC; JPL
589364	2009 UM_{161}	—	March 15, 2012	Mount Lemmon	Mount Lemmon Survey	·	990 m	MPC; JPL
589365	2009 UP_{161}	—	October 18, 2009	Mount Lemmon	Mount Lemmon Survey	·	900 m	MPC; JPL
589366	2009 UD_{162}	—	October 16, 2009	Mount Lemmon	Mount Lemmon Survey	L4	7.2 km	MPC; JPL
589367	2009 UF_{162}	—	November 2, 2010	Mount Lemmon	Mount Lemmon Survey	L4	6.9 km	MPC; JPL
589368	2009 UL_{170}	—	December 2, 2010	Mount Lemmon	Mount Lemmon Survey	·	2.9 km	MPC; JPL
589369	2009 UX_{171}	—	October 27, 2009	Mount Lemmon	Mount Lemmon Survey	L4	7.6 km	MPC; JPL
589370	2009 UB_{174}	—	October 16, 2009	Mount Lemmon	Mount Lemmon Survey	L4 · ERY	6.3 km	MPC; JPL
589371	2009 UE_{174}	—	October 24, 2009	Kitt Peak	Spacewatch	L4	5.8 km	MPC; JPL
589372	2009 UE_{175}	—	October 21, 2009	Mount Lemmon	Mount Lemmon Survey	L4	6.8 km	MPC; JPL
589373	2009 UK_{176}	—	October 22, 2009	Mount Lemmon	Mount Lemmon Survey	·	1.3 km	MPC; JPL
589374	2009 UY_{176}	—	October 22, 2009	Mount Lemmon	Mount Lemmon Survey	L4	9.7 km	MPC; JPL
589375	2009 UP_{184}	—	October 25, 2009	Kitt Peak	Spacewatch	L4	6.5 km	MPC; JPL
589376	2009 VB_{12}	—	October 23, 2009	Mount Lemmon	Mount Lemmon Survey	·	3.9 km	MPC; JPL
589377	2009 VV_{17}	—	October 25, 2005	Mount Lemmon	Mount Lemmon Survey	(5)	900 m	MPC; JPL
589378	2009 VO_{26}	—	September 26, 2009	Kitt Peak	Spacewatch	·	3.0 km	MPC; JPL
589379	2009 VJ_{27}	—	October 27, 2009	Kitt Peak	Spacewatch	·	3.3 km	MPC; JPL
589380	2009 VT_{33}	—	October 28, 2005	Kitt Peak	Spacewatch	·	1.4 km	MPC; JPL
589381	2009 VD_{49}	—	October 25, 2005	Mount Lemmon	Mount Lemmon Survey	·	650 m	MPC; JPL
589382	2009 VT_{62}	—	November 8, 2009	Mount Lemmon	Mount Lemmon Survey	THM	1.6 km	MPC; JPL
589383	2009 VD_{67}	—	November 9, 2009	Mount Lemmon	Mount Lemmon Survey	·	930 m	MPC; JPL
589384	2009 VD_{90}	—	November 10, 2005	Kitt Peak	Spacewatch	·	1.0 km	MPC; JPL
589385	2009 VF_{101}	—	November 10, 2009	Kitt Peak	Spacewatch	·	1.1 km	MPC; JPL
589386	2009 VN_{110}	—	March 26, 2006	Mount Lemmon	Mount Lemmon Survey	·	3.9 km	MPC; JPL
589387	2009 VR_{119}	—	November 10, 2009	Kitt Peak	Spacewatch	EUN	760 m	MPC; JPL
589388	2009 VS_{119}	—	November 10, 2009	Kitt Peak	Spacewatch	·	640 m	MPC; JPL
589389	2009 VS_{120}	—	April 27, 2012	Haleakala	Pan-STARRS 1	·	780 m	MPC; JPL
589390	2009 VS_{122}	—	October 26, 2009	Mount Lemmon	Mount Lemmon Survey	·	1.2 km	MPC; JPL
589391	2009 VD_{124}	—	November 9, 2009	Mount Lemmon	Mount Lemmon Survey	·	3.4 km	MPC; JPL
589392	2009 VL_{125}	—	October 3, 2013	Kitt Peak	Spacewatch	(5)	880 m	MPC; JPL
589393	2009 VO_{126}	—	November 8, 2009	Mount Lemmon	Mount Lemmon Survey	·	2.4 km	MPC; JPL
589394	2009 VW_{126}	—	November 9, 2009	Kitt Peak	Spacewatch	·	1.1 km	MPC; JPL
589395	2009 WJ_{4}	—	October 12, 2004	Kitt Peak	Deep Ecliptic Survey	·	1.0 km	MPC; JPL
589396	2009 WK_{8}	—	November 19, 2009	Tzec Maun	Nevski, V.	·	1.8 km	MPC; JPL
589397	2009 WR_{21}	—	April 26, 2008	Mount Lemmon	Mount Lemmon Survey	·	1.2 km	MPC; JPL
589398	2009 WT_{24}	—	November 8, 2009	Kitt Peak	Spacewatch	·	700 m	MPC; JPL
589399	2009 WV_{24}	—	December 8, 2005	Mount Lemmon	Mount Lemmon Survey	(5)	1.1 km	MPC; JPL
589400	2009 WA_{38}	—	July 1, 2008	Kitt Peak	Spacewatch	·	1.2 km	MPC; JPL

== 589401–589500 ==
back to top

Designation			Discovery			Properties		Ref
Permanent	Provisional	Named after	Date	Site	Discoverer(s)	Category	Diam.	Ref
589401	2009 WB_{44}	—	October 30, 2005	Kitt Peak	Spacewatch	·	750 m	MPC; JPL
589402	2009 WP_{47}	—	September 15, 2009	Kitt Peak	Spacewatch	L4	9.2 km	MPC; JPL
589403	2009 WR_{48}	—	November 26, 2005	Kitt Peak	Spacewatch	(5)	1.0 km	MPC; JPL
589404	2009 WX_{48}	—	October 24, 2009	Kitt Peak	Spacewatch	HNS	940 m	MPC; JPL
589405	2009 WL_{57}	—	October 23, 2009	Kitt Peak	Spacewatch	·	860 m	MPC; JPL
589406	2009 WO_{60}	—	November 16, 2009	Mount Lemmon	Mount Lemmon Survey	·	800 m	MPC; JPL
589407	2009 WD_{67}	—	October 25, 2005	Mount Lemmon	Mount Lemmon Survey	·	770 m	MPC; JPL
589408	2009 WP_{77}	—	November 18, 2009	Kitt Peak	Spacewatch	·	1.6 km	MPC; JPL
589409	2009 WN_{80}	—	November 18, 2009	Kitt Peak	Spacewatch	·	3.3 km	MPC; JPL
589410	2009 WQ_{95}	—	October 24, 2009	Kitt Peak	Spacewatch	·	1.1 km	MPC; JPL
589411	2009 WJ_{100}	—	November 21, 2009	Catalina	CSS	·	1.2 km	MPC; JPL
589412	2009 WX_{116}	—	November 20, 2009	Kitt Peak	Spacewatch	·	1.0 km	MPC; JPL
589413	2009 WW_{118}	—	October 25, 2009	Kitt Peak	Spacewatch	·	1.4 km	MPC; JPL
589414	2009 WM_{125}	—	November 20, 2009	Kitt Peak	Spacewatch	·	1.5 km	MPC; JPL
589415	2009 WZ_{127}	—	April 9, 2003	Kitt Peak	Spacewatch	·	1 km	MPC; JPL
589416	2009 WQ_{139}	—	October 28, 2005	Kitt Peak	Spacewatch	·	1.0 km	MPC; JPL
589417	2009 WX_{139}	—	October 14, 2009	Mount Lemmon	Mount Lemmon Survey	·	3.2 km	MPC; JPL
589418	2009 WK_{140}	—	August 21, 2001	Kitt Peak	Spacewatch	·	850 m	MPC; JPL
589419	2009 WA_{142}	—	September 8, 1996	Kitt Peak	Spacewatch	L4 · (8060)	6.5 km	MPC; JPL
589420	2009 WQ_{149}	—	October 6, 2008	Mount Lemmon	Mount Lemmon Survey	L4	7.4 km	MPC; JPL
589421	2009 WF_{150}	—	October 14, 2009	Mount Lemmon	Mount Lemmon Survey	L4	8.9 km	MPC; JPL
589422	2009 WV_{153}	—	November 19, 2009	Mount Lemmon	Mount Lemmon Survey	·	1.1 km	MPC; JPL
589423	2009 WN_{156}	—	March 23, 2003	Palomar	NEAT	MAR	1.3 km	MPC; JPL
589424	2009 WY_{179}	—	November 23, 2009	Kitt Peak	Spacewatch	·	970 m	MPC; JPL
589425	2009 WC_{189}	—	November 9, 2009	Kitt Peak	Spacewatch	·	1.2 km	MPC; JPL
589426	2009 WG_{189}	—	November 9, 2009	Mount Lemmon	Mount Lemmon Survey	·	1.2 km	MPC; JPL
589427	2009 WM_{191}	—	October 24, 2009	Kitt Peak	Spacewatch	·	1.1 km	MPC; JPL
589428	2009 WB_{194}	—	November 24, 2009	Kitt Peak	Spacewatch	(5)	1.1 km	MPC; JPL
589429	2009 WB_{202}	—	November 17, 2009	Catalina	CSS	·	1.7 km	MPC; JPL
589430	2009 WA_{208}	—	December 1, 2005	Mount Lemmon	Mount Lemmon Survey	·	1.2 km	MPC; JPL
589431	2009 WV_{222}	—	November 16, 2009	Mount Lemmon	Mount Lemmon Survey	·	800 m	MPC; JPL
589432	2009 WQ_{224}	—	November 16, 2009	Mount Lemmon	Mount Lemmon Survey	·	1.1 km	MPC; JPL
589433	2009 WA_{230}	—	November 17, 2009	Mount Lemmon	Mount Lemmon Survey	·	1.3 km	MPC; JPL
589434	2009 WQ_{231}	—	October 12, 2009	Mount Lemmon	Mount Lemmon Survey	L4	8.2 km	MPC; JPL
589435	2009 WU_{231}	—	October 14, 2009	Mount Lemmon	Mount Lemmon Survey	·	830 m	MPC; JPL
589436	2009 WR_{232}	—	December 7, 2005	Kitt Peak	Spacewatch	(5)	1.2 km	MPC; JPL
589437	2009 WS_{233}	—	November 18, 2009	Kitt Peak	Spacewatch	·	1.2 km	MPC; JPL
589438	2009 WV_{237}	—	November 17, 2009	Kitt Peak	Spacewatch	·	970 m	MPC; JPL
589439	2009 WW_{239}	—	January 23, 2006	Kitt Peak	Spacewatch	AGN	1.1 km	MPC; JPL
589440	2009 WH_{243}	—	November 19, 2009	Kitt Peak	Spacewatch	·	1.4 km	MPC; JPL
589441	2009 WS_{248}	—	February 21, 2007	Kitt Peak	Spacewatch	·	1.4 km	MPC; JPL
589442	2009 WH_{253}	—	November 16, 2009	Kitt Peak	Spacewatch	EUN	1.2 km	MPC; JPL
589443	2009 WQ_{253}	—	November 16, 2009	Kitt Peak	Spacewatch	·	1.4 km	MPC; JPL
589444	2009 WD_{255}	—	November 19, 2009	Kitt Peak	Spacewatch	ADE	1.8 km	MPC; JPL
589445	2009 WH_{271}	—	November 23, 2009	Mount Lemmon	Mount Lemmon Survey	MAR	940 m	MPC; JPL
589446	2009 WX_{271}	—	November 24, 2009	Kitt Peak	Spacewatch	·	920 m	MPC; JPL
589447	2009 WB_{272}	—	April 1, 2016	Haleakala	Pan-STARRS 1	·	1.0 km	MPC; JPL
589448	2009 WL_{272}	—	November 3, 2012	Mount Lemmon	Mount Lemmon Survey	·	590 m	MPC; JPL
589449	2009 WU_{272}	—	November 17, 2009	Mount Lemmon	Mount Lemmon Survey	(5)	880 m	MPC; JPL
589450	2009 WF_{273}	—	November 24, 2009	Kitt Peak	Spacewatch	·	1.2 km	MPC; JPL
589451	2009 WX_{274}	—	November 17, 2009	Mount Lemmon	Mount Lemmon Survey	·	860 m	MPC; JPL
589452	2009 WG_{275}	—	November 19, 2009	Kitt Peak	Spacewatch	·	1.3 km	MPC; JPL
589453	2009 WH_{275}	—	October 5, 2013	Haleakala	Pan-STARRS 1	·	830 m	MPC; JPL
589454	2009 WQ_{276}	—	November 4, 2013	Mount Lemmon	Mount Lemmon Survey	MAR	620 m	MPC; JPL
589455	2009 WT_{276}	—	March 17, 2016	Haleakala	Pan-STARRS 1	·	1.0 km	MPC; JPL
589456	2009 WX_{277}	—	October 24, 2013	Mount Lemmon	Mount Lemmon Survey	·	1.1 km	MPC; JPL
589457	2009 WG_{279}	—	October 24, 2013	Mount Lemmon	Mount Lemmon Survey	·	980 m	MPC; JPL
589458	2009 WZ_{280}	—	November 26, 2009	Mount Lemmon	Mount Lemmon Survey	(5)	820 m	MPC; JPL
589459	2009 WL_{284}	—	April 1, 2011	Kitt Peak	Spacewatch	·	940 m	MPC; JPL
589460	2009 WY_{284}	—	November 21, 2009	Kitt Peak	Spacewatch	·	1.4 km	MPC; JPL
589461	2009 WB_{291}	—	November 25, 2009	Kitt Peak	Spacewatch	·	750 m	MPC; JPL
589462	2009 XS_{4}	—	August 7, 2008	Kitt Peak	Spacewatch	·	1.3 km	MPC; JPL
589463	2009 XD_{5}	—	January 23, 2006	Kitt Peak	Spacewatch	·	1.9 km	MPC; JPL
589464	2009 XG_{13}	—	December 11, 2009	Mount Lemmon	Mount Lemmon Survey	·	850 m	MPC; JPL
589465	2009 XN_{26}	—	December 9, 2013	XuYi	PMO NEO Survey Program	·	1.0 km	MPC; JPL
589466	2009 XW_{29}	—	September 23, 2005	Kitt Peak	Spacewatch	MAS	460 m	MPC; JPL
589467	2009 YG_{1}	—	November 8, 2009	Mount Lemmon	Mount Lemmon Survey	EOS	2.2 km	MPC; JPL
589468	2009 YA_{5}	—	August 21, 2004	Siding Spring	SSS	BRG	1.5 km	MPC; JPL
589469	2009 YV_{5}	—	December 17, 2009	Mount Lemmon	Mount Lemmon Survey	·	1.3 km	MPC; JPL
589470	2009 YE_{13}	—	December 18, 2009	Mount Lemmon	Mount Lemmon Survey	·	1.1 km	MPC; JPL
589471	2009 YF_{27}	—	March 22, 2015	Mount Lemmon	Mount Lemmon Survey	·	1.2 km	MPC; JPL
589472	2009 YN_{27}	—	October 13, 2013	Kitt Peak	Spacewatch	·	1.1 km	MPC; JPL
589473	2010 AP_{9}	—	December 17, 2009	Kitt Peak	Spacewatch	EUN	1.2 km	MPC; JPL
589474	2010 AW_{9}	—	January 6, 2010	Kitt Peak	Spacewatch	·	1.7 km	MPC; JPL
589475	2010 AP_{13}	—	November 7, 2005	Mauna Kea	A. Boattini	·	1.2 km	MPC; JPL
589476	2010 AZ_{13}	—	September 25, 2008	Mount Lemmon	Mount Lemmon Survey	·	1.2 km	MPC; JPL
589477	2010 AL_{14}	—	April 25, 2004	Kitt Peak	Spacewatch	·	520 m	MPC; JPL
589478	2010 AU_{16}	—	January 7, 2010	Mount Lemmon	Mount Lemmon Survey	WIT	1 km	MPC; JPL
589479	2010 AK_{22}	—	January 6, 2010	Kitt Peak	Spacewatch	·	1.5 km	MPC; JPL
589480	2010 AM_{22}	—	January 6, 2010	Kitt Peak	Spacewatch	·	940 m	MPC; JPL
589481	2010 AR_{22}	—	September 5, 2008	Kitt Peak	Spacewatch	·	1.4 km	MPC; JPL
589482	2010 AQ_{28}	—	January 8, 2010	Mount Lemmon	Mount Lemmon Survey	·	1.1 km	MPC; JPL
589483	2010 AD_{36}	—	January 26, 2006	Kitt Peak	Spacewatch	·	1.5 km	MPC; JPL
589484	2010 AV_{36}	—	January 7, 2010	Kitt Peak	Spacewatch	·	1.3 km	MPC; JPL
589485	2010 AU_{37}	—	January 7, 2010	Kitt Peak	Spacewatch	·	1.4 km	MPC; JPL
589486	2010 AX_{44}	—	January 7, 2010	Mount Lemmon	Mount Lemmon Survey	(5)	1.1 km	MPC; JPL
589487	2010 AW_{46}	—	December 18, 2009	Mount Lemmon	Mount Lemmon Survey	·	2.7 km	MPC; JPL
589488	2010 AY_{49}	—	February 2, 2006	Kitt Peak	Spacewatch	·	1.1 km	MPC; JPL
589489	2010 AS_{53}	—	February 7, 2006	Mount Lemmon	Mount Lemmon Survey	·	1.5 km	MPC; JPL
589490	2010 AD_{61}	—	November 18, 2009	Mount Lemmon	Mount Lemmon Survey	·	2.0 km	MPC; JPL
589491	2010 AK_{69}	—	January 23, 2006	Kitt Peak	Spacewatch	(5)	1.1 km	MPC; JPL
589492	2010 AD_{70}	—	January 12, 2010	Mount Lemmon	Mount Lemmon Survey	HNS	1.2 km	MPC; JPL
589493	2010 AG_{76}	—	October 24, 2005	Mauna Kea	A. Boattini	EUN	1.2 km	MPC; JPL
589494	2010 AE_{143}	—	March 5, 2006	Kitt Peak	Spacewatch	·	1.8 km	MPC; JPL
589495	2010 AL_{143}	—	November 16, 2009	Mount Lemmon	Mount Lemmon Survey	·	1.2 km	MPC; JPL
589496	2010 AM_{154}	—	April 30, 2011	Haleakala	Pan-STARRS 1	·	1.7 km	MPC; JPL
589497	2010 AY_{159}	—	February 19, 2015	Haleakala	Pan-STARRS 1	·	1.1 km	MPC; JPL
589498	2010 BE_{5}	—	January 5, 2010	Kitt Peak	Spacewatch	·	1.4 km	MPC; JPL
589499	2010 BZ_{133}	—	November 8, 2010	Mount Lemmon	Mount Lemmon Survey	L4	9.5 km	MPC; JPL
589500	2010 BA_{145}	—	April 15, 2016	Haleakala	Pan-STARRS 1	L4	6.9 km	MPC; JPL

== 589501–589600 ==
back to top

Designation			Discovery			Properties		Ref
Permanent	Provisional	Named after	Date	Site	Discoverer(s)	Category	Diam.	Ref
589501	2010 CN_{3}	—	October 24, 2005	Mauna Kea	A. Boattini	·	1.6 km	MPC; JPL
589502	2010 CX_{21}	—	February 9, 2010	Kitt Peak	Spacewatch	·	560 m	MPC; JPL
589503	2010 CQ_{22}	—	February 9, 2010	Kitt Peak	Spacewatch	·	1.7 km	MPC; JPL
589504	2010 CM_{25}	—	October 11, 2004	Palomar	NEAT	EUN	1.1 km	MPC; JPL
589505	2010 CJ_{26}	—	September 11, 2007	Mount Lemmon	Mount Lemmon Survey	·	1.8 km	MPC; JPL
589506	2010 CL_{26}	—	March 9, 2002	Kitt Peak	Spacewatch	·	990 m	MPC; JPL
589507	2010 CT_{26}	—	January 11, 2010	Kitt Peak	Spacewatch	·	1.8 km	MPC; JPL
589508	2010 CU_{27}	—	October 9, 2008	Kitt Peak	Spacewatch	·	1.8 km	MPC; JPL
589509	2010 CV_{31}	—	October 12, 2004	Moletai	K. Černis, Zdanavicius, J.	·	1.7 km	MPC; JPL
589510	2010 CC_{64}	—	February 9, 2010	Mount Lemmon	Mount Lemmon Survey	·	1.3 km	MPC; JPL
589511	2010 CJ_{66}	—	February 6, 2010	Mount Lemmon	Mount Lemmon Survey	·	1.7 km	MPC; JPL
589512	2010 CV_{66}	—	February 10, 2010	Kitt Peak	Spacewatch	·	2.4 km	MPC; JPL
589513	2010 CK_{67}	—	January 19, 2005	Kitt Peak	Spacewatch	MRX	1.0 km	MPC; JPL
589514	2010 CO_{69}	—	October 24, 2005	Mauna Kea	A. Boattini	·	1.7 km	MPC; JPL
589515	2010 CH_{74}	—	October 29, 2003	Kitt Peak	Deep Lens Survey	·	1.4 km	MPC; JPL
589516	2010 CF_{85}	—	February 14, 2010	Kitt Peak	Spacewatch	·	1.8 km	MPC; JPL
589517	2010 CL_{86}	—	February 23, 2007	Kitt Peak	Spacewatch	·	580 m	MPC; JPL
589518	2010 CM_{86}	—	February 14, 2010	Mount Lemmon	Mount Lemmon Survey	·	1.3 km	MPC; JPL
589519	2010 CD_{88}	—	February 14, 2010	Mount Lemmon	Mount Lemmon Survey	·	1.6 km	MPC; JPL
589520	2010 CB_{92}	—	February 14, 2010	Mount Lemmon	Mount Lemmon Survey	·	1.3 km	MPC; JPL
589521	2010 CZ_{93}	—	October 31, 2005	Mauna Kea	A. Boattini	·	1.8 km	MPC; JPL
589522	2010 CJ_{99}	—	February 14, 2010	Kitt Peak	Spacewatch	·	520 m	MPC; JPL
589523	2010 CR_{102}	—	February 14, 2010	Mount Lemmon	Mount Lemmon Survey	·	1.6 km	MPC; JPL
589524	2010 CU_{102}	—	September 29, 2008	Kitt Peak	Spacewatch	·	1.4 km	MPC; JPL
589525	2010 CM_{103}	—	February 14, 2010	Kitt Peak	Spacewatch	MRX	880 m	MPC; JPL
589526	2010 CF_{105}	—	February 14, 2010	Mount Lemmon	Mount Lemmon Survey	H	290 m	MPC; JPL
589527	2010 CD_{106}	—	February 14, 2010	Mount Lemmon	Mount Lemmon Survey	·	1.3 km	MPC; JPL
589528	2010 CM_{113}	—	February 14, 2010	Mount Lemmon	Mount Lemmon Survey	·	1.5 km	MPC; JPL
589529	2010 CP_{120}	—	September 6, 2008	Catalina	CSS	·	1.3 km	MPC; JPL
589530	2010 CJ_{123}	—	January 11, 2010	Kitt Peak	Spacewatch	EUN	1.6 km	MPC; JPL
589531	2010 CR_{129}	—	January 11, 2010	Kitt Peak	Spacewatch	·	1.1 km	MPC; JPL
589532	2010 CE_{158}	—	January 12, 2010	Mount Lemmon	Mount Lemmon Survey	·	1.9 km	MPC; JPL
589533	2010 CJ_{160}	—	February 9, 2010	Catalina	CSS	·	2.0 km	MPC; JPL
589534	2010 CW_{162}	—	January 30, 2006	Kitt Peak	Spacewatch	·	1.1 km	MPC; JPL
589535	2010 CZ_{164}	—	February 10, 2010	Kitt Peak	Spacewatch	·	1.7 km	MPC; JPL
589536	2010 CC_{175}	—	November 2, 2008	Mount Lemmon	Mount Lemmon Survey	·	1.8 km	MPC; JPL
589537	2010 CT_{259}	—	January 30, 2003	Kitt Peak	Spacewatch	·	2.5 km	MPC; JPL
589538	2010 CD_{264}	—	September 14, 2013	Mount Lemmon	Mount Lemmon Survey	·	890 m	MPC; JPL
589539	2010 CH_{270}	—	January 12, 2010	Kitt Peak	Spacewatch	·	1.6 km	MPC; JPL
589540	2010 CY_{270}	—	February 23, 2015	Haleakala	Pan-STARRS 1	·	1.5 km	MPC; JPL
589541	2010 CB_{271}	—	December 24, 2013	Mount Lemmon	Mount Lemmon Survey	·	1.2 km	MPC; JPL
589542	2010 CG_{272}	—	September 24, 2017	Haleakala	Pan-STARRS 1	·	1.5 km	MPC; JPL
589543	2010 CO_{273}	—	February 27, 2015	Haleakala	Pan-STARRS 1	AGN	950 m	MPC; JPL
589544	2010 CS_{274}	—	February 14, 2010	Kitt Peak	Spacewatch	·	550 m	MPC; JPL
589545	2010 DG_{4}	—	January 23, 2006	Kitt Peak	Spacewatch	·	1.6 km	MPC; JPL
589546	2010 DN_{4}	—	February 16, 2010	Mount Lemmon	Mount Lemmon Survey	·	1.0 km	MPC; JPL
589547	2010 DB_{5}	—	February 16, 2010	Mount Lemmon	Mount Lemmon Survey	·	1.5 km	MPC; JPL
589548	2010 DG_{10}	—	October 7, 2008	Kitt Peak	Spacewatch	WIT	710 m	MPC; JPL
589549	2010 DU_{10}	—	November 19, 2008	Mount Lemmon	Mount Lemmon Survey	·	1.2 km	MPC; JPL
589550	2010 DM_{42}	—	February 17, 2010	Kitt Peak	Spacewatch	MRX	870 m	MPC; JPL
589551	2010 DU_{92}	—	September 9, 2007	Kitt Peak	Spacewatch	·	1.3 km	MPC; JPL
589552	2010 DM_{107}	—	February 13, 2010	Mount Lemmon	Mount Lemmon Survey	HNS	1.0 km	MPC; JPL
589553	2010 DK_{109}	—	February 17, 2010	Kitt Peak	Spacewatch	·	1.2 km	MPC; JPL
589554	2010 DM_{111}	—	May 13, 2015	Mount Lemmon	Mount Lemmon Survey	·	1.3 km	MPC; JPL
589555	2010 DA_{112}	—	February 17, 2010	Kitt Peak	Spacewatch	·	560 m	MPC; JPL
589556	2010 DO_{112}	—	February 16, 2010	Mount Lemmon	Mount Lemmon Survey	AGN	980 m	MPC; JPL
589557	2010 ET_{2}	—	March 5, 2010	Catalina	CSS	·	680 m	MPC; JPL
589558 Nishikawa	2010 EN_{35}	Nishikawa	March 10, 2010	Moletai	K. Černis, Zdanavicius, J.	·	600 m	MPC; JPL
589559	2010 EX_{35}	—	July 28, 2003	Palomar	NEAT	H	560 m	MPC; JPL
589560	2010 EO_{43}	—	February 16, 2010	Mount Lemmon	Mount Lemmon Survey	·	530 m	MPC; JPL
589561	2010 EA_{69}	—	May 26, 2006	Kitt Peak	Spacewatch	·	1.9 km	MPC; JPL
589562	2010 EM_{70}	—	March 12, 2010	Kitt Peak	Spacewatch	JUN	940 m	MPC; JPL
589563	2010 EB_{95}	—	March 10, 2005	Mount Lemmon	Mount Lemmon Survey	·	2.0 km	MPC; JPL
589564	2010 EW_{96}	—	February 14, 2010	Kitt Peak	Spacewatch	·	520 m	MPC; JPL
589565	2010 ER_{97}	—	February 19, 2010	Mount Lemmon	Mount Lemmon Survey	·	630 m	MPC; JPL
589566	2010 EU_{100}	—	February 18, 2010	Mount Lemmon	Mount Lemmon Survey	·	1.3 km	MPC; JPL
589567	2010 EZ_{103}	—	March 24, 2001	Kitt Peak	M. W. Buie, Kern, S.	NEM	2.0 km	MPC; JPL
589568	2010 EB_{105}	—	January 7, 2006	Kitt Peak	Spacewatch	·	1.6 km	MPC; JPL
589569	2010 EE_{127}	—	January 16, 2003	Palomar	NEAT	·	660 m	MPC; JPL
589570	2010 EJ_{132}	—	December 31, 2000	Haleakala	NEAT	·	1.6 km	MPC; JPL
589571	2010 EG_{141}	—	March 12, 2010	Mount Lemmon	Mount Lemmon Survey	·	500 m	MPC; JPL
589572	2010 EJ_{141}	—	March 12, 2010	Kitt Peak	Spacewatch	·	1.8 km	MPC; JPL
589573	2010 EM_{171}	—	March 5, 2010	Palomar	Palomar Transient Factory	·	1.8 km	MPC; JPL
589574	2010 EA_{180}	—	November 20, 2009	Kitt Peak	Spacewatch	·	1.5 km	MPC; JPL
589575	2010 EZ_{185}	—	April 18, 2015	Cerro Tololo	DECam	EUN	960 m	MPC; JPL
589576	2010 ED_{188}	—	May 25, 2015	Haleakala	Pan-STARRS 1	·	1.7 km	MPC; JPL
589577	2010 EQ_{189}	—	February 19, 2010	Mount Lemmon	Mount Lemmon Survey	·	1.2 km	MPC; JPL
589578	2010 FC_{3}	—	April 25, 2006	Kitt Peak	Spacewatch	·	2.0 km	MPC; JPL
589579	2010 FT_{3}	—	April 24, 2007	Kitt Peak	Spacewatch	·	620 m	MPC; JPL
589580	2010 FN_{4}	—	September 18, 2003	Kitt Peak	Spacewatch	·	1.3 km	MPC; JPL
589581	2010 FX_{12}	—	March 16, 2010	Kitt Peak	Spacewatch	MRX	1.2 km	MPC; JPL
589582	2010 FU_{14}	—	March 17, 2010	Kitt Peak	Spacewatch	·	490 m	MPC; JPL
589583	2010 FK_{15}	—	March 18, 2010	Kitt Peak	Spacewatch	·	580 m	MPC; JPL
589584	2010 FB_{18}	—	March 18, 2010	Mount Lemmon	Mount Lemmon Survey	·	1.5 km	MPC; JPL
589585	2010 FB_{19}	—	March 18, 2010	Mount Lemmon	Mount Lemmon Survey	·	530 m	MPC; JPL
589586	2010 FF_{21}	—	November 22, 2003	Kitt Peak	Deep Ecliptic Survey	AGN	920 m	MPC; JPL
589587	2010 FU_{24}	—	March 18, 2010	Mount Lemmon	Mount Lemmon Survey	·	1.6 km	MPC; JPL
589588	2010 FZ_{88}	—	March 13, 2010	Mount Lemmon	Mount Lemmon Survey	·	530 m	MPC; JPL
589589	2010 FZ_{94}	—	March 21, 2010	Kitt Peak	Spacewatch	·	670 m	MPC; JPL
589590	2010 FL_{95}	—	March 25, 2010	Kitt Peak	Spacewatch	·	600 m	MPC; JPL
589591	2010 FB_{137}	—	January 24, 2015	Kitt Peak	Spacewatch	DOR	1.8 km	MPC; JPL
589592	2010 FG_{138}	—	August 1, 2016	Haleakala	Pan-STARRS 1	·	1.2 km	MPC; JPL
589593	2010 FY_{142}	—	March 18, 2010	Mount Lemmon	Mount Lemmon Survey	·	530 m	MPC; JPL
589594	2010 GT_{26}	—	December 2, 2005	Kitt Peak	Spacewatch	·	590 m	MPC; JPL
589595	2010 GL_{35}	—	November 18, 2003	Kitt Peak	Spacewatch	AGN	1.3 km	MPC; JPL
589596	2010 GS_{99}	—	December 7, 2005	Kitt Peak	Spacewatch	·	560 m	MPC; JPL
589597	2010 GU_{109}	—	March 18, 2010	Kitt Peak	Spacewatch	MRX	970 m	MPC; JPL
589598	2010 GZ_{109}	—	April 9, 2010	Kitt Peak	Spacewatch	·	1.9 km	MPC; JPL
589599	2010 GB_{112}	—	April 9, 2010	Mount Lemmon	Mount Lemmon Survey	DOR	1.9 km	MPC; JPL
589600	2010 GS_{115}	—	October 22, 2003	Kitt Peak	Spacewatch	·	2.1 km	MPC; JPL

== 589601–589700 ==
back to top

Designation			Discovery			Properties		Ref
Permanent	Provisional	Named after	Date	Site	Discoverer(s)	Category	Diam.	Ref
589601	2010 GS_{116}	—	September 21, 2003	Palomar	NEAT	·	1.9 km	MPC; JPL
589602	2010 GL_{120}	—	April 11, 2010	Kitt Peak	Spacewatch	·	640 m	MPC; JPL
589603	2010 GV_{122}	—	April 13, 2010	Mount Lemmon	Mount Lemmon Survey	·	540 m	MPC; JPL
589604	2010 GR_{123}	—	March 11, 2005	Catalina	CSS	·	2.9 km	MPC; JPL
589605	2010 GK_{125}	—	April 8, 2010	Kitt Peak	Spacewatch	·	600 m	MPC; JPL
589606	2010 GW_{129}	—	April 7, 2010	Kitt Peak	Spacewatch	·	2.0 km	MPC; JPL
589607	2010 GH_{133}	—	December 21, 2008	Kitt Peak	Spacewatch	KOR	1.3 km	MPC; JPL
589608	2010 GY_{137}	—	March 19, 2010	Kitt Peak	Spacewatch	·	1.3 km	MPC; JPL
589609	2010 GS_{140}	—	March 20, 2010	Kitt Peak	Spacewatch	·	580 m	MPC; JPL
589610	2010 GG_{143}	—	April 10, 2010	Mount Lemmon	Mount Lemmon Survey	·	600 m	MPC; JPL
589611	2010 GB_{173}	—	May 13, 2010	Mount Lemmon	Mount Lemmon Survey	·	2.5 km	MPC; JPL
589612	2010 GE_{177}	—	December 18, 2009	Mount Lemmon	Mount Lemmon Survey	·	1.4 km	MPC; JPL
589613	2010 GY_{178}	—	November 27, 2013	Haleakala	Pan-STARRS 1	·	1.1 km	MPC; JPL
589614	2010 GS_{198}	—	September 19, 2012	Mount Lemmon	Mount Lemmon Survey	·	1.5 km	MPC; JPL
589615	2010 GY_{198}	—	April 4, 2010	Kitt Peak	Spacewatch	·	1.5 km	MPC; JPL
589616	2010 GZ_{198}	—	April 30, 2015	Mount Lemmon	Mount Lemmon Survey	·	2.3 km	MPC; JPL
589617	2010 GH_{201}	—	April 15, 2010	Mount Lemmon	Mount Lemmon Survey	·	1.9 km	MPC; JPL
589618	2010 GZ_{202}	—	November 15, 2014	Mount Lemmon	Mount Lemmon Survey	3:2	4.9 km	MPC; JPL
589619	2010 GU_{207}	—	April 9, 2010	Mount Lemmon	Mount Lemmon Survey	·	1.3 km	MPC; JPL
589620	2010 HL_{132}	—	September 10, 2016	Mount Lemmon	Mount Lemmon Survey	·	2.5 km	MPC; JPL
589621	2010 HY_{139}	—	April 20, 2010	Mount Lemmon	Mount Lemmon Survey	(2076)	610 m	MPC; JPL
589622	2010 HA_{140}	—	April 20, 2010	Mount Lemmon	Mount Lemmon Survey	·	1.4 km	MPC; JPL
589623	2010 JO_{30}	—	August 11, 2001	Palomar	NEAT	·	2.4 km	MPC; JPL
589624	2010 JL_{32}	—	May 6, 2010	Mount Lemmon	Mount Lemmon Survey	NAE	1.8 km	MPC; JPL
589625	2010 JF_{40}	—	September 13, 2007	Mount Lemmon	Mount Lemmon Survey	·	800 m	MPC; JPL
589626	2010 JW_{45}	—	May 7, 2010	Kitt Peak	Spacewatch	·	1.5 km	MPC; JPL
589627	2010 JT_{75}	—	April 11, 2003	Kitt Peak	Spacewatch	·	580 m	MPC; JPL
589628	2010 JM_{76}	—	April 10, 2010	Mount Lemmon	Mount Lemmon Survey	·	1.8 km	MPC; JPL
589629	2010 JT_{85}	—	February 17, 2010	Kitt Peak	Spacewatch	GAL	1.8 km	MPC; JPL
589630	2010 JW_{111}	—	April 11, 1996	Kitt Peak	Spacewatch	·	510 m	MPC; JPL
589631	2010 JA_{123}	—	September 13, 2007	Mount Lemmon	Mount Lemmon Survey	·	1.7 km	MPC; JPL
589632	2010 JM_{149}	—	May 6, 2010	Mount Lemmon	Mount Lemmon Survey	BRA	1.5 km	MPC; JPL
589633	2010 JV_{156}	—	March 14, 2005	Mount Lemmon	Mount Lemmon Survey	DOR	1.7 km	MPC; JPL
589634	2010 JL_{159}	—	September 5, 2007	Siding Spring	K. Sárneczky, L. Kiss	·	1.9 km	MPC; JPL
589635	2010 JO_{164}	—	January 25, 2009	Kitt Peak	Spacewatch	KOR	1.4 km	MPC; JPL
589636	2010 JC_{168}	—	October 23, 2004	Kitt Peak	Spacewatch	·	740 m	MPC; JPL
589637	2010 JV_{168}	—	April 9, 2010	Kitt Peak	Spacewatch	·	2.3 km	MPC; JPL
589638	2010 JJ_{171}	—	February 2, 2009	Kitt Peak	Spacewatch	·	1.7 km	MPC; JPL
589639	2010 JF_{174}	—	May 10, 2010	Mount Lemmon	Mount Lemmon Survey	H	430 m	MPC; JPL
589640	2010 JK_{202}	—	April 18, 2009	Kitt Peak	Spacewatch	·	2.4 km	MPC; JPL
589641	2010 JP_{210}	—	January 26, 2014	Haleakala	Pan-STARRS 1	·	1.7 km	MPC; JPL
589642	2010 JC_{211}	—	May 9, 2010	Siding Spring	SSS	·	720 m	MPC; JPL
589643	2010 KW_{138}	—	November 17, 2011	Mount Lemmon	Mount Lemmon Survey	·	1.9 km	MPC; JPL
589644	2010 KB_{148}	—	December 7, 2013	Nogales	M. Schwartz, P. R. Holvorcem	·	1.3 km	MPC; JPL
589645	2010 KU_{150}	—	April 25, 2014	Kitt Peak	Spacewatch	EOS	1.7 km	MPC; JPL
589646	2010 KS_{151}	—	October 13, 2016	Haleakala	Pan-STARRS 1	·	1.7 km	MPC; JPL
589647	2010 KB_{154}	—	May 4, 2014	Haleakala	Pan-STARRS 1	·	2.4 km	MPC; JPL
589648	2010 KW_{156}	—	August 5, 2013	ESA OGS	ESA OGS	H	450 m	MPC; JPL
589649	2010 LA	—	May 10, 2002	Palomar	NEAT	H	560 m	MPC; JPL
589650	2010 LE_{34}	—	June 6, 2010	Kitt Peak	Spacewatch	·	2.4 km	MPC; JPL
589651	2010 LU_{65}	—	June 11, 2010	Kitt Peak	Spacewatch	·	2.1 km	MPC; JPL
589652	2010 LF_{135}	—	May 17, 2010	Catalina	CSS	PHO	870 m	MPC; JPL
589653	2010 LH_{136}	—	October 27, 2005	Mount Lemmon	Mount Lemmon Survey	EOS	1.5 km	MPC; JPL
589654	2010 LN_{155}	—	February 8, 2013	Haleakala	Pan-STARRS 1	·	2.6 km	MPC; JPL
589655	2010 MS_{4}	—	January 13, 2008	Kitt Peak	Spacewatch	·	1.7 km	MPC; JPL
589656	2010 MM_{119}	—	October 29, 2005	Mount Lemmon	Mount Lemmon Survey	·	2.6 km	MPC; JPL
589657	2010 MD_{141}	—	May 25, 2014	Haleakala	Pan-STARRS 1	·	3.6 km	MPC; JPL
589658	2010 MP_{148}	—	October 23, 2013	Haleakala	Pan-STARRS 1	H	510 m	MPC; JPL
589659	2010 MW_{149}	—	June 20, 2010	Mount Lemmon	Mount Lemmon Survey	·	2.6 km	MPC; JPL
589660	2010 NZ_{45}	—	July 9, 2010	WISE	WISE	·	2.8 km	MPC; JPL
589661	2010 NG_{73}	—	March 12, 2005	Kitt Peak	Deep Ecliptic Survey	HOF	3.2 km	MPC; JPL
589662	2010 NH_{123}	—	November 25, 2011	Haleakala	Pan-STARRS 1	·	2.4 km	MPC; JPL
589663	2010 NC_{133}	—	January 27, 2007	Kitt Peak	Spacewatch	·	2.7 km	MPC; JPL
589664	2010 NU_{139}	—	October 9, 2016	Haleakala	Pan-STARRS 1	·	3.5 km	MPC; JPL
589665	2010 OU_{8}	—	July 16, 2010	WISE	WISE	·	2.8 km	MPC; JPL
589666	2010 OG_{128}	—	March 2, 2008	Kitt Peak	Spacewatch	·	2.6 km	MPC; JPL
589667	2010 OC_{135}	—	August 23, 2007	Kitt Peak	Spacewatch	·	490 m	MPC; JPL
589668	2010 PQ	—	July 6, 2010	Mount Lemmon	Mount Lemmon Survey	·	720 m	MPC; JPL
589669	2010 PC_{62}	—	August 10, 2010	Kitt Peak	Spacewatch	·	830 m	MPC; JPL
589670	2010 PB_{81}	—	October 8, 2010	Catalina	CSS	·	2.9 km	MPC; JPL
589671	2010 PC_{85}	—	March 5, 2014	Haleakala	Pan-STARRS 1	HOF	2.5 km	MPC; JPL
589672	2010 PH_{88}	—	April 18, 2013	Haleakala	Pan-STARRS 1	·	710 m	MPC; JPL
589673	2010 RU	—	September 1, 2010	Mount Lemmon	Mount Lemmon Survey	EOS	1.4 km	MPC; JPL
589674	2010 RF_{3}	—	April 1, 2003	Apache Point	SDSS Collaboration	·	3.2 km	MPC; JPL
589675	2010 RP_{4}	—	September 2, 2010	Mount Lemmon	Mount Lemmon Survey	·	1.8 km	MPC; JPL
589676	2010 RT_{6}	—	September 2, 2010	Mount Lemmon	Mount Lemmon Survey	·	1.7 km	MPC; JPL
589677	2010 RJ_{11}	—	September 2, 2010	Mount Lemmon	Mount Lemmon Survey	(8737)	2.1 km	MPC; JPL
589678	2010 RX_{24}	—	September 3, 2010	Mount Lemmon	Mount Lemmon Survey	·	870 m	MPC; JPL
589679	2010 RZ_{25}	—	March 9, 2008	Mount Lemmon	Mount Lemmon Survey	·	2.9 km	MPC; JPL
589680	2010 RO_{34}	—	October 11, 2007	Mount Lemmon	Mount Lemmon Survey	·	1.1 km	MPC; JPL
589681	2010 RY_{35}	—	September 2, 2010	Kitt Peak	Spacewatch	VER	2.0 km	MPC; JPL
589682	2010 RA_{38}	—	March 20, 2002	Kitt Peak	Deep Ecliptic Survey	·	3.2 km	MPC; JPL
589683	2010 RF_{43}	—	September 6, 2010	La Silla	La Silla	SDO	656 km	MPC; JPL
589684	2010 RL_{53}	—	March 11, 2003	Kitt Peak	Spacewatch	THM	2.1 km	MPC; JPL
589685	2010 RL_{54}	—	March 5, 2008	Kitt Peak	Spacewatch	·	2.4 km	MPC; JPL
589686	2010 RA_{83}	—	September 11, 2010	Mount Lemmon	Mount Lemmon Survey	·	3.2 km	MPC; JPL
589687	2010 RG_{83}	—	March 31, 2008	Mount Lemmon	Mount Lemmon Survey	·	2.2 km	MPC; JPL
589688	2010 RH_{83}	—	February 13, 2008	Kitt Peak	Spacewatch	TRE	2.3 km	MPC; JPL
589689	2010 RG_{85}	—	February 28, 2008	Kitt Peak	Spacewatch	·	2.6 km	MPC; JPL
589690	2010 RO_{87}	—	January 27, 2007	Kitt Peak	Spacewatch	EOS	1.8 km	MPC; JPL
589691	2010 RO_{88}	—	September 4, 2010	Mount Lemmon	Mount Lemmon Survey	·	1.9 km	MPC; JPL
589692	2010 RR_{88}	—	January 28, 2007	Mount Lemmon	Mount Lemmon Survey	·	2.6 km	MPC; JPL
589693	2010 RG_{92}	—	September 10, 2010	Mount Lemmon	Mount Lemmon Survey	EOS	2.0 km	MPC; JPL
589694	2010 RT_{94}	—	September 12, 2010	Mount Lemmon	Mount Lemmon Survey	EOS	1.8 km	MPC; JPL
589695	2010 RM_{96}	—	September 2, 2010	Mount Lemmon	Mount Lemmon Survey	·	2.3 km	MPC; JPL
589696	2010 RT_{96}	—	September 9, 2010	Kitt Peak	Spacewatch	·	1.4 km	MPC; JPL
589697	2010 RW_{98}	—	September 10, 2010	Kitt Peak	Spacewatch	·	1.8 km	MPC; JPL
589698	2010 RR_{103}	—	September 10, 2010	Kitt Peak	Spacewatch	·	2.3 km	MPC; JPL
589699	2010 RR_{107}	—	September 10, 2010	Kitt Peak	Spacewatch	·	780 m	MPC; JPL
589700	2010 RB_{111}	—	September 11, 2010	Kitt Peak	Spacewatch	·	2.3 km	MPC; JPL

== 589701–589800 ==
back to top

Designation			Discovery			Properties		Ref
Permanent	Provisional	Named after	Date	Site	Discoverer(s)	Category	Diam.	Ref
589701	2010 RE_{113}	—	September 11, 2010	Kitt Peak	Spacewatch	·	2.2 km	MPC; JPL
589702	2010 RD_{119}	—	March 26, 2008	Mount Lemmon	Mount Lemmon Survey	EOS	1.6 km	MPC; JPL
589703	2010 RB_{121}	—	August 13, 2010	Kitt Peak	Spacewatch	·	550 m	MPC; JPL
589704	2010 RM_{123}	—	October 9, 2005	Kitt Peak	Spacewatch	·	2.9 km	MPC; JPL
589705	2010 RD_{133}	—	September 15, 2010	Mount Lemmon	Mount Lemmon Survey	·	920 m	MPC; JPL
589706	2010 RF_{135}	—	November 4, 1999	Kitt Peak	Spacewatch	·	2.6 km	MPC; JPL
589707	2010 RN_{135}	—	September 10, 2010	Mount Lemmon	Mount Lemmon Survey	·	2.5 km	MPC; JPL
589708	2010 RV_{137}	—	November 12, 2006	Mount Lemmon	Mount Lemmon Survey	·	2.6 km	MPC; JPL
589709	2010 RM_{138}	—	October 3, 2003	Kitt Peak	Spacewatch	·	1.0 km	MPC; JPL
589710	2010 RW_{146}	—	September 14, 2010	Kitt Peak	Spacewatch	·	690 m	MPC; JPL
589711	2010 RD_{149}	—	April 3, 2008	Mount Lemmon	Mount Lemmon Survey	·	2.4 km	MPC; JPL
589712	2010 RN_{163}	—	February 8, 2008	Kitt Peak	Spacewatch	·	3.0 km	MPC; JPL
589713	2010 RT_{167}	—	September 1, 2010	Mount Lemmon	Mount Lemmon Survey	·	2.1 km	MPC; JPL
589714	2010 RU_{168}	—	September 2, 2010	Mount Lemmon	Mount Lemmon Survey	·	1.8 km	MPC; JPL
589715	2010 RL_{172}	—	September 5, 2010	Mount Lemmon	Mount Lemmon Survey	·	700 m	MPC; JPL
589716	2010 RG_{173}	—	September 5, 2010	Mount Lemmon	Mount Lemmon Survey	·	2.3 km	MPC; JPL
589717	2010 RV_{173}	—	September 6, 2010	Kitt Peak	Spacewatch	EOS	1.5 km	MPC; JPL
589718 Csopak	2010 RY_{173}	Csopak	September 6, 2010	Piszkéstető	K. Sárneczky, Z. Kuli	·	2.1 km	MPC; JPL
589719	2010 RL_{174}	—	September 8, 2010	Kitt Peak	Spacewatch	·	2.9 km	MPC; JPL
589720	2010 RV_{176}	—	November 9, 2007	Kitt Peak	Spacewatch	·	1.2 km	MPC; JPL
589721	2010 RY_{179}	—	September 2, 2010	Mount Lemmon	Mount Lemmon Survey	·	2.2 km	MPC; JPL
589722	2010 RW_{182}	—	August 22, 2004	Kitt Peak	Spacewatch	·	3.3 km	MPC; JPL
589723	2010 RH_{183}	—	October 17, 2010	Catalina	CSS	·	1.0 km	MPC; JPL
589724	2010 RL_{184}	—	October 14, 2010	Mount Lemmon	Mount Lemmon Survey	·	3.1 km	MPC; JPL
589725	2010 RY_{188}	—	November 5, 2007	Kitt Peak	Spacewatch	V	780 m	MPC; JPL
589726	2010 RK_{191}	—	October 23, 2011	Haleakala	Pan-STARRS 1	·	2.1 km	MPC; JPL
589727	2010 RV_{191}	—	April 16, 2013	Haleakala	Pan-STARRS 1	·	920 m	MPC; JPL
589728	2010 RH_{193}	—	July 19, 2015	Haleakala	Pan-STARRS 1	·	3.2 km	MPC; JPL
589729	2010 RL_{194}	—	September 2, 2010	Mount Lemmon	Mount Lemmon Survey	·	2.4 km	MPC; JPL
589730	2010 RU_{197}	—	May 27, 2014	Mount Lemmon	Mount Lemmon Survey	·	2.1 km	MPC; JPL
589731	2010 RW_{197}	—	September 4, 2010	Mount Lemmon	Mount Lemmon Survey	·	1.6 km	MPC; JPL
589732	2010 RB_{201}	—	March 7, 2016	Haleakala	Pan-STARRS 1	V	480 m	MPC; JPL
589733	2010 RV_{201}	—	September 15, 2010	Mount Lemmon	Mount Lemmon Survey	·	2.2 km	MPC; JPL
589734	2010 RG_{202}	—	September 3, 2010	Mount Lemmon	Mount Lemmon Survey	·	1.9 km	MPC; JPL
589735	2010 RO_{204}	—	July 19, 2015	Haleakala	Pan-STARRS 2	·	2.0 km	MPC; JPL
589736	2010 RY_{206}	—	September 4, 2010	Mount Lemmon	Mount Lemmon Survey	·	2.2 km	MPC; JPL
589737	2010 RY_{208}	—	September 14, 2010	Mount Lemmon	Mount Lemmon Survey	EOS	1.5 km	MPC; JPL
589738	2010 RX_{209}	—	September 5, 2010	Mount Lemmon	Mount Lemmon Survey	·	2.6 km	MPC; JPL
589739	2010 RJ_{213}	—	September 11, 2010	Kitt Peak	Spacewatch	·	2.5 km	MPC; JPL
589740	2010 SX	—	September 16, 2010	Mount Lemmon	Mount Lemmon Survey	·	2.0 km	MPC; JPL
589741	2010 SB_{6}	—	May 3, 2008	Mount Lemmon	Mount Lemmon Survey	·	3.2 km	MPC; JPL
589742	2010 SZ_{10}	—	September 18, 2010	Kitt Peak	Spacewatch	·	1.4 km	MPC; JPL
589743	2010 SK_{14}	—	March 29, 2008	Mount Lemmon	Mount Lemmon Survey	VER	2.0 km	MPC; JPL
589744	2010 SL_{17}	—	September 2, 2010	Mount Lemmon	Mount Lemmon Survey	EOS	1.6 km	MPC; JPL
589745	2010 SJ_{18}	—	September 27, 2010	Charleston	R. Holmes	·	2.5 km	MPC; JPL
589746	2010 SE_{22}	—	September 29, 2010	Mount Lemmon	Mount Lemmon Survey	·	2.4 km	MPC; JPL
589747	2010 SX_{22}	—	September 29, 2010	Mount Lemmon	Mount Lemmon Survey	·	2.7 km	MPC; JPL
589748	2010 SD_{25}	—	September 29, 2010	Mount Lemmon	Mount Lemmon Survey	·	2.3 km	MPC; JPL
589749	2010 SY_{27}	—	September 29, 2010	Kitt Peak	Spacewatch	VER	2.2 km	MPC; JPL
589750	2010 SD_{34}	—	September 30, 2010	Catalina	CSS	TIR	2.2 km	MPC; JPL
589751	2010 ST_{36}	—	September 29, 2010	Mount Lemmon	Mount Lemmon Survey	·	1.1 km	MPC; JPL
589752	2010 SE_{41}	—	September 17, 2010	Mount Lemmon	Mount Lemmon Survey	·	1.1 km	MPC; JPL
589753	2010 SH_{43}	—	September 1, 2010	Mount Lemmon	Mount Lemmon Survey	·	2.0 km	MPC; JPL
589754	2010 ST_{45}	—	February 20, 2012	Kitt Peak	Spacewatch	PHO	630 m	MPC; JPL
589755	2010 SV_{45}	—	September 30, 2010	Mount Lemmon	Mount Lemmon Survey	·	2.5 km	MPC; JPL
589756	2010 SC_{46}	—	January 25, 2012	Haleakala	Pan-STARRS 1	·	2.2 km	MPC; JPL
589757	2010 SN_{46}	—	September 18, 2010	Mount Lemmon	Mount Lemmon Survey	H	450 m	MPC; JPL
589758	2010 SS_{47}	—	January 14, 2016	Haleakala	Pan-STARRS 1	·	1.0 km	MPC; JPL
589759	2010 SJ_{50}	—	March 8, 2013	Haleakala	Pan-STARRS 1	EOS	1.5 km	MPC; JPL
589760	2010 SH_{51}	—	September 17, 2010	Mount Lemmon	Mount Lemmon Survey	·	2.5 km	MPC; JPL
589761	2010 SN_{52}	—	April 30, 2014	Haleakala	Pan-STARRS 1	EOS	1.6 km	MPC; JPL
589762	2010 ST_{52}	—	September 30, 2010	Mount Lemmon	Mount Lemmon Survey	·	830 m	MPC; JPL
589763	2010 SD_{56}	—	September 19, 2010	Kitt Peak	Spacewatch	VER	2.0 km	MPC; JPL
589764	2010 TV	—	September 12, 2010	Kitt Peak	Spacewatch	EOS	1.7 km	MPC; JPL
589765	2010 TX_{2}	—	October 22, 2005	Kitt Peak	Spacewatch	·	1.7 km	MPC; JPL
589766	2010 TE_{9}	—	February 13, 2003	La Silla	Michelsen, R., G. Masi	·	1.6 km	MPC; JPL
589767	2010 TH_{14}	—	September 10, 2010	Kitt Peak	Spacewatch	·	1.9 km	MPC; JPL
589768	2010 TA_{16}	—	October 3, 2010	Kitt Peak	Spacewatch	EOS	2.0 km	MPC; JPL
589769	2010 TE_{16}	—	October 3, 2010	Kitt Peak	Spacewatch	·	2.0 km	MPC; JPL
589770	2010 TE_{19}	—	November 21, 2008	Mount Lemmon	Mount Lemmon Survey	H	640 m	MPC; JPL
589771	2010 TY_{21}	—	October 1, 2010	Kitt Peak	Spacewatch	EOS	1.5 km	MPC; JPL
589772	2010 TK_{26}	—	April 15, 2008	Kitt Peak	Spacewatch	·	2.7 km	MPC; JPL
589773	2010 TG_{27}	—	October 1, 2005	Mount Lemmon	Mount Lemmon Survey	EOS	1.5 km	MPC; JPL
589774	2010 TA_{30}	—	October 2, 2010	Kitt Peak	Spacewatch	PHO	530 m	MPC; JPL
589775	2010 TQ_{39}	—	October 2, 2010	Kitt Peak	Spacewatch	·	2.3 km	MPC; JPL
589776	2010 TU_{47}	—	July 11, 2004	Palomar	NEAT	TIR	3.1 km	MPC; JPL
589777	2010 TF_{48}	—	November 29, 2003	Kitt Peak	Spacewatch	·	910 m	MPC; JPL
589778	2010 TH_{48}	—	October 27, 2005	Kitt Peak	Spacewatch	·	2.0 km	MPC; JPL
589779	2010 TP_{58}	—	September 15, 2010	Kitt Peak	Spacewatch	TIR	2.1 km	MPC; JPL
589780 Ajka	2010 TT_{58}	Ajka	October 7, 2010	Piszkéstető	K. Sárneczky, Z. Kuli	·	3.7 km	MPC; JPL
589781	2010 TX_{64}	—	October 7, 2010	Mount Lemmon	Mount Lemmon Survey	·	1.3 km	MPC; JPL
589782	2010 TS_{67}	—	September 18, 2010	Mount Lemmon	Mount Lemmon Survey	H	480 m	MPC; JPL
589783	2010 TY_{70}	—	October 8, 1999	Kitt Peak	Spacewatch	·	880 m	MPC; JPL
589784	2010 TY_{75}	—	October 8, 2010	Kitt Peak	Spacewatch	·	2.4 km	MPC; JPL
589785	2010 TA_{78}	—	October 8, 2010	Kitt Peak	Spacewatch	MAS	690 m	MPC; JPL
589786	2010 TY_{81}	—	October 9, 2010	Bergisch Gladbach	W. Bickel	·	1.2 km	MPC; JPL
589787	2010 TG_{84}	—	October 9, 2010	Kitt Peak	Spacewatch	EUP	2.1 km	MPC; JPL
589788	2010 TL_{89}	—	September 16, 2010	Kitt Peak	Spacewatch	·	1.8 km	MPC; JPL
589789	2010 TV_{92}	—	April 29, 2008	Mount Lemmon	Mount Lemmon Survey	·	2.6 km	MPC; JPL
589790	2010 TB_{97}	—	September 19, 2010	Kitt Peak	Spacewatch	·	2.5 km	MPC; JPL
589791	2010 TW_{98}	—	October 9, 2010	Desert Moon	Stevens, B. L.	·	2.1 km	MPC; JPL
589792	2010 TH_{105}	—	September 28, 1997	Kitt Peak	Spacewatch	·	1.4 km	MPC; JPL
589793	2010 TM_{108}	—	February 28, 2009	Kitt Peak	Spacewatch	MAS	710 m	MPC; JPL
589794	2010 TU_{113}	—	October 9, 2010	Kitt Peak	Spacewatch	VER	2.0 km	MPC; JPL
589795	2010 TK_{114}	—	September 16, 2010	Kitt Peak	Spacewatch	·	2.2 km	MPC; JPL
589796	2010 TN_{117}	—	October 9, 2010	Mount Lemmon	Mount Lemmon Survey	MAS	620 m	MPC; JPL
589797	2010 TY_{119}	—	April 18, 2009	Mount Lemmon	Mount Lemmon Survey	·	2.0 km	MPC; JPL
589798	2010 TW_{121}	—	October 10, 2010	Kitt Peak	Spacewatch	·	920 m	MPC; JPL
589799	2010 TH_{126}	—	October 10, 2010	Kitt Peak	Spacewatch	·	2.3 km	MPC; JPL
589800	2010 TK_{130}	—	August 25, 2004	Kitt Peak	Spacewatch	·	2.7 km	MPC; JPL

== 589801–589900 ==
back to top

Designation			Discovery			Properties		Ref
Permanent	Provisional	Named after	Date	Site	Discoverer(s)	Category	Diam.	Ref
589801	2010 TW_{133}	—	February 21, 2007	Kitt Peak	Spacewatch	·	2.0 km	MPC; JPL
589802	2010 TV_{141}	—	October 11, 2010	Mount Lemmon	Mount Lemmon Survey	·	2.3 km	MPC; JPL
589803	2010 TF_{143}	—	September 16, 2010	Mount Lemmon	Mount Lemmon Survey	·	2.7 km	MPC; JPL
589804	2010 TO_{144}	—	October 11, 2010	Mount Lemmon	Mount Lemmon Survey	VER	2.4 km	MPC; JPL
589805	2010 TD_{153}	—	January 15, 2008	Mount Lemmon	Mount Lemmon Survey	·	980 m	MPC; JPL
589806	2010 TC_{155}	—	October 22, 2003	Kitt Peak	Spacewatch	·	1.1 km	MPC; JPL
589807	2010 TN_{163}	—	September 3, 2010	Mount Lemmon	Mount Lemmon Survey	·	2.1 km	MPC; JPL
589808	2010 TH_{166}	—	October 13, 2010	Tzec Maun	E. Schwab	·	1.1 km	MPC; JPL
589809	2010 TS_{166}	—	September 18, 2010	Mount Lemmon	Mount Lemmon Survey	·	2.2 km	MPC; JPL
589810	2010 TP_{169}	—	October 11, 2010	Mount Lemmon	Mount Lemmon Survey	·	2.4 km	MPC; JPL
589811	2010 TS_{172}	—	September 17, 2010	Mount Lemmon	Mount Lemmon Survey	THB	2.4 km	MPC; JPL
589812	2010 TM_{176}	—	September 16, 2010	Kitt Peak	Spacewatch	·	750 m	MPC; JPL
589813	2010 TV_{177}	—	July 22, 2010	Siding Spring	SSS	·	1.2 km	MPC; JPL
589814	2010 TL_{184}	—	October 8, 2010	Palomar	Palomar Transient Factory	·	3.0 km	MPC; JPL
589815	2010 TG_{186}	—	October 28, 2005	Kitt Peak	Spacewatch	·	2.8 km	MPC; JPL
589816	2010 TY_{195}	—	October 2, 2016	Mount Lemmon	Mount Lemmon Survey	(31811)	2.6 km	MPC; JPL
589817	2010 TL_{196}	—	February 18, 2013	Kitt Peak	Spacewatch	·	2.5 km	MPC; JPL
589818	2010 TO_{197}	—	June 13, 2010	Mount Lemmon	Mount Lemmon Survey	·	810 m	MPC; JPL
589819	2010 TP_{197}	—	March 29, 2008	Mount Bigelow	CSS	·	1.5 km	MPC; JPL
589820	2010 TF_{199}	—	October 9, 2010	Mount Lemmon	Mount Lemmon Survey	·	2.4 km	MPC; JPL
589821	2010 TH_{203}	—	July 25, 2015	Haleakala	Pan-STARRS 1	·	3.2 km	MPC; JPL
589822	2010 TZ_{204}	—	April 12, 2013	Haleakala	Pan-STARRS 1	NYS	790 m	MPC; JPL
589823	2010 TB_{207}	—	October 22, 2005	Kitt Peak	Spacewatch	·	2.9 km	MPC; JPL
589824	2010 TU_{207}	—	January 16, 2018	Haleakala	Pan-STARRS 1	·	2.2 km	MPC; JPL
589825	2010 TX_{207}	—	October 13, 2010	Mount Lemmon	Mount Lemmon Survey	·	900 m	MPC; JPL
589826	2010 TT_{209}	—	November 18, 2016	Mount Lemmon	Mount Lemmon Survey	VER	2.3 km	MPC; JPL
589827	2010 TY_{209}	—	October 14, 2010	Mount Lemmon	Mount Lemmon Survey	VER	1.9 km	MPC; JPL
589828	2010 TP_{212}	—	October 14, 2010	Mount Lemmon	Mount Lemmon Survey	VER	2.4 km	MPC; JPL
589829	2010 TS_{212}	—	October 12, 2010	Mount Lemmon	Mount Lemmon Survey	·	2.2 km	MPC; JPL
589830	2010 TU_{212}	—	October 1, 2010	Kitt Peak	Spacewatch	·	1.0 km	MPC; JPL
589831	2010 TY_{212}	—	October 2, 2010	Mount Lemmon	Mount Lemmon Survey	·	2.2 km	MPC; JPL
589832	2010 TZ_{213}	—	October 9, 2010	Mount Lemmon	Mount Lemmon Survey	·	2.4 km	MPC; JPL
589833	2010 TG_{214}	—	October 1, 2010	Kitt Peak	Spacewatch	·	1.8 km	MPC; JPL
589834	2010 TY_{215}	—	October 12, 2010	Mount Lemmon	Mount Lemmon Survey	L4	6.4 km	MPC; JPL
589835	2010 UP_{4}	—	October 17, 2010	Mount Lemmon	Mount Lemmon Survey	·	3.0 km	MPC; JPL
589836	2010 UB_{11}	—	August 16, 2006	Siding Spring	SSS	MAS	700 m	MPC; JPL
589837	2010 UE_{15}	—	November 18, 2003	Kitt Peak	Spacewatch	·	790 m	MPC; JPL
589838	2010 UL_{15}	—	February 28, 2008	Kitt Peak	Spacewatch	NYS	1.2 km	MPC; JPL
589839	2010 UH_{24}	—	September 16, 2004	Kitt Peak	Spacewatch	THM	2.2 km	MPC; JPL
589840	2010 UG_{26}	—	November 15, 1995	Kitt Peak	Spacewatch	MAS	610 m	MPC; JPL
589841 Strobl	2010 UP_{29}	Strobl	October 28, 2010	Piszkéstető	S. Kürti, K. Sárneczky	VER	2.1 km	MPC; JPL
589842	2010 UN_{37}	—	October 29, 2010	Catalina	CSS	LUT	5.3 km	MPC; JPL
589843	2010 UM_{40}	—	September 17, 2010	Mount Lemmon	Mount Lemmon Survey	·	2.7 km	MPC; JPL
589844	2010 UU_{40}	—	May 11, 2007	Mount Lemmon	Mount Lemmon Survey	·	2.8 km	MPC; JPL
589845	2010 UD_{62}	—	October 17, 2010	Mount Lemmon	Mount Lemmon Survey	H	570 m	MPC; JPL
589846	2010 UL_{62}	—	April 19, 2007	Mount Lemmon	Mount Lemmon Survey	·	2.6 km	MPC; JPL
589847	2010 UP_{64}	—	October 31, 2010	Piszkés-tető	K. Sárneczky, Z. Kuli	·	4.1 km	MPC; JPL
589848	2010 UV_{80}	—	February 21, 2007	Kitt Peak	Spacewatch	·	2.0 km	MPC; JPL
589849	2010 UF_{90}	—	February 28, 2008	Mount Lemmon	Mount Lemmon Survey	·	950 m	MPC; JPL
589850	2010 UD_{93}	—	October 13, 2010	Mount Lemmon	Mount Lemmon Survey	EOS	1.7 km	MPC; JPL
589851	2010 UK_{99}	—	September 3, 2010	Mount Lemmon	Mount Lemmon Survey	H	480 m	MPC; JPL
589852	2010 UC_{101}	—	October 12, 2010	Mount Lemmon	Mount Lemmon Survey	·	2.6 km	MPC; JPL
589853	2010 UH_{110}	—	August 27, 2006	Kitt Peak	Spacewatch	·	890 m	MPC; JPL
589854	2010 UZ_{110}	—	October 12, 2016	Haleakala	Pan-STARRS 1	·	2.6 km	MPC; JPL
589855	2010 UE_{111}	—	November 24, 2011	Haleakala	Pan-STARRS 1	·	2.7 km	MPC; JPL
589856	2010 UQ_{111}	—	December 28, 2011	Mount Lemmon	Mount Lemmon Survey	·	3.0 km	MPC; JPL
589857	2010 UT_{111}	—	October 17, 2010	Mount Lemmon	Mount Lemmon Survey	·	2.9 km	MPC; JPL
589858	2010 UW_{111}	—	December 29, 2011	Mount Lemmon	Mount Lemmon Survey	·	2.4 km	MPC; JPL
589859	2010 UU_{113}	—	October 17, 2010	Mount Lemmon	Mount Lemmon Survey	TIR	1.9 km	MPC; JPL
589860	2010 UO_{117}	—	September 18, 2010	Mount Lemmon	Mount Lemmon Survey	·	2.8 km	MPC; JPL
589861	2010 UF_{119}	—	October 28, 2010	Mount Lemmon	Mount Lemmon Survey	·	2.5 km	MPC; JPL
589862	2010 UM_{122}	—	October 28, 2010	Mount Lemmon	Mount Lemmon Survey	·	2.3 km	MPC; JPL
589863	2010 UQ_{122}	—	October 31, 2010	Mount Lemmon	Mount Lemmon Survey	·	2.8 km	MPC; JPL
589864	2010 UE_{123}	—	October 30, 2010	Kitt Peak	Spacewatch	L4	7.8 km	MPC; JPL
589865	2010 UV_{127}	—	October 30, 2010	Mount Lemmon	Mount Lemmon Survey	·	2.6 km	MPC; JPL
589866	2010 VO_{5}	—	November 1, 2010	Mount Lemmon	Mount Lemmon Survey	L4	6.8 km	MPC; JPL
589867	2010 VX_{18}	—	October 11, 2010	Catalina	CSS	H	530 m	MPC; JPL
589868	2010 VL_{19}	—	November 2, 2010	Kitt Peak	Spacewatch	L4	6.5 km	MPC; JPL
589869	2010 VP_{23}	—	November 19, 2003	Kitt Peak	Spacewatch	·	980 m	MPC; JPL
589870	2010 VK_{24}	—	November 1, 2010	Kitt Peak	Spacewatch	L4	7.5 km	MPC; JPL
589871	2010 VQ_{27}	—	August 20, 2006	Palomar	NEAT	·	1.2 km	MPC; JPL
589872	2010 VZ_{36}	—	August 12, 2006	Palomar	NEAT	·	1.4 km	MPC; JPL
589873	2010 VP_{41}	—	August 14, 2015	Haleakala	Pan-STARRS 1	·	2.2 km	MPC; JPL
589874	2010 VK_{44}	—	September 18, 2010	Mount Lemmon	Mount Lemmon Survey	·	2.7 km	MPC; JPL
589875	2010 VM_{44}	—	October 11, 2010	Mount Lemmon	Mount Lemmon Survey	·	1.2 km	MPC; JPL
589876	2010 VL_{51}	—	November 3, 2010	Kitt Peak	Spacewatch	·	1.2 km	MPC; JPL
589877	2010 VR_{52}	—	October 14, 2009	Mount Lemmon	Mount Lemmon Survey	L4	6.7 km	MPC; JPL
589878	2010 VF_{59}	—	September 15, 2004	Kitt Peak	Spacewatch	·	2.6 km	MPC; JPL
589879	2010 VY_{69}	—	November 5, 2010	Kitt Peak	Spacewatch	L4	7.5 km	MPC; JPL
589880	2010 VL_{82}	—	November 3, 2010	Mount Lemmon	Mount Lemmon Survey	ELF	2.9 km	MPC; JPL
589881	2010 VQ_{93}	—	September 15, 2009	Kitt Peak	Spacewatch	L4	5.8 km	MPC; JPL
589882	2010 VE_{107}	—	November 6, 2010	Kitt Peak	Spacewatch	L4	6.9 km	MPC; JPL
589883	2010 VL_{107}	—	October 13, 2010	Mount Lemmon	Mount Lemmon Survey	·	2.5 km	MPC; JPL
589884	2010 VB_{111}	—	November 6, 2010	Socorro	LINEAR	T_{j} (2.99)	3.8 km	MPC; JPL
589885	2010 VW_{114}	—	September 23, 1995	Kitt Peak	Spacewatch	L4	9.7 km	MPC; JPL
589886	2010 VO_{115}	—	November 7, 2010	Mount Lemmon	Mount Lemmon Survey	L4	7.6 km	MPC; JPL
589887 Fellnerjakab	2010 VH_{117}	Fellnerjakab	October 31, 2010	Piszkéstető	K. Sárneczky, Z. Kuli	·	4.1 km	MPC; JPL
589888	2010 VF_{121}	—	November 8, 2010	Kitt Peak	Spacewatch	·	3.0 km	MPC; JPL
589889	2010 VD_{123}	—	October 16, 2006	Kitt Peak	Spacewatch	V	630 m	MPC; JPL
589890	2010 VN_{126}	—	October 23, 1995	Kitt Peak	Spacewatch	NYS	1.0 km	MPC; JPL
589891	2010 VG_{128}	—	November 1, 2010	Mount Lemmon	Mount Lemmon Survey	·	3.2 km	MPC; JPL
589892	2010 VQ_{129}	—	September 30, 2006	Mount Lemmon	Mount Lemmon Survey	NYS	1.0 km	MPC; JPL
589893	2010 VG_{130}	—	June 5, 2005	Junk Bond	D. Healy	NYS	1.2 km	MPC; JPL
589894	2010 VO_{145}	—	June 8, 2005	Kitt Peak	Spacewatch	·	1.0 km	MPC; JPL
589895	2010 VX_{156}	—	October 9, 2010	Mount Lemmon	Mount Lemmon Survey	·	2.4 km	MPC; JPL
589896	2010 VM_{164}	—	November 10, 2010	Mount Lemmon	Mount Lemmon Survey	L4	9.5 km	MPC; JPL
589897	2010 VY_{164}	—	September 14, 2004	Palomar	NEAT	URS	3.9 km	MPC; JPL
589898	2010 VN_{165}	—	November 6, 2010	Kitt Peak	Spacewatch	EUP	3.3 km	MPC; JPL
589899	2010 VE_{168}	—	October 28, 2010	Mount Lemmon	Mount Lemmon Survey	·	1.9 km	MPC; JPL
589900	2010 VT_{171}	—	January 23, 2006	Mount Lemmon	Mount Lemmon Survey	·	2.5 km	MPC; JPL

== 589901–590000 ==
back to top

Designation			Discovery			Properties		Ref
Permanent	Provisional	Named after	Date	Site	Discoverer(s)	Category	Diam.	Ref
589901	2010 VU_{183}	—	November 12, 2010	Kitt Peak	Spacewatch	·	2.9 km	MPC; JPL
589902	2010 VQ_{192}	—	November 11, 2010	Kitt Peak	Spacewatch	L4	6.7 km	MPC; JPL
589903	2010 VE_{201}	—	November 4, 2010	Mayhill-ISON	L. Elenin	·	1.3 km	MPC; JPL
589904	2010 VF_{204}	—	November 13, 2010	Mount Lemmon	Mount Lemmon Survey	·	2.9 km	MPC; JPL
589905	2010 VW_{204}	—	November 8, 2010	Mount Lemmon	Mount Lemmon Survey	T_{j} (2.99)	4.2 km	MPC; JPL
589906	2010 VK_{205}	—	September 18, 2010	Mount Lemmon	Mount Lemmon Survey	URS	2.4 km	MPC; JPL
589907	2010 VP_{212}	—	October 30, 2010	Catalina	CSS	TIR	2.5 km	MPC; JPL
589908	2010 VO_{219}	—	October 31, 2010	Kitt Peak	Spacewatch	LUT	4.0 km	MPC; JPL
589909	2010 VB_{225}	—	October 16, 2009	Mount Lemmon	Mount Lemmon Survey	L4	5.6 km	MPC; JPL
589910	2010 VJ_{228}	—	March 18, 2009	Mount Lemmon	Mount Lemmon Survey	H	570 m	MPC; JPL
589911	2010 VY_{229}	—	November 26, 2011	Mount Lemmon	Mount Lemmon Survey	·	3.3 km	MPC; JPL
589912	2010 VA_{230}	—	July 11, 2009	Kitt Peak	Spacewatch	·	3.9 km	MPC; JPL
589913	2010 VQ_{230}	—	November 2, 2010	Mount Lemmon	Mount Lemmon Survey	·	2.7 km	MPC; JPL
589914	2010 VQ_{231}	—	July 28, 2014	Haleakala	Pan-STARRS 1	·	3.1 km	MPC; JPL
589915	2010 VU_{232}	—	November 17, 2014	Mount Lemmon	Mount Lemmon Survey	·	1.3 km	MPC; JPL
589916	2010 VG_{235}	—	August 21, 2015	Haleakala	Pan-STARRS 1	VER	1.9 km	MPC; JPL
589917	2010 VO_{235}	—	November 1, 2010	Mount Lemmon	Mount Lemmon Survey	·	1.6 km	MPC; JPL
589918	2010 VN_{239}	—	November 6, 2010	Catalina	CSS	EUP	3.1 km	MPC; JPL
589919	2010 VV_{240}	—	December 23, 2017	Haleakala	Pan-STARRS 1	·	2.8 km	MPC; JPL
589920	2010 VL_{242}	—	November 13, 2010	Mount Lemmon	Mount Lemmon Survey	·	2.6 km	MPC; JPL
589921	2010 VN_{246}	—	August 15, 2013	Haleakala	Pan-STARRS 1	·	520 m	MPC; JPL
589922	2010 VP_{246}	—	July 23, 2015	Haleakala	Pan-STARRS 1	·	2.0 km	MPC; JPL
589923	2010 VG_{253}	—	November 4, 2010	Mount Lemmon	Mount Lemmon Survey	·	3.7 km	MPC; JPL
589924	2010 VU_{253}	—	October 22, 2009	Mount Lemmon	Mount Lemmon Survey	L4	7.2 km	MPC; JPL
589925	2010 VA_{254}	—	November 13, 2010	Kitt Peak	Spacewatch	·	3.2 km	MPC; JPL
589926	2010 VE_{254}	—	November 13, 2010	Mount Lemmon	Mount Lemmon Survey	·	2.7 km	MPC; JPL
589927	2010 VM_{254}	—	November 1, 2010	Mount Lemmon	Mount Lemmon Survey	L4	7.3 km	MPC; JPL
589928	2010 VN_{254}	—	November 10, 2010	Mount Lemmon	Mount Lemmon Survey	·	3.0 km	MPC; JPL
589929	2010 VQ_{254}	—	November 8, 2010	Kitt Peak	Spacewatch	·	3.0 km	MPC; JPL
589930	2010 VR_{254}	—	November 5, 2010	Mount Lemmon	Mount Lemmon Survey	L4	6.4 km	MPC; JPL
589931	2010 VB_{255}	—	November 12, 2010	Mount Lemmon	Mount Lemmon Survey	L4	7.9 km	MPC; JPL
589932	2010 VC_{255}	—	November 3, 2010	Mount Lemmon	Mount Lemmon Survey	L4	6.8 km	MPC; JPL
589933	2010 VO_{256}	—	November 4, 2010	Mount Lemmon	Mount Lemmon Survey	·	2.5 km	MPC; JPL
589934	2010 VY_{257}	—	November 12, 2010	Mount Lemmon	Mount Lemmon Survey	L4	7.5 km	MPC; JPL
589935	2010 VJ_{259}	—	November 13, 2010	Mount Lemmon	Mount Lemmon Survey	L4	8.3 km	MPC; JPL
589936	2010 VR_{259}	—	November 14, 2010	Mount Lemmon	Mount Lemmon Survey	EOS	1.5 km	MPC; JPL
589937	2010 VX_{261}	—	November 14, 2010	Mount Lemmon	Mount Lemmon Survey	L4	6.0 km	MPC; JPL
589938	2010 VV_{262}	—	November 8, 2010	Mount Lemmon	Mount Lemmon Survey	L4	8.1 km	MPC; JPL
589939	2010 VA_{263}	—	November 13, 2010	Mount Lemmon	Mount Lemmon Survey	L4 · ERY	6.0 km	MPC; JPL
589940	2010 VJ_{263}	—	November 1, 2010	Mount Lemmon	Mount Lemmon Survey	L4	7.0 km	MPC; JPL
589941	2010 VA_{264}	—	November 3, 2010	Mount Lemmon	Mount Lemmon Survey	·	1.2 km	MPC; JPL
589942	2010 VU_{266}	—	November 14, 2010	Mount Lemmon	Mount Lemmon Survey	·	2.9 km	MPC; JPL
589943	2010 VH_{267}	—	November 13, 2010	Mount Lemmon	Mount Lemmon Survey	PHO	680 m	MPC; JPL
589944 Suhua	2010 WW_{3}	Suhua	November 26, 2010	Xingming	Ruan, J., X. Gao	·	3.5 km	MPC; JPL
589945	2010 WU_{4}	—	November 11, 2010	Mount Lemmon	Mount Lemmon Survey	L4	7.2 km	MPC; JPL
589946	2010 WO_{5}	—	October 29, 2010	Kitt Peak	Spacewatch	·	3.6 km	MPC; JPL
589947	2010 WK_{7}	—	November 11, 2010	Kitt Peak	Spacewatch	L4 · ERY	6.7 km	MPC; JPL
589948	2010 WK_{10}	—	April 1, 2003	Apache Point	SDSS Collaboration	L4	10 km	MPC; JPL
589949	2010 WV_{12}	—	November 26, 2010	Mount Lemmon	Mount Lemmon Survey	·	2.1 km	MPC; JPL
589950	2010 WU_{33}	—	November 11, 2010	Mount Lemmon	Mount Lemmon Survey	·	2.7 km	MPC; JPL
589951	2010 WM_{43}	—	November 27, 2010	Mount Lemmon	Mount Lemmon Survey	L4	7.2 km	MPC; JPL
589952	2010 WE_{61}	—	September 15, 2009	Mount Lemmon	Mount Lemmon Survey	·	2.0 km	MPC; JPL
589953	2010 WJ_{64}	—	November 14, 2010	Sandlot	G. Hug	·	4.1 km	MPC; JPL
589954	2010 WU_{74}	—	November 27, 2010	Palomar	Palomar Transient Factory	·	2.8 km	MPC; JPL
589955	2010 WQ_{75}	—	February 3, 2012	Mount Lemmon	Mount Lemmon Survey	·	2.9 km	MPC; JPL
589956	2010 WR_{76}	—	April 4, 2013	Haleakala	Pan-STARRS 1	VER	2.4 km	MPC; JPL
589957	2010 WS_{77}	—	May 21, 2014	Haleakala	Pan-STARRS 1	THM	2.0 km	MPC; JPL
589958	2010 WP_{79}	—	November 25, 2010	Mount Lemmon	Mount Lemmon Survey	L4	6.6 km	MPC; JPL
589959	2010 XY_{1}	—	October 31, 2006	Mount Lemmon	Mount Lemmon Survey	V	570 m	MPC; JPL
589960	2010 XJ_{9}	—	November 4, 2010	Mount Lemmon	Mount Lemmon Survey	·	3.2 km	MPC; JPL
589961	2010 XE_{24}	—	November 12, 2010	Kitt Peak	Spacewatch	·	2.4 km	MPC; JPL
589962	2010 XP_{34}	—	December 2, 2010	Mount Lemmon	Mount Lemmon Survey	L4 · ERY	6.6 km	MPC; JPL
589963	2010 XH_{38}	—	October 2, 2005	Mount Lemmon	Mount Lemmon Survey	·	1.4 km	MPC; JPL
589964	2010 XX_{40}	—	December 4, 2010	Piszkés-tető	K. Sárneczky, Z. Kuli	L4	7.5 km	MPC; JPL
589965	2010 XY_{43}	—	December 6, 2010	Zelenchukskaya Stn	T. V. Krjačko, Satovski, B.	·	2.8 km	MPC; JPL
589966	2010 XZ_{47}	—	March 18, 2007	Mount Nyukasa	Japan Aerospace Exploration Agency	VER	2.9 km	MPC; JPL
589967	2010 XW_{50}	—	November 13, 2010	Mount Lemmon	Mount Lemmon Survey	(5)	880 m	MPC; JPL
589968	2010 XQ_{53}	—	November 1, 2010	Kitt Peak	Spacewatch	L4	8.7 km	MPC; JPL
589969	2010 XZ_{69}	—	August 20, 2006	Palomar	NEAT	NYS	910 m	MPC; JPL
589970	2010 XO_{77}	—	December 3, 2010	Mount Lemmon	Mount Lemmon Survey	LIX	2.7 km	MPC; JPL
589971	2010 XB_{91}	—	November 2, 2010	Mount Lemmon	Mount Lemmon Survey	L4	7.2 km	MPC; JPL
589972	2010 XK_{96}	—	January 26, 2012	Mount Lemmon	Mount Lemmon Survey	·	2.5 km	MPC; JPL
589973	2010 XP_{104}	—	July 25, 2015	Haleakala	Pan-STARRS 1	·	2.6 km	MPC; JPL
589974	2010 XO_{109}	—	December 14, 2010	Mount Lemmon	Mount Lemmon Survey	·	1.1 km	MPC; JPL
589975	2010 XW_{110}	—	December 9, 2010	Kitt Peak	Spacewatch	·	950 m	MPC; JPL
589976	2010 XC_{111}	—	December 2, 2010	Mount Lemmon	Mount Lemmon Survey	·	2.7 km	MPC; JPL
589977	2010 XB_{113}	—	December 5, 2010	Mount Lemmon	Mount Lemmon Survey	·	2.9 km	MPC; JPL
589978	2010 YG_{6}	—	December 25, 2010	Mount Lemmon	Mount Lemmon Survey	LIX	2.8 km	MPC; JPL
589979	2010 YM_{6}	—	August 15, 2013	Haleakala	Pan-STARRS 1	·	1.0 km	MPC; JPL
589980	2011 AR_{11}	—	November 24, 2002	Palomar	NEAT	NYS	1.1 km	MPC; JPL
589981	2011 AQ_{12}	—	January 2, 2011	Mount Lemmon	Mount Lemmon Survey	·	970 m	MPC; JPL
589982	2011 AG_{15}	—	July 28, 2005	Palomar	NEAT	·	1.9 km	MPC; JPL
589983	2011 AS_{16}	—	December 2, 2010	Mayhill-ISON	L. Elenin	·	2.8 km	MPC; JPL
589984	2011 AU_{16}	—	November 1, 2010	Kitt Peak	Spacewatch	·	4.4 km	MPC; JPL
589985	2011 AM_{17}	—	October 17, 2010	Mount Lemmon	Mount Lemmon Survey	·	3.3 km	MPC; JPL
589986	2011 AD_{18}	—	December 7, 2010	Mount Lemmon	Mount Lemmon Survey	·	3.6 km	MPC; JPL
589987	2011 AX_{28}	—	November 7, 2002	Kitt Peak	Spacewatch	·	1.6 km	MPC; JPL
589988	2011 AJ_{58}	—	January 12, 2011	ESA OGS	ESA OGS	V	720 m	MPC; JPL
589989	2011 AY_{70}	—	December 13, 2006	Kitt Peak	Spacewatch	·	840 m	MPC; JPL
589990	2011 AP_{81}	—	January 28, 2000	Kitt Peak	Spacewatch	EOS	2.1 km	MPC; JPL
589991	2011 AH_{89}	—	January 10, 2011	Kitt Peak	Spacewatch	MAR	810 m	MPC; JPL
589992	2011 AV_{91}	—	August 12, 2013	Haleakala	Pan-STARRS 1	·	980 m	MPC; JPL
589993	2011 AR_{92}	—	October 12, 2013	Mount Lemmon	Mount Lemmon Survey	·	840 m	MPC; JPL
589994	2011 AU_{92}	—	December 25, 2005	Kitt Peak	Spacewatch	·	1.3 km	MPC; JPL
589995	2011 AV_{98}	—	January 12, 2011	Mount Lemmon	Mount Lemmon Survey	·	800 m	MPC; JPL
589996	2011 BA_{16}	—	January 24, 2011	Alder Springs	Levin, K.	·	820 m	MPC; JPL
589997	2011 BS_{16}	—	January 24, 2011	Kitt Peak	Spacewatch	·	1.5 km	MPC; JPL
589998	2011 BU_{17}	—	November 17, 2006	Mount Lemmon	Mount Lemmon Survey	·	1.1 km	MPC; JPL
589999	2011 BA_{29}	—	March 7, 2003	Nogales	P. R. Holvorcem, M. Schwartz	·	960 m	MPC; JPL
590000	2011 BU_{31}	—	January 26, 2011	Mount Lemmon	Mount Lemmon Survey	·	1.7 km	MPC; JPL

back to top

== Meaning of names ==
As minor planet discoveries are confirmed, they are given a permanent number by the IAU's Minor Planet Center (MPC), and the discoverers can then submit names for them, following the IAU's naming conventions. The list below concerns those minor planets in the specified number-range that have received names, and explains the meanings of those names.

Official naming citations of newly named small Solar System bodies are approved and published in a bulletin by IAU's Working Group for Small Bodies Nomenclature (WGSBN). Before May 2021, citations were published in MPC's Minor Planet Circulars for many decades. Recent citations can also be found on the JPL Small-Body Database (SBDB). Until his death in 2016, German astronomer Lutz D. Schmadel compiled these citations into the Dictionary of Minor Planet Names (DMP) and regularly updated the collection.

Based on Paul Herget's The Names of the Minor Planets, Schmadel also researched the unclear origin of numerous asteroids, most of which had been named prior to World War II. This article incorporates text from this source, which is in the public domain: SBDB New namings may only be added to this list below after official publication as the preannouncement of names is condemned. The WGSBN publishes a comprehensive guideline for the naming rules of non-cometary small Solar System bodies.

Named minor planet	Provisional	This minor planet was named for...	Ref; Catalog
589175 Romainguélat	2009 HN_{118}	Romain Guélat, Swiss TV and radio director and photographer.	IAU · 589175
589253 Fabrika	2009 SY_{1}	Sergei Fabrika, Russian astronomer and professor at the Special Astrophysical Observatory.	IAU · 589253
589360 Yulialinde	2009 UT_{126}	Yulia Linde, Russian children's author and film director.	IAU · 589360
589718 Csopak	2010 RY_{173}	Csopak, a Hungarian village on the northern shore of Lake Balaton.	IAU · 589718
589780 Ajka	2010 TT_{58}	Ajka, an industrial town in central-west Hungary.	IAU · 589780
589841 Strobl	2010 UP_{29}	Alajos Strobl (1856–1926), a Hungarian sculptor and painter.	IAU · 589841
589887 Fellnerjakab	2010 VH_{117}	Jakab Fellner (1722–1780), Moravian-born Hungarian architect.	IAU · 589887
589944 Suhua	2010 WW_{3}	Hua Su (born 1972), a Chinese amateur astronomer from Yiyang, Hunan, who has found more than 200 SOHO comets.	IAU · 589944
