= 2000 DG8 =

Minor planet

2000 DG_{8}
Discovery
- Discovered by: LINEAR
- Discovery site: Lincoln Lab ETS
- Discovery date: 25 February 2000 (first observed only)

Designations
- Minor planet category: centaur · damocloid unusual · distant

Orbital characteristics
- Epoch 21 November 2025 (JD 2461000.5)
- Uncertainty parameter 4
- Observation arc: 342 days
- Aphelion: 19.290 AU
- Perihelion: 2.2374 AU
- Semi-major axis: 10.764 AU
- Eccentricity: 0.7921
- Orbital period (sidereal): 35.31 yr (12,898 d)
- Mean anomaly: 253.61°
- Mean motion: 0° 1^{m} 40.44^{s} / day
- Inclination: 129.47°
- Longitude of ascending node: 279.34°
- Argument of perihelion: 222.27°
- T_{Jupiter}: -0.633

Physical characteristics
- Mean diameter: 15.6±2.6 km 17.28 km
- Geometric albedo: 0.027; 0.053±0.017
- Absolute magnitude (H): 13.1

2000 DG_{8} is a dark centaur and damocloid on a retrograde and highly eccentric orbit from the outer region of the Solar System. It was first observed on 25 February 2000, by astronomers with the LINEAR program at the Lincoln Lab's ETS near Socorro, New Mexico, United States. It has not been observed since 2001. The unusual object measures approximately 16 kilometers (9.9 miles) in diameter.

== Discovery ==
2000 DG_{8} was first observed on 25 February 2000, by astronomers of the Lincoln Near-Earth Asteroid Research (LINEAR) at the Lincoln Laboratory's Experimental Test Site near Socorro, New Mexico, United States.

== Orbit and classification ==
2000 DG_{8} is a member of the dynamically unstable centaur and damocloid population. Given the body's dark surface and its cometary-like orbit, it may be a dormant comet.

It orbits the Sun at a distance of 2.2–19.3 AU once every 35 years and 4 months (12,893 days; semi-major axis of 10.76 AU). Its orbit has a high eccentricity of 0.79 and an inclination of 129° with respect to the ecliptic. With an inclination above 90°, It is one of about 100 known minor planets with a retrograde orbit around the Sun. The object also has a negative Tisserand's parameter.

The body's observation arc begins with its first observation at Socorro in February 2000. It was last observed in 2001 when it came to perihelion (closest approach to the Sun), and will next come to perihelion in April 2036. It was the third distant object with a retrograde orbit to be discovered, 8 months beaten by 20461 Dioretsa and (612093) 1999 LE31.

== Physical characteristics ==
According to radiometric observations published in 2001 and 2005, 2000 DG_{8} measures approximately 15.6±2.6 and 17.28 kilometers in diameter, with a corresponding albedo 0.053 and 0.027, respectively. As of 2018, no rotational lightcurve of this object has been obtained from photometric observations. The object's rotation period, pole and shape remain unknown.

== Numbering and naming ==
This minor planet has not been numbered by the Minor Planet Center and remains unnamed.

== See also ==
- (612093) 1999 LE31
- 2005 VX3
