= (127546) 2002 XU93 =

Trans-Neptunian object and centaur

(127546) 2002 XU_{93}
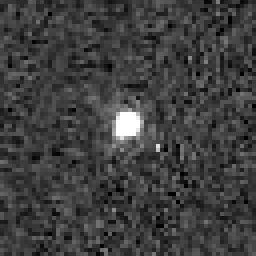
- Hubble Space Telescope image of 2002 XU_{93} taken in 2009

Discovery
- Discovered by: M. W. Buie
- Discovery site: Kitt Peak National Obs.
- Discovery date: 4 December 2002

Designations
- Minor planet category: TNO · centaur distant · damocloid

Orbital characteristics
- Epoch 23 March 2018 (JD 2458200.5)
- Uncertainty parameter 3
- Observation arc: 8.10 yr (2,957 days)
- Aphelion: 113.59 AU
- Perihelion: 21.003 AU
- Semi-major axis: 67.299 AU
- Eccentricity: 0.6879
- Orbital period (sidereal): 552.10 yr (201,654 d)
- Mean anomaly: 6.1786°
- Mean motion: 0° 0^{m} 6.48^{s} / day
- Inclination: 77.954°
- Longitude of ascending node: 90.404°
- Argument of perihelion: 28.135°
- T_{Jupiter}: 1.1670

Physical characteristics
- Mean diameter: 164 km (measured); 170±50 km 180 km (radiometric)
- Geometric albedo: 0.038; 0.040±0.030; 0.04 (radiometric)
- Spectral type: BB–BR; B–R = 1.2±0.02
- Absolute magnitude (H): 7.9 · 8.0

(127546) 2002 XU_{93} is a trans-Neptunian object and centaur on a highly inclined and eccentric orbit in the outer region of the Solar System. It measures approximately 170 kilometers (110 mi) in diameter and is one of few objects with such an unusual orbit. It was discovered on 4 December 2002, by American astronomer Marc Buie at the Kitt Peak National Observatory in Arizona, United States.

== Orbit and classification ==
2002 XU_{93} orbits the Sun at a distance of 21–114 AU once every 552 years and 1 month (201,654 days; semi-major axis of 67.3 AU). Its orbit has an eccentricity of 0.69 and an inclination of 78° with respect to the ecliptic. The body's observation arc begins with its official discovery observation at Kitt Peak in December 2002.

This object belongs to the short-lived population of centaurs. Generically, it is also classified as a trans-Neptunian object as its semi-major axis is larger than Neptune's 30.1 AU. Due to this highly inclined and eccentric orbit, and with a Tisserand's parameter of only 1.167, its cometary-like orbit resembles that of the damocloid and extended-centaur population. It is one of few objects with and inclination above 60° and a perihelion below 15 AU, along with the first discovered 2008 KV42.

== Physical characteristics ==
=== Spectrum and brightness ===
2002 XU_{93} has a BB–BR taxonomy type. It shows only a moderately red surface with a spectral gradient similar to the known comets, extinct comets, Jupiter trojans, Neptune trojans, irregular satellites and damocloids.

With a B–R magnitude of 1.2, the difference between the blue and red filter magnitude, it is still redder than the spectrum of the Sun (which is 1.02 mag). It has an absolute magnitude of 8.0.

=== Diameter and albedo ===
According to the survey carried out by the NEOWISE mission of NASA's Wide-field Infrared Survey Explorer, 2002 XU_{93} measures 170 kilometers in diameter and its surface has a low albedo of 0.04. Johnston's Archive gives a mean-diameter of 164 kilometers (102 mi) and albedo of 0.038 from various measurement, while astronomer Michael Brown gives an albedo of 0.04 and a diameter of 180 kilometers (110 mi) from radiometric observations, listing an absolute magnitude of 7.9. Due to its small size, Brown does not consider it to be a dwarf planet candidate, grouping it into the "probably not" category of his classification scheme (also see list of candidates).

=== Rotation period ===
As of 2018, no rotational lightcurve of this object has been obtained from photometric observations. The object's rotation period, pole and shape remain unknown.

== Numbering and naming ==
This minor planet was numbered by the Minor Planet Center on 14 March 2006 (M.P.C. 56238). It has not yet received an official name.
