= (65407) 2002 RP120 =

Trans-Neptunian object

(65407) 2002 RP_{120}
Discovery
- Discovered by: LONEOS
- Discovery site: Anderson Mesa Stn.
- Discovery date: 4 September 2002

Designations
- Minor planet category: TNO · damocloid unusual · distant

Orbital characteristics
- Epoch 27 April 2019 (JD 2458600.5)
- Uncertainty parameter 2
- Observation arc: 3.35 yr (1,225 d)
- Aphelion: 105.39 AU
- Perihelion: 2.4544 AU
- Semi-major axis: 53.920 AU
- Eccentricity: 0.9545
- Orbital period (sidereal): 395.95 yr (144,619 d)
- Mean anomaly: 15.061°
- Mean motion: 0° 0^{m} 9^{s} / day
- Inclination: 118.97°
- Longitude of ascending node: 39.263°
- Argument of perihelion: 357.79°
- T_{Jupiter}: −0.8340

Physical characteristics
- Mean diameter: 14.6±2.8 km
- Synodic rotation period: 200 h
- Geometric albedo: 0.098±0.036
- Spectral type: B–R = 1.37
- Absolute magnitude (H): 12.3

(65407) 2002 RP_{120} is a trans-Neptunian object and damocloid from the outer Solar System. Its orbit is retrograde and comet-like, and has a high eccentricity. It was discovered on 4 September 2002 by astronomers with the LONEOS survey at Anderson Mesa Station, Arizona, in the United States. The unusual object measures approximately 14.6 kilometers (9.1 miles) in diameter and is likely elongated in shape. It is a slow rotator and potentially a tumbler as well. The object was probably ejected from the ecliptic by Neptune.

== Orbit and classification ==
2002 RP_{120} is a member of the damocloids, with a retrograde orbit and a negative T_{Jupiter} of −0.8340. It is also a trans-Neptunian object, as its orbit has a semi-major axis larger than that of Neptune (30.1 AU). The Minor Planet Center lists it as a critical object, centaur, and (other) unusual minor planet due to an orbital eccentricity of more than 0.5.

It orbits the Sun at a distance of 2.5–105 AU once every 396 years (semi-major axis of 53.92 AU). Its orbit has an eccentricity of 0.95 and an inclination of 119° with respect to the ecliptic. The body's observation arc begins with a precovery taken by Astrovirtel (I03) at ESO's La Silla Observatory in February 2001, or 19 months prior to its official discovery observation at Anderson Mesa.

== Numbering and naming ==
This minor planet was permanently numbered (65407) by the Minor Planet Center on 14 June 2003 (M.P.C. 48994). As of 2018, it has not been named.

== Physical characteristics ==
The object has a B–R magnitude of 1.37, typical for most dynamical groups in the outer Solar System.

=== Rotation period ===
In October 2010, a rotational lightcurve of 2002 RP_{120} was obtained from photometric observations by French amateur astronomer René Roy. Lightcurve analysis gave a rotation period of 200 hours with a brightness amplitude of 0.6 magnitude, indicative of an elongated, non-spherical shape (U=2). With a rotation period above 100 hours, it is a typical slow rotator.

=== Diameter and albedo ===
According to the survey of minor-planet albedos of bodies in a comet-like orbit, carried out by Yanga Fernández in collaboration with David Jewitt and Scott Sheppard at the Institute for Astronomy, Hawaii, 2002 RP_{120} measures 14.6 kilometers in diameter and its surface has an albedo of 0.098. Johnston's archive gives a rounded figure of 15 kilometers.
