= (434620) 2005 VD =

Highly-inclined centaur

Discovery
- Discovered by: Mount Lemmon Srvy.
- Discovery site: Mount Lemmon Obs.
- Discovery date: 1 November 2005

Designations
- Minor planet category: centaur · damocloid unusual · distant

Orbital characteristics
- Epoch 27 April 2019 (JD 2458600.5)
- Uncertainty parameter 2
- Observation arc: 11.40 yr (4,163 d)
- Aphelion: 8.3535 AU
- Perihelion: 4.9956 AU
- Semi-major axis: 6.6746 AU
- Eccentricity: 0.2515
- Orbital period (sidereal): 17.24 yr (6,298 d)
- Mean anomaly: 275.05°
- Mean motion: 0° 3^{m} 25.92^{s} / day
- Inclination: 172.87°
- Longitude of ascending node: 173.31°
- Argument of perihelion: 177.92°
- Jupiter MOID: 0.0306 AU
- T_{Jupiter}: -1.3960

Physical characteristics
- Mean diameter: 6 km
- Geometric albedo: 0.04 (assumed dark); 0.09 (assumed)
- Spectral type: B–R = 1.05
- Absolute magnitude (H): 14.3

(434620) 2005 VD is a centaur and damocloid on a retrograde orbit from the outer Solar System, known for having the second most highly inclined orbit of any small Solar System body, behind 2013 LA2.

2005 VD was the most highly inclined known object between 2005 and 2013. The unusual object measures approximately 6 kilometers (3.7 miles) in diameter.

== Discovery ==
This minor planet was discovered on 1 November 2005, by astronomers of the Mount Lemmon Survey at Mount Lemmon Observatory near Tucson, Arizona. Precovery images have been found by the Sloan Digital Sky Survey (SDSS) from September 2005 and December 2001.

== Orbit ==
=== Classification ===
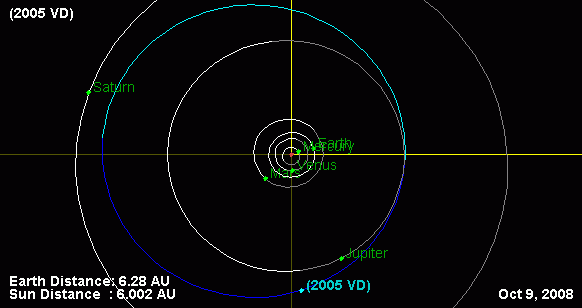
2005 VD has a semi-major axis greater than Jupiter and almost crosses the orbit of Jupiter when near perihelion.

2005 VD has a semi-major axis greater than Jupiter and almost crosses the orbit of Jupiter when near perihelion. JPL lists it as a current centaur. Both the Deep Ecliptic Survey (DES), and the Minor Planet Center (MPC) have listed it as a centaur (q_{min}=~5AU) at different epochs. The DES and MPC will list it as a centaur again in 2032.

Lowell Observatory also has it listed as a damocloid object.

2005 VD makes occasional close approaches to Jupiter, coming only 0.0817 AU (12.22 million km) from Jupiter in 1903, 0.0445 AU (6.66 million km) in 2057, and 0.077 AU (11.5 million km) in 2093. However it made a close approach to Jupiter when it was only 0.309 AU (46.2 million km) away from it on 17 December 2022 which was the closest it could get to Jupiter for the decade.

=== Dynamics ===
Being a highly dynamic object, even among centaurs, 2005 VD's orbit has visibly changed even since its discovery. Between 1600 and 2400, its semimajor axis will slowly increase from 6.64 to 6.96 AU, its eccentricity slowly increasing from 0.27 to 0.34, and a decreasing inclination from 176.7° to 169.9°. As such, until about 1870, 2005 VD was the most highly inclined known asteroid in the Solar System.
