= 343158 Marsyas =

Near-Earth asteroid

Discovery
- Discovered by: CSS
- Discovery site: Catalina Stn.
- Discovery date: 29 April 2009

Designations
- Pronunciation: /ˈmɑːrsiəs/
- Named after: Marsyas (Greek mythology)
- Alternative designations: 2009 HC_{82}
- Minor planet category: NEO · Apollo; Retrograde

Orbital characteristics
- Epoch 17 December 2020 (JD 2459200.5)
- Uncertainty parameter 0
- Observation arc: 17.17 yr (6,270 d)
- Aphelion: 4.5656 AU
- Perihelion: 0.4886 AU
- Semi-major axis: 2.5271 AU
- Eccentricity: 0.8067
- Orbital period (sidereal): 4.02 yr (1,467 d)
- Mean anomaly: 5.8661°
- Mean motion: 0° 14^{m} 43.08^{s} / day
- Inclination: 154.37°
- Longitude of ascending node: 295.40°
- Argument of perihelion: 298.88°
- Earth MOID: 0.1471 AU (57.2 LD)
- T_{Jupiter}: 1.3160

Physical characteristics
- Mean diameter: 1.7 km (est. at 0.22); 3.5 km (est. at 0.05)
- Apparent magnitude: ~20
- Absolute magnitude (H): 16.27

343158 Marsyas (provisional designation: 2009 HC_{82}) is an asteroid on a retrograde orbit, classified as a large near-Earth object of the Apollo group. It may be an extinct comet or damocloid asteroid. The asteroid was discovered on 29 April 2009, by astronomers with the Catalina Sky Survey at the Catalina Station near Tucson, Arizona, in the United States. Approximately 2 kilometers (1.2 miles) in diameter, it makes many close approaches to Earth, Venus, and Mars at a very high relative velocity. It was named after the satyr Marsyas from Greek mythology.

== Classification and orbit ==
Marsyas was initially listed as a potentially hazardous asteroid. It was removed from the Sentry Risk Table on 6 May 2009. It orbits the Sun at a distance of 0.49–4.6 AU once every 4.02 years (1,467 days; semi-major axis of 2.53 AU). Its orbit has an eccentricity of 0.81 and an inclination of 154° with respect to the ecliptic.

Marsyas has a retrograde orbit and thus orbits the Sun in the opposite direction of other objects. Therefore, close approaches to this object can have very high relative velocities. As of 2012, it had the highest relative velocity to Earth of objects that come within 0.5 AU of Earth.

=== Close approaches ===
On 11 November 2024, Marsyas passed about 0.485 AU (72,600,000 km; 45,100,000 mi) from Earth, but with a record high relative velocity of about 283,000 km/h (78.66 km/s). Both Halley's Comet (254,000 km/h) and 55P/Tempel-Tuttle (252,800 km/h) have slightly lower relative velocities to Earth. Note however that when the asteroid is one astronomical unit from the sun (as it would be if it ever hit Earth), its relative speed will be less. On 2 February 2053, Marsyas will pass about 0.08 AU from Venus. On 22 October 2060, it may pass about 0.004 AU (600,000 km; 370,000 mi) from Mars.

=== Possible damocloid ===
The multiple planet crossing and retrograde orbit suggests that this object may be an extinct comet or damocloid asteroid similar to 5335 Damocles, 2008 KV42, and 20461 Dioretsa.

=== Possible asteroid origin ===
Marsyas has a semimajor axis that puts it very near the 3:1 mean-motion resonance with Jupiter at 2.5 au. This resonance has been shown to be a source for near-Earth asteroids on low-inclination orbits to evolve onto retrograde orbits. Studies show that, when compared to model predictions, Marsyas exhibits orbital behavior very similar to near-Earth asteroids that undergo the transition to retrograde orbits. Its orbital evolution and current location very near the 3:1 resonance strongly suggests that Marsyas thus may likely to be a near-Earth asteroid that evolved onto a retrograde orbit as opposed to being an extinct comet or damocloid asteroid.

=== Diameter ===
Based on a generic magnitude-to-diameter conversion, Marsyas measures approximately 1.7 to 3.5 kilometers in diameter, for an absolute magnitude of 16.2 and an assumed albedo between 0.22 and 0.05. Since the true albedo is unknown and it has an absolute magnitude (H) of 16.1, it is about 1.6 to 3.6 km in diameter.

== Naming ==
On 14 May 2021, the object was named by the Working Group for Small Bodies Nomenclature (WGSBN), after Marsyas, a Phrygian satyr from Greek mythology, who dared to challenge Apollo in a musical contest. Marsyas lost and he was flayed alive in a cave near Celaenae for his hubris to challenge a god. As with the mythological account, the unusual retrograde orbit of asteroid Marsyas is opposed to most bodies in the Solar System, including 1862 Apollo.
