= (144908) 2004 YH32 =

Asteroid

(144908) 2004 YH_{32}
Discovery
- Discovered by: SSS
- Discovery site: Siding Spring Obs.
- Discovery date: 18 December 2004

Designations
- Minor planet category: centaur · damocloid unusual · distant

Orbital characteristics
- Epoch 27 April 2019 (JD 2458600.5)
- Uncertainty parameter 3
- Observation arc: 2.08 yr (758 d)
- Aphelion: 12.777 AU
- Perihelion: 3.5507 AU
- Semi-major axis: 8.1641 AU
- Eccentricity: 0.5651
- Orbital period (sidereal): 23.33 yr (8,520 d)
- Mean anomaly: 212.33°
- Mean motion: 0° 2^{m} 32.28^{s} / day
- Inclination: 78.978°
- Longitude of ascending node: 47.727°
- Argument of perihelion: 348.73°
- T_{Jupiter}: 1.0330

Physical characteristics
- Mean diameter: 12 km
- Geometric albedo: 0.09 (assumed)
- Absolute magnitude (H): 12.9

(144908) 2004 YH_{32} is a centaur and damocloid orbiting the Sun with a very high inclination of almost 80°. It was discovered on 18 December 2004 by the Siding Spring Survey at the Siding Spring Observatory in Australia. The critical and unusual object measures approximately 12 kilometers (7.5 miles) in diameter.

== Orbit and classification ==
It orbits the Sun at a distance of 3.6–12.8 AU once every 23 years and 4 months (8,520 days; semi-major axis of 8.16 AU). Its orbit has an eccentricity of 0.57 and an inclination of 79° with respect to the ecliptic. The body's observation arc begins with its official discovery observation at the Siding Spring Observatory in December 2004.

== Physical characteristics ==
Johnston's Archive assumes a standard albedo of 0.09 and calculates a diameter of 12 kilometers based on an absolute magnitude of 12.9.
