= 2017 MB7 =

Trans-Neptunian object

2017 MB_{7}
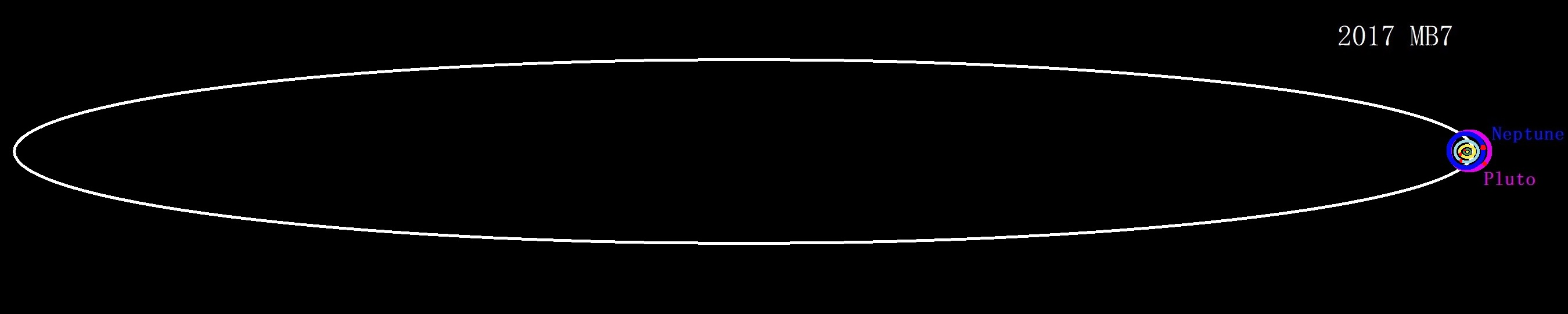
- Highly eccentric orbit of 2017 MB_{7}

Discovery
- Discovered by: Pan-STARRS 1
- Discovery site: Haleakala Obs.
- Discovery date: 22 June 2017 (first observed only)

Designations
- Minor planet category: TNO · damocloid unusual · distant

Orbital characteristics
- Epoch 31 May 2020 (JD 2459000.5)
- Uncertainty parameter 2
- Observation arc: 174 days
- Aphelion: 3,419±89 AU
- Perihelion: 4.458 AU
- Semi-major axis: 1,712±45 AU
- Eccentricity: 0.9974
- Orbital period (sidereal): 70,825±2,767 yr
- Mean anomaly: 0.0181°
- Mean motion: 0° 0^{m} 0.05^{s} / day
- Inclination: 55.724°
- Longitude of ascending node: 58.247°
- Argument of perihelion: 80.627±0.002°
- T_{Jupiter}: 1.477

Physical characteristics
- Mean diameter: 9 km (assumed)
- Geometric albedo: 0.048 (assumed)
- Absolute magnitude (H): 14.156±0.332; 14.2

2017 MB_{7} is a trans-Neptunian object and damocloid on a cometary-like orbit from the outer Solar System, approximately 9 kilometers (6 miles) in diameter. It was first observed on 22 June 2017 by the Pan-STARRS survey at Haleakala Observatory in Hawaii, United States. This unusual object has one of the largest heliocentric aphelions, semi-major axes, orbital eccentricities, and orbital periods of any known periodic minor planet; being comparable, albeit smaller, than that of 2010 LN135 and 2014 FE72; it is calculated to reach several thousand AU (Earth–Sun) distances at the farthest extent of its orbit.

== Orbit and classification ==
2017 MB_{7} orbits the Sun at a distance of 4.5–3,419 AU once every 70,825 years (semi-major axis of 1712 AU). Its orbit has an eccentricity of 0.9974 and an inclination of 56° with respect to the ecliptic.

As it has an eccentricity higher than 0.50, the distant object is labelled an (other) unusual object by the Minor Planet Center. Johnston's Archive groups it to the damocloids, due to its extreme orbital elements and a T_{Jupiter} of less than 2, while in JPL's Small Body Database, it is a trans-Neptunian object with a semi-major axis larger than that of Neptune.

== Physical characteristics ==
Very little is known for certain about the body's physical characteristics. Johnston's Archive assumes a generic damocloid-object albedo of 0.048 and calculates a diameter of 9 kilometers. Like other distant objects, it is probably also fairly red in appearance due to tholins on its surface.

== See also ==
- List of Solar System objects by greatest aphelion
- C/2014 UN271
