= Unusual minor planet =

In planetary science, the term unusual minor planet, or unusual object, is used for a minor planet that possesses an unusual physical or orbital characteristic. For the Minor Planet Center (MPC), which operates under the auspices of the International Astronomical Union, any non-classical main-belt asteroid, which account for the vast majority of all minor planets, is an unusual minor planet. These include the near-Earth objects and trojans as well as the distant minor planets such as centaurs and trans-Neptunian objects. In a narrower sense, the term is used for a group of bodies – including main-belt asteroids, Mars-crossers, centaurs and otherwise non-classifiable minor planets – that show a high orbital eccentricity, typically above 0.5 and/or a perihelion of less than 6 AU. Similarly, an unusual asteroid (UA) is an inner Solar System object with a high eccentricity and/or inclination but with a perihelion larger than 1.3 AU, which does exclude the near-Earth objects.

== Other unusual objects ==
According to the MPC, other unusual minor planets are objects, which orbital characteristics do not fit those of the near-Earth and distant populations. These objects typically have high eccentricities, and inclinations often more than 90 degrees (retrograde orbits), a criterion that is common among the members of the damocloid population. Object in this list have a T_{Jupiter} of less than 3 and a perihelion between 1.67 and 5.5 AU, that is, they do not cross the orbit of Mars but cross or at least come close to Jupiter's orbit at 5.2 AU. According to the SSBN07 classification, such objects have cometary dynamics.

As of October 2026, the number of objects counted by the MPC as unusual minor planets are as follows:

Category	Number of Unusual Minor Planets	Notes
Atens	3545	Defined as having semimajor axes less than 1.0 AU
Apollos	22043	Defined as having perihelion distances less than 1.0 AU
Amors	17229	Defined as having perihelion distances between 1.0 and 1.3 AU
Centaurs and Scattered-Disk Objects	2226	Defined as having perihelia beyond the orbit of Jupiter and semimajor axes inside the orbit of Neptune
Transneptunians	4107	Defined as having orbits with semimajor axes beyond the orbit of Neptune.
Others	679	Otherwise uncategorized by MPC

Additional Trojans including 385571 Otrera and 385695 Clete did not appear in the close-approacher lists. As of October 2026, there are additionally 1 Earth Trojan, 9 Mars Trojans, 34 Neptune Trojans (one Neptune Trojan did appear in the close-approacher lists) and 15765 Jupiter Trojans.

Most objects remain unnumbered. An incomplete list of some unusual minor planets follows. A bold designation links to an object's stand-alone article.

Designation	Discovery			D est.	Orbital description							Remarks	Refs
Designation	Year	Place	Discoverer	D est.	LoMP class	a (AU)	e	i (°)	q (AU)	Q (AU)	T_{Jupiter}	Remarks	Refs
(15504) 1999 RG33	1999	(703)	CSS	17 km	CEN	9.4	0.77	35	2.12	16.6	1.95	Listed in damocloid Obs: 4 opposition(s); Johnston's Archive: damocloid; BR-mag: 1.21	MPC; JPL
20461 Dioretsa	1999	(704)	LINEAR	7.7 km	CEN	23.9	0.90	160	2.40	45.4	-1.54	Listed in damocloid Obs: 4 opposition(s); Johnston's Archive: damocloid; albedo: 0.030	catalog MPC; JPL
37117 Narcissus	2000	(919)	W. K. Y. Yeung	9.7 km	CEN	6.9	0.55	14	3.07	10.7	2.62	Obs: 10 opposition(s); Johnston's Archive: unusual; albedo: 0.088	MPC; JPL
(65407) 2002 RP120	2002	(699)	LONEOS	15 km	TNO	53.9	0.95	119	2.45	105	-0.84	Listed in damocloid Obs: 4 opposition(s); Johnston's Archive: damocloid; albedo: 0.098; BR-mag: 1.37	catalog MPC; JPL
(144908) 2004 YH32	2004	(E12)	SSS	12 km	CEN	8.2	0.57	79	3.55	12.8	1.03	Obs: 3 opposition(s); Johnston's Archive: damocloid;	catalog MPC; JPL
(145627) 2006 RY102	2006	(644)	NEAT	27 km	CEN	6.3	0.28	19	4.58	8.1	2.83	Obs: 19 opposition(s); Johnston's Archive: unusual; albedo: 0.051	MPC; JPL
(154783) 2004 PA44	2004	(644)	NEAT	8.4 km	CEN	14.2	0.76	3	3.41	25.0	2.51	Listed in damocloid Obs: 4 opposition(s); Johnston's Archive: damocloid;	MPC; JPL
(308607) 2005 WY3	2005	(291)	Spacewatch	8.8 km	CEN	6.7	0.73	29	1.79	11.7	2.12	Obs: 4 opposition(s); Johnston's Archive: unusual;	MPC; JPL
(330759) 2008 SO218	2008	(G96)	MLS	12 km	CEN	8.1	0.56	170	3.54	12.7	-1.39	Listed in damocloid Obs: 8 opposition(s); Johnston's Archive: damocloid; albedo: 0.076; BR-mag: 1.44	MPC; JPL
(347449) 2012 TW236	1998	(704)	LINEAR	15 km	CEN	7.0	0.57	12	3.00	11.0	2.61	Obs: 9 opposition(s); Johnston's Archive: unusual;	MPC; JPL
(433873) 2015 BQ311	2006	(G96)	MLS	16 km	CEN	7.1	0.29	25	5.03	9.2	2.77	Obs: 13 opposition(s); Johnston's Archive: centaur; BR-mag: 1.25	MPC; JPL
(434620) 2005 VD	2005	(G96)	MLS	6.3 km	CEN	6.7	0.25	173	5.00	8.3	-1.39	Listed in damocloid Obs: 6 opposition(s); Johnston's Archive: damocloid; BR-mag: 1.05	catalog MPC; JPL
(540205) 2017 RS17	2016	(F51)	Pan-STARRS 1	5.4 km	CEN	6.2	0.45	43	3.41	8.9	2.27	Obs: 5 opposition(s); Johnston's Archive: unusual;	MPC; JPL
1996 PW	1996	(566)	NEAT	7.4 km	TNO	253	0.99	30	2.49	504	1.73	Listed in damocloid Obs: 2 opposition(s); Johnston's Archive: damocloid;	MPC; JPL
1998 QJ_{1}	1998	(704)	LINEAR	2.2 km	CEN	11.2	0.81	24	2.09	20.4	2.03	Listed in damocloid Obs: ( 62d); Johnston's Archive: damocloid;	MPC; JPL
2000 AB_{229}	2000	(704)	LINEAR	7.0 km	TNO	52.9	0.96	68	2.32	103	0.79	Listed in damocloid Obs: ( 64d); Johnston's Archive: damocloid;	MPC; JPL
2000 DG8	2000	(704)	LINEAR	11 km	CEN	10.8	0.79	129	2.22	19.3	-0.62	Listed in damocloid Obs: 2 opposition(s); Johnston's Archive: damocloid; albedo: 0.053	MPC; JPL
2000 HE_{46}	2000	(699)	LONEOS	4.9 km	CEN	23.6	0.90	159	2.39	44.9	-1.52	Listed in damocloid Obs: 2 opposition(s); Johnston's Archive: damocloid; albedo: 0.045; BR-mag: 1.42	MPC; JPL
2000 KP_{65}	2000	(699)	LONEOS	35 km	TNO	90.2	0.96	46	3.31	177	1.63	Listed in damocloid Obs: ( 58d); Johnston's Archive: damocloid;	MPC; JPL
(612223) 2001 QF_{6}	2001	(704)	LINEAR	4.0 km	CEN	7.3	0.69	24	2.27	12.3	2.28	Obs: 4 opposition(s); Johnston's Archive: unusual; albedo: 0.040	MPC; JPL
2001 YK_{61}	2001	(704)	LINEAR	8.1 km	CEN	10.6	0.69	12	3.29	17.9	2.51	Obs: ( 61d); Johnston's Archive: unusual;	MPC; JPL
2002 AR_{91}	2002	(807)	DLS	2.9 km	TNO	75.2	0.97	18	2.62	148	1.97	Listed in damocloid Obs: ( 4d)	MPC; JPL
2002 RN109	2002	(704)	LINEAR	3.9 km	TNO	555	1.00	58	2.69	1107	1.10	Listed in damocloid Obs: ( 80d); Johnston's Archive: damocloid;	MPC; JPL
2003 CC_{22}	2003	(568)	D. C. Jewitt; S. S. Sheppard	13 km	CEN	7.3	0.43	6	4.17	10.4	2.84	Obs: 2 opposition(s); Johnston's Archive: unusual;	MPC; JPL
2003 WN_{188}	2003	(703)	CSS	7.0 km	CEN	14.4	0.85	27	2.21	26.6	1.94	Listed in damocloid Obs: 2 opposition(s); Johnston's Archive: damocloid; albedo: 0.050; BR-mag: 1.26	MPC; JPL
(661238) 2004 DA62	2004	(704)	LINEAR	11 km	CEN	7.7	0.47	52	4.09	11.2	1.99	Obs: 3 opposition(s); Johnston's Archive: damocloid; BR-mag: 1.37	MPC; JPL
2004 NN_{8}	2004	(E12)	SSS	3.9 km	TNO	98.4	0.98	166	2.36	194	-1.78	Listed in damocloid Obs: 2 opposition(s); Johnston's Archive: damocloid;	MPC; JPL
2005 HL_{3}	2005	(E12)	SSS	5.8 km	CEN	11.3	0.83	36	1.89	20.7	1.79	Listed in damocloid Obs: (157d); Johnston's Archive: damocloid;	MPC; JPL
2005 OE	2005	(703)	CSS	8.1 km	TNO	62.9	0.95	68	3.03	123	0.90	Listed in damocloid Obs: 2 opposition(s); Johnston's Archive: damocloid;	MPC; JPL
2005 SB_{223}	2005	(E12)	SSS	6.4 km	CEN	29.4	0.91	91	2.78	56.1	0.13	Listed in damocloid Obs: (244d); Johnston's Archive: damocloid;	MPC; JPL
2005 TJ_{50}	2005	(691)	Spacewatch	3.9 km	CEN	9.1	0.58	110	3.81	14.5	-0.17	Listed in damocloid Obs: ( 62d); Johnston's Archive: damocloid;	MPC; JPL
2005 VX3	2005	(G96)	MLS	6.7 km	TNO	953	1.00	112	4.11	1902	-0.91	Listed in damocloid Obs: ( 81d); Johnston's Archive: damocloid;	MPC; JPL
2006 BZ8	2006	(703)	CSS	6.4 km	CEN	9.6	0.80	165	1.89	17.3	-1.02	Listed in damocloid Obs: 3 opposition(s); Johnston's Archive: damocloid;	MPC; JPL
2006 EX_{52}	2006	(703)	CSS	5.3 km	TNO	42.5	0.94	150	2.56	82.5	-1.57	Listed in damocloid Obs: 2 opposition(s); Johnston's Archive: damocloid;	MPC; JPL
2006 FV_{4}	2006	(704)	LINEAR	11 km	CEN	10.8	0.70	32	3.23	18.3	2.22	Obs: 4 opposition(s); Johnston's Archive: unusual;	MPC; JPL
2006 JG_{57}	2006	(644)	NEAT	15 km	CEN	9.6	0.51	57	4.73	14.5	1.82	Obs: 3 opposition(s); Johnston's Archive: damocloid;	MPC; JPL
2006 RG_{1}	2006	(E12)	SSS	3.4 km	CEN	25.6	0.92	134	2.03	49.2	-0.99	Listed in damocloid Obs: 2 opposition(s); Johnston's Archive: damocloid;	MPC; JPL
2006 RJ2	2006	(703)	CSS	2.9 km	CEN	9.8	0.76	165	2.31	17.3	-1.17	Listed in damocloid Obs: ( 37d); Johnston's Archive: damocloid;	MPC; JPL
2006 SO_{134}	2006	(691)	Spacewatch	2.3 km	CEN	19.5	0.83	4	3.30	35.7	2.42	Listed in damocloid Obs: ( 36d); Johnston's Archive: damocloid;	MPC; JPL
2007 DA_{61}	2007	(G96)	MLS	4.6 km	TNO	447	0.99	77	2.66	890	0.48	Listed in damocloid Obs: 2 opposition(s); Johnston's Archive: damocloid;	MPC; JPL
(613717) 2007 DP_{50}	2007	(691)	Spacewatch	5.3 km	CEN	6.2	0.38	3	3.83	8.6	2.85	Obs: 3 opposition(s); Johnston's Archive: unusual;	MPC; JPL
2007 HU_{45}	2007	(G96)	MLS	3.1 km	CEN	6.8	0.50	6	3.39	10.2	2.73	Obs: ( 28d); Johnston's Archive: unusual;	MPC; JPL
2007 SA_{24}	2007	(G96)	MLS	4.2 km	CEN	6.3	0.57	17	2.72	9.9	2.56	Obs: (156d); Johnston's Archive: unusual;	MPC; JPL
2008 BN_{18}	2008	(291)	Spacewatch	7.7 km	TNO	35.3	0.93	29	2.64	67.9	1.88	Listed in damocloid Obs: ( 14d); Johnston's Archive: damocloid;	MPC; JPL
2008 JS_{14}	2008	(E12)	SSS	10 km	CEN	11.6	0.74	26	2.97	20.1	2.24	Obs: 2 opposition(s); Johnston's Archive: unusual; albedo: 0.044	MPC; JPL
2008 SE_{82}	2008	(G96)	MLS	4.9 km	CEN	19.3	0.84	17	3.18	35.4	2.29	Listed in damocloid Obs: ( 61d); Johnston's Archive: damocloid;	MPC; JPL
2008 WA_{95}	2008	(704)	LINEAR	1.9 km	CEN	14.1	0.88	60	1.72	26.4	1.16	Listed in damocloid Obs: ( 27d); Johnston's Archive: damocloid;	MPC; JPL
2008 WT_{11}	2008	(703)	CSS	7.0 km	CEN	9.9	0.62	7	3.78	16.0	2.68	Obs: ( 38d); Johnston's Archive: unusual;	MPC; JPL
2009 AU_{16}	2009	(E12)	SSS	2.7 km	CEN	23.6	0.92	70	1.95	45.3	0.81	Listed in damocloid Obs: (125d); Johnston's Archive: damocloid;	MPC; JPL
2009 BL_{80}	2009	(704)	LINEAR	2.4 km	CEN	6.1	0.64	9	2.20	10.1	2.49	Obs: (119d); Johnston's Archive: unusual;	MPC; JPL
2009 FW_{23}	2009	(E12)	SSS	3.7 km	CEN	11.5	0.86	87	1.67	21.4	0.54	Listed in damocloid Obs: ( 55d); Johnston's Archive: damocloid;	MPC; JPL
2009 QY_{6}	2009	(704)	LINEAR	4.9 km	CEN	12.5	0.83	138	2.07	22.9	-0.85	Listed in damocloid Obs: 2 opposition(s); Johnston's Archive: damocloid; albedo: 0.015	MPC; JPL
2010 CG_{55}	2010	(703)	CSS	6.4 km	TNO	32.0	0.91	146	2.88	61.1	-1.55	Listed in damocloid Obs: 3 opposition(s); Johnston's Archive: damocloid; albedo: 0.048	MPC; JPL
2010 DC_{39}	2010	(G96)	MLS	1.7 km	TNO	109	0.98	11	1.83	216	1.70	Listed in damocloid Obs: ( 2d)	MPC; JPL
2010 EE_{21}	2010	(C51)	WISE	2.7 km	CEN	8.5	0.62	36	3.20	13.7	2.23	Obs: ( 19d); Johnston's Archive: unusual;	MPC; JPL
2010 EX_{175}	2010	(C51)	WISE	0 m	TNO	49.4	0.95	29	2.65	96.1	1.85	Listed in damocloid Obs: ( 1d)	MPC; JPL
2010 GW_{64}	2010	(C51)	WISE	4.6 km	TNO	63.3	0.94	105	3.72	123	-0.54	Listed in damocloid Obs: 2 opposition(s); Johnston's Archive: damocloid; albedo: 0.047	MPC; JPL
2010 GW_{147}	2010	(C51)	WISE	10 km	TNO	167	0.97	100	5.39	330	-0.45	Listed in damocloid Obs: 3 opposition(s); Johnston's Archive: centaur; albedo: 0.037	MPC; JPL
2010 JB_{184}	2010	(C51)	WISE	0 m	TNO	44.8	0.93	19	3.07	86.6	2.13	Listed in damocloid Obs: ( 1d)	MPC; JPL
2010 JC_{147}	2010	(C51)	WISE	5.1 km	CEN	14.6	0.76	42	3.47	25.8	1.97	Listed in damocloid Obs: (123d); Johnston's Archive: damocloid; albedo: 0.064	MPC; JPL
2010 JH_{124}	2010	(C51)	WISE	5.3 km	TNO	69.1	0.96	53	2.60	136	1.26	Listed in damocloid Obs: 2 opposition(s); Johnston's Archive: damocloid; albedo: 0.052	MPC; JPL
2010 LN_{135}	2010	(I41)	PTF	7.8 km	TNO	2169	1.00	65	1.72	4337	0.78	Listed in damocloid Obs: ( 32d)	MPC; JPL
2010 OM_{101}	2010	(C51)	WISE	1.8 km	CEN	26.0	0.92	119	2.13	50.0	-0.66	Listed in damocloid Obs: (101d); Johnston's Archive: damocloid; albedo: 0.036; BR-mag: 1.34	MPC; JPL
2010 OR_{1}	2010	(C51)	WISE	2.5 km	CEN	26.9	0.92	144	2.04	51.8	-1.21	Listed in damocloid Obs: 2 opposition(s); Johnston's Archive: damocloid; albedo: 0.110; BR-mag: 1.32	MPC; JPL
2010 PO_{58}	2010	(C51)	WISE	5.6 km	CEN	11.8	0.75	121	2.93	20.6	-0.59	Listed in damocloid Obs: ( 6d); Johnston's Archive: damocloid; albedo: 0.035	MPC; JPL
2011 OR_{17}	2011	(E12)	SSS	11 km	TNO	268	0.99	111	3.11	532	-0.76	Listed in damocloid Obs: 3 opposition(s); Johnston's Archive: damocloid;	MPC; JPL
2011 RC_{17}	2011	(H15)	ISON-NM	3.1 km	CEN	6.3	0.54	11	2.92	9.7	2.65	Obs: 3 opposition(s); Johnston's Archive: unusual;	MPC; JPL
2011 SP_{25}	2011	(F51)	Pan-STARRS 1	2.0 km	CEN	19.5	0.88	109	2.27	36.8	-0.33	Listed in damocloid Obs: ( 58d); Johnston's Archive: damocloid;	MPC; JPL
2011 SQ_{249}	2011	(F51)	Pan-STARRS 1	5.8 km	CEN	6.6	0.45	17	3.61	9.6	2.71	Obs: 3 opposition(s); Johnston's Archive: unusual; albedo: 0.054	MPC; JPL
2011 UR_{402}	2011	(F51)	Pan-STARRS 1	20 km	CEN	18.7	0.78	25	4.12	33.2	2.44	Listed in damocloid Obs: 7 opposition(s); Johnston's Archive: damocloid;	MPC; JPL
2011 WS_{41}	2011	(F51)	Pan-STARRS 1	1.4 km	TNO	37.8	0.95	142	2.07	73.5	-1.24	Listed in damocloid Obs: ( 20d); Johnston's Archive: damocloid;	MPC; JPL
2011 YU_{75}	2011	(691)	Spacewatch	1.8 km	CEN	7.5	0.77	17	1.76	13.3	2.17	Obs: (121d); Johnston's Archive: unusual;	MPC; JPL
2012 CN_{29}	2012	(G96)	MLS	4.9 km	CEN	6.4	0.31	20	4.43	8.4	2.79	Obs: ( 67d)	MPC; JPL
2012 DD_{61}	2012	(703)	CSS	9.7 km	CEN	7.5	0.50	19	3.77	11.2	2.67	Obs: 3 opposition(s); Johnston's Archive: unusual;	MPC; JPL
2012 HD_{2}	2012	(691)	Spacewatch	3.9 km	TNO	62.8	0.96	147	2.56	123	-1.57	Listed in damocloid Obs: 2 opposition(s); Johnston's Archive: damocloid;	MPC; JPL
2012 KA_{51}	2012	(I41)	PTF	14 km	TNO	493	0.99	71	4.90	982	0.91	Listed in damocloid Obs: 2 opposition(s); Johnston's Archive: damocloid;	MPC; JPL
2012 UN_{138}	2012	(F51)	Pan-STARRS 1	3.5 km	CEN	10.0	0.66	16	3.45	16.6	2.53	Obs: ( 31d); Johnston's Archive: unusual;	MPC; JPL
2012 YE_{8}	2012	(G96)	MLS	4.2 km	CEN	9.3	0.59	136	3.83	14.8	-0.99	Listed in damocloid Obs: ( 78d); Johnston's Archive: damocloid;	MPC; JPL
2012 YO_{6}	2012	(F51)	Pan-STARRS 1	5.1 km	CEN	6.3	0.48	107	3.30	9.3	0.26	Listed in damocloid Obs: (142d); Johnston's Archive: damocloid; BR-mag: 1.32	MPC; JPL
2013 CM_{77}	2013	(703)	CSS	2.8 km	CEN	7.4	0.59	9	2.99	11.8	2.60	Obs: 2 opposition(s); Johnston's Archive: unusual;	MPC; JPL
2013 GY_{54}	2013	(F51)	Pan-STARRS 1	6.1 km	CEN	13.6	0.66	8	4.61	22.6	2.78	Obs: 2 opposition(s); Johnston's Archive: unusual;	MPC; JPL
2013 HS_{150}	2013	(W84)	DECam-NEO	1.9 km	TNO	62.8	0.96	97	2.82	123	-0.18	Listed in damocloid Obs: ( 23d); Johnston's Archive: damocloid;	MPC; JPL
2013 LD_{16}	2013	(G96)	MLS	2.7 km	TNO	81.0	0.97	155	2.55	159	-1.73	Listed in damocloid Obs: 2 opposition(s); Johnston's Archive: damocloid; BR-mag: 1.30	MPC; JPL
2013 LG_{29}	2013	(F51)	Pan-STARRS 1	4.6 km	CEN	17.0	0.79	15	3.55	30.4	2.44	Listed in damocloid Obs: 2 opposition(s); Johnston's Archive: damocloid;	MPC; JPL
2013 NS_{11}	2013	(F51)	Pan-STARRS 1	8.4 km	CEN	12.6	0.79	130	2.69	22.6	-0.83	Listed in damocloid Obs: 3 opposition(s); Johnston's Archive: damocloid; albedo: 0.030; BR-mag: 1.30	MPC; JPL
2013 PJ_{44}	2013	(F51)	Pan-STARRS 1	5.6 km	CEN	12.1	0.68	22	3.91	20.3	2.52	Obs: ( 32d); Johnston's Archive: unusual;	MPC; JPL
2013 SV_{99}	2013	(W84)	DECam	2.2 km	CEN	6.9	0.26	17	5.12	8.7	2.88	Obs: ( 16d); Johnston's Archive: centaur;	MPC; JPL
2013 WK_{64}	2013	(F51)	Pan-STARRS 1	3.4 km	CEN	7.9	0.63	63	2.95	12.9	1.54	Obs: (118d); Johnston's Archive: damocloid;	MPC; JPL
2013 YF_{48}	2013	(G96)	MLS	7.0 km	CEN	9.3	0.52	78	4.43	14.1	1.05	Obs: ( 94d); Johnston's Archive: damocloid;	MPC; JPL
2013 YG_{48}	2013	(703)	CSS	1.6 km	CEN	8.2	0.75	61	2.03	14.3	1.43	Listed in damocloid Obs: (110d); Johnston's Archive: damocloid; BR-mag: 1.32	MPC; JPL
2014 EY_{247}	2014	(W84)	DECam	4.4 km	CEN	6.1	0.28	6	4.36	7.8	2.92	Obs: 2 opposition(s); Johnston's Archive: unusual;	MPC; JPL
2014 JJ_{57}	2014	(F51)	Pan-STARRS 1	13 km	CEN	7.0	0.29	96	4.94	9.0	0.52	Listed in damocloid Obs: 4 opposition(s); Johnston's Archive: damocloid;	MPC; JPL
2014 KM_{122}	2014	(F51)	Pan-STARRS 1	7.0 km	CEN	6.3	0.43	28	3.59	8.9	2.59	Obs: 3 opposition(s); Johnston's Archive: unusual;	MPC; JPL
2014 MH_{55}	2014	(F51)	Pan-STARRS 1	8.4 km	TNO	44.8	0.90	92	4.50	85.1	0.01	Listed in damocloid Obs: 2 opposition(s); Johnston's Archive: damocloid;	MPC; JPL
2014 ON_{57}	2014	(F51)	Pan-STARRS 1	8.8 km	CEN	15.3	0.69	10	4.78	25.7	2.79	Obs: 4 opposition(s); Johnston's Archive: unusual;	MPC; JPL
2014 RE_{12}	2014	(F51)	Pan-STARRS 1	15 km	CEN	14.2	0.64	32	5.08	23.4	2.52	Obs: 8 opposition(s); Johnston's Archive: centaur;	MPC; JPL
2014 SQ_{339}	2014	(F51)	Pan-STARRS 1	1.5 km	CEN	27.9	0.90	129	2.78	53.1	-1.07	Listed in damocloid Obs: ( 30d); Johnston's Archive: damocloid;	MPC; JPL
2014 SQ_{369}	2014	(F51)	Pan-STARRS 1	1.5 km	CEN	6.0	0.67	12	2.01	10.1	2.43	Obs: (134d); Johnston's Archive: unusual;	MPC; JPL
2014 TK_{34}	2014	(F51)	Pan-STARRS 1	5.8 km	CEN	13.9	0.70	13	4.14	23.6	2.64	Obs: 3 opposition(s); Johnston's Archive: unusual;	MPC; JPL
2014 UV_{114}	2014	(G96)	MLS	3.1 km	CEN	13.0	0.69	171	4.02	22.0	-1.86	Listed in damocloid Obs: ( 41d); Johnston's Archive: damocloid;	MPC; JPL
2014 XS_{3}	2014	(F51)	Pan-STARRS 1	4.6 km	TNO	73.6	0.96	101	3.25	144	-0.37	Listed in damocloid Obs: 3 opposition(s); Johnston's Archive: damocloid;	MPC; JPL
2015 AO_{44}	2015	(703)	CSS	8.4 km	CEN	22.0	0.84	140	3.62	40.5	-1.49	Listed in damocloid Obs: 3 opposition(s); Johnston's Archive: damocloid;	MPC; JPL
2015 BH_{311}	2015	(G96)	MLS	3.4 km	CEN	9.2	0.73	94	2.46	15.8	0.44	Listed in damocloid Obs: ( 3d); Johnston's Archive: damocloid;	MPC; JPL
2015 BW_{524}	2015	(568)	Mauna Kea Obs.	6.1 km	CEN	6.9	0.31	9	4.76	9.0	2.92	Obs: 3 opposition(s); Johnston's Archive: unusual;	MPC; JPL
2015 BX_{514}	2015	(F51)	Pan-STARRS 1	5.1 km	CEN	12.2	0.62	5	4.59	19.8	2.81	Obs: 3 opposition(s); Johnston's Archive: unusual;	MPC; JPL
2015 DB_{198}	2015	(F51)	Pan-STARRS 1	9.7 km	CEN	8.3	0.42	22	4.75	11.7	2.75	Obs: 4 opposition(s); Johnston's Archive: unusual;	MPC; JPL
2015 FK_{37}	2015	(F51)	Pan-STARRS 1	5.6 km	TNO	441	0.99	156	4.96	877	-2.48	Listed in damocloid Obs: 3 opposition(s); Johnston's Archive: damocloid;	MPC; JPL
2015 JH_{1}	2015	(F51)	Pan-STARRS 1	9.3 km	CEN	12.3	0.71	35	3.58	21.0	2.19	Obs: 4 opposition(s); Johnston's Archive: unusual;	MPC; JPL
2015 KJ_{153}	2015	(F52)	Pan-STARRS 2	3.1 km	CEN	6.4	0.58	18	2.68	10.0	2.54	Obs: 2 opposition(s); Johnston's Archive: unusual;	MPC; JPL
2015 RE_{277}	2015	(568)	OSSOS	2.2 km	CEN	20.3	0.77	2	4.77	35.8	2.80	Listed in damocloid Obs: 2 opposition(s); Johnston's Archive: damocloid;	MPC; JPL
2015 RK_{245}	2015	(703)	CSS	5.6 km	TNO	80.6	0.97	92	2.76	158	0.01	Listed in damocloid Obs: 2 opposition(s); Johnston's Archive: damocloid;	MPC; JPL
2015 RL_{277}	2015	(568)	OSSOS	2.3 km	TNO	34.4	0.85	3	5.19	63.7	2.87	Listed in damocloid Obs: 2 opposition(s); Johnston's Archive: centaur;	MPC; JPL
2015 TN_{178}	2015	(F51)	Pan-STARRS 1	3.9 km	TNO	54.6	0.96	91	2.38	107	0.06	Listed in damocloid Obs: 2 opposition(s); Johnston's Archive: damocloid;	MPC; JPL
2015 TS_{350}	2015	(F51)	Pan-STARRS 1	10 km	TNO	141	0.96	58	5.05	276	1.50	Listed in damocloid Obs: 3 opposition(s); Johnston's Archive: centaur;	MPC; JPL
2015 XQ_{384}	2015	(F51)	Pan-STARRS 1	2.9 km	CEN	12.7	0.65	22	4.47	20.9	2.62	Obs: ( 31d); Johnston's Archive: unusual;	MPC; JPL
2015 XR_{384}	2015	(F51)	Pan-STARRS 1	2.7 km	TNO	36.9	0.90	158	3.57	70.3	-1.97	Listed in damocloid Obs: (124d); Johnston's Archive: damocloid;	MPC; JPL
2015 XX_{351}	2015	(F51)	Pan-STARRS 1	2.9 km	CEN	14.6	0.85	159	2.13	27.0	-1.27	Listed in damocloid Obs: 2 opposition(s); Johnston's Archive: damocloid;	MPC; JPL
2015 YY_{18}	2015	(F51)	Pan-STARRS 1	4.6 km	CEN	19.5	0.83	118	3.29	35.6	-0.75	Listed in damocloid Obs: 2 opposition(s); Johnston's Archive: damocloid;	MPC; JPL
2016 AC_{282}	2016	(G96)	MLS	3.1 km	CEN	6.1	0.43	26	3.52	8.8	2.61	Obs: ( 61d); Johnston's Archive: unusual;	MPC; JPL
2016 AT_{281}	2016	(F51)	Pan-STARRS 1	4.2 km	TNO	63.4	0.96	22	2.68	124	1.94	Listed in damocloid Obs: (134d); Johnston's Archive: damocloid;	MPC; JPL
2016 BJ_{81}	2016	(G96)	MLS	8.8 km	CEN	9.7	0.48	13	4.99	14.3	2.86	Obs: 5 opposition(s); Johnston's Archive: unusual;	MPC; JPL
2016 CO_{264}	2016	(F51)	Pan-STARRS 1	2.5 km	TNO	48.4	0.94	130	3.02	93.7	-1.25	Listed in damocloid Obs: 2 opposition(s); Johnston's Archive: damocloid;	MPC; JPL
2016 DF_{2}	2016	(F51)	Pan-STARRS 1	1.8 km	CEN	6.2	0.47	167	3.29	9.2	-1.04	Listed in damocloid Obs: ( 2d); Johnston's Archive: damocloid;	MPC; JPL
2016 EJ_{203}	2016	(G96)	MLS	1.1 km	TNO	67.8	0.96	171	2.74	133	-1.92	Listed in damocloid Obs: 2 opposition(s); Johnston's Archive: damocloid;	MPC; JPL
2016 KX_{4}	2016	(F51)	Pan-STARRS 1	4.9 km	CEN	7.0	0.68	38	2.28	11.8	2.10	Obs: 2 opposition(s); Johnston's Archive: unusual;	MPC; JPL
2016 LS	2016	(F51)	Pan-STARRS 1	9.7 km	CEN	13.3	0.61	114	5.24	21.4	-0.66	Listed in damocloid Obs: 2 opposition(s); Johnston's Archive: centaur;	MPC; JPL
2016 ND_{21}	2016	(T05)	ATLAS-HKO	15 km	CEN	8.5	0.56	22	3.76	13.2	2.59	Obs: 7 opposition(s); Johnston's Archive: unusual;	MPC; JPL
2016 NL_{100}	2016	(F51)	Pan-STARRS 1	2.4 km	CEN	13.9	0.76	22	3.33	24.4	2.34	Listed in damocloid Obs: ( 65d); Johnston's Archive: damocloid;	MPC; JPL
2016 PN_{66}	2016	(106)	Črni Vrh Obs.	9.3 km	TNO	31.0	0.91	105	2.90	59.1	-0.37	Listed in damocloid Obs: 2 opposition(s); Johnston's Archive: damocloid;	MPC; JPL
2016 TK_{2}	2016	(F51)	Pan-STARRS 1	4.6 km	CEN	9.2	0.55	92	4.12	14.2	0.48	Listed in damocloid Obs: (135d); Johnston's Archive: damocloid;	MPC; JPL
2016 TP_{93}	2016	(F51)	Pan-STARRS 1	3.2 km	CEN	7.4	0.56	138	3.29	11.5	-0.78	Listed in damocloid Obs: 3 opposition(s); Johnston's Archive: damocloid;	MPC; JPL
2016 TT_{100}	2016	(691)	Spacewatch	4.4 km	CEN	8.9	0.59	10	3.67	14.2	2.67	Obs: 4 opposition(s); Johnston's Archive: unusual;	MPC; JPL
2016 VY_{17}	2016	(G96)	MLS	3.2 km	CEN	11.2	0.85	148	1.67	20.7	-0.85	Listed in damocloid Obs: 4 opposition(s); Johnston's Archive: damocloid;	MPC; JPL
2016 WS_{1}	2016	(C51)	WISE	1.5 km	CEN	14.4	0.88	53	1.70	27.2	1.31	Listed in damocloid Obs: ( 53d); Johnston's Archive: damocloid;	MPC; JPL
2017 AO_{19}	2017	(G96)	MLS	1.3 km	CEN	6.6	0.69	24	2.04	11.3	2.28	Obs: (135d); Johnston's Archive: unusual;	MPC; JPL
2017 AX_{13}	2017	(F51)	Pan-STARRS 1	4.2 km	CEN	28.6	0.88	137	3.35	53.9	-1.43	Listed in damocloid Obs: 4 opposition(s); Johnston's Archive: damocloid;	MPC; JPL
2017 BA_{94}	2017	(F51)	Pan-STARRS 1	1.5 km	CEN	6.5	0.65	19	2.29	10.7	2.41	Obs: ( 31d); Johnston's Archive: unusual;	MPC; JPL
2017 CW_{32}	2017	(G96)	MLS	3.4 km	TNO	193	0.99	152	2.96	382	-1.83	Listed in damocloid Obs: 3 opposition(s); Johnston's Archive: damocloid;	MPC; JPL
2017 FM_{99}	2017	(F51)	Pan-STARRS 1	3.4 km	CEN	8.2	0.66	20	2.78	13.7	2.41	Obs: (106d); Johnston's Archive: unusual;	MPC; JPL
2017 GC_{8}	2017	(F51)	Pan-STARRS 1	1.1 km	CEN	10.3	0.74	7	2.64	18.0	2.37	Obs: ( 31d); Johnston's Archive: unusual;	MPC; JPL
2017 GD_{8}	2017	(F51)	Pan-STARRS 1	1.4 km	TNO	43.5	0.95	75	2.28	84.7	0.60	Listed in damocloid Obs: ( 62d); Johnston's Archive: damocloid;	MPC; JPL
2017 GZ_{8}	2017	(G96)	MLS	5.8 km	CEN	7.6	0.48	6	3.96	11.2	2.80	Obs: 3 opposition(s); Johnston's Archive: unusual;	MPC; JPL
2017 JB_{6}	2017	(F51)	Pan-STARRS 1	4.0 km	TNO	32.9	0.88	161	3.82	62.0	-2.06	Listed in damocloid Obs: (116d); Johnston's Archive: damocloid;	MPC; JPL
2017 MB7	2017	(F51)	Pan-STARRS 1	6.4 km	TNO	3549	1.00	56	4.45	7094	1.32	Listed in damocloid Obs: (174d); Johnston's Archive: damocloid;	MPC; JPL
2017 MZ_{4}	2017	(F51)	Pan-STARRS 1	9.7 km	TNO	66.4	0.95	66	3.18	130	0.97	Listed in damocloid Obs: 2 opposition(s); Johnston's Archive: damocloid;	MPC; JPL
2017 OX_{68}	2017	(F51)	Pan-STARRS 1	1.2 km	TNO	59.0	0.97	95	1.74	116	-0.04	Listed in damocloid Obs: 2 opposition(s); Johnston's Archive: damocloid;	MPC; JPL
(606187) 2017 QO_{33}	2017	(F51)	Pan-STARRS 1	8.1 km	TNO	34.4	0.86	149	4.94	63.9	-2.12	Listed in damocloid Obs: 4 opposition(s); Johnston's Archive: damocloid;	MPC; JPL
2017 RR_{2}	2017	(F51)	Pan-STARRS 1	1.5 km	CEN	11.6	0.78	87	2.53	20.7	0.54	Listed in damocloid Obs: ( 96d); Johnston's Archive: damocloid;	MPC; JPL
2017 SN_{33}	2017	(F51)	Pan-STARRS 1	1.2 km	TNO	249	0.99	152	1.84	497	-1.42	Listed in damocloid Obs: ( 67d); Johnston's Archive: damocloid;	MPC; JPL
2017 SV13	2017	(F51)	Pan-STARRS 1	1.0 km	CEN	9.6	0.79	113	2.01	17.3	-0.12	Listed in damocloid Obs: ( 42d); Johnston's Archive: damocloid;	MPC; JPL
2017 SW_{11}	2017	(F51)	Pan-STARRS 1	12 km	CEN	9.8	0.52	16	4.70	14.8	2.78	Obs: 4 opposition(s); Johnston's Archive: unusual;	MPC; JPL
2017 UW_{51}	2017	(G96)	MLS	3.9 km	TNO	130	0.98	144	3.14	257	-1.73	Listed in damocloid Obs: 2 opposition(s); Johnston's Archive: damocloid;	MPC; JPL
2017 YL_{2}	2017	(C51)	WISE	2.4 km	CEN	9.0	0.77	28	2.09	15.9	2.07	Listed in damocloid Obs: (114d); Johnston's Archive: damocloid;	MPC; JPL
2017 YL_{4}	2017	(F51)	Pan-STARRS 1	5.1 km	TNO	153	0.97	89	4.26	303	0.08	Listed in damocloid Obs: ( 63d)	MPC; JPL
2018 DE_{4}	2018	(G96)	MLS	1.6 km	TNO	32.5	0.93	81	2.39	62.6	0.44	Listed in damocloid Obs: (125d); Johnston's Archive: damocloid;	MPC; JPL
2018 EG_{4}	2018	(F51)	Pan-STARRS 1	3.5 km	CEN	13.2	0.67	18	4.39	22.0	2.66	Obs: ( 9d); Johnston's Archive: unusual;	MPC; JPL
2018 KH_{3}	2018	(G96)	MLS	8.1 km	TNO	93.8	0.96	47	3.71	184	1.68	Listed in damocloid Obs: (211d); Johnston's Archive: damocloid;	MPC; JPL
2018 MO_{8}	2018	(F51)	Pan-STARRS 1	8.8 km	CEN	15.1	0.67	52	4.99	25.2	1.92	Obs: 4 opposition(s); Johnston's Archive: damocloid;	MPC; JPL
2018 MP_{8}	2018	(F51)	Pan-STARRS 1	3.9 km	TNO	357	0.99	68	3.83	711	0.92	Listed in damocloid Obs: (184d); Johnston's Archive: damocloid;	MPC; JPL
2018 PL_{28}	2018	(F51)	Pan-STARRS 1	4.9 km	CEN	19.5	0.86	74	2.69	36.4	0.80	Listed in damocloid Obs: 3 opposition(s); Johnston's Archive: damocloid;	MPC; JPL
2018 SQ_{13}	2018	(G96)	MLS	3.4 km	TNO	154	0.98	91	2.97	305	0.00	Listed in damocloid Obs: (135d); Johnston's Archive: damocloid;	MPC; JPL
2018 TL_{6}	2018	(G96)	MLS	460 m	CEN	8.3	0.79	171	1.72	14.8	-0.89	Listed in damocloid Obs: ( 10d); Johnston's Archive: damocloid;	MPC; JPL
2018 UB_{1}	2018	(F52)	Pan-STARRS 2	6.4 km	CEN	7.7	0.52	19	3.71	11.6	2.64	Obs: 2 opposition(s); Johnston's Archive: unusual;	MPC; JPL
2018 WB_{1}	2018	(G96)	MLS	1.5 km	CEN	7.3	0.69	152	2.22	12.3	-0.79	Listed in damocloid Obs: 2 opposition(s); Johnston's Archive: damocloid;	MPC; JPL
2019 AH_{54}	2019	(F51)	Pan-STARRS 1	4.9 km	CEN	10.1	0.67	11	3.35	16.9	2.54	Obs: 2 opposition(s); Johnston's Archive: unusual;	MPC; JPL
2019 GG_{23}	2019	(W93)	KMT-CTIO	1.4 km	CEN	6.1	0.29	1	4.39	7.9	2.93	Obs: ( 7d)	MPC; JPL
2019 HC_{4}	2019	(G96)	MLS	4.4 km	CEN	8.8	0.55	134	3.91	13.6	-0.92	Listed in damocloid Obs: 5 opposition(s); Johnston's Archive: damocloid;	MPC; JPL
C/2019 JU6 (ATLAS) (2019 JU_{6})	2019	(T05)	ATLAS-HKO	4.9 km	comet	193	0.99	148	2.04	383	-1.50	Listed in damocloid Obs: ( 2d)	MPC; JPL
2019 KE_{7}	2019	(G96)	MLS	4.6 km	CEN	11.7	0.70	108	3.48	19.9	-0.22	Listed in damocloid Obs: 2 opposition(s); Johnston's Archive: damocloid;	MPC; JPL
2019 KF_{7}	2019	(I41)	ZTF	4.4 km	CEN	6.1	0.53	5	2.90	9.4	2.68	Obs: 2 opposition(s); Johnston's Archive: unusual;	MPC; JPL
2019 KV_{42}	2019	(F51)	Pan-STARRS 1	6.4 km	CEN	11.3	0.57	20	4.82	17.8	2.72	Obs: ( 29d)	MPC; JPL
2019 NN_{10}	2019	(F51)	Pan-STARRS 1	4.4 km	CEN	6.1	0.42	6	3.55	8.7	2.81	Obs: ( 54d); Johnston's Archive: unusual;	MPC; JPL
2019 PN_{2}	2019	(F51)	Pan-STARRS 1	2.3 km	CEN	25.2	0.92	113	2.01	48.3	-0.47	Listed in damocloid Obs: (165d); Johnston's Archive: damocloid;	MPC; JPL
2019 RJ_{2}	2019	(G96)	MLS	8.4 km	CEN	9.8	0.48	23	5.07	14.5	2.74	Obs: 3 opposition(s); Johnston's Archive: centaur;	MPC; JPL
2019 RZ_{16}	2019	(F51)	Pan-STARRS 1	2.3 km	CEN	6.7	0.65	5	2.33	11.0	2.49	Obs: (106d); Johnston's Archive: unusual;	MPC; JPL
2019 UL_{14}	2019	(F51)	Pan-STARRS 1	2.9 km	CEN	10.0	0.51	19	4.89	15.2	2.77	Obs: ( 35d); Johnston's Archive: unusual;	MPC; JPL
2019 UT_{75}	2019	(F51)	Pan-STARRS 1	670 m	CEN	7.6	0.78	5	1.67	13.5	2.19	Obs: ( 5d)	MPC; JPL
2019 YJ_{6}	2019	(F51)	Pan-STARRS 1	1.8 km	TNO	37.7	0.93	22	2.56	72.8	1.95	Listed in damocloid Obs: (189d); Johnston's Archive: damocloid;	MPC; JPL
2020 BF_{13}	2020	(F51)	Pan-STARRS 1	9.4 km	CEN	7.8	0.46	36	4.25	11.3	2.43	Obs: 2 opposition(s); Johnston's Archive: unusual;	MPC; JPL
2020 BV_{64}	2020	(G96)	MLS	3.2 km	CEN	12.0	0.69	10	3.79	20.3	2.61	Obs: ( 27d)	MPC; JPL
2020 DN_{2}	2020	(I41)	ZTF	4.2 km	CEN	6.1	0.46	19	3.31	8.9	2.68	Obs: 4 opposition(s); Johnston's Archive: unusual;	MPC; JPL
2020 EP	2020	(G96)	MLS	2.8 km	CEN	10.5	0.76	76	2.48	18.5	0.93	Listed in damocloid Obs: ( 74d); Johnston's Archive: damocloid;	MPC; JPL
2020 FH_{24}	2020	(G96)	MLS	3.5 km	CEN	14.3	0.77	29	3.27	25.3	2.22	Listed in damocloid Obs: ( 57d)	MPC; JPL
2020 HB_{11}	2020	(G96)	MLS	4.5 km	CEN	16.5	0.71	147	4.84	28.2	-1.81	Listed in damocloid Obs: ( 37d); Johnston's Archive: damocloid;	MPC; JPL
2020 HK_{93}	2020	(F52)	Pan-STARRS 2	2.1 km	CEN	7.2	0.57	17	3.14	11.3	2.58	Obs: ( 29d)	MPC; JPL
2020 KD_{6}	2020	(F51)	Pan-STARRS 1	500 m	CEN	13.1	0.87	39	1.68	24.5	1.61	Listed in damocloid Obs: ( 39d); Johnston's Archive: damocloid;	MPC; JPL
2020 KH_{7}	2020	(F51)	Pan-STARRS 1	4.2 km	CEN	7.9	0.50	106	3.95	11.9	0.06	Listed in damocloid Obs: 2 opposition(s); Johnston's Archive: damocloid;	MPC; JPL
2020 KU_{7}	2020	(F51)	Pan-STARRS 1	4.0 km	TNO	34.8	0.88	104	4.20	65.4	-0.44	Listed in damocloid Obs: 2 opposition(s); Johnston's Archive: damocloid;	MPC; JPL
2020 ML_{1}	2020	(F51)	Pan-STARRS 1	1.3 km	TNO	55.1	0.95	83	2.54	108	0.35	Listed in damocloid Obs: ( 31d); Johnston's Archive: damocloid;	MPC; JPL
2020 OP_{7}	2020	(F51)	Pan-STARRS 1	1.8 km	CEN	28.7	0.90	80	3.00	54.4	0.56	Listed in damocloid Obs: ( 53d)	MPC; JPL
2020 OP_{8}	2020	(F51)	Pan-STARRS 1	6.1 km	CEN	14.1	0.72	30	3.94	24.3	2.34	Obs: (142d)	MPC; JPL
2020 OR_{5}	2020	(F51)	Pan-STARRS 1	3.2 km	CEN	6.2	0.38	167	3.89	8.6	-1.14	Listed in damocloid Obs: 4 opposition(s); Johnston's Archive: unusual;	MPC; JPL
2020 OS_{5}	2020	(F51)	Pan-STARRS 1	1.5 km	CEN	6.8	0.68	156	2.18	11.4	-0.76	Listed in damocloid Obs: ( 8d); Johnston's Archive: unusual;	MPC; JPL
2020 OS_{86}	2020	(F51)	Pan-STARRS 1	4.0 km	CEN	8.3	0.61	7	3.23	13.3	2.61	Obs: ( 29d)	MPC; JPL
2020 QN_{6}	2020	(F51)	Pan-STARRS 1	5.0 km	TNO	673	0.99	77	4.82	1341	0.62	Listed in damocloid Obs: (501d)	MPC; JPL
2020 QP_{42}	2020	(F51)	Pan-STARRS 1	4.0 km	CEN	7.9	0.50	20	3.96	11.9	2.66	Obs: ( 60d)	MPC; JPL
2020 SJ_{5}	2020	(F51)	Pan-STARRS 1	1.9 km	CEN	18.2	0.86	77	2.62	33.7	0.71	Listed in damocloid Obs: ( 52d)	MPC; JPL
2020 SL_{19}	2020	(F52)	Pan-STARRS 2	3.2 km	CEN	7.5	0.62	22	2.82	12.2	2.44	Obs: (165d)	MPC; JPL
2020 SV_{79}	2020	(G96)	MLS	810 m	CEN	17.7	0.89	6	2.03	33.3	2.00	Listed in damocloid Obs: ( 26d)	MPC; JPL
2020 SW_{7}	2020	(F52)	Pan-STARRS 2	7.0 km	CEN	8.9	0.48	15	4.69	13.2	2.81	Obs: 2 opposition(s)	MPC; JPL
2020 TK_{9}	2020	(G96)	MLS	1.5 km	CEN	20.9	0.88	106	2.49	39.3	-0.26	Listed in damocloid Obs: ( 30d)	MPC; JPL
2020 TQ_{14}	2020	(G96)	MLS	1.3 km	CEN	6.0	0.62	27	2.27	9.7	2.37	Obs: ( 67d)	MPC; JPL
2020 TU_{8}	2020	(F52)	Pan-STARRS 2	1.5 km	CEN	6.5	0.65	47	2.31	10.7	1.97	Obs: ( 6d)	MPC; JPL
2020 VS_{6}	2020	(G96)	MLS	610 m	CEN	9.6	0.82	161	1.76	17.5	-0.95	Listed in damocloid Obs: ( 5d)	MPC; JPL
2021 AD_{3}	2021	(F51)	Pan-STARRS 1	4.2 km	CEN	8.4	0.54	29	3.92	13.0	2.50	Obs: ( 3d)	MPC; JPL
2021 AE_{3}	2021	(F51)	Pan-STARRS 1	4.6 km	CEN	8.3	0.43	32	4.77	11.9	2.57	Obs: ( 3d)	MPC; JPL
2021 CE_{22}	2021	(F52)	Pan-STARRS 2	770 m	CEN	7.3	0.77	7	1.69	12.8	2.22	Obs: ( 57d)	MPC; JPL
2021 CT_{3}	2021	(F51)	Pan-STARRS 1	3.4 km	CEN	7.4	0.42	160	4.29	10.6	-1.34	Listed in damocloid Obs: ( 26d)	MPC; JPL
2021 DL_{1}	2021	(G96)	MLS	6.4 km	TNO	35.3	0.89	149	3.93	66.7	-1.89	Listed in damocloid Obs: 3 opposition(s)	MPC; JPL
2021 DN_{2}	2021	(F51)	Pan-STARRS 1	4.2 km	CEN	22.2	0.82	11	3.99	40.3	2.56	Listed in damocloid Obs: (135d)	MPC; JPL
2021 GQ_{57}	2021	(F51)	Pan-STARRS 1	2.5 km	TNO	86.3	0.96	125	3.46	169	-1.25	Listed in damocloid Obs: (112d)	MPC; JPL

back to top

== Characteristics ==
- Extinct comets, which are considered unusual minor planets in having the orbital characteristics of a long period, Jupiter-family or Halley-type comet but showing no sign of cometary activity.
- Damocloids, with typically highly inclined orbits, often being retrograde.

=== Examples ===
- 1996 PW (TNO, LPC)
- 1998 WU24 (CEN, HTC)
- (33342) 1998 WT24 (NEO)
- 2011 YU75 (CEN)

== See also ==
- Distant minor planet
