= 2013 LA2 =

High-inclination centaur

2013 LA_{2}
Discovery
- Discovered by: Pan-STARRS 1
- Discovery site: Pan-STARRS
- Discovery date: 1 June 2013 (first observed only)

Designations
- Minor planet category: centaur · damocloid unusual · main-belt

Orbital characteristics
- Epoch 31 May 2020 (JD 2459000.5)
- Uncertainty parameter 7
- Observation arc: 41 days
- Aphelion: 8.331 AU
- Perihelion: 3.0376 AU
- Semi-major axis: 5.6841 AU
- Eccentricity: 0.4656
- Orbital period (sidereal): 13.55 yr (4,950 d)
- Mean anomaly: 197.7432°
- Mean motion: 0° 4^{m} 21.72^{s} / day
- Inclination: 175.09°
- Longitude of ascending node: 243.90°
- Argument of perihelion: 325.17°
- Jupiter MOID: 0.1752 AU
- Saturn MOID: 0.8945 AU
- T_{Jupiter}: –0.928

Physical characteristics
- Mean diameter: 1.8 km (est.)
- Geometric albedo: 0.09 (assumed)
- Absolute magnitude (H): 16.9

2013 LA_{2} is a centaur and damocloid on a cometary-like and retrograde orbit from the outer Solar System, suggesting that it is an extinct comet. It was first observed on 1 June 2013 by astronomers with the Pan-STARRS survey at Haleakala Observatory, Hawaii, in the United States. The object measures approximately 1.8 kilometers (1.1 miles) in diameter. It holds the record for having the highest orbital inclination of any known minor planet.

== Orbit and classification ==
2013 LA_{2} orbits the Sun at a distance of 3.0–12.0 AU once every 20 years and 7 months (7,519 days; semi-major axis of 7.51 AU). Its orbit has an eccentricity of 0.59 and an inclination of 175° with respect to the ecliptic.

It has the highest orbital inclination of any known minor planet which gives it a retrograde orbit. The object's orbit takes it from the outer region of the asteroid belt to between the orbit of Saturn (9.5 AU) and Uranus (19.2 AU). The body's short observation arc of less than a month begins with its first observation on 1 June 2013. It has not since been observed.

== Physical characteristics ==
Johnston's archive assumes an albedo 0.09 and calculates a diameter of 1.8 kilometers.

== See also ==
- List of notable asteroids § Retrograde and highly inclined
