= (336756) 2010 NV1 =

Trans-Neptunian object

(336756) 2010 NV_{1}
Discovery
- Discovered by: WISE
- Discovery site: space-based
- Discovery date: 1 July 2010

Designations
- Minor planet category: TNO · centaur distant

Orbital characteristics
- Epoch 1 July 2021 (JD 2459396.5)
- Uncertainty parameter 0 · 1
- Observation arc: 5.87 yr (2,143 d)
- Aphelion: 547.23 AU; 563 AU (barycentric) (Note: Given the orbital eccentricity of this object, different epochs can generate quite different heliocentric unperturbed two-body best-fit solutions to the semi-major axis and orbital period. For objects at such high eccentricity, the Sun's barycentric coordinates are more stable than heliocentric coordinates. Using JPL Horizons, the barycentric semi-major axis is approximately 286 AU.)
- Perihelion: 9.4211 AU
- Semi-major axis: 278.33 AU; 286 AU (barycentric)
- Eccentricity: 0.9662
- Orbital period (sidereal): 4643.41 yr 4830 yr (barycentric)
- Mean anomaly: 0.8196°
- Mean motion: 0° 0^{m} 0.72^{s} / day
- Inclination: 140.73°
- Longitude of ascending node: 136.09°
- Argument of perihelion: 132.72°
- Saturn MOID: 1.15 AU
- T_{Jupiter}: -2.9030

Physical characteristics
- Mean diameter: 44.2±8.0 km; 52.2±4.5 km
- Geometric albedo: 0.042; 0.057±0.030
- Spectral type: B–V = 0.740±0.030; V–R = 0.500±0.020; BR = 1.240±0.020
- Apparent magnitude: 23.96
- Absolute magnitude (H): 10.4; 10.50

(336756) 2010 NV_{1} is a highly eccentric planet-crossing trans-Neptunian object, also classified as a centaur and damocloid, approximately 52 kilometers (32 miles) in diameter. It is on a retrograde cometary orbit. It has a barycentric semi-major axis (average distance from the Sun) of approximately 286 AU.

== History ==
=== Discovery ===
2010 NV_{1} was discovered on 1 July 2010, by NASA's space-based Wide-field Infrared Survey Explorer (WISE). It was first observed by the Mount Lemmon Survey in 2009, extending the body's observation arc by 8 months prior to its official discovery observation by WISE.

=== Numbering and naming ===
This minor planet was numbered by the Minor Planet Center on 31 August 2012 (M.P.C. 80287). As of 2025, it has not been named.

== Orbit and classification ==
Orbital evolution
Epoch	Aphelion	Orbital period
1950	561 AU	4820 yrs
2050	563 AU	4830 yrs

2010 NV_{1} orbits the Sun at a distance of 9.4–547.2 AU once every 4643 years and 5 months (1,696,004 days; semi-major axis of 278.33 AU). Its orbit has an eccentricity of 0.97 and an inclination of 141° with respect to the ecliptic. It came to perihelion in December 2010 at a distance of 9.4 AU from the Sun. As of 2021, it is 21.3 AU from the Sun. It will not be 50 AU from the Sun until late 2044. After leaving the planetary region of the Solar System, 2010 NV_{1} will have a barycentric aphelion of 563 AU with an orbital period of 4830 years. In a 10 million year integration of the orbit, the nominal (best-fit) orbit and both 3-sigma clones remain outside 7.7AU (q_{min}) from the Sun.

== Physical characteristics ==
According to the surveys carried out by the NEOWISE mission, 2010 NV_{1} measures 44.2 kilometers in diameter and its surface has a low albedo of 0.057. More recent published data gives a diameter of 52.2±4.5 kilometers with an albedo of 0.042.
