= C/2001 OG108 (LONEOS) =

Halley-type comet

C/2001 OG_{108} (LONEOS)
Discovery
- Discovered by: M. E. Van Ness
- Discovery site: Lowell Observatory (LONEOS)
- Discovery date: 28 July 2001

Orbital characteristics
- Epoch: 5 December 2001 (JD 2452248.5)
- Observation arc: 340 days
- Number of observations: 882
- Aphelion: 25.606 AU
- Perihelion: 0.994 AU
- Semi-major axis: 13.300 AU
- Eccentricity: 0.92526
- Orbital period: 48.51 years
- Inclination: 80.245°
- Longitude of ascending node: 10.555°
- Argument of periapsis: 116.42°
- Last perihelion: 15 March 2002
- Next perihelion: 7 June 2050
- T_{Jupiter}: 0.597
- Earth MOID: 0.301 AU
- Jupiter MOID: 0.968 AU

Physical characteristics
- Dimensions: 13.6 ± 1.0 km (8.45 ± 0.62 mi)
- Synodic rotation period: 57.2±0.5 hours
- Geometric albedo: 0.054
- Spectral type: (V–R) = 0.46±0.02
- Comet total magnitude (M1): 13.3

C/2001 OG_{108} (LONEOS) is a Halley-type comet with an orbital period of 48.51 years. It was discovered on 28 July 2001 by the LONEOS telescope at Lowell Observatory. Of the short-period comets with known diameters and perihelion inside the orbit of Earth, C/2001 OG_{108} is the second largest after Comet Swift–Tuttle.

== Orbit ==
Observations taken in January and February 2002 showed that the "asteroid" had developed a small amount of cometary activity as it approached perihelion. It was subsequently reclassified as a comet. The comet came to perihelion (closest approach to the Sun) on 15 March 2002. It will come to aphelion in 2026 and the next perihelion passage is calculated to be on 7 June 2050. On 23 March 2147 the comet will pass about 0.42 AU (63 million km; 160 LD) from Earth with an uncertainty region of about ±2 million km.

C/2001 OG108 (LONEOS) Closest Earth Approach on 2147-Mar-23 11:20 UT
Date & time of closest approach	Earth distance (AU)	Sun distance (AU)	Velocity wrt Earth (km/s)	Velocity wrt Sun (km/s)	Uncertainty region (3-sigma)	Reference
2147-03-23 11:20 ± 13:38	0.42 AU (63 million km; 39 million mi; 160 LD)	1.35 AU (202 million km; 125 million mi; 530 LD)	40.3	35.3	± 2 million km	Horizons

This comet probably represents the transition between typical Halley-family/long-period comets and extinct comets. Damocloids have been studied as possible extinct cometary candidates due to the similarity of their orbital parameters with those of Halley-family comets.

== Physical properties ==
The comet has a rotational period of 2.38 ± 0.02 days (57.12 hr).

In 2003, the comet was estimated to have a mean absolute V magnitude (H) of 13.05 ± 0.10, with an albedo of 0.03, giving an effective radius of 8.9 ± 0.7 km (5.53 ± 0.43 mi). Using data from Fernandez (2004–2005) JPL lists the comet with an albedo of 0.05 and a diameter of 13.6 ± 1.0 km (8.45 ± 0.62 mi)

== See also ==
- List of Halley-type comets
