= 5335 Damocles =

Centaur

(5335) Damocles
Discovery
- Discovered by: R. H. McNaught
- Discovery site: Siding Spring Obs.
- Discovery date: 18 February 1991

Designations
- Pronunciation: /ˈdæməkliːz/
- Named after: Damocles (Greek mythology)
- Alternative designations: 1991 DA
- Minor planet category: distant centaur · damocloid
- Adjectives: Damoclean (/dæməˈkliːən/)
- Symbol: (astrological)

Orbital characteristics
- Epoch 4 September 2017 (JD 2458000.5)
- Uncertainty parameter 4
- Observation arc: 1.51 yr (551 days)
- Aphelion: 22.078 AU
- Perihelion: 1.5741 AU
- Semi-major axis: 11.826 AU
- Eccentricity: 0.8669
- Orbital period (sidereal): 40.67 Jyr (14,854 days)
- Mean anomaly: 236.35°
- Mean motion: 0° 1^{m} 27.12^{s} / day
- Inclination: 61.875°
- Longitude of ascending node: 314.14°
- Argument of perihelion: 191.26°
- Mars MOID: 0.05787 AU
- T_{Jupiter}: 1.149

Physical characteristics
- Dimensions: 14 km (assumed using albedo of 0.048)
- Apparent magnitude: 26.56
- Absolute magnitude (H): 13.3

5335 Damocles /ˈdæməkliːz/, provisional designation 1991 DA, is an astronomical centaur and the namesake of the damocloids, a group of minor planets which may be inactive nuclei of the Halley-type and long-period comets. It was discovered on 18 February 1991, by Australian astronomer Robert McNaught at Siding Spring Observatory in Australia. It is named after Damocles, a figure of Greek mythology.

== Description ==
When Damocles was discovered, it was found to be on an orbit completely different from all others known. Damocles's orbit reached from inside the aphelion of Mars to as far as Uranus. It seemed to be in transition from a near-circular outer Solar System orbit to an eccentric orbit taking it to the inner Solar System. Duncan Steel, Gerhard Hahn, Mark Bailey, and David Asher carried out projections of its long-term dynamical evolution, and found a good probability that it will become an Earth-crosser asteroid, and may spend a quarter of its life in such an orbit. Damocles has a stable orbit for tens of thousands of years before and after the present, because its highly inclined orbit does not take it near Jupiter or Saturn.

There is some speculation that Damocles may have a meteor shower associated with it on Mars from the direction of Draco. The object has a Mars minimum orbit intersection distance (Mars MOID) of 0.057 AU (8,500,000 km; 5,300,000 mi) and a Uranus MOID of 0.3 AU (45,000,000 km; 28,000,000 mi).

As of 2019, Damocles is 19.6 AU from the Sun with an apparent magnitude of 26.3. It reached its furthest point from the Sun in 2011.

The adjectival form is Damoclean, /dæməˈkliːən/. The official naming citation was published by the Minor Planet Center on 1 September 1993 (M.P.C. 22508).

== See also ==
- The sword of Damocles – an over-hanging threat, a long-standing political metaphor from ancient Greece.
