= Damocloid =

Class of minor planets

Damocloids are a class of minor planets such as 5335 Damocles (which is also the prototype and namesake of the group) and 1996 PW that have Halley-type or long-period highly eccentric orbits typical of periodic comets such as Halley's Comet, but without showing a cometary coma or tail. David C. Jewitt defines a damocloid as an object with a Jupiter Tisserand invariant (T_{J}) of 2 or less, (Note: The Jupiter Tisserand invariant or Tisserand's parameter with respect to Jupiter can be derived from Jupiter's semi-major axis (a_{J}) and the minor planet's orbital elements (a, e and i) as follows: a_{J}/a + 2(cos i) × √ a/a_{J} × (1-e^{2}) Note In order to agree with the data displayed at the JPL Small-Body Database from which the orbital elements are sourced, the calculation of the Tisserand invariant uses a value of 5.203363 AU for Jupiter's osculating semi-major axis (a_{J}). Also, the degrees of the objects inclination need to be converted into the radian equivalent such as in: ($a_j / $a) + (2 * cos(deg2rad($i))) * sqrt(($a/$a_j) * (1 – $e * $e)).) while Akimasa Nakamura defines this group with the following orbital elements:

- q < 5.2 AU, a > 8.0 AU, and e > 0.75,
- or alternatively, i > 90°

However, this definition that does not focus on Jupiter excludes objects such as (127546) 2002 XU93, 2003 WG_{166}, and (661238) 2004 DA_{62}.

Using the Tisserand's parameter with respect to Jupiter of 2 or less, there are currently 220 damocloid candidates as of January 2022. Of these objects, 189 have orbital observation arcs greater than 30 days providing reasonably decent orbits. Their average radius is eight kilometers assuming an albedo of 0.04. The albedos of four damocloids have been measured, and they are among the darkest objects known in the Solar System. Damocloids are reddish in color, but not as red as many Kuiper-belt objects or centaurs. Other damocloids include: (709487) 2013 BL76, (668643) 2012 DR30, (528219) 2008 KV42, (65407) 2002 RP120, and 20461 Dioretsa.

Retrograde objects such as Halley's Comet and damocloid 343158 Marsyas can have relative velocities to Earth of 81 km/s (290,000 km/h).

== Origin ==
Damocloids are thought to be nuclei of Halley-type comets that have lost all their volatile materials due to outgassing and become dormant. Such comets probably originate from the Oort cloud. This hypothesis is strengthened by the fact that a number of objects thought to be damocloids (and assigned minor-planet provisional designations) subsequently showed a coma and were confirmed to be comets: C/2001 OG_{108} (LONEOS), C/2002 CE_{10} (LINEAR), C/2002 VQ_{94} (LINEAR), C/2004 HV_{60} (Spacewatch) and possibly others. Another strong indication of cometary origin is the fact that some damocloids have retrograde orbits—they have an inclination beyond 90 degrees up to 180 degrees.

== List ==
As of August 2021 this list from the JPL SBDB contains 20 numbered and 268 unnumbered bodies that meet Akimasa Nakamura's criteria for being classified as a damocloid, that is, either a retrograde orbit, or the following orbital elements: q < 5.2 AU, a > 8.0 AU, and e > 0.75 (also see § top). Tisserand's parameter with respect to Jupiter (T_{Jupiter}) is also given. Akimasa Nakamura's criteria and a T_{Jupiter} of less than two are largely equivalent as only a few listed bodies do not meet the defined T_{Jupiter} threshold. Most damocloids are also listed on MPC's list of other unusual minor planets. The orbital data is sourced from JPL-numbered and -unnumbered element files. The list includes A/-designated objects (introduced in 2017) that were mistakenly identified as a comet, but are actually minor planets. However it excludes hyperbolic bodies such as A/2019 G4 as well as unbounded, interstellar objects such as 1I/ʻOumuamua and 2I/Borisov.

Designation	a (AU)	e	i (°)	Orbital criteria and classes				q (AU)	Q (AU)	Unusual	Catalog	Refs
Designation	a (AU)	e	i (°)	Cls	Retro	T_{Jupiter}	T_{J} ≤ 2	q (AU)	Q (AU)	Unusual	Catalog	Refs
5335 Damocles	11.85	0.866	61.6	CEN	—	1.158	✓	1.59	22.11	—	LoMP	MPC · JPL
(15504) 1999 RG33	9.37	0.774	35	CEN	—	1.948	✓	2.12	16.63	unusual	LoMP	MPC · JPL
20461 Dioretsa	23.88	0.901	160.4	CEN	✓	−1.534	✓	2.37	45.39	unusual	LoMP	MPC · JPL
(65407) 2002 RP120	53.66	0.954	119.3	TNO	✓	−0.844	✓	2.46	104.86	unusual	LoMP	MPC · JPL
(154783) 2004 PA44	14.23	0.76	3.3	CEN	—	2.513	—	3.42	25.04	unusual	LoMP	MPC · JPL
(330759) 2008 SO218	8.12	0.562	170.3	CEN	✓	−1.397	✓	3.56	12.69	unusual	LoMP	MPC · JPL
(336756) 2010 NV1	278.33	0.966	140.7	TNO	✓	−2.903	✓	9.42	547.23	—	LoMP	MPC · JPL
(342842) 2008 YB3	11.58	0.442	105.1	CEN	✓	−0.246	✓	6.47	16.7	—	LoMP	MPC · JPL
343158 Marsyas	2.53	0.807	154.4	NEO	✓	1.317	✓	0.49	4.57	—	LoMP	MPC · JPL
(434620) 2005 VD	6.67	0.251	172.9	CEN	✓	−1.394	✓	5	8.34	unusual	LoMP	MPC · JPL
(459870) 2014 AT28	10.9	0.401	165.5	CEN	✓	−2.090	✓	6.53	15.27	—	LoMP	MPC · JPL
(468861) 2013 LU28	191.63	0.954	125.3	TNO	✓	−2.069	✓	8.74	374.53	—	LoMP	MPC · JPL
471325 Taowu	35.7	0.33	110.2	TNO	✓	−1.560	✓	23.9	47.5	—	LoMP	MPC · JPL
514107 Kaʻepaokaʻāwela	5.13	0.378	163.1	other	✓	−0.745	✓	3.19	7.07	—	LoMP	MPC · JPL
(518151) 2016 FH13	24.54	0.615	93.6	CEN	✓	−0.005	✓	9.45	39.62	—	LoMP	MPC · JPL
(523797) 2016 NM56	71.46	0.853	144	TNO	✓	−3.061	✓	10.53	132.38	—	LoMP	MPC · JPL
(523800) 2017 KZ31	54.3	0.798	161.7	TNO	✓	−3.601	✓	10.96	97.63	—	LoMP	MPC · JPL
(528219) 2008 KV42	42.03	0.497	103.4	TNO	✓	−1.021	✓	21.15	62.92	—	LoMP	MPC · JPL
(582301) 2015 RM306	246.87	0.954	176	TNO	✓	−4.117	✓	11.46	482.29	—	LoMP	MPC · JPL
(585899) 2020 HM_{98}	83.6	0.841	137.9	TNO	✓	−3.151	✓	13.26	153.94	—	LoMP	MPC · JPL
(612093) 1999 LE31	8.17	0.468	151.5	CEN	✓	−1.309	✓	4.35	11.99	—	LoMP	MPC · JPL
1996 PW	265.49	0.991	30.1	TNO	—	1.708	✓	2.49	528.5	unusual	—	MPC · JPL
1997 MD_{10}	26.49	0.943	59.4	CEN	—	0.960	✓	1.51	51.47	—	—	MPC · JPL
1998 QJ_{1}	11.24	0.815	23.7	CEN	—	2.023	—	2.08	20.41	unusual	—	MPC · JPL
1998 WU_{24}	15.13	0.907	42.5	CEN	—	1.404	✓	1.41	28.85	—	—	MPC · JPL
1999 XS35	17.77	0.948	19.5	NEO	—	1.405	✓	0.93	34.62	—	—	MPC · JPL
2000 AB_{229}	52.32	0.956	68.2	TNO	—	0.790	✓	2.31	102.33	unusual	—	MPC · JPL
2000 DG8	10.77	0.793	129.3	CEN	✓	−0.627	✓	2.23	19.31	unusual	—	MPC · JPL
2000 HE_{46}	23.66	0.9	158.6	CEN	✓	−1.510	✓	2.37	44.95	unusual	—	MPC · JPL
2000 KP_{65}	90.21	0.963	45.6	TNO	—	1.630	✓	3.34	177.07	unusual	—	MPC · JPL
2002 AR_{91}	75.23	0.965	17.6	TNO	—	1.965	✓	2.62	147.84	unusual	—	MPC · JPL
2002 RN109	564.68	0.995	58.5	TNO	—	1.069	✓	2.67	1126.68	unusual	—	MPC · JPL
2003 UY_{283}	33.1	0.895	18.9	TNO	—	2.283	—	3.46	62.74	—	—	MPC · JPL
2003 WN_{188}	14.39	0.846	26.8	CEN	—	1.946	✓	2.22	26.56	unusual	—	MPC · JPL
2004 CM_{111}	33.28	0.849	4.7	TNO	—	2.818	—	5.02	61.55	—	—	MPC · JPL
2004 NN_{8}	100.43	0.977	165.6	TNO	✓	−1.781	✓	2.36	198.5	unusual	—	MPC · JPL
(848535) 2004 PB_{59}	10.45	0.873	4	CEN	—	1.879	✓	1.33	19.57	—	—	MPC · JPL
2004 VM_{4}	11.56	0.882	9.2	CEN	—	1.838	✓	1.37	21.76	—	—	MPC · JPL
2005 HL_{3}	11.29	0.831	35.6	CEN	—	1.794	✓	1.91	20.67	unusual	—	MPC · JPL
(661762) 2005 NP_{82}	5.87	0.478	130.5	CEN	✓	−0.327	✓	3.07	8.67	—	LoMP	MPC · JPL
2005 OE	63.24	0.952	67.5	TNO	—	0.901	✓	3.05	123.43	unusual	—	MPC · JPL
2005 PF_{26}	13.54	0.892	23.2	CEN	—	1.727	✓	1.47	25.61	—	—	MPC · JPL
2005 SB_{223}	29.41	0.905	91.5	CEN	✓	0.124	✓	2.79	56.03	unusual	—	MPC · JPL
2005 TJ_{50}	9.16	0.584	110.3	CEN	✓	−0.180	✓	3.81	14.51	unusual	—	MPC · JPL
2005 UH_{525}	17.78	0.908	14.2	CEN	—	1.797	✓	1.64	33.91	—	—	MPC · JPL
2005 VX3	838.42	0.995	112.4	TNO	✓	−0.948	✓	4.1	1672.73	unusual	—	MPC · JPL
2006 BZ8	9.6	0.803	165.3	CEN	✓	−1.024	✓	1.89	17.31	unusual	—	MPC · JPL
(794190) 2006 BV_{124}	29.57	0.936	9	CEN	—	1.829	✓	1.88	57.26	—	—	MPC · JPL
2006 EX_{52}	42.12	0.939	150.2	TNO	✓	−1.571	✓	2.56	81.68	unusual	—	MPC · JPL
2006 LM1	32.19	0.885	172.1	TNO	✓	−2.133	✓	3.7	60.67	—	—	MPC · JPL
2006 RG_{1}	25.68	0.921	133.5	CEN	✓	−0.992	✓	2.04	49.32	unusual	—	MPC · JPL
2006 RJ2	9.67	0.76	164.7	CEN	✓	−1.172	✓	2.32	17.02	unusual	—	MPC · JPL
2006 SO_{134}	19.52	0.832	4.2	CEN	—	2.409	—	3.28	35.77	unusual	—	MPC · JPL
2007 BJ_{63}	8.58	0.811	11	CEN	—	2.081	—	1.62	15.54	—	—	MPC · JPL
2007 DA_{61}	445.81	0.994	76.5	TNO	—	0.484	✓	2.66	888.96	unusual	—	MPC · JPL
2007 TG_{250}	21.29	0.926	10.6	CEN	—	1.747	✓	1.58	41	—	—	MPC · JPL
2007 VJ_{200}	24.35	0.941	7.2	CEN	—	1.664	✓	1.43	47.27	—	—	MPC · JPL
2007 VW_{266}	5.44	0.39	108.3	other	✓	0.364	✓	3.32	7.57	—	—	MPC · JPL
2008 BN_{18}	30.34	0.914	28.8	TNO	—	1.889	✓	2.61	58.07	unusual	—	MPC · JPL
2008 SE_{82}	19.35	0.836	17.4	CEN	—	2.288	—	3.17	35.53	unusual	—	MPC · JPL
2008 UW_{44}	5.69	0.617	96	CEN	✓	0.742	✓	2.18	9.2	—	—	MPC · JPL
2008 WA_{95}	14.01	0.878	60.2	CEN	—	1.151	✓	1.7	26.31	unusual	—	MPC · JPL
2009 AU_{16}	23.54	0.917	69.9	CEN	—	0.804	✓	1.95	45.13	unusual	—	MPC · JPL
2009 DD_{47}	48.87	0.954	107.4	TNO	✓	−0.440	✓	2.23	95.5	—	—	MPC · JPL
2009 FW_{23}	11.52	0.855	86.4	CEN	—	0.548	✓	1.67	21.37	unusual	—	MPC · JPL
2009 KK_{31}	20.04	0.923	22.8	CEN	—	1.653	✓	1.55	38.54	—	—	MPC · JPL
2009 QY_{6}	12.47	0.833	137.8	CEN	✓	−0.852	✓	2.08	22.87	unusual	—	MPC · JPL
2009 SE_{8}	13.26	0.902	18	CEN	—	1.706	✓	1.3	25.21	—	—	MPC · JPL
2009 WX_{199}	31.3	0.955	8.7	TNO	—	1.603	✓	1.41	61.2	—	—	MPC · JPL
(614592) 2009 YS6	20.16	0.919	147.8	CEN	✓	−1.052	✓	1.63	38.7	—	LoMP	MPC · JPL
(831994) 2010 AK_{111}	10.7	0.792	26.2	CEN	—	2.057	—	2.22	19.17	—	—	MPC · JPL
2010 BK118	378.15	0.984	143.9	TNO	✓	−2.454	✓	6.11	750.19	—	—	MPC · JPL
2010 CG_{55}	31.72	0.91	146.1	TNO	✓	−1.538	✓	2.86	60.57	unusual	—	MPC · JPL
2010 CA_{100}	10.96	0.88	8.1	CEN	—	1.842	✓	1.32	20.6	—	—	MPC · JPL
2010 EB_{46}	31.63	0.952	156.6	TNO	✓	−1.215	✓	1.5	61.75	—	—	MPC · JPL
2010 EJ_{104}	21.61	0.9	41.4	CEN	—	1.574	✓	2.16	41.06	—	—	MPC · JPL
2010 ER_{144}	10.89	0.827	8.8	CEN	—	2.083	—	1.88	19.91	—	—	MPC · JPL
2010 EV_{159}	23.07	0.927	18.6	CEN	—	1.726	✓	1.69	44.45	—	—	MPC · JPL
2010 EQ_{169}	2.09	0.093	92	MBA	✓	2.449	—	1.89	2.28	—	—	MPC · JPL
2010 EX_{175}	49.39	0.946	29.2	TNO	—	1.844	✓	2.65	96.14	unusual	—	MPC · JPL
2010 GW_{64}	62.46	0.941	105.2	TNO	✓	−0.533	✓	3.69	121.23	unusual	—	MPC · JPL
2010 GW_{147}	173.9	0.969	99.9	TNO	✓	−0.462	✓	5.39	342.42	unusual	—	MPC · JPL
2010 HK_{126}	14.45	0.897	121.6	CEN	✓	−0.414	✓	1.5	27.4	—	—	MPC · JPL
(833309) 2010 JX_{16}	24.22	0.898	16.9	CEN	—	2.033	—	2.47	45.96	—	—	MPC · JPL
2010 JH_{124}	70.08	0.963	53.4	TNO	—	1.262	✓	2.63	137.54	unusual	—	MPC · JPL
2010 JC_{147}	14.6	0.762	41.6	CEN	—	1.979	✓	3.48	25.72	unusual	—	MPC · JPL
(761729) 2010 JB_{184}	44.84	0.932	18.7	TNO	—	2.138	—	3.07	86.62	unusual	—	MPC · JPL
2010 JA_{191}	10.02	0.793	15.1	CEN	—	2.153	—	2.08	17.96	—	—	MPC · JPL
2010 LG_{61}	6.28	0.783	123.8	CEN	✓	0.069	✓	1.36	11.19	—	—	MPC · JPL
2010 LN_{135}	2169.28	0.999	64.7	TNO	—	0.699	✓	1.72	4336.84	unusual	—	MPC · JPL
2010 MK_{19}	14.86	0.805	25.6	CEN	—	2.160	—	2.9	26.81	—	—	MPC · JPL
2010 OR_{1}	26.98	0.924	143.9	CEN	✓	−1.219	✓	2.06	51.89	unusual	—	MPC · JPL
2010 OU_{100}	17.29	0.891	15.2	CEN	—	1.901	✓	1.89	32.7	—	—	MPC · JPL
2010 OM_{101}	26.1	0.918	118.8	CEN	✓	−0.657	✓	2.14	50.06	unusual	—	MPC · JPL
(666496) 2010 OT_{128}	28.67	0.903	25.8	CEN	—	1.996	✓	2.78	54.56	—	LoMP	MPC · JPL
2010 PK_{16}	18.82	0.905	27.7	CEN	—	1.711	✓	1.79	35.85	—	—	MPC · JPL
2010 PO_{58}	13.18	0.78	121.4	CEN	✓	−0.643	✓	2.9	23.46	unusual	—	MPC · JPL
2010 RA_{17}	22.91	0.939	11.3	CEN	—	1.646	✓	1.4	44.41	—	—	MPC · JPL
2011 BP_{141}	11.34	0.864	4.5	CEN	—	1.940	✓	1.54	21.15	—	—	MPC · JPL
2011 FB_{107}	21.06	0.924	3.7	CEN	—	1.780	✓	1.6	40.52	—	—	MPC · JPL
2011 GN_{27}	15.75	0.4	153.4	CEN	✓	−2.522	✓	9.45	22.06	—	—	MPC · JPL
2011 MM4	21.26	0.473	100.5	CEN	✓	−0.404	✓	11.2	31.33	—	—	MPC · JPL
2011 OR_{17}	288.79	0.989	110.4	TNO	✓	−0.745	✓	3.12	574.45	unusual	—	MPC · JPL
2011 SP_{25}	19.58	0.884	109.3	CEN	✓	−0.334	✓	2.28	36.88	unusual	—	MPC · JPL
(856262) 2011 SH_{210}	8.1	0.798	16.2	CEN	—	2.087	—	1.64	14.56	—	—	MPC · JPL
2011 UT_{368}	8.94	0.78	23.9	CEN	—	2.081	—	1.96	15.92	—	—	MPC · JPL
2011 UR_{402}	18.56	0.778	24.6	CEN	—	2.439	—	4.12	33	unusual	—	MPC · JPL
2011 WS_{41}	37.66	0.945	141.6	TNO	✓	−1.239	✓	2.06	73.26	unusual	—	MPC · JPL
2012 DT_{42}	45.16	0.969	1.2	TNO	—	1.582	✓	1.42	88.9	—	—	MPC · JPL
2012 HD_{2}	62.79	0.959	146.7	TNO	✓	−1.555	✓	2.55	123.03	unusual	—	MPC · JPL
2012 KA_{51}	484.17	0.99	70.9	TNO	—	0.906	✓	4.89	963.46	unusual	—	MPC · JPL
2012 TF_{72}	11.14	0.864	5.3	CEN	—	1.934	✓	1.51	20.76	—	—	MPC · JPL
2012 TT_{72}	9.58	0.86	5.1	CEN	—	1.920	✓	1.34	17.83	—	—	MPC · JPL
2012 TQ_{111}	13.44	0.884	8	CEN	—	1.877	✓	1.56	25.32	—	—	MPC · JPL
2012 TL_{139}	29.89	0.882	160	CEN	✓	−1.950	✓	3.53	56.26	—	—	MPC · JPL
2012 VG_{94}	10.57	0.83	8.5	CEN	—	2.066	—	1.8	19.34	—	—	MPC · JPL
2012 YO_{6}	6.31	0.478	106.9	CEN	✓	0.262	✓	3.29	9.33	unusual	—	MPC · JPL
2012 YE_{8}	9.29	0.588	136.1	CEN	✓	−0.996	✓	3.83	14.74	unusual	—	MPC · JPL
2013 BN_{27}	59.15	0.974	101.8	TNO	✓	−0.225	✓	1.55	116.75	—	—	MPC · JPL
(709487) 2013 BL76	958.56	0.991	98.6	TNO	✓	−0.528	✓	8.37	1908.74	—	—	MPC · JPL
(799069) 2013 CY_{167}	10.31	0.848	5.9	CEN	—	1.989	✓	1.57	19.05	—	—	MPC · JPL
2013 HS_{150}	58.04	0.951	97.1	TNO	✓	−0.164	✓	2.82	113.27	unusual	—	MPC · JPL
2013 JD_{4}	11.99	0.863	72.9	CEN	—	0.883	✓	1.64	22.34	—	—	MPC · JPL
2013 LA2	5.68	0.466	175.1	CEN	✓	−0.926	✓	3.03	8.33	—	—	MPC · JPL
2013 LD_{16}	81.49	0.969	154.7	TNO	✓	−1.708	✓	2.54	160.45	unusual	—	MPC · JPL
2013 LG_{29}	17.05	0.791	15.4	CEN	—	2.442	—	3.57	30.54	unusual	—	MPC · JPL
2013 NS_{11}	12.58	0.786	130.4	CEN	✓	−0.831	✓	2.69	22.47	unusual	—	MPC · JPL
2013 PS_{21}	11.01	0.836	11.3	CEN	—	2.039	—	1.81	20.22	—	—	MPC · JPL
2013 RA_{96}	19.84	0.92	5.2	CEN	—	1.783	✓	1.58	38.1	—	—	MPC · JPL
2013 SM_{99}	34.03	0.91	14.3	TNO	—	2.206	—	3.06	65	—	—	MPC · JPL
2013 YG_{48}	8.17	0.752	61.3	CEN	—	1.430	✓	2.03	14.31	unusual	—	MPC · JPL
2014 CW_{14}	32.9	0.869	170.8	TNO	✓	−2.297	✓	4.31	61.48	—	—	MPC · JPL
2014 HM_{59}	12.72	0.886	9.6	CEN	—	1.841	✓	1.45	23.99	—	—	MPC · JPL
2014 HX_{64}	13.47	0.893	4.4	CEN	—	1.831	✓	1.44	25.5	—	—	MPC · JPL
2014 HS_{67}	8.99	0.854	6.5	CEN	—	1.938	✓	1.31	16.68	—	—	MPC · JPL
2014 HT_{94}	13.22	0.894	5.6	CEN	—	1.814	✓	1.4	25.03	—	—	MPC · JPL
2014 HJ_{104}	9.24	0.844	9.5	CEN	—	1.971	✓	1.44	17.04	—	—	MPC · JPL
2014 HU_{110}	10.38	0.842	6.8	CEN	—	2.013	—	1.64	19.12	—	—	MPC · JPL
2014 HW_{113}	19.98	0.928	8.8	CEN	—	1.708	✓	1.45	38.52	—	—	MPC · JPL
2014 HC_{114}	13.16	0.889	9.8	CEN	—	1.832	✓	1.46	24.86	—	—	MPC · JPL
(782819) 2014 JJ_{57}	7	0.291	95.9	CEN	✓	0.514	✓	4.97	9.04	unusual	—	MPC · JPL
2014 MH_{55}	44.84	0.9	92.4	TNO	✓	0.010	✓	4.5	85.18	unusual	—	MPC · JPL
2014 PP_{69}	21.37	0.941	93.7	NEO	✓	0.155	✓	1.25	41.48	—	—	MPC · JPL
2014 QZ_{111}	12.18	0.865	15.8	CEN	—	1.903	✓	1.64	22.72	—	—	MPC · JPL
2014 QW_{243}	8.26	0.76	18.1	CEN	—	2.187	—	1.98	14.53	—	—	MPC · JPL
2014 QU_{250}	12.33	0.867	9.1	CEN	—	1.937	✓	1.64	23.02	—	—	MPC · JPL
2014 QP_{482}	18.81	0.918	3.8	CEN	—	1.781	✓	1.54	36.07	—	—	MPC · JPL
2014 SQ_{339}	28.84	0.903	128.6	CEN	✓	−1.078	✓	2.79	54.89	unusual	—	MPC · JPL
2014 UG_{6}	12.4	0.889	7.1	CEN	—	1.821	✓	1.37	23.43	—	—	MPC · JPL
2014 UU_{26}	11.6	0.874	1.5	CEN	—	1.898	✓	1.46	21.75	—	—	MPC · JPL
2014 UK_{70}	22.47	0.72	169.3	CEN	✓	−2.602	✓	6.29	38.64	—	—	MPC · JPL
2014 UV_{114}	13.86	0.71	171	CEN	✓	−1.895	✓	4.02	23.7	unusual	—	MPC · JPL
2014 UC_{241}	9.58	0.756	7.4	CEN	—	2.304	—	2.34	16.83	—	—	MPC · JPL
(778992) 2014 WK_{346}	8.37	0.841	9.2	CEN	—	1.976	✓	1.33	15.41	—	—	MPC · JPL
2014 XS_{3}	71.97	0.955	101.5	TNO	✓	−0.368	✓	3.26	140.67	unusual	—	MPC · JPL
2015 AO_{44}	21.94	0.835	139.9	CEN	✓	−1.491	✓	3.62	40.26	unusual	—	MPC · JPL
2015 AM_{107}	12.79	0.875	7.1	CEN	—	1.916	✓	1.61	23.97	—	—	MPC · JPL
2015 BH_{311}	8.66	0.712	94.4	CEN	✓	0.462	✓	2.49	14.83	unusual	—	MPC · JPL
2015 BE_{384}	9.35	0.808	0.3	CEN	—	2.136	—	1.8	16.91	—	—	MPC · JPL
2015 BH_{526}	16.73	0.877	8.3	CEN	—	2.013	—	2.05	31.4	—	—	MPC · JPL
2015 EV_{45}	23.96	0.928	7.2	CEN	—	1.800	✓	1.72	46.2	—	—	MPC · JPL
2015 FK_{37}	456.59	0.989	156.1	TNO	✓	−2.506	✓	4.96	908.23	unusual	—	MPC · JPL
2015 KJ_{87}	11.98	0.886	8.2	CEN	—	1.828	✓	1.37	22.58	—	—	MPC · JPL
2015 RK_{245}	80.6	0.966	91.7	TNO	✓	0.002	✓	2.76	158.45	unusual	—	MPC · JPL
2015 RE_{277}	20.2	0.764	1.6	CEN	—	2.797	—	4.76	35.64	unusual	—	MPC · JPL
2015 TP_{10}	14.21	0.902	37.9	CEN	—	1.492	✓	1.39	27.03	—	—	MPC · JPL
2015 TN_{178}	54.15	0.956	91.2	TNO	✓	0.057	✓	2.39	105.91	unusual	—	MPC · JPL
2015 TN_{239}	14.52	0.882	14.1	CEN	—	1.886	✓	1.72	27.32	—	—	MPC · JPL
2015 TM_{240}	8.07	0.836	10.5	CEN	—	1.989	✓	1.32	14.82	—	—	MPC · JPL
2015 TV_{275}	10.93	0.805	13.4	CEN	—	2.150	—	2.13	19.73	—	—	MPC · JPL
2015 TS_{350}	144.42	0.965	58	TNO	—	1.501	✓	5.05	283.78	unusual	—	MPC · JPL
2015 XX_{351}	14.47	0.853	159.2	CEN	✓	−1.267	✓	2.13	26.81	unusual	—	MPC · JPL
2015 XR_{384}	36.44	0.902	157.5	TNO	✓	−1.967	✓	3.57	69.32	unusual	—	MPC · JPL
2015 YY_{18}	19.35	0.83	118.2	CEN	✓	−0.748	✓	3.28	35.42	unusual	—	MPC · JPL
2016 AT_{281}	63.07	0.957	22.2	TNO	—	1.945	✓	2.69	123.45	unusual	—	MPC · JPL
(762535) 2016 CD_{93}	29.1	0.936	12.2	CEN	—	1.810	✓	1.87	56.32	—	—	MPC · JPL
2016 CO_{264}	47.63	0.937	129.7	TNO	✓	−1.245	✓	3.01	92.25	unusual	—	MPC · JPL
2016 DF_{2}	7.2	0.538	167.1	CEN	✓	−1.209	✓	3.32	11.07	unusual	—	MPC · JPL
2016 EJ_{203}	66.61	0.959	171	TNO	✓	−1.922	✓	2.72	130.49	unusual	—	MPC · JPL
2016 GE_{53}	10.77	0.875	0.6	CEN	—	1.877	✓	1.35	20.19	—	—	MPC · JPL
2016 GF_{70}	21.02	0.935	14.1	CEN	—	1.633	✓	1.37	40.67	—	—	MPC · JPL
2016 GV_{83}	23.25	0.938	11.8	CEN	—	1.657	✓	1.44	45.06	—	—	MPC · JPL
2016 GE_{93}	13.78	0.918	17.2	NEO	—	1.614	✓	1.14	26.42	—	—	MPC · JPL
2016 GZ_{120}	10.72	0.831	10.5	CEN	—	2.054	—	1.81	19.63	—	—	MPC · JPL
(771532) 2016 JK_{24}	13.03	0.66	152.3	CEN	✓	−1.706	✓	4.43	21.63	—	—	MPC · JPL
2016 LS	13.34	0.606	114.3	CEN	✓	−0.660	✓	5.26	21.42	unusual	—	MPC · JPL
2016 NL_{100}	13.9	0.76	21.9	CEN	—	2.344	—	3.33	24.46	unusual	—	MPC · JPL
2016 PN_{66}	31.02	0.906	105.2	TNO	✓	−0.373	✓	2.9	59.13	unusual	—	MPC · JPL
(677092) 2016 SP_{6}	8.54	0.828	4.9	CEN	—	2.040	—	1.47	15.61	—	LoMP	MPC · JPL
2016 TK_{2}	9.2	0.551	92.4	CEN	✓	0.475	✓	4.13	14.27	unusual	—	MPC · JPL
2016 TP_{93}	7.39	0.554	138.3	CEN	✓	−0.778	✓	3.3	11.49	unusual	—	MPC · JPL
2016 US_{109}	35.69	0.948	87.2	TNO	—	0.226	✓	1.85	69.52	—	—	MPC · JPL
2016 UA_{140}	3.61	0.526	117.8	MBA	✓	0.780	✓	1.71	5.51	—	—	MPC · JPL
2016 UK_{212}	29.62	0.95	2.3	CEN	—	1.662	✓	1.48	57.77	—	—	MPC · JPL
2016 UN_{232}	30.39	0.862	11.2	TNO	—	2.576	—	4.2	56.59	—	—	MPC · JPL
2016 UN_{233}	24.86	0.937	1.4	CEN	—	1.741	✓	1.58	48.14	—	—	MPC · JPL
2016 UG_{245}	8.47	0.83	2.3	CEN	—	2.036	—	1.44	15.5	—	—	MPC · JPL
(717620) 2016 VH_{12}	10.3	0.834	4.6	CEN	—	2.051	—	1.7	18.89	—	—	MPC · JPL
2016 VY_{17}	11.15	0.85	148.5	CEN	✓	−0.847	✓	1.67	20.62	unusual	—	MPC · JPL
2016 WS_{1}	14.35	0.882	53	CEN	—	1.304	✓	1.69	27	unusual	—	MPC · JPL
2016 XK_{3}	10.29	0.81	34.4	CEN	—	1.868	✓	1.96	18.63	—	—	MPC · JPL
2016 YB_{13}	5.45	0.407	139.8	other	✓	−0.474	✓	3.24	7.67	—	—	MPC · JPL
2017 AX_{13}	28.69	0.883	137.2	CEN	✓	−1.435	✓	3.35	54.03	unusual	—	MPC · JPL
2017 BA_{48}	17.57	0.904	19.9	CEN	—	1.776	✓	1.69	33.45	—	—	MPC · JPL
2017 CW_{32}	186.35	0.984	152.4	TNO	✓	−1.852	✓	2.95	369.75	unusual	—	MPC · JPL
(807013) 2017 DQ_{106}	24.65	0.946	11.2	CEN	—	1.596	✓	1.33	47.97	—	—	MPC · JPL
2017 EM_{4}	33.15	0.92	83.4	TNO	—	0.383	✓	2.64	63.66	—	—	MPC · JPL
2017 GD_{8}	43.25	0.947	74.9	TNO	—	0.603	✓	2.29	84.22	unusual	—	MPC · JPL
2017 JB_{6}	32.78	0.883	160.9	TNO	✓	−2.063	✓	3.82	61.74	unusual	—	MPC · JPL
2017 MZ_{4}	67.32	0.953	65.8	TNO	—	0.974	✓	3.19	131.45	unusual	—	MPC · JPL
2017 MB7	1311.87	0.997	55.8	TNO	—	1.475	✓	4.46	2619.28	unusual	—	MPC · JPL
2017 NM_{2}	14.6	0.622	101.3	CEN	✓	−0.156	✓	5.52	23.67	—	—	MPC · JPL
2017 OX_{68}	58.9	0.971	94.8	TNO	✓	−0.046	✓	1.73	116.07	unusual	—	MPC · JPL
2017 PY_{24}	17.38	0.925	71.8	CEN	—	0.733	✓	1.31	33.44	—	—	MPC · JPL
(606187) 2017 QO_{33}	34.55	0.857	148.8	TNO	✓	−2.121	✓	4.94	64.16	unusual	LoMP	MPC · JPL
2017 QW_{46}	9.02	0.801	5.1	CEN	—	2.147	—	1.79	16.25	—	—	MPC · JPL
2017 RR_{2}	11.62	0.782	87.1	CEN	—	0.542	✓	2.53	20.71	unusual	—	MPC · JPL
2017 SV13	9.66	0.792	113.3	CEN	✓	−0.119	✓	2.01	17.3	unusual	—	MPC · JPL
2017 SN_{33}	239.43	0.992	152.1	TNO	✓	−1.464	✓	1.85	477.02	unusual	—	MPC · JPL
2017 SZ_{118}	34.08	0.954	2.5	TNO	—	1.684	✓	1.56	66.6	—	—	MPC · JPL
2017 UW_{51}	125.75	0.975	144.2	TNO	✓	−1.729	✓	3.14	248.36	unusual	—	MPC · JPL
2017 UX_{51}	30.06	0.747	90.5	CEN	✓	0.147	✓	7.61	52.5	—	—	MPC · JPL
2017 UR_{52}	317.81	0.996	108.3	NEO	✓	−0.416	✓	1.24	634.38	—	—	MPC · JPL
2017 YL_{2}	8.92	0.766	27.9	CEN	—	2.072	—	2.09	15.76	unusual	—	MPC · JPL
2017 YL_{4}	152.42	0.972	89	TNO	—	0.080	✓	4.26	300.57	unusual	—	MPC · JPL
2018 AS_{18}	12.93	0.872	63	CEN	—	1.105	✓	1.66	24.21	—	—	MPC · JPL
2018 DE_{4}	32	0.925	81.3	TNO	—	0.446	✓	2.39	61.62	unusual	—	MPC · JPL
2018 DF_{4}	95.81	0.983	68.2	TNO	—	0.635	✓	1.6	190.02	—	—	MPC · JPL
2018 KH_{3}	93.93	0.961	46.9	TNO	—	1.672	✓	3.71	184.15	unusual	—	MPC · JPL
2018 MP_{8}	370.07	0.99	68.3	TNO	—	0.909	✓	3.83	736.31	unusual	—	MPC · JPL
2018 PQ_{18}	8.95	0.808	1.2	CEN	—	2.127	—	1.72	16.19	—	—	MPC · JPL
2018 PL_{28}	19.51	0.862	74.1	CEN	—	0.804	✓	2.69	36.33	unusual	—	MPC · JPL
2018 SQ_{13}	154.08	0.981	91	TNO	✓	−0.002	✓	2.97	305.19	unusual	—	MPC · JPL
2018 TL_{6}	8.15	0.788	170.9	CEN	✓	−0.881	✓	1.72	14.57	unusual	—	MPC · JPL
A/2018 V3	121.44	0.989	165	TNO	✓	−1.339	✓	1.34	241.54	—	—	MPC · JPL
2018 WB_{1}	7.25	0.694	152.3	CEN	✓	−0.787	✓	2.22	12.27	unusual	—	MPC · JPL
(594872) 2019 CR	14.46	0.594	160.3	CEN	✓	−2.166	✓	5.87	23.04	—	LoMP	MPC · JPL
2019 EJ_{3}	24.2	0.956	139.6	NEO	✓	−0.754	✓	1.08	47.32	—	—	MPC · JPL
A/2019 G2	699.85	0.997	159.2	TNO	✓	−1.746	✓	2.29	1397.41	—	—	MPC · JPL
A/2019 G3	17.15	0.834	156.8	CEN	✓	−1.540	✓	2.85	31.45	—	—	MPC · JPL
2019 HC_{4}	8.79	0.555	134.3	CEN	✓	−0.918	✓	3.91	13.66	unusual	—	MPC · JPL
2019 KE_{7}	11.67	0.702	108.3	CEN	✓	−0.224	✓	3.48	19.86	unusual	—	MPC · JPL
2019 KN_{19}	12.42	0.765	14.8	CEN	—	2.342	—	2.91	21.93	—	—	MPC · JPL
A/2019 O2	57.37	0.831	93.3	TNO	✓	−0.121	✓	9.68	105.05	—	—	MPC · JPL
A/2019 O4	32.88	0.889	115.1	TNO	✓	−0.817	✓	3.64	62.12	—	—	MPC · JPL
2019 PN_{2}	25.11	0.92	113	CEN	✓	−0.465	✓	2.01	48.22	unusual	—	MPC · JPL
A/2019 Q2	59.68	0.979	159	NEO	✓	−1.205	✓	1.26	118.11	—	—	MPC · JPL
A/2019 T1	38.24	0.888	120.9	TNO	✓	−1.143	✓	4.28	72.2	—	—	MPC · JPL
2019 YJ_{6}	37.39	0.931	22	TNO	—	1.948	✓	2.56	72.22	unusual	—	MPC · JPL
A/2020 A1	25.94	0.936	149	CEN	✓	−1.152	✓	1.67	50.2	—	—	MPC · JPL
A/2020 B1	52.32	0.967	18.5	TNO	—	1.641	✓	1.75	102.88	—	—	MPC · JPL
2020 BZ_{12}	7.69	0.922	165.5	NEO	✓	−0.237	✓	0.6	14.79	—	—	MPC · JPL
2020 EP	10.5	0.764	76.4	CEN	—	0.927	✓	2.48	18.51	unusual	—	MPC · JPL
2020 FH_{24}	14.4	0.773	28.6	CEN	—	2.216	—	3.27	25.52	unusual	—	MPC · JPL
A/2020 H9	341.71	0.992	137.9	TNO	✓	−1.458	✓	2.58	680.84	—	—	MPC · JPL
2020 HB_{11}	16.6	0.709	147.3	CEN	✓	−1.808	✓	4.84	28.36	unusual	—	MPC · JPL
2020 KD_{6}	13.07	0.872	38.7	CEN	—	1.612	✓	1.68	24.47	unusual	—	MPC · JPL
2020 KH_{7}	7.94	0.502	106.1	CEN	✓	0.061	✓	3.95	11.94	unusual	—	MPC · JPL
2020 KU_{7}	34.88	0.88	103.8	TNO	✓	−0.440	✓	4.2	65.57	unusual	—	MPC · JPL
2020 ML_{1}	56.08	0.955	82.5	TNO	—	0.349	✓	2.54	109.62	unusual	—	MPC · JPL
A/2020 M4	5092.51	0.999	160.1	TNO	✓	−2.843	✓	5.95	10179.07	—	—	MPC · JPL
2020 OR_{5}	6.24	0.376	166.6	CEN	✓	−1.139	✓	3.89	8.58	unusual	—	MPC · JPL
2020 OS_{5}	6.9	0.684	155.8	CEN	✓	−0.779	✓	2.18	11.63	unusual	—	MPC · JPL
2020 OP_{7}	28.37	0.894	79.5	CEN	—	0.565	✓	3	53.75	unusual	—	MPC · JPL
2020 QN_{6}	674.79	0.993	76.8	TNO	—	0.627	✓	4.82	1344.75	unusual	—	MPC · JPL
2020 QO_{6}	19.13	0.875	80.5	CEN	—	0.579	✓	2.39	35.88	—	—	MPC · JPL
2020 SJ_{5}	18.18	0.856	77.4	CEN	—	0.709	✓	2.62	33.74	unusual	—	MPC · JPL
2020 SV_{79}	17.52	0.884	5.7	CEN	—	2.003	—	2.03	33.02	unusual	—	MPC · JPL
2020 TK_{9}	20.44	0.878	105.6	CEN	✓	−0.254	✓	2.49	38.4	unusual	—	MPC · JPL
2020 VS_{6}	7.73	0.773	161.2	CEN	✓	−0.791	✓	1.75	13.71	unusual	—	MPC · JPL
2020 XQ_{7}	23.54	0.918	32.5	CEN	—	1.647	✓	1.94	45.14	—	—	MPC · JPL
(773721) 2020 YR3	501.83	0.967	169.3	TNO	✓	−4.896	✓	16.49	987.16	—	—	MPC · JPL
2021 CT_{3}	7.6	0.435	160.4	CEN	✓	−1.366	✓	4.29	10.91	unusual	—	MPC · JPL
2021 DL_{1}	35.41	0.889	148.6	TNO	✓	−1.892	✓	3.93	66.88	unusual	—	MPC · JPL
2021 DN_{2}	22.12	0.82	10.8	CEN	—	2.555	—	3.99	40.25	unusual	—	MPC · JPL
A/2021 E2	216.27	0.989	167.5	TNO	✓	−1.802	✓	2.29	430.26	—	—	MPC · JPL
A/2021 E4	733.1	0.994	116.4	TNO	✓	−1.181	✓	4.68	1461.53	—	—	MPC · JPL
2021 FQ_{2}	10.81	0.792	54.9	CEN	—	1.492	✓	2.24	19.37	—	—	MPC · JPL
2021 GQ_{57}	86.21	0.96	125.1	TNO	✓	−1.252	✓	3.46	168.96	unusual	—	MPC · JPL
2021 KL_{9}	24.64	0.944	2.3	CEN	—	1.652	✓	1.39	47.89	—	—	MPC · JPL
2021 LB_{18}	25.64	0.869	129	CEN	✓	−1.179	✓	3.36	47.92	—	—	MPC · JPL
2021 NX_{7}	8.412	0.5885	63.78	CEN	—	1.53	✓	3.461	13.36	unusual	—	MPC · JPL
2021 PD	6.322	0.6159	71.35	CEN	—	1.38	✓	2.428	10.22	unusual	—	MPC · JPL
2021 PN_{72}	321.1	0.9859	84.79	TNO	—	0.255	✓	4.524	637.62	unusual	—	MPC · JPL
2021 RM_{114}	105.8	0.9619	103.18	TNO	✓	−0.513	✓	4.025	207.49	unusual	—	MPC · JPL
Designation	a (AU)	e	i (°)	Orbital criteria and classes				q (AU)	Q (AU)	Unusual	Catalog	Refs
Designation	a (AU)	e	i (°)	Cls	Retro	T_{Jupiter}	T_{J} ≤ 2	q (AU)	Q (AU)	Unusual	Catalog	Refs

back to top

== See also ==
- Extinct comet
- List of centaurs (small Solar System bodies)
