= Extinct comet =

Comet that lacks typical activity

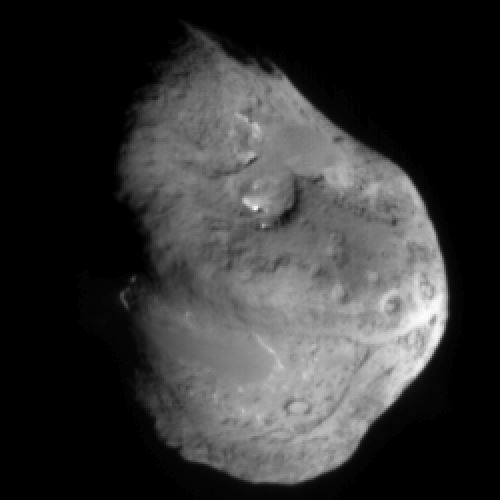
Comet nucleus of 9P/Tempel as imaged by the NASA Deep Impact space probe. This is not yet extinct, but gives some idea of a cometary nucleus.

An extinct comet is a comet that has expelled most of its volatile ice and has little left to form a tail and coma. In a dormant comet, rather than being depleted, any remaining volatile components have been sealed beneath an inactive surface layer.

Due to the near lack of a coma and tail, an extinct or dormant comet may resemble an asteroid rather than a comet and blur the distinction between these two classes of small Solar System bodies. When volatile materials such as nitrogen, water, carbon dioxide, ammonia, hydrogen and methane in the comet nucleus have evaporated away, all that remains is an inert rock or rubble pile. A comet may go through a transition phase as it comes close to extinction.

== Nature of extinct comets ==
Over time, most of the volatile material contained in a comet nucleus evaporates away, and the comet becomes a small, dark, inert lump of rock or rubble that can resemble an asteroid.

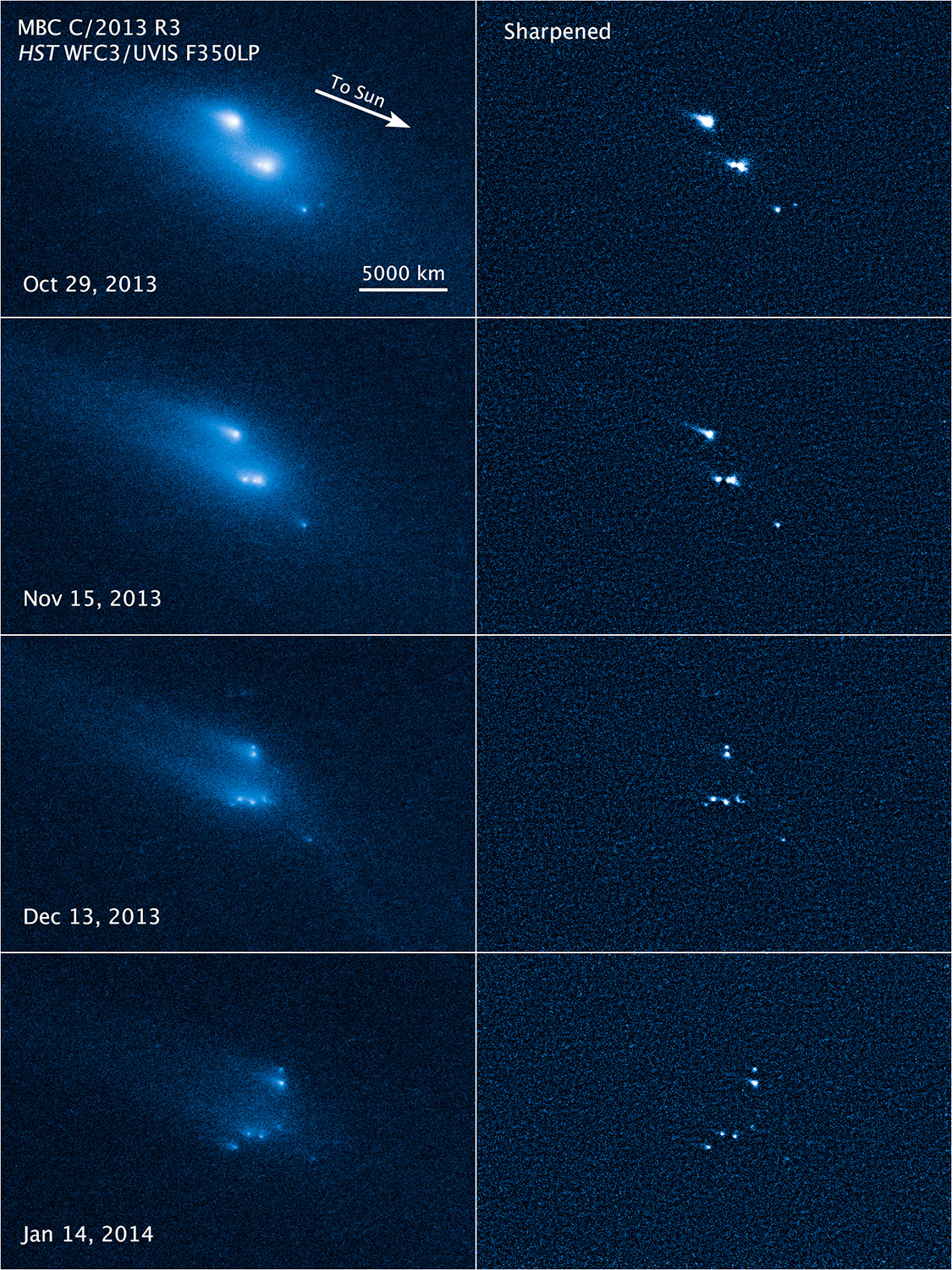
Disintegration of asteroid P/2013 R3 observed by the Hubble Space Telescope between late-October 2013 and early-January 2014.

Other related types of comet include transition comets, that are close to becoming extinct, such as were looked for in the Hubble search for transition comets. Comets such as C/2001 OG108 (LONEOS) may represent the transition between extinct comets and typical Halley-type comets (periods of 20–200 years) or long period comets (periods longer than 200 years). Minor planets of the group of damocloids have been studied as possible extinct cometary candidates due to the similarity of their orbital parameters with those of Halley-type comets.

=== Dormant comets ===
Dormant comets are those within which volatiles may be sealed, but which have inactive surfaces. For example, 14827 Hypnos may be the nucleus of an extinct comet that is covered by a crust several centimeters thick that prevents any remaining volatiles from outgassing.

The term dormant comet is also used to describe comets that may become active but are not actively outgassing. For example, 60558 Echeclus has previously displayed a cometary coma and thus also has been given the cometary designation 174P/Echeclus. After passing perihelion in early 2008, centaur 52872 Okyrhoe significantly brightened.

== Distinction between comets and asteroids ==
When discovered, asteroids were seen as a class of objects distinct from comets, and there was no unified term for the two until "small Solar System body" was coined by the IAU in 2006. The main difference between an asteroid and a comet is that a comet shows a coma due to sublimation of near-surface ices by solar radiation. A few objects have ended up being dual-listed because they were first classified as minor planets but later showed evidence of cometary activity. Conversely, some (perhaps all) comets are eventually depleted of their surface volatile ices and develop the appearance of asteroids. A further distinction is that comets typically have more eccentric orbits than most asteroids; most "asteroids" with notably eccentric orbits are probably dormant or extinct comets. Also, they are theorized to be common objects amongst the celestial bodies orbiting close to the Sun.

Roughly six percent of the near-Earth asteroids are thought to be extinct nuclei of comets which no longer experience outgassing.

== Extinct comets ==
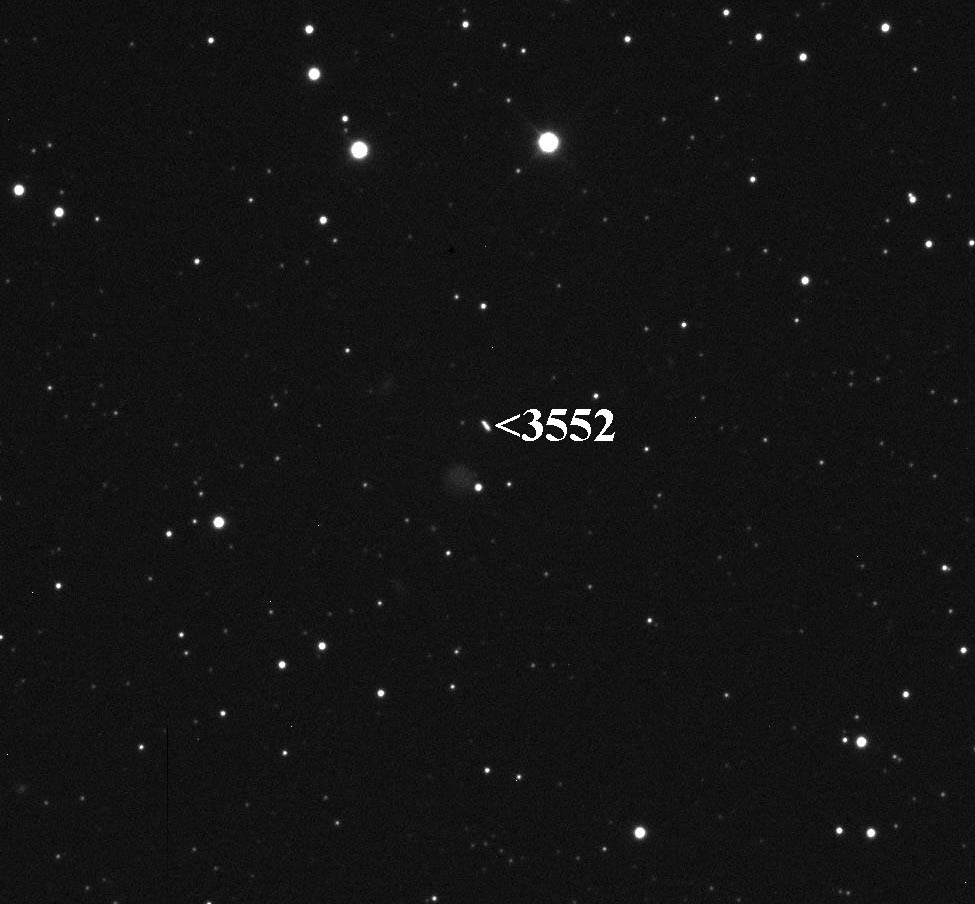
Don Quixote (apmag 15) near perihelion in 2009.

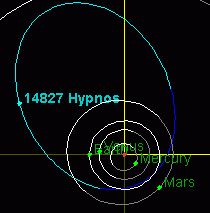
The eccentric (e=0.66) comet-like orbit of Hypnos.

Suspected or hypothesized extinct comets include:

- (137924) 2000 BD19
- 14827 Hypnos
- 2101 Adonis
- 2015 TB145
- (196256) 2003 EH1
- 3200 Phaethon
- 3552 Don Quixote
- P/2007 R5 (SOHO 1)
- 1996 PW possibly an extinct long-period comet

== See also ==
- Centaur (minor planet)
- Damocloid asteroid
- List of minor planets and comets visited by spacecraft
- Lost comet
