= Distant minor planet =

Minor planets orbiting in the outer Solar system beyond Jupiter

A distant minor planet, or distant object, is any minor planet found beyond Jupiter in the outer Solar System that is not commonly thought of as an "asteroid". The umbrella term is used by IAU's Minor Planet Center (MPC), which is responsible for the identification, designation and orbit computation of these objects. As of January 2025, the MPC maintains 6101 distant objects in its data base.

Most distant minor planets are trans-Neptunian objects and centaurs, while relatively few are damocloids, Neptune trojans or Uranus trojans. All distant objects have a semi-major axis (average distance from the Sun) greater than 6 AU. This threshold, which is just beyond the orbit of Jupiter (5.2 AU), ensures that the vast majority of "true asteroids" – such as the near-Earth, Mars-crosser, main-belt and Jupiter trojan populations – are excluded from the distant minor planets.

== See also ==
- Critical-list minor planet
- Unusual minor planet
