= List of exceptional asteroids =

VLT/SPHERE images of most asteroids > 210 km in diameter to scale. Deconvolved with MISTRAL algorithm. Main-belt asteroids > 200 km that were not imaged are (451) Patientia, (65) Cybele and (107) Camilla. Trojan (624) Hektor may also be in this size range.

VLT/SPHERE images of a large number of asteroids 100 to 210 km in diameter, to scale. (10) Hygiea, (31) Euphrosyne and (8) Flora have collisional families; all three are round due to having re-coalesced after being disrupted.

The following is a collection of lists of asteroids of the Solar System that are exceptional in some way, such as their size or orbit. For the purposes of this article, "asteroid" refers to minor planets out to the orbit of Neptune, and includes the dwarf planet Ceres, the Jupiter trojans and the centaurs, but not trans-Neptunian objects (objects in the Kuiper belt, scattered disc or inner Oort cloud). For a complete list of minor planets in numerical order, see List of minor planets.

Asteroids are given minor planet numbers, but not all minor planets are asteroids. Minor planet numbers are also given to objects of the Kuiper belt, which is similar to the asteroid belt but farther out (around 30–60 AU). Asteroids are mostly between 2–3 AU from the Sun or at the orbit of Jupiter, 5 AU from the Sun. Comets are not typically included under minor planet numbers, and have their own naming conventions.

Asteroids are given a unique sequential identifying number once their orbit is precisely determined. Prior to this, they are known only by their systematic name or provisional designation, such as 1950 DA.

== Physical characteristics ==
=== Largest by diameter ===
Estimating the sizes of asteroids from observations is difficult due to their irregular shapes, varying albedo, and small angular diameter. Observations by the Very Large Telescope of most large asteroids were published 2019–2021.

Name	Picture	Diameter (km) (geometric mean)	Dimensions (km)	Mean distance from Sun (in AU)	Inclination (°)	Date discovered	Discoverer	Class
1 Ceres		939.4±0.2	964.4 × 964.2 × 891.8	2.766	10.6	January 1, 1801	Piazzi, G.	G
4 Vesta		525.4±0.2	572.6 × 557.2 × 446.4 ± 0.2	2.362	7.14	March 29, 1807	Olbers, H. W.	V
2 Pallas		511±4	568×530×450	2.773	34.9	March 28, 1802	Olbers, H. W.	B
10 Hygiea		433±8	450×430×424	3.139	5.1	April 12, 1849	de Gasparis, A.	C
704 Interamnia		332±5	362×348×310	3.062	17.3	October 2, 1910	Cerulli, V.	F
52 Europa		319±4	378×336×255	3.095	7.48	February 4, 1858	Goldschmidt, H.	C
511 Davida		298±4	359×293×253	3.168	15.9	May 30, 1903	Dugan, R. S.	C
87 Sylvia		271±5	363×249×191 or 374×248×194	3.485	10.9	May 16, 1866	Pogson, N. R.	X
15 Eunomia		270±3	357×255×212	2.643	11.75	July 29, 1851	de Gasparis, A.	S
31 Euphrosyne		268±4	294×280×248	3.149	26.3	September 1, 1854	Ferguson, J.	C
65 Cybele		263±3	297 × 291 × 213	3.439	3.56	March 8, 1861	Tempel, E. W.	C
624 Hektor		256±12 (if bilobe)	403 × 201	5.235	18.66	February 10, 1907	Kopff, A.	D
3 Juno		254±2	288×250×225	2.672	12.98	September 1, 1804	Harding, K. L.	S
451 Patientia		254±3		3.059	15.2	December 4, 1899	Charlois, A.	
107 Camilla		254±12		3.476	10	November 17, 1868	Pogson, N. R.	C
324 Bamberga		227±3	234×224×225	2.684	11.1	February 25, 1892	Palisa, J.	C
16 Psyche		223±3	279×232×189 ± 10%	2.924	3.1	March 17, 1852	de Gasparis, A.	M
88 Thisbe		218±3	255×232×193	2.769	5.22	June 15, 1866	Peters, C. H. F.	B
48 Doris		215±3	257×211×185	3.108	6.55	September 19, 1857	Goldschmidt, H.	C
19 Fortuna		211±2	225×205×195	2.442	1.57	August 22, 1852	Hind, J. R.	G
121 Hermione		209±5?		3.457	7.6	May 12, 1872	Watson, J. C.	C
24 Themis		208±3	232×220×176	3.136	0.76	April 5, 1853	de Gasparis, A.	C
94 Aurora		205±4 ? (< 200 km)	225×173	3.160	7.97	September 6, 1867	Watson, J. C.	C
29 Amphitrite		204±2	222×209×183	2.554	6.08	March 1, 1854	Marth, A.	S
13 Egeria		202±3	238×199×182	2.576	16.54	November 2, 1850	de Gasparis, A.	G
130 Elektra		199±2	262×205×164	3.127	22.78	February 17, 1873	C. H. F. Peters	C
7 Iris		199±10	268×234×180	2.386	5.52	August 13, 1847	Hind, J. R.	S
6 Hebe		195±3	205x185x170	2.426	14.75	July 1, 1847	Hencke, K. L.	S
375 Ursula		192±4		3.126	15.94	September 18, 1893	Charlois, A.	C
702 Alauda		191±2		3.195	20.59	July 16, 1910	Helffrich, J.	C/B
45 Eugenia		188±2	252×191×138	2.720	6.61	June 27, 1857	Goldschmidt, H.	F
41 Daphne		187±13	235×183×153	2.765	15.77	May 22, 1856	Goldschmidt, H.	C
154 Bertha		186±2		3.195	20.972	November 4, 1875	Henry, P. M.	C
423 Diotima		176±4		3.065	11.23	December 7, 1896	Charlois, A.	C
259 Aletheia		174±1		3.135	10.81	June 28, 1886	Peters, C. H. F.	C/P/X
372 Palma		174±3		3.149	23.83	August 19, 1893	Charlois, A.	B
9 Metis		173±2	222×182×130	2.385	5.58	April 25, 1848	Graham, A.	S
532 Herculina		168±1		2.772	16.31	April 20, 1904	Wolf, M.	S
354 Eleonora		165±3	191×162×144	2.798	18.4	January 17, 1893	Auguste Charlois	S
128 Nemesis		163±5	178×163×147	2.751	6.25	November 25, 1872	Watson, J. C.	C
(4:1 resonance) [sort by 'Mean Distance from Sun' to place in table]				2.06	(defines inner edge of main belt)			
(3:1 resonance)				2.50	(separates inner from middle belt)			
(5:2 resonance)				2.82	(separates middle from outer belt)			
(7:3 resonance)				2.95				
(2:1 resonance)				3.27	(defines outermost belt)			
(1:1 resonance)				5.20	(Trojan asteroids – defines outer edge of main belt)			

The number of bodies grows rapidly as the size decreases. Based on IRAS data there are about 140 main-belt asteroids with a diameter greater than 120 km, which is approximately the transition point between surviving primordial asteroids and fragments thereof. For a more complete list, see List of Solar System objects by size.

The inner asteroid belt (defined as the region interior to the 3:1 Kirkwood gap at 2.50 AU) has few large asteroids. Of those in the above list, only 4 Vesta, 19 Fortuna, 6 Hebe, 7 Iris and 9 Metis orbit there. (Sort table by mean distance.)

=== Most massive ===
Below are the sixteen most-massive measured asteroids. Ceres, at a third the estimated mass of the asteroid belt, is half again as massive as the next fifteen put together. The masses of asteroids are estimated from perturbations they induce on the orbits of other asteroids, except for asteroids that have been visited by spacecraft or have an observable moon, where a direct mass calculation is possible. Different sets of astrometric observations lead to different mass determinations; the biggest problem is accounting for the aggregate perturbations caused by all of the smaller asteroids.

Comparative masses of the asteroids with nominal masses > 20×10^{18} kg.
1. Ceres 938 (39.2%)
2. Vesta 259 (10.8%)
3. Pallas 204 (8.52%)
4. Hygiea 87 (3.64%)
5. Interamnia 35 (1.46%)
6. Eunomia 30 (1.25%)
7. Juno 27 (1.13%)
8. Davida 27 (1.13%)
9. Europa 24 (1.00%)
10. Psyche 23 (0.96%)
11. Herculina 23 (0.96%)
12. other 716 (29.9%)

Asteroids with nominal mass > 10×10^{18} kg
Name	Mass (×10^{18} kg)	Precision	Approx. proportion of all asteroids
1 Ceres	938.35	0.001% (938.34–938.36)	39.2%
4 Vesta	259.076	0.0004% (259.075–259.077)	10.8%
2 Pallas	204	1.5% (201–207)	8.5%
10 Hygiea	87	8% (80–94)	3.6%
704 Interamnia	35	14% (30–40)	1.5%
15 Eunomia	30	6% (29–32)	1.3%
3 Juno	27	9% (25–29)	1.1%
511 Davida	27	27% (19–34)	1.1%
52 Europa	24	16% (20–28)	1.0%
16 Psyche	23	13% (20–26)	1.0%
532 Herculina	≈ 23	?	≈ 1%
31 Euphrosyne	17	18% (14–19)	0.7%
65 Cybele	15	12% (13–17)	0.6%
87 Sylvia	14.76	0.4% (14.70–14.82)	0.6%
7 Iris	14	17% (11–16)	0.6%
29 Amphitrite	13	16% (11–15)	0.5%
6 Hebe	12	20% (10–15)	0.5%
88 Thisbe	12	20% (9–14)	0.5%
107 Camilla	11.2	1% (11.1–11.3)	0.5%
324 Bamberga	10	9% (9–11)	0.4%
Total	1781	NA	75%

The proportions assume that the total mass of the asteroid belt is 2.39×10^{21} kg, or (12.4±1.0)×10^{−10} M_{☉}.

Outside the top four, the ranking of all the asteroids is uncertain, as there is a great deal of overlap among the estimates.

The largest asteroids with an accurately measured mass, because they have been studied by the probe Dawn, are 1 Ceres with a mass of (939.3±0.5)×10^{18} kg, and 4 Vesta at (259.076±0.001)×10^{18} kg. The third-largest asteroid with an accurately measured mass, because it has moons, is 87 Sylvia at (14.76±0.06)×10^{18} kg. Other large asteroids with masses measured from their moons are 107 Camilla and 130 Elektra.

For a more complete list, see List of Solar System objects by size. Other large asteroids such as 423 Diotima currently only have estimated masses.

=== Brightest from Earth ===
Only Vesta is regularly bright enough to be seen with the naked eye. Under ideal viewing conditions with very dark skies, a keen eye might be able to also see Ceres, as well as Pallas and Iris at their rare perihelic oppositions. The following asteroids can all reach an apparent magnitude brighter than or equal to the +8.3 attained by Saturn's moon Titan at its brightest, which was discovered 145 years before the first asteroid was found owing to its closeness to the easily observed Saturn.

None of the asteroids in the outer part of the asteroid belt can ever attain this brightness. Even Hygiea and Interamnia rarely reach magnitudes of above 10.0. This is due to the different distributions of spectral types within different sections of the asteroid belt: the highest-albedo asteroids are all concentrated closer to the orbit of Mars, and much lower albedo C and D types are common in the outer belt.

Those asteroids with very high eccentricities will only reach their maximum magnitude rarely, when their perihelion is very close to a heliocentric conjunction with Earth, or (in the cases of 433 Eros, 99942 Apophis, (152680) 1998 KJ9, (153814) 2001 WN5, and 367943 Duende) when the asteroid passes very close to Earth.

Asteroid	Magnitude when brightest	Semi- major axis (AU)	Eccentricity of orbit	Diameter (km)	Year of discovery
99942 Apophis	3.4^{*}	0.922	0.191	0.32	2004
4 Vesta	5.20	2.361	0.089172	529	1807
2 Pallas	6.49	2.773	0.230725	544	1802
1 Ceres	6.65	2.766	0.079905	952	1801
7 Iris	6.73	2.385	0.231422	200	1847
433 Eros	6.8	1.458	0.222725	34 × 11 × 11	1898
(153814) 2001 WN5	6.85	1.711	0.467207	0.93	2001
367943 Duende	7.04	0.910	0.089319	0.04 × 0.02	2012
6 Hebe	7.5	2.425	0.201726	186	1847
3 Juno	7.5	2.668	0.258194	233	1804
18 Melpomene	7.5	2.296	0.218708	141	1852
(152680) 1998 KJ9	7.74	1.448	0.639770	0.5	1998
15 Eunomia	7.9	2.643	0.187181	268	1851
8 Flora	7.9	2.202	0.156207	128	1847
324 Bamberga	8.0	2.682	0.338252	229	1892
1036 Ganymed	8.1	2.6657	0.533710	32	1924
9 Metis	8.1	2.387	0.121441	190	1848
192 Nausikaa	8.2	2.404	0.246216	103	1879
20 Massalia	8.3	2.409	0.142880	145	1852

* Apophis will only achieve that brightness on April 13, 2029. It typically has an apparent magnitude of 20–22.

=== Slowest rotators ===
This list contains the slowest-rotating known minor planets with a period of at least 1000 hours, or 41 2/3 days, while most bodies have rotation periods between 2 and 20 hours. Also see Potentially slow rotators for minor planets with an insufficiently accurate period (U < 2).

#	Minor planet designation	Rotation period (hours)	Δmag	Quality (U)	Orbit or family	Spectral type	Diameter (km)	Abs. mag (H)	Refs
1.	(162058) 1997 AE12	1880	0.6	2	NEO	S	0.782	17.9	LCDB · List
2.	846 Lipperta	1641	0.30	2	Themis	CBU:	52.41	10.26	LCDB · List
3.	2440 Educatio	1561	0.80	2	Flora	S	6.51	13.1	LCDB · List
4.	912 Maritima	1332	0.18	3−	MBA (outer)	C	82.14	9.30	LCDB · List
5.	9165 Raup	1320	1.34	3−	Hungaria	S	4.62	13.60	LCDB · List
6.	1235 Schorria	1265	1.40	3	Hungaria	CX:	5.04	13.10	LCDB · List
7.	50719 Elizabethgriffin	1256	0.42	2	Eunomia	S	3.40	14.65	LCDB · List
8.	(75482) 1999 XC173	1234.2	0.69	2	Vestian	S	2.96	15.01	LCDB · List
9.	288 Glauke	1170	0.90	3	MBA (outer)	S	32.24	10.00	LCDB · List
10.	(39546) 1992 DT5	1167.4	0.80	2	MBA (outer)	C	5.34	15.09	LCDB · List
11.	496 Gryphia	1072	1.25	3	Flora	S	15.47	11.61	LCDB · List
12.	4524 Barklajdetolli	1069	1.26	2	Flora	S	7.14	12.90	LCDB · List
13.	2675 Tolkien	1060	0.75	2+	Flora	S	9.85	12.20	LCDB · List
14.	(219774) 2001 YY145	1007.7	0.86	2	MBA (inner)	S	1.54	16.43	LCDB · List

back to top

=== Fastest rotators ===
This list contains the fastest-rotating minor planets with a period of less than 100 seconds, or 0.0277 hours. Bodies with a highly uncertain period, having a quality of less than 2, are highlighted in dark-grey. The fastest rotating bodies are all unnumbered near-Earth objects (NEOs) with a diameter of less than 100 meters (see table).

Among the numbered minor planets with an unambiguous period solution are (459872) 2014 EK24, a 60-meter sized stony NEO with a period of 352 seconds, as well as (335433) 2005 UW163 and (60716) 2000 GD65, two main-belt asteroids, with a diameter of 0.86 and 2.25 kilometers and a period of 1.29 and 1.95 hours, respectively (see full list).

#	Minor planet designation	Rotation period		Δmag	Quality (U)	Orbit or family	Spectral type	Diameter (km)	Abs. mag (H)	Refs
#	Minor planet designation	(seconds)	(hours)	Δmag	Quality (U)	Orbit or family	Spectral type	Diameter (km)	Abs. mag (H)	Refs
1.	2014 RC	16	0.004389	0.10	n.a.	NEO	S	0.012	26.80	LCDB · MPC
2.	2015 SV_{6}	18	0.00490	0.74	2	NEO	S	0.009	27.70	LCDB · MPC
3.	2010 JL88	25	0.0068295	0.52	3	NEO	S	0.013	26.80	LCDB · MPC
4.	2017 EK	30	0.0083	0.30	2	NEO	S	0.045	24.10	LCDB · MPC
5.	2010 WA	31	0.0085799	0.22	3	NEO	S	0.003	30.00	LCDB · MPC
6.	2017 UK_{8}	31	0.0086309	1.30	3	NEO	S	0.007	28.20	LCDB · MPC
7.	2016 GE_{1}	34	0.009438	0.13	2	NEO	S	0.014	26.60	LCDB · MPC
8.	2008 HJ	43	0.01185	0.80	3−	NEO	S	0.021	25.80	LCDB · MPC
9.	2009 TM_{8}	43	0.012	–	n.a.	NEO	S	0.006	28.40	LCDB · MPC
10.	2015 SU	46	0.0127	0.20	2−	NEO	S	0.025	25.40	LCDB · MPC
11.	2010 SK_{13}	52	0.0144	–	n.a.	NEO	S	0.01	27.40	LCDB · MPC
12.	2009 BF_{2}	57	0.01593	0.80	3	NEO	S	0.02	25.90	LCDB · MPC
13.	2016 GS_{2}	66	0.0182725	0.06	1	NEO	S	0.075	23.00	LCDB · MPC
14.	2010 TG_{19}	70	0.0193935	1.10	3	NEO	S	0.049	23.90	LCDB · MPC
15.	2008 WA_{14}	70	0.0195	–	n.a.	NEO	S	0.075	23.00	LCDB · MPC
16.	2007 KE_{4}	77	0.021408	0.38	3−	NEO	S	0.027	25.20	LCDB · MPC
17.	2000 DO_{8}	78	0.0217	1.39	3	NEO	S	0.037	24.54	LCDB · MPC
18.	2014 GQ_{17}	78	0.0217	0.08	2−	NEO	S	0.011	27.10	LCDB · MPC
19.	2014 TV	79	0.02190	0.32	2	NEO	S	0.039	24.40	LCDB · MPC
20.	2000 WH_{10}	80	0.02221	0.66	3−	NEO	S	0.094	22.50	LCDB · MPC
21.	2012 HG_{2}	82	0.0227	–	n.a.	NEO	S	0.012	27.00	LCDB · MPC
22.	2010 TD54	83	0.0229317	0.92	3	NEO	S	0.005	28.90	LCDB · MPC
23.	2010 TS_{19}	83	0.023	–	n.a.	NEO	S	0.022	25.70	LCDB · MPC
24.	2009 UD	84	0.023246	0.66	2+	NEO	S	0.011	27.20	LCDB · MPC
25.	2014 WB_{366}	86	0.0238	0.46	2+	NEO	S	0.033	24.80	LCDB · MPC
26.	2015 RF_{36}	90	0.025	0.15	2	NEO	S	0.062	23.40	LCDB · MPC
27.	2015 AK_{45}	93	0.0258	0.24	2	NEO	S	0.016	26.40	LCDB · MPC
28.	2010 XE_{11}	96	0.0265846	0.50	3	NEO	S	0.075	23.00	LCDB · MPC
29.	2000 UK_{11}	96	0.026599	0.28	2	NEO	S	0.026	25.30	LCDB · MPC
30.	2016 RB_{1}	96	0.02674	0.18	2+	NEO	S	0.007	28.30	LCDB · MPC
31.	2015 CM	96	0.0268	0.53	3−	NEO	S	0.018	26.10	LCDB · MPC
32.	2008 TC3	97	0.0269409	1.02	3	NEO	F	0.004	30.90	LCDB · MPC

back to top

== Orbital characteristics ==
=== Retrograde ===
Minor planets with orbital inclinations near or greater than 90° (the greatest possible is 180°) orbit in a retrograde direction. As of March 2018, of the near-800,000 minor planets known, there are only 99 known retrograde minor planets (0.01% of total minor planets known). In comparison, there are over 2,000 comets with retrograde orbits. This makes retrograde minor planets the rarest group of all. High-inclination asteroids are either Mars-crossers (possibly in the process of being ejected from the Solar System) or damocloids. Some of these are temporarily captured in retrograde resonance with the gas giants.

Minor planet designation	Inclination (°)	First observed/ Discovery date	Condition code	Obs. × arc	Comment	Refs
2024 TF_{3}	89.1°	March 8, 2010		40	Extremely high-inclined trans-Neptunian object.	MPC
2017 UX_{51}	90.5°	October 27, 2017	0	79254	—	MPC
2018 SQ_{13}	90.9°	September 21, 2018		17407	—	MPC
2015 TN_{178}	91.0°	October 8, 2015	0	38805	—	MPC
2005 SB_{223}	91.2°	September 30, 2005	1	12200	Has a well-determined orbit	MPC
2014 MH_{55}	91.4°	June 29, 2014	6	96	—	MPC
2010 EQ_{169}	91.6°	March 8, 2010	?	15	Most highly inclined known main-belt asteroid (orbit is not well-known)	MPC
2015 RK_{245}	91.6°	September 13, 2015	0	184680	—	MPC
2016 TK_{2}	92.3°	July 13, 2016	2	6075	—	MPC
(518151) 2016 FH_{13}	93.5°	March 29, 2016	0	91561	—	MPC
2014 PP_{69}	93.6°	August 5, 2014	1	8085	—	MPC
2015 BH_{311}	94.1°	January 20, 2015	?	39	—	MPC
2017 OX_{68}	94.7°	July 26, 2017		8720	—	MPC
2014 JJ_{57}	95.9°	May 9, 2014	0	95710	—	MPC
2013 HS_{150}	97.4°	April 16, 2013		220	—	MPC
(709487) 2013 BL76	98.5°	January 20, 2013		46716	Has a semi-major axis of 1254 AU, giving it the third largest semi-major axis of any known minor planet	MPC
2010 GW_{147}	99.8°	April 14, 2010	0	97888	—	MPC
2011 MM_{4}	100.4°	June 24, 2011	0	364936	—	MPC
2017 NM_{2}	101.2°	July 6, 2017	1	28014	—	MPC
2014 XS_{3}	101.3°	December 8, 2014	0	23544	—	MPC
2013 BN_{27}	101.8°	January 17, 2013		1400	—	MPC
(528219) 2008 KV42	103.3°	May 31, 2008	1	198550	—	MPC
(342842) 2008 YB3	105.0°	December 18, 2008	0	1608789	—	MPC
2016 PN_{66}	105.1°	August 14, 2016	0	63879	—	MPC
2010 GW_{64}	105.2°	April 6, 2010	0	9072	—	MPC
2012 YO_{6}	106.8°	December 22, 2012	3	6674	—	MPC
2009 DD_{47}	107.4°	February 27, 2009	?	1584	—	MPC
2017 UR_{52}	108.2°	October 29, 2017		1638	—	MPC
2007 VW_{266}	108.3°	November 12, 2007	5	2204	—	MPC
2011 SP_{25}	109.0°	September 20, 2011	3	3654	—	MPC
471325 Taowu	110.1°	May 31, 2011	1	234828	—	MPC
2005 TJ_{50}	110.2°	October 5, 2005	5	1488	—	MPC
2011 OR_{17}	110.5°	May 21, 2010		71808	—	MPC
2005 VX3	112.2°	November 1, 2005		4212	Semi-major axis of 837 AU, but has a somewhat short 81-day observation arc for such a large orbit	MPC
2017 SV13	113.2°	September 17, 2017	4	2160	—	MPC
2016 LS	114.3°	June 27, 2015	0	26688	—	MPC
2015 YY_{18}	118.2°	December 29, 2015	0	33454	—	MPC
2010 OM_{101}	118.7°	July 28, 2010	2	3535	—	MPC
(65407) 2002 RP120	118.9°	September 4, 2002	0	648554	This outer-planet crosser is a damocloid and SDO.	MPC
2010 PO_{58}	121.1°	August 5, 2010	8	120	—	MPC
2010 LG_{61}	123.8°	June 2, 2010	7	935	—	MPC
(468861) 2013 LU28	125.3°	June 8, 2013	0	238336	—	MPC
2014 SQ_{339}	128.5°	September 29, 2014	4	1334	—	MPC
2000 DG8	129.2°	February 25, 2000	2	42408	A damocloid and SDO. Crosses all the outer planets except Neptune. Came within 0.03 AU of Ceres in 1930.	MPC
2016 CO_{264}	129.8°	February 14, 2016	0	23800	—	MPC
2013 NS_{11}	130.3°	July 5, 2013	0	143510	—	MPC
2005 NP_{82}	130.5°	July 6, 2005	1	662673	—	MPC
2006 RG_{1}	133.4°	September 1, 2006	4	750	Has an orbit with a data arc of 25 days	MPC
2012 YE_{8}	136.0°	December 21, 2012	5	1066	—	MPC
2017 AX_{13}	137.2°	January 2, 2017	3	1785	—	MPC
2009 QY_{6}	137.6°	August 17, 2009	1	43990	—	MPC
2016 TP_{93}	138.3°	October 9, 2016	?	704	—	MPC
2016 YB_{13}	139.6°	December 23, 2016	1	50718	—	MPC
2019 EJ_{3}	139.7°	March 4, 2019	?	576	—	MPC
2015 AO_{44}	139.9°	November 27, 2014	0	115821	—	MPC
(336756) 2010 NV1	140.7°	July 1, 2010	0	330022	Perihelion at 9.4 AU, only 2008 KV_{42} has perihelion further out (154-day data arc)	MPC
2011 WS_{41}	141.6°	November 24, 2011	?	108	—	MPC
2010 OR_{1}	143.9°	January 25, 2010	1	35032	—	MPC
2010 BK118	143.9°	January 30, 2010		374596	Semi-major axis of 408 AU with perihelion at 6.1 AU in April 2012 (1 year data arc)	MPC
(523797) 2016 NM_{56}	144.0°	November 1, 2012	0	227052	—	MPC
2017 UW_{51}	144.2°	October 23, 2017		68442	—	MPC
2010 CG_{55}	146.2°	February 15, 2010	0	129000	—	MPC
2012 HD_{2}	146.8°	April 18, 2012	0	31408	—	MPC
2009 YS_{6}	147.7°	December 17, 2009	0	195734	—	MPC
2016 VY_{17}	148.4°	November 5, 2016	0	108624	—	MPC
2017 QO_{33}	148.8°	August 16, 2017	1	45360	—	MPC
2006 EX_{52}	150.1°	March 5, 2006	0	62310	q=2.58 AU and period=274 yr	MPC
(612093) 1999 LE31	151.8°	June 12, 1999	2	905838	A damocloid, Jupiter- and Saturn-crossing minor planet.	MPC
2017 SN_{33}	152.0°	September 19, 2017		7590	—	MPC
2018 WB_{1}	152.1°	November 19, 2018	7	351	—	MPC
2016 JK_{24}	152.3°	March 3, 2016	0	181965	—	MPC
2017 CW_{32}	152.4°	February 2, 2017		51500	—	MPC
343158 Marsyas	154.3°	April 29, 2009	0	771834	NEO that sometimes has the highest relative velocity to Earth (79 km/s) of known objects that come within 0.5 AU of Earth. However, the relative velocity at 1 AU from the sun is less than 72 km/s.	MPC
2013 LD_{16}	154.7°	June 6, 2013	0	14148	—	MPC
2021 TH165	154.9°	October 11, 2021	3	2510	Retrograde trans-Neptunian object close to a 3:–2 mean-motion orbital resonance with Neptune.	MPC
2015 FK_{37}	155.8°	March 20, 2015	?	748	—	MPC
2010 EB_{46}	156.3°	March 12, 2010	4	2460	—	MPC
2015 XR_{384}	157.5°	December 9, 2015	2	5580	—	MPC
2000 HE_{46}	158.5°	April 29, 2000	2	25960	—	MPC
2015 XX_{351}	159.0°	December 9, 2015	0	21120	—	MPC
2012 TL_{139}	160.0°	October 9, 2012	3	900	—	MPC
2019 CR	160.3°	February 4, 2019	1	36993	—	MPC
20461 Dioretsa	160.4°	June 8, 1999	0	256779	most highly inclined known minor planet from June 8, 1999, to July 13, 2004	MPC
2018 DO_{4}	160.4°	February 25, 2018	0	261726	—	MPC
2017 JB_{6}	160.7°	May 4, 2017	?	6844	—	MPC
(523800) 2017 KZ_{31}	161.6°	June 23, 2015	0	119280	—	MPC
514107 Kaʻepaokaʻāwela	163.0°	November 26, 2014	0	74898	A Jupiter co-orbital. First known example of a retrograde co-orbital asteroid with any of the planets. Might have an interstellar origin.	MPC; Src
2006 RJ2	164.6°	September 14, 2006	5	2849	—	MPC
2006 BZ8	165.3°	January 23, 2006	0	207459	—	MPC
2004 NN_{8}	165.5°	July 13, 2004		23944	Came within 0.80 AU of Saturn on 2007-Jun-05, most highly inclined known minor planet from 2004/07/13-2005/11/01	MPC
(459870) 2014 AT_{28}	165.5°	November 26, 2013	0	186598	—	MPC
2016 DF_{2}	167.0°	February 28, 2016	?	26	—	MPC
(330759) 2008 SO_{218}	170.3°	September 30, 2008	0	1058616	—	MPC
2014 UV_{114}	170.5°	October 26, 2014	?	34	—	MPC
2014 CW_{14}	170.7°	February 10, 2014	4	1938	—	MPC
2018 TL_{6}	170.9°	October 5, 2018	7	270	—	MPC
2016 EJ_{203}	170.9°	March 11, 2016	0	18081	—	MPC
2006 LM1	172.1°	June 3, 2006	?	48	Has a data arc of only 2 days, but has a very high inclination	MPC
(434620) 2005 VD	172.8°	November 1, 2005	0	228965	most highly inclined known minor planet from November 1, 2005, to June 1, 2013	MPC
2015 FR561	174.3°	March 18, 2015	9	165	Has a short data arc of 11 days and is now lost, but has a very high inclination. Thought to be Uranus- and Neptune-crossing.	MPC
2013 LA2	175.0°	June 1, 2013	6	1075	Has the highest inclination of any known minor planet	MPC

the value given when the number of observations is multiplied by the observation arc; larger values are generally better than smaller values depending on residuals.

=== Highly inclined ===
Minor planet designation	Inclination	Discovery date	Comment	Refs
1 Ceres	10.593°	January 1, 1801	most highly inclined known minor planet from January 1, 1801, to March 28, 1802	MPC
2 Pallas	34.841°	March 28, 1802	most highly inclined known minor planet from March 28, 1802, to October 31, 1920	MPC
944 Hidalgo	42.525°	October 31, 1920	most highly inclined known minor planet from October 31, 1920, to May 22, 1950	MPC
1373 Cincinnati	38.949°	August 30, 1935	First main-belt asteroid discovered to have an inclination greater than 2 Pallas. Most highly inclined known main-belt asteroid from August 30, 1935, to June 14, 1980	MPC
1580 Betulia	52.083°	May 22, 1950	most highly inclined known minor planet from May 22, 1950, to July 4, 1973	MPC
2938 Hopi	41.436°	June 14, 1980	Most highly inclined known main-belt asteroid from June 14, 1980, to September 20, 2000	MPC
(5496) 1973 NA	67.999°	July 4, 1973	An Apollo asteroid, Mars-crosser and +1 km NEO; most highly inclined known minor planet from 4 July 1973 to 8 August 1999.	MPC
(22653) 1998 QW_{2}	45.794°	August 17, 1998	Most highly inclined known main-belt asteroid from August 17, 1998, to October 19, 1998	MPC
(88043) 2000 UE_{110}	51.998°	October 29, 2000	First main-belt asteroid discovered and numbered to have an inclination greater than 50°.	MPC
(138925) 2001 AU_{43}	72.132°	January 4, 2001	A Mars-crosser and near-Earth object.	MPC
(127546) 2002 XU93	77.904°	December 4, 2002	A damocloid and SDO. It is almost a Uranus outer-grazer.	MPC
(196256) 2003 EH1	70.790°	March 6, 2003	A Mars-crosser, near-Earth object and Jupiter inner-grazer.	MPC
1998 UQ_{1}	64.281°	October 19, 1998	Most highly inclined known main-belt asteroid from 1998/10/19-2007/11/01	MPC
(467372) 2004 LG	70.725°	June 9, 2004	A Mercury- through Mars-crosser and near-Earth object.	MPC
2007 VR_{6}	68.659°	November 1, 2007	Most highly inclined known main-belt asteroid from November 1, 2007, to September 26, 2008	MPC
2008 SB_{85}	74.247°	September 26, 2008	Most highly inclined known main-belt asteroid from September 26, 2008, to March 8, 2010	MPC

=== Trojans ===
- Earth trojans: (706765) 2010 TK7 and (614689) 2020 XL5.
- Mars trojans: (121514) 1999 UJ7, 5261 Eureka, (101429) 1998 VF31, (311999) 2007 NS2, (385250) 2001 DH47, (816688) 2011 SC191, 2011 UN63, and the candidate 2011 SL25.
- Jupiter trojans: the first one was discovered in 1906, 588 Achilles, and the current total is over 15,000.

== Viewed in detail ==
=== Spacecraft targets ===
Name	Diameter (km)	Discovered	Spacecraft	Year(s)	Closest approach (km)	Closest approach (asteroid radii)	Notes	Landmark(s)
1 Ceres	939.4	January 1, 1801	Dawn	2014–2018	375	0.80	Dawn took its first "close up" picture of Ceres in December 2014, and entered orbit in March 2015	First likely dwarf planet visited by a spacecraft, largest asteroid visited by a spacecraft
4 Vesta	525.4	March 29, 1807	Dawn	2011–2012	210	0.76	Dawn broke orbit on 5 September 2012 and headed to Ceres, where it arrived in March 2015	First "big four" asteroid visited by a spacecraft, largest asteroid visited by a spacecraft at the time
21 Lutetia	120×100×80	November 15, 1852	Rosetta	2010	3,162	64.9	Flyby on 10 July 2010	Largest asteroid visited by a spacecraft at the time
243 Ida	56×24×21	September 29, 1884	Galileo	1993	2,390	152	Flyby; discovered Dactyl	First asteroid with a moon visited by a spacecraft, largest asteroid visited by spacecraft at the time
253 Mathilde	66×48×46	November 12, 1885	NEAR Shoemaker	1997	1,212	49.5	Flyby	Largest asteroid visited by a spacecraft at the time
433 Eros	13×13×33	August 13, 1898	NEAR Shoemaker	1998–2001	0	0	1998 flyby; 2000 orbited (first asteroid studied from orbit); 2001 landing	First asteroid landing, first asteroid orbited by a spacecraft, first near-Earth asteroid (NEA) visited by a spacecraft
951 Gaspra	18.2×10.5×8.9	July 30, 1916	Galileo	1991	1,600	262	Flyby	First asteroid visited by a spacecraft
2867 Šteins	4.6	November 4, 1969	Rosetta	2008	800	302	Flyby	First asteroid visited by the ESA
4179 Toutatis	4.5×~2	February 10, 1934	Chang'e 2	2012	3.2	0.70	Flyby	First asteroid visited by China
5535 Annefrank	4.0	March 23, 1942	Stardust	2002	3,079	1230	Flyby	
9969 Braille	2.2×0.6	May 27, 1992	Deep Space 1	1999	26	12.7	Flyby; followed by flyby of Comet Borrelly	
25143 Itokawa	0.5×0.3×0.2	September 26, 1998	Hayabusa	2005	0	0	Landed; returned dust samples to Earth	First asteroid with returned samples, smallest asteroid visited by a spacecraft, first asteroid visited by a non-NASA spacecraft
162173 Ryugu	1.0	May 10, 1999	Hayabusa2	2018–2019	0	0	Multiple landers/rovers, sample return	First rovers on an asteroid
101955 Bennu	0.492	September 11, 1999	OSIRIS-REx	2018–2021	0	0	Sample return	Smallest asteroid orbited, potentially hazardous object
65803 Didymos	0.492	September 11, 1999	DART/LICIACube	2022	1.2	3.2	Impactor/flyby	Moon Dimorphos impacted by DART spacecraft, flown by LICIACube
152830 Dinkinesh	0.790	October 15, 1999	Lucy	2023	425	1076	Flyby; first of 8 planned asteroid flybys	Smallest main-belt asteroid visited to date; discovered first contact binary satellite Selam
52246 Donaldjohanson	3.9	March 2, 1981	Lucy	2025	960	240	Flyby; second of 8 planned asteroid flybys	First explored asteroid named after a living person
98943 Torifune	0.476	February 3, 2001	Hayabusa2	2026	0.8	3.4	Flyby	Closest asteroid flyby

=== Surface resolved by telescope or lightcurve ===
- 1 Ceres
- 2 Pallas
- 3 Juno
- 4 Vesta
- 5 Astraea
- 6 Hebe
- 7 Iris
- 8 Flora
- 9 Metis
- 10 Hygiea
- 12 Victoria
- 13 Egeria
- 14 Irene
- 15 Eunomia
- 16 Psyche
- 18 Melpomene
- 26 Proserpina
- 29 Amphitrite
- 35 Leukothea
- 37 Fides
- 44 Nysa
- 51 Nemausa
- 52 Europa
- 65 Cybele
- 87 Sylvia
- 89 Julia
- 121 Hermione
- 130 Elektra
- 201 Penelope
- 216 Kleopatra
- 324 Bamberga
- 511 Davida
- 925 Alphonsina
- 1140 Crimea
- 9969 Braille
- (33342) 1998 WT24
- 66391 Moshup
- (136617) 1994 CC
- (285263) 1998 QE2
- (357439) 2004 BL86

=== Multiple systems resolved by telescope ===
- 90 Antiope

=== Comet-like activity ===
- 2006 VW139
- P/2013 P5

=== Disintegration ===
- 6478 Gault
- P/2013 R3

== Timeline ==
=== Landmark asteroids ===
Name	Diameter (km)	Discovered	Comment
1 Ceres	939	January 1, 1801	First asteroid discovered
5 Astraea	117	December 8, 1845	First asteroid discovered after original four (38 years later)
20 Massalia	136	September 19, 1852	First asteroid named after a city (Marseille)
45 Eugenia	202	June 27, 1857	First asteroid named after living person
87 Sylvia	261	May 16, 1866	First asteroid known to have more than one moon (determined in 2005)
90 Antiope	80×80	October 1, 1866	Double asteroid with two nearly equal components; its double nature was discovered using adaptive optics in 2000
216 Kleopatra	217×94	April 10, 1880	Metallic asteroid with "ham-bone" shape and 2 satellites
243 Ida	56×24×21	September 29, 1884	First asteroid known to have a moon (determined in 1994)
243 Ida I Dactyl	1.4	February 17, 1994	Moon of 243 Ida, first confirmed satellite of an asteroid
279 Thule	127	October 25, 1888	Orbits in the asteroid belt's outermost edge in a 3:4 orbital resonance with Jupiter
288 Glauke	32	February 20, 1890	Exceptionally slow rotation period of about 1200 hours (2 months)
323 Brucia	36	December 22, 1891	First asteroid discovered by means of astrophotography rather than visual observation
433 Eros	13×13×33	August 13, 1898	First near-Earth asteroid discovered and the second largest; first asteroid to be detected by radar; first asteroid orbited and landed upon
482 Petrina	23.3	March 3, 1902	First asteroid named after dog
490 Veritas	115	September 3, 1902	Created in one of the largest asteroid-on-asteroid collisions of the past 100 million years
588 Achilles	135.5	February 22, 1906	First Jupiter trojan discovered
624 Hektor	370×195	February 10, 1907	Largest Jupiter trojan discovered
719 Albert	2.4	October 3, 1911	Last numbered asteroid to be lost then recovered
935 Clivia	6.4	September 7, 1920	First asteroid named after flower
1090 Sumida	13	February 20, 1928	Lowest numbered asteroid with no English Wikipedia entry
1125 China	27	October 30, 1957	First asteroid discovery to be credited to an institution rather than a person
1566 Icarus	1.4	June 27, 1949	First Mercury crosser discovered
2309 Mr. Spock	21.3	August 16, 1971	First asteroid named after cat
3200 Phaethon	5	October 11, 1983	First asteroid discovered from space; source of Geminids meteor shower.
3753 Cruithne	5	October 10, 1986	Unusual Earth-associated orbit
4179 Toutatis	4.5×2.4×1.9	January 4, 1989	Closely approached Earth on September 29, 2004
4769 Castalia	1.8×0.8	August 9, 1989	First asteroid to be radar-imaged in sufficient detail for 3D modeling
5261 Eureka	~2–4	June 20, 1990	First Mars trojan (Lagrangian point L_{5}) discovered
11885 Summanus	1.3	September 25, 1990	First automated discovery of a near-Earth object (NEO)
(29075) 1950 DA	1.1	February 23, 1950	Small chance to collide with Earth in 2880 (1 in 2,600 or 0.039%)
69230 Hermes	0.3	October 28, 1937	Named but not numbered until its recovery in 2003 (65 years later)
99942 Apophis	0.3	June 19, 2004	First asteroid to rank greater than one on the Torino Scale (it was ranked at 2, then 4; now down to 0). Previously better known by its provisional designation 2004 MN_{4}.
152830 Dinkinesh I Selam	0.22	November 1, 2023	First satellite discovered to be a contact-binary
(433953) 1997 XR2	0.23	December 4, 1997	First asteroid to rank greater than zero on the impact-risk Torino Scale (it was ranked 1; now at 0)
1998 KY26	0.030	June 2, 1998	Approached within 800,000 km of Earth
2002 AA29	0.1	January 9, 2002	Unusual Earth-associated orbit
2004 FH	0.030	March 15, 2004	Discovered before it approached within 43,000 km of Earth on March 18, 2004.
2008 TC3	~0.003	October 6, 2008	First Earth-impactor to be spotted before impact (on October 7, 2008)
(706765) 2010 TK7	~0.3	October 2010	First Earth trojan to be discovered
2014 RC	~0.017	September 1, 2014	Asteroid with fastest rotation: 16.2 seconds

=== Numbered minor planets that are also comets ===
Name	Cometary name	Comment
2060 Chiron	95P/Chiron	First centaur discovered in 1977, later identified to exhibit cometary behaviour. Also one of two minor planets (excluding dwarf planets) known to have a ring system
4015 Wilson–Harrington	107P/Wilson–Harrington	In 1992, it was realized that asteroid 1979 VA's orbit matched it with the positions of the lost comet Wilson–Harrington (1949 III)
7968 Elst–Pizarro	133P/Elst–Pizarro	Discovered in 1996 as a comet, but orbitally matched to asteroid 1979 OW_{7}
60558 Echeclus	174P/Echeclus	Centaur discovered in 2000, comet designation assigned in 2006
118401 LINEAR	176P/LINEAR (LINEAR 52)	Main-belt comet–asteroid discovered to have a coma on November 26, 2005

The above table lists only numbered asteroids that are also comets. Note there are several cases where a non-numbered minor planet turned out to be a comet, e.g. C/2001 OG108 (LONEOS), which was provisionally designated 2001 OG_{108}.

=== Minor planets that were misnamed and renamed ===
In earlier times, before the modern numbering and naming rules were in effect, asteroids were sometimes given numbers and names before their orbits were precisely known. And in a few cases duplicate names were given to the same object (with modern use of computers to calculate and compare orbits with old recorded positions, this type of error no longer occurs). This led to a few cases where asteroids had to be renamed.

Minor planet name	Description
330 Adalberta	An object discovered March 18, 1892, by Max Wolf with provisional designation "1892 X" was named 330 Adalberta, but was lost and never recovered. In 1982 it was determined that the observations leading to the designation of 1892 X were stars, and the object never existed. The name and number 330 Adalberta was then reused for another asteroid discovered by Max Wolf on February 2, 1910, which had the provisional designation A910 CB.
525 Adelaide and 1171 Rusthawelia	The object A904 EB discovered March 14, 1904, by Max Wolf was named 525 Adelaide and was subsequently lost. Later, the object 1930 TA discovered October 3, 1930, by Sylvain Arend was named 1171 Rusthawelia. In those pre-computer days, it was not realized until 1958 that these were one and the same object. The name Rusthawelia was kept (and discovery credited to Arend); the name 525 Adelaide was reused for the object 1908 EKa discovered October 21, 1908, by Joel Hastings Metcalf.
715 Transvaalia and 933 Susi	The object 1911 LX discovered April 22, 1911, by H. E. Wood was named 715 Transvaalia. On April 23, 1920, the object 1920 GZ was discovered and named 933 Susi. In 1928 it was realized that these were one and the same object. The name Transvaalia was kept, and the name and number 933 Susi was reused for the object 1927 CH discovered February 10, 1927, by Karl Reinmuth.
864 Aase and 1078 Mentha	The object A917 CB discovered February 13, 1917, by Max Wolf was named 864 Aase, and the object 1926 XB discovered December 7, 1926, by Karl Reinmuth was named 1078 Mentha. In 1958 it was discovered that these were one and the same object. In 1974, this was resolved by keeping the name 1078 Mentha and reusing the name and number 864 Aase for the object 1921 KE, discovered September 30, 1921, by Karl Reinmuth.
1095 Tulipa and 1449 Virtanen	The object 1928 DC discovered February 24, 1928, by Karl Reinmuth was named 1095 Tulipa, and the object 1938 DO discovered February 20, 1938, by Yrjö Väisälä was named 1449 Virtanen. In 1966 it was discovered that these were one and the same object. The name 1449 Virtanen was kept and the name and number 1095 Tulipa was reused for the object 1926 GS discovered April 14, 1926, by Karl Reinmuth.
1125 China and 3789 Zhongguo	The object 1928 UF discovered October 25, 1928, by Zhang Yuzhe (Y. C. Chang) was named 1125 China, and was later lost. Later, the object 1957 UN_{1} was discovered on October 30, 1957, at Purple Mountain Observatory and was initially incorrectly believed to be the rediscovery of the object 1928 UF. The name and number 1125 China were then reused for the object 1957 UN_{1}, and 1928 UF remained lost. In 1986, the object 1986 QK1 was discovered and proved to be the real rediscovery of 1928 UF. This object was given the new number and name 3789 Zhongguo. Note Zhongguo is the Mandarin Chinese word for "China", in pinyin transliteration.
Asteroid 1317 and 787 Moskva	The object 1914 UQ discovered April 20, 1914, by G. N. Neujmin was named 787 Moskva (and retains that name to this day). The object 1934 FD discovered on March 19, 1934, by C. Jackson was given the sequence number 1317. In 1938, G. N. Neujmin found that asteroid 1317 and 787 Moskva were one and the same object. The sequence number 1317 was later reused for the object 1935 RC discovered on September 1, 1935, by Karl Reinmuth; that object is now known as 1317 Silvretta.

=== Landmark names ===
Asteroids were originally named after female mythological figures. Over time the rules loosened.

First asteroid with non-Classical and non-Latinized name: 64 Angelina (in honor of a research station)

First asteroid with a non-feminine name: 139 Juewa (ambiguous) or 141 Lumen

First asteroid with a non-feminized man's name: 433 Eros

Lowest-numbered unnamed asteroid (As of 2026): (4596) 1981 QB

== Landmark numbers ==
Many landmark numbers had specially chosen names for asteroids, and there was some debate about whether Pluto should have received number 10000, for example. This list includes some non-asteroids.

1 × Powers of 10
- 1 Ceres
- 10 Hygiea
- 100 Hekate
- 1000 Piazzia
- 10000 Myriostos
- 100000 Astronautica
2 × Powers of 10
- 2 Pallas
- 20 Massalia
- 200 Dynamene
- 2000 Herschel
- 20000 Varuna (KBO)
- 200000 Danielparrott
3 × Powers of 10
- 3 Juno
- 30 Urania
- 300 Geraldina
- 3000 Leonardo
- 30000 Camenzind
- (300000) 2006 UW30
4 × Powers of 10
- 4 Vesta
- 40 Harmonia
- 400 Ducrosa
- 4000 Hipparchus
- (40000) 1998 HZ87
- (400000) 2006 DK190
5 × Powers of 10
- 5 Astraea
- 50 Virginia
- 500 Selinur
- 5000 IAU
- 50000 Quaoar (KBO)
- 500000 Kaichi
6 × Powers of 10
- 6 Hebe
- 60 Echo
- 600 Musa
- 6000 United Nations
- 60000 Miminko
- (600000) 2011 EG29
7 × Powers of 10
- 7 Iris
- 70 Panopaea
- 700 Auravictrix
- 7000 Curie
- (70000) 1998 XX6
- (700000) 1994 UX10
8 × Powers of 10
- 8 Flora
- 80 Sappho
- 800 Kressmannia
- 8000 Isaac Newton
- (80000) 1999 FR33
- (800000) 2013 YN87
9 × Powers of 10
- 9 Metis
- 90 Antiope
- 900 Rosalinde
- 9000 Hal
- (90000) 2002 TK102
Repeated 1
- 1 Ceres
- 11 Parthenope
- 111 Ate
- 1111 Reinmuthia
- 11111 Repunit
- (111111) 2001 VO84
Repeated 2
- 2 Pallas
- 22 Kalliope
- 222 Lucia
- 2222 Lermontov
- 22222 Hodios
- (222222) 2000 FK15
Repeated 3
- 3 Juno
- 33 Polyhymnia
- 333 Badenia
- 3333 Schaber
- (33333) 1998 SP66
- (333333) 2001 RC3
Repeated 4
- 4 Vesta
- 44 Nysa
- 444 Gyptis
- 4444 Escher
- (44444) 1998 UZ19
- (444444) 2006 CL67
Repeated 5
- 5 Astraea
- 55 Pandora
- 555 Norma
- 5555 Wimberly
- 55555 DNA
- (555555) 2014 AG4
Repeated 6
- 6 Hebe
- 66 Maja
- 666 Desdemona
- 6666 Frö
- (66666) 1999 TL9
- (666666) 2010 SR59
Repeated 7
- 7 Iris
- 77 Frigga
- 777 Gutemberga
- 7777 Consadole
- (77777) 2001 QW16
- (777777) 2009 HB115
Repeated 8
- 8 Flora
- 88 Thisbe
- 888 Parysatis
- 8888 Tartaglia
- (88888) 2001 SE288
- (888888) 2010 RD158
Repeated 9
- 9 Metis
- 99 Dike
- 999 Zachia
- 9999 Wiles
- (99999) 1981 FP

== See also ==
- List of minor planets
- List of minor planets named after people
- List of minor planets named after places
- List of instrument-resolved minor planets
- List of minor planet moons
- List of Mercury-crossing minor planets
- List of Venus-crossing minor planets
- List of Earth-crossing asteroids
- List of Mars-crossing minor planets
- List of Jupiter-crossing minor planets
- List of Solar System objects by size
- Lists of astronomical objects
- List of predicted asteroid impacts on Earth
- Small Solar System body
- Amor asteroid
- Apollo asteroid
- Aten asteroid
- Atira asteroid
- Centaur (small Solar System body)
- ʻOumuamua

== Books ==
- Dictionary of Minor Planet Names, 5th ed.: Prepared on Behalf of Commission 20 Under the Auspices of the International Astronomical Union, Lutz D. Schmadel, ISBN 3-540-00238-3
