= 704 Interamnia =

Large asteroid in the asteroid belt

- VLT-SPHERE image of Interamnia

Discovery
- Discovered by: Vincenzo Cerulli
- Discovery date: 2 October 1910

Designations
- Pronunciation: /ɪntərˈæmniə/
- Named after: Teramo
- Alternative designations: 1910 KU; 1952 MW
- Minor planet category: Main belt
- Adjectives: Interamnian /ɪntərˈæmniən/

Orbital characteristics
- Epoch July 01, 2021 (JD 2459396.5, heliocentric)
- Uncertainty parameter 0
- Observation arc: 110.8 yr
- Aphelion: 3.53 AU (528 Gm)
- Perihelion: 2.58 AU (386 Gm)
- Semi-major axis: 3.056 AU (457.2 Gm)
- Eccentricity: 0.155
- Orbital period (sidereal): 5.34 yr (1951 d)
- Average orbital speed: 16.92 km/s
- Mean anomaly: 248°
- Mean motion: 0° 11^{m} 4.2^{s} / day
- Inclination: 17.31°
- Longitude of ascending node: 280.3°
- Argument of perihelion: 94.8°

Physical characteristics
- Dimensions: (354±9 × 343±8 × 303±7) km (362 × 348 × 310) ± 8 km
- Mean diameter: 332±5 km (Note: volume equivalent); 332±6 km
- Mass: (3.235±0.066)×10^{19} kg (Note: Calculated from its standard gravitational parameter GM = 2.159±0.044 km^{3}/s^{2}.)
- Mean density: 1.69±0.08 g/cm^{3}
- Synodic rotation period: 8.712336(10) h
- Axial tilt: 36°
- Pole ecliptic longitude: 87±5°
- Pole ecliptic latitude: 62±5°
- Geometric albedo: 0.067; 0.078±0.014 geometric (0.645±0.014 BV, 0.259±0.021 UB)
- Spectral type: F (Tholen); B (SMASSII)
- Apparent magnitude: 9.9 to 13.0
- Absolute magnitude (H): 5.94; 6.34

704 Interamnia is a large F-type asteroid. With a mean diameter of around 330 kilometres, it is the fifth-largest asteroid, after Ceres, Vesta, Pallas and Hygiea. Its mean distance from the Sun is 3.067 AU. It was discovered on 2 October 1910 by Vincenzo Cerulli, and named after the Latin name for Teramo, Italy, where Cerulli worked. Its mass is probably between fifth and tenth highest in the asteroid belt, with a mass estimated to be 1.2% of the mass of the entire asteroid belt. Observations by the Very Large Telescope's SPHERE imager in 2017–2019, combined with occultation results, indicate that the shape of Interamnia may be consistent with hydrostatic equilibrium for a body of its density with a rotational period of 7.6 hours. (Its current period is 8.7 hours.) This suggests that Interamnia may have formed as an equilibrium body, and that impacts changed its rotational period after it fully solidified.

== Characteristics ==
Observations of 704 Interamnia carried out at the Observatory of Teramo (founded by the discoverer of the asteroid, Vincenzo Cerulli) for the 101st anniversary since its discovery. The animation shows Interamnia's path over three hours.

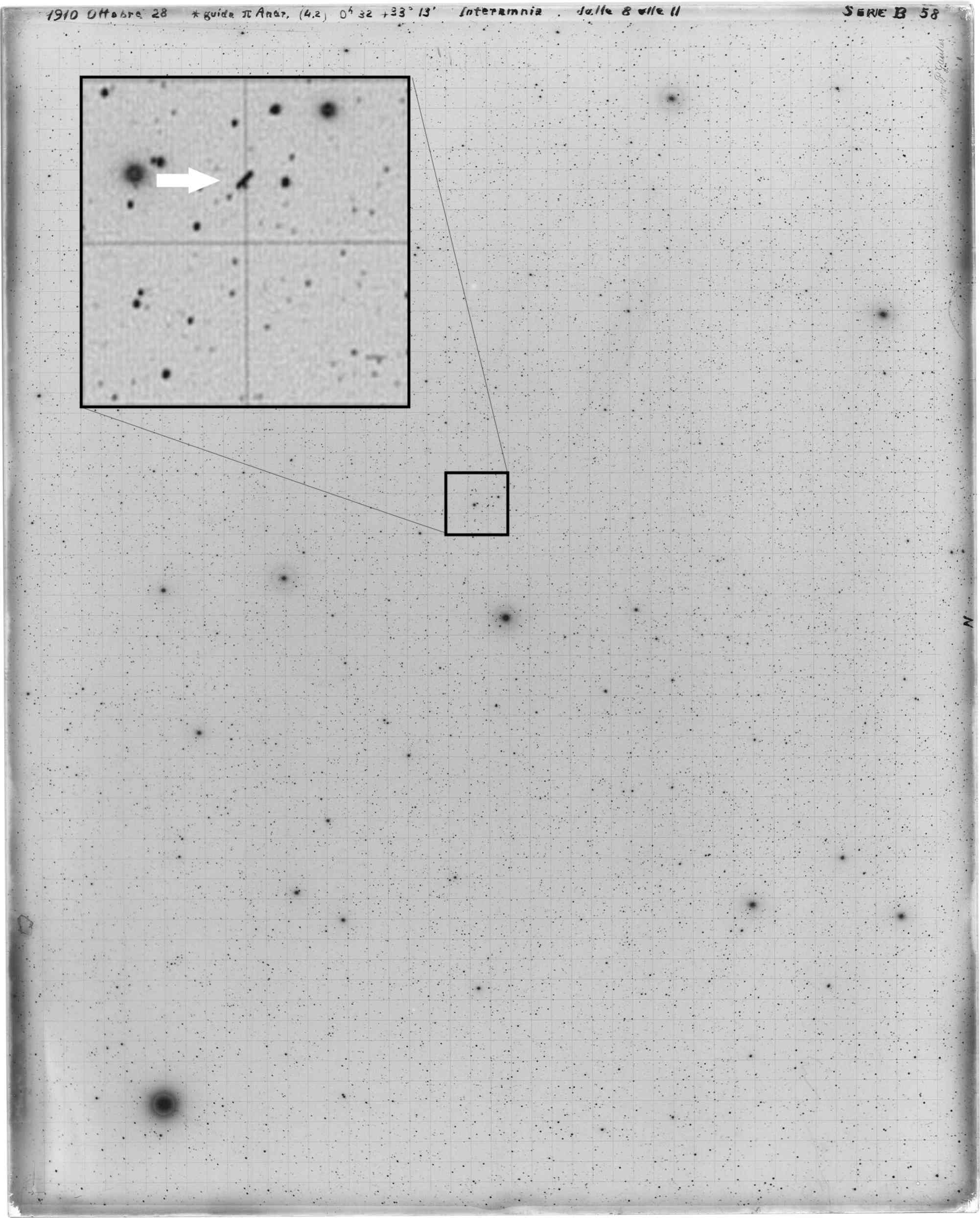
One of the first photographic plates of 704 Interamnia. The image was taken in Oct. 1910; the path of the asteroid is shown in the zoom.

Although Interamnia is the largest asteroid after the "big four", it is a very little-studied body. It is easily the largest of the F-type asteroids, but until 2017–2019 there existed very few details of its internal composition or shape, and no light curve analysis has yet been done to determine the ecliptic coordinates of Interamnia's poles (and hence its axial tilt). Studies by the Very Large Telescope give an average diameter of about 332 km and found an ellipsoidal shape for Interamnia, similar to 4 Vesta; the resulting density calculation (1.98 ± 0.68 g·cm^{−3}) is not precise enough to definitely infer Interamnia's composition, but the presence of hydrated materials at the surface and its overall spectral similarities to Ceres suggest that it is likely an icy body. The absence of an affiliated asteroid family implies that Interamnia has not suffered a giant impact within the past 3 billion years, in contrast to 4 Vesta and 10 Hygiea.

Its very dark surface and relatively large distance from the Sun means Interamnia can never be seen with 10x50 binoculars. At most oppositions its magnitude is around +11.0, which is less than the minimum brightness of Vesta, Ceres or Pallas. Even at a perihelic opposition its magnitude is only +9.9, which is over four magnitudes lower than Vesta.

== Surface ==
There are no deep basins visible in the VLT images. Any large craters must have flat floors, consistent with an icy C/F-type composition.

== Mass ==
In 2001, Michalak estimated Interamnia to have a mass of (7±2)×10^{19} kg. Michalak's estimate depends on the masses of 19 Fortuna, 29 Amphitrite, and 16 Psyche; thus this mass was obtained assuming an incomplete dynamical model.

In 2011, Baer calculated Interamnia had a mass of (3.9±0.2)×10^{19} kg.

Goffin's 2014 astrometric reanalysis gives an even lower mass of (2.7±0.1)×10^{19} kg.

In 2020, Hanuš et al. consolidated 21 selected prior mass estimates, dating from 1992 to 2017, with a metastatistical result of (3.8±1.3)×10^{19} kg (that is, (2.5 to 5.1)×10^{19} kg to within 1 sigma uncertainty.

== Gallery ==
Animation of 704 Interamnia's orbit 2000–2020
Sun · Earth · Mars · Jupiter · 704 Interamnia

The Transiting Exoplanet Survey Satellite (TESS) observed 704 Interamnia passing close to a target star, TIC 14802783, on 18/01/19.

== See also ==
- List of Solar System objects by size
