= 324 Bamberga =

Main-belt asteroid

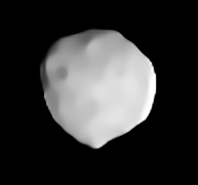
- VLT image of Bamberga

Discovery
- Discovered by: Johann Palisa
- Discovery date: 25 February 1892

Designations
- Pronunciation: /bæmˈbɜːrɡə/
- Named after: Bamberg
- Minor planet category: Main belt
- Adjectives: Bambergian /bæmˈbɜːrdʒiən, -ɡiən/

Orbital characteristics
- Epoch 31 July 2016 (JD 2457600.5)
- Uncertainty parameter 0
- Observation arc: 124.08 yr (45321 d)
- Aphelion: 3.59442 AU (537.718 Gm)
- Perihelion: 1.77023 AU (264.823 Gm)
- Semi-major axis: 2.68232 AU (401.269 Gm)
- Eccentricity: 0.34004
- Orbital period (sidereal): 4.39 yr (1604.6 d)
- Mean anomaly: 225.419°
- Mean motion: 0° 13^{m} 27.682^{s} / day
- Inclination: 11.1011°
- Longitude of ascending node: 327.883°
- Argument of perihelion: 44.2409°

Physical characteristics
- Dimensions: 234 × 224 × 225 km (± 9 × 9 × 7 km)
- Mean diameter: 227±3 km
- Mass: (9.814±0.090)×10^{18} kg (Note: Calculated from its standard gravitational parameter GM = 0.655±0.006 km^{3}/s^{2}.)
- Mean density: 1.60±0.07 g/cm^{3}
- Synodic rotation period: 29.4403±0.00005 h
- Axial tilt: 154°
- Pole ecliptic longitude: 17° ± 4°
- Pole ecliptic latitude: −57° ± 5°
- Geometric albedo: 0.060 (calculated); 0.050±0.007
- Spectral type: C-type asteroid
- Absolute magnitude (H): 6.82; 7.19

324 Bamberga is one of the largest asteroids in the asteroid belt. It was discovered by Johann Palisa on 25 February 1892 in Vienna. It is one of the top-20 largest asteroids in the asteroid belt. Apart from the near-Earth asteroid Eros, it was the last asteroid which is ever easily visible with binoculars to be discovered.

Overall Bamberga is the tenth-brightest main-belt asteroid after, in order, Vesta, Pallas, Ceres, Iris, Hebe, Juno, Melpomene, Eunomia and Flora. Its high eccentricity (for comparison 36% higher than that of Pluto), though, means that at most oppositions other asteroids reach higher magnitudes.

== Observation ==
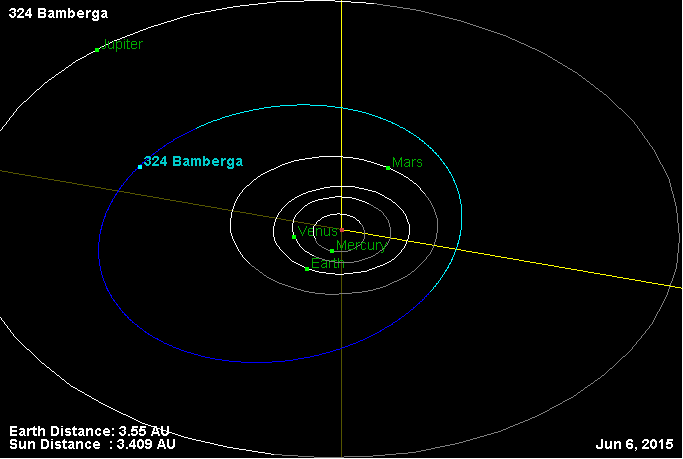
Bamberga's orbit

Although its very high orbital eccentricity means its opposition magnitude varies greatly, at a rare opposition near perihelion Bamberga can reach a magnitude of +8.0, which is as bright as Saturn's moon Titan. Such near-perihelion oppositions occur on a regular cycle every twenty-two years, with the last occurring in 2013 and the next in 2035, when attaining magnitude 8.1 on 13 September. Its brightness at these rare near-perihelion oppositions makes Bamberga the brightest C-type asteroid, roughly one magnitude brighter than 10 Hygiea's maximum brightness of around +9.1. At such an opposition Bamberga can in fact be closer to Earth than any main-belt asteroid with magnitude above +9.5, getting as close as 0.78 AU. For comparison, 7 Iris never comes closer than 0.85 AU and 4 Vesta never closer than 1.13 AU (when it becomes visible to the naked eye in a light pollution-free sky).

== Characteristics ==
The 29-hour rotation period is unusually long for an asteroid more than 150 km in diameter. Its spectral class is intermediate between the C-type and P-type asteroids.

10μ radiometric data collected from Kitt Peak in 1975 gave a diameter estimate of 255 km. An occultation of Bamberga was observed on 8 December 1987, and gave a diameter of about 228 km, in agreement with IRAS results. In 1988 a search for satellites or dust orbiting this asteroid was performed using the UH88 telescope at the Mauna Kea Observatories, but the effort came up empty.
