= 88 Thisbe =

Main-belt asteroid

- VLT-SPHERE image of Thisbe

Discovery
- Discovered by: Christian Heinrich Friedrich Peters
- Discovery date: 15 June 1866

Designations
- Pronunciation: /ˈθɪzbiː/
- Named after: Thisbē
- Minor planet category: Main belt
- Adjectives: Thisbean /θɪzˈbiːən/, /ˈθɪzbiən/

Orbital characteristics
- Epoch 9 June 2026 (JD 2461200.5)
- Uncertainty parameter 0
- Aphelion: 3.2244 AU
- Perihelion: 2.3081 AU
- Semi-major axis: 2.7662 AU
- Eccentricity: 0.1656
- Orbital period (sidereal): 1,680.46 d (4.60 yr)
- Mean anomaly: 244.361°
- Inclination: 5.2262°
- Longitude of ascending node: 276.320°
- Argument of perihelion: 36.967°
- T_{Jupiter}: 3.313

Physical characteristics
- Dimensions: 241 × 221 × 195 km (± 13 × 12 × 12 km)
- Mean diameter: 218±3 km
- Mass: (8.75±0.13)×10^{18} kg (2025) (Note: Calculated from its standard gravitational parameter GM = 0.584±0.009 km^{3}/s^{2}.) (7.20±0.43)×10^{18} kg (2023)
- Mean density: 1.61±0.07 g/cm^{3} (2025); 1.33±0.10 g/cm^{3} (2023)
- Synodic rotation period: 6.041321±0.000001 h
- Axial tilt: 21°
- Pole ecliptic longitude: 350° ± 3°
- Pole ecliptic latitude: 116° ± 3°
- Geometric albedo: 0.057; 0.0671 ± 0.003; 0.067
- Spectral type: B
- Absolute magnitude (H): 7.04; 7.24

88 Thisbe is the 13th largest main-belt asteroid. C. H. F. Peters discovered it on 15 June 1866, named after Thisbe, heroine of a Roman fable. This asteroid orbits the Sun at a distance of 2.768 AU over a period of 4.60 years and an orbital eccentricity (ovalness) of 0.165. The orbital plane is inclined at an angle of 5.219° to the ecliptic.

On 7 October 1981, asteroid 88 Thisbe was observed to occult the 9th-magnitude star SAO 187124 from 12 sites. The timing of the different chords across the asteroid provided a diameter estimate of 232±12 km. This is 10% larger than the diameter estimate based on radiometric techniques. During 2000, 88 Thisbe was observed by radar from the Arecibo Observatory. The return signal matched an effective diameter of 207 ± 22 km. This is consistent with the asteroid dimensions computed through other means.

Photometric observations of this asteroid during 1977 gave a light curve with a period of 6.0422 ± 0.006 hours and a brightness variation of 0.19 in magnitude.

== Perturbation ==
Asteroid 7 Iris has perturbed Thisbe; in 2001, Michalak estimated it to have a mass of 15×10^{18} kg. (Note: (7.4 ± 1.3)×10^{−12} M_{☉} = 1.47×10^{19} kg) But Iris is strongly perturbed by many minor planets such as 10 Hygiea and 15 Eunomia.

In 2008, Baer estimated Thisbe to have a mass of 10.5×10^{18} kg. In 2011, Baer revised this to 18.3×10^{18} kg with an uncertainty of 1.1×10^{18} kg.
