= 2010 JL88 =

Near-Earth asteroid

2010 JL_{88}
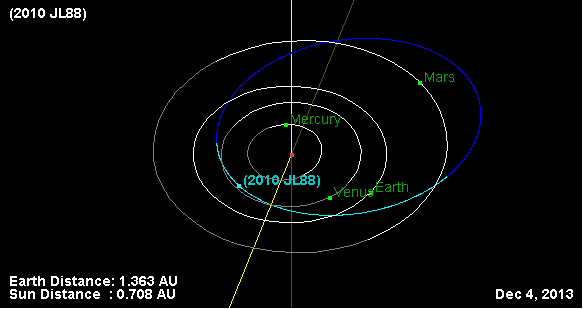
- Orbit of 2010 JL_{88}

Discovery
- Discovery site: Siding Spring Survey (unaccredited)
- Discovery date: 15 May 2010

Designations
- Minor planet category: Apollo · NEO

Orbital characteristics
- Epoch 21 November 2025 (JD 2461000.5)
- Uncertainty parameter 7
- Aphelion: 2.1437 AU
- Perihelion: 0.70722 AU
- Semi-major axis: 1.4254 AU
- Eccentricity: 0.50386
- Orbital period (sidereal): 1.70 yr (621.61 d)
- Mean anomaly: 16.193°
- Mean motion: 0° 34^{m} 44.904^{s} /day
- Inclination: 0.094436°
- Longitude of ascending node: 266.92°
- Argument of perihelion: 53.355°
- Earth MOID: 0.000909 AU

Physical characteristics
- Dimensions: 18.5±7.5 m
- Synodic rotation period: 24.5 s (0.0068295 h)
- Geometric albedo: 0.1
- Temperature: 186–323 K
- Absolute magnitude (H): 26.8

2010 JL_{88} is an unnumbered asteroid, classified as a near-Earth object of the Apollo group, approximately 19 meters in diameter. It was first observed by the Siding Spring Survey, Australia, on 15 May 2010. It is known to be the fastest rotator with an unambiguous period solution, having an exceptionally rapid rotation period of less than 25 seconds.

On May 17, 2010, it passed 0.00257 AU (384,000 km) from Earth. It ranks low on the Sentry Risk Table.

== Earth impact possibility ==
2010 JL_{88} has an Earth minimum orbit intersection distance of 0.45 Lunar Distances However, it only has a 1 in 1,449,000 (0.000069%) chance of impacting into Earth sometime after 2049. Even if it did impact, 2010 JL_{88} is so small that it would simply disintegrate in a manner similar to the Chelyabinsk meteor.

== Rotation ==
The asteroid was found to have a rapid rotation by the Magdalena Ridge Observatory's 2.4-meter telescope. It rotates at an extremely rapid rate of 24.5 seconds. 2010 JL_{88} is the second fastest natural rotating object discovered in the Solar System, after 2014 RC, which has a period of 16 seconds but still an uncertain period solution.

== See also ==
- List of exceptional asteroids
- List of fast rotators (minor planets)
