= 1095 Tulipa =

Eos asteroid

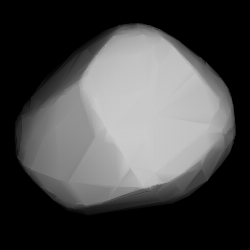
- Modelled shape of Tulipa from its lightcurve

Discovery
- Discovered by: K. Reinmuth
- Discovery site: Heidelberg Obs.
- Discovery date: 14 April 1926

Designations
- Pronunciation: /tjuːˈlaɪpə/
- Named after: Tulīpa (flowering plant)
- Alternative designations: 1926 GS · 1936 FE_{1} 1937 LQ · 1939 VG; 1941 CC · 1942 JG; 1942 KB · 1952 FE_{1} 1954 SO · 1954 UG_{3} 1955 XO · 1956 AD_{1} 1959 RM · 1965 VB
- Minor planet category: main-belt · (outer); Eos

Orbital characteristics
- Epoch 4 September 2017 (JD 2458000.5)
- Uncertainty parameter 0
- Observation arc: 90.50 yr (33,056 days)
- Aphelion: 3.0918 AU
- Perihelion: 2.9581 AU
- Semi-major axis: 3.0250 AU
- Eccentricity: 0.0221
- Orbital period (sidereal): 5.26 yr (1,922 days)
- Mean anomaly: 181.76°
- Mean motion: 0° 11^{m} 14.28^{s} / day
- Inclination: 10.030°
- Longitude of ascending node: 178.54°
- Argument of perihelion: 342.69°

Physical characteristics
- Mean diameter: 27.875±0.362 km 28.38±0.58 km 28.390±0.124 km 31.52±1.7 km 31.53 km (derived)
- Synodic rotation period: 2.77 h 2.787±0.0004 h 2.787±0.001 h 2.787 h (Note: Husarik (2011) web: rotation period 2.787 hours with a brightness amplitude of 0.20 mag. Quality Code of 3. Summary figures for (1095) Tulipa at the LCDB); 2.787153±0.000002 h 2.78721±0.00003 h 2.7873±0.0001 h 2.7879±0.0004 h
- Geometric albedo: 0.1208±0.014; 0.1229 (derived); 0.146±0.021; 0.151±0.007; 0.1544±0.0356
- Spectral type: S (assumed); B–V = 0.720; U–B = 0.370
- Absolute magnitude (H): 10.138±0.002 (R) · 10.40 · 10.42

1095 Tulipa (prov. designation: 1926 GS) is an Eos asteroid from the outer regions of the asteroid belt. It was discovered by German astronomer Karl Reinmuth at the Heidelberg-Königstuhl State Observatory in southwest Germany on 14 April 1926. The assumed S-type asteroid has a rotation period of 2.8 hours and measures approximately 30 kilometers (19 miles) in diameter. It was named after the flower Tulip (lat. Tulipa). Originally, the name was redundantly assigned to Florian asteroid 1449 Virtanen.

== Orbit and classification ==
Tulipa is a member the Eos family (606), the largest asteroid family of the outer main belt consisting of nearly 10,000 known asteroids. It orbits the Sun at a distance of 3.0–3.1 AU once every 5 years and 3 months (1,922 days). Its orbit has an eccentricity of 0.02 and an inclination of 10° with respect to the ecliptic.

The asteroid was first observed at Heidelberg on the night of its official discovery. The body's observation arc begins much later with its identification as 1941 CC at Turku Observatory in February 1941, or almost 15 years after its discovery.

== Etymology ==
This minor planet was named after the Tulip (lat. Tulipa), a genus of spring-blooming showy flowers of the Liliaceae (lily family). The name "Tulipa" was originally assigned to minor planet 1928 DC, discovered by Reinmuth on 24 February 1928, which turned out to be identical with 1449 Virtanen, and was consequently reassigned to 1926 GS (now 1095 Tulipa). The official naming citation was mentioned in The Names of the Minor Planets by Paul Herget in 1955 (H 103).

=== Reinmuth's flower ===
Karl Reinmuth submitted a list of 66 newly named asteroids in the early 1930s. The list covered his discoveries with numbers between (1009) and (1200). This list also contained a sequence of 28 asteroids, starting with 1054 Forsytia, that were all named after plants, in particular flowering plants (also see list of minor planets named after animals and plants).

== Physical characteristics ==
Tulipa is an assumed stony S-type, while the Eoan family's overall spectral type is that of a K-type.

=== Rotation period ===
A large number of rotational lightcurves of Tulipa have been obtained from photometric observations since 1983 (U=3/3-/3-/2+/3/3). Analysis of the best-rated lightcurve by Pierre Antonini, Raoul Behrend and Gino Farroni in May 2005, gave a rotation period of 2.78721 hours with a consolidated brightness variation of 0.23 magnitude (U=3).

=== Poles ===
Photometric data gathered with the 60-centimeter BlueEye600 robotic observatory near the Ondřejov Observatory in the Czech Republic, were used to model a lightcurve with a concurring period of 2.787153 hours and two spin axis of (142.0°, 40.0°) and (349.0°, 56.0°) in ecliptic coordinates (λ, β).

=== Diameter and albedo ===
According to the surveys carried out by the Infrared Astronomical Satellite IRAS, the Japanese Akari satellite and the NEOWISE mission of NASA's Wide-field Infrared Survey Explorer, Tulipa measures between 27.875 and 31.52 kilometers in diameter and its surface has an albedo between 0.1208 and 0.1544. The Collaborative Asteroid Lightcurve Link derives an albedo of 0.1229 and a diameter of 31.53 kilometers based on an absolute magnitude of 10.40.
