= 375 Ursula =

Main-belt asteroid

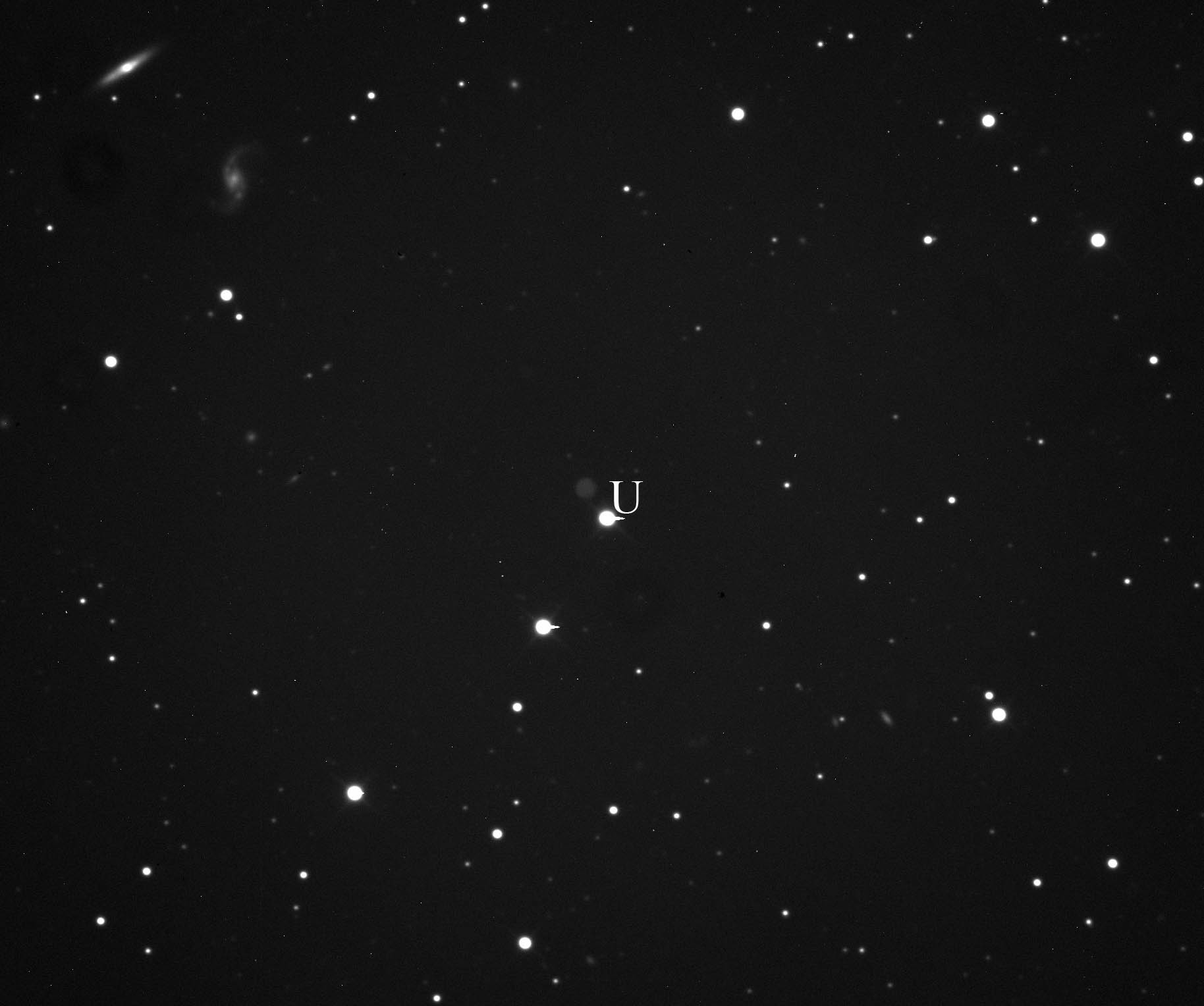
- Ursula imaged at amag 11.4 near the star TYC 581-36-1 (magnitude 11.9). The two galaxies are about magnitude 15.

Discovery
- Discovered by: A. Charlois
- Discovery site: Nice Obs.
- Discovery date: 18 September 1893

Designations
- Pronunciation: /ˈɜːrsjuːlə/
- Named after: unknown
- Alternative designations: 1893 AL
- Minor planet category: main-belt · (outer); Ursula
- Adjectives: Ursulian /ɜːrˈsjuːliən/

Orbital characteristics
- Epoch 4 September 2017 (JD 2458000.5)
- Uncertainty parameter 0
- Observation arc: 124.06 yr (45,314 days)
- Aphelion: 3.4544 AU
- Perihelion: 2.7928 AU
- Semi-major axis: 3.1236 AU
- Eccentricity: 0.1059
- Orbital period (sidereal): 5.52 yr (2,016 days)
- Mean anomaly: 189.03°
- Mean motion: 0° 10^{m} 42.6^{s} / day
- Inclination: 15.943°
- Longitude of ascending node: 336.57°
- Argument of perihelion: 342.15°

Physical characteristics
- Mean diameter: 191.65±4.01 km (composite estimate); 216.10 km (taken) Individual estimates: 189.45±54.76 km; 193.63±2.52 km; 215.67±54.80 km; 216±10 km
- Mass: (5.50±0.66)×10^{18} kg (Note: Calculated from its standard gravitational parameter GM = 0.367±0.044 km^{3}/s^{2}.)
- Mean density: 1.04 g/cm^{3} (Note: Assuming a diameter of 216 km.)
- Synodic rotation period: 16.78±0.01 h 16.83 h 16.899±0.001 h 16.900±0.003 h
- Geometric albedo: 0.04±0.03; 0.042±0.027; 0.049±0.001; 0.0494 (derived)
- Spectral type: Tholen = C SMASS = Xc; B–V = 0.683; U–B = 0.341
- Absolute magnitude (H): 7.21 · 7.21±0.02 · 7.45 · 7.47 · 7.58±0.31

375 Ursula, provisional designation 1893 AL, is a dark asteroid and parent body of the Ursula family from the outer regions of the asteroid belt. It is one of the largest asteroids with a diameter of approximately 200 kilometers. It was discovered on 18 September 1893, by French astronomer Auguste Charlois at Nice Observatory in France. The referent of the asteroids's name is unknown.

== Orbit and classification ==
Ursula is the parent body of the Ursula family (631), a large family of C- and X-type asteroids. It orbits the Sun in the outer asteroid belt at a distance of 2.8–3.5 AU once every 5 years and 6 months (2,016 days; semi-major axis of 3.12 AU). Its orbit has an eccentricity of 0.11 and an inclination of 16° with respect to the ecliptic. The body's observation arc begins at Vienna Observatory in October 1893, three weeks after its official discovery observation at Nice.

== Physical characteristics ==
In the Tholen classification, Ursula is a carbonaceous C-type asteroid, while in the SMASS taxonomy, it is a Xc-subtype that transitions to the X-type asteroids.

=== Rotation period ===
In January 2017, the so-far best-rated rotational lightcurve of Ursula was obtained from photometric observations by American astronomer Frederick Pilcher at the Organ Mesa Observatory (G50), New Mexico. Lightcurve analysis gave a rotation period of 16.899 hours with a brightness amplitude of 0.11 magnitude (U=3).

=== Diameter and albedo ===
According to the surveys carried out by the Japanese Akari satellite and the NEOWISE mission of NASA's Wide-field Infrared Survey Explorer, Ursula measures between 189.45 and 215.67 kilometers in diameter and its surface has an albedo between 0.04 and 0.049.

Observations of an occultation on 15 November 1984, produced six chords indicating an estimated diameter of 216±10 km. The Collaborative Asteroid Lightcurve Link derives an albedo of 0.0494 and adopts a diameter of 216.1 kilometers based on an absolute magnitude of 7.21.

== Naming ==
Any reference of this minor planet's name to a person or occurrence is unknown.

=== Unknown referent ===
Among the many thousands of named minor planets, Ursula is one of only 120 for which no official naming citation has been published. All of these asteroids have low numbers between 164 Eva and 1514 Ricouxa and were discovered between 1876 and the 1930s, predominantly by astronomers Auguste Charlois, Johann Palisa, Max Wolf and Karl Reinmuth.
