= 29 Amphitrite =

Main-belt asteroid

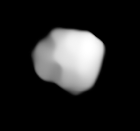
- VLT image of Amphitrite

Discovery
- Discovered by: A. Marth
- Discovery site: London
- Discovery date: 1 March 1854

Designations
- Pronunciation: /æmfɪˈtraɪtiː/
- Named after: Amphitrite (Greek mythology)
- Alternative designations: A899 NG
- Minor planet category: main-belt · (middle) background
- Adjectives: Amphitritean /ˌæmfɪtrɪˈtiːən/, /ˌæmfɪˈtraɪtiən/
- Symbol: (historical)

Orbital characteristics
- Epoch 17.0 October 2024 (JD 2460600.5)
- Uncertainty parameter 0
- Observation arc: 169.16 yr (61,784 d)
- Aphelion: 2.7425 AU
- Perihelion: 2.3664 AU
- Semi-major axis: 2.5544 AU
- Eccentricity: 0.0736
- Orbital period (sidereal): 4.08 yr (1491 d)
- Mean anomaly: 48.40°
- Mean motion: 0° 14^{m} 29.04^{s} / day
- Inclination: 6.0772°
- Longitude of ascending node: 356.26°
- Time of perihelion: 29 April 2028
- Argument of perihelion: 62.01°
- Earth MOID: 1.38454 AU
- Jupiter MOID: 2.48544 AU
- T_{Jupiter}: 3.427

Physical characteristics
- Dimensions: 222 × 209 × 183 km (± 6 × 6 × 5 km)
- Mean diameter: 204±2 km
- Mass: (1.27±0.20)×10^{19} kg (composite estimate) Individual estimates: (1.357±0.015)×10^{19} kg (Note: Calculated from its standard gravitational parameter GM = 0.906±0.010 km^{3}/s^{2}.); (1.26±0.02)×10^{19} kg; 1.344+0.032 −0.028×10^{19} kg (Note: Calculated in kilograms from its value in solar masses: 0.676+0.016 −0.014×10^{−11} M_{☉}.)
- Mean density: 2.86±0.45 g/cm^{3} Other estimates: 3.05±0.10 g/cm^{3} (Note: Assuming a diameter of 204 ± 2 km.); 2.83±0.10 g/cm^{3}; 2.51±0.39 g/cm^{3} (Note: Assuming a diameter of 217 ± 11 km.)
- Synodic rotation period: 5.390119±0.000001 h
- Axial tilt: 116°
- Pole ecliptic longitude: 323°±2°
- Pole ecliptic latitude: −29°±2°
- Geometric albedo: 0.194; 0.157±0.035; 0.1793±0.012; 0.195; 0.216±0.043
- Spectral type: S
- Absolute magnitude (H): 5.85; 5.97; 6.1

29 Amphitrite is one of the largest S-type asteroids, approximately 200 kilometers (120 miles) in diameter, and probably fifth largest after Eunomia, Juno, Iris and Herculina.

== Discovery ==
Amphitrite was discovered by Albert Marth on 1 March 1854, at the private South Villa Observatory, in Regent's Park, London. It was Marth's only asteroid discovery. Its name was chosen by George Bishop, the owner of the observatory, who named it after Amphitrite, a sea goddess in Greek mythology. Its historical symbol was a shell and star; it was encoded in Unicode 17.0 as U+1CECF 𜻏.

== Characteristics ==
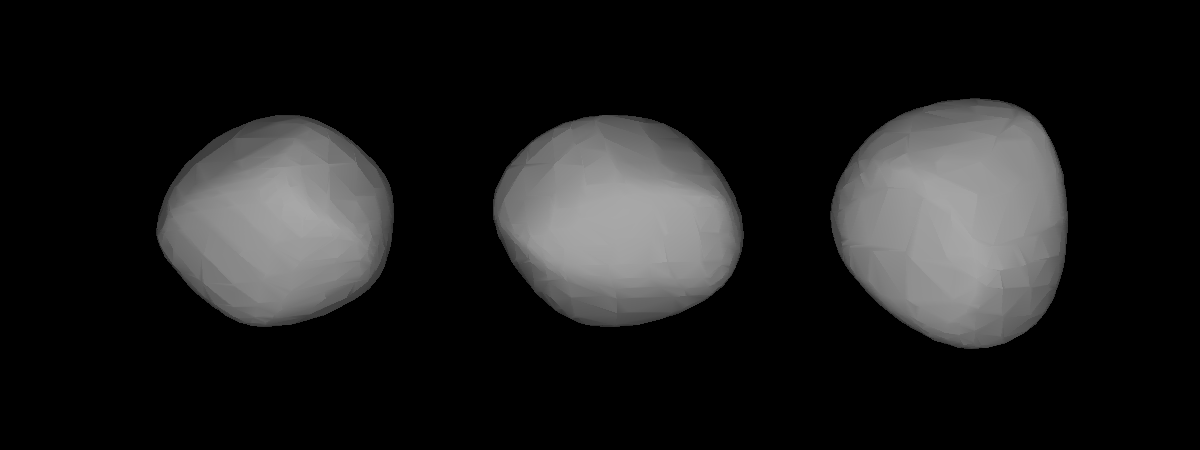
Lightcurve-based 3D model of Amphitrite

Amphitrite's orbit is less eccentric and inclined than those of its larger cousins; indeed, it is the most circular of any asteroid discovered up to that point. As a consequence, it never becomes as bright as Iris or Hebe, especially as it is much further from the Sun than those asteroids. It can reach magnitudes of around +8.6 at a favorable opposition, but usually is around the binocular limit of +9.5.

In 2007, James Baer and Steven R. Chesley estimated Amphitrite to have a mass of 1.9×10^{19} kg. A 2008 estimate by Baer suggests it has a mass of 1.18×10^{19} kg.

A satellite of the asteroid is suspected to exist, based on lightcurve data collected by Edward F. Tedesco. In 1988 a search for satellites or dust orbiting this asteroid was performed using the UH88 telescope at the Mauna Kea Observatories, but neither were found.

== Proposed exploration ==
In 1984, while determining the Galileo mission's prelaunch trajectory to Jupiter, JPL engineers found out that if the spacecraft was launched in May 1986, it could perform a flyby of 29 Amphitrite at a distance of 6,200 mi (10,000 km) on 6 December 1986. However, with the Challenger disaster delaying the launch to October 1989, the flyby was ultimately cancelled.
