= 52 Europa =

Large asteroid in the asteroid belt

- VLT-SPHERE image of Europa

Discovery
- Discovered by: H. Goldschmidt
- Discovery date: 4 February 1858

Designations
- Pronunciation: /jʊˈroʊpə/
- Named after: Europa
- Alternative designations: 1948 LA
- Minor planet category: Main belt
- Adjectives: Europan, Europian

Orbital characteristics
- Epoch July 1, 2021 (JD 2,459,396.5, heliocentric)
- Aphelion: 3.442 AU (515 million km)
- Perihelion: 2.746 AU (411 million km)
- Semi-major axis: 3.094 AU (463 million km)
- Eccentricity: 0.1125
- Orbital period (sidereal): 5.443 yr (1989 d)
- Mean anomaly: 21°
- Inclination: 7.48°
- Longitude of ascending node: 128.57°
- Argument of perihelion: 342.80°

Physical characteristics
- Dimensions: (378±14 × 336±14 × 255±12) km(379±16 × 330±8 × 249±10) km
- Mean diameter: 319±4 km 315±7 km
- Volume: (1.59±0.10)×10^{7} km^{3}
- Mass: (2.39±0.38)×10^{19} kg (composite estimate) Individual estimates: (2.656±0.024)×10^{19} kg (Note: Calculated from its standard gravitational parameter GM = 1.773±0.016 km^{3}/s^{2}.); (2.76±0.03)×10^{19} kg; (3.004±0.097)×10^{19} kg) (Note: Calculated in kilograms from its value in solar masses: (1.511±0.049)×10^{−11} M_{☉}.)
- Mean density: 1.41±0.23 g/cm^{3} Other estimates: 1.56±0.06 g/cm^{3} (Note: Assuming a diameter of 319 ± 4 km.); 1.62±0.06 g/cm^{3}; 1.87±0.31 g/cm^{3} (Note: Assuming a diameter of 313 ± 16 km.)
- Synodic rotation period: 5.629954±0.000001 h
- Axial tilt: 56°
- Pole ecliptic longitude: 255° ± 2°
- Pole ecliptic latitude: 40° ± 2°
- Geometric albedo: 0.052; 0.057±0.007 (0.679±0.017 BV, 0.338±0.028 UB)
- Temperature: ~173 K max: 258 K (−15 °C)
- Spectral type: CF (Tholen); C (SMASSII)
- Absolute magnitude (H): 6.31; 6.65

52 Europa is the sixth-largest asteroid in the asteroid belt, having a diameter of over 300 km, though it is not correspondingly massive. It is shaped like an ellipsoid with approximate dimensions of 378 × 336 × 255 km. It was discovered on 4 February 1858, by Hermann Goldschmidt from his balcony in Paris. It is named after Europa, one of Zeus's conquests in Greek mythology, a name it shares with Jupiter's moon Europa.

== Orbit ==
Animation of 52 Europa's orbit 2000–2020 Sun · Earth · Mars · Jupiter · 52 Europa

Europa is a main belt asteroid that orbits the Sun at a distance of 2.746–3.442 astronomical units (AU) with a semi-major axis or average orbital distance of 3.094 AU once every 5.44 years (for reference, Ceres's orbit is at 2.77 AU).

Europa's orbit has an eccentricity of 0.1125 and an inclination of 7.482° with respect to the ecliptic.

== Physical characteristics ==
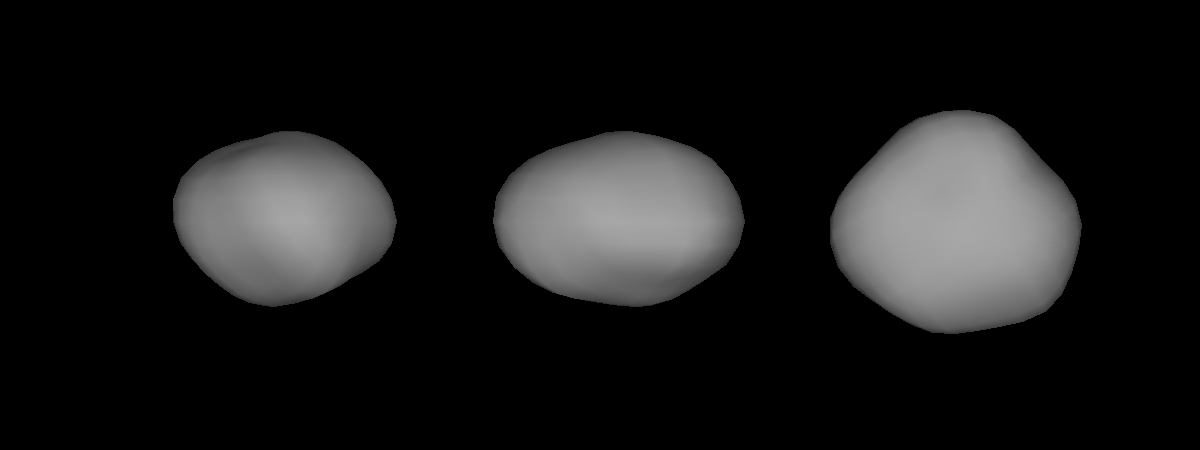
3D model of Europa based on lightcurve modeling

Europa is approximately the sixth largest asteroid by volume. It has a density of around 1.5 g/cm^{3}, typical of C-type asteroids. In 2007, James Baer and Steven R. Chesley estimated Europa to have a mass of (1.9±0.4)×10^{19} kg. A more recent estimate by Baer suggests it has a mass of 3.27×10^{19} kg.

Europa is a very dark carbonaceous C-type, and is the second largest of this group. Spectroscopic studies have found evidence of olivines and pyroxenes on the surface, and there is some indication that there may be compositional differences between different regions. It orbits close to the Hygiea asteroid family, but is not a member.

Lightcurve data for Europa have been particularly tricky to interpret, so much so that for a long time its period of rotation was in dispute (ranging from 5 1/2 hours to 11 hours), despite numerous observations. It had been determined that Europa is a prograde rotator, but the exact direction in which its pole points remained ambiguous. The most detailed analysis now indicates that it points towards ecliptic coordinates (β, λ) = (40°, 255°) with a 2° uncertainty. This gives an axial tilt of about 56°.

In 1988 a search for satellites or dust orbiting this asteroid was performed using the UH88 telescope at the Maunakea Observatories, but the effort came up empty.

== Observations ==
The reputed cataclysmic variable star CV Aquarii, discovered in 1934 by Emily Hughes at Harvard College Observatory, was actually a misidentification of 52 Europa.

== Bibliography ==
- PDS lightcurve data
- Sawyer, S. R. (1991). A High-Resolution CCD Spectroscopic Survey of Low-Albedo Main Belt Asteroids PhD thesis (Thesis). The University of Texas. Bibcode:1991PhDT.......105S.
- Schmeer, P., and M. L. Hazen, CV Aquarii identified with (52) Europa, Journal of the American Association of Variable Star Observers, Vol. 28, p. 103 (2000).
