= 1111 Reinmuthia =

Very elongated asteroid from the background population

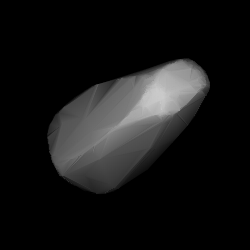
- Shape model of Reinmuthia from its lightcurve

Discovery
- Discovered by: K. Reinmuth
- Discovery site: Heidelberg Obs.
- Discovery date: 11 February 1927

Designations
- Named after: Karl Reinmuth (the discoverer)
- Alternative designations: 1927 CO · 1929 QG
- Minor planet category: main-belt · (outer); background

Orbital characteristics
- Epoch 4 September 2017 (JD 2458000.5)
- Uncertainty parameter 0
- Observation arc: 90.72 yr (33,137 days)
- Aphelion: 3.2947 AU
- Perihelion: 2.6911 AU
- Semi-major axis: 2.9929 AU
- Eccentricity: 0.1008
- Orbital period (sidereal): 5.18 yr (1,891 days)
- Mean anomaly: 329.12°
- Mean motion: 0° 11^{m} 25.44^{s} / day
- Inclination: 3.8917°
- Longitude of ascending node: 132.44°
- Argument of perihelion: 236.17°

Physical characteristics
- Mean diameter: 24.38±0.48 km 41.26 km (derived)
- Synodic rotation period: 4.00742±0.00005 h 4.007347 h 4.00750±0.00003 h 4.0075±0.0001 h (Note: Lightcurve plot of (1111) Reinmuthia, by H. & H. Hamanowa (2009) from observations at the Hamanowa Astronomical Observatory (D91). Rotation period 4.0075±0.0001 hours (0.166979 days) and a brightness amplitude of 0.945±0.005 mag. Summary figures at the LCDB); 4.02 h
- Pole ecliptic latitude: (356.0°, 68.0°) (λ_{1}/β_{1}); (153.0°, 78.0°) (λ_{2}/β_{2})
- Geometric albedo: 0.057 (assumed); 0.167±0.008
- Spectral type: Tholen = FXU: B–V = 0.639±0.016; U–B = 0.230±0.030
- Absolute magnitude (H): 10.65 · 10.67

1111 Reinmuthia (provisional designation: 1927 CO) is a very elongated asteroid from the background population, located in the outer region of the asteroid belt. It was discovered on 11 February 1927, by German astronomer Karl Reinmuth at the Heidelberg Observatory in southwest Germany. The F-type asteroid (FX) has a short rotation period of 4.02 hours and measures approximately 40 kilometers (25 miles) in diameter. It was later named in honor of Karl Reinmuth, the discoverer himself.

== Orbit and classification ==
Reinmuthia is a non-family asteroid of the main belt's background population when applying the hierarchical clustering method to its proper orbital elements. It orbits the Sun in the outer asteroid belt at a distance of 2.7–3.3 AU once every 5 years and 2 months (1,891 days; semi-major axis of 2.99 AU). Its orbit has an eccentricity of 0.10 and an inclination of 4° with respect to the ecliptic. The body's observation arc begins at Heidelberg with its official discovery observation.

== Naming ==
This minor planet was named after its discoverer, Karl Reinmuth (1892–1979), a German astronomer at the Heidelberg-Königstuhl State Observatory and a prolific discoverer of minor planets. In total, he discovered 395 asteroids, most of them during the 1920s and 1930s, which was a unique record for many years. His discoveries include 1862 Apollo and 69230 Hermes, two lost asteroids and near-Earth objects as well as several large Jupiter trojans. His 1931-discovered asteroid (11435) 1931 UB is the oldest discovered yet still unnamed asteroid. The official naming citation was mentioned in The Names of the Minor Planets by Paul Herget in 1955 (H 104).

== Physical characteristics ==
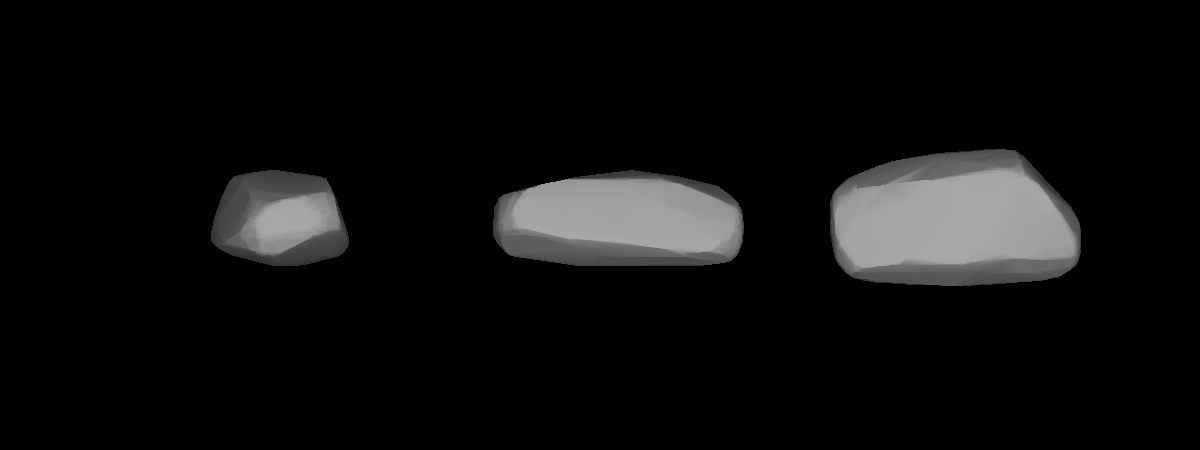
Lightcurve-based 3D inversion model of Reinmuthia

In the Tholen classification, Reinmuthia has an ambiguous spectral type, closest to that of a dark F-type and somewhat similar to an X-type asteroid. The spectrum had also been flagged as "unusual" and "nosy" by Tholen (FXU:).

=== Rotation period ===
Rotational lightcurves of Reinmuthia have been obtained from photometric observations by American astronomer Richard Binzel as well as by Hiromi and Hiroko Hamanowa at the Hamanowa Astronomical Observatory (D91) in Japan (U=3/3/3). Lightcurve analysis gave a consolidated, well-defined rotation period of 4.02 hours with a high brightness amplitude between 0.61 and 0.95 magnitude (U=3).

=== Poles and shape ===
Lightcurve inversion also modeled the body's shape and poles. In 2013, modelling by an international study using photometric data from the US Naval Observatory, the Uppsala Asteroid Photometric Catalogue, the Palomar Transient Factory and the Catalina Sky Survey gave a similar sidereal period of 4.007347 hours and two spin axes of (356.0°, 68.0°) and (153.0°, 78.0°) in ecliptic coordinates (λ, β). The body's very elongated shape had already been indicated by the high brightness variation measured during the photometric observations.

=== Diameter and albedo ===
According to the survey carried out by the Japanese Akari satellite, Reinmuthia measures 24.38 kilometers in diameter and its surface has an albedo of 0.167. The Collaborative Asteroid Lightcurve Link assumes a standard albedo for carbonaceous asteroids of 0.057 and derives a diameter of 41.26 kilometers based on an absolute magnitude of 10.65.
