= 7 Iris =

Large main-belt asteroid

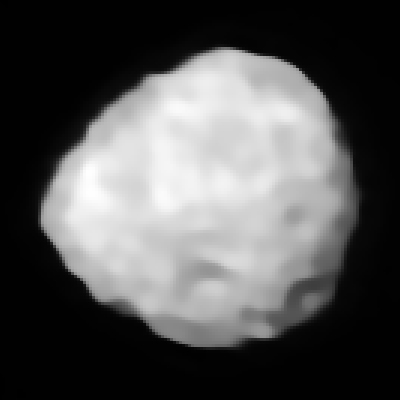
- Iris imaged by the Very Large Telescope in 2017

Discovery
- Discovered by: John Russell Hind
- Discovery date: 13 August 1847

Designations
- Pronunciation: /ˈaɪrɪs/
- Named after: Īris
- Alternative designations: 1847 PA
- Minor planet category: Main belt
- Adjectives: Iridian /ɪˈrɪdiən, aɪ-/
- Symbol: (historical)

Orbital characteristics
- Epoch 13 September 2023 (JD 2453300.5)
- Aphelion: 2.935 AU (439.1 million km)
- Perihelion: 1.838 AU (275.0 million km)
- Semi-major axis: 2.387 AU (357.1 million km)
- Eccentricity: 0.22977
- Orbital period (sidereal): 3.69 a (1346.8 d)
- Average orbital speed: 19.03 km/s
- Mean anomaly: 207.9°
- Inclination: 5.519°
- Longitude of ascending node: 259.5°
- Time of perihelion: 4 April 2025
- Argument of perihelion: 145.4°
- Earth MOID: 0.85 AU (127 million km)

Proper orbital elements
- Proper semi-major axis: 2.3862106 AU
- Proper eccentricity: 0.2125516
- Proper inclination: 6.3924857°
- Proper mean motion: 97.653672 deg / yr
- Proper orbital period: 3.6865 yr (1346.493 d)
- Precession of perihelion long.: 38.403324 arcsec / yr
- Precession of asc. node: −46.447128 arcsec / yr

Physical characteristics
- Dimensions: 260 × 225 × 150 km (± 5 × 4 × 18 km)
- Mean diameter: 199±10 km
- Surface area: (1.33±0.13)×10^{5} km^{2} (Note: Calculated from its asphericity of 0.0645.)
- Volume: (4.13±0.62)×10^{6} km^{3} (Note: Calculated from its equivalent-volume sphere with a diameter of 199 ± 10 km.)
- Mass: (1.35±0.23)×10^{19} kg (composite estimate) (1.456±0.018)×10^{19} kg (Note: Calculated from its standard gravitational parameter GM = 0.972±0.012 km^{3}/s^{2}.)
- Mean density: 3.26±0.74 g/cm^{3} 3.53±0.53 g/cm^{3}
- Equatorial surface gravity: 0.098 m/s²
- Equatorial escape velocity: 0.14 km/s
- Synodic rotation period: 7.138843(1) h
- Axial tilt: 72°
- Pole ecliptic longitude: 20° ± 3°
- Pole ecliptic latitude: 23° ± 3°
- Geometric albedo: 0.279; 0.2766±0.030
- Temperature: ~171 K max: 275 K (+2°C)
- Spectral type: S
- Apparent magnitude: 6.7 to 11.4
- Absolute magnitude (H): 5.51; 5.70
- Angular diameter: 0.32" to 0.07"

7 Iris is a large main-belt asteroid and possible remnant planetesimal orbiting the Sun between Mars and Jupiter. It is the fourth-brightest object in the asteroid belt. 7 Iris is classified as an S-type asteroid, meaning that it has a stony composition.

== Discovery and name ==
Iris was discovered on 13 August 1847, by John R. Hind from London, England. It was Hind's first asteroid discovery and the seventh asteroid to be discovered overall. It was named after the rainbow goddess Iris in Greek mythology, who was a messenger to the gods, especially Hera. Her quality of attendant of Hera was particularly appropriate to the circumstances of discovery, as Iris was spotted following 3 Juno by less than an hour of right ascension (Juno is the Roman equivalent of Hera).

Iris's original symbol was a rainbow and a star: or more simply. It was encoded in Unicode 17.0 as U+1CEC1 𜻁.

== Characteristics ==
Size comparison: the first 10 asteroids profiled against Earth's Moon. Iris is fourth from the right.

=== Geology ===
Iris is an S-type asteroid. The surface is bright and is probably a mixture of nickel-iron metals and magnesium- and iron-silicates. Its spectrum is similar to that of L and LL chondrites with corrections for space weathering, so it may be an important contributor of these meteorites. Planetary dynamics also indicates that it should be a significant source of meteorites.

Among the S-type asteroids, Iris ranks fifth in mean diameter after Eunomia, Juno, Amphitrite and Herculina. Its shape is consistent with an oblate spheroid with a large equatorial excavation, suggesting it is a remnant planetesimal. No collisional family can be associated with Iris, likely because the excavating impact occurred early in the history of the Solar System, and the debris has since dispersed.

=== Brightness ===
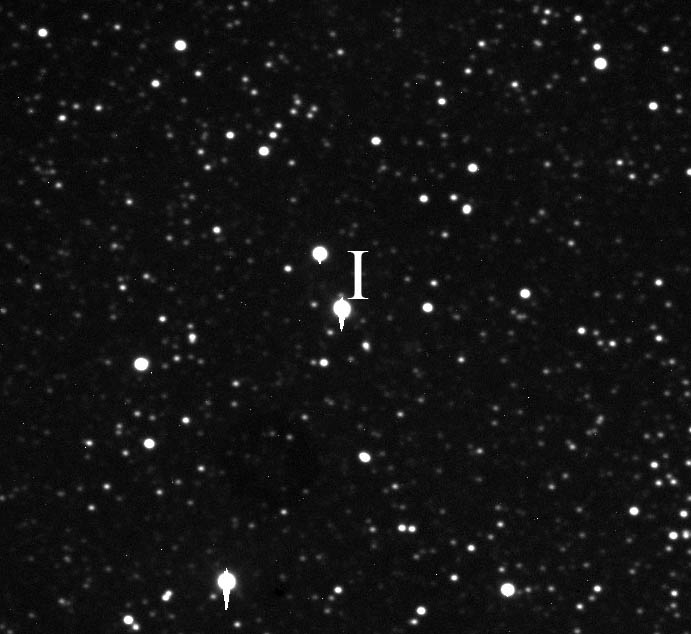
Star rich field showing asteroid Iris (apmag 10.1)

Iris's bright surface and small distance from the Sun make it the fourth-brightest object in the asteroid belt after Vesta, Ceres, and Pallas. It has a mean opposition magnitude of +7.8, comparable to that of Neptune, and can easily be seen with binoculars at most oppositions. At typical oppositions it marginally outshines the larger though darker Pallas. But at rare oppositions near perihelion Iris can reach a magnitude of +6.7 (last time on 31 October 2017, reaching a magnitude of +6.9), which is as bright as Ceres ever gets.

=== Surface features ===
A study by Hanus et al. using data from the VLT's SPHERE instrument names eight craters 20 to 40 km in diameter, and seven recurring features of unknown nature that remain nameless due to a lack of consistency and their occurrence on the edge of Iris. The names are Greek names of colors, corresponding to the rainbow as the sign of Iris. It is unknown whether these names are under consideration by the IAU. The other 7 features are labeled A through G.

Named craters on Iris
Feature	Pronunciation	Greek	Meaning
Chloros	/ˈkloʊrɒs/	χλωρός	'green'
Chrysos	/ˈkraɪsɒs/	χρῡσός	'gold'
Cirrhos	/ˈsɪrɒs/	κιρρός	'orange' (Note: κιρρός is variously translated. The OED has 'orange-tawny'. The color coding of the proposers in their crater maps, however, is simply orange.)
Cyanos	/ˈsaɪənɒs/	κύανος	'blue'
Erythros	/ˈɛrɪθrɒs/	ἐρυθρός	'red'
Glaucos	/ˈɡlɔːkɒs/	γλαυκός	'grey' (Note: Or greyish blue-green.)
Porphyra	/ˈpɔːrfɪrə/	πορφύρα	'purple'
Xanthos	/ˈzænθɒs/	ξανθός	'yellow'

=== Rotation ===
Iris has a rotational period of 7.14 hours. Iris's north pole points towards the ecliptic coordinates (λ, β) estimated to be (20°, +23°) with a 3° uncertainty. This gives an axial tilt of 72°, so that on much of each hemisphere, the sun does not set during summer, and does not rise during winter. On an airless body this gives rise to very large temperature differences.

== Observations ==
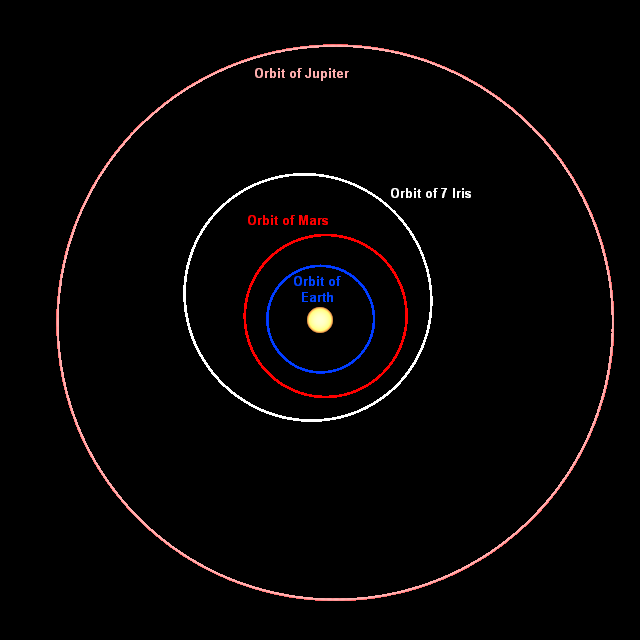
The orbit of 7 Iris compared with the orbits of Earth, Mars and Jupiter

Iris was observed occulting a star on 26 May 1995, and later on 25 July 1997. Both observations gave a diameter of about 200 km.

In February 2024, water molecules were discovered on 7 Iris, alongside 20 Massalia, marking the first time water molecules were detected on asteroids.

== See also ==
- List of former planets
