= 496 Gryphia =

Main-belt asteroid

Discovery
- Discovered by: Max Wolf
- Discovery site: Heidelberg
- Discovery date: 25 October 1902

Designations
- Pronunciation: /ˈɡrɪfiə/
- Alternative designations: 1902 KH; 1931 TB; 1931 TN2; 1933 FQ; 1936 CB; 1951 WS2

Orbital characteristics
- Epoch 31 July 2016 (JD 2457600.5)
- Uncertainty parameter 0
- Observation arc: 112.79 yr (41198 d)
- Aphelion: 2.3726 AU (354.94 Gm)
- Perihelion: 2.0255 AU (303.01 Gm)
- Semi-major axis: 2.1990 AU (328.97 Gm)
- Eccentricity: 0.078917
- Orbital period (sidereal): 3.26 yr (1191.1 d)
- Mean anomaly: 267.309°
- Mean motion: 0° 18^{m} 8.064^{s} / day
- Inclination: 3.7916°
- Longitude of ascending node: 207.608°
- Argument of perihelion: 258.567°

Physical characteristics
- Mean radius: 7.735±0.55 km
- Synodic rotation period: 18.0 h (0.75 d)
- Geometric albedo: 0.1676±0.027
- Absolute magnitude (H): 11.61

496 Gryphia is an S-type asteroid belonging to the Flora family in the Main Belt. Its diameter is about 15 km and it has an albedo of 0.168.

This object has a very low rate of spin, requiring 44.67 days (1,072 h) to complete a full rotation.
