= 423 Diotima =

Main-belt asteroid

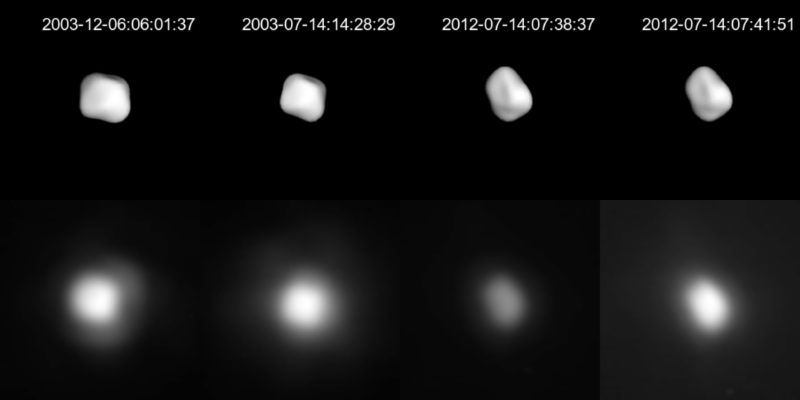
- Lightcurve-based 3D model of Diotima on the top with an image of the asteroid on the bottom

Discovery
- Discovered by: Auguste Charlois
- Discovery date: 7 December 1896

Designations
- Pronunciation: /daɪ.əˈtaɪmə/
- Named after: Diotima of Mantinea (Διοτίμα Diotīma)
- Alternative designations: 1896 DB
- Minor planet category: Main belt
- Adjectives: Diotimean /daɪ.ɒtəˈmiːən/, Diotimian /daɪ.əˈtɪmiən/

Orbital characteristics
- Epoch 31 July 2016 (JD 2457600.5)
- Uncertainty parameter 0
- Observation arc: 116.96 yr (42719 d)
- Aphelion: 3.18523 AU (476.504 Gm)
- Perihelion: 2.95026 AU (441.353 Gm)
- Semi-major axis: 3.06774 AU (458.927 Gm)
- Eccentricity: 0.038297
- Orbital period (sidereal): 5.37 yr (1962.6 d)
- Mean anomaly: 237.495°
- Mean motion: 0° 11^{m} 0.355^{s} / day
- Inclination: 11.2304°
- Longitude of ascending node: 69.4710°
- Argument of perihelion: 200.103°

Physical characteristics
- Dimensions: 171 km × 138 km
- Mean diameter: 205 ± 7 km (ADAM)
- Mass: (6.79±0.31)×10^{18} kg (Note: Calculated from its standard gravitational parameter GM = 0.453±0.021 km^{3}/s^{2}.)
- Mean density: 1.50±0.17 g/cm^{3} (calculated)
- Synodic rotation period: 4.775377(2) h
- Pole ecliptic longitude: 354° ± 2°
- Pole ecliptic latitude: 0° ± 2°
- Geometric albedo: 0.067±0.015
- Spectral type: C
- Absolute magnitude (H): 7.42

423 Diotima is one of the larger main-belt asteroids. It is classified as a C-type asteroid and is probably composed of primitive carbonaceous material.

It was discovered by Auguste Charlois on 7 December 1896, in Nice. In the late 1990s, a network of astronomers worldwide gathered lightcurve data that was ultimately used to derive the spin states and shape models of 10 new asteroids, including 423 Diotima. The light curve for this asteroid varies "a lot" depending on the position, with the brightness variations ranging from almost zero to up to 0.2 in magnitude. Dunham (2002) used 15 chords and obtained an estimated size of 171 km × 138 km.

== Name ==
Diotima is named for Diotima of Mantinea, a priestess who was one of Socrates's teachers. It is one of seven of Charlois's discoveries that was expressly named by the Astromomisches Rechen-Institut (Astronomical Calculation Institute).

The name is stressed on the penultimate syllable, /daɪ.əˈtaɪmə/ dy-ə-TY-mə, as in Latin Diotīma.
