= (75482) 1999 XC173 =

Vestian asteroid

(75482) 1999 XC_{173}
Discovery
- Discovered by: LINEAR
- Discovery site: Lincoln Lab's ETS
- Discovery date: 10 December 1999

Designations
- Alternative designations: 2001 KY_{49}
- Minor planet category: main-belt · Vestian

Orbital characteristics
- Epoch 4 September 2017 (JD 2458000.5)
- Uncertainty parameter 0
- Observation arc: 16.82 yr (6,143 days)
- Aphelion: 2.5436 AU
- Perihelion: 2.1844 AU
- Semi-major axis: 2.3640 AU
- Eccentricity: 0.0760
- Orbital period (sidereal): 3.63 yr (1,328 days)
- Mean anomaly: 310.28°
- Mean motion: 0° 16^{m} 16.32^{s} / day
- Inclination: 6.1205°
- Longitude of ascending node: 58.882°
- Argument of perihelion: 48.553°

Physical characteristics
- Dimensions: 2.96 km (calculated)
- Synodic rotation period: 1234.1709±89.9916 h
- Geometric albedo: 0.20 (assumed)
- Spectral type: S
- Absolute magnitude (H): 14.5 · 14.557±0.004 (R) · 15.01

(75482) 1999 XC_{173} is a stony Vestian asteroid and an exceptionally slow rotating body from the inner regions of the asteroid belt, approximately 3 kilometers in diameter. It was discovered on 10 December 1999, by LINEAR at Lincoln Laboratory's Experimental Test Site in Socorro, New Mexico, United States.

== Classification and orbit ==
The body is classified as a S-type member of the Vesta family by the Collaborative Asteroid Lightcurve Link's Light Curve Data Base (LCDB) . It orbits the Sun at a distance of 2.2–2.5 AU once every 3 years and 8 months (1,328 days). Its orbit has an eccentricity of 0.08 and an inclination of 6° with respect to the ecliptic. A first precovery was obtained at the discovering observatory in October 1999, extending the asteroid's observation arc by 2 months prior to its official discovery observation.

== Physical characteristics ==
A rotational lightcurve was obtained for this asteroid from photometric observations at the Californian Palomar Transient Factory in September 2013. It gave a rotation period of 1234 hours with an estimated error margin of ±90 hours. As of 2016, it is the 6th slowest rotating minor planet known to exist. Its high brightness variation of 0.69 magnitude indicates that it has a non-spheroidal shape (U=2).

According to the LCDB, the body's surface has an assumed standard albedo for stony asteroids of 0.20 and a calculated diameter of 2.96 kilometers with an absolute magnitude of 15.01.

== Numbering and naming ==
This minor planet was numbered by the Minor Planet Center on 15 April 2004. As of 2018, it has not been named.
