= 11885 Summanus =

Near-Earth asteroid

Discovery
- Discovered by: Spacewatch
- Discovery site: Kitt Peak Obs.
- Discovery date: 25 September 1990

Designations
- Pronunciation: /sʌˈmeɪnəs/
- Named after: Summānus
- Minor planet category: NEO · Apollo

Orbital characteristics
- Epoch 4 September 2017 (JD 2458000.5)
- Uncertainty parameter 0
- Observation arc: 20.54 yr (7,504 days)
- Aphelion: 2.5119 AU
- Perihelion: 0.8950 AU
- Semi-major axis: 1.7035 AU
- Eccentricity: 0.4746
- Orbital period (sidereal): 2.22 yr (812 days)
- Mean anomaly: 346.75°
- Mean motion: 0° 26^{m} 35.88^{s} / day
- Inclination: 19.419°
- Longitude of ascending node: 359.89°
- Argument of perihelion: 116.07°
- Earth MOID: 0.0689 AU (26.8 LD)

Physical characteristics
- Mean diameter: 1.298±0.446 km
- Synodic rotation period: 7.358 h
- Geometric albedo: 0.033±0.029
- Absolute magnitude (H): 18.5

11885 Summanus (prov. designation: 1990 SS) is a dark asteroid and large near-Earth object of the Apollo group. It was discovered by astronomers with the Spacewatch programm at Kitt Peak Observatory on 25 September 1990. The object has a rotation period of 7.3 hours and measures approximately 1.3 kilometers (0.8 miles) in diameter. It was named after Summanus, the Roman deity of nocturnal lightning and thunder.

== Discovery and naming ==
Summanus was discovered on 25 September 1990, by Spacewatch survey at the Kitt Peak Observatory, southwest of Tucson, Arizona, United States. It was the first fully automatic discovery of a near-Earth asteroid. The name Summanus is symbolic of the discovery of the asteroid by software running on a (lightning-fast) computer.

== Orbit ==
The orbit is well-established with over 20 years of observations. Summanus orbits the Sun in the inner main-belt at a distance of 0.9–2.5 AU once every 2 years and 3 months (812 days). Its orbit has an eccentricity of 0.47 and an inclination of 19° with respect to the ecliptic.

The closest approach to the Earth in the years 1900–2200 is 0.102 AU (15,300,000 km; 9,500,000 mi) on 17 March 1991, and 17 March 2011. For comparison, the distance to the Moon is about 0.0026 AU (390,000 km; 240,000 mi).
