= 787 Moskva =

Main-belt asteroid

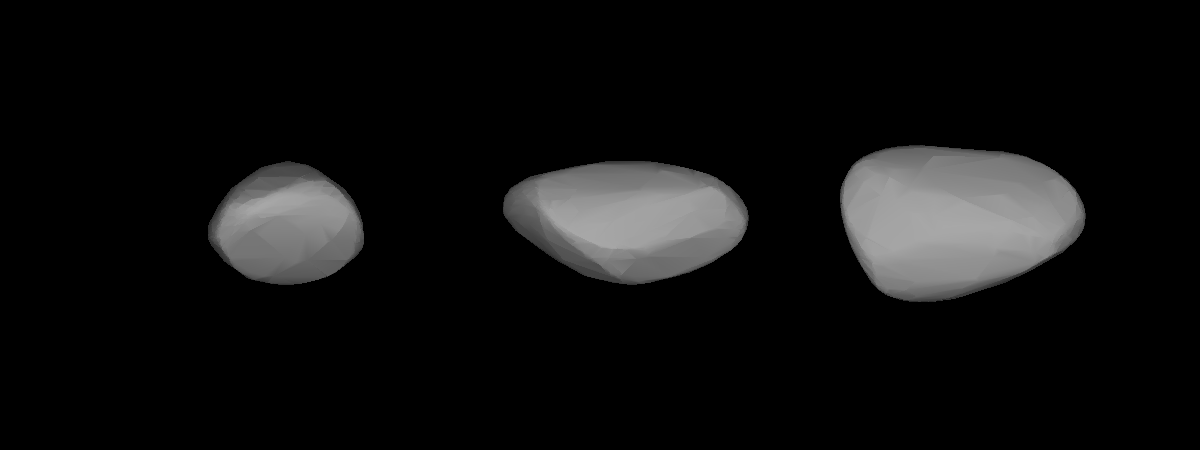
- A three-dimensional model of 787 Moskva based on its light curve

Discovery
- Discovered by: G. N. Neujmin
- Discovery site: Simeis
- Discovery date: 20 April 1914

Designations
- Pronunciation: /mɒskˈvɑː/ mosk-VAH
- Alternative designations: 1914 UQ

Orbital characteristics
- Epoch 31 July 2016 (JD 2457600.5)
- Uncertainty parameter 0
- Observation arc: 100.47 yr (36695 d)
- Aphelion: 2.8690 AU (429.20 Gm)
- Perihelion: 2.2090 AU (330.46 Gm)
- Semi-major axis: 2.5390 AU (379.83 Gm)
- Eccentricity: 0.12996
- Orbital period (sidereal): 4.05 yr (1477.7 d)
- Mean anomaly: 18.5642°
- Mean motion: 0° 14^{m} 37.032^{s} / day
- Inclination: 14.852°
- Longitude of ascending node: 183.890°
- Argument of perihelion: 126.135°

Physical characteristics
- Mean radius: 13.755±1.4 km
- Synodic rotation period: 6.056 h (0.2523 d)
- Geometric albedo: 0.2559±0.062
- Absolute magnitude (H): 9.7

787 Moskva is a minor planet orbiting the Sun. It is a dynamic member of the Maria asteroid family orbiting near the 3:1 Kirkwood gap. This is an S-type (stony) asteroid spanning 27 km. The surface mineralogy is consistent with mesosiderite silicates.

Object 1914 UQ, discovered 20 April 1914 by Grigory Neujmin, was named 787 Moskva, after the capital of Russia, Moscow (and retains that name to this day). Object 1934 FD discovered on 19 March 1934 by C. Jackson was given the sequence number 1317. In 1938, G. N. Neujmin found that asteroid 1317 and 787 Moskva were, in fact, the same object. Sequence number 1317 was later reused for the object 1935 RC discovered on 1 September 1935 by Karl Reinmuth; that object is now known as 1317 Silvretta.

Photometric observations at the Palmer Divide Observatory in Colorado Springs, Colorado in 1999 were used to build a light curve for this object. The asteroid displayed a rotation period of 6.056 ± 0.001 hours and a brightness variation of 0.62 ± 0.01 in magnitude.
