= 846 Lipperta =

Main-belt asteroid

Discovery
- Discovered by: Gyllenberg, K. Bergedorf
- Discovery date: 26 November 1916

Designations
- Minor planet category: Main belt

Orbital characteristics
- Epoch 31 July 2016 (JD 2457600.5)
- Uncertainty parameter 0
- Observation arc: 99.23 yr (36245 d)
- Aphelion: 3.6963 AU (552.96 Gm) (Q)
- Perihelion: 2.5562 AU (382.40 Gm) (q)
- Semi-major axis: 3.1262 AU (467.67 Gm) (a)
- Eccentricity: 0.18235 (e)
- Orbital period (sidereal): 5.53 yr (2019.0 d)
- Mean anomaly: 27.575° (M)
- Mean motion: 0° 10^{m} 41.916^{s} / day (n)
- Inclination: 0.26427° (i)
- Longitude of ascending node: 261.44° (Ω)
- Argument of perihelion: 129.22° (ω)

Physical characteristics
- Mean radius: 26.205±0.7 km (IRAS)
- Mass: 1.5×10^{17} kg (assumed)
- Synodic rotation period: 1,641 h (68.4 d)
- Geometric albedo: 0.0506±0.003
- Absolute magnitude (H): 10.26

846 Lipperta is a slowly rotating Themistian asteroid located in the asteroid belt at a distance of 3.1 AU. It has a slow rotation period of 1641 hours making it one of the slowest rotating objects in the solar system discovered.

Based on lightcurve studies, Lipperta has a rotation period of 1641 hours, but this figure is based on less than full coverage, so that the period may be wrong by 30 percent. The lack of variation in brightness could be caused by (a) very slow rotation, (b) near pole-on viewing aspect, or (c) a spherical body with uniform albedo.

It has been claimed that 846 Lipperta may show comet-like activity but this claim is unconfirmed.
