= 2675 Tolkien =

Asteroid

Discovery
- Discovered by: M. Watt
- Discovery site: Anderson Mesa Stn.
- Discovery date: 14 April 1982

Designations
- Named after: J.R.R. Tolkien; (English writer)
- Alternative designations: 1982 GB · 1934 VO; 1937 RH · 1939 FR; 1949 FO · 1950 QA_{1}; 1952 DX · 1969 JE; 1969 KB · 1970 RB; 1973 QX · 1975 BV
- Minor planet category: main-belt · Flora

Orbital characteristics
- Epoch 4 September 2017 (JD 2458000.5)
- Uncertainty parameter 0
- Observation arc: 79.45 yr (29,018 days)
- Aphelion: 2.4386 AU
- Perihelion: 1.9865 AU
- Semi-major axis: 2.2126 AU
- Eccentricity: 0.1022
- Orbital period (sidereal): 3.29 yr (1,202 days)
- Mean anomaly: 96.710°
- Mean motion: 0° 17^{m} 58.2^{s} / day
- Inclination: 2.7535°
- Longitude of ascending node: 5.9040°
- Argument of perihelion: 1.7953°

Physical characteristics
- Dimensions: 9.65±0.23 km; 9.85 km (calculated); 10.960±0.186 km
- Synodic rotation period: 1060±30 h
- Geometric albedo: 0.205±0.011; 0.213±0.021; 0.24 (assumed)
- Spectral type: SMASS = S · S
- Absolute magnitude (H): 12.10 · 12.2 · 12.50 · 12.73±0.27

2675 Tolkien, provisional designation 1982 GB, is a stony Florian asteroid and extremely slow rotator from the inner regions of the asteroid belt, approximately 10 kilometres (6.2 mi) in diameter. It was discovered on 14 April 1982, by British astronomer Martin Watt at Lowell's Anderson Mesa Station in Flagstaff, Arizona, and later named for J. R. R. Tolkien.

== Orbit and classification ==
Tolkien is a member of the Flora family, one of the largest groups of stony asteroids in the main-belt. It orbits the Sun in the inner main-belt at a distance of 2.0–2.4 astronomical units (300,000,000–360,000,000 km; 190,000,000–220,000,000 mi) once every 3 years and 3 months (1,202 days). Its orbit has an eccentricity of 0.10 and an inclination of 3° with respect to the ecliptic.

== Physical characteristics ==
In the SMASS classification, Tolkien is a stony S-type asteroid.

=== Rotation period ===
In February 2011, photometric observations of Tolkien were taken over the course of twenty-three nights. The obtained light curve revealed that the body is potentially an extremely slow rotator, that has an outstandingly long rotation period of 1058±30 hours, or 44 days, with a brightness amplitude of 0.1 magnitude (U=2+). In addition, the body is suspected to be in a non-principal axis rotation ("tumbling").

=== Diameter and albedo ===
According to the surveys carried out by the Japanese Akari satellite and the Wide-field Infrared Survey Explorer with its subsequent NEOWISE mission, the body measures 9.65 and 10.96 kilometres (6.00 and 6.81 mi), and its surface has an albedo of 0.205 and 0.213, respectively, while the Collaborative Asteroid Lightcurve Link assumes an albedo of 0.24 – derived from 8 Flora, the largest member and namesake of this orbital family – and calculates a diameter of 9.85 kilometres (6.12 mi) with an absolute magnitude of 12.2.

== Naming ==
This minor planet was named in honour of J. R. R. Tolkien (1892–1973), an English writer, philologist, and Merton professor of English language at the University of Oxford. He is best known as the author of the fantasy novels The Hobbit and The Lord of the Rings. Tolkien also had a lifelong interest in astronomy. The official naming citation was published by the Minor Planet Center on 1 December 1982 (M.P.C. 7474).
