= (219774) 2001 YY145 =

Main-belt asteroid

(219774) 2001 YY_{145}
Discovery
- Discovered by: LONEOS
- Discovery site: Anderson Mesa Stn.
- Discovery date: 18 December 2001

Designations
- Alternative designations: 2005 TA_{170}
- Minor planet category: main-belt · (middle) background

Orbital characteristics
- Epoch 23 March 2018 (JD 2458200.5)
- Uncertainty parameter 0
- Observation arc: 15.92 yr (5,815 d)
- Aphelion: 2.9215 AU
- Perihelion: 2.2404 AU
- Semi-major axis: 2.5810 AU
- Eccentricity: 0.1320
- Orbital period (sidereal): 4.15 yr (1,515 d)
- Mean anomaly: 48.043°
- Mean motion: 0° 14^{m} 15.72^{s} / day
- Inclination: 9.6001°
- Longitude of ascending node: 315.61°
- Argument of perihelion: 18.718°

Physical characteristics
- Mean diameter: 1.54 km (calculated)
- Synodic rotation period: 1007.6706±86.3718 h
- Geometric albedo: 0.20 (assumed)
- Spectral type: S (assumed)
- Absolute magnitude (H): 15.9; 15.977±0.011 (R); 16.43

(219774) 2001 YY_{145} is a stony background asteroid and exceptionally slow rotator from the central region of the asteroid belt, approximately 1.5 kilometers (0.9 miles) in diameter. It was discovered on 18 December 2001, by astronomers with the Lowell Observatory Near-Earth-Object Search at Anderson Mesa Station near Flagstaff, Arizona, in the United States. The assumed S-type asteroid is likely elongated and has a rarely seen rotation period of 1007 hours, making it the 13th slowest rotator.

== Orbit and classification ==
2001 YY_{145} is a non-family asteroid from the main belt's background population. It orbits the Sun in the central main-belt at a distance of 2.2–2.9 AU once every 4 years and 2 months (1,515 days; semi-major axis of 2.58 AU). Its orbit has an eccentricity of 0.13 and an inclination of 10° with respect to the ecliptic. A first precovery was taken at Lincoln Lab's ETS in October 2001, extending the asteroid's observation arc by 2 months prior to its official discovery observation at Anderson Mesa.

== Physical characteristics ==
The object is an assumed, common S-type asteroid.

=== Slow rotator ===
In October 2013, a rotational lightcurve was obtained of this asteroid from photometric observations in the R-band by astronomers at the Palomar Transient Factory in California. It gave a rotation period of 1007.7 hours – or nearly 42 days – with an assigned error margin of ±86 hours. According to the Light Curve Data Base, it is the 13th slowest rotating minor planet known to exist among more than 15,000 observed small Solar System bodies. Due to its high brightness variation of 0.86 magnitude, the body is likely to have a non-spheroidal shape (U=2). As of 2018, no follow-up observation have been published.

=== Diameter and albedo ===
The Collaborative Asteroid Lightcurve Link assumes a standard albedo for stony asteroids of 0.20 and calculates a diameter of 1.54 kilometers, based on an absolute magnitude of 16.43.

== Numbering and naming ==
This minor planet was numbered by the Minor Planet Center on 4 October 2009. As of 2018, it has not been named.
