= 1449 Virtanen =

Main-belt asteroid

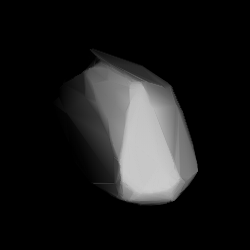
- Shape of Virtanen modelled from its lightcurve

Discovery
- Discovered by: Y. Väisälä
- Discovery site: Turku Obs.
- Discovery date: 20 February 1938

Designations
- Named after: Artturi Virtanen (biochemist)
- Alternative designations: 1938 DO · 1928 DC
- Minor planet category: main-belt · Flora

Orbital characteristics
- Epoch 4 September 2017 (JD 2458000.5)
- Uncertainty parameter 0
- Observation arc: 89.10 yr (32,543 days)
- Aphelion: 2.5378 AU
- Perihelion: 1.9069 AU
- Semi-major axis: 2.2223 AU
- Eccentricity: 0.1419
- Orbital period (sidereal): 3.31 yr (1,210 days)
- Mean anomaly: 289.08°
- Mean motion: 0° 17^{m} 51^{s} / day
- Inclination: 6.6413°
- Longitude of ascending node: 110.78°
- Argument of perihelion: 132.16°

Physical characteristics
- Dimensions: 9.15±1.91 km 9.263±0.098 km 9.46±0.33 km 9.947±0.092 km 10.31 km (calculated)
- Synodic rotation period: 14.770±0.440 h (R); 30.495±0.005 h 30.5±0.5 h 30.5005±0.0005 h 30.5006±0.0001 h 30.52±0.01 h 30.5421±0.7655 h (R); 30.5465±0.3727 h (S)
- Geometric albedo: 0.24 (assumed); 0.285±0.038; 0.2856±0.0274; 0.36±0.15
- Spectral type: Tholen = S · S
- Absolute magnitude (H): 11.690±0.150 (R) · 11.779±0.003 (R) · 12.0 · 12.1 · 12.25 · 12.615±0.004 (S) · 13.21±0.09

1449 Virtanen, provisional designation 1938 DO, is a stony Florian asteroid from the inner regions of the asteroid belt, approximately 9.2 kilometers in diameter. It was discovered on 20 February 1938, by Finnish astronomer Yrjö Väisälä at Turku Observatory in Southwest Finland, and named for Finnish biochemist Artturi Virtanen.

== Description ==
Virtanen is a member of the Flora family, one of the largest collisional populations of stony asteroids in the main-belt. It orbits the Sun in the inner main-belt at a distance of 1.9–2.5 AU once every 3 years and 4 months (1,210 days). Its orbit has an eccentricity of 0.14 and an inclination of 7° with respect to the ecliptic. In 1928, Virtanen was first identified as 1928 DC at Heidelberg, extending the body's observation arc by 10 years prior to its official discovery at Turku.

== Physical characteristics ==
In the Tholen taxonomy, Virtanen is classified as a common S-type asteroid.

=== Lightcurves ===
Virtanen's first rotational lightcurve was obtained by astronomers Pierre Antonini and Silvano Casulli in May 2007, followed by Australian astronomer Julian Oey at Leura (E17) and Kingsgrove Observatory (E19) in June 2008. The lightcurves gave a rotation period of approximately 30.5 hours with a brightness variation of 0.6 magnitude (U=2-/3-/3-).

Additional periods were obtained from photometric observation in the R and S-band at the Palomar Transient Factory (U=2/2/2), and from modeled data using the Lowell photometric database and other data sources, which also gave two spin axis of (307.0°, 58.0°) and (89.0°, 61.0°) in ecliptic coordinates, respectively (U=n.a.).

=== Diameter and albedo ===
According to the survey carried out by NASA's Wide-field Infrared Survey Explorer with its subsequent NEOWISE mission, Virtanen measures between 9.15 and 9.947 kilometers in diameter, and its surface has an albedo between 0.285 and 0.36.

The Collaborative Asteroid Lightcurve Link assumes an albedo of 0.24 – derived from 8 Flora, the largest member and namesake of its family – and calculates a diameter of 10.31 kilometers with an absolute magnitude of 12.1.

== Naming ==
This minor planet was named for famous Finnish biochemist Artturi Virtanen (1895–1973), recipient of the 1945 Nobel Prize in Chemistry and president of the Academy of Finland for many years. The official naming citation was published by the Minor Planet Center on 15 February 1970 (M.P.C. 3023).
