= F-type asteroid =

Type of carbonaceous asteroid

F-type asteroids are a relatively uncommon type of carbonaceous asteroid, falling into the wider C-group.

== Characteristics ==
F-type asteroids have spectra generally similar to those of the B-type asteroids, but lack the "water" absorption feature around 3 μm indicative of hydrated minerals, and differ in the low wavelength part of the ultraviolet spectrum below 0.4 μm.

The F-type and B-type asteroids are not distinguishable with the criteria used in the SMASS classification, so in that scheme are grouped together under the B-type.

== See also ==
- Asteroid spectral types
