= 15 Eunomia =

Stony main-belt asteroid

- VLT-SPHERE image of Eunomia

Discovery
- Discovered by: Annibale de Gasparis
- Discovery site: Naples Obs.
- Discovery date: 29 July 1851

Designations
- Pronunciation: /juːˈnoʊmiə/
- Named after: Eunomia
- Minor planet category: Main belt; Eunomia family
- Adjectives: Eunomian /juːˈnoʊmiən/
- Symbol: (historical)

Orbital characteristics
- Epoch 21 November 2025 (JD 2461000.5)
- Uncertainty parameter 0
- Observation arc: 174.18 yr
- Aphelion: 3.13834 AU
- Perihelion: 2.14603 AU
- Semi-major axis: 2.64219 AU
- Eccentricity: 0.187781
- Orbital period (sidereal): 4.29490 yr (1568.71 d)
- Mean anomaly: 113.726°
- Inclination: 11.7614°
- Longitude of ascending node: 292.881°
- Argument of perihelion: 98.5072°
- Jupiter MOID: 2.4255 AU
- T_{Jupiter}: 3.340

Proper orbital elements
- Proper semi-major axis: 2.64357 AU
- Proper eccentricity: 0.14887
- Proper inclination: 13.109°
- Precession of perihelion long.: 42.698 arcsec / yr
- Precession of asc. node: -52.044 arcsec / yr

Physical characteristics
- Dimensions: 340 × 248 × 229 km (± 14 × 13 × 14 km)
- Mean diameter: 270±3 km
- Mass: (3.05±0.19)×10^{19} kg (composite estimate) Individual estimates: (3.119±0.024)×10^{19} kg (Note: Calculated from its standard gravitational parameter GM = 2.082±0.016 km^{3}/s^{2}.); (2.69±0.05)×10^{19} kg; 3.026+0.093 −0.101×10^{19} kg (Note: Siltala and Granvik reported Eunomia's mass as 1.522+0.047 −0.051×10^{−11} Solar masses (M_{☉}), where 1 M_{☉} is 1.988×10^{30} kg)
- Mean density: 2.96±0.21 g/cm^{3} Other estimates: 3.03±0.10 g/cm^{3} (Note: Assuming a diameter of 270 ± 3 km.); 2.61±0.10 g/cm^{3}; 3.49±0.55 g/cm^{3} (Note: Assuming a diameter of 255 ± 13 km.)
- Sidereal rotation period: 6.082753±0.000001 h
- Axial tilt: −11° to orbit (retrograde)
- Pole ecliptic longitude: 355°±2°
- Pole ecliptic latitude: −70°±2°
- Geometric albedo: 0.187; 0.248±0.042; 0.163±0.030
- Spectral type: S-type asteroid U−B=0.451±0.019; B−V=0.839±0.015
- Apparent magnitude: 7.9 to 11.24
- Absolute magnitude (H): 5.42; 5.28
- Angular diameter: 0.29″ to 0.085″

15 Eunomia is a large asteroid in the middle asteroid belt. It is the largest of the stony (S-type) asteroids, with a mean diameter of about 270 kilometres (170 mi). It is between the eight and twelfth largest main belt asteroid, containing about 1% of its mass. It was discovered on 29 July 1851 by astronomer Annibale de Gasparis, who chose to name the asteroid after the Greek goddess Eunomia. It is elongated and irregular in shape, and rotates once every six hours and five minutes.

Eunomia is the largest member of the Eunomia family, one of the largest known asteroid families in the main belt. Asteroids of the Eunomia family share orbital and compositional similarities to Eunomia itself.

== History ==
=== Discovery ===
Eunomia was discovered by Italian astronomer Annibale de Gasparis on the night of 29 July 1851 at Naples Observatory in Naples, Italy. There, while observing around the 18th hour of right ascension just below the ecliptic, he spotted a starlike object with a magnitude of 9. Though the object's low position in the sky prevented de Gasparis from observing it as thoroughly, he concluded that it was a "new planet" and reported his discovery in a letter to A.C. Petersen in Altona, Germany. Petersen in turn announced de Gasparis's discovery in the journal Astronomische Nachrichten on 22 August 1851.

=== Naming and symbol ===
De Gasparis selected the name Eunomia after Eunomia of Greek mythology, who was one of the Horae and the personification of law and order. He described its symbol as a star above a heart: (U+1CEC8 𜻈 in Unicode 17.0).

== Orbit ==
Eunomia orbits the Sun at an average distance—its semi-major axis—of 2.64 astronomical units (AU), taking 4.29 Earth years to complete one revolution. It is located in the middle main asteroid belt, and its orbit is inclined by 11.8° with respect to the ecliptic. Due to its orbital eccentricity of 0.19, its distance from the Sun ranges from 2.15 AU at perihelion to 3.14 AU at aphelion.

== Eunomia family ==
Eunomia is the largest member of the Eunomia family, comprising an estimated ~70% of its mass. The Eunomia family is one of the largest asteroid families known, with 13099 identified members. It occupies the middle main belt, with an outer boundary at the 8:3 mean-motion resonance with Jupiter and an inner boundary at a series of secular resonances. Its members orbit with relatively high eccentricities and inclinations. Most members are stony S-type asteroids, though A-type asteroids are more common than average in the family.

Around 20% of asteroids located within the Eunomia family region are spectrally dissimilar interlopers. Most of these interlopers belong to the overlapping Adeona family, whose namesake is the C-type asteroid 145 Adeona.

== Rotation ==
Eunomia has a sidereal day of 6 hours and 5 minutes, which was determined from analyzing its lightcurve, or variations in its observed brightness. It has retrograde spin (clockwise when viewed from north of the ecliptic), rotating in the opposite direction compared to Earth. Its north pole is pointed towards the ecliptic south, with an axial tilt of 20° relative to the ecliptic (11° to its orbital plane).

== Physical characteristics ==
Eunomia is the largest and most massive S-type asteroid, with a volume-equivalent mean diameter of 270 kilometres (170 mi) and an estimated mass of about 3×10^{19} kilograms (6.6×10^{19} lb). Eunomia is between the eighth and twelfth largest asteroid in the main belt and contains about 1% of its mass. It has an estimated density of about 3 g/cm^{3}. It is elongated, irregular, and egg-shaped, with a pointed end and a blunted end.

=== Spectrum and composition ===
Eunomia is classified as a stony S-type asteroid, the second-most common asteroid spectral type. In Michael Gaffey's classification scheme, Eunomia is an S(III)-type, implying the presence of calcium-rich pyroxenes on its surface. Mineralogical studies using astronomical spectroscopy identified the presence of olivine, troilite, and iron–nickel alloy. Its surface is compositionally uneven: the pointed end has olivine and a mineralogy similar to stony-iron meteorites, while the blunt end has iron-rich pyroxenes and basalt.

The variability of Eunomia's surface mineralogy may be a sign that it underwent partial planetary differentiation in its past. The overabundance of A-type asteroids in its family additionally support partial or complete differentiation.

== See also ==
- Former classification of planets
