= List of minor planets: 799001–800000 =

The following is a partial list of minor planets, running from minor-planet number 799001 through 800000, inclusive. The primary data for this and other partial lists is based on JPL's "Small-Body Orbital Elements" and data available from the Minor Planet Center. Critical list information is also provided by the MPC, unless otherwise specified from Lowell Observatory. A detailed description of the table's columns and additional sources are given on the main page including a complete list of every page in this series, and a statistical break-up on the dynamical classification of minor planets.

Also see the summary list of all named bodies in numerical and alphabetical order, and the corresponding naming citations for the number range of this particular list. New namings may only be added to this list after official publication, as the preannouncement of names is condemned by the Working Group for Small Bodies Nomenclature of the International Astronomical Union.

Near-Earth obj.	MBA (inner)	MBA (outer)	Centaur
Mars-crosser	MBA (middle)	Jupiter trojan	Trans-Neptunian obj.
Unclassified

== 799001–799100 ==
Designation			Discovery			Properties		Ref
Permanent	Provisional	Named after	Date	Site	Discoverer(s)	Category	Diam.	Ref
799001	2013 BX_{96}	—	January 17, 2013	Kitt Peak	Spacewatch	·	880 m	MPC · JPL
799002	2013 BZ_{96}	—	January 17, 2013	Haleakala	Pan-STARRS 1	·	2.0 km	MPC · JPL
799003	2013 BB_{97}	—	January 22, 2013	Mount Lemmon	Mount Lemmon Survey	·	2.0 km	MPC · JPL
799004	2013 BH_{98}	—	January 16, 2013	Mount Lemmon	Mount Lemmon Survey	·	1.0 km	MPC · JPL
799005	2013 BQ_{99}	—	March 20, 2002	Kitt Peak	Deep Ecliptic Survey	·	1.6 km	MPC · JPL
799006	2013 BR_{99}	—	January 22, 2013	Mount Lemmon	Mount Lemmon Survey	·	1.9 km	MPC · JPL
799007	2013 BU_{99}	—	January 20, 2013	Kitt Peak	Spacewatch	L4 · HEK	5.8 km	MPC · JPL
799008	2013 BN_{100}	—	January 17, 2013	Kitt Peak	Spacewatch	·	2.2 km	MPC · JPL
799009	2013 BO_{100}	—	January 17, 2013	Haleakala	Pan-STARRS 1	·	2.3 km	MPC · JPL
799010	2013 BM_{101}	—	January 17, 2013	Haleakala	Pan-STARRS 1	EOS	1.2 km	MPC · JPL
799011	2013 BA_{104}	—	January 17, 2013	Haleakala	Pan-STARRS 1	EOS	1.2 km	MPC · JPL
799012	2013 BM_{104}	—	January 18, 2013	Haleakala	Pan-STARRS 1	L4	5.9 km	MPC · JPL
799013	2013 BZ_{104}	—	January 16, 2013	Haleakala	Pan-STARRS 1	HYG	1.9 km	MPC · JPL
799014	2013 BD_{105}	—	January 17, 2013	Kitt Peak	Spacewatch	·	1.8 km	MPC · JPL
799015	2013 BN_{105}	—	January 17, 2013	Haleakala	Pan-STARRS 1	·	1.2 km	MPC · JPL
799016	2013 BW_{105}	—	January 16, 2013	Haleakala	Pan-STARRS 1	·	1.6 km	MPC · JPL
799017	2013 BF_{107}	—	January 22, 2013	Kitt Peak	Spacewatch	·	2.2 km	MPC · JPL
799018	2013 BG_{107}	—	January 17, 2013	Haleakala	Pan-STARRS 1	·	1.8 km	MPC · JPL
799019	2013 BQ_{107}	—	January 17, 2013	Haleakala	Pan-STARRS 1	EOS	1.4 km	MPC · JPL
799020	2013 BP_{108}	—	January 18, 2013	Mount Lemmon	Mount Lemmon Survey	·	1.3 km	MPC · JPL
799021	2013 BR_{108}	—	January 17, 2013	Mount Lemmon	Mount Lemmon Survey	T_{j} (2.97) · EUP	1.9 km	MPC · JPL
799022	2013 BF_{109}	—	January 17, 2013	Haleakala	Pan-STARRS 1	·	2.1 km	MPC · JPL
799023	2013 BL_{109}	—	January 21, 2013	Haleakala	Pan-STARRS 1	·	2.1 km	MPC · JPL
799024	2013 BQ_{109}	—	January 18, 2013	Mount Lemmon	Mount Lemmon Survey	EOS	1.3 km	MPC · JPL
799025	2013 BD_{111}	—	January 16, 2013	Haleakala	Pan-STARRS 1	·	820 m	MPC · JPL
799026	2013 BF_{111}	—	January 20, 2013	Kitt Peak	Spacewatch	L4	6.5 km	MPC · JPL
799027	2013 BG_{111}	—	January 17, 2013	Haleakala	Pan-STARRS 1	L4	6.2 km	MPC · JPL
799028	2013 CX_{7}	—	January 10, 2013	Kitt Peak	Spacewatch	·	2.1 km	MPC · JPL
799029	2013 CQ_{8}	—	January 10, 2013	Kitt Peak	Spacewatch	·	1.9 km	MPC · JPL
799030	2013 CZ_{8}	—	January 10, 2013	Haleakala	Pan-STARRS 1	·	2.0 km	MPC · JPL
799031	2013 CK_{11}	—	January 19, 2013	Kitt Peak	Spacewatch	·	2.1 km	MPC · JPL
799032	2013 CN_{13}	—	February 1, 2013	Kitt Peak	Spacewatch	·	1.8 km	MPC · JPL
799033	2013 CJ_{20}	—	February 3, 2013	Haleakala	Pan-STARRS 1	·	2.4 km	MPC · JPL
799034	2013 CJ_{21}	—	February 3, 2013	Haleakala	Pan-STARRS 1	·	2.3 km	MPC · JPL
799035	2013 CU_{24}	—	February 3, 2013	Haleakala	Pan-STARRS 1	·	1.2 km	MPC · JPL
799036	2013 CZ_{24}	—	February 3, 2013	Haleakala	Pan-STARRS 1	TIR	2.1 km	MPC · JPL
799037	2013 CC_{28}	—	January 10, 2013	Haleakala	Pan-STARRS 1	EUP	2.2 km	MPC · JPL
799038	2013 CF_{33}	—	February 1, 2013	Kitt Peak	Spacewatch	T_{j} (2.97)	2.7 km	MPC · JPL
799039	2013 CB_{38}	—	January 22, 2013	Kitt Peak	Spacewatch	·	1.8 km	MPC · JPL
799040	2013 CP_{41}	—	February 3, 2013	Haleakala	Pan-STARRS 1	·	2.5 km	MPC · JPL
799041	2013 CT_{41}	—	February 3, 2013	Haleakala	Pan-STARRS 1	·	1.9 km	MPC · JPL
799042	2013 CU_{41}	—	February 3, 2013	Haleakala	Pan-STARRS 1	·	2.2 km	MPC · JPL
799043	2013 CP_{63}	—	February 7, 2013	Nogales	M. Schwartz, P. R. Holvorcem	·	1.4 km	MPC · JPL
799044	2013 CS_{63}	—	February 8, 2013	Haleakala	Pan-STARRS 1	·	2.7 km	MPC · JPL
799045	2013 CM_{64}	—	January 20, 2013	Kitt Peak	Spacewatch	LIX	2.8 km	MPC · JPL
799046	2013 CW_{68}	—	February 8, 2013	Haleakala	Pan-STARRS 1	·	1.8 km	MPC · JPL
799047	2013 CJ_{86}	—	January 16, 2013	Haleakala	Pan-STARRS 1	·	1.9 km	MPC · JPL
799048	2013 CT_{87}	—	February 9, 2013	Haleakala	Pan-STARRS 1	·	1.0 km	MPC · JPL
799049	2013 CG_{90}	—	January 4, 2013	Kitt Peak	Spacewatch	THB	2.1 km	MPC · JPL
799050	2013 CY_{92}	—	February 8, 2013	Haleakala	Pan-STARRS 1	L4	5.4 km	MPC · JPL
799051	2013 CV_{93}	—	February 22, 2009	Kitt Peak	Spacewatch	·	920 m	MPC · JPL
799052	2013 CH_{94}	—	February 8, 2013	Haleakala	Pan-STARRS 1	·	1.3 km	MPC · JPL
799053	2013 CJ_{96}	—	February 8, 2013	Haleakala	Pan-STARRS 1	·	1.5 km	MPC · JPL
799054	2013 CL_{96}	—	February 8, 2013	Haleakala	Pan-STARRS 1	·	980 m	MPC · JPL
799055	2013 CM_{96}	—	February 8, 2013	Haleakala	Pan-STARRS 1	·	2.2 km	MPC · JPL
799056	2013 CW_{97}	—	January 17, 2013	Mount Lemmon	Mount Lemmon Survey	·	2.1 km	MPC · JPL
799057	2013 CS_{99}	—	February 8, 2013	Haleakala	Pan-STARRS 1	·	2.2 km	MPC · JPL
799058	2013 CC_{104}	—	February 9, 2013	Haleakala	Pan-STARRS 1	·	2.2 km	MPC · JPL
799059	2013 CV_{107}	—	February 9, 2013	Haleakala	Pan-STARRS 1	TIR	1.9 km	MPC · JPL
799060	2013 CY_{108}	—	February 9, 2013	Haleakala	Pan-STARRS 1	·	1.5 km	MPC · JPL
799061	2013 CL_{118}	—	February 12, 2013	Haleakala	Pan-STARRS 1	AMO	220 m	MPC · JPL
799062	2013 CP_{131}	—	February 14, 2013	Kitt Peak	Spacewatch	AGN	890 m	MPC · JPL
799063	2013 CD_{134}	—	February 15, 2013	Haleakala	Pan-STARRS 1	·	1.3 km	MPC · JPL
799064	2013 CG_{144}	—	February 14, 2013	Kitt Peak	Spacewatch	·	1.2 km	MPC · JPL
799065	2013 CV_{144}	—	February 14, 2013	Mount Lemmon	Mount Lemmon Survey	L4	4.6 km	MPC · JPL
799066	2013 CW_{157}	—	February 2, 2013	Kitt Peak	Spacewatch	·	2.5 km	MPC · JPL
799067	2013 CR_{158}	—	February 14, 2013	Kitt Peak	Spacewatch	·	2.0 km	MPC · JPL
799068	2013 CL_{159}	—	January 19, 2013	Mount Lemmon	Mount Lemmon Survey	·	2.6 km	MPC · JPL
799069	2013 CY_{167}	—	February 14, 2013	Haleakala	Pan-STARRS 1	VER	1.8 km	MPC · JPL
799070	2013 CC_{168}	—	February 14, 2013	Haleakala	Pan-STARRS 1	·	2.1 km	MPC · JPL
799071	2013 CR_{171}	—	February 15, 2013	Haleakala	Pan-STARRS 1	THB	2.0 km	MPC · JPL
799072	2013 CF_{173}	—	February 15, 2013	Haleakala	Pan-STARRS 1	·	1.1 km	MPC · JPL
799073	2013 CP_{185}	—	February 8, 2013	Haleakala	Pan-STARRS 1	LIX	2.5 km	MPC · JPL
799074	2013 CT_{200}	—	February 9, 2013	Haleakala	Pan-STARRS 1	·	2.1 km	MPC · JPL
799075	2013 CS_{202}	—	March 27, 2008	Mount Lemmon	Mount Lemmon Survey	·	1.6 km	MPC · JPL
799076	2013 CW_{204}	—	February 9, 2013	Haleakala	Pan-STARRS 1	·	2.1 km	MPC · JPL
799077	2013 CM_{206}	—	February 8, 2013	Haleakala	Pan-STARRS 1	T_{j} (2.99)	2.3 km	MPC · JPL
799078	2013 CE_{215}	—	February 8, 2013	Haleakala	Pan-STARRS 1	·	1.3 km	MPC · JPL
799079	2013 CO_{216}	—	February 9, 2013	Haleakala	Pan-STARRS 1	(18466)	1.6 km	MPC · JPL
799080	2013 CN_{217}	—	February 8, 2013	Haleakala	Pan-STARRS 1	·	2.2 km	MPC · JPL
799081	2013 CX_{217}	—	February 8, 2013	Haleakala	Pan-STARRS 1	L4	4.8 km	MPC · JPL
799082	2013 CM_{221}	—	January 7, 2013	Oukaïmeden	M. Ory	·	1.8 km	MPC · JPL
799083	2013 CF_{223}	—	February 8, 2013	Haleakala	Pan-STARRS 1	L4	5.3 km	MPC · JPL
799084	2013 CG_{223}	—	February 8, 2013	Haleakala	Pan-STARRS 1	L4	5.2 km	MPC · JPL
799085	2013 CZ_{223}	—	February 15, 2013	Haleakala	Pan-STARRS 1	·	1.4 km	MPC · JPL
799086	2013 CL_{227}	—	February 15, 2013	ESA OGS	ESA OGS	ADE	1.4 km	MPC · JPL
799087	2013 CD_{230}	—	May 21, 2014	Mount Lemmon	Mount Lemmon Survey	·	2.1 km	MPC · JPL
799088	2013 CZ_{231}	—	February 8, 2013	Haleakala	Pan-STARRS 1	·	2.3 km	MPC · JPL
799089	2013 CK_{232}	—	February 6, 2013	Kitt Peak	Spacewatch	·	670 m	MPC · JPL
799090	2013 CO_{232}	—	February 15, 2013	Haleakala	Pan-STARRS 1	·	670 m	MPC · JPL
799091	2013 CB_{233}	—	February 9, 2013	Haleakala	Pan-STARRS 1	·	2.1 km	MPC · JPL
799092	2013 CG_{234}	—	August 9, 2015	Haleakala	Pan-STARRS 1	·	930 m	MPC · JPL
799093	2013 CX_{234}	—	May 4, 2014	Kitt Peak	Spacewatch	·	2.4 km	MPC · JPL
799094	2013 CG_{235}	—	February 15, 2013	Haleakala	Pan-STARRS 1	T_{j} (2.84)	860 m	MPC · JPL
799095	2013 CL_{235}	—	February 8, 2013	Haleakala	Pan-STARRS 1	·	2.4 km	MPC · JPL
799096	2013 CA_{236}	—	September 12, 2015	Haleakala	Pan-STARRS 1	(29841)	1.0 km	MPC · JPL
799097	2013 CC_{237}	—	September 2, 2016	Mount Lemmon	Mount Lemmon Survey	·	2.4 km	MPC · JPL
799098	2013 CG_{238}	—	August 3, 2014	Haleakala	Pan-STARRS 1	NYS	970 m	MPC · JPL
799099	2013 CJ_{238}	—	August 21, 2015	Haleakala	Pan-STARRS 1	(5)	640 m	MPC · JPL
799100	2013 CW_{238}	—	February 14, 2013	Haleakala	Pan-STARRS 1	·	2.6 km	MPC · JPL

== 799101–799200 ==
back to top

Designation			Discovery			Properties		Ref
Permanent	Provisional	Named after	Date	Site	Discoverer(s)	Category	Diam.	Ref
799101	2013 CO_{239}	—	February 15, 2013	Haleakala	Pan-STARRS 1	·	1.8 km	MPC · JPL
799102	2013 CC_{241}	—	February 15, 2013	Haleakala	Pan-STARRS 1	·	2.0 km	MPC · JPL
799103	2013 CX_{241}	—	February 15, 2013	Haleakala	Pan-STARRS 1	·	1.2 km	MPC · JPL
799104	2013 CA_{242}	—	February 14, 2013	Haleakala	Pan-STARRS 1	VER	1.8 km	MPC · JPL
799105	2013 CH_{242}	—	February 14, 2013	Kitt Peak	Spacewatch	·	3.2 km	MPC · JPL
799106	2013 CM_{243}	—	February 14, 2013	Mount Lemmon	Mount Lemmon Survey	·	2.5 km	MPC · JPL
799107	2013 CQ_{243}	—	February 14, 2013	Mount Lemmon	Mount Lemmon Survey	L4	6.5 km	MPC · JPL
799108	2013 CT_{243}	—	February 3, 2013	Haleakala	Pan-STARRS 1	·	1.2 km	MPC · JPL
799109	2013 CQ_{244}	—	February 2, 2013	Mount Lemmon	Mount Lemmon Survey	EUN	780 m	MPC · JPL
799110	2013 CX_{244}	—	February 14, 2013	Haleakala	Pan-STARRS 1	KOR	1.1 km	MPC · JPL
799111	2013 CD_{245}	—	February 15, 2013	Haleakala	Pan-STARRS 1	·	1.5 km	MPC · JPL
799112	2013 CP_{245}	—	February 15, 2013	Haleakala	Pan-STARRS 1	·	2.1 km	MPC · JPL
799113	2013 CJ_{249}	—	February 7, 2013	Kitt Peak	Spacewatch	·	2.1 km	MPC · JPL
799114	2013 CL_{249}	—	February 8, 2013	Haleakala	Pan-STARRS 1	·	2.3 km	MPC · JPL
799115	2013 CO_{250}	—	February 15, 2013	Haleakala	Pan-STARRS 1	·	1.6 km	MPC · JPL
799116	2013 CZ_{250}	—	February 14, 2013	Haleakala	Pan-STARRS 1	·	920 m	MPC · JPL
799117	2013 CB_{251}	—	February 8, 2013	Haleakala	Pan-STARRS 1	·	2.4 km	MPC · JPL
799118	2013 CC_{251}	—	February 10, 2013	Haleakala	Pan-STARRS 1	·	2.3 km	MPC · JPL
799119	2013 CJ_{251}	—	February 15, 2013	Haleakala	Pan-STARRS 1	·	2.3 km	MPC · JPL
799120	2013 CR_{251}	—	February 14, 2013	Kitt Peak	Spacewatch	3:2	3.7 km	MPC · JPL
799121	2013 CB_{252}	—	February 3, 2013	Haleakala	Pan-STARRS 1	·	1.4 km	MPC · JPL
799122	2013 CN_{252}	—	February 8, 2013	Haleakala	Pan-STARRS 1	·	2.0 km	MPC · JPL
799123	2013 CW_{252}	—	February 3, 2013	Haleakala	Pan-STARRS 1	·	2.0 km	MPC · JPL
799124	2013 CT_{253}	—	February 3, 2013	Haleakala	Pan-STARRS 1	·	1.9 km	MPC · JPL
799125	2013 CU_{253}	—	February 3, 2013	Haleakala	Pan-STARRS 1	(1298)	2.2 km	MPC · JPL
799126	2013 CK_{254}	—	February 3, 2013	Haleakala	Pan-STARRS 1	·	2.8 km	MPC · JPL
799127	2013 CT_{254}	—	February 9, 2013	Haleakala	Pan-STARRS 1	L4	5.2 km	MPC · JPL
799128	2013 CY_{254}	—	February 7, 2013	Kitt Peak	Spacewatch	THM	1.8 km	MPC · JPL
799129	2013 CH_{255}	—	February 14, 2013	Haleakala	Pan-STARRS 1	L4	5.4 km	MPC · JPL
799130	2013 CF_{256}	—	February 5, 2013	Kitt Peak	Spacewatch	·	2.1 km	MPC · JPL
799131	2013 CH_{257}	—	February 6, 2013	Kitt Peak	Spacewatch	HOF	1.9 km	MPC · JPL
799132	2013 CL_{257}	—	February 5, 2013	Mount Lemmon	Mount Lemmon Survey	THM	1.6 km	MPC · JPL
799133	2013 CZ_{257}	—	February 13, 2013	Haleakala	Pan-STARRS 1	·	2.5 km	MPC · JPL
799134	2013 CD_{258}	—	February 14, 2013	Kitt Peak	Spacewatch	·	2.2 km	MPC · JPL
799135	2013 CM_{258}	—	February 8, 2013	Haleakala	Pan-STARRS 1	·	2.0 km	MPC · JPL
799136	2013 CO_{258}	—	February 15, 2013	Haleakala	Pan-STARRS 1	·	1.4 km	MPC · JPL
799137	2013 CW_{258}	—	February 9, 2013	Haleakala	Pan-STARRS 1	L4	5.3 km	MPC · JPL
799138	2013 CC_{259}	—	February 5, 2013	Mount Lemmon	Mount Lemmon Survey	·	2.2 km	MPC · JPL
799139	2013 CT_{259}	—	February 13, 2013	Bergisch Gladbach	W. Bickel	THM	1.9 km	MPC · JPL
799140	2013 CL_{261}	—	February 9, 2013	Haleakala	Pan-STARRS 1	·	2.5 km	MPC · JPL
799141	2013 CO_{261}	—	February 14, 2013	Haleakala	Pan-STARRS 1	·	1.9 km	MPC · JPL
799142	2013 CP_{261}	—	February 5, 2013	Mount Lemmon	Mount Lemmon Survey	·	1.9 km	MPC · JPL
799143	2013 CS_{261}	—	February 3, 2013	Haleakala	Pan-STARRS 1	·	1.8 km	MPC · JPL
799144	2013 CE_{262}	—	February 8, 2013	Mount Lemmon	Mount Lemmon Survey	·	2.2 km	MPC · JPL
799145	2013 CS_{262}	—	February 14, 2013	Haleakala	Pan-STARRS 1	·	960 m	MPC · JPL
799146	2013 DM_{6}	—	February 16, 2013	Mount Lemmon	Mount Lemmon Survey	·	2.0 km	MPC · JPL
799147	2013 DU_{6}	—	February 5, 2013	Kitt Peak	Spacewatch	L4	6.5 km	MPC · JPL
799148	2013 DZ_{8}	—	January 19, 2013	Kitt Peak	Spacewatch	·	2.1 km	MPC · JPL
799149	2013 DW_{9}	—	February 1, 2009	Mount Lemmon	Mount Lemmon Survey	·	950 m	MPC · JPL
799150	2013 DP_{12}	—	October 23, 2011	Haleakala	Pan-STARRS 1	·	2.0 km	MPC · JPL
799151	2013 DF_{13}	—	February 17, 2013	Mount Lemmon	Mount Lemmon Survey	LIX	2.5 km	MPC · JPL
799152	2013 DW_{17}	—	May 5, 2014	Mount Lemmon	Mount Lemmon Survey	LIX	2.6 km	MPC · JPL
799153	2013 DU_{19}	—	February 16, 2013	Mount Lemmon	Mount Lemmon Survey	·	2.0 km	MPC · JPL
799154	2013 DY_{19}	—	February 19, 2013	Kitt Peak	Spacewatch	·	1.3 km	MPC · JPL
799155	2013 DC_{20}	—	February 16, 2013	Kitt Peak	Spacewatch	·	1.5 km	MPC · JPL
799156	2013 DL_{22}	—	February 16, 2013	Mount Lemmon	Mount Lemmon Survey	·	2.2 km	MPC · JPL
799157	2013 DM_{23}	—	February 17, 2013	Westfield	International Astronomical Search Collaboration	·	1.9 km	MPC · JPL
799158	2013 EA_{6}	—	April 30, 2009	Kitt Peak	Spacewatch	·	1.4 km	MPC · JPL
799159	2013 EC_{8}	—	March 11, 2005	Mount Lemmon	Mount Lemmon Survey	·	640 m	MPC · JPL
799160	2013 EH_{8}	—	April 26, 2008	Kitt Peak	Spacewatch	·	2.1 km	MPC · JPL
799161	2013 EW_{10}	—	January 25, 2007	Kitt Peak	Spacewatch	THB	1.9 km	MPC · JPL
799162	2013 EY_{10}	—	March 5, 2013	Haleakala	Pan-STARRS 1	·	2.4 km	MPC · JPL
799163	2013 EX_{19}	—	March 3, 2013	Mount Lemmon	Mount Lemmon Survey	·	1.8 km	MPC · JPL
799164	2013 EW_{27}	—	March 6, 2013	Haleakala	Pan-STARRS 1	AMO · APO +1km	950 m	MPC · JPL
799165	2013 EN_{28}	—	February 8, 2013	Haleakala	Pan-STARRS 1	L4	7.2 km	MPC · JPL
799166	2013 EK_{35}	—	March 5, 2013	Haleakala	Pan-STARRS 1	VER	1.7 km	MPC · JPL
799167	2013 EC_{38}	—	March 8, 2013	Haleakala	Pan-STARRS 1	HOF	1.8 km	MPC · JPL
799168	2013 EH_{42}	—	March 6, 2013	Haleakala	Pan-STARRS 1	·	1.4 km	MPC · JPL
799169	2013 EJ_{44}	—	March 6, 2013	Haleakala	Pan-STARRS 1	·	1.9 km	MPC · JPL
799170	2013 EQ_{46}	—	March 6, 2013	Haleakala	Pan-STARRS 1	·	1.3 km	MPC · JPL
799171	2013 EH_{47}	—	March 6, 2013	Haleakala	Pan-STARRS 1	·	910 m	MPC · JPL
799172	2013 EP_{48}	—	March 6, 2013	Haleakala	Pan-STARRS 1	·	1.7 km	MPC · JPL
799173	2013 EO_{49}	—	March 6, 2013	Haleakala	Pan-STARRS 1	·	2.3 km	MPC · JPL
799174	2013 ET_{51}	—	March 8, 2013	Haleakala	Pan-STARRS 1	·	1.4 km	MPC · JPL
799175	2013 EA_{53}	—	March 8, 2013	Haleakala	Pan-STARRS 1	T_{j} (2.92)	2.1 km	MPC · JPL
799176	2013 EP_{53}	—	March 8, 2013	Haleakala	Pan-STARRS 1	·	1.5 km	MPC · JPL
799177	2013 EK_{54}	—	October 1, 2010	Kitt Peak	Spacewatch	·	1.4 km	MPC · JPL
799178	2013 EU_{59}	—	March 8, 2013	Haleakala	Pan-STARRS 1	VER	1.9 km	MPC · JPL
799179	2013 EW_{60}	—	October 26, 2011	Haleakala	Pan-STARRS 1	HOF	1.8 km	MPC · JPL
799180	2013 EE_{61}	—	February 17, 2007	Kitt Peak	Spacewatch	·	1.9 km	MPC · JPL
799181	2013 EG_{71}	—	March 7, 2013	Mount Lemmon	Mount Lemmon Survey	·	1.2 km	MPC · JPL
799182	2013 EY_{72}	—	May 16, 2009	Mount Lemmon	Mount Lemmon Survey	·	1.5 km	MPC · JPL
799183	2013 EY_{73}	—	March 7, 2013	Mount Lemmon	Mount Lemmon Survey	3:2	3.7 km	MPC · JPL
799184	2013 EQ_{74}	—	March 7, 2013	Mount Lemmon	Mount Lemmon Survey	MAR	680 m	MPC · JPL
799185	2013 EN_{78}	—	March 8, 2013	Haleakala	Pan-STARRS 1	·	2.2 km	MPC · JPL
799186	2013 EN_{92}	—	November 21, 2005	Kitt Peak	Spacewatch	·	2.8 km	MPC · JPL
799187	2013 EL_{98}	—	March 8, 2013	Haleakala	Pan-STARRS 1	·	2.3 km	MPC · JPL
799188	2013 EM_{98}	—	March 8, 2013	Haleakala	Pan-STARRS 1	NEM	1.6 km	MPC · JPL
799189	2013 EO_{101}	—	February 14, 2013	Kitt Peak	Spacewatch	·	1.4 km	MPC · JPL
799190	2013 EU_{104}	—	March 12, 2013	Mount Lemmon	Mount Lemmon Survey	·	1.1 km	MPC · JPL
799191	2013 EW_{117}	—	March 14, 2013	Mount Lemmon	Mount Lemmon Survey	·	2.3 km	MPC · JPL
799192	2013 EH_{122}	—	February 10, 2008	Kitt Peak	Spacewatch	BRA	1.0 km	MPC · JPL
799193	2013 ES_{128}	—	March 13, 2013	Palomar Mountain	Palomar Transient Factory	·	1.2 km	MPC · JPL
799194	2013 EN_{131}	—	August 12, 2010	Kitt Peak	Spacewatch	·	1.3 km	MPC · JPL
799195	2013 EQ_{135}	—	March 12, 2013	Kitt Peak	Research and Education Collaborative Occultation Network	(5)	820 m	MPC · JPL
799196	2013 EC_{137}	—	March 13, 2013	Kitt Peak	Research and Education Collaborative Occultation Network	·	1.1 km	MPC · JPL
799197	2013 EX_{137}	—	March 13, 2013	Kitt Peak	Research and Education Collaborative Occultation Network	L4	5.6 km	MPC · JPL
799198	2013 EA_{141}	—	January 10, 2013	Haleakala	Pan-STARRS 1	EOS	1.2 km	MPC · JPL
799199	2013 EX_{155}	—	April 13, 2013	Haleakala	Pan-STARRS 1	·	1.4 km	MPC · JPL
799200	2013 EK_{157}	—	March 17, 2013	Mount Lemmon	Mount Lemmon Survey	EOS	1.4 km	MPC · JPL

== 799201–799300 ==
back to top

Designation			Discovery			Properties		Ref
Permanent	Provisional	Named after	Date	Site	Discoverer(s)	Category	Diam.	Ref
799201	2013 EQ_{157}	—	March 13, 2013	Mount Lemmon	Mount Lemmon Survey	NYS	920 m	MPC · JPL
799202	2013 EN_{160}	—	March 6, 2013	Haleakala	Pan-STARRS 1	·	760 m	MPC · JPL
799203	2013 EG_{162}	—	March 3, 2013	Mount Lemmon	Mount Lemmon Survey	·	400 m	MPC · JPL
799204	2013 EP_{163}	—	March 5, 2013	Haleakala	Pan-STARRS 1	(69559)	2.2 km	MPC · JPL
799205	2013 ES_{163}	—	March 8, 2013	Haleakala	Pan-STARRS 1	·	2.5 km	MPC · JPL
799206	2013 ET_{164}	—	March 13, 2013	Mount Lemmon	Mount Lemmon Survey	·	1.7 km	MPC · JPL
799207	2013 EW_{164}	—	March 6, 2013	Sandlot	G. Hug	EUP	2.1 km	MPC · JPL
799208	2013 EO_{165}	—	March 8, 2013	Haleakala	Pan-STARRS 1	·	2.0 km	MPC · JPL
799209	2013 ET_{165}	—	August 10, 2016	Haleakala	Pan-STARRS 1	VER	1.9 km	MPC · JPL
799210	2013 ED_{171}	—	March 5, 2013	Haleakala	Pan-STARRS 1	·	1.4 km	MPC · JPL
799211	2013 EO_{171}	—	March 3, 2013	Mount Lemmon	Mount Lemmon Survey	·	2.2 km	MPC · JPL
799212	2013 EZ_{171}	—	March 5, 2013	Haleakala	Pan-STARRS 1	·	1.2 km	MPC · JPL
799213	2013 EF_{172}	—	March 8, 2013	Haleakala	Pan-STARRS 1	KOR	1.1 km	MPC · JPL
799214	2013 EH_{172}	—	March 8, 2013	Haleakala	Pan-STARRS 1	THM	2.0 km	MPC · JPL
799215	2013 EZ_{173}	—	March 15, 2013	Mount Lemmon	Mount Lemmon Survey	KOR	1.2 km	MPC · JPL
799216	2013 EH_{177}	—	March 5, 2013	Mount Lemmon	Mount Lemmon Survey	·	2.4 km	MPC · JPL
799217	2013 EA_{178}	—	March 15, 2013	Kitt Peak	Spacewatch	·	2.1 km	MPC · JPL
799218	2013 EL_{178}	—	March 5, 2013	Haleakala	Pan-STARRS 1	·	2.2 km	MPC · JPL
799219	2013 EW_{179}	—	March 6, 2013	Haleakala	Pan-STARRS 1	·	1.8 km	MPC · JPL
799220	2013 EY_{179}	—	March 5, 2013	Haleakala	Pan-STARRS 1	·	2.1 km	MPC · JPL
799221	2013 EC_{180}	—	March 7, 2013	Mount Lemmon	Mount Lemmon Survey	·	2.6 km	MPC · JPL
799222	2013 EG_{180}	—	March 13, 2013	Haleakala	Pan-STARRS 1	·	880 m	MPC · JPL
799223	2013 EO_{180}	—	March 3, 2013	Mount Lemmon	Mount Lemmon Survey	URS	2.2 km	MPC · JPL
799224	2013 EP_{182}	—	March 5, 2013	Mount Lemmon	Mount Lemmon Survey	·	1.7 km	MPC · JPL
799225	2013 EF_{184}	—	March 15, 2013	Mount Lemmon	Mount Lemmon Survey	·	2.8 km	MPC · JPL
799226	2013 EJ_{184}	—	March 5, 2013	Mount Lemmon	Mount Lemmon Survey	·	1.9 km	MPC · JPL
799227	2013 EB_{185}	—	March 3, 2013	Mount Lemmon	Mount Lemmon Survey	·	1.4 km	MPC · JPL
799228	2013 EV_{187}	—	January 7, 2017	Mount Lemmon	Mount Lemmon Survey	·	1.6 km	MPC · JPL
799229	2013 EF_{190}	—	March 13, 2013	Mount Lemmon	Mount Lemmon Survey	·	1.1 km	MPC · JPL
799230	2013 FW_{5}	—	May 25, 2009	Kitt Peak	Spacewatch	ADE	1.2 km	MPC · JPL
799231	2013 FP_{6}	—	March 18, 2013	Palomar Mountain	Palomar Transient Factory	EUN	880 m	MPC · JPL
799232	2013 FY_{10}	—	March 19, 2013	Palomar Mountain	Palomar Transient Factory	·	2.3 km	MPC · JPL
799233	2013 FC_{22}	—	March 23, 2013	La Silla	Barbieri, C.	·	930 m	MPC · JPL
799234	2013 FF_{27}	—	March 19, 2013	Haleakala	Pan-STARRS 1	MRX	720 m	MPC · JPL
799235	2013 FD_{34}	—	March 17, 2013	Kitt Peak	Spacewatch	·	1.5 km	MPC · JPL
799236	2013 FJ_{34}	—	April 22, 2009	Mount Lemmon	Mount Lemmon Survey	·	1.0 km	MPC · JPL
799237	2013 FB_{35}	—	March 19, 2013	Haleakala	Pan-STARRS 1	MAR	650 m	MPC · JPL
799238	2013 FG_{35}	—	March 19, 2013	Haleakala	Pan-STARRS 1	·	840 m	MPC · JPL
799239	2013 FA_{36}	—	March 19, 2013	Haleakala	Pan-STARRS 1	·	2.3 km	MPC · JPL
799240	2013 FE_{36}	—	March 18, 2013	Mount Lemmon	Mount Lemmon Survey	·	1.6 km	MPC · JPL
799241	2013 FF_{36}	—	March 19, 2013	Haleakala	Pan-STARRS 1	·	870 m	MPC · JPL
799242	2013 FM_{37}	—	November 30, 2011	Mount Lemmon	Mount Lemmon Survey	·	950 m	MPC · JPL
799243	2013 FG_{38}	—	March 19, 2013	Haleakala	Pan-STARRS 1	KOR	1.0 km	MPC · JPL
799244	2013 FW_{40}	—	March 19, 2013	Haleakala	Pan-STARRS 1	·	1.2 km	MPC · JPL
799245	2013 FB_{42}	—	March 31, 2013	Mount Lemmon	Mount Lemmon Survey	·	1.1 km	MPC · JPL
799246	2013 GE_{6}	—	April 1, 2013	Mount Lemmon	Mount Lemmon Survey	3:2 · SHU	4.1 km	MPC · JPL
799247	2013 GP_{17}	—	March 7, 2013	Mount Lemmon	Mount Lemmon Survey	·	1.3 km	MPC · JPL
799248	2013 GZ_{20}	—	March 13, 2013	Mount Lemmon	Mount Lemmon Survey	·	1.2 km	MPC · JPL
799249	2013 GV_{41}	—	March 16, 2013	Mount Lemmon	Mount Lemmon Survey	KON	1.4 km	MPC · JPL
799250	2013 GA_{44}	—	April 8, 2013	Mount Lemmon	Mount Lemmon Survey	DOR	1.7 km	MPC · JPL
799251	2013 GP_{54}	—	April 10, 2013	Haleakala	Pan-STARRS 1	·	1.2 km	MPC · JPL
799252	2013 GN_{59}	—	March 13, 2013	Mount Lemmon	Mount Lemmon Survey	·	1.6 km	MPC · JPL
799253	2013 GF_{60}	—	April 6, 2013	Mount Lemmon	Mount Lemmon Survey	EOS	1.3 km	MPC · JPL
799254	2013 GP_{64}	—	March 16, 2013	Kitt Peak	Spacewatch	·	2.2 km	MPC · JPL
799255	2013 GV_{77}	—	March 5, 2013	Mount Lemmon	Mount Lemmon Survey	·	1.2 km	MPC · JPL
799256	2013 GJ_{86}	—	July 29, 2005	Palomar Mountain	NEAT	·	1.2 km	MPC · JPL
799257	2013 GT_{89}	—	March 18, 2013	Kitt Peak	Spacewatch	·	1.1 km	MPC · JPL
799258	2013 GF_{90}	—	April 13, 2013	Kitt Peak	Spacewatch	·	960 m	MPC · JPL
799259	2013 GC_{93}	—	April 12, 2013	Haleakala	Pan-STARRS 1	·	890 m	MPC · JPL
799260	2013 GT_{93}	—	April 1, 2013	Mount Lemmon	Mount Lemmon Survey	·	2.8 km	MPC · JPL
799261	2013 GC_{99}	—	March 6, 2017	Mount Lemmon	Mount Lemmon Survey	(194)	1.3 km	MPC · JPL
799262	2013 GN_{99}	—	April 11, 2013	ESA OGS	ESA OGS	·	980 m	MPC · JPL
799263	2013 GG_{102}	—	March 12, 2013	Mount Lemmon	Mount Lemmon Survey	(895)	2.3 km	MPC · JPL
799264	2013 GA_{104}	—	March 26, 2009	Kitt Peak	Spacewatch	·	800 m	MPC · JPL
799265	2013 GC_{121}	—	April 8, 2013	Mount Lemmon	Mount Lemmon Survey	EOS	1.3 km	MPC · JPL
799266	2013 GS_{124}	—	April 10, 2013	Haleakala	Pan-STARRS 1	·	700 m	MPC · JPL
799267	2013 GC_{125}	—	March 16, 2013	Kitt Peak	Spacewatch	·	690 m	MPC · JPL
799268	2013 GN_{133}	—	April 2, 2013	Mount Lemmon	Mount Lemmon Survey	·	2.2 km	MPC · JPL
799269	2013 GR_{133}	—	April 2, 2013	Kitt Peak	Spacewatch	·	780 m	MPC · JPL
799270	2013 GU_{139}	—	April 13, 2013	Haleakala	Pan-STARRS 1	·	800 m	MPC · JPL
799271	2013 GG_{140}	—	April 9, 2013	Haleakala	Pan-STARRS 1	·	1.7 km	MPC · JPL
799272	2013 GL_{142}	—	April 15, 2013	Haleakala	Pan-STARRS 1	BRG	1.1 km	MPC · JPL
799273	2013 GC_{143}	—	April 6, 2013	Mount Lemmon	Mount Lemmon Survey	KON	1.6 km	MPC · JPL
799274	2013 GA_{144}	—	April 9, 2013	Haleakala	Pan-STARRS 1	(18466)	1.5 km	MPC · JPL
799275	2013 GY_{145}	—	April 10, 2013	Haleakala	Pan-STARRS 1	·	760 m	MPC · JPL
799276	2013 GO_{146}	—	April 9, 2013	Haleakala	Pan-STARRS 1	·	830 m	MPC · JPL
799277	2013 GC_{148}	—	September 4, 2014	Haleakala	Pan-STARRS 1	·	1.9 km	MPC · JPL
799278	2013 GA_{149}	—	April 14, 2013	Calar Alto	F. Hormuth	RAF	600 m	MPC · JPL
799279	2013 GZ_{151}	—	April 15, 2013	Haleakala	Pan-STARRS 1	AGN	880 m	MPC · JPL
799280	2013 GB_{158}	—	April 12, 2013	Haleakala	Pan-STARRS 1	RAF	530 m	MPC · JPL
799281	2013 GL_{158}	—	April 15, 2013	Haleakala	Pan-STARRS 1	·	660 m	MPC · JPL
799282	2013 GV_{163}	—	April 2, 2013	Mount Lemmon	Mount Lemmon Survey	·	1.3 km	MPC · JPL
799283	2013 GL_{164}	—	April 10, 2013	Haleakala	Pan-STARRS 1	·	2.8 km	MPC · JPL
799284	2013 GD_{165}	—	April 12, 2013	Haleakala	Pan-STARRS 1	(5)	890 m	MPC · JPL
799285	2013 GA_{167}	—	April 10, 2013	Haleakala	Pan-STARRS 1	·	850 m	MPC · JPL
799286	2013 GM_{167}	—	April 10, 2013	Haleakala	Pan-STARRS 1	·	1.8 km	MPC · JPL
799287	2013 GF_{169}	—	April 13, 2013	Haleakala	Pan-STARRS 1	·	2.1 km	MPC · JPL
799288	2013 GX_{170}	—	April 7, 2013	Mount Lemmon	Mount Lemmon Survey	·	1.5 km	MPC · JPL
799289	2013 HO_{3}	—	May 2, 2009	Mount Lemmon	Mount Lemmon Survey	·	750 m	MPC · JPL
799290	2013 HM_{7}	—	April 18, 2013	Mount Lemmon	Mount Lemmon Survey	H	310 m	MPC · JPL
799291	2013 HD_{19}	—	April 29, 2013	San Pedro de Atacama	Oreshko, A.	ADE	1.4 km	MPC · JPL
799292	2013 HX_{37}	—	April 9, 2013	Haleakala	Pan-STARRS 1	·	2.3 km	MPC · JPL
799293	2013 HW_{40}	—	April 16, 2013	Cerro Tololo-DECam	DECam	·	1.1 km	MPC · JPL
799294	2013 HH_{45}	—	September 5, 2010	Mount Lemmon	Mount Lemmon Survey	·	910 m	MPC · JPL
799295	2013 HO_{45}	—	April 16, 2013	Cerro Tololo-DECam	DECam	·	1.1 km	MPC · JPL
799296	2013 HA_{50}	—	April 9, 2013	Haleakala	Pan-STARRS 1	·	790 m	MPC · JPL
799297	2013 HJ_{52}	—	April 16, 2013	Cerro Tololo-DECam	DECam	·	1.2 km	MPC · JPL
799298	2013 HQ_{54}	—	April 11, 2005	Kitt Peak	Spacewatch	·	640 m	MPC · JPL
799299	2013 HJ_{58}	—	April 16, 2013	Cerro Tololo-DECam	DECam	·	1.1 km	MPC · JPL
799300	2013 HZ_{63}	—	April 9, 2013	Haleakala	Pan-STARRS 1	·	880 m	MPC · JPL

== 799301–799400 ==
back to top

Designation			Discovery			Properties		Ref
Permanent	Provisional	Named after	Date	Site	Discoverer(s)	Category	Diam.	Ref
799301	2013 HY_{64}	—	April 16, 2013	Cerro Tololo-DECam	DECam	·	1.8 km	MPC · JPL
799302	2013 HZ_{69}	—	April 9, 2013	Haleakala	Pan-STARRS 1	·	940 m	MPC · JPL
799303	2013 HN_{72}	—	April 16, 2013	Cerro Tololo-DECam	DECam	KOR	770 m	MPC · JPL
799304	2013 HO_{83}	—	April 16, 2013	Cerro Tololo-DECam	DECam	·	1.2 km	MPC · JPL
799305	2013 HF_{84}	—	April 16, 2013	Cerro Tololo-DECam	DECam	·	1.9 km	MPC · JPL
799306	2013 HN_{84}	—	April 16, 2013	Cerro Tololo-DECam	DECam	·	2.3 km	MPC · JPL
799307	2013 HU_{84}	—	April 20, 2009	Mount Lemmon	Mount Lemmon Survey	·	550 m	MPC · JPL
799308	2013 HN_{85}	—	April 16, 2013	Cerro Tololo-DECam	DECam	·	1.9 km	MPC · JPL
799309	2013 HS_{87}	—	November 13, 2010	Mount Lemmon	Mount Lemmon Survey	VER	1.6 km	MPC · JPL
799310	2013 HO_{95}	—	April 16, 2013	Cerro Tololo-DECam	DECam	VER	1.7 km	MPC · JPL
799311	2013 HJ_{97}	—	September 4, 2010	Kitt Peak	Spacewatch	·	1 km	MPC · JPL
799312	2013 HE_{100}	—	April 16, 2013	Cerro Tololo-DECam	DECam	·	1.4 km	MPC · JPL
799313	2013 HR_{103}	—	April 16, 2013	Cerro Tololo-DECam	DECam	PAD	860 m	MPC · JPL
799314	2013 HQ_{110}	—	April 16, 2013	Cerro Tololo-DECam	DECam	·	1.5 km	MPC · JPL
799315	2013 HB_{113}	—	April 16, 2013	Cerro Tololo-DECam	DECam	BRG	1.1 km	MPC · JPL
799316	2013 HW_{113}	—	April 16, 2013	Cerro Tololo-DECam	DECam	·	1.1 km	MPC · JPL
799317	2013 HV_{115}	—	April 10, 2013	Haleakala	Pan-STARRS 1	EOS	1.1 km	MPC · JPL
799318	2013 HF_{121}	—	October 8, 2010	Kitt Peak	Spacewatch	·	1.1 km	MPC · JPL
799319	2013 HG_{122}	—	April 21, 2013	Mount Lemmon	Mount Lemmon Survey	MAR	610 m	MPC · JPL
799320	2013 HY_{129}	—	April 17, 2013	Cerro Tololo-DECam	DECam	·	600 m	MPC · JPL
799321	2013 HW_{135}	—	April 9, 2013	Haleakala	Pan-STARRS 1	HNS	570 m	MPC · JPL
799322	2013 HH_{145}	—	April 16, 2013	Cerro Tololo-DECam	DECam	·	2.0 km	MPC · JPL
799323	2013 HT_{145}	—	April 16, 2013	Cerro Tololo-DECam	DECam	·	1.1 km	MPC · JPL
799324	2013 HK_{150}	—	April 17, 2013	Cerro Tololo-DECam	DECam	·	2.0 km	MPC · JPL
799325	2013 HV_{153}	—	April 20, 2013	Kitt Peak	Heinze, A. N.	·	1.2 km	MPC · JPL
799326	2013 HM_{155}	—	April 20, 2013	Kitt Peak	Heinze, A. N.	·	760 m	MPC · JPL
799327	2013 HS_{155}	—	April 20, 2013	Kitt Peak	Heinze, A. N.	·	1.7 km	MPC · JPL
799328	2013 HJ_{157}	—	April 16, 2013	Haleakala	Pan-STARRS 1	·	3.1 km	MPC · JPL
799329	2013 HZ_{157}	—	April 19, 2013	Haleakala	Pan-STARRS 1	·	750 m	MPC · JPL
799330	2013 HZ_{159}	—	April 20, 2013	Mount Lemmon	Mount Lemmon Survey	·	770 m	MPC · JPL
799331	2013 HY_{163}	—	April 17, 2013	Haleakala	Pan-STARRS 1	·	770 m	MPC · JPL
799332	2013 HB_{164}	—	April 16, 2013	Haleakala	Pan-STARRS 1	·	810 m	MPC · JPL
799333	2013 HG_{164}	—	April 19, 2013	Mount Lemmon	Mount Lemmon Survey	·	1.3 km	MPC · JPL
799334	2013 HB_{165}	—	April 17, 2013	Haleakala	Pan-STARRS 1	KON	1.3 km	MPC · JPL
799335	2013 HD_{165}	—	April 16, 2013	Haleakala	Pan-STARRS 1	·	960 m	MPC · JPL
799336	2013 HH_{165}	—	April 17, 2013	Haleakala	Pan-STARRS 1	·	2.0 km	MPC · JPL
799337	2013 HO_{165}	—	April 18, 2013	Mount Lemmon	Mount Lemmon Survey	EUN	810 m	MPC · JPL
799338	2013 JT_{10}	—	May 7, 2013	Mount Lemmon	Mount Lemmon Survey	·	700 m	MPC · JPL
799339	2013 JQ_{15}	—	May 7, 2013	Mount Lemmon	Mount Lemmon Survey	·	2.8 km	MPC · JPL
799340	2013 JO_{16}	—	March 20, 2007	Mount Lemmon	Mount Lemmon Survey	·	2.0 km	MPC · JPL
799341	2013 JB_{19}	—	April 10, 2013	Mount Lemmon	Mount Lemmon Survey	·	850 m	MPC · JPL
799342	2013 JK_{25}	—	April 10, 2013	Haleakala	Pan-STARRS 1	·	790 m	MPC · JPL
799343	2013 JL_{27}	—	May 6, 2013	Sutherland-LCO A	Lister, T.	H	310 m	MPC · JPL
799344	2013 JN_{32}	—	May 12, 2013	Mount Lemmon	Mount Lemmon Survey	·	1.1 km	MPC · JPL
799345	2013 JM_{45}	—	May 8, 2013	Haleakala	Pan-STARRS 1	·	810 m	MPC · JPL
799346	2013 JB_{56}	—	May 8, 2013	Haleakala	Pan-STARRS 1	·	2.7 km	MPC · JPL
799347	2013 JE_{56}	—	April 19, 2013	Haleakala	Pan-STARRS 1	·	990 m	MPC · JPL
799348	2013 JK_{56}	—	May 8, 2013	Haleakala	Pan-STARRS 1	·	870 m	MPC · JPL
799349	2013 JC_{58}	—	May 2, 2013	Mount Lemmon	Mount Lemmon Survey	·	1.2 km	MPC · JPL
799350	2013 JZ_{61}	—	May 8, 2013	Haleakala	Pan-STARRS 1	·	690 m	MPC · JPL
799351	2013 JP_{63}	—	May 12, 2013	Kitt Peak	Spacewatch	·	2.0 km	MPC · JPL
799352	2013 JA_{67}	—	May 15, 2013	Haleakala	Pan-STARRS 1	·	1.1 km	MPC · JPL
799353	2013 JF_{68}	—	May 12, 2013	Catalina	CSS	·	1.1 km	MPC · JPL
799354	2013 JR_{68}	—	May 2, 2013	Kitt Peak	Spacewatch	MAR	730 m	MPC · JPL
799355	2013 JK_{70}	—	May 15, 2013	Haleakala	Pan-STARRS 1	BRG	1.0 km	MPC · JPL
799356	2013 JD_{71}	—	December 8, 2015	Haleakala	Pan-STARRS 1	·	1.5 km	MPC · JPL
799357	2013 JK_{72}	—	May 12, 2013	Haleakala	Pan-STARRS 1	·	800 m	MPC · JPL
799358	2013 JM_{75}	—	May 12, 2013	Haleakala	Pan-STARRS 1	·	970 m	MPC · JPL
799359	2013 JA_{78}	—	May 8, 2013	Haleakala	Pan-STARRS 1	·	1.6 km	MPC · JPL
799360	2013 JO_{78}	—	May 13, 2013	Mount Lemmon	Mount Lemmon Survey	BRG	950 m	MPC · JPL
799361	2013 JQ_{78}	—	May 8, 2013	Haleakala	Pan-STARRS 1	·	740 m	MPC · JPL
799362	2013 JB_{79}	—	May 7, 2013	Mount Lemmon	Mount Lemmon Survey	·	1.3 km	MPC · JPL
799363	2013 JT_{80}	—	May 9, 2013	Haleakala	Pan-STARRS 1	·	1.9 km	MPC · JPL
799364	2013 JV_{81}	—	May 12, 2013	Haleakala	Pan-STARRS 1	EUN	820 m	MPC · JPL
799365	2013 JN_{83}	—	June 28, 2019	Haleakala	Pan-STARRS 1	ELF	2.1 km	MPC · JPL
799366	2013 KY_{11}	—	May 2, 2013	Haleakala	Pan-STARRS 1	·	1.0 km	MPC · JPL
799367	2013 KO_{13}	—	May 16, 2013	Haleakala	Pan-STARRS 1	·	860 m	MPC · JPL
799368	2013 KF_{20}	—	May 31, 2013	Nogales	M. Schwartz, P. R. Holvorcem	KON	1.7 km	MPC · JPL
799369	2013 KD_{21}	—	May 18, 2013	Mount Lemmon	Mount Lemmon Survey	·	1.7 km	MPC · JPL
799370	2013 KZ_{21}	—	May 19, 2013	Kitt Peak	Spacewatch	·	2.2 km	MPC · JPL
799371	2013 KH_{22}	—	May 16, 2013	Haleakala	Pan-STARRS 1	·	920 m	MPC · JPL
799372	2013 LA_{3}	—	June 1, 2013	Mount Lemmon	Mount Lemmon Survey	·	880 m	MPC · JPL
799373	2013 LM_{3}	—	June 1, 2013	Kitt Peak	Spacewatch	EUN	860 m	MPC · JPL
799374	2013 LU_{6}	—	June 5, 2013	Kitt Peak	Spacewatch	H	360 m	MPC · JPL
799375	2013 LX_{6}	—	July 4, 2005	Palomar Mountain	NEAT	BAR	1.0 km	MPC · JPL
799376	2013 LJ_{12}	—	May 19, 2013	Catalina	CSS	·	1.1 km	MPC · JPL
799377	2013 LS_{12}	—	June 5, 2013	Mount Lemmon	Mount Lemmon Survey	·	760 m	MPC · JPL
799378	2013 LW_{12}	—	June 5, 2013	Mount Lemmon	Mount Lemmon Survey	(5)	870 m	MPC · JPL
799379	2013 LU_{13}	—	June 5, 2013	Mount Lemmon	Mount Lemmon Survey	·	830 m	MPC · JPL
799380	2013 LC_{25}	—	June 8, 2013	Piszkéstető	K. Sárneczky	·	820 m	MPC · JPL
799381	2013 LP_{25}	—	November 11, 2010	Mount Lemmon	Mount Lemmon Survey	·	1.3 km	MPC · JPL
799382	2013 LH_{27}	—	June 6, 2013	Mount Lemmon	Mount Lemmon Survey	·	970 m	MPC · JPL
799383	2013 LC_{32}	—	June 5, 2013	Kitt Peak	Spacewatch	·	1.4 km	MPC · JPL
799384	2013 LQ_{36}	—	October 25, 2005	Kitt Peak	Spacewatch	EUN	760 m	MPC · JPL
799385	2013 LN_{37}	—	June 7, 2013	Oukaïmeden	M. Ory	JUN	740 m	MPC · JPL
799386	2013 LT_{37}	—	June 7, 2013	Haleakala	Pan-STARRS 1	·	890 m	MPC · JPL
799387	2013 LS_{38}	—	June 7, 2013	Haleakala	Pan-STARRS 1	·	780 m	MPC · JPL
799388	2013 LV_{38}	—	June 5, 2013	Mount Lemmon	Mount Lemmon Survey	·	1.2 km	MPC · JPL
799389	2013 LF_{39}	—	June 7, 2013	Mount Lemmon	Mount Lemmon Survey	·	1.1 km	MPC · JPL
799390	2013 LE_{41}	—	June 2, 2013	Mount Lemmon	Mount Lemmon Survey	(5)	1.2 km	MPC · JPL
799391	2013 LF_{42}	—	June 10, 2013	Mount Lemmon	Mount Lemmon Survey	·	1.4 km	MPC · JPL
799392	2013 LB_{43}	—	November 3, 2010	Mount Lemmon	Mount Lemmon Survey	·	880 m	MPC · JPL
799393	2013 LD_{43}	—	June 2, 2013	Mount Lemmon	Mount Lemmon Survey	·	710 m	MPC · JPL
799394	2013 LK_{44}	—	June 4, 2013	Mount Lemmon	Mount Lemmon Survey	·	1.4 km	MPC · JPL
799395	2013 LR_{45}	—	June 4, 2013	Haleakala	Pan-STARRS 1	·	1.1 km	MPC · JPL
799396	2013 LC_{46}	—	June 6, 2013	Mount Lemmon	Mount Lemmon Survey	EUN	710 m	MPC · JPL
799397	2013 LX_{50}	—	January 10, 2021	Mount Lemmon	Mount Lemmon Survey	·	840 m	MPC · JPL
799398	2013 MZ	—	June 18, 2013	Haleakala	Pan-STARRS 1	H	420 m	MPC · JPL
799399	2013 MC_{2}	—	May 30, 2013	Mount Lemmon	Mount Lemmon Survey	·	930 m	MPC · JPL
799400	2013 MZ_{4}	—	June 8, 2013	Mount Lemmon	Mount Lemmon Survey	·	1.5 km	MPC · JPL

== 799401–799500 ==
back to top

Designation			Discovery			Properties		Ref
Permanent	Provisional	Named after	Date	Site	Discoverer(s)	Category	Diam.	Ref
799401	2013 ME_{10}	—	June 30, 2013	Haleakala	Pan-STARRS 1	·	1.4 km	MPC · JPL
799402	2013 MO_{12}	—	June 20, 2013	Haleakala	Pan-STARRS 1	EUN	1.1 km	MPC · JPL
799403	2013 MY_{12}	—	June 18, 2013	Haleakala	Pan-STARRS 1	EUN	920 m	MPC · JPL
799404	2013 MD_{13}	—	June 18, 2013	Haleakala	Pan-STARRS 1	MAR	820 m	MPC · JPL
799405	2013 MH_{14}	—	June 18, 2013	Haleakala	Pan-STARRS 1	JUN	840 m	MPC · JPL
799406	2013 MN_{14}	—	June 20, 2013	Mount Lemmon	Mount Lemmon Survey	·	1.4 km	MPC · JPL
799407	2013 MZ_{14}	—	June 19, 2013	Haleakala	Pan-STARRS 1	·	870 m	MPC · JPL
799408	2013 MR_{15}	—	June 19, 2013	Mount Lemmon	Mount Lemmon Survey	·	1 km	MPC · JPL
799409	2013 MG_{16}	—	October 4, 2014	Mount Lemmon	Mount Lemmon Survey	JUN	1.0 km	MPC · JPL
799410	2013 MB_{18}	—	June 18, 2013	Haleakala	Pan-STARRS 1	·	1.8 km	MPC · JPL
799411	2013 MH_{18}	—	June 19, 2013	Haleakala	Pan-STARRS 1	·	1.1 km	MPC · JPL
799412	2013 MT_{20}	—	June 18, 2013	Haleakala	Pan-STARRS 1	·	940 m	MPC · JPL
799413	2013 MD_{21}	—	June 18, 2013	Haleakala	Pan-STARRS 1	(5)	1.1 km	MPC · JPL
799414	2013 MY_{21}	—	June 20, 2013	Haleakala	Pan-STARRS 1	EUN	950 m	MPC · JPL
799415	2013 MN_{23}	—	June 18, 2013	Haleakala	Pan-STARRS 1	·	1.9 km	MPC · JPL
799416	2013 ME_{26}	—	June 18, 2013	Haleakala	Pan-STARRS 1	·	1.5 km	MPC · JPL
799417	2013 NM_{2}	—	July 1, 2013	Haleakala	Pan-STARRS 1	BRG	1.1 km	MPC · JPL
799418	2013 NZ_{2}	—	July 1, 2013	Haleakala	Pan-STARRS 1	DOR	1.7 km	MPC · JPL
799419	2013 NE_{5}	—	July 1, 2013	Haleakala	Pan-STARRS 1	·	1.2 km	MPC · JPL
799420	2013 NY_{13}	—	July 1, 2013	Haleakala	Pan-STARRS 1	·	1.6 km	MPC · JPL
799421	2013 NG_{27}	—	July 14, 2013	Haleakala	Pan-STARRS 1	·	1.1 km	MPC · JPL
799422	2013 NK_{27}	—	July 15, 2013	Haleakala	Pan-STARRS 1	·	1.2 km	MPC · JPL
799423	2013 ND_{28}	—	July 15, 2013	Haleakala	Pan-STARRS 1	·	850 m	MPC · JPL
799424	2013 NN_{28}	—	July 1, 2013	Haleakala	Pan-STARRS 1	·	1.1 km	MPC · JPL
799425	2013 NO_{28}	—	July 1, 2013	Haleakala	Pan-STARRS 1	(5)	960 m	MPC · JPL
799426	2013 NA_{29}	—	July 2, 2013	Haleakala	Pan-STARRS 1	T_{j} (2.96)	2.7 km	MPC · JPL
799427	2013 NL_{29}	—	July 14, 2013	Haleakala	Pan-STARRS 1	·	1.3 km	MPC · JPL
799428	2013 NK_{30}	—	July 14, 2013	Haleakala	Pan-STARRS 1	·	1.1 km	MPC · JPL
799429	2013 NY_{34}	—	July 14, 2013	Haleakala	Pan-STARRS 1	·	540 m	MPC · JPL
799430	2013 NQ_{35}	—	October 17, 2014	Mount Lemmon	Mount Lemmon Survey	·	2.4 km	MPC · JPL
799431	2013 NF_{37}	—	July 8, 2013	Haleakala	Pan-STARRS 1	·	990 m	MPC · JPL
799432	2013 NU_{38}	—	July 7, 2013	Siding Spring	SSS	·	1.2 km	MPC · JPL
799433	2013 NX_{47}	—	July 14, 2013	Haleakala	Pan-STARRS 1	·	1.2 km	MPC · JPL
799434	2013 NF_{49}	—	February 3, 2002	Cima Ekar	ADAS	H	340 m	MPC · JPL
799435	2013 NO_{49}	—	July 13, 2013	Haleakala	Pan-STARRS 1	·	930 m	MPC · JPL
799436	2013 NS_{50}	—	July 1, 2013	Haleakala	Pan-STARRS 1	·	660 m	MPC · JPL
799437	2013 NW_{52}	—	July 15, 2013	Haleakala	Pan-STARRS 1	EUN	780 m	MPC · JPL
799438	2013 NA_{58}	—	July 6, 2013	Haleakala	Pan-STARRS 1	·	1.1 km	MPC · JPL
799439	2013 NF_{58}	—	July 4, 2013	Haleakala	Pan-STARRS 1	·	1.2 km	MPC · JPL
799440	2013 NU_{58}	—	July 15, 2013	Haleakala	Pan-STARRS 1	EUN	700 m	MPC · JPL
799441	2013 NV_{58}	—	July 1, 2013	Haleakala	Pan-STARRS 1	·	920 m	MPC · JPL
799442	2013 NY_{58}	—	July 6, 2013	Haleakala	Pan-STARRS 1	·	1.1 km	MPC · JPL
799443	2013 NA_{59}	—	July 14, 2013	Haleakala	Pan-STARRS 1	·	1.1 km	MPC · JPL
799444	2013 NA_{60}	—	July 2, 2013	Haleakala	Pan-STARRS 1	·	840 m	MPC · JPL
799445	2013 NB_{60}	—	July 14, 2013	Haleakala	Pan-STARRS 1	·	1.0 km	MPC · JPL
799446	2013 NH_{60}	—	July 1, 2013	Haleakala	Pan-STARRS 1	·	1.0 km	MPC · JPL
799447	2013 NW_{61}	—	July 14, 2013	Haleakala	Pan-STARRS 1	·	1.4 km	MPC · JPL
799448	2013 NN_{62}	—	July 6, 2013	Haleakala	Pan-STARRS 1	·	1.0 km	MPC · JPL
799449	2013 NL_{63}	—	July 14, 2013	Haleakala	Pan-STARRS 1	·	1.2 km	MPC · JPL
799450	2013 NK_{66}	—	July 15, 2013	Haleakala	Pan-STARRS 1	·	940 m	MPC · JPL
799451	2013 NU_{66}	—	July 13, 2013	Haleakala	Pan-STARRS 1	·	1.3 km	MPC · JPL
799452	2013 NX_{66}	—	July 1, 2013	Haleakala	Pan-STARRS 1	·	1.9 km	MPC · JPL
799453	2013 NO_{68}	—	July 15, 2013	Haleakala	Pan-STARRS 1	·	1.0 km	MPC · JPL
799454	2013 NS_{68}	—	July 14, 2013	Haleakala	Pan-STARRS 1	EOS	1.4 km	MPC · JPL
799455	2013 NW_{68}	—	July 13, 2013	Haleakala	Pan-STARRS 1	KOR	890 m	MPC · JPL
799456	2013 NC_{71}	—	July 13, 2013	Haleakala	Pan-STARRS 1	ADE	1.5 km	MPC · JPL
799457	2013 NM_{71}	—	July 15, 2013	Haleakala	Pan-STARRS 1	·	990 m	MPC · JPL
799458	2013 NN_{72}	—	July 1, 2013	Haleakala	Pan-STARRS 1	(5)	810 m	MPC · JPL
799459	2013 NF_{73}	—	July 13, 2013	Haleakala	Pan-STARRS 1	·	960 m	MPC · JPL
799460	2013 NN_{76}	—	July 8, 2013	Haleakala	Pan-STARRS 1	·	1.2 km	MPC · JPL
799461	2013 NU_{77}	—	July 15, 2013	Haleakala	Pan-STARRS 1	·	1.4 km	MPC · JPL
799462	2013 NE_{78}	—	July 13, 2013	Haleakala	Pan-STARRS 1	EOS	1.3 km	MPC · JPL
799463	2013 NO_{80}	—	July 13, 2013	Haleakala	Pan-STARRS 1	·	1.8 km	MPC · JPL
799464	2013 OU_{4}	—	July 28, 2013	Haleakala	Pan-STARRS 1	BAR	940 m	MPC · JPL
799465	2013 OU_{5}	—	July 29, 2013	Westfield	International Astronomical Search Collaboration	·	1.4 km	MPC · JPL
799466	2013 OY_{7}	—	July 16, 2013	Haleakala	Pan-STARRS 1	·	910 m	MPC · JPL
799467	2013 OS_{12}	—	July 16, 2013	Haleakala	Pan-STARRS 1	·	1.7 km	MPC · JPL
799468	2013 OE_{15}	—	July 16, 2013	Haleakala	Pan-STARRS 1	·	1.3 km	MPC · JPL
799469	2013 OP_{16}	—	July 16, 2013	Haleakala	Pan-STARRS 1	·	2.1 km	MPC · JPL
799470	2013 OC_{18}	—	July 17, 2013	Haleakala	Pan-STARRS 1	·	1.3 km	MPC · JPL
799471	2013 OJ_{19}	—	July 16, 2013	Haleakala	Pan-STARRS 1	·	1.2 km	MPC · JPL
799472	2013 ON_{19}	—	July 16, 2013	Haleakala	Pan-STARRS 1	·	2.1 km	MPC · JPL
799473	2013 OQ_{19}	—	July 16, 2013	Haleakala	Pan-STARRS 1	·	1.6 km	MPC · JPL
799474	2013 PU_{2}	—	June 20, 2013	Haleakala	Pan-STARRS 1	H	430 m	MPC · JPL
799475	2013 PT_{3}	—	August 2, 2013	Haleakala	Pan-STARRS 1	·	1.2 km	MPC · JPL
799476	2013 PF_{12}	—	January 30, 2012	Mount Lemmon	Mount Lemmon Survey	H	310 m	MPC · JPL
799477	2013 PU_{17}	—	July 15, 2013	Haleakala	Pan-STARRS 1	EUN	790 m	MPC · JPL
799478	2013 PL_{18}	—	September 29, 2009	Mount Lemmon	Mount Lemmon Survey	·	1.2 km	MPC · JPL
799479	2013 PE_{20}	—	August 9, 2013	Kitt Peak	Spacewatch	EUN	900 m	MPC · JPL
799480	2013 PW_{20}	—	August 8, 2013	Črni Vrh	Vales, J.	·	870 m	MPC · JPL
799481	2013 PB_{22}	—	August 8, 2013	Kitt Peak	Spacewatch	·	700 m	MPC · JPL
799482	2013 PG_{22}	—	June 18, 2013	Mount Lemmon	Mount Lemmon Survey	EUN	1.0 km	MPC · JPL
799483	2013 PV_{22}	—	August 8, 2013	Haleakala	Pan-STARRS 1	·	2.3 km	MPC · JPL
799484	2013 PW_{22}	—	August 8, 2013	Haleakala	Pan-STARRS 1	·	1.6 km	MPC · JPL
799485	2013 PV_{29}	—	August 9, 2013	Haleakala	Pan-STARRS 1	·	2.0 km	MPC · JPL
799486	2013 PW_{29}	—	August 9, 2013	Haleakala	Pan-STARRS 1	VER	1.9 km	MPC · JPL
799487	2013 PB_{32}	—	October 23, 2009	Mount Lemmon	Mount Lemmon Survey	·	1.2 km	MPC · JPL
799488	2013 PF_{34}	—	August 8, 2013	Kitt Peak	Spacewatch	·	1.2 km	MPC · JPL
799489	2013 PS_{34}	—	August 9, 2013	Kitt Peak	Spacewatch	·	2.4 km	MPC · JPL
799490	2013 PB_{38}	—	September 18, 2009	Kitt Peak	Spacewatch	·	910 m	MPC · JPL
799491	2013 PS_{38}	—	August 10, 2013	Mount Lemmon	Mount Lemmon Survey	H	370 m	MPC · JPL
799492	2013 PR_{40}	—	August 12, 2013	Haleakala	Pan-STARRS 1	·	960 m	MPC · JPL
799493	2013 PR_{41}	—	August 12, 2013	Haleakala	Pan-STARRS 1	·	960 m	MPC · JPL
799494	2013 PA_{47}	—	August 9, 2013	Kitt Peak	Spacewatch	TEL	880 m	MPC · JPL
799495	2013 PC_{47}	—	August 9, 2013	Kitt Peak	Spacewatch	H	410 m	MPC · JPL
799496	2013 PM_{53}	—	August 14, 2013	Haleakala	Pan-STARRS 1	·	820 m	MPC · JPL
799497	2013 PX_{59}	—	February 12, 2000	Sacramento Peak	SDSS	·	750 m	MPC · JPL
799498	2013 PG_{72}	—	September 21, 2009	Catalina	CSS	·	1.4 km	MPC · JPL
799499	2013 PT_{76}	—	August 12, 2013	Haleakala	Pan-STARRS 1	·	1.2 km	MPC · JPL
799500	2013 PF_{78}	—	August 9, 2013	Haleakala	Pan-STARRS 1	·	1.1 km	MPC · JPL

== 799501–799600 ==
back to top

Designation			Discovery			Properties		Ref
Permanent	Provisional	Named after	Date	Site	Discoverer(s)	Category	Diam.	Ref
799501	2013 PX_{78}	—	August 13, 2013	Kitt Peak	Spacewatch	·	980 m	MPC · JPL
799502	2013 PN_{79}	—	August 9, 2013	Kitt Peak	Spacewatch	DOR	1.7 km	MPC · JPL
799503	2013 PU_{79}	—	September 29, 2009	Mount Lemmon	Mount Lemmon Survey	·	1.1 km	MPC · JPL
799504	2013 PC_{85}	—	August 8, 2013	Haleakala	Pan-STARRS 1	·	2.2 km	MPC · JPL
799505	2013 PM_{85}	—	August 4, 2013	Haleakala	Pan-STARRS 1	VER	2.1 km	MPC · JPL
799506	2013 PF_{86}	—	August 14, 2013	Haleakala	Pan-STARRS 1	·	610 m	MPC · JPL
799507	2013 PZ_{92}	—	August 15, 2013	Haleakala	Pan-STARRS 1	·	1.0 km	MPC · JPL
799508	2013 PZ_{98}	—	August 15, 2013	Haleakala	Pan-STARRS 1	·	1.2 km	MPC · JPL
799509	2013 PJ_{100}	—	August 9, 2013	Kitt Peak	Spacewatch	·	1.3 km	MPC · JPL
799510	2013 PF_{101}	—	August 15, 2013	Haleakala	Pan-STARRS 1	·	2.0 km	MPC · JPL
799511	2013 PN_{101}	—	August 4, 2013	Haleakala	Pan-STARRS 1	·	1.5 km	MPC · JPL
799512	2013 PA_{103}	—	August 9, 2013	Kitt Peak	Spacewatch	·	1.4 km	MPC · JPL
799513	2013 PZ_{103}	—	August 12, 2013	Haleakala	Pan-STARRS 1	·	1.1 km	MPC · JPL
799514	2013 PM_{105}	—	August 9, 2013	Haleakala	Pan-STARRS 1	·	1.5 km	MPC · JPL
799515	2013 PR_{105}	—	August 13, 2013	Kitt Peak	Spacewatch	·	630 m	MPC · JPL
799516	2013 PY_{105}	—	August 12, 2013	Haleakala	Pan-STARRS 1	NAE	1.5 km	MPC · JPL
799517	2013 PX_{106}	—	August 12, 2013	Haleakala	Pan-STARRS 1	·	1.2 km	MPC · JPL
799518	2013 PF_{111}	—	August 12, 2013	Haleakala	Pan-STARRS 1	·	2.0 km	MPC · JPL
799519	2013 PK_{114}	—	August 13, 2013	Kitt Peak	Spacewatch	·	1.2 km	MPC · JPL
799520	2013 PK_{115}	—	August 15, 2013	Haleakala	Pan-STARRS 1	·	980 m	MPC · JPL
799521	2013 PM_{115}	—	August 12, 2013	Haleakala	Pan-STARRS 1	·	1.5 km	MPC · JPL
799522	2013 PS_{115}	—	August 12, 2013	Haleakala	Pan-STARRS 1	·	860 m	MPC · JPL
799523	2013 PH_{116}	—	August 15, 2013	Haleakala	Pan-STARRS 1	·	1.1 km	MPC · JPL
799524	2013 PJ_{116}	—	August 4, 2013	Haleakala	Pan-STARRS 1	·	1.2 km	MPC · JPL
799525	2013 PY_{116}	—	August 15, 2013	Haleakala	Pan-STARRS 1	·	930 m	MPC · JPL
799526	2013 PR_{117}	—	August 15, 2013	Haleakala	Pan-STARRS 1	·	1.1 km	MPC · JPL
799527	2013 PU_{117}	—	August 14, 2013	Haleakala	Pan-STARRS 1	·	1.1 km	MPC · JPL
799528	2013 PA_{118}	—	August 11, 2013	Mauna Kea	D. J. Tholen, M. Micheli	AGN	910 m	MPC · JPL
799529	2013 PV_{118}	—	August 1, 2013	Haleakala	Pan-STARRS 1	·	1.4 km	MPC · JPL
799530	2013 PW_{118}	—	August 9, 2013	Haleakala	Pan-STARRS 1	EOS	1.3 km	MPC · JPL
799531	2013 PW_{119}	—	August 12, 2013	Haleakala	Pan-STARRS 1	·	620 m	MPC · JPL
799532	2013 PD_{122}	—	August 15, 2013	Haleakala	Pan-STARRS 1	WIT	590 m	MPC · JPL
799533	2013 PL_{123}	—	August 4, 2013	Haleakala	Pan-STARRS 1	·	1.0 km	MPC · JPL
799534	2013 PU_{123}	—	August 14, 2013	Haleakala	Pan-STARRS 1	·	1.1 km	MPC · JPL
799535	2013 PE_{125}	—	August 15, 2013	Haleakala	Pan-STARRS 1	EUN	780 m	MPC · JPL
799536	2013 PK_{126}	—	August 12, 2013	Haleakala	Pan-STARRS 1	·	1.1 km	MPC · JPL
799537	2013 PP_{129}	—	August 15, 2013	Haleakala	Pan-STARRS 1	·	1.1 km	MPC · JPL
799538	2013 PA_{130}	—	August 9, 2013	Kitt Peak	Spacewatch	·	1.4 km	MPC · JPL
799539	2013 PM_{130}	—	August 12, 2013	Haleakala	Pan-STARRS 1	·	1.0 km	MPC · JPL
799540	2013 PO_{131}	—	August 4, 2013	Haleakala	Pan-STARRS 1	·	990 m	MPC · JPL
799541	2013 PN_{132}	—	August 14, 2013	Haleakala	Pan-STARRS 1	·	1.1 km	MPC · JPL
799542	2013 PP_{132}	—	August 14, 2013	Haleakala	Pan-STARRS 1	·	1.0 km	MPC · JPL
799543	2013 PT_{132}	—	August 9, 2013	Kitt Peak	Spacewatch	·	1.1 km	MPC · JPL
799544	2013 PF_{135}	—	August 12, 2013	Haleakala	Pan-STARRS 1	·	1.9 km	MPC · JPL
799545	2013 PC_{138}	—	August 9, 2013	Haleakala	Pan-STARRS 1	KOR	1 km	MPC · JPL
799546	2013 PS_{138}	—	August 15, 2013	Haleakala	Pan-STARRS 1	(16286)	1.3 km	MPC · JPL
799547	2013 PW_{138}	—	August 4, 2013	Haleakala	Pan-STARRS 1	·	1.1 km	MPC · JPL
799548	2013 PL_{139}	—	October 10, 2005	Kitt Peak	Spacewatch	·	690 m	MPC · JPL
799549	2013 PT_{139}	—	October 8, 2008	Mount Lemmon	Mount Lemmon Survey	·	2.0 km	MPC · JPL
799550	2013 PY_{146}	—	August 12, 2013	Haleakala	Pan-STARRS 1	·	1.4 km	MPC · JPL
799551	2013 QC	—	February 27, 2012	Haleakala	Pan-STARRS 1	EUN	1.1 km	MPC · JPL
799552	2013 QQ_{5}	—	August 11, 2004	Campo Imperatore	CINEOS	·	1.5 km	MPC · JPL
799553	2013 QG_{6}	—	August 4, 2013	Haleakala	Pan-STARRS 1	H	450 m	MPC · JPL
799554	2013 QW_{6}	—	April 27, 2012	Haleakala	Pan-STARRS 1	·	1.2 km	MPC · JPL
799555	2013 QH_{8}	—	August 26, 2013	Haleakala	Pan-STARRS 1	·	1.7 km	MPC · JPL
799556	2013 QQ_{8}	—	September 28, 2009	Mount Lemmon	Mount Lemmon Survey	·	1.2 km	MPC · JPL
799557	2013 QT_{11}	—	August 24, 2013	Haleakala	Pan-STARRS 1	·	1.2 km	MPC · JPL
799558	2013 QV_{15}	—	August 29, 2013	Cerro Tololo-LCO A	Lister, T.	·	2.4 km	MPC · JPL
799559	2013 QF_{18}	—	August 26, 2013	Haleakala	Pan-STARRS 1	·	1.2 km	MPC · JPL
799560	2013 QU_{19}	—	August 26, 2013	Haleakala	Pan-STARRS 1	·	1.4 km	MPC · JPL
799561	2013 QF_{24}	—	August 26, 2013	Haleakala	Pan-STARRS 1	·	1.3 km	MPC · JPL
799562	2013 QO_{30}	—	July 14, 2013	Haleakala	Pan-STARRS 1	·	1.5 km	MPC · JPL
799563	2013 QG_{31}	—	August 29, 2013	Haleakala	Pan-STARRS 1	EUN	980 m	MPC · JPL
799564	2013 QK_{36}	—	August 26, 2013	Haleakala	Pan-STARRS 1	·	2.1 km	MPC · JPL
799565	2013 QR_{37}	—	August 27, 2013	Haleakala	Pan-STARRS 1	PHO	710 m	MPC · JPL
799566	2013 QV_{37}	—	August 12, 2013	Haleakala	Pan-STARRS 1	·	1.1 km	MPC · JPL
799567	2013 QJ_{47}	—	February 8, 2011	Mount Lemmon	Mount Lemmon Survey	KOR	920 m	MPC · JPL
799568	2013 QL_{48}	—	August 30, 2013	Haleakala	Pan-STARRS 1	H	390 m	MPC · JPL
799569	2013 QU_{49}	—	February 13, 2011	Mount Lemmon	Mount Lemmon Survey	·	1.0 km	MPC · JPL
799570	2013 QT_{52}	—	August 17, 2013	Haleakala	Pan-STARRS 1	·	1.6 km	MPC · JPL
799571	2013 QS_{56}	—	August 26, 2013	Haleakala	Pan-STARRS 1	·	1.6 km	MPC · JPL
799572	2013 QD_{60}	—	August 26, 2013	Haleakala	Pan-STARRS 1	·	770 m	MPC · JPL
799573	2013 QM_{60}	—	October 26, 2009	Mount Lemmon	Mount Lemmon Survey	·	1.3 km	MPC · JPL
799574	2013 QW_{69}	—	August 29, 2013	Haleakala	Pan-STARRS 1	TIN	840 m	MPC · JPL
799575	2013 QC_{74}	—	August 26, 2013	Haleakala	Pan-STARRS 1	·	970 m	MPC · JPL
799576	2013 QH_{74}	—	February 1, 2012	Mount Lemmon	Mount Lemmon Survey	·	1.3 km	MPC · JPL
799577	2013 QD_{77}	—	August 28, 2013	Mount Lemmon	Mount Lemmon Survey	·	950 m	MPC · JPL
799578	2013 QH_{81}	—	August 5, 2013	Palomar Mountain	Palomar Transient Factory	·	600 m	MPC · JPL
799579	2013 QT_{84}	—	August 29, 2013	Haleakala	Pan-STARRS 1	·	1.1 km	MPC · JPL
799580	2013 QO_{88}	—	January 27, 2011	Mount Lemmon	Mount Lemmon Survey	·	1.1 km	MPC · JPL
799581	2013 QV_{88}	—	August 12, 2013	Kitt Peak	Spacewatch	·	1.1 km	MPC · JPL
799582	2013 QY_{90}	—	August 28, 2013	Mount Lemmon	Mount Lemmon Survey	·	1.3 km	MPC · JPL
799583	2013 QD_{91}	—	August 24, 2003	Cerro Tololo	Deep Ecliptic Survey	KOR	1.1 km	MPC · JPL
799584	2013 QE_{94}	—	August 15, 2013	Haleakala	Pan-STARRS 1	3:2	3.6 km	MPC · JPL
799585	2013 QA_{95}	—	April 27, 2012	Haleakala	Pan-STARRS 1	THM	1.5 km	MPC · JPL
799586	2013 QY_{95}	—	August 17, 2013	Haleakala	Pan-STARRS 1	MAR	700 m	MPC · JPL
799587	2013 QC_{96}	—	August 27, 2013	Haleakala	Pan-STARRS 1	EUN	1.2 km	MPC · JPL
799588	2013 QZ_{98}	—	August 17, 2013	Haleakala	Pan-STARRS 1	·	1.5 km	MPC · JPL
799589	2013 QU_{99}	—	August 16, 2013	Haleakala	Pan-STARRS 1	·	1.1 km	MPC · JPL
799590	2013 QW_{100}	—	August 31, 2013	Haleakala	Pan-STARRS 1	·	1.4 km	MPC · JPL
799591	2013 QS_{101}	—	August 17, 2013	Piszkés-tető	K. Sárneczky, T. Csörgei	TIR	2.0 km	MPC · JPL
799592	2013 QZ_{102}	—	August 26, 2013	Haleakala	Pan-STARRS 1	·	1.7 km	MPC · JPL
799593	2013 QW_{103}	—	August 3, 2002	Palomar Mountain	NEAT	·	2.0 km	MPC · JPL
799594	2013 QW_{104}	—	August 31, 2013	Haleakala	Pan-STARRS 1	·	1.1 km	MPC · JPL
799595	2013 QE_{105}	—	August 28, 2013	Mount Lemmon	Mount Lemmon Survey	·	1.1 km	MPC · JPL
799596	2013 QX_{106}	—	August 31, 2013	Haleakala	Pan-STARRS 1	·	1.6 km	MPC · JPL
799597	2013 RY_{1}	—	September 1, 2013	Mayhill-ISON	L. Elenin	BAR	890 m	MPC · JPL
799598	2013 RR_{3}	—	September 1, 2013	Mount Lemmon	Mount Lemmon Survey	·	1.1 km	MPC · JPL
799599	2013 RC_{4}	—	February 28, 2012	Haleakala	Pan-STARRS 1	·	1.3 km	MPC · JPL
799600	2013 RH_{7}	—	August 15, 2013	Haleakala	Pan-STARRS 1	·	1.1 km	MPC · JPL

== 799601–799700 ==
back to top

Designation			Discovery			Properties		Ref
Permanent	Provisional	Named after	Date	Site	Discoverer(s)	Category	Diam.	Ref
799601	2013 RO_{8}	—	January 8, 2011	Mount Lemmon	Mount Lemmon Survey	·	470 m	MPC · JPL
799602	2013 RB_{10}	—	March 17, 2012	Mount Lemmon	Mount Lemmon Survey	BAR	690 m	MPC · JPL
799603	2013 RR_{19}	—	September 3, 2013	Catalina	CSS	PHO	720 m	MPC · JPL
799604	2013 RT_{22}	—	September 2, 2013	Mount Lemmon	Mount Lemmon Survey	·	850 m	MPC · JPL
799605	2013 RM_{27}	—	September 4, 2013	Mount Lemmon	Mount Lemmon Survey	EUN	1.0 km	MPC · JPL
799606	2013 RR_{30}	—	September 2, 2013	Mount Lemmon	Mount Lemmon Survey	·	2.1 km	MPC · JPL
799607	2013 RN_{47}	—	September 10, 2013	Haleakala	Pan-STARRS 1	·	520 m	MPC · JPL
799608	2013 RC_{62}	—	September 3, 2013	Haleakala	Pan-STARRS 1	·	1.3 km	MPC · JPL
799609	2013 RT_{62}	—	August 15, 2013	Haleakala	Pan-STARRS 1	·	1.2 km	MPC · JPL
799610	2013 RG_{63}	—	August 7, 2013	Kitt Peak	Spacewatch	·	1.1 km	MPC · JPL
799611	2013 RO_{70}	—	September 6, 2013	Kitt Peak	Spacewatch	·	1.3 km	MPC · JPL
799612	2013 RE_{77}	—	September 12, 2013	Mount Lemmon	Mount Lemmon Survey	·	770 m	MPC · JPL
799613	2013 RQ_{78}	—	August 14, 2013	Haleakala	Pan-STARRS 1	WIT	660 m	MPC · JPL
799614	2013 RC_{80}	—	November 30, 2008	Siding Spring	SSS	T_{j} (2.99)	1.7 km	MPC · JPL
799615	2013 RC_{82}	—	August 28, 2013	Catalina	CSS	DOR	1.9 km	MPC · JPL
799616	2013 RY_{83}	—	April 27, 2012	Haleakala	Pan-STARRS 1	·	1.2 km	MPC · JPL
799617	2013 RF_{85}	—	September 13, 2013	Kitt Peak	Spacewatch	·	1.4 km	MPC · JPL
799618	2013 RJ_{86}	—	September 13, 2013	Kitt Peak	Spacewatch	AGN	820 m	MPC · JPL
799619	2013 RA_{91}	—	September 14, 2013	Kitt Peak	Spacewatch	·	1.4 km	MPC · JPL
799620	2013 RO_{94}	—	September 14, 2013	Haleakala	Pan-STARRS 1	·	1.5 km	MPC · JPL
799621	2013 RC_{99}	—	March 14, 2007	Kitt Peak	Spacewatch	H	420 m	MPC · JPL
799622	2013 RC_{100}	—	September 14, 2013	Haleakala	Pan-STARRS 1	·	1.5 km	MPC · JPL
799623	2013 RA_{101}	—	September 3, 2013	Mount Lemmon	Mount Lemmon Survey	·	1.6 km	MPC · JPL
799624	2013 RL_{101}	—	October 21, 2006	Mount Lemmon	Mount Lemmon Survey	·	760 m	MPC · JPL
799625	2013 RH_{103}	—	September 6, 2013	Kitt Peak	Spacewatch	AGN	950 m	MPC · JPL
799626	2013 RN_{103}	—	September 15, 2013	Haleakala	Pan-STARRS 1	·	1.3 km	MPC · JPL
799627	2013 RD_{106}	—	April 27, 2012	Haleakala	Pan-STARRS 1	·	1.5 km	MPC · JPL
799628	2013 RU_{107}	—	September 15, 2013	Haleakala	Pan-STARRS 1	·	1.5 km	MPC · JPL
799629	2013 RT_{110}	—	September 3, 2013	Calar Alto	F. Hormuth	·	1.1 km	MPC · JPL
799630	2013 RT_{112}	—	September 14, 2013	Mount Lemmon	Mount Lemmon Survey	·	2.4 km	MPC · JPL
799631	2013 RD_{114}	—	September 13, 2013	Mount Lemmon	Mount Lemmon Survey	·	910 m	MPC · JPL
799632	2013 RO_{116}	—	September 1, 2013	Mount Lemmon	Mount Lemmon Survey	·	1.1 km	MPC · JPL
799633	2013 RR_{117}	—	September 4, 2013	Mount Lemmon	Mount Lemmon Survey	PHO · critical	670 m	MPC · JPL
799634	2013 RX_{123}	—	September 10, 2013	Haleakala	Pan-STARRS 1	·	1.9 km	MPC · JPL
799635	2013 RG_{125}	—	April 16, 2016	Haleakala	Pan-STARRS 1	·	1.3 km	MPC · JPL
799636	2013 RY_{126}	—	November 17, 2014	Haleakala	Pan-STARRS 1	·	2.1 km	MPC · JPL
799637	2013 RC_{127}	—	September 14, 2013	Haleakala	Pan-STARRS 1	GEF	930 m	MPC · JPL
799638	2013 RT_{127}	—	September 14, 2013	Mount Lemmon	Mount Lemmon Survey	critical	1.3 km	MPC · JPL
799639	2013 RY_{128}	—	September 10, 2013	Haleakala	Pan-STARRS 1	·	2.1 km	MPC · JPL
799640	2013 RM_{131}	—	September 1, 2013	Haleakala	Pan-STARRS 1	THM	1.3 km	MPC · JPL
799641	2013 RC_{132}	—	September 6, 2013	Mount Lemmon	Mount Lemmon Survey	·	910 m	MPC · JPL
799642	2013 RE_{132}	—	September 15, 2013	Mount Lemmon	Mount Lemmon Survey	·	1.4 km	MPC · JPL
799643	2013 RC_{133}	—	September 1, 2013	Mount Lemmon	Mount Lemmon Survey	·	1.4 km	MPC · JPL
799644	2013 RJ_{133}	—	September 1, 2013	Haleakala	Pan-STARRS 1	·	1.4 km	MPC · JPL
799645	2013 RN_{133}	—	September 4, 2013	Mount Lemmon	Mount Lemmon Survey	AGN	910 m	MPC · JPL
799646	2013 RN_{141}	—	September 12, 2013	Mount Lemmon	Mount Lemmon Survey	·	1.6 km	MPC · JPL
799647	2013 RC_{143}	—	September 13, 2013	Mount Lemmon	Mount Lemmon Survey	MAS	480 m	MPC · JPL
799648	2013 RN_{143}	—	September 12, 2013	Catalina	CSS	·	630 m	MPC · JPL
799649	2013 RQ_{143}	—	September 2, 2013	Mount Lemmon	Mount Lemmon Survey	·	1.3 km	MPC · JPL
799650	2013 RU_{143}	—	September 6, 2013	Mount Lemmon	Mount Lemmon Survey	·	1.8 km	MPC · JPL
799651	2013 RP_{147}	—	September 13, 2013	Mount Lemmon	Mount Lemmon Survey	·	2.4 km	MPC · JPL
799652	2013 RV_{148}	—	September 10, 2013	Haleakala	Pan-STARRS 1	GEF	870 m	MPC · JPL
799653	2013 RX_{148}	—	September 4, 2013	Piszkéstető	K. Sárneczky	·	1.1 km	MPC · JPL
799654	2013 RZ_{148}	—	September 1, 2013	Haleakala	Pan-STARRS 1	·	1.6 km	MPC · JPL
799655	2013 RC_{149}	—	September 14, 2013	Haleakala	Pan-STARRS 1	·	1.3 km	MPC · JPL
799656	2013 RE_{149}	—	September 10, 2013	Haleakala	Pan-STARRS 1	L5	6.2 km	MPC · JPL
799657	2013 RM_{149}	—	September 9, 2013	Haleakala	Pan-STARRS 1	·	1.3 km	MPC · JPL
799658	2013 RM_{150}	—	September 6, 2013	Kitt Peak	Spacewatch	·	1.5 km	MPC · JPL
799659	2013 RO_{150}	—	September 1, 2013	Mount Lemmon	Mount Lemmon Survey	·	1.2 km	MPC · JPL
799660	2013 RP_{150}	—	September 1, 2013	Mount Lemmon	Mount Lemmon Survey	·	1.0 km	MPC · JPL
799661	2013 RJ_{151}	—	July 17, 2004	Cerro Tololo	Deep Ecliptic Survey	·	970 m	MPC · JPL
799662	2013 RZ_{152}	—	September 14, 2013	Kitt Peak	Spacewatch	HOF	1.7 km	MPC · JPL
799663	2013 RN_{153}	—	September 1, 2013	Haleakala	Pan-STARRS 1	·	1.2 km	MPC · JPL
799664	2013 RO_{153}	—	September 14, 2013	Haleakala	Pan-STARRS 1	·	1.3 km	MPC · JPL
799665	2013 RR_{153}	—	September 13, 2013	Mount Lemmon	Mount Lemmon Survey	KOR	900 m	MPC · JPL
799666	2013 RP_{155}	—	September 6, 2013	Kitt Peak	Spacewatch	·	890 m	MPC · JPL
799667	2013 RH_{165}	—	September 14, 2013	Haleakala	Pan-STARRS 1	·	2.4 km	MPC · JPL
799668	2013 RF_{169}	—	September 1, 2013	Haleakala	Pan-STARRS 1	·	1.5 km	MPC · JPL
799669	2013 RK_{169}	—	September 1, 2013	Haleakala	Pan-STARRS 1	PAD	1.2 km	MPC · JPL
799670	2013 RT_{169}	—	September 3, 2013	Mount Lemmon	Mount Lemmon Survey	·	1.4 km	MPC · JPL
799671	2013 RY_{169}	—	September 12, 2013	Mount Lemmon	Mount Lemmon Survey	AGN	780 m	MPC · JPL
799672	2013 RZ_{169}	—	September 14, 2013	Mount Lemmon	Mount Lemmon Survey	HOF	1.8 km	MPC · JPL
799673	2013 RD_{170}	—	September 14, 2013	Mount Lemmon	Mount Lemmon Survey	·	1.5 km	MPC · JPL
799674	2013 RF_{170}	—	September 2, 2013	Mount Lemmon	Mount Lemmon Survey	·	1.2 km	MPC · JPL
799675	2013 RO_{170}	—	September 14, 2013	Mount Lemmon	Mount Lemmon Survey	·	1.5 km	MPC · JPL
799676	2013 RW_{170}	—	September 1, 2013	Haleakala	Pan-STARRS 1	·	1.3 km	MPC · JPL
799677	2013 RP_{171}	—	September 14, 2013	Haleakala	Pan-STARRS 1	·	1.3 km	MPC · JPL
799678	2013 RJ_{172}	—	September 2, 2013	Mount Lemmon	Mount Lemmon Survey	·	1.7 km	MPC · JPL
799679	2013 RL_{172}	—	September 15, 2013	Haleakala	Pan-STARRS 1	WIT	740 m	MPC · JPL
799680	2013 RU_{172}	—	September 10, 2013	Haleakala	Pan-STARRS 1	·	1.0 km	MPC · JPL
799681	2013 RW_{172}	—	September 4, 2013	Mount Lemmon	Mount Lemmon Survey	·	1.2 km	MPC · JPL
799682	2013 RF_{173}	—	September 15, 2013	Mount Lemmon	Mount Lemmon Survey	·	1.3 km	MPC · JPL
799683	2013 RP_{173}	—	September 5, 2013	Kitt Peak	Spacewatch	·	1.1 km	MPC · JPL
799684	2013 RU_{173}	—	September 12, 2013	Mount Lemmon	Mount Lemmon Survey	ADE	1.4 km	MPC · JPL
799685	2013 RH_{177}	—	September 14, 2013	Haleakala	Pan-STARRS 1	·	2.0 km	MPC · JPL
799686	2013 RL_{178}	—	September 14, 2013	Haleakala	Pan-STARRS 1	·	1.4 km	MPC · JPL
799687	2013 RJ_{188}	—	September 14, 2013	Haleakala	Pan-STARRS 1	·	2.0 km	MPC · JPL
799688	2013 RA_{192}	—	September 1, 2013	Mount Lemmon	Mount Lemmon Survey	·	2.1 km	MPC · JPL
799689	2013 RM_{193}	—	September 2, 2013	Mount Lemmon	Mount Lemmon Survey	·	1.8 km	MPC · JPL
799690	2013 RU_{194}	—	September 14, 2013	Haleakala	Pan-STARRS 1	·	1.2 km	MPC · JPL
799691	2013 SB_{4}	—	January 22, 2015	Haleakala	Pan-STARRS 1	TIR	1.8 km	MPC · JPL
799692	2013 SJ_{7}	—	July 20, 2013	Haleakala	Pan-STARRS 1	·	1.7 km	MPC · JPL
799693	2013 SY_{8}	—	July 16, 2013	Haleakala	Pan-STARRS 1	JUN	740 m	MPC · JPL
799694	2013 SQ_{18}	—	September 24, 2013	Kitt Peak	Spacewatch	·	1.3 km	MPC · JPL
799695	2013 SR_{20}	—	September 3, 2013	Mount Lemmon	Mount Lemmon Survey	H	420 m	MPC · JPL
799696	2013 SG_{24}	—	February 2, 2008	Mount Lemmon	Mount Lemmon Survey	·	940 m	MPC · JPL
799697	2013 SP_{24}	—	September 23, 2013	Haleakala	Pan-STARRS 1	BAR	800 m	MPC · JPL
799698	2013 SZ_{24}	—	September 28, 2013	Mount Lemmon	Mount Lemmon Survey	H	400 m	MPC · JPL
799699	2013 SH_{25}	—	September 30, 2013	Catalina	CSS	·	1.4 km	MPC · JPL
799700	2013 SD_{32}	—	September 25, 2013	Mount Lemmon	Mount Lemmon Survey	·	1.3 km	MPC · JPL

== 799701–799800 ==
back to top

Designation			Discovery			Properties		Ref
Permanent	Provisional	Named after	Date	Site	Discoverer(s)	Category	Diam.	Ref
799701	2013 SG_{40}	—	September 14, 2013	Haleakala	Pan-STARRS 1	·	540 m	MPC · JPL
799702	2013 SS_{52}	—	September 28, 2013	Piszkéstető	K. Sárneczky	EUN	920 m	MPC · JPL
799703	2013 SH_{54}	—	September 29, 2013	Mount Lemmon	Mount Lemmon Survey	·	1.1 km	MPC · JPL
799704	2013 SA_{55}	—	August 27, 2013	Haleakala	Pan-STARRS 1	·	1.7 km	MPC · JPL
799705	2013 SS_{66}	—	September 24, 2013	Mount Lemmon	Mount Lemmon Survey	HNS	840 m	MPC · JPL
799706	2013 SE_{70}	—	September 9, 2013	Haleakala	Pan-STARRS 1	·	2.0 km	MPC · JPL
799707	2013 SK_{75}	—	September 25, 2013	Mount Lemmon	Mount Lemmon Survey	EUN	890 m	MPC · JPL
799708	2013 SS_{76}	—	August 28, 2006	Siding Spring	SSS	·	580 m	MPC · JPL
799709	2013 SD_{77}	—	March 24, 2009	Kitt Peak	Spacewatch	·	500 m	MPC · JPL
799710	2013 SH_{77}	—	September 28, 2013	Mount Lemmon	Mount Lemmon Survey	·	1.8 km	MPC · JPL
799711	2013 SA_{80}	—	August 28, 2006	Kitt Peak	Spacewatch	·	470 m	MPC · JPL
799712	2013 SM_{80}	—	September 15, 2013	Mount Lemmon	Mount Lemmon Survey	·	1.7 km	MPC · JPL
799713	2013 SP_{80}	—	September 15, 2013	Mount Lemmon	Mount Lemmon Survey	·	1.3 km	MPC · JPL
799714	2013 SH_{83}	—	September 14, 2013	Haleakala	Pan-STARRS 1	GAL	1.1 km	MPC · JPL
799715	2013 SU_{86}	—	October 22, 2003	Kitt Peak	Spacewatch	·	550 m	MPC · JPL
799716	2013 SU_{89}	—	September 10, 2013	Haleakala	Pan-STARRS 1	·	1.2 km	MPC · JPL
799717	2013 SX_{91}	—	April 5, 2003	Kitt Peak	Spacewatch	·	1.1 km	MPC · JPL
799718	2013 SW_{92}	—	October 1, 2005	Mount Lemmon	Mount Lemmon Survey	·	630 m	MPC · JPL
799719	2013 SL_{97}	—	September 10, 2013	Haleakala	Pan-STARRS 1	·	1.3 km	MPC · JPL
799720	2013 SM_{103}	—	July 22, 2017	Haleakala	Pan-STARRS 1	MAR	780 m	MPC · JPL
799721	2013 SF_{105}	—	September 24, 2013	Mount Lemmon	Mount Lemmon Survey	·	1.5 km	MPC · JPL
799722	2013 SA_{111}	—	September 25, 2013	Mount Lemmon	Mount Lemmon Survey	DOR	1.6 km	MPC · JPL
799723	2013 SP_{113}	—	September 26, 2013	Mount Lemmon	Mount Lemmon Survey	HNS	730 m	MPC · JPL
799724	2013 SB_{114}	—	September 24, 2013	Calar Alto	S. Hellmich, G. Hahn	·	1.2 km	MPC · JPL
799725	2013 TA	—	September 24, 2013	Mount Lemmon	Mount Lemmon Survey	H	400 m	MPC · JPL
799726	2013 TJ_{2}	—	December 20, 2009	Mount Lemmon	Mount Lemmon Survey	TIN	970 m	MPC · JPL
799727	2013 TK_{8}	—	September 11, 2004	Kitt Peak	Spacewatch	EUN	950 m	MPC · JPL
799728	2013 TY_{12}	—	September 5, 2013	Catalina	CSS	·	1.6 km	MPC · JPL
799729	2013 TC_{13}	—	September 5, 2013	Kitt Peak	Spacewatch	·	940 m	MPC · JPL
799730	2013 TH_{15}	—	September 30, 2013	Mount Lemmon	Mount Lemmon Survey	·	1.2 km	MPC · JPL
799731	2013 TU_{16}	—	October 1, 2013	Mount Lemmon	Mount Lemmon Survey	·	590 m	MPC · JPL
799732	2013 TC_{19}	—	September 24, 2000	Socorro	LINEAR	·	1.4 km	MPC · JPL
799733	2013 TD_{21}	—	October 1, 2013	Mount Lemmon	Mount Lemmon Survey	HOF	1.9 km	MPC · JPL
799734	2013 TB_{29}	—	March 24, 2012	Mount Lemmon	Mount Lemmon Survey	H	430 m	MPC · JPL
799735	2013 TC_{31}	—	October 1, 2013	Calar Alto-CASADO	Mottola, S., Proffe, G.	·	1.2 km	MPC · JPL
799736	2013 TJ_{34}	—	March 21, 2001	Kitt Peak	SKADS	·	800 m	MPC · JPL
799737	2013 TA_{36}	—	October 2, 2013	Mount Lemmon	Mount Lemmon Survey	·	1.6 km	MPC · JPL
799738	2013 TF_{37}	—	April 22, 2007	Kitt Peak	Spacewatch	·	1.3 km	MPC · JPL
799739	2013 TP_{37}	—	September 14, 2013	Haleakala	Pan-STARRS 1	·	2.0 km	MPC · JPL
799740	2013 TE_{38}	—	October 2, 2013	Mount Lemmon	Mount Lemmon Survey	·	1.1 km	MPC · JPL
799741	2013 TT_{54}	—	October 4, 2013	Mount Lemmon	Mount Lemmon Survey	·	1.1 km	MPC · JPL
799742	2013 TT_{62}	—	September 13, 2013	Mount Lemmon	Mount Lemmon Survey	EUN	970 m	MPC · JPL
799743	2013 TA_{69}	—	April 20, 2010	Kitt Peak	Spacewatch	H	250 m	MPC · JPL
799744	2013 TQ_{69}	—	September 10, 2013	Haleakala	Pan-STARRS 1	·	1.3 km	MPC · JPL
799745	2013 TW_{84}	—	September 2, 2013	Catalina	CSS	·	1.4 km	MPC · JPL
799746	2013 TP_{88}	—	September 29, 2008	Mount Lemmon	Mount Lemmon Survey	MRX	870 m	MPC · JPL
799747	2013 TJ_{95}	—	September 13, 2013	Mount Lemmon	Mount Lemmon Survey	·	1.3 km	MPC · JPL
799748	2013 TB_{101}	—	September 14, 2013	Kitt Peak	Spacewatch	·	1.5 km	MPC · JPL
799749	2013 TU_{103}	—	October 3, 2013	Kitt Peak	Spacewatch	·	430 m	MPC · JPL
799750	2013 TA_{109}	—	August 31, 2005	Palomar Mountain	NEAT	H	420 m	MPC · JPL
799751	2013 TF_{110}	—	September 14, 2013	Mount Lemmon	Mount Lemmon Survey	H	420 m	MPC · JPL
799752	2013 TG_{118}	—	October 4, 2013	Mount Lemmon	Mount Lemmon Survey	·	1.2 km	MPC · JPL
799753	2013 TA_{120}	—	October 4, 2013	Mount Lemmon	Mount Lemmon Survey	EOS	1.1 km	MPC · JPL
799754	2013 TY_{120}	—	October 4, 2013	Mount Lemmon	Mount Lemmon Survey	HOF	1.8 km	MPC · JPL
799755	2013 TL_{123}	—	September 3, 2013	Kitt Peak	Spacewatch	JUN	700 m	MPC · JPL
799756	2013 TW_{123}	—	October 5, 2013	Haleakala	Pan-STARRS 1	AGN	880 m	MPC · JPL
799757	2013 TV_{126}	—	September 13, 2013	Mount Lemmon	Mount Lemmon Survey	EUN	870 m	MPC · JPL
799758	2013 TK_{129}	—	October 3, 2013	Haleakala	Pan-STARRS 1	·	1.3 km	MPC · JPL
799759	2013 TS_{138}	—	October 12, 2013	Oukaïmeden	C. Rinner	PHO	2.4 km	MPC · JPL
799760	2013 TC_{140}	—	October 1, 2013	Mount Lemmon	Mount Lemmon Survey	·	1.3 km	MPC · JPL
799761	2013 TL_{140}	—	September 14, 2013	Kitt Peak	Spacewatch	·	1.5 km	MPC · JPL
799762	2013 TR_{143}	—	September 19, 2006	Catalina	CSS	·	820 m	MPC · JPL
799763	2013 TD_{144}	—	October 3, 2006	Mount Lemmon	Mount Lemmon Survey	·	630 m	MPC · JPL
799764	2013 TA_{147}	—	August 8, 2013	Haleakala	Pan-STARRS 1	·	630 m	MPC · JPL
799765	2013 TB_{148}	—	August 9, 2013	Haleakala	Pan-STARRS 1	·	2.2 km	MPC · JPL
799766	2013 TG_{149}	—	October 5, 2013	Kitt Peak	Research and Education Collaborative Occultation Network	·	2.1 km	MPC · JPL
799767	2013 TC_{151}	—	October 5, 2013	Haleakala	Pan-STARRS 1	·	1.5 km	MPC · JPL
799768	2013 TD_{151}	—	February 16, 2005	La Silla	A. Boattini, H. Scholl	THM	1.8 km	MPC · JPL
799769	2013 TN_{158}	—	July 31, 2009	Kitt Peak	Spacewatch	MAS	480 m	MPC · JPL
799770	2013 TR_{159}	—	March 15, 2012	Mayhill-ISON	L. Elenin	H	440 m	MPC · JPL
799771	2013 TV_{160}	—	October 3, 2013	Haleakala	Pan-STARRS 1	·	1.6 km	MPC · JPL
799772	2013 TW_{160}	—	October 3, 2013	Haleakala	Pan-STARRS 1	·	1.8 km	MPC · JPL
799773	2013 TJ_{161}	—	October 9, 2013	Mount Lemmon	Mount Lemmon Survey	GEF	960 m	MPC · JPL
799774	2013 TN_{162}	—	October 3, 2013	Mount Lemmon	Mount Lemmon Survey	·	1.4 km	MPC · JPL
799775	2013 TY_{163}	—	September 28, 2008	Catalina	CSS	·	1.6 km	MPC · JPL
799776	2013 TJ_{164}	—	December 17, 2009	Mount Lemmon	Mount Lemmon Survey	·	870 m	MPC · JPL
799777	2013 TV_{164}	—	October 15, 2013	Mount Lemmon	Mount Lemmon Survey	·	1.1 km	MPC · JPL
799778	2013 TX_{165}	—	October 2, 2013	Haleakala	Pan-STARRS 1	·	1.2 km	MPC · JPL
799779	2013 TC_{169}	—	October 5, 2013	Haleakala	Pan-STARRS 1	·	1.2 km	MPC · JPL
799780	2013 TP_{174}	—	October 7, 2013	Kitt Peak	Spacewatch	·	900 m	MPC · JPL
799781	2013 TX_{179}	—	October 3, 2013	Haleakala	Pan-STARRS 1	·	1.2 km	MPC · JPL
799782	2013 TC_{180}	—	November 8, 2013	Mount Lemmon	Mount Lemmon Survey	·	1.2 km	MPC · JPL
799783	2013 TM_{181}	—	October 5, 2013	Kitt Peak	Spacewatch	·	920 m	MPC · JPL
799784	2013 TM_{188}	—	October 13, 2013	Mount Lemmon	Mount Lemmon Survey	·	1.6 km	MPC · JPL
799785	2013 TE_{191}	—	October 3, 2013	Haleakala	Pan-STARRS 1	·	1.4 km	MPC · JPL
799786	2013 TS_{191}	—	October 3, 2013	Mount Lemmon	Mount Lemmon Survey	AGN	850 m	MPC · JPL
799787	2013 TV_{191}	—	October 3, 2013	Haleakala	Pan-STARRS 1	·	1.7 km	MPC · JPL
799788	2013 TD_{194}	—	October 3, 2013	Haleakala	Pan-STARRS 1	·	1.3 km	MPC · JPL
799789	2013 TA_{195}	—	October 3, 2013	Haleakala	Pan-STARRS 1	MRX	630 m	MPC · JPL
799790	2013 TM_{196}	—	October 5, 2013	Haleakala	Pan-STARRS 1	·	2.3 km	MPC · JPL
799791	2013 TD_{197}	—	October 11, 2013	Calar Alto-CASADO	Mottola, S., Hellmich, S.	·	1.7 km	MPC · JPL
799792	2013 TK_{197}	—	October 3, 2013	Haleakala	Pan-STARRS 1	·	1.3 km	MPC · JPL
799793	2013 TN_{200}	—	October 5, 2013	Mount Lemmon	Mount Lemmon Survey	GEF	790 m	MPC · JPL
799794	2013 TO_{200}	—	October 1, 2013	Kitt Peak	Spacewatch	·	1.7 km	MPC · JPL
799795	2013 TG_{205}	—	October 5, 2013	Mount Lemmon	Mount Lemmon Survey	·	2.4 km	MPC · JPL
799796	2013 TW_{205}	—	October 5, 2013	Mount Lemmon	Mount Lemmon Survey	·	1.2 km	MPC · JPL
799797	2013 TS_{206}	—	October 3, 2013	Haleakala	Pan-STARRS 1	·	1.6 km	MPC · JPL
799798	2013 TC_{207}	—	October 5, 2013	Haleakala	Pan-STARRS 1	·	770 m	MPC · JPL
799799	2013 TK_{210}	—	October 1, 2013	Mount Lemmon	Mount Lemmon Survey	ARM	2.4 km	MPC · JPL
799800	2013 TB_{212}	—	October 9, 2013	Mount Lemmon	Mount Lemmon Survey	·	1.2 km	MPC · JPL

== 799801–799900 ==
back to top

Designation			Discovery			Properties		Ref
Permanent	Provisional	Named after	Date	Site	Discoverer(s)	Category	Diam.	Ref
799801	2013 TF_{216}	—	October 2, 2013	Mount Lemmon	Mount Lemmon Survey	·	1.0 km	MPC · JPL
799802	2013 TH_{217}	—	October 3, 2013	Haleakala	Pan-STARRS 1	·	2.4 km	MPC · JPL
799803	2013 TN_{217}	—	October 1, 2013	Mount Lemmon	Mount Lemmon Survey	·	1.3 km	MPC · JPL
799804	2013 TZ_{217}	—	October 4, 2013	Mount Lemmon	Mount Lemmon Survey	·	2.6 km	MPC · JPL
799805	2013 TN_{218}	—	October 3, 2013	Haleakala	Pan-STARRS 1	HOF	1.6 km	MPC · JPL
799806	2013 TG_{219}	—	October 3, 2013	Mount Lemmon	Mount Lemmon Survey	·	970 m	MPC · JPL
799807	2013 TV_{219}	—	October 3, 2013	Haleakala	Pan-STARRS 1	·	820 m	MPC · JPL
799808	2013 TP_{220}	—	October 3, 2013	Haleakala	Pan-STARRS 1	·	1.3 km	MPC · JPL
799809	2013 TQ_{220}	—	October 2, 2013	Mount Lemmon	Mount Lemmon Survey	EOS	1.4 km	MPC · JPL
799810	2013 TY_{220}	—	October 15, 2013	Kitt Peak	Spacewatch	·	1.0 km	MPC · JPL
799811	2013 TD_{221}	—	October 5, 2013	Haleakala	Pan-STARRS 1	·	1.4 km	MPC · JPL
799812	2013 TS_{221}	—	October 3, 2013	Mount Lemmon	Mount Lemmon Survey	·	1.2 km	MPC · JPL
799813	2013 TA_{223}	—	October 2, 2013	Mount Lemmon	Mount Lemmon Survey	L5	5.4 km	MPC · JPL
799814	2013 TW_{223}	—	October 15, 2013	Mount Lemmon	Mount Lemmon Survey	·	1.7 km	MPC · JPL
799815	2013 TZ_{223}	—	October 2, 2013	Mount Lemmon	Mount Lemmon Survey	·	1.2 km	MPC · JPL
799816	2013 TA_{224}	—	October 3, 2013	Haleakala	Pan-STARRS 1	·	1.5 km	MPC · JPL
799817	2013 TQ_{224}	—	October 15, 2013	Mount Lemmon	Mount Lemmon Survey	·	970 m	MPC · JPL
799818	2013 TH_{225}	—	October 5, 2013	Mount Lemmon	Mount Lemmon Survey	·	2.1 km	MPC · JPL
799819	2013 TR_{225}	—	October 5, 2013	Haleakala	Pan-STARRS 1	·	2.8 km	MPC · JPL
799820	2013 TA_{226}	—	October 5, 2013	Kitt Peak	Spacewatch	·	1.9 km	MPC · JPL
799821	2013 TJ_{235}	—	October 8, 2013	Mount Lemmon	Mount Lemmon Survey	H	350 m	MPC · JPL
799822	2013 TB_{236}	—	October 5, 2013	Haleakala	Pan-STARRS 1	·	1.4 km	MPC · JPL
799823	2013 TH_{237}	—	October 2, 2013	Haleakala	Pan-STARRS 1	·	1.3 km	MPC · JPL
799824	2013 TJ_{241}	—	October 14, 2013	Mount Lemmon	Mount Lemmon Survey	·	1.4 km	MPC · JPL
799825	2013 TG_{242}	—	October 13, 2013	Mount Lemmon	Mount Lemmon Survey	·	1.5 km	MPC · JPL
799826	2013 TQ_{242}	—	October 3, 2013	Mount Lemmon	Mount Lemmon Survey	·	1.2 km	MPC · JPL
799827	2013 TL_{243}	—	December 10, 2018	Mount Lemmon	Mount Lemmon Survey	·	1.1 km	MPC · JPL
799828	2013 TU_{243}	—	October 5, 2013	Haleakala	Pan-STARRS 1	·	1.4 km	MPC · JPL
799829	2013 TZ_{243}	—	October 3, 2013	Mount Lemmon	Mount Lemmon Survey	AST	1.2 km	MPC · JPL
799830	2013 TA_{244}	—	October 5, 2013	Haleakala	Pan-STARRS 1	·	1.4 km	MPC · JPL
799831	2013 TE_{244}	—	April 25, 2003	Kitt Peak	Spacewatch	·	1.6 km	MPC · JPL
799832	2013 TL_{244}	—	October 13, 2013	Mount Lemmon	Mount Lemmon Survey	·	1.1 km	MPC · JPL
799833	2013 TX_{244}	—	February 25, 2011	Mount Lemmon	Mount Lemmon Survey	AGN	740 m	MPC · JPL
799834	2013 TY_{244}	—	October 13, 2013	Mount Lemmon	Mount Lemmon Survey	·	1.3 km	MPC · JPL
799835	2013 TZ_{244}	—	October 2, 2013	Haleakala	Pan-STARRS 1	·	1.4 km	MPC · JPL
799836	2013 TS_{245}	—	October 9, 2013	Mount Lemmon	Mount Lemmon Survey	·	1.2 km	MPC · JPL
799837	2013 TK_{247}	—	October 5, 2013	Haleakala	Pan-STARRS 1	·	1.8 km	MPC · JPL
799838	2013 TS_{249}	—	October 12, 2013	Mount Lemmon	Mount Lemmon Survey	EOS	1.2 km	MPC · JPL
799839	2013 TH_{251}	—	October 15, 2013	Mount Lemmon	Mount Lemmon Survey	·	1.2 km	MPC · JPL
799840	2013 TZ_{253}	—	October 3, 2013	Haleakala	Pan-STARRS 1	·	1.2 km	MPC · JPL
799841	2013 TO_{284}	—	October 5, 2013	Haleakala	Pan-STARRS 1	·	1.5 km	MPC · JPL
799842	2013 UW_{1}	—	November 22, 2009	Catalina	CSS	·	1.5 km	MPC · JPL
799843	2013 UA_{2}	—	October 21, 2013	Haleakala	Pan-STARRS 1	H	350 m	MPC · JPL
799844	2013 UR_{2}	—	November 18, 2008	Catalina	CSS	H	420 m	MPC · JPL
799845	2013 UA_{3}	—	March 10, 2011	Kitt Peak	Spacewatch	·	960 m	MPC · JPL
799846	2013 UU_{10}	—	October 31, 2013	Mount Lemmon	Mount Lemmon Survey	H	430 m	MPC · JPL
799847	2013 US_{12}	—	October 3, 2013	Haleakala	Pan-STARRS 1	·	510 m	MPC · JPL
799848	2013 UM_{13}	—	October 12, 2013	Catalina	CSS	·	1.7 km	MPC · JPL
799849	2013 UV_{14}	—	October 27, 2013	Palomar Mountain	Palomar Transient Factory	H	460 m	MPC · JPL
799850	2013 UM_{16}	—	October 28, 2013	Mount Lemmon	Mount Lemmon Survey	·	1.4 km	MPC · JPL
799851	2013 UW_{19}	—	October 24, 2013	Mount Lemmon	Mount Lemmon Survey	·	1.6 km	MPC · JPL
799852	2013 UF_{21}	—	October 26, 2013	Mount Lemmon	Mount Lemmon Survey	·	1.4 km	MPC · JPL
799853	2013 UJ_{21}	—	October 26, 2013	Mount Lemmon	Mount Lemmon Survey	·	1.5 km	MPC · JPL
799854	2013 UG_{25}	—	October 23, 2013	Kitt Peak	Spacewatch	GAL	1.2 km	MPC · JPL
799855	2013 UO_{25}	—	October 25, 2013	Kitt Peak	Spacewatch	·	1.2 km	MPC · JPL
799856	2013 UZ_{26}	—	October 26, 2013	Kitt Peak	Spacewatch	·	1.2 km	MPC · JPL
799857	2013 UU_{27}	—	October 30, 2013	Haleakala	Pan-STARRS 1	H	400 m	MPC · JPL
799858	2013 UK_{31}	—	October 25, 2013	Mount Lemmon	Mount Lemmon Survey	AGN	840 m	MPC · JPL
799859	2013 UN_{31}	—	October 23, 2013	Mount Lemmon	Mount Lemmon Survey	HOF	1.8 km	MPC · JPL
799860	2013 UV_{31}	—	October 28, 2013	Mount Lemmon	Mount Lemmon Survey	·	1.5 km	MPC · JPL
799861	2013 UU_{32}	—	October 24, 2013	Mount Lemmon	Mount Lemmon Survey	·	1.5 km	MPC · JPL
799862	2013 UH_{33}	—	October 26, 2013	Mount Lemmon	Mount Lemmon Survey	AGN	800 m	MPC · JPL
799863	2013 UV_{34}	—	October 28, 2013	Mount Lemmon	Mount Lemmon Survey	EOS	1.4 km	MPC · JPL
799864	2013 UK_{38}	—	October 26, 2013	Mount Lemmon	Mount Lemmon Survey	·	1.3 km	MPC · JPL
799865	2013 UU_{38}	—	October 24, 2013	Mount Lemmon	Mount Lemmon Survey	·	1.5 km	MPC · JPL
799866	2013 UL_{44}	—	October 30, 2013	Haleakala	Pan-STARRS 1	EOS	1.4 km	MPC · JPL
799867	2013 UM_{47}	—	October 25, 2013	Mount Lemmon	Mount Lemmon Survey	(5)	710 m	MPC · JPL
799868	2013 UN_{47}	—	October 28, 2013	Mount Lemmon	Mount Lemmon Survey	·	1.4 km	MPC · JPL
799869	2013 UR_{47}	—	October 28, 2013	Mount Lemmon	Mount Lemmon Survey	·	1.2 km	MPC · JPL
799870	2013 UX_{47}	—	October 31, 2013	Mount Lemmon	Mount Lemmon Survey	KOR	940 m	MPC · JPL
799871	2013 UT_{48}	—	October 24, 2013	Mount Lemmon	Mount Lemmon Survey	·	1.2 km	MPC · JPL
799872	2013 UK_{49}	—	October 23, 2013	Mount Lemmon	Mount Lemmon Survey	·	1.5 km	MPC · JPL
799873	2013 UM_{53}	—	October 23, 2013	Mount Lemmon	Mount Lemmon Survey	·	1.3 km	MPC · JPL
799874	2013 UW_{53}	—	October 24, 2013	Mount Lemmon	Mount Lemmon Survey	·	1.2 km	MPC · JPL
799875	2013 UA_{54}	—	October 25, 2013	Mount Lemmon	Mount Lemmon Survey	·	1.2 km	MPC · JPL
799876	2013 UU_{54}	—	October 23, 2013	Mount Lemmon	Mount Lemmon Survey	·	1.3 km	MPC · JPL
799877	2013 UN_{56}	—	October 23, 2013	Mount Lemmon	Mount Lemmon Survey	·	1.4 km	MPC · JPL
799878	2013 UD_{58}	—	October 30, 2013	Haleakala	Pan-STARRS 1	EOS	1.5 km	MPC · JPL
799879	2013 UT_{58}	—	October 31, 2013	Mount Lemmon	Mount Lemmon Survey	·	1.2 km	MPC · JPL
799880	2013 UT_{62}	—	October 26, 2013	Mount Lemmon	Mount Lemmon Survey	·	1.7 km	MPC · JPL
799881	2013 UH_{64}	—	October 31, 2013	Mount Lemmon	Mount Lemmon Survey	L5	6.2 km	MPC · JPL
799882	2013 VA_{2}	—	October 13, 2013	Kitt Peak	Spacewatch	·	640 m	MPC · JPL
799883	2013 VW_{7}	—	September 17, 2013	Mount Lemmon	Mount Lemmon Survey	·	1.7 km	MPC · JPL
799884	2013 VT_{10}	—	October 28, 2013	Haleakala	Pan-STARRS 1	PHO	760 m	MPC · JPL
799885	2013 VJ_{16}	—	July 27, 2009	Kitt Peak	Spacewatch	·	790 m	MPC · JPL
799886	2013 VR_{22}	—	October 2, 2006	Catalina	CSS	·	650 m	MPC · JPL
799887	2013 VF_{31}	—	November 9, 2013	Mount Lemmon	Mount Lemmon Survey	·	510 m	MPC · JPL
799888	2013 VJ_{34}	—	November 1, 2013	Kitt Peak	Spacewatch	·	1.1 km	MPC · JPL
799889	2013 VO_{37}	—	November 9, 2013	Kitt Peak	Spacewatch	·	880 m	MPC · JPL
799890	2013 VB_{39}	—	November 9, 2013	Mount Lemmon	Mount Lemmon Survey	HOF	1.8 km	MPC · JPL
799891	2013 VS_{41}	—	November 12, 2013	Mount Lemmon	Mount Lemmon Survey	EUN	910 m	MPC · JPL
799892	2013 VD_{46}	—	November 2, 2013	Mount Lemmon	Mount Lemmon Survey	·	650 m	MPC · JPL
799893	2013 VX_{47}	—	November 9, 2013	Haleakala	Pan-STARRS 1	·	1.8 km	MPC · JPL
799894	2013 VP_{49}	—	November 8, 2013	Mount Lemmon	Mount Lemmon Survey	·	1.3 km	MPC · JPL
799895	2013 VN_{50}	—	November 9, 2013	Haleakala	Pan-STARRS 1	·	1.3 km	MPC · JPL
799896	2013 VO_{51}	—	November 4, 2013	Mount Lemmon	Mount Lemmon Survey	EOS	1.2 km	MPC · JPL
799897	2013 VR_{51}	—	November 10, 2013	Mount Lemmon	Mount Lemmon Survey	·	2.6 km	MPC · JPL
799898	2013 VU_{51}	—	November 4, 2013	Kitt Peak	Spacewatch	·	1.7 km	MPC · JPL
799899	2013 VE_{52}	—	November 1, 2013	Mount Lemmon	Mount Lemmon Survey	·	1.5 km	MPC · JPL
799900	2013 VE_{56}	—	November 8, 2013	Mount Lemmon	Mount Lemmon Survey	AST	1.4 km	MPC · JPL

== 799901–800000 ==
back to top

Designation			Discovery			Properties		Ref
Permanent	Provisional	Named after	Date	Site	Discoverer(s)	Category	Diam.	Ref
799901	2013 VF_{66}	—	November 9, 2013	Haleakala	Pan-STARRS 1	AGN	1.0 km	MPC · JPL
799902	2013 VC_{67}	—	November 9, 2013	Haleakala	Pan-STARRS 1	·	1.4 km	MPC · JPL
799903	2013 VO_{67}	—	November 4, 2013	Mount Lemmon	Mount Lemmon Survey	·	1.6 km	MPC · JPL
799904	2013 VD_{68}	—	November 7, 2013	Kitt Peak	Spacewatch	·	2.2 km	MPC · JPL
799905	2013 VQ_{68}	—	November 9, 2013	Haleakala	Pan-STARRS 1	·	1.4 km	MPC · JPL
799906	2013 VZ_{68}	—	November 9, 2013	Mount Lemmon	Mount Lemmon Survey	·	1.5 km	MPC · JPL
799907	2013 VD_{69}	—	November 11, 2013	Kitt Peak	Spacewatch	·	1.4 km	MPC · JPL
799908	2013 VJ_{70}	—	November 8, 2013	Mount Lemmon	Mount Lemmon Survey	·	1.2 km	MPC · JPL
799909	2013 VK_{71}	—	November 1, 2013	Mount Lemmon	Mount Lemmon Survey	·	2.1 km	MPC · JPL
799910	2013 VE_{74}	—	November 9, 2013	Mount Lemmon	Mount Lemmon Survey	·	1.5 km	MPC · JPL
799911	2013 VZ_{77}	—	November 4, 2013	Mount Lemmon	Mount Lemmon Survey	AGN	820 m	MPC · JPL
799912	2013 VX_{79}	—	November 10, 2013	Mount Lemmon	Mount Lemmon Survey	·	1.2 km	MPC · JPL
799913	2013 VZ_{79}	—	November 7, 2013	Mount Lemmon	Mount Lemmon Survey	·	1.6 km	MPC · JPL
799914	2013 VD_{80}	—	November 4, 2013	Mount Lemmon	Mount Lemmon Survey	·	1.2 km	MPC · JPL
799915	2013 VA_{81}	—	November 8, 2013	Kitt Peak	Spacewatch	·	1.5 km	MPC · JPL
799916	2013 VB_{81}	—	November 1, 2013	Mount Lemmon	Mount Lemmon Survey	·	1.2 km	MPC · JPL
799917	2013 VB_{82}	—	November 8, 2013	Mount Lemmon	Mount Lemmon Survey	·	1.3 km	MPC · JPL
799918	2013 VL_{82}	—	November 1, 2013	Mount Lemmon	Mount Lemmon Survey	·	1.4 km	MPC · JPL
799919	2013 VU_{88}	—	November 9, 2013	Haleakala	Pan-STARRS 1	·	1.2 km	MPC · JPL
799920	2013 VJ_{90}	—	November 4, 2013	Mount Lemmon	Mount Lemmon Survey	·	2.1 km	MPC · JPL
799921	2013 VW_{95}	—	November 1, 2013	Mount Lemmon	Mount Lemmon Survey	·	2.1 km	MPC · JPL
799922	2013 VJ_{96}	—	November 8, 2013	Kitt Peak	Spacewatch	·	1.8 km	MPC · JPL
799923	2013 WF_{10}	—	November 26, 2013	Mount Lemmon	Mount Lemmon Survey	·	1.4 km	MPC · JPL
799924	2013 WN_{10}	—	November 26, 2013	Nogales	M. Schwartz, P. R. Holvorcem	GAL	1.1 km	MPC · JPL
799925	2013 WX_{13}	—	November 27, 2013	Haleakala	Pan-STARRS 1	·	2.1 km	MPC · JPL
799926	2013 WM_{15}	—	November 27, 2013	Haleakala	Pan-STARRS 1	KOR	1.0 km	MPC · JPL
799927	2013 WV_{15}	—	November 27, 2013	Haleakala	Pan-STARRS 1	·	640 m	MPC · JPL
799928	2013 WS_{16}	—	September 28, 2003	Kitt Peak	Spacewatch	KOR	1.0 km	MPC · JPL
799929	2013 WU_{16}	—	November 27, 2013	Haleakala	Pan-STARRS 1	·	1.7 km	MPC · JPL
799930	2013 WF_{28}	—	November 26, 2013	Mount Lemmon	Mount Lemmon Survey	HOF	2.0 km	MPC · JPL
799931	2013 WZ_{35}	—	December 20, 2009	Kitt Peak	Spacewatch	·	1.1 km	MPC · JPL
799932	2013 WE_{36}	—	November 27, 2013	Haleakala	Pan-STARRS 1	·	800 m	MPC · JPL
799933	2013 WG_{41}	—	October 27, 2008	Kitt Peak	Spacewatch	KOR	1.1 km	MPC · JPL
799934	2013 WP_{44}	—	November 28, 2013	Haleakala	Pan-STARRS 1	H	490 m	MPC · JPL
799935	2013 WT_{54}	—	November 25, 2013	XuYi	PMO NEO Survey Program	·	1.5 km	MPC · JPL
799936	2013 WJ_{55}	—	December 24, 2006	Kitt Peak	Spacewatch	·	880 m	MPC · JPL
799937	2013 WW_{67}	—	November 28, 2013	Haleakala	Pan-STARRS 1	·	690 m	MPC · JPL
799938	2013 WT_{81}	—	October 3, 2013	Mount Lemmon	Mount Lemmon Survey	·	780 m	MPC · JPL
799939	2013 WN_{91}	—	November 28, 2013	Mount Lemmon	Mount Lemmon Survey	·	1.5 km	MPC · JPL
799940	2013 WP_{93}	—	August 13, 2012	Haleakala	Pan-STARRS 1	·	1.6 km	MPC · JPL
799941	2013 WE_{100}	—	November 29, 2013	Mount Lemmon	Mount Lemmon Survey	AGN	680 m	MPC · JPL
799942	2013 WP_{101}	—	November 29, 2013	Mount Lemmon	Mount Lemmon Survey	·	1.3 km	MPC · JPL
799943	2013 WL_{112}	—	November 21, 2008	Kitt Peak	Spacewatch	·	1.6 km	MPC · JPL
799944	2013 WW_{112}	—	November 28, 2013	Kitt Peak	Spacewatch	EUN	840 m	MPC · JPL
799945	2013 WT_{114}	—	November 27, 2013	Haleakala	Pan-STARRS 1	·	1.3 km	MPC · JPL
799946	2013 WF_{123}	—	November 28, 2013	Mount Lemmon	Mount Lemmon Survey	H	520 m	MPC · JPL
799947	2013 WQ_{123}	—	November 28, 2013	Kitt Peak	Spacewatch	·	1.7 km	MPC · JPL
799948	2013 WP_{125}	—	November 26, 2013	Mount Lemmon	Mount Lemmon Survey	KOR	870 m	MPC · JPL
799949	2013 WC_{126}	—	November 28, 2013	Mount Lemmon	Mount Lemmon Survey	PHO	830 m	MPC · JPL
799950	2013 WZ_{126}	—	November 26, 2013	Mount Lemmon	Mount Lemmon Survey	THM	1.5 km	MPC · JPL
799951	2013 WP_{127}	—	November 28, 2013	Mount Lemmon	Mount Lemmon Survey	·	1.9 km	MPC · JPL
799952	2013 WE_{129}	—	November 24, 2013	Haleakala	Pan-STARRS 1	H	450 m	MPC · JPL
799953	2013 WS_{129}	—	November 27, 2013	Haleakala	Pan-STARRS 1	·	700 m	MPC · JPL
799954	2013 WX_{129}	—	November 28, 2013	Mount Lemmon	Mount Lemmon Survey	·	1.5 km	MPC · JPL
799955	2013 WZ_{132}	—	November 24, 2013	Haleakala	Pan-STARRS 1	3:2	3.7 km	MPC · JPL
799956	2013 WQ_{133}	—	November 29, 2013	Mount Lemmon	Mount Lemmon Survey	·	660 m	MPC · JPL
799957	2013 WS_{135}	—	November 26, 2013	Haleakala	Pan-STARRS 1	·	570 m	MPC · JPL
799958	2013 WZ_{135}	—	November 27, 2013	Haleakala	Pan-STARRS 1	EOS	1.3 km	MPC · JPL
799959	2013 WC_{142}	—	November 27, 2013	Haleakala	Pan-STARRS 1	·	1.2 km	MPC · JPL
799960	2013 WE_{142}	—	November 27, 2013	Haleakala	Pan-STARRS 1	·	1.8 km	MPC · JPL
799961	2013 WK_{142}	—	November 28, 2013	Mount Lemmon	Mount Lemmon Survey	·	870 m	MPC · JPL
799962	2013 WA_{143}	—	November 28, 2013	Mount Lemmon	Mount Lemmon Survey	·	1.6 km	MPC · JPL
799963	2013 WE_{143}	—	November 27, 2013	Haleakala	Pan-STARRS 1	BRA	1.1 km	MPC · JPL
799964	2013 WG_{143}	—	November 27, 2013	Haleakala	Pan-STARRS 1	AGN	1.0 km	MPC · JPL
799965	2013 WT_{144}	—	November 27, 2013	Haleakala	Pan-STARRS 1	·	810 m	MPC · JPL
799966	2013 WW_{144}	—	November 27, 2013	Haleakala	Pan-STARRS 1	KOR	830 m	MPC · JPL
799967	2013 WG_{147}	—	November 28, 2013	Mount Lemmon	Mount Lemmon Survey	·	1.2 km	MPC · JPL
799968	2013 XU_{5}	—	December 3, 2013	Haleakala	Pan-STARRS 1	·	2.0 km	MPC · JPL
799969	2013 XX_{9}	—	April 21, 2012	Mayhill-ISON	L. Elenin	H	640 m	MPC · JPL
799970	2013 XK_{10}	—	November 27, 2013	Kitt Peak	Spacewatch	H	390 m	MPC · JPL
799971	2013 XV_{13}	—	December 7, 2013	Mount Lemmon	Mount Lemmon Survey	TEL	1.0 km	MPC · JPL
799972	2013 XL_{22}	—	December 15, 2013	Haleakala	Pan-STARRS 1	·	1.0 km	MPC · JPL
799973	2013 XG_{26}	—	December 4, 2013	Haleakala	Pan-STARRS 1	H	400 m	MPC · JPL
799974	2013 XX_{32}	—	December 11, 2013	Haleakala	Pan-STARRS 1	·	1.5 km	MPC · JPL
799975	2013 XR_{34}	—	December 11, 2013	Haleakala	Pan-STARRS 1	·	1.2 km	MPC · JPL
799976	2013 XV_{35}	—	December 11, 2013	Haleakala	Pan-STARRS 1	·	1.1 km	MPC · JPL
799977	2013 XT_{37}	—	December 11, 2013	Haleakala	Pan-STARRS 1	·	2.1 km	MPC · JPL
799978	2013 XL_{41}	—	December 7, 2013	Mount Lemmon	Mount Lemmon Survey	·	1.2 km	MPC · JPL
799979	2013 XF_{44}	—	May 1, 2016	Cerro Tololo	DECam	·	1.1 km	MPC · JPL
799980	2013 YB_{6}	—	November 9, 2013	Mount Lemmon	Mount Lemmon Survey	·	2.0 km	MPC · JPL
799981	2013 YR_{10}	—	December 24, 2013	Mount Lemmon	Mount Lemmon Survey	H	440 m	MPC · JPL
799982	2013 YG_{18}	—	December 7, 2013	Mount Lemmon	Mount Lemmon Survey	·	2.9 km	MPC · JPL
799983	2013 YT_{22}	—	October 26, 2013	Mount Lemmon	Mount Lemmon Survey	·	1.5 km	MPC · JPL
799984	2013 YJ_{26}	—	December 13, 2013	Mount Lemmon	Mount Lemmon Survey	·	2.1 km	MPC · JPL
799985	2013 YF_{30}	—	December 11, 2013	Mount Lemmon	Mount Lemmon Survey	·	630 m	MPC · JPL
799986	2013 YV_{35}	—	November 9, 2013	Mount Lemmon	Mount Lemmon Survey	H	480 m	MPC · JPL
799987	2013 YA_{37}	—	December 27, 2013	Mount Lemmon	Mount Lemmon Survey	·	1.2 km	MPC · JPL
799988	2013 YJ_{38}	—	November 1, 2008	Mount Lemmon	Mount Lemmon Survey	H	450 m	MPC · JPL
799989	2013 YP_{41}	—	December 25, 2013	Mount Lemmon	Mount Lemmon Survey	H	500 m	MPC · JPL
799990	2013 YG_{50}	—	December 24, 2013	Mount Lemmon	Mount Lemmon Survey	·	700 m	MPC · JPL
799991	2013 YW_{50}	—	October 23, 2013	Haleakala	Pan-STARRS 1	·	1.6 km	MPC · JPL
799992	2013 YJ_{51}	—	November 1, 2013	Catalina	CSS	·	1.7 km	MPC · JPL
799993	2013 YC_{52}	—	December 11, 2013	Mount Lemmon	Mount Lemmon Survey	HNS	810 m	MPC · JPL
799994	2013 YB_{61}	—	December 27, 2013	Kitt Peak	Spacewatch	(5)	1.0 km	MPC · JPL
799995	2013 YS_{63}	—	December 27, 2013	Kitt Peak	Spacewatch	PHO	810 m	MPC · JPL
799996	2013 YA_{66}	—	December 3, 2013	Haleakala	Pan-STARRS 1	·	2.2 km	MPC · JPL
799997	2013 YA_{70}	—	December 30, 2013	Mount Lemmon	Mount Lemmon Survey	·	1.8 km	MPC · JPL
799998	2013 YO_{72}	—	December 10, 2013	Mount Lemmon	Mount Lemmon Survey	PHO	650 m	MPC · JPL
799999	2013 YD_{76}	—	December 26, 2013	Mount Lemmon	Mount Lemmon Survey	H	500 m	MPC · JPL
800000	2013 YN_{87}	—	October 2, 2008	Mount Lemmon	Mount Lemmon Survey	(5)	980 m	MPC · JPL

back to top
