= 10 Hygiea =

Fourth-largest asteroid

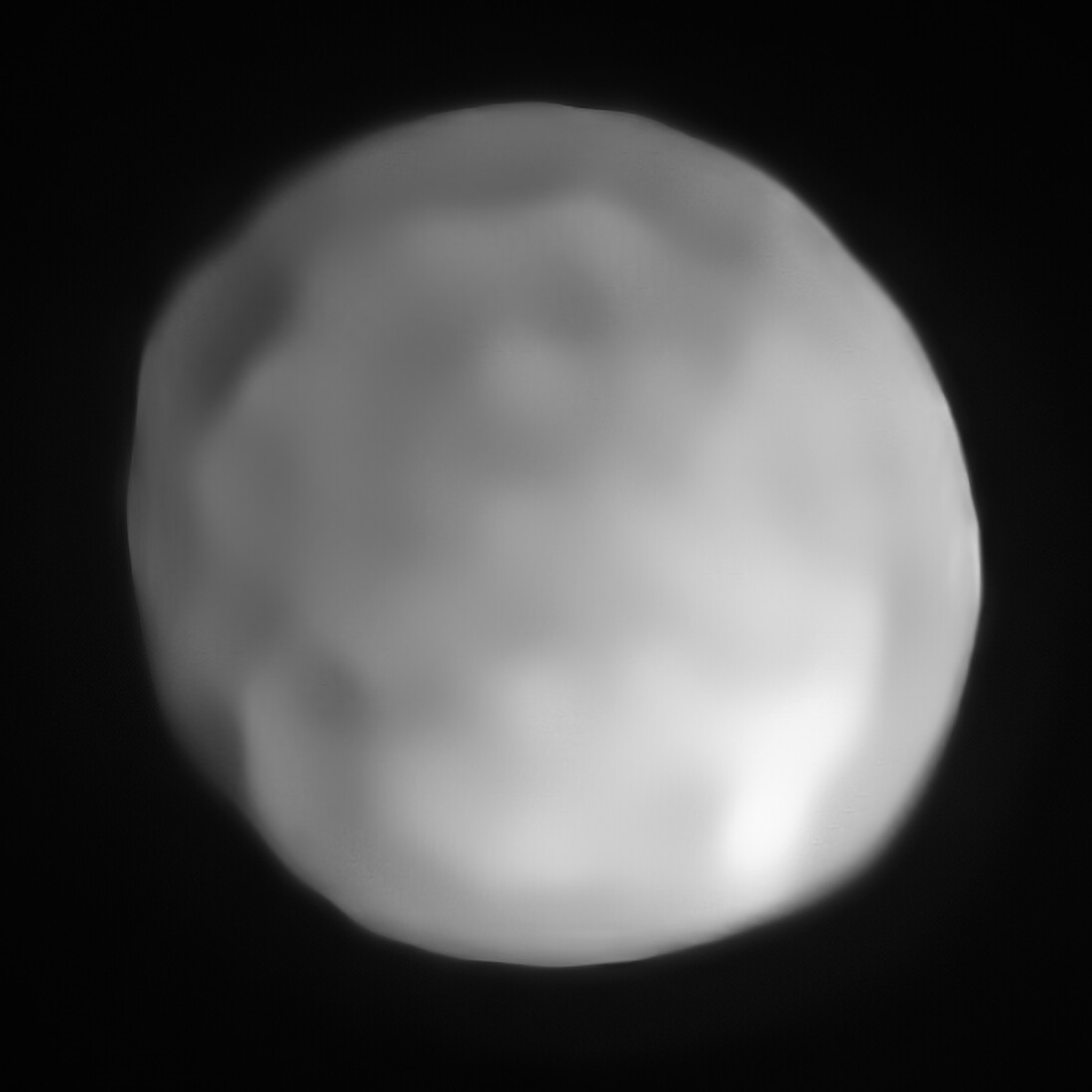
- Hygiea's southern hemisphere imaged by the Very Large Telescope in July 2017

Discovery
- Discovered by: Annibale de Gasparis
- Discovery site: Astronomical Observatory of Capodimonte
- Discovery date: 12 April 1849

Designations
- Pronunciation: /haɪˈdʒiːə/
- Named after: Hygieia
- Alternative designations: A849 GA · A900 GA
- Minor planet category: Main belt (outer) · Hygiea family
- Adjectives: Hygiean /haɪˈdʒiːən/
- Symbol: (historical astronomical) (modern astrological)

Orbital characteristics
- Epoch 9 June 2026 (JD 2461200.5)
- Uncertainty parameter 0
- Aphelion: 3.487 AU (522 million km)
- Perihelion: 2.815 AU (421 million km)
- Semi-major axis: 3.151 AU (471 million km)
- Eccentricity: 0.1067
- Orbital period (sidereal): 5.59 yr (2,043 days)
- Mean anomaly: 252.03°
- Mean motion: 0° 10^{m} 36.588^{s} / day
- Inclination: 3.895° to ecliptic
- Longitude of ascending node: 283.12°
- Time of perihelion: 15 February 2028
- Argument of perihelion: 312.42°

Proper orbital elements
- Proper semi-major axis: 3.1418 AU
- Proper eccentricity: 0.1356
- Proper inclination: 5.1039°
- Proper mean motion: 64.6218 deg / yr
- Proper orbital period: 5.57088 yr (2034.762 d)
- Precession of perihelion long.: 128.544 arcsec / yr
- Precession of asc. node: −96.9024 arcsec / yr

Physical characteristics
- Dimensions: 450 km × 430 km × 424 km (± 10 km × 10 km × 20 km)
- Mean diameter: 433±8 km (2021); 434±14 km (2020)
- Mass: (8.237±0.020)×10^{19} kg (Note: Calculated from its standard gravitational parameter GM = 5.497395131±0.013549087 km^{3}/s^{2}.)
- Mean density: 1.94±0.11 g/cm^{3} (Note: Assuming a diameter of 433 ± 8 km.)
- Equatorial surface gravity: 0.116 m/s^{2} (average)
- Equatorial escape velocity: 0.225 km/s (average)
- Sidereal rotation period: 13.82559±0.00005 h
- Axial tilt: 120° (to orbit)
- North pole right ascension: 319°±3°
- North pole declination: −46°±3°
- Pole ecliptic longitude: 306°±3°
- Pole ecliptic latitude: −29°±3°
- Geometric albedo: 0.063 (2021); 0.072 (2020)
| Surface temp. | min | mean | max |
|---|---|---|---|
| Kelvin | ≈100 | 163 | 230±5 |
- Spectral type: C
- Apparent magnitude: 9.0 to 12.0
- Absolute magnitude (H): 5.65
- Angular diameter: 0.1 to 0.3 arcseconds

10 Hygiea is a large asteroid in the outer region of the main asteroid belt, between the orbits of Mars and Jupiter. It was the tenth known asteroid, discovered on 12 April 1849 by Italian astronomer Annibale de Gasparis at the Astronomical Observatory of Capodimonte in Naples, Italy. It was named after Hygieia, the Greek goddess of health. It is the fourth-largest main-belt asteroid by both volume and mass, with a mean diameter of 433 km (269 mi) and a mass constituting 3% of the main asteroid belt's total mass.

Hygiea has a nearly spherical shape, with two known craters about 100 and 180 km (62 and 112 mi) in diameter. Because of its shape and large size, some researchers consider Hygiea a possible dwarf planet. Hygiea has a dark, carbonaceous surface consisting of hydrated and ammoniated silicate minerals, with carbonates and water ice. Hygiea's subsurface likely contains a large fraction of water ice. These characteristics make Hygiea very similar to the main-belt dwarf planet Ceres, which suggests the two objects have similar origins and evolutionary histories.

Hygiea is the parent body of the Hygiea family, an asteroid family comprising over 7,000 known asteroids that share similar orbital and compositional characteristics with Hygiea. The Hygiea family is believed to have formed by a giant impact on Hygiea about 2 to 3 billion years ago. This impact is thought to have shattered Hygiea, which led to its reaccumulation as a nearly spherical body.

== History ==
=== Discovery ===
Hygiea was discovered on the evening of 12 April 1849 by Italian astronomer Annibale de Gasparis at the Astronomical Observatory of Capodimonte in Naples, Italy. On that night he was using the observatory's Reichenbach equatorial telescope (Note: The Reichenbach equatorial telescope was the smaller of the Capodimonte Observatory's two equatorial telescopes, with an objective lens diameter of 8.3 cm (3.3 in) and focal length of 120 cm (47 in). The Reichenbach equatorial telescope was located in the northern dome of the observatory.) to observe a section of the sky in the 12th hour of right ascension, as part of his larger project of cataloguing stars along the ecliptic up to the 14th apparent magnitude. While comparing his observations to the Berlin Academy's star chart, (Note: The Berlin Academy star chart, which was published in years between 1830 and 1859, was compiled by a collaboration of astronomers who were each allotted a section of the sky spanning one hour of right ascension. The stars in the 12th (XXII) hour of right ascension were charted by Carl August von Steinheil, whose map aided de Gasparis's discovery of Hygiea.) de Gasparis noticed a starlike object between magnitude 9 and 10 which was not recorded before. (Note: Hygiea was located at the 12th hour of right ascension in the sky at the time of its discovery.) Although poor weather prevented further observations for a few days, de Gasparis reobserved the object on 14 and 17 April and confirmed it had moved between these dates.

Judging by how much the object had moved, de Gasparis concluded it must be another new planet (Note: Asteroids were referred to as "planets" at the time of Hygiea's discovery. These would eventually be recategorized as "minor planets".) between the orbit of Mars and Jupiter. De Gasparis announced his discovery to Erasmo Fabri Scarpellini, secretary of the Correspondenza Scientifica bulletin at Rome, Italy, who in turn passed on the news to Heinrich Christian Schumacher, who published it in the Astronomische Nachrichten journal on 11 May 1849. Hygiea was the first asteroid discovered by de Gasparis and the tenth asteroid discovered in history. He would later discover another six asteroids between 1850 and 1853 and two more during the 1860s.

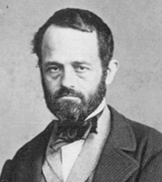
Annibale de Gasparis, discoverer of Hygiea

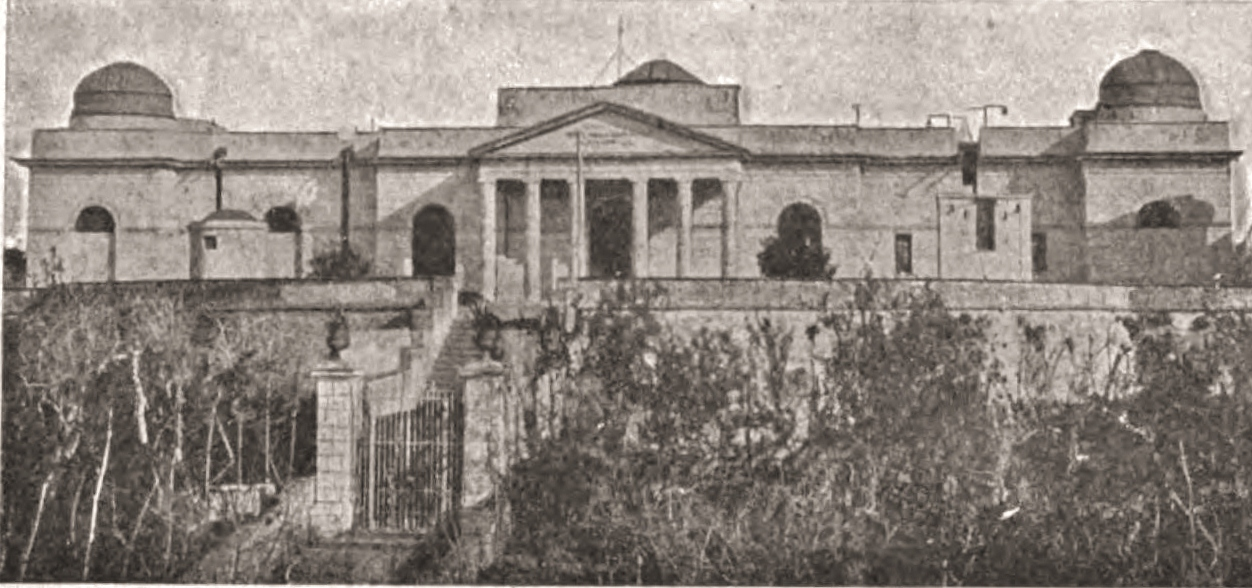
The Astronomical Observatory of Capodimonte, where Hygiea was discovered

=== Name ===
De Gasparis invited Ernesto Capocci Belmonte, his friend and director of the Capodimonte Observatory, to assign a name to the asteroid as gratitude for his help and advice. Capocci suggested the name Igea—the Italian spelling of Hygieia, the Greek goddess of health and daughter of Asclepius. De Gasparis added the adjective Borbonica to Capocci's suggested name, to honor King Ferdinand II of the Bourbons of Naples who ruled the Kingdom of the Two Sicilies and supported the work of the Capodimonte Observatory. Together, de Gasparis and Capocci proposed the name Igea Borbonica ("Bourbon Hygieia") in a letter forwarded to Ferdinand II on 8 May 1849. De Gasparis's commemoration of the Bourbons may have helped him and Capocci circumvent punishment for their participation in the liberal movements of 1848.

The name Igea Borbonica was not mentioned in the first communications to the European scientific community. When English astronomer John Herschel received the news of Hygiea's discovery from his Neapolitan colleagues, he suggested that Parthenope would be an apt name for de Gasparis's discovery, as it comes from the siren who founded Naples in Greek mythology. In a letter written to English mathematician Augustus De Morgan in April 1849, Herschel wrote:

No name has yet been mentioned. What do you think of Parthenope (being a Neapolitan?) I should think it will occur as a matter of course to Gasparis if he has any classical reading.

— John Herschel, in a letter to Augustus De Morgan (April 1849)

Herschel corresponded with other European scientists and astronomers to hear their thoughts on the name Parthenope for de Gasparis's discovery, although by the time he reached out to de Gasparis, Hygiea had already been named one month earlier. When Schumacher, editor of Astronomische Nachrichten, learned of the name proposed by de Gasparis and Capocci, he complained in a letter addressed to Herschel on 26 June 1849 that it had the Italian spelling instead of the Latin form, as conventionally done for all the other planets. Regardless, de Gasparis recognized Herschel's suggestion and expressed desire to realize Herschel's wish. On 11 May 1850, de Gasparis discovered the asteroid 11 Parthenope and acknowledged Herschel for the name in his announcement.

There are multiple variations on the Latin spelling of Hygiea, including Hygièa, Hygia, and Hygea. The modern English form Hygiea is a less common variant of the goddess's name, which in Greek is Ὑγίεια (Hygieia) or Ὑγεῖα (Hygeia). The name was often spelled Hygeia (and occasionally Hygea) by astronomers during the early 1850s, though by the 1860s, the spelling Hygiea became commonplace. According to the English astronomer John Russell Hind, the adjective Borbonica had been dropped by 1852.

=== Symbol and designation ===
As with the other previously discovered asteroids, Hygiea was given an astronomical symbol as a way of representing it. The symbol for Hygiea was proposed by de Gasparis in a letter addressed to Hind on 4 November 1850, in which he wrote, "The symbol of Hygeia [sic] is a serpent (like a Greek ζ) crowned with a star." Visually, de Gasparis's symbol for Hygiea is depicted as: (U+1F779 🝹 in Unicode 17.0). The serpent, particularly when drinking from a bowl, is a traditional symbol of the goddess Hygieia (cf. U+1F54F 🕏).

However, perhaps due to the late announcement of Hygiea's intended symbol, it was not used in following astronomical almanacs such as the Berliner Astronomisches Jahrbuch in 1850 and the Nautical Almanac and Astronomical Ephemeris in 1852, marking the first time an asteroid was listed without its symbol in these almanacs. American astronomer Benjamin Apthorp Gould interpreted Hygiea's symbol as a rod of Asclepius, depicting it as a serpent coiled around a staff in a January 1852 publication of the Astronomical Journal: (U+2695 ⚕).

Both symbols of Hygiea soon became obsolete, as the number of asteroids discovered had grown too much for each to have unique symbols. In 1851 Johann Franz Encke proposed a different identification system, suggesting using a number corresponding to the asteroid's order of discovery enclosed in a small circle. For Hygiea, it would be ⑩. Astronomers began adopting Encke's circled number scheme in scientific publications, though as the number of asteroids discovered grew, astronomers eventually switched to plainly writing out the asteroid's number, sometimes enclosing it in parentheses. This led to the modern minor-planet designation scheme, where Hygiea is referred to (10) Hygiea or 10 Hygiea.

The Minor Planet Center uses the minor planet provisional designations A849 GA and A900 GA for Hygiea, though these are only retrospective extensions of the new-style provisional designation scheme established in 1925. While the provisional designation A849 GA refers to the discovery date of Hygiea, the designation A900 GA refers to the date when Hygiea was serendipitously observed and catalogued (as Arequipa 38) by the Harvard College Observatory's photographic sky survey at Arequipa, Peru in 1900. (Note: In the new-style provisional designation scheme for pre-1925 minor planet discoveries, the designation begins with the letter A followed by three digits corresponding to the year of discovery ("A849" for 1849, and "A900" for 1900) and ends with two letters, with the first indicating the discovery date's half-month ("G" for the first half of April) and the second indicating the order of discovery in that half-month ("A" meaning first minor planet discovered in that half-month).)

Hygiea has seen some minor astrological use, though its symbol was confused once again, with Asclepsius's rod replaced by Mercury's caduceus:, though in a more elaborate form (U+2BDA ⯚) than the caduceus symbol of the planet Mercury. The caduceus has long been mistaken for the rod of Asclepius (see caduceus as a symbol of medicine).

=== Classification ===
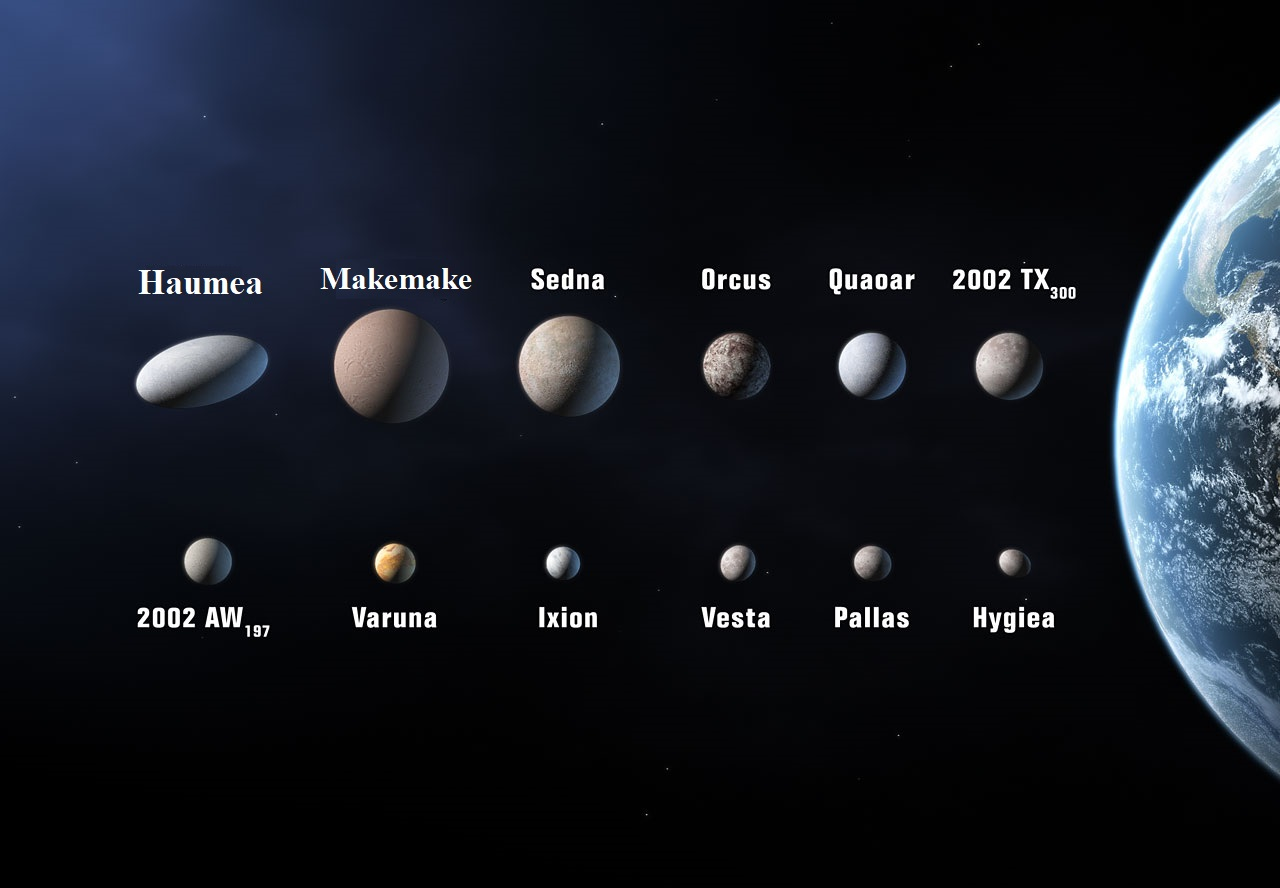
This graphic used in the IAU 2006 draft proposal listed Hygiea as a potential planet.

While the first four asteroids discovered—Ceres (1801), Pallas (1802), Juno (1804), and Vesta (1807)—were considered planets during the first half of the 19th century (with some astronomers continuing to consider them as such until the end of the century), the discovery of Hygiea occurred when the classification of asteroids was already evolving. Hygiea was referred to as a planet in the following years after its discovery, though by 1852 astronomers have also called Hygiea a minor planet or an asteroid. These terms were introduced prior to Hygiea's discovery and became more used with the discovery of more asteroids beginning in the 1850s. From the second half of the 19th century, asteroids began to be treated in a predominantly collective way, grouped according to orbital or spectral characteristics, with less attention to the individual object.

In 2006, the International Astronomical Union's (IAU) committee for drafting a new definition of planet had considered classifying Hygiea among the planets or the newly-coined category of dwarf planets, if it were found that the asteroid is massive enough to be shaped predominantly by hydrostatic equilibrium. This proposal for the definition of planet has since been revised and adopted to decree that a planet must orbit the Sun, have sufficient mass to attain a spherical shape by hydrostatic equilibrium, and clear its neighbourhood; objects that satisfy all but the last criterion are considered dwarf planets. Since 2019, telescope images have resolved Hygiea's nearly spherical shape, suggesting that it may have reached hydrostatic equilibrium. Because Hygiea already orbits the Sun and is located in the asteroid belt where it has not cleared its orbital neighborhood, Hygiea's nearly spherical shape could qualify it as a dwarf planet, according to Pierre Vernazza and collaborators who studied Hygiea with telescope imaging. If so, Hygiea could be the smallest dwarf planet known. However, the IAU has not yet officially classified Hygiea as a dwarf planet.

== Orbit ==
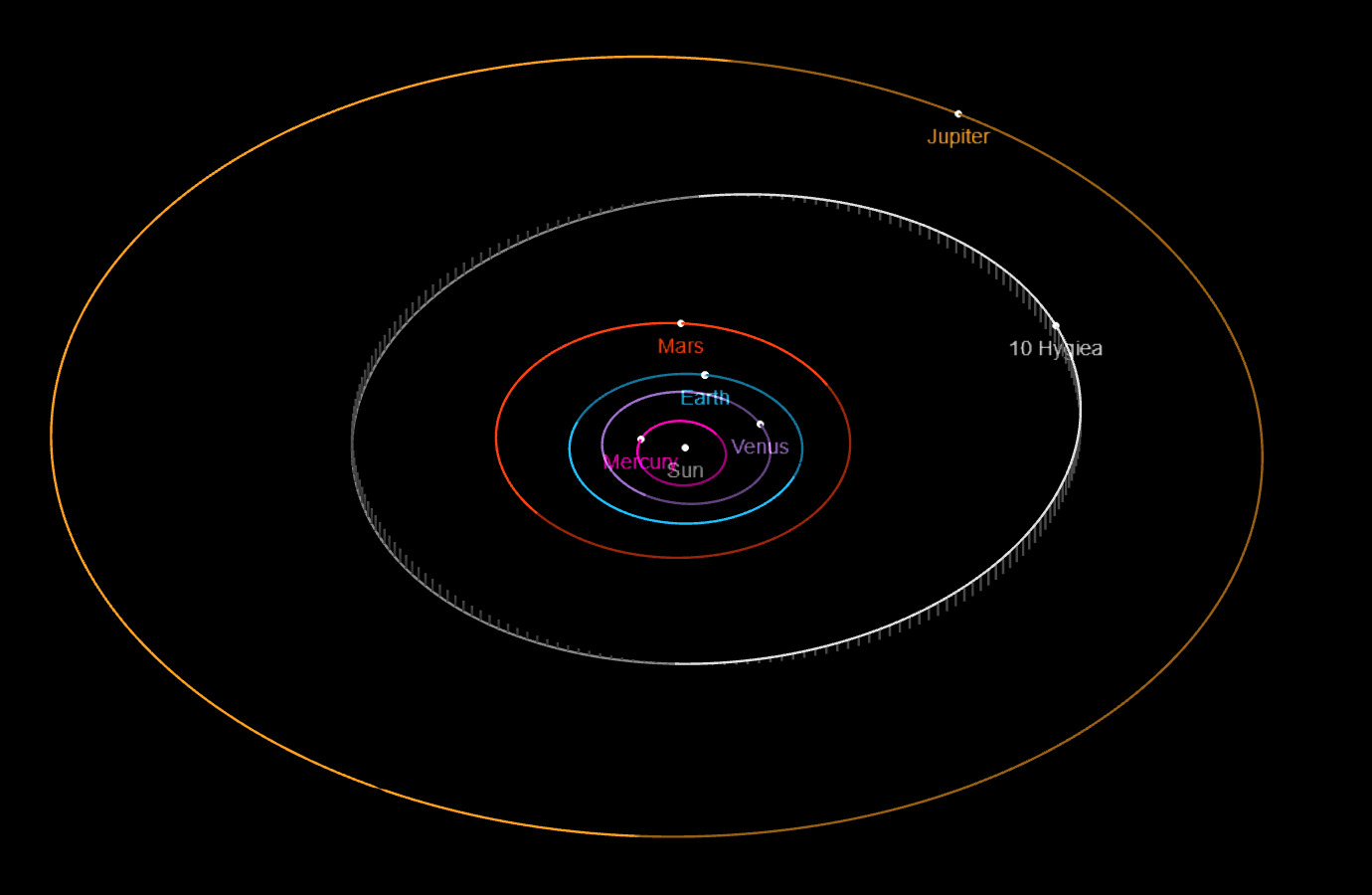
Diagram of Hygiea's orbit (white), with the inner planets' and Jupiter's orbits labelled

Hygiea orbits the Sun at an average distance (semi-major axis) of 3.15 AU (470 million km; 290 million mi), which places it in the outer portion of the main asteroid belt between Mars and Jupiter. Hygiea has an orbital period of 5.59 Earth years and follows an elliptical orbit where its distance from the Sun ranges between 2.81 AU (420 million km; 260 million mi) at perihelion to 3.49 AU (520 million km; 320 million mi) at aphelion. Hygiea has a relatively low orbital inclination of 3.8° with respect to the ecliptic plane. In its current orbit, Hygiea never comes closer than 1.24 AU (186 million km; 115 million mi) to Mars and 1.54 AU (230 million km; 143 million mi) to Jupiter. An n-body solution that accounts for the gravity of the planets and the 16 largest asteroids shows that Hygiea will come to perihelion on 15 February 2028.

Hygiea is in a three-body mean motion orbital resonance with Jupiter and Saturn. In this resonance, the mean motions or orbital frequencies of Jupiter, Saturn, and Hygiea follow the relation $8n_{\rm Jupiter} - 4n_{\rm Saturn} - 3n_{\rm Hygiea} = 0$, where a linear combination of their mean motions ($n$) with integer coefficients equals zero. Simulations show that this three-body resonance leads to a chaotic evolution in Hygiea's orbit, with a short Lyapunov time between 14,000 and 16,000 years. This means that changes in Hygiea's orbit become exponentially less predictable over this time scale.

Other asteroids occasionally pass close to Hygiea, sometimes close enough that their trajectories become visibly perturbed or deflected by Hygiea's gravity. This allows astronomers to measure Hygiea's mass. A 2002 study identified 40 known asteroids that have passed within 0.05 AU (7.5 million km; 4.6 million mi) of Hygiea between 1970 and 2000. Over a time span of 30 million years, Hygiea's gravitational perturbations can cause the proper semi-major axes of close-passing asteroids to change by 0.000908 AU (136,000 km; 84,400 mi).

== Hygiea family ==
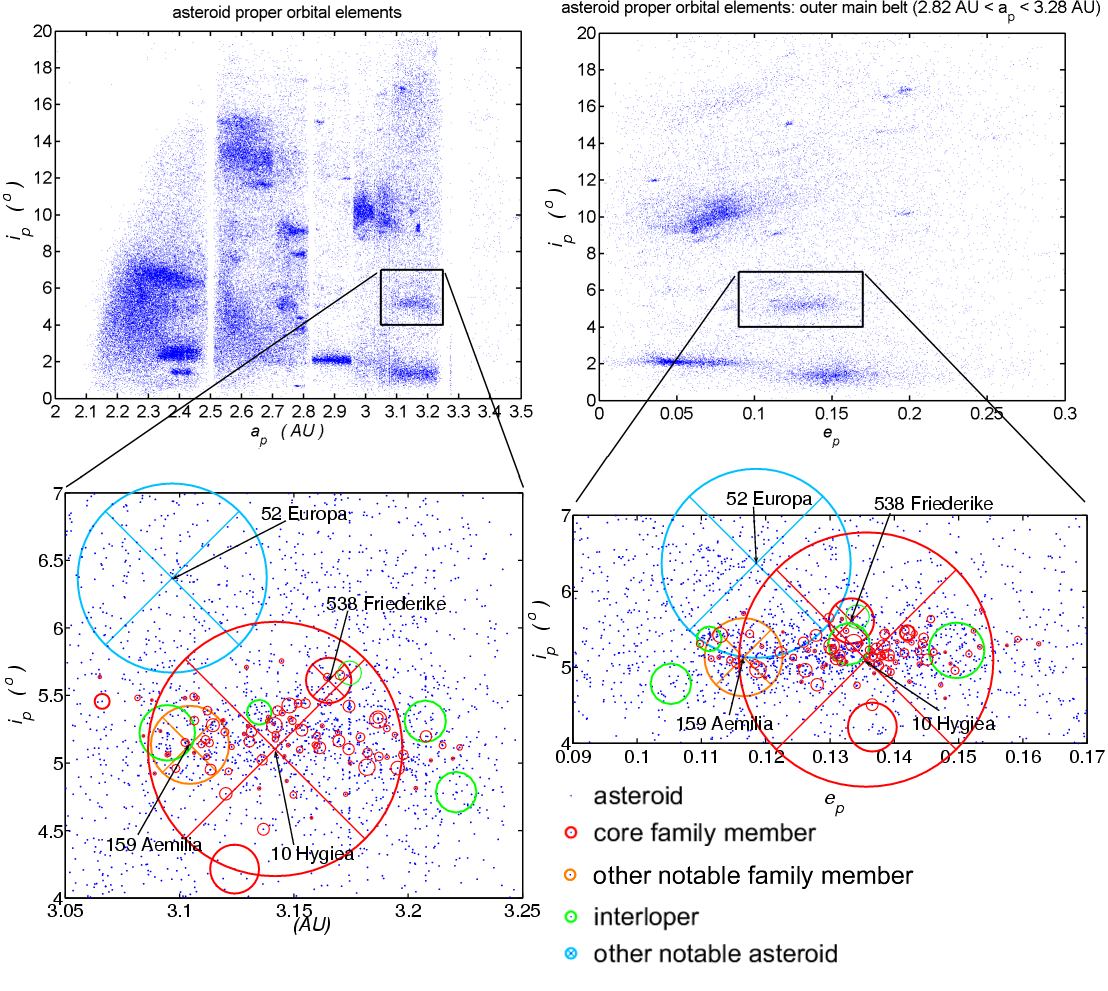
Location and structure of the Hygiea family

Hygiea is the parent body of the Hygiea family, an asteroid family comprising over 7,000 known asteroids that share similar orbital and compositional characteristics with Hygiea. The Hygiea family is the most populous asteroid family in the outer main belt, and is believed to have formed by a giant impact on Hygiea that ejected at least 1.7% of the asteroid's original mass about 2 to 3 billion years ago. The impactor that formed the Hygiea family was probably between 75 and 150 km (47 and 93 mi) in diameter. Hygiea contains almost all the mass (over 98%) of the family.

== Rotation ==
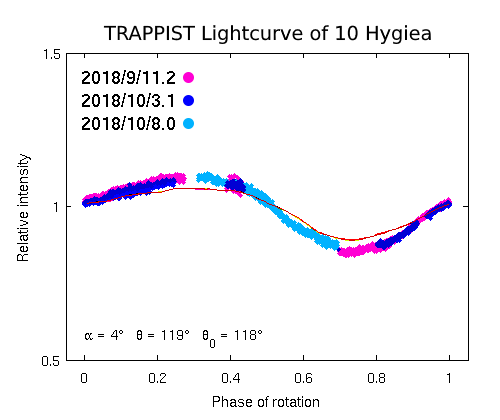
Rotational light curve of Hygiea measured by the TRAPPIST telescope in 2018

Simulation of Hygiea's retrograde (clockwise) rotation

The rotation period of Hygiea is about 13.83 hours (13 hours and 49.5 minutes), with an uncertainty of 0.2 seconds. This rotation period was determined via direct imaging and analysis of Hygiea's light curve, or changes in brightness over time. From Earth, Hygiea's brightness periodically fluctuates by up to 15% from its average value as albedo features on Hygiea's surface rotate in and out of view. The north pole of Hygiea's rotation axis points toward the ecliptic south, in the direction of ecliptic longitude 306°±3° and ecliptic latitude −29°±3°. This means Hygiea's rotation axis is highly tilted with an obliquity of 120° with respect to the ecliptic. Since Hygiea's obliquity is greater than 90°, it has a retrograde rotation, meaning it rotates backwards with respect to the direction of its orbit around the Sun.

Before it was directly imaged by telescopes in 2017–2018, Hygiea was thought to have a rotation period twice as long as the currently accepted value. The first measurements of Hygiea's rotation period beginning in the 1950s reported 18 hours while studies from 1991 and onward reported 27.6 hours. These past observations did not collect enough datapoints to produce reliable light curves, which led to these inaccurate rotation period measurements.

== Size and mass ==
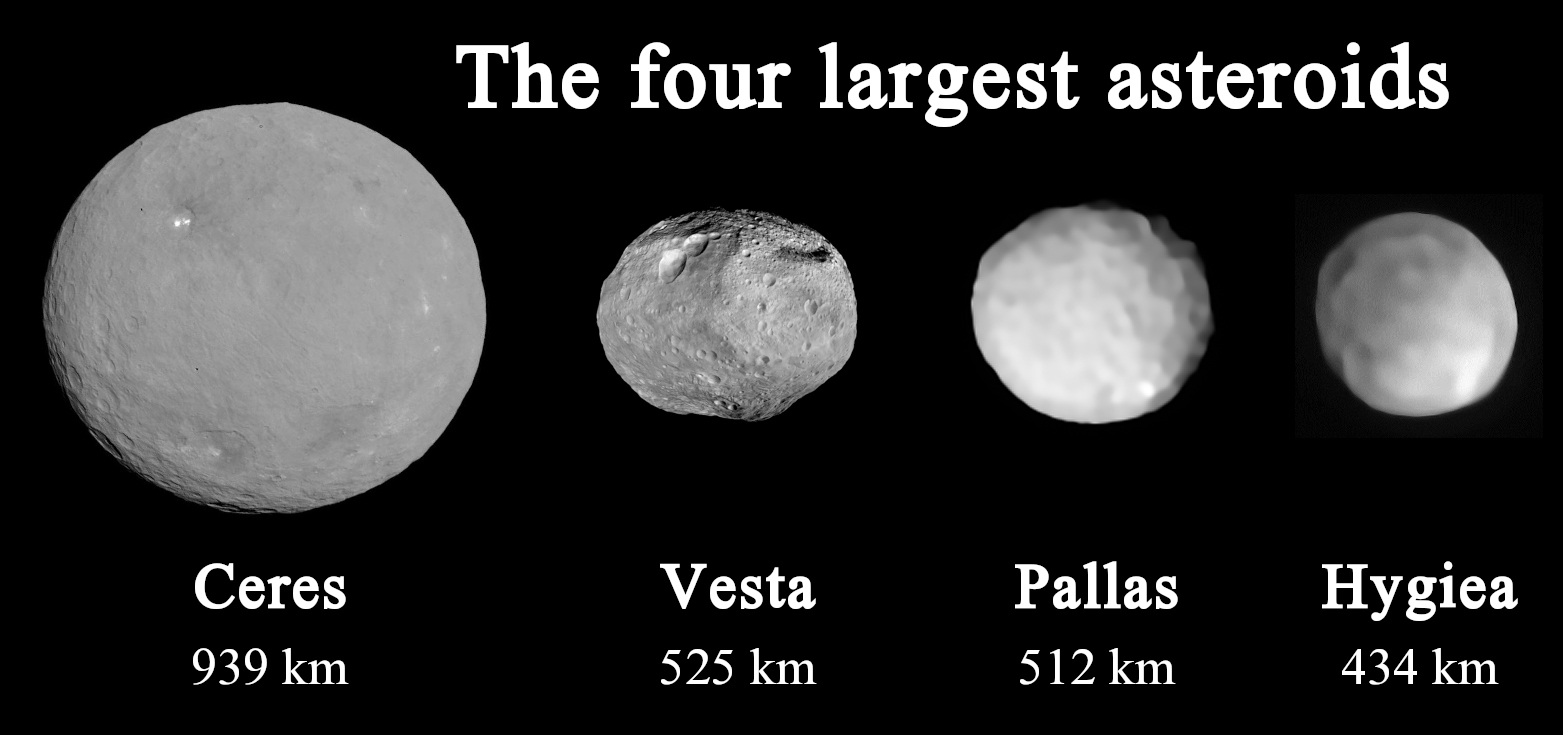
Relative sizes of the four largest asteroids. Hygiea is furthest right.

Hygiea is the fourth-largest main-belt asteroid by both volume and mass, with a volume-equivalent mean diameter of 433 ± 8 km (269 ± 5 mi) and a mass of (8.237±0.020)×10^{19} kg. Compared to the largest asteroid Ceres, Hygiea is less than half its diameter and is roughly 10% as massive. Hygiea constitutes 3% of the total mass of the entire main belt and is the largest asteroid in the outer main belt. The four largest asteroids (Ceres, Pallas, Vesta, and Hygiea) together make up a little more than half of the entire main belt's mass. These four largest asteroids have sometimes been collectively referred to as the "Big Four" by astronomers, although historically this term meant the first four asteroids discovered (Ceres, Pallas, Juno, and Vesta). Hygiea was not recognized as the fourth-largest asteroid until 1974, when David Morrison measured its diameter and albedo for the first time by using its infrared thermal emission.

The best estimate for Hygiea's diameter was measured via direct imaging using the Very Large Telescope (VLT) in Chile, whose atmospheric turbulence-correcting adaptive optics could resolve the asteroid in high angular resolution. Hygiea's mass was measured by observing how its gravity deflects the paths of other asteroids that pass near it. This requires an extensive number of observations with accurate positional measurements of the deflected asteroid before and after its close approach. The measurement of Hygiea's mass through this method was first attempted in 1986, with the analysis of a past close approach by the asteroid 829 Academia (which passed 0.006 AU or 900 thousand km or 560 thousand mi from Hygiea on 19 May 1927). Hygiea's mass has since been refined with additional asteroid close approaches and more accurate observations.

== Geology ==
=== Shape, craters, and topography ===
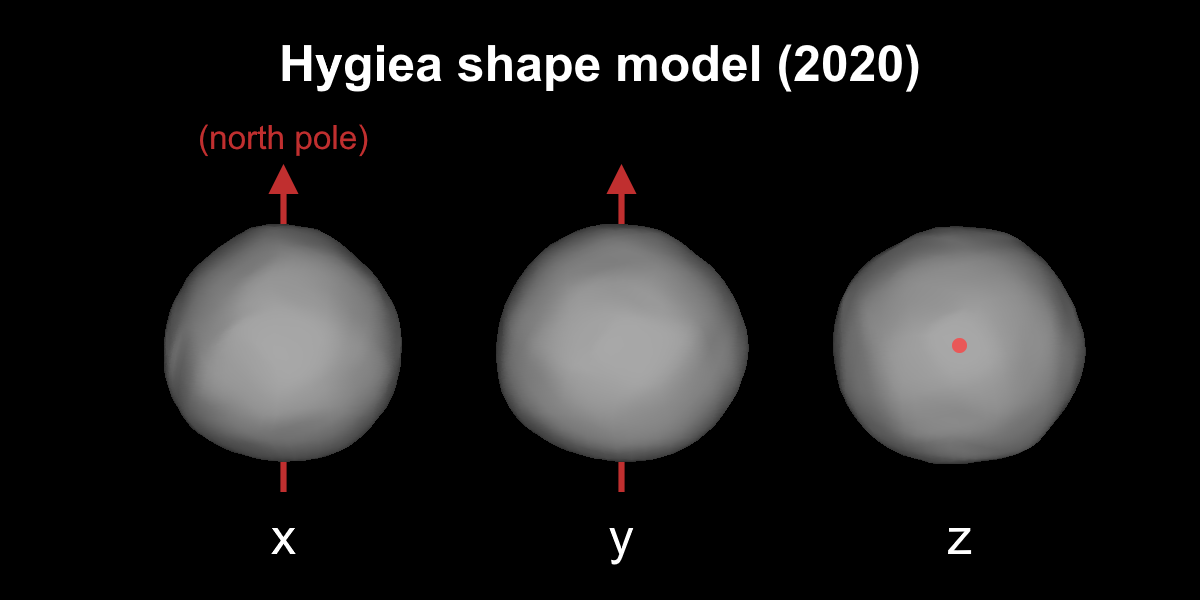
Model of Hygiea's nearly spherical shape as seen from three mutually orthogonal views

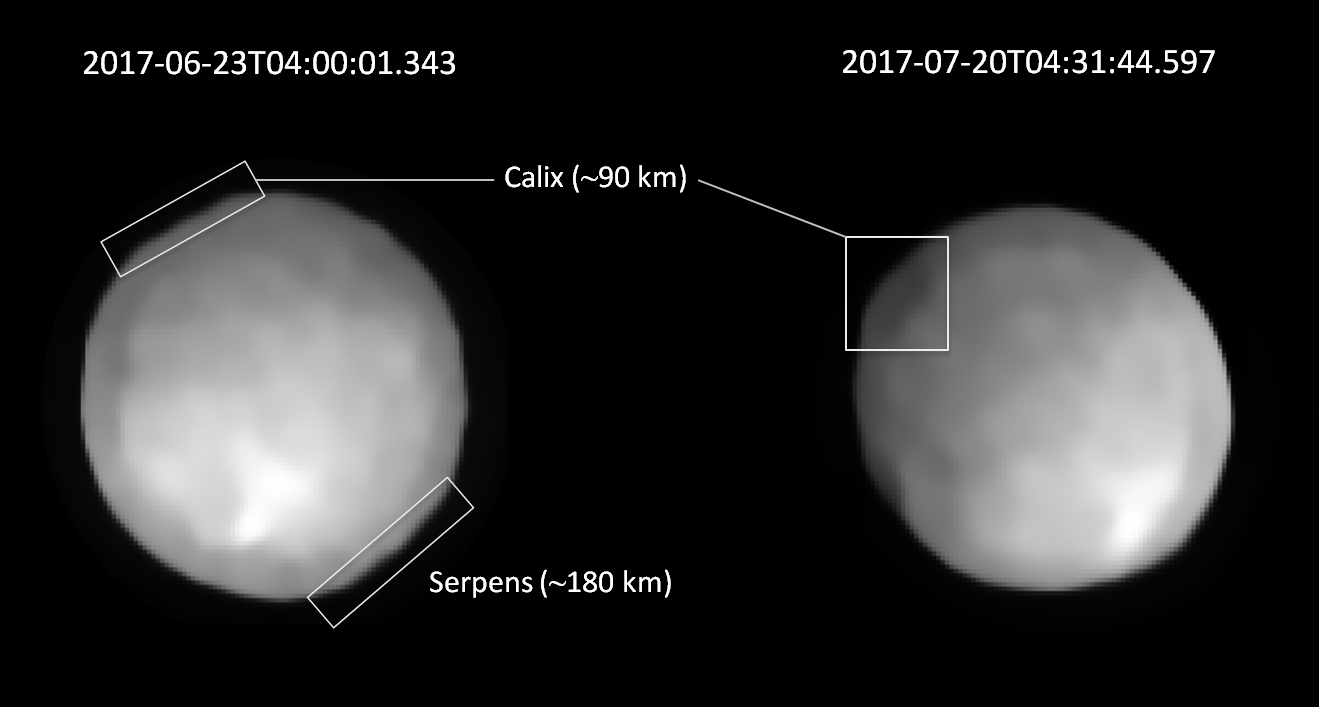
Hygiea's two large craters "Serpens" and "Calix" identified in VLT images from 2017. A bright spot is visible to the left of Serpens.

Hygiea is a nearly spherical or ellipsoidal object whose diametric dimensions are 450 km × 430 km × 424 km (280 mi × 267 mi × 263 mi), with an uncertainty of ±10 km (6.2 mi) for the equatorial axes and ±20 km (12 mi) for the polar axis. It is the second-most spherical main-belt asteroid after Ceres. The nearly spherical shape of Hygiea suggests it may be in hydrostatic equilibrium, having attained its shape by its own gravity. Specifically, Hygiea's polar flattening and specific angular momentum closely matches that of a Maclaurin spheroid, which is the shape assumed by a rotating self-gravitating fluid in hydrostatic equilibrium.

In contrast to the larger asteroid Vesta, Hygiea lacks large impact craters or basins that would otherwise deform its shape from a sphere. Only two craters on Hygiea have been confidently identified in VLT imaging, with their respective diameters being 180 ± 15 km (111.8 ± 9.3 mi) and 97 ± 10 km (60.3 ± 6.2 mi). Both craters appear to have central peaks. Vernazza and collaborators who studied these images have informally named the larger crater "Serpens" and smaller crater "Calix", after the Latin words for 'snake' and 'cup', respectively. These names, which are not approved by the IAU, were chosen because their eponyms commonly appear in symbols of Hygiea.

Besides Serpens and Calix, VLT images of Hygiea show no obvious or bowl-shaped craters larger than 30 km (19 mi) in diameter. Ceres similarly lacks large bowl-shaped craters and is instead dominated by flat-floored complex craters, which are difficult to see from Earth—this may be the case for Hygiea. An abundance of flat-floored craters on Hygiea could indicate a water ice-rich subsurface, which would allow for the relaxation of its surface topography.

Although Hygiea lacks major impact basins, the existence of the Hygiea family points to a major collisional event in its past. Rather than leaving a giant impact basin like on Vesta, the impact is thought to have completely shattered Hygiea, which erased all of its pre-existing surface features. Simulations of the giant impact show that most of Hygiea's debris reaccumulated into a fluid-like body, which was able to relax into a sphere by its own gravity. The present-day shape of Hygiea suggests it solidified around four hours after the impact. Other large asteroids that are parents of asteroid families, such as 8 Flora and 31 Euphrosyne, have also been found to show roughly spherical shapes and are thus believed to have undergone similar collisional disruption and reaccumulation.

=== Surface ===
==== Albedo, temperature, and regolith ====
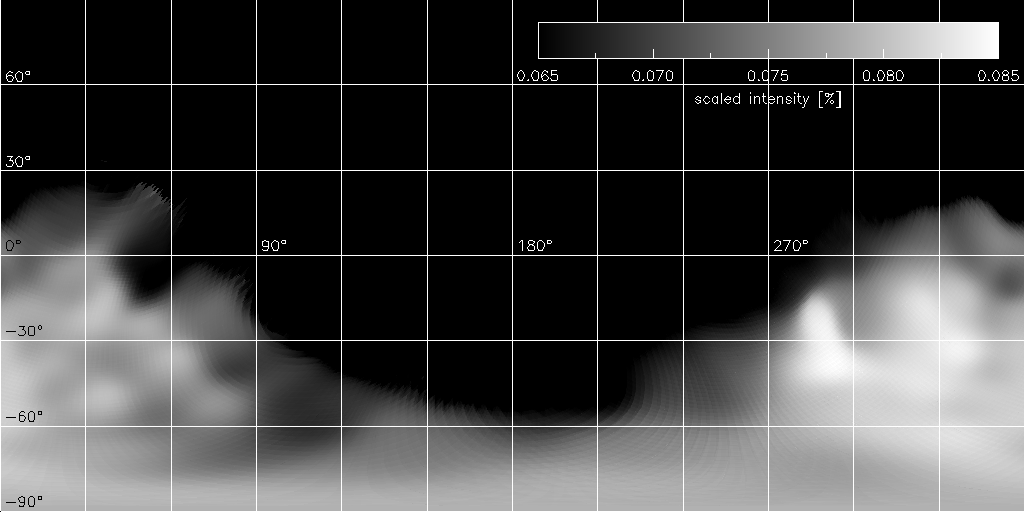
Albedo and shadow map of Hygiea's southern hemisphere in an equirectangular projection, constructed from VLT images. A bright spot is present at longitude 290° and latitude −30°.

The surface of Hygiea is dark, with an average visual geometric albedo estimated between 6.3% and 7.2%. The apparent brightness or reflectance varies across Hygiea's surface due to variations in albedo and shadows cast by topographic features. VLT images of Hygiea show several bright spots on its surface, with the brightest one located on Hygiea's southern hemisphere at longitude 290° and latitude −30°. The brightest spot is 10% brighter than the average reflectance of Hygiea's surface. A large dark region is present along Hygiea's equator at longitude 60° and latitude 0°, though it is most likely a shadowed region. The albedo and reflectance variation across Hygiea's surface resembles those of Ceres.

The temperature on Hygiea's surface depends on the asteroid's rotation, distance from the Sun, and the properties of its surface regolith. While the surface of Hygiea have been observed to reach temperatures as high as 230 K (−43 °C; −46 °F) at the subsolar point, the surface cools down as it rotates away from the Sun, which averages out the temperature. Between Hygiea's perihelion and aphelion distances, the average temperature can range from 150 to 180 K (−123 to −93 °C; −190 to −136 °F). At Hygiea's semi-major axis, the average temperature would be 163 K (−110 °C; −166 °F).

Astronomers have described Hygiea as a "fairly dusty object", with a regolith layer consisting mostly of fine dust rather than coarse rock. This fine regolith has a low thermal inertia, meaning it radiates away heat more easily and leads to cooler temperatures on Hygiea's surface. The regolith of Hygiea may be dustier (and thus finer) than that of Earth's Moon, which could imply a more mature regolith that has experienced more space weathering. The regolith layer of Hygiea is estimated to be at least 8 cm (3.1 in) deep. These properties of Hygiea's regolith were inferred from the asteroid's lower-than-expected temperature and thermal emission in infrared, submillimetre, and microwave wavelengths.

==== Composition ====
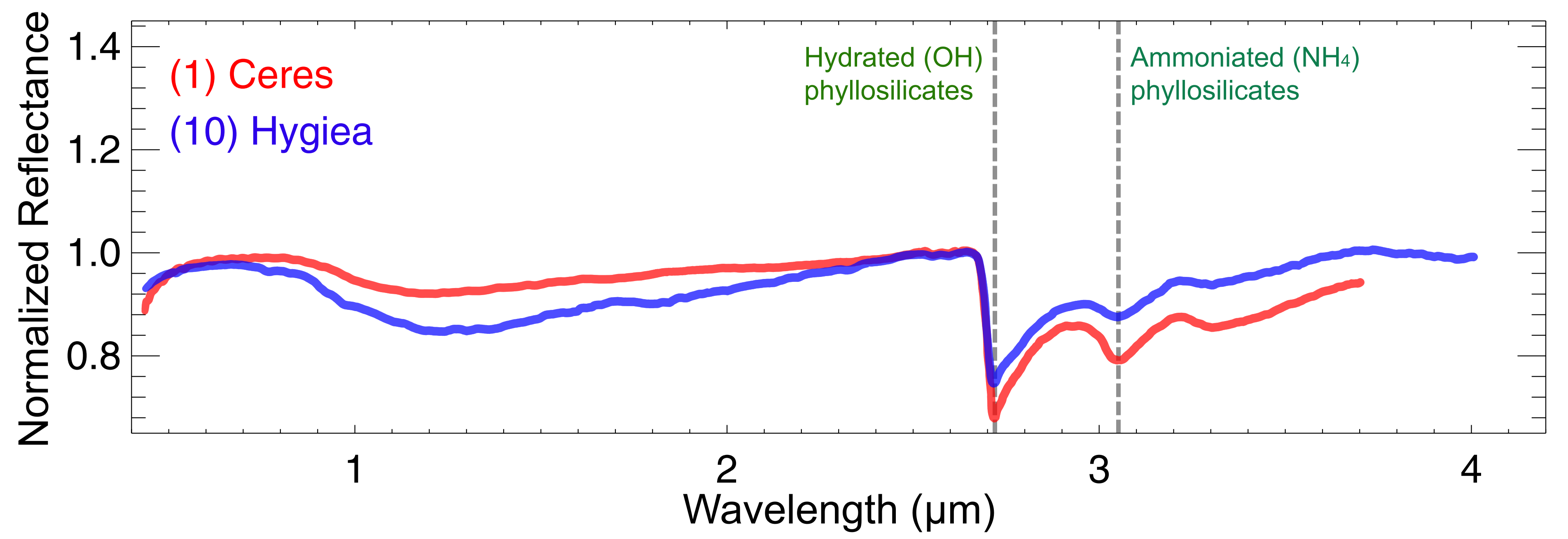
The similar spectra of Ceres (red) and Hygiea (blue) in visible to near-infrared wavelengths indicate they have similar compositions. Both spectra show absorption signatures of hydrated and ammoniated phyllosilicates.

Hygiea is a carbonaceous asteroid whose surface is largely composed of hydrated and ammoniated silicate minerals (phyllosilicates) and carbonates, with hints of water ice. This composition is inferred from spectroscopic observations of Hygiea, whose visible and near-infrared spectrum characterize it as a C-type asteroid. More broadly, it makes Hygiea a member of the C spectral complex, which is common in the outer main belt where Hygiea resides.

The spectrum and composition of Hygiea's surface is very similar to those of carbonaceous chondrite meteorites and Ceres, which has led some astronomers to call Hygiea a "primitive" object and a "virtual spectral twin of Ceres". Hygiea's resemblance to carbonaceous chondrites (particularly CM chondrites) suggests it shares a similar history of having undergone little thermal alteration and some aqueous alteration of its original minerals, hence its likely primitive nature. Slight differences between the near-infrared spectra of Hygiea and Ceres indicate they have slightly different concentrations of hydrated and ammoniated minerals. High resolution near-infrared spectroscopy by the James Webb Space Telescope has found that Hygiea's phyllosilicates are magnesium-rich and appear to match ammoniated saponite.

Ground-based observations have shown that the near-infrared spectrum of Hygiea varies over time, which implies there is compositional variation across Hygiea's surface. A 2011 study by Vladimir Busarev observed Hygiea's spectral type changing between C, B, and F over the course of its rotation, which he interpreted as an indication of local dehydration of Hygiea's surface material, possibly as a result of heating by impacts. A 2019 study by Andrew Rivkin and colleagues reported changes in the 3.1 μm absorption feature in Hygiea's near-infrared spectrum over a time scale of years. While this absorption feature is often attributed to ammoniated minerals, its variations could also correspond to either hydrated minerals or potentially water ice frost. Rivkin and colleagues speculated that the variations could be caused by exposed subsurface material on some parts of Hygiea's surface, although they do not appear to be correlated with one particular surface location.

=== Density and interior ===
Hygiea's bulk density has been estimated as either 1.944±0.250 g/cm^{3} or 2.06±0.20 g/cm^{3}, based on measurements of its diameter and mass from 2020 and 2021, respectively. Hygiea's bulk density is similar to that of Ceres (2.16 g/cm^{3}), which together with Hygiea's large size suggests it could have a differentiated interior. Hygiea likely has a water ice-rich subsurface, as hinted by Hygiea's bulk density, spectroscopic detections of water ice, and its lack of large, bowl-shaped craters. Assuming the higher density estimate of 2.06±0.20 g/cm^{3}, Hygiea would be among the denser members of the largest C-type asteroids (diameters larger than 300 km or 190 mi), whose densities range between 1.5 to 2.16 g/cm^{3} and may have negligible interior macroporosities, according to Vernazza and colleagues. They further speculated that the higher densities of Hygiea and other large C-type asteroids may be due to a more lithified or compacted interior, as a result of significant aqueous alteration.

== Observation and exploration ==
=== Observation ===
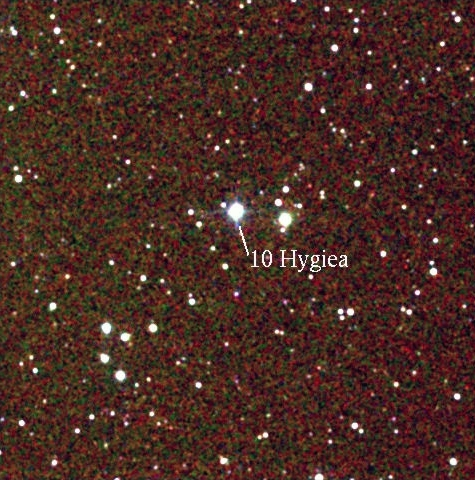
Image of 10 Hygiea taken by the 2MASS survey

Despite its size, Hygiea appears very dim when observed from Earth. This is due to its dark surface and its position in the outer main belt. For this reason, six smaller asteroids were observed before Annibale de Gasparis discovered Hygiea on 12 April 1849.

Although it is the largest body in its region, due to its dark surface and farther-than-average distance from the Sun, Hygiea appears very dim when observed from Earth. In fact, it is the third dimmest of the first twenty-three asteroids discovered, with only 13 Egeria and 17 Thetis having lower mean opposition magnitudes. At most oppositions, Hygiea has a magnitude of around +10.2, which is as much as four orders fainter than Vesta, and observation calls for at least a 4-inch (100 mm) telescope to resolve. However, at a perihelic opposition, Hygiea can reach +9.1 magnitude and may just be resolvable with 10 × 50 binoculars, unlike the next two largest asteroids in the asteroid belt, 704 Interamnia and 511 Davida, which are always beyond binocular visibility.

A total of 17 stellar occultations by Hygiea have been tracked by Earth-based astronomers, including two (in 2002 and 2014) that were seen by a large number of observers. The observations have been used to constrain Hygiea's size, shape and rotation axis. The Hubble Space Telescope has resolved the asteroid and ruled out the presence of any orbiting companions larger than about 16 kilometres (9.9 mi) in diameter.

=== Exploration ===
Hygiea has not been explored by any space probe. In 2006, Mark V. Sykes and others from the Planetary Science Institute proposed the Exploring the Very Earliest Epoch (EVE) mission to NASA, as part of the Discovery Program. The proposal, which did not get approved, suggested launching a copy of the Dawn probe to Hygiea in October 2011 and arriving to the asteroid via rendezvous in 2021. In 2013, Pierre Vernazza and Philippe Lamy proposed the medium-class mission INSIDER for the European Space Agency's Space Programme. The proposal, which also did not get approved, suggested rendezvousing and orbiting around two or three large main-belt asteroids before releasing one or two landers. Hygiea and 24 Themis were among the potential targets of the INSIDER mission concept. The exploration of primitive main-belt asteroids like Hygiea could provide clues to the processes that led to the formation of the Solar System.

== See also ==
- 704 Interamnia – the fifth-largest main-belt asteroid, whose shape is close to hydrostatic equilibrium
- 65 Cybele – one of the largest main-belt asteroids, whose shape is also close to hydrostatic equilibrium
- Hygiea family – group of asteroids likely formed by a collision involving Hygiea
- List of former planets
- List of gravitationally rounded objects of the Solar System
