= 13 Egeria =

Main-belt asteroid

- A deconvolved image of 13 Egeria by VLT/SPHERE

Discovery
- Discovered by: Annibale de Gasparis
- Discovery site: Naples Obs.
- Discovery date: 2 November 1850

Designations
- Pronunciation: /ɪˈdʒɪəriə/
- Named after: Egeria
- Alternative designations: 1850 VA
- Minor planet category: Main belt
- Adjectives: Egerian
- Symbol: (historical) (variant)

Orbital characteristics
- Epoch 17.0 October 2024 (JD 2460600.5)
- Uncertainty parameter 0
- Observation arc: 63566 days (174.03 yr)
- Aphelion: 2.79788 AU
- Perihelion: 2.35759 AU
- Semi-major axis: 2.57774 AU
- Eccentricity: 0.085403
- Orbital period (sidereal): 4.14 yr (1511.7 d)
- Average orbital speed: 18.56 km/s
- Mean anomaly: 305.547°
- Mean motion: 0° 14^{m} 17.34^{s} / day
- Inclination: 16.532°
- Longitude of ascending node: 43.208°
- Time of perihelion: 2 June 2025
- Argument of perihelion: 79.222°
- Earth MOID: 1.43636 AU
- Jupiter MOID: 2.35842 AU
- T_{Jupiter}: 3.363

Physical characteristics
- Dimensions: 238 km × 199 km × 182 km (± 12 km × 11 km × 10 km)
- Mean diameter: 202±3 km
- Mass: (7.24±0.34)×10^{18} kg (Note: Calculated from its standard gravitational parameter GM = 0.483±0.023 km^{3}/s^{2}.)
- Mean density: 1.68±0.11 g/cm^{3}
- Equatorial surface gravity: ≈0.0580 m/s^{2}
- Equatorial escape velocity: ≈0.1098 km/s
- Synodic rotation period: 7.046664±0.000003 h
- Axial tilt: 59°
- Pole ecliptic longitude: 38°±5°
- Pole ecliptic latitude: 31°±5°
- Geometric albedo: 0.087; 0.049 ± 0.028; 0.085 ± 0.007
- Temperature: ~174 K
- Spectral type: G-type asteroid
- Apparent magnitude: 9.71 to 12.46
- Absolute magnitude (H): 6.91; 6.74

13 Egeria is a large main-belt G-type asteroid. It was discovered by Annibale de Gasparis on 2 November 1850. Egeria was named by Urbain Le Verrier, whose computations led to the discovery of Neptune, after the mythological nymph Egeria of Aricia, Italy, the wife of Numa Pompilius, second king of Rome.

== History & Discovery ==
Egeria was discovered on the evening of 2 November 1850 by Italian astronomer Annibale de Gasparis at the Astronomical Observatory of Capodimonte. Whereas de Gasparis's previous two discoveries—10 Hygiea and 11 Parthenope—were identified by comparison with the Berlin Academy star charts, Egeria was identified using his own ecliptic charts intended for finding new celestial objects. Egeria's discovery was announced in December 1850 by astronomer Benjamin A. Gould through The Astronomical Journal. Following the discovery, de Gasparis delegated the naming rights of the asteroid to Urbain Le Verrier. Le Verrier chose to name the asteroid after Egeria, a mythological nymph and councillor of Numa Pompilius.

Upon its discovery, both de Gasparis and Gould labelled Egeria as a new planet. However, by the mid-1800s, the classification and terminology of the asteroids were quickly evolving. Soon after Egeria's discovery, other astronomers described it as an "asteroid" or a "minor planet". Throughout the latter half of the 19th century, the terms "asteroid" and "minor planet" became favored, although some publications continued to label Egeria and other asteroids as planets.

In 1851, de Gasparis announced his chosen symbol for Egeria—that of a buckler. However, Gould had apparently not seen the announcement, and in an 1852 table of asteroid symbols he left Egeria's blank. No mention of a star was made, though in 1852 John Russell Hind included one in his drawn symbol for Egeria: (U+1CEC6 𜻆 in Unicode 17.0). The symbol is sometimes depicted with a round form, though only Hind's form was encoded. As the number of asteroids assigned a symbol grew in number through the mid-1800s, the practicality of assigning each a unique astronomical symbol was questioned. In 1851, astronomer Johann Franz Encke proposed an alternative system of a number—denoting the object's order of discovery—inscribed in a circle. For Egeria, this would be ⑬. This system was quickly adopted by astronomers, though eventually astronomers switched from an inscribed circle to parentheses and eventually a bare number—hence (13) Egeria or 13 Egeria in modern notation.

== Orbit ==
Egeria orbits the Sun at an average distance—its semi-major axis—of 2.58 astronomical units (AU), placing it within the main asteroid belt and near the 3:1 mean-motion resonance with Jupiter. Along its orbit, its distance from the Sun varies between 2.36 AU at perihelion to 2.80 AU at aphelion due to its orbital eccentricity of 0.09. Its orbit is inclined by 16.5° with respect to the ecliptic, and it takes 4.14 years to complete one orbit. Egeria is classified as a background asteroid, as it does not belong to an asteroid family.

== Physical properties ==
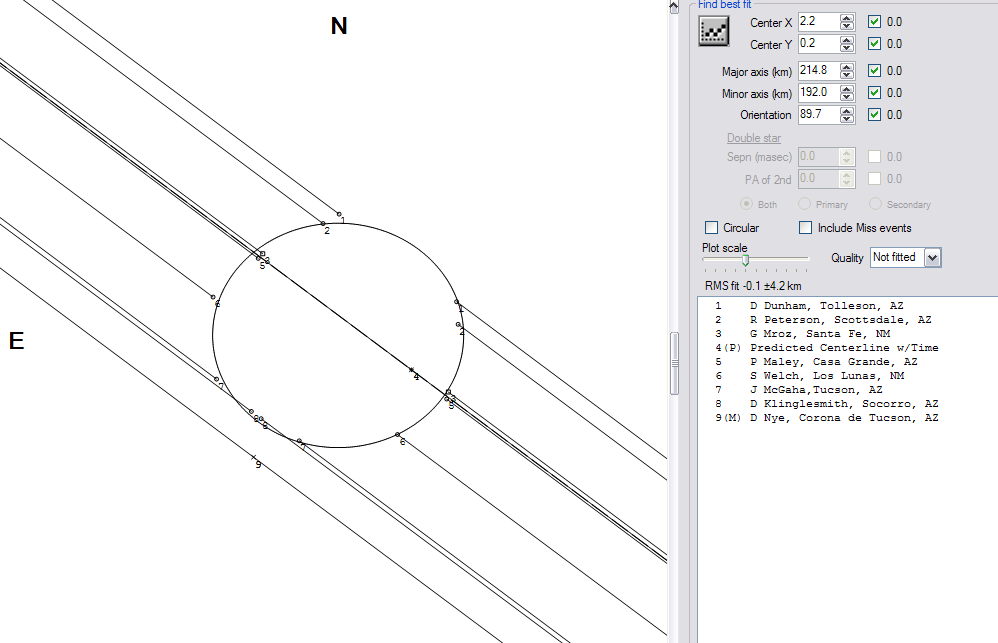
OCCULT4 visualization of Egeria's 2008 occultation event

Egeria occulted a star on 8 January 1992. Its disc was determined to be quite circular (217×196 km). On 22 January 2008, it occulted another star, and this occultation was timed by several observers in New Mexico and Arizona, coordinated by the IOTA Asteroid Occultation Program. The result showed that Egeria presented an approximately circular profile to Earth of 214.8×192 km, well in agreement with the 1992 occultation. It has also been studied by radar.

Egeria is a uncommon G-type asteroid which are rich in carbon compounds and dark in color. It may contain water bearing clays.

In 1988 a search for satellites or dust orbiting Egeria was performed using the UH88 telescope at the Mauna Kea Observatories, but the effort came up empty. Spectral analysis of Egeria shows it to be unusually high in water content, 10.5–11.5% water by mass.

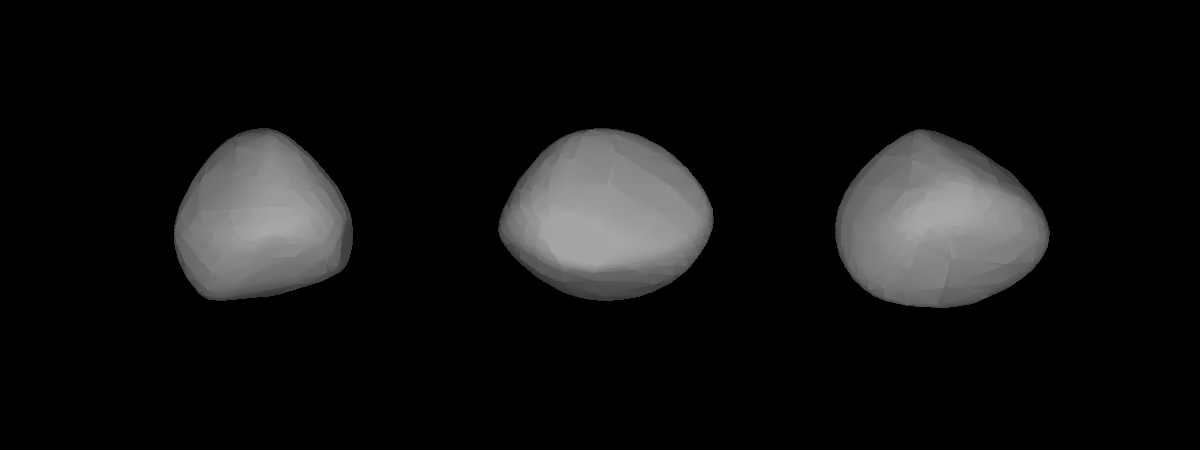
A three-dimensional model of 13 Egeria based on its light curve

== See also ==
- Former classification of planets
