= 511 Davida =

Large asteroid in the asteroid belt

- VLT-SPHERE image of Davida

Discovery
- Discovered by: R. S. Dugan
- Discovery date: May 30, 1903

Designations
- Designation: (511) Davida
- Pronunciation: /dəˈviːdə/, Latin Dāvīda
- Named after: David Peck Todd
- Alternative names: 1903 LU
- Minor planet category: main-belt · (outer); Meliboea
- Adjectives: Davidian /dəˈvɪdiən/

Orbital characteristics
- Epoch July 01, 2021 (JD 2459396.5, heliocentric)
- Aphelion: 3.759 AU
- Perihelion: 2.569 AU
- Semi-major axis: 3.163 AU
- Eccentricity: 0.188
- Orbital period (sidereal): 5.626 yr (2055 d)
- Mean anomaly: 113°
- Inclination: 15.94°
- Longitude of ascending node: 107.6°
- Argument of perihelion: 337.2°

Physical characteristics
- Dimensions: (359±18 × 293±20 × 253±17) km(357±2 × 294±2 × 231±50) km (Note: Measurements of the short axis are less precise than the other two, but also involve a discrepancy between fitting the convolved and deconvolved images (241±40 km), and fitting the edges (191±114 km).)
- Mean diameter: 298±4 km 289 ± 21 km
- Mass: (2.928±0.057)×10^{19} kg (Note: Calculated from its standard gravitational parameter GM = 1.954±0.038 km^{3}/s^{2}.)
- Mean density: 2.11±0.09 g/cm^{3}
- Synodic rotation period: 5.129365±0.000001 h
- Axial tilt: 62°
- Pole ecliptic longitude: 300° ± 2° 297° ± 2°
- Pole ecliptic latitude: 26° ± 2° 21° ± 2°
- Albedo: 0.063; 0.076±0.007 geometric (0.717±0.013 BV, 0.363±0.020)
- Temperature: ~160 K
- Spectral type: C
- Apparent magnitude: 9.50 to 12.98
- Absolute magnitude (H): 6.22; 6.43

511 Davida is a large C-type asteroid in the asteroid belt. It is one of the largest asteroids; approximately tied for 7th place, to within measurement uncertainties, and the 5th or 6th most massive. It was discovered by R. S. Dugan in 1903. Davida is named after David Peck Todd, an astronomy professor at Amherst College.

== Physical characteristics ==
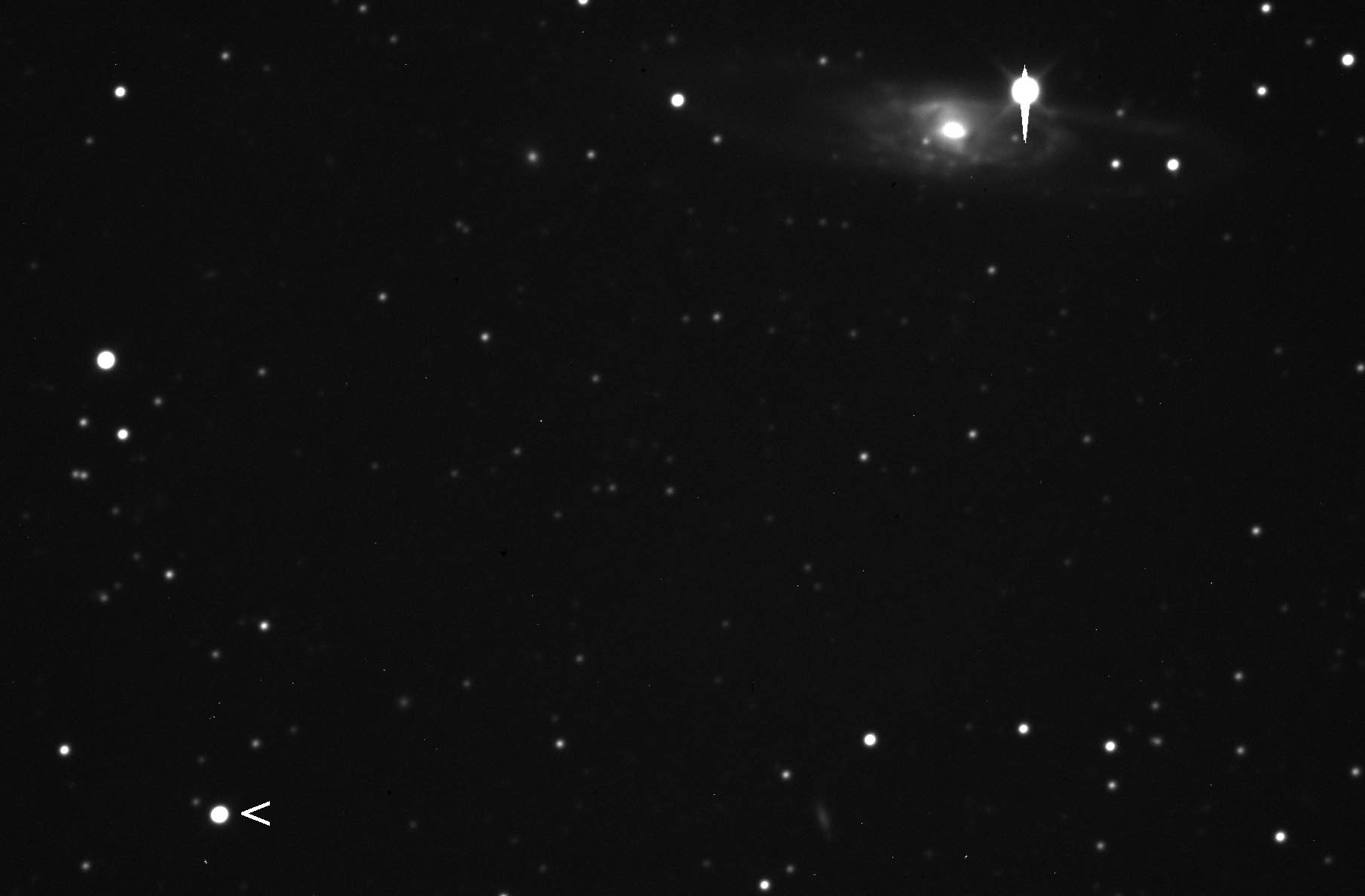
Asteroid 511 Davida (lower left at mag 12.5) near galaxy NGC 5792

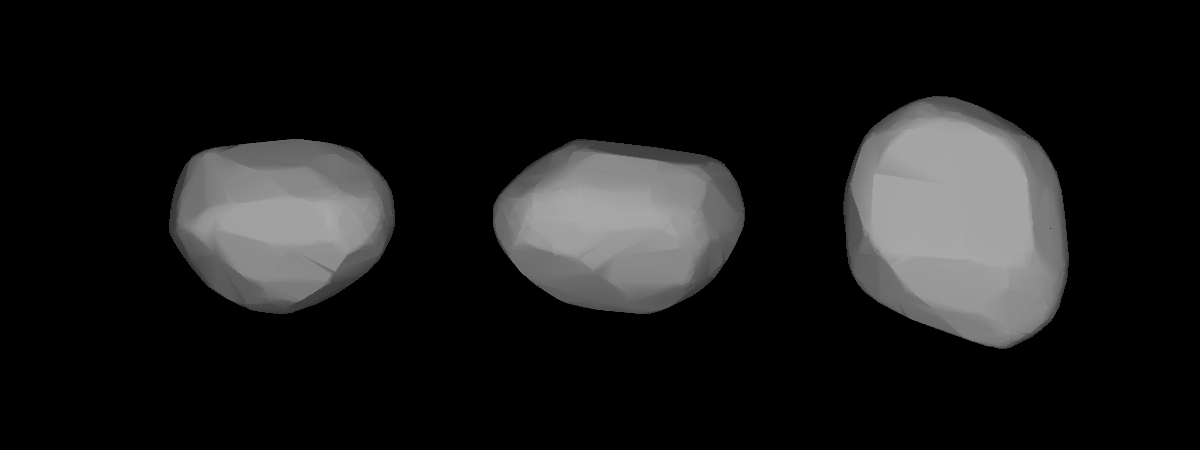
3D model of Davida based on lightcurve modeling

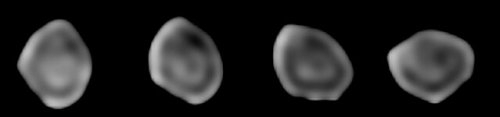
Keck telescope image sequence of Davida showing its rotation

Davida is approximately 280–300 km in diameter and comprises an estimated 1.5% of the total mass of the asteroid belt. (Note: "Baer Mass of 511 Davida" 0.220 / "Mass of Mbelt" 15 = 0.0146) It is a C-type asteroid, which means that it is dark in colouring with a carbonaceous chondrite composition.

From 2002 to 2007, astronomers at the Keck Observatory used the Keck II telescope, which is fitted with adaptive optics, to photograph Davida. The asteroid is not a dwarf planet: there are at least two promontories and at least one flat facet with 15-km deviations from a best-fit ellipsoid. The facet is presumably a 150-km global-scale crater like the ones seen on 253 Mathilde. Conrad et al. (2007) show that craters of this size "can be expected from the impactor size distribution, without likelihood of catastrophic disruption of Davida."

=== Mass ===
In 2001, Michalak estimated Davida to have a mass of (6.64±0.56)×10^{19} kg. (Note: (3.34±0.28)×10^{−11} solar masses, per Michalak (2001), extended dynamic model.) In 2007, Baer and Chesley estimated Davida to have a mass of (5.9±0.6)×10^{19} kg. As of 2010, Baer suggests Davida has a mass of (3.84±0.20)×10^{19} kg. This most recent estimate by Baer indicates that Davida is approximately tied with 704 Interamnia as the fifth-most-massive asteroid, though the error bars of Interamnia are large.

=== Composition ===
Davida's ore content is calculated to be large, and tops other asteroids in calculated worth, with 16 Psyche coming second with a large difference in hypothetical worth.

== Occultations ==
There have been 9 occultation events observed since 1987, many of which produced two or three chords. Two examples shown here.

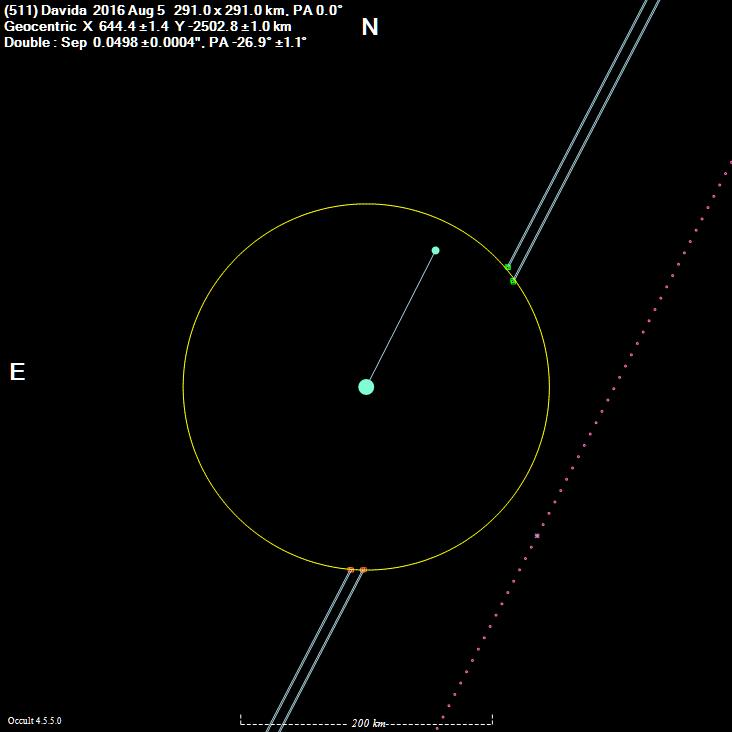
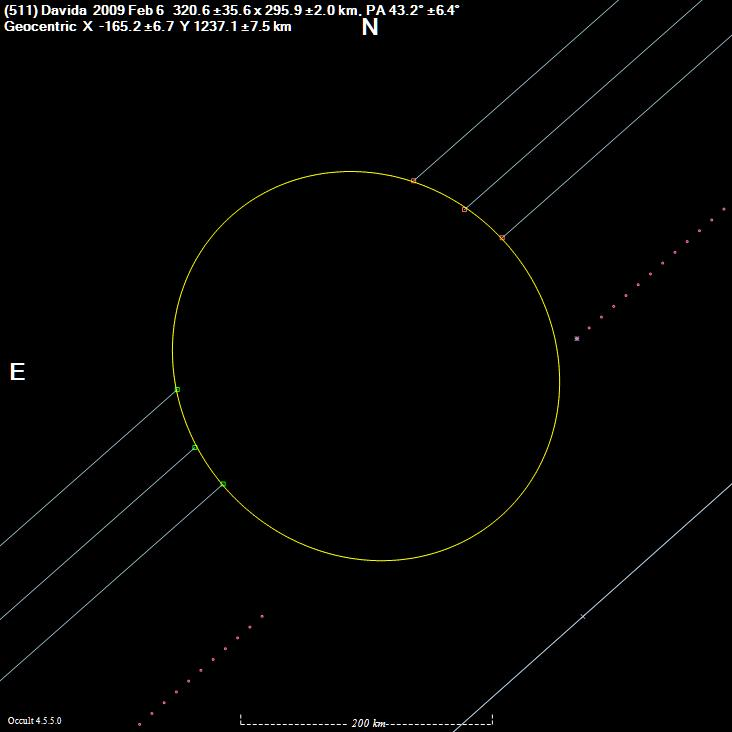
Occultations by 511 Davida: Left: Double chord occultation of TYC 5597-01223 on 5 August 2016, observed by two amateur astronomers in eastern Australia. Both observers noted step events, thereby detecting the star has two components. Right: Triple chord occultation of TYC 1964-00787, observed on 6 February 2009 by three astronomers in eastern United States.

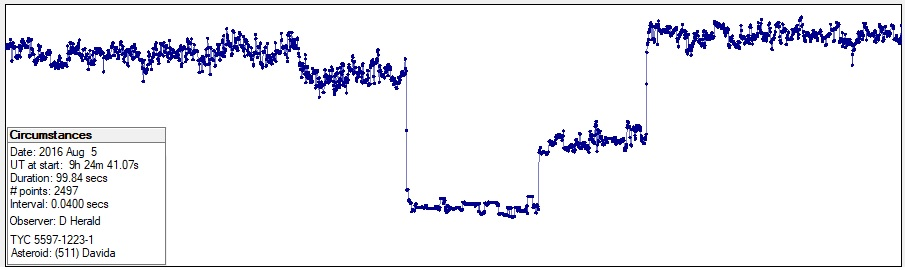
511 Davida occulted TYC 5597-01223 on 5 August 2016. Two observers recorded the event and both observed step events. Shown here is the step recording by Dave Herald.
