= 24 Themis =

Main-belt Themistian asteroid

- Deconvolved image of Themis by VLT-SPHERE

Discovery
- Discovered by: Annibale de Gasparis
- Discovery date: 5 April 1853

Designations
- Pronunciation: /ˈθiːmɪs/
- Named after: Themis
- Alternative designations: 1947 BA; 1955 OH
- Minor planet category: Main belt (Themis)
- Adjectives: Themistian /θɪˈmɪstiən/

Orbital characteristics
- Epoch 17.0 October 2024 (JD 2460600.5)
- Aphelion: 524.4 Gm (3.505 AU)
- Perihelion: 415.9 million km (2.780 AU)
- Semi-major axis: 470.2 million km (3.143 AU)
- Eccentricity: 0.1153
- Orbital period (sidereal): 2035 d (5.57 yr)
- Mean anomaly: 346.1°
- Inclination: 0.7368°
- Longitude of ascending node: 36.39°
- Argument of perihelion: 109.0°
- Earth MOID: 1.79422 AU
- Jupiter MOID: 1.50402 AU
- T_{Jupiter}: 3.199

Physical characteristics
- Dimensions: 232 × 220 × 176 ± 14 km
- Mean diameter: 208±3 km
- Mass: (6.85±0.30)×10^{18} kg (2025) (Note: Calculated from its standard gravitational parameter GM = 0.457±0.020 km^{3}/s^{2}.) (8.30±0.65)×10^{18} kg (2023)
- Mean density: 1.45±0.09 g/cm^{3} (2025); 1.76±0.16 g/cm^{3} (2023)
- Equatorial surface gravity: 0.042 m/s^{2}
- Equatorial escape velocity: 0.094 km/s
- Synodic rotation period: 8.374187 ± 0.000001 h (0.348924458 ± 4.2×10^{−8} d)
- Axial tilt: 18°
- Pole ecliptic longitude: 146°±3°
- Pole ecliptic latitude: 73°±3°
- Geometric albedo: 0.060 (calculated); 0.067
- Spectral type: C/B (B-V=0.68)
- Absolute magnitude (H): 7.24; 7.08

24 Themis is one of the largest asteroids in the asteroid belt. At roughly 200 kilometres (120 mi) in diameter, it is also the largest member of the Themistian family. It was discovered by Annibale de Gasparis on 5 April 1853. It is named after Themis, the personification of natural law and divine order in Greek mythology.

== Discovery and observations ==
24 Themis was discovered on 5 April 1853 by Annibale de Gasparis of Naples, though it was given its name by fellow Italian astronomer Angelo Secchi. The asteroid was named after Themis, the Greek goddess of law. Gravitational perturbations in the orbit of Themis were used to calculate the mass of Jupiter as early as 1875.

On 24 December 1975, 24 Themis had a close encounter with 2296 Kugultinov with a minimum distance of 0.016 AU (2.4×10^{6} km). By analyzing the perturbation of Kugultinov's orbit due to the gravitational pull of Themis, the mass of Themis was determined to be approximately 2.89×10^{−11} solar masses (9.62×10^{−6} Earth masses).

== Orbit and rotation ==
Themis is in an elliptical orbit around the Sun with an eccentricity of 0.1306 and an inclination of 0.76°. It has an orbital period of 5.54 years. The distance between Themis and the Sun ranges from 2.71 AU at perihelion and 3.55 AU at aphelion, with a mean distance of 3.1302 AU. Themis is part of the Themis family of asteroids, which is located in the outer part of the main belt. The family consists of a core of large objects surrounded by a cloud of smaller objects; 24 Themis is a member of the core.

== Surface materials ==
=== Ice ===
On 7 October 2009, the presence of water ice was confirmed on the surface of this asteroid using NASA’s Infrared Telescope Facility. The surface of the asteroid appears completely covered in ice. As this ice layer is sublimated, it may be getting replenished by a reservoir of ice under the surface.

Scientists hypothesize that some of the first water brought to Earth was delivered by asteroid impacts after the collision that produced the Moon. The presence of ice on 24 Themis supports this theory. Because of its proximity to the Sun, the widespread presence of ice on the surface of 24 Themis is somewhat unexpected. The surface ice may be replenished by a subsurface reservoir of ice or impact gardening—a phenomenon in which impact events overturn surface material at a rate of 1 m/ Gyr (billion years).

An alternative mechanism to explain the presence of water ice on 24 Themis is similar to the hypothesized formation of water on the surface of the Moon by solar wind. Trace amounts of water would be continuously produced by high-energy solar protons impinging oxide minerals present at the surface of the asteroid. The hydroxyl surface groups (S–OH) formed by the collision of protons (H^{+}) with oxygen atoms present at oxide surface (S=O) can further be converted in water molecules (H_{2}O) adsorbed onto the oxide minerals surface. The chemical rearrangement supposed at the oxide surface could be schematically written as follows:

2 S-OH → S=O + S + H_{2}O

or,

2 S-OH → S–O–S + H_{2}O

where S represents the oxide surface.

=== Organics ===
Organic compounds were also detected on the surface of Themis in the form of tholins, high-molecular weight organics found in the outer solar system, distinguished by a brown or reddish color in optical spectra. Compounds found in the spectra of Themis include ice tholin (the residual of an irradiated mixture of water ice and ethane), asphaltite, carbonaceous meteorite material, and polycyclic aromatic hydrocarbons.

== See also ==
- Extraterrestrial liquid water
- 269 Justitia – An exceptionally red asteroid named after Justitia, Themis's Roman counterpart
