= G-type =

G-type may refer to:

- G-type star, a stellar spectral classification
  - G-type giant, a large evolved star of spectral class G
  - G-type main sequence star, a main sequence star of spectral class G
- G-type asteroid, an uncommon kind of asteroid

== See also ==
- G-Type, a Marvel Commics fictional character
