= Annibale de Gasparis =

Italian astronomer (1819–1892)

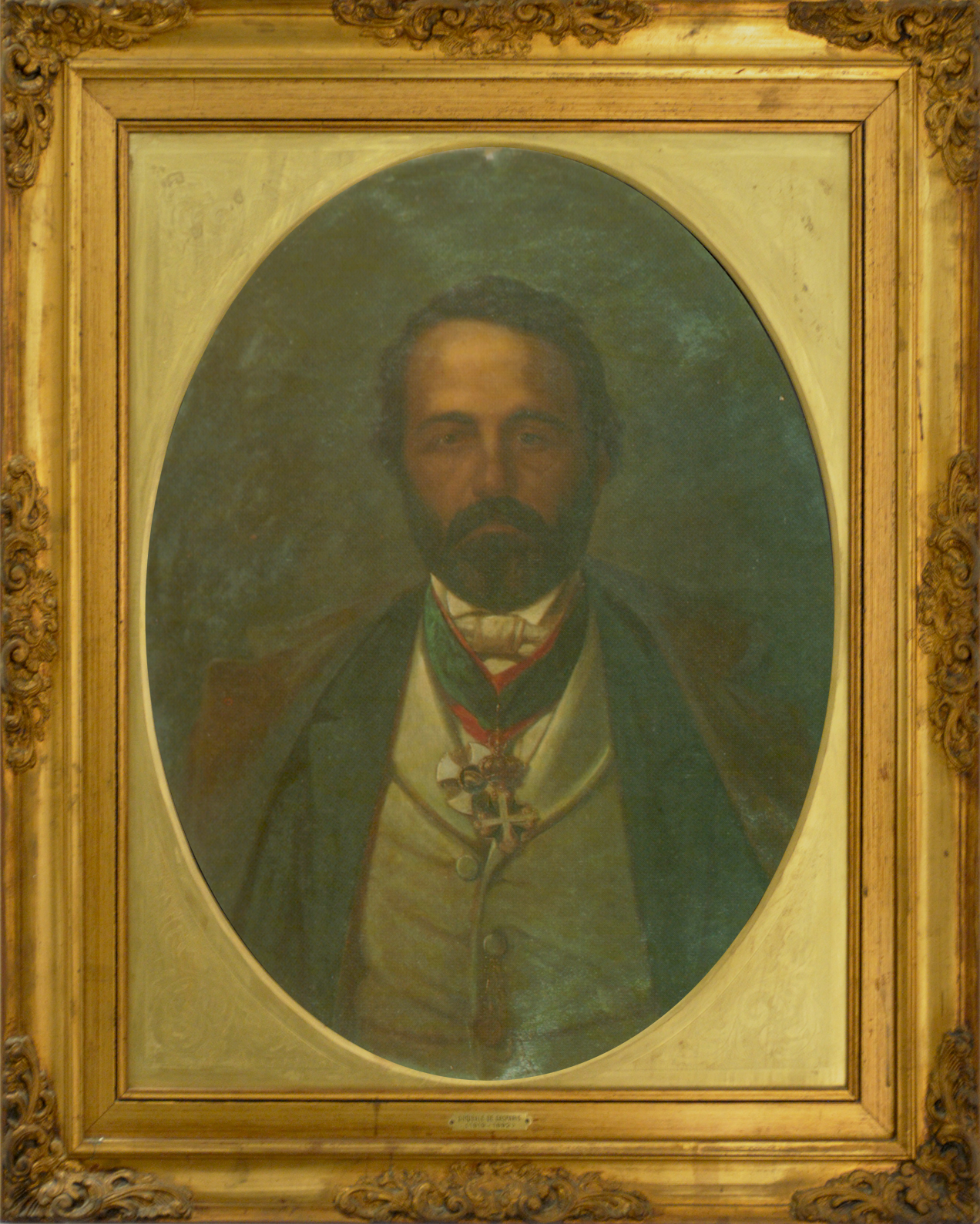
- Annibale de Gasparis
- Born: 9 November 1819; Bugnara, Abruzzo, Kingdom of the Two Sicilies
- Died: 21 March 1892 (aged 72); Naples, Campania, Kingdom of Italy
- Education: University of Naples
- Known for: Discovery of asteroids
- Awards: Lalande Prize (1849–53); Gold Medal of the Royal Astronomical Society (1851)
- Scientific career
- Fields: Mathematics, astronomy, celestial mechanics
- Workplaces: Astronomical Observatory of Capodimonte, University of Naples Federico II

Signature
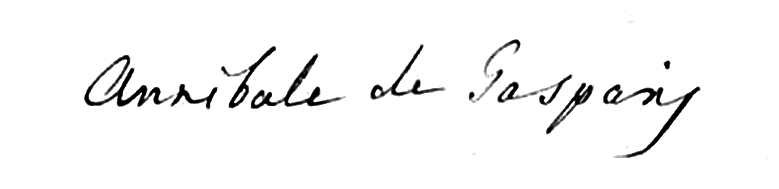

Annibale de Gasparis (Italian pronunciation: [anˈniːbale de ˈɡasparis]; 9 November 1819 – 21 March 1892) was an Italian astronomer, known for discovering asteroids and his contributions to theoretical astronomy.

== Biography ==
De Gasparis was born in 1819 in Bugnara to Angelo de Gasparis and Eleonora Angelantoni originally from Tocco da Casauria. Son of a doctor, he studied in the seminars of Sulmona and Chieti, becoming passionate about classic novels and learning mathematics as a self-taught person. In 1838, he arrived in Naples to study engineering at the School of Bridges and Roads, today's Engineering faculty of Naples University, and the following year he was accepted as a student at the Astronomical Observatory of Capodimonte by the director Ernesto Capocci. He studied mathematics and celestial mechanics and in 1845 he published his first scientific paper on the orbit of the minor planet Vesta. For this studies he earned, as early as 1846, the honorary degree in mathematics by the University of Naples.

In 1848 he participated in the liberal movements, he avoided the Bourbon repression dedicating to the King Ferdinand II his first discovery: the asteroid Hygiea, made on 12 April 1849 with the equatorial telescope of Reichenbach & Utzschneider, giving it the name of Igea Borbonica. In 1850, Capocci was dismissed as director of the observatory due to his participation in the liberal revolts. De Gasparis refused to assume the position of observatory director in deference to his mentor and friend Capocci.

In 1858, he was appointed professor of astronomy at Naples University.

After the death of Capocci, 6 January 1864, he was appointed as director of the Astronomical Observatory of Capodimonte in Naples. Due to his illness, he left the observatory in 1889, going to live in a country house not far from the Observatory.

De Gasparis married Giuseppina Russo in 1848, and they had 9 children together, 3 of whom died in infancy.

De Gasparis published more than 200 scientific papers on mathematics, celestial mechanics, astronomy and meteorology.

He and others occasionally wrote his name as Annibal de Gasparis.

== Discoveries ==
Annibale de Gasparis discovered the following nine asteroids visually. In addition, he also independently discovered 14 Irene, whose discovery was, however, credited to the English astronomer John Russell Hind.

Minor planets discovered: 9
10 Hygiea	12 April 1849
11 Parthenope	11 May 1850
13 Egeria	2 November 1850
15 Eunomia	29 July 1851
16 Psyche	17 March 1852
20 Massalia	19 September 1852
24 Themis	5 April 1853
63 Ausonia	10 February 1861
83 Beatrix	26 April 1865

== Honours and awards ==
He won the Gold Medal of the Royal Astronomical Society in 1851. He was also awarded the Lalande Prize from 1849 to 1853.

On 20 January 1861 he was appointed Senator of the Kingdom of Italy for his high scientific merits.

Recipient of the Order of the Red Eagle, and of the Order of the Rose.

The main-belt asteroid 4279 De Gasparis as well as the 30-kilometer lunar crater de Gasparis and the nearby 93-kilometer long fracture Rimae de Gasparis, are named in his honour.
