= Impact gardening =

Effects of astronomic impacts on crusts of moons and planets

Impact gardening is the process by which impact events stir the outermost crusts of moons and other celestial objects with no atmospheres. In the particular case of the Moon, this is more often known as lunar gardening. Planetary bodies lacking an atmosphere will generally also lack any erosional processes, with the possible exception of volcanism, and as a result impact debris accumulates at the object's surface as a rough "soil," commonly referred to as regolith. Subsequent impacts, especially by micrometeorites, stir and mix this soil. It had long been estimated that the top centimeter of the lunar surface is overturned every 10 million years. However, a 2016 analysis by the LRO satellite of impact ejecta coverage puts the figure closer to 80,000 years.
