= NGC 5792 =

Galaxy in the constellation Libra

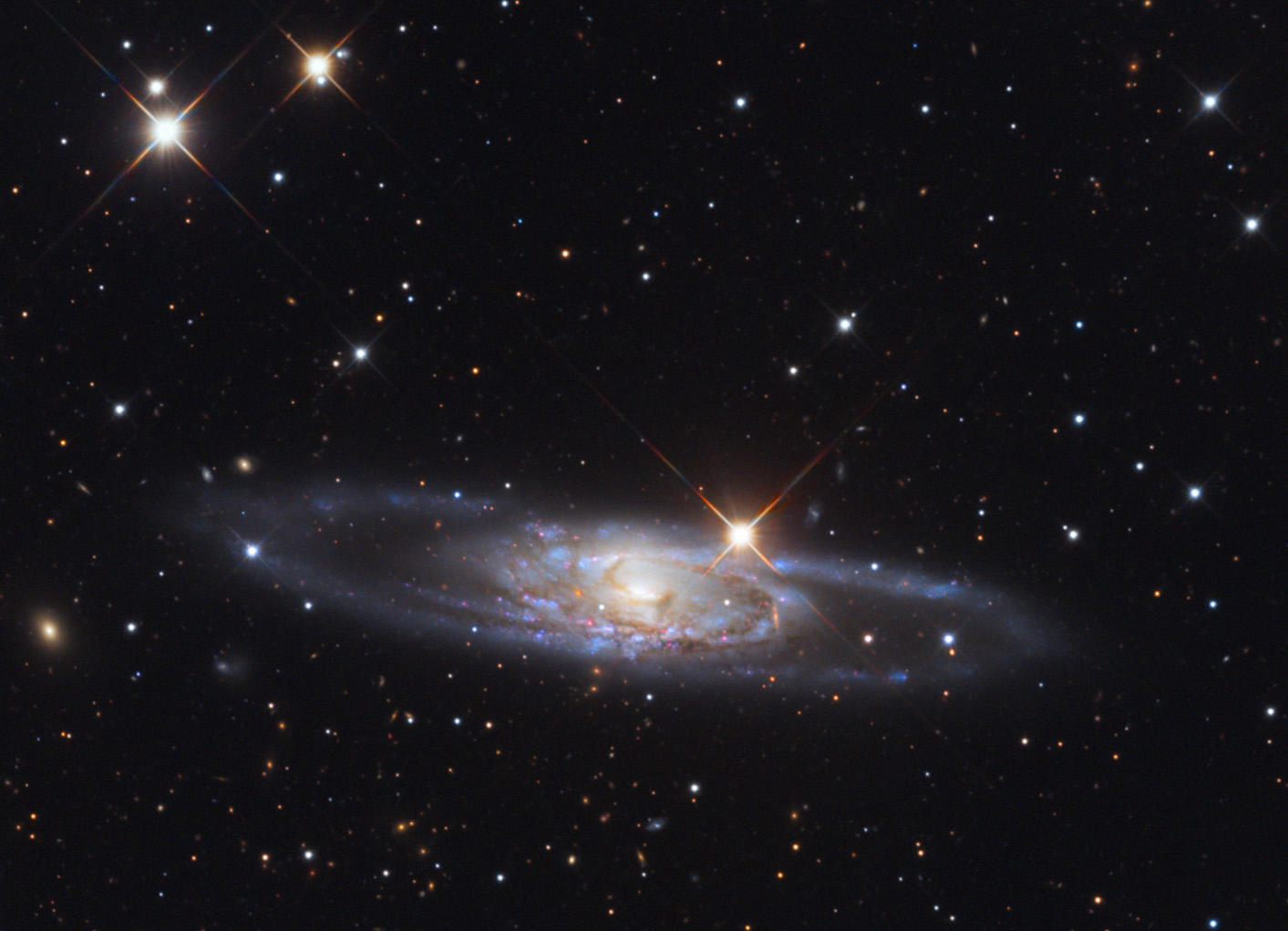
- NGC 5792 (32 inch Schulman Telescope)

Observation data (J2000 epoch)
- Constellation: Libra
- Right ascension: 14^{h} 58^{m} 22.7^{s}
- Declination: −01° 07′ 28″
- Redshift: 0.006411
- Heliocentric radial velocity: 1922 ± 4 km/s
- Distance: 70.27 ± 18.54 Mly (21.545 ± 5.685 Mpc)
- Apparent magnitude (V): 12.1

Characteristics
- Type: SB(rs)b
- Apparent size (V): 6.9′ × 1.7′

Other designations
- UGC 9631, MCG +00-38-012, PGC 53499

NGC 5792 is a barred spiral galaxy about 70 million light-years away in the constellation Libra. There is a magnitude 9.6 star on the northwestern edge of the galaxy. It was discovered on April 11, 1787, by the astronomer William Herschel. It is a member of the Virgo III Groups, a series of galaxies and galaxy clusters strung out to the east of the Virgo Supercluster of galaxies.

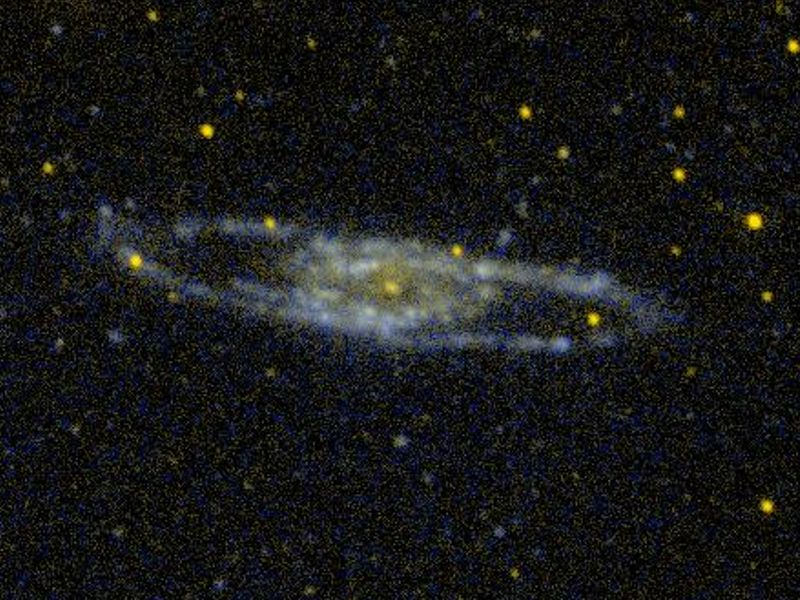
GALEX (ultraviolet)

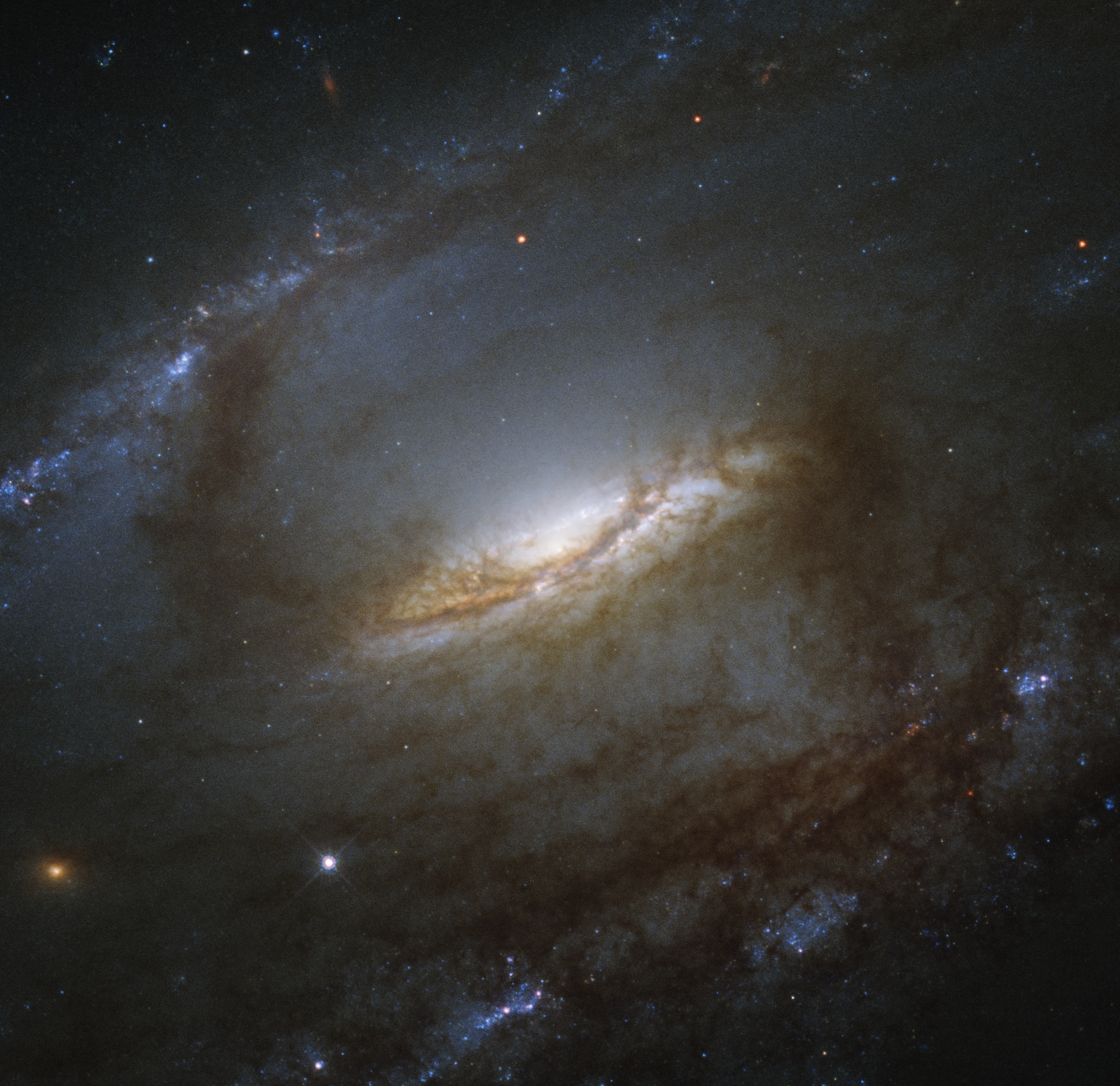
The Core of NGC 5792, Hubble Space Telescope

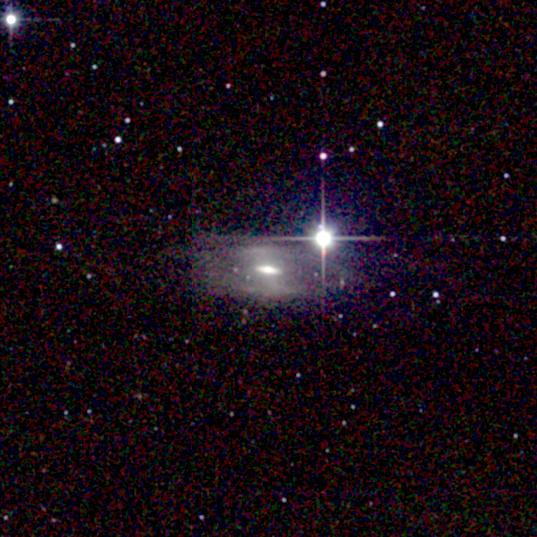
2MASS (near-infrared)

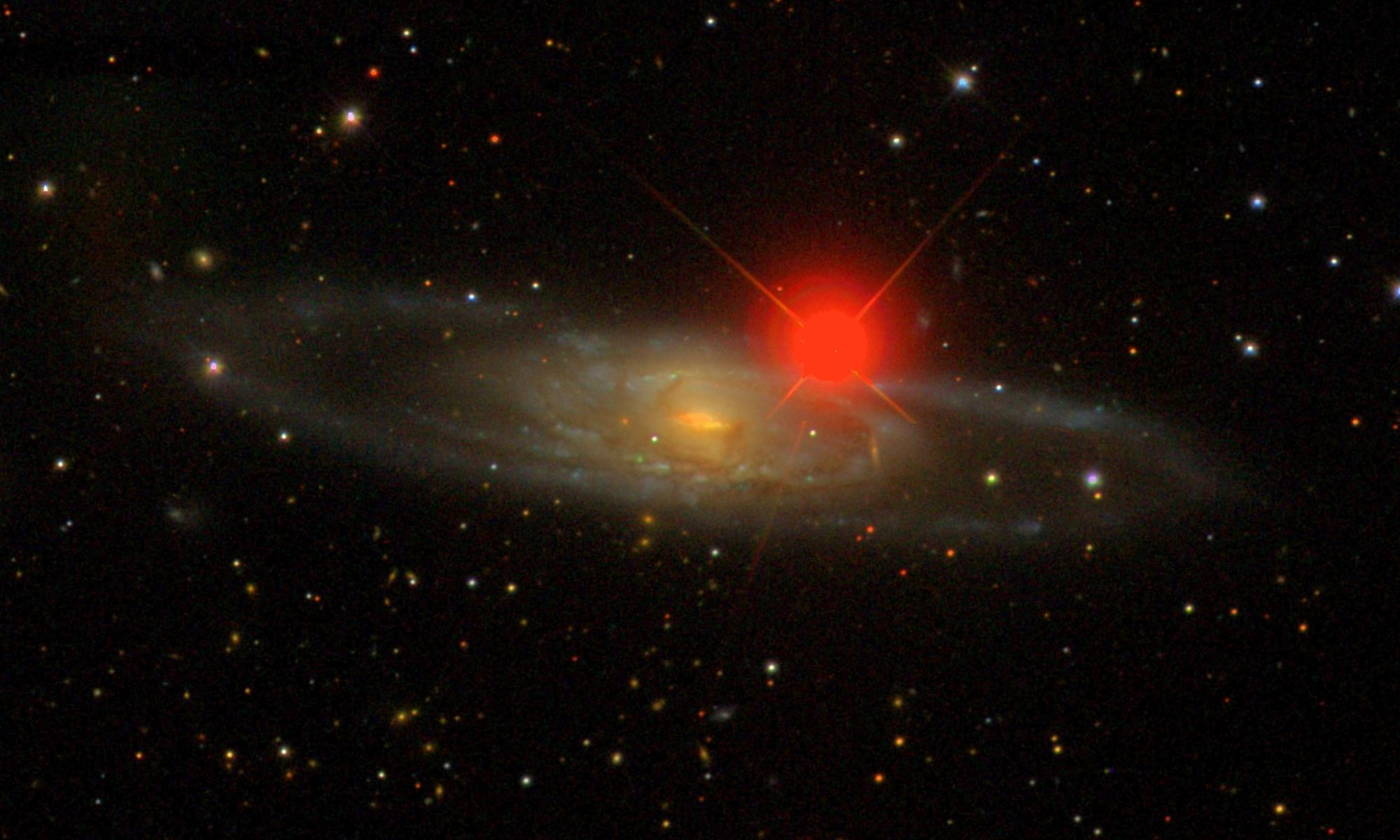
NGC 5792 (SDSS)
