= 11 Parthenope =

Large main-belt asteroid

- Deconvolved VLT-SPHERE image of Parthenope

Discovery
- Discovered by: Annibale de Gasparis
- Discovery site: Naples Obs.
- Discovery date: 11 May 1850

Designations
- Pronunciation: /pɑːrˈθɛnəpi/ par-THEN-ə-pee
- Named after: Parthenopē
- Minor planet category: Main belt
- Adjectives: Parthenopean (/ˌpɑːrθənəˈpiːən/ PARTH-ə-nə-PEE-ən); Parthenopian (/ˌpɑːrθəˈnoʊpiən/ PARTH-ə-NOH-pee-ən)
- Symbol: or (historical)

Orbital characteristics
- Epoch 9 June 2026 (JD 2461200.5)
- Uncertainty parameter 0
- Observation arc: 64124 days (175.56 yr)
- Aphelion: 2.7 AU
- Perihelion: 2.205 AU
- Semi-major axis: 2.452 AU
- Eccentricity: 0.1009
- Orbital period (sidereal): 3.84 yr (1402.6 d)
- Average orbital speed: 19.02 km/s
- Mean anomaly: 224.94°
- Mean motion: 0° 15^{m} 23.342^{s} / day
- Inclination: 4.6362°
- Longitude of ascending node: 125.47°
- Time of perihelion: 2027-Nov-16
- Argument of perihelion: 196.46°
- Earth MOID: 1.19 AU
- Jupiter MOID: 2.54 AU
- T_{Jupiter}: 3.48

Physical characteristics
- Dimensions: (156 × 152 × 138) ± 6 km
- Mean diameter: 149±2 km
- Mass: (5.5±0.4)×10^{18} kg (composite estimate) Individual estimates: (4.85±0.12)×10^{18} kg (Note: Calculated from its standard gravitational parameter GM = 0.324±0.008 km^{3}/s^{2}.); (6.45±0.55)×10^{18} kg
- Mean density: 3.20±0.27 g/cm^{3} Other estimates: 2.81±0.13 g/cm^{3}; 3.72±0.35 g/cm^{3}
- Equatorial surface gravity: 0.0578 m/s^{2}
- Equatorial escape velocity: 0.0941 km/s
- Synodic rotation period: 13.72204±0.00001 h
- Axial tilt: 73°
- Pole ecliptic longitude: 312°±2°
- Pole ecliptic latitude: 17°±4°
- Geometric albedo: 0.187 (calculated); 0.191±0.021
- Temperature: ~174 K
- Spectral type: S-type asteroid
- Apparent magnitude: 8.68 to 12.16
- Absolute magnitude (H): 6.73; 6.55
- Angular diameter: 0.178" to 0.057"

11 Parthenope (also known as A850 JA) is a large, bright asteroid located in the main asteroid belt between the planets of Mars and Jupiter. Parthenope is an S-type asteroid that contains high amounts of silicate material, nickel, and iron.

== History & Discovery ==
Parthenope was discovered by Annibale de Gasparis on 11 May 1850, the second of his nine asteroid discoveries. It was named after Parthenopē, one of the Sirens in Greek mythology, said to have founded the city of Naples. De Gasparis "used his utmost endeavours to realise a 'Parthenope' in the heavens, such being the name suggested by Sir John Herschel on the occasion of the discovery of Hygiea in 1849". Two symbols were proposed for Parthenope: a fish and a star (encoded in Unicode 17.0 as U+1CEC4 𜻄) while such symbols were still in use, and later a lyre (encoded in Unicode 17.0 as U+1F77A 🝺) in lists of symbols. Both are obsolete.

In 1988 a search for satellites or dust orbiting this asteroid was performed using the UH88 telescope at the Mauna Kea Observatories, but the effort came up empty.

== Orbit ==
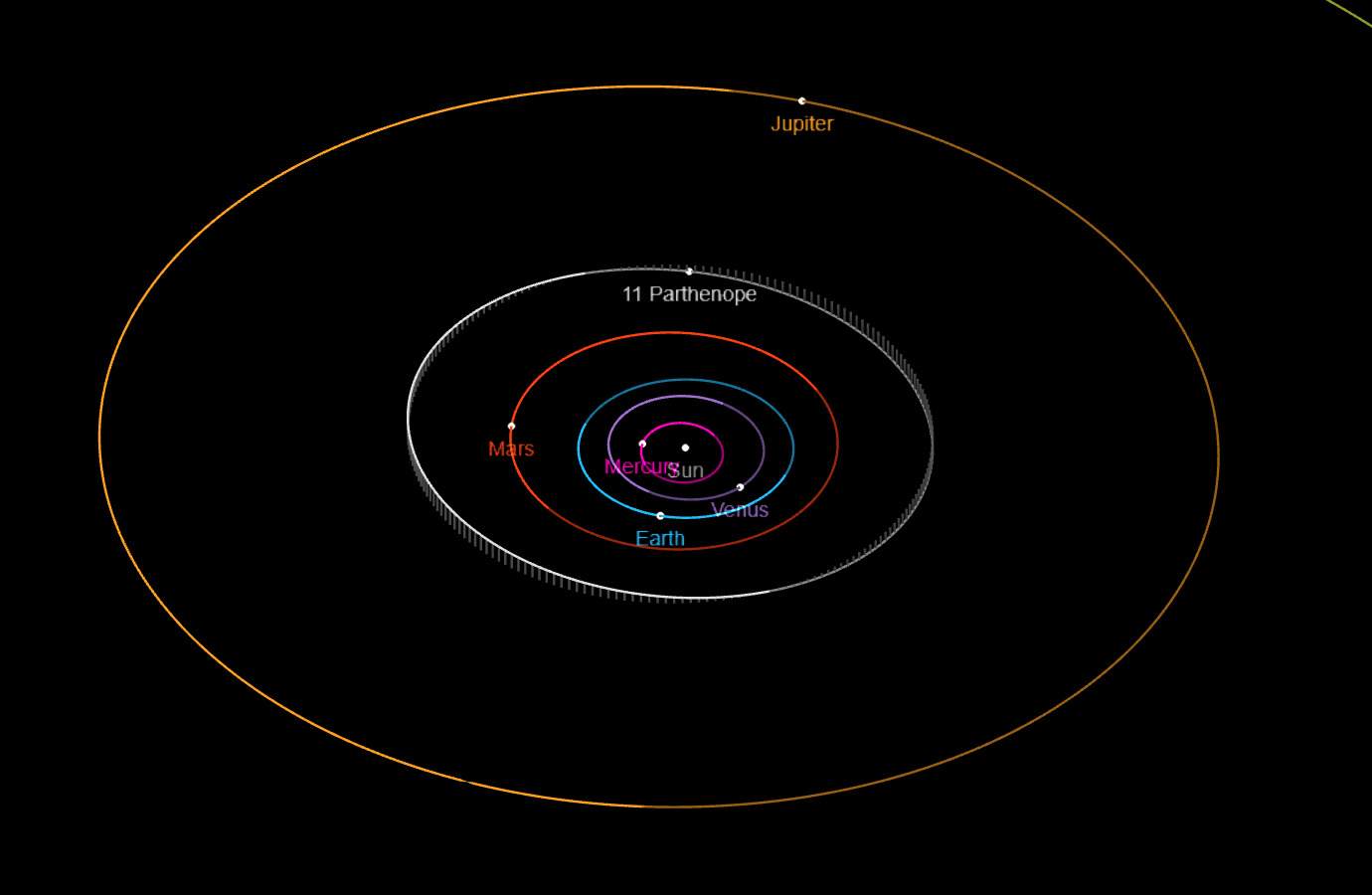
An orbital diagram of 11 Parthenope, with the orbits of the inner planets and Jupiter shown.

Parthenope orbits the Sun at an average distance (its semi-major axis) of 2.5 astronomical units (AU), with an orbital period of 3.8 years. Its distance from the Sun that varies from 2.20 AU at perihelion to 2.7 AU at aphelion, indicated by its orbital eccentricity of 0.1. Parthenope’s orbit is inclined by 4.6° with respect to the ecliptic plane. Parthenope is classified as a background asteroid, as it does not belong to any known asteroid family.

== Physical Characteristics ==
In 2007, Baer and Chesley calculated a higher mass and density for Parthenope based on perturbations by the 90 km asteroid 17 Thetis. Baer and Chesley calculated a mass of 6.3×10^{18} kg with a density of 3.3 g/cm^{3}. 2008 estimates by Baer suggest a mass of 6.15×10^{18} kg. The 1997 and 2001 estimates by Viateau and Rapaport were closer to 5×10^{18} kg with a density of 2.7 g/cm^{3}.

Based upon a light curve that was generated from photometric observations of Parthenope at Pulkovo Observatory, it has a rotation period of 13.722 ± 0.001 hours and varies in brightness by 0.10 ± 0.0s in magnitude. The light curve displays three maxima and minima per cycle. The coloration of the Parthenopean surface is about the average greyish color a typical asteroid would have on their surface area.

== See also ==
- List of former planets
