= C-type asteroid =

Most common asteroid spectral type

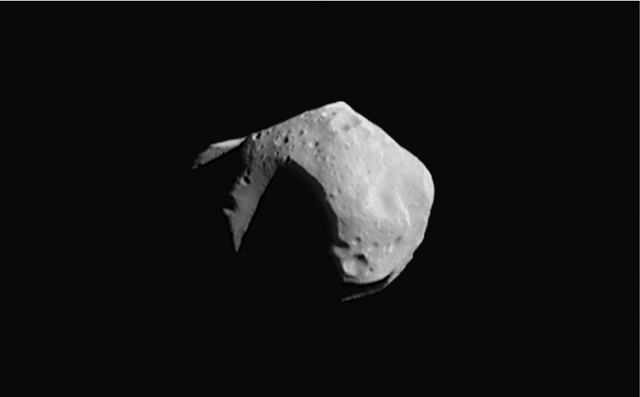
253 Mathilde, a C-type asteroid

C-type (carbonaceous /ˌkɑːrbəˈneɪʃəs/) asteroids are the most common variety, forming around 75% of known asteroids. They are volatile-rich and distinguished by a very low albedo because their composition includes a large amount of carbon, in addition to rocks and minerals. They have an average density of about 1.7 g/cm^{3}. Carbonaceous chondrite meteorites are thought to derive from C-type asteroids.

They lie most often at the outer edge of the asteroid belt, 3.5 au (520 million km; 330 million mi) from the Sun, where 80% of the asteroids are of this type, whereas only 40% of asteroids at 2 au (300 million km; 190 million mi) from the Sun are C-type. The proportion of C-types may actually be greater than this, since C-types are much darker (and hence less detectable) than most other asteroid types, except for D-types and others that lie mostly at the extreme outer edge of the asteroid belt.

== Characteristics ==
Asteroids of this class have spectra very similar to those of carbonaceous chondrite meteorites (types CI and CM). The latter are very close in chemical composition to the Sun and the primitive solar nebula minus hydrogen, helium and other volatiles. Hydrated (water-containing) minerals are present.

C-type asteroids are extremely dark, with albedos typically in the 0.03 to 0.10 range. Consequently, whereas a number of S-type asteroids can normally be viewed with binoculars at opposition, even the largest C-type asteroids require a small telescope. The potentially brightest C-type asteroid is 324 Bamberga, but that object's very high eccentricity means it rarely reaches its maximum magnitude.

Their spectra contain moderately strong ultraviolet absorption at wavelengths below about 0.4 μm to 0.5 μm, while at longer wavelengths they are largely featureless but slightly reddish. The so-called "water" absorption feature of around 3 μm, which can be an indication of water content in minerals, is also present.

Due to their volatile-rich (icy) composition, C-type asteroids have relatively low density. A survey of 20 C-type asteroids found an average density of 1.7 g/cm^{3}.

The largest unequivocally C-type asteroid is 10 Hygiea, although the SMASS classification places the largest asteroid, 1 Ceres, here as well, because that scheme lacks a G-type.

== C-group classifications ==
=== C-group (Tholen) ===
In the Tholen classification, the C-type is grouped along with three less numerous types into a wider C-group of carbonaceous asteroids which contains:

- B-type
- C-type
- F-type
- G-type

=== C-group (SMASS) ===
In the SMASS classification, the wider C-group contains the types:

- B-type corresponding to the Tholen B and F-types
- a core C-type for asteroids having the most "typical" spectra in the group
- Cg and Cgh types corresponding to the Tholen G-type
- Ch type with an absorption feature around 0.7μm
- Cb type corresponding to transition objects between the SMASS C and B types

== See also ==
- Asteroid spectral types
