= G-type asteroid =

Type of asteroid

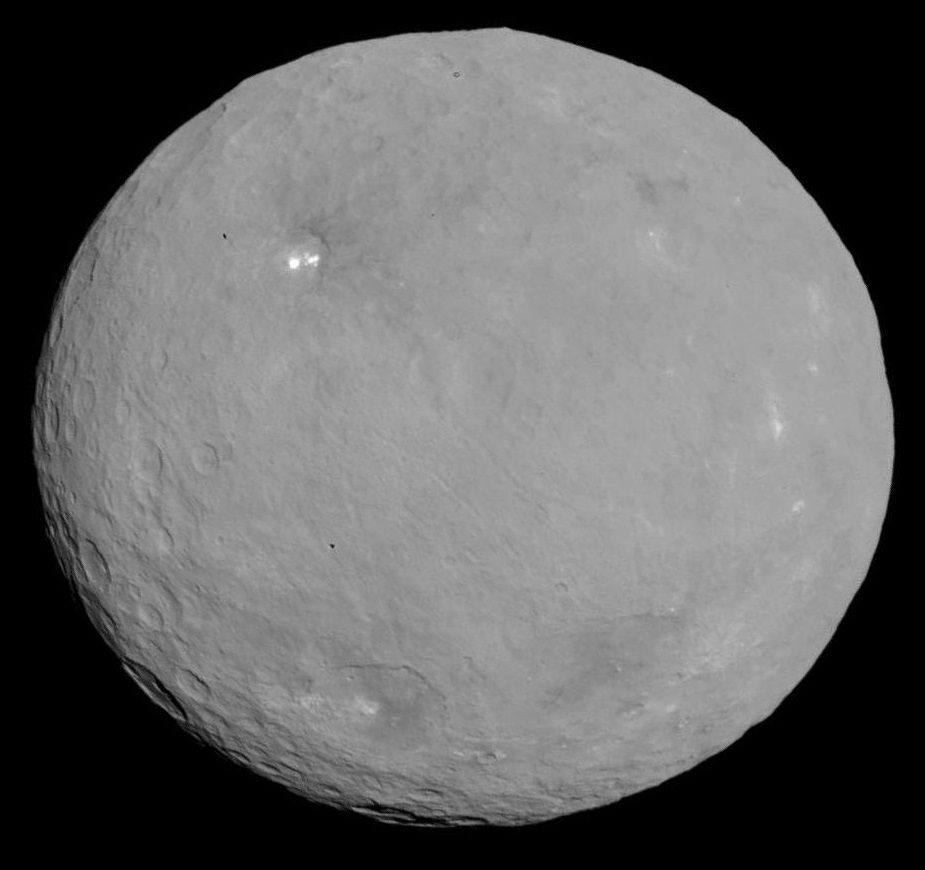
Ceres, the largest asteroid, is a G-type

G-type asteroids are a relatively uncommon type of carbonaceous asteroid that makes up approximately 5% of asteroids. The most notable asteroid in this class is 1 Ceres.

== Characteristics ==
Generally similar to the C-type objects, but contain a strong ultraviolet absorption feature below 0.5 μm. An absorption feature around 0.7 μm may also be present, which is indicative of phyllosilicate minerals such as clays or mica.

In the SMASS classification the G-type corresponds to the Cgh and Cg types, depending on the presence or absence (respectively) of the absorption feature at 0.7 μm. The G-type, C-type and some rare types are sometimes collected together into a wider C-group of carbonaceous asteroids.

== See also ==
- Asteroid spectral types
