= List of Jupiter-crossing minor planets =

A Jupiter-crosser is a minor planet whose orbit crosses that of Jupiter. Jupiter trojans can be inner grazers (105), outer grazers (52), co-orbitals (183), and crossers (537; all counts as of 2004). Discounting them, there is one numbered, 7 non-numbered, and 19 cometary outer-grazers as of 2012. For the Jupiter trojans, see List of Jupiter trojans (Greek camp) and List of Jupiter trojans (Trojan camp).

== Members ==
=== Inner grazers ===
The following is a list of named asteroids that are not Jupiter trojans with a<4.950429, 4.950429<Q<5.458104.

Numerical designation	Name	Semimajor axis (a)	Perihelion (q)	Aphelion (Q)	Inclination (i)	T_{Jup}
1941	Wild	3.9576687	2.8123327	5.1030047	3.9576688	2.980
2483	Guinevere	3.9660605	2.8648120	5.0673089	4.5018307	2.984
2959	Scholl	3.9639072	2.8845027	5.0433117	5.2266660	2.985
3415	Danby	3.9758047	2.9821889	4.9694204	1.3720066	3.001
4446	Carolyn	3.9847309	2.8654604	5.1040014	7.2437749	2.972
5370	Taranis	3.3201194	1.2050313	5.4352075	19.1663375	2.730
8373	Stephengould	3.2793924	1.4599527	5.0988320	40.7988751	2.587
8550	Hesiodos	3.9469702	2.9183717	4.9755688	2.8770596	2.998
9767	Midsomor Norton	3.3876184	1.4614187	5.3138182	21.4765793	2.771
10608	Mameta	3.9970925	2.9733157	5.0208692	4.5213778	2.991
12896	Geoffroy	3.9656152	2.8304429	5.1007875	6.3396988	2.975
15231	Ehdita	3.9420298	2.7859763	5.0980833	6.8145092	2.972
15376	Marták	3.9405888	2.7198112	5.1613665	2.898672	2.973
15783	Briancox	3.9533527	2.9347246	4.9719808	4.8458548	2.995
20038	Arasaki	3.9885244	3.0254297	4.9516191	19.5588206	2.906
21804	Václavneumann	3.9358785	2.8792005	4.9925564	3.8389635	2.994
61042	Noviello	3.9821252	2.9119354	5.0523150	9.5445462	2.969
73769	Delphi	3.9821229	2.9425211	5.0217246	1.9002573	2.995
84011	Jean-Claude	4.0101019	3.0215759	4.9986279	4.0124416	2.995
99862	Kenlevin	3.9505605	2.9191583	4.9819627	10.0886018	2.973
100231	Monceau	3.9574767	2.7911890	5.1237644	2.7823358	2.980
113415	Rauracia	3.9888370	2.9525987	5.0250753	11.1590108	2.963
117993	Zambujal	4.0204050	2.9487023	5.0921078	1.8573524	2.988
134039	Stephaniebarnes	3.9789971	2.9130231	5.0449711	9.6741502	2.969
154932	Sviderskiene	3.9711154	2.9828014	4.9594295	1.6191862	3.002
169509	Jeffreyrobbins	3.9613248	2.9490573	4.9735923	3.3283949	2.998
173108	Ingola	3.9583783	2.6575983	5.2591584	0.7598889	2.962
249302	Ajoie	3.9292547	2.7432650	5.1152443	5.6092116	2.973
274810	Fedaksari	3.9729175	2.9783448	4.9674901	4.0803365	2.997
355256	Margarethekahn	3.3488186	1.2396506	5.4579865	12.5210232	2.770
402920	Tsawout	3.9350116	2.8614202	5.0086031	12.1172083	2.958
441563	Domanski	4.0043076	3.05485	4.9537651	2.7927451	3.002
450806	Mariamalibran	3.9696566	2.8294942	5.1098189	14.1691962	2.933
706882	Hertagessner	4.0002957	3.0231523	4.9774391	13.4134106	2.955

=== Outer grazers ===
Similar to inner grazers, these orbit with a semi-major axis greater than Jupiter, but still have a perihelion distance within Jupiter's perihelion and aphelion, a>5.458104 and 4.950429<q<5.458104.

Provisional designation	Number	Semimajor axis (a)	Perihelion (q)	Aphelion (Q)	Inclination (i)	T_{Jup}
2008 QD_{4}	315898	8.42410	5.450462	11.39774	42.01641	2.387
2000 GQ_{148}	461363	6.415034	5.10450	7.72557	15.81763	2.903
2004 CM111		33	5.00	60	4.67	2.814
2005 VD	434620	6.66224	4.98632	8.33816	172.8655	-1.392
2008 HY21		10.9163	5.38371	16.4489	11.99664	2.919
2010 GW147		174.8	5.38093	344.2	99.62267	-0.447
2010 XZ78	523649	7.6617	5.39009	9.9333	39.2351	2.474
2011 WR74		9.00	5.19	12.82	10.899	2.917
2013 CJ118		10	5.2	16	10	2.914
2013 EK_{73}	437313	13.0189	5.39096	20.647	8.98504	2.932
2013 FU61		9.21	5.35	13.06	19.55	2.842
2014 RE12	750120	14.31	5.082	23.53	31.55	2.524

=== Jupiter crossers ===
These are asteroids that cross the orbit of Jupiter in any sort of way, defined simply as having a perihelion less than that of Jupiter's perihelion, and an aphelion greater than Jupiter's aphelion.

Number	Name/Designation	Semimajor axis (a)	Perihelion (q)	Aphelion (Q)	Inclination (i)	T_{Jup}
944	Hidalgo	5.73650908	1.9415260	9.5315921	42.52454	2.068
3552	Don Quixote	4.22198210	1.2099156	7.23404861	31.029816	2.314
5164	Mullo	3.69327190	1.8504846	5.53605921	19.278250	2.787
5335	Damocles	11.831	1.57294	22.090	62.0845	1.143
6144	Kondojiro	4.75035383	3.0319800	6.4687276	5.887297	2.868
15504	1999 RG_{33}	9.3964	2.149710	16.6431	34.9021	1.957
18916	2000 OG_{44}	3.84737395	1.5936645	6.10108342	7.41703	2.735
20461	Dioretsa	23.776	2.390026	45.162	160.40358	-1.541
20898	Fountainhills	4.22660409	2.26088477	6.1923234	45.52005	2.349
32511	2001 NX_{17}	5.0369831	2.8877697	7.1861964	8.932579	2.791
37117	Narcissus	6.873395	3.06464	10.682154	13.81436	2.615
65407	2002 RP_{120}	54.888	2.483516	107.292	119.10563	-0.845
85490	1997 SE_{5}	3.70679069	1.2225315	6.1910499	2.599906	2.655
144908	2004 YH_{32}	8.1620	3.548172	12.7757	79.09398	1.028
145485	2005 UN_{398}	4.5991409	2.2133475	6.9849344	11.550620	2.706
145627	2006 RY_{102}	6.348164	4.5909472	8.105381	18.699958	2.830
154784	2004 PA_{44}	14.2313	3.451766	25.0108	3.27983	2.522
187799	1999 FK_{16}	4.2757264	3.050283	5.5011694	17.36476	2.875

== Jupiter Crossers ==
The numbered Jupiter-crossers are (incomplete):

Note: † denotes inner-grazer (aphelia outside Jupiter's perihelion and within its aphelion) (from)

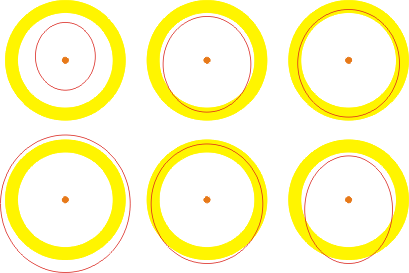
Inner-grazer: middle, top; Outer-grazer: middle, bottom; Crosser: right, bottom; Co-orbital: right, top

- 944 Hidalgo
- 1941 Wild †
- 2483 Guinevere †
- 2959 Scholl †
- 3415 Danby †
- 3552 Don Quixote
- 4446 Carolyn †
- 5164 Mullo
- 5335 Damocles
- 5370 Taranis † (2:1 resonance)
- 6144 Kondojiro
- 8373 Stephengould †
- 8550 Hesiodos †
- 9767 Midsomer Norton †
- 10608 Mameta †
- (12307) 1991 UA †
- 12896 Geoffroy †
- (14569) 1998 QB32 †
- 15231 Ehdita †
- 15376 Marták †
- (15504) 1999 RG33
- 15783 Briancox †
- (17212) 2000 AV183 †
- (18916) 2000 OG44
- 20038 Arasaki †
- (20086) 1994 LW †
- 20461 Dioretsa
- (20630) 1999 TJ90 †
- 20898 Fountainhills
- 21804 Václavneumann †
- (21930) 1999 VP61 †
- (22070) 2000 AN106 †
- 22647 Levi-Strauss †
- (23174) 2000 HM40 †
- (26166) 1995 QN3 †
- (26929) 1997 CE18 †
- (30512) 2001 HO8 †
- (32460) 2000 SY92 †
- (32511) 2001 NX17
- 37117 Narcissus
- (37578) 1990 RY2 †
- (37590) 1991 RA14 †
- (38292) 1999 RA77 †
- (38709) 2000 QO90 †
- (39266) 2001 AT2 †
- (45739) 2000 HR25 †
- (47907) 2000 GT71 †
- (51284) 2000 KE9 †
- (51838) 2001 OC61 †
- (52007) 2002 EQ47 †
- (52016) 2002 NO18 †
- (52068) 2002 QX40 †
- (61042) 2000 KB61 †
- (65374) 2002 PP55 †
- (65389) 2002 RF12 †
- (65407) 2002 RP120
- (67368) 2000 LH33 †
- (69566) 1998 BX †
- (73418) 2002 LK36 †
- (73457) 2002 NZ43 †
- (73769) 1994 PN12 †
- (78133) 2002 NQ13 †
- (78470) 2002 RM45 †
- (78809) 2003 OR22 †
- (79724) 1998 SC125 †
- 84011 Jean-Claude †
- (87704) 2000 SG23 †
- (92326) 2000 GS53 †
- (95952) 2003 QP12 †
- (96177) 1984 BC †
- 99862 Kenlevin †
- (394130) 2006 HY51 †

== See also ==
- List of Mercury-crossing minor planets
- List of Venus-crossing minor planets
- List of Earth-crossing minor planets
- List of Mars-crossing minor planets
