= List of minor-planet groups =

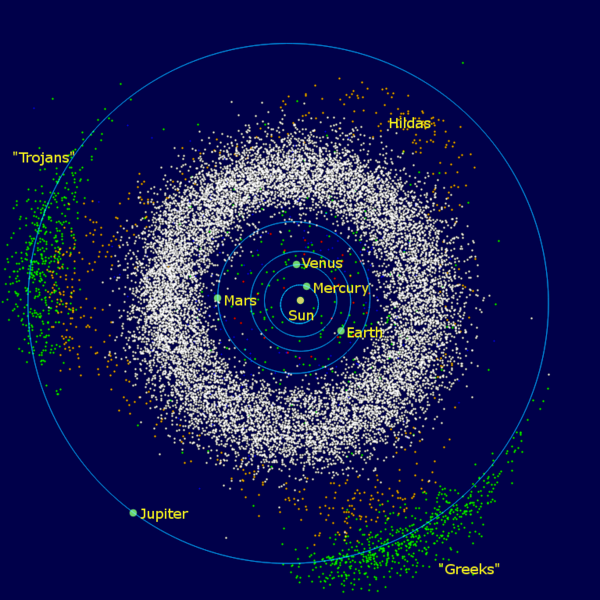

A minor-planet group is a population of minor planets that share broadly similar orbits. Members are generally unrelated to each other, unlike in an asteroid family, which often results from the break-up of a single asteroid. It is customary to name a group of asteroids after the first member of that group to be discovered, which is often the largest.

== Groups out to the orbit of Earth ==
There are relatively few asteroids that orbit close to the Sun. Several of these groups are hypothetical at this point in time, with no members having yet been discovered; as such, the names they have been given are provisional.

- Vulcanoid asteroids are hypothetical asteroids that orbit entirely within the orbit of Mercury (have an aphelion of less than 0.3874 AU). A few searches for vulcanoids have been conducted but none have been discovered so far.
- ꞌAylóꞌchaxnim asteroids (previously named Vatira) are asteroids that orbit entirely within the orbit of Venus (have an aphelion of less than 0.718 AU). As of 2022, one such asteroid is known: 594913 ꞌAylóꞌchaxnim.
- Atira asteroids (Apohele; Interior-Earth Objects) are a small group of known asteroids whose aphelion is less than 0.983 AU, meaning they orbit entirely within Earth's orbit. The group is named after its first confirmed member, 163693 Atira. As of July 2025, the group consists of 36 members, two of which are named and nine of which are numbered.
- Mercury-crosser asteroids having a perihelion smaller than Mercury's 0.3075 AU.
- Venus-crosser asteroids having a perihelion smaller than Venus's 0.7184 AU. This group includes the above Mercury-crossers (if their aphelion is greater than Venus's perihelion. All known Mercury crossers satisfy this condition except ꞌAylóꞌchaxnim, which has an aphelion smaller than Venus's perihelion and a perihelion slightly smaller than Mercury's aphelion).
- Earth-crosser asteroids having a perihelion smaller than Earth's 0.9833 AU. This group includes the above Mercury- and Venus-crossers, apart from the Apoheles. They are also divided into the
  - Aten asteroids having a semi-major axis less than 1 AU, named after 2062 Aten.
  - Apollo asteroids having a semi-major axis greater than 1 AU, named after 1862 Apollo.
- Arjuna asteroids are somewhat vaguely defined as having orbits similar to Earth's; i.e. with an average orbital radius of around 1 AU and with low eccentricity and inclination. Due to the vagueness of this definition some asteroids belonging to the Atira, Amor, Apollo or Aten groups can also be classified as Arjunas. The term was introduced by Spacewatch and does not refer to an existing asteroid; examples of Arjunas include 1991 VG.
- Earth trojans are asteroids located in the Earth–Sun Lagrangian points L_{4} and L_{5}. Their location in the sky as observed from Earth's surface would be fixed at about 60 degrees east and west of the Sun, and as people tend to search for asteroids at much greater elongations few searches have been done in these locations. The only known Earth trojans are 2010 TK7 and 2020 XL5.
- Near-Earth asteroids is a catch-all term for asteroids whose orbit closely approaches that of Earth. It includes almost all of the above groups, as well as the Amor asteroids.

== Groups out to the orbit of Mars ==
- The Amor asteroids, named after 1221 Amor, are near-Earth asteroids that are not Earth-crossers, having a perihelion just outside the Earth's orbit.
- Mars-crosser asteroids have orbits that cross that of Mars, but do not necessarily closely approach the Earth's.
- Mars trojans follow or lead Mars on its orbit, at either of the two Lagrangian points 60° ahead (L_{4}) or behind (L_{5}). As of November 2020, nine are known. The largest appears to be 5261 Eureka.
- Many of the Earth-, Venus-, and Mercury-crosser asteroids have aphelia greater than 1 AU.

== The asteroid belt ==
Histogram showing the four most prominent Kirkwood gaps and a possible division into inner, middle and outer main-belt asteroids: inner main-belt (a < 2.5 AU) middle main-belt (2.5 AU < a < 2.82 AU) outer main-belt (a > 2.82 AU

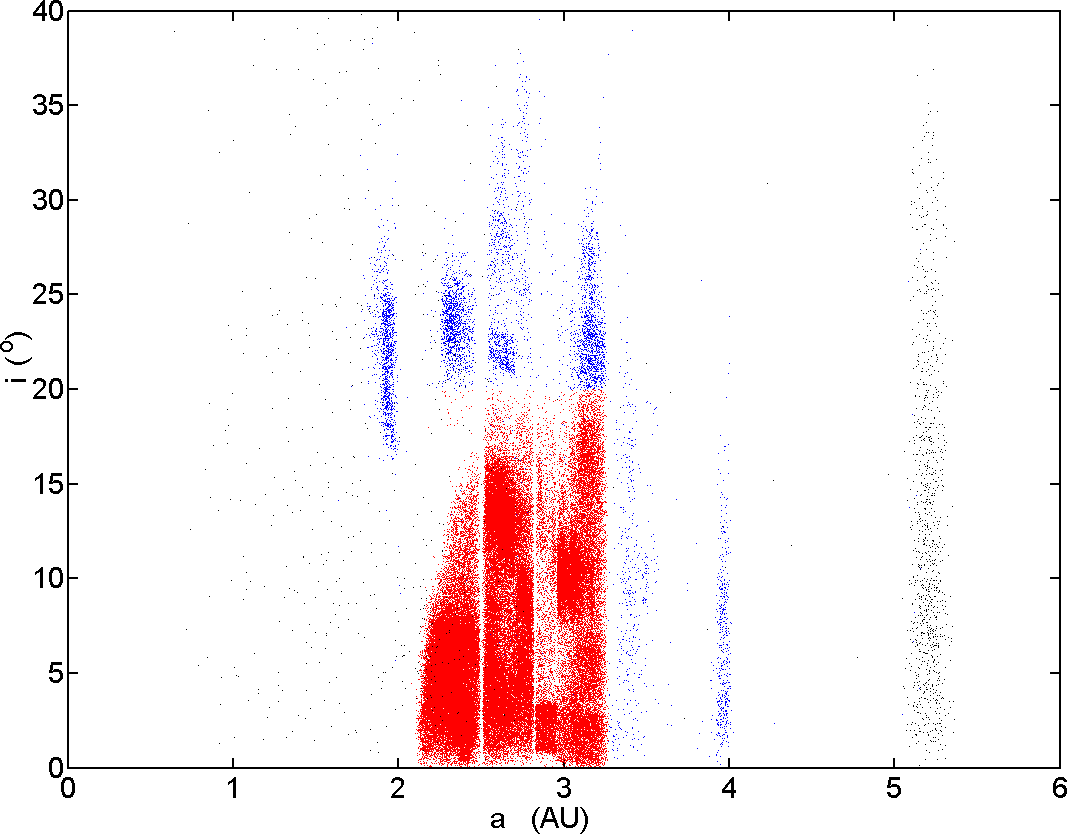
Asteroid groups out to the orbit of Jupiter. The asteroid belt is shown in red

The overwhelming majority of known asteroids have orbits lying between the orbits of Mars and Jupiter, roughly between 2 and 4 AU. These could not form a planet due to the gravitational influence of Jupiter. Jupiter's gravitational influence, through orbital resonance, clears Kirkwood gaps in the asteroid belt, first recognised by Daniel Kirkwood in 1874.

The region with the densest concentration (lying between the Kirkwood gaps at 2.06 and 3.27 AU, with eccentricities below about 0.3, and inclinations smaller than 30°) is called the asteroid belt. It can be further subdivided by the Kirkwood Gaps into the:

- Inner asteroid belt, inside of the strong Kirkwood gap at 2.50 AU due to the 3:1 Jupiter orbital resonance. The largest member is 4 Vesta.
  - It apparently also includes a group called the main-belt I asteroids which have a semi-major axis between 2.3 AU and 2.5 AU and an inclination of less than 18°.
- Middle (or intermediate) asteroid belt, between the 3:1 and 5:2 Jupiter orbital resonances, the latter at 2.82 AU. The largest member is Ceres. This group is apparently split into the:
  - Main-belt IIa asteroids which have a semi-major axis between 2.5 AU and 2.706 AU and an inclination less than 33°.
  - Main-belt IIb asteroids which have a semi-major axis between 2.706 AU and 2.82 AU and an inclination less than 33°.
- Outer asteroid belt between the 5:2 and 2:1 Jupiter orbital resonances. The largest member is 10 Hygiea. This group is apparently split into the:
  - Main-belt IIIa asteroids which have a semi-major axis between 2.82 AU and 3.03 AU, an eccentricity less than .35, and an inclination less than 30°.
  - Main-belt IIIb asteroids which have a semi-major axis between 3.03 AU and 3.27 AU, an eccentricity less than .35, and an inclination less than 30°.

=== Other groups out to the orbit of Jupiter ===
There are a number of more or less distinct asteroid groups outside the asteroid belt, distinguished either by mean distance from the Sun, or particular combinations of several orbital elements:

- The Hungaria asteroids, with a mean orbital radius between 1.78 AU and 2 AU, an eccentricity less than 0.18, and inclination between 16° and 34°. Named after 434 Hungaria, these are just outside Mars's orbit, and are possibly attracted by the 9:2 Jupiter resonance or the 3:2 Mars resonance.
- The Phocaea asteroids, with a mean orbital radius between 2.25 AU and 2.5 AU, an eccentricity greater than 0.1, and inclination between 18° and 32°. Some sources group the Phocaeas asteroids with the Hungarias, but the division between the two groups is real and caused by the 4:1 resonance with Jupiter. Named after 25 Phocaea.
- The Alinda asteroids have a mean orbital radius of 2.5 AU and an eccentricity between 0.4 and 0.65 (approximately). These objects are held by the 3:1 resonance with Jupiter and a 4:1 resonance with Earth. Many Alinda asteroids have perihelia very close to Earth's orbit and can be difficult to observe for this reason. Alinda asteroids are not in stable orbits and eventually will collide either with Jupiter or terrestrial planets. Named after 887 Alinda.
- The Pallas family asteroids have a mean orbital radius between 2.7 and 2.8 AU and an inclination between 30° and 38°. Named after 2 Pallas.
- The Griqua asteroids have an orbital radius between 3.1 AU and 3.27 AU and an eccentricity greater than 0.35. These asteroids are in stable 2:1 libration with Jupiter, in high-inclination orbits. There are about 5 to 10 of these known so far, with 1362 Griqua and 8373 Stephengould the most prominent.
- The Cybele asteroids have a mean orbital radius between 3.27 AU and 3.7 AU, an eccentricity less than 0.3, and an inclination less than 30°. Named after 65 Cybele.
- Hilda asteroids have a mean orbital radius between 3.7 AU and 4.2 AU, an eccentricity greater than 0.07, and an inclination less than 20°. These asteroids are in a 3:2 resonance with Jupiter. Named after 153 Hilda.
- The Thule asteroids are in a 4:3 resonance with Jupiter and the group is known to consist of 279 Thule, (186024) 2001 QG207, and (185290) 2006 UB219.
- The Jupiter trojans have a mean orbital radius between 5.05 AU and 5.4 AU, and lie in elongated, curved regions around the two Lagrangian points 60° ahead and behind of Jupiter. The leading point, L_{4}, is called the Greek camp and the trailing L_{5} point is called the Trojan camp, after the two opposing camps of the legendary Trojan War; with one exception apiece, objects in each node are named for members of that side of the conflict. 617 Patroclus in the Trojan camp and 624 Hektor in the Greek camp are "misplaced" in the enemy camps.

There is a forbidden zone between the Hildas and the Trojans (roughly 4.05 AU to 4.94 AU). Aside from 279 Thule and 228 objects (though likely more) in mostly unstable-looking orbits, Jupiter's gravity has swept everything out of this region.

There are some objects in these areas that are currently not able to be classified conventionally. Some examples of which are 514107 Kaʻepaokaʻāwela, a retrograde co-orbital of Jupiter, and 6144 Kondojiro.

== Groups beyond the orbit of Jupiter ==
Most of the minor planets beyond the orbit of Jupiter are believed to be composed of ices and other volatiles. Many are similar to comets, differing only in that the perihelia of their orbits are too distant from the Sun to produce a significant tail.

- The Damocloid asteroids, also known as the "Oort cloud group," are named after 5335 Damocles. They are defined to be objects that have "fallen in" from the Oort cloud, so their aphelia are generally still out past Uranus, but their perihelia are in the inner Solar System. They have high eccentricities and sometimes high inclinations, including retrograde orbits. The definition of this group is somewhat fuzzy, and may overlap significantly with comets.
- The Centaurs have a mean orbital radius roughly between 5.4 AU and 30 AU. They are currently believed to be trans-Neptunian objects that "fell in" after encounters with gas giants. The first of these to be identified was 2060 Chiron (944 Hidalgo was discovered before, but not identified as a distinct orbital class).

== Groups at or beyond the orbit of Neptune ==
- The Neptune trojans as of February 2020 consist of 29 objects. The first one to be discovered was 2001 QR322.
- Trans-Neptunian objects (TNOs) are anything with a mean orbital radius greater than 30 AU. This classification includes the Kuiper-belt objects (KBOs), the scattered disc, and the Oort cloud.
  - Kuiper-belt objects extend from roughly 30 AU to 50 AU and are broken into the following subcategories:
    - Resonant objects occupy orbital resonances with Neptune, excluding the 1:1 resonance of the Neptune trojans.
      - Plutinos are by far the most common resonant KBOs and are in a 2:3 resonance with Neptune, just like Pluto. The perihelion of such an object tends to be close to Neptune's orbit (much as happens with Pluto), but when the object comes to perihelion, Neptune alternates between being 90 degrees ahead of and 90 degrees behind of the object, so there's no chance of a collision. The MPC defines any object with a mean orbital radius between 39 AU and 40.5 AU to be a plutino. 90482 Orcus and 28978 Ixion are among the brightest known.
      - Other resonances. There are several known objects in the 1:2 resonance, dubbed twotinos, with a mean orbital radius of 47.7 AU and an eccentricity of 0.37. There are several objects in the 2:5 (mean orbital radius of 55 AU), 4:7, 4:5, 3:10, 3:5, and 3:4 resonances, among others. The largest in the 2:5 resonance is (84522) 2002 TC302, and the largest in the 3:10 resonance is 225088 Gonggong.
    - Classical Kuiper-belt objects, also known as cubewanos (after 15760 Albion, which had the provisional designation 1992 QB_{1} between its discovery in 1992 and its formal naming in 2018), have a mean orbital radius between approximately 40.5 AU and 47 AU. Cubewanos are objects in the Kuiper belt that didn't get scattered and didn't get locked into a resonance with Neptune. The largest is Makemake.
  - Scattered disc objects (SDOs) typically have, unlike cubewanos and resonant objects, high-inclination, high-eccentricity orbits with perihelia that are still not too far from Neptune's orbit. They are assumed to be objects that encountered Neptune and were "scattered" out of their originally more circular orbits close to the ecliptic. The most massive known dwarf planet, Eris, belongs to this category.
    - Detached objects (extended scattered disk) with generally highly elliptical, very large orbits of up to a few hundred AU and a perihelion too far from Neptune's orbit for any significant interaction to occur. A more typical member of the extended disk is (148209) 2000 CR105.
      - Sednoids have perihelia very far removed from the orbit of Neptune. This group is named after the best-known member, 90377 Sedna. As of 2020, only 4 objects in this category have been identified, but it is suspected that there are many more.
  - The Oort cloud is a hypothetical cloud of comets with a mean orbital radius between approximately 50,000 AU and 100,000 AU. No Oort-cloud objects have been detected; the existence of this classification is only inferred from indirect evidence. Some astronomers have tentatively associated 90377 Sedna with the inner Oort cloud.

== See also ==
- Dwarf planet
- List of minor planets § Category
- Minor Planet Center
- Mesoplanet
