= 6144 Kondojiro =

Jupiter-crossing asteroid

Discovery
- Discovered by: K. Endate, K. Watanabe
- Discovery site: Kitami
- Discovery date: 14 March 1994

Designations
- Named after: Jiro Kondo
- Alternative designations: 1994 EQ_{3}, 1937 JF, 1937 JQ, 1984 FW_{1}
- Minor planet category: Jupiter-crosser asteroid

Orbital characteristics
- Epoch 13 January 2016 (JD 2457400.5)
- Uncertainty parameter 0
- Observation arc: 22150 days (60.64 yr)
- Aphelion: 6.47345 AU (968.414 Gm) (Q)
- Perihelion: 3.03222 AU (453.614 Gm) (q)
- Semi-major axis: 4.75283 AU (711.013 Gm) (a)
- Eccentricity: 0.36202 (e)
- Orbital period (sidereal): 10.36 yr (3784.66 d)
- Mean anomaly: 34.71927° (M)
- Mean motion: 0° 5^{m} 42.435^{s} / day (n)
- Inclination: 5.88716° (i)
- Longitude of ascending node: 117.14167° (Ω)
- Argument of perihelion: 96.127254° (ω)
- Earth MOID: 2.03358 AU (304.219 Gm)
- Jupiter MOID: 0.204605 AU (30.6085 Gm)
- T_{Jupiter}: 2.867

Physical characteristics
- Dimensions: 32.9±5.1 km
- Synodic rotation period: 4.0±2 h
- Geometric albedo: 0.044±0.009
- Spectral type: D
- Absolute magnitude (H): 11.6

6144 Kondojiro (1994 EQ_{3}) is an asteroid discovered on 14 March 1994 by Kin Endate and Kazuro Watanabe at the Kitami Observatory in eastern Hokkaido, Japan. It is named after Jiro Kondo, a Japanese Egyptologist and professor of archaeology at Waseda University.

== Orbit and classification ==
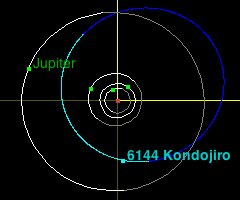
The orbit of 6144 Kondojiro compared to that of Jupiter and the inner planets

The orbit of 6144 Kondojiro is unusual for a number of reasons, including:

- An eccentricity greater than 0.3,
- A semi-major axis between that of an outer main-belt asteroid (3.2 AU < a < 4.6 AU) and a Jupiter trojan (4.6 AU < a < 5.5 AU),
- A relatively low inclination for a Jupiter-crossing minor planet, and
- A lack of proper orbital elements due to recurring perturbations by Jupiter.

It is difficult to classify an object with such a peculiar orbit using a conventional definition. Despite this, the Minor Planet Center (MPC) lists it as a main-belt asteroid, even though both the orbital and physical properties of 6144 Kondojiro suggest that it may be an extinct comet rather than a true asteroid. The JPL Small-Body Database lists only 33 such objects that have an observation arc greater than 30 days.

== See also ==
- List of minor planets
- 944 Hidalgo
- 3552 Don Quixote
