= (612093) 1999 LE31 =

Centaur; damocloid

(612093) 1999 LE_{31}
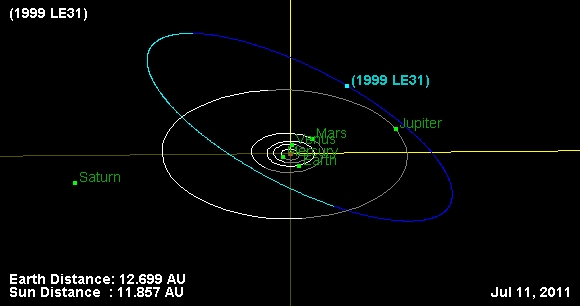
- Orbital diagram of the orbit of 1999 LE_{31}

Discovery
- Discovered by: LINEAR
- Discovery site: Lincoln Lab ETS
- Discovery date: 12 June 1999

Designations
- Minor planet category: centaur · damocloid unusual · distant

Orbital characteristics
- Epoch 27 April 2019 (JD 2458600.5)
- Uncertainty parameter 2
- Observation arc: 19.23 yr (7,022 d)
- Aphelion: 11.913 AU
- Perihelion: 4.3396 AU
- Semi-major axis: 8.1265 AU
- Eccentricity: 0.4660
- Orbital period (sidereal): 23.17 yr (8,462 d)
- Mean anomaly: 316.77°
- Mean motion: 0° 2^{m} 33^{s} / day
- Inclination: 151.81°
- Longitude of ascending node: 292.12°
- Argument of perihelion: 32.319°
- Jupiter MOID: 0.517 AU
- T_{Jupiter}: −1.3090

Physical characteristics
- Mean diameter: 16.8±4.2 km
- Geometric albedo: 0.056±0.026
- Spectral type: B–R = 1.20
- Absolute magnitude (H): 12.5

(612093) 1999 LE_{31} is a centaur and damocloid on a retrograde and eccentric orbit from the outer region of the Solar System. It was first observed on 12 June 1999, by astronomers with the LINEAR program at the Lincoln Lab's ETS near Socorro, New Mexico, in the United States. The unusual object measures approximately 17 kilometers (11 miles) in diameter.

== Description ==
1999 LE_{31} orbits the Sun at a distance of 4.3–11.9 AU once every 23 years and 2 months (8,462 days; semi-major axis of 8.13 AU). Its orbit has an eccentricity of 0.47 and an inclination of 152° with respect to the ecliptic.

It spends most of its orbit located in the outer Solar System between Jupiter and Uranus, and like all centaurs, has an unstable orbit caused by the gravitational influence of the giant planets. Due to this, it must have originated from elsewhere, most likely outside Neptune. It is both a Jupiter and Saturn-crossing minor planet. Of over half a million known minor planets, 1999 LE_{31} is one of about 60 that has a retrograde orbit.

1999 LE_{31} is approximately 16.8 km in diameter. It came to perihelion (closest approach to the Sun) in December 1998. It was last observed in 2000, and next came to perihelion in February 2022. It was recovered in 2016, is well observed since then, and meanwhile numbered by the Minor Planet Center.

== Observations ==
This asteroid has been recorded at such observatories as:

- Lincoln Laboratory (1.0-m f/2.15 reflector + CCD) – location of discovery
- Dominion Astrophysical Observatory (1.82-m reflector + CCD)
- Dynic Astronomical Observatory (0.60-m f/3.7 reflector + CCD)
- European Northern Observatory (1.0-m reflector + CCD)
- Farpoint (0.30-m Schmidt-Cassegrain + CCD)
- Kleť Observatory (0.57-m f/5.2 reflector + CCD)
- McDonald Observatory (0.76-m reflector + CCD)
- Roque de los Muchachos Observatory (1.0-m reflector + CCD)

== See also ==
- 20461 Dioretsa a.k.a. 1999 LD_{31}
- 2000 DG8
- List of exceptional asteroids
