= El Leoncito =

El Leoncito may refer to:

- Leoncito Astronomical Complex, an Argentinian observatory
- El Leoncito National Park, an Argentinian national park
- 2311 El Leoncito, an asteroid
