= 1256 Normannia =

Hilda asteroid and slow rotator

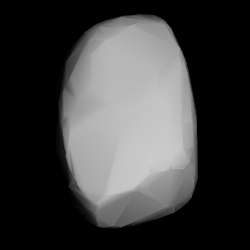
- Shape model of Normannia from its lightcurve

Discovery
- Discovered by: K. Reinmuth
- Discovery site: Heidelberg Obs.
- Discovery date: 8 August 1932

Designations
- Pronunciation: /nɔːrˈmæniə/
- Named after: Normans/Normandy (people/region in France)
- Alternative designations: 1932 PD · 1930 KO
- Minor planet category: main-belt · (outer); Hilda · background

Orbital characteristics
- Epoch 4 September 2017 (JD 2458000.5)
- Uncertainty parameter 0
- Observation arc: 87.43 yr (31,933 days)
- Aphelion: 4.1995 AU
- Perihelion: 3.5903 AU
- Semi-major axis: 3.8949 AU
- Eccentricity: 0.0782
- Orbital period (sidereal): 7.69 yr (2,808 days)
- Mean anomaly: 5.5363°
- Mean motion: 0° 7^{m} 41.52^{s} / day
- Inclination: 4.1732°
- Longitude of ascending node: 236.94°
- Argument of perihelion: 101.06°

Physical characteristics
- Dimensions: 68.253±0.436 km 69.02 km (derived); 69.22±2.8 km 73.26±2.34 km
- Synodic rotation period: 6.4±0.1h (poor) (Note: Aznar (2014) web: Observation from 24 March 2014: rotation period 6.4±0.1 hours with a brightness amplitude of 0.09±0.01 mag. Summary figures at the LCDB); 6.8 h (poor); 18.13±0.02 h 18.8 (poor) h 488.063±7.4017 h
- Geometric albedo: 0.0364 (derived); 0.046±0.003; 0.05±0.01; 0.0504±0.004; 0.052±0.010
- Spectral type: Tholen = D · D B–V = 0.737; U–B = 0.239
- Absolute magnitude (H): 9.475±0.002 (R) · 9.66 · 9.74 · 9.94±0.71 · 10.02

1256 Normannia (prov. designation: 1932 PD) is a dark Hilda asteroid and slow rotator from the outermost regions of the asteroid belt, approximately 69 kilometers (40 miles) in diameter. It was discovered on 8 August 1932, by astronomer Karl Reinmuth at the Heidelberg-Königstuhl State Observatory in Germany. The asteroid was likely named after the Normans who gave their name to the region of Normandy in France.

== Orbit and classification ==
Normannia is a member of the Hilda group of asteroids, which are in 3:2 orbital resonance with the gas-giant Jupiter. When applying the Hierarchical Clustering Method to its proper orbital elements, Normannia is a background asteroid that does not belong to neither the Hilda family (001) nor the Schubart family (002), the only two asteroid families known within the Hilda group.

It orbits the Sun in the outermost asteroid belt at a distance of 3.6–4.2 AU once every 7 years and 8 months (2,808 days; semi-major axis of 3.89 AU). Its orbit has an eccentricity of 0.08 and an inclination of 4° with respect to the ecliptic. The body's observation arc begins with its first identification as 1930 KO at Lowell Observatory in May 1930, more than two years prior to its official discovery observation at Heidelberg.

== Naming ==
This minor planet was probably named after the Normans ("Norseman"), mainly Danish and Norwegian Vikings who settled in the historical region of Normandy in northwestern France. The official naming citation was mentioned in The Names of the Minor Planets by Paul Herget in 1955 (H 115).

== Physical characteristics ==
In the Tholen classification, Normannia is a dark D-type asteroid. Observations by Pan-STARRS and by the Wide-field Infrared Survey Explorer (WISE) also characterized the asteroid as a D-type.

=== Rotation period ===
In September 2010, a rotational lightcurve of Normannia was obtained from photometric observations by astronomers at the Palomar Transient Factory in California. Lightcurve analysis gave a rotation period of 488.063 hours with a brightness amplitude of 0.39 magnitude (U=2). This makes it one of the Top-100 slow rotators known to exist. Other observations gave several poor lightcurves with a much shorter period between 6.4 and 18.8 hours (U=1/1/1/n.a.).

=== Diameter and albedo ===
According to the surveys carried out by the Infrared Astronomical Satellite IRAS, the Japanese Akari satellite and the NEOWISE mission of NASA's WISE telescope, Normannia measures between 68.253 and 73.26 kilometers in diameter and its surface has an albedo between 0.046 and 0.052.

The Collaborative Asteroid Lightcurve Link derives an albedo of 0.0364 and a diameter of 69.02 kilometers based on an absolute magnitude of 10.02.
