= 2312 Duboshin =

Main-belt asteroid

Discovery
- Discovered by: N. Chernykh
- Discovery site: Crimea–Nauchnij
- Discovery date: 1 April 1976

Designations
- Named after: Georgij Nikolaevich Duboshin (Soviet-Russian astronomer)
- Alternative designations: 1976 GU_{2} · 1943 DH; 1971 QJ · 1972 TJ_{7} 1973 YE_{2} · 1975 CF; 1976 JN
- Minor planet category: main-belt · (outer); Hilda · background

Orbital characteristics
- Epoch 23 March 2018 (JD 2458200.5)
- Uncertainty parameter 0
- Observation arc: 74.35 yr (27,157 d)
- Aphelion: 4.5826 AU
- Perihelion: 3.3399 AU
- Semi-major axis: 3.9613 AU
- Eccentricity: 0.1568
- Orbital period (sidereal): 7.88 yr (2,880 d)
- Mean anomaly: 250.24°
- Mean motion: 0° 7^{m} 30^{s} / day
- Inclination: 5.1650°
- Longitude of ascending node: 61.441°
- Argument of perihelion: 342.00°

Physical characteristics
- Mean diameter: 50.122±0.750 km 54.94±3.1 km 58.53±1.37 km
- Synodic rotation period: 50.78±0.03 h (Note: Lightcurve plot of (2312) Duboshin, obtained by R. D. Stephens at Center for Solar System Studies (CS3) with 659 data points taken between 19 March and 16 April 2016. Rotation period 50.78±0.03 hours with a brightness amplitude of 0.15±0.02 mag. Quality code of 2+. Summary figures at the LCDB and CS3)
- Geometric albedo: 0.044±0.002; 0.0496±0.006; 0.06±0.01
- Spectral type: Tholen = D · D B–V = 0.73; U–B = 0.246
- Absolute magnitude (H): 10.18 · 10.2

2312 Duboshin, provisional designation 1976 GU_{2}, is a dark Hildian asteroid from the outermost regions of the asteroid belt, approximately 54 kilometers (34 miles) in diameter. It was discovered on 1 April 1976, by Soviet–Russian astronomer Nikolai Chernykh at the Crimean Astrophysical Observatory in Nauchnij, on the Crimean peninsula. It was named after Russian astronomer Georgij Duboshin. The D-type asteroid has a longer than average rotation period of 50.78 hours.

== Orbit and classification ==
Duboshin is an asteroids of the dynamical Hilda group which stay in a 3:2 orbital resonance with Jupiter. It is, however, not a member of the collisional Hilda family but a non-family asteroid of the main belt's background population when applying the hierarchical clustering method to its proper orbital elements.

It orbits the Sun in the outermost asteroid belt at a distance of 3.3–4.6 AU once every 7 years and 11 months (2,880 days; semi-major axis of 3.96 AU). Its orbit has an eccentricity of 0.16 and an inclination of 5° with respect to the ecliptic. The asteroid was first observed as 1943 DH at Turku Observatory in February 1943, where the body's observation arc begins on the same day with a precovery.

== Physical characteristics ==
In the Tholen classification, Duboshin is a dark D-type asteroid. The Wide-field Infrared Survey Explorer (WISE) also characterized it as a D-type.

=== Rotation period ===
In April 2016, a rotational lightcurve of Duboshin was obtained from photometric observations by Robert Stephens at the Center for Solar System Studies (U81) in California. Lightcurve analysis gave a long rotation period of 50.78 hours with a brightness amplitude of 0.15 magnitude, indicative for a nearly spherical shape (U=2+). While not being a slow rotator, it has a notably longer period than that seen for most other asteroids, which rotate every 2 to 20 hours once around their axis.

=== Diameter and albedo ===
According to the surveys carried out by the Infrared Astronomical Satellite IRAS, the Japanese Akari satellite and the NEOWISE mission of NASA's WISE telescope, Duboshin measures between 50.122 and 58.53 kilometers in diameter and its surface has an albedo between 0.044 and 0.06.

The Collaborative Asteroid Lightcurve Link adopts the results obtained by IRAS, that is, an albedo of 0.0496 and a diameter of 54.94 kilometers based on an absolute magnitude of 10.18.

== Naming ==
This minor planet was named after Russian astronomer Georgij Nikolaevich Duboshin (1904–1986), expert on celestial mechanics, author of several textbooks, and former president of IAU's Commission 7, Celestial Mechanics and Dynamical Astronomy in the early 1970s. The official naming citation was published by the Minor Planet Center on 1 December 1982 (M.P.C. 7471).
