= 20898 Fountainhills =

Main-belt asteroid

Discovery
- Discovered by: C. W. Juels
- Discovery site: Fountain Hills Obs.
- Discovery date: 30 November 2000

Designations
- Named after: Fountain Hills (U.S. city in Arizona)
- Alternative designations: 2000 WE_{147} · 1975 BE; 1994 NA_{1}
- Minor planet category: main-belt · (outer) background · ACO

Orbital characteristics
- Epoch 23 March 2018 (JD 2458200.5)
- Uncertainty parameter 0
- Observation arc: 66.49 yr (24,285 d)
- Aphelion: 6.1881 AU
- Perihelion: 2.2572 AU
- Semi-major axis: 4.2226 AU
- Eccentricity: 0.4654
- Orbital period (sidereal): 8.68 yr (3,169 d)
- Mean anomaly: 328.44°
- Mean motion: 0° 6^{m} 48.96^{s} / day
- Inclination: 45.523°
- Longitude of ascending node: 293.19°
- Argument of perihelion: 234.78°
- Jupiter MOID: 0.5295 AU
- T_{Jupiter}: 2.3490

Physical characteristics
- Mean diameter: 37.08 km (derived); 37.31±1.1 km 41.53±0.85 km
- Synodic rotation period: 12.84±0.03 h
- Geometric albedo: 0.0200 (derived); 0.037±0.007; 0.0505±0.003
- Spectral type: D B–V = 0.767±0.008; V–R = 0.428±0.010; V–I = 0.826±0.008
- Absolute magnitude (H): 11.0 · 11.10; 12.02

20898 Fountainhills (provisional designation 2000 WE_{147}) is a dark asteroid in a cometary orbit (ACO) from the outermost regions of the asteroid belt, approximately 37 kilometers (23 miles) in diameter. It was discovered on 30 November 2000, by American amateur astronomer Charles W. Juels at the Fountain Hills Observatory in Arizona, United States. The D-type asteroid has a rotation period of 12.84 hours. It was named for the city of Fountain Hills, Arizona, in the United States.

== Orbit and classification ==
Fountainhills is a non-family from the main belt's background population. For an object in the asteroid belt, its orbit is extremely eccentric and highly inclined. With a Jupiter tisserand (T_{Jupiter}) of less than 3 and with no observable coma, it is an asteroid in cometary orbit (ACO) and a candidate for being a dormant or extinct comet. It is however, not a damocloid based on current orbital criteria, which typically have a T_{Jupiter} of less than 2 (also see List of damocloids).

The asteroid orbits the Sun in the outer main-belt at a distance of 2.3–6.2 AU once every 8 years and 8 months (3,169 days; semi-major axis of 4.22 AU). Its orbit has an eccentricity of 0.47 and an inclination of 46° with respect to the ecliptic. The body's observation arc begins with a precovery taken at Palomar Observatory during the Digitized Sky Survey in July 1951, more than 49 years prior to its official discovery observation at Fountain Hills.

Fountainhills is the second most eccentric object as large as it is inside the orbit of Jupiter (after 1036 Ganymed), and the most highly inclined object of its size within the orbit of Jupiter. While its aphelion is outside that of Jupiter's orbit, it is so highly inclined that its furthest point from the Sun is far out of the ecliptic.

== Physical characteristics ==
Fountainhills has been characterized as a dark D-type asteroid in a study of asteroids in cometary orbits using the Nordic Optical Telescope at Roque de los Muchachos Observatory on the Canary Island, Spain.

=== Rotation period ===
In January 2001, a rotational lightcurve of Fountainhills was obtained from photometric observations by American amateur astronomer Bill Holliday at River Oaks Observatory (915) in Texas. Lightcurve analysis gave a well-defined rotation period of 12.84 hours with a brightness amplitude of 0.20 magnitude (U=3).

=== Diameter and albedo ===
According to the survey carried out by the Infrared Astronomical Satellite IRAS, and on data obtained by the NEOWISE mission of NASA's Wide-field Infrared Survey Explorer, Fountainhills measures between 37.31 and 41.53 kilometers in diameter and its surface has an albedo between 0.037 and 0.0505. The Collaborative Asteroid Lightcurve Link derives an albedo of 0.02 and a diameter of 37.08 kilometers based on an absolute magnitude of 12.02.

== Naming ==
This minor planet was named after the town of Fountain Hills, located near the Sonoran Desert on the foothills of the McDowell Mountains, home to one of the world's tallest water fountains. The official naming citation was published by the Minor Planet Center on 9 May 2001 (M.P.C. 42678).
