= Lists of minor planets =

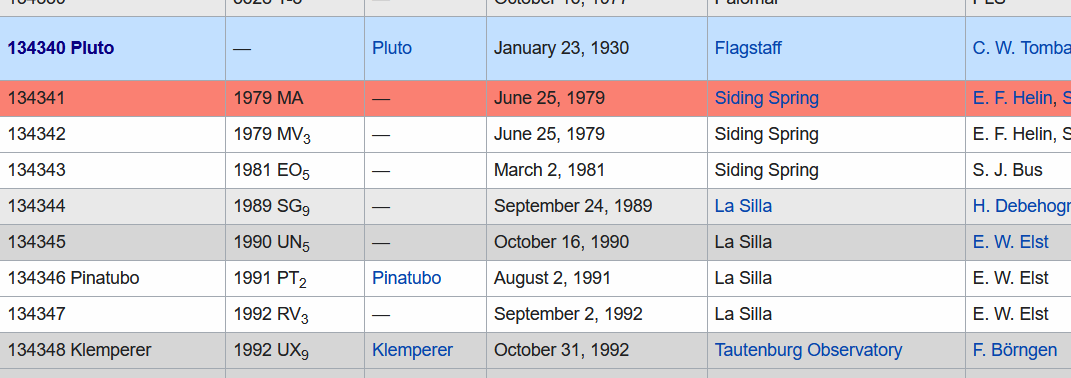
The catalog of minor planets is published by the Minor Planet Center and contains 895,000 entries, including 134340 Pluto. For an overview, see index.

Growing number of minor planets since 1995:
- numbered and named bodies (listed)
- numbered but unnamed bodies (listed)
- unnumbered bodies (not part of this list)

The following is a list of minor planets in ascending numerical order. Minor planets are small bodies in the Solar System: asteroids, distant objects, and dwarf planets, but not comets. As of 2022, the vast majority (97.3%) are asteroids from the asteroid belt. Their discoveries are certified by the Minor Planet Center, which assigns them numbers on behalf of the International Astronomical Union. Every year, the Center publishes thousands of newly numbered minor planets in its Minor Planet Circulars (see index). As of May 2026, the 895,910 numbered minor planets made up more than half of the 1,547,929 observed small Solar System bodies, of which the rest were unnumbered minor planets and comets.

The catalog's first object is 1 Ceres, discovered by Giuseppe Piazzi in 1801, while its best-known entry is Pluto, listed as 134340 Pluto. Both are among the 3% of numbered minor planets with names, mostly of people, places, and figures from mythology and fiction. (4596) 1981 QB and 884759 Compostela are currently the lowest-numbered unnamed and highest-numbered named minor planets, respectively.

There are more than a thousand minor-planet discoverers observing from a growing list of registered observatories. The most prolific discoverers are Spacewatch, LINEAR, MLS, NEAT and CSS. It is expected that the upcoming survey by the Vera C. Rubin Observatory will discover another 5 million minor planets during the next ten years—almost a tenfold increase from current numbers. While all main-belt asteroids with a diameter above 10 km (6.2 mi) have been discovered, there might be as many as 10 trillion 1 m (3.3 ft)-sized asteroids or larger out to the orbit of Jupiter; and more than a trillion minor planets in the Kuiper belt. For minor planets grouped by a particular aspect or property, see § Specific lists.

== Description of partial lists ==
The list of minor planets consists of more than 700 partial lists, each containing 1000 minor planets grouped into 10 tables. The data is sourced from the Minor Planet Center (MPC) and expanded with data from the JPL SBDB (mean-diameter), Johnston's archive (sub-classification) and others (see detailed field descriptions below). For an overview of all existing partial lists, see § Main index.

The information given for a minor planet includes a permanent and provisional designation (§ Designation), a citation that links to the meanings of minor planet names (only if named), the discovery date, location, and credited discoverers (§ Discovery and § Discoverers), a category with a more refined classification than the principal grouping represented by the background color (§ Category), a mean-diameter, sourced from JPL's SBDB or otherwise calculated estimates in italics (§ Diameter), and a reference (Ref) to the corresponding pages at MPC and JPL SBDB.

The MPC may credit one or several astronomers, a survey or similar program, or even the observatory site with the discovery. In the first column of the table, an existing stand-alone article is linked in boldface, while (self-)redirects are never linked. Discoverers, discovery site and category are only linked if they differ from the preceding catalog entry.

=== Example ===
| Designation | | | Discovery | | | Properties | | Ref |
| Permanent | Provisional | Named after | Date | Site | Discoverer(s) | Category | Diam. | Ref |
|---|---|---|---|---|---|---|---|---|
| 189001 | 4889 P-L | — | September 24, 1960 | Palomar | C. J. van Houten, I. van Houten-Groeneveld, T. Gehrels | · | 3.4 km | MPC · JPL |
| 189002 | 6760 P-L | — | September 24, 1960 | Palomar | C. J. van Houten, I. van Houten-Groeneveld, T. Gehrels | · | 1.5 km | MPC · JPL |
| 189003 | 3009 T-3 | — | October 16, 1977 | Palomar | C. J. van Houten, I. van Houten-Groeneveld, T. Gehrels | · | 4.4 km | MPC · JPL |
| 189004 Capys | 3184 T-3 | Capys | October 16, 1977 | Palomar | C. J. van Houten, I. van Houten-Groeneveld, T. Gehrels | L5 | 10 km | MPC · JPL |
| 189005 | 5176 T-3 | — | October 16, 1977 | Palomar | C. J. van Houten, I. van Houten-Groeneveld, T. Gehrels | · | 2.9 km | MPC · JPL |

The example above shows five catalog entries from one of the partial lists. All five asteroids were discovered at Palomar Observatory. The MPC directly credits the survey's principal investigators, that is, the astronomers Cornelis van Houten, Ingrid van Houten-Groeneveld and Tom Gehrels. 189004 Capys, discovered on 16 October 1977, is the only named minor planet among these five. Its background color indicates that it is a Jupiter trojan (from the Trojan camp at Jupiter's L_{5}), estimated to be approximately 10 kilometers in diameter. All other objects are smaller asteroids from the inner (white), central (light-grey) and outer regions (dark grey) of the asteroid belt. The provisional designation for all objects is an uncommon survey designation.

=== Designation ===
After discovery, minor planets generally receive a provisional designation, e.g. 1989 AC, then a leading sequential number in parentheses, e.g. (4179) 1989 AC, turning it into a permanent designation (numbered minor planet). Optionally, a name can be given, replacing the provisional part of the designation, e.g. 4179 Toutatis. (On Wikipedia, named minor planets also drop their parentheses.)

In modern times, a minor planet receives a sequential number only after it has been observed several times over at least 4 oppositions. (Note: An opposition is the time when a body is at its furthest apparent point from the Sun, and in this case is defined as the time when an asteroid is far enough from the Sun to be observed from the Earth. In most cases, this is about 4 to 6 months a year. Some notable minor planets are exceptions to this rule, such as 367943 Duende.) Minor planets whose orbits are not (yet) precisely known are known by their provisional designation. This rule was not necessarily followed in earlier times, and some bodies received a number but subsequently became lost minor planets. The 2000 recovery of 719 Albert, which had been lost for nearly 89 years, eliminated the last numbered lost asteroid. Only after a number is assigned is the minor planet eligible to receive a name. Usually the discoverer has up to 10 years to pick a name; many minor planets now remain unnamed. Especially towards the end of the twentieth century, large-scale automated asteroid discovery programs such as LINEAR have increased the pace of discoveries so much that the vast majority of minor planets will most likely never receive names.

For these reasons, the sequence of numbers only approximately matches the timeline of discovery. In extreme cases, such as lost minor planets, there may be a considerable mismatch: for instance the high-numbered 69230 Hermes was originally discovered in 1937, but it was lost until 2003. Only after it was rediscovered could its orbit be established and a number assigned.

- Spacewatch: 248,354 (27.7%)
- Mt. Lemmon Survey: 173,520 (19.4%)
- LINEAR: 153,276 (17.1%)
- Pan-STARRS: 108,968 (12.2%)
- NEAT: 52,193 (5.8%)
- CSS: 37,136 (4.1%)
- LONEOS: 23,493 (2.6%)
- WISE: 10,112 (1.1%)
- Palomar–Leiden survey: 4,606 (0.5%)
- Siding Spring Survey: 4,396 (0.5%)
- All others: 79,856 (8.9%)
Top 10 discoverers of minor planets account for more than 90% of all discoveries (total of 895910 numbered bodies, as of 30 May 2026, adjusted MPC-figures).

=== Discoverers ===
The MPC credits more than 1,000 professional and amateur astronomers as discoverers of minor planets. Many of them have discovered only a few minor planets or even just co-discovered a single one. Moreover, a discoverer does not need to be a human being. There are about 300 programs, surveys and observatories credited as discoverers. Among these, a small group of U.S. programs and surveys actually account for most of all discoveries made so far (see pie chart). As the total of numbered minor planets is growing by the tens of thousands every year, all statistical figures are constantly changing. In contrast to the Top 10 discoverers displayed in this articles, the MPC summarizes the total of discoveries somewhat differently, that is by a distinct group of discoverers. For example, bodies discovered in the Palomar–Leiden Survey are directly credited to the program's principal investigators.

=== Discovery site ===
Observatories, telescopes and surveys that report astrometric observations of small Solar System bodies to the Minor Planet Center receive a numeric or alphanumeric MPC code such as 675 for the Palomar Observatory, or G96 for the Mount Lemmon Survey. On numbering, the MPC may directly credit such an observatory or program as the discoverer of an object, rather than one or several astronomers.

=== Category ===
In this catalog, minor planets are classified into one of 8 principal orbital groups and highlighted with a distinct color. These are:

| Near-Earth obj. | MBA (inner) | MBA (outer) | Centaur |
| Mars-crosser | MBA (middle) | Jupiter trojan | Trans-Neptunian obj. |
| Unclassified |

The vast majority of minor planets are evenly distributed between the inner-, central and outer parts of the asteroid belt, which are separated by the two Kirkwood gaps at 2.5 and 2.82 AU. Nearly 97.5% of all minor planets are main-belt asteroids (MBA), while Jupiter trojans, Mars-crossing and near-Earth asteroids each account for less than 1% of the overall population. Only a small number of distant minor planets, that is the centaurs and trans-Neptunian objects, have been numbered so far. In the partial lists, table column "category" further refines this principal grouping:

- main-belt asteroids show their family membership based on the synthetic hierarchical clustering method by Nesvorný (2014), (Note: There are two sources used to determine asteroid families by the synthetic hierarchical clustering method. The first one, Identification and Dynamical Properties of Asteroid Families (D. Nesvorný, 2014), is used for asteroids up to number 393,347. The second one is from the Asteroid Dynamic Site (AstDyS) and covers the individual asteroid family membership for bodies above that number (A. Milani, Z. Knežević, 2014), including all listed bodies that have been numbered since last publication in 2018. Following 8 families from latter were mapped to family names of former: Hertha→Nysa, Minerva→Gefion, Klytaemnestra→Telramund, Lydia→Padua, Innes→Rafita, Zdenekhorsky→Nemesis, Klumpkea→Tirela, Gantrisch→Lixiaohua, Harig→Witt. All other families not listed by Nesvorný at AstDyS do not show an abbreviated family name with a linked "Family Identification Number" (FIN). Instead, listed entries for such members give the designation of their parent body, e.g. (5) for 5 Astraea.)
- resonant asteroids are displayed by their numerical ratio and include the Hildas (3:2), Thules (4:3) and Griquas (2:1), while the Jupiter trojans (1:1) display whether they belong to the Greek (L_{4}) or Trojan camp (L_{5}),
- Hungaria asteroids (H), are labelled in italics (H), when they are not members of the collisional family
- near-Earth objects are divided into the Aten (ATE), Amor (AMO), Apollo (APO), and Atira (IEO) group, (Note: Split-up of NEOs into Amor, Aten, Apollo and Atira asteroid is based on the orbital criteria given in adjunct table. The data is sourced from JPL Small-Body Orbital Elements "Numbered Asteroids (50 MB)" file) with some of them being potentially hazardous asteroids (PHA), and/or larger than one kilometer in diameter (+1km) as determined by the MPC.
- trans-Neptunian objects are divided into dynamical subgroups including cubewanos (hot or cold), scattered disc objects, plutinos and other Neptunian resonances,
- comet-like and/or retrograde objects with a T_{Jupiter} value below 2 are tagged with damocloid,
- other unusual objects based on MPC's and Johnston's lists are labelled unusual,
- binary and trinary asteroids with companions are tagged with "moon" and link to their corresponding entry in minor-planet moon,
- objects with an exceptionally long or short rotation period are tagged with "slow" (period of 100+ hours) or "fast" (period of less than 2.2 hours) and link to their corresponding entry in List of slow rotators and List of fast rotators, respectively.
- minor planets which also received a periodic-comet number (such as 95P/Chiron for 2060 Chiron) link to the List of numbered comets

| Principal orbital groups^{(c)} | MPs (#) | MPs (%) | Distribution | Orbital criteria |
|---|---|---|---|---|
| Near-Earth object^{(a)} | 3,812 | 0.43% | | q < 1.3 AU |
| Mars-crosser | 9,054 | 1.02% | | 1.3 AU < q < 1.666 AU; a < 3.2 AU |
| MBA (inner) | 254,964 | 28.74% | | a < 2.5 AU; q > 1.666 AU |
| MBA (middle) | 313,111 | 35.30% | | 2.5 AU < a < 2.82 AU; q > 1.666 AU |
| MBA (outer) | 294,316 | 33.18% | | 2.82 AU < a < 4.6 AU; q > 1.666 AU |
| Jupiter trojan | 10,572 | 1.19% | | 4.6 AU < a < 5.5 AU; e < 0.3 |
| Centaur | 216 | 0.02% | | 5.5 AU < a < 30.1 AU |
| Trans-Neptunian object | 1,044 | 0.12% | | a > 30.1 AU |
| Total (numbered) | 887,103^{(b)} | 100% | | Source: JPL's SBDB |

^{(a)} NEO-subgroups with number of members: Aten (286), Amor (1,641), Apollo (1,966), and Atira (13) asteroids.
^{(b)} Including 14 unclassified bodies: 6144 Kondojiro, 32511, 241944, 275618, 487496, 490171, 514107 Kaʻepaokaʻāwela, 584530, 613709, 669525, 694001, 832966, 841330, 855229 (colored as for being unclassified). (Note: There are a few minor planets that remain unclassified based on the defined orbital criteria. At least five of these bodies have a semi-major axis too large to be an outer main-belt asteroid, and an orbit too eccentric to be classified as a Jupiter trojan (JPL classifies these bodies simply as "asteroids", while the MPC, which never distinguishes between inner, outer and middle MBAs, classifies them as "main-belt asteroids"). Other unclassified minor planets include Mars-crossers (as per MPC) with a semi-major axis of that of an outer-MBA (as per JPL).)
^{(c)} This chart has been created using a classification scheme adopted from and with data provided by the JPL Small-Body Database. (Note: This table adopts the orbital criteria used by the JPL Small-Body Database, with the exception of (1.) using a different limit to categorize asteroids of the intermediate main belt (i.e. a = 2.5–2.82 AU), and (2.) adding another orbital criteria to outer MBAs (q > 1.666 AU). The values for an object's perihelion and aphelion need to be derived from the semi-major axis and the eccentricity as they are not provided in the data source (q = a(1-e); Q = a(1+e)).)

=== Diameter ===
If available, a minor planet's mean diameter in meters (m) or kilometers (km) is taken from the NEOWISE mission of NASA's Wide-field Infrared Survey Explorer, which the Small-Body Database has also adopted. Mean diameters are rounded to two significant figures if smaller than 100 kilometers. As of March 2026, ~15.3% (135,623) of numbered minor plants have a known diameter. Estimates are in italics and calculated from a magnitude-to-diameter conversion, using an assumed albedo derived from the body's orbital parameters or, if available, from a family-specific mean albedo (also see asteroid family table). (Note: Diameters are calculated as a function of absolute magnitude (H) and geometric albedo (p) as documented at CNEOS. While "H" is taken from the Ascii files at the Small Body Data Base, the assumed albedo is taken from an asteroid-family specific figure (Nesvorny, synthetic HCM v.3, as shown in table) or, alternatively – for background asteroids, Jupiter trojans, near-Earth and distant objects – from the body's orbital parameters (as per 2. Taxonomic Class, orbital class, and albedo at the LCDB and/or Johnston's Archive). This is: 0.20 (inner MBAs), 0.14 (NEOs), 0.057 (outer MBAs and Jupiter trojans), 0.10 (middle MBAs with a semi-major axis between 2.6 and 2.7 AU), 0.09 (centaurs and TNOs). The conversion formula for a given albedo and abs. magnitude is: pow(10, (3.1236 − (0.5 × log10(p)) − (0.2 × H))).)

== Main index ==
This is an overview of all existing partial lists of numbered minor planets (LoMP). Each table stands for 100,000 minor planets, each cell for a specific partial list of 1,000 sequentially numbered bodies. The data is sourced from the Minor Planet Center. For an introduction, see § top.

=== Numberings 1–100,000 ===
| 1–1000 | 1,001 | 2,001 | 3,001 | 4,001 | 5,001 | 6,001 | 7,001 | 8,001 | 9,001 |
| 10,001 | 11,001 | 12,001 | 13,001 | 14,001 | 15,001 | 16,001 | 17,001 | 18,001 | 19,001 |
| 20,001 | 21,001 | 22,001 | 23,001 | 24,001 | 25,001 | 26,001 | 27,001 | 28,001 | 29,001 |
| 30,001 | 31,001 | 32,001 | 33,001 | 34,001 | 35,001 | 36,001 | 37,001 | 38,001 | 39,001 |
| 40,001 | 41,001 | 42,001 | 43,001 | 44,001 | 45,001 | 46,001 | 47,001 | 48,001 | 49,001 |
| 50,001 | 51,001 | 52,001 | 53,001 | 54,001 | 55,001 | 56,001 | 57,001 | 58,001 | 59,001 |
| 60,001 | 61,001 | 62,001 | 63,001 | 64,001 | 65,001 | 66,001 | 67,001 | 68,001 | 69,001 |
| 70,001 | 71,001 | 72,001 | 73,001 | 74,001 | 75,001 | 76,001 | 77,001 | 78,001 | 79,001 |
| 80,001 | 81,001 | 82,001 | 83,001 | 84,001 | 85,001 | 86,001 | 87,001 | 88,001 | 89,001 |
| 90,001 | 91,001 | 92,001 | 93,001 | 94,001 | 95,001 | 96,001 | 97,001 | 98,001 | 99,001 |

=== Numberings 100,001–200,000 ===
| 100,001 | 101,001 | 102,001 | 103,001 | 104,001 | 105,001 | 106,001 | 107,001 | 108,001 | 109,001 |
| 110,001 | 111,001 | 112,001 | 113,001 | 114,001 | 115,001 | 116,001 | 117,001 | 118,001 | 119,001 |
| 120,001 | 121,001 | 122,001 | 123,001 | 124,001 | 125,001 | 126,001 | 127,001 | 128,001 | 129,001 |
| 130,001 | 131,001 | 132,001 | 133,001 | 134,001 | 135,001 | 136,001 | 137,001 | 138,001 | 139,001 |
| 140,001 | 141,001 | 142,001 | 143,001 | 144,001 | 145,001 | 146,001 | 147,001 | 148,001 | 149,001 |
| 150,001 | 151,001 | 152,001 | 153,001 | 154,001 | 155,001 | 156,001 | 157,001 | 158,001 | 159,001 |
| 160,001 | 161,001 | 162,001 | 163,001 | 164,001 | 165,001 | 166,001 | 167,001 | 168,001 | 169,001 |
| 170,001 | 171,001 | 172,001 | 173,001 | 174,001 | 175,001 | 176,001 | 177,001 | 178,001 | 179,001 |
| 180,001 | 181,001 | 182,001 | 183,001 | 184,001 | 185,001 | 186,001 | 187,001 | 188,001 | 189,001 |
| 190,001 | 191,001 | 192,001 | 193,001 | 194,001 | 195,001 | 196,001 | 197,001 | 198,001 | 199,001 |

=== Numberings 200,001–300,000 ===
| 200,001 | 201,001 | 202,001 | 203,001 | 204,001 | 205,001 | 206,001 | 207,001 | 208,001 | 209,001 |
| 210,001 | 211,001 | 212,001 | 213,001 | 214,001 | 215,001 | 216,001 | 217,001 | 218,001 | 219,001 |
| 220,001 | 221,001 | 222,001 | 223,001 | 224,001 | 225,001 | 226,001 | 227,001 | 228,001 | 229,001 |
| 230,001 | 231,001 | 232,001 | 233,001 | 234,001 | 235,001 | 236,001 | 237,001 | 238,001 | 239,001 |
| 240,001 | 241,001 | 242,001 | 243,001 | 244,001 | 245,001 | 246,001 | 247,001 | 248,001 | 249,001 |
| 250,001 | 251,001 | 252,001 | 253,001 | 254,001 | 255,001 | 256,001 | 257,001 | 258,001 | 259,001 |
| 260,001 | 261,001 | 262,001 | 263,001 | 264,001 | 265,001 | 266,001 | 267,001 | 268,001 | 269,001 |
| 270,001 | 271,001 | 272,001 | 273,001 | 274,001 | 275,001 | 276,001 | 277,001 | 278,001 | 279,001 |
| 280,001 | 281,001 | 282,001 | 283,001 | 284,001 | 285,001 | 286,001 | 287,001 | 288,001 | 289,001 |
| 290,001 | 291,001 | 292,001 | 293,001 | 294,001 | 295,001 | 296,001 | 297,001 | 298,001 | 299,001 |

=== Numberings 300,001–400,000 ===
| 300,001 | 301,001 | 302,001 | 303,001 | 304,001 | 305,001 | 306,001 | 307,001 | 308,001 | 309,001 |
| 310,001 | 311,001 | 312,001 | 313,001 | 314,001 | 315,001 | 316,001 | 317,001 | 318,001 | 319,001 |
| 320,001 | 321,001 | 322,001 | 323,001 | 324,001 | 325,001 | 326,001 | 327,001 | 328,001 | 329,001 |
| 330,001 | 331,001 | 332,001 | 333,001 | 334,001 | 335,001 | 336,001 | 337,001 | 338,001 | 339,001 |
| 340,001 | 341,001 | 342,001 | 343,001 | 344,001 | 345,001 | 346,001 | 347,001 | 348,001 | 349,001 |
| 350,001 | 351,001 | 352,001 | 353,001 | 354,001 | 355,001 | 356,001 | 357,001 | 358,001 | 359,001 |
| 360,001 | 361,001 | 362,001 | 363,001 | 364,001 | 365,001 | 366,001 | 367,001 | 368,001 | 369,001 |
| 370,001 | 371,001 | 372,001 | 373,001 | 374,001 | 375,001 | 376,001 | 377,001 | 378,001 | 379,001 |
| 380,001 | 381,001 | 382,001 | 383,001 | 384,001 | 385,001 | 386,001 | 387,001 | 388,001 | 389,001 |
| 390,001 | 391,001 | 392,001 | 393,001 | 394,001 | 395,001 | 396,001 | 397,001 | 398,001 | 399,001 |

=== Numberings 400,001–500,000 ===
| 400,001 | 401,001 | 402,001 | 403,001 | 404,001 | 405,001 | 406,001 | 407,001 | 408,001 | 409,001 |
| 410,001 | 411,001 | 412,001 | 413,001 | 414,001 | 415,001 | 416,001 | 417,001 | 418,001 | 419,001 |
| 420,001 | 421,001 | 422,001 | 423,001 | 424,001 | 425,001 | 426,001 | 427,001 | 428,001 | 429,001 |
| 430,001 | 431,001 | 432,001 | 433,001 | 434,001 | 435,001 | 436,001 | 437,001 | 438,001 | 439,001 |
| 440,001 | 441,001 | 442,001 | 443,001 | 444,001 | 445,001 | 446,001 | 447,001 | 448,001 | 449,001 |
| 450,001 | 451,001 | 452,001 | 453,001 | 454,001 | 455,001 | 456,001 | 457,001 | 458,001 | 459,001 |
| 460,001 | 461,001 | 462,001 | 463,001 | 464,001 | 465,001 | 466,001 | 467,001 | 468,001 | 469,001 |
| 470,001 | 471,001 | 472,001 | 473,001 | 474,001 | 475,001 | 476,001 | 477,001 | 478,001 | 479,001 |
| 480,001 | 481,001 | 482,001 | 483,001 | 484,001 | 485,001 | 486,001 | 487,001 | 488,001 | 489,001 |
| 490,001 | 491,001 | 492,001 | 493,001 | 494,001 | 495,001 | 496,001 | 497,001 | 498,001 | 499,001 |

=== Numberings 500,001–600,000 ===
| 500,001 | 501,001 | 502,001 | 503,001 | 504,001 | 505,001 | 506,001 | 507,001 | 508,001 | 509,001 |
| 510,001 | 511,001 | 512,001 | 513,001 | 514,001 | 515,001 | 516,001 | 517,001 | 518,001 | 519,001 |
| 520,001 | 521,001 | 522,001 | 523,001 | 524,001 | 525,001 | 526,001 | 527,001 | 528,001 | 529,001 |
| 530,001 | 531,001 | 532,001 | 533,001 | 534,001 | 535,001 | 536,001 | 537,001 | 538,001 | 539,001 |
| 540,001 | 541,001 | 542,001 | 543,001 | 544,001 | 545,001 | 546,001 | 547,001 | 548,001 | 549,001 |
| 550,001 | 551,001 | 552,001 | 553,001 | 554,001 | 555,001 | 556,001 | 557,001 | 558,001 | 559,001 |
| 560,001 | 561,001 | 562,001 | 563,001 | 564,001 | 565,001 | 566,001 | 567,001 | 568,001 | 569,001 |
| 570,001 | 571,001 | 572,001 | 573,001 | 574,001 | 575,001 | 576,001 | 577,001 | 578,001 | 579,001 |
| 580,001 | 581,001 | 582,001 | 583,001 | 584,001 | 585,001 | 586,001 | 587,001 | 588,001 | 589,001 |
| 590,001 | 591,001 | 592,001 | 593,001 | 594,001 | 595,001 | 596,001 | 597,001 | 598,001 | 599,001 |

=== Numberings 600,001–700,000 ===
| 600,001 | 601,001 | 602,001 | 603,001 | 604,001 | 605,001 | 606,001 | 607,001 | 608,001 | 609,001 |
| 610,001 | 611,001 | 612,001 | 613,001 | 614,001 | 615,001 | 616,001 | 617,001 | 618,001 | 619,001 |
| 620,001 | 621,001 | 622,001 | 623,001 | 624,001 | 625,001 | 626,001 | 627,001 | 628,001 | 629,001 |
| 630,001 | 631,001 | 632,001 | 633,001 | 634,001 | 635,001 | 636,001 | 637,001 | 638,001 | 639,001 |
| 640,001 | 641,001 | 642,001 | 643,001 | 644,001 | 645,001 | 646,001 | 647,001 | 648,001 | 649,001 |
| 650,001 | 651,001 | 652,001 | 653,001 | 654,001 | 655,001 | 656,001 | 657,001 | 658,001 | 659,001 |
| 660,001 | 661,001 | 662,001 | 663,001 | 664,001 | 665,001 | 666,001 | 667,001 | 668,001 | 669,001 |
| 670,001 | 671,001 | 672,001 | 673,001 | 674,001 | 675,001 | 676,001 | 677,001 | 678,001 | 679,001 |
| 680,001 | 681,001 | 682,001 | 683,001 | 684,001 | 685,001 | 686,001 | 687,001 | 688,001 | 689,001 |
| 690,001 | 691,001 | 692,001 | 693,001 | 694,001 | 695,001 | 696,001 | 697,001 | 698,001 | 699,001 |

=== Numberings 700,001–800,000 ===
| 700,001 | 701,001 | 702,001 | 703,001 | 704,001 | 705,001 | 706,001 | 707,001 | 708,001 | 709,001 |
| 710,001 | 711,001 | 712,001 | 713,001 | 714,001 | 715,001 | 716,001 | 717,001 | 718,001 | 719,001 |
| 720,001 | 721,001 | 722,001 | 723,001 | 724,001 | 725,001 | 726,001 | 727,001 | 728,001 | 729,001 |
| 730,001 | 731,001 | 732,001 | 733,001 | 734,001 | 735,001 | 736,001 | 737,001 | 738,001 | 739,001 |
| 740,001 | 741,001 | 742,001 | 743,001 | 744,001 | 745,001 | 746,001 | 747,001 | 748,001 | 749,001 |
| 750,001 | 751,001 | 752,001 | 753,001 | 754,001 | 755,001 | 756,001 | 757,001 | 758,001 | 759,001 |
| 760,001 | 761,001 | 762,001 | 763,001 | 764,001 | 765,001 | 766,001 | 767,001 | 768,001 | 769,001 |
| 770,001 | 771,001 | 772,001 | 773,001 | 774,001 | 775,001 | 776,001 | 777,001 | 778,001 | 779,001 |
| 780,001 | 781,001 | 782,001 | 783,001 | 784,001 | 785,001 | 786,001 | 787,001 | 788,001 | 789,001 |
| 790,001 | 791,001 | 792,001 | 793,001 | 794,001 | 795,001 | 796,001 | 797,001 | 798,001 | 799,001 |

=== Numberings 800,001–900,000 ===
| 800,001 | 801,001 | 802,001 | 803,001 | 804,001 | 805,001 | 806,001 | 807,001 | 808,001 | 809,001 |
| 810,001 | 811,001 | 812,001 | 813,001 | 814,001 | 815,001 | 816,001 | 817,001 | 818,001 | 819,001 |
| 820,001 | 821,001 | 822,001 | 823,001 | 824,001 | 825,001 | 826,001 | 827,001 | 828,001 | 829,001 |
| 830,001 | 831,001 | 832,001 | 833,001 | 834,001 | 835,001 | 836,001 | 837,001 | 838,001 | 839,001 |
| 840,001 | 841,001 | 842,001 | 843,001 | 844,001 | 845,001 | 846,001 | 847,001 | 848,001 | 849,001 |
| 850,001 | 851,001 | 852,001 | 853,001 | 854,001 | 855,001 | 856,001 | 857,001 | 858,001 | 859,001 |
| 860,001 | 861,001 | 862,001 | 863,001 | 864,001 | 865,001 | 866,001 | 867,001 | 868,001 | 869,001 |
| 870,001 | 871,001 | 872,001 | 873,001 | 874,001 | 875,001 | 876,001 | 877,001 | 878,001 | 879,001 |
| 880,001 | 881,001 | 882,001 | 883,001 | 884,001 | 885,001 | 886,001 | 887,001 | 888,001 | 889,001 |
| 890,001 | 891,001 | 892,001 | 893,001 | 894,001 | 895,001 | 896,001 | 897,001 | 898,001 | 899,001 |

== Specific lists ==
Euler diagram showing the types of bodies in the Solar System (see Small Solar System body).

The following are lists of minor planets by physical properties, orbital properties, or discovery circumstances:

- List of exceptional asteroids (physical properties)
  - List of slow rotators (minor planets)
  - List of fast rotators (minor planets)
  - List of tumblers (small Solar System bodies)
- List of instrument-resolved minor planets
- List of Jupiter trojans (Greek camp)
- List of Jupiter trojans (Trojan camp)
- List of minor planets visited by spacecraft
- List of minor planet moons
- List of minor-planet groups
- List of named minor planets (alphabetical)
- List of named minor planets (numerical)
- List of possible dwarf planets
- List of centaurs (small Solar System bodies)
- List of trans-Neptunian objects
- List of unnumbered minor planets
  - List of unnumbered trans-Neptunian objects
- Meanings of minor planet names
  - List of minor planets named after people
  - List of minor planets named after places
  - List of minor planets named after rivers

== See also ==
- Lists of astronomical objects
- Binary asteroid
- Dwarf planets – top ten most likely: Pluto, Eris, Haumea, Makemake, Gonggong, Quaoar, Sedna, Ceres, Orcus, Salacia
- Kuiper belt (A major ring of bodies in the Solar System, around 30-60 AU and home to Pluto)
- Minor-planet moon
- Trans-Neptunian object

=== Other lists ===
- List of comets
- Planet § Objects formerly considered planets
