= 336 Lacadiera =

Main-belt asteroid

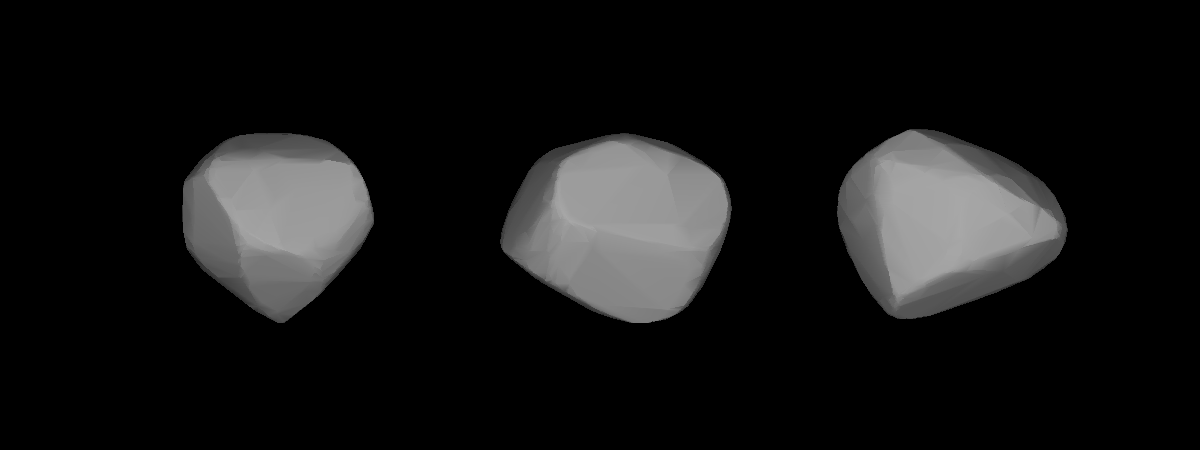
- A three-dimensional model of 336 Lacadiera based on its lightcurve

Discovery
- Discovered by: Auguste Charlois
- Discovery date: 19 September 1892

Designations
- Pronunciation: Occitan: [lakaˈdjeɾɔ]
- Named after: La Cadiera
- Alternative designations: 1892 D
- Minor planet category: Main belt

Orbital characteristics
- Epoch 31 July 2016 (JD 2457600.5)
- Uncertainty parameter 0
- Observation arc: 123.57 yr (45133 d)
- Aphelion: 2.4661 AU (368.92 Gm)
- Perihelion: 2.0373 AU (304.78 Gm)
- Semi-major axis: 2.2517 AU (336.85 Gm)
- Eccentricity: 0.095224
- Orbital period (sidereal): 3.38 yr (1234.2 d)
- Mean anomaly: 324.173°
- Mean motion: 0° 17^{m} 30.12^{s} / day
- Inclination: 5.6530°
- Longitude of ascending node: 235.044°
- Time of perihelion: 2023-Sep-03
- Argument of perihelion: 31.129°

Physical characteristics
- Dimensions: 69.31±2.4 km
- Synodic rotation period: 13.70 h (0.571 d)
- Geometric albedo: 0.0459±0.003
- Spectral type: D
- Absolute magnitude (H): 9.76

336 Lacadiera is a large Main belt asteroid. It is classified as a D-type asteroid and is probably composed of organic rich silicates, carbon and anhydrous silicates. The asteroid was discovered by Auguste Charlois on 19 September 1892 in Nice.

In 2000, the asteroid was detected by radar from the Arecibo Observatory at a distance of 1.21 AU. The resulting data yielded an effective diameter of 69 ± 9 km.
