= 20461 Dioretsa =

Centaur and damocloid

Discovery
- Discovered by: LINEAR
- Discovery site: Lincoln Lab ETS
- Discovery date: 8 June 1999

Designations
- Pronunciation: /daɪ.əˈrɛtsə/
- Named after: Asteroid (spelled backwards)
- Alternative designations: 1999 LD_{31}
- Minor planet category: centaur · damocloid unusual · distant
- Symbol: (astrological)

Orbital characteristics
- Epoch 27 April 2019 (JD 2458600.5)
- Uncertainty parameter 2
- Observation arc: 2.54 yr (927 d)
- Aphelion: 45.404 AU
- Perihelion: 2.4021 AU
- Semi-major axis: 23.903 AU
- Eccentricity: 0.8995
- Orbital period (sidereal): 116.87 yr (42,686 d)
- Mean anomaly: 59.873°
- Mean motion: 0° 0^{m} 30.24^{s} / day
- Inclination: 160.43°
- Longitude of ascending node: 297.77°
- Argument of perihelion: 103.13°
- Jupiter MOID: 0.1907 AU
- T_{Jupiter}: -1.5470

Physical characteristics
- Mean diameter: 14±3 km
- Geometric albedo: 0.03±0.01
- Absolute magnitude (H): 13.8

20461 Dioretsa /daɪ.əˈrɛtsə/ is a centaur and damocloid on a retrograde, cometary-like orbit from the outer Solar System. It was discovered on 8 June 1999, by members of the LINEAR team at the Lincoln Laboratory Experimental Test Site near Socorro, New Mexico, United States. The highly eccentric unusual object measures approximately 14 kilometers (8.7 miles) in diameter. It was named dioretsa, an anadrome of "asteroid".

== Classification and orbit ==
Dioretsa is a member of the damocloids, with a retrograde orbit and a negative T_{Jupiter} of −1.547. It is also a centaur, as its orbit has a semi-major axis in between that of Jupiter (5.5 AU) Neptune (30.1 AU). The Minor Planet Center lists it as a critical object and (other) unusual minor planet due to an orbital eccentricity of more than 0.5.

It orbits the Sun at a distance of 2.4–45.4 AU once every 116 years and 10 months (42,686 days; semi-major axis of 23.9 AU). Its orbit has an eccentricity of 0.90 and an inclination of 160° with respect to the ecliptic. Its observation arc begins 12 months prior to its official discovery observation, with a precovery image taken by Spacewatch at Steward Observatory in June 1998. As of 2021, it was last observed in 2000 and its orbit still has an uncertainty of 2.

=== Retrograde orbit ===
Dioretsa is the first distant object with a retrograde orbit to be discovered, with 1999 LE31. An inclination of greater than 90° means that a body moves in a retrograde orbit. Dioretsa's orbit is otherwise similar to that of a comet. This has led to speculation that Dioretsa was originally an object from the Oort cloud.

== Naming ==
The minor planet's name "Dioretsa" is the word "asteroid" spelled backwards (an anadrome), and is the first numbered of currently 136 known (see Data Base Search of the Minor Planet Center) minor planets with a retrograde motion in the Solar System. The approved naming citation was published by the Minor Planet Center on 1 May 2003 (M.P.C. 48396).

== Physical characteristics ==
According to observations made with the 10-meter Keck Telescope, Dioretsa measures 14 kilometers in diameter and its surface has a low albedo of 0.03. It has an absolute magnitude of 13.8. As of 2018, Dioretsa's spectral type as well as its rotation period and shape remain unknown.
