= 2483 Guinevere =

Hilda asteroid

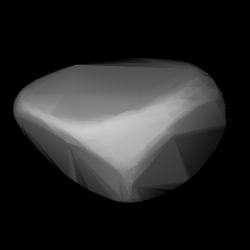
- Shape model of Guinevere from its lightcurve

Discovery
- Discovered by: M. F. Wolf
- Discovery site: Heidelberg Obs.
- Discovery date: 17 August 1928

Designations
- Pronunciation: /ˈɡwɪnɪvɪər/
- Named after: Guinevere (Arthurian legend)
- Alternative designations: 1928 QB · 1929 VR; 1955 FZ_{1} · 1961 VM; 1961 XR · 1971 BM; 1971 FN · 1977 XL; A921 WF
- Minor planet category: main-belt · (outer); Hilda

Orbital characteristics
- Epoch 4 September 2017 (JD 2458000.5)
- Uncertainty parameter 0
- Observation arc: 88.51 yr (32,327 days)
- Aphelion: 5.0733 AU
- Perihelion: 2.8687 AU
- Semi-major axis: 3.9710 AU
- Eccentricity: 0.2776
- Orbital period (sidereal): 7.91 yr (2,890 days)
- Mean anomaly: 4.7663°
- Mean motion: 0° 7^{m} 28.56^{s} / day
- Inclination: 4.5000°
- Longitude of ascending node: 252.04°
- Argument of perihelion: 183.36°
- Jupiter MOID: 0.2309 AU

Physical characteristics
- Mean diameter: 35.687±0.180 km 42.42±2.89 km 44.14 km (derived); 44.17±3.9 km
- Synodic rotation period: 14.730±0.002 h (Note: Lightcurve plot of (2483) Guinevere by B.D. Warner, CS-Palmer Divide Station (October 2016), with a rotation period of 14.730±0.002 hours and a brightness amplitude of 0.089 mag (Quality Code: 3-). Summary figures at Collaborative Asteroid Lightcurve Link (CALL)); 14.73081±0.00001 h 14.733 h
- Geometric albedo: 0.0396 (derived); 0.0433±0.009; 0.048±0.007; 0.067±0.011
- Spectral type: C
- Absolute magnitude (H): 10.8 · 10.9

2483 Guinevere /ˈɡwɪnɪvɪər/ is a dark and elongated Hilda asteroid from the outermost regions of the asteroid belt, approximately 43 kilometers (27 miles) in diameter. The asteroid was discovered on 17 August 1928, by German astronomer Max Wolf at Heidelberg Observatory in southwest Germany and given the provisional designation 1928 QB. In the 1980s, it was named after Queen Guinevere.

== Classification and orbit ==
=== Hildian asteroid ===
Located in the outermost part of the main-belt, Guinevere is a member of the Hilda family, a large group of asteroids that are thought to have originated from the Kuiper belt. They orbit in a 3:2 orbital resonance with the gas giant Jupiter, meaning that for every 2 orbits Jupiter completes around the Sun, a Hildian asteroid will complete 3 orbits. Based on a numerical integration, Guinevere is the Hilda asteroid with the greatest chance of impacting with another asteroid. About 74% of the impact risk occurs when Guinevere is relatively close to perihelion and approaches the main-belt asteroids.

=== Orbit ===
Guinevere orbits the Sun at a distance of 2.9–5.1 AU once every 7 years and 11 months (2,890 days). Its orbit has an eccentricity of 0.28 and an inclination of 5° with respect to the ecliptic. In November 1921, it was first identified as A921 WF at Bergedorf Observatory in Hamburg, Germany. The body's observation arc begins two nights after its official discovery observation at Heidelberg in August 1928.

== Naming ==
This minor planet was named after Guinevere, the wife of King Arthur and the lover of Lancelot in Arthurian legend, after whom the minor planets (2041) and (2597) are named. This affair lead to civil war between King Arthur and his chief knight, who rescued Guinevere from burning at the stake, and initiated the downfall of Arthur's idyllic kingdom. The name was suggested by Frederick Pilcher and the proposal was submitted by Edward Bowell, who also made the object's key identification. The approved naming citation was published by the Minor Planet Center on 24 July 1983 (M.P.C. 8064).

== Physical characteristics ==
=== Lightcurves ===
During a survey of Hilda asteroids in the 1990s, a rotational lightcurve of Guinevere was obtained from photometric observations by an international collaboration of Swedish, German and Italian astronomers. Lightcurve analysis gave a well-defined rotation period of 14.733 hours with a brightness variation of 1.38 magnitude (U=3). Guinevere is a high-amplitude Hilda. A high brightness amplitude typically indicates that the body is elongated and has a non-spheroidal shape. Thermal emission measurements from the Wide-field Infrared Survey Explorer (WISE) gave an even higher amplitude of 1.53 magnitude. In October 2016, another lightcurve of Guinevere was obtained at the Center for Solar System Studies (CS3), Landers, in the Southern California desert, during a photometric survey conducted by American astronomers Dan Coley, Robert Stephens and Brian Warner (U80–U82). It showed a period of 14.730 hours with an amplitude of 0.89 magnitude (U=3-).

A 2016-published lightcurve, using modeled photometric data from the Lowell Photometric Database (LPD), gave a concurring period of 14.73081 hours (U=n.a.), as well as two spin axis of (19.0°, 70.0°) and (194.0°, 59.0°) in ecliptic coordinates (λ, β).

=== Diameter and albedo ===
According to the surveys carried out by the Infrared Astronomical Satellite IRAS, the Japanese Akari satellite, and the NEOWISE mission of NASA's WISE spacecraft, Guinevere measures between 35.687 and 44.17 kilometers in diameter and its surface has an albedo between 0.0433 and 0.067. The Collaborative Asteroid Lightcurve Link agrees with IRAS and derives an albedo of 0.0396 and a diameter of 44.14 kilometers based on an absolute magnitude of 10.9.
