= 8373 Stephengould =

Main-belt asteroid

Discovery
- Discovered by: Carolyn S. Shoemaker; Eugene Merle Shoemaker
- Discovery site: Palomar
- Discovery date: 1 January 1992

Designations
- Named after: Stephen Jay Gould
- Alternative designations: 1992 AB
- Minor planet category: main-belt; (outer); 2:1 res.

Orbital characteristics
- Epoch 13 January 2016 (JD 2457400.5)
- Uncertainty parameter 0
- Observation arc: 8844 days (24.21 yr)
- Aphelion: 5.09996 AU (762.943 Gm)
- Perihelion: 1.45970 AU (218.368 Gm)
- Semi-major axis: 3.27983 AU (490.656 Gm)
- Eccentricity: 0.554947
- Orbital period (sidereal): 5.94 yr (2169.6 d)
- Mean anomaly: 358.004°
- Mean motion: 0° 9^{m} 57.352^{s} / day
- Inclination: 40.7923°
- Longitude of ascending node: 88.8722°
- Argument of perihelion: 55.5019°
- Known satellites: 1
- Jupiter MOID: 1.4741 AU (220.52 Gm)
- T_{Jupiter}: 2.587

Physical characteristics
- Synodic rotation period: 4.435 h (0.1848 d)
- Absolute magnitude (H): 14.0

8373 Stephengould (1992 AB) is an outer main-belt binary asteroid discovered on 1 January 1992 by Carolyn S. Shoemaker and Eugene Merle Shoemaker at Palomar Observatory. The asteroid was named after the Harvard paleontologist Stephen Jay Gould. The asteroid has a very high inclination, having the second highest inclination of any of the first 10,000 discovered asteroids in the asteroid belt, after 2938 Hopi.

Stephengould is one of few strongly unstable asteroids located near the 2:1 mean motion resonance with the gas giant Jupiter, that corresponds to one of the prominent Kirkwood gaps in the asteroid belt.

The asteroid has a moon orbiting it, discovered in 2010 with an orbital period of 1 day, 10 hours, and 9 minutes.

== See also ==
- List of minor planets
