= 1941 Wild =

Hilda asteroid

Discovery
- Discovered by: K. Reinmuth
- Discovery site: Heidelberg Obs.
- Discovery date: 6 October 1931

Designations
- Named after: Paul Wild (Swiss astronomer)
- Alternative designations: 1931 TN_{1} · 1971 SO_{1} A915 UA
- Minor planet category: main-belt · Hilda; Schubart

Orbital characteristics
- Epoch 4 September 2017 (JD 2458000.5)
- Uncertainty parameter 0
- Observation arc: 101.55 yr (37,090 days)
- Aphelion: 5.0926 AU
- Perihelion: 2.8115 AU
- Semi-major axis: 3.9520 AU
- Eccentricity: 0.2886
- Orbital period (sidereal): 7.86 yr (2,870 days)
- Mean anomaly: 288.25°
- Mean motion: 0° 7^{m} 31.8^{s} / day
- Inclination: 3.9587°
- Longitude of ascending node: 60.454°
- Argument of perihelion: 302.70°
- Jupiter MOID: 0.4044 AU
- T_{Jupiter}: 2.9810

Physical characteristics
- Dimensions: 17.120±0.122 km 24.30 km (calculated)
- Synodic rotation period: 9.05 h 45.6488±0.1783 h
- Geometric albedo: 0.057 (assumed); 0.152±0.032
- Spectral type: M · C
- Absolute magnitude (H): 11.8 · 11.83±0.38 · 12.139±0.002 (S)

1941 Wild, provisional designation 1931 TN_{1}, is an eccentric Hildian asteroid from the outermost region of the asteroid belt, approximately 20 kilometers in diameter.

It was discovered on 6 October 1931, by German astronomer Karl Reinmuth at Heidelberg Observatory in southern Germany. The asteroid was named for Swiss astronomer Paul Wild.

== Orbit and classification ==
Wild is a member of the Hilda family, a large group of asteroids that are thought to have originated from the Kuiper belt. Located in the outermost part of the main-belt, they orbit in a 3:2 orbital resonance with the gas giant Jupiter, meaning that for every 2 orbits Jupiter completes around the Sun, a Hildian asteroid will complete 3 orbits. As the Hildas neither cross the path of any of the planets nor can they be pulled out of orbit by Jupiter's gravitational field due to their resonance, it is likely that the asteroid will remain in a stable orbit for thousands of years.

The asteroid orbits the Sun in the outer main-belt at a distance of 2.8–5.1 AU once every 7 years and 10 months (2,870 days). Its orbit has an eccentricity of 0.29 and an inclination of 4° with respect to the ecliptic. Wild's observation arc begins with its discovery observation, as A915 UA, a previous identification made at Heidelberg in 1918, remained unused.

== Physical characteristics ==
According to the survey on the Hilda Population carried out by the Wide-field Infrared Survey Explorer (WISE) with its subsequent NEOWISE mission, Wild measures 17.2 kilometers in diameter, and its surface has an albedo of 0.152, while the Collaborative Asteroid Lightcurve Link assumes a standard albedo for carbonaceous asteroids 0.057, and calculates a diameter of 24.3 kilometers with an absolute magnitude of 11.8. WISE also classifies the carbonaceous asteroid as a metallic M-type.

A rotational lightcurve of Wild was obtained by Richard P. Binzel in October 1987. It gave a rotation period of 9.05 hours with a brightness variation of 0.36 magnitude (U=2). A longer period of 45.6 hours was derived from photometric observations at the Palomar Transient Factory in September 2011 (U=1)

== Naming ==
This minor planet was named in honor of Swiss astronomer Paul Wild (1925–2014), who worked at the Astronomical Institute of the University of Bern. Wild's research focused on the discovery and observation of supernovae in other galaxies. He was also a prolific discoverer of minor planets and comets, most notably of comet Wild 2, which he discovered at the university's nearby Zimmerwald Observatory, and which was later visited by NASA's Stardust Mission. The official naming citation was published by the Minor Planet Center on 20 February 1976 (M.P.C. 3938).
