= Jiro Kondo =

Japanese Egyptologist

Jiro Kondo (近藤 二郎, Kondō Jirō; born 2 December 1951) is a Japanese Egyptologist, and has worked in tombs KVA and KV22 in the Valley of the Kings and with ARTP. He is a Professor of Archaeology at Waseda University, Tokyo.

== Bibliography ==
- Shin-ichi Nishimoto, Sakuji Yoshimura, and Jiro Kondo, [https://web.archive.org/web/20110602081242/http://www.britishmuseum.org/pdf/1c%20Hieratic%20Inscriptions.pdf British Museum Studies in Ancient Egypt and Sudan/BMSEAS 1 (2001), pp.20-31
