= 4446 Carolyn =

Hildian asteroid

Discovery
- Discovered by: E. Bowell
- Discovery site: Anderson Mesa Stn.
- Discovery date: 15 October 1985

Designations
- Named after: Carolyn Shoemaker (American astronomer)
- Alternative designations: 1985 TT · 1977 RC_{6}
- Minor planet category: main-belt · (outer); Hilda · background

Orbital characteristics
- Epoch 23 March 2018 (JD 2458200.5)
- Uncertainty parameter 0
- Observation arc: 40.47 yr (14,780 d)
- Aphelion: 5.1111 AU
- Perihelion: 2.8696 AU
- Semi-major axis: 3.9903 AU
- Eccentricity: 0.2809
- Orbital period (sidereal): 7.97 yr (2,911 d)
- Mean anomaly: 76.416°
- Mean motion: 0° 7^{m} 24.96^{s} / day
- Inclination: 7.2387°
- Longitude of ascending node: 189.03°
- Argument of perihelion: 117.01°
- Jupiter MOID: 0.6421 AU
- T_{Jupiter}: 2.9720

Physical characteristics
- Mean diameter: 28.645±0.290 km 31.57±1.44 km 32.03 km (calculated)
- Synodic rotation period: 40.92±0.01 h (Note: Lightcurve plot of (4446) Carolyn with a rotation period 40.92±0.02 hours with a brightness amplitude of 0.22 mag. Quality code of 3. Data points: 770. Observers: B. D. Warner, R. D. Stephens and D. A. Coley. Summary figures at the LCDB and CS3)
- Geometric albedo: 0.057 (assumed); 0.075±0.008; 0.086±0.026
- Spectral type: C (assumed)
- Absolute magnitude (H): 11.10 · 11.12±0.41; 11.2

4446 Carolyn, provisional designation 1985 TT, is a dark Hildian asteroid from the outermost regions of the asteroid belt, approximately 30 kilometers (19 miles) in diameter. It was discovered on 15 October 1985, by American astronomer Edward Bowell at the Anderson Mesa Station of the Lowell Observatory near Flagstaff, Arizona, in the United States. The asteroid was named after American astronomer Carolyn Shoemaker. It has a longer than average rotation period of 40.9 hours.

== Orbit and classification ==
Carolyn is a member of the dynamical Hilda group of asteroids. However, it is not a member of any asteroid family but an asteroid of the main-belt's background population when applying the hierarchical clustering method to its proper orbital elements. It orbits the Sun in the outermost asteroid belt at a distance of 2.9–5.1 AU once every 8 years (2,911 days; semi-major axis of 3.99 AU). Its orbit has an eccentricity of 0.28 and an inclination of 7° with respect to the ecliptic.

The body's observation arc begins with its first observations as 1977 RC_{6} at Crimea–Nauchnij in September 1977, or 8 years prior to its official discovery observation at Anderson Mesa.

== Physical characteristics ==
Carolyn is an assumed carbonaceous C-type asteroid.

=== Rotation period ===
In July 2016, a first rotational lightcurve of Carolyn was obtained from photometric observations by astronomers Brian Warner, Robert Stephens and Dan Coley at the Center for Solar System Studies in California. Lightcurve analysis gave a well-defined rotation period of 40.92 hours with a brightness amplitude of 0.22 magnitude (U=3). While not being a slow rotator, its period is significantly longer than the typical 2 to 20 hours measured for most asteroids.

=== Diameter and albedo ===
According to the surveys carried out by the Japanese Akari satellite and the NEOWISE mission of NASA's Wide-field Infrared Survey Explorer, Carolyn measures 28.645 and 31.57 kilometers in diameter and its surface has an albedo of 0.086 and 0.075, respectively.

The Collaborative Asteroid Lightcurve Link assumes a standard albedo for carbonaceous asteroids of 0.057 and calculates a diameter of 32.03 kilometers based on an absolute magnitude of 11.2.

== Naming ==
This minor planet was named by the discoverer after American astronomer Carolyn Shoemaker (born 1929), a prolific discoverer of minor planets and comets, such as Comet Shoemaker–Levy 9. Many of her discoveries were co-discoveries with her husband Gene Shoemaker. The official naming citation was prepared by David Levy and Jean Mueller, and published by the Minor Planet Center on 27 June 1991 (M.P.C. 18458).
