= 514107 Kaʻepaokaʻāwela =

Retrograde asteroid discovered in 2014

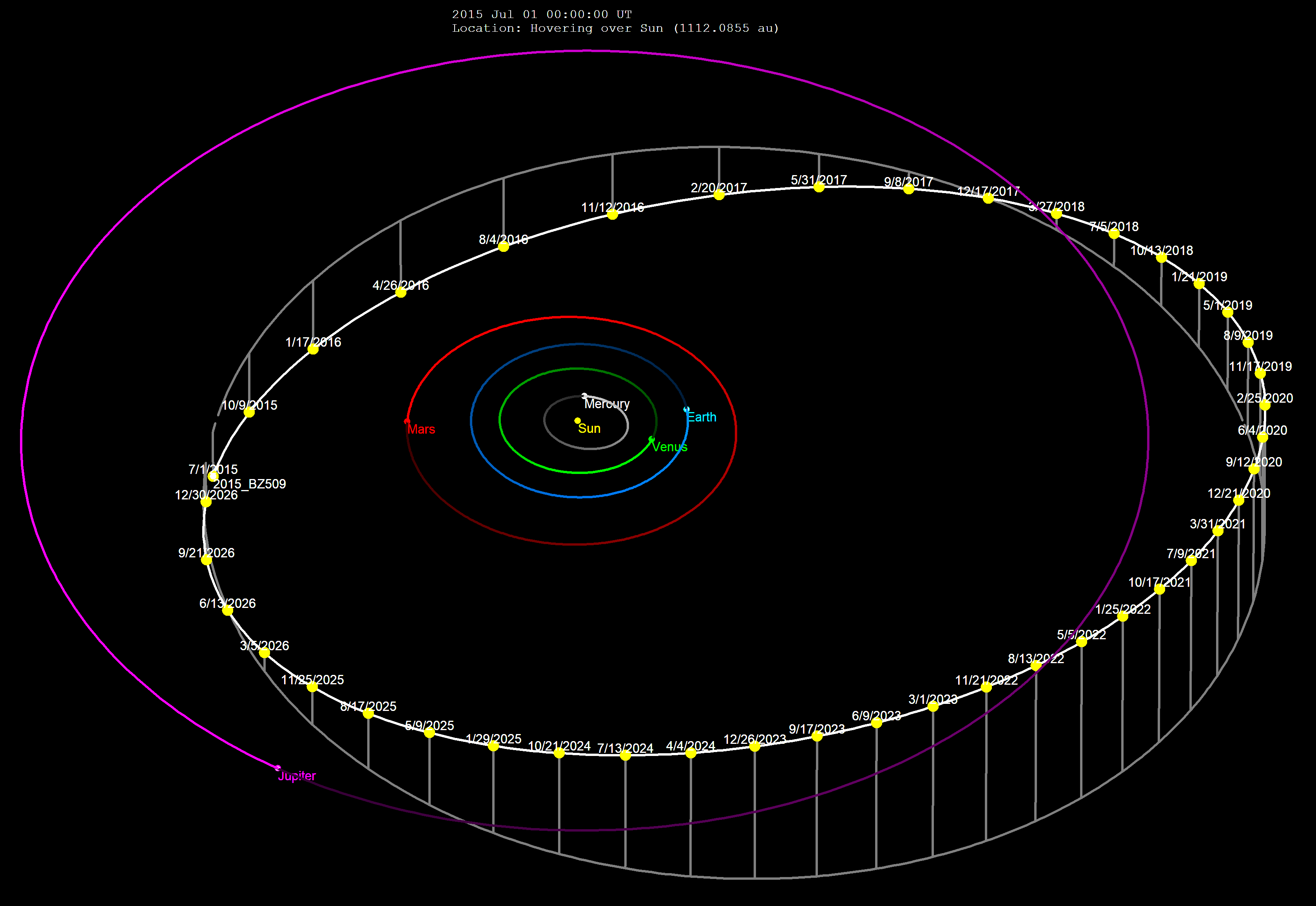
- Retrograde orbit of Kaʻepaokaʻāwela with 100-day motion markers

Discovery
- Discovered by: Pan-STARRS 1
- Discovery site: Haleakala Obs.
- Discovery date: 26 November 2014

Designations
- Pronunciation: /kəˌɛpə.oʊkə.ɑːˈvɛlə/ Hawaiian: [kəˈʔɛpə.oˌkəʔaːˈvɛlə]
- Named after: Kaʻepaokaʻāwela ("the Jupiter trickster")
- Alternative designations: 2015 BZ_{509} Bee-Zed (nickname)
- Minor planet category: retrograde Jupiter co-orbital asteroid · unusual

Orbital characteristics
- Epoch 27 April 2019 (JD 2458600.5)
- Uncertainty parameter 2
- Observation arc: 2.81 yr (1,026 d)
- Aphelion: 7.0899 AU
- Perihelion: 3.1889 AU
- Semi-major axis: 5.1394 AU
- Eccentricity: 0.3795
- Orbital period (sidereal): 11.65 yr (4,256 d)
- Mean anomaly: 100.26°
- Mean motion: 0° 5^{m} 4.56^{s} / day
- Inclination: 163.02°
- Longitude of ascending node: 307.42°
- Argument of perihelion: 257.48°
- Jupiter MOID: 0.2252 AU
- T_{Jupiter}: -0.7460

Physical characteristics
- Mean diameter: 3 km (approx.)
- Absolute magnitude (H): 16.0

514107 Kaʻepaokaʻāwela (/kəˌʔɛpə.oʊkə.ʔɑːˈvɛlə/), provisionally designated 2015 BZ_{509} and nicknamed Bee-Zed, is a small asteroid, approximately 3 km (2 mi) in diameter, in a resonant, co-orbital motion with Jupiter. It is an unusual minor planet in that its orbit is retrograde, that is, opposite to the direction of most other bodies in the Solar System. It was discovered on 26 November 2014, by astronomers of the Pan-STARRS survey at Haleakala Observatory on the island of Maui, United States. Kaʻepaokaʻāwela is the first example of an asteroid with a retrograde orbit that is also in a stable 1:–1 resonance with any of the planets at the same time. This type of resonance had only been studied a few years before the object's discovery. One study suggests that it was an interstellar asteroid captured 4.5 billion years ago into an orbit around the Sun.

== Nomenclature ==
The Hawaiian name Kaʻepaokaʻāwela ([kəˈʔɛpəokəʔaːˈvɛlə]) is composed of ka 'the'; ʻepa 'tricky' or 'mischievous', referring to its contrary orbit; o 'of'; and Kaʻāwela 'Jupiter'. The name was created by A Hua He Inoa, a Hawaiian-language program dedicated to naming objects discovered with Pan-STARRS. The A Hua He Inoa program consists of Hawaiian language experts and astronomers at the ʻImiloa Astronomy Center. Their submitted name was approved by the International Astronomical Union on 6 April 2019. Prior to the naming of Kaʻepaokaʻāwela, it was given the provisional designation 2015 BZ_{509} during 16–31 January 2015, for being the 12,750th object first observed in that period. It was then numbered 514107 and added to the minor planet catalog by the Minor Planet Center on 2 March 2018 (M.P.C. 109159), after its orbit became sufficiently determined.

== Orbit ==
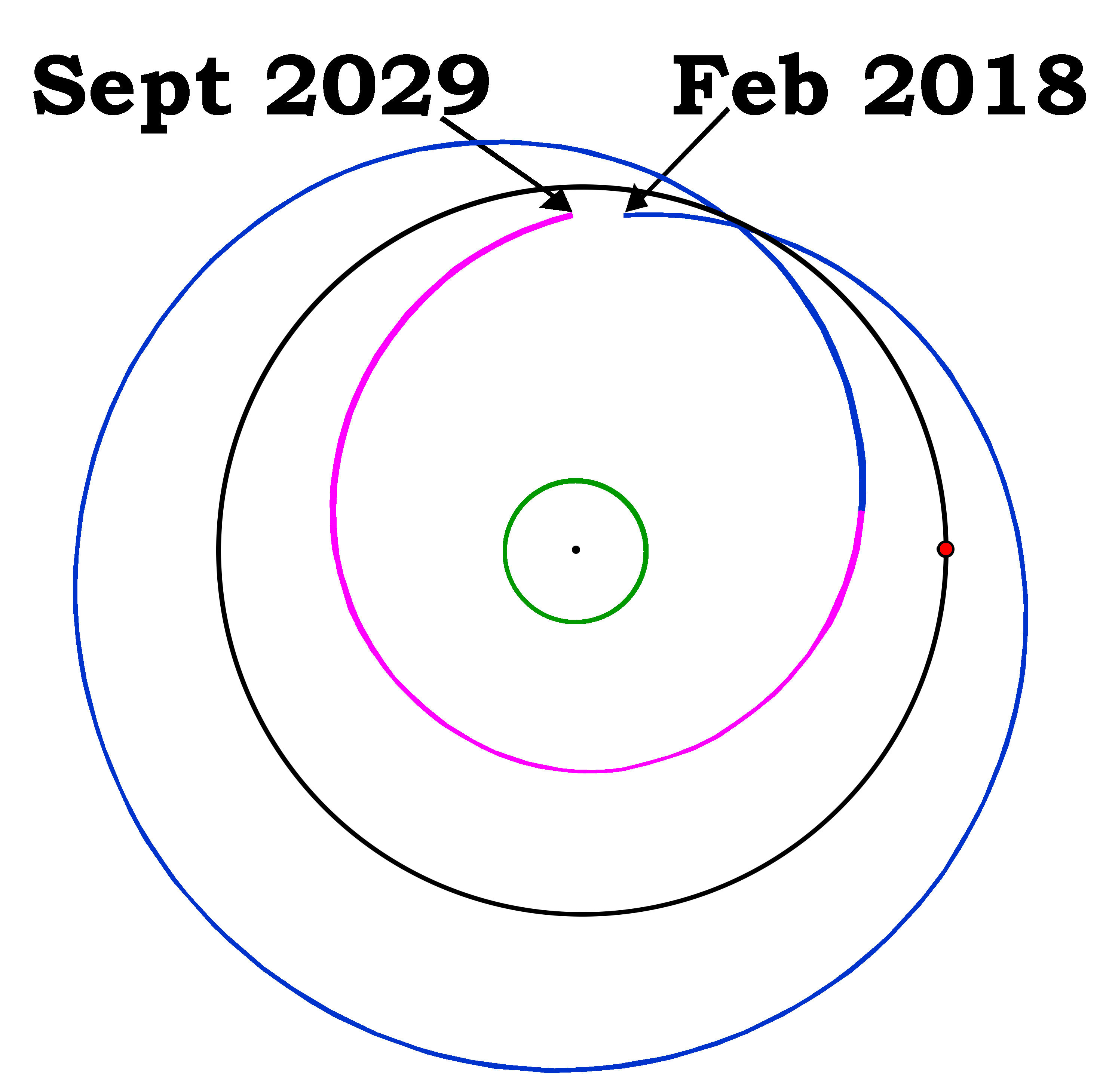
Orbital diagram

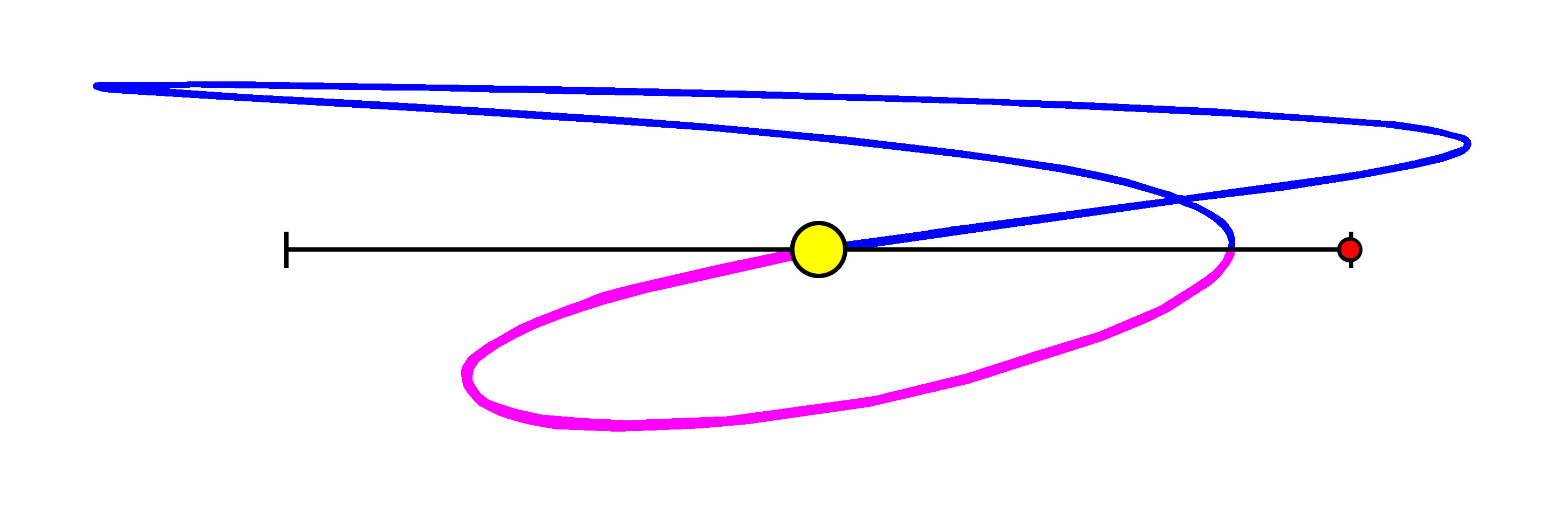
Orbit (side-view) compared to Jupiter

Kaʻepaokaʻāwela orbits the Sun at a distance of 3.2–7.1 AU once every 11 years and 8 months (4,256 days; semi-major axis of 5.14 AU). Its orbit has an eccentricity of 0.38 and an inclination of 163° with respect to the ecliptic.

Its period is close to the 11.86-year period of Jupiter. During one Jovian year, Jupiter moves 360° around the sun whereas Kaʻepaokaʻāwela moves 366.3° in the opposite direction. The eccentricity of its orbit allows it to alternately pass inside and outside of Jupiter's orbit at its closest approaches of 176 million kilometers. Each time it passes near Jupiter its orbital elements, including its period, are slightly altered. Over thousands of years the angle between the position of the asteroid and its perihelion minus the angle between Jupiter and the asteroid's perihelion tends to oscillate around zero with a period of about 660 years and an amplitude of about 125°, although sometimes this difference slips by a whole 360°. (Note: See Figure 2 of Wiegert, Connors & Veillet 2017.)

The adjunct diagram shows one complete orbit of Kaʻepaokaʻāwela in a frame of reference rotating with Jupiter. The view is from the north looking south onto the Solar System. The dot in the middle is the Sun and the green circle is the orbit of Earth. The black circle shows the size of the orbit of Jupiter but in this frame of reference Jupiter (the red dot) stays almost stationary at the point on the circle directly to the right of the sun. The orbit of this asteroid is shown in blue when it is above the plane of the orbit of Jupiter, and in magenta when it is below the plane of the orbit of Jupiter.

The second diagram shows one complete orbit of Kaʻepaokaʻāwela in a frame of reference rotating with Jupiter. The view is from the side looking into the Solar System. The Sun is the yellow disk in the middle. The plane of the orbit of Jupiter is shown in black, but in this frame of reference Jupiter (the red dot) stays at the right end of the black line. The orbit of this asteroid is shown in blue when it is above (north of) the plane of the orbit of Jupiter, and it is shown in magenta when it is below (south of) the plane of the orbit of Jupiter.

Perturbations from Jupiter alone would maintain the co-orbital configuration indefinitely. Simulations including also the perturbations from the other planets show that it has been in its co-orbital relation with Jupiter for at least a million years and will continue for at least another million years. It is somewhat of a mystery how this asteroid (or comet) got into this orbit, but it is thought that at some time in the distant past it was put into an orbit resembling its present orbit by an interaction with Saturn, and then its orbit was perturbed into the state it is in today. Likewise, in the far future it may eventually get close enough to Saturn to be expelled from its present co-orbital relation with Jupiter.

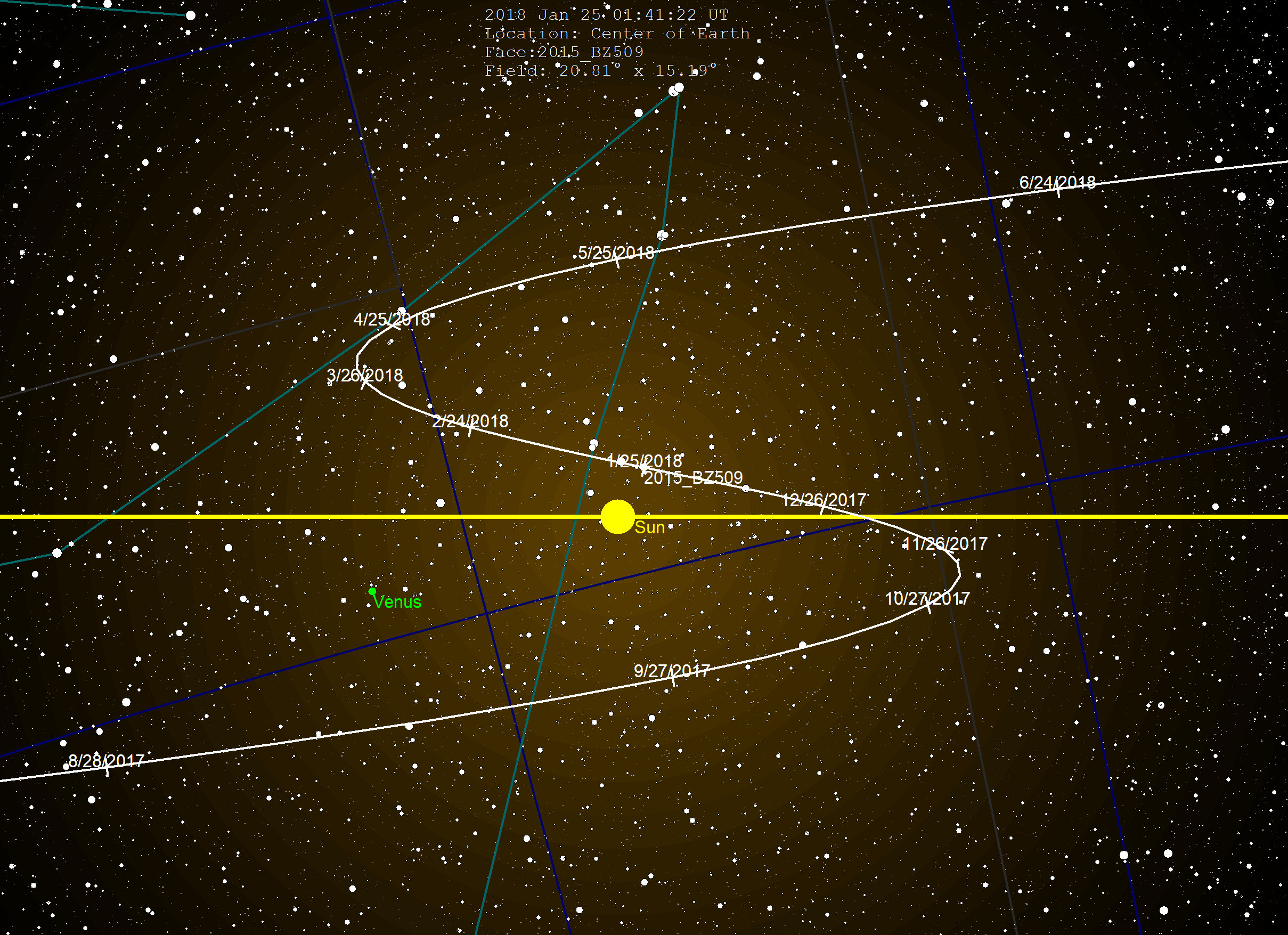
Kaʻepaokaʻāwela shows apparent retrograde motion in the sky while it is on the far side of the sun, rather than at opposition with the sun.

== Possible interstellar origin ==
A statistical search for stable orbits by Fathi Namouni and Helena Morais using one million objects with similar orbits to that of Kaʻepaokaʻāwela identified 27 that were stable for 4.5 billion years, the lifetime of the Solar System. Using this result they concluded that Kaʻepaokaʻāwela has been in its retrograde resonance with Jupiter since the origin of the Solar System instead of it being an object that is only briefly in this orbit that was observed by chance using the Copernican principle. Since its retrograde orbit is in the opposite direction as objects that formed in the early Solar System they posit that Kaʻepaokaʻāwela has an interstellar origin. If confirmed, this origin would have implications on current theories such as the detailed timing and mechanics of planet formation, and the delivery of water and organic molecules to Earth.

Others suggest that Kaʻepaokaʻāwela originated in the Oort cloud or that it acquired a retrograde orbit due to interactions with Planet Nine, and that it is a short term resident of its current resonance. Given the small fraction of objects with orbits like Kaʻepaokaʻāwela that survive for the life of the Solar System, they find that a primordial population of similar objects must have been an implausible ten times as large as the current asteroid belt if it was an interstellar object captured during the formation of the Solar System. Another potential source of retrograde Jupiter trojans are escaping near-Earth asteroids.

== See also ==
- List of exceptional asteroids § Retrograde
- ʻOumuamua, an interstellar object
