= 2959 Scholl =

Hildian asteroid

Discovery
- Discovered by: E. Bowell
- Discovery site: Anderson Mesa Stn.
- Discovery date: 4 September 1983

Designations
- Named after: Hans Scholl (German astronomer)
- Alternative designations: 1983 RE_{2} · 1968 UB_{3} 1977 UK · 1978 EY_{1}
- Minor planet category: main-belt · (outer); Hilda

Orbital characteristics
- Epoch 4 September 2017 (JD 2458000.5)
- Uncertainty parameter 0
- Observation arc: 48.53 yr (17,727 days)
- Aphelion: 5.0276 AU
- Perihelion: 2.8597 AU
- Semi-major axis: 3.9436 AU
- Eccentricity: 0.2749
- Orbital period (sidereal): 7.83 yr (2,861 days)
- Mean anomaly: 79.809°
- Mean motion: 0° 7^{m} 33.24^{s} / day
- Inclination: 5.2330°
- Longitude of ascending node: 121.24°
- Argument of perihelion: 285.08°
- Jupiter MOID: 0.5192 AU

Physical characteristics
- Dimensions: 32.783±0.319 km 34.11±1.9 km 34.15 km (derived); 35.70±0.77 km 45.60±15.37 km
- Synodic rotation period: 16 h
- Geometric albedo: 0.04±0.04; 0.049±0.002; 0.0503±0.006; 0.054±0.015; 0.055 (derived)
- Spectral type: C
- Absolute magnitude (H): 11.00 · 11.1 · 11.84±0.25 · 11.2

2959 Scholl, provisional designation 1983 RE_{2}, is a carbonaceous Hildian asteroid from the outer regions of the asteroid belt, approximately 34 kilometers in diameter. It was discovered on 4 September 1983 by English-American astronomer Edward Bowell of the Lowell Observatory at Anderson Mesa Station near Flagstaff, Arizona. The asteroid was named after German astronomer Hans Scholl.

== Orbit and classification ==
Scholl is a member of the Hilda family, a large group that orbits in resonance with the gas giant Jupiter and are thought to originate from the Kuiper belt. Scholl orbits the Sun at a distance of 2.9–5.0 AU once every 7 years and 10 months (2,861 days). Its orbit has an eccentricity of 0.27 and an inclination of 5° with respect to the ecliptic. On 23 October 1963, the asteroid was first identified as 1968 UB_{3} at Crimea–Nauchnij, extending the body's observation arc by 20 years prior to its official discovery observation at Flagstaff.

== Physical characteristics ==
Scholl is an assumed carbonaceous C-type asteroid.

=== Rotation period ===
A rotational lightcurve of Scholl was obtained from photometric observations by Swedish, Spanish, Italian and German astronomers. Published in 1998, the fragmentary lightcurve gave a rotation period of 16 hours with a brightness amplitude of 0.14 magnitude (U=1).

=== Diameter and albedo ===
According to the surveys carried out by the Infrared Astronomical Satellite IRAS, the Japanese Akari satellite, and the NEOWISE mission of NASA's Wide-field Infrared Survey Explorer, Scholl measures between 32.783 and 45.60 kilometers in diameter and its surface has an albedo between 0.04 and 0.054.

The Collaborative Asteroid Lightcurve Link derives an albedo of 0.055 and a diameter of 34.15 kilometers based on an absolute magnitude of 11.1.

== Naming ==
This minor planet was named in honor of German astronomer Hans Scholl (born 1942), who worked at the Astronomical Calculation Institute, Heidelberg, and Côte d'Azur Observatory in Nice, France. He is a co-discoverer of many minor planets and three moons of Uranus.

The official naming citation was published by the Minor Planet Center on 15 May 1984 (M.P.C. 8802).
