= 2311 El Leoncito =

Reddish main-belt asteroid

Discovery
- Discovered by: Félix Aguilar Obs.
- Discovery site: El Leoncito
- Discovery date: 10 October 1974

Designations
- Named after: El Leoncito (observatories)
- Alternative designations: 1974 TA_{1} · 1928 DM; 1944 KD · 1972 KH; 1972 LM · 1976 AE
- Minor planet category: main-belt · (outer)

Orbital characteristics
- Epoch 4 September 2017 (JD 2458000.5)
- Uncertainty parameter 0
- Observation arc: 44.87 yr (16,387 days)
- Aphelion: 3.7866 AU
- Perihelion: 3.4866 AU
- Semi-major axis: 3.6366 AU
- Eccentricity: 0.0412
- Orbital period (sidereal): 6.94 yr (2,533 days)
- Mean anomaly: 107.06°
- Mean motion: 0° 8^{m} 31.56^{s} / day
- Inclination: 6.6174°
- Longitude of ascending node: 156.68°
- Argument of perihelion: 189.64°

Physical characteristics
- Dimensions: 53.1±3 km (IRAS:10)
- Geometric albedo: 0.0388±0.005 (IRAS:10)
- Spectral type: Tholen = D B–V = 0.752; U–B = 0.209
- Absolute magnitude (H): 10.52

2311 El Leoncito, provisional designation 1974 TA_{1}, is a dark and reddish asteroid from the outer region of the asteroid belt, approximately 53 kilometers in diameter. The asteroid was discovered by astronomers at Félix Aguilar Observatory at the Leoncito Astronomical Complex in Argentina on 10 October 1974. It was later named after the discovering site.

== Orbit and classification ==
El Leoncito orbits the Sun in the outer main-belt at a distance of 3.5–3.8 AU once every 6 years and 11 months (2,533 days). Its orbit has an eccentricity of 0.04 and an inclination of 7° with respect to the ecliptic.

It has a well-observed orbit with the lowest possible uncertainty – a condition code of 0 – and an observation arc that spans over a period of almost half a century, using precovery images on photographic plates from 1972.

== Physical characteristics ==
El Leoncito is characterized as a D-type asteroid in the Tholen taxonomy, one of only 46 known asteroids of this spectral type.

The body has a low albedo of 0.04, typical for D-type asteroids. Its rotation period, however, remains unknown.

== Naming ==
This minor planet derives its name from the Spanish name of the discovering astronomical complex of observatories, the Complejo Astronómico El Leoncito (CASLEO). The official naming citation was published by the Minor Planet Center on 22 September 1983 (M.P.C. 8153).
