= 279 Thule =

Outer main-belt asteroid

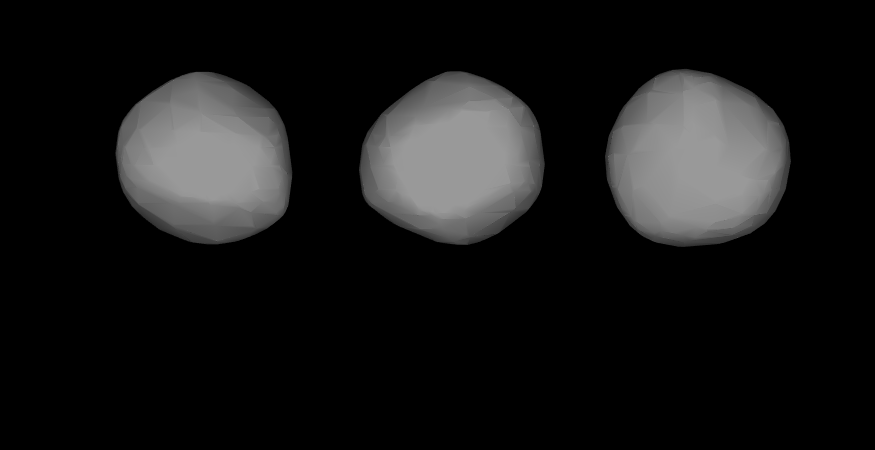
- Lightcurve-based 3D model of 279 Thule

Discovery
- Discovered by: Johann Palisa
- Discovery date: 25 October 1888

Designations
- Pronunciation: /ˈθjuːliː/
- Alternative designations: A888 UA, 1920 GA; 1923 RA, 1927 EC; 1954 FF
- Minor planet category: Asteroid belt (Thule)
- Adjectives: Thulean /ˈθjuːliən/

Orbital characteristics
- Epoch 31 July 2016 (JD 2457600.5)
- Uncertainty parameter 0
- Observation arc: 125.34 yr (45780 d)
- Aphelion: 4.4617880 AU (667.47398 Gm)
- Perihelion: 4.2367660 AU (633.81117 Gm)
- Semi-major axis: 4.3492770 AU (650.64258 Gm)
- Eccentricity: 0.025869
- Orbital period (sidereal): 9.07 yr (3313.0 d)
- Mean anomaly: 62.75874°
- Mean motion: 0° 6^{m} 31.184^{s} / day
- Inclination: 2.323774°
- Longitude of ascending node: 72.46791°
- Argument of perihelion: 42.36797°

Physical characteristics
- Dimensions: 115±12 km 119±13 km
- Synodic rotation period: 23.896 h (0.9957 d)
- Geometric albedo: 0.0412±0.003
- Temperature: 133 K
- Spectral type: B−V=0.75; U−B=0.32; D (Tholen); X (SMASSII)
- Absolute magnitude (H): 8.57

279 Thule is a large asteroid from the outer asteroid belt. It was discovered by Austrian astronomer Johann Palisa on 25 October 1888 in Vienna. This body was named after the ultimate northern land of Thule, according to ancient Greek and Roman lore.

This asteroid orbits the Sun at a distance of 4.35 au (651 Gm), with an eccentricity of 0.026 and an orbital period of 9.07 years. The orbital plane is inclined at an angle of 2.32° to the plane of the ecliptic. Thule was the first asteroid discovered with a semi-major axis greater than 4 AU. It is the only large asteroid with a 4:3 resonance orbital with Jupiter that also has a small eccentricity and orbital inclination.

279 Thule is classified as a D-type asteroid and is probably composed of organic-rich silicates, carbon and anhydrous silicates. Based on infrared measurements, it spans a diameter of approximately 115 km.

== Thule asteroids ==
Thule was the first discovered member of the Thule dynamical group, which as of 2008 was known to consist of three objects: 279 Thule, (186024) 2001 QG207, and (185290) 2006 UB219. The orbits of these bodies are unusual. They orbit in the outermost edge of the asteroid belt in a 4:3 orbital resonance with Jupiter, the result of the periodic force Jupiter exerts on a body with Thule's orbital period, in the same way (though with the reverse effect) as the Kirkwood gaps in the more inner parts of the asteroid belt.

Known members as of May 2021
| Name | semimajor axis (au) | period (years) | eccentricity | inclination (°) | absolute magnitude | Size (km) |
|---|---|---|---|---|---|---|
| 279 Thule | 4.269 | 8.82 | 0.0432 | 2.334 | 8.53 | 126.59±3.7 |
| (185290) 2006 UB219 | 4.290 | 8.89 | 0.1335 | 7.132 | 13.84 | 4.1–10.1 |
| (186024) 2001 QG207 | 4.278 | 8.85 | 0.2513 | 3.238 | 14.53 | 3.0–7.4 |
| (570461) 2006 SJ42 | 4.286 | 8.87 | 0.0465 | 5.501 | 15.1 | 2.3–5.7 |
| (684250) 2008 RE93 | 4.288 | 8.88 | 0.1161 | 3.497 | 15.49 | 1.9–4.7 |
| (654117) 2014 WN504 | 4.297 | 8.91 | 0.2312 | 3.193 | 15.5 | 1.9–4.7 |
| 2014 QX_{231} | 4.283 | 8.86 | 0.3722 | 5.935 | 16.5 | 1.2–3.0 |

== See also ==
- 486958 Arrokoth – A Kuiper belt object formerly nicknamed Ultima Thule
