= D-type asteroid =

Type of asteroid spectral group

D-type asteroids have a very low albedo and a featureless reddish spectrum. It has been suggested that they have a composition of organic-rich silicates, carbon and anhydrous silicates, possibly with water ice in their interiors. D-type asteroids are found in the outer asteroid belt and beyond; examples are 152 Atala, 944 Hidalgo and most Jupiter trojans. It has been suggested that the Tagish Lake meteorite was a fragment from a D-type asteroid, and that the Martian moon Phobos is closely related.

The Nice model suggests that D-type asteroids may have originated in the Kuiper belt. 46 D-type asteroids are known, including: 3552 Don Quixote, 944 Hidalgo, 624 Hektor, and 10199 Chariklo.

== Examples ==
A list of some of the largest D-type asteroids.

Name of Asteroid	Classification		Diameter (km)	Diameter method	Minor planet category
Name of Asteroid	SMASS	Tholen	Diameter (km)	Diameter method	Minor planet category
267 Tirza	D	DU	52.68 ±3.1	IRAS	Main-belt asteroid
279 Thule	X	D	126.59 ±3.7	IRAS	Outer main-belt asteroid
336 Lacadiera	Xk	D	69.31 ±2.4	IRAS	Main-belt asteroid
368 Haidea	–	D	69.61 ±2.2	IRAS	Main-belt asteroid
624 Hektor	–	D	250 ±25	Direct imaging	Jupiter trojan
721 Tabora	–	D	76.07 ±2.5	IRAS	Outer main-belt asteroid
773 Irmintraud	T	D	95.88 ±1.8	IRAS	Main-belt asteroid
884 Priamus	–	D	110 ±10	Absmag	Jupiter trojan
911 Agamemnon	–	D	166.66 ±3.9	IRAS	Jupiter trojan
944 Hidalgo	–	D	38 ±5	Absmag	Centaur
1143 Odysseus	–	D	125.64 ±3.7	IRAS	Jupiter trojan
1144 Oda	–	D	57.59 ±2.2	IRAS	Outer main-belt asteroid
1172 Äneas	–	D	142.82 ±4.8	IRAS	Jupiter trojan
1167 Dubiago	–	D	63.12 ±5.6	IRAS	Outer main-belt asteroid
1256 Normannia	–	D	69.22 ±2.8	IRAS	Outer main-belt asteroid
1269 Rollandia	–	D	105.19 ±2.8	IRAS	Outer main-belt asteroid
1578 Kirkwood	–	D	51.88 ±1.8	IRAS	Outer main-belt asteroid
1583 Antilochus	–	D	101.62 ±3.2	IRAS	Jupiter trojan
1746 Brouwer	–	D	64.25 ±4.9	IRAS	Outer main-belt asteroid
1867 Deiphobus	–	D	122.67 ±3.9	IRAS	Jupiter trojan
2207 Antenor	–	D	85.11 ±3.7	IRAS	Jupiter trojan
2241 Alcathous	–	D	114.63 ±5.8	IRAS	Jupiter trojan
2311 El Leoncito	–	D	53.14 ±3.0	IRAS	Outer main-belt asteroid
2312 Duboshin	–	D	54.94 ±3.2	IRAS	Outer main-belt asteroid
2357 Phereclos	–	D	94.90 ±4.3	IRAS	Jupiter trojan
2363 Cebriones	–	D	81.84 ±5.1	IRAS	Jupiter trojan
2674 Pandarus	–	D	98.10 ±3.2	IRAS	Jupiter trojan
2893 Peiroos	–	D	87.46 ±6.9	IRAS	Jupiter trojan
10199 Chariklo	D	–	302 ±30	n.a.	Centaur

== See also ==
- Asteroid spectral types
- Tagish Lake (meteorite)
