= 944 Hidalgo =

Centaur

- Animation of 944 Hidalgo's movement over 5 minutes in 2003, taken by the Very Large Telescope.

Discovery
- Discovered by: W. Baade
- Discovery site: Bergedorf Obs.
- Discovery date: 31 October 1920

Designations
- Pronunciation: /hɪˈdælɡoʊ/
- Named after: Miguel Hidalgo y Costilla (Mexican revolutionary)
- Alternative designations: 1920 HZ · A920 UB
- Minor planet category: centaur · main-belt unusual
- Symbol: (astrological)

Orbital characteristics
- Epoch 27 April 2019 (JD 2458600.5)
- Uncertainty parameter 0
- Observation arc: 97.97 yr (35,784 d)
- Aphelion: 9.5345 AU
- Perihelion: 1.9474 AU
- Semi-major axis: 5.7410 AU
- Eccentricity: 0.6608
- Orbital period (sidereal): 13.76 yr (5,024 d)
- Mean anomaly: 13.078°
- Mean motion: 0° 4^{m} 18.12^{s} / day
- Inclination: 42.521°
- Longitude of ascending node: 21.420°
- Argument of perihelion: 56.651°
- Jupiter MOID: 0.3285 AU
- T_{Jupiter}: 2.0690

Physical characteristics
- Mean diameter: 52.45±3.60 km 61.4±12.7 km
- Synodic rotation period: 10.063±0.0003 h (Note: Lightcurve plot of (944) Hidalgo by Robert A. Koff (Bob Koff) at the Antelope Hills Observatory, Colorado (H09); Rotation period 10.06 hours with a brightness amplitude of 0.31 mag. Quality code is 3. Summary figures at the LCDB.)
- Geometric albedo: 0.028; 0.042
- Spectral type: Tholen = D
- Absolute magnitude (H): 10.77

944 Hidalgo /hɪˈdælɡoʊ/ is a centaur and unusual object on an eccentric, cometary-like orbit between the asteroid belt and the outer Solar System, approximately 52 kilometers (32 miles) in diameter. Discovered by German astronomer Walter Baade in 1920, it is the first member of the dynamical class of centaurs ever to be discovered. The dark D-type object has a rotation period of 10.1 hours and likely an elongated shape. It was named after Mexican revolutionary Miguel Hidalgo y Costilla.

== Discovery and naming ==
Hidalgo was discovered by German astronomer Walter Baade on 31 October 1920 at Bergedorf Observatory in Hamburg, Germany. It is named for Miguel Hidalgo y Costilla (1753–1811), who was responsible for declaring Mexico's independence in 1810 and the ensuing Mexican War of Independence. German astronomers who were in Mexico to observe a total eclipse on 10 September 1923 had an audience with President Álvaro Obregón. During this meeting, they asked his permission to name the asteroid after Hidalgo (AN 221, 159 from 1924).

== Orbit and classification ==
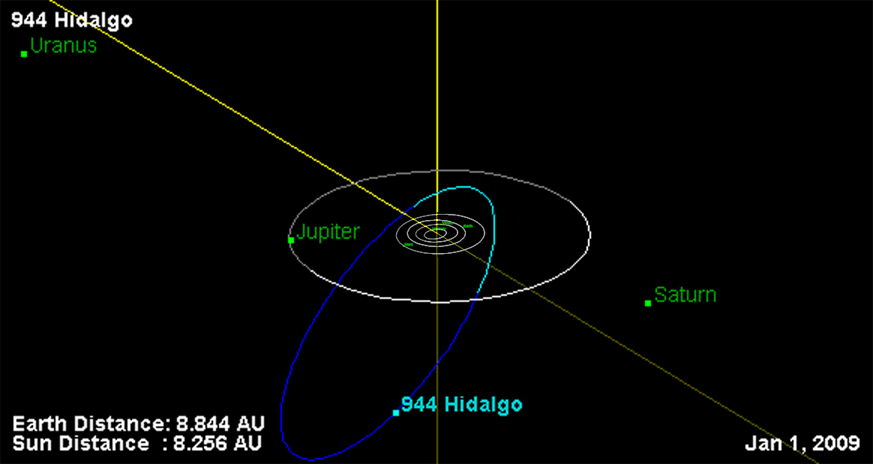
Orbital diagram of Hidalgo

Hidalgo orbits the Sun at a distance of 1.9–9.5 AU once every 13 years and 9 months (5,024 days; semi-major axis of 5.74 AU). Its orbit has a high eccentricity of 0.66 and an inclination of 43° with respect to the ecliptic. The body's observation arc begins with its official discovery observation on 31 October 1920.

With a semi-major axis between that of Jupiter (5.2 AU) and Neptune (30.1 AU), Hidalgo is a member of the dynamically unstable population of centaurs, located between the classical asteroids and the trans-Neptunian objects. The Minor Planet Center classifies it both as main-belt asteroid and unusual object due to an orbital eccentricity higher than 0.5. Hidalgo has traditionally been considered an asteroid because centaurs were not recognized as a distinct class until the discovery of 2060 Chiron in 1977. Alternatively, cis-Neptunian object and distant object are more generic terms that also includes objects further out the Solar System.

Hidalgo's orbit takes it to the inner edge of the asteroid belt and as far out as to the orbit of Saturn (9.0–10.1 AU), a characteristic normally associated with Saturn's family of comets. Some astronomers therefore suspect that it was once a comet. It is a Jupiter- and Saturn-crosser. Strictly speaking, Hidalgo is a Saturn-grazer rather than a crosser as its aphelion does not clear Saturn's. The object's severe orbital inclination is suspected to be the result of a close encounter with Jupiter. Even as recently as 1922, Hidalgo passed within 0.89 AU of Jupiter. Its orbit has a Jupiter minimum orbit intersection distance of only 0.33 AU (49,000,000 km; 31,000,000 mi).

It is unlikely there are any large satellites orbiting Hidalgo larger than about 15 kilometers across. Observations from the Very Large Telescope in 2003 ruled out any secondary objects brighter than V=19.5 further than 200 kilometers from the asteroid. However, smaller or closer-in moons have not been ruled out.

== Physical characteristics ==
In the Tholen and Bus–DeMeo classification, Hidalgo is a dark, carbonaceous D-type asteroid.

According to the surveys carried out by the Japanese Akari satellite and the NEOWISE mission of NASA's Wide-field Infrared Survey Explorer, Hidalgo measures 52.45 and 61.4 kilometers in diameter and its surface has a low albedo of 0.042 and 0.028, respectively. The prominent JPL Small-Body Database currently gives a diameter of 38 kilometers taken from the publication Hazards due to Comets and Asteroids (Tom Gehrels, 1994). The Collaborative Asteroid Lightcurve Link assumes a standard albedo for a carbonaceous asteroid of 0.057 and derives a diameter of 44.6 km based on an absolute magnitude of 10.48, while Johnston's archive adopts Akari's diameter of 52 km with an albedo of 0.042.

In the late 1990s, a network of astronomers worldwide gathered lightcurve data that was ultimately used to derive the spin states and shape models of 10 new asteroids, including Hidalgo. The authors describe the shape model as having 'very large flat areas and a "rectangular" pole-on silhouette, which are strong indications of a highly nonconvex shape'. Some of the light curves show sharp minima, which indicates the object shape may have two lobes. Lightcurve data has also been recorded by observers at the Antelope Hills Observatory (H09) in Colorado, United States. Before Pluto was discovered in 1930, Hidalgo was the furthest known minor planet from the Sun.
