= List of minor planets: 891001–892000 =

The following is a partial list of minor planets, running from minor-planet number 891001 through 892000, inclusive. The primary data for this and other partial lists is based on JPL's "Small-Body Orbital Elements" and data available from the Minor Planet Center. Critical list information is also provided by the MPC, unless otherwise specified from Lowell Observatory. A detailed description of the table's columns and additional sources are given on the main page including a complete list of every page in this series, and a statistical break-up on the dynamical classification of minor planets.

Also see the summary list of all named bodies in numerical and alphabetical order, and the corresponding naming citations for the number range of this particular list. New namings may only be added to this list after official publication, as the preannouncement of names is condemned by the Working Group for Small Bodies Nomenclature of the International Astronomical Union.

Near-Earth obj.	MBA (inner)	MBA (outer)	Centaur
Mars-crosser	MBA (middle)	Jupiter trojan	Trans-Neptunian obj.
Unclassified

== 891001–891100 ==
Designation			Discovery			Properties		Ref
Permanent	Provisional	Named after	Date	Site	Discoverer(s)	Category	Diam.	Ref
891001	2014 SO_{121}	—	September 18, 2014	Haleakala	Pan-STARRS 1	·	630 m	MPC · JPL
891002	2014 SA_{135}	—	May 14, 2008	Kitt Peak	Spacewatch	H	390 m	MPC · JPL
891003	2014 SN_{135}	—	September 18, 2014	Haleakala	Pan-STARRS 1	·	2.1 km	MPC · JPL
891004	2014 SK_{143}	—	September 20, 2014	Haleakala	Pan-STARRS 1	H	320 m	MPC · JPL
891005	2014 SZ_{172}	—	August 20, 2014	Haleakala	Pan-STARRS 1	·	1.4 km	MPC · JPL
891006	2014 SR_{173}	—	September 19, 2007	Kitt Peak	Spacewatch	NYS	490 m	MPC · JPL
891007	2014 SQ_{180}	—	July 31, 2014	Haleakala	Pan-STARRS 1	·	1.1 km	MPC · JPL
891008	2014 ST_{183}	—	August 20, 2014	Haleakala	Pan-STARRS 1	·	800 m	MPC · JPL
891009	2014 SD_{189}	—	August 27, 2014	Haleakala	Pan-STARRS 1	·	750 m	MPC · JPL
891010	2014 SD_{202}	—	January 2, 2012	Kitt Peak	Spacewatch	·	420 m	MPC · JPL
891011	2014 SY_{202}	—	March 6, 2008	Mount Lemmon	Mount Lemmon Survey	·	1.3 km	MPC · JPL
891012	2014 SL_{209}	—	September 20, 2014	Haleakala	Pan-STARRS 1	·	2.0 km	MPC · JPL
891013	2014 SU_{231}	—	September 19, 2014	Haleakala	Pan-STARRS 1	·	1.3 km	MPC · JPL
891014	2014 SM_{237}	—	August 31, 2014	Kitt Peak	Spacewatch	·	870 m	MPC · JPL
891015	2014 SO_{245}	—	July 31, 2014	Haleakala	Pan-STARRS 1	·	2.6 km	MPC · JPL
891016	2014 SW_{247}	—	July 31, 2014	Haleakala	Pan-STARRS 1	·	1.3 km	MPC · JPL
891017	2014 SD_{259}	—	August 31, 2014	Haleakala	Pan-STARRS 1	·	410 m	MPC · JPL
891018	2014 SR_{290}	—	August 31, 2014	Haleakala	Pan-STARRS 1	·	1.3 km	MPC · JPL
891019	2014 SL_{292}	—	October 21, 2003	Kitt Peak	Spacewatch	·	720 m	MPC · JPL
891020	2014 SR_{298}	—	August 27, 2014	Haleakala	Pan-STARRS 1	H	340 m	MPC · JPL
891021	2014 SJ_{307}	—	October 10, 2007	Kitt Peak	Spacewatch	(2076)	530 m	MPC · JPL
891022	2014 SS_{314}	—	April 10, 2013	Haleakala	Pan-STARRS 1	·	930 m	MPC · JPL
891023	2014 SZ_{323}	—	September 25, 2014	Mount Lemmon	Mount Lemmon Survey	H	410 m	MPC · JPL
891024	2014 SE_{337}	—	September 2, 2014	Haleakala	Pan-STARRS 1	NYS	670 m	MPC · JPL
891025	2014 ST_{340}	—	September 9, 2007	Kitt Peak	Spacewatch	·	530 m	MPC · JPL
891026	2014 SC_{342}	—	September 19, 2014	Haleakala	Pan-STARRS 1	AGN	870 m	MPC · JPL
891027	2014 SU_{351}	—	September 25, 2014	Kitt Peak	Spacewatch	H	310 m	MPC · JPL
891028	2014 SL_{366}	—	September 22, 2014	Haleakala	Pan-STARRS 1	·	1.9 km	MPC · JPL
891029	2014 ST_{366}	—	September 26, 2014	Mount Lemmon	Mount Lemmon Survey	·	1.9 km	MPC · JPL
891030	2014 SZ_{366}	—	September 22, 2014	Haleakala	Pan-STARRS 1	PHO	660 m	MPC · JPL
891031	2014 SP_{370}	—	September 20, 2014	Haleakala	Pan-STARRS 1	NYS	870 m	MPC · JPL
891032	2014 SN_{375}	—	September 20, 2014	Haleakala	Pan-STARRS 1	·	1.9 km	MPC · JPL
891033	2014 SD_{377}	—	September 17, 2014	Haleakala	Pan-STARRS 1	WIT	670 m	MPC · JPL
891034	2014 SE_{377}	—	December 6, 2015	Mount Lemmon	Mount Lemmon Survey	KOR	920 m	MPC · JPL
891035	2014 SR_{377}	—	September 29, 2014	Haleakala	Pan-STARRS 1	·	1.2 km	MPC · JPL
891036	2014 SR_{378}	—	September 19, 2014	Haleakala	Pan-STARRS 1	·	1.5 km	MPC · JPL
891037	2014 SU_{381}	—	August 10, 2010	Kitt Peak	Spacewatch	MAS	490 m	MPC · JPL
891038	2014 SW_{381}	—	September 19, 2014	Haleakala	Pan-STARRS 1	·	1.2 km	MPC · JPL
891039	2014 SK_{384}	—	August 7, 2008	Kitt Peak	Spacewatch	·	1.7 km	MPC · JPL
891040	2014 SJ_{386}	—	September 29, 2014	Haleakala	Pan-STARRS 1	·	470 m	MPC · JPL
891041	2014 SD_{387}	—	September 22, 2014	Haleakala	Pan-STARRS 1	VER	1.9 km	MPC · JPL
891042	2014 SW_{394}	—	September 18, 2014	Haleakala	Pan-STARRS 1	H	390 m	MPC · JPL
891043	2014 SK_{400}	—	September 20, 2014	Haleakala	Pan-STARRS 1	KOR	850 m	MPC · JPL
891044	2014 SS_{404}	—	September 22, 2014	Haleakala	Pan-STARRS 1	·	1.8 km	MPC · JPL
891045	2014 SX_{405}	—	September 20, 2014	Haleakala	Pan-STARRS 1	·	580 m	MPC · JPL
891046	2014 SL_{406}	—	September 24, 2014	Mount Lemmon	Mount Lemmon Survey	·	530 m	MPC · JPL
891047	2014 SM_{411}	—	September 19, 2014	Haleakala	Pan-STARRS 1	·	780 m	MPC · JPL
891048	2014 SF_{421}	—	September 19, 2014	Haleakala	Pan-STARRS 1	EUN	810 m	MPC · JPL
891049	2014 SB_{442}	—	September 20, 2014	Haleakala	Pan-STARRS 1	·	1.3 km	MPC · JPL
891050	2014 TW_{16}	—	October 2, 2014	Mount Lemmon	Mount Lemmon Survey	·	370 m	MPC · JPL
891051	2014 TZ_{21}	—	October 1, 2014	Kitt Peak	Spacewatch	·	660 m	MPC · JPL
891052	2014 TU_{65}	—	August 20, 2014	Haleakala	Pan-STARRS 1	·	2.0 km	MPC · JPL
891053	2014 TK_{73}	—	October 15, 2007	Mount Lemmon	Mount Lemmon Survey	·	440 m	MPC · JPL
891054	2014 TE_{76}	—	September 19, 2014	Haleakala	Pan-STARRS 1	·	690 m	MPC · JPL
891055	2014 TZ_{77}	—	October 29, 2005	Kitt Peak	Spacewatch	·	1.7 km	MPC · JPL
891056	2014 TE_{79}	—	October 14, 2014	Mount Lemmon	Mount Lemmon Survey	·	650 m	MPC · JPL
891057	2014 TO_{88}	—	October 1, 2014	Haleakala	Pan-STARRS 1	·	790 m	MPC · JPL
891058	2014 TF_{92}	—	October 2, 2014	Haleakala	Pan-STARRS 1	·	1.7 km	MPC · JPL
891059	2014 TF_{95}	—	September 30, 2014	Mount Lemmon	Mount Lemmon Survey	·	1.6 km	MPC · JPL
891060	2014 TK_{97}	—	October 12, 2014	Mount Lemmon	Mount Lemmon Survey	·	2.3 km	MPC · JPL
891061	2014 TZ_{99}	—	October 5, 2014	Haleakala	Pan-STARRS 1	PHO	640 m	MPC · JPL
891062	2014 TH_{101}	—	October 2, 2014	Haleakala	Pan-STARRS 1	·	650 m	MPC · JPL
891063	2014 TD_{102}	—	October 13, 2014	Mount Lemmon	Mount Lemmon Survey	·	1.1 km	MPC · JPL
891064	2014 TV_{102}	—	October 1, 2014	Haleakala	Pan-STARRS 1	·	1.3 km	MPC · JPL
891065	2014 TY_{107}	—	October 3, 2014	Mount Lemmon	Mount Lemmon Survey	·	2.0 km	MPC · JPL
891066	2014 TJ_{110}	—	October 2, 2014	Haleakala	Pan-STARRS 1	PHO	410 m	MPC · JPL
891067	2014 TD_{113}	—	October 2, 2014	Haleakala	Pan-STARRS 1	·	870 m	MPC · JPL
891068	2014 TO_{116}	—	October 5, 2014	Haleakala	Pan-STARRS 1	H	340 m	MPC · JPL
891069	2014 TK_{117}	—	October 3, 2014	Mount Lemmon	Mount Lemmon Survey	·	460 m	MPC · JPL
891070	2014 TT_{119}	—	October 14, 2014	Kitt Peak	Spacewatch	·	1.3 km	MPC · JPL
891071	2014 TM_{125}	—	August 26, 2019	Haleakala	Pan-STARRS 2	·	1.4 km	MPC · JPL
891072	2014 UD_{2}	—	September 20, 2014	Haleakala	Pan-STARRS 1	·	1.3 km	MPC · JPL
891073	2014 UH_{6}	—	October 1, 2014	Haleakala	Pan-STARRS 1	·	490 m	MPC · JPL
891074	2014 UH_{12}	—	October 3, 2014	Mount Lemmon	Mount Lemmon Survey	H	370 m	MPC · JPL
891075	2014 UH_{14}	—	December 5, 2007	Kitt Peak	Spacewatch	·	660 m	MPC · JPL
891076	2014 UV_{14}	—	October 17, 2014	Kitt Peak	Spacewatch	NYS	710 m	MPC · JPL
891077	2014 UL_{28}	—	October 20, 2014	Mount Lemmon	Mount Lemmon Survey	·	740 m	MPC · JPL
891078	2014 UA_{31}	—	October 3, 2014	Kitt Peak	Spacewatch	H	300 m	MPC · JPL
891079	2014 UJ_{40}	—	October 18, 2014	Mount Lemmon	Mount Lemmon Survey	·	550 m	MPC · JPL
891080	2014 UQ_{49}	—	September 21, 2003	Kitt Peak	Spacewatch	·	630 m	MPC · JPL
891081	2014 UK_{56}	—	October 23, 2014	Mount Lemmon	Mount Lemmon Survey	H	460 m	MPC · JPL
891082	2014 UL_{72}	—	November 2, 2007	Kitt Peak	Spacewatch	·	730 m	MPC · JPL
891083	2014 UN_{89}	—	September 24, 2014	Kitt Peak	Spacewatch	·	480 m	MPC · JPL
891084	2014 UC_{90}	—	October 22, 2014	Kitt Peak	Spacewatch	·	1.6 km	MPC · JPL
891085	2014 UB_{94}	—	October 22, 2014	Mount Lemmon	Mount Lemmon Survey	L5	7.2 km	MPC · JPL
891086	2014 UA_{102}	—	March 16, 2012	Mount Lemmon	Mount Lemmon Survey	·	620 m	MPC · JPL
891087	2014 UG_{103}	—	August 23, 2014	Haleakala	Pan-STARRS 1	H	360 m	MPC · JPL
891088	2014 UZ_{112}	—	January 19, 2012	Haleakala	Pan-STARRS 1	·	440 m	MPC · JPL
891089	2014 UO_{115}	—	November 17, 2008	Catalina	CSS	T_{j} (2.91)	3.2 km	MPC · JPL
891090	2014 UC_{117}	—	October 28, 2014	Haleakala	Pan-STARRS 1	H	330 m	MPC · JPL
891091	2014 UZ_{122}	—	October 22, 2014	Mount Lemmon	Mount Lemmon Survey	·	1.8 km	MPC · JPL
891092	2014 UE_{129}	—	September 25, 2014	Mount Lemmon	Mount Lemmon Survey	·	2.1 km	MPC · JPL
891093	2014 UH_{135}	—	September 28, 2003	Kitt Peak	Spacewatch	NYS	590 m	MPC · JPL
891094	2014 UN_{144}	—	September 22, 2014	Kitt Peak	Spacewatch	·	1.4 km	MPC · JPL
891095	2014 UM_{147}	—	October 25, 2014	Mount Lemmon	Mount Lemmon Survey	·	1.8 km	MPC · JPL
891096	2014 UA_{154}	—	August 25, 2014	Haleakala	Pan-STARRS 1	·	870 m	MPC · JPL
891097	2014 UE_{158}	—	November 2, 2007	Kitt Peak	Spacewatch	·	640 m	MPC · JPL
891098	2014 UM_{159}	—	October 25, 2014	Haleakala	Pan-STARRS 1	·	1.4 km	MPC · JPL
891099	2014 UV_{159}	—	September 20, 2014	Haleakala	Pan-STARRS 1	·	590 m	MPC · JPL
891100	2014 US_{171}	—	October 28, 2014	Mount Lemmon	Mount Lemmon Survey	·	690 m	MPC · JPL

== 891101–891200 ==
back to top

Designation			Discovery			Properties		Ref
Permanent	Provisional	Named after	Date	Site	Discoverer(s)	Category	Diam.	Ref
891101	2014 UQ_{191}	—	August 28, 2014	Haleakala	Pan-STARRS 1	·	1.2 km	MPC · JPL
891102	2014 UP_{210}	—	October 26, 2014	Observatorio Cala	I. de la Cueva, J. L. Ferrer	H	400 m	MPC · JPL
891103	2014 UH_{227}	—	October 29, 2014	Haleakala	Pan-STARRS 1	·	1.8 km	MPC · JPL
891104	2014 UP_{237}	—	October 28, 2014	Haleakala	Pan-STARRS 1	EOS	1.3 km	MPC · JPL
891105	2014 UW_{239}	—	October 29, 2014	Haleakala	Pan-STARRS 1	·	1.6 km	MPC · JPL
891106	2014 UJ_{242}	—	October 25, 2014	Catalina	CSS	H	420 m	MPC · JPL
891107	2014 UZ_{242}	—	October 28, 2014	Haleakala	Pan-STARRS 1	·	1.9 km	MPC · JPL
891108	2014 UZ_{243}	—	October 20, 2014	Mount Lemmon	Mount Lemmon Survey	GAL	1.4 km	MPC · JPL
891109	2014 UJ_{249}	—	October 25, 2014	Haleakala	Pan-STARRS 1	·	1.7 km	MPC · JPL
891110	2014 UV_{252}	—	October 23, 2014	Mount Lemmon	Mount Lemmon Survey	·	1.4 km	MPC · JPL
891111	2014 UF_{254}	—	October 24, 2014	Mount Lemmon	Mount Lemmon Survey	·	2.1 km	MPC · JPL
891112	2014 UX_{254}	—	October 30, 2014	Mount Lemmon	Mount Lemmon Survey	·	1.8 km	MPC · JPL
891113	2014 UO_{255}	—	October 25, 2014	Haleakala	Pan-STARRS 1	·	1.6 km	MPC · JPL
891114	2014 UZ_{255}	—	October 30, 2014	Haleakala	Pan-STARRS 1	·	1.8 km	MPC · JPL
891115	2014 UQ_{257}	—	October 26, 2014	Mount Lemmon	Mount Lemmon Survey	·	1.6 km	MPC · JPL
891116	2014 UT_{263}	—	October 25, 2014	Mount Lemmon	Mount Lemmon Survey	·	1.7 km	MPC · JPL
891117	2014 UG_{264}	—	October 28, 2014	Mount Lemmon	Mount Lemmon Survey	EOS	1.2 km	MPC · JPL
891118	2014 UL_{264}	—	October 28, 2014	Haleakala	Pan-STARRS 1	EOS	1.1 km	MPC · JPL
891119	2014 UQ_{264}	—	October 17, 2014	Mount Lemmon	Mount Lemmon Survey	·	1.3 km	MPC · JPL
891120	2014 UZ_{264}	—	October 20, 2014	Mount Lemmon	Mount Lemmon Survey	·	450 m	MPC · JPL
891121	2014 UP_{269}	—	October 26, 2014	Mount Lemmon	Mount Lemmon Survey	·	1.3 km	MPC · JPL
891122	2014 UT_{269}	—	October 18, 2014	Mount Lemmon	Mount Lemmon Survey	·	1.6 km	MPC · JPL
891123	2014 UR_{272}	—	October 22, 2014	Mount Lemmon	Mount Lemmon Survey	·	670 m	MPC · JPL
891124	2014 UG_{273}	—	October 24, 2014	Mount Lemmon	Mount Lemmon Survey	·	620 m	MPC · JPL
891125	2014 UF_{274}	—	October 28, 2014	Haleakala	Pan-STARRS 1	·	940 m	MPC · JPL
891126	2014 UH_{275}	—	October 29, 2014	Haleakala	Pan-STARRS 1	PHO	720 m	MPC · JPL
891127	2014 UQ_{278}	—	November 2, 2007	Kitt Peak	Spacewatch	·	530 m	MPC · JPL
891128	2014 UX_{281}	—	October 16, 2014	Mount Lemmon	Mount Lemmon Survey	EUN	1.1 km	MPC · JPL
891129	2014 UD_{284}	—	October 29, 2014	Haleakala	Pan-STARRS 1	·	470 m	MPC · JPL
891130	2014 VR	—	September 20, 2004	Siding Spring	SSS	·	1.7 km	MPC · JPL
891131	2014 VZ_{19}	—	October 21, 2014	Mount Lemmon	Mount Lemmon Survey	·	530 m	MPC · JPL
891132	2014 VR_{28}	—	October 21, 2014	Mount Lemmon	Mount Lemmon Survey	MAS	420 m	MPC · JPL
891133	2014 VD_{38}	—	November 4, 2014	Mount Lemmon	Mount Lemmon Survey	·	1.1 km	MPC · JPL
891134	2014 VH_{40}	—	November 12, 2014	Haleakala	Pan-STARRS 1	·	1.2 km	MPC · JPL
891135	2014 VS_{40}	—	November 1, 2014	Mount Lemmon	Mount Lemmon Survey	·	1.3 km	MPC · JPL
891136	2014 VT_{40}	—	November 1, 2014	Mount Lemmon	Mount Lemmon Survey	·	1.1 km	MPC · JPL
891137	2014 VV_{40}	—	November 15, 2014	Mount Lemmon	Mount Lemmon Survey	·	770 m	MPC · JPL
891138	2014 VT_{42}	—	November 3, 2014	Mount Lemmon	Mount Lemmon Survey	·	760 m	MPC · JPL
891139	2014 VX_{42}	—	November 12, 2014	Haleakala	Pan-STARRS 1	H	340 m	MPC · JPL
891140	2014 WA_{7}	—	November 18, 2014	Haleakala	Pan-STARRS 1	T_{j} (2.91)	2.0 km	MPC · JPL
891141	2014 WT_{10}	—	October 28, 2014	Haleakala	Pan-STARRS 1	MAS	350 m	MPC · JPL
891142	2014 WP_{12}	—	September 19, 1998	Apache Point	SDSS	·	1.2 km	MPC · JPL
891143	2014 WL_{14}	—	February 4, 2005	Kitt Peak	Spacewatch	·	440 m	MPC · JPL
891144	2014 WJ_{18}	—	November 16, 2014	Mount Lemmon	Mount Lemmon Survey	·	2.3 km	MPC · JPL
891145	2014 WP_{21}	—	November 17, 2014	Mount Lemmon	Mount Lemmon Survey	·	1.7 km	MPC · JPL
891146	2014 WW_{24}	—	November 17, 2014	Mount Lemmon	Mount Lemmon Survey	·	570 m	MPC · JPL
891147	2014 WK_{31}	—	September 13, 2007	Mount Lemmon	Mount Lemmon Survey	·	490 m	MPC · JPL
891148	2014 WV_{34}	—	November 2, 2007	Kitt Peak	Spacewatch	·	580 m	MPC · JPL
891149	2014 WJ_{39}	—	October 25, 2014	Haleakala	Pan-STARRS 1	EOS	1.1 km	MPC · JPL
891150	2014 WW_{66}	—	November 17, 2014	Mount Lemmon	Mount Lemmon Survey	PHO	760 m	MPC · JPL
891151	2014 WW_{76}	—	November 17, 2014	Mount Lemmon	Mount Lemmon Survey	KOR	1 km	MPC · JPL
891152	2014 WD_{91}	—	February 16, 2012	Haleakala	Pan-STARRS 1	·	520 m	MPC · JPL
891153	2014 WR_{93}	—	October 22, 2014	Kitt Peak	Spacewatch	·	1.2 km	MPC · JPL
891154	2014 WH_{96}	—	November 17, 2014	Haleakala	Pan-STARRS 1	·	610 m	MPC · JPL
891155	2014 WD_{98}	—	November 13, 2007	Mount Lemmon	Mount Lemmon Survey	·	530 m	MPC · JPL
891156	2014 WO_{98}	—	December 14, 2003	Kitt Peak	Spacewatch	·	1.7 km	MPC · JPL
891157	2014 WG_{100}	—	November 17, 2014	Haleakala	Pan-STARRS 1	PHO	800 m	MPC · JPL
891158	2014 WN_{107}	—	September 22, 2014	Kitt Peak	Spacewatch	·	1.6 km	MPC · JPL
891159	2014 WF_{122}	—	November 16, 2014	Kitt Peak	Spacewatch	·	710 m	MPC · JPL
891160	2014 WA_{137}	—	November 17, 2014	Haleakala	Pan-STARRS 1	THM	1.4 km	MPC · JPL
891161	2014 WE_{137}	—	April 19, 2013	Haleakala	Pan-STARRS 1	H	300 m	MPC · JPL
891162	2014 WK_{137}	—	February 25, 2012	Mount Lemmon	Mount Lemmon Survey	·	610 m	MPC · JPL
891163	2014 WT_{141}	—	November 17, 2014	Haleakala	Pan-STARRS 1	·	1.4 km	MPC · JPL
891164	2014 WZ_{142}	—	November 17, 2014	Haleakala	Pan-STARRS 1	·	1.8 km	MPC · JPL
891165	2014 WQ_{144}	—	February 25, 2012	Kitt Peak	Spacewatch	·	710 m	MPC · JPL
891166	2014 WS_{147}	—	October 1, 2010	Mount Lemmon	Mount Lemmon Survey	MAS	470 m	MPC · JPL
891167	2014 WD_{155}	—	March 29, 2012	Mount Lemmon	Mount Lemmon Survey	·	860 m	MPC · JPL
891168	2014 WL_{160}	—	November 18, 2014	Haleakala	Pan-STARRS 1	·	640 m	MPC · JPL
891169	2014 WY_{161}	—	March 22, 2012	Mount Lemmon	Mount Lemmon Survey	·	570 m	MPC · JPL
891170	2014 WD_{162}	—	October 24, 2014	Mount Lemmon	Mount Lemmon Survey	H	470 m	MPC · JPL
891171	2014 WQ_{167}	—	October 10, 2007	Mount Lemmon	Mount Lemmon Survey	(2076)	510 m	MPC · JPL
891172	2014 WF_{169}	—	December 26, 2011	Kitt Peak	Spacewatch	·	570 m	MPC · JPL
891173	2014 WB_{180}	—	October 2, 2014	Haleakala	Pan-STARRS 1	·	520 m	MPC · JPL
891174	2014 WZ_{181}	—	September 24, 2014	Kitt Peak	Spacewatch	·	1.6 km	MPC · JPL
891175	2014 WH_{198}	—	November 21, 2014	Haleakala	Pan-STARRS 1	EOS	1.1 km	MPC · JPL
891176	2014 WC_{212}	—	October 13, 2014	Mount Lemmon	Mount Lemmon Survey	·	460 m	MPC · JPL
891177	2014 WS_{216}	—	October 25, 2014	Haleakala	Pan-STARRS 1	·	430 m	MPC · JPL
891178	2014 WW_{216}	—	November 16, 2014	Mount Lemmon	Mount Lemmon Survey	H	340 m	MPC · JPL
891179	2014 WY_{217}	—	March 2, 2012	Kitt Peak	Spacewatch	NYS	620 m	MPC · JPL
891180	2014 WY_{229}	—	October 21, 2014	Mount Lemmon	Mount Lemmon Survey	NYS	540 m	MPC · JPL
891181	2014 WT_{230}	—	February 27, 2012	Haleakala	Pan-STARRS 1	·	480 m	MPC · JPL
891182	2014 WE_{232}	—	November 1, 2014	Mount Lemmon	Mount Lemmon Survey	H	360 m	MPC · JPL
891183	2014 WP_{232}	—	November 19, 2014	Haleakala	Pan-STARRS 1	·	1.2 km	MPC · JPL
891184	2014 WF_{237}	—	November 20, 2014	Mount Lemmon	Mount Lemmon Survey	·	1.1 km	MPC · JPL
891185	2014 WD_{240}	—	November 16, 2014	Mount Lemmon	Mount Lemmon Survey	·	470 m	MPC · JPL
891186	2014 WC_{247}	—	November 21, 2014	Haleakala	Pan-STARRS 1	·	570 m	MPC · JPL
891187	2014 WK_{249}	—	September 24, 2014	Haleakala	Pan-STARRS 1	H	360 m	MPC · JPL
891188	2014 WP_{254}	—	November 21, 2014	Haleakala	Pan-STARRS 1	·	1.2 km	MPC · JPL
891189	2014 WB_{257}	—	November 21, 2014	Haleakala	Pan-STARRS 1	·	550 m	MPC · JPL
891190	2014 WP_{258}	—	October 23, 2014	Kitt Peak	Spacewatch	THB	1.8 km	MPC · JPL
891191	2014 WD_{259}	—	October 22, 2014	Kitt Peak	Spacewatch	·	630 m	MPC · JPL
891192	2014 WE_{267}	—	December 19, 2007	Mount Lemmon	Mount Lemmon Survey	·	600 m	MPC · JPL
891193	2014 WH_{272}	—	November 21, 2014	Haleakala	Pan-STARRS 1	(5)	870 m	MPC · JPL
891194	2014 WN_{273}	—	December 16, 2009	Mount Lemmon	Mount Lemmon Survey	·	1.7 km	MPC · JPL
891195	2014 WL_{279}	—	November 21, 2014	Haleakala	Pan-STARRS 1	·	750 m	MPC · JPL
891196	2014 WP_{281}	—	November 21, 2014	Haleakala	Pan-STARRS 1	·	750 m	MPC · JPL
891197	2014 WR_{281}	—	November 21, 2014	Haleakala	Pan-STARRS 1	·	640 m	MPC · JPL
891198	2014 WW_{293}	—	February 2, 2008	Kitt Peak	Spacewatch	·	860 m	MPC · JPL
891199	2014 WC_{298}	—	November 21, 2014	Haleakala	Pan-STARRS 1	·	1.2 km	MPC · JPL
891200	2014 WE_{298}	—	December 20, 2009	Kitt Peak	Spacewatch	AEG	1.5 km	MPC · JPL

== 891201–891300 ==
back to top

Designation			Discovery			Properties		Ref
Permanent	Provisional	Named after	Date	Site	Discoverer(s)	Category	Diam.	Ref
891201	2014 WU_{307}	—	November 22, 2014	Mount Lemmon	Mount Lemmon Survey	·	1.5 km	MPC · JPL
891202	2014 WN_{312}	—	August 6, 2014	Haleakala	Pan-STARRS 1	·	640 m	MPC · JPL
891203	2014 WS_{314}	—	August 25, 2014	Haleakala	Pan-STARRS 1	V	420 m	MPC · JPL
891204	2014 WH_{319}	—	October 2, 2014	Haleakala	Pan-STARRS 1	·	500 m	MPC · JPL
891205	2014 WL_{323}	—	October 28, 2014	Mount Lemmon	Mount Lemmon Survey	·	1.1 km	MPC · JPL
891206	2014 WS_{334}	—	November 22, 2014	Haleakala	Pan-STARRS 1	·	2.0 km	MPC · JPL
891207	2014 WX_{346}	—	November 22, 2014	Haleakala	Pan-STARRS 1	·	520 m	MPC · JPL
891208	2014 WK_{364}	—	November 27, 2014	Mount Lemmon	Mount Lemmon Survey	H	340 m	MPC · JPL
891209	2014 WN_{366}	—	November 26, 2014	Mount Lemmon	Mount Lemmon Survey	H	440 m	MPC · JPL
891210	2014 WT_{380}	—	November 22, 2014	Haleakala	Pan-STARRS 1	H	440 m	MPC · JPL
891211	2014 WV_{384}	—	October 23, 2003	Kitt Peak	Spacewatch	·	620 m	MPC · JPL
891212	2014 WV_{392}	—	November 24, 2014	Kitt Peak	Spacewatch	·	1.5 km	MPC · JPL
891213	2014 WL_{398}	—	October 7, 2014	Haleakala	Pan-STARRS 1	·	960 m	MPC · JPL
891214	2014 WM_{398}	—	November 25, 2014	Haleakala	Pan-STARRS 1	·	1.8 km	MPC · JPL
891215	2014 WL_{399}	—	November 25, 2014	Haleakala	Pan-STARRS 1	H	400 m	MPC · JPL
891216	2014 WC_{401}	—	November 12, 2014	Haleakala	Pan-STARRS 1	·	540 m	MPC · JPL
891217	2014 WO_{406}	—	November 26, 2014	Haleakala	Pan-STARRS 1	NYS	510 m	MPC · JPL
891218	2014 WH_{407}	—	November 26, 2014	Haleakala	Pan-STARRS 1	·	520 m	MPC · JPL
891219	2014 WL_{409}	—	November 26, 2014	Haleakala	Pan-STARRS 1	·	1.4 km	MPC · JPL
891220	2014 WR_{412}	—	November 26, 2014	Haleakala	Pan-STARRS 1	·	770 m	MPC · JPL
891221	2014 WD_{413}	—	November 26, 2014	Haleakala	Pan-STARRS 1	·	2.0 km	MPC · JPL
891222	2014 WH_{415}	—	January 10, 2010	Kitt Peak	Spacewatch	·	2.3 km	MPC · JPL
891223	2014 WZ_{417}	—	January 13, 2008	Kitt Peak	Spacewatch	·	620 m	MPC · JPL
891224	2014 WZ_{424}	—	November 26, 2014	Haleakala	Pan-STARRS 1	·	1.8 km	MPC · JPL
891225	2014 WW_{425}	—	November 26, 2014	Haleakala	Pan-STARRS 1	·	1.7 km	MPC · JPL
891226	2014 WQ_{434}	—	November 29, 2014	Mount Lemmon	Mount Lemmon Survey	·	800 m	MPC · JPL
891227	2014 WZ_{436}	—	October 25, 2014	Kitt Peak	Spacewatch	·	600 m	MPC · JPL
891228	2014 WJ_{438}	—	November 27, 2014	Haleakala	Pan-STARRS 1	·	760 m	MPC · JPL
891229	2014 WT_{440}	—	November 24, 2014	Mount Lemmon	Mount Lemmon Survey	·	490 m	MPC · JPL
891230	2014 WQ_{444}	—	November 27, 2014	Haleakala	Pan-STARRS 1	·	1.6 km	MPC · JPL
891231	2014 WH_{445}	—	November 16, 2014	Mount Lemmon	Mount Lemmon Survey	·	1.1 km	MPC · JPL
891232	2014 WT_{447}	—	November 27, 2014	Haleakala	Pan-STARRS 1	·	2.0 km	MPC · JPL
891233	2014 WA_{449}	—	September 3, 2010	Mount Lemmon	Mount Lemmon Survey	·	700 m	MPC · JPL
891234	2014 WV_{454}	—	October 2, 2014	Haleakala	Pan-STARRS 1	·	1.3 km	MPC · JPL
891235	2014 WG_{458}	—	November 27, 2014	Haleakala	Pan-STARRS 1	·	2.5 km	MPC · JPL
891236	2014 WD_{460}	—	September 15, 2010	Mount Lemmon	Mount Lemmon Survey	NYS	770 m	MPC · JPL
891237	2014 WR_{471}	—	November 28, 2014	Mount Lemmon	Mount Lemmon Survey	·	1.4 km	MPC · JPL
891238	2014 WU_{485}	—	September 20, 2014	Haleakala	Pan-STARRS 1	·	660 m	MPC · JPL
891239	2014 WG_{487}	—	October 26, 2014	Mount Lemmon	Mount Lemmon Survey	·	1 km	MPC · JPL
891240	2014 WW_{493}	—	December 26, 2008	Bergisch Gladbach	W. Bickel	·	2.2 km	MPC · JPL
891241	2014 WH_{494}	—	November 30, 2014	Haleakala	Pan-STARRS 1	·	2.2 km	MPC · JPL
891242	2014 WQ_{494}	—	November 30, 2014	Haleakala	Pan-STARRS 1	PHO	720 m	MPC · JPL
891243	2014 WP_{496}	—	November 30, 2014	Haleakala	Pan-STARRS 1	·	2.0 km	MPC · JPL
891244	2014 WB_{500}	—	October 5, 2014	Haleakala	Pan-STARRS 1	PHO	730 m	MPC · JPL
891245	2014 WE_{511}	—	September 14, 2013	Haleakala	Pan-STARRS 1	L5	5.4 km	MPC · JPL
891246	2014 WD_{512}	—	November 20, 2014	Haleakala	Pan-STARRS 1	H	390 m	MPC · JPL
891247	2014 WK_{512}	—	November 26, 2014	Haleakala	Pan-STARRS 1	H	340 m	MPC · JPL
891248	2014 WN_{512}	—	November 27, 2014	Mount Lemmon	Mount Lemmon Survey	H	420 m	MPC · JPL
891249	2014 WQ_{524}	—	November 18, 2014	Haleakala	Pan-STARRS 1	·	1.6 km	MPC · JPL
891250	2014 WV_{524}	—	November 19, 2014	Mount Lemmon	Mount Lemmon Survey	·	1.1 km	MPC · JPL
891251	2014 WL_{530}	—	November 25, 2014	Haleakala	Pan-STARRS 1	·	1.5 km	MPC · JPL
891252	2014 WM_{533}	—	November 28, 2014	Haleakala	Pan-STARRS 1	·	1.3 km	MPC · JPL
891253	2014 WP_{537}	—	November 25, 2014	Haleakala	Pan-STARRS 1	PHO	700 m	MPC · JPL
891254	2014 WZ_{537}	—	November 18, 2014	Haleakala	Pan-STARRS 1	PHO	670 m	MPC · JPL
891255	2014 WE_{539}	—	November 24, 2014	Haleakala	Pan-STARRS 1	·	1.5 km	MPC · JPL
891256	2014 WG_{539}	—	November 28, 2014	Haleakala	Pan-STARRS 1	PHO	840 m	MPC · JPL
891257	2014 WD_{540}	—	November 29, 2014	Haleakala	Pan-STARRS 1	H	350 m	MPC · JPL
891258	2014 WE_{540}	—	November 27, 2014	Haleakala	Pan-STARRS 1	H	340 m	MPC · JPL
891259	2014 WO_{540}	—	November 17, 2014	Haleakala	Pan-STARRS 1	H	390 m	MPC · JPL
891260	2014 WS_{540}	—	November 26, 2014	Mount Lemmon	Mount Lemmon Survey	H	320 m	MPC · JPL
891261	2014 WT_{540}	—	November 25, 2014	Haleakala	Pan-STARRS 1	H	330 m	MPC · JPL
891262	2014 WT_{541}	—	November 26, 2014	Haleakala	Pan-STARRS 1	GAL	1.2 km	MPC · JPL
891263	2014 WG_{544}	—	November 26, 2014	Haleakala	Pan-STARRS 1	·	2.1 km	MPC · JPL
891264	2014 WY_{544}	—	November 22, 2014	Haleakala	Pan-STARRS 1	·	1.7 km	MPC · JPL
891265	2014 WQ_{545}	—	November 26, 2014	Haleakala	Pan-STARRS 1	·	1.3 km	MPC · JPL
891266	2014 WS_{546}	—	November 20, 2003	Kitt Peak	Spacewatch	·	1.7 km	MPC · JPL
891267	2014 WM_{547}	—	November 30, 2014	Haleakala	Pan-STARRS 1	·	1.2 km	MPC · JPL
891268	2014 WL_{549}	—	November 22, 2014	Haleakala	Pan-STARRS 1	TIR	1.9 km	MPC · JPL
891269	2014 WO_{549}	—	November 20, 2014	Mount Lemmon	Mount Lemmon Survey	THB	1.9 km	MPC · JPL
891270	2014 WU_{549}	—	November 21, 2014	Haleakala	Pan-STARRS 1	·	1.1 km	MPC · JPL
891271	2014 WP_{551}	—	November 28, 2014	Haleakala	Pan-STARRS 1	·	1.6 km	MPC · JPL
891272	2014 WQ_{551}	—	November 28, 2014	Haleakala	Pan-STARRS 1	·	1.4 km	MPC · JPL
891273	2014 WX_{551}	—	November 26, 2014	Haleakala	Pan-STARRS 1	·	1.4 km	MPC · JPL
891274	2014 WA_{552}	—	November 26, 2014	Haleakala	Pan-STARRS 1	·	1.5 km	MPC · JPL
891275	2014 WE_{552}	—	November 26, 2014	Haleakala	Pan-STARRS 1	·	1.4 km	MPC · JPL
891276	2014 WH_{554}	—	November 29, 2014	Haleakala	Pan-STARRS 1	JUN	880 m	MPC · JPL
891277	2014 WS_{556}	—	November 29, 2014	Haleakala	Pan-STARRS 1	·	820 m	MPC · JPL
891278	2014 WC_{559}	—	November 24, 2014	Mount Lemmon	Mount Lemmon Survey	·	820 m	MPC · JPL
891279	2014 WN_{559}	—	November 26, 2014	Haleakala	Pan-STARRS 1	·	1.3 km	MPC · JPL
891280	2014 WP_{559}	—	November 17, 2014	Haleakala	Pan-STARRS 1	·	1.2 km	MPC · JPL
891281	2014 WW_{559}	—	November 26, 2014	Mount Lemmon	Mount Lemmon Survey	·	1.6 km	MPC · JPL
891282	2014 WF_{562}	—	November 22, 2014	Mount Lemmon	Mount Lemmon Survey	·	1.3 km	MPC · JPL
891283	2014 WG_{562}	—	November 21, 2014	Haleakala	Pan-STARRS 1	·	1.5 km	MPC · JPL
891284	2014 WZ_{562}	—	November 27, 2014	Mount Lemmon	Mount Lemmon Survey	·	1.0 km	MPC · JPL
891285	2014 WA_{563}	—	November 17, 2014	Haleakala	Pan-STARRS 1	THB	2.0 km	MPC · JPL
891286	2014 WJ_{563}	—	November 21, 2014	Mount Lemmon	Mount Lemmon Survey	EOS	1.2 km	MPC · JPL
891287	2014 WY_{563}	—	November 18, 2014	Haleakala	Pan-STARRS 1	·	1.7 km	MPC · JPL
891288	2014 WV_{564}	—	November 28, 2014	Kitt Peak	Spacewatch	·	1.4 km	MPC · JPL
891289	2014 WQ_{565}	—	November 22, 2014	Haleakala	Pan-STARRS 1	·	1.6 km	MPC · JPL
891290	2014 WO_{569}	—	November 29, 2014	Mount Lemmon	Mount Lemmon Survey	·	1.5 km	MPC · JPL
891291	2014 WU_{570}	—	November 17, 2014	Haleakala	Pan-STARRS 1	·	1.4 km	MPC · JPL
891292	2014 WP_{571}	—	November 20, 2014	Haleakala	Pan-STARRS 1	·	1.2 km	MPC · JPL
891293	2014 WT_{571}	—	November 17, 2014	Haleakala	Pan-STARRS 1	·	1.1 km	MPC · JPL
891294	2014 WS_{572}	—	November 21, 2014	Haleakala	Pan-STARRS 1	·	810 m	MPC · JPL
891295	2014 WU_{573}	—	November 23, 2014	Mount Lemmon	Mount Lemmon Survey	·	1.5 km	MPC · JPL
891296	2014 WE_{574}	—	November 20, 2014	Haleakala	Pan-STARRS 1	L5	7.2 km	MPC · JPL
891297	2014 WZ_{575}	—	November 28, 2014	Haleakala	Pan-STARRS 1	·	830 m	MPC · JPL
891298	2014 WE_{576}	—	November 29, 2014	Mount Lemmon	Mount Lemmon Survey	·	1.7 km	MPC · JPL
891299	2014 WG_{576}	—	November 20, 2014	Mount Lemmon	Mount Lemmon Survey	EOS	1.2 km	MPC · JPL
891300	2014 WW_{576}	—	November 29, 2014	Mount Lemmon	Mount Lemmon Survey	EOS	1.3 km	MPC · JPL

== 891301–891400 ==
back to top

Designation			Discovery			Properties		Ref
Permanent	Provisional	Named after	Date	Site	Discoverer(s)	Category	Diam.	Ref
891301	2014 WZ_{579}	—	November 28, 2014	Mount Lemmon	Mount Lemmon Survey	·	570 m	MPC · JPL
891302	2014 WG_{580}	—	November 20, 2014	Haleakala	Pan-STARRS 1	·	1.4 km	MPC · JPL
891303	2014 WA_{583}	—	November 20, 2014	Haleakala	Pan-STARRS 1	·	2.3 km	MPC · JPL
891304	2014 WB_{583}	—	November 25, 2014	Haleakala	Pan-STARRS 1	·	1.8 km	MPC · JPL
891305	2014 WX_{585}	—	November 26, 2014	Haleakala	Pan-STARRS 1	·	1.1 km	MPC · JPL
891306	2014 WP_{587}	—	November 29, 2014	Mount Lemmon	Mount Lemmon Survey	·	1.9 km	MPC · JPL
891307	2014 WL_{588}	—	November 17, 2014	Haleakala	Pan-STARRS 1	·	530 m	MPC · JPL
891308	2014 WR_{588}	—	November 21, 2014	Haleakala	Pan-STARRS 1	·	1.5 km	MPC · JPL
891309	2014 WK_{589}	—	November 17, 2014	Mount Lemmon	Mount Lemmon Survey	·	1.4 km	MPC · JPL
891310	2014 WT_{589}	—	November 24, 2014	Mount Lemmon	Mount Lemmon Survey	·	1.2 km	MPC · JPL
891311	2014 WX_{589}	—	November 20, 2014	Haleakala	Pan-STARRS 1	H	320 m	MPC · JPL
891312	2014 WB_{590}	—	November 26, 2014	Haleakala	Pan-STARRS 1	·	2.4 km	MPC · JPL
891313	2014 WG_{592}	—	November 17, 2014	Haleakala	Pan-STARRS 1	H	360 m	MPC · JPL
891314	2014 WW_{592}	—	November 21, 2014	Haleakala	Pan-STARRS 1	THM	1.3 km	MPC · JPL
891315	2014 WB_{594}	—	November 26, 2014	Catalina	CSS	·	650 m	MPC · JPL
891316	2014 WD_{594}	—	November 22, 2014	Mount Lemmon	Mount Lemmon Survey	·	2.1 km	MPC · JPL
891317	2014 WN_{594}	—	November 26, 2014	Haleakala	Pan-STARRS 1	·	550 m	MPC · JPL
891318	2014 WP_{594}	—	January 15, 2008	Mount Lemmon	Mount Lemmon Survey	·	670 m	MPC · JPL
891319	2014 WA_{595}	—	June 7, 2013	Haleakala	Pan-STARRS 1	·	510 m	MPC · JPL
891320	2014 WZ_{596}	—	November 26, 2014	Mount Lemmon	Mount Lemmon Survey	·	1.5 km	MPC · JPL
891321	2014 WM_{598}	—	November 26, 2014	Haleakala	Pan-STARRS 1	·	720 m	MPC · JPL
891322	2014 WF_{603}	—	November 26, 2014	Haleakala	Pan-STARRS 1	·	1.4 km	MPC · JPL
891323	2014 WK_{605}	—	November 17, 2014	Haleakala	Pan-STARRS 1	·	840 m	MPC · JPL
891324	2014 WA_{606}	—	November 27, 2014	Haleakala	Pan-STARRS 1	H	400 m	MPC · JPL
891325	2014 WR_{606}	—	November 21, 2014	Haleakala	Pan-STARRS 1	·	520 m	MPC · JPL
891326	2014 WJ_{607}	—	November 19, 2014	Haleakala	Pan-STARRS 1	·	490 m	MPC · JPL
891327	2014 WN_{607}	—	November 23, 2014	Haleakala	Pan-STARRS 1	T_{j} (2.99)	1.9 km	MPC · JPL
891328	2014 WA_{608}	—	November 20, 2014	Mount Lemmon	Mount Lemmon Survey	·	480 m	MPC · JPL
891329	2014 WF_{608}	—	November 29, 2014	Haleakala	Pan-STARRS 1	·	2.1 km	MPC · JPL
891330	2014 WE_{611}	—	February 26, 2012	Haleakala	Pan-STARRS 1	·	510 m	MPC · JPL
891331	2014 WN_{611}	—	November 26, 2014	Haleakala	Pan-STARRS 1	·	2.0 km	MPC · JPL
891332	2014 WN_{612}	—	November 20, 2014	Haleakala	Pan-STARRS 1	·	1.5 km	MPC · JPL
891333	2014 WS_{613}	—	November 16, 2014	Mount Lemmon	Mount Lemmon Survey	EUP	2.1 km	MPC · JPL
891334	2014 WL_{615}	—	November 29, 2014	Mount Lemmon	Mount Lemmon Survey	·	2.2 km	MPC · JPL
891335	2014 XY	—	December 1, 2014	Mount Lemmon	Mount Lemmon Survey	·	600 m	MPC · JPL
891336	2014 XE_{3}	—	November 20, 2014	Mount Lemmon	Mount Lemmon Survey	·	670 m	MPC · JPL
891337	2014 XK_{5}	—	November 22, 2014	Haleakala	Pan-STARRS 1	·	800 m	MPC · JPL
891338	2014 XS_{13}	—	November 27, 2014	Haleakala	Pan-STARRS 1	V	390 m	MPC · JPL
891339	2014 XW_{16}	—	November 26, 2014	Haleakala	Pan-STARRS 1	EOS	1.1 km	MPC · JPL
891340	2014 XT_{18}	—	December 10, 2014	Mount Lemmon	Mount Lemmon Survey	·	1.9 km	MPC · JPL
891341	2014 XA_{20}	—	October 26, 2014	Mount Lemmon	Mount Lemmon Survey	·	1.1 km	MPC · JPL
891342	2014 XZ_{22}	—	November 23, 2014	Mount Lemmon	Mount Lemmon Survey	·	1.6 km	MPC · JPL
891343	2014 XL_{25}	—	November 29, 2014	Mount Lemmon	Mount Lemmon Survey	·	1.0 km	MPC · JPL
891344	2014 XX_{35}	—	November 17, 2014	Mount Lemmon	Mount Lemmon Survey	·	1.1 km	MPC · JPL
891345	2014 XY_{37}	—	December 15, 2014	Kitt Peak	Spacewatch	·	1.8 km	MPC · JPL
891346	2014 XF_{41}	—	January 28, 2007	Mount Lemmon	Mount Lemmon Survey	H	390 m	MPC · JPL
891347	2014 XJ_{41}	—	December 9, 2014	Haleakala	Pan-STARRS 1	H	400 m	MPC · JPL
891348	2014 XS_{41}	—	December 12, 2014	Haleakala	Pan-STARRS 1	·	2.2 km	MPC · JPL
891349	2014 XW_{44}	—	December 15, 2014	Haleakala	Pan-STARRS 1	H	350 m	MPC · JPL
891350	2014 XF_{45}	—	December 10, 2014	Haleakala	Pan-STARRS 1	H	380 m	MPC · JPL
891351	2014 XL_{45}	—	December 10, 2014	Mount Lemmon	Mount Lemmon Survey	·	590 m	MPC · JPL
891352	2014 XP_{45}	—	December 1, 2014	Haleakala	Pan-STARRS 1	·	1.2 km	MPC · JPL
891353	2014 XR_{47}	—	December 12, 2014	Haleakala	Pan-STARRS 1	H	390 m	MPC · JPL
891354	2014 XM_{48}	—	December 12, 2014	Haleakala	Pan-STARRS 1	T_{j} (2.99)	2.2 km	MPC · JPL
891355	2014 XC_{50}	—	December 10, 2014	Mount Lemmon	Mount Lemmon Survey	·	1.5 km	MPC · JPL
891356	2014 XG_{50}	—	December 15, 2014	Mount Lemmon	Mount Lemmon Survey	H	380 m	MPC · JPL
891357	2014 XN_{50}	—	December 11, 2014	Mount Lemmon	Mount Lemmon Survey	EUN	830 m	MPC · JPL
891358	2014 XP_{50}	—	December 1, 2014	Haleakala	Pan-STARRS 1	·	1.7 km	MPC · JPL
891359	2014 XH_{52}	—	December 15, 2014	Mount Lemmon	Mount Lemmon Survey	·	1.3 km	MPC · JPL
891360	2014 XJ_{52}	—	December 10, 2014	Mount Lemmon	Mount Lemmon Survey	H	390 m	MPC · JPL
891361	2014 XY_{52}	—	December 11, 2014	Haleakala	Pan-STARRS 1	·	2.1 km	MPC · JPL
891362	2014 XJ_{53}	—	October 26, 1995	Kitt Peak	Spacewatch	H	370 m	MPC · JPL
891363	2014 XN_{53}	—	December 1, 2014	Haleakala	Pan-STARRS 1	H	320 m	MPC · JPL
891364	2014 XW_{54}	—	December 15, 2014	Mount Lemmon	Mount Lemmon Survey	·	1.9 km	MPC · JPL
891365	2014 XY_{54}	—	December 11, 2014	Haleakala	Pan-STARRS 1	PHO	580 m	MPC · JPL
891366	2014 XZ_{54}	—	December 3, 2014	Haleakala	Pan-STARRS 1	·	880 m	MPC · JPL
891367	2014 XM_{55}	—	December 10, 2014	Mount Lemmon	Mount Lemmon Survey	H	400 m	MPC · JPL
891368	2014 XM_{56}	—	December 3, 2014	Haleakala	Pan-STARRS 1	·	870 m	MPC · JPL
891369	2014 YW	—	December 20, 2014	Haleakala	Pan-STARRS 1	·	730 m	MPC · JPL
891370	2014 YO_{11}	—	December 20, 2014	Kitt Peak	Spacewatch	·	580 m	MPC · JPL
891371	2014 YY_{20}	—	December 9, 2014	Haleakala	Pan-STARRS 1	·	540 m	MPC · JPL
891372	2014 YX_{28}	—	December 24, 2014	Mount Lemmon	Mount Lemmon Survey	·	1.8 km	MPC · JPL
891373	2014 YF_{29}	—	February 11, 2004	Kitt Peak	Spacewatch	·	630 m	MPC · JPL
891374	2014 YP_{31}	—	December 25, 2014	Haleakala	Pan-STARRS 1	PHO	790 m	MPC · JPL
891375	2014 YL_{36}	—	November 18, 2014	Haleakala	Pan-STARRS 1	·	780 m	MPC · JPL
891376	2014 YT_{36}	—	December 26, 2014	Haleakala	Pan-STARRS 1	·	1.5 km	MPC · JPL
891377	2014 YL_{48}	—	December 12, 2014	Haleakala	Pan-STARRS 1	·	1.3 km	MPC · JPL
891378	2014 YN_{51}	—	August 28, 2005	Kitt Peak	Spacewatch	H	370 m	MPC · JPL
891379	2014 YL_{52}	—	December 29, 2014	Mount Lemmon	Mount Lemmon Survey	H	340 m	MPC · JPL
891380	2014 YY_{52}	—	December 21, 2014	Haleakala	Pan-STARRS 1	·	1.7 km	MPC · JPL
891381	2014 YO_{65}	—	December 29, 2014	Haleakala	Pan-STARRS 1	H	440 m	MPC · JPL
891382	2014 YH_{66}	—	December 25, 2014	Haleakala	Pan-STARRS 1	·	2.0 km	MPC · JPL
891383	2014 YP_{66}	—	December 16, 2014	Haleakala	Pan-STARRS 1	·	1.4 km	MPC · JPL
891384	2014 YW_{67}	—	December 29, 2014	Haleakala	Pan-STARRS 1	PHO	690 m	MPC · JPL
891385	2014 YC_{69}	—	December 18, 2014	Haleakala	Pan-STARRS 1	·	1.6 km	MPC · JPL
891386	2014 YL_{69}	—	December 28, 2014	Mount Lemmon	Mount Lemmon Survey	H	410 m	MPC · JPL
891387	2014 YQ_{69}	—	December 16, 2014	Haleakala	Pan-STARRS 1	·	1.9 km	MPC · JPL
891388	2014 YG_{70}	—	December 21, 2014	Mount Lemmon	Mount Lemmon Survey	·	2.2 km	MPC · JPL
891389	2014 YN_{70}	—	December 29, 2014	Haleakala	Pan-STARRS 1	·	2.0 km	MPC · JPL
891390	2014 YV_{72}	—	July 9, 2018	Haleakala	Pan-STARRS 1	·	2.7 km	MPC · JPL
891391	2014 YQ_{73}	—	December 26, 2014	Haleakala	Pan-STARRS 1	·	1.5 km	MPC · JPL
891392	2014 YV_{73}	—	December 26, 2014	Haleakala	Pan-STARRS 1	·	2.1 km	MPC · JPL
891393	2014 YJ_{74}	—	December 29, 2014	Haleakala	Pan-STARRS 1	THB	2.0 km	MPC · JPL
891394	2014 YM_{74}	—	December 29, 2014	Haleakala	Pan-STARRS 1	·	1.7 km	MPC · JPL
891395	2014 YP_{74}	—	December 21, 2014	Mount Lemmon	Mount Lemmon Survey	·	2.0 km	MPC · JPL
891396	2014 YF_{75}	—	December 25, 2014	Haleakala	Pan-STARRS 1	·	2.4 km	MPC · JPL
891397	2014 YK_{75}	—	December 18, 2014	Haleakala	Pan-STARRS 1	·	1.5 km	MPC · JPL
891398	2014 YX_{77}	—	December 20, 2014	Haleakala	Pan-STARRS 1	·	830 m	MPC · JPL
891399	2014 YQ_{79}	—	December 29, 2014	Haleakala	Pan-STARRS 1	TIR	1.5 km	MPC · JPL
891400	2014 YL_{80}	—	December 26, 2014	Haleakala	Pan-STARRS 1	·	620 m	MPC · JPL

== 891401–891500 ==
back to top

Designation			Discovery			Properties		Ref
Permanent	Provisional	Named after	Date	Site	Discoverer(s)	Category	Diam.	Ref
891401	2014 YB_{82}	—	December 26, 2014	Haleakala	Pan-STARRS 1	·	920 m	MPC · JPL
891402	2014 YC_{83}	—	December 20, 2014	Kitt Peak	Spacewatch	·	2.0 km	MPC · JPL
891403	2014 YH_{83}	—	December 16, 2014	Haleakala	Pan-STARRS 1	·	1.6 km	MPC · JPL
891404	2014 YJ_{83}	—	December 29, 2014	Haleakala	Pan-STARRS 1	·	1.4 km	MPC · JPL
891405	2014 YV_{83}	—	December 21, 2014	Haleakala	Pan-STARRS 1	·	1.5 km	MPC · JPL
891406	2014 YP_{84}	—	December 28, 2014	Mount Lemmon	Mount Lemmon Survey	·	670 m	MPC · JPL
891407	2014 YB_{85}	—	December 29, 2014	Catalina	CSS	·	1.9 km	MPC · JPL
891408	2014 YN_{86}	—	December 21, 2014	Haleakala	Pan-STARRS 1	·	1.9 km	MPC · JPL
891409	2014 YE_{87}	—	December 16, 2014	Haleakala	Pan-STARRS 1	·	1.7 km	MPC · JPL
891410	2014 YM_{87}	—	December 21, 2014	Haleakala	Pan-STARRS 1	TIR	1.4 km	MPC · JPL
891411	2014 YP_{87}	—	December 29, 2014	Haleakala	Pan-STARRS 1	·	1.6 km	MPC · JPL
891412	2014 YS_{87}	—	December 29, 2014	Haleakala	Pan-STARRS 1	·	2.2 km	MPC · JPL
891413	2014 YU_{87}	—	December 21, 2014	Haleakala	Pan-STARRS 1	·	2.0 km	MPC · JPL
891414	2014 YA_{88}	—	December 21, 2014	Haleakala	Pan-STARRS 1	·	690 m	MPC · JPL
891415	2014 YE_{88}	—	December 29, 2014	Haleakala	Pan-STARRS 1	H	340 m	MPC · JPL
891416	2014 YG_{88}	—	December 27, 2014	Haleakala	Pan-STARRS 1	·	1.9 km	MPC · JPL
891417	2014 YU_{88}	—	December 21, 2014	Mount Lemmon	Mount Lemmon Survey	MAS	430 m	MPC · JPL
891418	2014 YG_{89}	—	December 18, 2014	Haleakala	Pan-STARRS 1	·	1.7 km	MPC · JPL
891419	2014 YL_{89}	—	December 21, 2014	Haleakala	Pan-STARRS 1	EOS	1.3 km	MPC · JPL
891420	2014 YC_{90}	—	December 29, 2014	Haleakala	Pan-STARRS 1	·	2.1 km	MPC · JPL
891421	2014 YV_{90}	—	December 24, 2014	Mount Lemmon	Mount Lemmon Survey	THB	1.6 km	MPC · JPL
891422	2014 YB_{93}	—	December 26, 2014	Haleakala	Pan-STARRS 1	PHO	510 m	MPC · JPL
891423	2014 YN_{94}	—	December 29, 2014	Haleakala	Pan-STARRS 1	·	1.8 km	MPC · JPL
891424	2014 YO_{96}	—	December 29, 2014	Haleakala	Pan-STARRS 1	·	2.5 km	MPC · JPL
891425	2014 YJ_{98}	—	December 27, 2014	Haleakala	Pan-STARRS 1	H	350 m	MPC · JPL
891426	2014 YP_{99}	—	December 21, 2014	Haleakala	Pan-STARRS 1	EOS	1.1 km	MPC · JPL
891427	2014 YM_{101}	—	December 29, 2014	Haleakala	Pan-STARRS 1	·	1.8 km	MPC · JPL
891428	2014 YK_{105}	—	December 28, 2014	Mount Lemmon	Mount Lemmon Survey	T_{j} (2.98)	2.1 km	MPC · JPL
891429	2014 YY_{105}	—	December 29, 2014	Mount Lemmon	Mount Lemmon Survey	·	1.7 km	MPC · JPL
891430	2014 WT_{622}	—	November 26, 2014	Haleakala	Pan-STARRS 1	·	1.9 km	MPC · JPL
891431	2014 WZ_{622}	—	November 22, 2014	Mount Lemmon	Mount Lemmon Survey	·	1.7 km	MPC · JPL
891432	2014 WA_{623}	—	November 17, 2014	Haleakala	Pan-STARRS 1	·	1.5 km	MPC · JPL
891433	2015 AX_{1}	—	November 21, 2014	Haleakala	Pan-STARRS 1	THB	1.7 km	MPC · JPL
891434	2015 AL_{2}	—	November 1, 2014	Mount Lemmon	Mount Lemmon Survey	·	600 m	MPC · JPL
891435	2015 AP_{6}	—	August 15, 2013	Haleakala	Pan-STARRS 1	·	1.7 km	MPC · JPL
891436	2015 AG_{9}	—	December 1, 2014	Haleakala	Pan-STARRS 1	·	1.5 km	MPC · JPL
891437	2015 AS_{13}	—	December 26, 2014	Haleakala	Pan-STARRS 1	·	2.0 km	MPC · JPL
891438	2015 AP_{17}	—	March 29, 2012	Haleakala	Pan-STARRS 1	·	620 m	MPC · JPL
891439	2015 AT_{17}	—	January 9, 2015	Haleakala	Pan-STARRS 1	·	1.2 km	MPC · JPL
891440	2015 AB_{18}	—	November 4, 2014	Mount Lemmon	Mount Lemmon Survey	·	1.7 km	MPC · JPL
891441	2015 AQ_{19}	—	November 21, 2014	Haleakala	Pan-STARRS 1	H	390 m	MPC · JPL
891442	2015 AG_{26}	—	January 12, 2015	Haleakala	Pan-STARRS 1	·	1.6 km	MPC · JPL
891443	2015 AC_{28}	—	December 31, 2007	Kitt Peak	Spacewatch	·	610 m	MPC · JPL
891444	2015 AT_{29}	—	December 21, 2014	Haleakala	Pan-STARRS 1	·	1.4 km	MPC · JPL
891445	2015 AY_{30}	—	December 29, 2014	Mount Lemmon	Mount Lemmon Survey	·	1.7 km	MPC · JPL
891446	2015 AB_{31}	—	December 21, 2014	Haleakala	Pan-STARRS 1	·	600 m	MPC · JPL
891447	2015 AN_{31}	—	September 12, 2010	Kitt Peak	Spacewatch	·	670 m	MPC · JPL
891448	2015 AB_{34}	—	January 13, 2015	Haleakala	Pan-STARRS 1	·	620 m	MPC · JPL
891449	2015 AJ_{35}	—	December 21, 2014	Haleakala	Pan-STARRS 1	·	1.2 km	MPC · JPL
891450	2015 AY_{35}	—	January 13, 2015	Haleakala	Pan-STARRS 1	·	770 m	MPC · JPL
891451	2015 AD_{36}	—	December 21, 2014	Haleakala	Pan-STARRS 1	·	740 m	MPC · JPL
891452	2015 AB_{39}	—	December 21, 2014	Mount Lemmon	Mount Lemmon Survey	·	1.7 km	MPC · JPL
891453	2015 AH_{39}	—	December 21, 2014	Haleakala	Pan-STARRS 1	·	2.0 km	MPC · JPL
891454	2015 AK_{39}	—	December 21, 2014	Haleakala	Pan-STARRS 1	·	1.8 km	MPC · JPL
891455	2015 AN_{40}	—	December 21, 2014	Haleakala	Pan-STARRS 1	·	1.6 km	MPC · JPL
891456	2015 AX_{41}	—	January 13, 2015	Haleakala	Pan-STARRS 1	·	850 m	MPC · JPL
891457	2015 AA_{43}	—	November 30, 2014	Mount Lemmon	Mount Lemmon Survey	·	890 m	MPC · JPL
891458	2015 AJ_{44}	—	January 14, 2015	Haleakala	Pan-STARRS 1	ATE	120 m	MPC · JPL
891459	2015 AW_{57}	—	January 13, 2015	Haleakala	Pan-STARRS 1	EOS	1.4 km	MPC · JPL
891460	2015 AF_{60}	—	January 13, 2015	Haleakala	Pan-STARRS 1	·	1.9 km	MPC · JPL
891461	2015 AR_{65}	—	January 10, 2008	Mount Lemmon	Mount Lemmon Survey	·	680 m	MPC · JPL
891462	2015 AB_{67}	—	January 13, 2015	Haleakala	Pan-STARRS 1	·	590 m	MPC · JPL
891463	2015 AX_{68}	—	January 13, 2015	Haleakala	Pan-STARRS 1	·	930 m	MPC · JPL
891464	2015 AH_{75}	—	December 21, 2014	Haleakala	Pan-STARRS 1	·	1.8 km	MPC · JPL
891465	2015 AH_{77}	—	January 13, 2015	Haleakala	Pan-STARRS 1	·	1.6 km	MPC · JPL
891466	2015 AF_{81}	—	December 21, 2014	Haleakala	Pan-STARRS 1	·	1.6 km	MPC · JPL
891467	2015 AZ_{81}	—	December 21, 2014	Haleakala	Pan-STARRS 1	·	2.1 km	MPC · JPL
891468	2015 AK_{82}	—	December 21, 2014	Haleakala	Pan-STARRS 1	EUP	2.0 km	MPC · JPL
891469	2015 AS_{84}	—	December 21, 2014	Haleakala	Pan-STARRS 1	EOS	1.2 km	MPC · JPL
891470	2015 AW_{85}	—	January 13, 2015	Haleakala	Pan-STARRS 1	·	910 m	MPC · JPL
891471	2015 AP_{88}	—	January 13, 2015	Haleakala	Pan-STARRS 1	·	710 m	MPC · JPL
891472	2015 AW_{89}	—	March 28, 2012	Kitt Peak	Spacewatch	·	640 m	MPC · JPL
891473	2015 AP_{91}	—	November 2, 2010	Mount Lemmon	Mount Lemmon Survey	NYS	670 m	MPC · JPL
891474	2015 AE_{92}	—	October 25, 2008	Mount Lemmon	Mount Lemmon Survey	·	1.4 km	MPC · JPL
891475	2015 AO_{94}	—	October 3, 2014	Haleakala	Pan-STARRS 1	H	420 m	MPC · JPL
891476	2015 AB_{95}	—	December 16, 2014	Haleakala	Pan-STARRS 1	·	630 m	MPC · JPL
891477	2015 AY_{97}	—	January 14, 2015	Haleakala	Pan-STARRS 1	H	350 m	MPC · JPL
891478	2015 AA_{103}	—	November 11, 2010	Mount Lemmon	Mount Lemmon Survey	MAS	430 m	MPC · JPL
891479	2015 AL_{104}	—	December 21, 2014	Haleakala	Pan-STARRS 1	·	2.1 km	MPC · JPL
891480	2015 AB_{105}	—	December 21, 2014	Mount Lemmon	Mount Lemmon Survey	·	1.4 km	MPC · JPL
891481	2015 AY_{114}	—	December 21, 2014	Haleakala	Pan-STARRS 1	·	1.9 km	MPC · JPL
891482	2015 AN_{124}	—	January 14, 2015	Haleakala	Pan-STARRS 1	·	700 m	MPC · JPL
891483	2015 AQ_{124}	—	November 9, 2008	Kitt Peak	Spacewatch	·	1.5 km	MPC · JPL
891484	2015 AA_{127}	—	January 14, 2015	Haleakala	Pan-STARRS 1	·	1.7 km	MPC · JPL
891485	2015 AG_{128}	—	March 25, 2008	Kitt Peak	Spacewatch	MAS	510 m	MPC · JPL
891486	2015 AL_{128}	—	September 6, 2012	Mount Lemmon	Mount Lemmon Survey	ELF	2.5 km	MPC · JPL
891487	2015 AG_{131}	—	December 21, 2014	Haleakala	Pan-STARRS 1	HYG	1.8 km	MPC · JPL
891488	2015 AO_{144}	—	December 21, 2014	Haleakala	Pan-STARRS 1	·	1.1 km	MPC · JPL
891489	2015 AP_{145}	—	January 14, 2015	Haleakala	Pan-STARRS 1	·	1.7 km	MPC · JPL
891490	2015 AK_{150}	—	December 21, 2014	Haleakala	Pan-STARRS 1	·	2.1 km	MPC · JPL
891491	2015 AY_{156}	—	January 14, 2015	Haleakala	Pan-STARRS 1	·	1.8 km	MPC · JPL
891492	2015 AN_{158}	—	December 21, 2014	Haleakala	Pan-STARRS 1	·	1.9 km	MPC · JPL
891493	2015 AS_{161}	—	January 14, 2015	Haleakala	Pan-STARRS 1	·	1.6 km	MPC · JPL
891494	2015 AZ_{165}	—	December 21, 2014	Mount Lemmon	Mount Lemmon Survey	·	2.0 km	MPC · JPL
891495	2015 AR_{167}	—	January 14, 2015	Haleakala	Pan-STARRS 1	·	1.4 km	MPC · JPL
891496	2015 AE_{169}	—	January 14, 2015	Haleakala	Pan-STARRS 1	·	1.5 km	MPC · JPL
891497	2015 AJ_{171}	—	January 14, 2015	Haleakala	Pan-STARRS 1	·	2.2 km	MPC · JPL
891498	2015 AP_{172}	—	January 14, 2015	Haleakala	Pan-STARRS 1	·	1.6 km	MPC · JPL
891499	2015 AN_{173}	—	August 9, 2013	Kitt Peak	Spacewatch	·	870 m	MPC · JPL
891500	2015 AO_{174}	—	January 14, 2015	Haleakala	Pan-STARRS 1	·	520 m	MPC · JPL

== 891501–891600 ==
back to top

Designation			Discovery			Properties		Ref
Permanent	Provisional	Named after	Date	Site	Discoverer(s)	Category	Diam.	Ref
891501	2015 AJ_{180}	—	July 13, 2013	Haleakala	Pan-STARRS 1	·	750 m	MPC · JPL
891502	2015 AZ_{180}	—	February 10, 2008	Kitt Peak	Spacewatch	ERI	880 m	MPC · JPL
891503	2015 AZ_{183}	—	September 11, 2010	Mount Lemmon	Mount Lemmon Survey	·	820 m	MPC · JPL
891504	2015 AP_{194}	—	March 11, 2008	Mount Lemmon	Mount Lemmon Survey	MAS	460 m	MPC · JPL
891505	2015 AW_{201}	—	January 13, 2011	Mount Lemmon	Mount Lemmon Survey	·	730 m	MPC · JPL
891506	2015 AU_{203}	—	November 12, 2010	Mount Lemmon	Mount Lemmon Survey	NYS	710 m	MPC · JPL
891507	2015 AY_{203}	—	November 20, 2014	Haleakala	Pan-STARRS 1	·	1.4 km	MPC · JPL
891508	2015 AV_{204}	—	September 18, 2010	Mount Lemmon	Mount Lemmon Survey	·	620 m	MPC · JPL
891509	2015 AY_{211}	—	December 16, 2014	Haleakala	Pan-STARRS 1	L5	7.3 km	MPC · JPL
891510	2015 AQ_{212}	—	November 22, 2014	Haleakala	Pan-STARRS 1	·	2.0 km	MPC · JPL
891511	2015 AM_{215}	—	November 8, 2008	Kitt Peak	Spacewatch	·	2.5 km	MPC · JPL
891512	2015 AA_{218}	—	January 15, 2015	Haleakala	Pan-STARRS 1	·	1.7 km	MPC · JPL
891513	2015 AN_{220}	—	November 22, 2014	Haleakala	Pan-STARRS 1	·	1.8 km	MPC · JPL
891514	2015 AP_{221}	—	January 15, 2015	Haleakala	Pan-STARRS 1	·	2.0 km	MPC · JPL
891515	2015 AQ_{225}	—	January 15, 2015	Haleakala	Pan-STARRS 1	·	1.9 km	MPC · JPL
891516	2015 AU_{228}	—	January 15, 2015	Haleakala	Pan-STARRS 1	·	790 m	MPC · JPL
891517	2015 AW_{235}	—	November 7, 2013	Kitt Peak	Spacewatch	·	2.1 km	MPC · JPL
891518	2015 AO_{237}	—	August 15, 2013	Haleakala	Pan-STARRS 1	·	890 m	MPC · JPL
891519	2015 AH_{244}	—	January 15, 2015	Haleakala	Pan-STARRS 1	·	2.3 km	MPC · JPL
891520	2015 AE_{247}	—	January 13, 2010	Mount Lemmon	Mount Lemmon Survey	·	1.6 km	MPC · JPL
891521	2015 AL_{248}	—	February 24, 2008	Mount Lemmon	Mount Lemmon Survey	·	550 m	MPC · JPL
891522	2015 AA_{249}	—	January 13, 2015	Haleakala	Pan-STARRS 1	·	2.0 km	MPC · JPL
891523	2015 AD_{253}	—	November 4, 2010	Mount Lemmon	Mount Lemmon Survey	·	670 m	MPC · JPL
891524	2015 AM_{260}	—	March 5, 2008	Kitt Peak	Spacewatch	·	880 m	MPC · JPL
891525	2015 AO_{266}	—	January 28, 2007	Mount Lemmon	Mount Lemmon Survey	·	830 m	MPC · JPL
891526	2015 AK_{268}	—	January 13, 2015	Haleakala	Pan-STARRS 1	·	1.9 km	MPC · JPL
891527	2015 AJ_{271}	—	January 13, 2015	Haleakala	Pan-STARRS 1	THM	1.3 km	MPC · JPL
891528	2015 AC_{278}	—	January 15, 2015	Haleakala	Pan-STARRS 1	·	960 m	MPC · JPL
891529	2015 AE_{280}	—	January 15, 2015	Haleakala	Pan-STARRS 1	EUP	2.2 km	MPC · JPL
891530	2015 AN_{282}	—	January 11, 2015	Haleakala	Pan-STARRS 1	H	280 m	MPC · JPL
891531	2015 AP_{282}	—	November 30, 2014	Haleakala	Pan-STARRS 1	H	360 m	MPC · JPL
891532	2015 AZ_{282}	—	January 15, 2015	Haleakala	Pan-STARRS 1	·	1.7 km	MPC · JPL
891533	2015 AE_{283}	—	April 11, 2010	Mount Lemmon	Mount Lemmon Survey	T_{j} (2.98)	2.8 km	MPC · JPL
891534	2015 AU_{285}	—	January 14, 2015	Haleakala	Pan-STARRS 1	·	2.0 km	MPC · JPL
891535	2015 AK_{286}	—	September 3, 2013	Mount Lemmon	Mount Lemmon Survey	·	2.0 km	MPC · JPL
891536	2015 AD_{287}	—	January 8, 2015	Haleakala	Pan-STARRS 1	·	1.4 km	MPC · JPL
891537	2015 AO_{288}	—	October 26, 2014	Mount Lemmon	Mount Lemmon Survey	·	600 m	MPC · JPL
891538	2015 AH_{289}	—	January 17, 2007	Kitt Peak	Spacewatch	·	850 m	MPC · JPL
891539	2015 AM_{294}	—	January 15, 2015	Haleakala	Pan-STARRS 1	H	330 m	MPC · JPL
891540	2015 AU_{294}	—	January 13, 2015	Haleakala	Pan-STARRS 1	·	2.1 km	MPC · JPL
891541	2015 AC_{295}	—	June 29, 2016	Haleakala	Pan-STARRS 1	H	510 m	MPC · JPL
891542	2015 AF_{295}	—	June 16, 2018	Haleakala	Pan-STARRS 1	EOS	1.2 km	MPC · JPL
891543	2015 AP_{295}	—	January 12, 2015	Haleakala	Pan-STARRS 1	·	1.8 km	MPC · JPL
891544	2015 AZ_{295}	—	November 6, 2008	Mount Lemmon	Mount Lemmon Survey	TIR	1.8 km	MPC · JPL
891545	2015 AK_{296}	—	January 15, 2015	Haleakala	Pan-STARRS 1	·	2.1 km	MPC · JPL
891546	2015 AY_{296}	—	January 15, 2015	Haleakala	Pan-STARRS 1	·	850 m	MPC · JPL
891547	2015 AO_{297}	—	January 14, 2015	Haleakala	Pan-STARRS 1	·	1.5 km	MPC · JPL
891548	2015 AE_{298}	—	January 12, 2015	Haleakala	Pan-STARRS 1	T_{j} (2.97)	2.7 km	MPC · JPL
891549	2015 AK_{299}	—	January 15, 2015	Haleakala	Pan-STARRS 1	·	1.2 km	MPC · JPL
891550	2015 AN_{301}	—	January 15, 2015	Haleakala	Pan-STARRS 1	EUP	2.0 km	MPC · JPL
891551	2015 AQ_{302}	—	January 13, 2015	Haleakala	Pan-STARRS 1	·	2.1 km	MPC · JPL
891552	2015 AR_{302}	—	January 14, 2015	Haleakala	Pan-STARRS 1	·	1.8 km	MPC · JPL
891553	2015 AG_{303}	—	January 15, 2015	Haleakala	Pan-STARRS 1	·	2.8 km	MPC · JPL
891554	2015 AT_{303}	—	January 15, 2015	Haleakala	Pan-STARRS 1	·	2.3 km	MPC · JPL
891555	2015 AX_{304}	—	January 9, 2015	Haleakala	Pan-STARRS 1	·	750 m	MPC · JPL
891556	2015 AA_{305}	—	November 22, 2014	Mount Lemmon	Mount Lemmon Survey	·	2.0 km	MPC · JPL
891557	2015 AC_{306}	—	January 14, 2015	Haleakala	Pan-STARRS 1	·	840 m	MPC · JPL
891558	2015 AR_{306}	—	January 15, 2015	Haleakala	Pan-STARRS 1	·	1.7 km	MPC · JPL
891559	2015 AO_{307}	—	January 15, 2015	La Palma	EURONEAR	EUN	840 m	MPC · JPL
891560	2015 AK_{310}	—	January 14, 2015	Haleakala	Pan-STARRS 1	·	1.1 km	MPC · JPL
891561	2015 BA_{1}	—	November 22, 2014	Haleakala	Pan-STARRS 1	·	1.9 km	MPC · JPL
891562	2015 BZ_{2}	—	January 16, 2015	Haleakala	Pan-STARRS 1	·	1.4 km	MPC · JPL
891563	2015 BA_{6}	—	January 16, 2015	Kitt Peak	Spacewatch	·	2.2 km	MPC · JPL
891564	2015 BX_{7}	—	December 21, 2014	Haleakala	Pan-STARRS 1	LIX	2.3 km	MPC · JPL
891565	2015 BJ_{15}	—	November 12, 2010	Mount Lemmon	Mount Lemmon Survey	MAS	490 m	MPC · JPL
891566	2015 BM_{15}	—	January 16, 2015	Mount Lemmon	Mount Lemmon Survey	·	760 m	MPC · JPL
891567	2015 BJ_{17}	—	September 1, 2013	Mount Lemmon	Mount Lemmon Survey	·	1.6 km	MPC · JPL
891568	2015 BS_{17}	—	January 16, 2015	Mount Lemmon	Mount Lemmon Survey	NYS	790 m	MPC · JPL
891569	2015 BG_{18}	—	January 16, 2015	Mount Lemmon	Mount Lemmon Survey	·	900 m	MPC · JPL
891570	2015 BH_{18}	—	March 13, 2008	Kitt Peak	Spacewatch	·	670 m	MPC · JPL
891571	2015 BQ_{18}	—	December 20, 2009	Mount Lemmon	Mount Lemmon Survey	·	1.1 km	MPC · JPL
891572	2015 BB_{19}	—	December 26, 2014	Haleakala	Pan-STARRS 1	·	1.5 km	MPC · JPL
891573	2015 BU_{33}	—	January 16, 2015	Haleakala	Pan-STARRS 1	·	1.7 km	MPC · JPL
891574	2015 BU_{34}	—	October 2, 2006	Mount Lemmon	Mount Lemmon Survey	NYS	710 m	MPC · JPL
891575	2015 BK_{36}	—	January 4, 2012	Mount Lemmon	Mount Lemmon Survey	H	410 m	MPC · JPL
891576	2015 BO_{37}	—	January 17, 2015	Charleston	International Astronomical Search Collaboration	·	1.6 km	MPC · JPL
891577	2015 BT_{37}	—	December 29, 2014	Haleakala	Pan-STARRS 1	·	1.5 km	MPC · JPL
891578	2015 BT_{38}	—	December 29, 2014	Haleakala	Pan-STARRS 1	·	660 m	MPC · JPL
891579	2015 BV_{40}	—	November 21, 2014	Haleakala	Pan-STARRS 1	·	650 m	MPC · JPL
891580	2015 BU_{42}	—	January 14, 2011	Mount Lemmon	Mount Lemmon Survey	·	650 m	MPC · JPL
891581	2015 BM_{50}	—	January 17, 2015	Haleakala	Pan-STARRS 1	·	1.8 km	MPC · JPL
891582	2015 BT_{50}	—	January 17, 2015	Haleakala	Pan-STARRS 1	·	1.1 km	MPC · JPL
891583	2015 BD_{53}	—	November 25, 2014	Haleakala	Pan-STARRS 1	T_{j} (2.98)	1.6 km	MPC · JPL
891584	2015 BA_{67}	—	October 9, 2013	Mount Lemmon	Mount Lemmon Survey	·	1.5 km	MPC · JPL
891585	2015 BC_{67}	—	January 17, 2015	Haleakala	Pan-STARRS 1	·	2.1 km	MPC · JPL
891586	2015 BD_{67}	—	January 17, 2015	Haleakala	Pan-STARRS 1	·	1.8 km	MPC · JPL
891587	2015 BS_{70}	—	January 17, 2015	Haleakala	Pan-STARRS 1	EOS	1.3 km	MPC · JPL
891588	2015 BU_{72}	—	January 17, 2015	Haleakala	Pan-STARRS 1	·	2.0 km	MPC · JPL
891589	2015 BO_{76}	—	January 17, 2015	Haleakala	Pan-STARRS 1	·	1.5 km	MPC · JPL
891590	2015 BS_{78}	—	November 17, 2014	Haleakala	Pan-STARRS 1	·	2.1 km	MPC · JPL
891591	2015 BX_{79}	—	January 18, 2015	Haleakala	Pan-STARRS 1	·	1.8 km	MPC · JPL
891592	2015 BX_{82}	—	January 18, 2015	Mount Lemmon	Mount Lemmon Survey	·	720 m	MPC · JPL
891593	2015 BV_{84}	—	January 18, 2015	Mount Lemmon	Mount Lemmon Survey	·	1.4 km	MPC · JPL
891594	2015 BO_{90}	—	January 18, 2015	Haleakala	Pan-STARRS 1	EOS	1.5 km	MPC · JPL
891595	2015 BW_{95}	—	February 11, 2008	Mount Lemmon	Mount Lemmon Survey	·	750 m	MPC · JPL
891596	2015 BN_{98}	—	November 26, 2014	Haleakala	Pan-STARRS 1	·	1.7 km	MPC · JPL
891597	2015 BB_{102}	—	January 16, 2015	Kitt Peak	Spacewatch	H	350 m	MPC · JPL
891598	2015 BC_{110}	—	November 10, 2010	Kitt Peak	Spacewatch	MAS	440 m	MPC · JPL
891599	2015 BY_{113}	—	January 17, 2015	Mount Lemmon	Mount Lemmon Survey	·	1.9 km	MPC · JPL
891600	2015 BF_{115}	—	January 17, 2015	Mount Lemmon	Mount Lemmon Survey	·	1.4 km	MPC · JPL

== 891601–891700 ==
back to top

Designation			Discovery			Properties		Ref
Permanent	Provisional	Named after	Date	Site	Discoverer(s)	Category	Diam.	Ref
891601	2015 BJ_{117}	—	January 17, 2015	Mount Lemmon	Mount Lemmon Survey	·	1.9 km	MPC · JPL
891602	2015 BQ_{120}	—	January 17, 2015	Haleakala	Pan-STARRS 1	·	1.7 km	MPC · JPL
891603	2015 BJ_{122}	—	January 17, 2015	Haleakala	Pan-STARRS 1	·	1.8 km	MPC · JPL
891604	2015 BO_{122}	—	January 17, 2015	Haleakala	Pan-STARRS 1	·	1.6 km	MPC · JPL
891605	2015 BQ_{125}	—	January 17, 2015	Haleakala	Pan-STARRS 1	EOS	1.3 km	MPC · JPL
891606	2015 BP_{126}	—	January 17, 2015	Haleakala	Pan-STARRS 1	·	1.7 km	MPC · JPL
891607	2015 BP_{128}	—	January 17, 2015	Haleakala	Pan-STARRS 1	·	1.8 km	MPC · JPL
891608	2015 BS_{128}	—	January 17, 2015	Haleakala	Pan-STARRS 1	·	900 m	MPC · JPL
891609	2015 BJ_{131}	—	January 17, 2015	Haleakala	Pan-STARRS 1	·	2.3 km	MPC · JPL
891610	2015 BD_{132}	—	March 14, 2010	Mount Lemmon	Mount Lemmon Survey	·	1.2 km	MPC · JPL
891611	2015 BM_{134}	—	May 4, 2000	Apache Point	SDSS	·	1.8 km	MPC · JPL
891612	2015 BO_{134}	—	November 3, 2014	Mount Lemmon	Mount Lemmon Survey	·	1.7 km	MPC · JPL
891613	2015 BJ_{139}	—	September 13, 2012	Mount Lemmon	Mount Lemmon Survey	·	2.2 km	MPC · JPL
891614	2015 BV_{141}	—	September 14, 2013	Haleakala	Pan-STARRS 1	LIX	2.0 km	MPC · JPL
891615	2015 BJ_{142}	—	December 18, 2014	Haleakala	Pan-STARRS 1	H	370 m	MPC · JPL
891616	2015 BV_{143}	—	March 27, 2011	Mount Lemmon	Mount Lemmon Survey	·	1.1 km	MPC · JPL
891617	2015 BE_{148}	—	January 17, 2015	Haleakala	Pan-STARRS 1	·	1.5 km	MPC · JPL
891618	2015 BM_{152}	—	January 17, 2015	Haleakala	Pan-STARRS 1	·	630 m	MPC · JPL
891619	2015 BS_{157}	—	January 17, 2015	Haleakala	Pan-STARRS 1	·	1.9 km	MPC · JPL
891620	2015 BJ_{159}	—	January 17, 2015	Haleakala	Pan-STARRS 1	TIR	1.5 km	MPC · JPL
891621	2015 BN_{159}	—	January 17, 2015	Haleakala	Pan-STARRS 1	EOS	1.3 km	MPC · JPL
891622	2015 BV_{159}	—	January 17, 2015	Haleakala	Pan-STARRS 1	·	690 m	MPC · JPL
891623	2015 BP_{162}	—	January 17, 2015	Haleakala	Pan-STARRS 1	·	2.1 km	MPC · JPL
891624	2015 BU_{168}	—	April 1, 2008	Kitt Peak	Spacewatch	NYS	830 m	MPC · JPL
891625	2015 BM_{171}	—	November 11, 2013	Mount Lemmon	Mount Lemmon Survey	EOS	1.3 km	MPC · JPL
891626	2015 BO_{172}	—	January 17, 2015	Haleakala	Pan-STARRS 1	·	1.9 km	MPC · JPL
891627	2015 BJ_{175}	—	January 17, 2015	Haleakala	Pan-STARRS 1	·	1.8 km	MPC · JPL
891628	2015 BR_{178}	—	January 17, 2015	Haleakala	Pan-STARRS 1	·	2.0 km	MPC · JPL
891629	2015 BG_{180}	—	January 17, 2015	Haleakala	Pan-STARRS 1	·	2.0 km	MPC · JPL
891630	2015 BA_{181}	—	September 12, 2013	Kitt Peak	Spacewatch	TIR	1.9 km	MPC · JPL
891631	2015 BM_{185}	—	January 17, 2015	Haleakala	Pan-STARRS 1	·	2.1 km	MPC · JPL
891632	2015 BT_{190}	—	January 17, 2015	Haleakala	Pan-STARRS 1	·	1.9 km	MPC · JPL
891633	2015 BH_{192}	—	January 17, 2015	Haleakala	Pan-STARRS 1	·	1.9 km	MPC · JPL
891634	2015 BM_{192}	—	January 17, 2015	Haleakala	Pan-STARRS 1	NYS	630 m	MPC · JPL
891635	2015 BW_{194}	—	January 17, 2015	Haleakala	Pan-STARRS 1	·	2.1 km	MPC · JPL
891636	2015 BC_{195}	—	January 17, 2015	Haleakala	Pan-STARRS 1	(5)	720 m	MPC · JPL
891637	2015 BP_{195}	—	January 17, 2015	Haleakala	Pan-STARRS 1	VER	1.7 km	MPC · JPL
891638	2015 BB_{198}	—	September 15, 2013	Mount Lemmon	Mount Lemmon Survey	·	1.4 km	MPC · JPL
891639	2015 BH_{199}	—	November 13, 2010	Kitt Peak	Spacewatch	·	680 m	MPC · JPL
891640	2015 BN_{202}	—	January 17, 2015	Haleakala	Pan-STARRS 1	·	2.5 km	MPC · JPL
891641	2015 BX_{202}	—	December 15, 2014	Haleakala	Pan-STARRS 1	H	420 m	MPC · JPL
891642	2015 BB_{203}	—	January 18, 2015	ESA OGS	ESA OGS	·	850 m	MPC · JPL
891643	2015 BH_{209}	—	January 18, 2015	Haleakala	Pan-STARRS 1	·	2.0 km	MPC · JPL
891644	2015 BY_{212}	—	January 18, 2015	Mount Lemmon	Mount Lemmon Survey	·	1.7 km	MPC · JPL
891645	2015 BA_{214}	—	October 12, 2013	Mount Lemmon	Mount Lemmon Survey	EUP	3.0 km	MPC · JPL
891646	2015 BP_{214}	—	January 18, 2015	Mount Lemmon	Mount Lemmon Survey	·	2.1 km	MPC · JPL
891647	2015 BQ_{215}	—	December 26, 2014	Haleakala	Pan-STARRS 1	·	1.6 km	MPC · JPL
891648	2015 BY_{216}	—	December 26, 2014	Haleakala	Pan-STARRS 1	·	1.3 km	MPC · JPL
891649	2015 BH_{218}	—	December 1, 2014	Mount Lemmon	Mount Lemmon Survey	·	1.4 km	MPC · JPL
891650	2015 BC_{220}	—	December 26, 2014	Haleakala	Pan-STARRS 1	·	2.1 km	MPC · JPL
891651	2015 BC_{226}	—	September 29, 2010	Kitt Peak	Spacewatch	MAS	420 m	MPC · JPL
891652	2015 BM_{227}	—	December 26, 2014	Haleakala	Pan-STARRS 1	·	1.3 km	MPC · JPL
891653	2015 BU_{230}	—	April 18, 2001	Kitt Peak	Spacewatch	·	820 m	MPC · JPL
891654	2015 BK_{231}	—	March 30, 2012	Kitt Peak	Spacewatch	·	780 m	MPC · JPL
891655	2015 BQ_{231}	—	August 14, 2013	Haleakala	Pan-STARRS 1	THB	2.1 km	MPC · JPL
891656	2015 BF_{232}	—	October 31, 2010	ESA OGS	ESA OGS	·	700 m	MPC · JPL
891657	2015 BS_{232}	—	January 18, 2015	Haleakala	Pan-STARRS 1	EOS	1.2 km	MPC · JPL
891658	2015 BA_{233}	—	January 18, 2015	Haleakala	Pan-STARRS 1	·	1.7 km	MPC · JPL
891659	2015 BU_{235}	—	November 21, 2014	Haleakala	Pan-STARRS 1	·	410 m	MPC · JPL
891660	2015 BB_{238}	—	February 5, 2011	Mount Lemmon	Mount Lemmon Survey	·	800 m	MPC · JPL
891661	2015 BE_{239}	—	January 18, 2015	Mount Lemmon	Mount Lemmon Survey	·	1.8 km	MPC · JPL
891662	2015 BJ_{239}	—	September 23, 2008	Mount Lemmon	Mount Lemmon Survey	·	1.7 km	MPC · JPL
891663	2015 BO_{241}	—	March 12, 2010	Kitt Peak	Spacewatch	·	1.6 km	MPC · JPL
891664	2015 BD_{245}	—	January 18, 2015	Haleakala	Pan-STARRS 1	·	1.7 km	MPC · JPL
891665	2015 BM_{246}	—	January 18, 2015	Haleakala	Pan-STARRS 1	·	1.9 km	MPC · JPL
891666	2015 BR_{247}	—	March 15, 2010	Mount Lemmon	Mount Lemmon Survey	·	1.7 km	MPC · JPL
891667	2015 BU_{247}	—	March 10, 2008	Kitt Peak	Spacewatch	·	620 m	MPC · JPL
891668	2015 BQ_{248}	—	January 18, 2015	Haleakala	Pan-STARRS 1	·	1.8 km	MPC · JPL
891669	2015 BU_{249}	—	March 8, 2008	Mount Lemmon	Mount Lemmon Survey	NYS	690 m	MPC · JPL
891670	2015 BA_{251}	—	January 18, 2015	Haleakala	Pan-STARRS 1	·	680 m	MPC · JPL
891671	2015 BK_{252}	—	January 18, 2015	Haleakala	Pan-STARRS 1	·	1.8 km	MPC · JPL
891672	2015 BQ_{260}	—	December 18, 2014	Haleakala	Pan-STARRS 1	·	1.2 km	MPC · JPL
891673	2015 BJ_{261}	—	January 18, 2015	Mount Lemmon	Mount Lemmon Survey	·	1.8 km	MPC · JPL
891674	2015 BJ_{262}	—	March 10, 2008	Kitt Peak	Spacewatch	·	650 m	MPC · JPL
891675	2015 BN_{262}	—	January 18, 2015	Mount Lemmon	Mount Lemmon Survey	H	350 m	MPC · JPL
891676	2015 BW_{262}	—	January 18, 2015	Haleakala	Pan-STARRS 1	·	1.1 km	MPC · JPL
891677	2015 BN_{264}	—	January 18, 2015	Haleakala	Pan-STARRS 1	·	1.6 km	MPC · JPL
891678	2015 BE_{265}	—	January 19, 2015	Mount Lemmon	Mount Lemmon Survey	·	2.2 km	MPC · JPL
891679	2015 BW_{265}	—	January 19, 2015	Mount Lemmon	Mount Lemmon Survey	·	1.9 km	MPC · JPL
891680	2015 BJ_{273}	—	December 16, 2014	Haleakala	Pan-STARRS 1	H	410 m	MPC · JPL
891681	2015 BL_{274}	—	January 19, 2015	Kitt Peak	Spacewatch	HYG	2.0 km	MPC · JPL
891682	2015 BU_{277}	—	January 19, 2015	Mount Lemmon	Mount Lemmon Survey	·	960 m	MPC · JPL
891683	2015 BN_{279}	—	January 19, 2015	Haleakala	Pan-STARRS 1	·	2.1 km	MPC · JPL
891684	2015 BQ_{280}	—	January 19, 2015	Haleakala	Pan-STARRS 1	THB	1.6 km	MPC · JPL
891685	2015 BG_{282}	—	January 19, 2015	Haleakala	Pan-STARRS 1	·	1.5 km	MPC · JPL
891686	2015 BZ_{283}	—	October 5, 2013	Haleakala	Pan-STARRS 1	·	1.8 km	MPC · JPL
891687	2015 BA_{284}	—	March 21, 2010	Mount Lemmon	Mount Lemmon Survey	·	2.0 km	MPC · JPL
891688	2015 BH_{284}	—	January 19, 2015	Haleakala	Pan-STARRS 1	·	1.7 km	MPC · JPL
891689	2015 BN_{287}	—	January 19, 2015	Haleakala	Pan-STARRS 1	·	2.3 km	MPC · JPL
891690	2015 BK_{288}	—	January 19, 2015	Haleakala	Pan-STARRS 1	·	1.8 km	MPC · JPL
891691	2015 BM_{288}	—	January 19, 2015	Haleakala	Pan-STARRS 1	·	1.6 km	MPC · JPL
891692	2015 BC_{293}	—	January 19, 2015	Haleakala	Pan-STARRS 1	PHO	590 m	MPC · JPL
891693	2015 BG_{294}	—	January 19, 2015	Haleakala	Pan-STARRS 1	·	1.5 km	MPC · JPL
891694	2015 BR_{294}	—	March 4, 2008	Kitt Peak	Spacewatch	PHO	590 m	MPC · JPL
891695	2015 BO_{296}	—	January 19, 2015	Haleakala	Pan-STARRS 1	·	2.2 km	MPC · JPL
891696	2015 BE_{298}	—	January 19, 2015	Haleakala	Pan-STARRS 1	·	830 m	MPC · JPL
891697	2015 BM_{298}	—	January 15, 2007	Mauna Kea	P. A. Wiegert	NYS	730 m	MPC · JPL
891698	2015 BN_{298}	—	January 19, 2015	Haleakala	Pan-STARRS 1	T_{j} (2.98)	2.0 km	MPC · JPL
891699	2015 BW_{298}	—	January 19, 2015	Haleakala	Pan-STARRS 1	·	1.8 km	MPC · JPL
891700	2015 BD_{300}	—	January 19, 2015	Haleakala	Pan-STARRS 1	·	890 m	MPC · JPL

== 891701–891800 ==
back to top

Designation			Discovery			Properties		Ref
Permanent	Provisional	Named after	Date	Site	Discoverer(s)	Category	Diam.	Ref
891701	2015 BA_{307}	—	February 18, 2010	Mount Lemmon	Mount Lemmon Survey	LIX	2.1 km	MPC · JPL
891702	2015 BH_{307}	—	November 30, 2010	Mount Lemmon	Mount Lemmon Survey	·	770 m	MPC · JPL
891703	2015 BM_{308}	—	January 20, 2015	Kitt Peak	Spacewatch	·	2.1 km	MPC · JPL
891704	2015 BR_{309}	—	January 20, 2015	Mount Lemmon	Mount Lemmon Survey	·	2.2 km	MPC · JPL
891705	2015 BF_{312}	—	October 29, 2014	Haleakala	Pan-STARRS 1	·	1.6 km	MPC · JPL
891706	2015 BG_{312}	—	September 18, 2014	Haleakala	Pan-STARRS 1	·	2.3 km	MPC · JPL
891707	2015 BK_{312}	—	March 11, 2007	Kitt Peak	Spacewatch	·	840 m	MPC · JPL
891708	2015 BK_{315}	—	December 29, 2014	Haleakala	Pan-STARRS 1	·	1.6 km	MPC · JPL
891709	2015 BG_{326}	—	January 17, 2015	Haleakala	Pan-STARRS 1	LIX	2.0 km	MPC · JPL
891710	2015 BK_{327}	—	January 17, 2015	Haleakala	Pan-STARRS 1	·	1.8 km	MPC · JPL
891711	2015 BA_{331}	—	January 17, 2015	Haleakala	Pan-STARRS 1	·	1.4 km	MPC · JPL
891712	2015 BD_{334}	—	August 9, 2013	Haleakala	Pan-STARRS 1	V	390 m	MPC · JPL
891713	2015 BT_{340}	—	January 17, 2015	Haleakala	Pan-STARRS 1	LIX	1.8 km	MPC · JPL
891714	2015 BF_{342}	—	January 17, 2015	Haleakala	Pan-STARRS 1	·	2.1 km	MPC · JPL
891715	2015 BL_{342}	—	January 17, 2015	Haleakala	Pan-STARRS 1	·	2.0 km	MPC · JPL
891716	2015 BQ_{349}	—	January 18, 2015	Haleakala	Pan-STARRS 1	EOS	1.2 km	MPC · JPL
891717	2015 BU_{349}	—	January 16, 2015	Mount Lemmon	Mount Lemmon Survey	·	1.5 km	MPC · JPL
891718	2015 BB_{356}	—	March 30, 2008	Kitt Peak	Spacewatch	·	780 m	MPC · JPL
891719	2015 BF_{359}	—	February 13, 2010	Mount Lemmon	Mount Lemmon Survey	·	1.6 km	MPC · JPL
891720	2015 BF_{363}	—	December 26, 2014	Haleakala	Pan-STARRS 1	H	390 m	MPC · JPL
891721	2015 BP_{363}	—	October 31, 2008	Kitt Peak	Spacewatch	·	1.4 km	MPC · JPL
891722	2015 BA_{366}	—	January 20, 2015	Haleakala	Pan-STARRS 1	·	1.7 km	MPC · JPL
891723	2015 BA_{371}	—	January 20, 2015	Haleakala	Pan-STARRS 1	·	1.7 km	MPC · JPL
891724	2015 BM_{374}	—	December 26, 2014	Haleakala	Pan-STARRS 1	MAS	420 m	MPC · JPL
891725	2015 BG_{377}	—	January 11, 2010	Kitt Peak	Spacewatch	EOS	1.1 km	MPC · JPL
891726	2015 BH_{379}	—	January 20, 2015	Haleakala	Pan-STARRS 1	·	2.3 km	MPC · JPL
891727	2015 BS_{381}	—	February 22, 2004	Kitt Peak	Spacewatch	·	630 m	MPC · JPL
891728	2015 BU_{390}	—	January 17, 2015	Haleakala	Pan-STARRS 1	PHO	720 m	MPC · JPL
891729	2015 BF_{396}	—	January 20, 2015	Haleakala	Pan-STARRS 1	·	770 m	MPC · JPL
891730	2015 BB_{398}	—	January 20, 2015	Kitt Peak	Spacewatch	·	1.4 km	MPC · JPL
891731	2015 BT_{402}	—	September 24, 2012	Mount Lemmon	Mount Lemmon Survey	·	2.5 km	MPC · JPL
891732	2015 BR_{403}	—	January 20, 2015	Haleakala	Pan-STARRS 1	·	2.0 km	MPC · JPL
891733	2015 BD_{404}	—	January 20, 2015	Haleakala	Pan-STARRS 1	·	1.6 km	MPC · JPL
891734	2015 BB_{405}	—	January 20, 2015	Haleakala	Pan-STARRS 1	NYS	670 m	MPC · JPL
891735	2015 BE_{406}	—	January 20, 2015	Haleakala	Pan-STARRS 1	·	580 m	MPC · JPL
891736	2015 BA_{409}	—	January 20, 2015	Haleakala	Pan-STARRS 1	·	1.4 km	MPC · JPL
891737	2015 BE_{410}	—	October 23, 2013	Mount Lemmon	Mount Lemmon Survey	THM	1.5 km	MPC · JPL
891738	2015 BP_{410}	—	January 20, 2015	Haleakala	Pan-STARRS 1	·	1.7 km	MPC · JPL
891739	2015 BU_{410}	—	February 7, 2011	Mount Lemmon	Mount Lemmon Survey	·	690 m	MPC · JPL
891740	2015 BA_{412}	—	January 20, 2015	Haleakala	Pan-STARRS 1	NYS	710 m	MPC · JPL
891741	2015 BR_{417}	—	January 20, 2015	Haleakala	Pan-STARRS 1	·	2.3 km	MPC · JPL
891742	2015 BM_{420}	—	January 20, 2015	Haleakala	Pan-STARRS 1	·	2.1 km	MPC · JPL
891743	2015 BE_{421}	—	January 20, 2015	Haleakala	Pan-STARRS 1	·	790 m	MPC · JPL
891744	2015 BF_{421}	—	January 20, 2015	Haleakala	Pan-STARRS 1	·	1.5 km	MPC · JPL
891745	2015 BT_{422}	—	January 20, 2015	Haleakala	Pan-STARRS 1	·	2.0 km	MPC · JPL
891746	2015 BM_{426}	—	October 25, 2013	Kitt Peak	Spacewatch	·	1.7 km	MPC · JPL
891747	2015 BF_{427}	—	January 20, 2015	Haleakala	Pan-STARRS 1	·	1.4 km	MPC · JPL
891748	2015 BH_{427}	—	December 13, 2010	Mount Lemmon	Mount Lemmon Survey	NYS	600 m	MPC · JPL
891749	2015 BR_{430}	—	March 13, 2010	Mount Lemmon	Mount Lemmon Survey	HYG	1.9 km	MPC · JPL
891750	2015 BE_{432}	—	January 20, 2015	Haleakala	Pan-STARRS 1	·	1.8 km	MPC · JPL
891751	2015 BF_{439}	—	January 20, 2015	Haleakala	Pan-STARRS 1	·	960 m	MPC · JPL
891752	2015 BV_{439}	—	January 20, 2015	Haleakala	Pan-STARRS 1	·	1.6 km	MPC · JPL
891753	2015 BT_{440}	—	January 20, 2015	Haleakala	Pan-STARRS 1	·	2.0 km	MPC · JPL
891754	2015 BP_{442}	—	January 20, 2015	Haleakala	Pan-STARRS 1	·	650 m	MPC · JPL
891755	2015 BP_{443}	—	January 17, 2009	Mount Lemmon	Mount Lemmon Survey	·	2.1 km	MPC · JPL
891756	2015 BR_{443}	—	January 20, 2015	Haleakala	Pan-STARRS 1	·	1.9 km	MPC · JPL
891757	2015 BA_{444}	—	January 20, 2015	Haleakala	Pan-STARRS 1	·	2.0 km	MPC · JPL
891758	2015 BZ_{446}	—	January 20, 2015	Haleakala	Pan-STARRS 1	·	1.9 km	MPC · JPL
891759	2015 BJ_{450}	—	January 20, 2015	Haleakala	Pan-STARRS 1	ERI	970 m	MPC · JPL
891760	2015 BF_{453}	—	January 20, 2015	Haleakala	Pan-STARRS 1	PHO	640 m	MPC · JPL
891761	2015 BA_{454}	—	January 20, 2015	Kitt Peak	Spacewatch	·	2.3 km	MPC · JPL
891762	2015 BE_{460}	—	January 30, 2011	Mount Lemmon	Mount Lemmon Survey	V	410 m	MPC · JPL
891763	2015 BO_{460}	—	August 12, 2013	Kitt Peak	Spacewatch	·	850 m	MPC · JPL
891764	2015 BR_{460}	—	January 20, 2015	Haleakala	Pan-STARRS 1	·	710 m	MPC · JPL
891765	2015 BX_{464}	—	November 28, 2011	Mount Lemmon	Mount Lemmon Survey	H	420 m	MPC · JPL
891766	2015 BP_{466}	—	January 20, 2015	Haleakala	Pan-STARRS 1	·	2.1 km	MPC · JPL
891767	2015 BR_{467}	—	January 20, 2015	Haleakala	Pan-STARRS 1	·	2.3 km	MPC · JPL
891768	2015 BE_{470}	—	June 8, 2012	Mount Lemmon	Mount Lemmon Survey	·	600 m	MPC · JPL
891769	2015 BN_{484}	—	October 23, 2013	Mount Lemmon	Mount Lemmon Survey	THM	1.6 km	MPC · JPL
891770	2015 BQ_{486}	—	March 15, 2010	Mount Lemmon	Mount Lemmon Survey	·	1.4 km	MPC · JPL
891771	2015 BZ_{492}	—	January 20, 2015	Haleakala	Pan-STARRS 1	NYS	680 m	MPC · JPL
891772	2015 BK_{494}	—	January 20, 2015	Haleakala	Pan-STARRS 1	·	2.0 km	MPC · JPL
891773	2015 BA_{497}	—	January 20, 2015	Haleakala	Pan-STARRS 1	VER	1.7 km	MPC · JPL
891774	2015 BF_{498}	—	January 20, 2015	Haleakala	Pan-STARRS 1	·	1.4 km	MPC · JPL
891775	2015 BM_{500}	—	January 20, 2015	Haleakala	Pan-STARRS 1	·	640 m	MPC · JPL
891776	2015 BB_{501}	—	January 20, 2015	Haleakala	Pan-STARRS 1	·	930 m	MPC · JPL
891777	2015 BV_{506}	—	March 8, 2008	Mount Lemmon	Mount Lemmon Survey	MAS	410 m	MPC · JPL
891778	2015 BO_{509}	—	January 20, 2015	Haleakala	Pan-STARRS 1	APO	480 m	MPC · JPL
891779	2015 BQ_{510}	—	January 23, 2015	Haleakala	Pan-STARRS 1	APO	390 m	MPC · JPL
891780	2015 BS_{511}	—	December 1, 2014	Haleakala	Pan-STARRS 1	H	350 m	MPC · JPL
891781	2015 BT_{521}	—	January 23, 2015	Haleakala	Pan-STARRS 1	H	340 m	MPC · JPL
891782	2015 BL_{527}	—	January 29, 2015	Haleakala	Pan-STARRS 1	H	300 m	MPC · JPL
891783	2015 BJ_{528}	—	January 21, 2015	Haleakala	Pan-STARRS 1	·	810 m	MPC · JPL
891784	2015 BW_{528}	—	January 16, 2015	Kitt Peak	Spacewatch	·	2.2 km	MPC · JPL
891785	2015 BC_{529}	—	January 16, 2015	Haleakala	Pan-STARRS 1	·	1.4 km	MPC · JPL
891786	2015 BJ_{529}	—	January 18, 2015	Mount Lemmon	Mount Lemmon Survey	·	1.6 km	MPC · JPL
891787	2015 BL_{530}	—	January 20, 2015	Haleakala	Pan-STARRS 1	·	2.3 km	MPC · JPL
891788	2015 BY_{530}	—	January 21, 2015	Haleakala	Pan-STARRS 1	NYS	740 m	MPC · JPL
891789	2015 BA_{531}	—	January 21, 2015	Haleakala	Pan-STARRS 1	MAR	830 m	MPC · JPL
891790	2015 BB_{533}	—	January 28, 2015	Haleakala	Pan-STARRS 1	THB	1.8 km	MPC · JPL
891791	2015 BJ_{533}	—	January 28, 2015	Haleakala	Pan-STARRS 1	LIX	2.4 km	MPC · JPL
891792	2015 BM_{533}	—	January 29, 2015	Haleakala	Pan-STARRS 1	·	750 m	MPC · JPL
891793	2015 BN_{533}	—	January 29, 2015	Haleakala	Pan-STARRS 1	·	810 m	MPC · JPL
891794	2015 BV_{533}	—	January 21, 2015	Haleakala	Pan-STARRS 1	·	2.3 km	MPC · JPL
891795	2015 BN_{545}	—	January 20, 2009	Mount Lemmon	Mount Lemmon Survey	·	2.0 km	MPC · JPL
891796	2015 BA_{547}	—	January 23, 2015	Haleakala	Pan-STARRS 1	HYG	1.9 km	MPC · JPL
891797	2015 BB_{557}	—	September 25, 2006	Mount Lemmon	Mount Lemmon Survey	NYS	730 m	MPC · JPL
891798	2015 BH_{561}	—	January 19, 2015	Mount Lemmon	Mount Lemmon Survey	·	2.5 km	MPC · JPL
891799	2015 BK_{561}	—	December 11, 2014	Mount Lemmon	Mount Lemmon Survey	EOS	1.3 km	MPC · JPL
891800	2015 BK_{563}	—	January 20, 2015	Haleakala	Pan-STARRS 1	·	1.6 km	MPC · JPL

== 891801–891900 ==
back to top

Designation			Discovery			Properties		Ref
Permanent	Provisional	Named after	Date	Site	Discoverer(s)	Category	Diam.	Ref
891801	2015 BQ_{563}	—	January 20, 2015	Haleakala	Pan-STARRS 1	·	920 m	MPC · JPL
891802	2015 BX_{568}	—	January 23, 2015	Haleakala	Pan-STARRS 1	·	2.3 km	MPC · JPL
891803	2015 BY_{568}	—	January 24, 2015	Haleakala	Pan-STARRS 1	·	1.1 km	MPC · JPL
891804	2015 BC_{569}	—	January 21, 2015	Haleakala	Pan-STARRS 1	·	800 m	MPC · JPL
891805	2015 BK_{569}	—	January 22, 2015	Haleakala	Pan-STARRS 1	·	910 m	MPC · JPL
891806	2015 BW_{569}	—	January 20, 2015	Haleakala	Pan-STARRS 1	·	920 m	MPC · JPL
891807	2015 BX_{569}	—	January 21, 2015	Haleakala	Pan-STARRS 1	·	810 m	MPC · JPL
891808	2015 BE_{570}	—	January 20, 2015	Haleakala	Pan-STARRS 1	·	760 m	MPC · JPL
891809	2015 BL_{570}	—	January 28, 2015	Haleakala	Pan-STARRS 1	H	360 m	MPC · JPL
891810	2015 BH_{571}	—	January 26, 2015	Haleakala	Pan-STARRS 1	HNS	830 m	MPC · JPL
891811	2015 BQ_{571}	—	January 27, 2015	Haleakala	Pan-STARRS 1	·	2.6 km	MPC · JPL
891812	2015 BU_{571}	—	January 21, 2015	Haleakala	Pan-STARRS 1	·	950 m	MPC · JPL
891813	2015 BA_{572}	—	January 16, 2015	Haleakala	Pan-STARRS 1	·	730 m	MPC · JPL
891814	2015 BQ_{572}	—	January 16, 2015	Haleakala	Pan-STARRS 1	·	570 m	MPC · JPL
891815	2015 BB_{573}	—	January 27, 2015	Haleakala	Pan-STARRS 1	·	2.6 km	MPC · JPL
891816	2015 BT_{573}	—	January 27, 2015	Haleakala	Pan-STARRS 1	·	1.7 km	MPC · JPL
891817	2015 BP_{574}	—	January 23, 2015	Haleakala	Pan-STARRS 1	·	2.5 km	MPC · JPL
891818	2015 BH_{575}	—	January 19, 2015	Mount Lemmon	Mount Lemmon Survey	·	1.0 km	MPC · JPL
891819	2015 BE_{577}	—	January 30, 2015	Haleakala	Pan-STARRS 1	PHO	660 m	MPC · JPL
891820	2015 BT_{577}	—	January 24, 2015	Haleakala	Pan-STARRS 1	H	360 m	MPC · JPL
891821	2015 BD_{578}	—	July 15, 2013	Haleakala	Pan-STARRS 1	·	1.6 km	MPC · JPL
891822	2015 BU_{578}	—	January 23, 2015	Haleakala	Pan-STARRS 1	·	1.6 km	MPC · JPL
891823	2015 BL_{580}	—	December 24, 2017	Mount Lemmon	Mount Lemmon Survey	H	420 m	MPC · JPL
891824	2015 BA_{584}	—	January 27, 2015	Haleakala	Pan-STARRS 1	·	700 m	MPC · JPL
891825	2015 BA_{586}	—	January 19, 2015	Haleakala	Pan-STARRS 1	·	1.3 km	MPC · JPL
891826	2015 BD_{586}	—	January 20, 2015	Kitt Peak	Spacewatch	·	1.6 km	MPC · JPL
891827	2015 BJ_{586}	—	January 21, 2015	Haleakala	Pan-STARRS 1	·	1.7 km	MPC · JPL
891828	2015 BL_{587}	—	January 20, 2015	Haleakala	Pan-STARRS 1	THB	1.7 km	MPC · JPL
891829	2015 BH_{588}	—	January 17, 2015	Haleakala	Pan-STARRS 1	THB	1.9 km	MPC · JPL
891830	2015 BO_{588}	—	January 27, 2015	Haleakala	Pan-STARRS 1	·	1.8 km	MPC · JPL
891831	2015 BP_{588}	—	January 21, 2015	Haleakala	Pan-STARRS 1	·	1.6 km	MPC · JPL
891832	2015 BR_{588}	—	January 21, 2015	Haleakala	Pan-STARRS 1	·	1.2 km	MPC · JPL
891833	2015 BC_{589}	—	January 17, 2015	Mount Lemmon	Mount Lemmon Survey	·	860 m	MPC · JPL
891834	2015 BJ_{589}	—	January 28, 2015	Haleakala	Pan-STARRS 1	·	2.0 km	MPC · JPL
891835	2015 BL_{589}	—	January 16, 2015	Haleakala	Pan-STARRS 1	·	1.8 km	MPC · JPL
891836	2015 BX_{589}	—	January 17, 2015	Haleakala	Pan-STARRS 1	·	2.1 km	MPC · JPL
891837	2015 BN_{592}	—	January 27, 2015	Haleakala	Pan-STARRS 1	·	1.8 km	MPC · JPL
891838	2015 BV_{592}	—	January 16, 2015	Haleakala	Pan-STARRS 1	·	2.0 km	MPC · JPL
891839	2015 BD_{593}	—	January 22, 2015	Haleakala	Pan-STARRS 1	TIR	1.7 km	MPC · JPL
891840	2015 BH_{593}	—	January 21, 2015	Haleakala	Pan-STARRS 1	·	2.2 km	MPC · JPL
891841	2015 BM_{595}	—	January 23, 2015	Haleakala	Pan-STARRS 1	·	860 m	MPC · JPL
891842	2015 BN_{597}	—	January 23, 2015	Haleakala	Pan-STARRS 1	·	2.1 km	MPC · JPL
891843	2015 BY_{597}	—	January 25, 2015	Haleakala	Pan-STARRS 1	V	430 m	MPC · JPL
891844	2015 BH_{599}	—	January 20, 2015	Haleakala	Pan-STARRS 1	TIR	1.6 km	MPC · JPL
891845	2015 BZ_{599}	—	January 19, 2015	Mount Lemmon	Mount Lemmon Survey	·	2.0 km	MPC · JPL
891846	2015 BH_{600}	—	January 22, 2015	Haleakala	Pan-STARRS 1	·	2.3 km	MPC · JPL
891847	2015 BP_{602}	—	January 21, 2015	Haleakala	Pan-STARRS 1	·	1.0 km	MPC · JPL
891848	2015 BY_{603}	—	January 21, 2015	Haleakala	Pan-STARRS 1	VER	1.7 km	MPC · JPL
891849	2015 BX_{604}	—	January 21, 2015	Haleakala	Pan-STARRS 1	·	1.1 km	MPC · JPL
891850	2015 BV_{605}	—	January 20, 2015	Haleakala	Pan-STARRS 1	·	2.2 km	MPC · JPL
891851	2015 BU_{608}	—	January 18, 2015	Haleakala	Pan-STARRS 1	·	720 m	MPC · JPL
891852	2015 BW_{608}	—	January 20, 2015	Haleakala	Pan-STARRS 1	·	2.1 km	MPC · JPL
891853	2015 BE_{610}	—	January 22, 2015	Haleakala	Pan-STARRS 1	·	1.8 km	MPC · JPL
891854	2015 BT_{610}	—	January 20, 2015	Haleakala	Pan-STARRS 1	VER	1.7 km	MPC · JPL
891855	2015 BZ_{610}	—	January 19, 2015	Haleakala	Pan-STARRS 1	H	360 m	MPC · JPL
891856	2015 BR_{612}	—	January 17, 2015	Haleakala	Pan-STARRS 1	·	810 m	MPC · JPL
891857	2015 BP_{615}	—	January 29, 2015	Haleakala	Pan-STARRS 1	·	1.6 km	MPC · JPL
891858	2015 BG_{616}	—	January 17, 2015	Mount Lemmon	Mount Lemmon Survey	·	2.0 km	MPC · JPL
891859	2015 BM_{616}	—	January 20, 2015	Mount Lemmon	Mount Lemmon Survey	·	2.0 km	MPC · JPL
891860	2015 BB_{617}	—	January 26, 2015	Haleakala	Pan-STARRS 1	EOS	1.1 km	MPC · JPL
891861	2015 BF_{617}	—	January 17, 2015	Haleakala	Pan-STARRS 1	EOS	1.2 km	MPC · JPL
891862	2015 CQ_{2}	—	February 7, 2015	Mount Lemmon	Mount Lemmon Survey	·	810 m	MPC · JPL
891863	2015 CL_{9}	—	January 20, 2015	Haleakala	Pan-STARRS 1	THM	1.6 km	MPC · JPL
891864	2015 CO_{14}	—	December 4, 2010	Mount Lemmon	Mount Lemmon Survey	NYS	710 m	MPC · JPL
891865	2015 CB_{19}	—	February 9, 2015	Mount Lemmon	Mount Lemmon Survey	·	1.7 km	MPC · JPL
891866	2015 CT_{21}	—	January 30, 2004	Kitt Peak	Spacewatch	MAS	460 m	MPC · JPL
891867	2015 CC_{22}	—	February 10, 2015	Mount Lemmon	Mount Lemmon Survey	URS	2.2 km	MPC · JPL
891868	2015 CO_{22}	—	January 20, 2015	Haleakala	Pan-STARRS 1	·	1.8 km	MPC · JPL
891869	2015 CA_{24}	—	January 27, 2015	Haleakala	Pan-STARRS 1	H	380 m	MPC · JPL
891870	2015 CL_{26}	—	January 22, 2015	Haleakala	Pan-STARRS 1	THM	1.7 km	MPC · JPL
891871	2015 CX_{26}	—	January 20, 2015	Haleakala	Pan-STARRS 1	V	490 m	MPC · JPL
891872	2015 CG_{27}	—	January 20, 2015	Haleakala	Pan-STARRS 1	·	1.5 km	MPC · JPL
891873	2015 CM_{27}	—	January 20, 2015	Haleakala	Pan-STARRS 1	·	740 m	MPC · JPL
891874	2015 CL_{40}	—	January 22, 2015	Haleakala	Pan-STARRS 1	EOS	1.3 km	MPC · JPL
891875	2015 CQ_{42}	—	January 21, 2015	Haleakala	Pan-STARRS 1	·	750 m	MPC · JPL
891876	2015 CT_{44}	—	May 13, 2010	Mount Lemmon	Mount Lemmon Survey	·	2.0 km	MPC · JPL
891877	2015 CO_{59}	—	January 20, 2015	Haleakala	Pan-STARRS 1	H	340 m	MPC · JPL
891878	2015 CT_{59}	—	February 15, 2015	Piszkéstető	K. Sárneczky	·	1.2 km	MPC · JPL
891879	2015 CU_{64}	—	January 17, 2015	Haleakala	Pan-STARRS 1	EOS	1.4 km	MPC · JPL
891880	2015 CC_{66}	—	January 17, 2015	Haleakala	Pan-STARRS 1	·	2.7 km	MPC · JPL
891881	2015 CQ_{68}	—	February 10, 2015	Mount Lemmon	Mount Lemmon Survey	·	770 m	MPC · JPL
891882	2015 CY_{69}	—	January 20, 2015	Haleakala	Pan-STARRS 1	MAS	460 m	MPC · JPL
891883	2015 CW_{71}	—	February 15, 2015	Haleakala	Pan-STARRS 1	·	790 m	MPC · JPL
891884	2015 CA_{72}	—	February 12, 2015	Haleakala	Pan-STARRS 1	HNS	740 m	MPC · JPL
891885	2015 CV_{72}	—	February 10, 2015	Mount Lemmon	Mount Lemmon Survey	·	2.0 km	MPC · JPL
891886	2015 CN_{73}	—	February 10, 2015	Kitt Peak	Spacewatch	·	1.0 km	MPC · JPL
891887	2015 CU_{74}	—	February 15, 2015	Haleakala	Pan-STARRS 1	NYS	790 m	MPC · JPL
891888	2015 CP_{75}	—	February 7, 2015	Mount Lemmon	Mount Lemmon Survey	·	720 m	MPC · JPL
891889	2015 CD_{76}	—	January 16, 2015	Haleakala	Pan-STARRS 1	·	1.4 km	MPC · JPL
891890	2015 CH_{76}	—	February 13, 2015	Mount Lemmon	Mount Lemmon Survey	·	2.2 km	MPC · JPL
891891	2015 CT_{76}	—	January 25, 2015	Haleakala	Pan-STARRS 1	EUP	1.9 km	MPC · JPL
891892	2015 CZ_{76}	—	January 16, 2015	Haleakala	Pan-STARRS 1	EOS	1.4 km	MPC · JPL
891893	2015 CA_{77}	—	February 13, 2015	Mount Lemmon	Mount Lemmon Survey	·	1.9 km	MPC · JPL
891894	2015 CC_{77}	—	January 17, 2015	Mount Lemmon	Mount Lemmon Survey	·	2.2 km	MPC · JPL
891895	2015 CR_{77}	—	January 20, 2015	Haleakala	Pan-STARRS 1	EOS	1.3 km	MPC · JPL
891896	2015 CZ_{77}	—	February 11, 2015	Kitt Peak	Spacewatch	NYS	590 m	MPC · JPL
891897	2015 CC_{78}	—	January 22, 2015	Haleakala	Pan-STARRS 1	MAS	490 m	MPC · JPL
891898	2015 CK_{78}	—	January 22, 2015	Haleakala	Pan-STARRS 1	·	820 m	MPC · JPL
891899	2015 CP_{78}	—	January 25, 2015	Haleakala	Pan-STARRS 1	ELF	2.5 km	MPC · JPL
891900	2015 CX_{78}	—	January 19, 2015	Mount Lemmon	Mount Lemmon Survey	·	830 m	MPC · JPL

== 891901–892000 ==
back to top

Designation			Discovery			Properties		Ref
Permanent	Provisional	Named after	Date	Site	Discoverer(s)	Category	Diam.	Ref
891901	2015 CX_{80}	—	February 13, 2015	Haleakala	Pan-STARRS 1	·	1.6 km	MPC · JPL
891902	2015 CO_{89}	—	February 9, 2015	Mount Lemmon	Mount Lemmon Survey	PHO	540 m	MPC · JPL
891903	2015 DF_{2}	—	January 17, 2015	Mount Lemmon	Mount Lemmon Survey	·	660 m	MPC · JPL
891904	2015 DO_{4}	—	January 14, 2015	Haleakala	Pan-STARRS 1	·	1.7 km	MPC · JPL
891905	2015 DW_{4}	—	January 14, 2015	Haleakala	Pan-STARRS 1	·	850 m	MPC · JPL
891906	2015 DD_{5}	—	January 16, 2015	Haleakala	Pan-STARRS 1	·	1.4 km	MPC · JPL
891907	2015 DD_{6}	—	January 19, 2015	Mount Lemmon	Mount Lemmon Survey	·	1.5 km	MPC · JPL
891908	2015 DF_{6}	—	February 2, 2008	Kitt Peak	Spacewatch	·	600 m	MPC · JPL
891909	2015 DN_{6}	—	January 16, 2015	Haleakala	Pan-STARRS 1	·	2.0 km	MPC · JPL
891910	2015 DQ_{8}	—	December 21, 2014	Mount Lemmon	Mount Lemmon Survey	·	2.2 km	MPC · JPL
891911	2015 DS_{9}	—	March 18, 2010	Kitt Peak	Spacewatch	·	1.7 km	MPC · JPL
891912	2015 DQ_{10}	—	January 22, 2015	Haleakala	Pan-STARRS 1	H	350 m	MPC · JPL
891913	2015 DR_{10}	—	January 16, 2015	Haleakala	Pan-STARRS 1	·	1.9 km	MPC · JPL
891914	2015 DX_{11}	—	January 17, 2015	Haleakala	Pan-STARRS 1	THM	1.7 km	MPC · JPL
891915	2015 DB_{12}	—	December 24, 2005	Kitt Peak	Spacewatch	·	1.3 km	MPC · JPL
891916	2015 DK_{14}	—	January 18, 2015	Haleakala	Pan-STARRS 1	THM	1.5 km	MPC · JPL
891917	2015 DH_{15}	—	January 19, 2015	Mount Lemmon	Mount Lemmon Survey	·	620 m	MPC · JPL
891918	2015 DN_{15}	—	February 16, 2015	Haleakala	Pan-STARRS 1	T_{j} (2.98) · EUP	2.5 km	MPC · JPL
891919	2015 DT_{17}	—	January 27, 2015	Haleakala	Pan-STARRS 1	·	660 m	MPC · JPL
891920	2015 DV_{17}	—	February 16, 2015	Haleakala	Pan-STARRS 1	PHO	630 m	MPC · JPL
891921	2015 DX_{21}	—	January 29, 2015	Haleakala	Pan-STARRS 1	·	600 m	MPC · JPL
891922	2015 DR_{23}	—	February 16, 2015	Haleakala	Pan-STARRS 1	THM	1.5 km	MPC · JPL
891923	2015 DY_{24}	—	January 3, 2011	Mount Lemmon	Mount Lemmon Survey	·	780 m	MPC · JPL
891924	2015 DO_{25}	—	January 4, 2011	Mount Lemmon	Mount Lemmon Survey	NYS	770 m	MPC · JPL
891925	2015 DP_{33}	—	February 16, 2015	Haleakala	Pan-STARRS 1	THM	1.8 km	MPC · JPL
891926	2015 DX_{34}	—	February 16, 2015	Haleakala	Pan-STARRS 1	MAS	470 m	MPC · JPL
891927	2015 DR_{35}	—	February 16, 2015	Haleakala	Pan-STARRS 1	HYG	2.0 km	MPC · JPL
891928	2015 DP_{37}	—	January 27, 2015	Haleakala	Pan-STARRS 1	·	850 m	MPC · JPL
891929	2015 DT_{37}	—	January 21, 2015	Haleakala	Pan-STARRS 1	·	1.6 km	MPC · JPL
891930	2015 DZ_{38}	—	February 16, 2015	Haleakala	Pan-STARRS 1	·	1.9 km	MPC · JPL
891931	2015 DY_{40}	—	January 27, 2015	Haleakala	Pan-STARRS 1	EUP	2.0 km	MPC · JPL
891932	2015 DM_{41}	—	January 29, 2015	Haleakala	Pan-STARRS 1	·	2.3 km	MPC · JPL
891933	2015 DS_{45}	—	January 27, 2015	Haleakala	Pan-STARRS 1	·	850 m	MPC · JPL
891934	2015 DH_{51}	—	February 8, 2015	Kitt Peak	Spacewatch	·	920 m	MPC · JPL
891935	2015 DU_{51}	—	February 16, 2015	Haleakala	Pan-STARRS 1	·	2.3 km	MPC · JPL
891936	2015 DD_{52}	—	July 16, 2013	Haleakala	Pan-STARRS 1	H	340 m	MPC · JPL
891937	2015 DQ_{56}	—	November 11, 2013	Mount Lemmon	Mount Lemmon Survey	VER	2.0 km	MPC · JPL
891938	2015 DC_{59}	—	January 20, 2015	Haleakala	Pan-STARRS 1	·	1.8 km	MPC · JPL
891939	2015 DR_{62}	—	January 20, 2015	Kitt Peak	Spacewatch	·	950 m	MPC · JPL
891940	2015 DZ_{62}	—	January 16, 2015	Haleakala	Pan-STARRS 1	·	650 m	MPC · JPL
891941	2015 DO_{65}	—	January 20, 2015	Haleakala	Pan-STARRS 1	·	1.6 km	MPC · JPL
891942	2015 DR_{66}	—	January 22, 2015	Haleakala	Pan-STARRS 1	·	1.4 km	MPC · JPL
891943	2015 DV_{69}	—	January 22, 2015	Haleakala	Pan-STARRS 1	·	2.2 km	MPC · JPL
891944	2015 DK_{70}	—	January 22, 2015	Haleakala	Pan-STARRS 1	THB	1.6 km	MPC · JPL
891945	2015 DE_{76}	—	December 8, 2010	Kitt Peak	Spacewatch	MAS	480 m	MPC · JPL
891946	2015 DC_{77}	—	February 16, 2015	Haleakala	Pan-STARRS 1	·	1.1 km	MPC · JPL
891947	2015 DA_{88}	—	January 22, 2015	Haleakala	Pan-STARRS 1	·	2.2 km	MPC · JPL
891948	2015 DK_{88}	—	February 9, 2015	Mount Lemmon	Mount Lemmon Survey	·	1.9 km	MPC · JPL
891949	2015 DX_{88}	—	January 22, 2015	Haleakala	Pan-STARRS 1	·	1.0 km	MPC · JPL
891950	2015 DZ_{88}	—	February 16, 2015	Haleakala	Pan-STARRS 1	TIR	1.5 km	MPC · JPL
891951	2015 DL_{90}	—	April 5, 2008	Kitt Peak	Spacewatch	MAS	480 m	MPC · JPL
891952	2015 DS_{91}	—	March 29, 2008	Kitt Peak	Spacewatch	·	640 m	MPC · JPL
891953	2015 DY_{91}	—	February 16, 2015	Haleakala	Pan-STARRS 1	·	830 m	MPC · JPL
891954	2015 DB_{92}	—	April 14, 2008	Kitt Peak	Spacewatch	NYS	870 m	MPC · JPL
891955	2015 DO_{93}	—	February 16, 2015	Haleakala	Pan-STARRS 1	·	820 m	MPC · JPL
891956	2015 DV_{93}	—	February 16, 2015	Haleakala	Pan-STARRS 1	·	2.0 km	MPC · JPL
891957	2015 DH_{95}	—	April 27, 2008	Mount Lemmon	Mount Lemmon Survey	PHO	560 m	MPC · JPL
891958	2015 DP_{102}	—	February 12, 2015	Piszkéstető	K. Sárneczky	·	1.9 km	MPC · JPL
891959	2015 DN_{104}	—	April 15, 2010	Mount Lemmon	Mount Lemmon Survey	LIX	2.8 km	MPC · JPL
891960	2015 DB_{105}	—	January 20, 2015	Mount Lemmon	Mount Lemmon Survey	·	2.0 km	MPC · JPL
891961	2015 DY_{108}	—	January 15, 2015	Haleakala	Pan-STARRS 1	·	1.9 km	MPC · JPL
891962	2015 DL_{111}	—	January 15, 2015	Haleakala	Pan-STARRS 1	TIR	1.8 km	MPC · JPL
891963	2015 DL_{112}	—	January 27, 2015	Haleakala	Pan-STARRS 1	LIX	2.1 km	MPC · JPL
891964	2015 DC_{120}	—	January 21, 2015	Haleakala	Pan-STARRS 1	·	940 m	MPC · JPL
891965	2015 DG_{120}	—	January 10, 2011	Mount Lemmon	Mount Lemmon Survey	·	740 m	MPC · JPL
891966	2015 DT_{121}	—	January 28, 2015	Haleakala	Pan-STARRS 1	LIX	2.0 km	MPC · JPL
891967	2015 DZ_{129}	—	February 17, 2015	Haleakala	Pan-STARRS 1	·	2.1 km	MPC · JPL
891968	2015 DX_{130}	—	February 1, 2009	Kitt Peak	Spacewatch	·	1.9 km	MPC · JPL
891969	2015 DW_{135}	—	February 17, 2015	Haleakala	Pan-STARRS 1	·	1.4 km	MPC · JPL
891970	2015 DG_{136}	—	February 17, 2015	Haleakala	Pan-STARRS 1	·	1.8 km	MPC · JPL
891971	2015 DP_{136}	—	February 17, 2015	Haleakala	Pan-STARRS 1	·	2.0 km	MPC · JPL
891972	2015 DH_{139}	—	January 22, 2015	Haleakala	Pan-STARRS 1	·	1.7 km	MPC · JPL
891973	2015 DQ_{139}	—	January 18, 2015	Haleakala	Pan-STARRS 1	·	1.5 km	MPC · JPL
891974	2015 DF_{141}	—	January 18, 2015	Mount Lemmon	Mount Lemmon Survey	·	1.5 km	MPC · JPL
891975	2015 DA_{143}	—	December 26, 2014	Haleakala	Pan-STARRS 1	H	420 m	MPC · JPL
891976	2015 DS_{147}	—	December 22, 2003	Kitt Peak	Spacewatch	·	1.7 km	MPC · JPL
891977	2015 DE_{149}	—	January 17, 2015	Haleakala	Pan-STARRS 1	ARM	2.8 km	MPC · JPL
891978	2015 DL_{150}	—	June 11, 2005	Kitt Peak	Spacewatch	·	1.6 km	MPC · JPL
891979	2015 DZ_{152}	—	January 14, 2011	Kitt Peak	Spacewatch	·	840 m	MPC · JPL
891980	2015 DV_{153}	—	December 30, 2014	Mount Lemmon	Mount Lemmon Survey	·	1.9 km	MPC · JPL
891981	2015 DB_{154}	—	February 18, 2015	Haleakala	Pan-STARRS 1	·	2.2 km	MPC · JPL
891982	2015 DF_{156}	—	January 23, 2015	Haleakala	Pan-STARRS 1	LIX	2.0 km	MPC · JPL
891983	2015 DX_{160}	—	November 11, 2013	Kitt Peak	Spacewatch	EOS	1.4 km	MPC · JPL
891984	2015 DQ_{162}	—	February 10, 2011	Mount Lemmon	Mount Lemmon Survey	·	670 m	MPC · JPL
891985	2015 DO_{163}	—	January 21, 2015	Haleakala	Pan-STARRS 1	·	1.5 km	MPC · JPL
891986	2015 DV_{171}	—	November 25, 2014	Haleakala	Pan-STARRS 1	THB	1.9 km	MPC · JPL
891987	2015 DZ_{171}	—	October 9, 2013	Mount Lemmon	Mount Lemmon Survey	·	1.4 km	MPC · JPL
891988	2015 DK_{172}	—	January 25, 2015	Haleakala	Pan-STARRS 1	·	1.8 km	MPC · JPL
891989	2015 DZ_{173}	—	February 19, 2015	Haleakala	Pan-STARRS 1	PHO	560 m	MPC · JPL
891990	2015 DC_{177}	—	December 29, 2014	Haleakala	Pan-STARRS 1	·	1.9 km	MPC · JPL
891991	2015 DM_{177}	—	December 29, 2014	Haleakala	Pan-STARRS 1	H	430 m	MPC · JPL
891992	2015 DB_{178}	—	February 16, 2015	Haleakala	Pan-STARRS 1	·	2.3 km	MPC · JPL
891993	2015 DD_{180}	—	October 2, 2006	Kitt Peak	Spacewatch	·	830 m	MPC · JPL
891994	2015 DJ_{187}	—	November 9, 2013	Mount Lemmon	Mount Lemmon Survey	LIX	2.4 km	MPC · JPL
891995	2015 DO_{187}	—	December 29, 2008	Kitt Peak	Spacewatch	·	1.9 km	MPC · JPL
891996	2015 DE_{188}	—	January 27, 2015	Haleakala	Pan-STARRS 1	·	940 m	MPC · JPL
891997	2015 DJ_{189}	—	February 20, 2015	Haleakala	Pan-STARRS 1	·	1.7 km	MPC · JPL
891998	2015 DQ_{190}	—	April 9, 2010	Kitt Peak	Spacewatch	·	2.0 km	MPC · JPL
891999	2015 DZ_{190}	—	January 15, 2015	Haleakala	Pan-STARRS 1	·	2.3 km	MPC · JPL
892000	2015 DR_{192}	—	February 11, 2004	Kitt Peak	Spacewatch	PHO	640 m	MPC · JPL

back to top

== See also ==
- Meanings of minor-planet names: 891001–892000
