= List of minor planets: 865001–866000 =

The following is a partial list of minor planets, running from minor-planet number 865001 through 866000, inclusive. The primary data for this and other partial lists is based on JPL's "Small-Body Orbital Elements" and data available from the Minor Planet Center. Critical list information is also provided by the MPC, unless otherwise specified from Lowell Observatory. A detailed description of the table's columns and additional sources are given on the main page including a complete list of every page in this series, and a statistical break-up on the dynamical classification of minor planets.

Also see the summary list of all named bodies in numerical and alphabetical order, and the corresponding naming citations for the number range of this particular list. New namings may only be added to this list after official publication, as the preannouncement of names is condemned by the Working Group for Small Bodies Nomenclature of the International Astronomical Union.

Near-Earth obj.	MBA (inner)	MBA (outer)	Centaur
Mars-crosser	MBA (middle)	Jupiter trojan	Trans-Neptunian obj.
Unclassified

== 865001–865100 ==
Designation			Discovery			Properties		Ref
Permanent	Provisional	Named after	Date	Site	Discoverer(s)	Category	Diam.	Ref
865001	2015 DB_{161}	—	February 18, 2015	Mount Lemmon	Mount Lemmon Survey	·	830 m	MPC · JPL
865002	2015 DL_{166}	—	January 19, 2015	Haleakala	Pan-STARRS 1	·	730 m	MPC · JPL
865003	2015 DM_{166}	—	February 18, 2015	Haleakala	Pan-STARRS 1	EUN	890 m	MPC · JPL
865004	2015 DY_{166}	—	February 18, 2015	Kitt Peak	Spacewatch	·	2.3 km	MPC · JPL
865005	2015 DR_{169}	—	January 28, 2015	Haleakala	Pan-STARRS 1	·	900 m	MPC · JPL
865006	2015 DC_{173}	—	November 4, 2004	Kitt Peak	Spacewatch	WAT	1.1 km	MPC · JPL
865007	2015 DJ_{173}	—	November 8, 2008	Kitt Peak	Spacewatch	·	1.8 km	MPC · JPL
865008	2015 DB_{174}	—	February 19, 2015	Haleakala	Pan-STARRS 1	·	1.0 km	MPC · JPL
865009	2015 DH_{176}	—	August 23, 2004	Kitt Peak	Spacewatch	·	290 m	MPC · JPL
865010	2015 DP_{178}	—	January 16, 2015	Haleakala	Pan-STARRS 1	·	1.0 km	MPC · JPL
865011	2015 DO_{179}	—	January 24, 2015	Haleakala	Pan-STARRS 1	PHO	670 m	MPC · JPL
865012	2015 DY_{190}	—	February 20, 2015	Haleakala	Pan-STARRS 1	ELF	2.3 km	MPC · JPL
865013	2015 DR_{193}	—	December 26, 2014	Haleakala	Pan-STARRS 1	·	1.0 km	MPC · JPL
865014	2015 DX_{193}	—	November 21, 2014	Haleakala	Pan-STARRS 1	JUN	670 m	MPC · JPL
865015	2015 DV_{195}	—	December 26, 2014	Haleakala	Pan-STARRS 1	·	2.3 km	MPC · JPL
865016	2015 DK_{196}	—	January 27, 2015	Haleakala	Pan-STARRS 1	TIR	2.0 km	MPC · JPL
865017	2015 DB_{201}	—	February 16, 2015	Haleakala	Pan-STARRS 1	·	2.0 km	MPC · JPL
865018	2015 DR_{203}	—	February 23, 2015	Haleakala	Pan-STARRS 1	·	590 m	MPC · JPL
865019	2015 DP_{204}	—	February 25, 2006	Catalina	CSS	·	1.5 km	MPC · JPL
865020	2015 DZ_{206}	—	April 15, 2010	Mount Lemmon	Mount Lemmon Survey	H	410 m	MPC · JPL
865021	2015 DE_{216}	—	February 27, 2015	Mount Lemmon	Mount Lemmon Survey	H	400 m	MPC · JPL
865022	2015 DB_{217}	—	January 30, 2012	Mount Lemmon	Mount Lemmon Survey	H	470 m	MPC · JPL
865023	2015 DK_{224}	—	December 2, 2010	Mount Lemmon	Mount Lemmon Survey	·	1.1 km	MPC · JPL
865024	2015 DS_{239}	—	February 16, 2015	Haleakala	Pan-STARRS 1	ADE	1.6 km	MPC · JPL
865025	2015 DC_{241}	—	October 2, 2013	Haleakala	Pan-STARRS 1	THB	2.1 km	MPC · JPL
865026	2015 DL_{244}	—	February 23, 2015	Haleakala	Pan-STARRS 1	·	1.0 km	MPC · JPL
865027	2015 DP_{244}	—	January 28, 2015	Haleakala	Pan-STARRS 1	EUN	1.0 km	MPC · JPL
865028	2015 DC_{251}	—	February 24, 2015	Haleakala	Pan-STARRS 1	·	1.3 km	MPC · JPL
865029	2015 DJ_{251}	—	February 23, 2015	Haleakala	Pan-STARRS 1	·	2.8 km	MPC · JPL
865030	2015 DO_{252}	—	February 20, 2015	Haleakala	Pan-STARRS 1	·	1.2 km	MPC · JPL
865031	2015 DX_{252}	—	February 23, 2015	Haleakala	Pan-STARRS 1	·	640 m	MPC · JPL
865032	2015 DW_{253}	—	September 21, 2011	Mount Lemmon	Mount Lemmon Survey	·	2.3 km	MPC · JPL
865033	2015 DE_{254}	—	February 16, 2015	Haleakala	Pan-STARRS 1	·	1.0 km	MPC · JPL
865034	2015 DN_{254}	—	February 27, 2015	Haleakala	Pan-STARRS 1	·	830 m	MPC · JPL
865035	2015 DD_{255}	—	February 23, 2015	Haleakala	Pan-STARRS 1	CLO	1.4 km	MPC · JPL
865036	2015 DD_{258}	—	February 23, 2015	Haleakala	Pan-STARRS 1	·	2.0 km	MPC · JPL
865037	2015 DE_{258}	—	February 23, 2015	Haleakala	Pan-STARRS 1	·	490 m	MPC · JPL
865038	2015 DK_{258}	—	February 16, 2015	Haleakala	Pan-STARRS 1	·	950 m	MPC · JPL
865039	2015 DZ_{258}	—	February 23, 2015	Haleakala	Pan-STARRS 1	·	1.3 km	MPC · JPL
865040	2015 DV_{260}	—	February 20, 2015	Haleakala	Pan-STARRS 1	·	1.1 km	MPC · JPL
865041	2015 DM_{264}	—	February 18, 2015	Haleakala	Pan-STARRS 1	·	1.1 km	MPC · JPL
865042	2015 DG_{266}	—	February 16, 2015	Haleakala	Pan-STARRS 1	EOS	1.2 km	MPC · JPL
865043	2015 DT_{266}	—	February 24, 2015	Haleakala	Pan-STARRS 1	·	2.2 km	MPC · JPL
865044	2015 DV_{267}	—	February 16, 2015	Haleakala	Pan-STARRS 1	·	2.2 km	MPC · JPL
865045	2015 DZ_{270}	—	February 16, 2015	Haleakala	Pan-STARRS 1	·	1.1 km	MPC · JPL
865046	2015 DC_{272}	—	February 16, 2015	Haleakala	Pan-STARRS 1	·	1.1 km	MPC · JPL
865047	2015 DQ_{272}	—	March 19, 2007	Mount Lemmon	Mount Lemmon Survey	·	980 m	MPC · JPL
865048	2015 DR_{272}	—	February 16, 2015	Haleakala	Pan-STARRS 1	·	1.1 km	MPC · JPL
865049	2015 DC_{273}	—	February 20, 2015	Haleakala	Pan-STARRS 1	·	800 m	MPC · JPL
865050	2015 DF_{273}	—	February 16, 2015	Haleakala	Pan-STARRS 1	·	600 m	MPC · JPL
865051	2015 DA_{274}	—	February 16, 2015	Haleakala	Pan-STARRS 1	·	1.2 km	MPC · JPL
865052	2015 DT_{276}	—	February 16, 2015	Haleakala	Pan-STARRS 1	·	1.6 km	MPC · JPL
865053	2015 DW_{278}	—	February 25, 2015	Haleakala	Pan-STARRS 1	·	490 m	MPC · JPL
865054	2015 DF_{279}	—	February 23, 2015	Haleakala	Pan-STARRS 1	·	690 m	MPC · JPL
865055	2015 DB_{282}	—	February 16, 2015	Haleakala	Pan-STARRS 1	·	540 m	MPC · JPL
865056	2015 DH_{282}	—	February 27, 2015	Haleakala	Pan-STARRS 1	·	710 m	MPC · JPL
865057	2015 DV_{282}	—	January 27, 2015	Haleakala	Pan-STARRS 1	TIR	2.1 km	MPC · JPL
865058	2015 DA_{284}	—	January 21, 2015	Haleakala	Pan-STARRS 1	EOS	1.5 km	MPC · JPL
865059	2015 DW_{285}	—	January 29, 2015	Haleakala	Pan-STARRS 1	TIR	2.2 km	MPC · JPL
865060	2015 DH_{286}	—	February 26, 2015	Mount Lemmon	Mount Lemmon Survey	·	740 m	MPC · JPL
865061	2015 DM_{286}	—	February 23, 2015	Haleakala	Pan-STARRS 1	·	840 m	MPC · JPL
865062	2015 DV_{286}	—	February 19, 2015	Haleakala	Pan-STARRS 1	(7605)	2.3 km	MPC · JPL
865063	2015 DL_{288}	—	February 19, 2015	Mount Lemmon	Mount Lemmon Survey	·	1.0 km	MPC · JPL
865064	2015 DA_{292}	—	February 26, 2015	Mount Lemmon	Mount Lemmon Survey	·	1.1 km	MPC · JPL
865065	2015 DD_{292}	—	February 27, 2015	Haleakala	Pan-STARRS 1	KOR	1.1 km	MPC · JPL
865066	2015 DZ_{292}	—	February 16, 2015	Haleakala	Pan-STARRS 1	·	1.6 km	MPC · JPL
865067	2015 DH_{293}	—	February 24, 2015	Haleakala	Pan-STARRS 1	·	460 m	MPC · JPL
865068	2015 DN_{295}	—	February 24, 2015	Haleakala	Pan-STARRS 1	·	950 m	MPC · JPL
865069	2015 DL_{296}	—	February 20, 2015	Haleakala	Pan-STARRS 1	MAR	710 m	MPC · JPL
865070	2015 DW_{297}	—	February 18, 2015	Haleakala	Pan-STARRS 1	HNS	910 m	MPC · JPL
865071	2015 DZ_{297}	—	January 22, 2015	Haleakala	Pan-STARRS 1	H	400 m	MPC · JPL
865072	2015 DO_{299}	—	February 17, 2015	Haleakala	Pan-STARRS 1	L4	6.5 km	MPC · JPL
865073	2015 DZ_{300}	—	February 23, 2015	Haleakala	Pan-STARRS 1	·	1.0 km	MPC · JPL
865074	2015 DJ_{303}	—	January 28, 2015	Haleakala	Pan-STARRS 1	L4	6.8 km	MPC · JPL
865075	2015 DW_{307}	—	February 16, 2015	Haleakala	Pan-STARRS 1	·	1.1 km	MPC · JPL
865076	2015 DV_{308}	—	February 16, 2015	Haleakala	Pan-STARRS 1	·	590 m	MPC · JPL
865077	2015 DA_{309}	—	April 21, 2012	Kitt Peak	Spacewatch	·	560 m	MPC · JPL
865078	2015 DQ_{311}	—	February 16, 2015	Haleakala	Pan-STARRS 1	·	1.4 km	MPC · JPL
865079	2015 DV_{346}	—	February 16, 2015	Haleakala	Pan-STARRS 1	·	2.8 km	MPC · JPL
865080	2015 ER_{1}	—	January 21, 2015	Haleakala	Pan-STARRS 1	EOS	1.3 km	MPC · JPL
865081	2015 EC_{6}	—	January 20, 2015	Kitt Peak	Spacewatch	·	1.4 km	MPC · JPL
865082	2015 EH_{8}	—	January 21, 2015	Haleakala	Pan-STARRS 1	·	440 m	MPC · JPL
865083	2015 EO_{10}	—	February 9, 2015	Mount Lemmon	Mount Lemmon Survey	PHO	560 m	MPC · JPL
865084	2015 EV_{10}	—	February 13, 2004	Kitt Peak	Spacewatch	PHO	800 m	MPC · JPL
865085	2015 EN_{13}	—	February 28, 2008	Mount Lemmon	Mount Lemmon Survey	·	700 m	MPC · JPL
865086	2015 EJ_{21}	—	February 21, 2007	Mount Lemmon	Mount Lemmon Survey	·	900 m	MPC · JPL
865087	2015 EU_{21}	—	April 13, 2008	Mount Lemmon	Mount Lemmon Survey	NYS	680 m	MPC · JPL
865088	2015 EQ_{25}	—	August 26, 2012	Haleakala	Pan-STARRS 1	EUN	770 m	MPC · JPL
865089	2015 EA_{32}	—	February 17, 2015	Haleakala	Pan-STARRS 1	VER	1.9 km	MPC · JPL
865090	2015 ES_{32}	—	February 25, 2015	Kitt Peak	Spacewatch	·	900 m	MPC · JPL
865091	2015 EY_{33}	—	February 16, 2015	Haleakala	Pan-STARRS 1	·	580 m	MPC · JPL
865092	2015 EM_{34}	—	February 16, 2015	Haleakala	Pan-STARRS 1	·	890 m	MPC · JPL
865093	2015 ER_{34}	—	February 16, 2015	Haleakala	Pan-STARRS 1	·	1.4 km	MPC · JPL
865094	2015 EV_{43}	—	March 14, 2015	Haleakala	Pan-STARRS 1	·	2.4 km	MPC · JPL
865095	2015 EG_{45}	—	January 23, 2015	Haleakala	Pan-STARRS 1	EUN	900 m	MPC · JPL
865096	2015 EK_{45}	—	February 16, 2015	Haleakala	Pan-STARRS 1	·	430 m	MPC · JPL
865097	2015 EG_{47}	—	February 10, 2015	Mount Lemmon	Mount Lemmon Survey	·	510 m	MPC · JPL
865098	2015 EY_{51}	—	February 16, 2015	Haleakala	Pan-STARRS 1	·	1.5 km	MPC · JPL
865099	2015 EY_{59}	—	January 23, 2015	Haleakala	Pan-STARRS 1	·	770 m	MPC · JPL
865100	2015 EQ_{66}	—	January 25, 2015	Haleakala	Pan-STARRS 1	·	470 m	MPC · JPL

== 865101–865200 ==
back to top

Designation			Discovery			Properties		Ref
Permanent	Provisional	Named after	Date	Site	Discoverer(s)	Category	Diam.	Ref
865101	2015 EQ_{67}	—	April 5, 2005	Mount Lemmon	Mount Lemmon Survey	·	460 m	MPC · JPL
865102	2015 EO_{68}	—	January 20, 2015	Haleakala	Pan-STARRS 1	·	2.0 km	MPC · JPL
865103	2015 EZ_{68}	—	January 21, 2015	Haleakala	Pan-STARRS 1	·	690 m	MPC · JPL
865104	2015 EB_{70}	—	August 14, 2013	Haleakala	Pan-STARRS 1	·	520 m	MPC · JPL
865105	2015 EM_{72}	—	January 26, 2015	Haleakala	Pan-STARRS 1	·	470 m	MPC · JPL
865106	2015 EY_{75}	—	March 15, 2015	Haleakala	Pan-STARRS 1	·	1.7 km	MPC · JPL
865107	2015 EV_{78}	—	March 11, 2015	Mount Lemmon	Mount Lemmon Survey	·	440 m	MPC · JPL
865108	2015 EK_{79}	—	March 14, 2015	Haleakala	Pan-STARRS 1	·	450 m	MPC · JPL
865109	2015 FA_{10}	—	February 18, 2015	Haleakala	Pan-STARRS 1	·	1.4 km	MPC · JPL
865110	2015 FO_{11}	—	March 17, 2015	Haleakala	Pan-STARRS 1	·	2.6 km	MPC · JPL
865111	2015 FX_{13}	—	November 1, 2013	Mount Lemmon	Mount Lemmon Survey	EUN	820 m	MPC · JPL
865112	2015 FZ_{13}	—	March 16, 2015	Haleakala	Pan-STARRS 1	·	980 m	MPC · JPL
865113	2015 FH_{15}	—	February 18, 2015	Haleakala	Pan-STARRS 1	EUN	900 m	MPC · JPL
865114	2015 FM_{18}	—	May 24, 2011	Mount Lemmon	Mount Lemmon Survey	EUN	840 m	MPC · JPL
865115	2015 FT_{19}	—	December 31, 2013	Mount Lemmon	Mount Lemmon Survey	·	1.4 km	MPC · JPL
865116	2015 FC_{22}	—	December 30, 2013	Mount Lemmon	Mount Lemmon Survey	·	1.8 km	MPC · JPL
865117	2015 FT_{22}	—	May 21, 2011	Mount Lemmon	Mount Lemmon Survey	·	1.4 km	MPC · JPL
865118	2015 FW_{23}	—	June 4, 2002	Kitt Peak	Spacewatch	·	1.4 km	MPC · JPL
865119	2015 FC_{25}	—	January 25, 2009	Kitt Peak	Spacewatch	·	2.2 km	MPC · JPL
865120	2015 FY_{25}	—	March 16, 2015	Haleakala	Pan-STARRS 1	T_{j} (2.95)	2.6 km	MPC · JPL
865121	2015 FT_{27}	—	October 14, 2013	Mount Lemmon	Mount Lemmon Survey	MAR	770 m	MPC · JPL
865122	2015 FQ_{29}	—	March 16, 2015	Haleakala	Pan-STARRS 1	·	1.8 km	MPC · JPL
865123	2015 FU_{29}	—	March 16, 2015	Haleakala	Pan-STARRS 1	·	920 m	MPC · JPL
865124	2015 FL_{32}	—	March 16, 2015	Haleakala	Pan-STARRS 1	MAR	750 m	MPC · JPL
865125	2015 FW_{39}	—	April 24, 2008	Mount Lemmon	Mount Lemmon Survey	·	460 m	MPC · JPL
865126	2015 FJ_{40}	—	February 8, 2011	Mount Lemmon	Mount Lemmon Survey	NYS	730 m	MPC · JPL
865127	2015 FP_{55}	—	April 25, 2003	Kitt Peak	Spacewatch	EUN	820 m	MPC · JPL
865128	2015 FO_{59}	—	February 22, 2015	Haleakala	Pan-STARRS 1	·	2.2 km	MPC · JPL
865129	2015 FV_{60}	—	February 20, 2015	Haleakala	Pan-STARRS 1	TIR	1.9 km	MPC · JPL
865130	2015 FU_{64}	—	February 20, 2015	Haleakala	Pan-STARRS 1	·	1.1 km	MPC · JPL
865131	2015 FP_{66}	—	January 22, 2015	Haleakala	Pan-STARRS 1	·	1.4 km	MPC · JPL
865132	2015 FB_{69}	—	February 16, 2015	Haleakala	Pan-STARRS 1	·	1.6 km	MPC · JPL
865133	2015 FW_{69}	—	February 16, 2015	Haleakala	Pan-STARRS 1	JUN	610 m	MPC · JPL
865134	2015 FY_{70}	—	August 2, 2011	Haleakala	Pan-STARRS 1	·	1.3 km	MPC · JPL
865135	2015 FG_{71}	—	March 17, 2015	Haleakala	Pan-STARRS 1	·	1.2 km	MPC · JPL
865136	2015 FO_{75}	—	March 18, 2015	Haleakala	Pan-STARRS 1	·	1.2 km	MPC · JPL
865137	2015 FS_{75}	—	May 16, 2012	Haleakala	Pan-STARRS 1	·	730 m	MPC · JPL
865138	2015 FC_{78}	—	March 18, 2015	Haleakala	Pan-STARRS 1	MAS	620 m	MPC · JPL
865139	2015 FQ_{79}	—	November 26, 2013	Haleakala	Pan-STARRS 1	EOS	1.2 km	MPC · JPL
865140	2015 FF_{82}	—	February 20, 2015	Haleakala	Pan-STARRS 1	EOS	1.3 km	MPC · JPL
865141	2015 FJ_{83}	—	December 1, 2014	Haleakala	Pan-STARRS 1	·	1.1 km	MPC · JPL
865142	2015 FE_{84}	—	November 10, 2009	Mount Lemmon	Mount Lemmon Survey	JUN	720 m	MPC · JPL
865143	2015 FF_{85}	—	February 20, 2015	Haleakala	Pan-STARRS 1	·	1.3 km	MPC · JPL
865144	2015 FV_{87}	—	March 20, 2015	Haleakala	Pan-STARRS 1	·	510 m	MPC · JPL
865145	2015 FP_{89}	—	March 20, 2015	Haleakala	Pan-STARRS 1	·	1.3 km	MPC · JPL
865146	2015 FU_{91}	—	January 16, 2015	Haleakala	Pan-STARRS 1	·	1.3 km	MPC · JPL
865147	2015 FW_{94}	—	January 22, 2015	Haleakala	Pan-STARRS 1	·	2.3 km	MPC · JPL
865148	2015 FP_{96}	—	March 20, 2015	Haleakala	Pan-STARRS 1	·	900 m	MPC · JPL
865149	2015 FQ_{96}	—	October 26, 2008	Kitt Peak	Spacewatch	·	1.4 km	MPC · JPL
865150	2015 FZ_{97}	—	January 1, 2009	Mount Lemmon	Mount Lemmon Survey	LIX	2.6 km	MPC · JPL
865151	2015 FE_{98}	—	August 25, 2012	Kitt Peak	Spacewatch	·	770 m	MPC · JPL
865152	2015 FG_{98}	—	March 20, 2015	Haleakala	Pan-STARRS 1	·	590 m	MPC · JPL
865153	2015 FV_{103}	—	January 19, 2004	Kitt Peak	Spacewatch	·	640 m	MPC · JPL
865154	2015 FA_{104}	—	January 22, 2015	Haleakala	Pan-STARRS 1	·	940 m	MPC · JPL
865155	2015 FM_{106}	—	December 12, 2010	Kitt Peak	Spacewatch	·	550 m	MPC · JPL
865156	2015 FN_{108}	—	May 31, 2009	Mount Lemmon	Mount Lemmon Survey	·	760 m	MPC · JPL
865157	2015 FH_{109}	—	January 22, 2015	Haleakala	Pan-STARRS 1	·	740 m	MPC · JPL
865158	2015 FT_{109}	—	October 29, 2005	Kitt Peak	Spacewatch	·	920 m	MPC · JPL
865159	2015 FP_{110}	—	March 12, 1994	Kitt Peak	Spacewatch	·	1.0 km	MPC · JPL
865160	2015 FZ_{110}	—	July 4, 2003	Kitt Peak	Spacewatch	·	1.2 km	MPC · JPL
865161	2015 FW_{112}	—	October 24, 2005	Kitt Peak	Spacewatch	·	650 m	MPC · JPL
865162	2015 FX_{113}	—	November 1, 2013	Mount Lemmon	Mount Lemmon Survey	·	880 m	MPC · JPL
865163	2015 FF_{117}	—	February 25, 2015	Haleakala	Pan-STARRS 1	H	320 m	MPC · JPL
865164	2015 FD_{118}	—	January 20, 2015	Haleakala	Pan-STARRS 1	H	380 m	MPC · JPL
865165	2015 FQ_{119}	—	January 15, 2015	Haleakala	Pan-STARRS 1	·	580 m	MPC · JPL
865166	2015 FB_{121}	—	January 23, 2011	Mount Lemmon	Mount Lemmon Survey	·	990 m	MPC · JPL
865167	2015 FK_{124}	—	February 18, 2015	Haleakala	Pan-STARRS 1	GEF	760 m	MPC · JPL
865168	2015 FW_{124}	—	November 29, 2014	Haleakala	Pan-STARRS 1	·	1.0 km	MPC · JPL
865169	2015 FK_{126}	—	February 22, 2015	Haleakala	Pan-STARRS 1	·	960 m	MPC · JPL
865170	2015 FU_{127}	—	February 18, 2015	Haleakala	Pan-STARRS 1	·	1.0 km	MPC · JPL
865171	2015 FX_{130}	—	March 31, 2011	Mount Lemmon	Mount Lemmon Survey	·	930 m	MPC · JPL
865172	2015 FR_{134}	—	January 23, 2015	Haleakala	Pan-STARRS 1	·	520 m	MPC · JPL
865173	2015 FR_{135}	—	January 22, 2015	Haleakala	Pan-STARRS 1	EOS	1.3 km	MPC · JPL
865174	2015 FQ_{139}	—	March 21, 2015	Haleakala	Pan-STARRS 1	·	1.2 km	MPC · JPL
865175	2015 FZ_{140}	—	June 9, 2011	Mount Lemmon	Mount Lemmon Survey	·	1.1 km	MPC · JPL
865176	2015 FH_{141}	—	March 21, 2015	Haleakala	Pan-STARRS 1	·	480 m	MPC · JPL
865177	2015 FX_{141}	—	March 17, 2015	Mount Lemmon	Mount Lemmon Survey	THM	1.7 km	MPC · JPL
865178	2015 FM_{142}	—	March 21, 2015	Haleakala	Pan-STARRS 1	·	2.0 km	MPC · JPL
865179	2015 FP_{142}	—	May 14, 2008	Kitt Peak	Spacewatch	·	880 m	MPC · JPL
865180	2015 FL_{145}	—	January 23, 2015	Haleakala	Pan-STARRS 1	·	780 m	MPC · JPL
865181	2015 FW_{146}	—	March 21, 2015	Haleakala	Pan-STARRS 1	·	2.2 km	MPC · JPL
865182	2015 FH_{148}	—	March 21, 2015	Haleakala	Pan-STARRS 1	·	1.0 km	MPC · JPL
865183	2015 FN_{148}	—	February 11, 2011	Mount Lemmon	Mount Lemmon Survey	NYS	780 m	MPC · JPL
865184	2015 FM_{149}	—	January 30, 2011	Mount Lemmon	Mount Lemmon Survey	NYS	810 m	MPC · JPL
865185	2015 FG_{152}	—	March 21, 2015	Haleakala	Pan-STARRS 1	·	1.2 km	MPC · JPL
865186	2015 FO_{152}	—	April 14, 2002	Kitt Peak	Spacewatch	·	1.1 km	MPC · JPL
865187	2015 FJ_{153}	—	November 4, 2013	Siding Spring	Astronomical Research Institute	MAS	520 m	MPC · JPL
865188	2015 FN_{156}	—	March 21, 2015	Haleakala	Pan-STARRS 1	·	1.0 km	MPC · JPL
865189	2015 FK_{157}	—	June 6, 2011	Haleakala	Pan-STARRS 1	·	1.0 km	MPC · JPL
865190	2015 FP_{157}	—	March 21, 2015	Haleakala	Pan-STARRS 1	·	1.1 km	MPC · JPL
865191	2015 FP_{159}	—	January 23, 2015	Haleakala	Pan-STARRS 1	·	1.8 km	MPC · JPL
865192	2015 FW_{162}	—	April 3, 2008	Mount Lemmon	Mount Lemmon Survey	·	770 m	MPC · JPL
865193	2015 FX_{162}	—	March 21, 2015	Haleakala	Pan-STARRS 1	TIN	880 m	MPC · JPL
865194	2015 FR_{164}	—	May 1, 2011	Haleakala	Pan-STARRS 1	·	960 m	MPC · JPL
865195	2015 FV_{164}	—	December 31, 2013	Mount Lemmon	Mount Lemmon Survey	·	1.4 km	MPC · JPL
865196	2015 FP_{167}	—	March 21, 2015	Haleakala	Pan-STARRS 1	·	1.1 km	MPC · JPL
865197	2015 FA_{171}	—	May 21, 2012	Mount Lemmon	Mount Lemmon Survey	·	480 m	MPC · JPL
865198	2015 FF_{171}	—	February 28, 2008	Kitt Peak	Spacewatch	·	480 m	MPC · JPL
865199	2015 FR_{172}	—	June 4, 2011	Mount Lemmon	Mount Lemmon Survey	·	920 m	MPC · JPL
865200	2015 FW_{175}	—	March 21, 2015	Haleakala	Pan-STARRS 1	·	1.4 km	MPC · JPL

== 865201–865300 ==
back to top

Designation			Discovery			Properties		Ref
Permanent	Provisional	Named after	Date	Site	Discoverer(s)	Category	Diam.	Ref
865201	2015 FB_{176}	—	November 7, 2012	Mount Lemmon	Mount Lemmon Survey	·	1.1 km	MPC · JPL
865202	2015 FK_{177}	—	February 16, 2015	Haleakala	Pan-STARRS 1	·	1.6 km	MPC · JPL
865203	2015 FT_{177}	—	January 23, 2015	Haleakala	Pan-STARRS 1	·	1.2 km	MPC · JPL
865204	2015 FE_{181}	—	February 27, 2015	Haleakala	Pan-STARRS 1	·	1.6 km	MPC · JPL
865205	2015 FG_{182}	—	March 22, 2015	Mount Lemmon	Mount Lemmon Survey	·	1.1 km	MPC · JPL
865206	2015 FO_{183}	—	January 23, 2011	Mount Lemmon	Mount Lemmon Survey	NYS	640 m	MPC · JPL
865207	2015 FB_{184}	—	August 22, 2006	Cerro Tololo	Deep Ecliptic Survey	·	1.9 km	MPC · JPL
865208	2015 FV_{184}	—	March 22, 2015	Mount Lemmon	Mount Lemmon Survey	·	540 m	MPC · JPL
865209	2015 FQ_{185}	—	January 20, 2015	Haleakala	Pan-STARRS 1	·	2.1 km	MPC · JPL
865210	2015 FB_{187}	—	January 22, 2015	Haleakala	Pan-STARRS 1	·	1.2 km	MPC · JPL
865211	2015 FW_{187}	—	August 8, 2012	Haleakala	Pan-STARRS 1	·	1.2 km	MPC · JPL
865212	2015 FR_{189}	—	February 20, 2015	Haleakala	Pan-STARRS 1	·	2.9 km	MPC · JPL
865213	2015 FM_{190}	—	February 23, 2015	Haleakala	Pan-STARRS 1	·	1.6 km	MPC · JPL
865214	2015 FA_{193}	—	January 18, 2015	Haleakala	Pan-STARRS 1	·	1.4 km	MPC · JPL
865215	2015 FW_{193}	—	January 23, 2015	Haleakala	Pan-STARRS 1	·	1.1 km	MPC · JPL
865216	2015 FV_{196}	—	February 22, 2015	Haleakala	Pan-STARRS 1	·	550 m	MPC · JPL
865217	2015 FL_{197}	—	February 5, 2011	Haleakala	Pan-STARRS 1	·	1.0 km	MPC · JPL
865218	2015 FD_{200}	—	February 25, 2015	Haleakala	Pan-STARRS 1	·	1.3 km	MPC · JPL
865219	2015 FV_{200}	—	October 10, 2012	Mount Lemmon	Mount Lemmon Survey	·	2.3 km	MPC · JPL
865220	2015 FL_{201}	—	March 16, 2015	Mount Lemmon	Mount Lemmon Survey	·	1.2 km	MPC · JPL
865221	2015 FL_{204}	—	March 22, 2015	Haleakala	Pan-STARRS 1	·	2.2 km	MPC · JPL
865222	2015 FO_{204}	—	August 18, 2009	Kitt Peak	Spacewatch	·	610 m	MPC · JPL
865223	2015 FT_{209}	—	August 28, 2013	Mount Lemmon	Mount Lemmon Survey	·	600 m	MPC · JPL
865224	2015 FP_{210}	—	February 16, 2015	Haleakala	Pan-STARRS 1	·	610 m	MPC · JPL
865225	2015 FH_{217}	—	August 21, 2012	Haleakala	Pan-STARRS 1	EUN	980 m	MPC · JPL
865226	2015 FD_{220}	—	March 23, 2015	Haleakala	Pan-STARRS 1	·	830 m	MPC · JPL
865227	2015 FL_{221}	—	March 23, 2015	Haleakala	Pan-STARRS 1	·	680 m	MPC · JPL
865228	2015 FY_{224}	—	August 5, 2005	Palomar	NEAT	·	750 m	MPC · JPL
865229	2015 FS_{226}	—	March 14, 2011	Mount Lemmon	Mount Lemmon Survey	·	790 m	MPC · JPL
865230	2015 FH_{228}	—	February 27, 2015	Haleakala	Pan-STARRS 1	·	1.7 km	MPC · JPL
865231	2015 FG_{230}	—	March 23, 2015	Haleakala	Pan-STARRS 1	·	920 m	MPC · JPL
865232	2015 FC_{231}	—	February 27, 2015	Haleakala	Pan-STARRS 1	·	1.0 km	MPC · JPL
865233	2015 FA_{232}	—	March 23, 2015	Haleakala	Pan-STARRS 1	·	840 m	MPC · JPL
865234	2015 FD_{233}	—	March 23, 2015	Haleakala	Pan-STARRS 1	·	1.7 km	MPC · JPL
865235	2015 FE_{235}	—	February 27, 2015	Haleakala	Pan-STARRS 1	·	2.3 km	MPC · JPL
865236	2015 FQ_{235}	—	March 23, 2015	Haleakala	Pan-STARRS 1	·	1.2 km	MPC · JPL
865237	2015 FQ_{236}	—	March 23, 2015	Haleakala	Pan-STARRS 1	·	1.0 km	MPC · JPL
865238	2015 FQ_{237}	—	December 4, 2013	Haleakala	Pan-STARRS 1	T_{j} (2.99) · 3:2	3.3 km	MPC · JPL
865239	2015 FY_{237}	—	March 23, 2015	Haleakala	Pan-STARRS 1	·	1.9 km	MPC · JPL
865240	2015 FO_{238}	—	March 12, 2008	Kitt Peak	Spacewatch	V	400 m	MPC · JPL
865241	2015 FA_{239}	—	January 17, 2009	Kitt Peak	Spacewatch	·	2.6 km	MPC · JPL
865242	2015 FS_{244}	—	April 13, 2011	Kitt Peak	Spacewatch	·	970 m	MPC · JPL
865243	2015 FU_{246}	—	March 23, 2015	Haleakala	Pan-STARRS 1	·	2.0 km	MPC · JPL
865244	2015 FG_{247}	—	March 23, 2015	Haleakala	Pan-STARRS 1	·	890 m	MPC · JPL
865245	2015 FF_{250}	—	March 23, 2015	Haleakala	Pan-STARRS 1	·	1.3 km	MPC · JPL
865246	2015 FN_{251}	—	January 27, 2006	Mount Lemmon	Mount Lemmon Survey	·	930 m	MPC · JPL
865247	2015 FO_{251}	—	March 23, 2015	Haleakala	Pan-STARRS 1	·	1.1 km	MPC · JPL
865248	2015 FD_{259}	—	March 24, 2015	Haleakala	Pan-STARRS 1	·	1.4 km	MPC · JPL
865249	2015 FL_{263}	—	April 30, 2011	Haleakala	Pan-STARRS 1	·	1.3 km	MPC · JPL
865250	2015 FC_{267}	—	January 28, 2015	Haleakala	Pan-STARRS 1	MAR	770 m	MPC · JPL
865251	2015 FD_{267}	—	February 28, 2008	Kitt Peak	Spacewatch	·	660 m	MPC · JPL
865252	2015 FC_{268}	—	February 16, 2015	Haleakala	Pan-STARRS 1	·	860 m	MPC · JPL
865253	2015 FX_{268}	—	January 2, 2011	Mount Lemmon	Mount Lemmon Survey	MAS	510 m	MPC · JPL
865254	2015 FJ_{276}	—	January 28, 2015	Haleakala	Pan-STARRS 1	·	2.1 km	MPC · JPL
865255	2015 FB_{281}	—	February 16, 2015	Haleakala	Pan-STARRS 1	(5)	890 m	MPC · JPL
865256	2015 FZ_{281}	—	May 16, 2007	Mount Lemmon	Mount Lemmon Survey	·	1.1 km	MPC · JPL
865257	2015 FA_{282}	—	February 18, 2015	Haleakala	Pan-STARRS 1	·	880 m	MPC · JPL
865258	2015 FF_{285}	—	February 18, 2015	Haleakala	Pan-STARRS 1	·	540 m	MPC · JPL
865259	2015 FM_{289}	—	November 3, 2010	Mount Lemmon	Mount Lemmon Survey	·	550 m	MPC · JPL
865260	2015 FW_{293}	—	January 28, 2015	Haleakala	Pan-STARRS 1	·	1.3 km	MPC · JPL
865261	2015 FE_{297}	—	January 30, 2015	Haleakala	Pan-STARRS 1	·	1.2 km	MPC · JPL
865262	2015 FO_{298}	—	March 16, 2007	Kitt Peak	Spacewatch	H	330 m	MPC · JPL
865263	2015 FC_{299}	—	March 28, 2015	Haleakala	Pan-STARRS 1	·	850 m	MPC · JPL
865264	2015 FW_{305}	—	September 13, 2007	Mount Lemmon	Mount Lemmon Survey	·	1.1 km	MPC · JPL
865265	2015 FY_{310}	—	March 25, 2015	Haleakala	Pan-STARRS 1	·	1.3 km	MPC · JPL
865266	2015 FL_{312}	—	September 24, 2008	Mount Lemmon	Mount Lemmon Survey	·	1.7 km	MPC · JPL
865267	2015 FT_{316}	—	March 25, 2015	Haleakala	Pan-STARRS 1	·	480 m	MPC · JPL
865268	2015 FB_{317}	—	March 25, 2015	Haleakala	Pan-STARRS 1	·	710 m	MPC · JPL
865269	2015 FK_{322}	—	March 25, 2015	Haleakala	Pan-STARRS 1	·	2.6 km	MPC · JPL
865270	2015 FR_{322}	—	September 30, 2006	Mount Lemmon	Mount Lemmon Survey	·	2.9 km	MPC · JPL
865271	2015 FU_{324}	—	May 18, 2002	Palomar	NEAT	·	1.2 km	MPC · JPL
865272	2015 FL_{327}	—	March 25, 2015	Haleakala	Pan-STARRS 1	·	900 m	MPC · JPL
865273	2015 FH_{328}	—	March 25, 2015	Haleakala	Pan-STARRS 1	·	1.4 km	MPC · JPL
865274	2015 FD_{339}	—	March 30, 2015	Haleakala	Pan-STARRS 1	·	1.4 km	MPC · JPL
865275	2015 FA_{340}	—	January 23, 2015	Haleakala	Pan-STARRS 1	·	1.0 km	MPC · JPL
865276	2015 FE_{348}	—	May 12, 2011	Mount Lemmon	Mount Lemmon Survey	EUN	800 m	MPC · JPL
865277	2015 FJ_{348}	—	March 16, 2015	Haleakala	Pan-STARRS 1	·	1.4 km	MPC · JPL
865278	2015 FS_{348}	—	March 16, 2015	Haleakala	Pan-STARRS 1	MAR	800 m	MPC · JPL
865279	2015 FG_{350}	—	November 19, 2009	La Sagra	OAM	·	1.2 km	MPC · JPL
865280	2015 FJ_{353}	—	March 17, 2015	Haleakala	Pan-STARRS 1	·	530 m	MPC · JPL
865281	2015 FK_{353}	—	March 17, 2015	Haleakala	Pan-STARRS 1	·	1.1 km	MPC · JPL
865282	2015 FM_{353}	—	March 17, 2015	Haleakala	Pan-STARRS 1	·	2.1 km	MPC · JPL
865283	2015 FY_{354}	—	August 27, 2009	Kitt Peak	Spacewatch	3:2	3.5 km	MPC · JPL
865284	2015 FD_{356}	—	March 17, 2015	Haleakala	Pan-STARRS 1	H	310 m	MPC · JPL
865285	2015 FP_{358}	—	October 17, 2012	Haleakala	Pan-STARRS 1	·	1.3 km	MPC · JPL
865286	2015 FW_{358}	—	January 29, 2011	Kitt Peak	Spacewatch	NYS	780 m	MPC · JPL
865287	2015 FZ_{360}	—	March 17, 2015	Haleakala	Pan-STARRS 1	·	2.6 km	MPC · JPL
865288	2015 FL_{361}	—	March 17, 2015	Haleakala	Pan-STARRS 1	·	1.8 km	MPC · JPL
865289	2015 FR_{363}	—	February 17, 2015	Haleakala	Pan-STARRS 1	·	510 m	MPC · JPL
865290	2015 FB_{364}	—	February 8, 2011	Mount Lemmon	Mount Lemmon Survey	·	980 m	MPC · JPL
865291	2015 FW_{369}	—	January 22, 2015	Haleakala	Pan-STARRS 1	·	950 m	MPC · JPL
865292	2015 FW_{371}	—	March 18, 2015	Haleakala	Pan-STARRS 1	·	1.0 km	MPC · JPL
865293	2015 FP_{373}	—	March 18, 2015	Haleakala	Pan-STARRS 1	·	1.1 km	MPC · JPL
865294	2015 FH_{374}	—	March 18, 2015	Haleakala	Pan-STARRS 1	·	2.1 km	MPC · JPL
865295	2015 FH_{376}	—	January 26, 2015	Haleakala	Pan-STARRS 1	EOS	1.3 km	MPC · JPL
865296	2015 FF_{378}	—	February 20, 2015	Haleakala	Pan-STARRS 1	URS	2.4 km	MPC · JPL
865297	2015 FN_{379}	—	January 25, 2015	Haleakala	Pan-STARRS 1	·	900 m	MPC · JPL
865298	2015 FD_{382}	—	February 20, 2015	Haleakala	Pan-STARRS 1	·	760 m	MPC · JPL
865299	2015 FN_{388}	—	January 22, 2015	Haleakala	Pan-STARRS 1	·	2.1 km	MPC · JPL
865300	2015 FB_{391}	—	November 10, 2013	Mount Lemmon	Mount Lemmon Survey	·	970 m	MPC · JPL

== 865301–865400 ==
back to top

Designation			Discovery			Properties		Ref
Permanent	Provisional	Named after	Date	Site	Discoverer(s)	Category	Diam.	Ref
865301	2015 FE_{393}	—	March 28, 2015	Haleakala	Pan-STARRS 1	H	320 m	MPC · JPL
865302	2015 FU_{394}	—	March 16, 2015	Mount Lemmon	Mount Lemmon Survey	T_{j} (2.72)	2.5 km	MPC · JPL
865303	2015 FV_{394}	—	April 21, 2006	Mount Lemmon	Mount Lemmon Survey	·	1.1 km	MPC · JPL
865304	2015 FU_{395}	—	March 28, 2015	Haleakala	Pan-STARRS 1	·	2.5 km	MPC · JPL
865305	2015 FB_{396}	—	March 29, 2015	Haleakala	Pan-STARRS 1	·	880 m	MPC · JPL
865306	2015 FG_{396}	—	June 22, 2011	Mount Lemmon	Mount Lemmon Survey	·	1.2 km	MPC · JPL
865307	2015 FE_{402}	—	January 23, 2015	Haleakala	Pan-STARRS 1	·	910 m	MPC · JPL
865308	2015 FT_{403}	—	November 8, 2008	Mount Lemmon	Mount Lemmon Survey	HNS	960 m	MPC · JPL
865309	2015 FH_{405}	—	March 21, 2015	Haleakala	Pan-STARRS 1	EUN	710 m	MPC · JPL
865310	2015 FZ_{406}	—	January 22, 2015	Haleakala	Pan-STARRS 1	·	830 m	MPC · JPL
865311	2015 FG_{409}	—	September 19, 2007	Kitt Peak	Spacewatch	EUN	890 m	MPC · JPL
865312	2015 FE_{410}	—	March 22, 2015	Haleakala	Pan-STARRS 1	·	1.4 km	MPC · JPL
865313	2015 FR_{410}	—	March 24, 2015	Mount Lemmon	Mount Lemmon Survey	·	980 m	MPC · JPL
865314	2015 FB_{411}	—	March 25, 2015	Haleakala	Pan-STARRS 1	·	1.0 km	MPC · JPL
865315	2015 FJ_{412}	—	June 5, 2011	Kitt Peak	Spacewatch	·	950 m	MPC · JPL
865316	2015 FD_{414}	—	March 30, 2015	Haleakala	Pan-STARRS 1	·	1.2 km	MPC · JPL
865317	2015 FJ_{415}	—	March 31, 2015	Haleakala	Pan-STARRS 1	·	780 m	MPC · JPL
865318	2015 FF_{416}	—	September 6, 2007	Siding Spring	SSS	·	1.5 km	MPC · JPL
865319	2015 FU_{416}	—	March 18, 2015	Haleakala	Pan-STARRS 1	H	360 m	MPC · JPL
865320	2015 FP_{418}	—	March 21, 2015	Haleakala	Pan-STARRS 1	·	1.8 km	MPC · JPL
865321	2015 FB_{419}	—	March 25, 2015	Haleakala	Pan-STARRS 1	JUN	870 m	MPC · JPL
865322	2015 FD_{419}	—	March 25, 2015	Haleakala	Pan-STARRS 1	·	460 m	MPC · JPL
865323	2015 FL_{419}	—	March 17, 2015	Mount Lemmon	Mount Lemmon Survey	·	1.2 km	MPC · JPL
865324	2015 FN_{419}	—	March 20, 2015	Haleakala	Pan-STARRS 1	·	1.1 km	MPC · JPL
865325	2015 FJ_{420}	—	March 27, 2015	Kitt Peak	Spacewatch	·	1.5 km	MPC · JPL
865326	2015 FR_{420}	—	March 22, 2015	Haleakala	Pan-STARRS 1	·	1.4 km	MPC · JPL
865327	2015 FN_{424}	—	March 28, 2015	Mount Lemmon	Mount Lemmon Survey	·	2.3 km	MPC · JPL
865328	2015 FK_{426}	—	March 21, 2015	Cerro Paranal	Gaia Ground Based Optical Tracking	·	430 m	MPC · JPL
865329	2015 FE_{428}	—	March 27, 2015	Haleakala	Pan-STARRS 1	·	1.0 km	MPC · JPL
865330	2015 FR_{428}	—	March 17, 2015	Haleakala	Pan-STARRS 1	·	1.5 km	MPC · JPL
865331	2015 FG_{429}	—	March 21, 2015	Haleakala	Pan-STARRS 1	·	1.9 km	MPC · JPL
865332	2015 FK_{429}	—	March 17, 2015	Mount Lemmon	Mount Lemmon Survey	·	2.1 km	MPC · JPL
865333	2015 FN_{429}	—	March 28, 2015	Haleakala	Pan-STARRS 1	·	1.4 km	MPC · JPL
865334	2015 FT_{429}	—	March 22, 2015	Haleakala	Pan-STARRS 1	·	450 m	MPC · JPL
865335	2015 FD_{430}	—	March 16, 2015	Haleakala	Pan-STARRS 1	·	1.2 km	MPC · JPL
865336	2015 FA_{431}	—	March 30, 2015	Haleakala	Pan-STARRS 1	V	470 m	MPC · JPL
865337	2015 FE_{431}	—	March 23, 2015	Mount Lemmon	Mount Lemmon Survey	AEO	920 m	MPC · JPL
865338	2015 FP_{433}	—	March 28, 2015	Haleakala	Pan-STARRS 1	·	1.3 km	MPC · JPL
865339	2015 FB_{437}	—	March 28, 2015	Haleakala	Pan-STARRS 1	·	1.2 km	MPC · JPL
865340	2015 FW_{438}	—	March 27, 2015	Kitt Peak	Spacewatch	EOS	1.3 km	MPC · JPL
865341	2015 FN_{439}	—	March 28, 2015	Haleakala	Pan-STARRS 1	·	710 m	MPC · JPL
865342	2015 FU_{439}	—	March 17, 2015	Haleakala	Pan-STARRS 1	·	630 m	MPC · JPL
865343	2015 FW_{441}	—	March 18, 2015	Haleakala	Pan-STARRS 1	·	1.6 km	MPC · JPL
865344	2015 FU_{442}	—	November 4, 2011	Mount Lemmon	Mount Lemmon Survey	·	2.6 km	MPC · JPL
865345	2015 FZ_{443}	—	March 21, 2015	Cerro Paranal	Gaia Ground Based Optical Tracking	EOS	1.5 km	MPC · JPL
865346	2015 FF_{444}	—	March 28, 2015	Haleakala	Pan-STARRS 1	MAR	860 m	MPC · JPL
865347	2015 FD_{445}	—	March 16, 2015	Haleakala	Pan-STARRS 1	·	2.3 km	MPC · JPL
865348	2015 FL_{446}	—	March 21, 2015	Haleakala	Pan-STARRS 1	·	1.2 km	MPC · JPL
865349	2015 FT_{446}	—	March 16, 2015	Kitt Peak	Spacewatch	·	940 m	MPC · JPL
865350	2015 FV_{446}	—	March 25, 2015	Mount Lemmon	Mount Lemmon Survey	·	530 m	MPC · JPL
865351	2015 FG_{448}	—	March 22, 2015	Haleakala	Pan-STARRS 1	·	550 m	MPC · JPL
865352	2015 FQ_{448}	—	March 17, 2015	Haleakala	Pan-STARRS 1	·	570 m	MPC · JPL
865353	2015 FQ_{451}	—	March 25, 2015	Haleakala	Pan-STARRS 1	·	2.2 km	MPC · JPL
865354	2015 FT_{451}	—	March 22, 2015	Haleakala	Pan-STARRS 1	·	1.1 km	MPC · JPL
865355	2015 FK_{452}	—	March 16, 2015	Mount Lemmon	Mount Lemmon Survey	H	340 m	MPC · JPL
865356	2015 FN_{452}	—	March 21, 2015	Haleakala	Pan-STARRS 1	·	1.1 km	MPC · JPL
865357	2015 FY_{452}	—	March 28, 2015	Haleakala	Pan-STARRS 1	·	1.1 km	MPC · JPL
865358	2015 FZ_{454}	—	March 18, 2015	Haleakala	Pan-STARRS 1	JUN	1.1 km	MPC · JPL
865359	2015 FP_{455}	—	March 21, 2015	Haleakala	Pan-STARRS 1	T_{j} (2.96) · 3:2	3.6 km	MPC · JPL
865360	2015 FQ_{456}	—	March 24, 2015	Haleakala	Pan-STARRS 1	·	1.2 km	MPC · JPL
865361	2015 FQ_{458}	—	March 29, 2015	Haleakala	Pan-STARRS 1	·	500 m	MPC · JPL
865362	2015 FZ_{465}	—	March 21, 2015	Haleakala	Pan-STARRS 1	·	1.0 km	MPC · JPL
865363	2015 FB_{467}	—	March 17, 2015	Mount Lemmon	Mount Lemmon Survey	KOR	1.1 km	MPC · JPL
865364 Daianji	2015 FX_{488}	Daianji	March 18, 2015	Mauna Kea	COIAS	·	830 m	MPC · JPL
865365	2015 FV_{493}	—	March 18, 2015	Mauna Kea	COIAS	·	1.6 km	MPC · JPL
865366	2015 GB	—	June 5, 2011	Catalina	CSS	·	1.6 km	MPC · JPL
865367	2015 GQ_{2}	—	March 20, 2001	Kitt Peak	Spacewatch	·	1.0 km	MPC · JPL
865368	2015 GD_{3}	—	March 23, 2015	Mount Lemmon	Mount Lemmon Survey	·	490 m	MPC · JPL
865369	2015 GF_{4}	—	April 10, 2015	Mount Lemmon	Mount Lemmon Survey	·	1.3 km	MPC · JPL
865370	2015 GO_{4}	—	March 29, 2015	Haleakala	Pan-STARRS 1	·	540 m	MPC · JPL
865371	2015 GQ_{8}	—	May 25, 2011	Mount Lemmon	Mount Lemmon Survey	EUN	780 m	MPC · JPL
865372	2015 GW_{10}	—	December 20, 2009	Mount Lemmon	Mount Lemmon Survey	·	1.2 km	MPC · JPL
865373	2015 GO_{13}	—	February 23, 2015	Haleakala	Pan-STARRS 1	H	330 m	MPC · JPL
865374	2015 GY_{13}	—	April 13, 2015	Haleakala	Pan-STARRS 1	H	360 m	MPC · JPL
865375	2015 GO_{14}	—	March 24, 2015	Mount Lemmon	Mount Lemmon Survey	·	840 m	MPC · JPL
865376	2015 GX_{14}	—	October 11, 2012	Haleakala	Pan-STARRS 1	KOR	1.1 km	MPC · JPL
865377	2015 GB_{17}	—	January 23, 2015	Haleakala	Pan-STARRS 1	EUN	780 m	MPC · JPL
865378	2015 GT_{22}	—	June 28, 2011	Mount Lemmon	Mount Lemmon Survey	·	1.6 km	MPC · JPL
865379	2015 GA_{23}	—	April 4, 2015	Haleakala	Pan-STARRS 1	·	1.3 km	MPC · JPL
865380	2015 GF_{25}	—	September 11, 2007	Mount Lemmon	Mount Lemmon Survey	·	1.2 km	MPC · JPL
865381	2015 GO_{25}	—	February 23, 2015	Haleakala	Pan-STARRS 1	TIR	2.1 km	MPC · JPL
865382	2015 GE_{27}	—	March 18, 2015	Haleakala	Pan-STARRS 1	·	2.1 km	MPC · JPL
865383	2015 GT_{27}	—	February 17, 2007	Kitt Peak	Spacewatch	·	820 m	MPC · JPL
865384	2015 GU_{27}	—	October 1, 2008	Kitt Peak	Spacewatch	AGN	850 m	MPC · JPL
865385	2015 GU_{31}	—	March 23, 2006	Mount Lemmon	Mount Lemmon Survey	CLO	1.5 km	MPC · JPL
865386	2015 GX_{36}	—	January 14, 2011	Kitt Peak	Spacewatch	·	840 m	MPC · JPL
865387	2015 GS_{39}	—	March 27, 2015	Haleakala	Pan-STARRS 1	·	590 m	MPC · JPL
865388	2015 GH_{40}	—	November 7, 2013	Kitt Peak	Spacewatch	EUN	860 m	MPC · JPL
865389	2015 GA_{43}	—	April 15, 2015	Haleakala	Pan-STARRS 1	·	520 m	MPC · JPL
865390	2015 GS_{44}	—	September 28, 2008	Kitt Peak	Spacewatch	H	350 m	MPC · JPL
865391	2015 GF_{46}	—	January 18, 2015	Roque de los Muchachos	EURONEAR	·	940 m	MPC · JPL
865392	2015 GZ_{46}	—	March 25, 2015	Haleakala	Pan-STARRS 1	·	1.2 km	MPC · JPL
865393	2015 GV_{48}	—	January 23, 2015	Haleakala	Pan-STARRS 1	·	1.0 km	MPC · JPL
865394	2015 GL_{59}	—	April 10, 2015	Kitt Peak	Spacewatch	·	510 m	MPC · JPL
865395	2015 GY_{59}	—	April 4, 2015	Haleakala	Pan-STARRS 1	JUN	840 m	MPC · JPL
865396	2015 GV_{61}	—	April 10, 2015	Mount Lemmon	Mount Lemmon Survey	·	920 m	MPC · JPL
865397	2015 GA_{62}	—	April 13, 2015	Mount Lemmon	Mount Lemmon Survey	·	440 m	MPC · JPL
865398	2015 GF_{62}	—	April 15, 2015	Mount Lemmon	Mount Lemmon Survey	·	1.9 km	MPC · JPL
865399	2015 GV_{62}	—	April 15, 2015	Kitt Peak	Research and Education Collaborative Occultation Network	·	2.0 km	MPC · JPL
865400	2015 GQ_{64}	—	April 12, 2015	Haleakala	Pan-STARRS 1	·	1.4 km	MPC · JPL

== 865401–865500 ==
back to top

Designation			Discovery			Properties		Ref
Permanent	Provisional	Named after	Date	Site	Discoverer(s)	Category	Diam.	Ref
865401	2015 GO_{65}	—	April 10, 2015	Mount Lemmon	Mount Lemmon Survey	·	670 m	MPC · JPL
865402	2015 GT_{67}	—	January 23, 2015	Haleakala	Pan-STARRS 1	H	340 m	MPC · JPL
865403	2015 GT_{68}	—	January 31, 2009	Mount Lemmon	Mount Lemmon Survey	·	1.8 km	MPC · JPL
865404	2015 GE_{72}	—	April 13, 2015	Haleakala	Pan-STARRS 1	KOR	920 m	MPC · JPL
865405	2015 GK_{72}	—	April 9, 2015	Mount Lemmon	Mount Lemmon Survey	·	410 m	MPC · JPL
865406	2015 HX_{4}	—	January 21, 2015	Haleakala	Pan-STARRS 1	H	390 m	MPC · JPL
865407	2015 HY_{9}	—	April 8, 2010	Kitt Peak	Spacewatch	H	390 m	MPC · JPL
865408	2015 HC_{12}	—	February 20, 2006	Mount Lemmon	Mount Lemmon Survey	·	1.2 km	MPC · JPL
865409	2015 HK_{14}	—	February 11, 2015	Mount Lemmon	Mount Lemmon Survey	·	2.0 km	MPC · JPL
865410	2015 HQ_{17}	—	April 9, 2015	Mount Lemmon	Mount Lemmon Survey	·	480 m	MPC · JPL
865411	2015 HY_{18}	—	April 11, 2015	Mount Lemmon	Mount Lemmon Survey	·	870 m	MPC · JPL
865412	2015 HJ_{20}	—	August 14, 2012	Haleakala	Pan-STARRS 1	MAS	640 m	MPC · JPL
865413	2015 HO_{22}	—	August 14, 2012	Haleakala	Pan-STARRS 1	·	930 m	MPC · JPL
865414	2015 HZ_{22}	—	October 1, 2005	Kitt Peak	Spacewatch	EUP	2.4 km	MPC · JPL
865415	2015 HD_{23}	—	March 21, 2015	Haleakala	Pan-STARRS 1	·	1.2 km	MPC · JPL
865416	2015 HC_{25}	—	February 13, 2011	Mount Lemmon	Mount Lemmon Survey	MAS	480 m	MPC · JPL
865417	2015 HU_{30}	—	March 25, 2006	Mount Lemmon	Mount Lemmon Survey	·	1.3 km	MPC · JPL
865418	2015 HO_{34}	—	June 7, 2008	Kitt Peak	Spacewatch	NYS	960 m	MPC · JPL
865419	2015 HW_{35}	—	April 20, 2015	Haleakala	Pan-STARRS 1	·	1.2 km	MPC · JPL
865420	2015 HY_{38}	—	March 28, 2015	Haleakala	Pan-STARRS 1	DOR	1.7 km	MPC · JPL
865421	2015 HD_{43}	—	March 17, 2015	Haleakala	Pan-STARRS 1	H	320 m	MPC · JPL
865422	2015 HT_{45}	—	March 25, 2015	Haleakala	Pan-STARRS 1	·	500 m	MPC · JPL
865423	2015 HN_{46}	—	April 16, 2015	Haleakala	Pan-STARRS 1	·	1.1 km	MPC · JPL
865424	2015 HY_{46}	—	March 25, 2015	Haleakala	Pan-STARRS 1	·	470 m	MPC · JPL
865425	2015 HE_{47}	—	May 9, 2011	Mount Lemmon	Mount Lemmon Survey	·	1.2 km	MPC · JPL
865426	2015 HK_{50}	—	February 16, 2015	Haleakala	Pan-STARRS 1	MAR	740 m	MPC · JPL
865427	2015 HN_{52}	—	January 23, 2015	Haleakala	Pan-STARRS 1	·	900 m	MPC · JPL
865428	2015 HV_{54}	—	March 21, 2015	Haleakala	Pan-STARRS 1	·	940 m	MPC · JPL
865429	2015 HG_{55}	—	September 4, 2011	Haleakala	Pan-STARRS 1	·	1.2 km	MPC · JPL
865430	2015 HM_{56}	—	August 4, 2005	Palomar	NEAT	·	440 m	MPC · JPL
865431	2015 HC_{59}	—	April 18, 2015	Haleakala	Pan-STARRS 1	·	1.5 km	MPC · JPL
865432	2015 HM_{61}	—	October 7, 2005	Mount Lemmon	Mount Lemmon Survey	·	2.0 km	MPC · JPL
865433	2015 HR_{61}	—	April 18, 2015	Mount Lemmon	Mount Lemmon Survey	·	710 m	MPC · JPL
865434	2015 HK_{62}	—	January 14, 2011	Mount Lemmon	Mount Lemmon Survey	·	630 m	MPC · JPL
865435	2015 HA_{63}	—	March 18, 2015	Haleakala	Pan-STARRS 1	·	670 m	MPC · JPL
865436	2015 HT_{63}	—	March 29, 2008	Kitt Peak	Spacewatch	·	550 m	MPC · JPL
865437	2015 HC_{64}	—	April 23, 2015	Haleakala	Pan-STARRS 1	·	1.1 km	MPC · JPL
865438	2015 HF_{66}	—	March 17, 2015	Haleakala	Pan-STARRS 1	VER	2.3 km	MPC · JPL
865439	2015 HW_{70}	—	March 2, 2006	Kitt Peak	Spacewatch	·	920 m	MPC · JPL
865440	2015 HY_{71}	—	October 18, 2012	Haleakala	Pan-STARRS 1	·	1.1 km	MPC · JPL
865441	2015 HL_{73}	—	January 21, 1996	Kitt Peak	Spacewatch	ERI	830 m	MPC · JPL
865442	2015 HF_{74}	—	January 30, 2011	Haleakala	Pan-STARRS 1	·	640 m	MPC · JPL
865443	2015 HH_{78}	—	April 23, 2015	Haleakala	Pan-STARRS 1	·	1.5 km	MPC · JPL
865444	2015 HE_{79}	—	October 23, 2012	Mount Lemmon	Mount Lemmon Survey	MAS	540 m	MPC · JPL
865445	2015 HL_{79}	—	April 23, 2015	Haleakala	Pan-STARRS 1	NYS	680 m	MPC · JPL
865446	2015 HV_{81}	—	February 23, 2007	Mount Lemmon	Mount Lemmon Survey	MAS	540 m	MPC · JPL
865447	2015 HW_{81}	—	April 23, 2015	Haleakala	Pan-STARRS 1	·	1.2 km	MPC · JPL
865448	2015 HP_{82}	—	April 23, 2015	Haleakala	Pan-STARRS 1	·	510 m	MPC · JPL
865449	2015 HG_{83}	—	April 23, 2015	Haleakala	Pan-STARRS 1	·	520 m	MPC · JPL
865450	2015 HV_{84}	—	April 23, 2015	Haleakala	Pan-STARRS 1	HNS	980 m	MPC · JPL
865451	2015 HR_{86}	—	April 23, 2015	Haleakala	Pan-STARRS 1	MIS	1.8 km	MPC · JPL
865452	2015 HJ_{87}	—	May 31, 2006	Kitt Peak	Spacewatch	·	1.2 km	MPC · JPL
865453	2015 HK_{94}	—	April 23, 2015	Haleakala	Pan-STARRS 1	·	510 m	MPC · JPL
865454	2015 HN_{97}	—	November 6, 2012	Haleakala	Pan-STARRS 1	·	1.1 km	MPC · JPL
865455	2015 HY_{97}	—	September 28, 2006	Mount Lemmon	Mount Lemmon Survey	·	440 m	MPC · JPL
865456	2015 HZ_{97}	—	December 9, 2010	Mount Lemmon	Mount Lemmon Survey	·	470 m	MPC · JPL
865457	2015 HX_{100}	—	April 23, 2015	Haleakala	Pan-STARRS 1	·	1.7 km	MPC · JPL
865458	2015 HL_{104}	—	September 14, 2007	Catalina	CSS	·	1.7 km	MPC · JPL
865459	2015 HQ_{105}	—	March 22, 2015	Haleakala	Pan-STARRS 1	·	1.5 km	MPC · JPL
865460	2015 HX_{107}	—	September 12, 2007	Mount Lemmon	Mount Lemmon Survey	·	1.4 km	MPC · JPL
865461	2015 HX_{110}	—	February 16, 2015	Haleakala	Pan-STARRS 1	EUN	870 m	MPC · JPL
865462	2015 HX_{111}	—	April 12, 2015	Haleakala	Pan-STARRS 1	PHO	770 m	MPC · JPL
865463	2015 HD_{112}	—	November 12, 2012	Haleakala	Pan-STARRS 1	·	1.3 km	MPC · JPL
865464	2015 HR_{112}	—	April 23, 2015	Haleakala	Pan-STARRS 1	TIR	1.9 km	MPC · JPL
865465	2015 HU_{116}	—	April 23, 2015	Haleakala	Pan-STARRS 1	AMO	350 m	MPC · JPL
865466	2015 HM_{117}	—	December 19, 2003	Socorro	LINEAR	H	540 m	MPC · JPL
865467	2015 HV_{118}	—	December 27, 2013	Kitt Peak	Spacewatch	·	990 m	MPC · JPL
865468	2015 HG_{121}	—	September 14, 2013	Mount Lemmon	Mount Lemmon Survey	·	920 m	MPC · JPL
865469	2015 HW_{125}	—	April 23, 2015	Haleakala	Pan-STARRS 1	·	500 m	MPC · JPL
865470	2015 HK_{126}	—	October 9, 2013	Mount Lemmon	Mount Lemmon Survey	·	920 m	MPC · JPL
865471	2015 HS_{127}	—	April 15, 2015	Kitt Peak	Spacewatch	·	1.3 km	MPC · JPL
865472	2015 HZ_{127}	—	October 7, 2008	Mount Lemmon	Mount Lemmon Survey	·	710 m	MPC · JPL
865473	2015 HQ_{130}	—	April 23, 2015	Haleakala	Pan-STARRS 1	·	1.1 km	MPC · JPL
865474	2015 HH_{131}	—	April 23, 2015	Haleakala	Pan-STARRS 1	·	1.1 km	MPC · JPL
865475	2015 HD_{132}	—	April 23, 2015	Haleakala	Pan-STARRS 1	·	1.1 km	MPC · JPL
865476	2015 HJ_{132}	—	May 3, 2008	Kitt Peak	Spacewatch	·	570 m	MPC · JPL
865477	2015 HB_{134}	—	April 23, 2015	Haleakala	Pan-STARRS 1	·	1.4 km	MPC · JPL
865478	2015 HE_{136}	—	April 14, 2015	Kitt Peak	Spacewatch	NYS	640 m	MPC · JPL
865479	2015 HS_{136}	—	April 23, 2015	Haleakala	Pan-STARRS 1	·	970 m	MPC · JPL
865480	2015 HX_{136}	—	April 23, 2015	Haleakala	Pan-STARRS 1	·	1.2 km	MPC · JPL
865481	2015 HC_{140}	—	August 25, 2012	Haleakala	Pan-STARRS 1	·	920 m	MPC · JPL
865482	2015 HD_{143}	—	April 23, 2015	Haleakala	Pan-STARRS 1	3:2	3.3 km	MPC · JPL
865483	2015 HY_{145}	—	July 26, 2011	Haleakala	Pan-STARRS 1	·	1.4 km	MPC · JPL
865484	2015 HC_{146}	—	April 23, 2015	Haleakala	Pan-STARRS 1	TIR	2.5 km	MPC · JPL
865485	2015 HD_{148}	—	October 9, 2012	Haleakala	Pan-STARRS 1	·	920 m	MPC · JPL
865486	2015 HH_{155}	—	January 28, 2015	Haleakala	Pan-STARRS 1	·	1.2 km	MPC · JPL
865487	2015 HL_{158}	—	September 13, 2007	Mount Lemmon	Mount Lemmon Survey	AEO	820 m	MPC · JPL
865488	2015 HF_{160}	—	November 28, 2013	Mount Lemmon	Mount Lemmon Survey	·	1.2 km	MPC · JPL
865489	2015 HL_{160}	—	April 24, 2015	Haleakala	Pan-STARRS 1	·	480 m	MPC · JPL
865490	2015 HT_{161}	—	September 28, 2006	Kitt Peak	Spacewatch	·	460 m	MPC · JPL
865491	2015 HH_{162}	—	October 6, 2012	Mount Lemmon	Mount Lemmon Survey	·	1.2 km	MPC · JPL
865492	2015 HE_{163}	—	October 9, 2007	Mount Lemmon	Mount Lemmon Survey	·	1.3 km	MPC · JPL
865493	2015 HU_{163}	—	April 24, 2015	Haleakala	Pan-STARRS 1	·	1.1 km	MPC · JPL
865494	2015 HB_{165}	—	September 29, 2011	Mount Lemmon	Mount Lemmon Survey	·	1.2 km	MPC · JPL
865495	2015 HO_{178}	—	February 2, 2009	Mount Lemmon	Mount Lemmon Survey	·	2.7 km	MPC · JPL
865496	2015 HH_{188}	—	April 23, 2015	Haleakala	Pan-STARRS 1	DOR	1.6 km	MPC · JPL
865497	2015 HK_{188}	—	April 16, 2015	Mount Lemmon	Mount Lemmon Survey	·	910 m	MPC · JPL
865498	2015 HM_{189}	—	April 18, 2015	Haleakala	Pan-STARRS 1	·	2.8 km	MPC · JPL
865499	2015 HM_{193}	—	April 25, 2015	Haleakala	Pan-STARRS 1	(5)	750 m	MPC · JPL
865500	2015 HA_{194}	—	July 28, 2011	Haleakala	Pan-STARRS 1	DOR	1.6 km	MPC · JPL

== 865501–865600 ==
back to top

Designation			Discovery			Properties		Ref
Permanent	Provisional	Named after	Date	Site	Discoverer(s)	Category	Diam.	Ref
865501	2015 HH_{201}	—	April 23, 2015	Haleakala	Pan-STARRS 1	MRX	690 m	MPC · JPL
865502	2015 HF_{203}	—	April 25, 2015	Haleakala	Pan-STARRS 1	·	1.0 km	MPC · JPL
865503	2015 HY_{203}	—	April 25, 2015	Haleakala	Pan-STARRS 1	·	990 m	MPC · JPL
865504	2015 HR_{204}	—	April 18, 2015	Haleakala	Pan-STARRS 1	(194)	1.3 km	MPC · JPL
865505	2015 HW_{205}	—	April 18, 2015	Haleakala	Pan-STARRS 1	ADE	1.2 km	MPC · JPL
865506	2015 HP_{207}	—	April 19, 2015	Mount Lemmon	Mount Lemmon Survey	·	1.1 km	MPC · JPL
865507	2015 HD_{208}	—	November 9, 2013	Haleakala	Pan-STARRS 1	·	870 m	MPC · JPL
865508	2015 HJ_{210}	—	April 18, 2015	Haleakala	Pan-STARRS 1	H	400 m	MPC · JPL
865509	2015 HQ_{210}	—	April 24, 2015	Haleakala	Pan-STARRS 1	·	2.0 km	MPC · JPL
865510	2015 HU_{211}	—	April 25, 2015	Haleakala	Pan-STARRS 1	·	1.3 km	MPC · JPL
865511	2015 HN_{212}	—	April 25, 2015	Haleakala	Pan-STARRS 1	DOR	1.6 km	MPC · JPL
865512	2015 HT_{212}	—	April 20, 2015	Haleakala	Pan-STARRS 1	DOR	1.5 km	MPC · JPL
865513	2015 HH_{216}	—	April 23, 2015	Haleakala	Pan-STARRS 2	·	970 m	MPC · JPL
865514	2015 HT_{217}	—	April 25, 2015	Haleakala	Pan-STARRS 1	·	1.0 km	MPC · JPL
865515	2015 HV_{219}	—	October 23, 2008	Mount Lemmon	Mount Lemmon Survey	·	880 m	MPC · JPL
865516	2015 HO_{222}	—	April 18, 2015	Haleakala	Pan-STARRS 1	·	2.6 km	MPC · JPL
865517	2015 HG_{223}	—	April 16, 2015	Mount Lemmon	Mount Lemmon Survey	AGN	870 m	MPC · JPL
865518	2015 HW_{224}	—	April 23, 2015	Haleakala	Pan-STARRS 1	·	1.3 km	MPC · JPL
865519	2015 HZ_{224}	—	April 23, 2015	Haleakala	Pan-STARRS 1	·	1.1 km	MPC · JPL
865520	2015 HJ_{225}	—	April 25, 2015	Haleakala	Pan-STARRS 1	·	960 m	MPC · JPL
865521	2015 HP_{225}	—	April 25, 2015	Haleakala	Pan-STARRS 1	MRX	720 m	MPC · JPL
865522	2015 HL_{226}	—	April 18, 2015	Haleakala	Pan-STARRS 1	·	450 m	MPC · JPL
865523	2015 HR_{226}	—	April 18, 2015	Haleakala	Pan-STARRS 1	·	1.4 km	MPC · JPL
865524	2015 HB_{227}	—	April 24, 2015	Haleakala	Pan-STARRS 1	·	1.9 km	MPC · JPL
865525	2015 HO_{227}	—	April 25, 2015	Haleakala	Pan-STARRS 1	·	750 m	MPC · JPL
865526	2015 HU_{229}	—	April 18, 2015	Cerro Tololo	DECam	·	1.8 km	MPC · JPL
865527	2015 HB_{233}	—	April 25, 2015	Haleakala	Pan-STARRS 1	·	1.3 km	MPC · JPL
865528	2015 HF_{233}	—	April 18, 2015	Cerro Tololo	DECam	·	1 km	MPC · JPL
865529	2015 HS_{234}	—	April 18, 2015	Cerro Tololo	DECam	·	460 m	MPC · JPL
865530	2015 HD_{236}	—	April 21, 2015	Cerro Tololo	DECam	·	2.0 km	MPC · JPL
865531	2015 HV_{249}	—	April 18, 2015	Cerro Tololo	DECam	·	1.2 km	MPC · JPL
865532	2015 HC_{252}	—	April 25, 2015	Haleakala	Pan-STARRS 1	·	730 m	MPC · JPL
865533	2015 HZ_{253}	—	April 18, 2015	Haleakala	Pan-STARRS 1	·	430 m	MPC · JPL
865534	2015 HU_{255}	—	March 10, 2008	Mount Lemmon	Mount Lemmon Survey	·	440 m	MPC · JPL
865535	2015 HV_{255}	—	April 18, 2015	Cerro Tololo	DECam	L4	5.7 km	MPC · JPL
865536	2015 HK_{259}	—	April 18, 2015	Cerro Tololo	DECam	V	340 m	MPC · JPL
865537	2015 HS_{259}	—	April 24, 2015	Haleakala	Pan-STARRS 1	·	530 m	MPC · JPL
865538	2015 HQ_{267}	—	April 18, 2015	Cerro Tololo	DECam	·	2.7 km	MPC · JPL
865539	2015 HJ_{268}	—	May 13, 2011	Mount Lemmon	Mount Lemmon Survey	·	1.2 km	MPC · JPL
865540	2015 HH_{285}	—	April 18, 2015	Cerro Tololo	DECam	·	2.3 km	MPC · JPL
865541	2015 HV_{288}	—	February 26, 2009	Kitt Peak	Spacewatch	EOS	1.4 km	MPC · JPL
865542	2015 HV_{291}	—	April 18, 2015	Cerro Tololo	DECam	·	1.3 km	MPC · JPL
865543	2015 HW_{299}	—	April 18, 2015	Cerro Tololo	DECam	EOS	1.2 km	MPC · JPL
865544	2015 HR_{306}	—	April 23, 2015	Haleakala	Pan-STARRS 1	·	1.2 km	MPC · JPL
865545	2015 HF_{324}	—	April 18, 2015	Cerro Tololo	DECam	·	1.1 km	MPC · JPL
865546	2015 HP_{415}	—	April 19, 2015	Cerro Tololo	DECam	L4	5.7 km	MPC · JPL
865547	2015 HW_{446}	—	August 28, 2016	Mount Lemmon	Mount Lemmon Survey	·	1.0 km	MPC · JPL
865548	2015 JW_{1}	—	October 26, 2012	Mount Lemmon	Mount Lemmon Survey	·	850 m	MPC · JPL
865549	2015 JX_{1}	—	August 29, 2006	Catalina	CSS	·	850 m	MPC · JPL
865550	2015 JC_{3}	—	May 13, 2015	Haleakala	Pan-STARRS 1	H	390 m	MPC · JPL
865551	2015 JO_{3}	—	January 27, 2011	Kitt Peak	Spacewatch	·	850 m	MPC · JPL
865552	2015 JB_{4}	—	March 22, 2015	Haleakala	Pan-STARRS 1	·	960 m	MPC · JPL
865553	2015 JR_{4}	—	March 18, 2010	Mount Lemmon	Mount Lemmon Survey	·	1.5 km	MPC · JPL
865554	2015 JD_{6}	—	May 15, 2015	Haleakala	Pan-STARRS 1	·	1.4 km	MPC · JPL
865555	2015 JF_{6}	—	August 16, 2009	Catalina	CSS	·	790 m	MPC · JPL
865556	2015 JL_{6}	—	September 21, 2012	Kitt Peak	Spacewatch	·	730 m	MPC · JPL
865557	2015 JZ_{7}	—	April 12, 2015	Haleakala	Pan-STARRS 1	EUN	820 m	MPC · JPL
865558	2015 JW_{8}	—	April 13, 2015	Haleakala	Pan-STARRS 1	·	2.3 km	MPC · JPL
865559	2015 JS_{10}	—	October 8, 2012	Mount Lemmon	Mount Lemmon Survey	·	650 m	MPC · JPL
865560	2015 JF_{15}	—	February 20, 2014	Mount Lemmon	Mount Lemmon Survey	·	2.2 km	MPC · JPL
865561	2015 JM_{15}	—	May 14, 2015	Haleakala	Pan-STARRS 1	·	1.1 km	MPC · JPL
865562	2015 JN_{19}	—	May 13, 2015	Mount Lemmon	Mount Lemmon Survey	NYS	890 m	MPC · JPL
865563	2015 JE_{21}	—	May 15, 2015	Haleakala	Pan-STARRS 1	ADE	1.3 km	MPC · JPL
865564	2015 JR_{22}	—	May 11, 2015	Mount Lemmon	Mount Lemmon Survey	·	930 m	MPC · JPL
865565	2015 JN_{24}	—	May 10, 2015	Mount Lemmon	Mount Lemmon Survey	·	1.3 km	MPC · JPL
865566	2015 JC_{26}	—	May 11, 2015	Mount Lemmon	Mount Lemmon Survey	·	930 m	MPC · JPL
865567	2015 JE_{26}	—	May 14, 2015	Haleakala	Pan-STARRS 1	H	370 m	MPC · JPL
865568	2015 JK_{26}	—	August 24, 2007	Kitt Peak	Spacewatch	·	1.2 km	MPC · JPL
865569	2015 JY_{27}	—	February 11, 2011	Mount Lemmon	Mount Lemmon Survey	·	640 m	MPC · JPL
865570	2015 JB_{28}	—	April 29, 2006	Kitt Peak	Spacewatch	·	1.3 km	MPC · JPL
865571	2015 JM_{28}	—	May 10, 2015	Mount Lemmon	Mount Lemmon Survey	GEF	990 m	MPC · JPL
865572	2015 JC_{29}	—	May 11, 2015	Cerro Paranal	Gaia Ground Based Optical Tracking	NEM	1.5 km	MPC · JPL
865573	2015 JT_{31}	—	May 11, 2015	Mount Lemmon	Mount Lemmon Survey	·	1.2 km	MPC · JPL
865574	2015 JT_{35}	—	May 14, 2015	Haleakala	Pan-STARRS 1	·	1.5 km	MPC · JPL
865575	2015 KN_{8}	—	May 13, 2015	Mount Lemmon	Mount Lemmon Survey	·	1.0 km	MPC · JPL
865576	2015 KW_{8}	—	March 6, 2008	Mount Lemmon	Mount Lemmon Survey	·	560 m	MPC · JPL
865577	2015 KS_{9}	—	March 24, 2015	Mount Lemmon	Mount Lemmon Survey	PHO	530 m	MPC · JPL
865578	2015 KV_{11}	—	November 4, 2012	Catalina	CSS	·	1.1 km	MPC · JPL
865579	2015 KA_{12}	—	April 30, 2015	Mount Lemmon	Mount Lemmon Survey	TIR	2.2 km	MPC · JPL
865580	2015 KZ_{14}	—	May 24, 2006	Kitt Peak	Spacewatch	·	1.5 km	MPC · JPL
865581	2015 KF_{21}	—	May 18, 2015	Haleakala	Pan-STARRS 2	·	630 m	MPC · JPL
865582	2015 KK_{23}	—	May 18, 2015	Haleakala	Pan-STARRS 1	·	530 m	MPC · JPL
865583	2015 KV_{25}	—	January 2, 2011	Mount Lemmon	Mount Lemmon Survey	NYS	770 m	MPC · JPL
865584	2015 KE_{26}	—	April 19, 2015	Mount Lemmon	Mount Lemmon Survey	·	1.2 km	MPC · JPL
865585	2015 KE_{27}	—	March 4, 2011	Mount Lemmon	Mount Lemmon Survey	·	690 m	MPC · JPL
865586	2015 KJ_{27}	—	September 14, 2007	Catalina	CSS	ADE	1.5 km	MPC · JPL
865587	2015 KT_{28}	—	April 18, 2015	Haleakala	Pan-STARRS 1	·	1.4 km	MPC · JPL
865588	2015 KT_{29}	—	September 18, 2006	Kitt Peak	Spacewatch	·	490 m	MPC · JPL
865589	2015 KS_{30}	—	October 11, 2012	Mount Lemmon	Mount Lemmon Survey	·	600 m	MPC · JPL
865590	2015 KY_{31}	—	May 24, 2011	Haleakala	Pan-STARRS 1	·	780 m	MPC · JPL
865591	2015 KJ_{33}	—	January 29, 2011	Mount Lemmon	Mount Lemmon Survey	·	430 m	MPC · JPL
865592	2015 KB_{37}	—	May 19, 2015	Haleakala	Pan-STARRS 1	·	500 m	MPC · JPL
865593	2015 KS_{40}	—	March 30, 2015	Haleakala	Pan-STARRS 1	·	1.2 km	MPC · JPL
865594	2015 KG_{45}	—	September 19, 2011	Haleakala	Pan-STARRS 1	·	1.7 km	MPC · JPL
865595	2015 KV_{46}	—	October 8, 2012	Haleakala	Pan-STARRS 1	NYS	850 m	MPC · JPL
865596	2015 KH_{49}	—	March 21, 2015	Haleakala	Pan-STARRS 1	NYS	700 m	MPC · JPL
865597	2015 KP_{52}	—	June 3, 2011	Mount Lemmon	Mount Lemmon Survey	·	670 m	MPC · JPL
865598	2015 KX_{52}	—	March 10, 2007	Mount Lemmon	Mount Lemmon Survey	·	840 m	MPC · JPL
865599	2015 KL_{53}	—	August 6, 2008	La Sagra	OAM	NYS	980 m	MPC · JPL
865600	2015 KO_{54}	—	August 7, 2008	Kitt Peak	Spacewatch	·	1.0 km	MPC · JPL

== 865601–865700 ==
back to top

Designation			Discovery			Properties		Ref
Permanent	Provisional	Named after	Date	Site	Discoverer(s)	Category	Diam.	Ref
865601	2015 KW_{54}	—	October 6, 2012	Haleakala	Pan-STARRS 1	·	710 m	MPC · JPL
865602	2015 KT_{61}	—	October 1, 2000	Sacramento Peak	SDSS	·	2.0 km	MPC · JPL
865603	2015 KW_{61}	—	May 21, 2015	Haleakala	Pan-STARRS 1	·	2.0 km	MPC · JPL
865604	2015 KS_{63}	—	October 21, 2012	Mount Lemmon	Mount Lemmon Survey	·	2.2 km	MPC · JPL
865605	2015 KH_{66}	—	May 21, 2015	Haleakala	Pan-STARRS 1	·	580 m	MPC · JPL
865606	2015 KT_{66}	—	May 21, 2015	Haleakala	Pan-STARRS 1	·	1.1 km	MPC · JPL
865607	2015 KT_{67}	—	February 10, 2011	Mount Lemmon	Mount Lemmon Survey	·	890 m	MPC · JPL
865608	2015 KF_{68}	—	May 21, 2015	Haleakala	Pan-STARRS 1	·	1.2 km	MPC · JPL
865609	2015 KD_{75}	—	April 25, 2015	Haleakala	Pan-STARRS 1	·	970 m	MPC · JPL
865610	2015 KO_{75}	—	May 21, 2015	Haleakala	Pan-STARRS 1	3:2	3.2 km	MPC · JPL
865611	2015 KA_{77}	—	October 26, 2011	Haleakala	Pan-STARRS 1	TIR	2.3 km	MPC · JPL
865612	2015 KP_{89}	—	January 25, 2014	Haleakala	Pan-STARRS 1	·	1.2 km	MPC · JPL
865613	2015 KH_{90}	—	May 21, 2015	Haleakala	Pan-STARRS 1	WIT	620 m	MPC · JPL
865614	2015 KX_{90}	—	October 26, 2011	Haleakala	Pan-STARRS 1	·	2.1 km	MPC · JPL
865615	2015 KV_{92}	—	May 21, 2015	Haleakala	Pan-STARRS 1	·	1.2 km	MPC · JPL
865616	2015 KD_{98}	—	May 21, 2015	Haleakala	Pan-STARRS 1	·	570 m	MPC · JPL
865617	2015 KG_{99}	—	May 21, 2015	Haleakala	Pan-STARRS 1	·	910 m	MPC · JPL
865618	2015 KX_{102}	—	May 21, 2015	Haleakala	Pan-STARRS 1	·	2.4 km	MPC · JPL
865619	2015 KZ_{102}	—	May 21, 2015	Haleakala	Pan-STARRS 1	·	2.1 km	MPC · JPL
865620	2015 KQ_{103}	—	May 21, 2015	Haleakala	Pan-STARRS 1	·	1.2 km	MPC · JPL
865621	2015 KT_{103}	—	February 25, 2011	Mount Lemmon	Mount Lemmon Survey	·	450 m	MPC · JPL
865622	2015 KS_{107}	—	March 31, 2015	Haleakala	Pan-STARRS 1	·	890 m	MPC · JPL
865623	2015 KC_{108}	—	May 21, 2015	Haleakala	Pan-STARRS 1	·	1.3 km	MPC · JPL
865624	2015 KG_{109}	—	May 21, 2015	Haleakala	Pan-STARRS 1	EOS	1.3 km	MPC · JPL
865625	2015 KK_{115}	—	October 5, 2002	Sacramento Peak	SDSS	·	1.3 km	MPC · JPL
865626	2015 KY_{129}	—	May 18, 2015	Mount Lemmon	Mount Lemmon Survey	·	1.3 km	MPC · JPL
865627	2015 KG_{131}	—	May 22, 2015	Haleakala	Pan-STARRS 1	·	440 m	MPC · JPL
865628	2015 KD_{134}	—	August 29, 2011	Siding Spring	SSS	JUN	780 m	MPC · JPL
865629	2015 KS_{136}	—	April 25, 2015	Haleakala	Pan-STARRS 1	DOR	1.7 km	MPC · JPL
865630	2015 KB_{141}	—	October 25, 2005	Kitt Peak	Spacewatch	·	650 m	MPC · JPL
865631	2015 KE_{141}	—	October 4, 2012	Mount Lemmon	Mount Lemmon Survey	MAS	460 m	MPC · JPL
865632	2015 KV_{141}	—	May 13, 2015	Mount Lemmon	Mount Lemmon Survey	·	950 m	MPC · JPL
865633	2015 KB_{142}	—	March 22, 2015	Haleakala	Pan-STARRS 1	·	1.4 km	MPC · JPL
865634	2015 KH_{143}	—	May 24, 2015	Haleakala	Pan-STARRS 1	AEO	790 m	MPC · JPL
865635	2015 KX_{143}	—	October 8, 2012	Haleakala	Pan-STARRS 1	·	1.0 km	MPC · JPL
865636	2015 KM_{144}	—	May 24, 2015	Haleakala	Pan-STARRS 1	·	410 m	MPC · JPL
865637	2015 KA_{145}	—	October 14, 2012	Kitt Peak	Spacewatch	·	990 m	MPC · JPL
865638	2015 KB_{145}	—	October 3, 2005	Catalina	CSS	·	760 m	MPC · JPL
865639	2015 KQ_{145}	—	February 25, 2011	Mount Lemmon	Mount Lemmon Survey	MAS	510 m	MPC · JPL
865640	2015 KG_{148}	—	May 24, 2015	Haleakala	Pan-STARRS 1	·	450 m	MPC · JPL
865641	2015 KK_{148}	—	September 25, 2011	Haleakala	Pan-STARRS 1	·	1.3 km	MPC · JPL
865642	2015 KM_{149}	—	November 30, 2008	Mount Lemmon	Mount Lemmon Survey	H	390 m	MPC · JPL
865643	2015 KW_{151}	—	May 11, 2015	Mount Lemmon	Mount Lemmon Survey	·	530 m	MPC · JPL
865644	2015 KW_{152}	—	May 25, 2015	Haleakala	Pan-STARRS 1	·	1.2 km	MPC · JPL
865645	2015 KO_{154}	—	May 24, 2015	Mount Lemmon	Mount Lemmon Survey	H	300 m	MPC · JPL
865646	2015 KO_{159}	—	May 28, 2015	Mount Lemmon	Mount Lemmon Survey	·	1.4 km	MPC · JPL
865647	2015 KW_{163}	—	May 20, 2015	Mount Lemmon	Mount Lemmon Survey	H	330 m	MPC · JPL
865648	2015 KY_{163}	—	May 21, 2015	Haleakala	Pan-STARRS 1	H	340 m	MPC · JPL
865649	2015 KH_{164}	—	May 20, 2015	Haleakala	Pan-STARRS 1	H	320 m	MPC · JPL
865650	2015 KD_{170}	—	April 12, 2011	Mount Lemmon	Mount Lemmon Survey	·	930 m	MPC · JPL
865651	2015 KE_{179}	—	May 22, 2015	Haleakala	Pan-STARRS 1	·	850 m	MPC · JPL
865652	2015 KR_{179}	—	May 23, 2015	Mount Lemmon	Mount Lemmon Survey	TIN	720 m	MPC · JPL
865653	2015 KS_{182}	—	May 20, 2015	Haleakala	Pan-STARRS 1	H	340 m	MPC · JPL
865654	2015 KG_{184}	—	May 21, 2015	Haleakala	Pan-STARRS 1	·	810 m	MPC · JPL
865655	2015 KB_{188}	—	May 25, 2015	Haleakala	Pan-STARRS 1	H	330 m	MPC · JPL
865656	2015 KT_{188}	—	May 26, 2015	Haleakala	Pan-STARRS 2	H	550 m	MPC · JPL
865657	2015 KY_{188}	—	May 22, 2015	Haleakala	Pan-STARRS 1	·	1.0 km	MPC · JPL
865658	2015 KA_{189}	—	May 21, 2015	Haleakala	Pan-STARRS 1	·	690 m	MPC · JPL
865659	2015 KE_{189}	—	May 26, 2015	Haleakala	Pan-STARRS 1	H	290 m	MPC · JPL
865660	2015 KM_{190}	—	May 24, 2015	Haleakala	Pan-STARRS 1	·	2.2 km	MPC · JPL
865661	2015 KX_{190}	—	May 22, 2015	Haleakala	Pan-STARRS 1	·	1.1 km	MPC · JPL
865662	2015 KA_{191}	—	May 21, 2015	Haleakala	Pan-STARRS 1	·	1.2 km	MPC · JPL
865663	2015 KD_{191}	—	May 22, 2015	Mount Lemmon	Mount Lemmon Survey	·	1.2 km	MPC · JPL
865664	2015 KR_{191}	—	May 20, 2015	Mount Lemmon	Mount Lemmon Survey	·	1.2 km	MPC · JPL
865665	2015 KQ_{192}	—	May 22, 2015	Haleakala	Pan-STARRS 1	NYS	610 m	MPC · JPL
865666	2015 KT_{193}	—	May 21, 2015	Haleakala	Pan-STARRS 1	·	1.1 km	MPC · JPL
865667	2015 KT_{194}	—	May 21, 2015	Haleakala	Pan-STARRS 1	·	940 m	MPC · JPL
865668	2015 KC_{197}	—	August 12, 2007	Siding Spring	SSS	·	1.2 km	MPC · JPL
865669	2015 KG_{199}	—	May 18, 2015	Haleakala	Pan-STARRS 2	·	630 m	MPC · JPL
865670	2015 KF_{200}	—	May 21, 2015	Haleakala	Pan-STARRS 1	·	810 m	MPC · JPL
865671	2015 KQ_{201}	—	May 26, 2015	Haleakala	Pan-STARRS 1	H	390 m	MPC · JPL
865672	2015 KM_{203}	—	May 21, 2015	Haleakala	Pan-STARRS 1	·	500 m	MPC · JPL
865673	2015 KN_{204}	—	May 20, 2015	Mount Lemmon	Mount Lemmon Survey	·	650 m	MPC · JPL
865674	2015 KX_{204}	—	May 22, 2015	Haleakala	Pan-STARRS 1	·	510 m	MPC · JPL
865675	2015 KE_{206}	—	May 18, 2015	Haleakala	Pan-STARRS 1	·	870 m	MPC · JPL
865676	2015 KE_{207}	—	May 21, 2015	Haleakala	Pan-STARRS 1	·	1.2 km	MPC · JPL
865677	2015 KS_{207}	—	May 21, 2015	Cerro Paranal	Gaia Ground Based Optical Tracking	HOF	1.9 km	MPC · JPL
865678	2015 KE_{208}	—	May 25, 2015	Haleakala	Pan-STARRS 1	·	410 m	MPC · JPL
865679	2015 KD_{210}	—	September 6, 2016	Mount Lemmon	Mount Lemmon Survey	·	1.2 km	MPC · JPL
865680	2015 KP_{210}	—	May 21, 2015	Cerro Tololo	DECam	·	490 m	MPC · JPL
865681	2015 KR_{211}	—	May 11, 2015	Mount Lemmon	Mount Lemmon Survey	·	850 m	MPC · JPL
865682	2015 KH_{214}	—	May 25, 2015	Haleakala	Pan-STARRS 1	·	430 m	MPC · JPL
865683	2015 KC_{215}	—	May 20, 2015	Haleakala	Pan-STARRS 1	·	1.4 km	MPC · JPL
865684	2015 KK_{217}	—	November 20, 2012	Mount Lemmon	Mount Lemmon Survey	·	1.2 km	MPC · JPL
865685	2015 KL_{217}	—	April 25, 2015	Haleakala	Pan-STARRS 1	·	1.2 km	MPC · JPL
865686	2015 KO_{217}	—	May 21, 2015	Cerro Tololo	DECam	·	1.0 km	MPC · JPL
865687	2015 KC_{218}	—	September 28, 2008	Mount Lemmon	Mount Lemmon Survey	·	890 m	MPC · JPL
865688	2015 KV_{218}	—	August 8, 2016	Haleakala	Pan-STARRS 1	·	1.8 km	MPC · JPL
865689	2015 KB_{220}	—	July 5, 2016	Mount Lemmon	Mount Lemmon Survey	3:2	4.2 km	MPC · JPL
865690	2015 KT_{227}	—	May 20, 2015	Cerro Tololo	DECam	·	1.1 km	MPC · JPL
865691	2015 KX_{227}	—	August 3, 2016	Haleakala	Pan-STARRS 1	·	1.1 km	MPC · JPL
865692	2015 KC_{252}	—	November 6, 2016	Mount Lemmon	Mount Lemmon Survey	·	710 m	MPC · JPL
865693	2015 KM_{267}	—	May 22, 2015	Haleakala	Pan-STARRS 1	·	540 m	MPC · JPL
865694	2015 KV_{267}	—	May 20, 2015	Cerro Tololo	DECam	·	1.2 km	MPC · JPL
865695	2015 KC_{268}	—	May 24, 2015	Haleakala	Pan-STARRS 1	·	2.1 km	MPC · JPL
865696	2015 KM_{294}	—	November 8, 2009	Mount Lemmon	Mount Lemmon Survey	·	580 m	MPC · JPL
865697	2015 KB_{306}	—	October 22, 2012	Haleakala	Pan-STARRS 1	·	1.1 km	MPC · JPL
865698	2015 KR_{311}	—	May 20, 2015	Cerro Tololo	DECam	·	920 m	MPC · JPL
865699	2015 KP_{317}	—	September 30, 2006	Kitt Peak	Spacewatch	·	400 m	MPC · JPL
865700	2015 KX_{318}	—	May 20, 2015	Cerro Tololo	DECam	·	920 m	MPC · JPL

== 865701–865800 ==
back to top

Designation			Discovery			Properties		Ref
Permanent	Provisional	Named after	Date	Site	Discoverer(s)	Category	Diam.	Ref
865701	2015 KA_{320}	—	August 8, 2016	Haleakala	Pan-STARRS 1	·	1.1 km	MPC · JPL
865702	2015 KM_{321}	—	May 19, 2015	Cerro Tololo	DECam	ELF	2.2 km	MPC · JPL
865703	2015 KB_{323}	—	May 20, 2015	Cerro Tololo	DECam	·	1.8 km	MPC · JPL
865704	2015 KW_{323}	—	May 21, 2015	Cerro Tololo	DECam	·	440 m	MPC · JPL
865705	2015 KP_{357}	—	September 25, 2009	Kitt Peak	Spacewatch	3:2	3.8 km	MPC · JPL
865706	2015 KR_{358}	—	May 20, 2015	Cerro Tololo	DECam	·	930 m	MPC · JPL
865707	2015 KJ_{360}	—	May 24, 2015	Cerro Tololo	DECam	H	370 m	MPC · JPL
865708	2015 KL_{360}	—	February 7, 2006	Kitt Peak	Spacewatch	·	800 m	MPC · JPL
865709	2015 KW_{366}	—	May 21, 2015	Haleakala	Pan-STARRS 1	·	1.1 km	MPC · JPL
865710	2015 KK_{368}	—	November 12, 2006	Mount Lemmon	Mount Lemmon Survey	·	2.1 km	MPC · JPL
865711	2015 KG_{371}	—	May 20, 2015	Cerro Tololo	DECam	·	1.2 km	MPC · JPL
865712	2015 LA_{1}	—	March 29, 2015	Haleakala	Pan-STARRS 1	·	1.4 km	MPC · JPL
865713	2015 LM_{1}	—	April 14, 2015	Mount Lemmon	Mount Lemmon Survey	·	870 m	MPC · JPL
865714	2015 LG_{3}	—	April 24, 2015	Haleakala	Pan-STARRS 1	·	1.7 km	MPC · JPL
865715	2015 LH_{4}	—	May 15, 2015	Haleakala	Pan-STARRS 1	·	1.4 km	MPC · JPL
865716	2015 LL_{4}	—	March 22, 2015	Haleakala	Pan-STARRS 1	·	1.2 km	MPC · JPL
865717	2015 LH_{5}	—	October 15, 2012	Haleakala	Pan-STARRS 1	EUN	980 m	MPC · JPL
865718	2015 LH_{6}	—	June 7, 2015	Haleakala	Pan-STARRS 1	·	1.6 km	MPC · JPL
865719	2015 LY_{14}	—	September 15, 2012	Catalina	CSS	·	450 m	MPC · JPL
865720	2015 LM_{23}	—	May 21, 2015	Haleakala	Pan-STARRS 1	·	1.4 km	MPC · JPL
865721	2015 LS_{23}	—	June 12, 2015	Mount Lemmon	Mount Lemmon Survey	·	1.8 km	MPC · JPL
865722	2015 LB_{24}	—	September 3, 2000	Socorro	LINEAR	·	1.0 km	MPC · JPL
865723	2015 LP_{25}	—	March 21, 2015	Haleakala	Pan-STARRS 1	·	940 m	MPC · JPL
865724	2015 LB_{26}	—	June 13, 2015	Haleakala	Pan-STARRS 1	AEO	860 m	MPC · JPL
865725	2015 LT_{26}	—	October 20, 2012	Mount Lemmon	Mount Lemmon Survey	·	820 m	MPC · JPL
865726	2015 LL_{27}	—	October 9, 2005	Kitt Peak	Spacewatch	·	2.3 km	MPC · JPL
865727	2015 LN_{27}	—	June 10, 2015	Haleakala	Pan-STARRS 1	·	1.0 km	MPC · JPL
865728	2015 LV_{27}	—	June 13, 2015	Haleakala	Pan-STARRS 1	·	1.2 km	MPC · JPL
865729	2015 LS_{29}	—	June 13, 2015	Haleakala	Pan-STARRS 1	·	1.3 km	MPC · JPL
865730	2015 LB_{30}	—	June 8, 2011	Mount Lemmon	Mount Lemmon Survey	·	860 m	MPC · JPL
865731	2015 LL_{30}	—	October 24, 2011	Haleakala	Pan-STARRS 1	DOR	1.6 km	MPC · JPL
865732	2015 LQ_{30}	—	September 9, 2008	Kitt Peak	Spacewatch	ERI	1.1 km	MPC · JPL
865733	2015 LM_{31}	—	June 13, 2015	Haleakala	Pan-STARRS 1	·	530 m	MPC · JPL
865734	2015 LW_{31}	—	June 13, 2015	Haleakala	Pan-STARRS 1	·	1.0 km	MPC · JPL
865735	2015 LZ_{31}	—	June 13, 2015	Haleakala	Pan-STARRS 1	·	440 m	MPC · JPL
865736	2015 LE_{33}	—	September 28, 2008	Mount Lemmon	Mount Lemmon Survey	·	780 m	MPC · JPL
865737	2015 LL_{37}	—	May 22, 2015	Haleakala	Pan-STARRS 1	·	910 m	MPC · JPL
865738	2015 LC_{38}	—	May 21, 2015	Haleakala	Pan-STARRS 1	·	2.2 km	MPC · JPL
865739	2015 LE_{39}	—	June 15, 2015	Mount Lemmon	Mount Lemmon Survey	·	630 m	MPC · JPL
865740	2015 LY_{39}	—	June 15, 2015	Mount Lemmon	Mount Lemmon Survey	·	1.2 km	MPC · JPL
865741	2015 LD_{41}	—	June 27, 2015	Haleakala	Pan-STARRS 1	·	2.1 km	MPC · JPL
865742	2015 LO_{47}	—	June 6, 2015	Haleakala	Pan-STARRS 1	TIN	900 m	MPC · JPL
865743	2015 LA_{48}	—	June 12, 2015	Haleakala	Pan-STARRS 1	·	1.1 km	MPC · JPL
865744	2015 LP_{49}	—	June 11, 2015	Haleakala	Pan-STARRS 1	·	850 m	MPC · JPL
865745	2015 LS_{50}	—	June 11, 2015	Haleakala	Pan-STARRS 1	NYS	720 m	MPC · JPL
865746	2015 LO_{52}	—	June 14, 2015	Mount Lemmon	Mount Lemmon Survey	·	1.2 km	MPC · JPL
865747	2015 LR_{52}	—	June 12, 2015	Mount Lemmon	Mount Lemmon Survey	·	1.3 km	MPC · JPL
865748	2015 LC_{53}	—	June 12, 2015	Mount Lemmon	Mount Lemmon Survey	·	530 m	MPC · JPL
865749	2015 LM_{55}	—	June 12, 2015	Haleakala	Pan-STARRS 1	(5)	1.0 km	MPC · JPL
865750	2015 LF_{56}	—	June 11, 2015	Haleakala	Pan-STARRS 1	·	1.4 km	MPC · JPL
865751	2015 LH_{56}	—	June 15, 2015	Haleakala	Pan-STARRS 1	·	1.2 km	MPC · JPL
865752	2015 LP_{63}	—	August 18, 2011	Haleakala	Pan-STARRS 1	MAR	870 m	MPC · JPL
865753	2015 MZ_{4}	—	June 16, 2015	Haleakala	Pan-STARRS 1	·	420 m	MPC · JPL
865754	2015 MB_{7}	—	June 13, 2015	Mount Lemmon	Mount Lemmon Survey	·	1.7 km	MPC · JPL
865755	2015 MO_{7}	—	September 19, 2011	Haleakala	Pan-STARRS 1	·	1.2 km	MPC · JPL
865756	2015 MG_{13}	—	August 26, 2012	Haleakala	Pan-STARRS 1	·	420 m	MPC · JPL
865757	2015 ME_{14}	—	May 22, 2015	Haleakala	Pan-STARRS 1	·	510 m	MPC · JPL
865758	2015 MW_{17}	—	March 22, 2015	Haleakala	Pan-STARRS 1	·	1.2 km	MPC · JPL
865759	2015 MP_{19}	—	May 15, 2015	Haleakala	Pan-STARRS 1	EUN	1.1 km	MPC · JPL
865760	2015 MF_{21}	—	November 1, 2005	Catalina	CSS	H	370 m	MPC · JPL
865761	2015 MW_{21}	—	January 9, 2014	Haleakala	Pan-STARRS 1	T_{j} (2.88)	3.8 km	MPC · JPL
865762	2015 MQ_{24}	—	May 18, 2015	Haleakala	Pan-STARRS 2	·	1.3 km	MPC · JPL
865763	2015 MY_{25}	—	April 18, 2015	Haleakala	Pan-STARRS 1	(2076)	470 m	MPC · JPL
865764	2015 MK_{26}	—	June 18, 2015	Haleakala	Pan-STARRS 1	·	570 m	MPC · JPL
865765	2015 MQ_{26}	—	May 12, 2015	Mount Lemmon	Mount Lemmon Survey	·	1.6 km	MPC · JPL
865766	2015 ME_{28}	—	May 15, 2015	Haleakala	Pan-STARRS 1	(895)	2.6 km	MPC · JPL
865767	2015 MK_{29}	—	August 18, 2011	Haleakala	Pan-STARRS 1	·	1.1 km	MPC · JPL
865768	2015 MU_{29}	—	June 18, 2015	Haleakala	Pan-STARRS 1	·	1.5 km	MPC · JPL
865769	2015 MY_{30}	—	October 20, 2012	Haleakala	Pan-STARRS 1	·	1.0 km	MPC · JPL
865770	2015 MT_{34}	—	May 21, 2015	Haleakala	Pan-STARRS 1	GEF	720 m	MPC · JPL
865771	2015 MP_{38}	—	June 18, 2015	Haleakala	Pan-STARRS 1	JUN	810 m	MPC · JPL
865772	2015 MQ_{44}	—	October 20, 2011	Mount Lemmon	Mount Lemmon Survey	MRX	870 m	MPC · JPL
865773	2015 MY_{44}	—	June 17, 2015	Haleakala	Pan-STARRS 1	·	1.3 km	MPC · JPL
865774	2015 MB_{45}	—	October 30, 2008	Kitt Peak	Spacewatch	·	990 m	MPC · JPL
865775	2015 ME_{45}	—	May 9, 2011	Mount Lemmon	Mount Lemmon Survey	·	760 m	MPC · JPL
865776	2015 MK_{46}	—	June 17, 2015	Haleakala	Pan-STARRS 1	·	480 m	MPC · JPL
865777	2015 MO_{50}	—	June 17, 2015	Haleakala	Pan-STARRS 1	·	3.1 km	MPC · JPL
865778	2015 MA_{52}	—	June 18, 2015	Haleakala	Pan-STARRS 1	·	420 m	MPC · JPL
865779	2015 MW_{52}	—	May 24, 2015	Haleakala	Pan-STARRS 1	·	490 m	MPC · JPL
865780	2015 MK_{56}	—	September 8, 2004	Sacramento Peak	SDSS Collaboration	·	790 m	MPC · JPL
865781	2015 MU_{56}	—	June 13, 2015	Haleakala	Pan-STARRS 1	JUN	650 m	MPC · JPL
865782	2015 MC_{60}	—	December 4, 2013	Haleakala	Pan-STARRS 1	H	430 m	MPC · JPL
865783	2015 MZ_{60}	—	September 28, 2008	Mount Lemmon	Mount Lemmon Survey	·	920 m	MPC · JPL
865784	2015 MJ_{61}	—	February 5, 2011	Haleakala	Pan-STARRS 1	·	470 m	MPC · JPL
865785	2015 MU_{61}	—	June 20, 2015	Haleakala	Pan-STARRS 1	EUN	930 m	MPC · JPL
865786	2015 MC_{66}	—	June 12, 2015	Mount Lemmon	Mount Lemmon Survey	·	460 m	MPC · JPL
865787	2015 MB_{72}	—	April 24, 2011	Mount Lemmon	Mount Lemmon Survey	·	710 m	MPC · JPL
865788	2015 MM_{73}	—	June 18, 2015	Haleakala	Pan-STARRS 1	V	480 m	MPC · JPL
865789	2015 MX_{73}	—	June 22, 2015	Haleakala	Pan-STARRS 1	·	570 m	MPC · JPL
865790	2015 MV_{76}	—	June 13, 2015	Mount Lemmon	Mount Lemmon Survey	·	1.1 km	MPC · JPL
865791	2015 MC_{79}	—	May 13, 2005	Kitt Peak	Spacewatch	·	470 m	MPC · JPL
865792	2015 MF_{79}	—	December 3, 2007	Kitt Peak	Spacewatch	·	1.6 km	MPC · JPL
865793	2015 MF_{80}	—	August 24, 2012	Kitt Peak	Spacewatch	·	400 m	MPC · JPL
865794	2015 MD_{81}	—	June 22, 2015	Haleakala	Pan-STARRS 1	NYS	670 m	MPC · JPL
865795	2015 MV_{82}	—	October 22, 2012	Haleakala	Pan-STARRS 1	RAF	750 m	MPC · JPL
865796	2015 MN_{84}	—	June 22, 2015	Haleakala	Pan-STARRS 1	·	510 m	MPC · JPL
865797	2015 MP_{91}	—	November 13, 2010	Kitt Peak	Spacewatch	·	1.6 km	MPC · JPL
865798	2015 MY_{92}	—	August 13, 2012	Siding Spring	SSS	·	520 m	MPC · JPL
865799	2015 MD_{95}	—	August 8, 2004	Socorro	LINEAR	·	690 m	MPC · JPL
865800	2015 MB_{96}	—	September 4, 2011	Haleakala	Pan-STARRS 1	·	1.3 km	MPC · JPL

== 865801–865900 ==
back to top

Designation			Discovery			Properties		Ref
Permanent	Provisional	Named after	Date	Site	Discoverer(s)	Category	Diam.	Ref
865801	2015 MS_{97}	—	June 23, 2015	Haleakala	Pan-STARRS 1	·	1.0 km	MPC · JPL
865802	2015 MP_{99}	—	June 3, 2008	Mount Lemmon	Mount Lemmon Survey	·	500 m	MPC · JPL
865803	2015 MS_{99}	—	June 23, 2015	Haleakala	Pan-STARRS 1	HNS	770 m	MPC · JPL
865804	2015 MN_{100}	—	October 28, 2008	Kitt Peak	Spacewatch	NYS	820 m	MPC · JPL
865805	2015 MU_{101}	—	June 25, 2015	Haleakala	Pan-STARRS 1	·	1.0 km	MPC · JPL
865806	2015 MA_{106}	—	October 15, 2004	Kitt Peak	Spacewatch	·	930 m	MPC · JPL
865807	2015 MT_{108}	—	October 15, 2012	Haleakala	Pan-STARRS 1	·	450 m	MPC · JPL
865808	2015 MB_{110}	—	June 26, 2015	Haleakala	Pan-STARRS 1	·	880 m	MPC · JPL
865809	2015 MK_{110}	—	June 26, 2015	Haleakala	Pan-STARRS 1	·	820 m	MPC · JPL
865810	2015 MU_{110}	—	September 7, 2008	Mount Lemmon	Mount Lemmon Survey	MAS	610 m	MPC · JPL
865811	2015 MB_{113}	—	June 26, 2015	Haleakala	Pan-STARRS 1	BRA	1.0 km	MPC · JPL
865812	2015 MR_{118}	—	October 16, 2012	Mount Lemmon	Mount Lemmon Survey	·	400 m	MPC · JPL
865813	2015 MT_{118}	—	July 1, 2011	Mount Lemmon	Mount Lemmon Survey	·	950 m	MPC · JPL
865814	2015 ME_{119}	—	September 28, 2006	Catalina	CSS	·	1.4 km	MPC · JPL
865815	2015 MT_{119}	—	June 27, 2015	Haleakala	Pan-STARRS 1	·	1.5 km	MPC · JPL
865816	2015 MZ_{124}	—	June 28, 2015	Haleakala	Pan-STARRS 1	·	2.8 km	MPC · JPL
865817	2015 MH_{126}	—	January 1, 2014	Haleakala	Pan-STARRS 1	H	380 m	MPC · JPL
865818	2015 MC_{127}	—	June 29, 2015	Haleakala	Pan-STARRS 1	·	900 m	MPC · JPL
865819	2015 MV_{127}	—	October 7, 2012	Haleakala	Pan-STARRS 1	·	460 m	MPC · JPL
865820	2015 MR_{129}	—	June 29, 2015	Haleakala	Pan-STARRS 1	MAS	460 m	MPC · JPL
865821	2015 MV_{129}	—	June 27, 2015	Haleakala	Pan-STARRS 2	·	450 m	MPC · JPL
865822	2015 MK_{132}	—	June 17, 2015	Haleakala	Pan-STARRS 1	NAE	1.5 km	MPC · JPL
865823	2015 MY_{132}	—	April 10, 2010	Kitt Peak	Spacewatch	·	1.3 km	MPC · JPL
865824	2015 MB_{133}	—	June 20, 2015	Haleakala	Pan-STARRS 1	·	1.5 km	MPC · JPL
865825	2015 MD_{133}	—	September 7, 2004	Kitt Peak	Spacewatch	·	1.9 km	MPC · JPL
865826	2015 MU_{135}	—	September 26, 2006	Mount Lemmon	Mount Lemmon Survey	KOR	850 m	MPC · JPL
865827	2015 MW_{135}	—	June 27, 2015	Haleakala	Pan-STARRS 1	·	1.3 km	MPC · JPL
865828	2015 MB_{138}	—	June 26, 2015	Haleakala	Pan-STARRS 1	·	1.5 km	MPC · JPL
865829	2015 MB_{144}	—	October 3, 2011	Mount Lemmon	Mount Lemmon Survey	AGN	870 m	MPC · JPL
865830	2015 MX_{145}	—	June 26, 2015	Haleakala	Pan-STARRS 1	·	1.3 km	MPC · JPL
865831	2015 MN_{146}	—	June 26, 2015	Haleakala	Pan-STARRS 1	·	1.4 km	MPC · JPL
865832	2015 MN_{148}	—	September 17, 2006	Kitt Peak	Spacewatch	·	1.5 km	MPC · JPL
865833	2015 MQ_{148}	—	June 27, 2015	Haleakala	Pan-STARRS 1	AGN	880 m	MPC · JPL
865834	2015 MA_{151}	—	June 27, 2015	Haleakala	Pan-STARRS 1	·	420 m	MPC · JPL
865835	2015 MK_{151}	—	June 19, 2015	Haleakala	Pan-STARRS 1	PHO	910 m	MPC · JPL
865836	2015 MP_{151}	—	June 20, 2015	Haleakala	Pan-STARRS 1	·	1.3 km	MPC · JPL
865837	2015 MZ_{152}	—	June 25, 2015	Haleakala	Pan-STARRS 1	·	930 m	MPC · JPL
865838	2015 MG_{153}	—	June 29, 2015	Haleakala	Pan-STARRS 1	·	430 m	MPC · JPL
865839	2015 MK_{154}	—	June 17, 2015	Haleakala	Pan-STARRS 1	·	790 m	MPC · JPL
865840	2015 MU_{154}	—	June 26, 2015	Haleakala	Pan-STARRS 1	PHO	630 m	MPC · JPL
865841	2015 MR_{157}	—	June 22, 2015	Haleakala	Pan-STARRS 1	·	730 m	MPC · JPL
865842	2015 MA_{159}	—	June 27, 2015	Haleakala	Pan-STARRS 1	·	640 m	MPC · JPL
865843	2015 MR_{159}	—	June 22, 2015	Haleakala	Pan-STARRS 1	·	880 m	MPC · JPL
865844	2015 MJ_{160}	—	June 24, 2015	Haleakala	Pan-STARRS 1	·	1.3 km	MPC · JPL
865845	2015 MW_{162}	—	June 26, 2015	Haleakala	Pan-STARRS 1	·	1.3 km	MPC · JPL
865846	2015 MH_{163}	—	June 23, 2015	Haleakala	Pan-STARRS 1	·	530 m	MPC · JPL
865847	2015 MA_{164}	—	June 20, 2015	Haleakala	Pan-STARRS 1	·	1.1 km	MPC · JPL
865848	2015 MB_{164}	—	June 26, 2015	Haleakala	Pan-STARRS 1	·	420 m	MPC · JPL
865849	2015 MO_{167}	—	June 18, 2015	Mount Lemmon	Mount Lemmon Survey	·	1.3 km	MPC · JPL
865850	2015 MZ_{167}	—	June 23, 2015	Haleakala	Pan-STARRS 1	·	1.2 km	MPC · JPL
865851	2015 MC_{168}	—	June 18, 2015	Haleakala	Pan-STARRS 1	GEF	820 m	MPC · JPL
865852	2015 MD_{168}	—	June 26, 2015	Haleakala	Pan-STARRS 1	KOR	920 m	MPC · JPL
865853	2015 MG_{168}	—	June 26, 2015	Haleakala	Pan-STARRS 1	HOF	1.7 km	MPC · JPL
865854	2015 MV_{168}	—	May 22, 2015	Haleakala	Pan-STARRS 1	·	1.5 km	MPC · JPL
865855	2015 MY_{168}	—	June 29, 2015	Haleakala	Pan-STARRS 1	EOS	1.3 km	MPC · JPL
865856	2015 MC_{169}	—	June 17, 2015	Haleakala	Pan-STARRS 1	·	1.4 km	MPC · JPL
865857	2015 ME_{169}	—	June 19, 2015	Haleakala	Pan-STARRS 1	BRA	1.1 km	MPC · JPL
865858	2015 MO_{170}	—	June 26, 2015	Haleakala	Pan-STARRS 1	KOR	960 m	MPC · JPL
865859	2015 MV_{170}	—	June 17, 2015	Haleakala	Pan-STARRS 1	·	1.5 km	MPC · JPL
865860	2015 MP_{171}	—	June 26, 2015	Haleakala	Pan-STARRS 1	GEF	740 m	MPC · JPL
865861	2015 MR_{171}	—	June 22, 2015	Haleakala	Pan-STARRS 1	EUN	850 m	MPC · JPL
865862	2015 MS_{172}	—	June 17, 2015	Haleakala	Pan-STARRS 1	·	1.3 km	MPC · JPL
865863	2015 MC_{173}	—	June 18, 2015	Haleakala	Pan-STARRS 1	·	1.4 km	MPC · JPL
865864	2015 MG_{174}	—	June 26, 2015	Haleakala	Pan-STARRS 1	·	1.2 km	MPC · JPL
865865	2015 MS_{174}	—	June 23, 2015	Haleakala	Pan-STARRS 1	·	1.2 km	MPC · JPL
865866	2015 MW_{174}	—	June 27, 2015	Haleakala	Pan-STARRS 1	DOR	1.4 km	MPC · JPL
865867	2015 MM_{176}	—	June 18, 2015	Haleakala	Pan-STARRS 1	·	920 m	MPC · JPL
865868	2015 MQ_{176}	—	June 17, 2015	Haleakala	Pan-STARRS 1	·	1.2 km	MPC · JPL
865869	2015 MT_{179}	—	June 26, 2015	Haleakala	Pan-STARRS 1	·	1.5 km	MPC · JPL
865870	2015 MM_{180}	—	June 18, 2015	Haleakala	Pan-STARRS 1	EUN	810 m	MPC · JPL
865871	2015 MU_{180}	—	June 16, 2015	Mount Lemmon	Mount Lemmon Survey	·	410 m	MPC · JPL
865872	2015 MB_{181}	—	June 27, 2015	Haleakala	Pan-STARRS 1	·	2.2 km	MPC · JPL
865873	2015 MC_{181}	—	June 22, 2015	Haleakala	Pan-STARRS 1	·	1.5 km	MPC · JPL
865874	2015 MW_{181}	—	June 17, 2015	Haleakala	Pan-STARRS 1	·	1.3 km	MPC · JPL
865875	2015 MG_{182}	—	June 18, 2015	Haleakala	Pan-STARRS 1	·	490 m	MPC · JPL
865876	2015 MA_{183}	—	June 27, 2015	Haleakala	Pan-STARRS 1	VER	1.7 km	MPC · JPL
865877	2015 MH_{183}	—	June 17, 2015	Haleakala	Pan-STARRS 1	·	2.0 km	MPC · JPL
865878	2015 MG_{185}	—	June 17, 2015	Haleakala	Pan-STARRS 1	·	490 m	MPC · JPL
865879	2015 MJ_{191}	—	June 26, 2015	Haleakala	Pan-STARRS 1	H	300 m	MPC · JPL
865880	2015 MY_{191}	—	June 29, 2015	Haleakala	Pan-STARRS 1	·	440 m	MPC · JPL
865881	2015 MO_{192}	—	June 22, 2015	Haleakala	Pan-STARRS 1	H	350 m	MPC · JPL
865882	2015 MD_{200}	—	June 18, 2015	Haleakala	Pan-STARRS 1	·	450 m	MPC · JPL
865883	2015 MT_{205}	—	June 26, 2015	Haleakala	Pan-STARRS 1	AGN	750 m	MPC · JPL
865884	2015 MH_{207}	—	June 23, 2015	Haleakala	Pan-STARRS 1	V	450 m	MPC · JPL
865885	2015 MB_{213}	—	June 26, 2015	Haleakala	Pan-STARRS 1	·	1.2 km	MPC · JPL
865886	2015 NG	—	October 25, 2011	Haleakala	Pan-STARRS 1	·	1.1 km	MPC · JPL
865887	2015 NO	—	January 24, 2014	Haleakala	Pan-STARRS 1	·	1.4 km	MPC · JPL
865888	2015 NR_{1}	—	May 25, 2015	Haleakala	Pan-STARRS 1	·	1.4 km	MPC · JPL
865889	2015 NS_{1}	—	March 26, 2006	Mount Lemmon	Mount Lemmon Survey	EUN	820 m	MPC · JPL
865890	2015 NZ_{2}	—	July 7, 2015	Mount Lemmon	Mount Lemmon Survey	H	330 m	MPC · JPL
865891	2015 NF_{4}	—	June 7, 2015	Haleakala	Pan-STARRS 1	H	400 m	MPC · JPL
865892	2015 NB_{5}	—	June 18, 2015	Haleakala	Pan-STARRS 1	·	570 m	MPC · JPL
865893	2015 NE_{7}	—	August 28, 2006	Catalina	CSS	·	1.2 km	MPC · JPL
865894	2015 NX_{9}	—	August 27, 2011	Piszkéstető	K. Sárneczky	·	1.1 km	MPC · JPL
865895	2015 NA_{10}	—	September 18, 2011	Haleakala	Pan-STARRS 1	·	260 m	MPC · JPL
865896	2015 NW_{10}	—	August 23, 2011	Haleakala	Pan-STARRS 1	·	1.3 km	MPC · JPL
865897	2015 NJ_{11}	—	May 21, 2015	Haleakala	Pan-STARRS 1	·	1.2 km	MPC · JPL
865898	2015 NS_{14}	—	June 7, 2015	Mount Lemmon	Mount Lemmon Survey	·	2.2 km	MPC · JPL
865899	2015 NE_{15}	—	September 17, 2010	Socorro	LINEAR	·	2.2 km	MPC · JPL
865900	2015 NO_{22}	—	June 15, 2015	Mount Lemmon	Mount Lemmon Survey	·	870 m	MPC · JPL

== 865901–866000 ==
back to top

Designation			Discovery			Properties		Ref
Permanent	Provisional	Named after	Date	Site	Discoverer(s)	Category	Diam.	Ref
865901	2015 NY_{23}	—	June 13, 2015	Mount Lemmon	Mount Lemmon Survey	·	1.5 km	MPC · JPL
865902	2015 NP_{26}	—	September 24, 2011	Haleakala	Pan-STARRS 1	·	1.4 km	MPC · JPL
865903	2015 NS_{26}	—	September 4, 2011	Haleakala	Pan-STARRS 1	EUN	830 m	MPC · JPL
865904	2015 NF_{28}	—	August 29, 2006	Kitt Peak	Spacewatch	MRX	800 m	MPC · JPL
865905	2015 NO_{32}	—	July 9, 2015	Haleakala	Pan-STARRS 1	·	1.4 km	MPC · JPL
865906	2015 NQ_{32}	—	July 14, 2015	Haleakala	Pan-STARRS 1	·	1.5 km	MPC · JPL
865907	2015 NZ_{32}	—	July 9, 2015	Haleakala	Pan-STARRS 1	·	1.2 km	MPC · JPL
865908	2015 NG_{33}	—	July 12, 2015	Haleakala	Pan-STARRS 1	KOR	1.1 km	MPC · JPL
865909	2015 NH_{33}	—	July 12, 2015	Haleakala	Pan-STARRS 1	·	1.7 km	MPC · JPL
865910	2015 NS_{34}	—	July 12, 2015	Haleakala	Pan-STARRS 1	·	930 m	MPC · JPL
865911	2015 NE_{35}	—	July 12, 2015	Haleakala	Pan-STARRS 1	·	460 m	MPC · JPL
865912	2015 NR_{35}	—	July 9, 2015	Haleakala	Pan-STARRS 1	DOR	1.5 km	MPC · JPL
865913	2015 NZ_{35}	—	July 12, 2015	Haleakala	Pan-STARRS 1	·	420 m	MPC · JPL
865914	2015 ND_{38}	—	July 9, 2015	Haleakala	Pan-STARRS 1	·	1.3 km	MPC · JPL
865915	2015 NU_{41}	—	July 12, 2015	Haleakala	Pan-STARRS 1	·	810 m	MPC · JPL
865916	2015 NA_{45}	—	July 15, 2015	Mauna Kea	COIAS	·	610 m	MPC · JPL
865917	2015 NE_{45}	—	July 15, 2015	Mauna Kea	COIAS	·	790 m	MPC · JPL
865918	2015 OW	—	July 16, 2015	Mount Teide	Observatorio del Teide	V	430 m	MPC · JPL
865919	2015 OQ_{3}	—	February 28, 2014	Haleakala	Pan-STARRS 1	·	1.3 km	MPC · JPL
865920	2015 OO_{4}	—	December 3, 2005	Kitt Peak	Spacewatch	TIR	2.1 km	MPC · JPL
865921	2015 OB_{5}	—	June 28, 2015	Haleakala	Pan-STARRS 1	·	1.1 km	MPC · JPL
865922	2015 OP_{7}	—	October 23, 2011	Mount Lemmon	Mount Lemmon Survey	·	1.6 km	MPC · JPL
865923	2015 OF_{8}	—	May 6, 2010	Mount Lemmon	Mount Lemmon Survey	·	1.3 km	MPC · JPL
865924	2015 OU_{9}	—	June 29, 2015	Haleakala	Pan-STARRS 1	·	470 m	MPC · JPL
865925	2015 OV_{11}	—	July 18, 2015	Haleakala	Pan-STARRS 1	·	2.0 km	MPC · JPL
865926	2015 OG_{12}	—	July 18, 2015	Haleakala	Pan-STARRS 1	·	1.3 km	MPC · JPL
865927	2015 OF_{17}	—	April 2, 2011	Kitt Peak	Spacewatch	·	590 m	MPC · JPL
865928	2015 OH_{20}	—	July 18, 2015	Haleakala	Pan-STARRS 1	H	290 m	MPC · JPL
865929	2015 ON_{24}	—	June 22, 2015	Mount Lemmon	Mount Lemmon Survey	·	880 m	MPC · JPL
865930	2015 OM_{27}	—	February 11, 2008	Mount Lemmon	Mount Lemmon Survey	·	1.3 km	MPC · JPL
865931	2015 OT_{27}	—	September 27, 2000	Kitt Peak	Spacewatch	·	810 m	MPC · JPL
865932	2015 OM_{28}	—	July 23, 2015	Haleakala	Pan-STARRS 1	·	1.6 km	MPC · JPL
865933	2015 OC_{29}	—	September 7, 2011	Kitt Peak	Spacewatch	·	910 m	MPC · JPL
865934	2015 OG_{30}	—	July 29, 2008	Kitt Peak	Spacewatch	·	460 m	MPC · JPL
865935	2015 OA_{37}	—	October 30, 2008	Kitt Peak	Spacewatch	·	820 m	MPC · JPL
865936	2015 OR_{38}	—	July 23, 2015	Haleakala	Pan-STARRS 1	PHO	710 m	MPC · JPL
865937	2015 OF_{43}	—	June 20, 2015	Haleakala	Pan-STARRS 1	·	970 m	MPC · JPL
865938	2015 OM_{45}	—	November 21, 2009	Kitt Peak	Spacewatch	·	470 m	MPC · JPL
865939	2015 OS_{45}	—	September 24, 2011	Haleakala	Pan-STARRS 1	·	1.3 km	MPC · JPL
865940	2015 OA_{48}	—	June 17, 2015	Haleakala	Pan-STARRS 1	·	880 m	MPC · JPL
865941	2015 OT_{52}	—	October 8, 2012	Kitt Peak	Spacewatch	·	390 m	MPC · JPL
865942	2015 OS_{57}	—	June 17, 2015	Haleakala	Pan-STARRS 1	BRA	1.2 km	MPC · JPL
865943	2015 OR_{64}	—	July 19, 2015	Haleakala	Pan-STARRS 1	·	1.3 km	MPC · JPL
865944	2015 OL_{65}	—	September 15, 2006	Kitt Peak	Spacewatch	·	1.4 km	MPC · JPL
865945	2015 OA_{66}	—	July 26, 2015	Haleakala	Pan-STARRS 1	·	990 m	MPC · JPL
865946	2015 OR_{67}	—	June 18, 2015	Haleakala	Pan-STARRS 1	·	360 m	MPC · JPL
865947	2015 OE_{68}	—	June 26, 2015	Haleakala	Pan-STARRS 1	·	960 m	MPC · JPL
865948	2015 OV_{70}	—	July 27, 2015	Haleakala	Pan-STARRS 1	AEO	780 m	MPC · JPL
865949	2015 OD_{72}	—	September 17, 2010	Mount Lemmon	Mount Lemmon Survey	·	1.6 km	MPC · JPL
865950	2015 OH_{72}	—	June 13, 2015	Mount Lemmon	Mount Lemmon Survey	·	1.5 km	MPC · JPL
865951	2015 OJ_{72}	—	October 23, 2011	Haleakala	Pan-STARRS 1	·	1.4 km	MPC · JPL
865952	2015 ON_{72}	—	June 17, 2015	Haleakala	Pan-STARRS 1	·	420 m	MPC · JPL
865953	2015 OT_{72}	—	December 5, 2008	Kitt Peak	Spacewatch	V	540 m	MPC · JPL
865954	2015 OZ_{74}	—	July 18, 2015	Haleakala	Pan-STARRS 1	·	790 m	MPC · JPL
865955	2015 OV_{75}	—	July 29, 2015	Haleakala	Pan-STARRS 1	·	1.3 km	MPC · JPL
865956	2015 OU_{80}	—	January 5, 2014	Haleakala	Pan-STARRS 1	H	380 m	MPC · JPL
865957	2015 OP_{81}	—	July 18, 2015	Haleakala	Pan-STARRS 1	·	610 m	MPC · JPL
865958	2015 OM_{83}	—	July 25, 2015	Haleakala	Pan-STARRS 1	·	1.6 km	MPC · JPL
865959	2015 OA_{88}	—	October 25, 2011	Haleakala	Pan-STARRS 1	·	1.2 km	MPC · JPL
865960	2015 OR_{92}	—	July 19, 2015	Haleakala	Pan-STARRS 2	·	1.3 km	MPC · JPL
865961	2015 OG_{93}	—	October 7, 2004	Kitt Peak	Spacewatch	THB	2.2 km	MPC · JPL
865962	2015 OB_{94}	—	July 23, 2015	Haleakala	Pan-STARRS 1	·	1.1 km	MPC · JPL
865963	2015 OU_{94}	—	May 8, 2014	Haleakala	Pan-STARRS 1	KOR	1.1 km	MPC · JPL
865964	2015 OK_{95}	—	September 21, 2011	Kitt Peak	Spacewatch	·	1.1 km	MPC · JPL
865965	2015 OS_{97}	—	July 24, 2015	Haleakala	Pan-STARRS 1	·	1.1 km	MPC · JPL
865966	2015 OZ_{97}	—	March 4, 2012	Mount Lemmon	Mount Lemmon Survey	·	2.2 km	MPC · JPL
865967	2015 OK_{98}	—	July 24, 2015	Haleakala	Pan-STARRS 1	KOR	1.0 km	MPC · JPL
865968	2015 OM_{100}	—	July 25, 2015	Haleakala	Pan-STARRS 1	EOS	1.3 km	MPC · JPL
865969	2015 OB_{101}	—	July 25, 2015	Haleakala	Pan-STARRS 1	·	510 m	MPC · JPL
865970	2015 OJ_{103}	—	April 5, 2014	Haleakala	Pan-STARRS 1	AGN	830 m	MPC · JPL
865971	2015 OP_{103}	—	September 17, 2006	Kitt Peak	Spacewatch	AGN	860 m	MPC · JPL
865972	2015 OT_{103}	—	July 26, 2015	Haleakala	Pan-STARRS 1	·	1.7 km	MPC · JPL
865973	2015 OE_{107}	—	July 25, 2015	Haleakala	Pan-STARRS 1	·	1.9 km	MPC · JPL
865974	2015 OP_{107}	—	July 24, 2015	Haleakala	Pan-STARRS 1	·	1.5 km	MPC · JPL
865975	2015 OL_{108}	—	July 23, 2015	Haleakala	Pan-STARRS 1	·	500 m	MPC · JPL
865976	2015 OO_{108}	—	July 25, 2015	Haleakala	Pan-STARRS 1	·	1.1 km	MPC · JPL
865977	2015 OQ_{108}	—	July 23, 2015	Haleakala	Pan-STARRS 1	·	710 m	MPC · JPL
865978	2015 OO_{109}	—	July 23, 2015	Haleakala	Pan-STARRS 2	·	900 m	MPC · JPL
865979	2015 OJ_{110}	—	July 25, 2015	Haleakala	Pan-STARRS 1	·	1.5 km	MPC · JPL
865980	2015 ON_{112}	—	July 26, 2015	Haleakala	Pan-STARRS 1	PHO	670 m	MPC · JPL
865981	2015 OA_{113}	—	July 24, 2015	Haleakala	Pan-STARRS 1	·	730 m	MPC · JPL
865982	2015 OO_{113}	—	January 8, 2019	Haleakala	Pan-STARRS 1	H	420 m	MPC · JPL
865983	2015 OZ_{114}	—	July 26, 2015	Haleakala	Pan-STARRS 1	·	680 m	MPC · JPL
865984	2015 OT_{115}	—	July 25, 2015	Haleakala	Pan-STARRS 1	·	700 m	MPC · JPL
865985	2015 OE_{117}	—	July 25, 2015	Haleakala	Pan-STARRS 1	·	1.3 km	MPC · JPL
865986	2015 OS_{117}	—	July 28, 2015	Haleakala	Pan-STARRS 1	·	440 m	MPC · JPL
865987	2015 OC_{118}	—	July 25, 2015	Haleakala	Pan-STARRS 1	·	930 m	MPC · JPL
865988	2015 OJ_{119}	—	July 19, 2015	Haleakala	Pan-STARRS 1	EUN	810 m	MPC · JPL
865989	2015 OL_{120}	—	July 24, 2015	Haleakala	Pan-STARRS 1	·	420 m	MPC · JPL
865990	2015 OD_{124}	—	July 25, 2015	Haleakala	Pan-STARRS 1	V	360 m	MPC · JPL
865991	2015 OG_{124}	—	July 25, 2015	Haleakala	Pan-STARRS 1	·	1.4 km	MPC · JPL
865992	2015 OP_{125}	—	July 26, 2015	Haleakala	Pan-STARRS 1	H	370 m	MPC · JPL
865993	2015 OJ_{127}	—	July 25, 2015	Haleakala	Pan-STARRS 1	·	2.4 km	MPC · JPL
865994	2015 OJ_{128}	—	July 25, 2015	Haleakala	Pan-STARRS 1	EOS	1.1 km	MPC · JPL
865995	2015 OH_{129}	—	July 25, 2015	Haleakala	Pan-STARRS 1	·	1.5 km	MPC · JPL
865996	2015 OG_{130}	—	July 19, 2015	Haleakala	Pan-STARRS 1	·	860 m	MPC · JPL
865997	2015 OJ_{130}	—	July 25, 2015	Haleakala	Pan-STARRS 1	·	390 m	MPC · JPL
865998	2015 OO_{131}	—	July 28, 2015	Haleakala	Pan-STARRS 1	·	2.6 km	MPC · JPL
865999	2015 OV_{131}	—	July 24, 2015	Haleakala	Pan-STARRS 1	·	1.4 km	MPC · JPL
866000	2015 OS_{132}	—	July 25, 2015	Haleakala	Pan-STARRS 1	EOS	1.3 km	MPC · JPL

== Meaning of names ==
As minor planet discoveries are confirmed, they are given a permanent number by the IAU's Minor Planet Center (MPC), and the discoverers can then submit names for them, following the IAU's naming conventions. The list below concerns those minor planets in the specified number-range that have received names, and explains the meanings of those names.

Official naming citations of newly named small Solar System bodies are approved and published in a bulletin by IAU's Working Group for Small Bodies Nomenclature (WGSBN). Before May 2021, citations were published in MPC's Minor Planet Circulars for many decades. Recent citations can also be found on the JPL Small-Body Database (SBDB). Until his death in 2016, German astronomer Lutz D. Schmadel compiled these citations into the Dictionary of Minor Planet Names (DMP) and regularly updated the collection.

Based on Paul Herget's The Names of the Minor Planets, Schmadel also researched the unclear origin of numerous asteroids, most of which had been named prior to World War II. This article incorporates text from this source, which is in the public domain: SBDB New namings may only be added to this list below after official publication as the preannouncement of names is condemned. The WGSBN publishes a comprehensive guideline for the naming rules of non-cometary small Solar System bodies.

Named minor planet	Provisional	This minor planet was named for...	Ref · Catalog
865364 Daianji	2015 FX_{488}	Okayama Daianji Secondary School was the first secondary school in Okayama, Japan. Its name derives from the area having been an estate of the Daianji temple in Nara, inheriting its traditions of scholarship.	IAU · 865364

back to top
