= List of minor planets: 893001–894000 =

The following is a partial list of minor planets, running from minor-planet number 893001 through 894000, inclusive. The primary data for this and other partial lists is based on JPL's "Small-Body Orbital Elements" and data available from the Minor Planet Center. Critical list information is also provided by the MPC, unless otherwise specified from Lowell Observatory. A detailed description of the table's columns and additional sources are given on the main page including a complete list of every page in this series, and a statistical break-up on the dynamical classification of minor planets.

Also see the summary list of all named bodies in numerical and alphabetical order, and the corresponding naming citations for the number range of this particular list. New namings may only be added to this list after official publication, as the preannouncement of names is condemned by the Working Group for Small Bodies Nomenclature of the International Astronomical Union.

Near-Earth obj.	MBA (inner)	MBA (outer)	Centaur
Mars-crosser	MBA (middle)	Jupiter trojan	Trans-Neptunian obj.
Unclassified

== 893001–893100 ==
Designation			Discovery			Properties		Ref
Permanent	Provisional	Named after	Date	Site	Discoverer(s)	Category	Diam.	Ref
893001	2016 AH_{351}	—	January 7, 2016	Haleakala	Pan-STARRS 1	·	450 m	MPC · JPL
893002	2016 AN_{357}	—	January 4, 2016	Haleakala	Pan-STARRS 1	·	450 m	MPC · JPL
893003	2016 AD_{358}	—	January 8, 2016	Haleakala	Pan-STARRS 1	T_{j} (2.99) · 3:2	3.9 km	MPC · JPL
893004	2016 AB_{359}	—	February 3, 2009	Mount Lemmon	Mount Lemmon Survey	PHO	540 m	MPC · JPL
893005	2016 AX_{373}	—	January 12, 2016	Haleakala	Pan-STARRS 1	H	300 m	MPC · JPL
893006	2016 AY_{373}	—	January 12, 2016	Haleakala	Pan-STARRS 1	L5	6.2 km	MPC · JPL
893007	2016 AW_{379}	—	January 2, 2016	Kitt Peak	Spacewatch	·	500 m	MPC · JPL
893008	2016 AZ_{382}	—	January 2, 2016	Mount Lemmon	Mount Lemmon Survey	EOS	1.3 km	MPC · JPL
893009	2016 AU_{392}	—	January 4, 2016	Haleakala	Pan-STARRS 1	·	2.1 km	MPC · JPL
893010	2016 AU_{398}	—	January 4, 2016	Haleakala	Pan-STARRS 1	·	1.5 km	MPC · JPL
893011	2016 AB_{399}	—	November 22, 2014	Haleakala	Pan-STARRS 1	·	1.2 km	MPC · JPL
893012	2016 AN_{408}	—	January 14, 2016	Haleakala	Pan-STARRS 1	·	1.2 km	MPC · JPL
893013	2016 AD_{410}	—	January 4, 2016	Haleakala	Pan-STARRS 1	·	380 m	MPC · JPL
893014	2016 AE_{410}	—	January 7, 2016	Haleakala	Pan-STARRS 1	·	1.3 km	MPC · JPL
893015	2016 BM_{6}	—	January 3, 2009	Mount Lemmon	Mount Lemmon Survey	·	540 m	MPC · JPL
893016	2016 BE_{7}	—	December 13, 2015	Haleakala	Pan-STARRS 1	·	520 m	MPC · JPL
893017	2016 BZ_{8}	—	February 10, 2011	Mount Lemmon	Mount Lemmon Survey	H	290 m	MPC · JPL
893018	2016 BL_{15}	—	November 22, 2015	Mount Lemmon	Mount Lemmon Survey	H	400 m	MPC · JPL
893019	2016 BC_{39}	—	January 10, 2016	Haleakala	Pan-STARRS 1	H	310 m	MPC · JPL
893020	2016 BN_{56}	—	January 3, 2016	Haleakala	Pan-STARRS 1	·	930 m	MPC · JPL
893021	2016 BP_{63}	—	January 15, 2016	Haleakala	Pan-STARRS 1	·	690 m	MPC · JPL
893022	2016 BM_{69}	—	February 2, 2006	Kitt Peak	Spacewatch	·	1.2 km	MPC · JPL
893023	2016 BV_{73}	—	January 14, 2016	Haleakala	Pan-STARRS 1	·	980 m	MPC · JPL
893024	2016 BV_{77}	—	January 31, 2016	Haleakala	Pan-STARRS 1	·	720 m	MPC · JPL
893025	2016 BX_{82}	—	January 16, 2016	Haleakala	Pan-STARRS 1	H	290 m	MPC · JPL
893026	2016 BC_{83}	—	January 16, 2016	Haleakala	Pan-STARRS 1	H	280 m	MPC · JPL
893027	2016 BF_{83}	—	January 18, 2016	Mount Lemmon	Mount Lemmon Survey	H	310 m	MPC · JPL
893028	2016 BJ_{85}	—	January 17, 2016	Haleakala	Pan-STARRS 1	·	1.6 km	MPC · JPL
893029	2016 BW_{106}	—	January 18, 2016	Haleakala	Pan-STARRS 1	·	490 m	MPC · JPL
893030	2016 BN_{108}	—	January 18, 2016	Haleakala	Pan-STARRS 1	·	800 m	MPC · JPL
893031	2016 BK_{109}	—	January 3, 2009	Mount Lemmon	Mount Lemmon Survey	·	440 m	MPC · JPL
893032	2016 BN_{109}	—	January 17, 2016	Haleakala	Pan-STARRS 1	·	540 m	MPC · JPL
893033	2016 BZ_{109}	—	January 29, 2016	Haleakala	Pan-STARRS 1	·	2.1 km	MPC · JPL
893034	2016 BO_{110}	—	January 21, 2016	Mount Lemmon	Mount Lemmon Survey	·	440 m	MPC · JPL
893035	2016 BY_{114}	—	January 29, 2016	Haleakala	Pan-STARRS 1	PHO	680 m	MPC · JPL
893036	2016 BT_{124}	—	November 21, 2014	Mount Lemmon	Mount Lemmon Survey	·	1.3 km	MPC · JPL
893037	2016 BP_{127}	—	January 31, 2016	Haleakala	Pan-STARRS 1	L5	8.9 km	MPC · JPL
893038	2016 BO_{130}	—	January 16, 2016	Haleakala	Pan-STARRS 1	·	1.3 km	MPC · JPL
893039	2016 BE_{131}	—	January 18, 2016	Haleakala	Pan-STARRS 1	·	1.3 km	MPC · JPL
893040	2016 BZ_{131}	—	October 26, 2011	Haleakala	Pan-STARRS 1	·	490 m	MPC · JPL
893041	2016 BE_{132}	—	January 19, 2016	Haleakala	Pan-STARRS 1	·	1.8 km	MPC · JPL
893042	2016 BB_{146}	—	January 20, 2015	Haleakala	Pan-STARRS 1	·	2.0 km	MPC · JPL
893043	2016 CQ_{2}	—	February 25, 2011	Mount Lemmon	Mount Lemmon Survey	EOS	1.2 km	MPC · JPL
893044	2016 CS_{2}	—	January 4, 2016	Haleakala	Pan-STARRS 1	·	1.3 km	MPC · JPL
893045	2016 CN_{4}	—	February 1, 2016	Haleakala	Pan-STARRS 1	·	520 m	MPC · JPL
893046	2016 CN_{5}	—	September 4, 2014	Charleston	International Astronomical Search Collaboration	·	520 m	MPC · JPL
893047	2016 CP_{9}	—	December 21, 2008	Kitt Peak	Spacewatch	·	470 m	MPC · JPL
893048	2016 CN_{13}	—	March 19, 2013	Haleakala	Pan-STARRS 1	·	450 m	MPC · JPL
893049	2016 CQ_{38}	—	January 29, 2011	Mount Lemmon	Mount Lemmon Survey	·	1.1 km	MPC · JPL
893050	2016 CD_{43}	—	February 3, 2016	Haleakala	Pan-STARRS 1	·	1.4 km	MPC · JPL
893051	2016 CU_{59}	—	February 3, 2016	Haleakala	Pan-STARRS 1	BRA	1.2 km	MPC · JPL
893052	2016 CK_{64}	—	February 3, 2016	Haleakala	Pan-STARRS 1	·	470 m	MPC · JPL
893053	2016 CD_{68}	—	September 25, 2011	Haleakala	Pan-STARRS 1	·	430 m	MPC · JPL
893054	2016 CS_{73}	—	February 4, 2016	Haleakala	Pan-STARRS 1	·	1.4 km	MPC · JPL
893055	2016 CK_{80}	—	December 1, 2008	Kitt Peak	Spacewatch	·	410 m	MPC · JPL
893056	2016 CQ_{83}	—	August 14, 2013	Haleakala	Pan-STARRS 1	·	2.3 km	MPC · JPL
893057	2016 CN_{88}	—	February 5, 2016	Haleakala	Pan-STARRS 1	·	1.8 km	MPC · JPL
893058	2016 CX_{104}	—	February 5, 2016	Haleakala	Pan-STARRS 1	·	420 m	MPC · JPL
893059	2016 CH_{111}	—	February 5, 2016	Haleakala	Pan-STARRS 1	·	1.2 km	MPC · JPL
893060	2016 CN_{118}	—	January 14, 2016	Haleakala	Pan-STARRS 1	·	1.4 km	MPC · JPL
893061	2016 CL_{121}	—	January 14, 2016	Haleakala	Pan-STARRS 1	·	1.7 km	MPC · JPL
893062	2016 CA_{123}	—	April 14, 2012	Haleakala	Pan-STARRS 1	·	850 m	MPC · JPL
893063	2016 CC_{134}	—	January 31, 2016	Haleakala	Pan-STARRS 1	·	1.3 km	MPC · JPL
893064	2016 CR_{134}	—	February 5, 2016	Haleakala	Pan-STARRS 1	·	1.3 km	MPC · JPL
893065	2016 CL_{136}	—	February 8, 2016	Catalina	CSS	ATE · PHA	120 m	MPC · JPL
893066	2016 CN_{136}	—	February 5, 2016	Haleakala	Pan-STARRS 1	H	300 m	MPC · JPL
893067	2016 CH_{145}	—	October 21, 2011	Kitt Peak	Spacewatch	·	490 m	MPC · JPL
893068	2016 CF_{151}	—	January 7, 2016	Haleakala	Pan-STARRS 1	V	520 m	MPC · JPL
893069	2016 CX_{153}	—	January 19, 2012	Haleakala	Pan-STARRS 1	·	820 m	MPC · JPL
893070	2016 CH_{166}	—	November 2, 2007	Kitt Peak	Spacewatch	NYS	840 m	MPC · JPL
893071	2016 CK_{172}	—	January 7, 2016	Haleakala	Pan-STARRS 1	·	1.6 km	MPC · JPL
893072	2016 CN_{175}	—	December 13, 2015	Haleakala	Pan-STARRS 1	·	1.3 km	MPC · JPL
893073	2016 CV_{175}	—	January 19, 2016	Haleakala	Pan-STARRS 1	·	1.2 km	MPC · JPL
893074	2016 CK_{177}	—	November 21, 2014	Catalina	CSS	EUP	2.5 km	MPC · JPL
893075	2016 CQ_{179}	—	January 9, 2016	Haleakala	Pan-STARRS 1	·	1.5 km	MPC · JPL
893076	2016 CS_{188}	—	February 9, 2016	Haleakala	Pan-STARRS 1	·	1.3 km	MPC · JPL
893077	2016 CR_{195}	—	February 28, 2006	Catalina	CSS	·	630 m	MPC · JPL
893078	2016 CC_{206}	—	January 14, 2016	Haleakala	Pan-STARRS 1	·	420 m	MPC · JPL
893079	2016 CU_{207}	—	January 9, 2016	Haleakala	Pan-STARRS 1	·	390 m	MPC · JPL
893080	2016 CB_{208}	—	October 25, 2014	Mount Lemmon	Mount Lemmon Survey	·	1.6 km	MPC · JPL
893081	2016 CC_{209}	—	February 21, 2006	Mount Lemmon	Mount Lemmon Survey	·	500 m	MPC · JPL
893082	2016 CS_{215}	—	August 20, 2014	Haleakala	Pan-STARRS 1	·	470 m	MPC · JPL
893083	2016 CT_{217}	—	February 13, 2011	Mount Lemmon	Mount Lemmon Survey	H	250 m	MPC · JPL
893084	2016 CY_{220}	—	August 28, 2014	Haleakala	Pan-STARRS 1	·	570 m	MPC · JPL
893085	2016 CK_{224}	—	October 20, 2011	Mount Lemmon	Mount Lemmon Survey	·	430 m	MPC · JPL
893086	2016 CM_{231}	—	November 9, 2009	Kitt Peak	Spacewatch	·	1.5 km	MPC · JPL
893087	2016 CW_{233}	—	January 30, 2016	Haleakala	Pan-STARRS 1	·	1.7 km	MPC · JPL
893088	2016 CL_{238}	—	November 20, 2014	Haleakala	Pan-STARRS 1	EOS	1.2 km	MPC · JPL
893089	2016 CG_{248}	—	February 10, 2016	Haleakala	Pan-STARRS 1	H	260 m	MPC · JPL
893090	2016 CX_{263}	—	January 16, 2016	Haleakala	Pan-STARRS 1	·	470 m	MPC · JPL
893091	2016 CY_{266}	—	February 4, 2016	Mount Lemmon	Mount Lemmon Survey	H	260 m	MPC · JPL
893092	2016 CB_{267}	—	February 5, 2016	Haleakala	Pan-STARRS 1	H	260 m	MPC · JPL
893093	2016 CF_{267}	—	April 2, 2011	Mount Lemmon	Mount Lemmon Survey	H	290 m	MPC · JPL
893094	2016 CO_{267}	—	February 12, 2016	Haleakala	Pan-STARRS 1	H	280 m	MPC · JPL
893095	2016 CT_{267}	—	February 3, 2016	Mount Lemmon	Mount Lemmon Survey	H	410 m	MPC · JPL
893096	2016 CW_{267}	—	February 3, 2016	Haleakala	Pan-STARRS 1	H	310 m	MPC · JPL
893097	2016 CT_{268}	—	July 5, 2014	Haleakala	Pan-STARRS 1	H	270 m	MPC · JPL
893098	2016 CK_{269}	—	February 3, 2016	Haleakala	Pan-STARRS 1	·	1.4 km	MPC · JPL
893099	2016 CN_{274}	—	February 10, 2016	Haleakala	Pan-STARRS 1	·	1.3 km	MPC · JPL
893100	2016 CM_{275}	—	February 10, 2016	Haleakala	Pan-STARRS 1	·	2.4 km	MPC · JPL

== 893101–893200 ==
back to top

Designation			Discovery			Properties		Ref
Permanent	Provisional	Named after	Date	Site	Discoverer(s)	Category	Diam.	Ref
893101	2016 CO_{275}	—	February 10, 2016	Haleakala	Pan-STARRS 1	·	2.2 km	MPC · JPL
893102	2016 CR_{276}	—	February 11, 2016	Haleakala	Pan-STARRS 1	·	1.5 km	MPC · JPL
893103	2016 CB_{290}	—	February 9, 2016	Haleakala	Pan-STARRS 1	·	560 m	MPC · JPL
893104	2016 CR_{290}	—	August 27, 2014	Haleakala	Pan-STARRS 1	·	540 m	MPC · JPL
893105	2016 CA_{292}	—	December 10, 2009	Mount Lemmon	Mount Lemmon Survey	·	1.2 km	MPC · JPL
893106	2016 CW_{303}	—	March 13, 2011	Kitt Peak	Spacewatch	·	1.4 km	MPC · JPL
893107	2016 CQ_{308}	—	February 7, 2016	Mount Lemmon	Mount Lemmon Survey	·	770 m	MPC · JPL
893108	2016 CF_{316}	—	February 8, 2011	Mount Lemmon	Mount Lemmon Survey	KOR	870 m	MPC · JPL
893109	2016 CZ_{323}	—	February 10, 2016	Haleakala	Pan-STARRS 1	H	300 m	MPC · JPL
893110	2016 CO_{325}	—	February 9, 2016	Haleakala	Pan-STARRS 1	V	460 m	MPC · JPL
893111	2016 CH_{326}	—	February 10, 2016	Haleakala	Pan-STARRS 1	H	290 m	MPC · JPL
893112	2016 CJ_{330}	—	February 4, 2016	Haleakala	Pan-STARRS 1	·	450 m	MPC · JPL
893113	2016 CB_{331}	—	February 3, 2016	Haleakala	Pan-STARRS 1	·	1.1 km	MPC · JPL
893114	2016 CJ_{332}	—	February 5, 2016	Haleakala	Pan-STARRS 1	·	2.0 km	MPC · JPL
893115	2016 CS_{333}	—	February 11, 2016	Haleakala	Pan-STARRS 1	V	400 m	MPC · JPL
893116	2016 CZ_{333}	—	February 11, 2016	Mount Lemmon	Mount Lemmon Survey	·	1.2 km	MPC · JPL
893117	2016 CG_{334}	—	February 11, 2016	Haleakala	Pan-STARRS 1	·	1.9 km	MPC · JPL
893118	2016 CW_{336}	—	February 6, 2016	Haleakala	Pan-STARRS 1	·	480 m	MPC · JPL
893119	2016 CB_{338}	—	November 17, 2014	Haleakala	Pan-STARRS 1	·	1.1 km	MPC · JPL
893120	2016 CE_{338}	—	February 6, 2016	Haleakala	Pan-STARRS 1	·	760 m	MPC · JPL
893121	2016 CC_{345}	—	February 5, 2016	Haleakala	Pan-STARRS 1	·	1.2 km	MPC · JPL
893122	2016 CZ_{349}	—	February 5, 2016	Haleakala	Pan-STARRS 1	·	640 m	MPC · JPL
893123	2016 CX_{354}	—	February 11, 2016	Haleakala	Pan-STARRS 1	·	1.3 km	MPC · JPL
893124	2016 CK_{358}	—	February 5, 2016	Haleakala	Pan-STARRS 1	·	1.5 km	MPC · JPL
893125	2016 CX_{360}	—	February 3, 2016	Mount Lemmon	Mount Lemmon Survey	·	770 m	MPC · JPL
893126	2016 CL_{363}	—	February 5, 2016	Haleakala	Pan-STARRS 1	H	300 m	MPC · JPL
893127	2016 CC_{366}	—	February 11, 2016	Haleakala	Pan-STARRS 1	H	300 m	MPC · JPL
893128	2016 CJ_{366}	—	February 9, 2016	Mount Lemmon	Mount Lemmon Survey	H	310 m	MPC · JPL
893129	2016 CV_{366}	—	February 11, 2016	Haleakala	Pan-STARRS 1	·	830 m	MPC · JPL
893130	2016 CX_{366}	—	February 5, 2016	Haleakala	Pan-STARRS 1	·	590 m	MPC · JPL
893131	2016 CS_{368}	—	February 10, 2016	Haleakala	Pan-STARRS 1	·	1.6 km	MPC · JPL
893132	2016 CB_{369}	—	February 6, 2016	Haleakala	Pan-STARRS 1	·	1.7 km	MPC · JPL
893133	2016 CF_{369}	—	February 3, 2016	Haleakala	Pan-STARRS 1	·	1.5 km	MPC · JPL
893134	2016 CM_{370}	—	February 3, 2016	Haleakala	Pan-STARRS 1	·	1.3 km	MPC · JPL
893135	2016 CT_{370}	—	February 5, 2016	Haleakala	Pan-STARRS 1	H	320 m	MPC · JPL
893136	2016 CA_{371}	—	February 14, 2016	Haleakala	Pan-STARRS 1	H	260 m	MPC · JPL
893137	2016 CX_{371}	—	February 5, 2016	Haleakala	Pan-STARRS 1	·	1.3 km	MPC · JPL
893138	2016 CE_{372}	—	February 5, 2016	Haleakala	Pan-STARRS 1	·	1.5 km	MPC · JPL
893139	2016 CG_{372}	—	February 3, 2016	Haleakala	Pan-STARRS 1	H	290 m	MPC · JPL
893140	2016 CE_{374}	—	February 5, 2016	Haleakala	Pan-STARRS 1	·	1.3 km	MPC · JPL
893141	2016 CX_{375}	—	January 9, 2016	Haleakala	Pan-STARRS 1	·	1.1 km	MPC · JPL
893142	2016 CP_{377}	—	February 3, 2016	Haleakala	Pan-STARRS 1	·	500 m	MPC · JPL
893143	2016 CA_{380}	—	February 11, 2016	Haleakala	Pan-STARRS 1	·	2.0 km	MPC · JPL
893144	2016 CS_{382}	—	February 11, 2016	Haleakala	Pan-STARRS 1	EOS	1.3 km	MPC · JPL
893145	2016 CV_{384}	—	February 9, 2016	Haleakala	Pan-STARRS 1	·	1.6 km	MPC · JPL
893146	2016 CC_{386}	—	February 5, 2016	Haleakala	Pan-STARRS 1	·	1.7 km	MPC · JPL
893147	2016 CU_{392}	—	February 6, 2016	Haleakala	Pan-STARRS 1	·	1.8 km	MPC · JPL
893148	2016 CO_{397}	—	February 10, 2016	Haleakala	Pan-STARRS 1	·	1.1 km	MPC · JPL
893149	2016 CC_{399}	—	February 6, 2016	Haleakala	Pan-STARRS 1	·	1.6 km	MPC · JPL
893150	2016 CJ_{409}	—	February 5, 2016	Haleakala	Pan-STARRS 1	·	1.1 km	MPC · JPL
893151	2016 CX_{411}	—	February 10, 2016	Haleakala	Pan-STARRS 1	EOS	1.3 km	MPC · JPL
893152	2016 CZ_{428}	—	October 26, 2014	Mount Lemmon	Mount Lemmon Survey	·	1.4 km	MPC · JPL
893153	2016 CG_{439}	—	February 6, 2016	Haleakala	Pan-STARRS 1	·	1.8 km	MPC · JPL
893154	2016 CQ_{439}	—	February 15, 2016	Mount Lemmon	Mount Lemmon Survey	·	1.4 km	MPC · JPL
893155	2016 DW_{14}	—	January 8, 2011	Mount Lemmon	Mount Lemmon Survey	·	1.3 km	MPC · JPL
893156	2016 DP_{22}	—	April 8, 2003	Palomar	NEAT	·	440 m	MPC · JPL
893157	2016 DG_{25}	—	February 11, 2016	Haleakala	Pan-STARRS 1	·	370 m	MPC · JPL
893158	2016 DM_{25}	—	October 18, 2011	Mount Lemmon	Mount Lemmon Survey	·	440 m	MPC · JPL
893159	2016 DE_{27}	—	January 13, 2016	Haleakala	Pan-STARRS 1	·	520 m	MPC · JPL
893160	2016 DA_{30}	—	February 29, 2016	Haleakala	Pan-STARRS 1	·	540 m	MPC · JPL
893161	2016 DH_{31}	—	February 25, 2011	Mount Lemmon	Mount Lemmon Survey	H	320 m	MPC · JPL
893162	2016 DK_{31}	—	February 29, 2016	Haleakala	Pan-STARRS 1	H	300 m	MPC · JPL
893163	2016 DM_{32}	—	February 29, 2016	Haleakala	Pan-STARRS 1	·	1.9 km	MPC · JPL
893164	2016 DE_{34}	—	November 27, 2014	Haleakala	Pan-STARRS 1	·	1.6 km	MPC · JPL
893165	2016 DF_{36}	—	August 24, 2007	Kitt Peak	Spacewatch	·	450 m	MPC · JPL
893166	2016 DH_{36}	—	February 28, 2016	Mount Lemmon	Mount Lemmon Survey	H	320 m	MPC · JPL
893167	2016 DT_{37}	—	February 28, 2016	Mount Lemmon	Mount Lemmon Survey	·	1.4 km	MPC · JPL
893168	2016 DZ_{37}	—	February 28, 2016	Mount Lemmon	Mount Lemmon Survey	·	2.2 km	MPC · JPL
893169	2016 DK_{41}	—	February 18, 2016	Mount Lemmon	Mount Lemmon Survey	H	310 m	MPC · JPL
893170	2016 DG_{46}	—	February 29, 2016	Haleakala	Pan-STARRS 1	·	1.6 km	MPC · JPL
893171	2016 EZ_{1}	—	December 13, 2015	Haleakala	Pan-STARRS 1	H	500 m	MPC · JPL
893172	2016 ET_{3}	—	January 18, 2016	Haleakala	Pan-STARRS 1	MAS	480 m	MPC · JPL
893173	2016 EF_{5}	—	March 3, 2011	Mount Lemmon	Mount Lemmon Survey	H	290 m	MPC · JPL
893174	2016 EJ_{5}	—	January 28, 2016	Mount Lemmon	Mount Lemmon Survey	·	1.0 km	MPC · JPL
893175	2016 EF_{8}	—	February 9, 2016	Haleakala	Pan-STARRS 1	·	470 m	MPC · JPL
893176	2016 EY_{13}	—	March 3, 2016	Haleakala	Pan-STARRS 1	MAR	690 m	MPC · JPL
893177	2016 EE_{15}	—	March 3, 2016	Haleakala	Pan-STARRS 1	URS	2.4 km	MPC · JPL
893178	2016 EF_{19}	—	March 3, 2016	Haleakala	Pan-STARRS 1	URS	2.3 km	MPC · JPL
893179	2016 EY_{23}	—	March 3, 2016	Haleakala	Pan-STARRS 1	·	1.4 km	MPC · JPL
893180	2016 EZ_{27}	—	March 2, 2016	Haleakala	Pan-STARRS 1	APO	450 m	MPC · JPL
893181	2016 EJ_{32}	—	March 3, 2016	Haleakala	Pan-STARRS 1	·	1.7 km	MPC · JPL
893182	2016 EY_{35}	—	March 3, 2016	Haleakala	Pan-STARRS 1	·	1.7 km	MPC · JPL
893183	2016 EM_{38}	—	January 11, 2016	Haleakala	Pan-STARRS 1	·	1.8 km	MPC · JPL
893184	2016 EG_{43}	—	December 9, 2015	Haleakala	Pan-STARRS 1	·	1.8 km	MPC · JPL
893185	2016 EQ_{43}	—	September 19, 2014	Haleakala	Pan-STARRS 1	·	1.7 km	MPC · JPL
893186	2016 ET_{43}	—	February 5, 2016	Haleakala	Pan-STARRS 1	·	1.4 km	MPC · JPL
893187	2016 ED_{48}	—	March 4, 2016	Haleakala	Pan-STARRS 1	EUN	730 m	MPC · JPL
893188	2016 EJ_{53}	—	March 3, 2016	Haleakala	Pan-STARRS 1	·	2.2 km	MPC · JPL
893189	2016 EW_{54}	—	March 4, 2016	Mount Lemmon	Mount Lemmon Survey	H	320 m	MPC · JPL
893190	2016 EY_{54}	—	February 11, 2016	Haleakala	Pan-STARRS 1	H	360 m	MPC · JPL
893191	2016 EM_{61}	—	January 18, 2016	Haleakala	Pan-STARRS 1	·	1.8 km	MPC · JPL
893192	2016 ET_{63}	—	March 4, 2016	Haleakala	Pan-STARRS 1	EUN	630 m	MPC · JPL
893193	2016 EH_{71}	—	March 5, 2016	Haleakala	Pan-STARRS 1	·	510 m	MPC · JPL
893194	2016 EU_{85}	—	March 10, 2016	Haleakala	Pan-STARRS 1	APO · PHA	460 m	MPC · JPL
893195	2016 EH_{97}	—	April 11, 2013	Kitt Peak	Spacewatch	·	530 m	MPC · JPL
893196	2016 EZ_{102}	—	March 7, 2016	Haleakala	Pan-STARRS 1	·	1.2 km	MPC · JPL
893197	2016 EG_{103}	—	February 11, 2016	Haleakala	Pan-STARRS 1	EOS	1.4 km	MPC · JPL
893198	2016 EP_{104}	—	February 3, 2016	Haleakala	Pan-STARRS 1	·	750 m	MPC · JPL
893199	2016 EO_{106}	—	December 13, 2014	Haleakala	Pan-STARRS 1	EOS	1.2 km	MPC · JPL
893200	2016 EY_{107}	—	March 3, 2016	Haleakala	Pan-STARRS 1	·	1.7 km	MPC · JPL

== 893201–893300 ==
back to top

Designation			Discovery			Properties		Ref
Permanent	Provisional	Named after	Date	Site	Discoverer(s)	Category	Diam.	Ref
893201	2016 EV_{118}	—	May 12, 2013	Haleakala	Pan-STARRS 1	·	440 m	MPC · JPL
893202	2016 EK_{129}	—	February 4, 2009	Mount Lemmon	Mount Lemmon Survey	·	570 m	MPC · JPL
893203	2016 EU_{132}	—	March 10, 2016	Haleakala	Pan-STARRS 1	·	420 m	MPC · JPL
893204	2016 EJ_{133}	—	March 23, 2012	Mount Lemmon	Mount Lemmon Survey	·	690 m	MPC · JPL
893205	2016 EC_{136}	—	February 10, 2016	Haleakala	Pan-STARRS 1	·	680 m	MPC · JPL
893206	2016 EB_{137}	—	November 29, 2014	Mount Lemmon	Mount Lemmon Survey	·	1.0 km	MPC · JPL
893207	2016 EZ_{138}	—	March 10, 2016	Haleakala	Pan-STARRS 1	·	1.5 km	MPC · JPL
893208	2016 EV_{143}	—	March 10, 2016	Haleakala	Pan-STARRS 1	·	1.8 km	MPC · JPL
893209	2016 EC_{145}	—	January 31, 2009	Kitt Peak	Spacewatch	·	450 m	MPC · JPL
893210	2016 EO_{152}	—	March 10, 2016	Haleakala	Pan-STARRS 1	·	1.3 km	MPC · JPL
893211	2016 ES_{153}	—	January 17, 2009	Kitt Peak	Spacewatch	(2076)	470 m	MPC · JPL
893212	2016 EA_{154}	—	February 20, 2009	Mount Lemmon	Mount Lemmon Survey	·	570 m	MPC · JPL
893213	2016 EY_{156}	—	March 10, 2016	Haleakala	Pan-STARRS 1	H	270 m	MPC · JPL
893214	2016 EX_{157}	—	February 9, 2016	Haleakala	Pan-STARRS 1	H	270 m	MPC · JPL
893215	2016 ER_{166}	—	September 3, 2008	Kitt Peak	Spacewatch	EOS	1.3 km	MPC · JPL
893216	2016 ED_{174}	—	March 12, 2016	Mount Lemmon	Mount Lemmon Survey	·	1.6 km	MPC · JPL
893217	2016 EN_{180}	—	March 4, 2016	Haleakala	Pan-STARRS 1	·	480 m	MPC · JPL
893218	2016 EC_{181}	—	April 6, 2011	Mount Lemmon	Mount Lemmon Survey	H	290 m	MPC · JPL
893219	2016 EW_{183}	—	December 11, 2014	Mount Lemmon	Mount Lemmon Survey	·	1.4 km	MPC · JPL
893220	2016 EY_{183}	—	March 12, 2016	Haleakala	Pan-STARRS 1	·	1.1 km	MPC · JPL
893221	2016 EV_{185}	—	January 9, 2016	Haleakala	Pan-STARRS 1	PHO	590 m	MPC · JPL
893222	2016 EP_{190}	—	November 20, 2014	Haleakala	Pan-STARRS 1	·	1.2 km	MPC · JPL
893223	2016 EA_{201}	—	March 2, 2009	Mount Lemmon	Mount Lemmon Survey	·	470 m	MPC · JPL
893224	2016 EM_{204}	—	November 20, 2014	Haleakala	Pan-STARRS 1	H	450 m	MPC · JPL
893225	2016 EJ_{205}	—	March 4, 2016	Haleakala	Pan-STARRS 1	H	310 m	MPC · JPL
893226	2016 EN_{205}	—	March 4, 2016	Haleakala	Pan-STARRS 1	H	370 m	MPC · JPL
893227	2016 EB_{206}	—	March 14, 2016	Mount Lemmon	Mount Lemmon Survey	H	390 m	MPC · JPL
893228	2016 EO_{206}	—	March 4, 2016	Haleakala	Pan-STARRS 1	H	260 m	MPC · JPL
893229	2016 EE_{207}	—	March 12, 2016	Haleakala	Pan-STARRS 1	H	270 m	MPC · JPL
893230	2016 EM_{208}	—	March 4, 2016	Haleakala	Pan-STARRS 1	EOS	1.5 km	MPC · JPL
893231	2016 EN_{212}	—	March 10, 2016	Haleakala	Pan-STARRS 1	·	1.5 km	MPC · JPL
893232	2016 EH_{213}	—	March 11, 2016	Haleakala	Pan-STARRS 1	·	2.0 km	MPC · JPL
893233	2016 EB_{215}	—	March 15, 2016	Haleakala	Pan-STARRS 1	·	2.5 km	MPC · JPL
893234	2016 EC_{215}	—	March 15, 2016	Haleakala	Pan-STARRS 1	·	1.6 km	MPC · JPL
893235	2016 EC_{224}	—	October 5, 2013	Haleakala	Pan-STARRS 1	·	1.6 km	MPC · JPL
893236	2016 EA_{234}	—	March 4, 2016	Haleakala	Pan-STARRS 1	·	1.5 km	MPC · JPL
893237	2016 EU_{234}	—	January 15, 2015	Mount Lemmon	Mount Lemmon Survey	·	2.1 km	MPC · JPL
893238	2016 EW_{234}	—	January 17, 2015	Haleakala	Pan-STARRS 1	·	2.1 km	MPC · JPL
893239	2016 EG_{238}	—	April 7, 2011	Kitt Peak	Spacewatch	·	1.8 km	MPC · JPL
893240	2016 EK_{243}	—	April 12, 2011	Mount Lemmon	Mount Lemmon Survey	·	1.0 km	MPC · JPL
893241	2016 EM_{243}	—	April 2, 2011	Kitt Peak	Spacewatch	·	1.3 km	MPC · JPL
893242	2016 EP_{247}	—	November 27, 2014	Haleakala	Pan-STARRS 1	·	920 m	MPC · JPL
893243	2016 EJ_{249}	—	January 24, 2015	Haleakala	Pan-STARRS 1	·	1.7 km	MPC · JPL
893244	2016 EP_{252}	—	March 8, 2016	Haleakala	Pan-STARRS 1	·	2.1 km	MPC · JPL
893245	2016 ES_{252}	—	March 4, 2016	Haleakala	Pan-STARRS 1	·	1.7 km	MPC · JPL
893246	2016 EB_{253}	—	March 10, 2016	Mount Lemmon	Mount Lemmon Survey	H	290 m	MPC · JPL
893247	2016 EL_{254}	—	March 6, 2016	Haleakala	Pan-STARRS 1	·	510 m	MPC · JPL
893248	2016 EN_{254}	—	March 6, 2016	Haleakala	Pan-STARRS 1	·	450 m	MPC · JPL
893249	2016 EE_{258}	—	March 7, 2016	Haleakala	Pan-STARRS 1	·	1.7 km	MPC · JPL
893250	2016 EO_{258}	—	March 15, 2012	Haleakala	Pan-STARRS 1	(1547)	1.1 km	MPC · JPL
893251	2016 EL_{259}	—	March 4, 2016	Haleakala	Pan-STARRS 1	H	300 m	MPC · JPL
893252	2016 EQ_{259}	—	March 4, 2016	Haleakala	Pan-STARRS 1	·	450 m	MPC · JPL
893253	2016 EM_{260}	—	March 4, 2016	Haleakala	Pan-STARRS 1	·	2.2 km	MPC · JPL
893254	2016 EN_{260}	—	March 10, 2016	Haleakala	Pan-STARRS 1	·	500 m	MPC · JPL
893255	2016 EQ_{260}	—	March 14, 2016	Mount Lemmon	Mount Lemmon Survey	·	1.4 km	MPC · JPL
893256	2016 EH_{261}	—	March 7, 2016	Haleakala	Pan-STARRS 1	VER	1.9 km	MPC · JPL
893257	2016 ER_{261}	—	March 13, 2016	Haleakala	Pan-STARRS 1	·	1.1 km	MPC · JPL
893258	2016 EB_{262}	—	March 5, 2016	Haleakala	Pan-STARRS 1	·	2.6 km	MPC · JPL
893259	2016 EK_{262}	—	March 13, 2016	Haleakala	Pan-STARRS 1	·	630 m	MPC · JPL
893260	2016 EE_{263}	—	March 10, 2016	Haleakala	Pan-STARRS 1	EOS	1.3 km	MPC · JPL
893261	2016 EL_{263}	—	March 4, 2016	Haleakala	Pan-STARRS 1	(1118)	2.5 km	MPC · JPL
893262	2016 EP_{263}	—	March 4, 2016	Mount Lemmon	Mount Lemmon Survey	·	1.7 km	MPC · JPL
893263	2016 ER_{268}	—	March 10, 2016	Haleakala	Pan-STARRS 1	·	430 m	MPC · JPL
893264	2016 EC_{270}	—	March 13, 2016	Haleakala	Pan-STARRS 1	·	750 m	MPC · JPL
893265	2016 EH_{270}	—	March 6, 2016	Haleakala	Pan-STARRS 1	·	770 m	MPC · JPL
893266	2016 EZ_{271}	—	March 4, 2016	Haleakala	Pan-STARRS 1	·	460 m	MPC · JPL
893267	2016 EB_{274}	—	March 13, 2016	Haleakala	Pan-STARRS 1	·	440 m	MPC · JPL
893268	2016 EH_{274}	—	March 12, 2016	Haleakala	Pan-STARRS 1	(883)	540 m	MPC · JPL
893269	2016 EL_{274}	—	March 13, 2016	Haleakala	Pan-STARRS 1	·	510 m	MPC · JPL
893270	2016 EA_{275}	—	March 11, 2016	Haleakala	Pan-STARRS 1	·	1.9 km	MPC · JPL
893271	2016 EP_{275}	—	March 4, 2016	Haleakala	Pan-STARRS 1	EOS	1.3 km	MPC · JPL
893272	2016 EG_{277}	—	March 11, 2016	Haleakala	Pan-STARRS 1	EOS	1.5 km	MPC · JPL
893273	2016 EU_{277}	—	March 10, 2016	Haleakala	Pan-STARRS 1	·	420 m	MPC · JPL
893274	2016 EZ_{277}	—	March 1, 2016	Mount Lemmon	Mount Lemmon Survey	TIR	2.2 km	MPC · JPL
893275	2016 EN_{279}	—	March 12, 2016	Haleakala	Pan-STARRS 1	·	450 m	MPC · JPL
893276	2016 EF_{282}	—	March 6, 2016	Haleakala	Pan-STARRS 1	·	1.1 km	MPC · JPL
893277	2016 EF_{287}	—	March 3, 2016	Haleakala	Pan-STARRS 1	·	1.5 km	MPC · JPL
893278	2016 EU_{287}	—	March 1, 2016	Haleakala	Pan-STARRS 1	·	550 m	MPC · JPL
893279	2016 EQ_{288}	—	March 4, 2016	Haleakala	Pan-STARRS 1	EOS	1.3 km	MPC · JPL
893280	2016 EH_{291}	—	March 5, 2016	Haleakala	Pan-STARRS 1	H	280 m	MPC · JPL
893281	2016 EM_{291}	—	March 2, 2016	Haleakala	Pan-STARRS 1	H	350 m	MPC · JPL
893282	2016 EX_{291}	—	March 6, 2016	Haleakala	Pan-STARRS 1	·	1.2 km	MPC · JPL
893283	2016 EO_{292}	—	March 7, 2016	Haleakala	Pan-STARRS 1	·	1.6 km	MPC · JPL
893284	2016 ER_{293}	—	March 11, 2016	Haleakala	Pan-STARRS 1	EOS	1.4 km	MPC · JPL
893285	2016 EL_{295}	—	January 16, 2015	Haleakala	Pan-STARRS 1	·	1.3 km	MPC · JPL
893286	2016 EN_{295}	—	March 6, 2016	Haleakala	Pan-STARRS 1	H	230 m	MPC · JPL
893287	2016 EV_{295}	—	March 4, 2016	Haleakala	Pan-STARRS 1	·	1.5 km	MPC · JPL
893288	2016 ET_{296}	—	March 3, 2016	Haleakala	Pan-STARRS 1	·	1.6 km	MPC · JPL
893289	2016 EY_{297}	—	February 10, 2016	Haleakala	Pan-STARRS 1	·	1.7 km	MPC · JPL
893290	2016 EZ_{297}	—	March 10, 2016	Haleakala	Pan-STARRS 1	·	1.3 km	MPC · JPL
893291	2016 EB_{300}	—	March 4, 2016	Haleakala	Pan-STARRS 1	·	1.8 km	MPC · JPL
893292	2016 EQ_{304}	—	March 13, 2016	Haleakala	Pan-STARRS 1	EOS	1.3 km	MPC · JPL
893293	2016 EJ_{311}	—	March 10, 2016	Mount Lemmon	Mount Lemmon Survey	·	1.4 km	MPC · JPL
893294	2016 EG_{314}	—	March 5, 2016	Haleakala	Pan-STARRS 1	·	2.2 km	MPC · JPL
893295	2016 EL_{314}	—	March 7, 2016	Haleakala	Pan-STARRS 1	·	2.0 km	MPC · JPL
893296	2016 ET_{317}	—	March 11, 2016	Haleakala	Pan-STARRS 1	·	450 m	MPC · JPL
893297	2016 EH_{319}	—	March 12, 2016	Haleakala	Pan-STARRS 1	·	1.3 km	MPC · JPL
893298	2016 EH_{322}	—	March 6, 2016	Haleakala	Pan-STARRS 1	EOS	1.3 km	MPC · JPL
893299	2016 EC_{323}	—	March 10, 2016	Mount Lemmon	Mount Lemmon Survey	·	510 m	MPC · JPL
893300	2016 EJ_{323}	—	January 18, 2009	Kitt Peak	Spacewatch	·	390 m	MPC · JPL

== 893301–893400 ==
back to top

Designation			Discovery			Properties		Ref
Permanent	Provisional	Named after	Date	Site	Discoverer(s)	Category	Diam.	Ref
893301	2016 EM_{338}	—	March 11, 2011	Mount Lemmon	Mount Lemmon Survey	·	1.3 km	MPC · JPL
893302	2016 EW_{339}	—	March 4, 2016	Mount Lemmon	Mount Lemmon Survey	·	1.4 km	MPC · JPL
893303	2016 EE_{354}	—	March 5, 2016	Haleakala	Pan-STARRS 1	·	1.5 km	MPC · JPL
893304	2016 EQ_{362}	—	September 13, 2018	Mount Lemmon	Mount Lemmon Survey	·	2.2 km	MPC · JPL
893305	2016 ET_{392}	—	March 11, 2016	Mount Lemmon	Mount Lemmon Survey	·	1.3 km	MPC · JPL
893306	2016 EN_{396}	—	January 16, 2015	Haleakala	Pan-STARRS 1	·	2.3 km	MPC · JPL
893307	2016 EV_{396}	—	November 21, 2014	Haleakala	Pan-STARRS 1	·	960 m	MPC · JPL
893308	2016 FM_{3}	—	March 16, 2016	Haleakala	Pan-STARRS 1	H	380 m	MPC · JPL
893309	2016 FE_{11}	—	April 12, 2011	Mount Lemmon	Mount Lemmon Survey	·	1.9 km	MPC · JPL
893310	2016 FA_{16}	—	March 28, 2016	Mount Lemmon	Mount Lemmon Survey	H	300 m	MPC · JPL
893311	2016 FB_{16}	—	March 10, 2016	Haleakala	Pan-STARRS 1	(2076)	450 m	MPC · JPL
893312	2016 FQ_{25}	—	February 1, 2012	Mount Lemmon	Mount Lemmon Survey	·	680 m	MPC · JPL
893313	2016 FV_{25}	—	October 23, 2004	Kitt Peak	Spacewatch	·	500 m	MPC · JPL
893314	2016 FT_{26}	—	February 3, 2009	Kitt Peak	Spacewatch	·	410 m	MPC · JPL
893315	2016 FN_{32}	—	March 10, 2016	Haleakala	Pan-STARRS 1	·	1.1 km	MPC · JPL
893316	2016 FU_{32}	—	March 12, 2016	Haleakala	Pan-STARRS 1	·	1.2 km	MPC · JPL
893317	2016 FA_{34}	—	October 1, 2014	Mount Lemmon	Mount Lemmon Survey	·	480 m	MPC · JPL
893318	2016 FP_{39}	—	February 10, 2016	Haleakala	Pan-STARRS 1	·	530 m	MPC · JPL
893319	2016 FA_{48}	—	March 12, 2016	Haleakala	Pan-STARRS 1	·	830 m	MPC · JPL
893320	2016 FC_{49}	—	March 31, 2016	Haleakala	Pan-STARRS 1	(2076)	510 m	MPC · JPL
893321	2016 FM_{50}	—	November 17, 2014	Haleakala	Pan-STARRS 1	·	1.8 km	MPC · JPL
893322	2016 FO_{52}	—	March 31, 2016	Haleakala	Pan-STARRS 1	·	480 m	MPC · JPL
893323	2016 FE_{56}	—	April 3, 2011	Haleakala	Pan-STARRS 1	·	1.2 km	MPC · JPL
893324	2016 FC_{63}	—	March 16, 2005	Mount Lemmon	Mount Lemmon Survey	·	1.5 km	MPC · JPL
893325	2016 FT_{66}	—	September 14, 2013	Haleakala	Pan-STARRS 1	TRE	2.0 km	MPC · JPL
893326	2016 FS_{68}	—	March 19, 2016	Haleakala	Pan-STARRS 1	·	1.8 km	MPC · JPL
893327	2016 FJ_{70}	—	March 31, 2016	Mount Lemmon	Mount Lemmon Survey	·	450 m	MPC · JPL
893328	2016 FN_{70}	—	March 31, 2016	Haleakala	Pan-STARRS 1	·	1.6 km	MPC · JPL
893329	2016 FS_{70}	—	March 16, 2016	Haleakala	Pan-STARRS 1	·	450 m	MPC · JPL
893330	2016 FY_{70}	—	March 30, 2016	Haleakala	Pan-STARRS 1	EUP	1.8 km	MPC · JPL
893331	2016 FX_{73}	—	March 16, 2016	Haleakala	Pan-STARRS 1	·	1.9 km	MPC · JPL
893332	2016 FO_{74}	—	March 16, 2016	Haleakala	Pan-STARRS 1	·	530 m	MPC · JPL
893333	2016 FH_{77}	—	March 16, 2016	Haleakala	Pan-STARRS 1	EOS	1.3 km	MPC · JPL
893334	2016 FO_{77}	—	January 16, 2015	Haleakala	Pan-STARRS 1	·	1.8 km	MPC · JPL
893335	2016 FD_{78}	—	March 30, 2016	Haleakala	Pan-STARRS 1	·	1.5 km	MPC · JPL
893336	2016 FD_{80}	—	March 16, 2016	Haleakala	Pan-STARRS 1	·	490 m	MPC · JPL
893337	2016 FN_{91}	—	March 28, 2016	Cerro Tololo-DECam	DECam	EOS	1.2 km	MPC · JPL
893338	2016 FV_{99}	—	March 29, 2016	Cerro Tololo-DECam	DECam	·	760 m	MPC · JPL
893339	2016 FU_{100}	—	March 30, 2016	Haleakala	Pan-STARRS 1	EOS	1.3 km	MPC · JPL
893340	2016 FU_{166}	—	March 28, 2016	Cerro Tololo-DECam	DECam	·	2.0 km	MPC · JPL
893341	2016 FY_{189}	—	December 29, 2014	Haleakala	Pan-STARRS 1	·	1.9 km	MPC · JPL
893342	2016 FE_{193}	—	March 31, 2016	Cerro Tololo-DECam	DECam	·	1.9 km	MPC · JPL
893343	2016 GB_{3}	—	April 1, 2016	Haleakala	Pan-STARRS 1	H	270 m	MPC · JPL
893344	2016 GW_{14}	—	February 10, 2016	Haleakala	Pan-STARRS 1	·	1.5 km	MPC · JPL
893345	2016 GS_{17}	—	May 19, 2006	Mount Lemmon	Mount Lemmon Survey	·	510 m	MPC · JPL
893346	2016 GN_{19}	—	March 10, 2016	Haleakala	Pan-STARRS 1	EOS	1.3 km	MPC · JPL
893347	2016 GL_{32}	—	September 12, 2013	Kitt Peak	Spacewatch	·	1.1 km	MPC · JPL
893348	2016 GO_{42}	—	March 31, 2016	Mount Lemmon	Mount Lemmon Survey	·	400 m	MPC · JPL
893349	2016 GT_{51}	—	April 1, 2016	Haleakala	Pan-STARRS 1	·	430 m	MPC · JPL
893350	2016 GL_{61}	—	May 8, 2011	Mount Lemmon	Mount Lemmon Survey	·	1.7 km	MPC · JPL
893351	2016 GP_{66}	—	March 31, 2016	Mount Lemmon	Mount Lemmon Survey	·	440 m	MPC · JPL
893352	2016 GT_{66}	—	January 19, 2016	Mount Lemmon	Mount Lemmon Survey	·	520 m	MPC · JPL
893353	2016 GK_{94}	—	April 1, 2016	Haleakala	Pan-STARRS 1	·	530 m	MPC · JPL
893354	2016 GR_{102}	—	March 4, 2016	Haleakala	Pan-STARRS 1	URS	2.3 km	MPC · JPL
893355	2016 GP_{104}	—	March 3, 2009	Mount Lemmon	Mount Lemmon Survey	·	430 m	MPC · JPL
893356	2016 GF_{105}	—	April 1, 2016	Haleakala	Pan-STARRS 1	·	1.4 km	MPC · JPL
893357	2016 GR_{111}	—	May 13, 2008	Mount Lemmon	Mount Lemmon Survey	·	680 m	MPC · JPL
893358	2016 GX_{112}	—	February 9, 2005	Mount Lemmon	Mount Lemmon Survey	·	630 m	MPC · JPL
893359	2016 GG_{115}	—	April 1, 2016	Haleakala	Pan-STARRS 1	EOS	1.2 km	MPC · JPL
893360	2016 GN_{129}	—	July 12, 2013	Haleakala	Pan-STARRS 1	·	460 m	MPC · JPL
893361	2016 GT_{129}	—	December 29, 2011	Mount Lemmon	Mount Lemmon Survey	·	680 m	MPC · JPL
893362	2016 GQ_{131}	—	February 9, 2016	Haleakala	Pan-STARRS 1	·	1.6 km	MPC · JPL
893363	2016 GR_{135}	—	March 6, 2016	Haleakala	Pan-STARRS 1	H	320 m	MPC · JPL
893364	2016 GJ_{137}	—	December 27, 2011	Mount Lemmon	Mount Lemmon Survey	·	640 m	MPC · JPL
893365	2016 GY_{138}	—	March 30, 2016	Haleakala	Pan-STARRS 1	·	1.9 km	MPC · JPL
893366	2016 GY_{155}	—	June 18, 2013	Haleakala	Pan-STARRS 1	·	680 m	MPC · JPL
893367	2016 GK_{160}	—	December 21, 2014	Haleakala	Pan-STARRS 1	EOS	1.2 km	MPC · JPL
893368	2016 GL_{160}	—	March 14, 2016	Mount Lemmon	Mount Lemmon Survey	·	1.5 km	MPC · JPL
893369	2016 GE_{164}	—	February 5, 2016	Haleakala	Pan-STARRS 1	·	480 m	MPC · JPL
893370	2016 GM_{168}	—	March 15, 2016	Mount Lemmon	Mount Lemmon Survey	·	490 m	MPC · JPL
893371	2016 GX_{173}	—	April 3, 2016	Haleakala	Pan-STARRS 1	·	450 m	MPC · JPL
893372	2016 GT_{176}	—	January 11, 2015	Haleakala	Pan-STARRS 1	·	2.1 km	MPC · JPL
893373	2016 GR_{178}	—	October 28, 2014	Haleakala	Pan-STARRS 1	·	1.1 km	MPC · JPL
893374	2016 GQ_{179}	—	March 26, 2011	Mount Lemmon	Mount Lemmon Survey	·	1.6 km	MPC · JPL
893375	2016 GT_{179}	—	December 30, 2008	Mount Lemmon	Mount Lemmon Survey	·	440 m	MPC · JPL
893376	2016 GM_{193}	—	January 20, 2015	Haleakala	Pan-STARRS 1	·	1.3 km	MPC · JPL
893377	2016 GS_{210}	—	November 17, 2014	Haleakala	Pan-STARRS 1	·	1.3 km	MPC · JPL
893378	2016 GJ_{215}	—	April 9, 2016	Haleakala	Pan-STARRS 1	·	830 m	MPC · JPL
893379	2016 GK_{221}	—	April 11, 2016	Haleakala	Pan-STARRS 1	H	340 m	MPC · JPL
893380	2016 GA_{229}	—	February 19, 2009	Kitt Peak	Spacewatch	·	450 m	MPC · JPL
893381	2016 GM_{232}	—	May 31, 2011	Mount Lemmon	Mount Lemmon Survey	·	860 m	MPC · JPL
893382	2016 GR_{232}	—	January 19, 2015	Haleakala	Pan-STARRS 1	·	1.8 km	MPC · JPL
893383	2016 GL_{236}	—	January 19, 2015	Mount Lemmon	Mount Lemmon Survey	EOS	1.4 km	MPC · JPL
893384	2016 GT_{244}	—	December 29, 2014	Haleakala	Pan-STARRS 1	·	1.4 km	MPC · JPL
893385	2016 GA_{246}	—	April 2, 2016	Kitt Peak	Spacewatch	·	1.5 km	MPC · JPL
893386	2016 GR_{250}	—	April 13, 2011	Kitt Peak	Spacewatch	·	1.2 km	MPC · JPL
893387	2016 GX_{250}	—	March 16, 2016	Haleakala	Pan-STARRS 1	EOS	1.3 km	MPC · JPL
893388	2016 GR_{253}	—	April 14, 2016	Haleakala	Pan-STARRS 1	H	450 m	MPC · JPL
893389	2016 GW_{253}	—	April 2, 2016	Haleakala	Pan-STARRS 1	H	330 m	MPC · JPL
893390	2016 GA_{254}	—	April 4, 2016	Haleakala	Pan-STARRS 1	H	340 m	MPC · JPL
893391	2016 GC_{254}	—	April 5, 2016	Haleakala	Pan-STARRS 1	H	310 m	MPC · JPL
893392	2016 GM_{254}	—	April 10, 2016	Haleakala	Pan-STARRS 1	H	320 m	MPC · JPL
893393	2016 GL_{266}	—	January 27, 2015	Haleakala	Pan-STARRS 1	·	2.2 km	MPC · JPL
893394	2016 GP_{269}	—	April 9, 2016	Haleakala	Pan-STARRS 1	H	330 m	MPC · JPL
893395	2016 GO_{270}	—	April 1, 2016	Haleakala	Pan-STARRS 1	·	480 m	MPC · JPL
893396	2016 GU_{270}	—	April 3, 2016	Haleakala	Pan-STARRS 1	·	1.8 km	MPC · JPL
893397	2016 GN_{272}	—	April 11, 2016	Haleakala	Pan-STARRS 1	·	470 m	MPC · JPL
893398	2016 GL_{274}	—	April 9, 2016	Haleakala	Pan-STARRS 1	·	1.5 km	MPC · JPL
893399	2016 GP_{274}	—	April 11, 2016	Haleakala	Pan-STARRS 1	·	1.9 km	MPC · JPL
893400	2016 GU_{274}	—	April 12, 2016	Haleakala	Pan-STARRS 1	·	500 m	MPC · JPL

== 893401–893500 ==
back to top

Designation			Discovery			Properties		Ref
Permanent	Provisional	Named after	Date	Site	Discoverer(s)	Category	Diam.	Ref
893401	2016 GK_{281}	—	April 15, 2016	Mount Lemmon	Mount Lemmon Survey	·	1.0 km	MPC · JPL
893402	2016 GF_{284}	—	April 11, 2016	Haleakala	Pan-STARRS 1	·	690 m	MPC · JPL
893403	2016 GC_{286}	—	April 5, 2016	Haleakala	Pan-STARRS 1	·	1.4 km	MPC · JPL
893404	2016 GE_{286}	—	April 5, 2016	Haleakala	Pan-STARRS 1	·	440 m	MPC · JPL
893405	2016 GO_{286}	—	April 14, 2016	Haleakala	Pan-STARRS 1	·	600 m	MPC · JPL
893406	2016 GP_{286}	—	August 12, 2013	Haleakala	Pan-STARRS 1	·	440 m	MPC · JPL
893407	2016 GD_{287}	—	April 5, 2016	Haleakala	Pan-STARRS 1	·	1.1 km	MPC · JPL
893408	2016 GA_{288}	—	April 14, 2016	Haleakala	Pan-STARRS 1	·	1.3 km	MPC · JPL
893409	2016 GY_{289}	—	December 21, 2014	Haleakala	Pan-STARRS 1	·	1.8 km	MPC · JPL
893410	2016 GZ_{293}	—	April 10, 2016	Haleakala	Pan-STARRS 1	H	370 m	MPC · JPL
893411	2016 GA_{294}	—	April 3, 2016	Mount Lemmon	Mount Lemmon Survey	H	310 m	MPC · JPL
893412	2016 GE_{295}	—	April 1, 2016	Haleakala	Pan-STARRS 1	EOS	1.4 km	MPC · JPL
893413	2016 GK_{295}	—	April 10, 2016	Haleakala	Pan-STARRS 1	H	290 m	MPC · JPL
893414	2016 GQ_{295}	—	April 15, 2016	Mount Lemmon	Mount Lemmon Survey	H	290 m	MPC · JPL
893415	2016 GK_{296}	—	April 1, 2016	Haleakala	Pan-STARRS 1	EOS	1.2 km	MPC · JPL
893416	2016 GO_{297}	—	April 6, 2016	Mount Lemmon	Mount Lemmon Survey	·	1.9 km	MPC · JPL
893417	2016 GV_{297}	—	January 17, 2015	Mount Lemmon	Mount Lemmon Survey	·	1.5 km	MPC · JPL
893418	2016 GZ_{297}	—	April 3, 2016	Haleakala	Pan-STARRS 1	·	1.8 km	MPC · JPL
893419	2016 GB_{298}	—	April 1, 2016	Haleakala	Pan-STARRS 1	·	2.0 km	MPC · JPL
893420	2016 GJ_{298}	—	April 10, 2016	Haleakala	Pan-STARRS 1	·	1.1 km	MPC · JPL
893421	2016 GF_{301}	—	April 9, 2016	Haleakala	Pan-STARRS 1	·	2.4 km	MPC · JPL
893422	2016 GV_{301}	—	April 5, 2016	Haleakala	Pan-STARRS 1	·	1.2 km	MPC · JPL
893423	2016 GK_{302}	—	April 12, 2016	Haleakala	Pan-STARRS 1	·	1.6 km	MPC · JPL
893424	2016 GL_{304}	—	April 12, 2016	Haleakala	Pan-STARRS 1	·	660 m	MPC · JPL
893425	2016 GV_{305}	—	April 3, 2016	Haleakala	Pan-STARRS 1	·	830 m	MPC · JPL
893426	2016 GN_{306}	—	April 10, 2016	Haleakala	Pan-STARRS 1	H	380 m	MPC · JPL
893427	2016 GE_{307}	—	April 4, 2016	Haleakala	Pan-STARRS 1	·	520 m	MPC · JPL
893428	2016 GV_{308}	—	April 5, 2016	Haleakala	Pan-STARRS 1	EOS	1.2 km	MPC · JPL
893429	2016 GW_{309}	—	April 14, 2016	Haleakala	Pan-STARRS 1	V	450 m	MPC · JPL
893430	2016 GL_{310}	—	April 4, 2016	Haleakala	Pan-STARRS 1	EOS	1.4 km	MPC · JPL
893431	2016 GK_{311}	—	April 3, 2016	Haleakala	Pan-STARRS 1	·	1.5 km	MPC · JPL
893432	2016 GF_{312}	—	April 5, 2016	Haleakala	Pan-STARRS 1	V	370 m	MPC · JPL
893433	2016 GJ_{312}	—	April 3, 2016	Mount Lemmon	Mount Lemmon Survey	·	510 m	MPC · JPL
893434	2016 GS_{313}	—	May 7, 2006	Mount Lemmon	Mount Lemmon Survey	·	610 m	MPC · JPL
893435	2016 GH_{314}	—	April 1, 2016	Haleakala	Pan-STARRS 1	LUT	2.7 km	MPC · JPL
893436	2016 GG_{318}	—	April 3, 2016	Haleakala	Pan-STARRS 1	EOS	1.3 km	MPC · JPL
893437	2016 GR_{325}	—	April 12, 2016	Haleakala	Pan-STARRS 1	·	480 m	MPC · JPL
893438	2016 GX_{333}	—	April 10, 2016	Haleakala	Pan-STARRS 1	·	2.5 km	MPC · JPL
893439	2016 GO_{340}	—	April 3, 2016	Haleakala	Pan-STARRS 1	·	510 m	MPC · JPL
893440	2016 GV_{356}	—	April 13, 2016	Mount Lemmon	Mount Lemmon Survey	EOS	1.4 km	MPC · JPL
893441	2016 GO_{357}	—	January 15, 2015	Haleakala	Pan-STARRS 1	·	1.4 km	MPC · JPL
893442	2016 GW_{360}	—	March 1, 2016	Haleakala	Pan-STARRS 1	·	2.2 km	MPC · JPL
893443	2016 GO_{363}	—	April 1, 2016	Haleakala	Pan-STARRS 1	·	1.3 km	MPC · JPL
893444	2016 GF_{365}	—	April 9, 2016	Haleakala	Pan-STARRS 1	H	340 m	MPC · JPL
893445	2016 GJ_{376}	—	December 29, 2014	Haleakala	Pan-STARRS 1	·	1.9 km	MPC · JPL
893446	2016 GQ_{393}	—	April 12, 2016	Haleakala	Pan-STARRS 1	·	2.2 km	MPC · JPL
893447	2016 GS_{393}	—	April 1, 2016	Mount Lemmon	Mount Lemmon Survey	·	1.4 km	MPC · JPL
893448	2016 GH_{400}	—	October 7, 2007	Mount Lemmon	Mount Lemmon Survey	·	430 m	MPC · JPL
893449	2016 HJ_{5}	—	February 10, 2016	Haleakala	Pan-STARRS 1	·	1.9 km	MPC · JPL
893450	2016 HL_{7}	—	April 27, 2016	Mount Lemmon	Mount Lemmon Survey	·	2.0 km	MPC · JPL
893451	2016 HY_{10}	—	January 22, 2015	Haleakala	Pan-STARRS 1	·	1.8 km	MPC · JPL
893452	2016 HQ_{24}	—	April 27, 2016	Mount Lemmon	Mount Lemmon Survey	·	1.3 km	MPC · JPL
893453	2016 HK_{25}	—	January 27, 2015	Haleakala	Pan-STARRS 1	·	2.1 km	MPC · JPL
893454	2016 HW_{25}	—	December 29, 2014	Haleakala	Pan-STARRS 1	·	1.8 km	MPC · JPL
893455	2016 HR_{26}	—	April 17, 2016	Haleakala	Pan-STARRS 1	PHO	530 m	MPC · JPL
893456	2016 HU_{26}	—	April 17, 2016	Haleakala	Pan-STARRS 1	H	410 m	MPC · JPL
893457	2016 HB_{27}	—	April 30, 2016	Haleakala	Pan-STARRS 1	H	330 m	MPC · JPL
893458	2016 HT_{27}	—	April 27, 2016	Mount Lemmon	Mount Lemmon Survey	·	480 m	MPC · JPL
893459	2016 HW_{29}	—	April 27, 2016	Haleakala	Pan-STARRS 1	PHO	580 m	MPC · JPL
893460	2016 HA_{30}	—	April 27, 2016	Mount Lemmon	Mount Lemmon Survey	·	470 m	MPC · JPL
893461	2016 HQ_{31}	—	December 28, 2014	Mount Lemmon	Mount Lemmon Survey	·	2.3 km	MPC · JPL
893462	2016 HA_{34}	—	April 29, 2016	Kitt Peak	Spacewatch	·	1.2 km	MPC · JPL
893463	2016 HO_{34}	—	April 30, 2016	Haleakala	Pan-STARRS 1	·	920 m	MPC · JPL
893464	2016 HM_{35}	—	April 16, 2016	Haleakala	Pan-STARRS 1	·	410 m	MPC · JPL
893465	2016 HR_{42}	—	November 26, 2014	Haleakala	Pan-STARRS 1	·	1.8 km	MPC · JPL
893466	2016 HE_{47}	—	April 30, 2016	Haleakala	Pan-STARRS 1	·	1.9 km	MPC · JPL
893467	2016 JP_{1}	—	April 9, 2016	Haleakala	Pan-STARRS 1	·	560 m	MPC · JPL
893468	2016 JN_{4}	—	April 4, 2016	Haleakala	Pan-STARRS 1	·	770 m	MPC · JPL
893469	2016 JX_{10}	—	January 13, 2015	Haleakala	Pan-STARRS 1	·	1.5 km	MPC · JPL
893470	2016 JB_{11}	—	March 4, 2016	Haleakala	Pan-STARRS 1	·	990 m	MPC · JPL
893471	2016 JE_{17}	—	March 15, 2016	Haleakala	Pan-STARRS 1	H	360 m	MPC · JPL
893472	2016 JY_{17}	—	May 6, 2016	Haleakala	Pan-STARRS 1	H	340 m	MPC · JPL
893473	2016 JH_{31}	—	January 25, 2009	Kitt Peak	Spacewatch	·	480 m	MPC · JPL
893474	2016 JF_{39}	—	May 2, 2016	Haleakala	Pan-STARRS 1	H	400 m	MPC · JPL
893475	2016 JK_{39}	—	May 15, 2016	Haleakala	Pan-STARRS 1	H	380 m	MPC · JPL
893476	2016 JU_{41}	—	January 19, 2015	Haleakala	Pan-STARRS 1	·	2.2 km	MPC · JPL
893477	2016 JV_{41}	—	February 27, 2015	Haleakala	Pan-STARRS 1	·	2.4 km	MPC · JPL
893478	2016 JX_{41}	—	February 15, 2015	Haleakala	Pan-STARRS 1	·	2.4 km	MPC · JPL
893479	2016 JB_{42}	—	January 14, 2015	Haleakala	Pan-STARRS 1	·	1.8 km	MPC · JPL
893480	2016 JP_{44}	—	May 15, 2016	Haleakala	Pan-STARRS 1	PHO	520 m	MPC · JPL
893481	2016 JS_{45}	—	May 14, 2016	Mount Lemmon	Mount Lemmon Survey	·	2.3 km	MPC · JPL
893482	2016 JS_{47}	—	May 1, 2016	Haleakala	Pan-STARRS 1	·	1.1 km	MPC · JPL
893483	2016 JG_{48}	—	May 12, 2016	Haleakala	Pan-STARRS 1	·	710 m	MPC · JPL
893484	2016 JR_{49}	—	May 13, 2016	Haleakala	Pan-STARRS 1	·	2.2 km	MPC · JPL
893485	2016 JM_{50}	—	May 2, 2016	Mount Lemmon	Mount Lemmon Survey	·	2.4 km	MPC · JPL
893486	2016 JX_{51}	—	May 1, 2016	Haleakala	Pan-STARRS 1	·	1.3 km	MPC · JPL
893487	2016 JD_{52}	—	May 10, 2016	Mount Lemmon	Mount Lemmon Survey	H	370 m	MPC · JPL
893488	2016 JE_{52}	—	May 6, 2016	Haleakala	Pan-STARRS 1	H	410 m	MPC · JPL
893489	2016 JT_{52}	—	May 2, 2016	Haleakala	Pan-STARRS 1	·	650 m	MPC · JPL
893490	2016 JC_{55}	—	May 13, 2016	Mount Lemmon	Mount Lemmon Survey	H	330 m	MPC · JPL
893491	2016 JX_{55}	—	May 2, 2016	Haleakala	Pan-STARRS 1	·	2.2 km	MPC · JPL
893492	2016 JG_{71}	—	May 6, 2016	Haleakala	Pan-STARRS 1	H	350 m	MPC · JPL
893493	2016 JH_{80}	—	May 3, 2016	Cerro Paranal	Gaia Ground Based Optical Tracking	·	540 m	MPC · JPL
893494	2016 JZ_{81}	—	May 2, 2016	Haleakala	Pan-STARRS 1	·	1.9 km	MPC · JPL
893495	2016 KO_{4}	—	May 30, 2016	Haleakala	Pan-STARRS 1	H	370 m	MPC · JPL
893496	2016 KF_{8}	—	May 30, 2016	Haleakala	Pan-STARRS 1	·	1.8 km	MPC · JPL
893497	2016 KP_{9}	—	May 30, 2016	Haleakala	Pan-STARRS 1	·	1.3 km	MPC · JPL
893498	2016 KS_{10}	—	May 30, 2016	Haleakala	Pan-STARRS 1	·	2.1 km	MPC · JPL
893499	2016 KX_{12}	—	May 30, 2016	Haleakala	Pan-STARRS 1	H	380 m	MPC · JPL
893500	2016 LF_{1}	—	January 9, 2015	Haleakala	Pan-STARRS 1	H	310 m	MPC · JPL

== 893501–893600 ==
back to top

Designation			Discovery			Properties		Ref
Permanent	Provisional	Named after	Date	Site	Discoverer(s)	Category	Diam.	Ref
893501	2016 LT_{3}	—	February 7, 2016	Mount Lemmon	Mount Lemmon Survey	PHO	840 m	MPC · JPL
893502	2016 LG_{7}	—	June 4, 2016	Mount Lemmon	Mount Lemmon Survey	·	1.1 km	MPC · JPL
893503	2016 LM_{10}	—	May 13, 2016	Haleakala	Pan-STARRS 1	H	350 m	MPC · JPL
893504	2016 LB_{11}	—	June 5, 2016	Haleakala	Pan-STARRS 1	H	340 m	MPC · JPL
893505	2016 LS_{11}	—	May 30, 2016	Haleakala	Pan-STARRS 1	H	340 m	MPC · JPL
893506	2016 LQ_{12}	—	December 21, 2014	Mount Lemmon	Mount Lemmon Survey	·	2.1 km	MPC · JPL
893507	2016 LX_{13}	—	February 12, 2015	Haleakala	Pan-STARRS 1	EOS	1.1 km	MPC · JPL
893508	2016 LA_{16}	—	May 15, 2016	Haleakala	Pan-STARRS 1	PHO	570 m	MPC · JPL
893509	2016 LA_{22}	—	December 22, 2012	Haleakala	Pan-STARRS 1	L4	5.8 km	MPC · JPL
893510	2016 LW_{22}	—	May 30, 2016	Haleakala	Pan-STARRS 1	·	870 m	MPC · JPL
893511	2016 LL_{31}	—	February 1, 2012	Mount Lemmon	Mount Lemmon Survey	·	470 m	MPC · JPL
893512	2016 LH_{32}	—	February 19, 2015	Haleakala	Pan-STARRS 1	·	2.1 km	MPC · JPL
893513	2016 LE_{34}	—	January 20, 2015	Haleakala	Pan-STARRS 1	·	1.1 km	MPC · JPL
893514	2016 LS_{44}	—	February 23, 2015	Haleakala	Pan-STARRS 1	·	2.2 km	MPC · JPL
893515	2016 LO_{47}	—	April 20, 2010	Mount Lemmon	Mount Lemmon Survey	·	2.8 km	MPC · JPL
893516	2016 LA_{51}	—	June 14, 2016	Mount Lemmon	Mount Lemmon Survey	·	1.1 km	MPC · JPL
893517	2016 LE_{52}	—	December 12, 2014	Haleakala	Pan-STARRS 1	H	350 m	MPC · JPL
893518	2016 LF_{53}	—	June 5, 2016	Haleakala	Pan-STARRS 1	H	330 m	MPC · JPL
893519	2016 LM_{53}	—	June 8, 2016	Haleakala	Pan-STARRS 1	H	390 m	MPC · JPL
893520	2016 LC_{61}	—	January 22, 2015	Haleakala	Pan-STARRS 1	·	2.1 km	MPC · JPL
893521	2016 LD_{68}	—	June 8, 2016	Mount Lemmon	Mount Lemmon Survey	BAR	690 m	MPC · JPL
893522	2016 LC_{69}	—	June 4, 2016	Haleakala	Pan-STARRS 1	H	360 m	MPC · JPL
893523	2016 LK_{70}	—	June 3, 2016	Haleakala	Pan-STARRS 1	H	360 m	MPC · JPL
893524	2016 LP_{70}	—	June 5, 2016	Haleakala	Pan-STARRS 1	H	320 m	MPC · JPL
893525	2016 LX_{70}	—	June 5, 2016	Haleakala	Pan-STARRS 1	H	340 m	MPC · JPL
893526	2016 LD_{73}	—	June 7, 2016	Haleakala	Pan-STARRS 1	·	1.9 km	MPC · JPL
893527	2016 LT_{74}	—	January 20, 2009	Mount Lemmon	Mount Lemmon Survey	·	500 m	MPC · JPL
893528	2016 LZ_{76}	—	June 8, 2016	Haleakala	Pan-STARRS 1	·	620 m	MPC · JPL
893529	2016 LL_{78}	—	June 8, 2016	Haleakala	Pan-STARRS 1	·	810 m	MPC · JPL
893530	2016 LN_{86}	—	June 4, 2016	Haleakala	Pan-STARRS 1	·	1.4 km	MPC · JPL
893531	2016 LS_{86}	—	June 5, 2016	Haleakala	Pan-STARRS 1	H	390 m	MPC · JPL
893532	2016 LN_{88}	—	June 8, 2016	Haleakala	Pan-STARRS 1	·	2.0 km	MPC · JPL
893533	2016 LV_{91}	—	June 7, 2016	Haleakala	Pan-STARRS 1	·	480 m	MPC · JPL
893534	2016 LE_{93}	—	January 19, 2015	Mount Lemmon	Mount Lemmon Survey	HNS	640 m	MPC · JPL
893535	2016 LQ_{95}	—	June 8, 2016	Haleakala	Pan-STARRS 1	·	1.0 km	MPC · JPL
893536	2016 LA_{96}	—	June 7, 2016	Haleakala	Pan-STARRS 1	EUN	910 m	MPC · JPL
893537	2016 MK_{3}	—	June 29, 2016	Haleakala	Pan-STARRS 1	H	350 m	MPC · JPL
893538	2016 MD_{6}	—	June 29, 2016	Haleakala	Pan-STARRS 1	·	1.3 km	MPC · JPL
893539	2016 NV_{10}	—	December 31, 2007	Kitt Peak	Spacewatch	·	780 m	MPC · JPL
893540	2016 NN_{12}	—	June 8, 2016	Haleakala	Pan-STARRS 1	H	350 m	MPC · JPL
893541	2016 NZ_{12}	—	May 17, 2016	Haleakala	Pan-STARRS 1	H	340 m	MPC · JPL
893542	2016 NU_{20}	—	June 8, 2016	Mount Lemmon	Mount Lemmon Survey	·	1.5 km	MPC · JPL
893543	2016 NP_{22}	—	July 9, 2016	Mount Lemmon	Mount Lemmon Survey	·	1.6 km	MPC · JPL
893544	2016 NP_{57}	—	July 5, 2016	Haleakala	Pan-STARRS 1	H	440 m	MPC · JPL
893545	2016 NM_{58}	—	January 15, 2015	Haleakala	Pan-STARRS 1	H	370 m	MPC · JPL
893546	2016 NN_{64}	—	July 14, 2016	Haleakala	Pan-STARRS 1	·	880 m	MPC · JPL
893547	2016 NW_{64}	—	July 14, 2016	Haleakala	Pan-STARRS 1	·	1.1 km	MPC · JPL
893548	2016 NX_{64}	—	July 14, 2016	Haleakala	Pan-STARRS 1	DOR	1.4 km	MPC · JPL
893549	2016 NT_{76}	—	October 18, 2012	Haleakala	Pan-STARRS 1	·	1.4 km	MPC · JPL
893550	2016 NH_{78}	—	May 20, 2012	Mount Lemmon	Mount Lemmon Survey	·	820 m	MPC · JPL
893551	2016 NF_{91}	—	June 11, 2016	Mount Lemmon	Mount Lemmon Survey	H	360 m	MPC · JPL
893552	2016 NL_{92}	—	July 13, 2016	Mount Lemmon	Mount Lemmon Survey	H	360 m	MPC · JPL
893553	2016 ND_{93}	—	July 5, 2016	Mount Lemmon	Mount Lemmon Survey	·	1.0 km	MPC · JPL
893554	2016 NO_{94}	—	July 5, 2016	Haleakala	Pan-STARRS 1	H	470 m	MPC · JPL
893555	2016 NT_{94}	—	July 9, 2016	Mount Lemmon	Mount Lemmon Survey	H	370 m	MPC · JPL
893556	2016 ND_{96}	—	July 11, 2016	Haleakala	Pan-STARRS 1	·	790 m	MPC · JPL
893557	2016 NP_{97}	—	February 26, 2014	Haleakala	Pan-STARRS 1	EUN	860 m	MPC · JPL
893558	2016 NF_{101}	—	July 7, 2016	Haleakala	Pan-STARRS 1	·	1.3 km	MPC · JPL
893559	2016 NG_{101}	—	July 7, 2016	Haleakala	Pan-STARRS 1	GEF	760 m	MPC · JPL
893560	2016 NA_{103}	—	July 7, 2016	Haleakala	Pan-STARRS 1	·	1.4 km	MPC · JPL
893561	2016 NE_{104}	—	July 11, 2016	Haleakala	Pan-STARRS 1	·	1.2 km	MPC · JPL
893562	2016 NV_{106}	—	July 9, 2016	Haleakala	Pan-STARRS 1	·	1.3 km	MPC · JPL
893563	2016 NJ_{112}	—	July 7, 2016	Haleakala	Pan-STARRS 1	·	1.0 km	MPC · JPL
893564	2016 NE_{113}	—	July 14, 2016	Haleakala	Pan-STARRS 1	·	1.4 km	MPC · JPL
893565	2016 NU_{113}	—	July 14, 2016	Haleakala	Pan-STARRS 1	·	1.2 km	MPC · JPL
893566	2016 NT_{117}	—	July 14, 2016	Haleakala	Pan-STARRS 1	·	880 m	MPC · JPL
893567	2016 NA_{119}	—	July 14, 2016	Haleakala	Pan-STARRS 1	·	960 m	MPC · JPL
893568	2016 NB_{121}	—	July 11, 2016	Haleakala	Pan-STARRS 1	TIR	2.2 km	MPC · JPL
893569	2016 NF_{125}	—	July 9, 2016	Haleakala	Pan-STARRS 1	PHO	590 m	MPC · JPL
893570	2016 NT_{125}	—	July 11, 2016	Haleakala	Pan-STARRS 1	·	860 m	MPC · JPL
893571	2016 NZ_{131}	—	July 5, 2016	Haleakala	Pan-STARRS 1	·	1.3 km	MPC · JPL
893572	2016 NK_{136}	—	July 14, 2016	Haleakala	Pan-STARRS 1	GEF	790 m	MPC · JPL
893573	2016 NM_{136}	—	July 5, 2016	Mount Lemmon	Mount Lemmon Survey	·	2.0 km	MPC · JPL
893574	2016 NY_{137}	—	July 5, 2016	Haleakala	Pan-STARRS 1	H	410 m	MPC · JPL
893575	2016 NW_{150}	—	July 4, 2016	Haleakala	Pan-STARRS 1	·	1.1 km	MPC · JPL
893576	2016 NB_{153}	—	July 13, 2016	Haleakala	Pan-STARRS 1	·	1.1 km	MPC · JPL
893577	2016 NY_{154}	—	October 18, 2012	Haleakala	Pan-STARRS 1	·	1.2 km	MPC · JPL
893578	2016 NB_{156}	—	July 14, 2016	Haleakala	Pan-STARRS 1	AGN	820 m	MPC · JPL
893579	2016 NZ_{159}	—	July 7, 2016	Haleakala	Pan-STARRS 1	·	1.1 km	MPC · JPL
893580	2016 NN_{163}	—	October 26, 2008	Mount Lemmon	Mount Lemmon Survey	·	880 m	MPC · JPL
893581	2016 NT_{168}	—	July 14, 2016	Haleakala	Pan-STARRS 1	·	1.2 km	MPC · JPL
893582	2016 NM_{180}	—	July 13, 2016	Haleakala	Pan-STARRS 1	·	2.0 km	MPC · JPL
893583	2016 NV_{211}	—	September 15, 2012	Catalina	CSS	·	1.1 km	MPC · JPL
893584	2016 OS_{2}	—	July 29, 2016	WISE	WISE	·	2.1 km	MPC · JPL
893585	2016 OP_{9}	—	July 29, 2016	Haleakala	Pan-STARRS 1	H	360 m	MPC · JPL
893586	2016 OR_{9}	—	July 30, 2016	Haleakala	Pan-STARRS 1	·	920 m	MPC · JPL
893587	2016 OB_{10}	—	July 17, 2016	Haleakala	Pan-STARRS 1	·	1.3 km	MPC · JPL
893588	2016 OH_{12}	—	July 30, 2016	Haleakala	Pan-STARRS 1	KON	1.5 km	MPC · JPL
893589	2016 PP_{6}	—	February 28, 2012	Haleakala	Pan-STARRS 1	PHO	640 m	MPC · JPL
893590	2016 PM_{13}	—	August 6, 2016	Haleakala	Pan-STARRS 1	H	290 m	MPC · JPL
893591	2016 PH_{18}	—	August 7, 2016	Haleakala	Pan-STARRS 1	·	1.2 km	MPC · JPL
893592	2016 PM_{32}	—	January 27, 2015	Haleakala	Pan-STARRS 1	PHO	530 m	MPC · JPL
893593	2016 PV_{36}	—	August 7, 2016	Haleakala	Pan-STARRS 1	·	2.0 km	MPC · JPL
893594	2016 PM_{40}	—	November 22, 2014	Haleakala	Pan-STARRS 1	H	420 m	MPC · JPL
893595	2016 PX_{40}	—	July 5, 2016	Haleakala	Pan-STARRS 1	·	2.1 km	MPC · JPL
893596	2016 PQ_{46}	—	August 7, 2016	Haleakala	Pan-STARRS 1	·	880 m	MPC · JPL
893597	2016 PP_{60}	—	October 8, 2008	Kitt Peak	Spacewatch	MAR	730 m	MPC · JPL
893598	2016 PQ_{60}	—	August 7, 2016	Haleakala	Pan-STARRS 1	·	1.7 km	MPC · JPL
893599	2016 PN_{76}	—	April 25, 2015	Haleakala	Pan-STARRS 1	·	940 m	MPC · JPL
893600	2016 PX_{80}	—	August 2, 2016	Haleakala	Pan-STARRS 1	H	330 m	MPC · JPL

== 893601–893700 ==
back to top

Designation			Discovery			Properties		Ref
Permanent	Provisional	Named after	Date	Site	Discoverer(s)	Category	Diam.	Ref
893601	2016 PH_{81}	—	January 23, 2015	Haleakala	Pan-STARRS 1	H	320 m	MPC · JPL
893602	2016 PK_{81}	—	August 14, 2016	Haleakala	Pan-STARRS 1	H	380 m	MPC · JPL
893603	2016 PW_{88}	—	August 15, 2016	Haleakala	Pan-STARRS 1	·	1.1 km	MPC · JPL
893604	2016 PB_{107}	—	August 2, 2016	Haleakala	Pan-STARRS 1	MRX	700 m	MPC · JPL
893605	2016 PZ_{115}	—	October 22, 2012	Haleakala	Pan-STARRS 1	·	1.1 km	MPC · JPL
893606	2016 PS_{121}	—	August 9, 2016	Haleakala	Pan-STARRS 1	·	1.1 km	MPC · JPL
893607	2016 PX_{124}	—	November 13, 2012	ESA OGS	ESA OGS	·	840 m	MPC · JPL
893608	2016 PW_{127}	—	August 3, 2016	Haleakala	Pan-STARRS 1	·	1.6 km	MPC · JPL
893609	2016 PG_{132}	—	August 8, 2016	Haleakala	Pan-STARRS 1	·	1.5 km	MPC · JPL
893610	2016 PL_{132}	—	August 11, 2016	Haleakala	Pan-STARRS 1	·	1.3 km	MPC · JPL
893611	2016 PR_{132}	—	August 8, 2016	Haleakala	Pan-STARRS 1	·	1.1 km	MPC · JPL
893612	2016 PO_{144}	—	August 14, 2016	Haleakala	Pan-STARRS 1	H	370 m	MPC · JPL
893613	2016 PZ_{146}	—	August 9, 2016	Haleakala	Pan-STARRS 1	H	410 m	MPC · JPL
893614	2016 PK_{149}	—	August 14, 2016	Haleakala	Pan-STARRS 1	·	1.1 km	MPC · JPL
893615	2016 PZ_{151}	—	July 7, 2016	Mount Lemmon	Mount Lemmon Survey	H	390 m	MPC · JPL
893616	2016 PJ_{155}	—	August 14, 2016	Haleakala	Pan-STARRS 1	·	2.5 km	MPC · JPL
893617	2016 PW_{157}	—	August 10, 2016	Haleakala	Pan-STARRS 1	·	1.0 km	MPC · JPL
893618	2016 PC_{163}	—	August 12, 2016	Haleakala	Pan-STARRS 1	·	1.4 km	MPC · JPL
893619	2016 PT_{163}	—	August 3, 2016	Haleakala	Pan-STARRS 1	·	1.0 km	MPC · JPL
893620	2016 PW_{164}	—	August 2, 2016	Haleakala	Pan-STARRS 1	·	1.2 km	MPC · JPL
893621	2016 PG_{166}	—	August 8, 2016	Haleakala	Pan-STARRS 1	·	740 m	MPC · JPL
893622	2016 PB_{168}	—	August 2, 2016	Haleakala	Pan-STARRS 1	·	890 m	MPC · JPL
893623	2016 PZ_{168}	—	August 2, 2016	Haleakala	Pan-STARRS 1	·	880 m	MPC · JPL
893624	2016 PH_{171}	—	August 14, 2016	Haleakala	Pan-STARRS 1	GAL	1.1 km	MPC · JPL
893625	2016 PQ_{172}	—	August 2, 2016	Haleakala	Pan-STARRS 1	·	690 m	MPC · JPL
893626	2016 PA_{174}	—	August 12, 2016	Haleakala	Pan-STARRS 1	·	960 m	MPC · JPL
893627	2016 PQ_{175}	—	August 3, 2016	Haleakala	Pan-STARRS 1	EUN	690 m	MPC · JPL
893628	2016 PB_{177}	—	August 1, 2016	Haleakala	Pan-STARRS 1	·	850 m	MPC · JPL
893629	2016 PP_{177}	—	August 10, 2016	Haleakala	Pan-STARRS 1	·	770 m	MPC · JPL
893630	2016 PB_{178}	—	August 7, 2016	Haleakala	Pan-STARRS 1	·	770 m	MPC · JPL
893631	2016 PR_{183}	—	August 1, 2016	Haleakala	Pan-STARRS 1	EUN	760 m	MPC · JPL
893632	2016 PZ_{186}	—	August 8, 2016	Haleakala	Pan-STARRS 1	·	1.1 km	MPC · JPL
893633	2016 PC_{200}	—	September 15, 2012	Mount Lemmon	Mount Lemmon Survey	EUN	780 m	MPC · JPL
893634	2016 PG_{201}	—	August 3, 2016	Haleakala	Pan-STARRS 1	·	1.6 km	MPC · JPL
893635	2016 PA_{204}	—	August 3, 2016	Haleakala	Pan-STARRS 1	·	650 m	MPC · JPL
893636	2016 PN_{204}	—	August 10, 2016	Haleakala	Pan-STARRS 1	·	840 m	MPC · JPL
893637	2016 PQ_{210}	—	August 14, 2016	Haleakala	Pan-STARRS 1	·	660 m	MPC · JPL
893638	2016 PX_{218}	—	August 2, 2016	Haleakala	Pan-STARRS 1	·	1.3 km	MPC · JPL
893639	2016 PD_{223}	—	August 1, 2016	Haleakala	Pan-STARRS 1	HOF	1.6 km	MPC · JPL
893640	2016 PG_{225}	—	October 21, 2012	Haleakala	Pan-STARRS 1	·	1.1 km	MPC · JPL
893641	2016 PO_{226}	—	August 7, 2016	Haleakala	Pan-STARRS 1	·	1.4 km	MPC · JPL
893642	2016 PU_{228}	—	August 7, 2016	Haleakala	Pan-STARRS 1	·	1.2 km	MPC · JPL
893643	2016 PS_{232}	—	August 7, 2016	Haleakala	Pan-STARRS 1	EUN	760 m	MPC · JPL
893644	2016 PB_{237}	—	August 10, 2016	Haleakala	Pan-STARRS 1	·	620 m	MPC · JPL
893645	2016 PK_{237}	—	August 12, 2016	Haleakala	Pan-STARRS 1	JUN	840 m	MPC · JPL
893646	2016 PF_{239}	—	August 9, 2016	Haleakala	Pan-STARRS 1	·	860 m	MPC · JPL
893647	2016 PD_{241}	—	August 1, 2016	Haleakala	Pan-STARRS 1	·	940 m	MPC · JPL
893648	2016 PB_{242}	—	August 10, 2016	Haleakala	Pan-STARRS 1	·	910 m	MPC · JPL
893649	2016 PO_{242}	—	August 2, 2016	Haleakala	Pan-STARRS 1	·	830 m	MPC · JPL
893650	2016 PQ_{242}	—	August 9, 2016	Haleakala	Pan-STARRS 1	EUN	760 m	MPC · JPL
893651	2016 PM_{259}	—	August 7, 2016	Haleakala	Pan-STARRS 1	·	2.3 km	MPC · JPL
893652	2016 QC_{21}	—	July 9, 2016	Haleakala	Pan-STARRS 1	·	1.5 km	MPC · JPL
893653	2016 QL_{22}	—	February 16, 2015	Haleakala	Pan-STARRS 1	H	380 m	MPC · JPL
893654	2016 QN_{30}	—	August 2, 2016	Haleakala	Pan-STARRS 1	·	780 m	MPC · JPL
893655	2016 QT_{44}	—	January 14, 2015	Haleakala	Pan-STARRS 1	H	340 m	MPC · JPL
893656	2016 QP_{96}	—	August 30, 2016	Haleakala	Pan-STARRS 1	·	790 m	MPC · JPL
893657	2016 QV_{96}	—	August 30, 2016	Haleakala	Pan-STARRS 1	EUN	710 m	MPC · JPL
893658	2016 QK_{97}	—	August 29, 2016	Mount Lemmon	Mount Lemmon Survey	·	1.2 km	MPC · JPL
893659	2016 QJ_{98}	—	August 17, 2016	Haleakala	Pan-STARRS 1	JUN	690 m	MPC · JPL
893660	2016 QU_{102}	—	August 27, 2016	Haleakala	Pan-STARRS 1	·	920 m	MPC · JPL
893661	2016 QF_{103}	—	August 26, 2016	Haleakala	Pan-STARRS 1	HOF	2.1 km	MPC · JPL
893662	2016 QT_{105}	—	August 30, 2016	Mount Lemmon	Mount Lemmon Survey	·	1.1 km	MPC · JPL
893663	2016 QC_{107}	—	August 28, 2016	Mount Lemmon	Mount Lemmon Survey	·	1.3 km	MPC · JPL
893664	2016 QU_{107}	—	August 31, 2016	Sayan Solar	Karavaev, Y.	·	1.1 km	MPC · JPL
893665	2016 QW_{108}	—	August 17, 2016	Haleakala	Pan-STARRS 1	·	1 km	MPC · JPL
893666	2016 QN_{110}	—	August 17, 2016	Haleakala	Pan-STARRS 1	·	1.1 km	MPC · JPL
893667	2016 QW_{111}	—	August 30, 2016	Mount Lemmon	Mount Lemmon Survey	·	880 m	MPC · JPL
893668	2016 QZ_{111}	—	August 27, 2016	Haleakala	Pan-STARRS 1	BRG	930 m	MPC · JPL
893669	2016 QH_{112}	—	August 26, 2016	Haleakala	Pan-STARRS 1	·	770 m	MPC · JPL
893670	2016 QF_{114}	—	August 30, 2016	Haleakala	Pan-STARRS 1	·	800 m	MPC · JPL
893671	2016 QM_{114}	—	August 27, 2016	Haleakala	Pan-STARRS 1	·	800 m	MPC · JPL
893672	2016 QU_{115}	—	August 27, 2016	Haleakala	Pan-STARRS 1	·	940 m	MPC · JPL
893673	2016 QX_{115}	—	August 27, 2016	Haleakala	Pan-STARRS 1	·	1.1 km	MPC · JPL
893674	2016 QU_{116}	—	August 26, 2016	Haleakala	Pan-STARRS 1	·	700 m	MPC · JPL
893675	2016 QE_{117}	—	August 28, 2016	Mount Lemmon	Mount Lemmon Survey	HNS	710 m	MPC · JPL
893676	2016 QY_{118}	—	August 28, 2016	Mount Lemmon	Mount Lemmon Survey	·	950 m	MPC · JPL
893677	2016 QX_{128}	—	August 28, 2016	Kitt Peak	Spacewatch	H	320 m	MPC · JPL
893678	2016 QZ_{132}	—	August 30, 2016	Mount Lemmon	Mount Lemmon Survey	·	1.2 km	MPC · JPL
893679	2016 QN_{143}	—	August 3, 2016	Haleakala	Pan-STARRS 1	·	720 m	MPC · JPL
893680	2016 QD_{144}	—	August 30, 2016	Mount Lemmon	Mount Lemmon Survey	·	720 m	MPC · JPL
893681	2016 QV_{150}	—	October 7, 2012	Haleakala	Pan-STARRS 1	·	710 m	MPC · JPL
893682	2016 RE_{5}	—	July 11, 2016	Haleakala	Pan-STARRS 1	·	1.4 km	MPC · JPL
893683	2016 RX_{8}	—	September 16, 2012	Catalina	CSS	·	930 m	MPC · JPL
893684	2016 RJ_{10}	—	October 15, 2012	Mount Lemmon	Mount Lemmon Survey	·	740 m	MPC · JPL
893685	2016 RB_{14}	—	November 8, 2009	Mount Lemmon	Mount Lemmon Survey	·	690 m	MPC · JPL
893686	2016 RB_{58}	—	September 8, 2016	Haleakala	Pan-STARRS 1	·	720 m	MPC · JPL
893687	2016 RX_{58}	—	September 12, 2016	Haleakala	Pan-STARRS 1	·	1.4 km	MPC · JPL
893688	2016 RB_{63}	—	September 3, 2016	Mount Lemmon	Mount Lemmon Survey	·	990 m	MPC · JPL
893689	2016 RM_{63}	—	September 6, 2016	Mount Lemmon	Mount Lemmon Survey	·	1.2 km	MPC · JPL
893690	2016 RT_{64}	—	September 12, 2016	Mount Lemmon	Mount Lemmon Survey	·	810 m	MPC · JPL
893691	2016 RL_{65}	—	September 12, 2016	Mount Lemmon	Mount Lemmon Survey	(5)	730 m	MPC · JPL
893692	2016 RA_{66}	—	September 12, 2016	Haleakala	Pan-STARRS 1	GEF	690 m	MPC · JPL
893693	2016 RT_{67}	—	September 2, 2016	Mount Lemmon	Mount Lemmon Survey	·	950 m	MPC · JPL
893694	2016 RD_{68}	—	September 10, 2016	Mount Lemmon	Mount Lemmon Survey	·	770 m	MPC · JPL
893695	2016 RK_{69}	—	September 12, 2016	Haleakala	Pan-STARRS 1	·	830 m	MPC · JPL
893696	2016 RY_{70}	—	September 6, 2016	Mount Lemmon	Mount Lemmon Survey	·	1.2 km	MPC · JPL
893697	2016 RW_{74}	—	September 12, 2016	Haleakala	Pan-STARRS 1	·	1.5 km	MPC · JPL
893698	2016 RO_{78}	—	September 3, 2016	Mount Lemmon	Mount Lemmon Survey	H	430 m	MPC · JPL
893699	2016 RP_{78}	—	September 8, 2016	Haleakala	Pan-STARRS 1	·	1.4 km	MPC · JPL
893700	2016 RA_{86}	—	September 10, 2016	Mount Lemmon	Mount Lemmon Survey	·	1.3 km	MPC · JPL

== 893701–893800 ==
back to top

Designation			Discovery			Properties		Ref
Permanent	Provisional	Named after	Date	Site	Discoverer(s)	Category	Diam.	Ref
893701	2016 RU_{86}	—	September 10, 2016	Mount Lemmon	Mount Lemmon Survey	·	880 m	MPC · JPL
893702	2016 RY_{86}	—	September 12, 2016	Haleakala	Pan-STARRS 1	·	850 m	MPC · JPL
893703	2016 RL_{88}	—	September 8, 2016	Haleakala	Pan-STARRS 1	EUN	700 m	MPC · JPL
893704	2016 RZ_{88}	—	November 7, 2007	Kitt Peak	Spacewatch	KOR	1.0 km	MPC · JPL
893705	2016 RT_{105}	—	September 6, 2016	Haleakala	Pan-STARRS 1	·	950 m	MPC · JPL
893706	2016 SW_{2}	—	July 13, 2016	Haleakala	Pan-STARRS 1	H	460 m	MPC · JPL
893707	2016 SH_{22}	—	April 9, 2015	Mount Lemmon	Mount Lemmon Survey	PHO	750 m	MPC · JPL
893708	2016 SB_{34}	—	August 28, 2016	Mount Lemmon	Mount Lemmon Survey	AGN	900 m	MPC · JPL
893709	2016 SO_{48}	—	September 27, 2016	Haleakala	Pan-STARRS 1	·	910 m	MPC · JPL
893710	2016 SX_{52}	—	September 25, 2016	Haleakala	Pan-STARRS 1	·	1.2 km	MPC · JPL
893711	2016 SB_{55}	—	November 7, 2012	Haleakala	Pan-STARRS 1	·	800 m	MPC · JPL
893712	2016 SF_{64}	—	September 30, 2016	Haleakala	Pan-STARRS 1	3:2	3.0 km	MPC · JPL
893713	2016 SV_{64}	—	September 25, 2016	Haleakala	Pan-STARRS 1	EOS	1.4 km	MPC · JPL
893714	2016 SO_{69}	—	September 25, 2016	Haleakala	Pan-STARRS 1	(1547)	970 m	MPC · JPL
893715	2016 SW_{70}	—	September 27, 2016	Mount Lemmon	Mount Lemmon Survey	·	970 m	MPC · JPL
893716	2016 SP_{71}	—	September 25, 2016	Haleakala	Pan-STARRS 1	H	340 m	MPC · JPL
893717	2016 ST_{73}	—	September 26, 2016	Haleakala	Pan-STARRS 1	·	640 m	MPC · JPL
893718	2016 SX_{74}	—	September 30, 2016	Haleakala	Pan-STARRS 1	·	520 m	MPC · JPL
893719	2016 SP_{77}	—	September 22, 2016	Mount Lemmon	Mount Lemmon Survey	·	850 m	MPC · JPL
893720	2016 SG_{78}	—	September 21, 2016	Haleakala	Pan-STARRS 1	MAR	800 m	MPC · JPL
893721	2016 SD_{79}	—	September 25, 2016	Mount Lemmon	Mount Lemmon Survey	MAR	730 m	MPC · JPL
893722	2016 SN_{81}	—	September 27, 2016	Haleakala	Pan-STARRS 1	(5)	660 m	MPC · JPL
893723	2016 SG_{82}	—	September 25, 2016	Haleakala	Pan-STARRS 1	·	1.1 km	MPC · JPL
893724	2016 SM_{82}	—	September 30, 2016	Haleakala	Pan-STARRS 1	EUN	800 m	MPC · JPL
893725	2016 SS_{85}	—	September 25, 2016	Mount Lemmon	Mount Lemmon Survey	·	860 m	MPC · JPL
893726	2016 SF_{86}	—	September 25, 2016	Haleakala	Pan-STARRS 1	·	920 m	MPC · JPL
893727	2016 SS_{86}	—	September 22, 2016	Mount Lemmon	Mount Lemmon Survey	EUN	590 m	MPC · JPL
893728	2016 SH_{88}	—	September 30, 2016	Haleakala	Pan-STARRS 1	·	930 m	MPC · JPL
893729	2016 ST_{89}	—	September 27, 2016	Haleakala	Pan-STARRS 1	·	950 m	MPC · JPL
893730	2016 SU_{89}	—	September 25, 2016	Haleakala	Pan-STARRS 1	HNS	730 m	MPC · JPL
893731	2016 SK_{90}	—	September 26, 2016	Haleakala	Pan-STARRS 1	PHO	620 m	MPC · JPL
893732	2016 SL_{96}	—	September 25, 2016	Haleakala	Pan-STARRS 1	·	1.3 km	MPC · JPL
893733	2016 SH_{97}	—	September 25, 2016	Haleakala	Pan-STARRS 1	·	1.3 km	MPC · JPL
893734	2016 SM_{99}	—	February 2, 2009	Catalina	CSS	·	990 m	MPC · JPL
893735	2016 SL_{101}	—	September 25, 2016	Mount Lemmon	Mount Lemmon Survey	3:2	3.1 km	MPC · JPL
893736	2016 ST_{106}	—	September 30, 2016	Haleakala	Pan-STARRS 1	EUN	590 m	MPC · JPL
893737	2016 TP_{19}	—	January 18, 2015	ESA OGS	ESA OGS	H	470 m	MPC · JPL
893738	2016 TK_{26}	—	August 30, 2016	Mount Lemmon	Mount Lemmon Survey	PHO	790 m	MPC · JPL
893739	2016 TZ_{26}	—	July 15, 2013	Haleakala	Pan-STARRS 1	H	340 m	MPC · JPL
893740	2016 TH_{28}	—	November 26, 2013	Mount Lemmon	Mount Lemmon Survey	·	450 m	MPC · JPL
893741	2016 TX_{28}	—	September 10, 2016	Mount Lemmon	Mount Lemmon Survey	·	980 m	MPC · JPL
893742	2016 TY_{29}	—	October 5, 2016	Mount Lemmon	Mount Lemmon Survey	·	890 m	MPC · JPL
893743	2016 TR_{51}	—	October 7, 2016	Haleakala	Pan-STARRS 1	·	1.7 km	MPC · JPL
893744	2016 TB_{52}	—	December 13, 2012	Mount Lemmon	Mount Lemmon Survey	·	1.0 km	MPC · JPL
893745	2016 TF_{58}	—	October 1, 2016	Mount Lemmon	Mount Lemmon Survey	BRG	1.1 km	MPC · JPL
893746	2016 TK_{62}	—	March 25, 2015	Kitt Peak	Spacewatch	H	390 m	MPC · JPL
893747	2016 TG_{65}	—	October 7, 2016	Haleakala	Pan-STARRS 1	·	1.2 km	MPC · JPL
893748	2016 TY_{77}	—	August 10, 2016	Haleakala	Pan-STARRS 1	·	1.1 km	MPC · JPL
893749	2016 TW_{78}	—	October 10, 2016	Mount Lemmon	Mount Lemmon Survey	·	880 m	MPC · JPL
893750	2016 TS_{83}	—	August 27, 2016	Haleakala	Pan-STARRS 1	·	910 m	MPC · JPL
893751	2016 TS_{91}	—	October 13, 2016	Haleakala	Pan-STARRS 1	·	740 m	MPC · JPL
893752	2016 TC_{96}	—	October 4, 2016	Mount Lemmon	Mount Lemmon Survey	·	2.0 km	MPC · JPL
893753	2016 TV_{101}	—	October 10, 2016	Mount Lemmon	Mount Lemmon Survey	·	980 m	MPC · JPL
893754	2016 TG_{102}	—	October 8, 2016	Mount Lemmon	Mount Lemmon Survey	·	1.1 km	MPC · JPL
893755	2016 TM_{102}	—	October 2, 2016	Mount Lemmon	Mount Lemmon Survey	HNS	770 m	MPC · JPL
893756	2016 TF_{104}	—	October 13, 2016	Mount Lemmon	Mount Lemmon Survey	RAF	670 m	MPC · JPL
893757	2016 TH_{104}	—	October 4, 2016	Mount Lemmon	Mount Lemmon Survey	EUN	730 m	MPC · JPL
893758	2016 TJ_{105}	—	October 12, 2016	Haleakala	Pan-STARRS 1	JUN	660 m	MPC · JPL
893759	2016 TX_{107}	—	October 8, 2016	Haleakala	Pan-STARRS 1	·	980 m	MPC · JPL
893760	2016 TV_{108}	—	October 10, 2016	Mount Lemmon	Mount Lemmon Survey	·	970 m	MPC · JPL
893761	2016 TA_{109}	—	October 2, 2016	Mount Lemmon	Mount Lemmon Survey	EUN	710 m	MPC · JPL
893762	2016 TS_{109}	—	October 7, 2016	Haleakala	Pan-STARRS 1	·	820 m	MPC · JPL
893763	2016 TJ_{111}	—	October 4, 2016	XuYi	PMO NEO Survey Program	·	1.2 km	MPC · JPL
893764	2016 TV_{117}	—	October 6, 2016	Haleakala	Pan-STARRS 1	·	550 m	MPC · JPL
893765	2016 TE_{118}	—	October 9, 2016	Mount Lemmon	Mount Lemmon Survey	·	650 m	MPC · JPL
893766	2016 TF_{118}	—	October 6, 2016	Haleakala	Pan-STARRS 1	T_{j} (2.99) · 3:2	2.9 km	MPC · JPL
893767	2016 TB_{119}	—	October 9, 2016	Haleakala	Pan-STARRS 1	MAR	660 m	MPC · JPL
893768	2016 TF_{123}	—	October 12, 2016	Haleakala	Pan-STARRS 1	·	1.1 km	MPC · JPL
893769	2016 TT_{126}	—	October 7, 2016	Haleakala	Pan-STARRS 1	·	1.0 km	MPC · JPL
893770	2016 TX_{126}	—	October 5, 2016	Mount Lemmon	Mount Lemmon Survey	EUN	980 m	MPC · JPL
893771	2016 TT_{127}	—	October 10, 2016	Haleakala	Pan-STARRS 1	·	990 m	MPC · JPL
893772	2016 TZ_{127}	—	December 3, 2012	Mount Lemmon	Mount Lemmon Survey	(5)	830 m	MPC · JPL
893773	2016 TU_{128}	—	October 8, 2016	Haleakala	Pan-STARRS 1	·	1.3 km	MPC · JPL
893774	2016 TQ_{130}	—	October 7, 2016	Haleakala	Pan-STARRS 1	·	1.3 km	MPC · JPL
893775	2016 TV_{135}	—	October 7, 2016	Haleakala	Pan-STARRS 1	·	1.3 km	MPC · JPL
893776	2016 TX_{137}	—	October 10, 2016	Mount Lemmon	Mount Lemmon Survey	·	830 m	MPC · JPL
893777	2016 TN_{139}	—	October 13, 2016	Mount Lemmon	Mount Lemmon Survey	·	900 m	MPC · JPL
893778	2016 TG_{140}	—	October 10, 2016	Mount Lemmon	Mount Lemmon Survey	·	960 m	MPC · JPL
893779	2016 TJ_{140}	—	October 12, 2016	Mount Lemmon	Mount Lemmon Survey	MAR	730 m	MPC · JPL
893780	2016 TH_{141}	—	October 2, 2016	Haleakala	Pan-STARRS 1	·	1.1 km	MPC · JPL
893781	2016 TA_{142}	—	October 12, 2016	Mount Lemmon	Mount Lemmon Survey	JUN	520 m	MPC · JPL
893782	2016 TX_{142}	—	October 10, 2016	Mount Lemmon	Mount Lemmon Survey	·	790 m	MPC · JPL
893783	2016 TR_{145}	—	October 5, 2016	Mount Lemmon	Mount Lemmon Survey	·	800 m	MPC · JPL
893784	2016 TO_{146}	—	October 13, 2016	Haleakala	Pan-STARRS 1	·	1.1 km	MPC · JPL
893785	2016 TS_{146}	—	October 9, 2016	Mount Lemmon	Mount Lemmon Survey	·	940 m	MPC · JPL
893786	2016 TJ_{147}	—	October 6, 2016	Mount Lemmon	Mount Lemmon Survey	·	820 m	MPC · JPL
893787	2016 TD_{148}	—	October 9, 2016	Mount Lemmon	Mount Lemmon Survey	·	1.0 km	MPC · JPL
893788	2016 TX_{148}	—	October 7, 2016	Haleakala	Pan-STARRS 1	EUN	760 m	MPC · JPL
893789	2016 TK_{150}	—	October 13, 2016	Haleakala	Pan-STARRS 1	EUN	750 m	MPC · JPL
893790	2016 TL_{150}	—	October 1, 2016	Mount Lemmon	Mount Lemmon Survey	·	820 m	MPC · JPL
893791	2016 TF_{153}	—	October 13, 2016	Haleakala	Pan-STARRS 1	·	900 m	MPC · JPL
893792	2016 TM_{153}	—	October 12, 2016	Mount Lemmon	Mount Lemmon Survey	·	930 m	MPC · JPL
893793	2016 TO_{162}	—	October 9, 2016	Haleakala	Pan-STARRS 1	·	1.7 km	MPC · JPL
893794	2016 TX_{163}	—	October 6, 2016	Haleakala	Pan-STARRS 1	HNS	690 m	MPC · JPL
893795	2016 TO_{164}	—	October 12, 2016	Haleakala	Pan-STARRS 1	·	1.0 km	MPC · JPL
893796	2016 TT_{164}	—	October 7, 2016	Kitt Peak	Spacewatch	HOF	2.1 km	MPC · JPL
893797	2016 TB_{165}	—	October 12, 2016	Mount Lemmon	Mount Lemmon Survey	·	920 m	MPC · JPL
893798	2016 TW_{168}	—	October 12, 2016	Haleakala	Pan-STARRS 1	·	1.1 km	MPC · JPL
893799	2016 TK_{169}	—	October 7, 2016	Haleakala	Pan-STARRS 1	·	980 m	MPC · JPL
893800	2016 TZ_{169}	—	October 2, 2016	Mount Lemmon	Mount Lemmon Survey	·	1.8 km	MPC · JPL

== 893801–893900 ==
back to top

Designation			Discovery			Properties		Ref
Permanent	Provisional	Named after	Date	Site	Discoverer(s)	Category	Diam.	Ref
893801	2016 TA_{179}	—	October 13, 2016	Haleakala	Pan-STARRS 1	·	1.9 km	MPC · JPL
893802	2016 TS_{187}	—	October 7, 2016	Haleakala	Pan-STARRS 1	·	970 m	MPC · JPL
893803	2016 TD_{188}	—	October 13, 2016	Haleakala	Pan-STARRS 1	MAR	620 m	MPC · JPL
893804	2016 TS_{190}	—	October 10, 2016	Haleakala	Pan-STARRS 1	·	1.4 km	MPC · JPL
893805	2016 TC_{192}	—	October 7, 2016	Haleakala	Pan-STARRS 1	HNS	710 m	MPC · JPL
893806	2016 TX_{193}	—	October 7, 2016	Haleakala	Pan-STARRS 1	·	1.1 km	MPC · JPL
893807	2016 TB_{194}	—	October 7, 2016	Haleakala	Pan-STARRS 1	BRG	810 m	MPC · JPL
893808	2016 TY_{194}	—	October 10, 2016	Haleakala	Pan-STARRS 1	·	920 m	MPC · JPL
893809	2016 TV_{199}	—	October 7, 2016	Mount Lemmon	Mount Lemmon Survey	H	420 m	MPC · JPL
893810	2016 TH_{212}	—	October 8, 2016	Haleakala	Pan-STARRS 1	·	1.0 km	MPC · JPL
893811	2016 TE_{213}	—	October 12, 2016	Haleakala	Pan-STARRS 1	3:2	3.3 km	MPC · JPL
893812	2016 UA_{2}	—	February 19, 2015	Haleakala	Pan-STARRS 1	H	370 m	MPC · JPL
893813	2016 US_{2}	—	March 27, 2015	Haleakala	Pan-STARRS 1	H	480 m	MPC · JPL
893814	2016 UZ_{7}	—	January 16, 2013	Haleakala	Pan-STARRS 1	·	910 m	MPC · JPL
893815	2016 UO_{18}	—	October 6, 2016	Haleakala	Pan-STARRS 1	EUN	630 m	MPC · JPL
893816	2016 UP_{27}	—	October 10, 2016	Mount Lemmon	Mount Lemmon Survey	·	810 m	MPC · JPL
893817	2016 UW_{36}	—	October 2, 2016	Mount Lemmon	Mount Lemmon Survey	EOS	1.4 km	MPC · JPL
893818	2016 UK_{41}	—	December 23, 2012	Haleakala	Pan-STARRS 1	·	970 m	MPC · JPL
893819	2016 UX_{51}	—	October 25, 2016	Haleakala	Pan-STARRS 1	(5)	780 m	MPC · JPL
893820	2016 UL_{52}	—	December 24, 2013	Mount Lemmon	Mount Lemmon Survey	·	700 m	MPC · JPL
893821	2016 UZ_{53}	—	October 2, 2016	Mount Lemmon	Mount Lemmon Survey	·	970 m	MPC · JPL
893822	2016 UN_{57}	—	January 28, 2015	Haleakala	Pan-STARRS 1	H	520 m	MPC · JPL
893823	2016 UB_{61}	—	September 23, 2016	Ouka{\"\i}meden	C. Rinner, L. Blind	·	1.3 km	MPC · JPL
893824	2016 UF_{75}	—	September 30, 2016	Haleakala	Pan-STARRS 1	·	780 m	MPC · JPL
893825	2016 UZ_{78}	—	October 26, 2016	Mount Lemmon	Mount Lemmon Survey	·	940 m	MPC · JPL
893826	2016 UO_{102}	—	September 30, 2003	Kitt Peak	Spacewatch	·	800 m	MPC · JPL
893827	2016 UQ_{128}	—	November 7, 2012	Haleakala	Pan-STARRS 1	·	730 m	MPC · JPL
893828	2016 UG_{144}	—	March 21, 2015	Haleakala	Pan-STARRS 1	H	350 m	MPC · JPL
893829	2016 UF_{150}	—	October 26, 2016	Haleakala	Pan-STARRS 1	·	1.1 km	MPC · JPL
893830	2016 UK_{150}	—	October 22, 2016	Mount Lemmon	Mount Lemmon Survey	MAR	800 m	MPC · JPL
893831	2016 UL_{151}	—	October 26, 2016	Mount Lemmon	Mount Lemmon Survey	·	1.1 km	MPC · JPL
893832	2016 UR_{152}	—	October 22, 2016	Mount Lemmon	Mount Lemmon Survey	·	840 m	MPC · JPL
893833	2016 UU_{153}	—	October 29, 2016	Mount Lemmon	Mount Lemmon Survey	·	1.1 km	MPC · JPL
893834	2016 UV_{154}	—	October 21, 2016	Mount Lemmon	Mount Lemmon Survey	·	1.1 km	MPC · JPL
893835	2016 UG_{155}	—	October 28, 2016	Haleakala	Pan-STARRS 1	H	490 m	MPC · JPL
893836	2016 UM_{247}	—	October 19, 2016	Mount Lemmon	Mount Lemmon Survey	·	530 m	MPC · JPL
893837	2016 UT_{252}	—	October 21, 2016	Mount Lemmon	Mount Lemmon Survey	EUN	710 m	MPC · JPL
893838	2016 UJ_{254}	—	October 25, 2016	Haleakala	Pan-STARRS 1	·	930 m	MPC · JPL
893839	2016 UT_{254}	—	October 23, 2016	Mount Lemmon	Mount Lemmon Survey	EUN	820 m	MPC · JPL
893840	2016 UD_{255}	—	October 26, 2016	Kitt Peak	Spacewatch	·	1.1 km	MPC · JPL
893841	2016 UQ_{255}	—	October 28, 2016	Haleakala	Pan-STARRS 1	·	920 m	MPC · JPL
893842	2016 UX_{257}	—	October 26, 2016	Kitt Peak	Spacewatch	·	1.0 km	MPC · JPL
893843	2016 UG_{258}	—	October 29, 2016	Mount Lemmon	Mount Lemmon Survey	·	1.1 km	MPC · JPL
893844	2016 UV_{258}	—	October 25, 2016	Haleakala	Pan-STARRS 1	EUN	760 m	MPC · JPL
893845	2016 UX_{258}	—	October 25, 2016	Haleakala	Pan-STARRS 1	·	780 m	MPC · JPL
893846	2016 UT_{259}	—	October 28, 2016	Haleakala	Pan-STARRS 1	·	1.0 km	MPC · JPL
893847	2016 UU_{260}	—	October 19, 2016	Mount Lemmon	Mount Lemmon Survey	·	770 m	MPC · JPL
893848	2016 US_{261}	—	October 31, 2016	Mount Lemmon	Mount Lemmon Survey	·	910 m	MPC · JPL
893849	2016 UL_{262}	—	October 29, 2016	Mount Lemmon	Mount Lemmon Survey	·	1.2 km	MPC · JPL
893850	2016 UY_{265}	—	October 28, 2016	Haleakala	Pan-STARRS 1	HNS	580 m	MPC · JPL
893851	2016 UF_{266}	—	October 31, 2016	Mount Lemmon	Mount Lemmon Survey	·	850 m	MPC · JPL
893852	2016 UV_{268}	—	October 28, 2016	Haleakala	Pan-STARRS 1	ADE	1.1 km	MPC · JPL
893853	2016 UP_{274}	—	October 25, 2016	Haleakala	Pan-STARRS 1	·	760 m	MPC · JPL
893854	2016 UF_{277}	—	October 30, 2016	Mount Lemmon	Mount Lemmon Survey	·	2.0 km	MPC · JPL
893855	2016 UB_{280}	—	October 26, 2016	Haleakala	Pan-STARRS 1	HNS	800 m	MPC · JPL
893856	2016 UF_{284}	—	October 28, 2016	Haleakala	Pan-STARRS 1	·	980 m	MPC · JPL
893857	2016 UR_{297}	—	January 6, 2013	Kitt Peak	Spacewatch	·	1.3 km	MPC · JPL
893858	2016 UJ_{304}	—	October 25, 2016	Haleakala	Pan-STARRS 1	·	850 m	MPC · JPL
893859	2016 VO_{1}	—	October 30, 2016	Space Surveillance	Space Surveillance Telescope	ATE	80 m	MPC · JPL
893860	2016 VQ_{3}	—	May 13, 2016	Haleakala	Pan-STARRS 1	·	1.3 km	MPC · JPL
893861	2016 VN_{7}	—	August 29, 2016	Mount Lemmon	Mount Lemmon Survey	·	920 m	MPC · JPL
893862	2016 VD_{12}	—	September 12, 2016	Haleakala	Pan-STARRS 1	·	990 m	MPC · JPL
893863	2016 VJ_{22}	—	November 4, 2016	Haleakala	Pan-STARRS 1	·	1.4 km	MPC · JPL
893864	2016 VK_{23}	—	November 10, 2016	Haleakala	Pan-STARRS 1	·	1.1 km	MPC · JPL
893865	2016 VP_{24}	—	November 10, 2016	Haleakala	Pan-STARRS 1	·	1.0 km	MPC · JPL
893866	2016 VV_{24}	—	November 10, 2016	Haleakala	Pan-STARRS 1	HNS	780 m	MPC · JPL
893867	2016 VA_{25}	—	November 3, 2016	Haleakala	Pan-STARRS 1	MAR	670 m	MPC · JPL
893868	2016 VE_{28}	—	November 6, 2016	Mount Lemmon	Mount Lemmon Survey	·	880 m	MPC · JPL
893869	2016 VE_{30}	—	November 1, 2016	Calar Alto	S. Hellmich, S. Mottola	·	1.1 km	MPC · JPL
893870	2016 VF_{37}	—	November 5, 2016	Mount Lemmon	Mount Lemmon Survey	·	800 m	MPC · JPL
893871	2016 VG_{37}	—	November 6, 2016	Mount Lemmon	Mount Lemmon Survey	EUN	750 m	MPC · JPL
893872	2016 VJ_{37}	—	November 4, 2016	Haleakala	Pan-STARRS 1	·	940 m	MPC · JPL
893873	2016 VD_{38}	—	November 3, 2016	Haleakala	Pan-STARRS 1	HNS	670 m	MPC · JPL
893874	2016 VQ_{40}	—	November 5, 2016	Mount Lemmon	Mount Lemmon Survey	·	710 m	MPC · JPL
893875	2016 VC_{41}	—	November 10, 2016	Haleakala	Pan-STARRS 1	EUN	760 m	MPC · JPL
893876	2016 VF_{42}	—	November 4, 2016	Haleakala	Pan-STARRS 1	·	900 m	MPC · JPL
893877	2016 VC_{43}	—	November 9, 2016	Mount Lemmon	Mount Lemmon Survey	·	1.1 km	MPC · JPL
893878	2016 VP_{44}	—	October 27, 2008	Mount Lemmon	Mount Lemmon Survey	3:2	3.0 km	MPC · JPL
893879	2016 VK_{45}	—	November 6, 2016	Kitt Peak	Spacewatch	·	1.2 km	MPC · JPL
893880	2016 VM_{45}	—	November 10, 2016	Haleakala	Pan-STARRS 1	·	1.1 km	MPC · JPL
893881	2016 VW_{46}	—	November 4, 2016	Haleakala	Pan-STARRS 1	KON	1.5 km	MPC · JPL
893882	2016 VM_{48}	—	November 4, 2016	Haleakala	Pan-STARRS 1	·	1.1 km	MPC · JPL
893883	2016 VK_{49}	—	November 10, 2016	Mount Lemmon	Mount Lemmon Survey	·	890 m	MPC · JPL
893884	2016 VO_{52}	—	November 5, 2016	Mount Lemmon	Mount Lemmon Survey	KON	1.3 km	MPC · JPL
893885	2016 VK_{56}	—	November 8, 2016	Haleakala	Pan-STARRS 1	THB	2.1 km	MPC · JPL
893886	2016 VZ_{56}	—	November 10, 2016	Haleakala	Pan-STARRS 1	·	1.7 km	MPC · JPL
893887	2016 VX_{59}	—	November 5, 2016	Haleakala	Pan-STARRS 1	·	780 m	MPC · JPL
893888	2016 VZ_{59}	—	November 11, 2016	Mount Lemmon	Mount Lemmon Survey	·	1.1 km	MPC · JPL
893889	2016 VR_{60}	—	November 6, 2016	Kitt Peak	Spacewatch	·	1.1 km	MPC · JPL
893890	2016 VE_{62}	—	April 8, 2014	Mount Lemmon	Mount Lemmon Survey	HNS	810 m	MPC · JPL
893891	2016 WC_{4}	—	November 9, 2016	Mount Lemmon	Mount Lemmon Survey	·	890 m	MPC · JPL
893892	2016 WX_{5}	—	October 26, 2016	Mount Lemmon	Mount Lemmon Survey	·	820 m	MPC · JPL
893893	2016 WV_{26}	—	November 23, 2016	Mount Lemmon	Mount Lemmon Survey	·	940 m	MPC · JPL
893894	2016 WC_{27}	—	October 26, 2016	Haleakala	Pan-STARRS 1	(5)	950 m	MPC · JPL
893895	2016 WY_{31}	—	November 6, 2016	Mount Lemmon	Mount Lemmon Survey	·	950 m	MPC · JPL
893896	2016 WT_{32}	—	October 7, 2016	Haleakala	Pan-STARRS 1	·	1.0 km	MPC · JPL
893897	2016 WC_{36}	—	October 10, 2016	Haleakala	Pan-STARRS 1	·	1.2 km	MPC · JPL
893898	2016 WO_{51}	—	October 13, 2016	Haleakala	Pan-STARRS 1	·	940 m	MPC · JPL
893899	2016 WN_{52}	—	November 11, 2016	Mount Lemmon	Mount Lemmon Survey	·	1.5 km	MPC · JPL
893900	2016 WY_{58}	—	November 28, 2016	Haleakala	Pan-STARRS 1	·	1.4 km	MPC · JPL

== 893901–894000 ==
back to top

Designation			Discovery			Properties		Ref
Permanent	Provisional	Named after	Date	Site	Discoverer(s)	Category	Diam.	Ref
893901	2016 WE_{59}	—	November 30, 2016	Mount Lemmon	Mount Lemmon Survey	·	890 m	MPC · JPL
893902	2016 WH_{59}	—	November 28, 2016	Haleakala	Pan-STARRS 1	BRA	1.1 km	MPC · JPL
893903	2016 WA_{60}	—	November 26, 2016	Haleakala	Pan-STARRS 1	·	370 m	MPC · JPL
893904	2016 WS_{64}	—	December 9, 2012	Mount Lemmon	Mount Lemmon Survey	·	1.1 km	MPC · JPL
893905	2016 WU_{64}	—	November 28, 2016	Haleakala	Pan-STARRS 1	·	1.6 km	MPC · JPL
893906	2016 WQ_{66}	—	November 19, 2016	Mount Lemmon	Mount Lemmon Survey	·	970 m	MPC · JPL
893907	2016 WW_{66}	—	November 19, 2016	Mount Lemmon	Mount Lemmon Survey	·	1.1 km	MPC · JPL
893908	2016 WU_{67}	—	January 15, 2013	Catalina	CSS	·	1.1 km	MPC · JPL
893909	2016 WV_{67}	—	November 28, 2016	Haleakala	Pan-STARRS 1	·	750 m	MPC · JPL
893910	2016 WG_{68}	—	November 29, 2016	ESA OGS	ESA OGS	EUN	720 m	MPC · JPL
893911	2016 WH_{68}	—	November 25, 2016	Mount Lemmon	Mount Lemmon Survey	·	840 m	MPC · JPL
893912	2016 WE_{69}	—	November 25, 2016	Mount Lemmon	Mount Lemmon Survey	·	770 m	MPC · JPL
893913	2016 WT_{70}	—	November 30, 2016	Mount Lemmon	Mount Lemmon Survey	·	1.3 km	MPC · JPL
893914	2016 WQ_{71}	—	November 19, 2016	Mount Lemmon	Mount Lemmon Survey	·	2.5 km	MPC · JPL
893915	2016 WN_{73}	—	November 28, 2016	Haleakala	Pan-STARRS 1	·	1.1 km	MPC · JPL
893916	2016 WO_{75}	—	November 25, 2016	Mount Lemmon	Mount Lemmon Survey	·	1.0 km	MPC · JPL
893917	2016 WE_{77}	—	November 30, 2016	Mount Lemmon	Mount Lemmon Survey	·	2.4 km	MPC · JPL
893918	2016 WX_{78}	—	November 30, 2016	Mount Lemmon	Mount Lemmon Survey	·	1.4 km	MPC · JPL
893919	2016 WO_{79}	—	November 23, 2016	Mount Lemmon	Mount Lemmon Survey	HNS	790 m	MPC · JPL
893920	2016 WD_{80}	—	November 23, 2016	Mount Lemmon	Mount Lemmon Survey	EUN	1.1 km	MPC · JPL
893921	2016 WF_{80}	—	October 29, 2016	Mount Lemmon	Mount Lemmon Survey	·	1.0 km	MPC · JPL
893922	2016 XC_{4}	—	October 26, 2016	Kitt Peak	Spacewatch	JUN	700 m	MPC · JPL
893923	2016 XD_{7}	—	November 9, 2016	Mount Lemmon	Mount Lemmon Survey	·	980 m	MPC · JPL
893924	2016 XG_{9}	—	November 11, 2016	Mount Lemmon	Mount Lemmon Survey	·	1.6 km	MPC · JPL
893925	2016 XT_{14}	—	November 27, 2006	Mount Lemmon	Mount Lemmon Survey	·	1.3 km	MPC · JPL
893926	2016 XY_{15}	—	October 9, 2016	Kitt Peak	Spacewatch	KON	1.8 km	MPC · JPL
893927	2016 XY_{19}	—	November 23, 2016	Mount Lemmon	Mount Lemmon Survey	EUN	810 m	MPC · JPL
893928	2016 XD_{21}	—	July 7, 2016	Mount Lemmon	Mount Lemmon Survey	BAR	770 m	MPC · JPL
893929	2016 XM_{27}	—	December 1, 2016	Mount Lemmon	Mount Lemmon Survey	·	1.2 km	MPC · JPL
893930	2016 XG_{29}	—	December 8, 2016	Mount Lemmon	Mount Lemmon Survey	JUN	750 m	MPC · JPL
893931	2016 XJ_{29}	—	December 1, 2016	Mount Lemmon	Mount Lemmon Survey	·	990 m	MPC · JPL
893932	2016 XS_{29}	—	December 8, 2016	Mount Lemmon	Mount Lemmon Survey	·	1.2 km	MPC · JPL
893933	2016 XT_{29}	—	December 8, 2016	Mount Lemmon	Mount Lemmon Survey	·	1.1 km	MPC · JPL
893934	2016 XU_{29}	—	December 10, 2016	Mount Lemmon	Mount Lemmon Survey	·	1.2 km	MPC · JPL
893935	2016 XL_{30}	—	December 10, 2016	Mount Lemmon	Mount Lemmon Survey	·	1.1 km	MPC · JPL
893936	2016 XA_{31}	—	December 10, 2016	Mount Lemmon	Mount Lemmon Survey	·	1.1 km	MPC · JPL
893937	2016 XJ_{31}	—	December 10, 2016	Mount Lemmon	Mount Lemmon Survey	BAR	730 m	MPC · JPL
893938	2016 XF_{32}	—	December 1, 2016	Mount Lemmon	Mount Lemmon Survey	·	880 m	MPC · JPL
893939	2016 XY_{32}	—	December 10, 2016	Mount Lemmon	Mount Lemmon Survey	·	1.1 km	MPC · JPL
893940	2016 XT_{33}	—	December 5, 2016	Mount Lemmon	Mount Lemmon Survey	GAL	1.3 km	MPC · JPL
893941	2016 XE_{37}	—	December 4, 2016	Mount Lemmon	Mount Lemmon Survey	·	1.7 km	MPC · JPL
893942	2016 XB_{38}	—	December 6, 2016	Mount Lemmon	Mount Lemmon Survey	·	1.1 km	MPC · JPL
893943	2016 XO_{38}	—	December 5, 2016	Mount Lemmon	Mount Lemmon Survey	(1547)	1.2 km	MPC · JPL
893944	2016 XQ_{38}	—	December 9, 2016	Mount Lemmon	Mount Lemmon Survey	HNS	790 m	MPC · JPL
893945	2016 XR_{38}	—	December 9, 2016	Mount Lemmon	Mount Lemmon Survey	HNS	860 m	MPC · JPL
893946	2016 XD_{39}	—	December 5, 2016	Mount Lemmon	Mount Lemmon Survey	·	580 m	MPC · JPL
893947	2016 XP_{40}	—	December 8, 2016	Mount Lemmon	Mount Lemmon Survey	·	2.4 km	MPC · JPL
893948	2016 YC_{9}	—	December 8, 2016	Mount Lemmon	Mount Lemmon Survey	·	1.1 km	MPC · JPL
893949	2016 YW_{14}	—	December 18, 2016	Mount Lemmon	Mount Lemmon Survey	·	1.5 km	MPC · JPL
893950	2016 YK_{15}	—	December 23, 2016	Haleakala	Pan-STARRS 1	JUN	780 m	MPC · JPL
893951	2016 YN_{15}	—	December 23, 2016	Haleakala	Pan-STARRS 1	·	630 m	MPC · JPL
893952	2016 YV_{16}	—	December 23, 2016	Haleakala	Pan-STARRS 1	HNS	770 m	MPC · JPL
893953	2016 YU_{19}	—	December 24, 2016	Haleakala	Pan-STARRS 1	EUN	830 m	MPC · JPL
893954	2016 YV_{20}	—	December 27, 2016	Mount Lemmon	Mount Lemmon Survey	EOS	1.5 km	MPC · JPL
893955	2016 YS_{21}	—	December 19, 2016	Mount Lemmon	Mount Lemmon Survey	·	1.3 km	MPC · JPL
893956	2016 YT_{22}	—	December 27, 2016	Mount Lemmon	Mount Lemmon Survey	·	1.3 km	MPC · JPL
893957	2016 YM_{23}	—	December 23, 2016	Haleakala	Pan-STARRS 1	·	1.0 km	MPC · JPL
893958	2016 YP_{23}	—	December 30, 2016	Mount Lemmon	Mount Lemmon Survey	·	1.1 km	MPC · JPL
893959	2016 YG_{24}	—	December 23, 2016	Haleakala	Pan-STARRS 1	·	1.2 km	MPC · JPL
893960	2016 YD_{25}	—	December 23, 2016	Haleakala	Pan-STARRS 1	·	1.4 km	MPC · JPL
893961	2016 YY_{25}	—	December 23, 2016	Haleakala	Pan-STARRS 1	·	1.2 km	MPC · JPL
893962	2016 YP_{27}	—	December 23, 2016	Haleakala	Pan-STARRS 1	EUN	800 m	MPC · JPL
893963	2016 YZ_{33}	—	December 24, 2016	Haleakala	Pan-STARRS 1	·	1.3 km	MPC · JPL
893964	2016 YL_{34}	—	December 24, 2016	Haleakala	Pan-STARRS 1	·	1.3 km	MPC · JPL
893965	2016 YR_{34}	—	November 8, 2007	Mount Lemmon	Mount Lemmon Survey	·	1.3 km	MPC · JPL
893966	2016 YO_{35}	—	December 23, 2016	Haleakala	Pan-STARRS 1	·	1.4 km	MPC · JPL
893967	2016 YB_{36}	—	December 23, 2016	Haleakala	Pan-STARRS 1	EUN	740 m	MPC · JPL
893968	2017 AO_{1}	—	January 2, 2017	Haleakala	Pan-STARRS 1	·	1 km	MPC · JPL
893969	2017 AK_{2}	—	October 8, 2015	Mount Lemmon	Mount Lemmon Survey	·	1.2 km	MPC · JPL
893970	2017 AC_{8}	—	October 25, 2011	Haleakala	Pan-STARRS 1	·	1.0 km	MPC · JPL
893971	2017 AH_{14}	—	November 5, 2010	Mount Lemmon	Mount Lemmon Survey	·	1.9 km	MPC · JPL
893972	2017 AO_{15}	—	September 23, 2011	Haleakala	Pan-STARRS 1	·	1.0 km	MPC · JPL
893973	2017 AJ_{18}	—	January 7, 2017	Mount Lemmon	Mount Lemmon Survey	·	1.5 km	MPC · JPL
893974	2017 AT_{18}	—	October 24, 2011	Haleakala	Pan-STARRS 1	·	1.2 km	MPC · JPL
893975	2017 AK_{25}	—	January 2, 2017	Haleakala	Pan-STARRS 1	·	1.4 km	MPC · JPL
893976	2017 AR_{25}	—	January 4, 2017	Haleakala	Pan-STARRS 1	·	1.4 km	MPC · JPL
893977	2017 AT_{25}	—	January 3, 2017	Haleakala	Pan-STARRS 1	·	1.9 km	MPC · JPL
893978	2017 AH_{27}	—	January 4, 2017	Haleakala	Pan-STARRS 1	·	1.2 km	MPC · JPL
893979	2017 AD_{28}	—	January 4, 2017	Haleakala	Pan-STARRS 1	·	890 m	MPC · JPL
893980	2017 AR_{28}	—	January 2, 2017	Haleakala	Pan-STARRS 1	·	770 m	MPC · JPL
893981	2017 AX_{28}	—	January 2, 2017	Haleakala	Pan-STARRS 1	·	920 m	MPC · JPL
893982	2017 AH_{32}	—	January 3, 2017	Haleakala	Pan-STARRS 1	HNS	700 m	MPC · JPL
893983	2017 AK_{33}	—	January 2, 2017	Haleakala	Pan-STARRS 1	·	1.4 km	MPC · JPL
893984	2017 AN_{36}	—	December 16, 2007	Kitt Peak	Spacewatch	·	1.5 km	MPC · JPL
893985	2017 AD_{38}	—	January 5, 2017	Mount Lemmon	Mount Lemmon Survey	JUN	650 m	MPC · JPL
893986	2017 AC_{40}	—	January 5, 2017	Mount Lemmon	Mount Lemmon Survey	·	950 m	MPC · JPL
893987	2017 AD_{40}	—	January 7, 2017	Mount Lemmon	Mount Lemmon Survey	·	1.2 km	MPC · JPL
893988	2017 AU_{40}	—	January 2, 2017	Haleakala	Pan-STARRS 1	·	1.3 km	MPC · JPL
893989	2017 AF_{41}	—	January 4, 2017	Haleakala	Pan-STARRS 1	·	1.5 km	MPC · JPL
893990	2017 AA_{42}	—	January 3, 2017	Haleakala	Pan-STARRS 1	MAR	670 m	MPC · JPL
893991	2017 AN_{43}	—	January 5, 2017	Mount Lemmon	Mount Lemmon Survey	·	1.3 km	MPC · JPL
893992	2017 AP_{43}	—	January 3, 2017	Haleakala	Pan-STARRS 1	·	1.2 km	MPC · JPL
893993	2017 AQ_{43}	—	January 5, 2017	Mount Lemmon	Mount Lemmon Survey	·	1.1 km	MPC · JPL
893994	2017 AX_{43}	—	January 3, 2017	Haleakala	Pan-STARRS 1	·	1.4 km	MPC · JPL
893995	2017 AU_{44}	—	January 3, 2017	Haleakala	Pan-STARRS 1	EUN	750 m	MPC · JPL
893996	2017 AW_{44}	—	January 7, 2017	Mount Lemmon	Mount Lemmon Survey	·	2.4 km	MPC · JPL
893997	2017 AC_{45}	—	January 3, 2017	Haleakala	Pan-STARRS 1	·	740 m	MPC · JPL
893998	2017 AH_{46}	—	January 2, 2017	Haleakala	Pan-STARRS 1	·	2.2 km	MPC · JPL
893999	2017 AX_{49}	—	January 3, 2017	Haleakala	Pan-STARRS 1	·	710 m	MPC · JPL
894000	2017 AG_{51}	—	January 3, 2017	Haleakala	Pan-STARRS 1	·	2.0 km	MPC · JPL

back to top

== See also ==
- Meanings of minor-planet names: 893001–894000
