= Planetary symbols =

Graphical symbols used in astrology and astronomy

Planetary symbols are used in astrology and traditionally in astronomy to represent a classical planet (which includes the Sun and the Moon) or one of the modern planets. The classical symbols were also used in alchemy for the seven metals known to the ancients, which were associated with the planets, and in calendars for the seven days of the week associated with the seven planets. The original symbols date to Greco-Roman astronomy; their modern forms developed in the 16th century, and additional symbols would be created later for newly discovered planets.

The seven classical planets, their symbols, days and most commonly associated planetary metals are:

Planet	Moon	Mercury	Venus	Sun	Mars	Jupiter	Saturn
Symbol	☾	☿	♀	☉	♂	♃	♄
Unicode	U+263E ☾	U+263F ☿	U+2640 ♀	U+2609 ☉	U+2642 ♂	U+2643 ♃	U+2644 ♄
Day	Monday	Wednesday	Friday	Sunday	Tuesday	Thursday	Saturday
Metal	Silver	Quicksilver (Mercury)	Copper	Gold	Iron	Tin	Lead

The International Astronomical Union (IAU) discourages the use of these symbols in modern journal articles, and their style manual proposes one- and two-letter abbreviations for the names of the planets for cases where planetary symbols might be used, such as in the headings of tables. The modern planets with their traditional symbols and IAU abbreviations are:

Planet	Mercury	Venus	Earth	Mars	Jupiter	Saturn	Uranus	Neptune
Symbol	☿	♀	🜨	♂	♃	♄	⛢	♆
Unicode	U+263F ☿	U+2640 ♀	U+1F728 🜨	U+2642 ♂	U+2643 ♃	U+2644 ♄	U+26E2 ⛢	U+2646 ♆
Initial (IAU)	Me, H (Note: In order to have one-letter abbreviations for every planet, the IAU recommends 'H' (Hermes) for Mercury and 'M' for Mars. In the unlikely event a satellite were ever discovered around Mercury, its official abbreviation would be H1.)	V	E	Ma, M	J	S	U	N

The symbols of Venus and Mars are used to represent female and male in biology, following a convention introduced by Carl Linnaeus in the 1750s.

== History ==
=== Classical planets ===
The origins of the planetary symbols can be found in the attributes given to classical deities. The Roman planisphere of Bianchini (2nd century, currently in the Louvre, inv. Ma 540) shows the seven planets represented by portraits of the seven corresponding gods, each a bust with a halo and an iconic object or dress, as follows: Mercury has a caduceus and a winged cap; Venus has a necklace and a shining mirror; Mars has a war-helmet and a spear; Jupiter has a laurel crown and a staff; Saturn has a conical headdress and a scythe; the Sun has rays emanating from his head; and the Moon has a crescent atop her head.

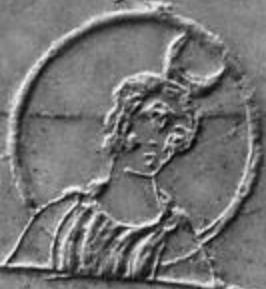
Luna with a crescent

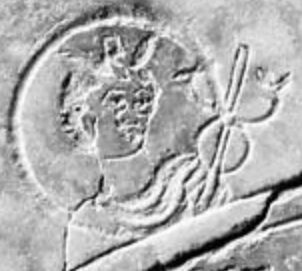
Mercury with a caduceus

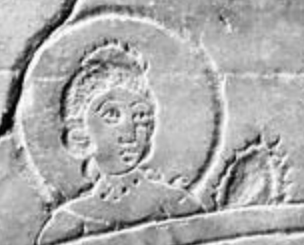
Venus with a shining mirror

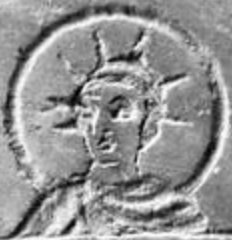
Sol emanating rays

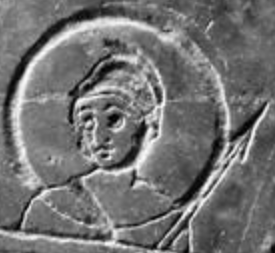
Mars with a spear

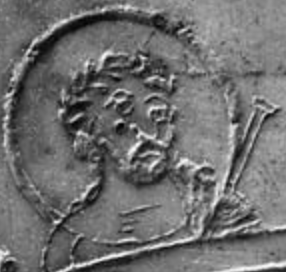
Jupiter with a staff

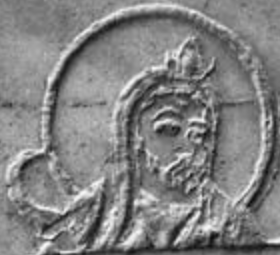
Saturn with a scythe

The written symbols for Mercury, Venus, Jupiter, and Saturn have been traced to forms found in late Greek papyri. (Note: "It is now possible to trace the medieval symbols for at least four of the five planets to forms that occur in some of the latest papyrus horoscopes ([ P.Oxy. ] 4272, 4274, 4275 [...]). Mercury's is a stylized caduceus. ... The ideal form of Mars' symbol is uncertain, and perhaps not related to the later circle with an arrow through it." — Jones (1999))

Early forms are also found in medieval Byzantine codices which preserve horoscopes.

The symbol for the Moon in a medieval Byzantine (11th c.) ms. The appearance in late Classical times was similar.

The symbol for Mercury in late Classical (4th c.) and medieval Byzantine (11th c.) mss

The symbol for Venus in late Classical (4th c.) and medieval Byzantine (11th c.) mss

The disk with a ray as a symbol for the Sun in late Classical (4th c.) and medieval Byzantine (11th c.) mss

The symbol for Mars in late Classical (6th c.) and medieval Byzantine (11th c.) mss.

The symbol for Jupiter in late Classical (4th c.) and medieval Byzantine (11th c.) mss

The symbol for Saturn in late Classical (4th & 5th c.) and medieval Byzantine (11th c.) mss. Cf. kappa-rho, ⟨κρ⟩.

A diagram in the astronomical compendium by Johannes Kamateros (12th century) closely resembles the 11th-century forms shown above, with the Sun represented by a circle with a single ray, Jupiter by the letter zeta (the initial of Zeus, Jupiter's counterpart in Greek mythology), Mars by a round shield in front of a diagonal spear, and the remaining classical planets by symbols resembling the modern ones, though without the crosses seen in modern versions of Mercury, Venus, Jupiter and Saturn. These crosses first appear in the late 15th or early 16th century. According to Maunder, the addition of crosses appears to be "an attempt to give a savour of Christianity to the symbols of the old pagan gods." The modern forms of the classical planetary symbols are found in a woodcut of the seven planets in a Latin translation of Abu Ma'shar al-Balkhi's De Magnis Coniunctionibus printed at Venice in 1506, represented as the corresponding gods riding chariots.

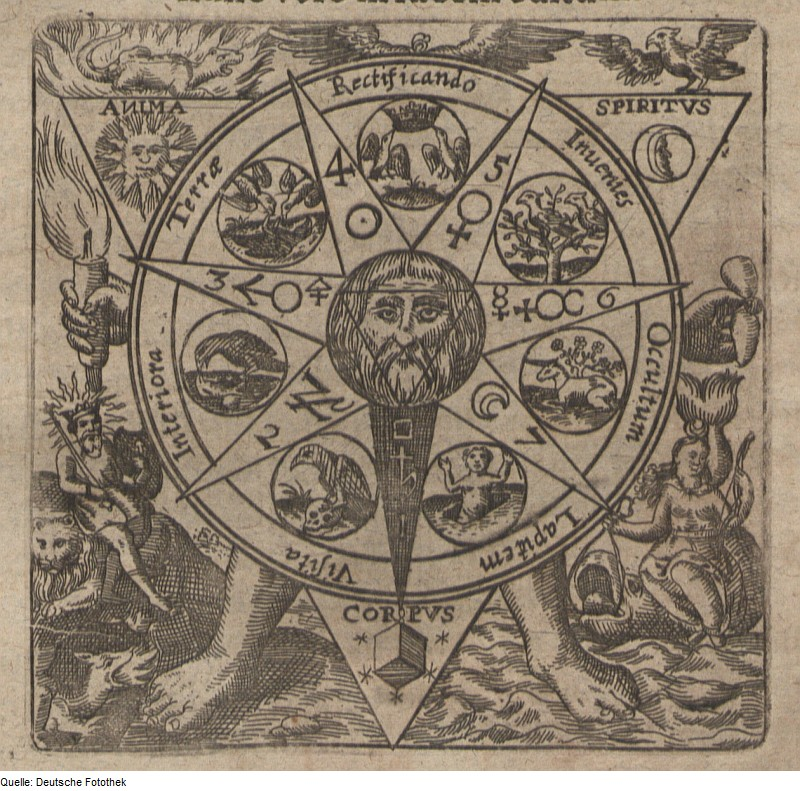
Early modern depiction of the planet symbols in an alchemical context (Musaeum Hermeticum, 1678)

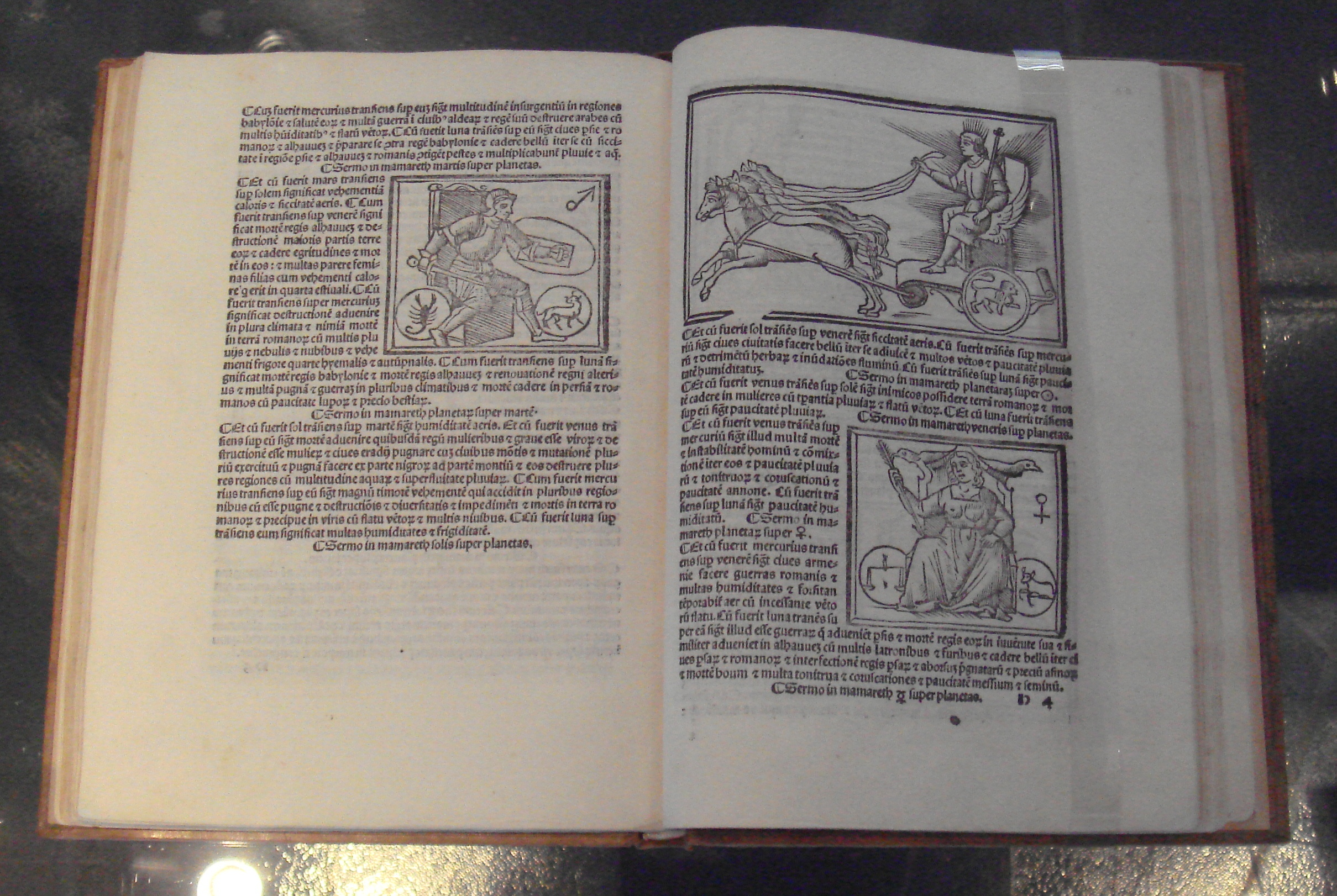
Page spread (with the signs for Mars and Venus) from a 1515 illustrated edition of Abu Ma'shar al-Balkhi's De Magnis Coniunctionibus (in the by translation by Herman of Carinthia, c. 1140, editio princeps by Erhard Ratdolt of Augsburg, 1489).

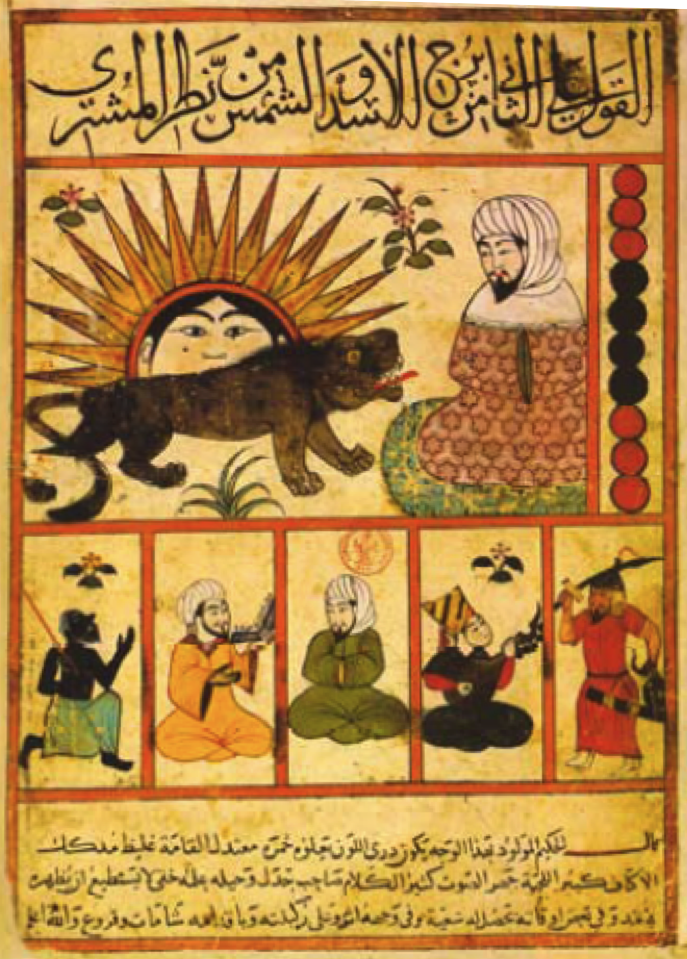
Depiction of the planets in a 15th-century Arabic manuscript of Abu Ma'shar's "Book of nativities" (Note: BNF Arabe 2583 folio 15v: Saturn is shown as a black bearded man, kneeling and holding a scythe or axe; Mercury is shown as a scribe holding an open codex; Jupiter as a man of the law wearing a turban; Venus as a lute-player; Mars as a helmeted warrior holding a sword and the head of an enemy.)

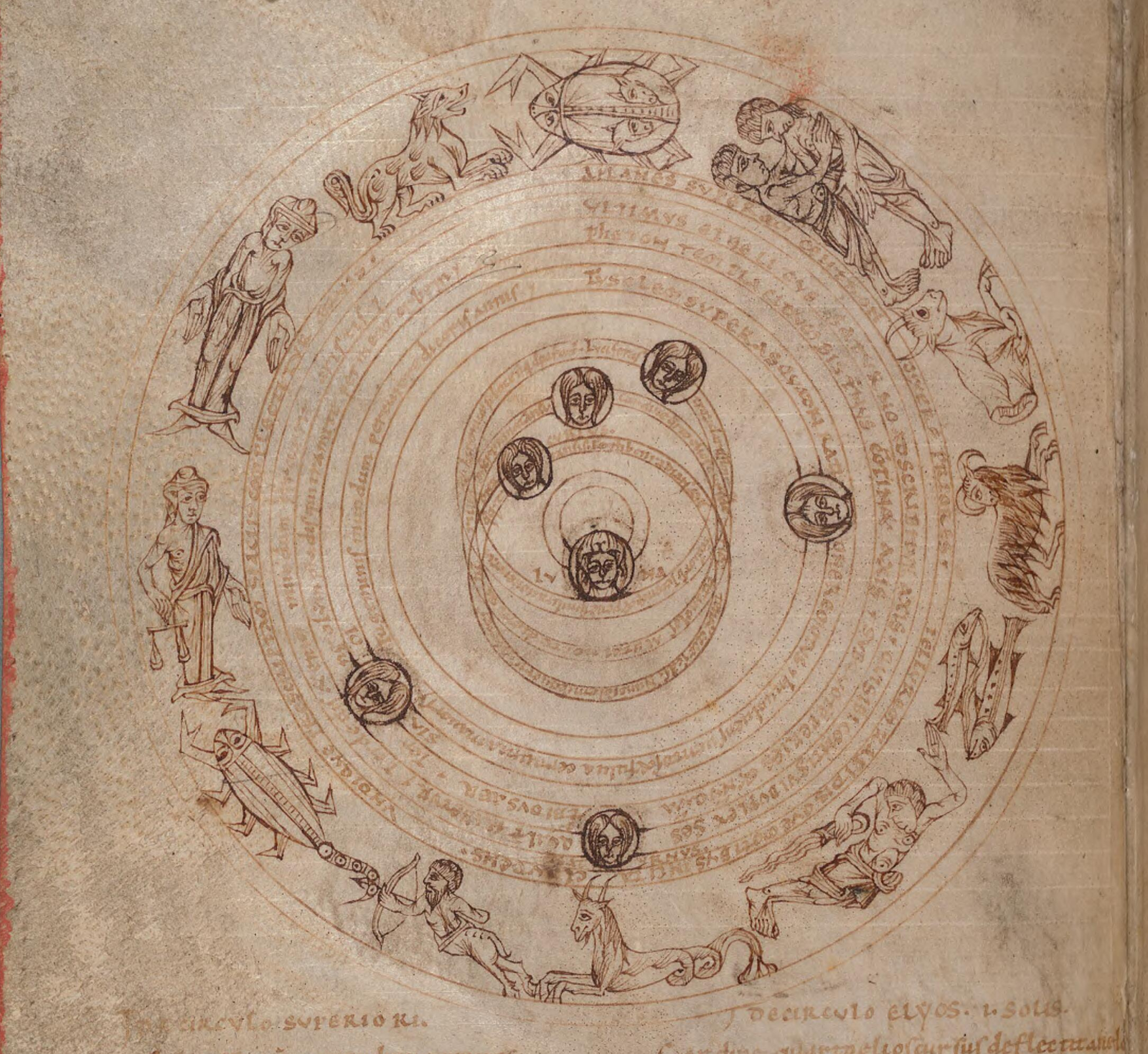
Medieval planisphere showing the zodiac and the classical planets. The planets are represented by seven faces.

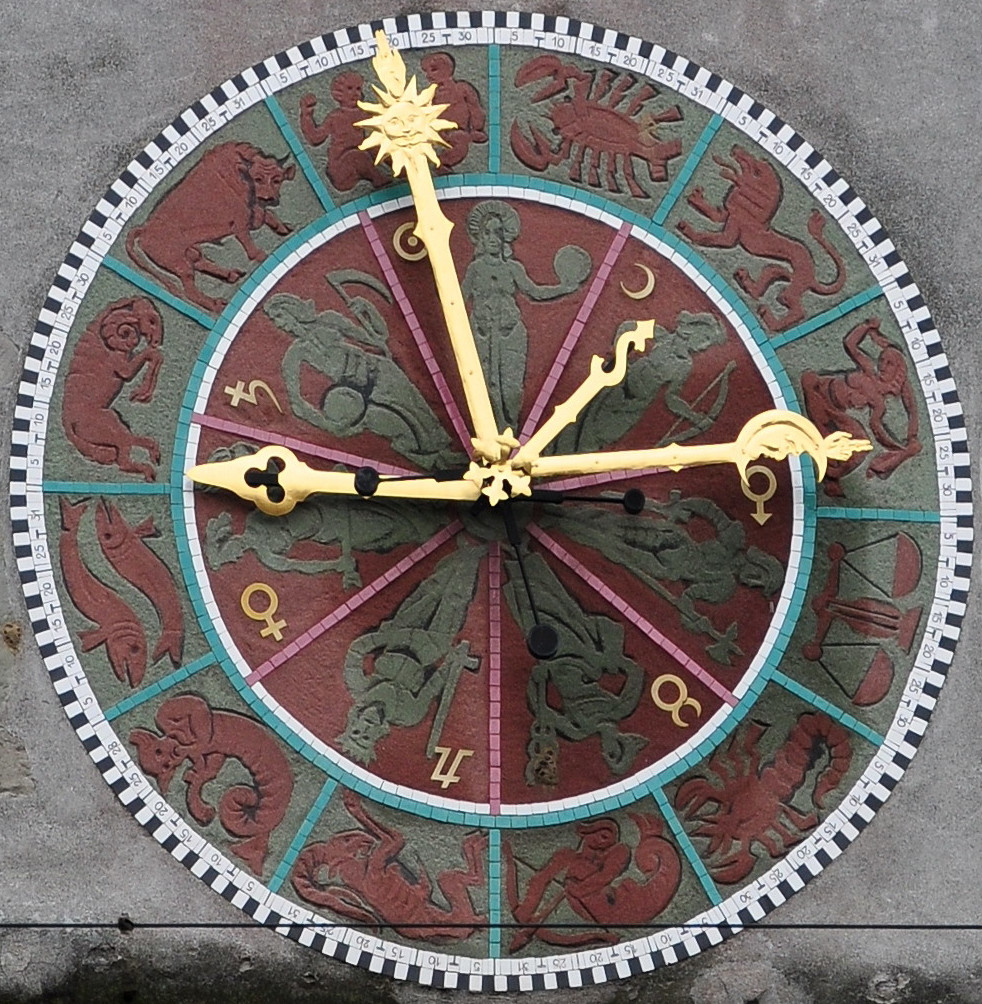
16th-century mechanical clock + calendar, using the symbols of the eponymous planets for the days of the week.

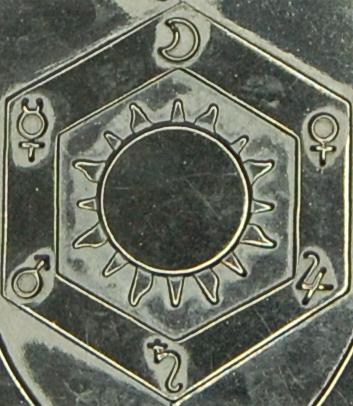
Planetary-metal symbols at the center of the coat of arms of the Royal Society of Chemistry

=== Earth symbol ===
Four-quarters-of-the-world symbol for Earth

Globus cruciger symbol for Earth

Earth is not one of the classical planets, as "planets" by definition were "wandering stars" as seen from Earth's surface. Earth's status as planet is a consequence of heliocentrism in the 16th century. Nonetheless, there is a pre-heliocentric symbol for the world, now used as a planetary symbol for the Earth. This is a circle crossed by two lines, horizontal and vertical, representing the world divided by four rivers into the four quarters of the world (often translated as the four "corners" of the world):. A variant, now obsolete, had only the horizontal line:.

A medieval European symbol for the world – the globus cruciger, (the globe surmounted by a Christian cross) – is also used as a planetary symbol; it resembles an inverted symbol for Venus.

The planetary symbols for Earth are encoded in Unicode at U+1F728 🜨 ALCHEMICAL SYMBOL FOR VERDIGRIS and U+2641 ♁ EARTH.

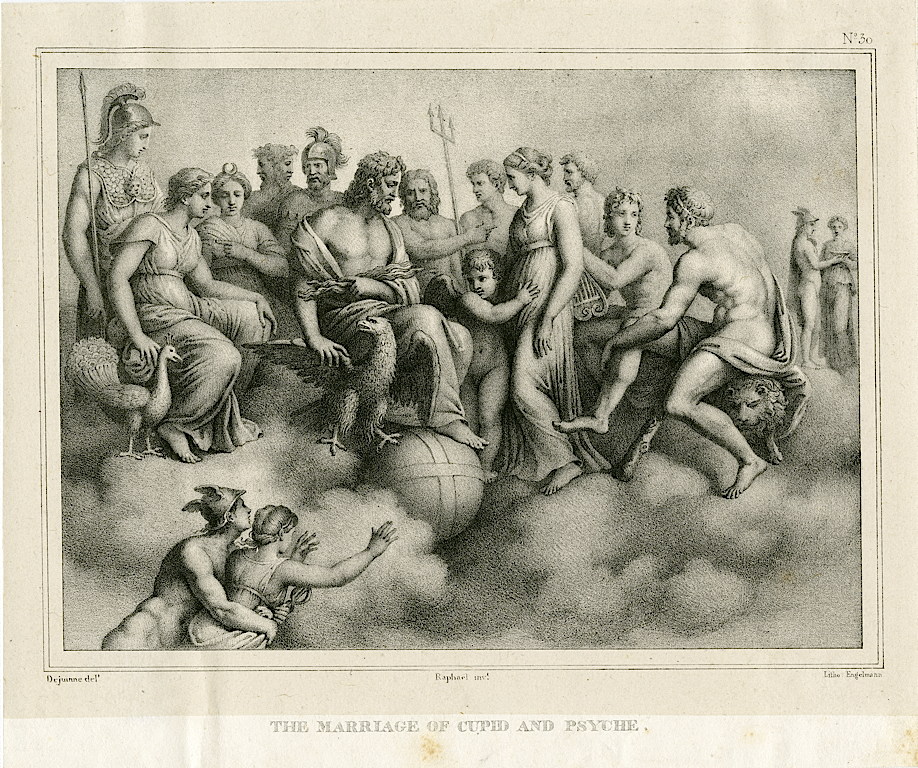
The Olympian gods, atop a -shaped world

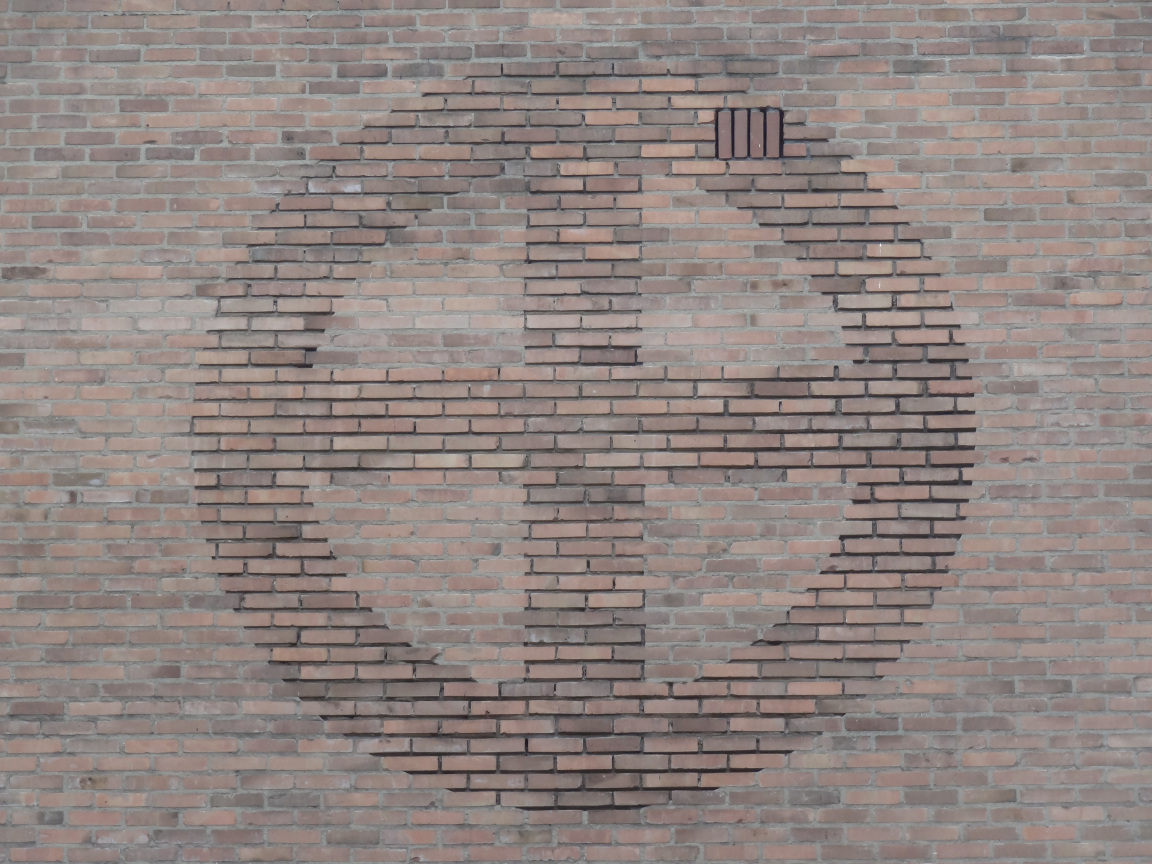
Stylized Earth symbol
A simple globus cruciger

Three globi crucigeri in the coat of arms of Maschwanden in Switzerland

In the flag of Uppland, the globe of the globus cruciger is stylized as a T-and-O map,

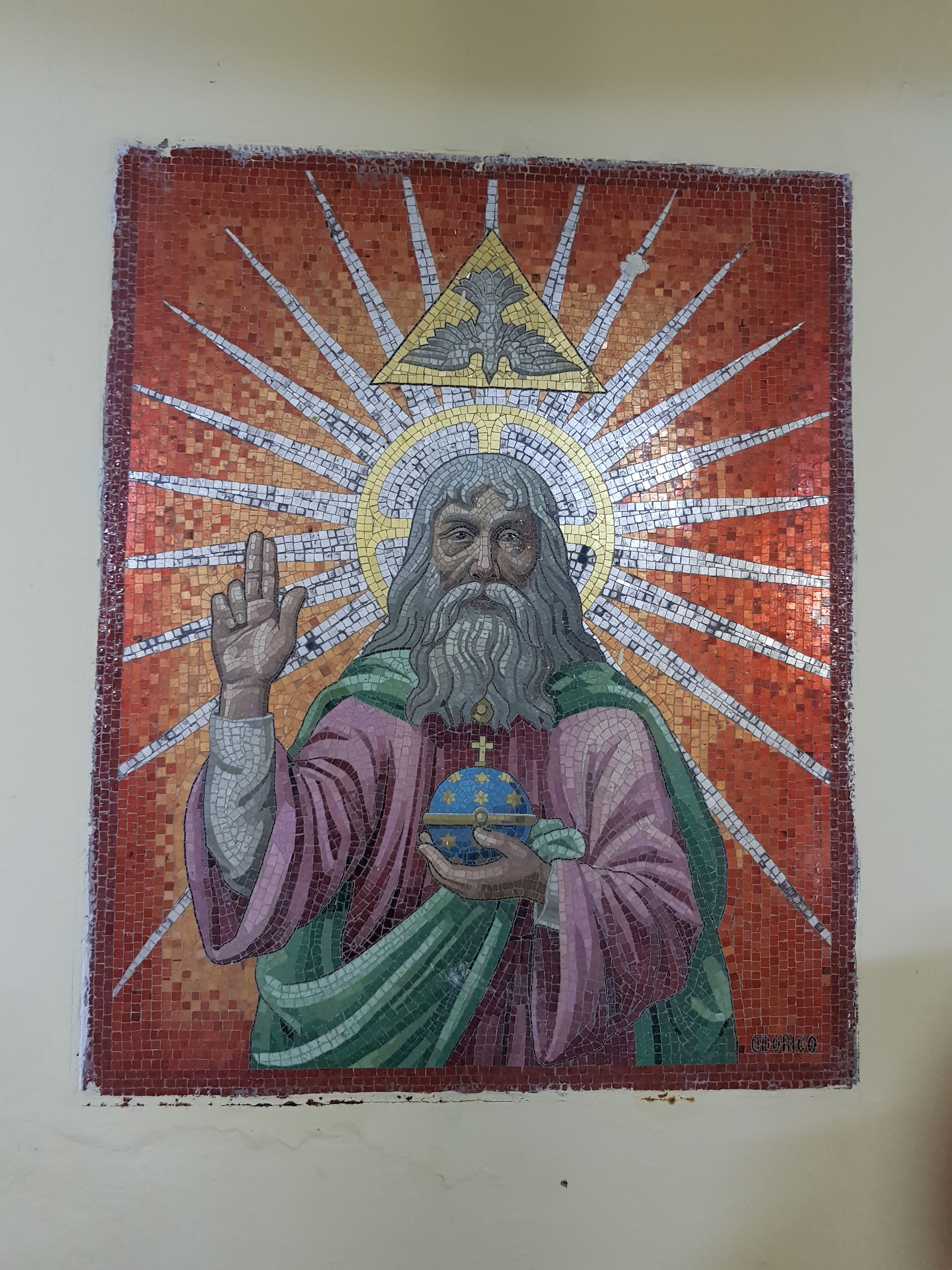
In this globus cruciger, the cross is surmounted on a celestial orb with stars

== Classical planets ==
=== Moon ===
Decrescent symbol for the Moon

Encrescent symbol for the Moon

The crescent shape has been used to represent the Moon since antiquity. In classical antiquity, it is worn by lunar deities (Selene/Luna, Artemis/Diana, Men, etc.) either on the head or behind the shoulders, with its horns pointing upward. The representation of the moon as a simple crescent with the horns pointing to the side (as a heraldic crescent increscent or crescent decrescent) is attested from late Classical times.

The same symbol can be used in a different context not for the Moon itself but for a lunar phase, as part of a sequence of four symbols for "new moon" (U+1F311 🌑︎), "waxing" (U+263D ☽︎), "full moon" (U+1F315 🌕︎) and "waning" (U+263E ☾︎).

The Moon symbol, representing silver mining, in the municipal arms of Sala in Sweden

The Moon symbol in the municipal arms of Silvberg ('Silver Mountain') in Sweden

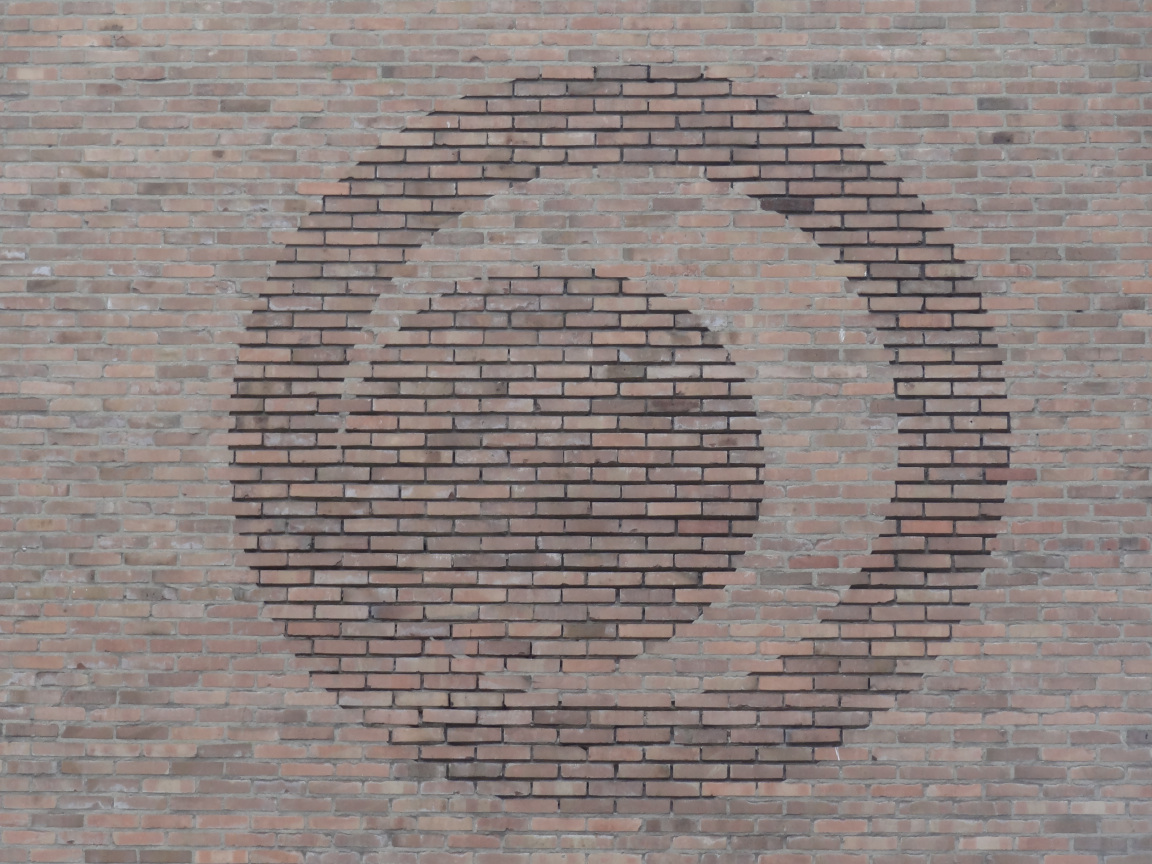
Stylized Moon symbol

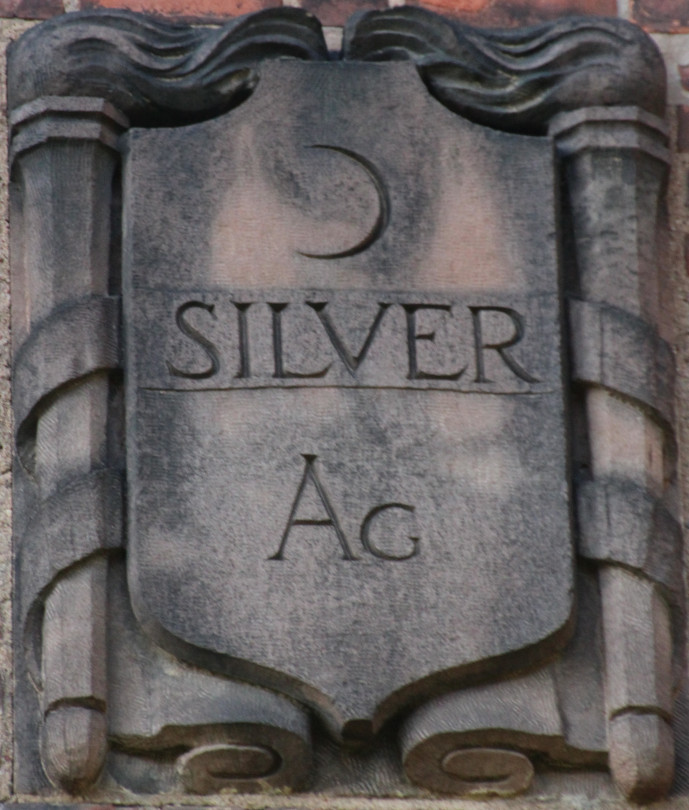
The Moon for silver

=== Mercury ===
Crossed caduceus symbol for Mercury

The symbol ☿ for Mercury is a caduceus (a staff entwined with two serpents), a symbol associated with Mercury / Hermes throughout antiquity. Some time after the 11th century, a cross was added to the bottom of the staff to Christianize the symbol.

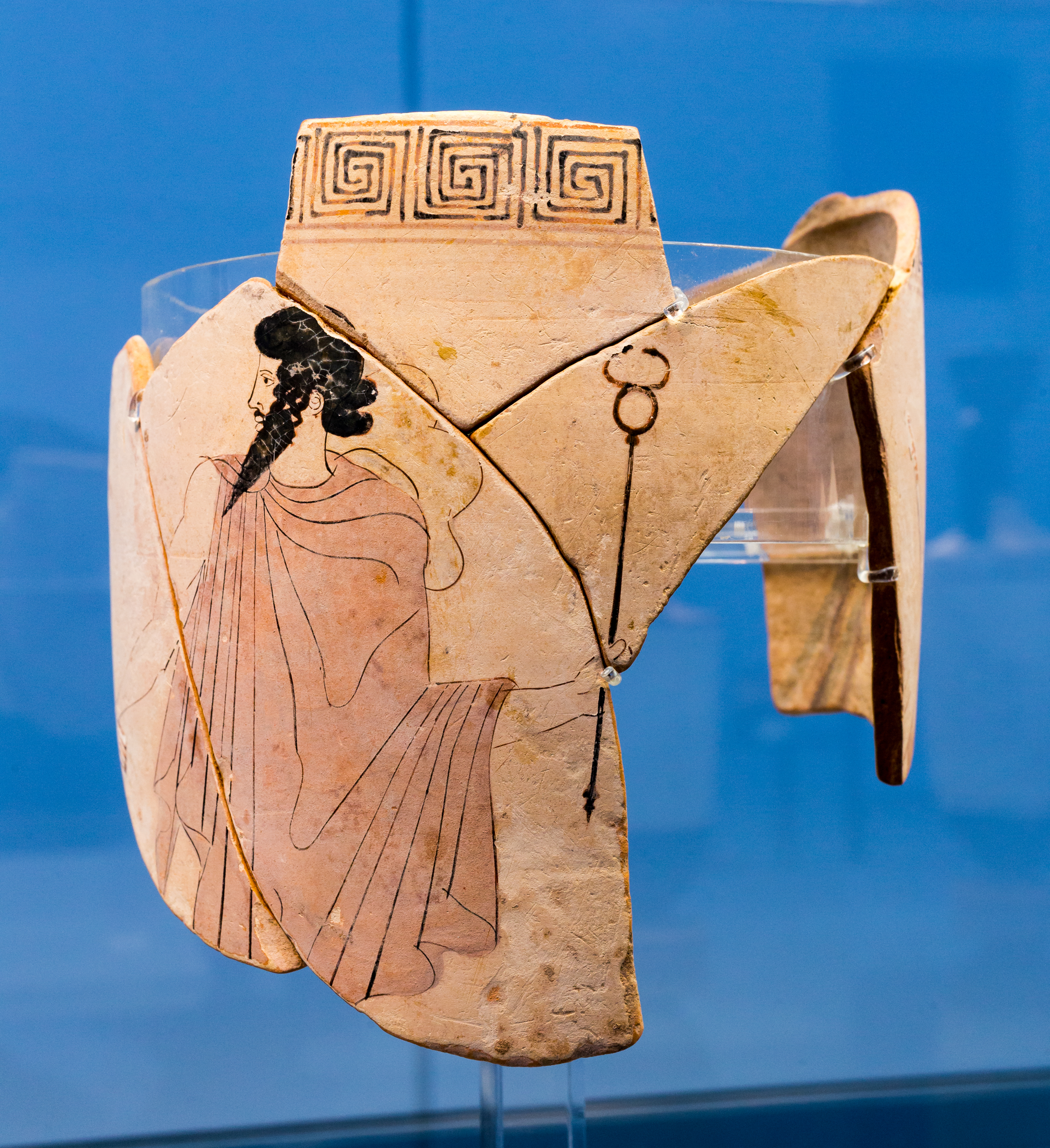
The god Hermes (Mercury) with his caduceus

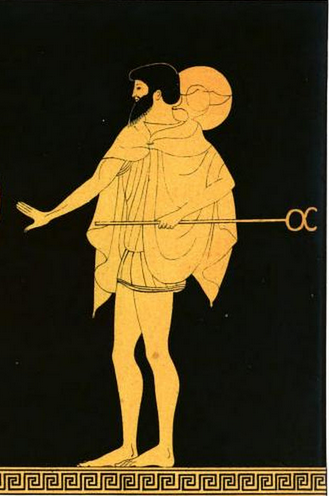
The caduceus, copied from pottery

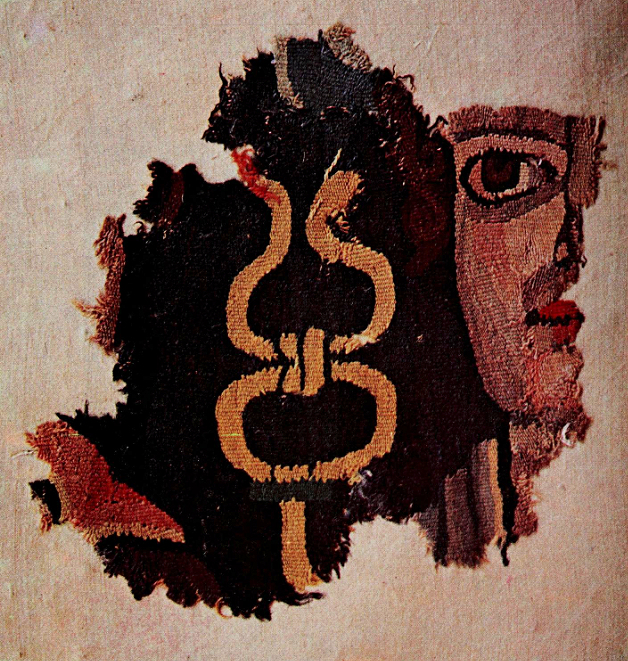
The caduceus in a tapestry, 3rd century

Mercury symbol, representing quicksilver mining, in the municipal coat of arms of Stahlberg, Rhineland-Palatinate, Germany.

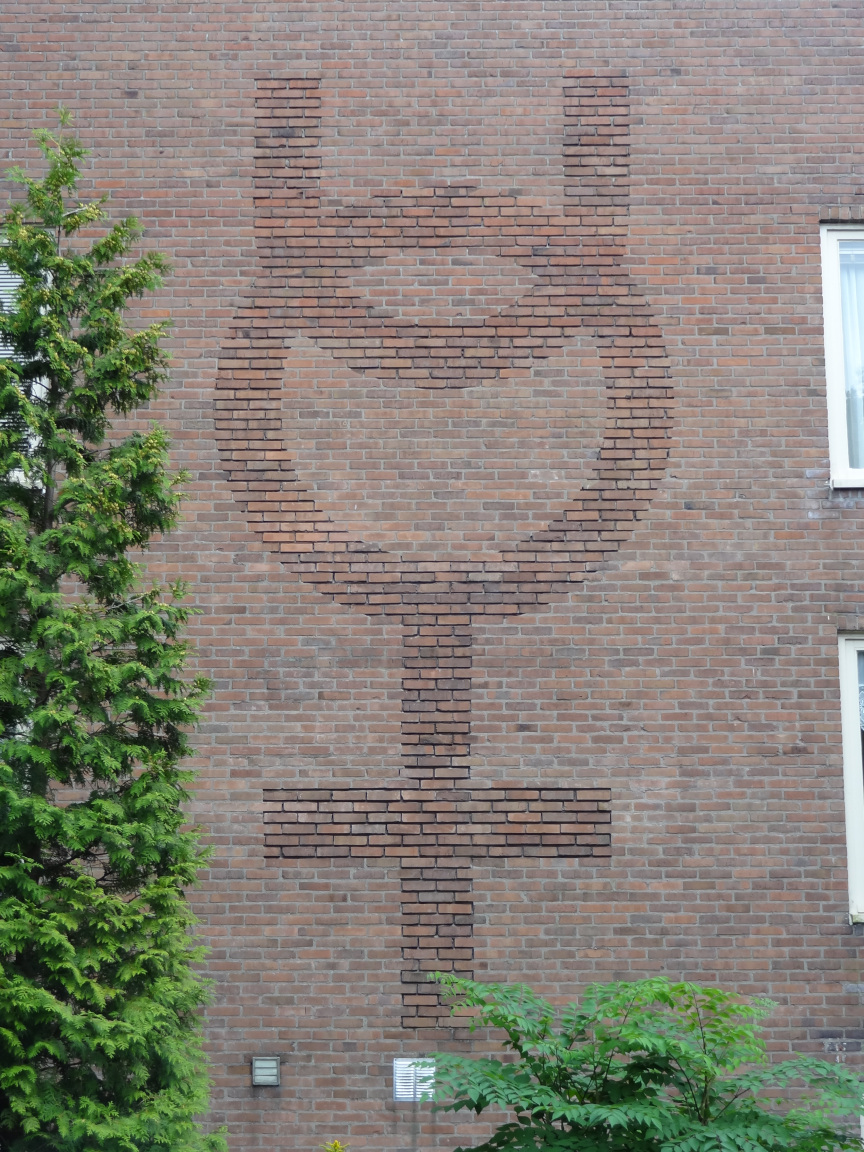
Stylized Mercury symbol

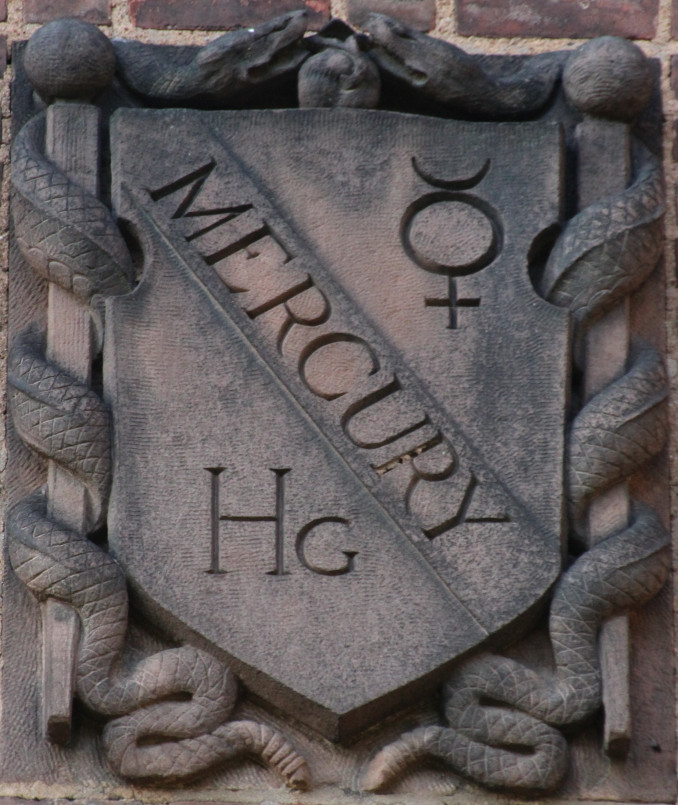
Mercury for quicksilver

The symbol ☿ was once the designated symbol for hermaphroditic or 'perfect' flowers, but botanists now use ⚥ for these. A related usage is for the 'worker' or 'neuter' sex among social insects that is neither male nor (due to its lack of reproductive capacity) fully female, such as worker bees. More recently, it has been used to indicate intersex, transgender, or non-binary gender.

The Unicode codepoint is U+263F ☿ MERCURY.

=== Venus ===
Crossed copper symbol for Venus

The Venus symbol, ♀, consists of a circle with a small cross below it. It is conjectured to be a depiction of the hand-mirror of the goddess, which may also explain Venus's association with the planetary metal copper, as mirrors in antiquity were made of polished copper, though this is not certain. The addition of the cross is relatively recent – in the Greek Oxyrhynchus Papyri 235, the symbols for Venus and Mercury did not have the cross on the bottom stem, and Venus appears without the cross (⚲) in Johannes Kamateros' 12th-century Compendium of Astrology.

In botany and biology, the symbol for Venus is used to represent the female sex, alongside the symbol for Mars representing the male sex, following a convention introduced by Linnaeus in the 1750s. (Note: "In his Systema Naturae (Leyden, 1735) he [Linnaeus] used them with their traditional associations for metals. Their first biological use is in the Linnaean dissertation Plantae hybridae xxx sistit J.J. Haartman (1751) where in discussing hybrid plants Linnaeus denoted the supposed female parent species by the sign ♀, the male parent by the sign ♂, the hybrid by ☿: 'matrem signo ♀, patrem ♂ & plantam hybridam ☿ designavero'. In subsequent publications he retained the signs ♀ and ♂ for male and female individuals but discarded ☿ for hybrids; the last are now indicated by the multiplication sign ×." "Linnaeus's first general use of the signs of ♀ and ♂ was in his Species Plantarum (1753) written between 1746 and 1752 and surveying concisely the whole plant kingdom as then known. ... In order to save space Linnaeus employed the astronomical symbols of Saturn, Jupiter, Mars and the Sun to denote woody, herbaceous perennial, biennial and annual plants respectively [ed.: the orbital periods of Saturn, Jupiter, Mars and Earth about the Sun are 29, 12, 2, and 1 year] ... and Mercury, Mars and Venus for the hermaphrodite, male and female conditions" ... "Later, in his Mantissa Plantarum (1767) and Mantissa Plantarum altera (1771), Linnaeus regularly used ♂, ♀ and ☿ for male, female and hermaphrodite flowers respectively. Their aptness made them easy to remember and their convenience led to their general acceptance in zoology as well as botany. Koelreuter found them especially convenient when recording his experiments in hybridization; as late as 1778 he used the sign ☿ to denote a hybrid plant." — Stearn (1962))

Unicode encodes the symbol as U+2640 ♀ FEMALE SIGN, in the Miscellaneous Symbols block. (Note: Glossed in the official Unicode code chart as " = Venus = alchemical symbol for copper → 1F469 👩 woman → 1F6BA 🚺 women's symbol".)

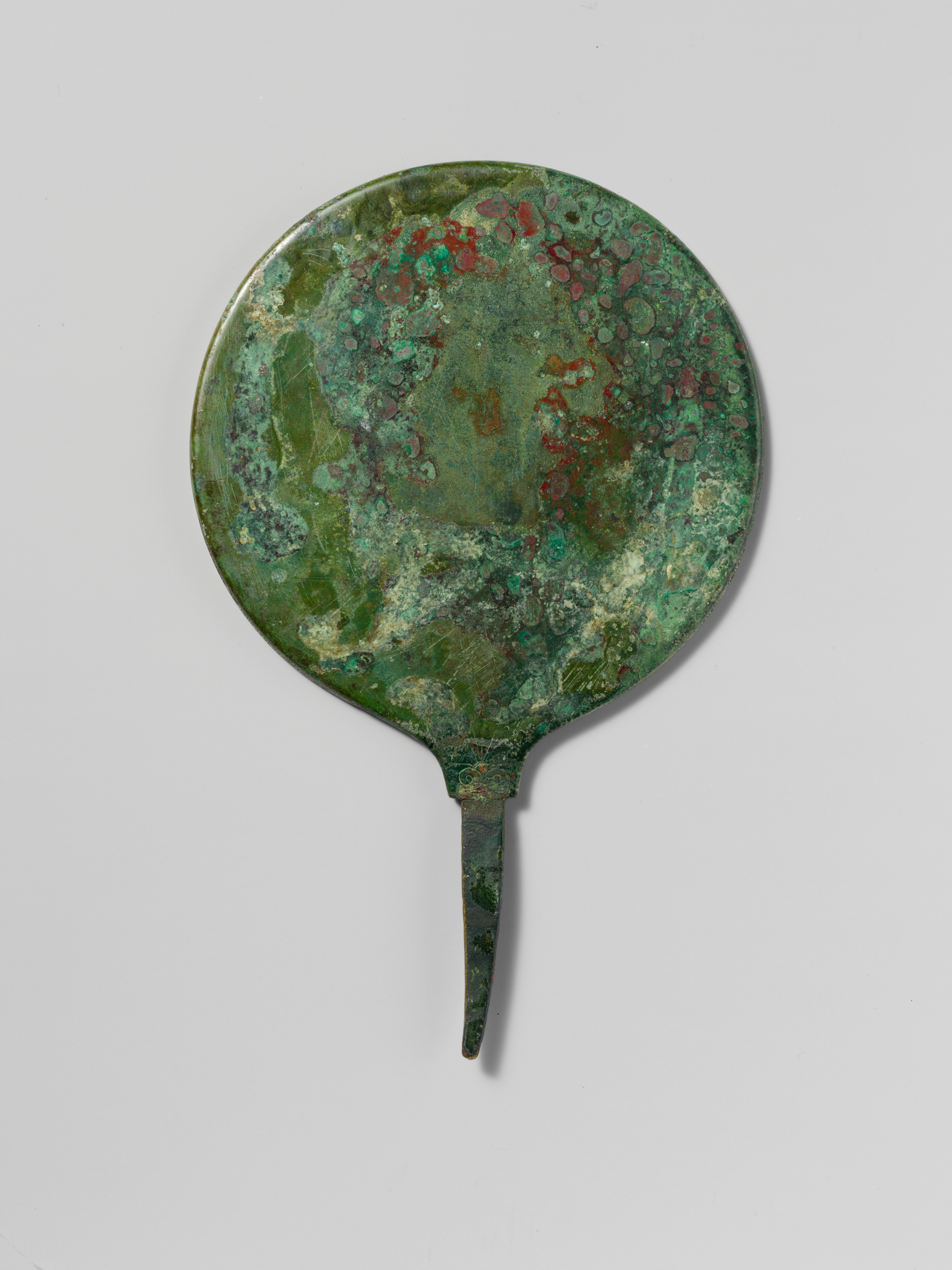
A bronze mirror, of the type associated with Venus

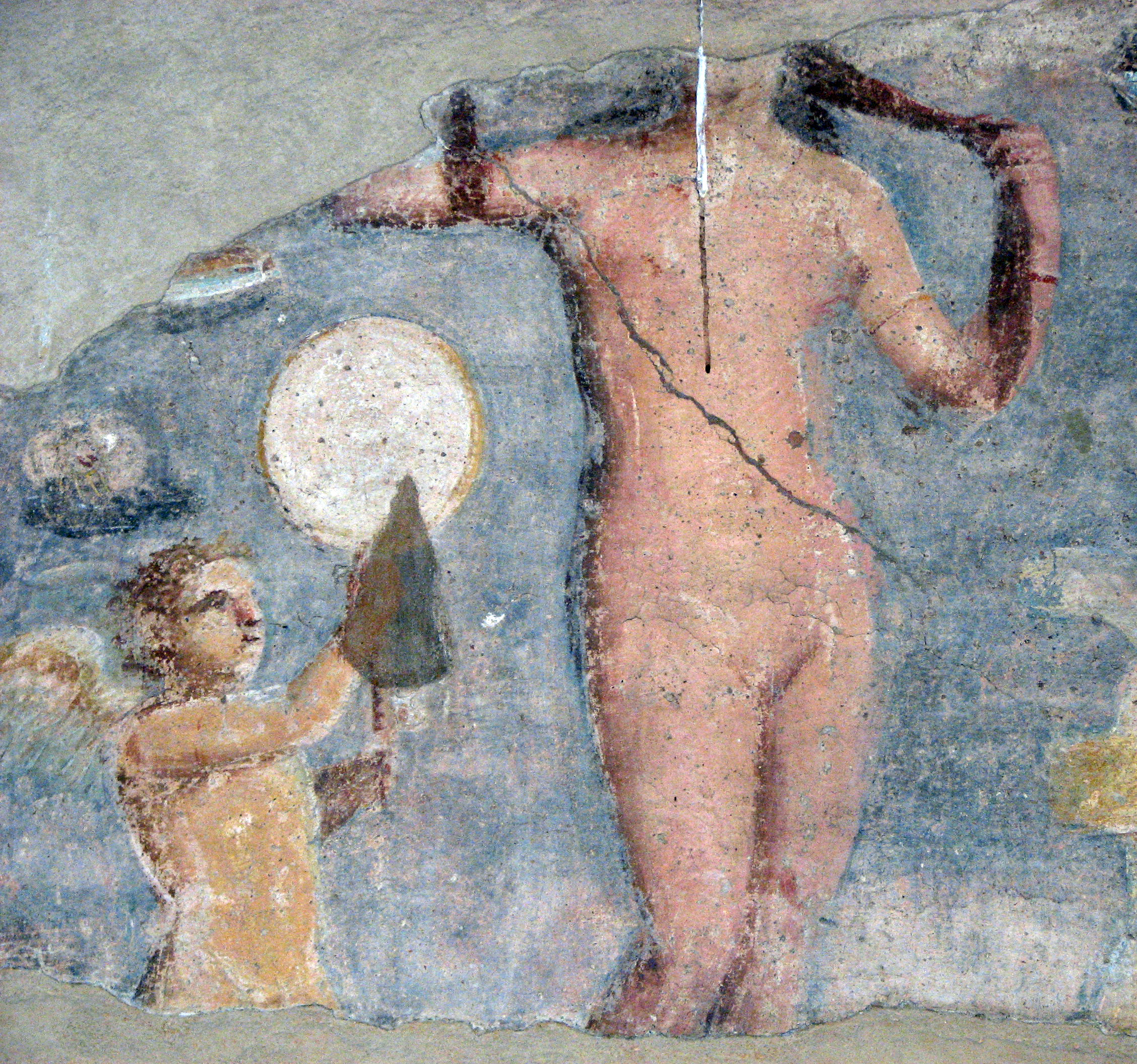
Cupid holding up a similar mirror to Venus

The Venus symbol, representing copper mining, in the municipal coat of arms of Falun Municipality in Sweden (1932)

Raised fist within Venus symbol, used as a symbol of second-wave feminism (1960s) (Note: The raised fist symbol is attributed to Robin Morgan, in the 1960s: "Morgan designed the universal logo of the women's movement, the woman's symbol centered with a raised fist.")

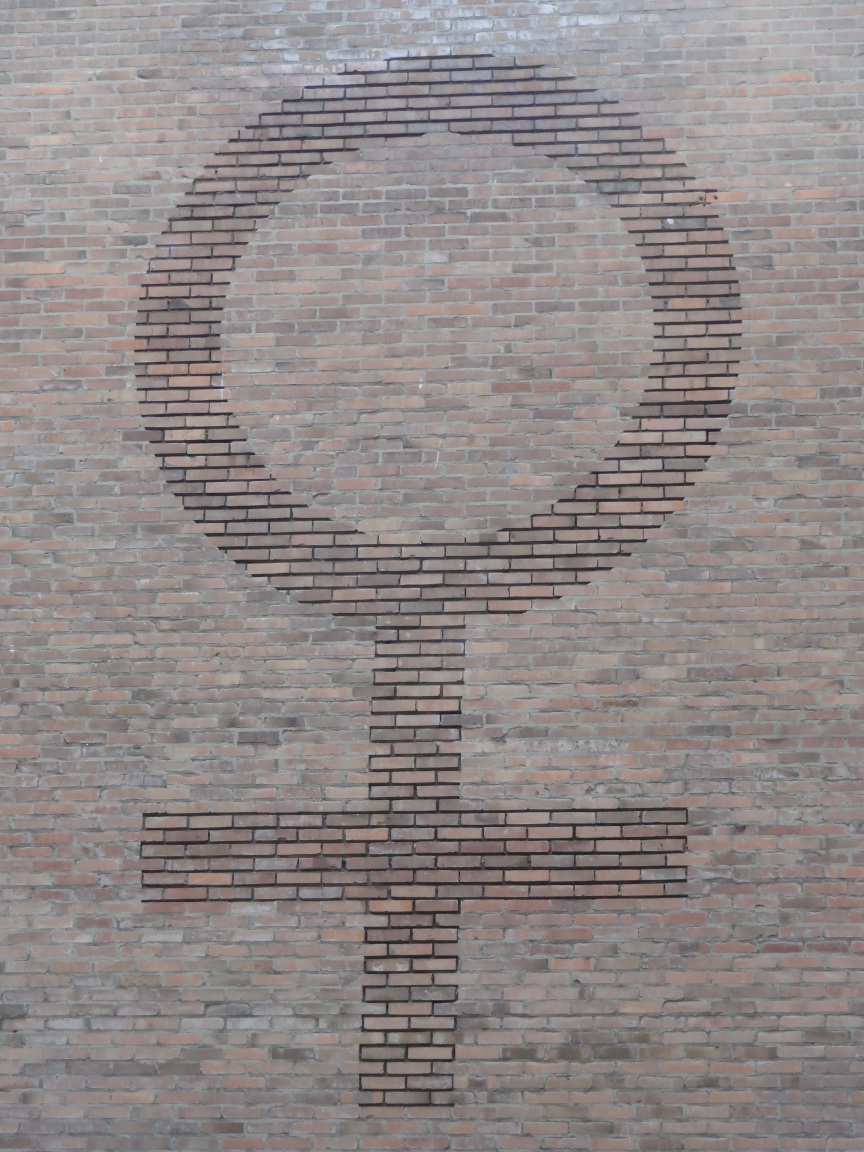
Stylized Venus symbol

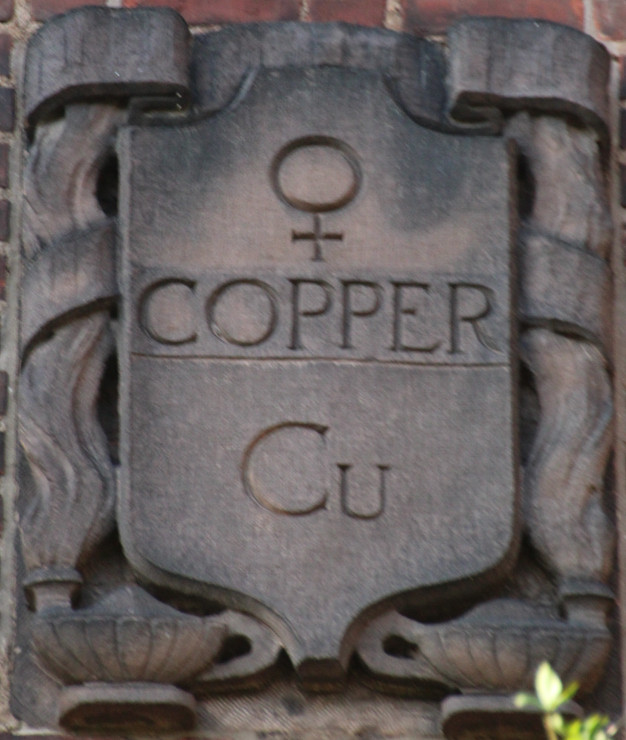
Venus for copper

=== Sun ===
Modern astronomical symbol for the Sun

The modern astronomical symbol for the Sun, the circumpunct (U+2609 ☉ SUN), was first used in the Renaissance. It possibly represents Apollo's golden shield with a boss.

Bianchini's planisphere, produced in the 2nd century, shows a circlet with rays radiating from it. In late Classical times, the Sun is attested as a circle with a single ray. A diagram in Johannes Kamateros' 12th century Compendium of Astrology shows the same symbol. This older symbol is encoded by Unicode as U+1F71A 🜚 ALCHEMICAL SYMBOL FOR GOLD in the Alchemical Symbols block. Both symbols have been used alchemically for gold, as have more elaborate symbols showing a disk with multiple rays or even a face.

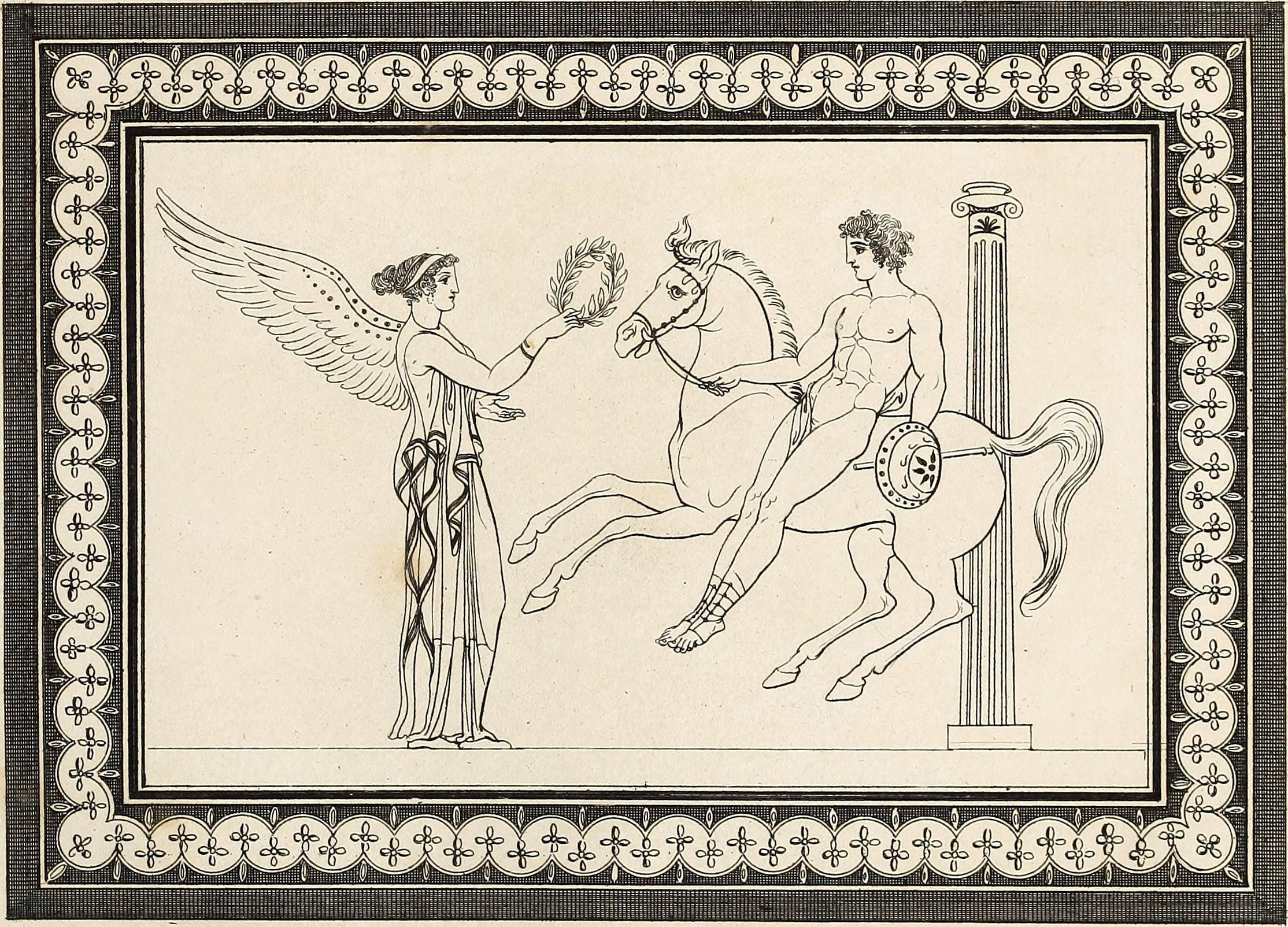
A buckler with a sun symbol and dot at center

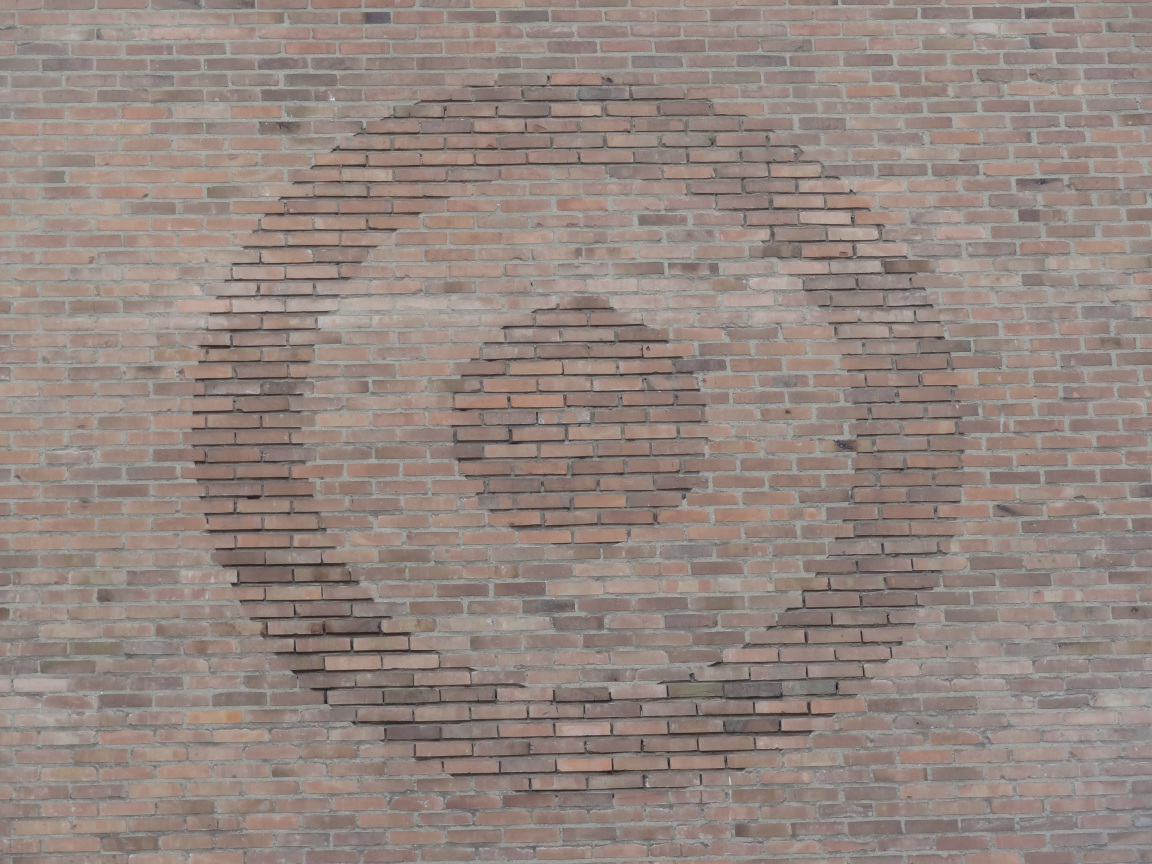
Stylized circumpunct symbol for the Sun

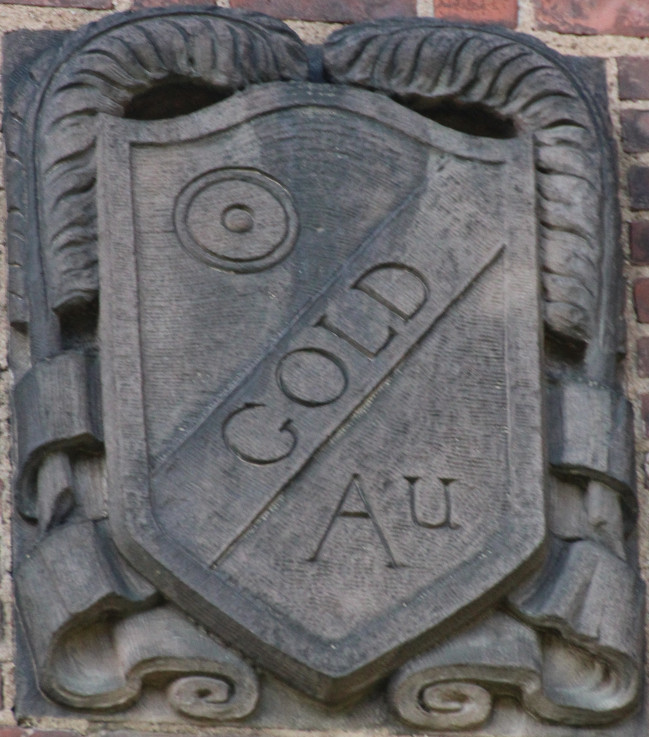
The Sun for gold

🜚, the medieval astronomical symbol for the Sun

=== Mars ===
Spear and shield symbol for Mars

The Mars symbol, ♂, is a depiction of a shield and a spear, indicating the god of war. It is also the old and obsolete symbol for iron in alchemy. In zoology and botany, it is used to represent the male sex (alongside the astrological symbol for Venus representing the female sex), following a convention introduced by Linnaeus in the 1750s.

The symbol dates from at latest the 11th century, at which time it was an arrow across or through a circle, thought to represent the shield and spear of the god Mars; in the medieval form, for example in the 12th-century Compendium of Astrology by Johannes Kamateros, the spear is drawn across the shield. The Greek Oxyrhynchus Papyri show a different symbol, perhaps simply a spear.

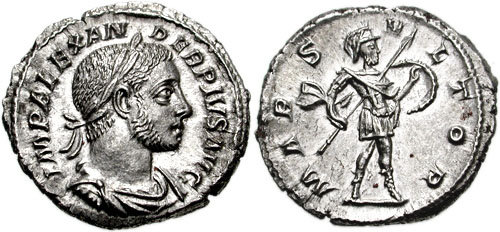
3rd-century coin with Mars on the reverse, with lance and shield. The same symbols were used for Athena (Pallas).

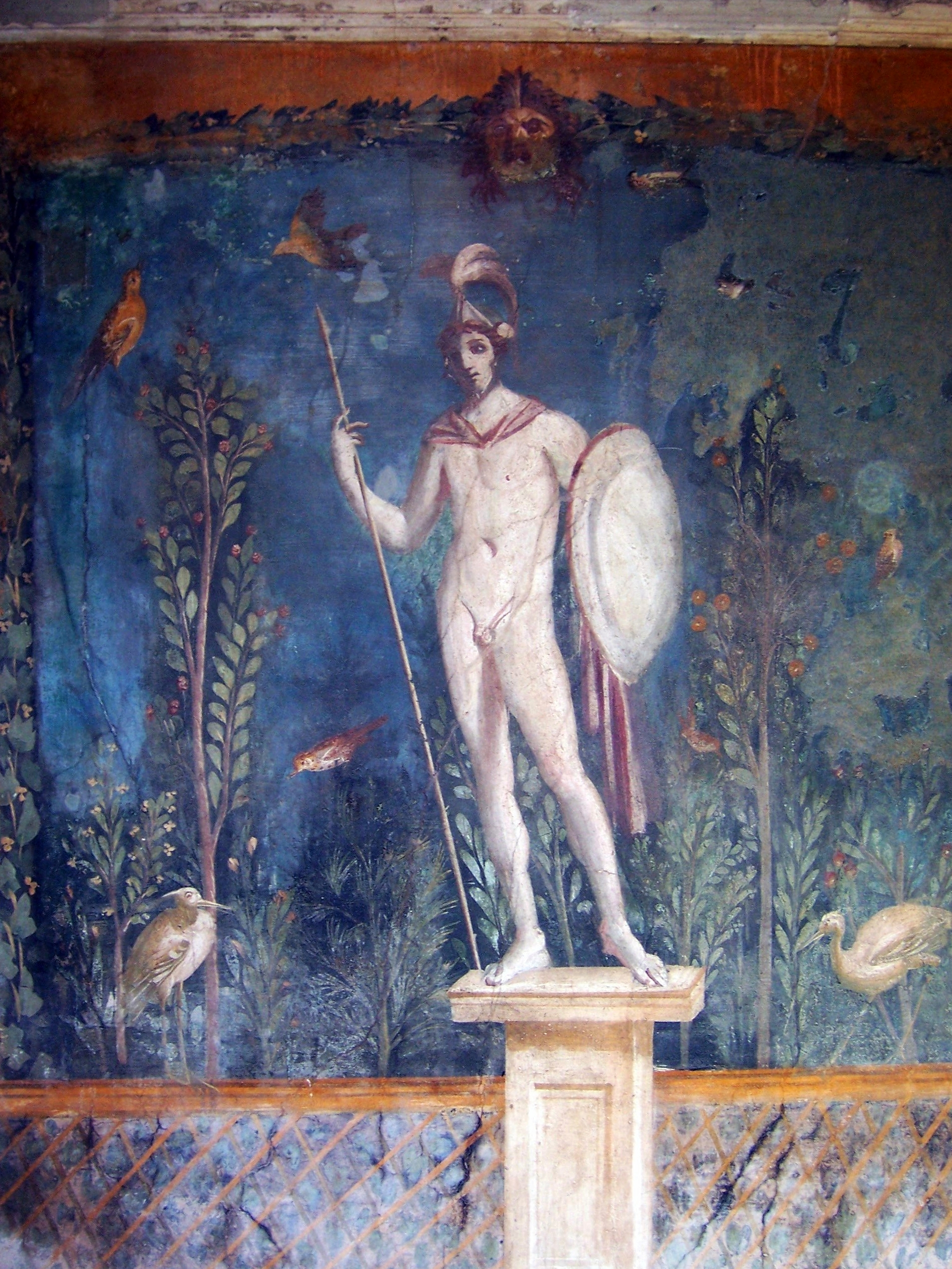
Mars with spear and shield, Pompeii.

The Mars symbol, representing iron mining, in the municipal coat of arms of Karlskoga in Sweden

The Mars symbol in the municipal coat of arms of Loppi in Finland

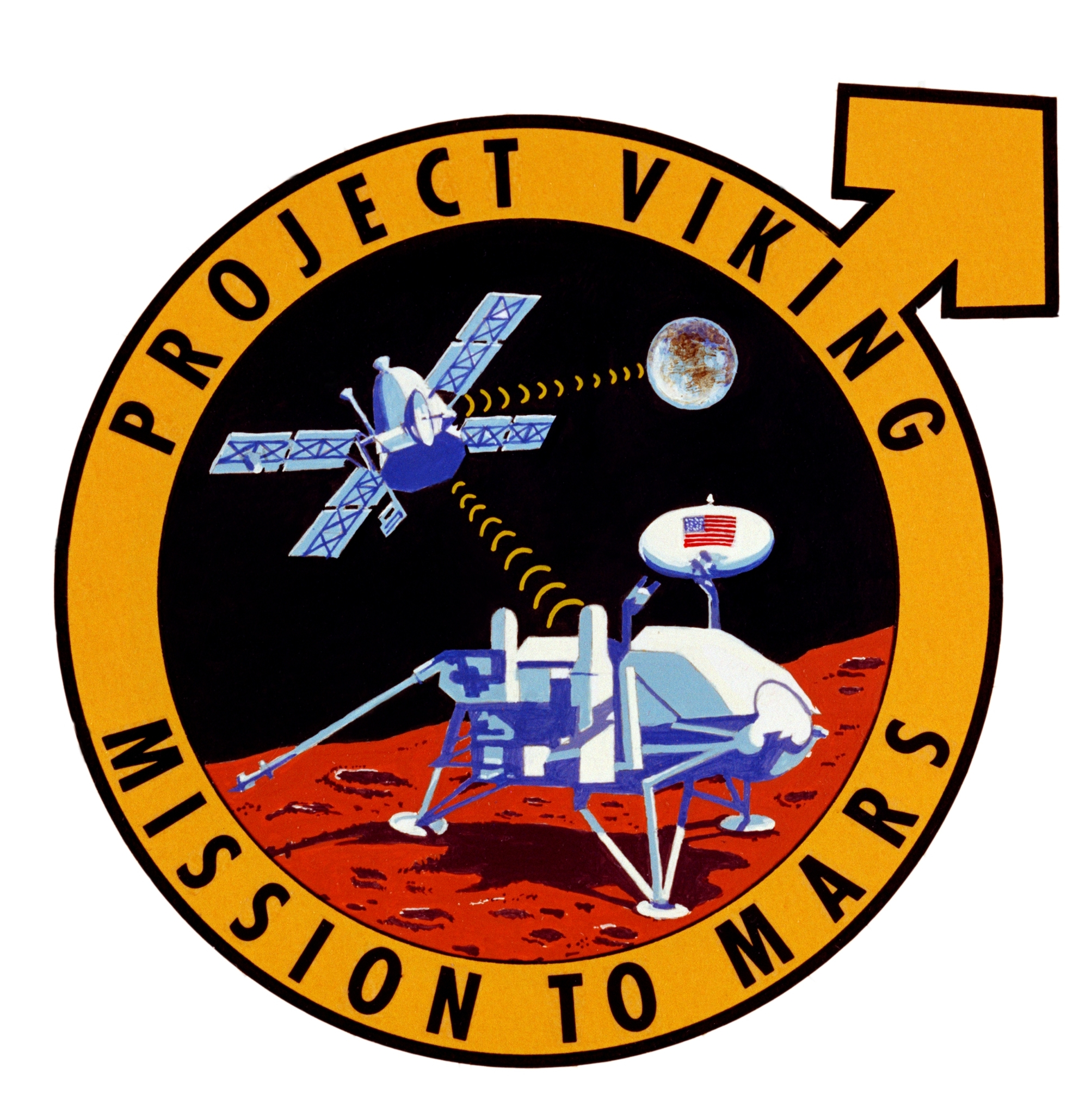
Mars symbol in the patch for NASA's Viking mission

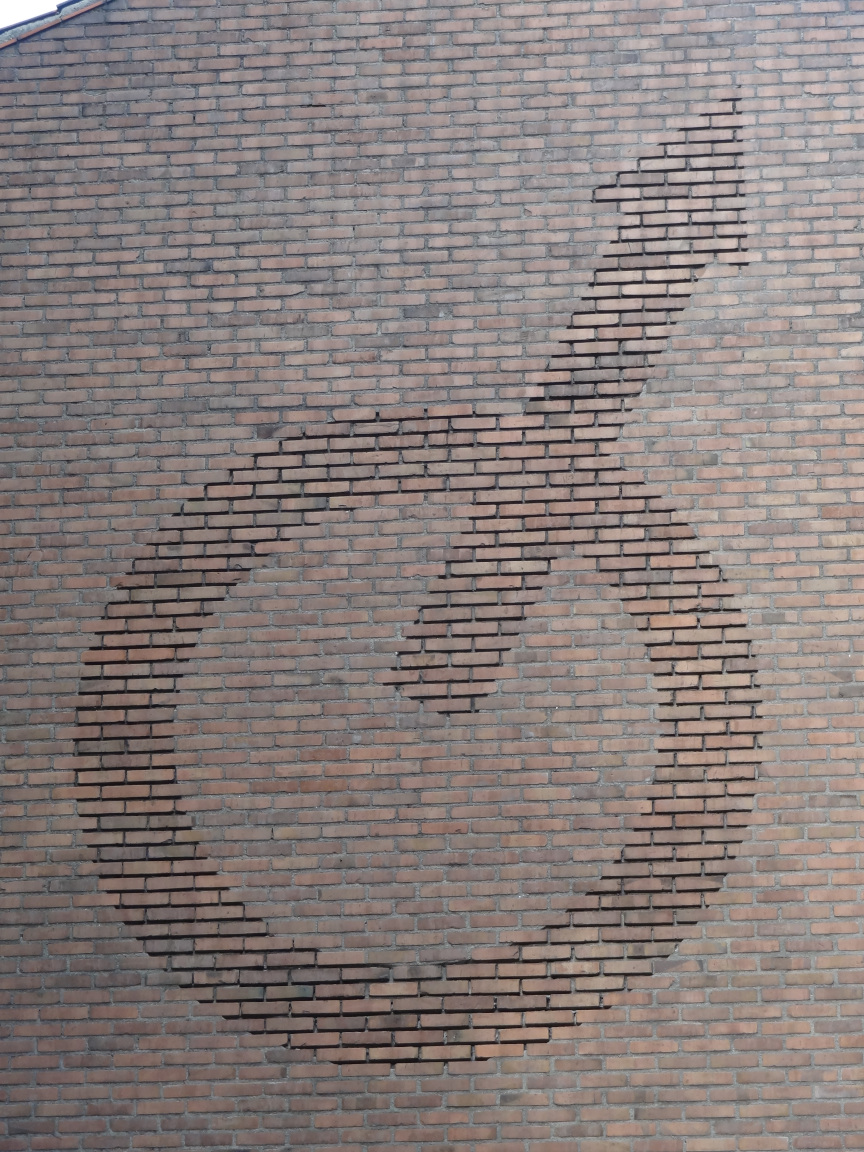
Stylized Mars symbol. The spear partly crosses the shield.

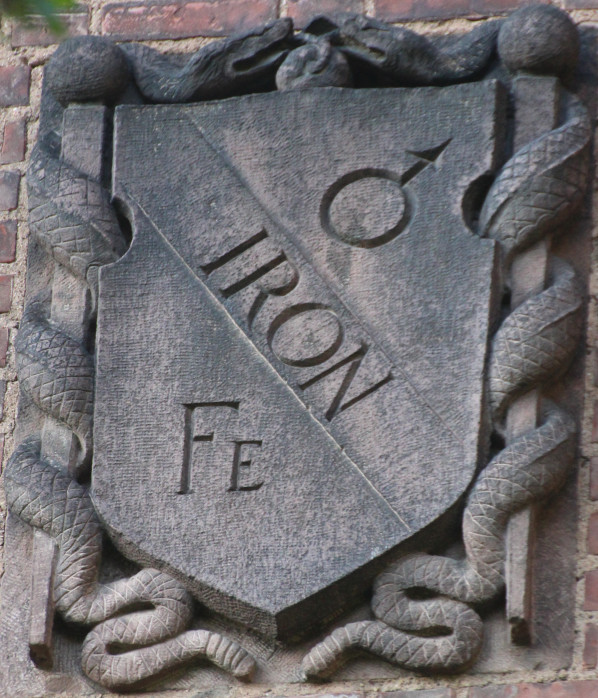
The Mars symbol was used as the symbol for iron

Its Unicode codepoint is U+2642 ♂ MALE SIGN (&male;).

=== Jupiter ===
Zeus initial for Jupiter

The symbol for Jupiter, ♃, was originally a Greek zeta, Ζ, with a stroke indicating that it is an abbreviation (for Zeus, the Greek equivalent of Roman Jupiter).

Its Unicode codepoint is U+2643 ♃ JUPITER.

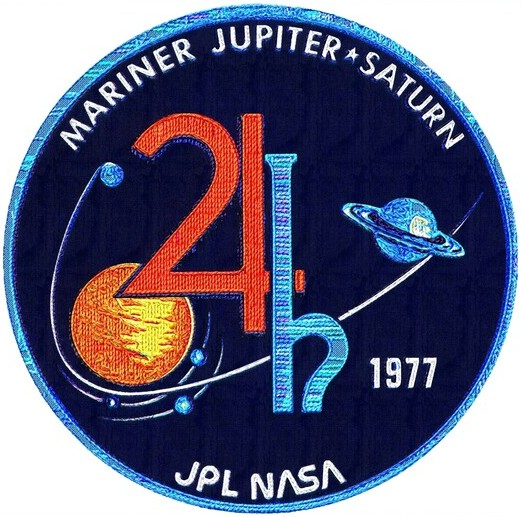
Jupiter and Saturn symbols in patch for NASA's Mariner Jupiter-Saturn mission

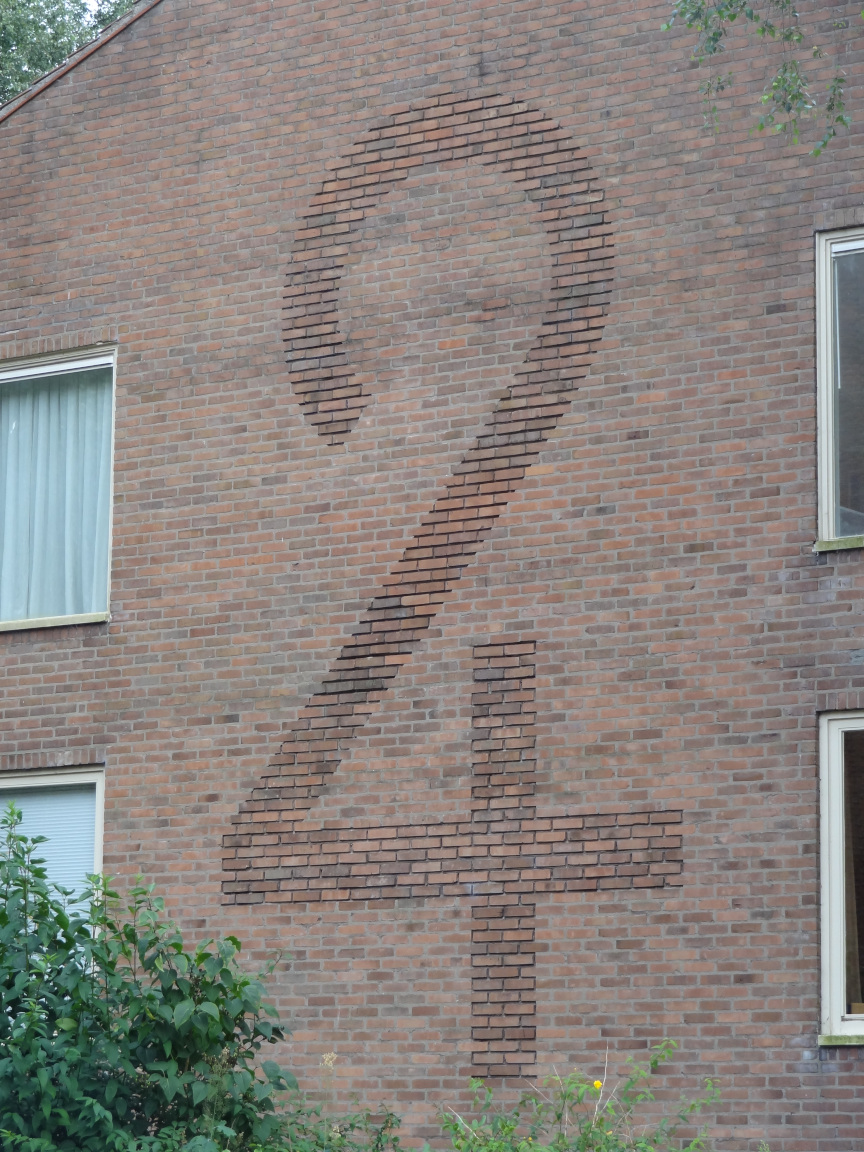
Stylized Jupiter symbol

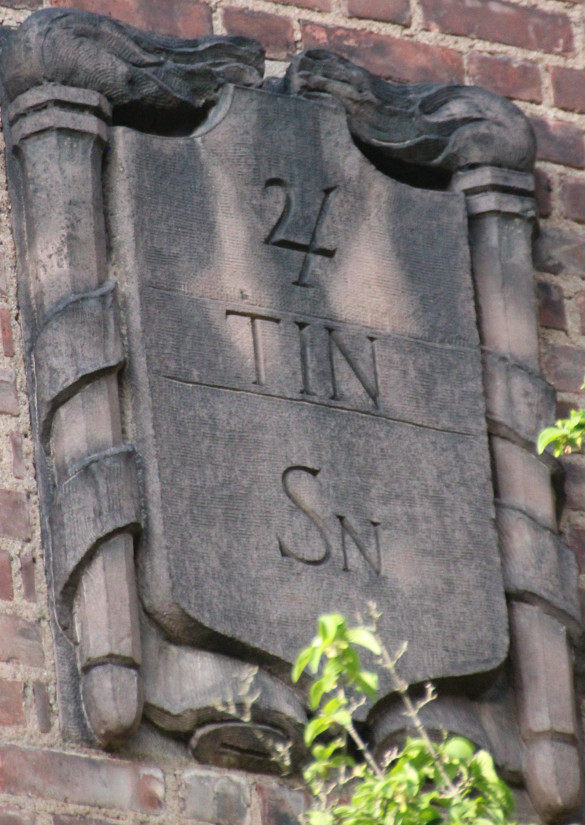
Jupiter for tin

A modern form of the monogram reflects its origin in the letter 'Z'

=== Saturn ===
Crossed kappa-rho ligature for Saturn

Salmasius and earlier attestations show that the symbol for Saturn, ♄, derives from the initial letters (Kappa, rho) of its ancient Greek name Κρόνος (Kronos), with a stroke to indicate an abbreviation. By the time of Kamateros (12th century), the symbol had been reduced to a shape similar to a lower-case letter eta η, with the abbreviation stroke surviving (if at all) in the curl on the bottom-right end.

Its Unicode codepoint is U+2644 ♄ SATURN.

Emblem of the Fraternitas Saturni, a German magical order founded in 1926

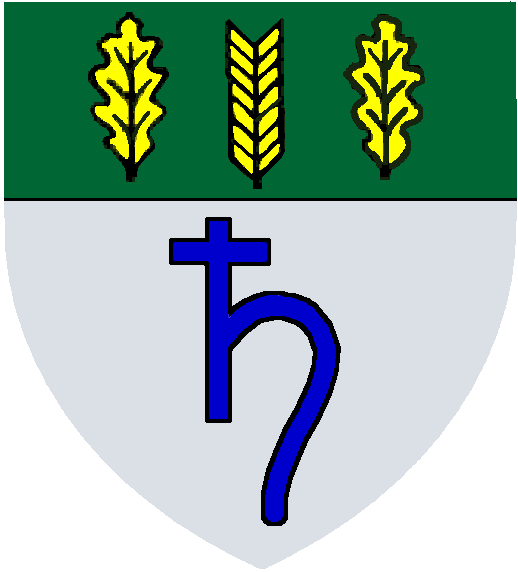
The Saturn symbol representing lead in the municipal coat of arms of Bleiwäsche, since 1975 part of Bad Wünnenberg, North Rhine-Westphalia, Germany

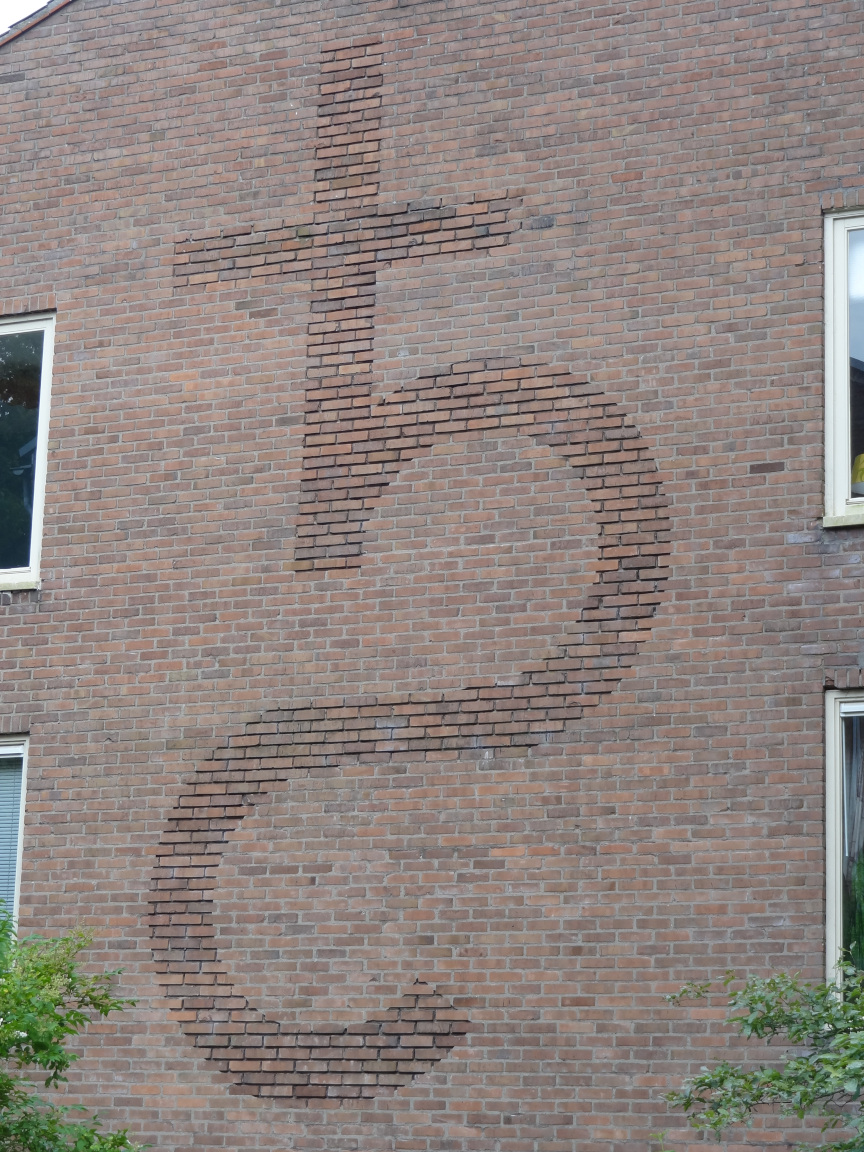
Stylized Saturn symbol

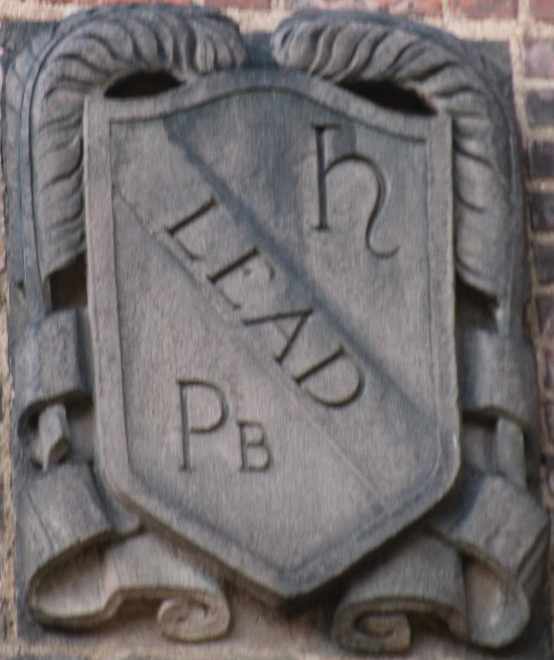
Saturn for lead (Pb)

A ligature of kappa ϰ and rho ϱ for Kronos, the ancestor of the symbol for Saturn

== Modern discoveries ==
=== Uranus ===
Platinum symbol for Uranus

Herschel monogram for Uranus

The symbols for Uranus were created shortly after its discovery in 1781. One symbol, ⛢, invented by J. G. Köhler and refined by Bode, was intended to represent the newly discovered metal platinum; since platinum, commonly called white gold, was found by chemists mixed with iron, the symbol for platinum combines the alchemical symbols for iron, ♂, and gold, ☉. Gold and iron are the planetary metals for the Sun and Mars, and so share their symbols. Several orientations were suggested, but an upright arrow is now universal.

Another symbol,, was suggested by Lalande in 1784. In a letter to Herschel, Lalande described it as "a globe surmounted by the first letter of your name". The platinum symbol tends to be used by astronomers, and the monogram by astrologers.

For use in computer systems, the symbols are encoded U+26E2 ⛢ ASTRONOMICAL SYMBOL FOR URANUS and U+2645 ♅ URANUS.

The planetary symbols as rendered in 1784, including the newly discovered Uranus (left)

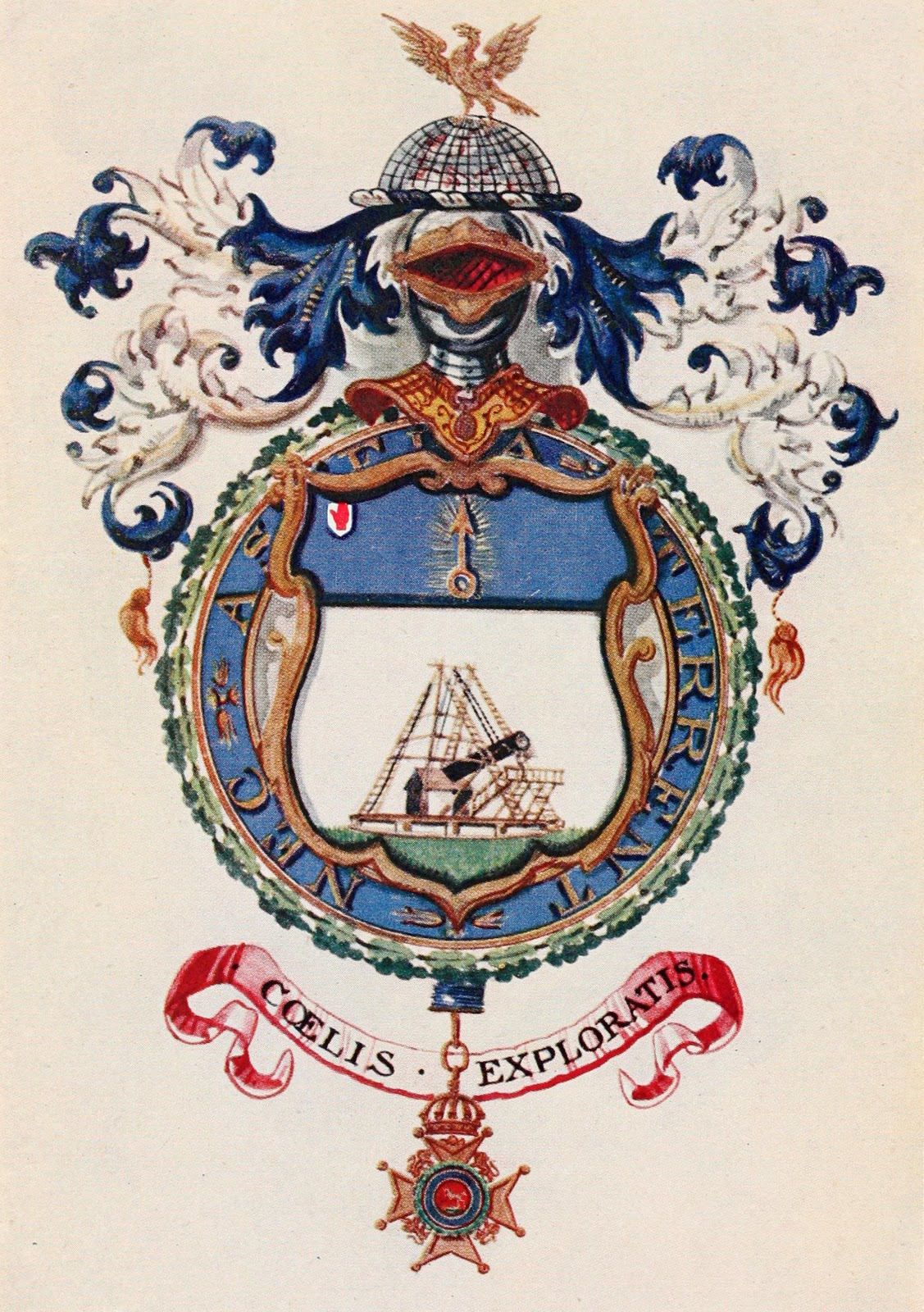
The Uranus platinum symbol on William Herschel's coat of arms (center, blue background)

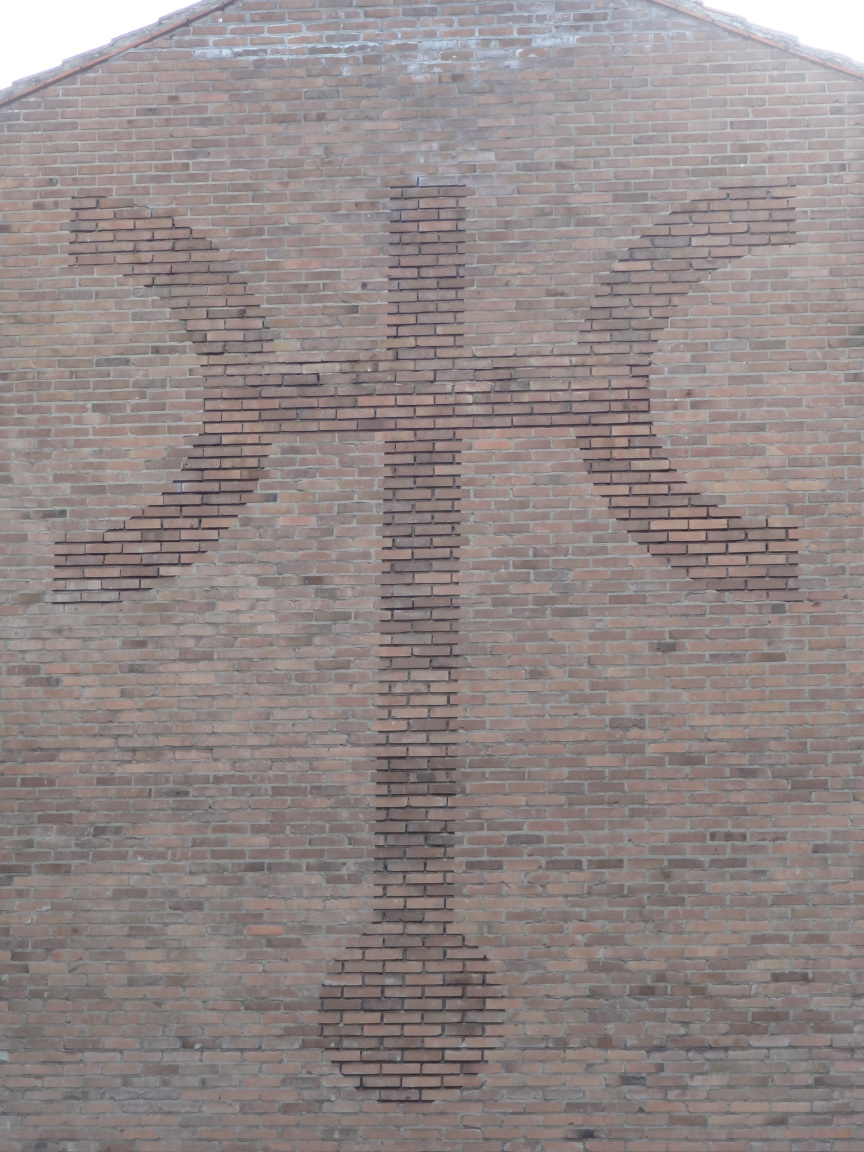
Stylized Uranus monogram

=== Neptune ===
Trident symbol for Neptune

Several symbols were proposed for Neptune to accompany the suggested names for the planet. Claiming the right to name his discovery, Urbain Le Verrier originally proposed to name the planet for the Roman god Neptune and the symbol of a trident, while falsely stating that this had been officially approved by the French Bureau des Longitudes. In October, he sought to name the planet Leverrier, after himself, and he had loyal support in this from the observatory director, François Arago, who in turn proposed a new symbol for the planet,. However, this suggestion met with resistance outside France, and French almanacs quickly reintroduced the name Herschel for Uranus, after that planet's discoverer Sir William Herschel, and Leverrier for the new planet, though it was used by anglophone institutions. Professor James Pillans of the University of Edinburgh defended the name Janus for the new planet, and proposed a key for its symbol. Meanwhile, Struve presented the name Neptune on December 29, 1846, to the Saint Petersburg Academy of Sciences. In August 1847, the Bureau des Longitudes announced its decision to follow prevailing astronomical practice and adopt the choice of Neptune, with Arago refraining from participating in this decision. The planetary symbol was Neptune's trident, with the handle stylized either as a crossed, following Mercury, Venus, Jupiter, Saturn, and the asteroids, or as an orb, following the symbols for Uranus, Earth, and Mars. The crossed variant is the more common today.

For use in computer systems, the symbols are encoded as U+2646 ♆ NEPTUNE and U+2BC9 ⯉ NEPTUNE FORM TWO.

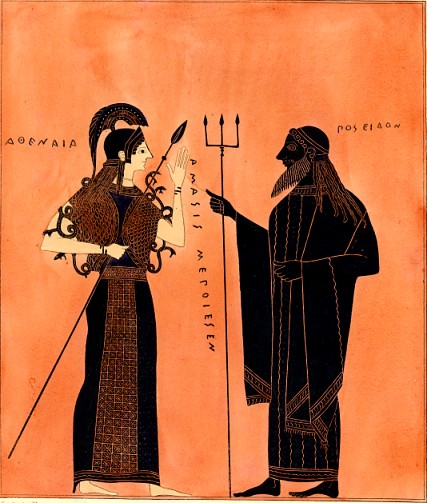
Athena (Pallas) with her lance and Poseidon (Neptune) with his trident. These weapons became the symbols of the planets Pallas and Neptune, respectively.

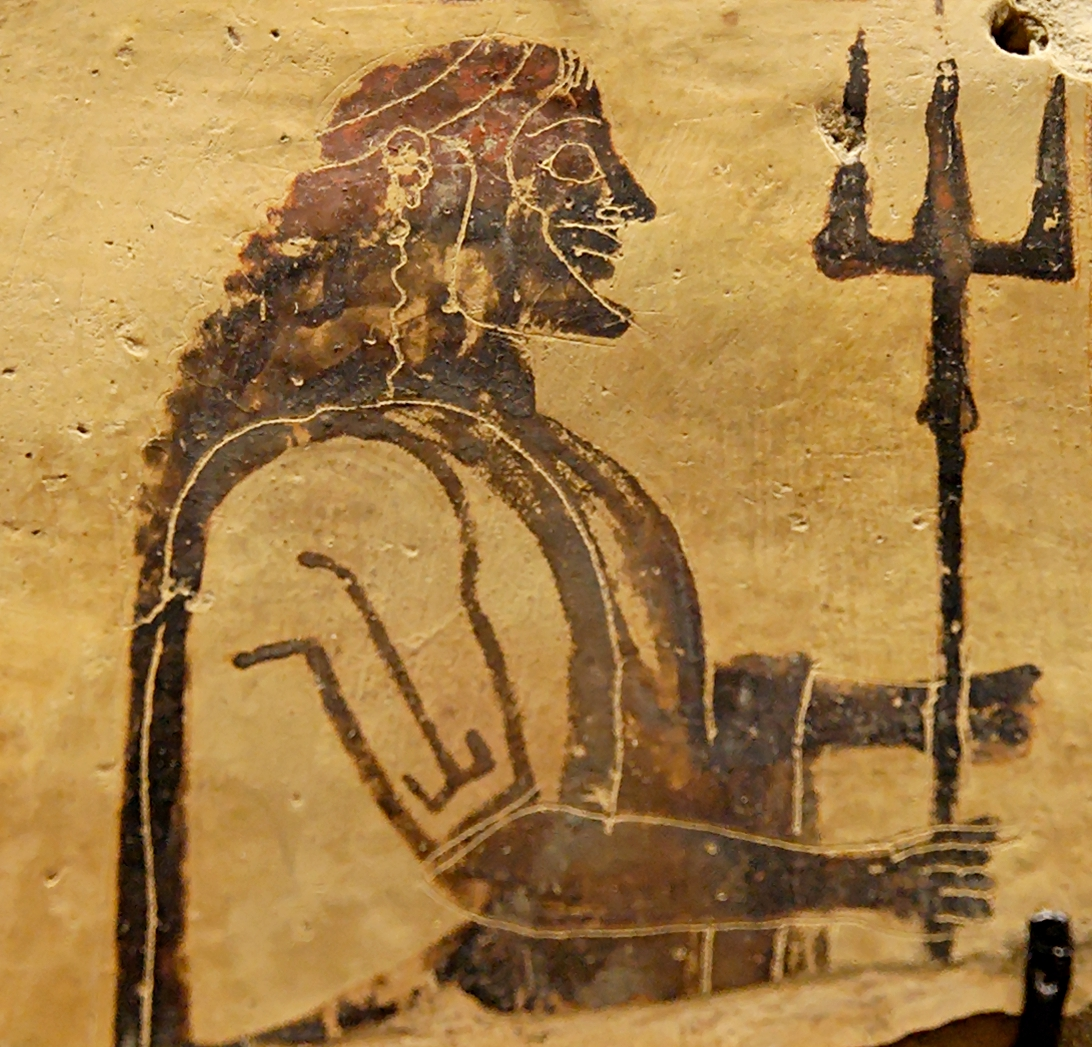
Poseidon with a trident, 6th century BCE

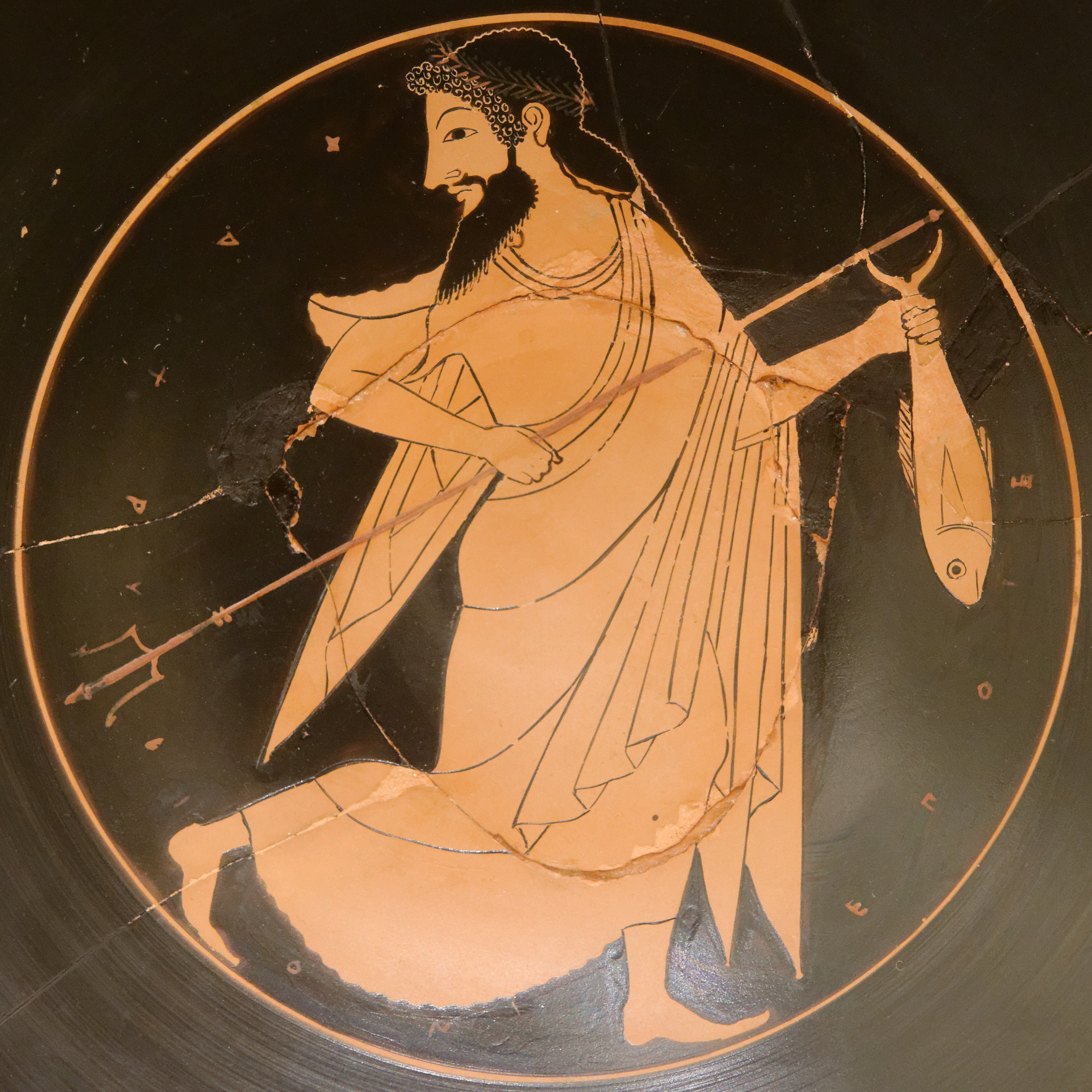
Poseidon with a trident, 6th century CE

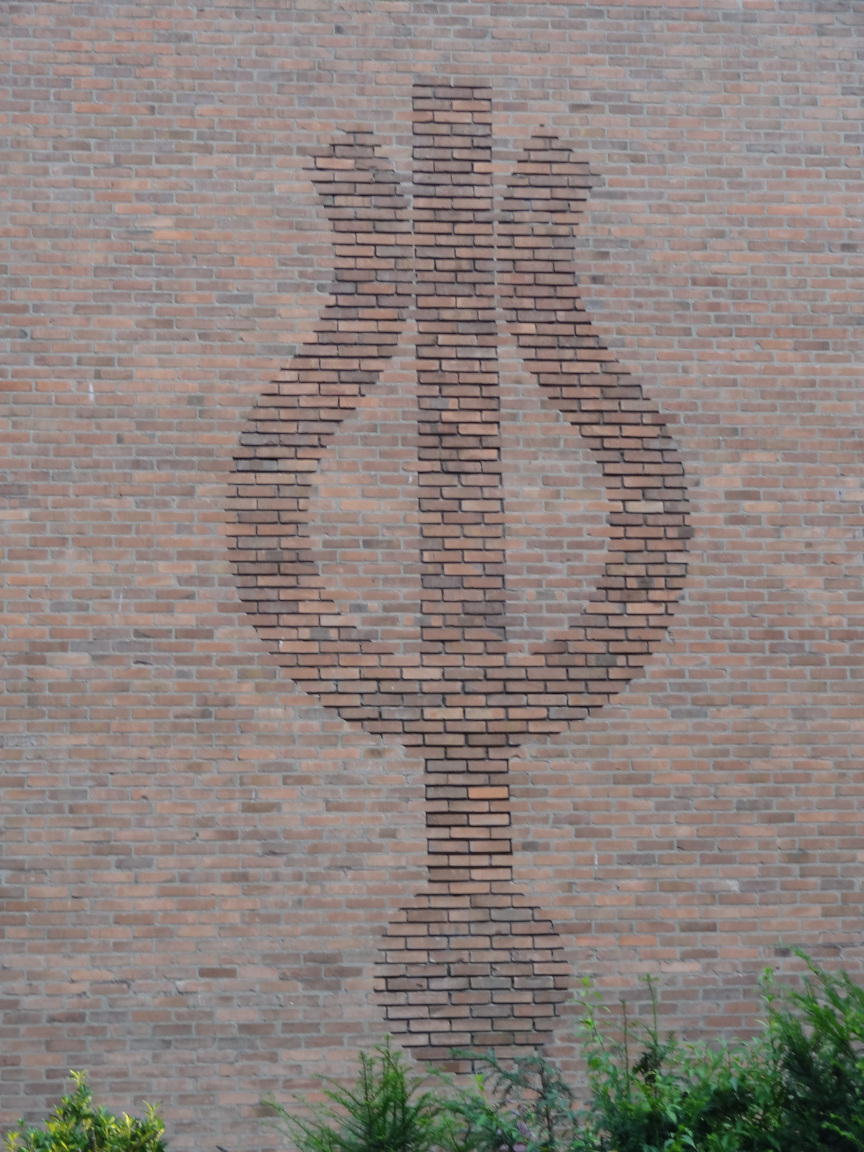
Stylized Neptune symbol (orb base)

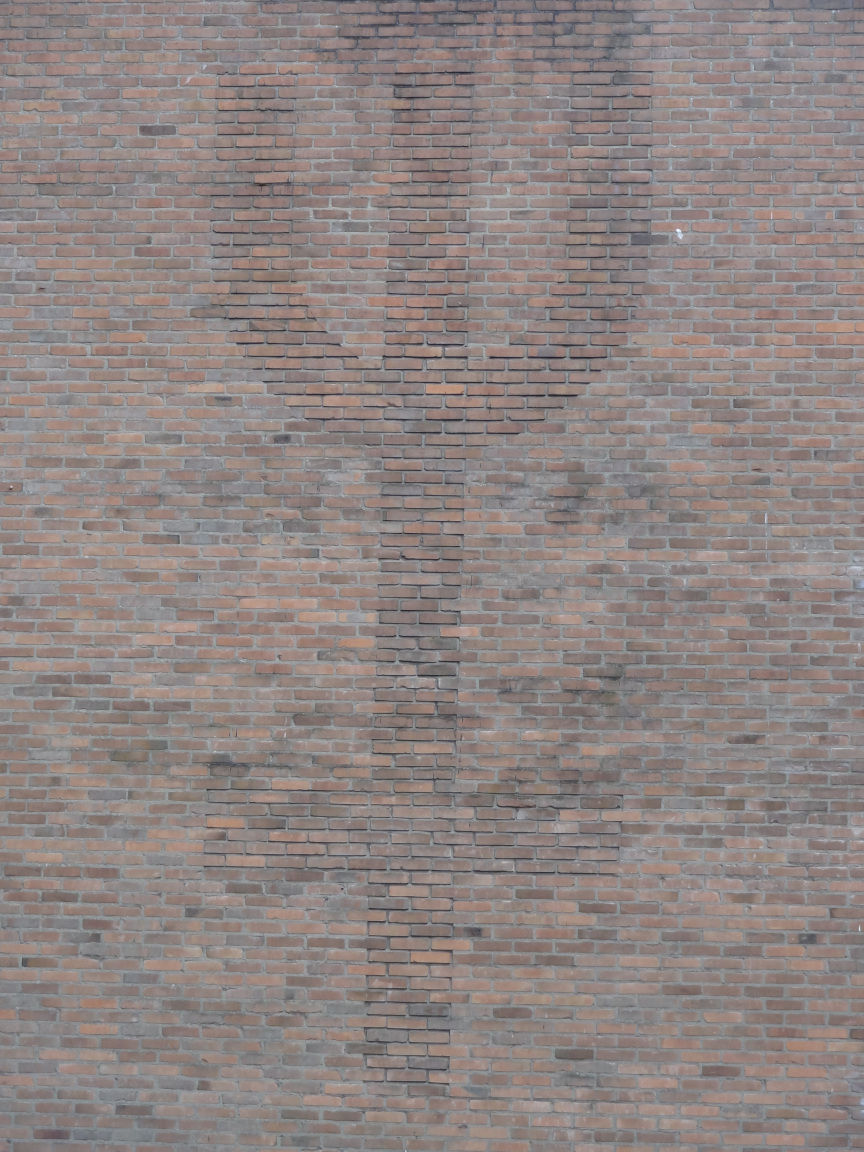
Stylized Neptune symbol (cross base)

⯉, the obsolete Le Verrier monogram for Neptune

=== Pluto ===
Bident symbol for Pluto

Percival Lowell monogram for Pluto

Pluto was almost universally considered a planet from its discovery in 1930 until its re-classification as a dwarf planet (planetoid) by the IAU in 2006. Planetary geologists and astrologers continue to treat it as a planet. The original planetary symbol for Pluto was, a monogram of the letters P and L. Astrologers generally use a bident with an orb. NASA has used the bident symbol since Pluto's reclassification. These symbols are encoded as U+2647 ♇ PLUTO and U+2BD3 ⯓ PLUTO FORM TWO.

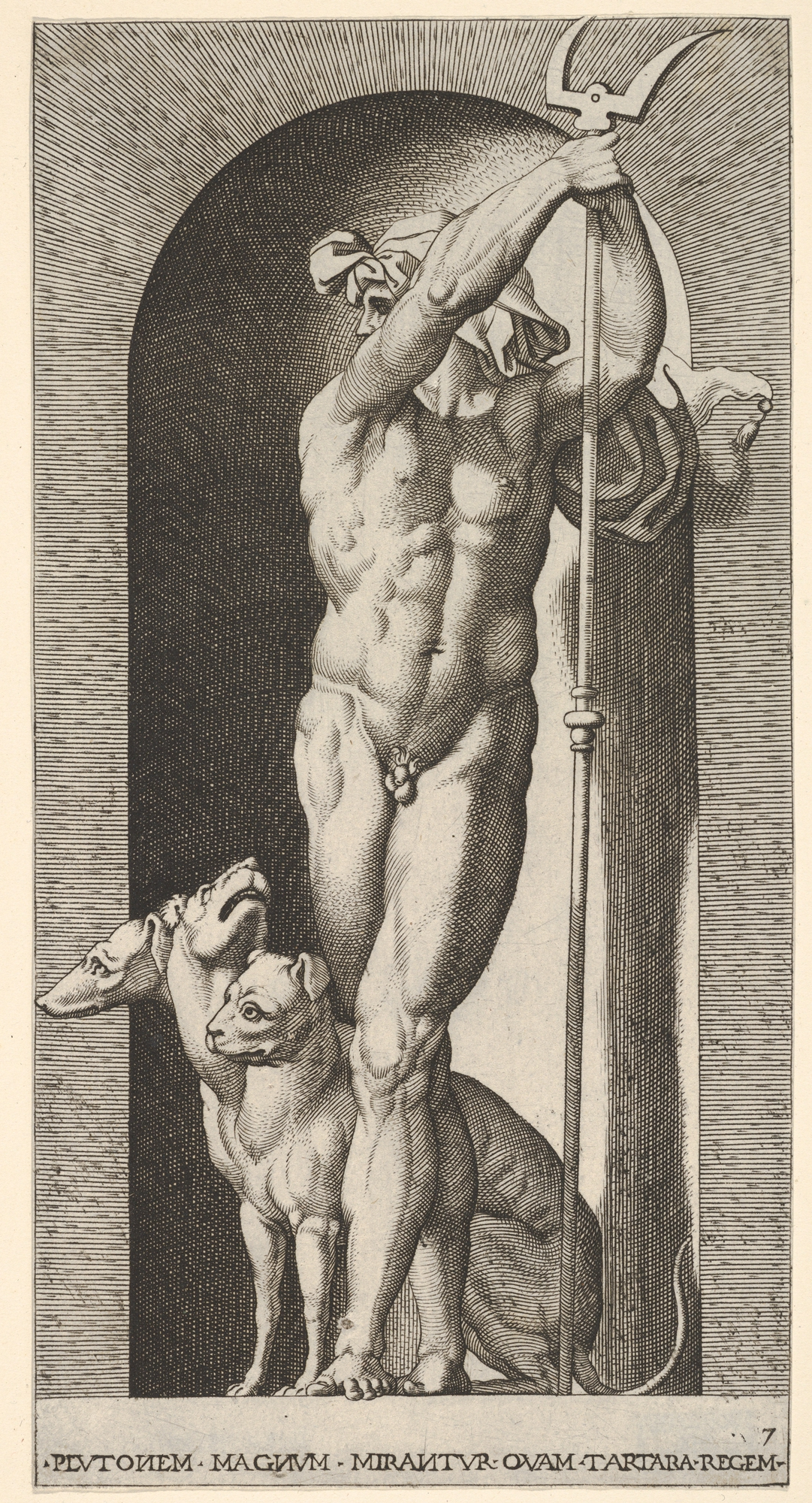
Pluto holding a bident

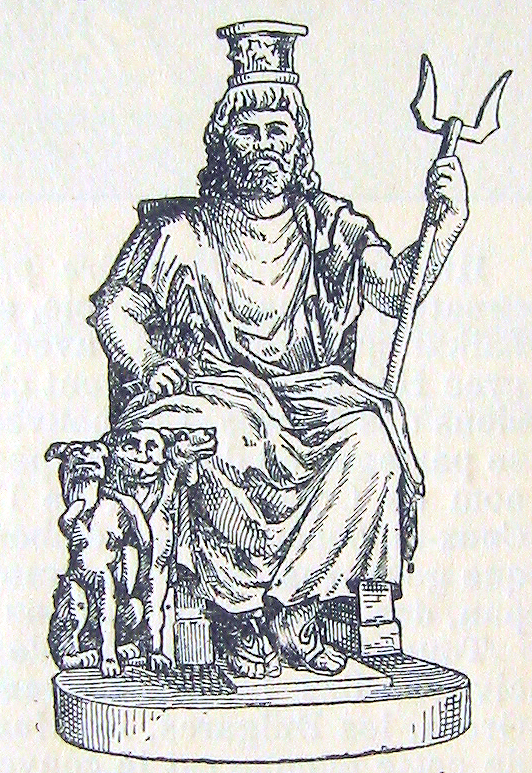
Pluto with a bident

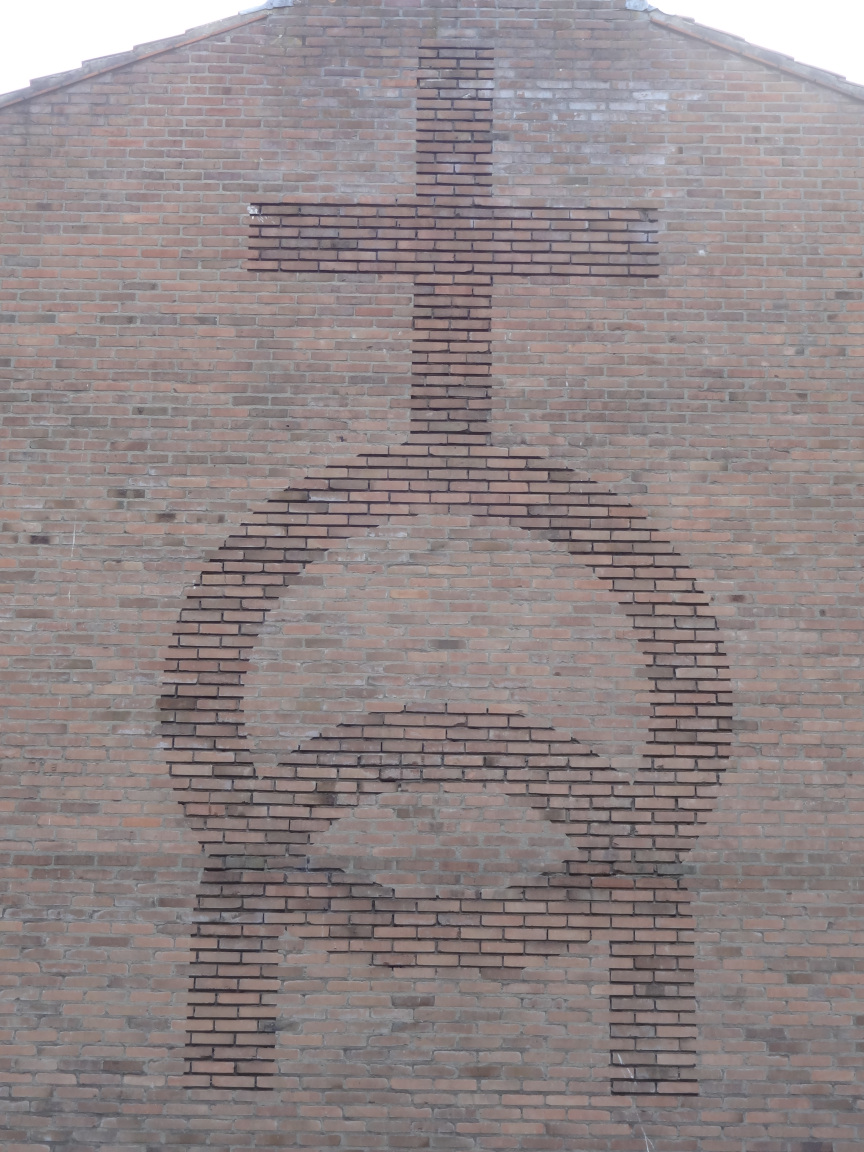
Pluto symbol stylized as an inverted Mercury

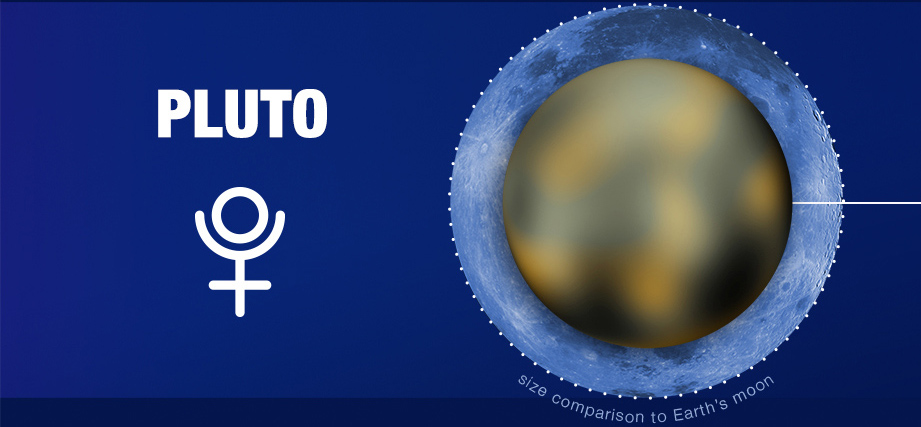
Pluto compared in size to Earth's moon in a NASA publication
⯖, an astrological symbol used for Pluto in Germany and Denmark, representing Pluto's orbit crossing Neptune's

⯔, an astrological symbol used in the Mediterranean and Germany. The globe at bottom may be larger or omitted altogether.

== Minor planets ==
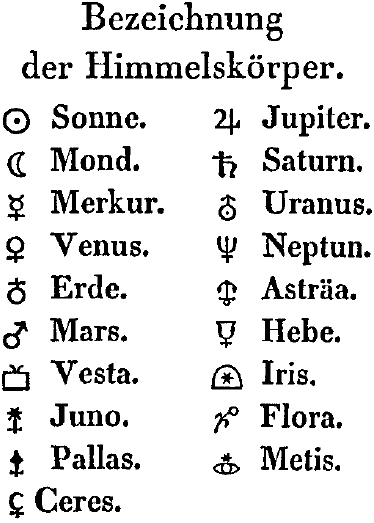
"Designation of celestial bodies" in a German almanac printed 1850

In the 19th century, planetary symbols for the major asteroids were also in use, including 1 Ceres (a reaper's sickle, encoded U+26B3 ⚳ CERES), 2 Pallas (a lance, U+26B4 ⚴ PALLAS) and 3 Juno (a sceptre, encoded U+26B5 ⚵ JUNO). Encke (1850) used symbols for 5 Astraea, 6 Hebe, 7 Iris, 8 Flora and 9 Metis in the Berliner Astronomisches Jahrbuch.

In the late 20th century, astrologers abbreviated the symbol for 4 Vesta (the sacred fire of Vesta, encoded U+26B6 ⚶ VESTA), and introduced new symbols for 5 Astraea (a stylised % sign, shift-5 on QWERTY keyboards for asteroid 5), 10 Hygiea encoded U+2BDA ⯚ HYGIEA) and for 2060 Chiron, discovered in 1977 (a key, U+26B7 ⚷ CHIRON). Chiron's symbol was adapted as additional centaurs were discovered; symbols for 5145 Pholus and 7066 Nessus have been encoded in Unicode. The abbreviated Vesta symbol is now universal, and the astrological symbol for Pluto has been used astronomically for Pluto as a dwarf planet.

In the early 21st century, symbols for the trans-Neptunian dwarf planets have been given Unicode codepoints, particularly Eris (the hand of Eris, ⯰, but also ⯱), Sedna, Haumea, Makemake, Gonggong, Quaoar and Orcus which are in Unicode. All (except Eris, for which the hand of Eris is a traditional Discordian symbol) were devised by Denis Moskowitz, a software engineer in Massachusetts.

Other symbols have also been invented by Moskowitz, for some smaller TNOs as well as many planetary moons. (Charon in particular coincidentally matches a symbol already existing in Unicode as an astrological Pluto.) However, these have not been broadly adopted.

Unicode characters for minor planets (See Astronomical symbols § Table for additional historical symbols)
		Code point
Ceres	Media related to Ceres symbols at Wikimedia Commons	U+26B3 ⚳ CERES.
Pallas	Media related to (2) Pallas symbols at Wikimedia Commons	U+26B4 ⚴ PALLAS.
Juno	Media related to (3) Juno symbols at Wikimedia Commons	U+26B5 ⚵ JUNO.
Vesta	Media related to (4) Vesta symbols at Wikimedia Commons	U+26B6 ⚶ VESTA.
Hygiea	Media related to (10) Hygiea symbols at Wikimedia Commons	U+2BDA ⯚ HYGIEA.
Chiron	Media related to Chiron symbols at Wikimedia Commons	U+26B7 ⚷ CHIRON.
Pholus	Media related to Pholus symbols at Wikimedia Commons	U+2BDB ⯛ PHOLUS
Nessus	Media related to Nessus symbols at Wikimedia Commons	U+2BDC ⯜ NESSUS
Orcus	Media related to Orcus symbols at Wikimedia Commons	U+1F77F 🝿 ORCUS
Haumea	Media related to Haumea symbols at Wikimedia Commons	U+1F77B 🝻 HAUMEA
Quaoar	Media related to Quaoar symbols at Wikimedia Commons	U+1F77E 🝾 QUAOAR
Makemake	Media related to Makemake symbols at Wikimedia Commons	U+1F77C 🝼 MAKEMAKE
Gonggong	Media related to Gonggong symbols at Wikimedia Commons	U+1F77D 🝽 GONGGONG
Eris	Media related to Five-fingered hand of Eris at Wikimedia Commons	U+2BF0 ⯰ ERIS FORM ONE
Eris	Media related to Eris astrological symbol at Wikimedia Commons	U+2BF1 ⯱ ERIS FORM TWO (used by astrologer Henry Seltzer)
Sedna	Media related to Sedna symbols at Wikimedia Commons	U+2BF2 ⯲ SEDNA

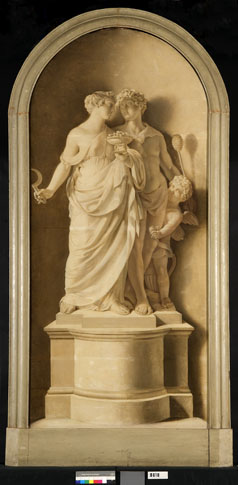
Ceres with her sickle

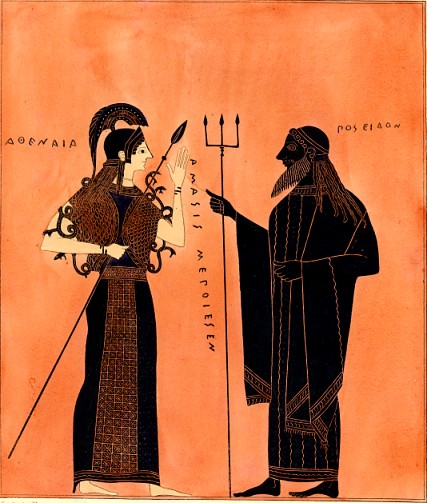
Athena (Pallas) with her lance (left)

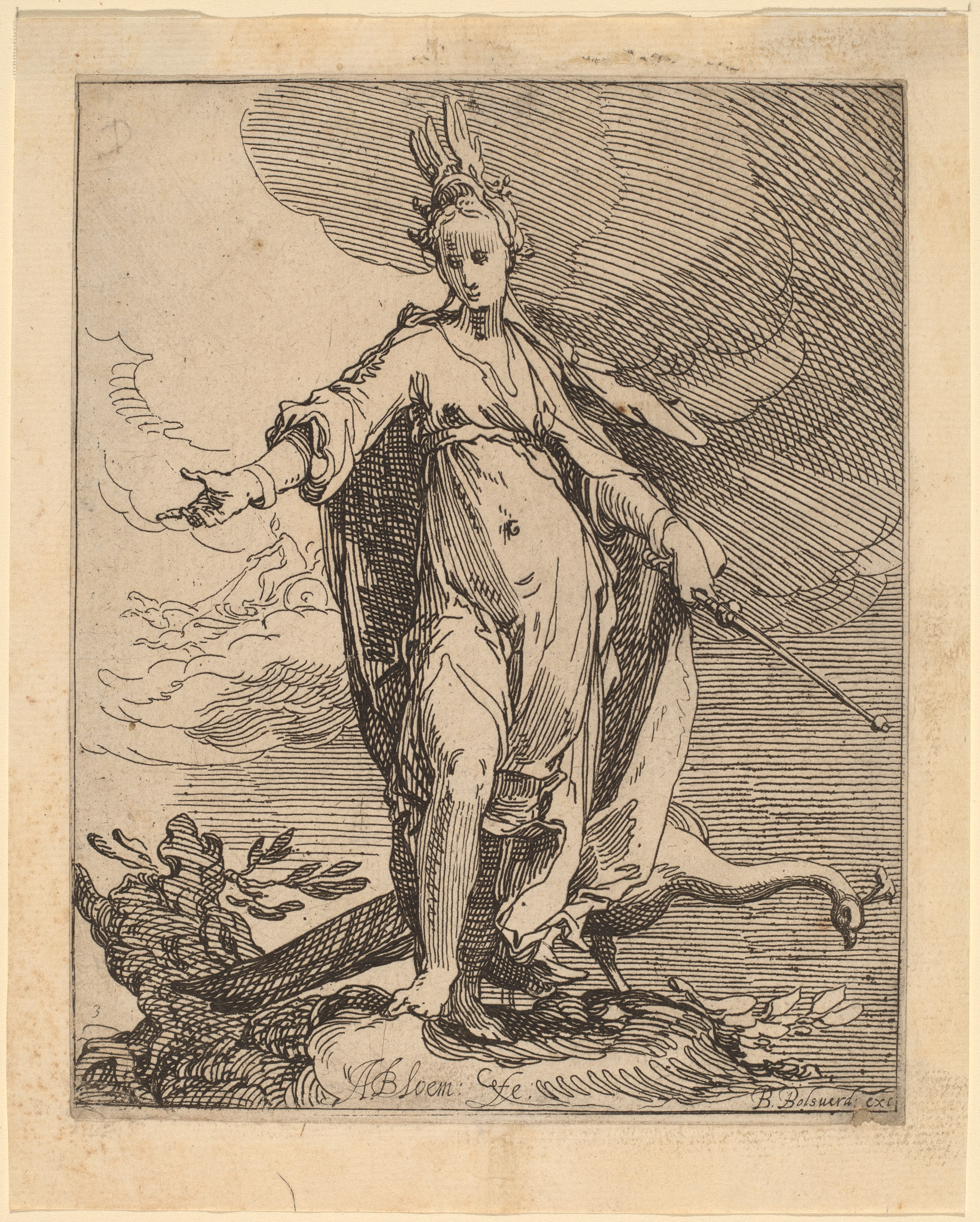
Juno with her scepter

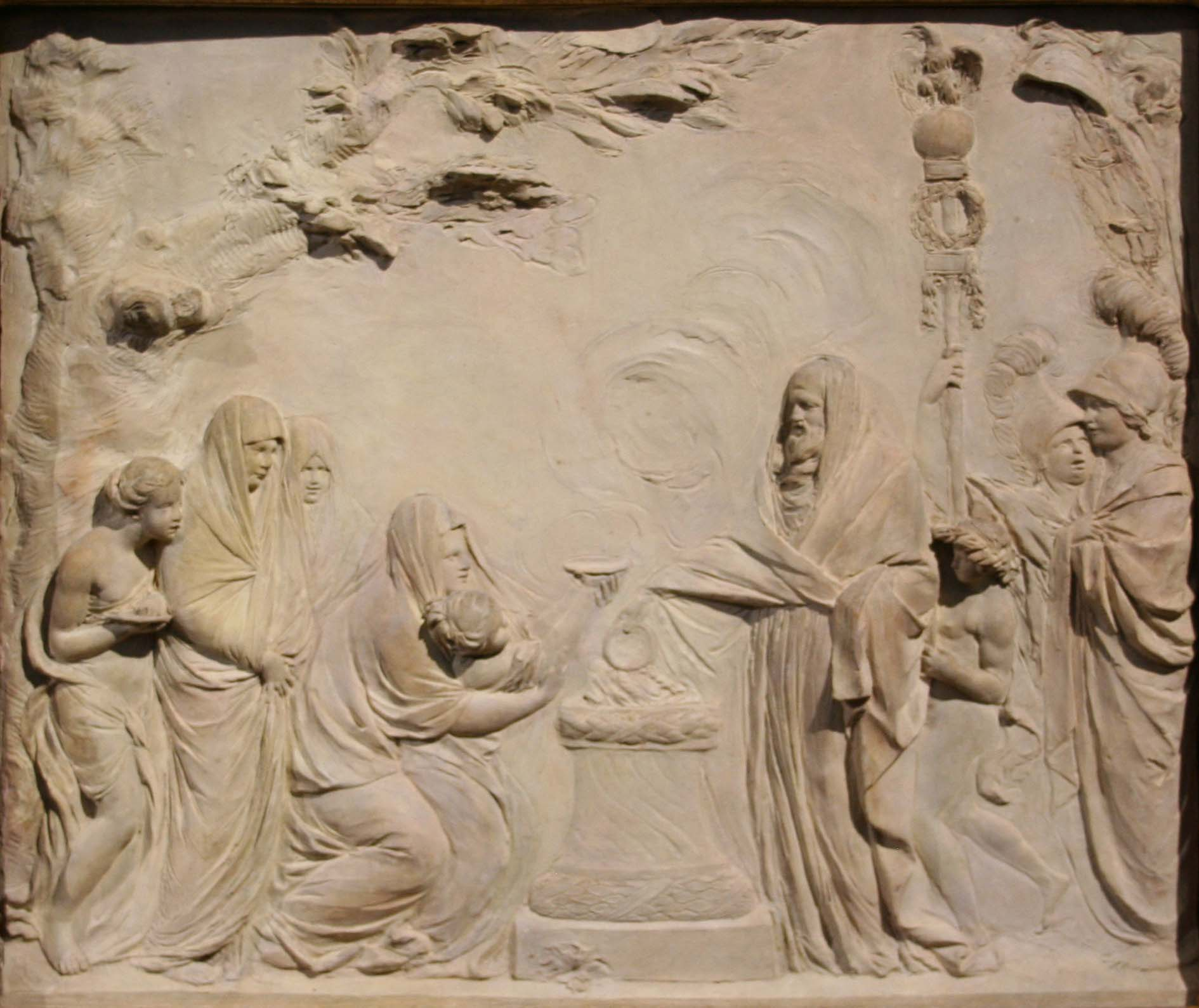
Vesta's sacred fire

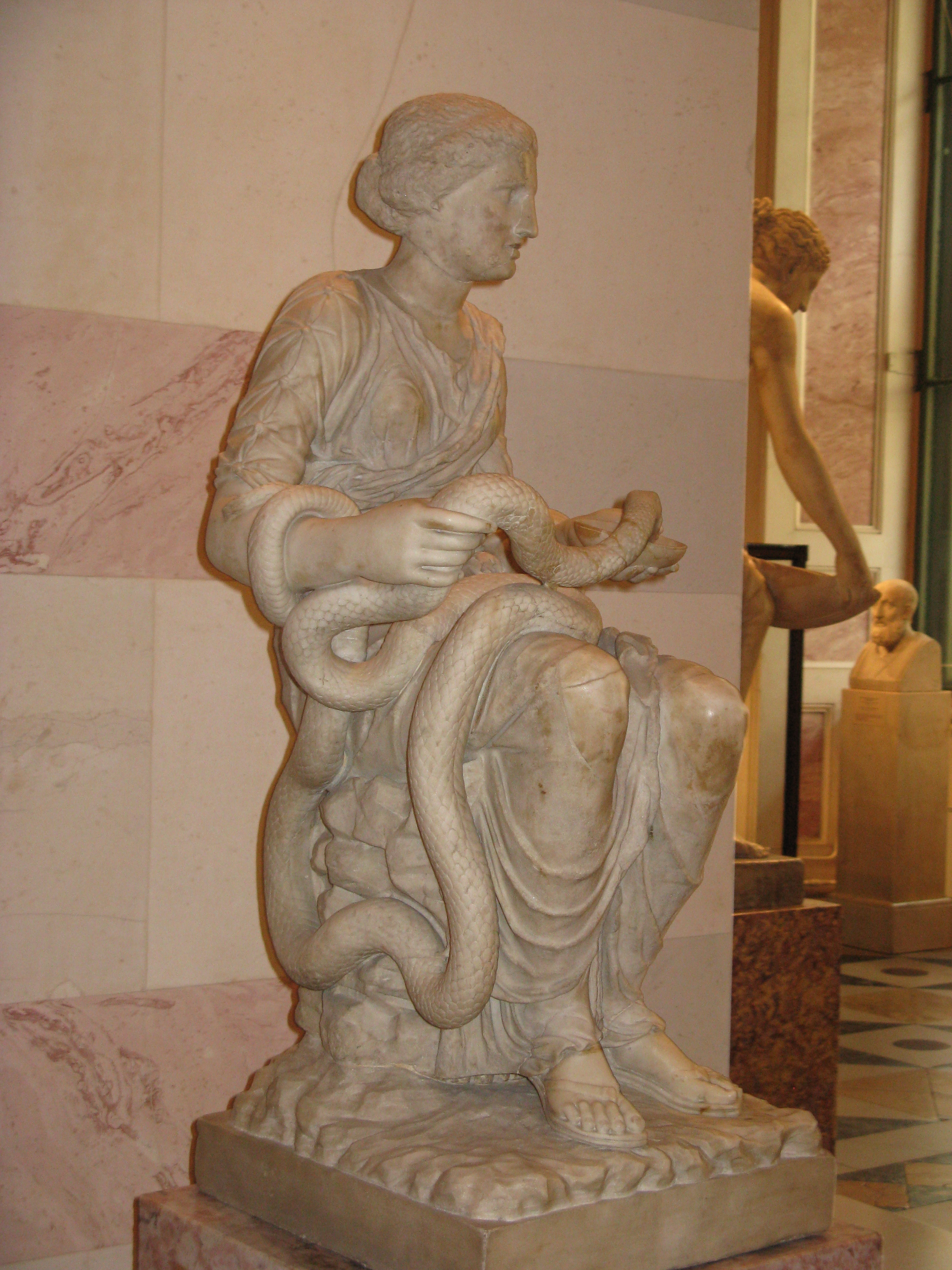
Hygiea with her snake (old astr. symbol)

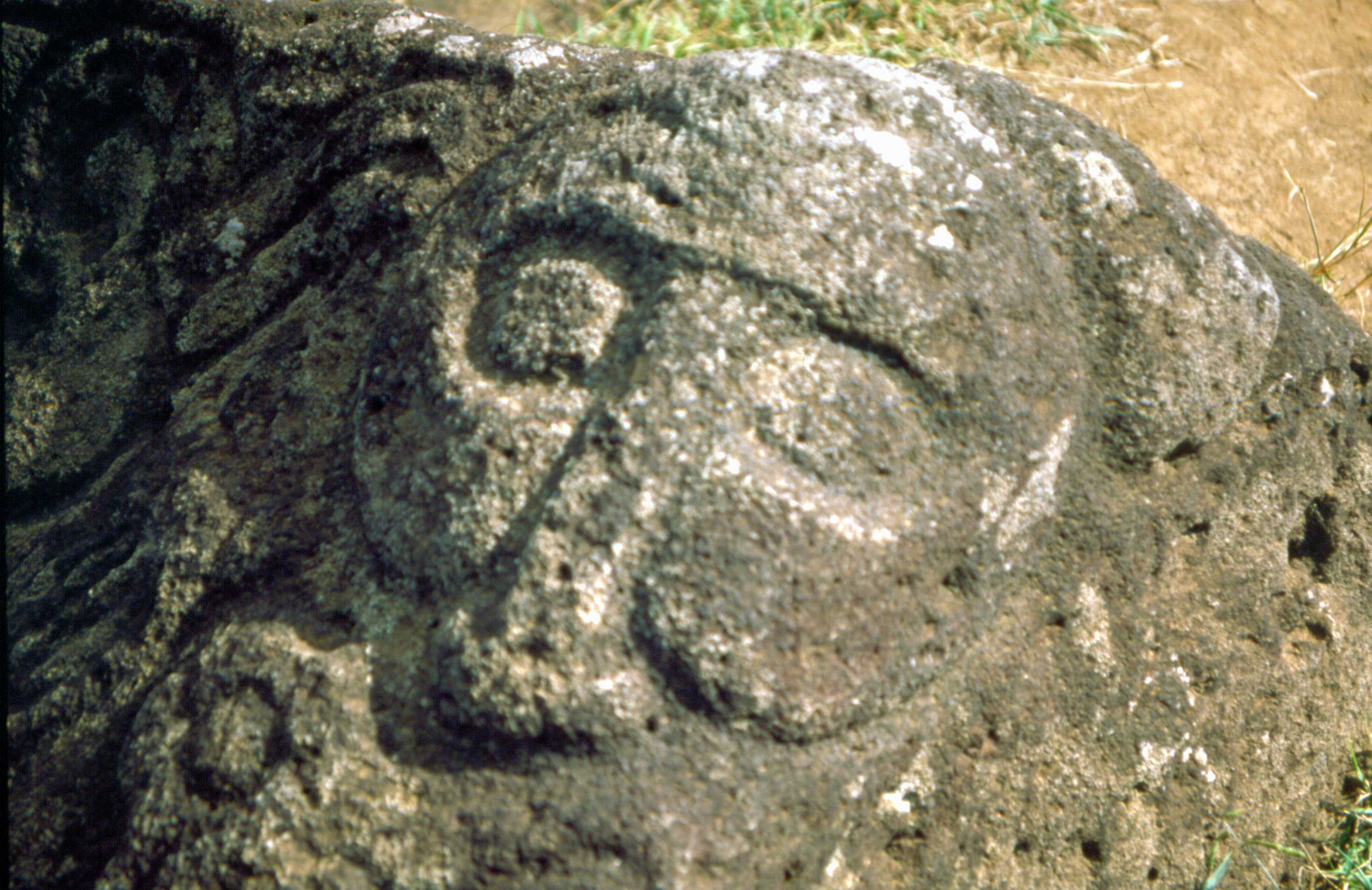
Petroglyph of Makemake

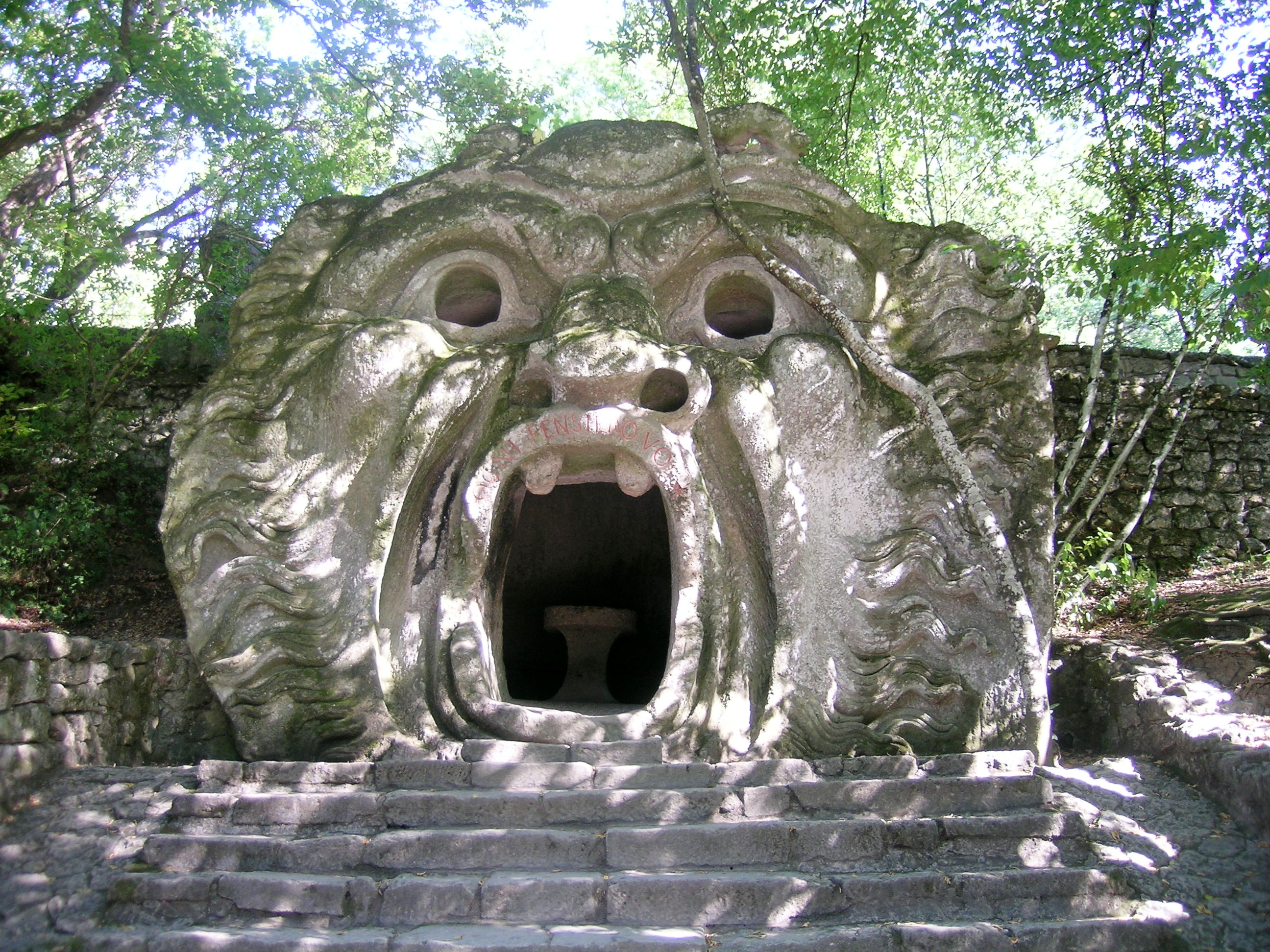
Orcus's gape

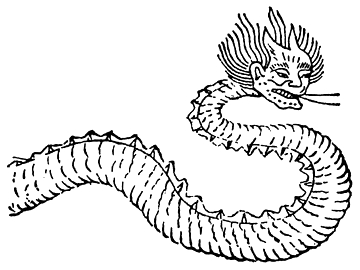
A human-headed serpent similar to depictions of Gonggong

The Hand of Eris from the Principia Discordia

=== Historical symbols ===
From 1845 to 1855, many symbols were created for newly discovered asteroids. But by 1851, the spate of discoveries had led to a general abandonment of these symbols in favour of numbering all asteroids instead.

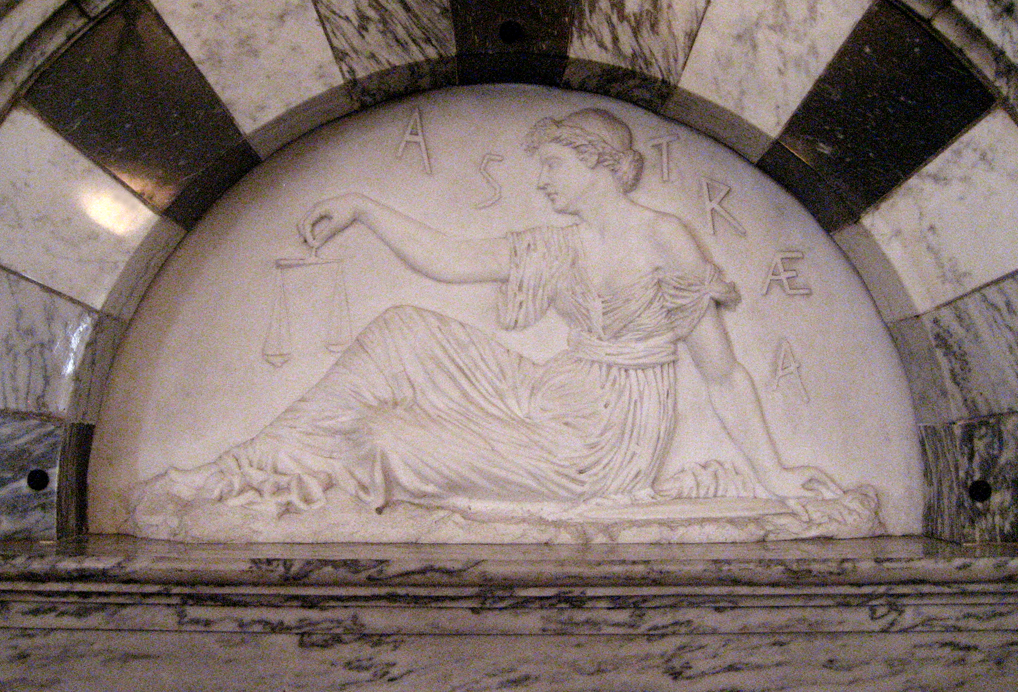
Astraea with her scales (astronomical symbol or)

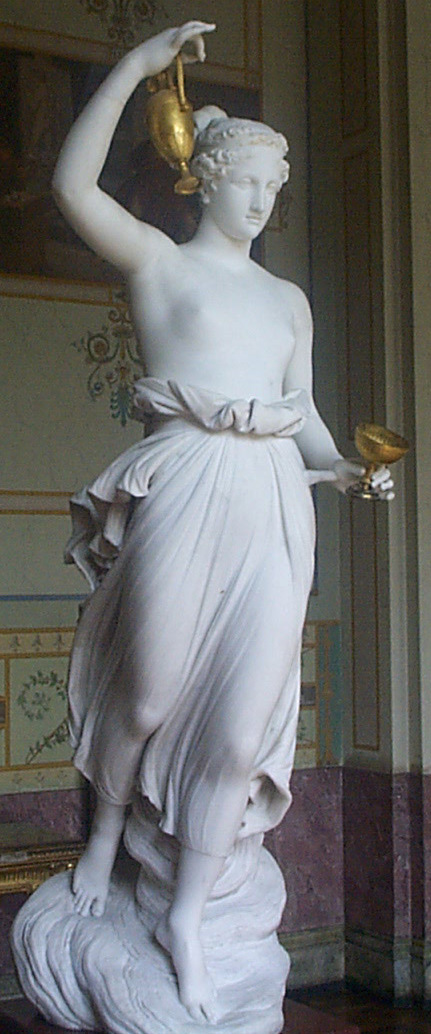
Hebe (mythology) bearing a cup (astronomical symbol)

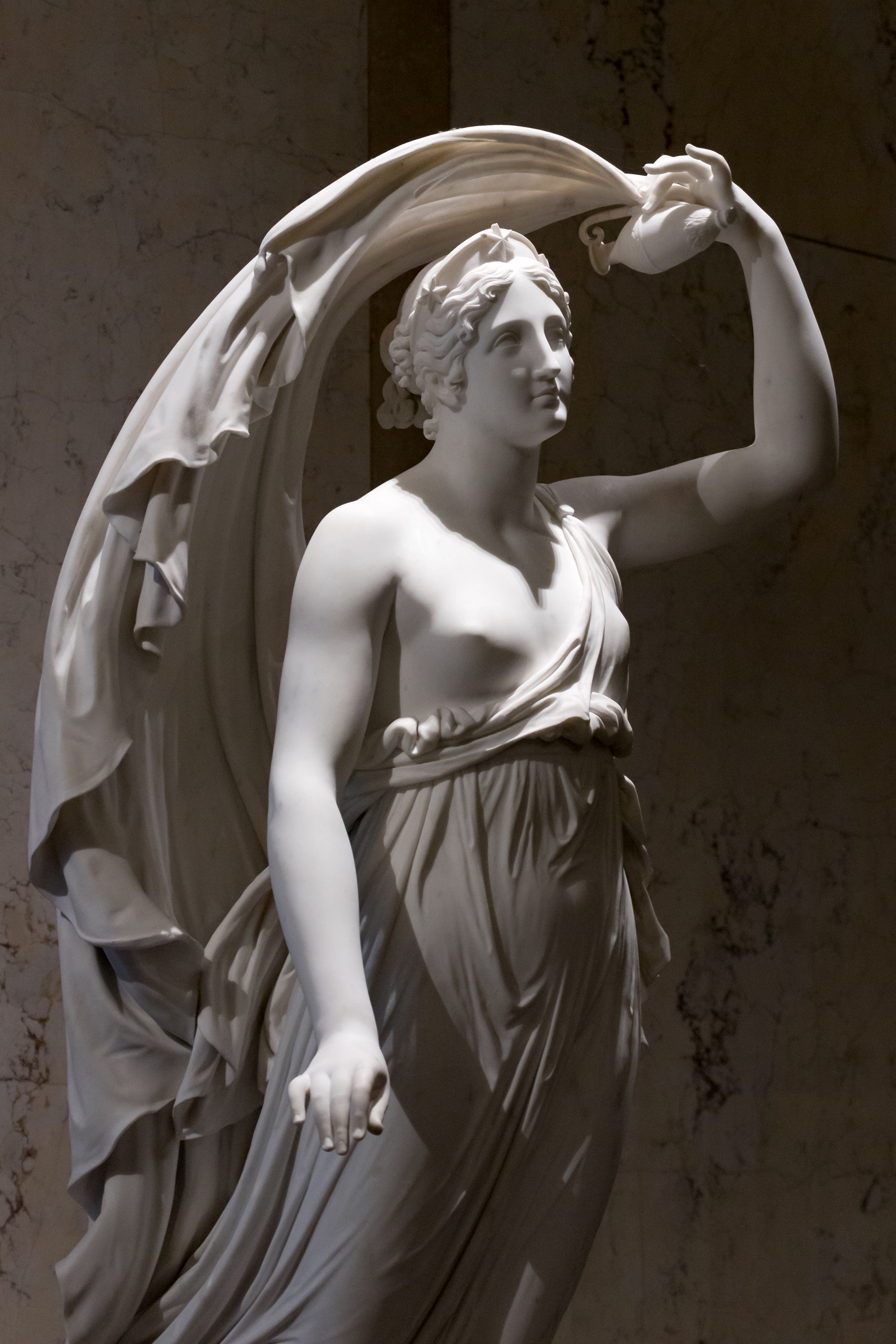
Iris as the rainbow (astronomical symbol)

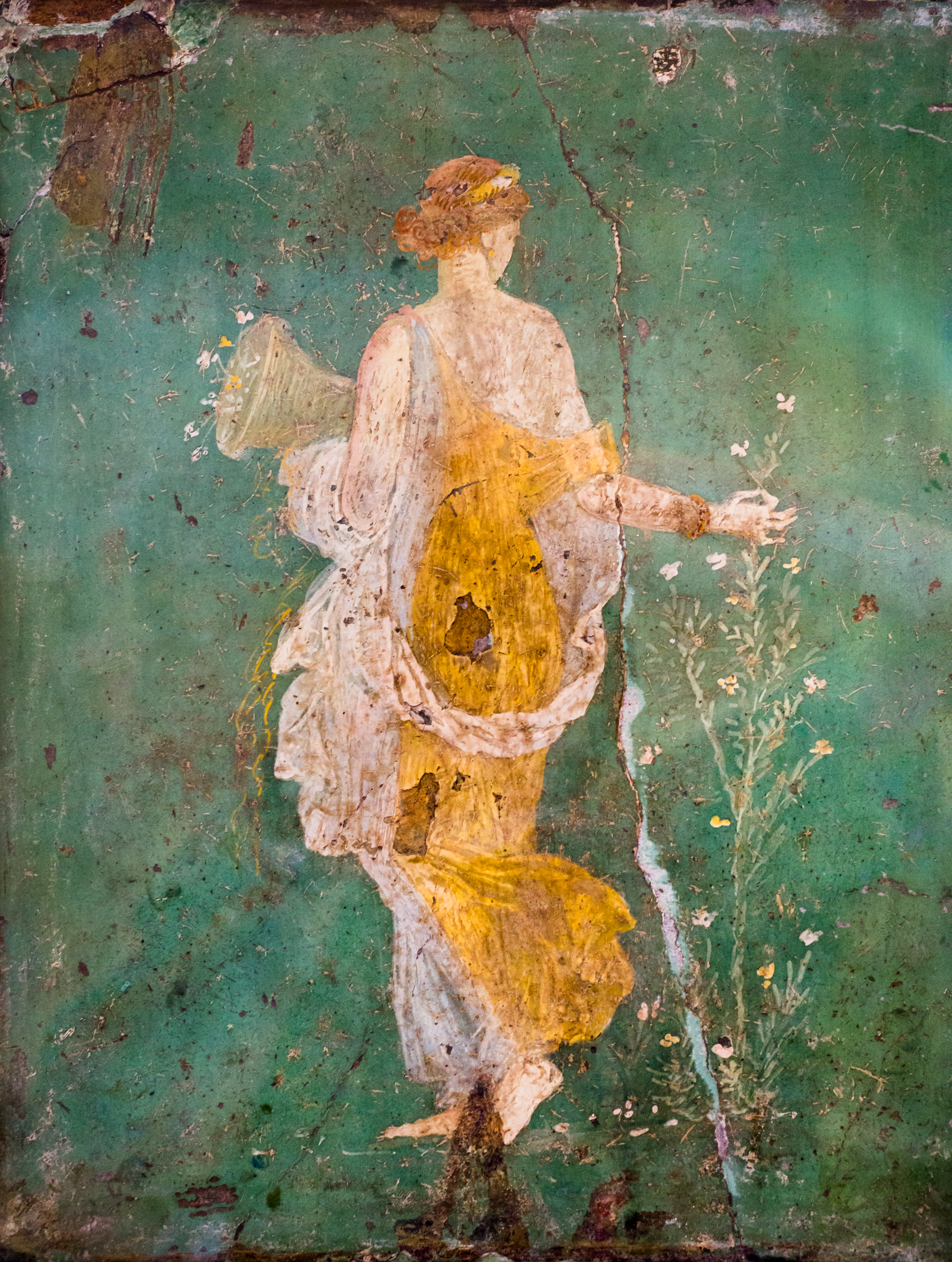
Flora dispensing flowers (astronomical symbol)

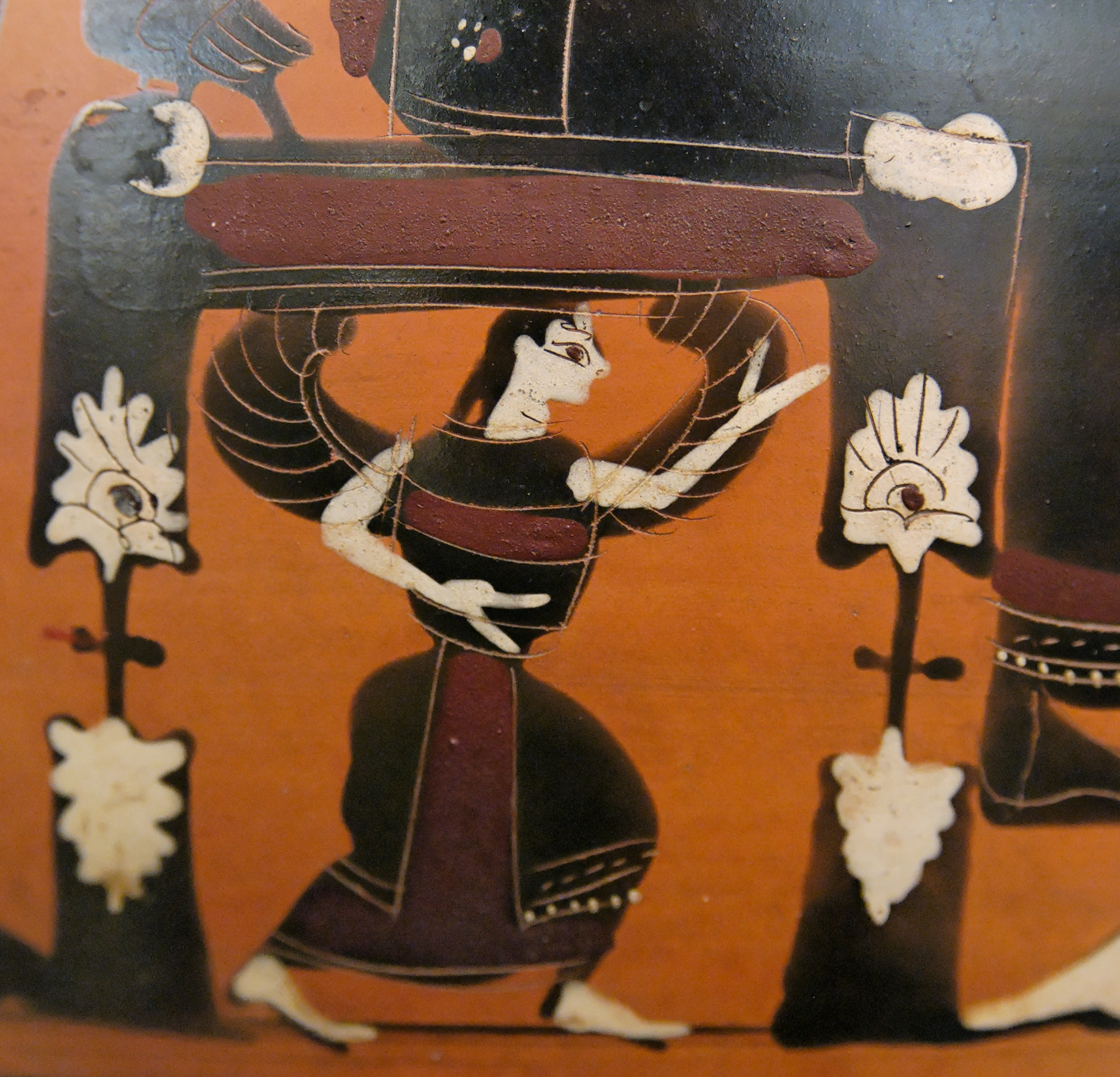
Metis (astronomical symbol)

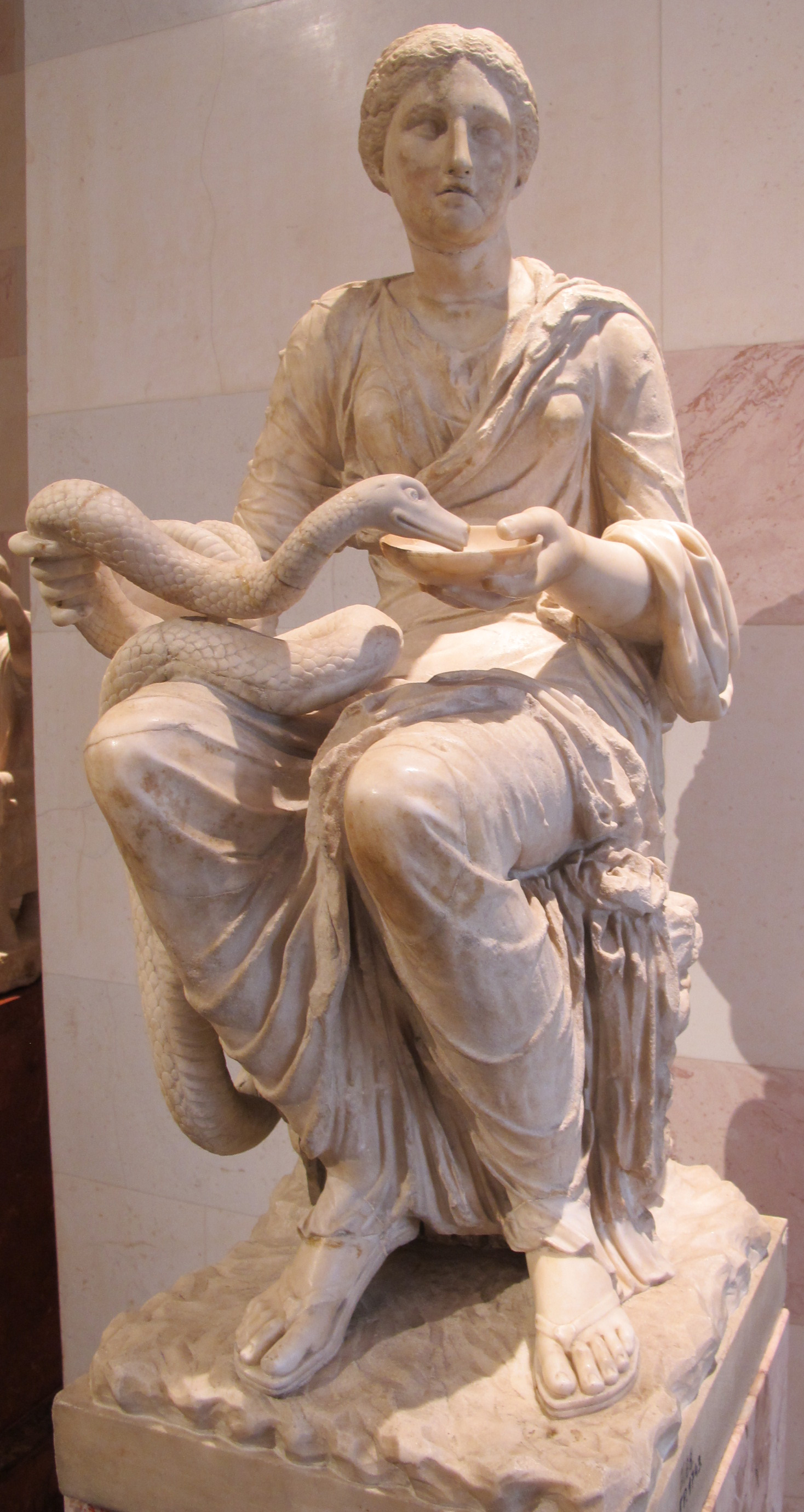
Hygiea with her snake (astronomical symbol)

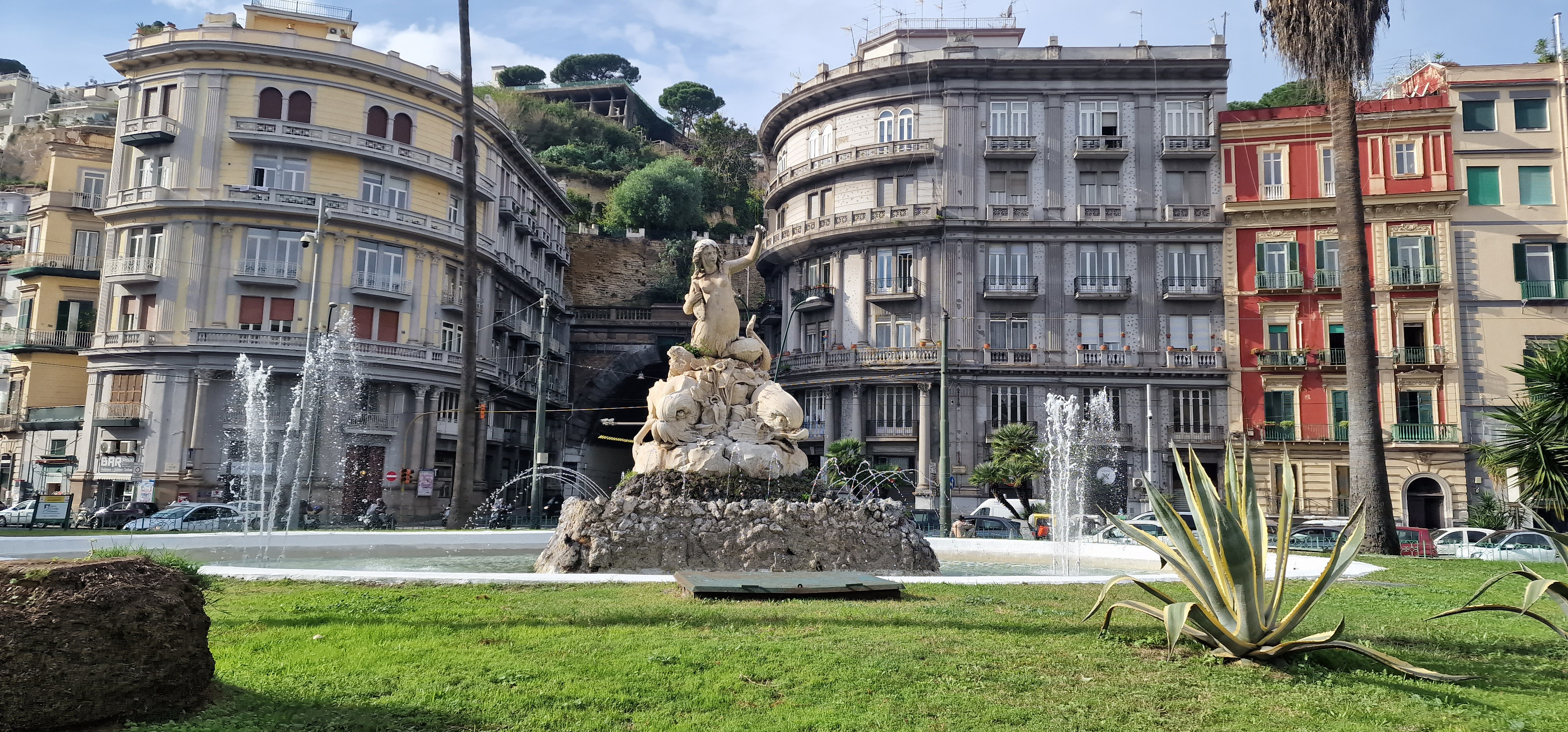
Parthenope (astronomical symbol)

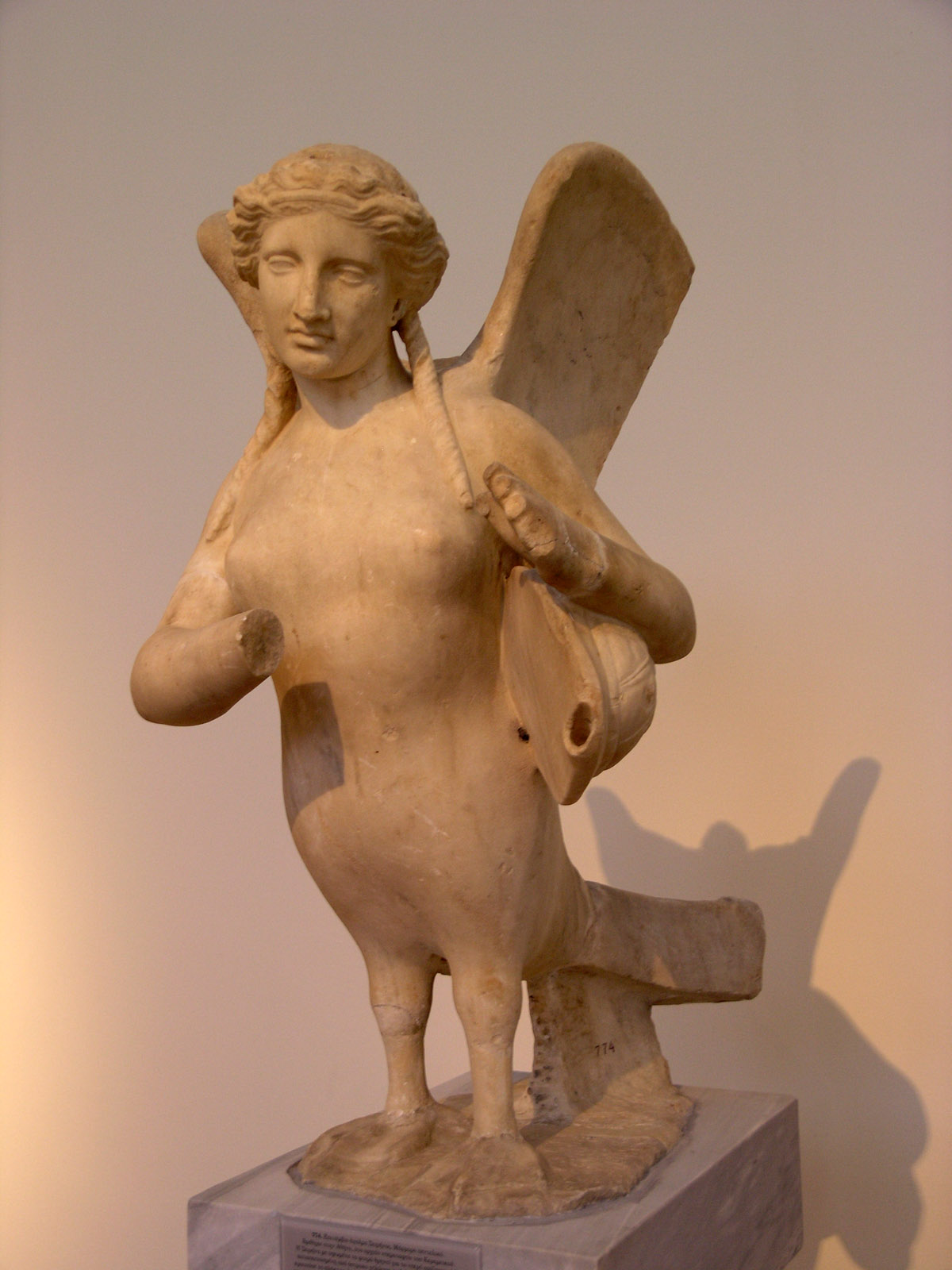
Parthenope with her lyre (astronomical symbol)

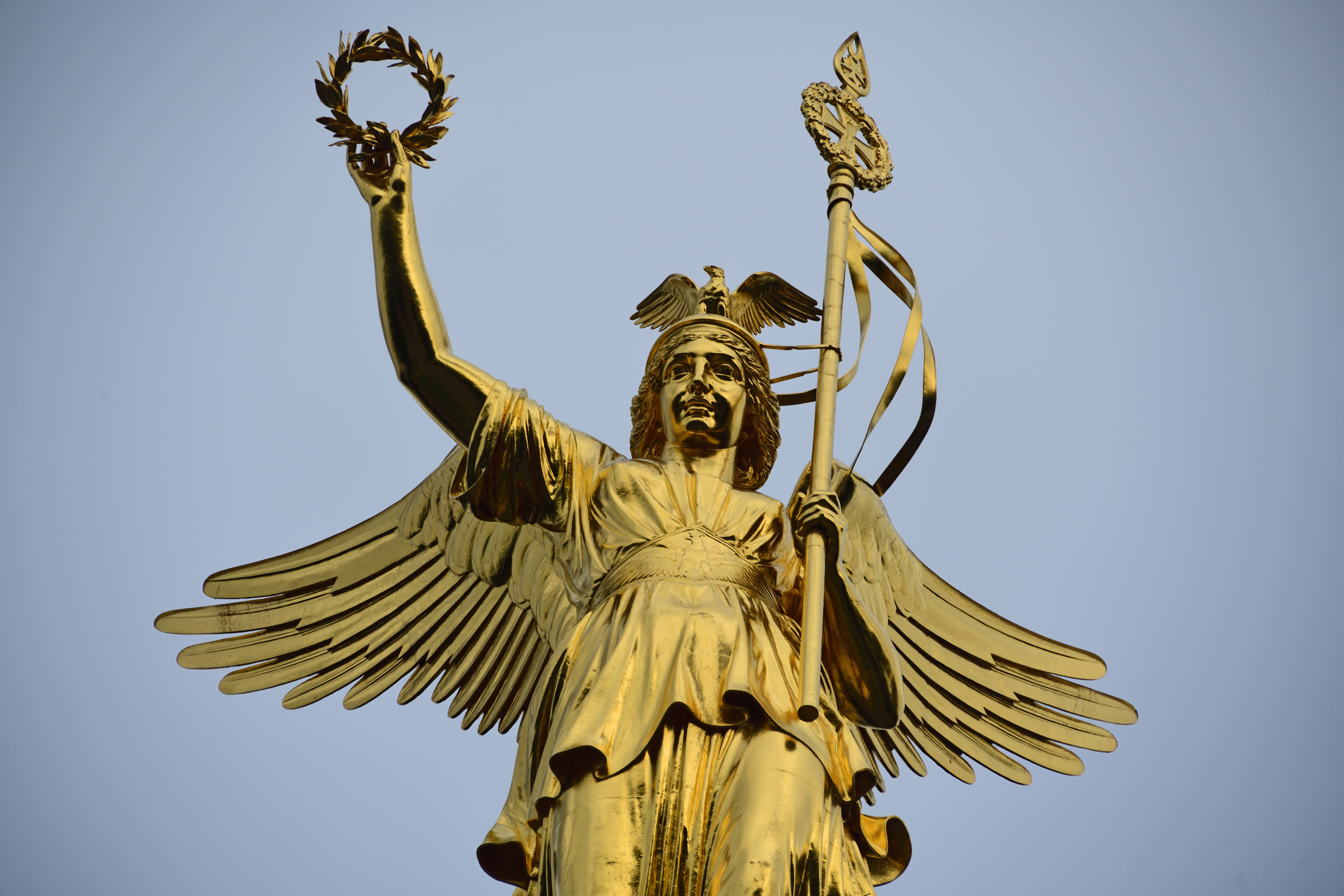
Victory (Victoria) with a laurel wreath (astronomical symbol or)

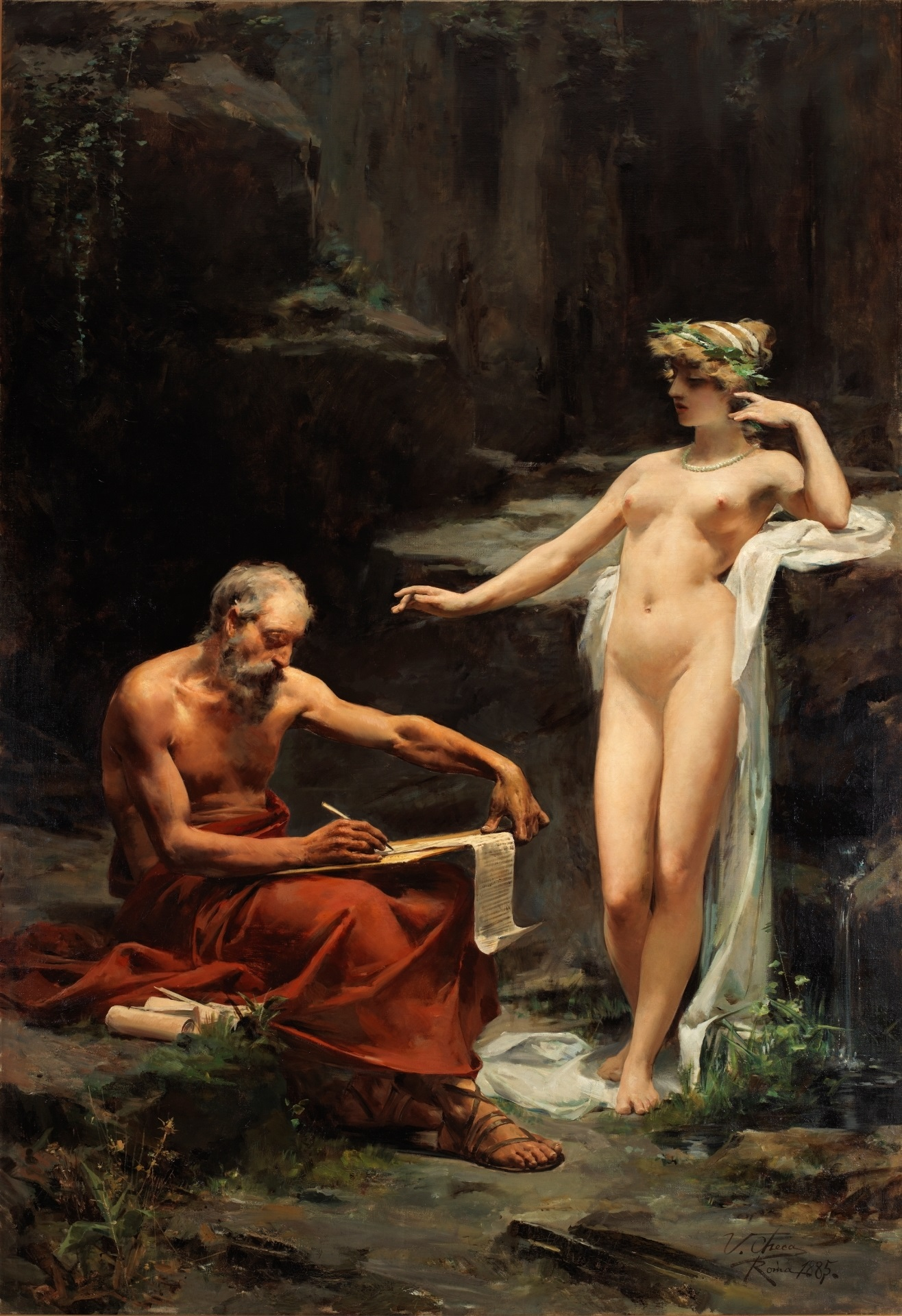
Egeria (astronomical symbol) dictating the laws of Rome to Numa Pompilius

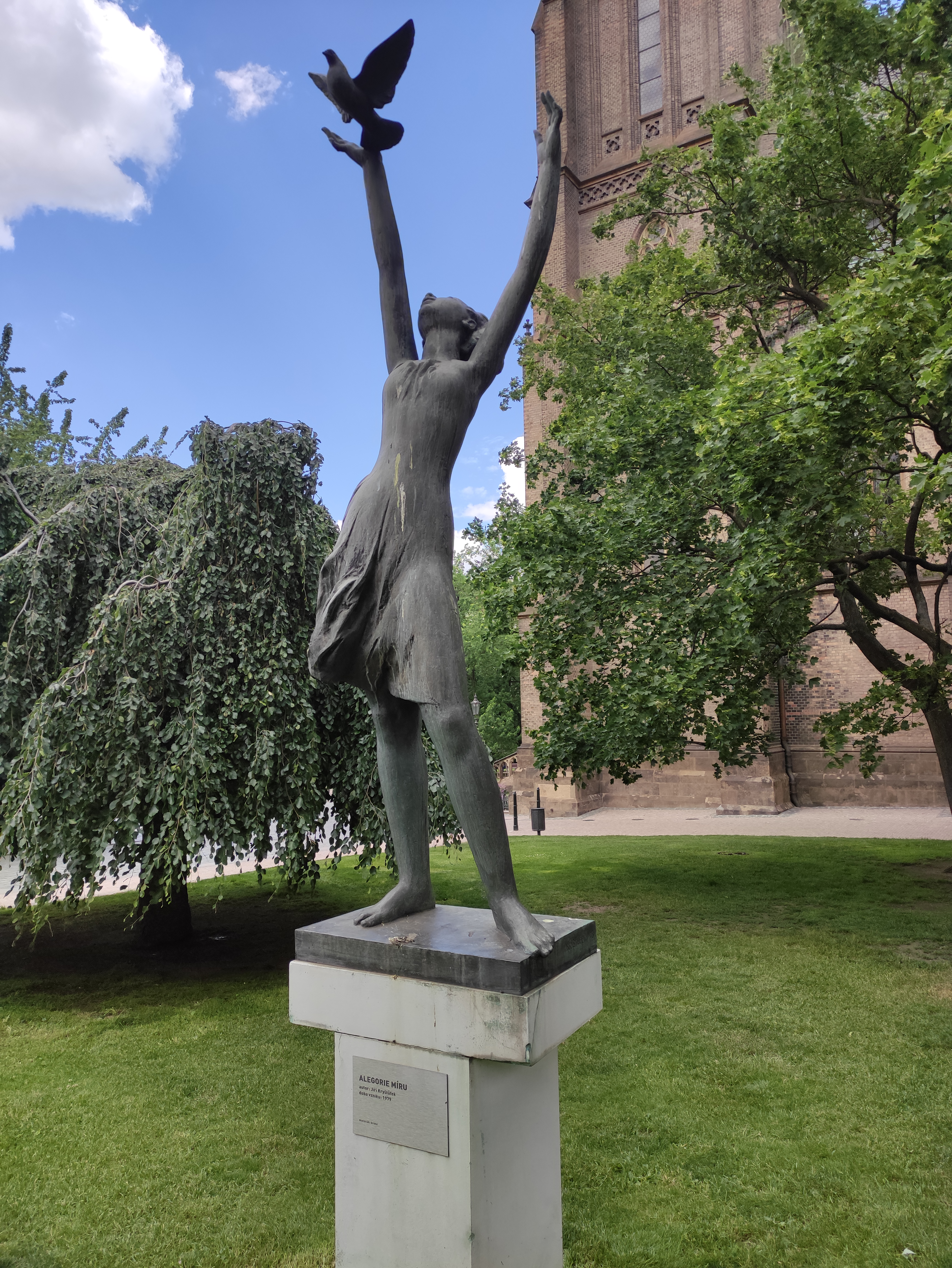
Peace (Irene) as a freed dove (astronomical symbol)

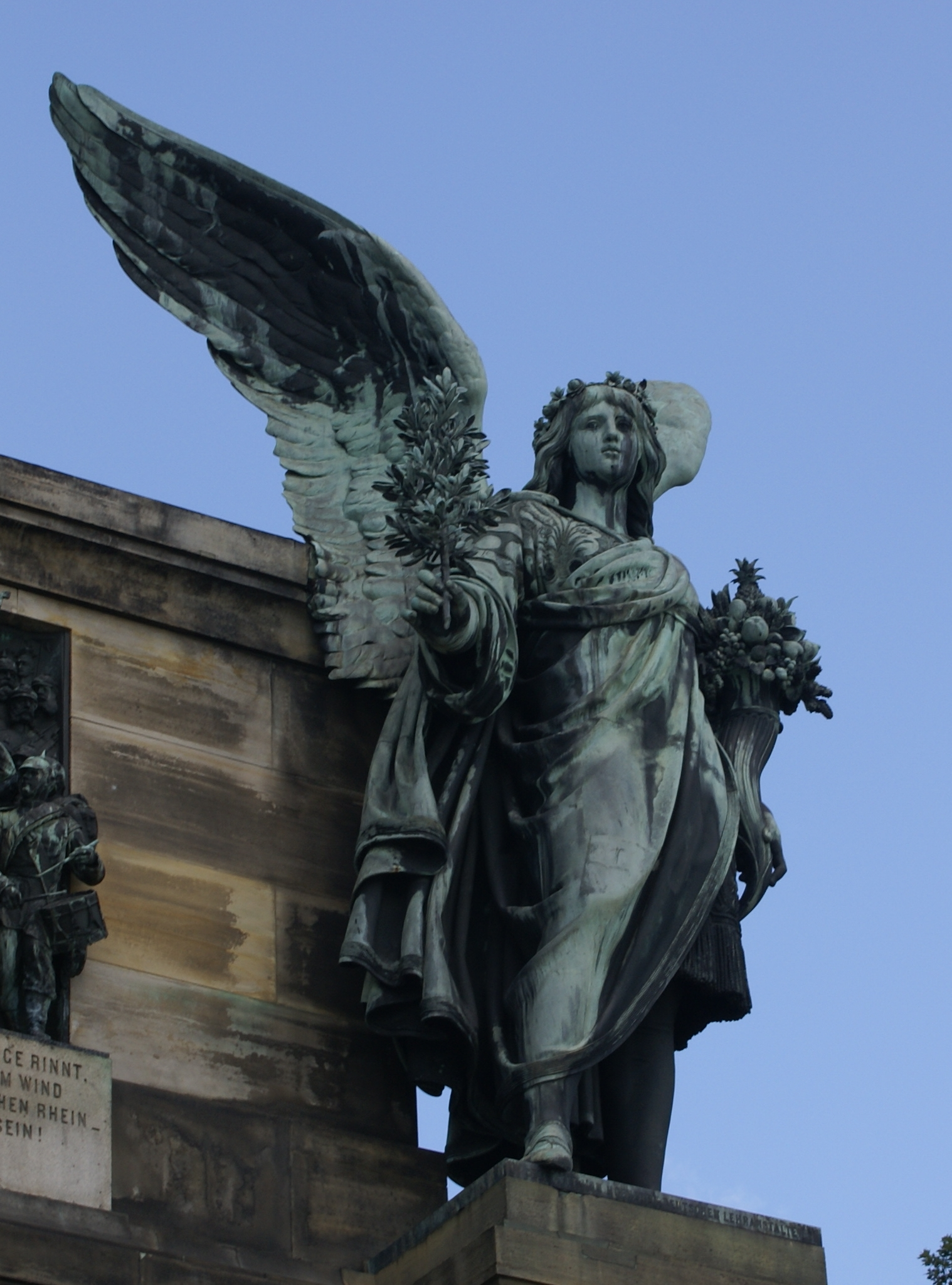
Peace with wings and an olive branch

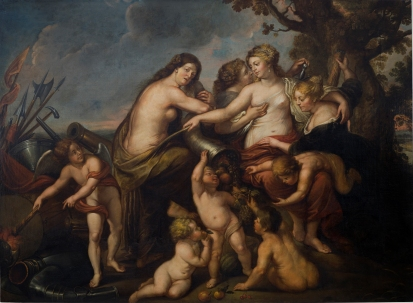
Eunomia (astronomical symbol) at left, as allegory of law and good order; Irene in centre

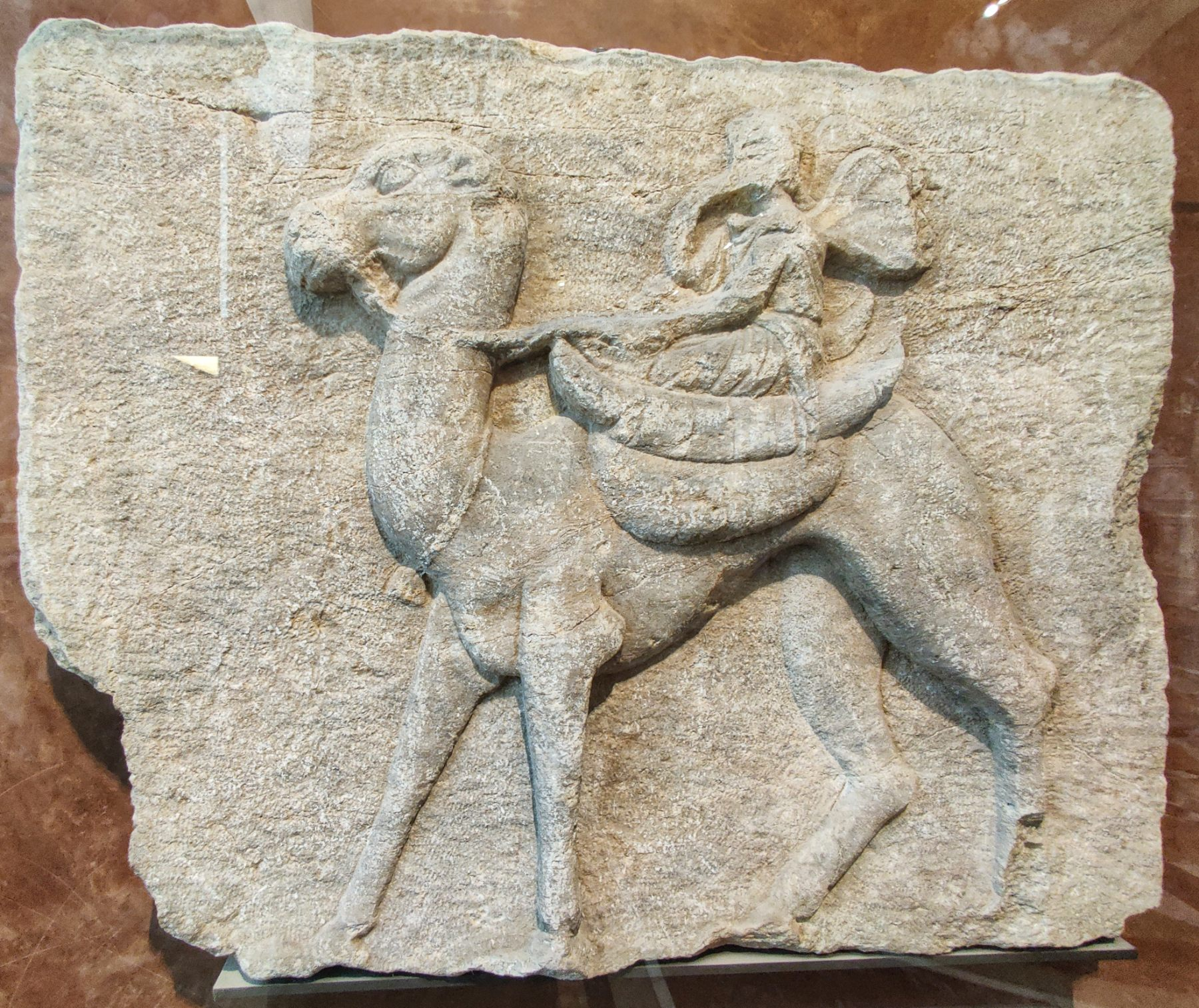
Psyche with butterfly wings (astronomical symbol)

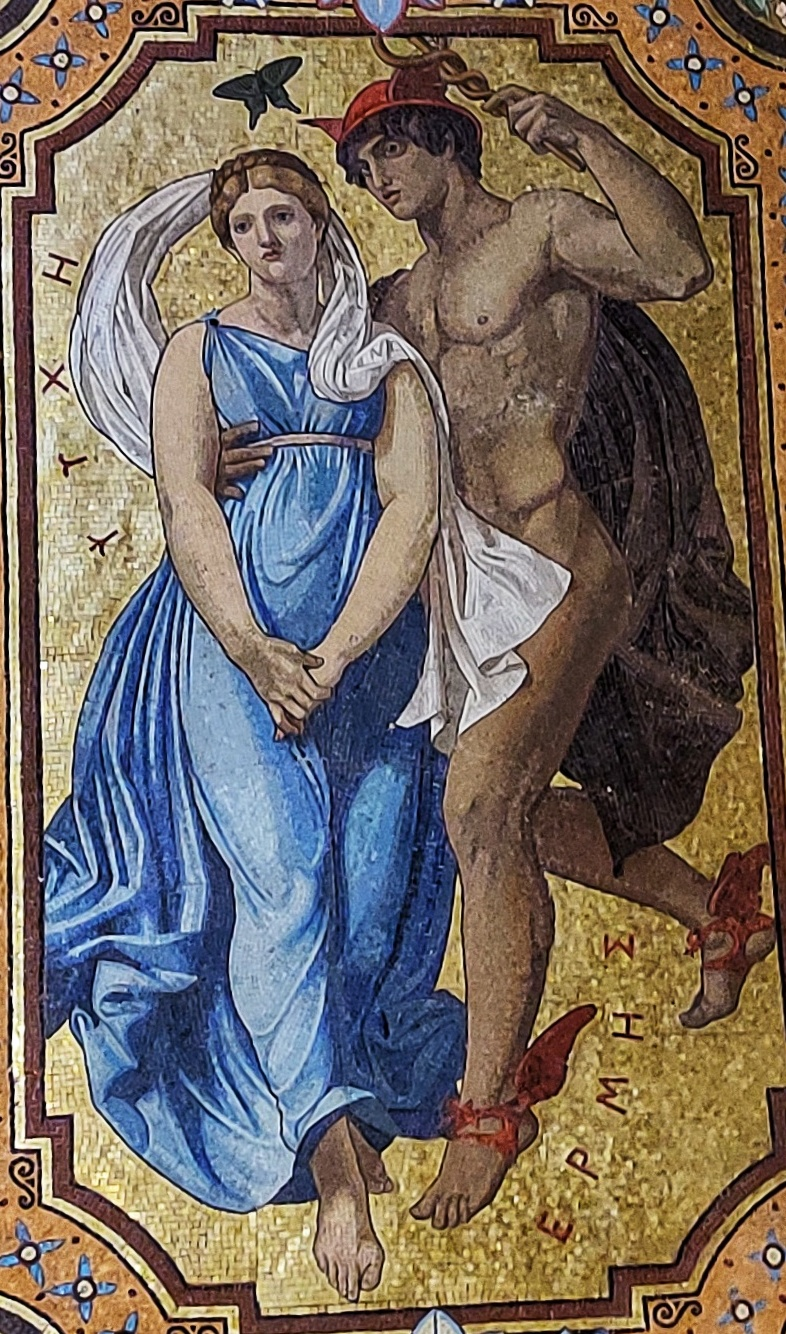
Psyche accompanied by a butterfly, and Hermes with a multiply twisted caduceus

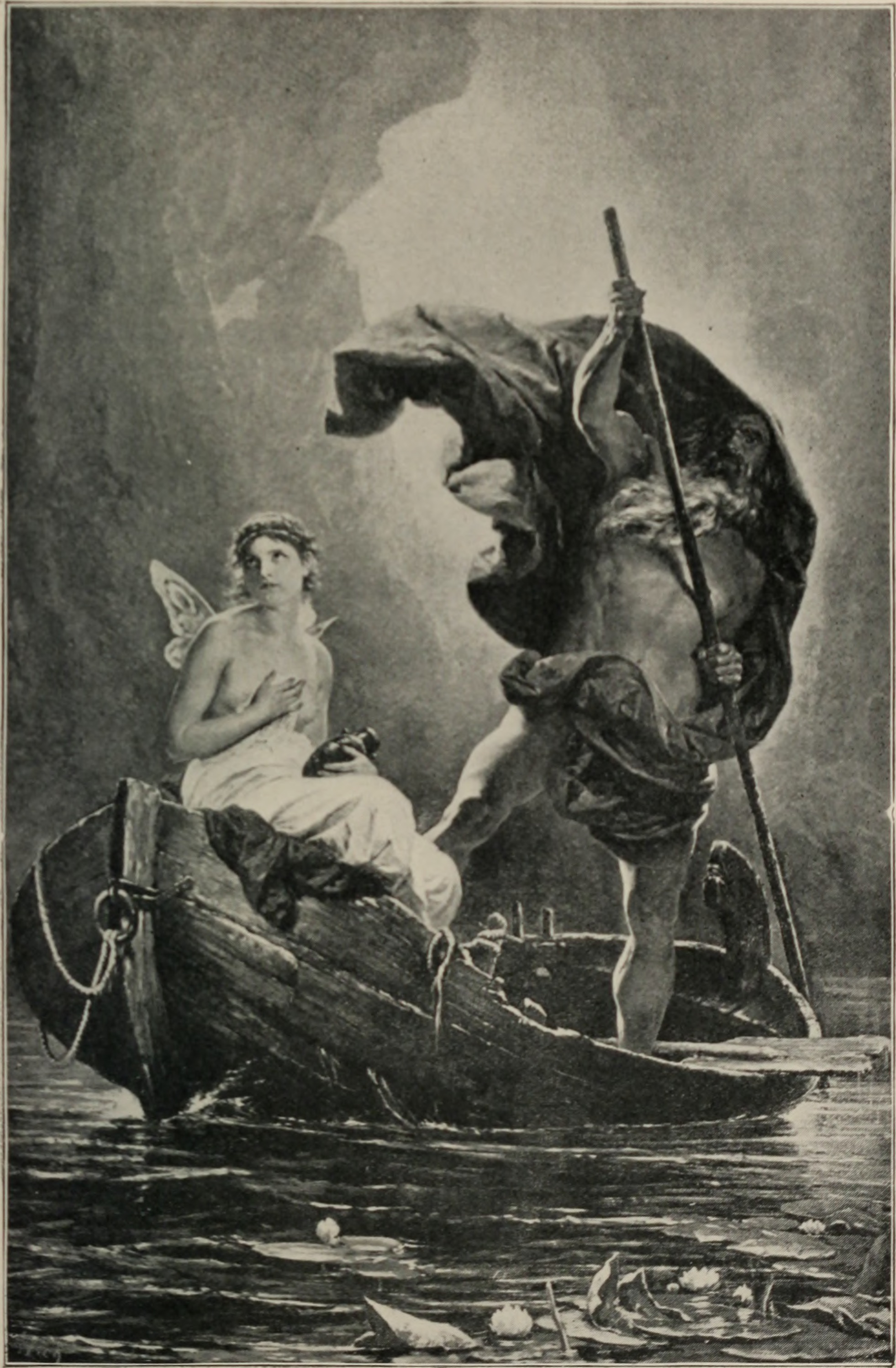
Psyche with butterfly wings, and Charon standing in his lunate boat

Insignia of the NASA Psyche mission, possibly influenced by the Psyche symbol

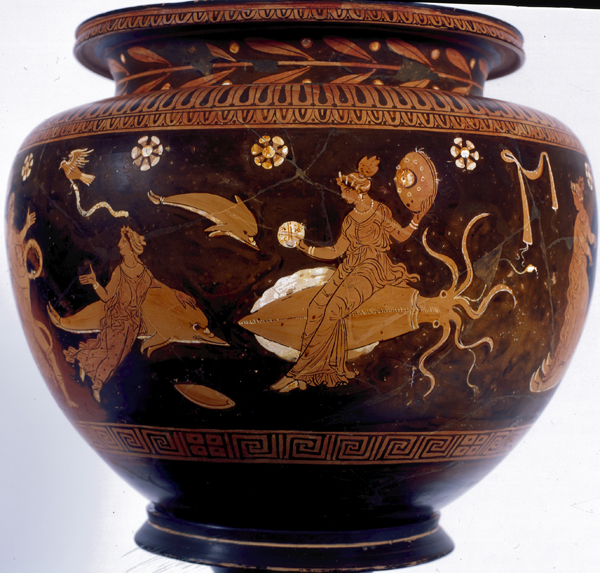
Thetis with a dolphin (astronomical symbol)

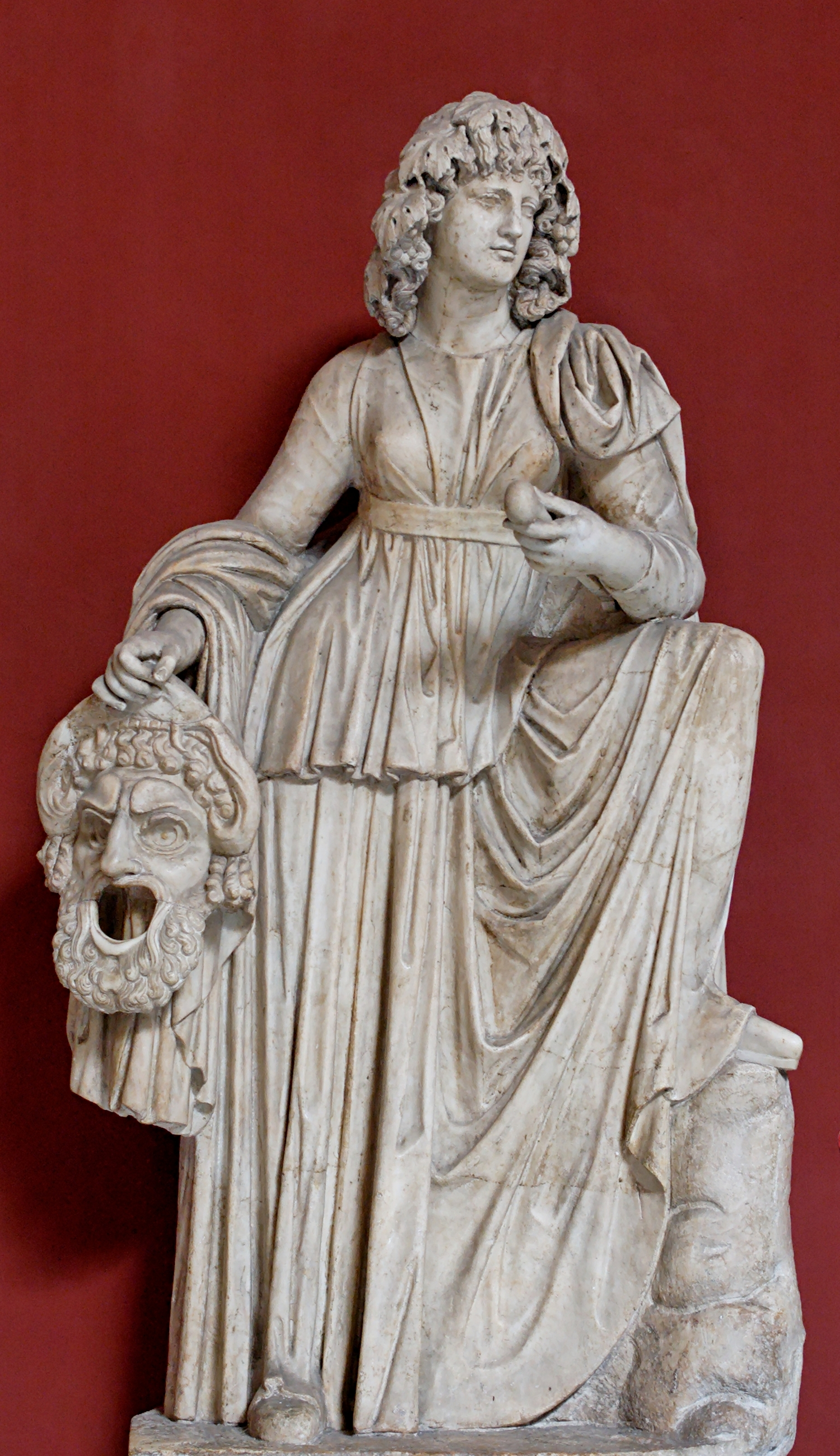
Melpomene with a dagger (astronomical symbol)

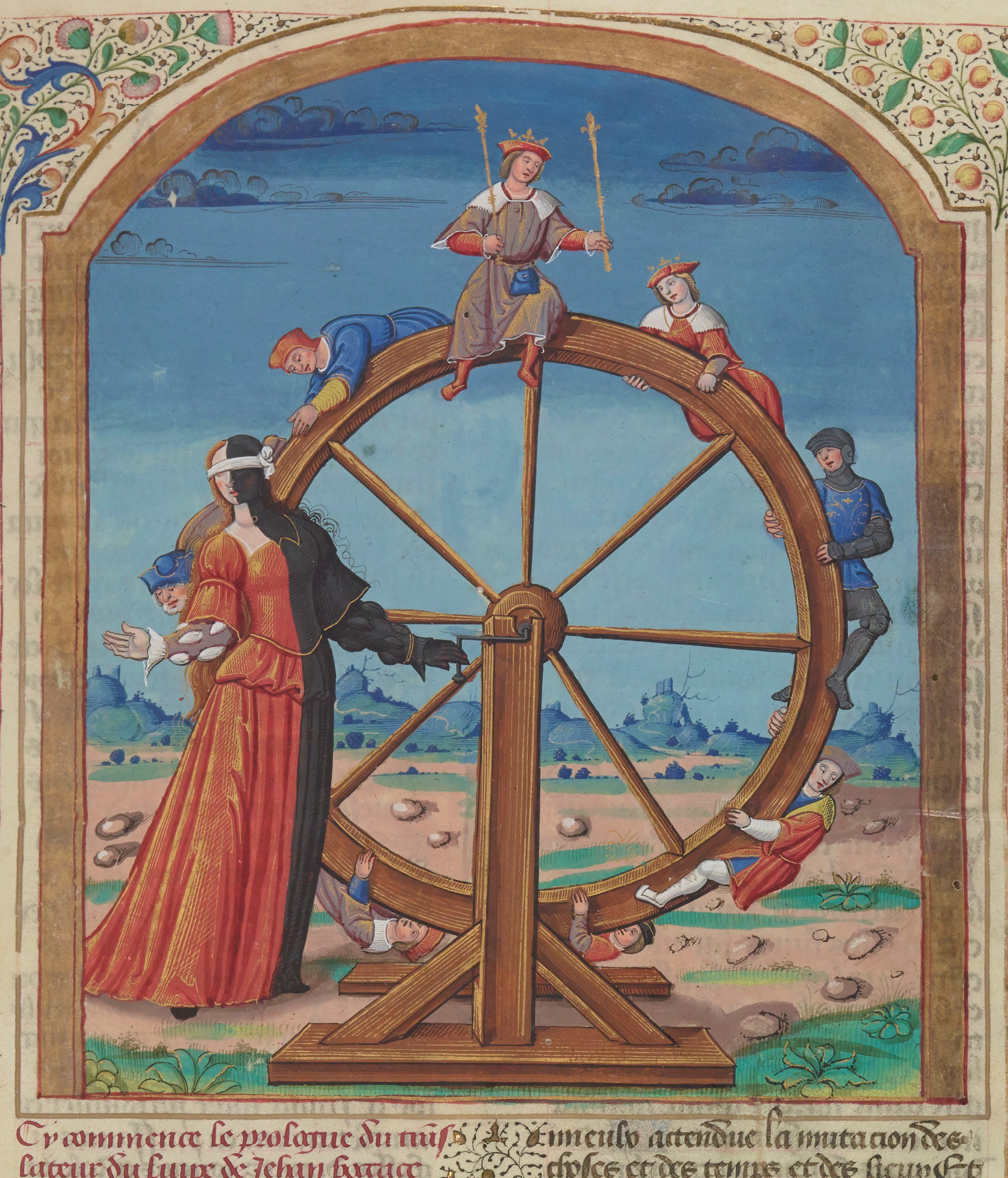
Fortuna with her wheel (astronomical symbol)

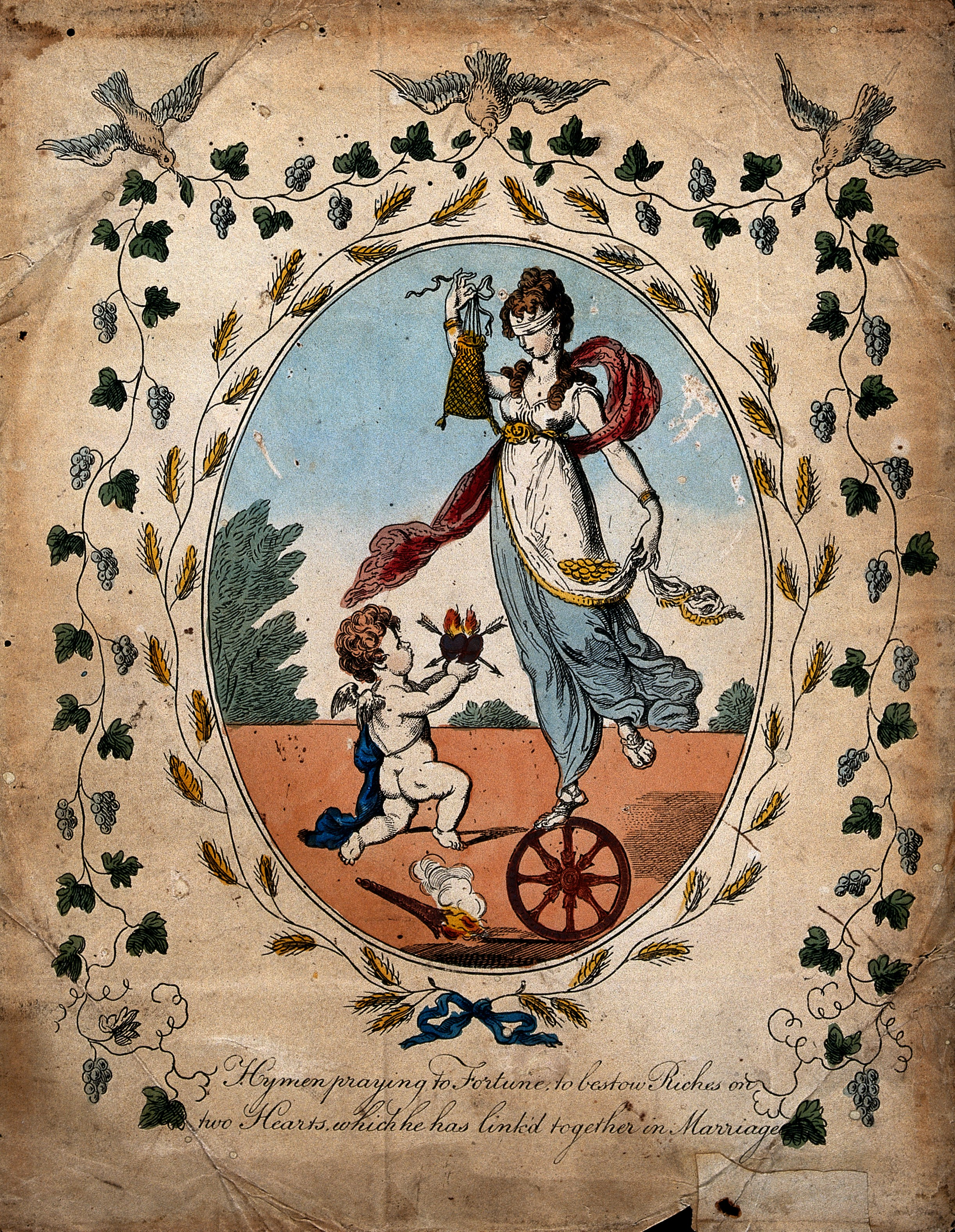
blindfolded Fortuna balanced on a wheel

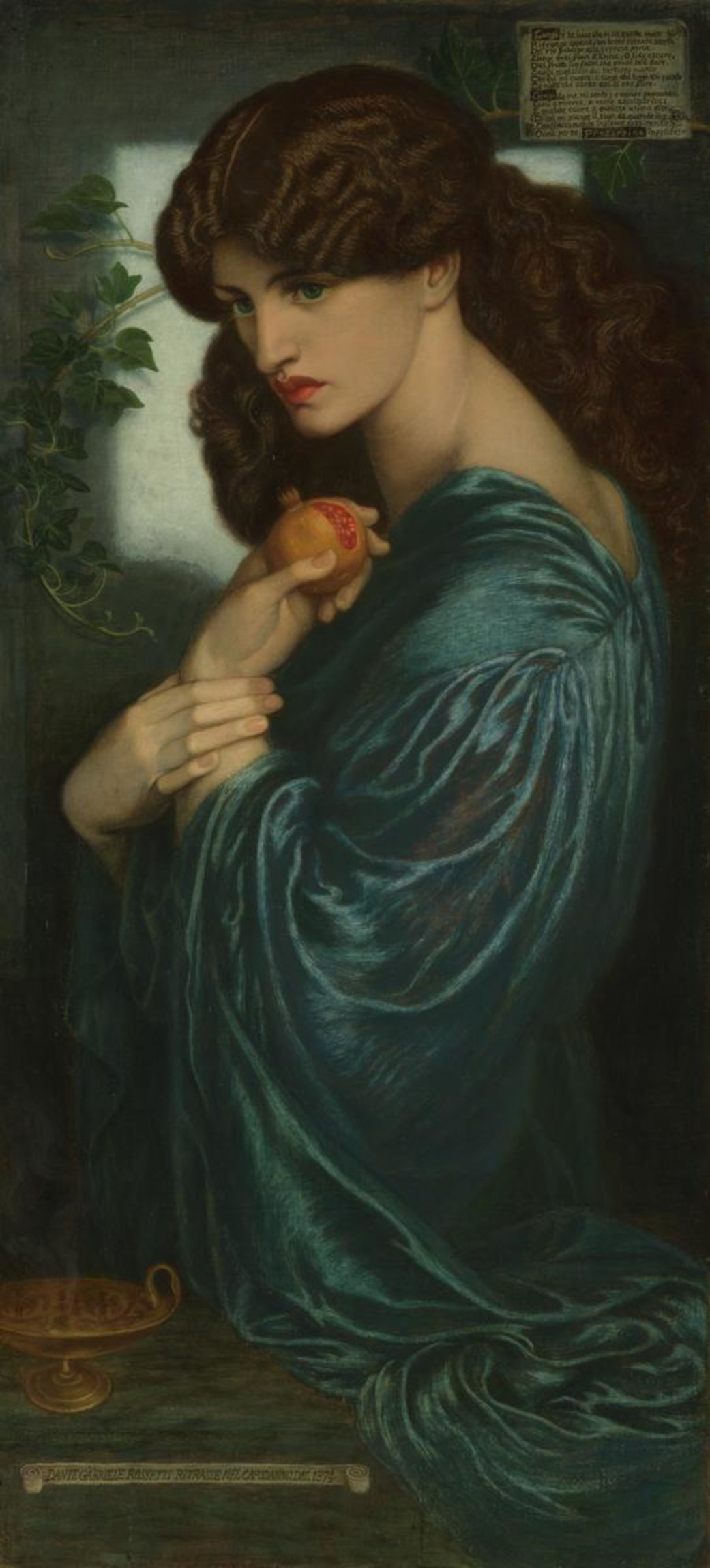
Proserpina with a pomegranate (astronomical symbol)

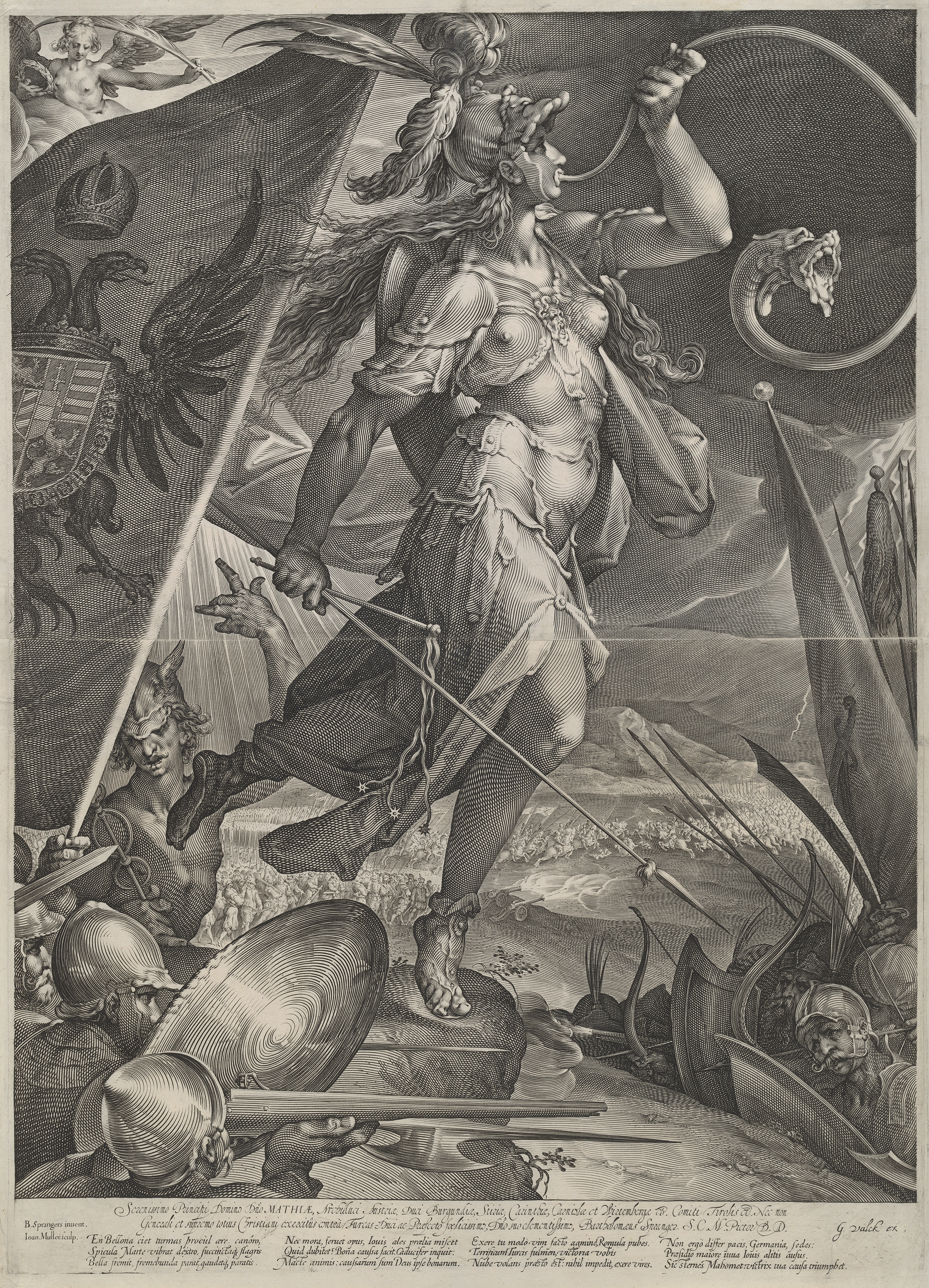
Bellona with a lance and flail (astronomical symbol)

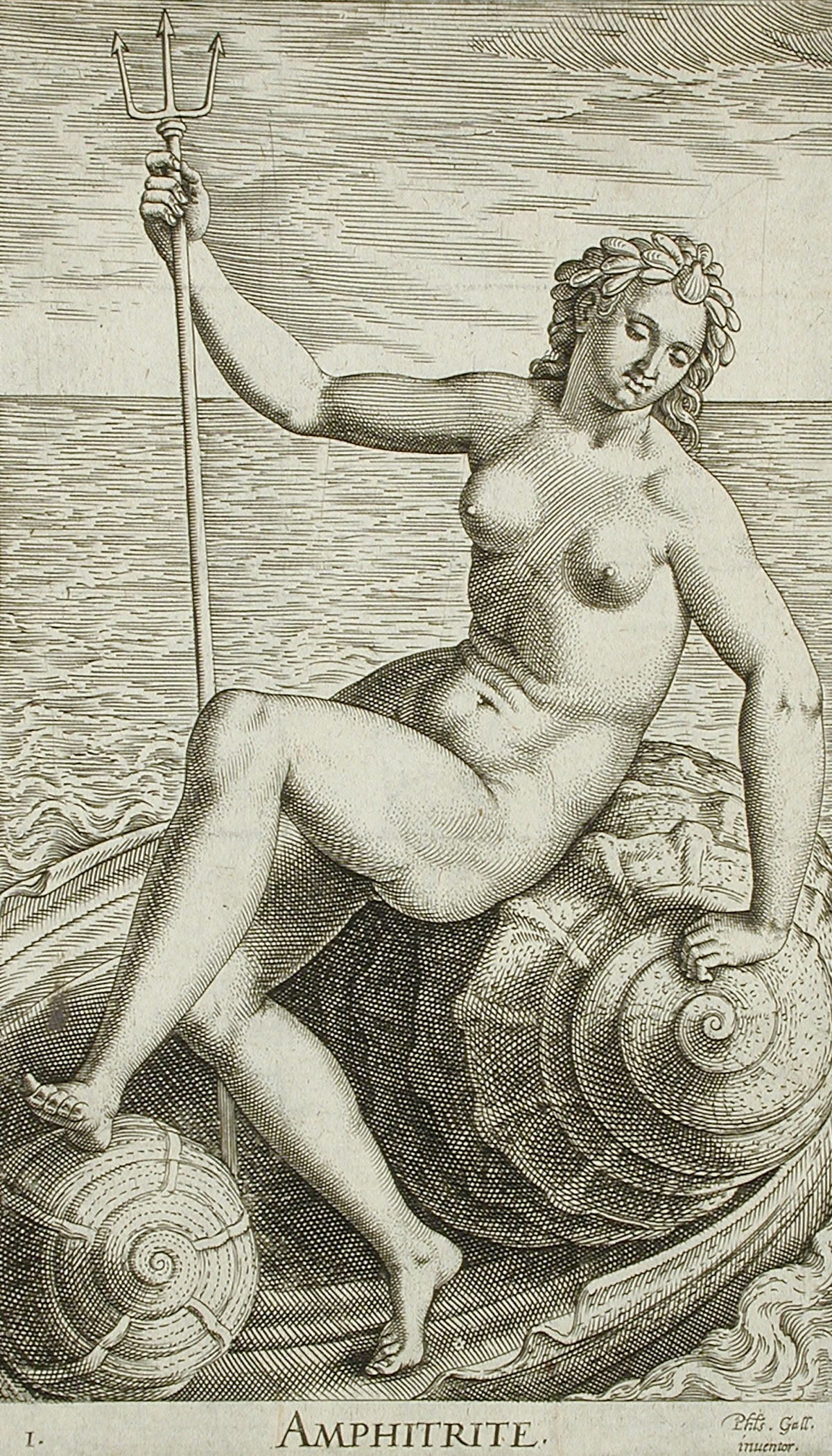
Amphitrite on a shell (astronomical symbol)

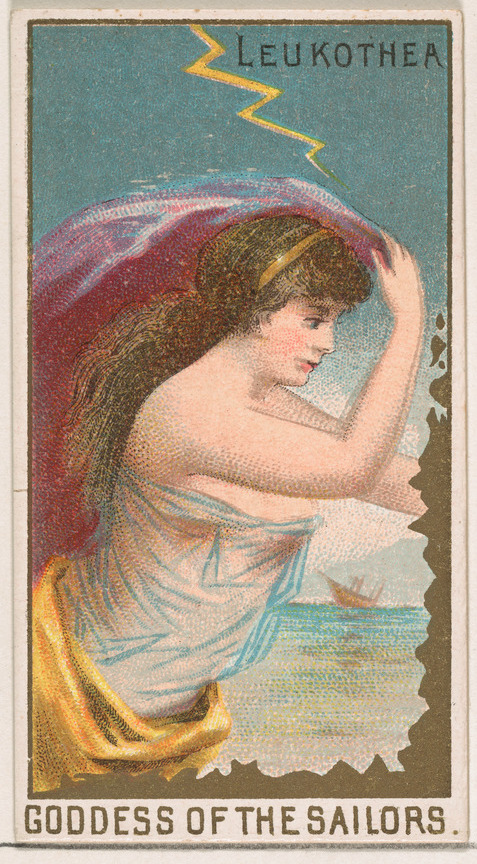
Leukothea (astronomical symbol) as goddess of sailors

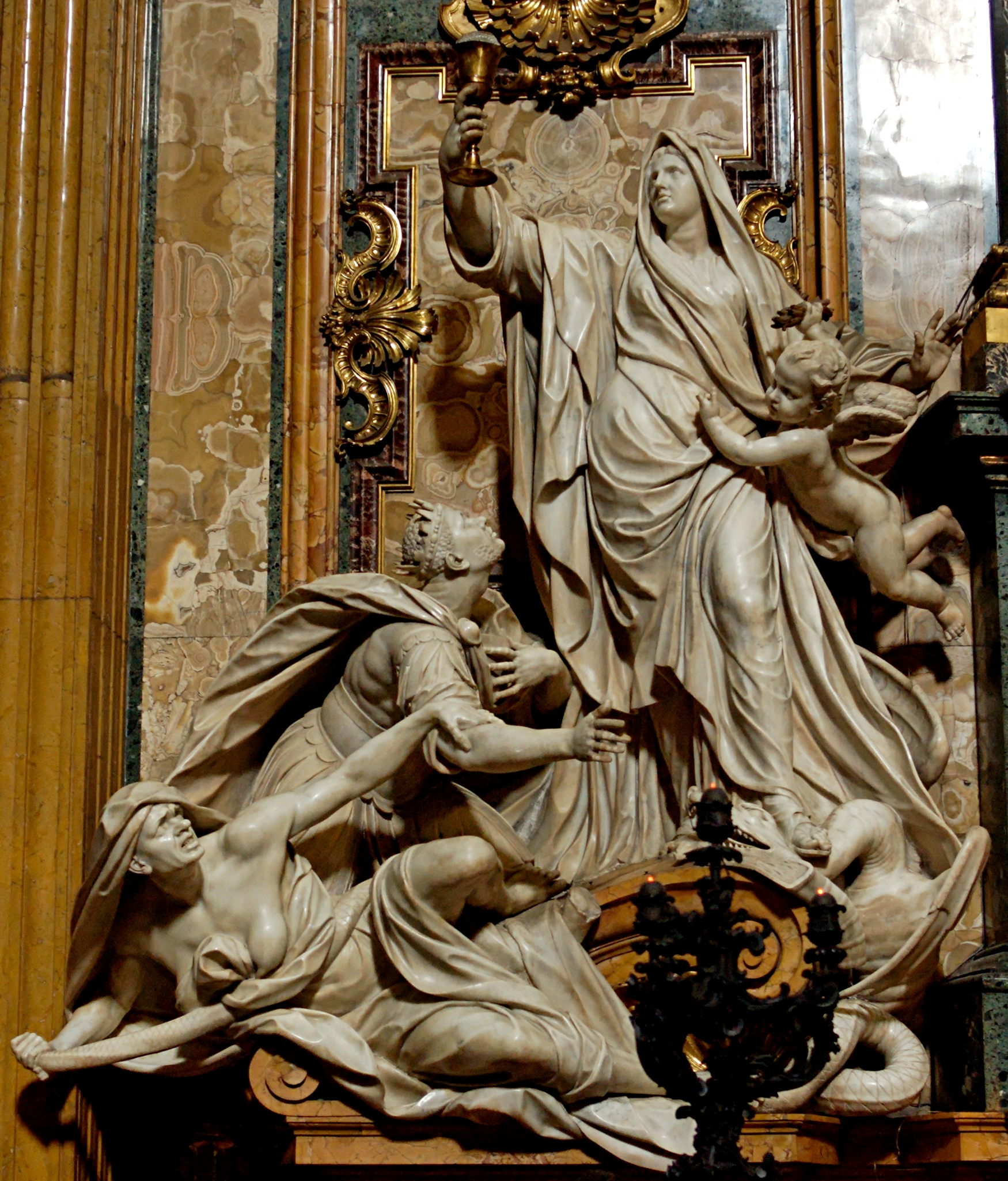
Faith (Fides, astronomical symbol) triumphs over idolatry

== See also ==
- Astrological symbol
- Astronomical symbol
- Gender symbol
- Classical planets in Western alchemy
