= Astronomical symbols =

Symbols in astronomy

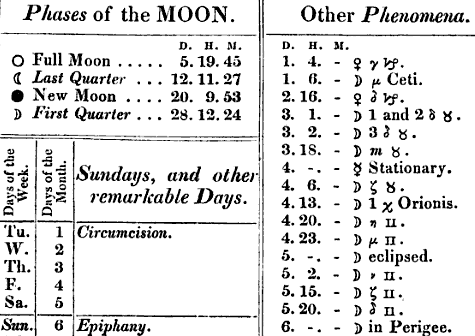
This excerpt from the 1833 Nautical Almanac illustrates the use of (upper left) astronomical symbols for the phases of the moon; and (right) the generic symbol for the moon and symbols for the planets and zodiacal constellations.

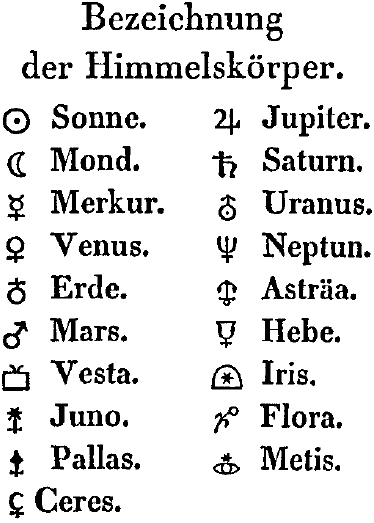
"Designation of celestial bodies" in a German almanac printed in 1850, with the first four asteroids ordered as planets, and the next five appended at the end

Astronomical symbols are abstract pictorial symbols used to represent astronomical objects, theoretical constructs and observational events in European astronomy. The earliest forms of these symbols appear in Greek papyrus texts of late antiquity. The Byzantine codices in which many Greek papyrus texts were preserved continued and extended the inventory of astronomical symbols. New symbols have been invented to represent many planets and minor planets discovered in the 18th to the 21st centuries.

These symbols were once commonly used by professional astronomers, amateur astronomers, alchemists, and astrologers. While they are still commonly used in almanacs and astrological publications, their occurrence in published research and texts on astronomy is relatively infrequent, with some exceptions such as the Sun and Earth symbols appearing in astronomical constants, and certain zodiacal signs used to represent the solstices and equinoxes.

Unicode has encoded many of these symbols, mainly in the Miscellaneous Symbols, Miscellaneous Symbols and Arrows, Miscellaneous Symbols and Pictographs, Alchemical Symbols, and Miscellaneous Symbols Supplement blocks.

== Sun and Moon ==
The use of astronomical symbols for the Sun and Moon dates to antiquity. The forms of the symbols that appear in the original papyrus texts of Greek horoscopes are a circle with one ray for the Sun and a crescent for the Moon. The modern Sun symbol, a circle with a dot (☉), first appeared in Europe in the Renaissance.

The symbol for the Sun in late Classical (4th c.) and medieval Byzantine (11th c.) manuscripts

The symbol for the Moon in a medieval Byzantine manuscript (11th c.). The late Classical appearance was similar.

In modern academic writing, the Sun symbol is used for astronomical constants relating to the Sun. T_{eff☉} represents the solar effective temperature, and the luminosity, mass, and radius of stars are often represented using the corresponding solar constants (L_{☉}, M_{☉}, and R_{☉}, respectively) as units of measurement.

Sun
Referent	Symbol	Unicode code point	Browser display	Represents
Sun	Sol	U+2609 (dec 9737)	☉︎	Standard astronomical symbol
Sun	Sol	U+1F71A (dec 128794)	🜚︎	the Sun with one ray
Sun	Sun with face	U+1F31E (dec 127774)	🌞︎︎	the face of the Sun or "Sun in splendor"

Moon and lunar phases
Referent	Symbol	Unicode code point	Browser text display	Represents
Moon	Crescent moon	U+263D (dec 9789)	☽︎	an increscent (waxing) moon (as viewed from the northern hemisphere)
Moon	Decrescent Moon	U+263E (dec 9790)	☾	a decrescent (waning) moon (as viewed from the northern hemisphere)
new moon	New Moon	U+1F311 (dec 127761)	🌑︎	fully dark
new moon	New Moon with face	U+1F31A (dec 127770)	🌚︎	fully dark
waxing crescent		U+1F312 (dec 127762)	🌒︎	encrescent moon (northern hemisphere)
first-quarter (waxing) moon	First-quarter moon	U+1F313 (dec 127763)	🌓︎	one week into the month, half the visible face illuminated
first-quarter (waxing) moon	or	U+1F31B (dec 127771)	🌛︎︎	one week into the month, half the visible face illuminated
waxing gibbous		U+1F314 (dec 127764)	🌔︎	(northern hemisphere)
full moon	Full Moon	U+1F315 (dec 127765)	🌕︎	fully illuminated
full moon	Full Moon with face	U+1F31D (dec 127773)	🌝︎︎	fully illuminated
waning gibbous		U+1F316 (dec 127766)	🌖︎	(northern hemisphere)
last-quarter (waning) moon	Last-quarter moon	U+1F317 (dec 127767)	🌗︎	final week of the month, the other half of the visible face illuminated
last-quarter (waning) moon	or	U+1F31C (dec 127772)	🌜︎︎	final week of the month, the other half of the visible face illuminated
waning crescent		U+1F318 (dec 127768)	🌘︎	decrescent moon (northern hemisphere)

== Planets ==
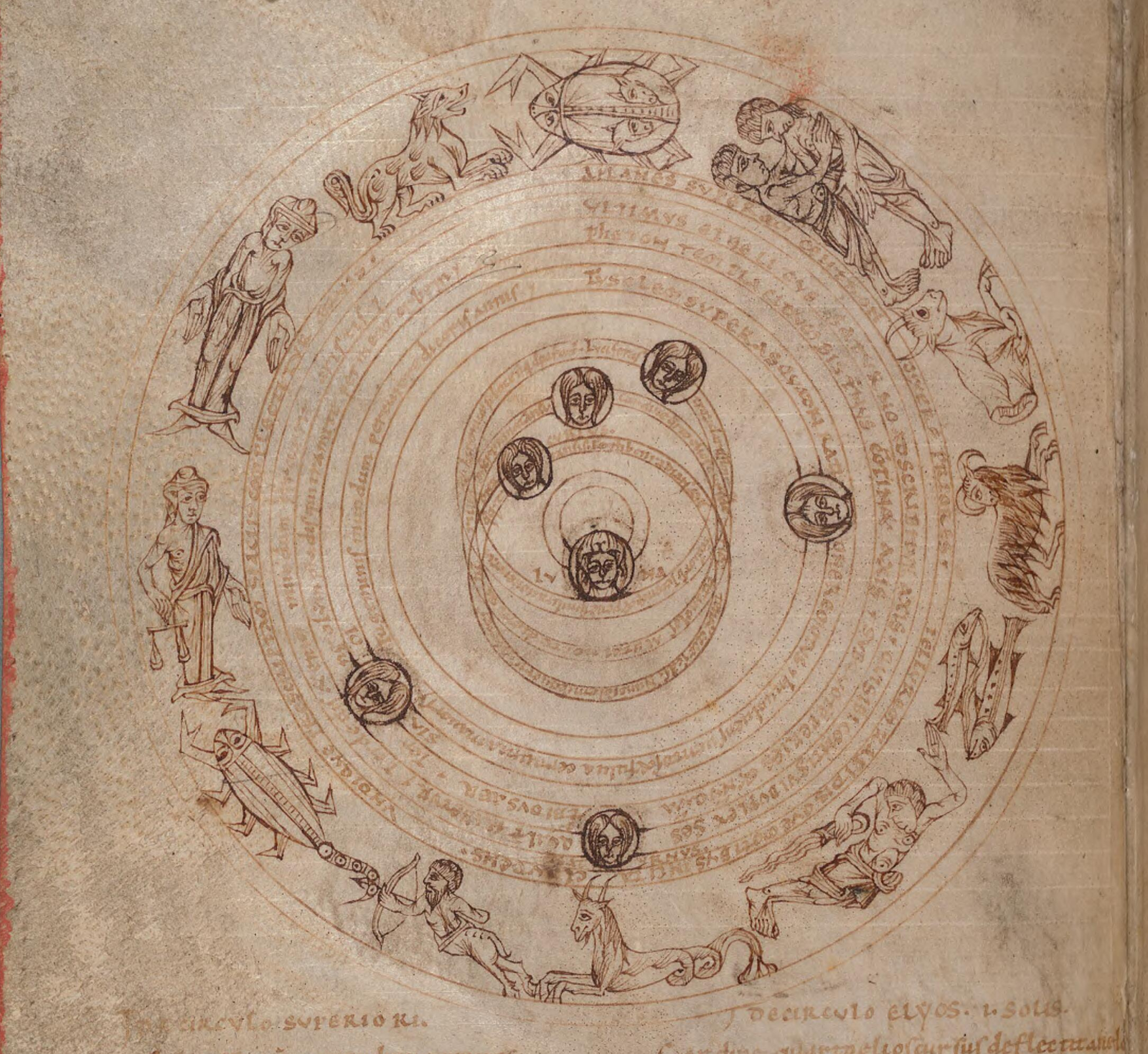
Medieval depiction of the zodiac and the classical planets. The planets are represented by seven faces.

Symbols for the classical planets appear in many medieval Byzantine codices in which many ancient horoscopes were preserved. The written symbols for Mercury, Venus, Jupiter, and Saturn have been traced to forms found in late Greek papyrus texts. The symbols for Jupiter and Saturn are identified as monograms of the corresponding Greek names, and the symbol for Mercury is a stylized caduceus. According to A.S.D. Maunder, antecedents of the planetary symbols were used in art to represent the gods associated with the classical planets; Bianchini's planisphere, discovered by Francesco Bianchini in the 18th century, produced in the 2nd century, shows Greek personifications of planetary gods charged with early versions of the planetary symbols: Mercury has a caduceus; Venus has, attached to her necklace, a cord connected to another necklace; Mars, a spear; Jupiter, a staff; Saturn, a scythe; the Sun, a circlet with rays radiating from it; and the Moon, a headdress with a crescent attached.

A diagram in Byzantine astronomer Johannes Kamateros's 12th century Compendium of Astrology shows the Sun represented by the circle with a ray, Jupiter by the letter Zeta (the initial of Zeus, Jupiter's counterpart in Greek mythology), Mars by a shield crossed by a spear, and the remaining classical planets by symbols resembling the modern ones, without the cross-mark at the bottom of the modern versions of the symbols for Mercury and Venus. These cross-marks first appear around the 16th century. According to Maunder, the addition of crosses appears to be "an attempt to give a savour of Christianity to the symbols of the old pagan gods."

The symbol for Mercury in late Classical (4th c.) and medieval Byzantine (11th c.) manuscripts

The symbol for Venus in late Classical (4th c.) and medieval Byzantine (11th c.) manuscripts

The symbol for Mars in late Classical (6th c.) and medieval Byzantine (11th c.) manuscripts

The symbol for Jupiter in late Classical (4th c.) and medieval Byzantine (11th c.) manuscripts

The symbol for Saturn in late Classical (4th & 5th c.) and medieval Byzantine (11th c.) manuscripts – cf. kappa-rho, ⟨κρ⟩

The symbols for Uranus were created shortly after its discovery. One symbol,, invented by J. G. Köhler and refined by Bode, was intended to represent the newly discovered metal platinum; since platinum, commonly called white gold, was found by chemists mixed with iron, the symbol for platinum combines the alchemical symbols for the planetary elements iron, ♂, and gold, ☉. Another symbol,, was suggested by Joseph Jérôme Lefrançois de Lalande in 1784. In a letter to William Herschel, Lalande described it as "un globe surmonté par la première lettre de votre nom" ("a globe surmounted by the first letter of your name"). Today, Köhler's symbol is more common among astronomers, and Lalande's among astrologers, although it is not uncommon to see each symbol in the other context.

Several symbols were proposed for Neptune to accompany the suggested names for the planet. Claiming the right to name his discovery, Urbain Le Verrier originally proposed the name Neptune and the symbol of a trident, while falsely stating that this had been officially approved by the French Bureau des Longitudes. In October, he sought to name the planet Leverrier, after himself, and he had loyal support in this from the observatory director, François Arago, who in turn proposed a new symbol for the planet. However, this suggestion met with stiff resistance outside France. French almanacs quickly reintroduced the name Herschel for Uranus, after that planet's discoverer Sir William Herschel, and Leverrier for the new planet. Professor James Pillans of the University of Edinburgh defended the name Janus for the new planet, and proposed a key for its symbol. Meanwhile, German-Russian astronomer Friedrich Georg Wilhelm von Struve presented the name Neptune on December 29, 1846, to the Saint Petersburg Academy of Sciences. In August 1847, the Bureau des Longitudes announced its decision to follow prevailing astronomical practice and adopt the choice of Neptune, with Arago refraining from participating in this decision.

The International Astronomical Union discourages the use of these symbols in journal articles, though they do occur. In certain cases where planetary symbols might be used, such as in the headings of tables, the IAU Style Manual permits certain one- and (to disambiguate Mercury and Mars) two-letter abbreviations for the names of the planets.

Planets
Planet	IAU abbreviation	Symbol	Unicode code point	Browser display	Represents
Mercury	H, Me	Mercury	U+263F (dec 9791)	☿	Mercury's caduceus, with a cross
Venus	V	Venus	U+2640 (dec 9792)	♀	Perhaps Venus's necklace or a (copper) hand mirror, with a cross
Earth	E	Earth	U+1F728 (dec 128808)	🜨	the four quadrants of the world, divided by the four rivers descending from Eden (Note: This symbol has been reinterpretated as the four continents (north: Europe, east: Asia, south: Africa, west: America), and in such cases may be modified to. A less common variant is, now obsolete.)
Earth	E	Earth	U+2641 (dec 9793)	♁	a globus cruciger
Mars	M, Ma	Mars	U+2642 (dec 9794)	♂	Mars's shield and spear
Jupiter	J	Jupiter	U+2643 (dec 9795)	♃	the letter Zeta with an abbreviation stroke (for Zeus, the Greek equivalent to the Roman god Jupiter)
Saturn	S	Saturn	U+2644 (dec 9796)	♄	the letters kappa-rho with an abbreviation stroke (for Kronos, the Greek equivalent to the Roman god Saturn), with a cross
Uranus	U	Uranus	U+26E2 (dec 9954)	⛢	symbol of the recently described element platinum, which was invented to provide a symbol for Uranus
Uranus	U	Uranus	U+2645 (dec 9797)	♅	a globe surmounted by the letter H (for Herschel, who discovered Uranus) (more common in older or British literature)
Neptune	N	Neptune	U+2646 (dec 9798)	♆	Neptune's trident
Neptune	N	Neptune (alternate symbol)	U+2BC9 (dec 11209)	⯉	a globe surmounted by the letters "L" and "V", (for Le Verrier, who discovered Neptune) (more common in older, especially French, literature)

== Asteroids ==
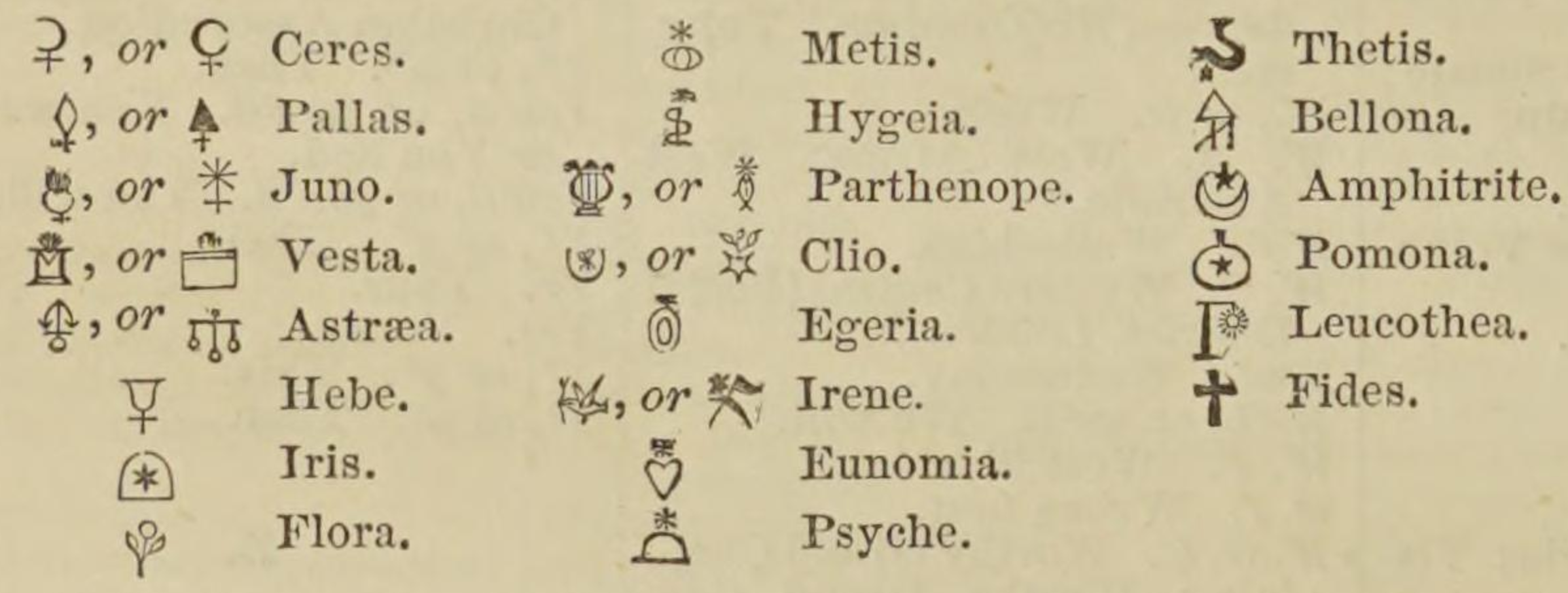
Asteroid symbols as listed in Webster's Dictionary in 1864. All but the first 4 were already obsolete by this time. ("Pomona" is a mistake for "Proserpina".)

Following the discovery of Ceres in 1801 by the astronomer and Catholic priest Giuseppe Piazzi, a group of astronomers ratified the name, which Piazzi had proposed. At that time, the sickle was chosen as a symbol of the planet.

The symbol for 2 Pallas, the spear of Pallas Athena, was invented by Baron Franz Xaver von Zach, who organized a group of twenty-four astronomers to search for a planet between the orbits of Mars and Jupiter. The symbol was introduced by von Zach in 1802. In a letter to von Zach, discoverer Heinrich Wilhelm Matthäus Olbers (who had discovered and named Pallas) expressed his approval of the proposed symbol, but wished that the handle of the sickle of Ceres had been adorned with a pommel instead of a crossbar, to better differentiate it from the sign of Venus.

Symbols for Ceres and Pallas, as rendered in 1802

Symbol for Juno, as rendered in 1804 with the available type sorts of an asterisk * and a rotated dagger †

Symbol for Vesta, as rendered in 1807

German astronomer Karl Ludwig Harding created the symbol for 3 Juno. Harding, who discovered this asteroid in 1804, proposed the name Juno and the use of a scepter topped with a star as its astronomical symbol.

The symbol for 4 Vesta was invented by German mathematician Carl Friedrich Gauss. Olbers, having previously discovered and named 2 Pallas, gave Gauss the honor of naming his newest discovery. Gauss decided to name the new asteroid for the goddess Vesta, and also designed the symbol: the altar of the goddess, with the sacred fire burning on it. Other contemporaneous writers use a more elaborate symbol instead.

Karl Ludwig Hencke, a German amateur astronomer, discovered the next two asteroids, 5 Astraea (in 1845) and 6 Hebe (in 1847). Hencke requested that the symbol for 5 Astraea be an upside-down anchor; however, a weighing scale was sometimes used instead. Gauss named 6 Hebe at Hencke's request, and chose a wineglass as the symbol.

As more new asteroids were discovered, astronomers continued to assign symbols to them. Thus, 7 Iris (discovered 1847) had for its symbol a rainbow with a star; 8 Flora (discovered 1847), a flower; 9 Metis (discovered 1848), an eye with a star; 10 Hygiea (discovered 1849), an upright snake with a star on its head; 11 Parthenope (discovered 1850), a standing fish with a star; 12 Victoria (discovered 1850), a star topped with a branch of laurel; 13 Egeria (discovered 1850), a buckler; 14 Irene (discovered 1851), a dove carrying an olive branch with a star on its head; 15 Eunomia (discovered 1851), a heart topped with a star; 16 Psyche (discovered 1852), a butterfly wing with a star; 17 Thetis (discovered 1852), a dolphin with a star; 18 Melpomene (discovered 1852), a dagger over a star; and 19 Fortuna (discovered 1852), a star over Fortuna's wheel. (Note: John Brocklesby's Elements of Astronomy (1855 edition) contains unusual symbols for 19 Fortuna (similar to Astraea's inverted anchor) and 20 Massalia (an anchor) not attested anywhere else on p. 14, but they do not appear in the detailed asteroid profiles on p. 235 and were removed from the 1857 edition, suggesting that they were mistakes.)

In most cases the discovery reports only describe the symbols and do not draw them; from Hygiea onward, there are significant glyph variants as well as a significant delay between the discovery and the symbols having been communicated to the astronomical community as a whole. Consequently, astronomical publications were not always complete. The discovery reports for Melpomene and Fortuna do not even describe the symbols, which only appear in a later reference work by the discoverer; the symbols are drawn in the reports for Astraea, Hebe, and Thetis. Benjamin Apthorp Gould criticised the symbols in 1852 as being often inefficient at suggesting the bodies they represented and difficult to draw, and pointed out that the symbol that had been described for Irene had to his knowledge never actually been drawn. The same year, John Russell Hind expressed the contrary view that the symbols were easier to remember than the numbers, but also admitted that the names were more commonly used than either the numbers or the symbols.

The last edition of the Berliner Astronomisches Jahrbuch (BAJ, Berlin Astronomical Yearbook) to use asteroid symbols was for the year 1853, published in 1850: although it includes eleven asteroids up to Parthenope, it only includes symbols for the first nine (up to Metis), noting that the symbols for Hygiea and Parthenope had not yet been made definitively known. The last edition of the British The Nautical Almanac and Astronomical Ephemeris to include asteroid ephemerides was that for 1855, published in 1852: despite fifteen asteroids being known (up to Eunomia), symbols are only included for the first nine.

Johann Franz Encke made a major change in the BAJ for the year 1854, published in 1851. He introduced encircled numbers instead of symbols, although his numbering began with Astraea, the first four asteroids continuing to be denoted by their traditional symbols. This symbolic innovation was adopted very quickly by the astronomical community. The following year (1852), Astraea's number was bumped up to 5, but Ceres through Vesta were not listed by their numbers until the 1867 edition. The Astronomical Journal edited by Gould adopted the symbolism in this form, with Ceres at 1 and Astraea at 5. This form had previously been proposed in an 1850 letter by Heinrich Christian Schumacher to Gauss. The circle later became a pair of parentheses, which were easier to typeset, and the parentheses were sometimes omitted altogether over the next few decades. Thus the iconic asteroid symbols fell out of use; reference works continued giving them for the next few decades, though they often noted them as being obsolete.

A few asteroids were given symbols by their discoverers after the encircled-number notation became widespread. 26 Proserpina (discovered 1853), 28 Bellona (discovered 1854), 35 Leukothea (discovered 1855), and 37 Fides (discovered 1855), all discovered by German astronomer Robert Luther, were assigned, respectively, a pomegranate with a star inside; a whip and spear; an antique lighthouse; and a cross. These symbols were drawn in the discovery reports. 29 Amphitrite was named and assigned a shell for its symbol by George Bishop, the owner of the observatory where astronomer Albert Marth discovered it in 1854, though the symbol was not drawn in the discovery report.

Insignia of the NASA Psyche mission

All these symbols are rare or obsolete in modern astronomy, though NASA has used Ceres' symbol when describing the dwarf planets, and Psyche's symbol may have influenced the design of the insignia for the Psyche mission. The major use of symbols for minor planets today is by astrologers, who have invented symbols for many more objects, though they sometimes use symbols that differ from the historical symbols for the same bodies.

The symbol for 99942 Apophis, a near-Earth asteroid discovered in 2004 that attracted interest when initial observations suggested a significant probability of an Earth impact in 2029 (a possibility since eliminated), is much later. It was designed by Denis Moskowitz, who also designed many of the dwarf-planet symbols, at a time when asteroid symbols had become extremely rare in astronomy. Nonetheless, its inclusion of a star is meant to recall the 19th-century asteroid symbols.

=== Asteroid table ===
Asteroids
Asteroid	Symbol	Unicode code point	Browser display	Represents
1 Ceres	1 Ceres	U+26B3 (dec 9907)	⚳	A scythe. In some fonts, the symbol for Saturn is the inverse.
2 Pallas	2 Pallas	U+26B4 (dec 9908)	⚴	A spear. In modern renditions, the spearhead has a broader or narrower diamond shape. In 1802, it was given a cordate leaf shape. A variation has a triangular head, conflating it with the alchemical symbol for sulfur.
2 Pallas	2 Pallas	U+26B4 (dec 9908)	⚴	A spear. In modern renditions, the spearhead has a broader or narrower diamond shape. In 1802, it was given a cordate leaf shape. A variation has a triangular head, conflating it with the alchemical symbol for sulfur.
3 Juno	3 Juno	U+26B5 (dec 9909)	⚵	a scepter topped with a star
3 Juno	3 Juno	U+26B5 (dec 9909)	⚵	a scepter topped with a star
4 Vesta	4 Vesta	U+1F777 (dec 128887)	🝷	The temple hearth with the sacred fire of Vesta. The original form was a box with what looks like the horns of Aries on top.
4 Vesta	4 Vesta	U+1F777 (dec 128887)	🝷	An early elaborate form is an altar surmounted with a censer holding the sacred fire.
4 Vesta	4 Vesta	U+26B6 (dec 9910)	⚶	The modern V-shaped form dates from astrological use in the 1970s; it is an abbreviation of the above.
5 Astraea	5 Astraea	U+1F778 (dec 128888)	🝸	an inverted anchor
5 Astraea	5 Astraea (alternate symbol)	U+2696 (dec 9878)	⚖	a weighing scale
6 Hebe	6 Hebe	U+1CEC0 (dec 118464)	𜻀	A wineglass. Originally typeset as a triangle ∇ set on a base ⊥.
6 Hebe	6 Hebe	U+1CEC0 (dec 118464)	𜻀	A wineglass. Originally typeset as a triangle ∇ set on a base ⊥.
7 Iris	7 Iris	U+1CEC1 (dec 118465)	𜻁	a rainbow with a star inside it
7 Iris	7 Iris	U+1CEC1 (dec 118465)	𜻁	a rainbow with a star inside it
8 Flora		U+1CEC2 (dec 118466)	𜻂	a flower
9 Metis	9 Metis	U+1CEC3 (dec 118467)	𜻃	an eye with a star above it
10 Hygiea	10 Hygiea	U+1F779 (dec 128889)	🝹	a serpent with a star (from the Bowl of Hygiea U+1F54F)
10 Hygiea	10 Hygiea	U+2695 (dec 9877)	⚕	a Rod of Asclepius. Cf. the modern astrological symbol U+2BDA, a caduceus (often confused with the Rod of Asclepius)
11 Parthenope	11 Parthenope	U+1CEC4 (dec 118468)	𜻄	a fish with a star. This is the original symbol from the brief period when this asteroid was known and astronomers were still using iconic symbols.
11 Parthenope	11 Parthenope	U+1F77A (dec 128890)	🝺	a lyre. This symbol only appears in later 19th-century reference works that appeared when iconic symbols for asteroids had already become obsolete.
12 Victoria	12 Victoria	U+1CEC5 (dec 118469)	𜻅	a star with a branch of laurel
12 Victoria	12 Victoria	U+1CEC5 (dec 118469)	𜻅	a star with a branch of laurel
13 Egeria		U+1CEC6 (dec 118470)	𜻆	a buckler
13 Egeria	13 Egeria	U+1CEC6 (dec 118470)	𜻆	a buckler
14 Irene	14 Irene	U+1CEC7 (dec 118471)	𜻇	a dove carrying an olive-branch in its mouth and a star on its head
15 Eunomia	15 Eunomia	U+1CEC8 (dec 118472)	𜻈	a heart with a star on top
16 Psyche	16 Psyche	U+1CEC9 (dec 118473)	𜻉	a butterfly's wing and a star
17 Thetis		U+1CECA (dec 118474)	𜻊	a dolphin and a star
18 Melpomene	18 Melpomene	U+1CECB (dec 118475)	𜻋	a dagger over a star
19 Fortuna	19 Fortuna	U+1CECC (dec 118476)	𜻌	a star over a wheel
26 Proserpina	26 Proserpina	U+1CECD (dec 118477)	𜻍	a pomegranate with a star inside it
28 Bellona	28 Bellona	U+1CECE (dec 118478)	𜻎	Bellona's whip / morning star and spear
28 Bellona	28 Bellona	U+1CECE (dec 118478)	𜻎	Bellona's whip / morning star and spear
29 Amphitrite	29 Amphitrite	U+1CECF (dec 118479)	𜻏	a "shell". There is no mention of a star in the original description, but the only 19th-century drawing of the symbol includes one.
35 Leukothea	35 Leukothea	U+1CED0 (dec 118480)	𜻐	a pharos (ancient lighthouse)
37 Fides	37 Fides	(Many possibilities)		a Latin cross
99942 Apophis	99942 Apophis	—N/a	—N/a	a stylised depiction of the Egyptian god Apep, with a star

== Trans-Neptunian objects ==
Pluto's name and symbol were announced by the discoverers on May 1, 1930. The symbol, a monogram of the letters PL, could be interpreted to stand for Pluto or for Percival Lowell, the astronomer who initiated Lowell Observatory's search for a planet beyond the orbit of Neptune. Pluto has an alternative symbol consisting of an orb over Pluto's bident: it is more common in astrology than astronomy, and was popularised by the astrologer Paul Clancy, but has been used by NASA to refer to Pluto as a dwarf planet. There are a few other astrological symbols for Pluto that are used locally. Pluto also had the IAU abbreviation P when it was considered the ninth planet.

The other large trans-Neptunian objects were only discovered around the dawn of the 21st century. They were not generally thought to be planets on their discovery, and planetary symbols had in any case mostly fallen out of use among astronomers by then. Denis Moskowitz, a software engineer in Massachusetts, proposed astronomical symbols for the dwarf planets Quaoar, Sedna, Orcus, Haumea, Eris, Makemake, and Gonggong. These symbols are somewhat standard among astrologers (e.g. in the program Astrolog), which is where planetary symbols are most used today. Moskowitz has also proposed symbols for Varuna, Ixion, and Salacia, and others have done so for additional TNOs, but there is little consistency between sources.

NASA has used Moskowitz's symbols for Haumea, Makemake, and Eris in an astronomical context, and Unicode labels the symbols for Haumea, Makemake, Gonggong, Quaoar, and Orcus (added to Unicode in 2022) as "astronomy symbols".

Trans-Neptunian objects
Object	Symbol	Unicode code point	Browser display	Represents
50000 Quaoar	Quaoar	U+1F77E (dec 128894)	🝾	a Q for Quaoar with the tail fashioned as a canoe, stylised to resemble the angular rock art of the Tongva
90377 Sedna	Sedna	U+2BF2 (dec 11250)	⯲	a monogram of the Inuktitut syllabics ᓴ sa and ᓐ n, as Sedna's Inuit name is ᓴᓐᓇ Sanna
90482 Orcus	Orcus	U+1F77F (dec 128895)	🝿	an O-R monogram for Orcus, stylised to resemble a skull and an orca's grin
134340 Pluto	Pluto	U+2647 (dec 9799)	♇	a P-L monogram for Pluto and Percival Lowell
134340 Pluto	Pluto	U+2BD3 (dec 11219)	⯓	a cap or planetary orb over Pluto's bident
136108 Haumea	Haumea	U+1F77B (dec 128891)	🝻	conflation of Hawaiian petroglyphs for woman and birth, as Haumea was the goddess of both
136199 Eris	Eris	U+2BF0 (dec 11248)	⯰	the Hand of Eris, a traditional symbol from Discordianism (a religion worshipping the goddess Eris)
136472 Makemake	Makemake	U+1F77C (dec 128892)	🝼	engraved face of the Rapa Nui god Makemake, also resembling an M
225088 Gonggong	Gonggong	U+1F77D (dec 128893)	🝽	Chinese character 共 gòng (the first character in Gonggong's name), combined with a snake's tail

== Zodiac and other constellations ==
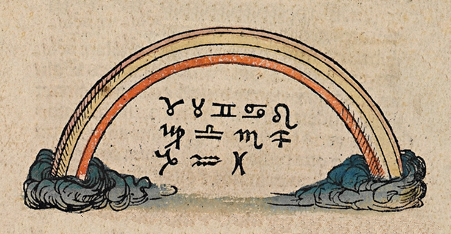
A late-15th-century manuscript with the zodiac symbols

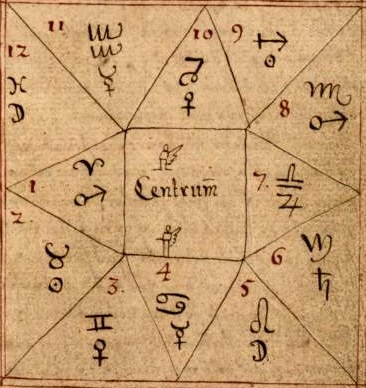
A mid-18th-century manuscript with symbols for the zodiac and planets. Note the distinctive shapes of Virgo (6), Scorpius (8), Capricornus (10) and Aquarius (11).

The zodiac symbols have several astronomical interpretations. Depending on context, a zodiac symbol may denote either a constellation, or a point or interval on the ecliptic plane.

Lists of astronomical phenomena published by almanacs sometimes included conjunctions of stars and planets or the Moon; rather than print the full name of the star, a Greek letter and the symbol for the constellation of the star was sometimes used instead. The ecliptic was sometimes divided into 12 signs, each subdivided into 30 degrees, and the sign component of ecliptic longitude was expressed either with a number from 0 to 11. or with the corresponding zodiacal symbol.

In modern astronomical writing, all the constellations, including the 12 of the zodiac, have dedicated three-letter abbreviations, which specifically refer to constellations rather than signs. The zodiac symbols are also sometimes used to represent points on the ecliptic, particularly the solstices and equinoxes. Each symbol is taken to represent the "first point" of each sign, rather than the place in the visible constellation where the alignment is observed. Thus, ♈︎ the symbol for Aries, represents the March equinox; (Note: The March equinox defines the astrological sign of Aries, and is also used as the point of origin for most modern celestial coordinate systems. But at present, the equinox actually occurs in the western part of the astronomical constellation Pisces, near its southern border, and is slowly transitioning into the constellation Aquarius.) ♋︎, for Cancer, the June solstice; (Note: The June solstice is aligned with the sign of Cancer, but occurs very nearly on the modern border between Gemini and Taurus.) ♎︎, for Libra, the September equinox; (Note: The September equinox is aligned with the sign of Libra, but occurs in western Virgo.) and ♑︎, for Capricorn, the December solstice. (Note: The December solstice is aligned with the sign Capricorn, but occurs very nearly on top of the modern border between Sagittarius and Ophiuchus.)

Although the use of astrological sign symbols is rare, the particular symbol ♈︎ for Aries, is an exception; it is commonly used in modern astronomy to represent the location of the (slowly) moving reference point for the ecliptic and equatorial celestial coordinate systems.

Zodiacal symbols
Constellation	IAU abbreviation	Number	Astrological location	Symbol	Translation	Unicode code point	Browser display
Aries	Ari	0	0°	Aries	ram	U+2648 (dec 9800)	♈︎
Taurus	Tau	1	30°	Taurus	bull	U+2649 (dec 9801)	♉︎
Gemini	Gem	2	60°	Gemini	twinned	U+264A (dec 9802)	♊︎
Cancer	Cnc	3	90°	Cancer	crab	U+264B (dec 9803)	♋︎
Leo	Leo	4	120°	Leo	lion	U+264C (dec 9804)	♌︎
Virgo	Vir	5	150°	Virgo	maiden	U+264D (dec 9805)	♍︎
Libra	Lib	6	180°	Libra	scales	U+264E (dec 9806)	♎︎
Scorpio	Sco	7	210°	Scorpius	scorpion	U+264F (dec 9807)	♏︎
Sagittarius	Sgr	8	240°	Sagittarius	archer	U+2650 (dec 9808)	♐︎
Capricorn	Cap	9	270°	Capricornus	having a goat's horns	U+2651 (dec 9809)	♑︎
Aquarius	Aqr	10	300°	Aquarius	water-carrier	U+2652 (dec 9810)	♒︎
Pisces	Psc	11	330°	Pisces	fishes	U+2653 (dec 9811)	♓︎

Ophiuchus has been proposed as a thirteenth sign of the zodiac by astrologer Walter Berg in 1995, who gave it a symbol that has become popular in Japan.

Constellation	IAU abbreviation	Symbol	Translation	Unicode code point	Browser display
Ophiuchus	Oph	Ophiuchus	the Serpent-holder	U+26CE (dec 9934)	⛎︎

None of the constellations have official symbols. However, in addition to the zodiac, occasional symbols for other modern constellations, as well as older constellations that occur in modern nomenclature, have appeared in publication. The symbols below were devised by Denis Moskowitz (except those for the 13 constellations already listed above).

Andromeda
Antlia
Apus
Aquarius
Aquila
Ara
Argo Navis

Carina
Puppis
Vela

Aries
Auriga
Boötes
Caelum
Camelopardalis
Cancer
Canes Venatici
Canis Major
Canis Minor
Capricornus
Cassiopeia
Centaurus
Cepheus
Cetus
Chamaeleon
Circinus
Columba
Coma Berenices
Corona Australis
Corona Borealis
Corvus
Crater
Crux
Cygnus
Delphinus
Dorado
Draco
Equuleus
Eridanus
Fornax
Gemini
Grus
Hercules
Horologium
Hydra
Hydrus
Indus
Lacerta
Leo
Leo Minor
Lepus
Libra
Lupus
Lynx
Lyra
Mensa
Microscopium
Monoceros
Musca
Norma
Octans
Ophiuchus
Orion
Pavo
Pegasus
Perseus
Phoenix
Pictor
Pisces
Piscis Austrinus
Pyxis
Quadrans Muralis
Reticulum
Sagitta
Sagittarius
Scorpius
Sculptor
Scutum
Serpens

Serpens Cauda
Serpens Caput

Sextans
Taurus
Telescopium
Triangulum
Triangulum Australe
Tucana
Ursa Major
Ursa Minor
Virgo
Volans
Vulpecula

== Other ==
Symbols for aspects and nodes appear in medieval texts, although medieval and modern usage of the node symbols differ; the modern ascending node symbol (☊) formerly stood for the descending node, and the modern descending node symbol (☋) was used for the ascending node. In describing the Keplerian elements of an orbit, ☊ is sometimes used to denote the ecliptic longitude of the ascending node, although it is more common to use Ω (capital omega, and inverted ℧), which were originally typographical substitutes for the astronomical symbols.

The symbols for aspects first appear in Byzantine codices. Of the symbols for the five Ptolemaic aspects, only the three displayed here — for conjunction, opposition, and quadrature — are used in astronomy.

Symbols for a comet (☄) and a fixed star have been used in published astronomical observations of comets. In tables of these observations, ☄ stood for the comet being discussed and for the star of comparison relative to which measurements of the comet's position were made.

Other symbols
Referent	Symbol	Unicode code point	Browser display
ascending node	ascending node	U+260A (dec 9738)	☊
descending node	descending node	U+260B (dec 9739)	☋
conjunction	conjunction	U+260C (dec 9740)	☌
opposition	opposition	U+260D (dec 9741)	☍
occultation	occultation	U+1F775 (dec 128885)	🝵
a lunar eclipse, or any body in the shadow of another	lunar eclipse	U+1F776 (dec 128886)	🝶
quadrature	quadrature	U+25A1, U+25FB (dec 9633, 9723)	□ , ◻
comet	comet	U+2604 (dec 9732)	☄
fixed star	(Note: The variants of this symbol are quite various.)	(Many possibilities)	
planetary rings (rare)	planetary rings	U+1FA90+FE0E (dec 129680)	🪐︎

Meteor showers also have limited use of astronomical symbols in the literature, designed by Denis Moskowitz. They are based on the parent constellation symbols, with letters included to disambiguate the Aquariids and Taurids.

Delta Aquariids
Eta Aquariids
Geminids
Leonids
Lyrids
Orionids
Perseids
Quadrantids
Taurids
Ursids

For planetary transits of Mercury and Venus, Moskowitz proposed overlaying the respective planetary symbol on that of the Sun, extending the crossbar into an arrow: (Mercury), (Venus). This also has some limited use.

Limited use can also be found of Moskowitz's symbol for Halley's Comet,: it is simply the standard comet symbol with an H.

== See also ==
- Astrological symbols
- Alchemical symbols
- List of common astronomy symbols
- Maya calendar for the logograms used in Maya astronomy
- Solar symbol
- Zodiac
