= George Bishop =

George Bishop is the name of:

- George Bishop (astronomer) (1785–1861), British astronomer
  - George Bishop's Observatory, the observatory built by Bishop in London
- George Bishop (priest) (1852–1939), Australian Anglican, Archdeacon of Kyneton
- George Bishop (footballer) (1901–?), Welsh football player
- George Bishop (civil servant) (1913–1999), British civil servant
- George Bishop (businessman) (born 1937), American oil industry billionaire
- George Bishop (rugby league) (1902–1972), Australian rugby league footballer

== See also ==
- George Bishop Sudworth (1864–1927), American botanist
