= 19 Fortuna =

Main-belt asteroid

- VLT-SPHERE image of Fortuna

Discovery
- Discovered by: John Russell Hind
- Discovery site: George Bishop's Observatory
- Discovery date: 22 August 1852

Designations
- Pronunciation: /fɔːrˈtjuːnə/
- Named after: Fortūna
- Alternative designations: A902 UG
- Minor planet category: Main belt
- Adjectives: Fortunian /fɔːrˈtjuːniən/
- Symbol: (historical)

Orbital characteristics
- Epoch 21 November 2025 (JD 2461000.5)
- Aphelion: 2.828 AU
- Perihelion: 2.056 AU
- Semi-major axis: 2.442 AU
- Eccentricity: 0.159
- Orbital period (sidereal): 3.816 yr (1393.907 d)
- Mean anomaly: 96.500°
- Inclination: 1.573°
- Longitude of ascending node: 211.001°
- Argument of perihelion: 182.515°
- Earth MOID: 1.062 AU
- Jupiter MOID: 2.601 AU
- T_{Jupiter}: 3.483

Physical characteristics
- Dimensions: (242 × 203 × 192) ± 10 km
- Mean diameter: 211±2 km
- Mass: (8.53±0.10)×10^{18} kg (2025) (Note: Calculated from its standard gravitational parameter GM = 0.569±0.007 km^{3}/s^{2}.) (8.11±0.62)×10^{18} kg (2023)
- Mean density: 1.73±0.05 g/cm^{3} (2025); 1.65±0.13 g/cm^{3} (2023)
- Equatorial surface gravity: ~0.0629 m/s²
- Equatorial escape velocity: ~0.1190 km/s
- Synodic rotation period: 7.443224±0.000001 h
- Axial tilt: 29°
- Pole ecliptic longitude: 103°±3°
- Pole ecliptic latitude: 60°±3°
- Geometric albedo: 0.056; 0.037
- Temperature: ~180 K
- Spectral type: G
- Apparent magnitude: 8.88 to 12.95
- Absolute magnitude (H): 7.49; 7.13
- Angular diameter: 0.25" to 0.072"

19 Fortuna is one of the largest main-belt asteroids. It has a composition similar to 1 Ceres: a darkly colored surface that is heavily space-weathered with the composition of primitive organic compounds, including tholins.

Fortuna is 225 km in diameter and has one of the darkest known geometric albedos for an asteroid over 150 km in diameter. Its albedo has been measured at 0.028 and 0.037. The spectra of the asteroid displays evidence of aqueous alteration.

== History ==
=== Discovery ===
Fortuna was discovered by English astronomer John Russell Hind on the evening of 22 August 1852. He was observing from George Bishop's Observatory in London, England, when he spotted a magnitude 9 object with a yellowish color (possibly caused by the atmosphere). His discovery was announced in the scientific journal Astronomische Nachrichten on 31 August.

=== Name and symbol ===
Soon after discovery, the observatory's owner George Bishop encouraged Hind to choose a name for the asteroid. He chose "Fortuna", after the Roman goddess of fortune and misfortune. No astronomical symbol was provided in Hind's discovery announcements. A symbol of a star over Fortune's wheel (U+1CECC 𜻌) appeared in the book An Astronomical Vocabulary, written by Hind and published on the year of Fortuna's discovery, but no explanation for the symbol was provided.

== Orbit ==
Fortuna orbits the Sun with an average distance (or semi-major axis of 2.44 astronomical units (AU), an orbital period of 3.82 years, and an orbital inclination of 1.57°, placing it within the inner main asteroid belt. Along its elliptical orbit, its distance from the Sun varies between 2.06 AU at perihelion to 2.83 AU at aphelion due to an orbital eccentricity of 0.16. It does not belong to any known asteroid family, making it a background asteroid.

== Physical characteristics ==
The Hubble Space Telescope observed Fortuna in 1993. It was resolved with an apparent diameter of 0.20 arcseconds (4.5 pixels in the Planetary Camera) and its shape was found to be nearly spherical. Satellites were searched for but none were detected.

Stellar occultations by Fortuna have been observed several times. Fortuna has been studied by radar.

Fortuna has been perturbed by the 80 km 135 Hertha and was initially estimated by Baer to have a mass of 1.08×10^{19} kg. A more recent estimate by Baer suggests it has a mass of 1.27×10^{19} kg.
