= 1897 Hind =

Stony main-belt asteroid

Discovery
- Discovered by: L. Kohoutek
- Discovery site: Bergedorf Obs.
- Discovery date: 26 October 1971

Designations
- Named after: John Russell Hind (English astronomer)
- Alternative designations: 1971 UE_{1} · 1957 SG
- Minor planet category: main-belt · Flora

Orbital characteristics
- Epoch 4 September 2017 (JD 2458000.5)
- Uncertainty parameter 0
- Observation arc: 61.03 yr (22,291 days)
- Aphelion: 2.6088 AU
- Perihelion: 1.9565 AU
- Semi-major axis: 2.2826 AU
- Eccentricity: 0.1429
- Orbital period (sidereal): 3.45 yr (1,260 days)
- Mean anomaly: 155.47°
- Mean motion: 0° 17^{m} 8.88^{s} / day
- Inclination: 4.0545°
- Longitude of ascending node: 63.423°
- Argument of perihelion: 269.03°

Physical characteristics
- Dimensions: 5.007±0.103 km 5.67 km (calculated)
- Synodic rotation period: 0.82±0.01 h 2.6336±0.0001 h
- Geometric albedo: 0.24 (assumed); 0.307±0.024; 0.3075±0.0240
- Spectral type: S
- Absolute magnitude (H): 13.4 · 13.81±0.72

1897 Hind, provisional designation 1971 UE_{1}, is a Florian asteroid from the inner regions of the asteroid belt, approximately 5 kilometers in diameter. It was discovered on 26 October 1971, by Czech astronomer Luboš Kohoutek at Bergedorf Observatory in Hamburg, Germany. The asteroid was named after English astronomer John Russell Hind.

== Orbit and classification ==
Hind is a member of the Flora family, one of the largest groups of stony asteroids in the main-belt. It orbits the Sun in the inner main-belt at a distance of 2.0–2.6 AU once every 3 years and 5 months (1,260 days). Its orbit has an eccentricity of 0.14 and an inclination of 4° with respect to the ecliptic.

A first precovery was taken at Palomar Observatory in 1956, extending the asteroid's observation arc by 15 years prior to its discovery.

== Physical characteristics ==
Hind has been characterized as a stony S-type asteroid.

=== Diameter and albedo ===
According to the survey carried out by the NEOWISE mission of NASA's Wide-field Infrared Survey Explorer, Hind measures 5.0 kilometers in diameter and its surface has an albedo of 0.307, while the Collaborative Asteroid Lightcurve Link assumes a standard albedo of 0.24 – derived from 8 Flora, the family's largest member and namesake – and calculates a diameter of 5.7 kilometers with an absolute magnitude of 13.4.

=== Rotation period ===
In July 2005, Hind had originally been identified as a relatively fast rotator, as photometric observations by astronomers Reiner Stoss, Jaime Nomen, Salvador Sánchez and Raoul Behrend gave a rotation period of 0.82±0.01 hours, or less than 50 minutes (U=1). However, the lightcurve was only fragmentary. In August 2012, it was superseded with more accurate observation at the Australian Riverland Dingo Observatory that gave a slower period of 2.6336±0.0001 hours with a brightness variation of 0.09 in magnitude (U=2).

== Naming ==
This minor planet was named after English astronomer John Russell Hind (1823–1895), discoverer of ten minor planets including 7 Iris and 8 Flora, the namesake of the family the asteroid belongs to. Hind worked for many years at George Bishop's Observatory near London where he made his discoveries. He was also superintendent of the British Nautical Almanac Office in the second half of the 19th century. The official naming citation was published by the Minor Planet Center on 1 June 1975 (M.P.C. 3827).
