= V841 Ophiuchi =

Nova seen in 1848 in the constellation Ophiuchus

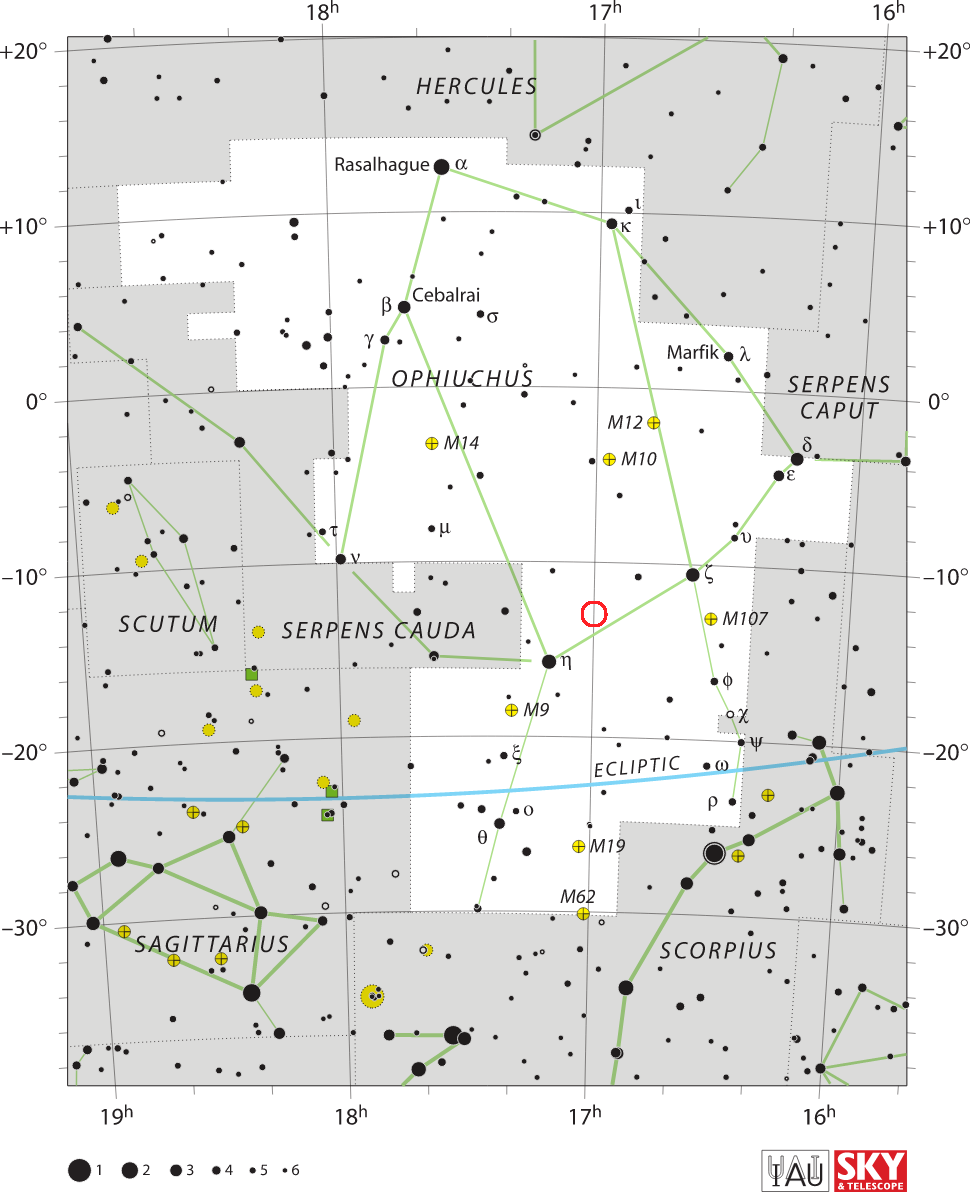
- Location of V841 Ophiuchi (circled in red)

Observation data Epoch J2000.0 Equinox J2000.0
- Constellation: Ophiuchus
- Right ascension: 16^{h} 59^{m} 30.375^{s}
- Declination: −12° 53′ 27.14″
- Apparent magnitude (V): 4.3 - 13.5

Characteristics
- Variable type: classical nova

Astrometry
| Distance | 823+20 −17 pc |

Other designations
- V841 Oph, Nova Ophiuchi 1848, AAVSO 1653-12

Database references
| SIMBAD | data |

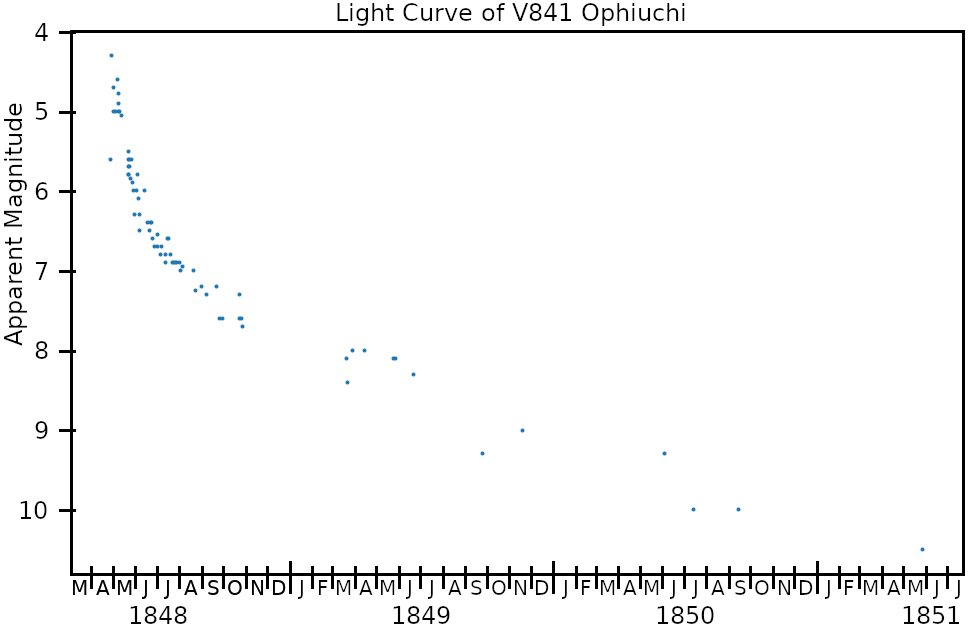
The light curve for V841 Ophiuchi is shown. The data are from the AAVSO website and Parenago.

V841 Ophiuchi (Nova Ophiuchi 1848) was a bright nova discovered by John Russell Hind on 27 April 1848. It was the first object of its type discovered since 1670. At the time of its discovery, it had an apparent magnitude of 5.6, but may have reached magnitude 2 at its peak, making it easily visible to the naked eye. Near peak brightness it was described as "bright red" or "scarlet", probably due to Hα line emission. Its brightness is currently varying slowly around magnitude 13.5. The area of the sky surrounding this nova had been examined frequently by astronomers prior to the nova's discovery, because it was near the reported location of "52 Serpentis", a star John Flamsteed had included in his catalogue with erroneous coordinates.

Like all cataclysmic variable (CV) stars, novae are short-period binary stars with a "donor" star transferring material to a white dwarf. In the case of V841 Ophiuchi, the orbital period is 14.43 hours, which is unusually long for a CV; the vast majority of such systems have periods below 10 hours. Peters and Thorstensen derive an orbital inclination of 30°±10° with respect to our line of sight which, combined with the relatively large separation implied by the orbital period, would explain why V841 Ophiuchi is not an eclipsing binary. They also found that the donor star is somewhat cooler than the Sun, likely early K-type or late G-type.

Modern observations during a 30-year time interval show that V841 Ophiuchi undergoes regular brightness variations with a period of 3.4 years, and an amplitude of about 0.3 magnitudes, which may be due to oscillations in the donor star similar to our Sun's solar cycle. Non-periodic "flickering" brightness variations have been reported, on timescales as short as 100 seconds.
