= George Bishop's Observatory =

English observatory (1836–1861)

Bishop Observatory
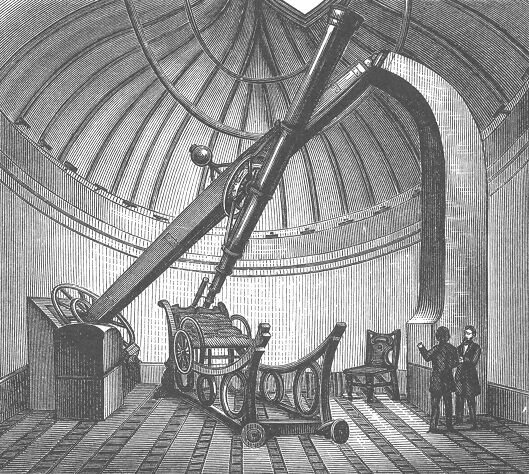
- Bishop Observatory in 1850
- Alternative names: George Bishop's Observatory
- Observatory code: 969
- Location: London, City of Westminster, United Kingdom
- Coordinates: 51°31′30″N 0°09′17″W
- Location of George Bishop's Observatory
- Related media on Commons

George Bishop's Observatory (code: 969) was an astronomical observatory erected in 1836 by the astronomer George Bishop near his residence at the South Villa of Regent's Park, London. It was equipped with a 7-inch (180 mm) Dollond refractor.

== Description ==
The Reverend William Rutter Dawes conducted his noted investigations of double stars at the observatory from 1839 to 1844; John Russell Hind began his career there in October of the following year. From the time that Karl Ludwig Hencke's detection of Astræa, 8 December 1845, showed a prospect of success in the search for new planets, the resources of Bishop's observatory were turned in that direction, and with conspicuous results. Between 1847 and 1854 Hind discovered ten minor planets at the observatory, and Albert Marth one. Other notable astronomers to use the observatory included Eduard Vogel, Charles George Talmage, and Norman Robert Pogson.

The observatory closed when Bishop died in 1861, and in 1863 the instruments and dome were moved to the residence of George Bishop, junior, at Meadowbank, Twickenham, where a new observatory was constructed to follow the same system of work. Twickenham Observatory closed in 1877 and the instruments were given to the Astronomical Observatory of Capodimonte in Italy. Regent's College London now stands on the site of the observatory.

== Minor planets discovered ==
The following minor planets were discovered at George Bishop's Observatory:

Name	Discovery date	Discoverer	Refs
7 Iris	13 August 1847	John Russell Hind	JPL · MPC
8 Flora	18 October 1847	John Russell Hind	JPL · MPC
12 Victoria	13 September 1850	John Russell Hind	JPL · MPC
14 Irene	19 May 1851	John Russell Hind	JPL · MPC
18 Melpomene	24 June 1852	John Russell Hind	JPL · MPC
19 Fortuna	22 August 1852	John Russell Hind	JPL · MPC
22 Kalliope	16 November 1852	John Russell Hind	JPL · MPC
23 Thalia	15 December 1852	John Russell Hind	JPL · MPC
27 Euterpe	8 November 1853	John Russell Hind	JPL · MPC
29 Amphitrite	1 March 1854	Albert Marth	JPL · MPC
30 Urania	22 July 1854	John Russell Hind	JPL · MPC
