= 27 Euterpe =

Main-belt asteroid

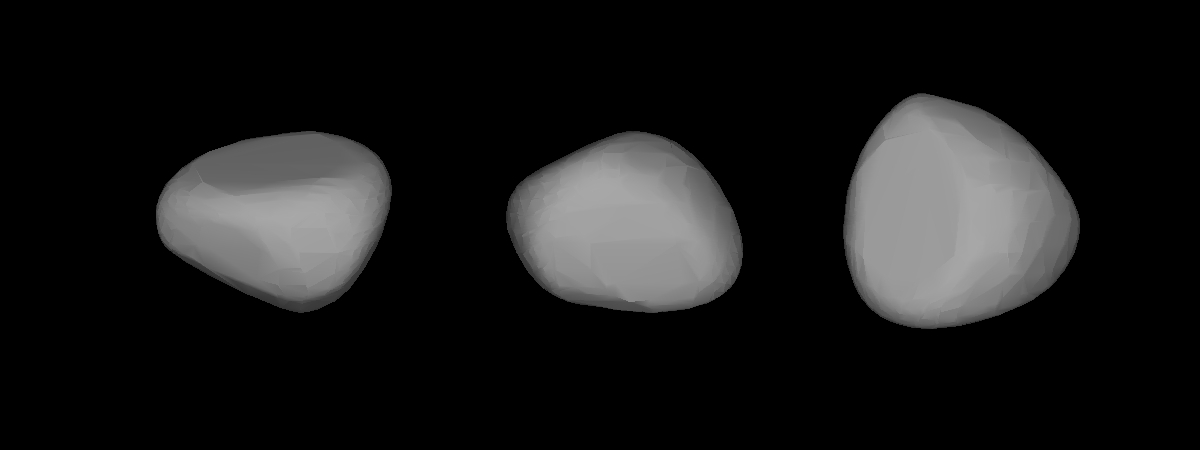
- Lightcurve-based 3D-model of Euterpe

Discovery
- Discovered by: J. R. Hind
- Discovery site: George Bishop's Obs.
- Discovery date: 8 November 1853

Designations
- Pronunciation: /juːˈtɜːrpiː/
- Named after: Euterpe (Greek mythology)
- Alternative designations: 1945 KB
- Minor planet category: main-belt · (inner); Euterpe
- Adjectives: Euterpean /juːˈtɜːrpiən/

Orbital characteristics
- Epoch 4 September 2017 (JD 2458000.5)
- Uncertainty parameter 0
- Observation arc: 163.48 yr (59,711 days)
- Aphelion: 2.7524 AU
- Perihelion: 1.9401 AU
- Semi-major axis: 2.3463 AU
- Eccentricity: 0.1731
- Orbital period (sidereal): 3.59 yr (1,313 days)
- Mean anomaly: 170.66°
- Mean motion: 0° 16^{m} 27.12^{s} / day
- Inclination: 1.5837°
- Longitude of ascending node: 94.789°
- Time of perihelion: 2026-Oct-04
- Argument of perihelion: 356.55°

Physical characteristics
- Dimensions: 124 × 75 km (occultation)
- Mean diameter: 105.80±7.23 km (composite estimate) Individual estimates: 96 km; 96.9 km; 109.79±1.54 km; 118 km; 118.000±22.30 km
- Mass: (1.50±0.10)×10^{18} kg (Note: Calculated from its standard gravitational parameter GM = 0.100±0.007 km^{3}/s^{2}.)
- Mean density: 3.23 g/cm^{3} (Note: Assuming a diameter of 96 km.)
- Synodic rotation period: 8.500 h 10.377±0.008 h 10.40193±0.00005 h 10.404±0.001 h 10.407±0.002 h 10.4082±0.0001 h 10.410±0.002 h (Note: Lightcurve plot of 27 Euterpe, R. D. Stephens (lead) and B. D. Warner at the Palmer Divide Observatory (2000): rotation period 10.410±0.002 hours with a brightness amplitude of 0.21±0.01 mag. Summary figures at the LCDB); 10.41 h
- Geometric albedo: 0.20±0.03; 0.2011±0.0582; 0.215±0.033; 0.234±0.008; 0.298
- Spectral type: Tholen = S SMASS = S · S B–V = 0.878; U–B = 0.502
- Absolute magnitude (H): 7.00 · 7.01±0.02
- Angular diameter: 0.13" to 0.035"

27 Euterpe is a stony asteroid and parent body of the Euterpe family, located in the inner asteroid belt, approximately 100 kilometers in diameter. It was discovered by English astronomer John Russell Hind at George Bishop's Observatory in London on 8 November 1853. The asteroid was named after Euterpe, the Muse of music in Greek mythology.

Euterpe is one of the brightest asteroids in the night sky. It had an apparent magnitude of 8.5 during a perihelic opposition on 25 December 2015 when the asteroid was about 1 AU from Earth. At the end of November 2022 it passed about 1.5 degrees from Uranus while in the constellation of Aries. Based on the S-type spectra the composition appears stony. It has a cross-section size of around 100–120 km. 27 Euterpe is orbiting the Sun with a period of 3.59 years and is spinning on its axis once every 10.4 hours.

It is the parent body of the Euterpe family (410), a stony inner-belt asteroid family of nearly 400 known members. Euterpe has been studied by radar.
