= C/1847 C1 (Hind) =

Non-periodic comet

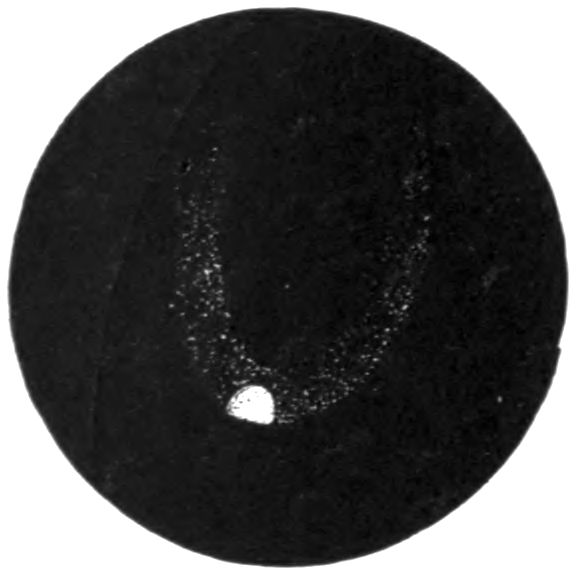
- Hind's Comet visible in broad daylight on 30 March 1847

Discovery
- Discovered by: John Russell Hind
- Discovery site: London, England
- Discovery date: 6 February 1847

Designations
- Alternative designations: 1847 I

Orbital characteristics
- Epoch: 9 April 1847 (JD 2395760.5)
- Observation arc: 77 days
- Number of observations: 160
- Aphelion: ~945 AU
- Perihelion: 0.043 AU
- Semi-major axis: ~475 AU
- Eccentricity: 0.99991
- Orbital period: ~10,300 years
- Inclination: 48.664°
- Longitude of ascending node: 23.824°
- Argument of periapsis: 254.36°
- Mean anomaly: 0.0009°
- Last perihelion: 30 March 1847
- T_{Jupiter}: 0.180

Physical characteristics
- Comet total magnitude (M1): 6.8
- Apparent magnitude: 4.3 (1847 apparition)

Hind's Comet, formally designated as C/1847 C1, is a non-periodic comet that became visible to the naked eye in March 1847. It is the second comet discovered by English astronomer John Russell Hind, the first being C/1846 O1 (de Vico–Hind).
