= 18 Melpomene =

Main-belt asteroid

- VLT-SPHERE image of Melpomene

Discovery
- Discovered by: John Russell Hind
- Discovery date: 24 June 1852

Designations
- Pronunciation: /mɛlˈpɒmɪniː/
- Named after: Melpomenē
- Minor planet category: Main belt
- Adjectives: Melpomenean /mɛlpɒmɪˈniːən/
- Symbol: (historical)

Orbital characteristics
- Epoch 21 November 2025 (JD 2461000.5)
- Uncertainty parameter 0
- Aphelion: 2.796 AU (418.3 million km)
- Perihelion: 1.795 AU (268.5 million km)
- Semi-major axis: 2.296 AU (343.5 million km)
- Eccentricity: 0.218
- Orbital period (sidereal): 1,270.37 d (3.48 yr)
- Mean anomaly: 113.8711°
- Inclination: 10.131°
- Longitude of ascending node: 150.330°
- Time of perihelion: 4 March 2027
- Argument of perihelion: 228.052°
- Jupiter MOID: 2.693 AU (402.9 million km)
- T_{Jupiter}: 3.543

Physical characteristics
- Dimensions: 161 × 135 × 131 km (± 8 × 8 × 7 km)
- Mean diameter: 141±2 km
- Mass: (3.60±0.19)×10^{18} kg (Note: Calculated from its standard gravitational parameter GM = 0.240±0.013 km^{3}/s^{2}.)
- Mean density: 2.45±0.17 g/cm^{3}
- Synodic rotation period: 11.570306±0.000005 h
- Axial tilt: 64°
- Pole ecliptic longitude: 12°±2°
- Pole ecliptic latitude: 19°±2°
- Geometric albedo: 0.221 (calculated); 0.223; 0.181 ± 0.033
- Spectral type: S
- Apparent magnitude: 7.5 to 12.0
- Absolute magnitude (H): 6.35; 6.51
- Angular diameter: 0.23" to 0.059"

18 Melpomene is a large, bright asteroid in the main asteroid belt. It was discovered by John Russell Hind on 24 June 1852, and named after Melpomenē, the Muse of tragedy in Greek mythology.

== History ==
=== Discovery ===
Melpomene was discovered by English astronomer John Russell Hind on the evening of 24 June 1852. That night, he was observing from George Bishop's Observatory in London, England. Looking at a section of the sky in the 18th hour of right ascension, he spotted a new starlike object with a magnitude of 9. He immediately concluded that it was a "new planet" between the orbits of Mars and Jupiter. The asteroid's discovery—Hind's fifth—was announced in the astronomical journal Astronomische Nachrichten on 30 June 1852.

=== Name and symbol ===
George Bishop, the observatory's owner, invited astronomer George Biddell Airy to name the asteroid. Airy chose Melpomene; in Greek mythology, Melpomene was the Muse of tragedy. In a letter to fellow astronomer David Gill, he explained:

I look upon her as my planet for the following reason which you will not find in books. On 1839 June 24 I lost my noble boy Arthur. On 1852 June 24 (just 13 years later) I lost my dear daughter Elizabeth. And, while feeling that day of sorrow, I learnt that on that day a planet was discovered which I was requested to name. So I fixed on the name of the Muse of sadness.

— George B. Airy, In a letter to David Gill

Melpomene was not assigned a symbol upon discovery. One was later published in Hind's 1852 book An Astronomical Vocabulary, appearing as a dagger over a star (U+1CECB 𜻋).

== Orbit ==
Melpomene orbits the Sun at an average distance (semi-major axis) of 2.30 astronomical units (AU), within the main asteroid belt. It has an orbital period of 3.48 Earth years. Having an elliptical orbit with an orbital eccentricity of 0.22, its distance from the Sun ranges from 1.80 AU at perihelion to 2.80 AU at aphelion. Its orbit is inclined by 10° with respect to the ecliptic plane.

== Physical characteristics ==
Melpomene is classified as a stony S-type asteroid.

Melpomene occulted the star SAO 114159 on 11 December 1978. A possible Melpomenean satellite with a diameter of at least 37 km was detected. The satellite candidate received a provisional designation S/1978 (18) 1. In 1988 a search for satellites or dust orbiting this asteroid was performed using the UH88 telescope at the Mauna Kea Observatories, but the effort came up empty. Melpomene was observed with the Hubble Space Telescope in 1993. It was able to resolve the asteroid's slightly elongated shape, but no satellites were detected.

Melpomene has been studied by radar. Photometric observations during 2012 provided a rotation period of 11.571±0.001 h with a brightness variation of 0.34±0.02 in magnitude, which is consistent with previous studies. It has a mean diameter of 141±2 km.
