= 30 Urania =

Main-belt asteroid

- VLT-SPHERE image of Urania

Discovery
- Discovered by: J. R. Hind
- Discovery date: 22 July 1854

Designations
- Pronunciation: /jʊəˈreɪniə/ yoor-AY-nee-ə
- Named after: Urania
- Alternative designations: 1948 JK
- Minor planet category: Main belt
- Symbol: (astrological)

Orbital characteristics
- Epoch 17.0 October 2024 (JD 2460600.5)
- Aphelion: 398.863 Gm (2.666 AU)
- Perihelion: 309.039 Gm (2.066 AU)
- Semi-major axis: 353.951 Gm (2.366 AU)
- Eccentricity: 0.127
- Orbital period (sidereal): 1,329.308 d (3.64 a)
- Mean anomaly: 211.291°
- Inclination: 2.093°
- Longitude of ascending node: 307.403°
- Argument of perihelion: 87.100°
- Earth MOID: 1.07287 AU
- Jupiter MOID: 2.74597 AU
- T_{Jupiter}: 3.536

Physical characteristics
- Dimensions: 112 × 84 × 76 km (± 5 × 5 × 4 km)
- Mean diameter: 88±2 km
- Mass: (8.24±0.90)×10^{17} kg (Note: Calculated from its standard gravitational parameter GM = 0.055±0.006 km^{3}/s^{2}.)
- Mean density: 2.30±0.29 g/cm^{3}
- Synodic rotation period: 13.686 h (0.5703 d)
- Axial tilt: 72°
- Pole ecliptic longitude: 106°±2°
- Pole ecliptic latitude: 19°±2°
- Geometric albedo: 0.214 (calculated); 0.192 ± 0.027
- Spectral type: S
- Apparent magnitude: 9.36 (brightest)
- Absolute magnitude (H): 7.59; 7.57

30 Urania is a large main-belt asteroid that was discovered by English astronomer John Russell Hind on 22 July 1854. It was his last asteroid discovery. This object is named after Urania, the Greek Muse of astronomy. Initial orbital elements for 30 Urania were published by Wilhelm Günther, an assistant at Breslau Observatory. It is orbiting the Sun with a period of 3.64 years and is spinning on its axis once every 13.7 hours.

Based upon its spectrum, this is classified as a stony S-type asteroid. During 2000, speckle interferometry measurements from the Telescopio Nazionale Galileo in the Canary Islands were used to measure the apparent size and shape of 30 Urania. This gave cross-sectional dimensions equivalent to an ellipse with a length of 111 km and a width of 89 km, for a ratio of 0.80.

The astrological symbol for Urania is, compass calipers.
