= 12 Victoria =

Large main-belt asteroid

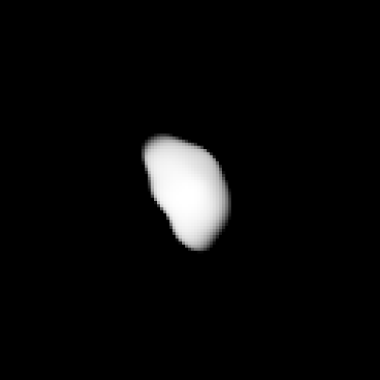
- VLT adaptive optics image on 8 November 2018

Discovery
- Discovered by: John Russell Hind
- Discovery site: George Bishop's Observatory
- Discovery date: 13 September 1850

Designations
- Pronunciation: /vɪkˈtɔːriə/
- Named after: Victoria (Latin: Uictōria)
- Minor planet category: Main belt
- Adjectives: Victorian
- Symbol: (historical) (variant)

Orbital characteristics
- Epoch 21 November 2025 (JD 2461000.5)
- Uncertainty parameter 0
- Observation arc: 175.17 yr
- Aphelion: 2.84712 AU
- Perihelion: 1.82055 AU
- Semi-major axis: 2.33384 AU
- Eccentricity: 0.21993
- Orbital period (sidereal): 3.56545 yr (1302.28 d)
- Average orbital speed: 19.50 km/s
- Mean anomaly: 76.9360°
- Mean motion: 0° 16^{m} 34.914^{s} / day
- Inclination: 8.37403°
- Longitude of ascending node: 235.353°
- Time of perihelion: 15 February 2025
- Argument of perihelion: 69.5463°
- Earth MOID: 0.82426 AU
- Jupiter MOID: 2.4223 AU
- T_{Jupiter}: 3.522

Physical characteristics
- Dimensions: 140 × 116 × 96 km (± 4 × 3 × 3 km)
- Mean diameter: 116±2 km
- Mass: (1.83±0.12)×10^{18} kg (Note: Calculated from its standard gravitational parameter GM = 0.122±0.008 km^{3}/s^{2}.)
- Mean density: 2.23±0.19 g/cm^{3}
- Equatorial surface gravity: 0.0315 m/s²
- Equatorial escape velocity: 0.0596 km/s
- Synodic rotation period: 8.660345±0.000005 h
- Axial tilt: 110°
- Pole ecliptic longitude: 177°±2°
- Pole ecliptic latitude: −27°±3°
- Geometric albedo: 0.167 (calculated); 0.163 ± 0.027
- Temperature: ~178 K
- Spectral type: S (Tholen); L (SMASS); A
- Apparent magnitude: 8.68 to 12.82
- Absolute magnitude (H): 7.30; 7.24
- Angular diameter: 0.188" to 0.04"

12 Victoria is a large asteroid located in the main belt. It was the twelfth known asteroid, discovered on 13 September 1850 by English astronomer John R. Hind from George Bishop's Observatory in London, England. It was named after Victoria, the ancient Roman goddess of victory. The name's coincidence with that of then-reigning Queen Victoria led to an extended controversy, with American astronomers objecting to its use. In place of Victoria, the alternative name Clio was used in American publications until the late 19th century.

Victoria is around 116 kilometres (72 mi) in diameter and irregular in shape. It orbits the Sun at an average distance of 2.33 astronomical units on a 3.57 year long orbit. It is thought to be a stony S-type asteroid, and it rotates once every 8.66 hours.

== History ==
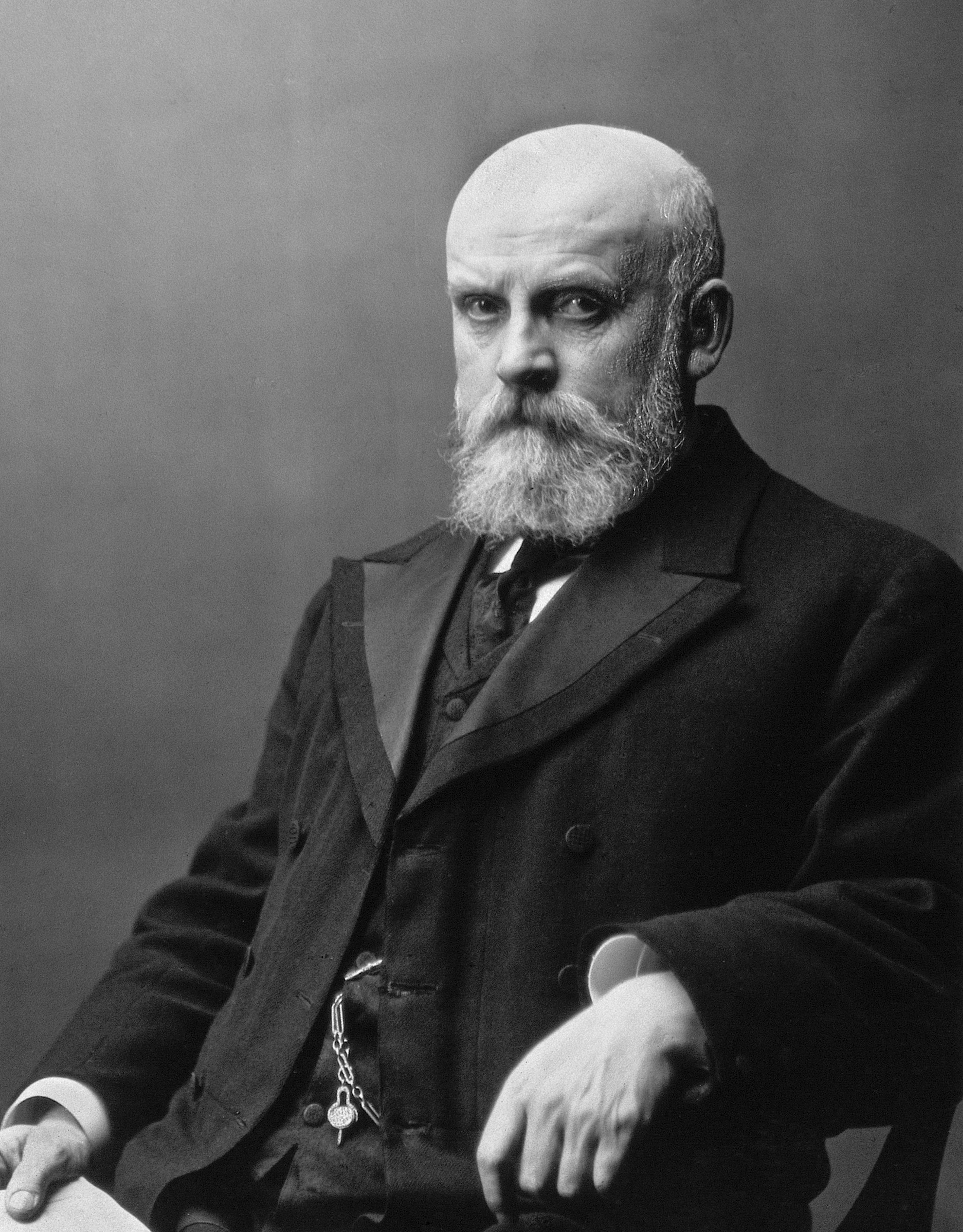
John R. Hind discovered Victoria on 13 September 1850.

Victoria was discovered by English astronomer John R. Hind on the evening of 13 September 1850. At that time, Hind was observing in the constellation Pegasus from George Bishop's Observatory in London, England. He was comparing a recently created star map against his observations to inspect its accuracy and check for any changes in stellar apparent magnitudes. Near a magnitude 10 star, he noticed a slightly brighter object. Since it would have been picked up in previous sweeps of that area of the sky, Hind immediately concluded that it was a new planet. (Note: At the time of Victoria's discovery, asteroids were frequently called planets. They would later be reclassified as "minor planets".) He announced his discovery in the journal Astronomische Nachrichten on 27 September, and letters detailing the discovery circumstances were published in Monthly Notices of the Royal Astronomical Society on 8 November 1850. Victoria was the third asteroid discovered by Hind and the twelfth discovered in history. Hind would later go on to discover seven more asteroids; all of his asteroid discoveries took place between 1847 and 1854.

=== Naming and controversy ===
Hind chose to name the newly discovered asteroid after the deity Victoria from ancient Roman religion. Victoria, daughter of the Titan Pallas, was the Roman personification of victory. The chosen name also honoured then-reigning Queen Victoria, though indirectly. Prior asteroids' names, while mythological in nature, were chosen to link the asteroid to the nationality of its discoverer (such as Parthenope and Egeria for Annibale de Gasparis's discoveries). Hind nevertheless sought his fellow astronomers' approval for the name on mythological grounds, stating that it was not exclusively chosen for its relation to the queen.

Despite Hind's rationale, American astronomers objected to the name due to its coincidence with a reigning sovereign, starting a long controversy over the asteroid nomenclature practices that would later involve many other minor planets. Benjamin A. Gould, editor of The Astronomical Journal, wrote of Hind's choice of naming:

Such nomenclature is at variance with established usage, and liable to the objections which have very properly led astronomers to reject the names "Medicean Stars," "Georgium Sidus," "Ceres Ferdinanden," &c., and even those of the astronomers Herschel and Le Verrier, for the adoption of whose names some arguments might be adduced.

— Benjamin A. Gould, in The Astronomical Journal vol. 1, iss. 17 (published October 1850) (Note: "Medicean Stars," "Georgium Sidus," and "Ceres Ferdinanden" refer to proposed names for the Galilean moons, Uranus, and 1 Ceres, respectively. Likewise, "Herschel" and "Le Verrier" were proposed names for Uranus and Neptune, respectively.)

In response to Gould's objections, Hind proposed Clio as an alternative. American astronomers adopted Clio, using it in place of Victoria in journal publications—to the frustration of British astronomer George B. Airy. William C. Bond nevertheless affirmed that the name Victoria fulfilled the conditions for mythological nomenclature, an opinion that was supported by a majority of astronomers. Some reference works continued using Clio in place of Victoria for some time; The Astronomical Journal labelled the asteroid as Clio until at least 1853, as did the textbook High-School Astronomy in 1872. The name Clio would eventually be reused for the 84th asteroid, 84 Klio, in 1865.

=== Symbol ===
In his announcement of Victoria's discovery, Hind described his chosen symbol as "a star and a laurel branch, emblematic of the Goddess of Victory". Several variants of the symbol developed, such as one with a two-branch laurel wreath symbolizing victory and one with a laurel wreath and a figure resembling a flag. In the 1864 edition of Webster's Dictionary, the wreath was drawn as a simple arc around a central star. The two-branched variant was encoded in Unicode 17.0 as U+1CEC5 (𜻅).

== Orbit ==
Victoria orbits the Sun at an average distance—its semi-major axis—of 2.33 astronomical units (AU), taking 3.57 years to complete one revolution. Along its orbit, its distance from the Sun varies between 1.82 AU at perihelion to 2.85 AU at aphelion due to its orbital eccentricity of 0.22. Its orbit is inclined by 8.37° with respect to the ecliptic plane.

Victoria's orbital elements place it near the Klio family, an extensive asteroid family associated with Klio and dominated by primitive C-type asteroids. However, since Victoria is a non-primitive asteroid with a more reflective surface, it is an interloper that is not related to Klio family members.

It will have a favorable perihelic opposition in June 2028 when it will be apparent magnitude 8.8 and 0.88 AU (132 million km; 82 million mi) from Earth.

== Physical characteristics ==
Simulated view of 12 Victoria's rotation and high axial tilt

Estimates of Victoria's size differ by method; infrared observations from 1983 by IRAS gave a diameter of 113 kilometres (70 mi), while more recent measurements by the Very Large Telescope gave a diameter of about 116 kilometres (72 mi). Victoria is classified as an S-type asteroid under the Tholen classification scheme and an L-type asteroid under the Small Main-belt Asteroid Spectroscopic Survey, Phase II (SMASSII) classification scheme.

Observations of Victoria's lightcurve, or fluctuations in its observed brightness, give a rotation period of about 8.66 hours.

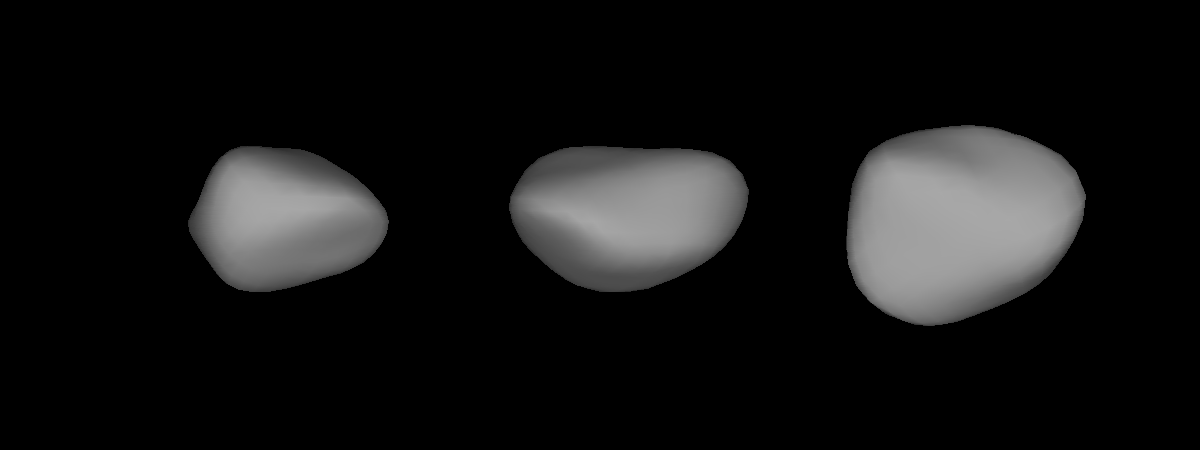
Shape model of Victoria, derived from adaptive optics observations

== See also ==
- Former classification of planets
