= 23 Thalia =

Main-belt asteroid

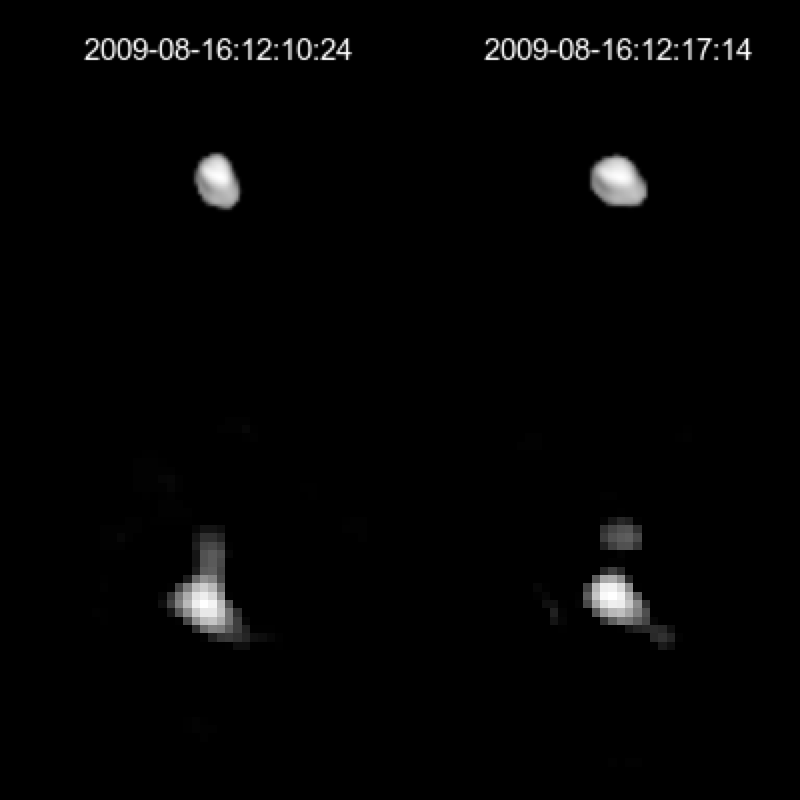
- A three-dimensional model of 23 Thalia based on its light curve with an image of Thalia on the bottom.

Discovery
- Discovered by: J. R. Hind
- Discovery date: 15 December 1852

Designations
- Pronunciation: /θəˈlaɪ.ə/ (Note: Stressed on the second syllable.)
- Named after: Thalia
- Alternative designations: 1938 CL; 1974 QT_{2}
- Minor planet category: Main belt

Orbital characteristics
- Epoch 14 June 2006 (JD 2453900.5)
- Aphelion: 484.663 million km (3.240 AU)
- Perihelion: 301.483 million km (2.015 AU)
- Semi-major axis: 393.073 million km (2.628 AU)
- Eccentricity: 0.233
- Orbital period (sidereal): 1555.679 d (4.26 a)
- Mean anomaly: 328.687°
- Inclination: 10.145°
- Longitude of ascending node: 67.228°
- Time of perihelion: 20 February 2028
- Argument of perihelion: 59.311°

Physical characteristics
- Dimensions: 120 ± 8 km (ADAM)
- Mass: (1.96 ± 0.09) × 10^{18} kg (composite estimate) (2.16±0.31)×10^{18} kg (Note: Calculated from its standard gravitational parameter GM = 0.144±0.009 km^{3}/s^{2}.)
- Mean density: 2.2 ± 0.4 g/cm^{3} 2.38±0.59 g/cm^{3}
- Synodic rotation period: 12.31241 h
- Pole ecliptic longitude: 158° ± 2°/341° ± 3°
- Pole ecliptic latitude: −44° ± 4°/−73° ± 6°
- Geometric albedo: 0.2536 (geometric)
- Spectral type: S
- Apparent magnitude: 9.11 to 13.19
- Absolute magnitude (H): 7.17

23 Thalia (/θəˈlaɪ.ə/) is a large main-belt asteroid. It was discovered by J. R. Hind on 15 December 1852, at the private observatory of W. Bishop, located in Hyde Park, London, England. Bishop named it after Thalia, the Muse of comedy and pastoral poetry in Greek mythology.

It is categorized as an S-type asteroid consisting of mainly of iron- and magnesium-silicates. This the second most common type of asteroid in the main belt. Based on analysis of the light curve, the object has a sidereal rotation period of 0.513202 ± 0.000002 days. An ellipsoidal model of the light curve gives an a/b ratio of 1.28 ± 0.05.

With a semimajor axis of 2.628, the asteroid is orbiting between the 3:1 and 5:2 Kirkwood gaps in the main belt. Its orbital eccentricity is larger than the median value of 0.07 for the main belt, and the inclination is larger than the median of below 4°. But most of the main-belt asteroids have an eccentricity of no more than 0.4 and an inclination of up to 30°, so the orbit of 23 Thalia is not unusual for a main-belt asteroid.

Thalia has been studied by radar.

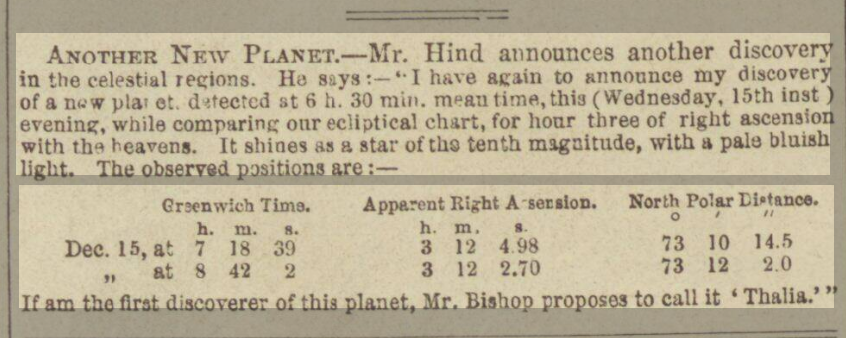
Announcement of the discovery in the Illustrated London News, Saturday 18 December 1852.
