= George Bishop (priest) =

George Nickells Bishop (1852–1939) was an Anglican priest in the first two decades of the nineteenth century and the first four of the twentieth.

Bishop was born in Newton Abbot and later emigrated to Australia. He was ordained deacon in 1880, and priest in 1881. After a curacy at Geelong he held incumbencies in Melbourne and Kyneton, where he was also Archdeacon from 1915 to 1918. His last post was as Chaplain at Melbourne Hospital.
