= 14 Irene =

Main-belt asteroid

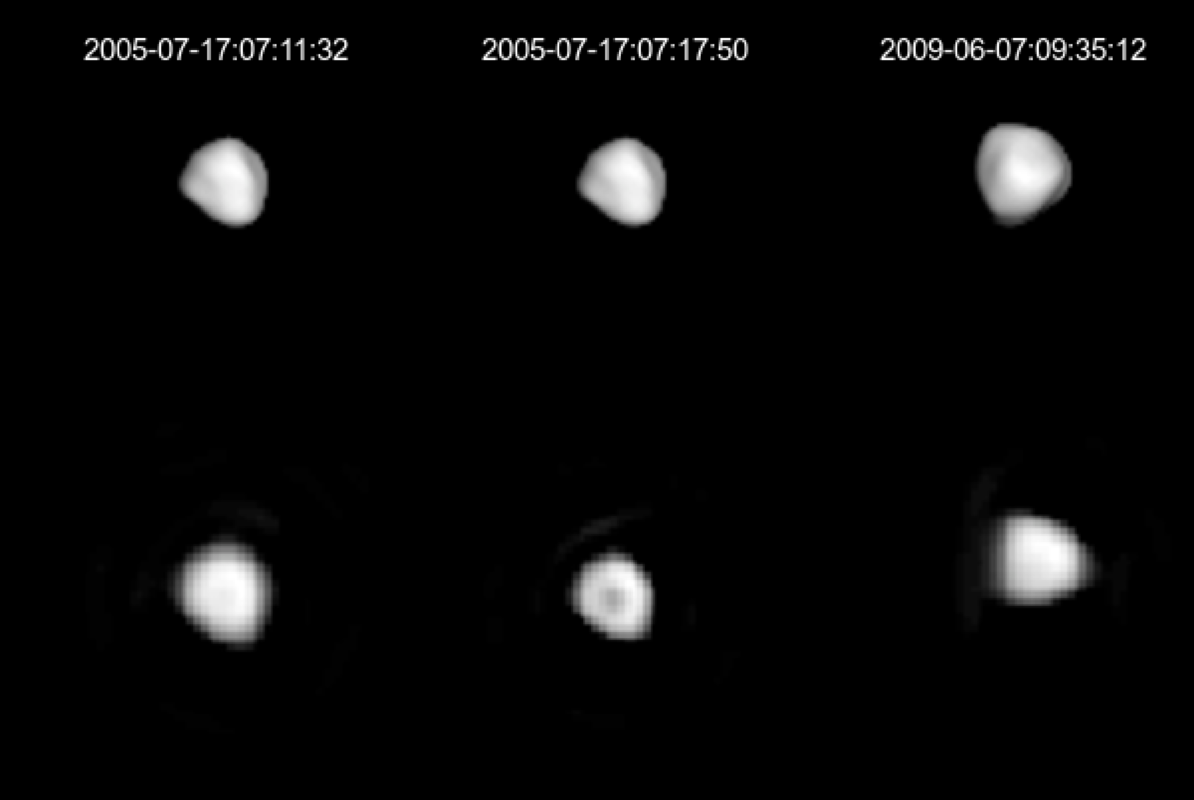
- A three dimensional model of 14 Irene from light curve inversion on the top and images of the asteroid on the bottom.

Discovery
- Discovered by: John Russell Hind
- Discovery site: George Bishop's Observatory
- Discovery date: 20 May 1851

Designations
- Pronunciation: /aɪˈriːniː/
- Named after: Irēnē
- Alternative designations: A906 QC; A913 EA; 1952 TM
- Minor planet category: Main belt
- Adjectives: Irenean /aɪrɪˈniːən/ (< Irenæan)
- Symbol: (historical)

Orbital characteristics
- Epoch 21 November 2025 (JD 2461000.5)
- Aphelion: 3.009 AU
- Perihelion: 2.167 AU
- Semi-major axis: 2.588 AU
- Eccentricity: 0.163
- Orbital period (sidereal): 4.163 yr (1520.59 d)
- Mean anomaly: 12.926°
- Inclination: 9.130°
- Longitude of ascending node: 86.010°
- Time of perihelion: 27 September 2025
- Argument of perihelion: 98.265°
- Jupiter MOID: 2.016 AU
- T_{Jupiter}: 3.385

Physical characteristics
- Dimensions: (167 × 152 × 139) ± 16 km
- Mean diameter: 155 ± 6 km
- Mass: (5.26±0.15)×10^{18} kg (Note: Calculated from its standard gravitational parameter GM = 0.351±0.010 km^{3}/s^{2}.)
- Mean density: 2.70±0.32 g/cm^{3}
- Synodic rotation period: 15.02988 h (0.626245 d)
- Pole ecliptic longitude: 91° ± 7°
- Pole ecliptic latitude: −14° ± 4°
- Geometric albedo: 0.159
- Spectral type: S
- Apparent magnitude: 8.85 to 12.30
- Absolute magnitude (H): 6.
- Angular diameter: 0.17″ to 0.052"

14 Irene (/aɪˈriːniː/) is a large main-belt asteroid, discovered by the English astronomer John Russell Hind on 20 May 1851. It is orbiting the Sun at a distance of 2.585 AU with a period of 4.16 yr and an eccentricity of 0.168. The orbital plane is tilted at an angle of 9.1° to the plane of the ecliptic.

== Observation ==
Observations from 2007 indicate that the rotation pole of 14 Irene lies close to the plane of the ecliptic, indicating it has an obliquity close to 90°. The fairly flat Irenian lightcurves indicate somewhat spherical proportions. This is a stony S-type asteroid with a mean diameter of around 155 km. It is spinning with a rotation period of 15 hours.

There have been seven reported stellar occultation events by Irene. The best is a three chord event observed in 2013.

== History ==
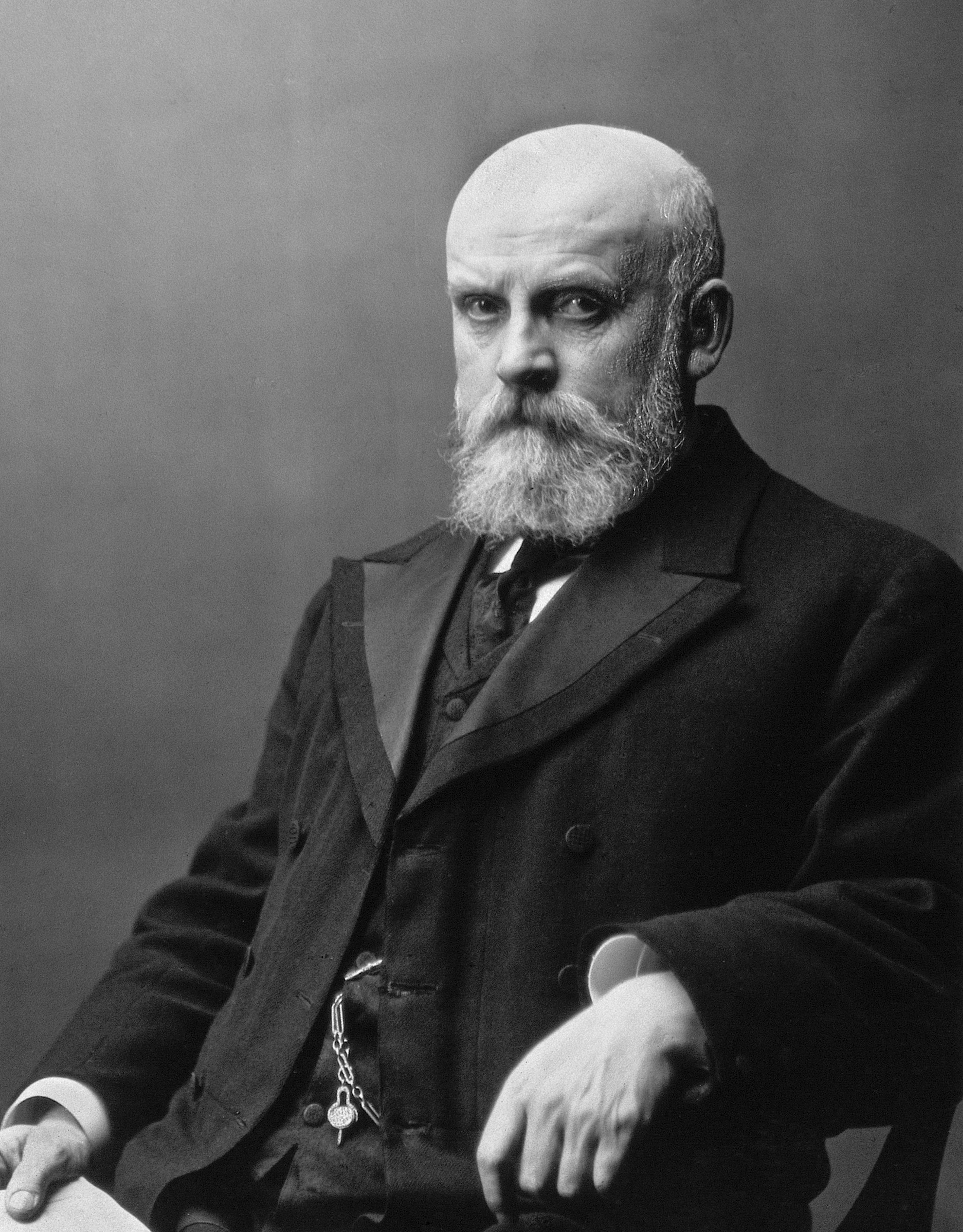
John R. Hind discovered Irene on 20 May 1851.

Irene was discovered by English astronomer John R. Hind on the very early morning of 20 May 1851 from George Bishop's Observatory in London, England. At that time, he was observing near the star Lalande 29490, around the 16th hour of right ascension and 10–15°S of declination in the constellation of Scorpius. For several years prior, he had examined this region of the sky as a nearby star had been erroneously omitted from Wölfer's star charts. Near Lalande 29490, Xi Scorpii, and 50 Librae, (Note: Formerly designated as Psi Librae) he noticed a pale blue object of about the ninth magnitude that had not been recorded before. Since such an object was unlikely to have gone unnoticed in prior sweeps of the area, he quickly suspected its non-stellar nature. This was confirmed by follow-up observations throughout that morning, and Hind announced his discovery of a new planet (Note: At the time of Irene's discovery, asteroids were frequently called planets. They would later be reclassified as "minor planets".) through The London Times on 21 May 1851. Further announcements of the discovery were published by journals such as Astronomische Nachrichten and The Astronomical Journal in the following months. Irene was the fourth asteroid discovered by Hind and the fourteenth discovered in history. Hind would go on to discover a further six asteroids.

=== Naming ===
Irene was named after Irēnē, a personification of peace in Greek mythology. She was one of the Horae, daughter of Zeus and Themis. The name was suggested by Sir John Herschel. Hind wrote,

"You will readily discover that this name [...] has some relation to this event (the Great Industrial Exhibition) which is now filling our metropolis [London] with the talent of all civilised nations, with those of Peace, the productions of Art and Science, in which all mankind must feel an interest."

The Great Exhibition of the Works of Industry of All Nations in the Crystal Palace of Hyde Park, London, ran from 1 May until 18 October 1851.

=== Symbol ===
Hind suggested that the symbol for the asteroid should be "A dove carrying an olive-branch, with a star on its head", but it was hardly drawn before the use of graphical symbols to represent asteroids was dropped entirely. It was included in Unicode 17.0 as U+1CEC7 𜻇.

== Orbit ==
Irene orbits the Sun at an average distance, or semi-major axis, of 2.59 astronomical units (AU), placing it in the main asteroid belt. Along its 4.16 year long orbit, its distance from the Sun varies from 2.17 AU at perihelion to 3.01 AU at aphelion due to its orbital eccentricity of 0.16. Its orbit is inclined by 9° with respect to the ecliptic plane, and it does not belong to any known asteroid family, classifying it as a background asteroid.

== See also ==
- Former classification of planets
