= 26 Proserpina =

Main-belt asteroid

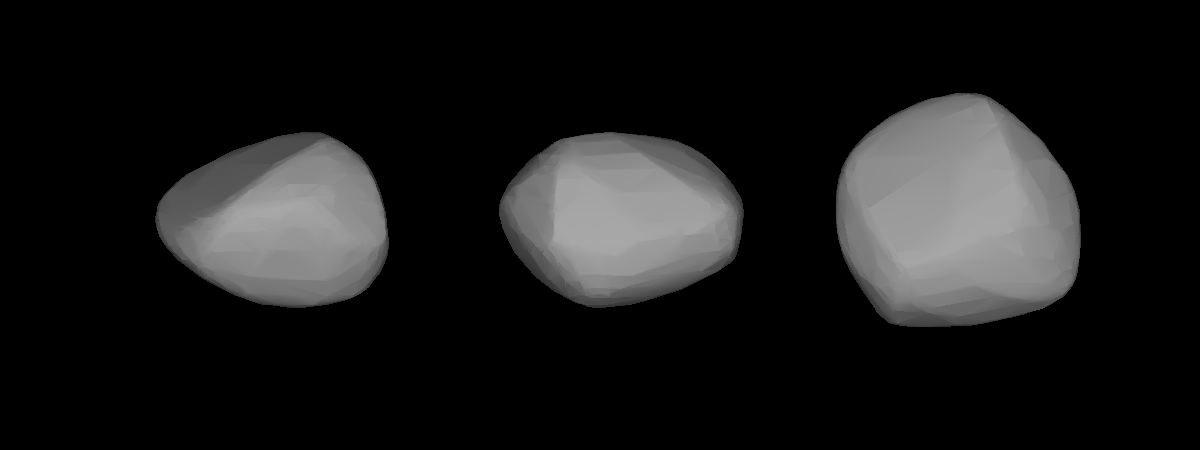
- Three-dimensional model of 26 Proserpina created based on light-curve inversions.

Discovery
- Discovered by: R. Luther
- Discovery date: 5 May 1853

Designations
- Pronunciation: /proʊˈsɜːrpɪnə/
- Named after: Proserpina
- Alternative designations: 1935 KK; 1954 WD_{1}
- Minor planet category: Main belt
- Adjectives: Proserpinian /ˌprɒsərˈpɪniən/
- Symbol: (historical)

Orbital characteristics
- Epoch 21 November 2025 (JD 2461000.5)
- Aphelion: 2.890 AU
- Perihelion: 2.420 AU
- Semi-major axis: 2.655 AU
- Eccentricity: 0.089
- Orbital period (sidereal): 4.327 yr (1580.27 d)
- Mean anomaly: 289.591°
- Inclination: 3.555°
- Longitude of ascending node: 45.685°
- Time of perihelion: 2026-Sep-26
- Argument of perihelion: 196.057°
- Jupiter MOID: 2.106 AU
- T_{Jupiter}: 3.380

Physical characteristics
- Mean diameter: 94.8 ± 1.7 km (IRAS); 89.63 ± 3.55 km (composite estimate)
- Mass: (1.21±0.16)×10^{18} kg (Note: Calculated from its standard gravitational parameter GM = 0.081±0.011 km^{3}/s^{2}.)
- Mean density: 2.74 g/cm^{3} (Note: Assuming a diameter of 94.8 km.)
- Synodic rotation period: 13.11 h
- Geometric albedo: 0.1966
- Spectral type: S
- Absolute magnitude (H): 7.5

26 Proserpina is a main-belt asteroid discovered by German astronomer R. Luther on 5 May 1853. It is named after the Roman goddess Proserpina, the daughter of Ceres and the Queen of the Roman Underworld. Another main-belt asteroid, 399 Persephone, discovered in 1895, is named after her Greek counterpart. Its historical symbol was a star inside a pomegranate; it is encoded in Unicode as U+1CECD 𜻍 ASTRONOMICAL SYMBOL FOR ASTEROID PROSERPINA.

This object is orbiting the Sun with a period of 4.33 years. It has a cross-section size of around 90 km and a stony (S-type) composition. Photometric observations of this asteroid have produced discrepant estimates of the rotation period. A period of 12.13 hours was reported in 1979, followed by 10.6 hours in 1981 and 6.67 hours in 2001. Observations made in 2007 at the Oakley Observatory in Terre Haute, Indiana produced a light curve with a period of 13.06 ± 0.03 hours and a brightness variation of 0.21 ± 0.01 in magnitude. This was refined by a 2008 study, giving a period of 13.110 ± 0.001 hours.
