= John Russell Hind =

English astronomer (1823–1895)

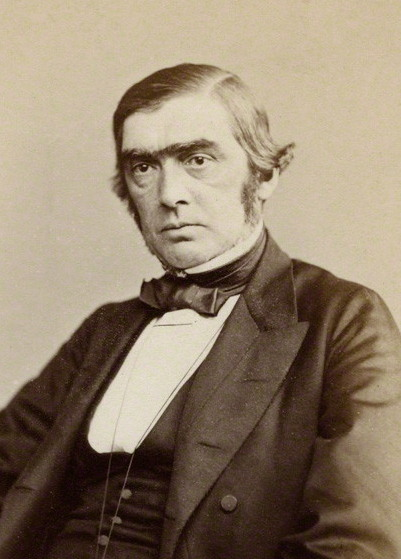
- John Russell Hind c. 1860s
- Born: 12 May 1823; Nottingham
- Died: 23 December 1895 (aged 72); Twickenham, London
- Known for: Discovery of asteroids and variable stars
- Awards: Lalande Prize (1847, 1850–1854); Gold Medal of the Royal Astronomical Society (1853); Royal Medal (1855)

John Russell Hind FRS FRSE LLD (12 May 1823 – 23 December 1895) was an English astronomer.

== Life and work ==
John Russell Hind was born in 1823 in Nottingham, the son of lace manufacturer John Hind and Elizabeth Russell, and was educated at Nottingham High School. At age 17 he went to London to serve an apprenticeship as a civil engineer, but through the help of Charles Wheatstone he left engineering to accept a position at the Royal Observatory, Greenwich under George Biddell Airy. Hind remained there from 1840 to 1844, at which time he succeeded W. R. Dawes as director of the private George Bishop's Observatory. In 1853 Hind became Superintendent of the Nautical Almanac, a position he held until 1891.

Hind is notable for being one of the early discoverers of asteroids. He also discovered and observed the variable stars R Leporis (also known as Hind's Crimson Star), U Geminorum, and T Tauri (also called Hind's Variable Nebula), and discovered the variability of μ Cephei. Hind discovered Nova Ophiuchi 1848 (V841 Ophiuchi), the first object of its type discovered since 1670.

Hind's naming of the asteroid 12 Victoria caused some controversy. At the time, asteroids were not supposed to be named after living persons. Hind somewhat disingenuously claimed that the name was not a reference to Queen Victoria, but the mythological figure Victoria.

He was elected a Fellow of the Royal Society in June 1863 and President of the Royal Astronomical Society for 1880-1882.

He died in 1895 at his home 3 Cambridge Park Gardens, Twickenham, London. Hind had married Fanny Fuller in 1846; he and his wife had six children.

Asteroids discovered: 10
| 7 Iris | 13 August 1847 | MPC |
| 8 Flora | 18 October 1847 | MPC |
| 12 Victoria | 13 September 1850 | MPC |
| 14 Irene | 19 May 1851 | MPC |
| 18 Melpomene | 24 June 1852 | MPC |
| 19 Fortuna | 22 August 1852 | MPC |
| 22 Kalliope | 16 November 1852 | MPC |
| 23 Thalia | 15 December 1852 | MPC |
| 27 Euterpe | 8 November 1853 | MPC |
| 30 Urania | 22 July 1854 | MPC |

== Honours and legacy ==
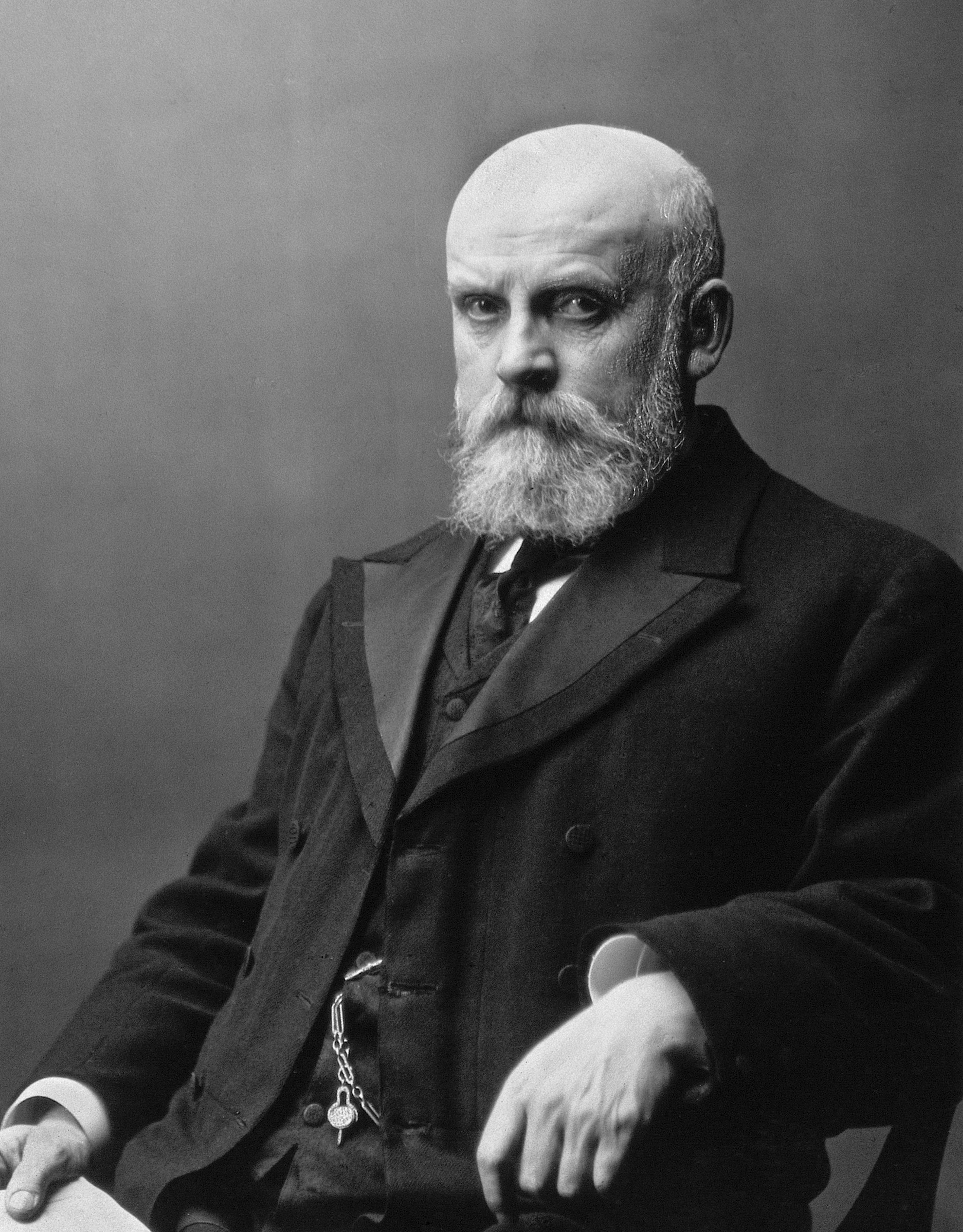
John Russell Hind

- Gold Medal of the Royal Astronomical Society (1853)
- Honorary membership of the Manchester Literary and Philosophical Society (1848)
- Fellow of the Royal Society (1863)
- The crater Hind on the Moon
- Asteroid 1897 Hind. Details: MPC
- Comets C/1847 C1 (Hind) and C/1846 O1 (de Vico–Hind).
- Hind's Crimson Star – The red-giant variable star R Leporis
- Hind's Variable Nebula – A reflection nebula in Taurus, also known as NGC 1555, associated with the young, irregular variable star T Tauri.

== Notes ==
Some sources give his name as John Russel Hind with only one "L". However, civil records and 19th-century British astronomical magazines consistently spell his name with two "L"s.

In the table of discovered asteroids, MPC links to the Minor Planet Center database for more information about the asteroid, along with the background on its name.
