= George Bishop (astronomer) =

English astronomer (1785–1861)

George Bishop, photograph c.1853

George Bishop (21 August 1785, in Leicester – 14 June 1861), was an English astronomer of the nineteenth century.

== Early life and fortune ==
At the age of eighteen, Bishop entered a British wine-making business in London and later became its proprietor. During his tenure, the business was so successful that its excise returns were said to represent half of all home-made wines in the country. Bishop's scientific career began with his admission to the Royal Astronomical Society in 1830, funded by the money he had earned from the wine business. He took lessons in algebra from Augustus De Morgan with the aim of reading Pierre-Simon Laplace's five-volume work, Mécanique Céleste (Celestial Mechanics). By the age of fifty, he had achieved sufficient mathematical knowledge to comprehend the scope of its methods.

== Career in astronomy ==
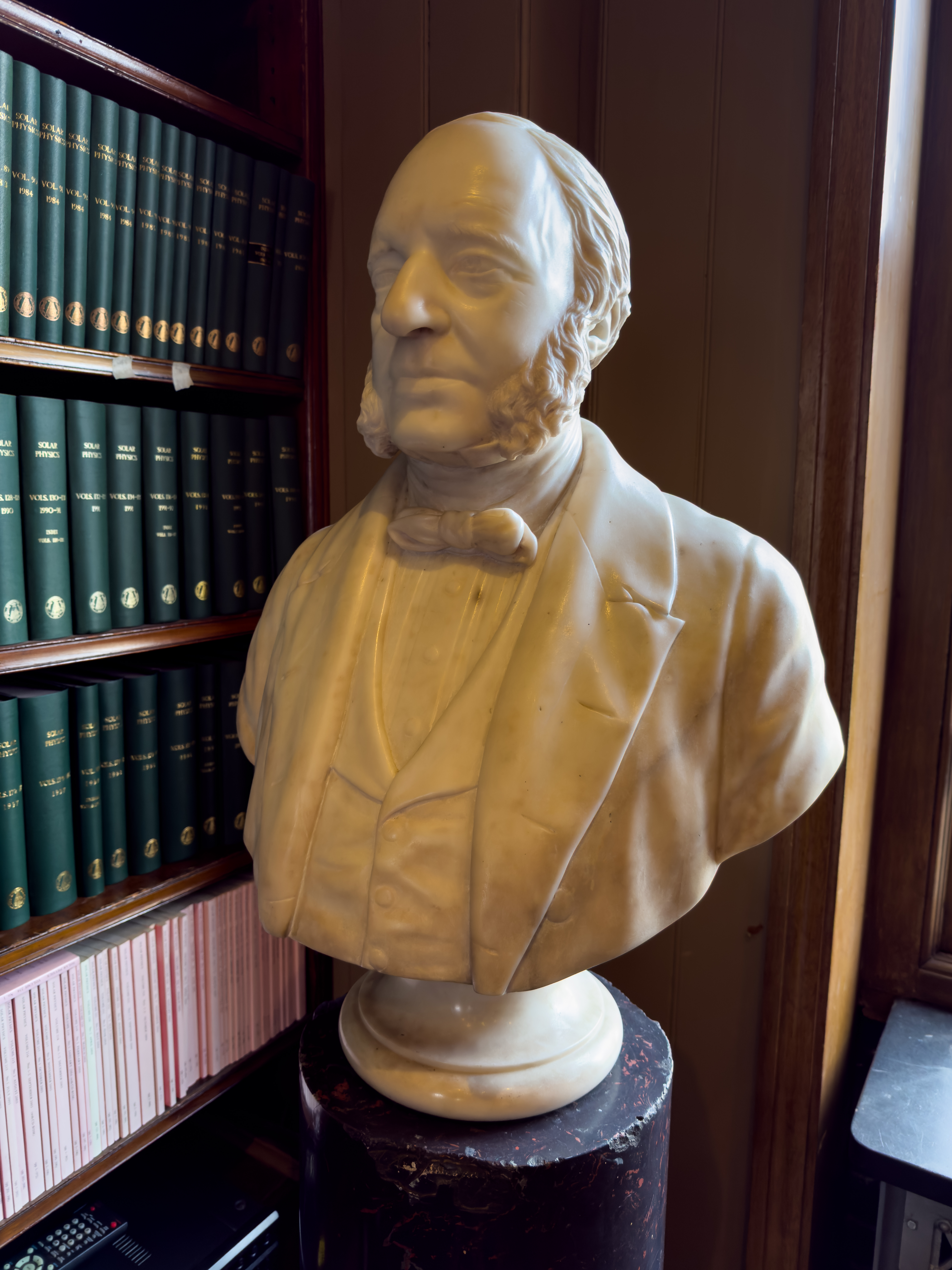
Bust at the Royal Astronomical Society

In 1836, Bishop was able to realise a long-held ambition by erecting an astronomical observatory near his residence at the South Villa of Regent's Park. He spared no expense to ensure that it would be of practical use. "I am determined," he said when choosing its site, "that this observatory shall do something."

A testimonial was awarded to Bishop by the Royal Astronomical Society in 1848 "for the foundation of an observatory leading to various astronomical discoveries" and presented to him with a warmly commendatory address by Sir John Herschel.

He acted as secretary to the society from 1833 to 1839 and as treasurer from 1840 to 1857. He was elected president in both 1857 and 1858, though poor health prevented him from taking the role. Bishop was elected a Fellow of the Royal Society on 9 June 1848. He was also a Fellow of the Royal Society of Arts and served for several years on the council of University College.

After a long period of physical illness, during which he retained his mental faculties, Bishop died on 14 June 1861 at the age of 76.

== Publications ==
- Astronomical Observations taken at the Observatory, South Villa, Regent's Park, during the years 1839-51, including a catalogue of double stars observed by Dawes and Hind, with valuable "historical and descriptive notes" by the latter, observations of new planets and comets, and the temporary star discovered by Hind in Ophiuchus on 27 April 1848, and a description of the observatory; London: Taylor, Walton and Maberly, 1852.
