= Alchemical Symbols (Unicode block) =

- Range: U+1F700..U+1F77F (128 code points)
- Plane: SMP
- Scripts: Common
- Assigned: 128 code points
- Unused: 0 reserved code points

Unicode Version History
- 6.0 (2010): 116 (+116)
- 15.0 (2022): 124 (+8)
- 17.0 (2025): 128 (+4)

Unicode documentation
- Code chart ∣ Web page

Alchemical Symbols is a Unicode block containing symbols for chemicals and substances used in ancient and medieval alchemy texts. Many of the symbols are duplicates or redundant with previous characters.

Few fonts support more than a few characters in this block as of 2021. One that does and is free for personal use is Symbola 14.0.

== Block ==
Alchemical Symbols^{[1]} Official Unicode Consortium code chart (PDF)
	0	1	2	3	4	5	6	7	8	9	A	B	C	D	E	F
U+1F70x	🜀	🜁	🜂	🜃	🜄	🜅	🜆	🜇	🜈	🜉	🜊	🜋	🜌	🜍	🜎	🜏
U+1F71x	🜐	🜑	🜒	🜓	🜔	🜕	🜖	🜗	🜘	🜙	🜚	🜛	🜜	🜝	🜞	🜟
U+1F72x	🜠	🜡	🜢	🜣	🜤	🜥	🜦	🜧	🜨	🜩	🜪	🜫	🜬	🜭	🜮	🜯
U+1F73x	🜰	🜱	🜲	🜳	🜴	🜵	🜶	🜷	🜸	🜹	🜺	🜻	🜼	🜽	🜾	🜿
U+1F74x	🝀	🝁	🝂	🝃	🝄	🝅	🝆	🝇	🝈	🝉	🝊	🝋	🝌	🝍	🝎	🝏
U+1F75x	🝐	🝑	🝒	🝓	🝔	🝕	🝖	🝗	🝘	🝙	🝚	🝛	🝜	🝝	🝞	🝟
U+1F76x	🝠	🝡	🝢	🝣	🝤	🝥	🝦	🝧	🝨	🝩	🝪	🝫	🝬	🝭	🝮	🝯
U+1F77x	🝰	🝱	🝲	🝳	🝴	🝵	🝶	🝷	🝸	🝹	🝺	🝻	🝼	🝽	🝾	🝿
Notes 1.As of Unicode version 18.0

== History ==
The following Unicode-related documents record the purpose and process of defining specific characters in the Alchemical Symbols block:

Version	Final code points (Note: Proposed code points and characters names may differ from final code points and names)	Count	L2 ID	WG2 ID	Document
6.0	U+1F700..1F773	116	L2/06-360		Lopez, Tamara (2006-10-30), Proposal on Newton Symbols
6.0	U+1F700..1F773	116	L2/07-422		Kass, James (2007-12-25), A preliminary collection of alchemical symbols
6.0	U+1F700..1F773	116	L2/08-313		Newman, William R.; Walsh, John A.; Kowalczyk, Stacy; Hooper, Wallace E. (2008-08-12), Toward a Proposal for an Alchemy Unicode Plane
6.0	U+1F700..1F773	116	L2/08-390		Newman, William R.; Walsh, John A.; Kowalczyk, Stacy; Hooper, Wallace E. (2008-10-27), Proposal for Alchemy Symbols in Unicode
6.0	U+1F700..1F773	116	L2/09-003R		Moore, Lisa (2009-02-12), "B.15.14", UTC #118 / L2 #215 Minutes
6.0	U+1F700..1F773	116	L2/09-037R2	N3584	Newman, William R.; Walsh, John A.; Kowalczyk, Stacy; Hooper, Wallace E. (2009-03-06), Proposal for Alchemical Symbols in Unicode
6.0	U+1F700..1F773	116	L2/09-234	N3603 (pdf, doc)	Umamaheswaran, V. S. (2009-07-08), "M54.10", Unconfirmed minutes of WG 2 meeting 54
6.0	U+1F700..1F773	116	L2/09-412	N3722	Suignard, Michel (2009-10-26), Disposition of comments on SC2 N 4078 (PDAM text for Amendment 8 to ISO/IEC 10646:2003)
6.0	U+1F700..1F773	116	L2/09-395		Whistler, Ken (2009-10-29), "Name Changes for Alchemical Symbols", WG2 Consent Docket
6.0	U+1F700..1F773	116	L2/09-335R		Moore, Lisa (2009-11-10), "Consensus 121-C17", UTC #121 / L2 #218 Minutes
6.0	U+1F700..1F773	116	L2/10-119	N3813	Parker, Robert; et al. (2010-03-21), Comments on spelling SULPHUR vs SULFUR in FPDAM 8
6.0	U+1F700..1F773	116	L2/10-128	N3818	Hooper, Wallace E.; et al. (2010-03-29), Further Comments on the spelling SULPHUR vs SULFUR in FPDAM 8
6.0	U+1F700..1F773	116	L2/10-137	N3828	Suignard, Michel (2010-04-22), Disposition of comments on SC2 N 4123 (FPDAM text for Amendment 8 to ISO/IEC 10646:2003)
6.0	U+1F700..1F773	116	L2/10-152		Anderson, Deborah (2010-04-28), Brief report from WG2 Meeting #56, San Jose
6.0	U+1F700..1F773	116	L2/23-083		Anderson, Deborah; Kučera, Jan; Whistler, Ken; Pournader, Roozbeh; Constable, Peter (2023-04-21), "5 Alchemical Symbols", Recommendations to UTC #175 April 2023 on Script Proposals
6.0	U+1F700..1F773	116	L2/23-069R3		Miller, Kirk (2023-04-28), Revised designs of the alchemical symbols block [Affects U+1F741, 1F747, 1F74C, 1F74F, 1F756, 1F758, 1F763, 1F768, 1F76D, and 1F76E]
6.0	U+1F700..1F773	116	L2/23-076		Constable, Peter (2023-05-01), "Consensus 175-C17", UTC #175 Minutes, "Accept the glyph changes for the Alchemical Symbols block"
15.0	U+1F774..1F776	3	L2/22-005		Miller, Kirk (2021-12-23), Unicode request for Lot of Fortune and eclipse symbols
15.0	U+1F774..1F776	3	L2/22-023		Anderson, Deborah; Whistler, Ken; Pournader, Roozbeh; Constable, Peter (2022-01-22), "18. Lot of Fortune and Eclipse Symbols", Recommendations to UTC #170 January 2022 on Script Proposals
15.0	U+1F774..1F776	3	L2/22-016		Constable, Peter (2022-04-21), "Consensus 170-C11", UTC #170 Minutes
15.0	U+1F77B..1F77F	5	L2/21-224		Miller, Kirk (2021-10-26), Unicode request for dwarf-planet symbols
15.0	U+1F77B..1F77F	5	L2/22-023		Anderson, Deborah; Whistler, Ken; Pournader, Roozbeh; Constable, Peter (2022-01-22), "16. Dwarf Planet Symbols", Recommendations to UTC #170 January 2022 on Script Proposals
15.0	U+1F77B..1F77F	5	L2/22-016		Constable, Peter (2022-04-21), "Consensus 170-C10", UTC #170 Minutes
17.0	U+1F777..1F77A	4	L2/23-207		Bala, Gavin Jared; Miller, Kirk (2023-09-18), Unicode request for historical asteroid symbols
17.0	U+1F777..1F77A	4	L2/23-238R		Anderson, Deborah; Kučera, Jan; Whistler, Ken; Pournader, Roozbeh; Constable, Peter (2023-11-01), "11 Symbols: Asteroid symbols", Recommendations to UTC #177 November 2023 on Script Proposals
17.0	U+1F777..1F77A	4	L2/23-231		Constable, Peter (2023-12-08), "Section 11", UTC #177 Minutes
