= Alchemical symbol =

Symbols used in pre-19th-century chemistry

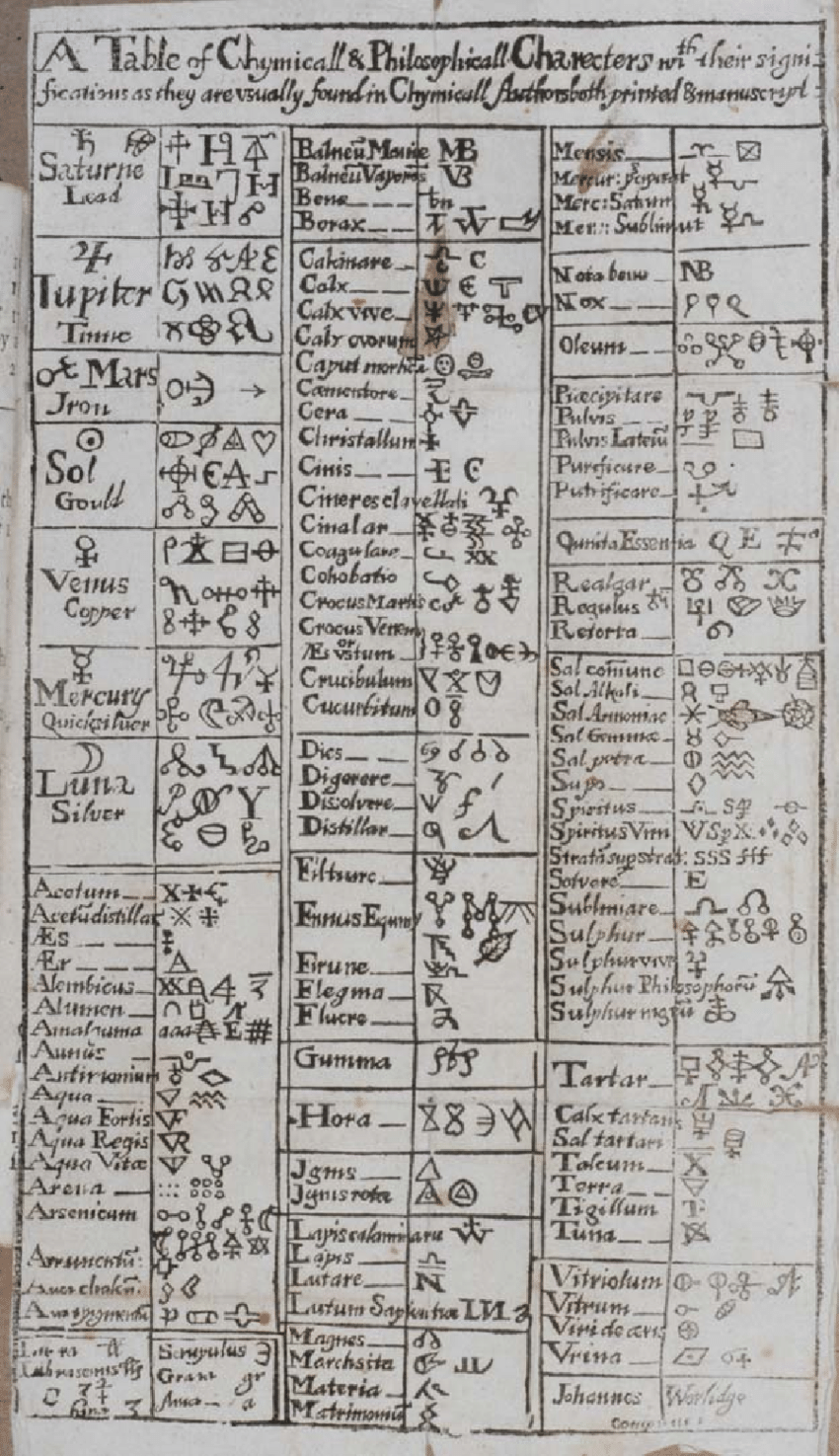
A table of alchemical symbols from Basil Valentine's The Last Will and Testament, 1670

Part 1	Part 2
Alchemical symbols before Lavoisier

Alchemical symbols were used to denote chemical elements and compounds, as well as alchemical apparatus and processes, until the 18th century. Although notation was partly standardized, style and symbol varied between alchemists. Lüdy-Tenger published an inventory of 3,695 symbols and variants, and that was not exhaustive, omitting for example many of the symbols used by Isaac Newton. This page therefore lists only the most common symbols.

== Three primes ==
According to Paracelsus (1493–1541), the three primes or tria prima – of which material substances are immediately composed – are:

- Sulfur or soul, the principle of combustibility: 🜍
- Mercury or spirit, the principle of fusibility and volatility: ☿
- Salt or body, the principle of non-combustibility and non-volatility: 🜔

== Four basic elements ==
Western alchemy makes use of the four classical elements. The symbols used for these are:

- Air 🜁
- Earth 🜃
- Fire 🜂
- Water 🜄

== Seven planetary metals ==
The shield in the coat of arms of the Royal Society of Chemistry, with the seven planetary-metal symbols

The seven metals known since Classical times in Europe were associated with the seven classical planets; this figured heavily in alchemical symbolism. The exact correlation varied over time, and in early centuries bronze or electrum were sometimes found instead of mercury, or copper for Mars instead of iron; however, gold, silver, and lead had always been associated with the Sun, Moon, and Saturn. (Note: For example, Mercury was tin and Jupiter was electrum in the Marcianus manuscript attributed to Zosimos of Panopolis.) The associations below are attested from the 7th century and had stabilized by the 15th. They started breaking down with the discovery of antimony, bismuth, and zinc in the 16th century. Alchemists would typically call the metals by their planetary names, e.g. "Saturn" for lead, "Mars" for iron; compounds of tin, iron, and silver continued to be called "jovial", "martial", and "lunar"; or "of Jupiter", "of Mars", and "of the moon", through the 17th century. The tradition remains today with the name of the element mercury, where chemists decided the planetary name was preferable to common names like "quicksilver", and in a few archaic terms such as lunar caustic (silver nitrate) and saturnism (lead poisoning).

- Silver, corresponding with the Moon ☽ or ☾ ( or) [also 🜛 in Newton]
- Gold, corresponding with the Sun ☉ 🜚 ☼
- Quicksilver, corresponding with Mercury ☿
- Copper, corresponding with Venus ♀
- Iron, corresponding with Mars ♂
- Tin, corresponding with Jupiter ♃
- Lead, corresponding with Saturn ♄

== Mundane elements and later metals ==
The squared circle: an alchemical symbol (17th century) illustrating the interplay of the four elements of matter symbolising the philosopher's stone

- Antimony ♁ (in Newton), also
- Arsenic 🜺
- Bismuth ♆ (in Newton), 🜘 (in Bergman)
- Cobalt (approximately 🜶) (in Bergman)
- Manganese (in Bergman)
- Nickel (in Bergman; previously used for regulus of sulfur)
- Oxygen (in Lavoisier)
- Phlogiston (in Bergman)
- Phosphorus or
- Platinum or (in Bergman et al.)
- Sulfur 🜍 (in Newton)
- Zinc (in Bergman)

== Alchemical compounds ==
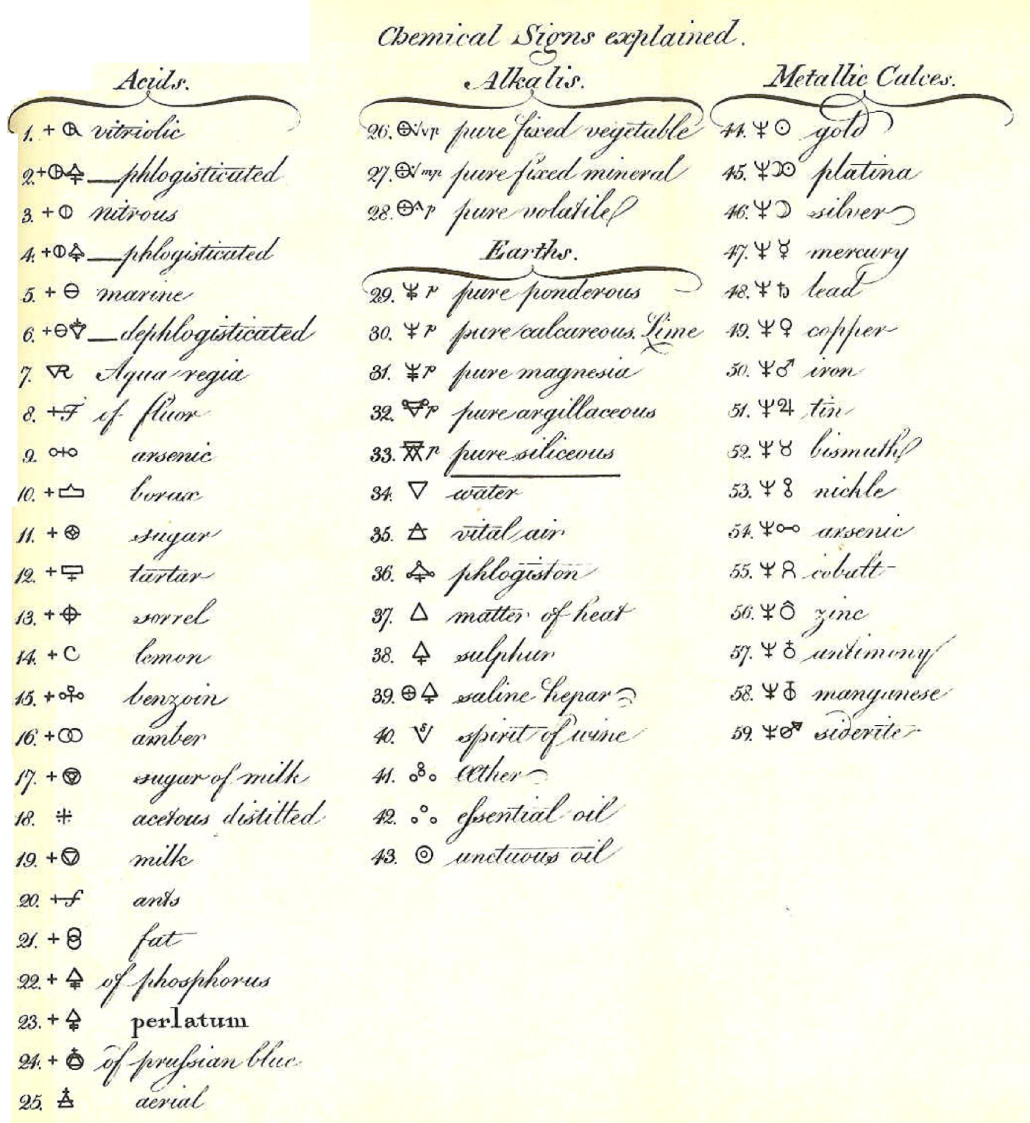
Alchemical symbols in Torbern Bergman's 1775 Dissertation on Elective Affinities

The following symbols, among others, have been adopted into Unicode.

- Acid (incl. vinegar) 🜊
- Sal ammoniac (ammonium chloride) 🜹
- Aqua fortis (nitric acid) 🜅, A.F.
- Aqua regia (nitro-hydrochloric acid) 🜆, 🜇, A.R.
- Spirit of wine (concentrated ethanol; called aqua vitae or spiritus vini) 🜈, S.V. or 🜉
- Amalgam (alloys of a metal and mercury) 🝛 = a͞a͞a, ȧȧȧ (among other abbreviations).
- Cinnabar (mercury sulfide) 🜓
- Vinegar (distilled) 🜋 (in Newton)
- Niter 🜕
- Vitriol (sulfates) 🜖
- Black sulphur (residue from sublimation of sulfur) 🜏

== Alchemical processes ==
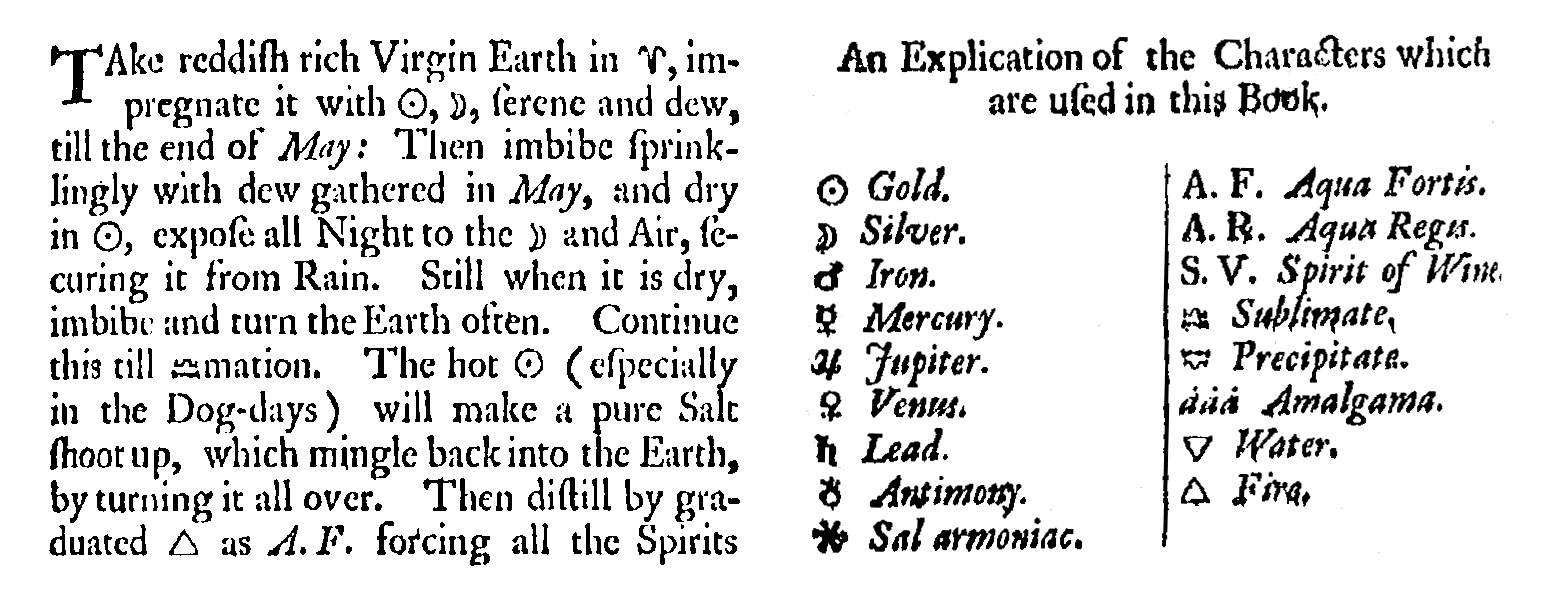
An extract and symbol key from Kenelm Digby's A Choice Collection of Rare Secrets, 1682

The alchemical magnum opus was sometimes expressed as a series of chemical operations. In cases where these numbered twelve, each could be assigned one of the Zodiac signs as a form of cryptography. The following example can be found in Pernety's Dictionnaire mytho-hermétique (1758):

1. Calcination (Aries) ♈︎
2. Congelation (Taurus) ♉︎
3. Fixation (Gemini) ♊︎ (Solidification)
4. Solution (Cancer) ♋︎
5. Digestion (Leo) ♌︎
6. Distillation (Virgo) ♍︎
7. Sublimation (Libra) ♎︎
8. Separation (Scorpio) ♏︎
9. Ceration (Sagittarius) ♐︎
10. Fermentation (Capricorn) ♑︎ (Putrefaction)
11. Multiplication (Aquarius) ♒︎
12. Projection (Pisces) ♓︎

== Units ==
Several symbols indicate units of time.

- Month 🝱 or or xXx
- Day-Night 🝰
- Hour 🝮

== Unicode ==
The Alchemical Symbols block was added to Unicode in 2010 as part of Unicode 6.0.

Alchemical Symbols^{[1]} Official Unicode Consortium code chart (PDF)
	0	1	2	3	4	5	6	7	8	9	A	B	C	D	E	F
U+1F70x	🜀	🜁	🜂	🜃	🜄	🜅	🜆	🜇	🜈	🜉	🜊	🜋	🜌	🜍	🜎	🜏
U+1F71x	🜐	🜑	🜒	🜓	🜔	🜕	🜖	🜗	🜘	🜙	🜚	🜛	🜜	🜝	🜞	🜟
U+1F72x	🜠	🜡	🜢	🜣	🜤	🜥	🜦	🜧	🜨	🜩	🜪	🜫	🜬	🜭	🜮	🜯
U+1F73x	🜰	🜱	🜲	🜳	🜴	🜵	🜶	🜷	🜸	🜹	🜺	🜻	🜼	🜽	🜾	🜿
U+1F74x	🝀	🝁	🝂	🝃	🝄	🝅	🝆	🝇	🝈	🝉	🝊	🝋	🝌	🝍	🝎	🝏
U+1F75x	🝐	🝑	🝒	🝓	🝔	🝕	🝖	🝗	🝘	🝙	🝚	🝛	🝜	🝝	🝞	🝟
U+1F76x	🝠	🝡	🝢	🝣	🝤	🝥	🝦	🝧	🝨	🝩	🝪	🝫	🝬	🝭	🝮	🝯
U+1F77x	🝰	🝱	🝲	🝳	🝴	🝵	🝶	🝷	🝸	🝹	🝺	🝻	🝼	🝽	🝾	🝿
Notes 1.As of Unicode version 18.0

== Gallery ==
A list of symbols published in 1931:

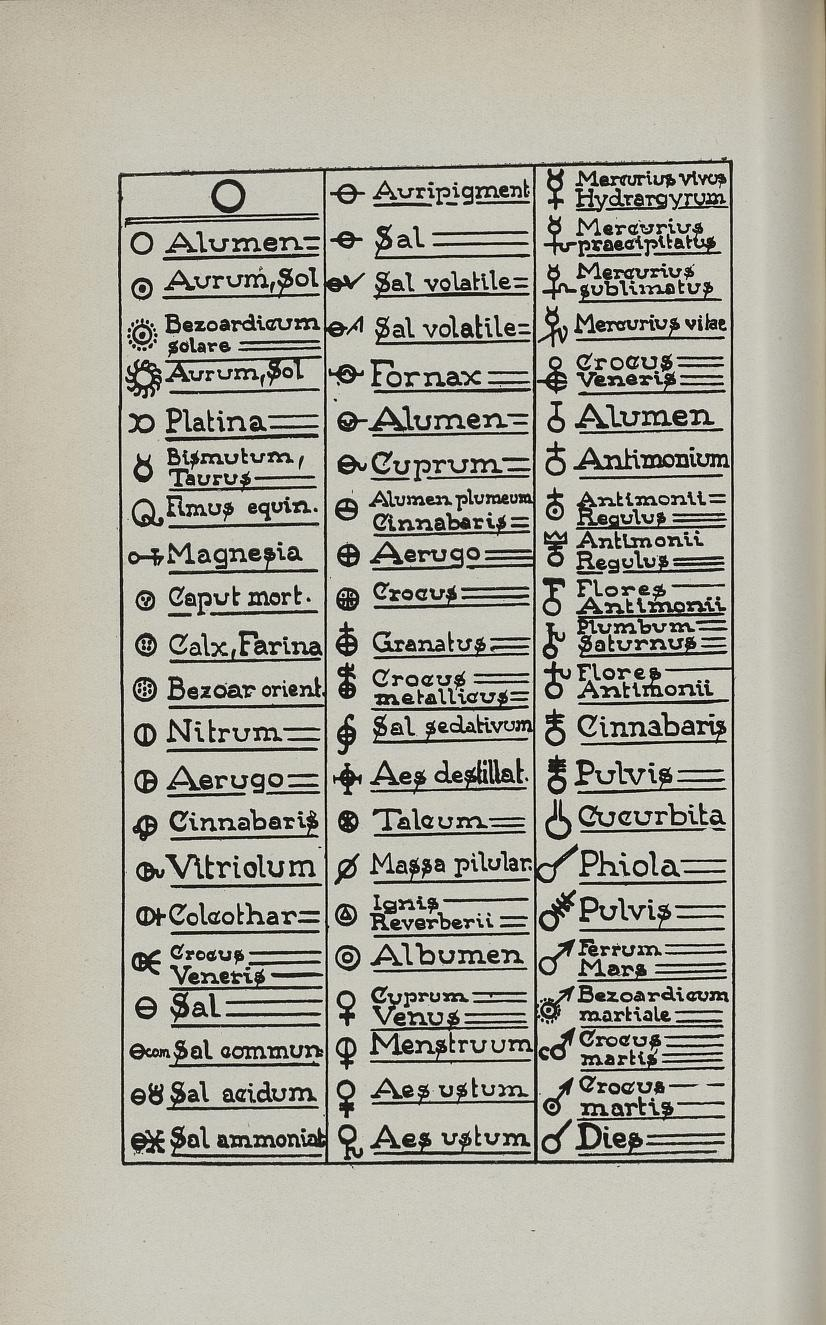

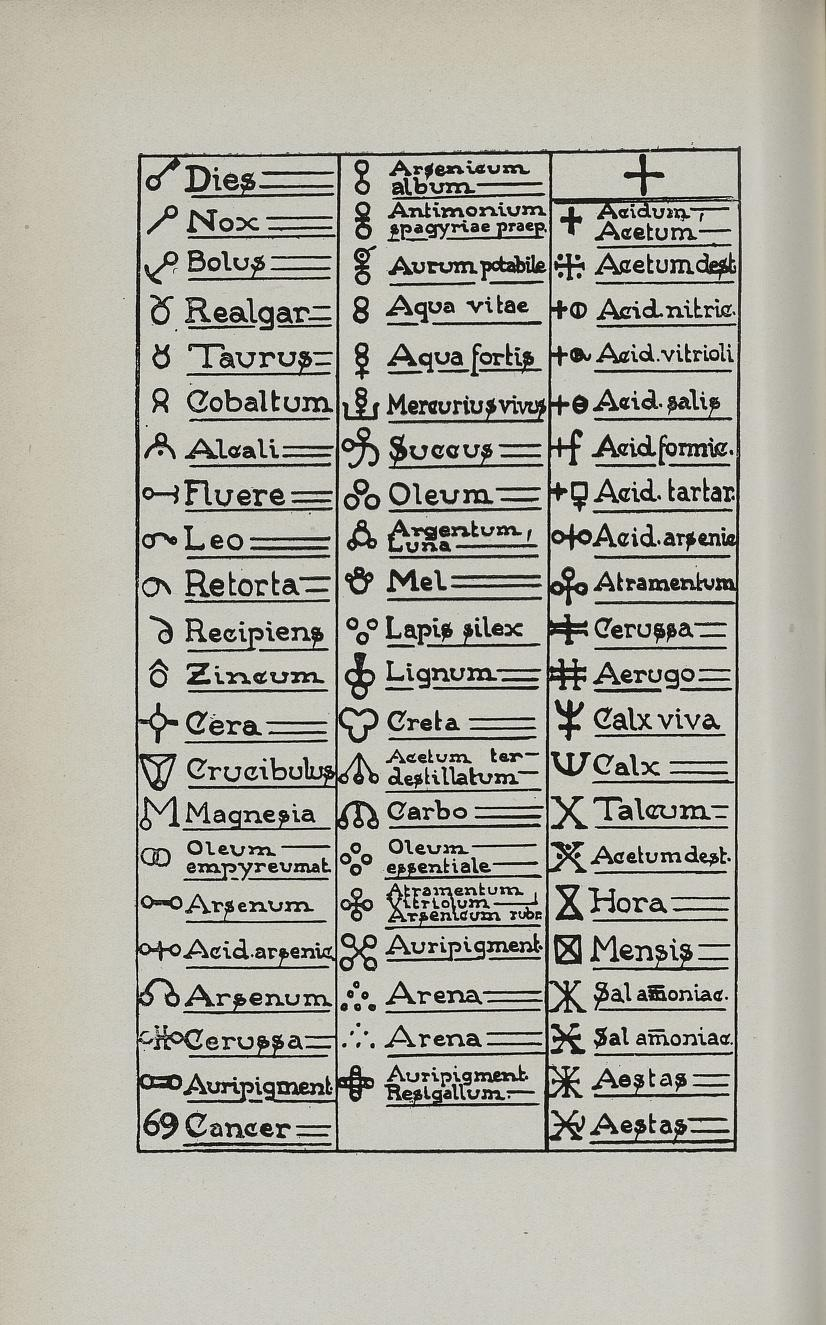

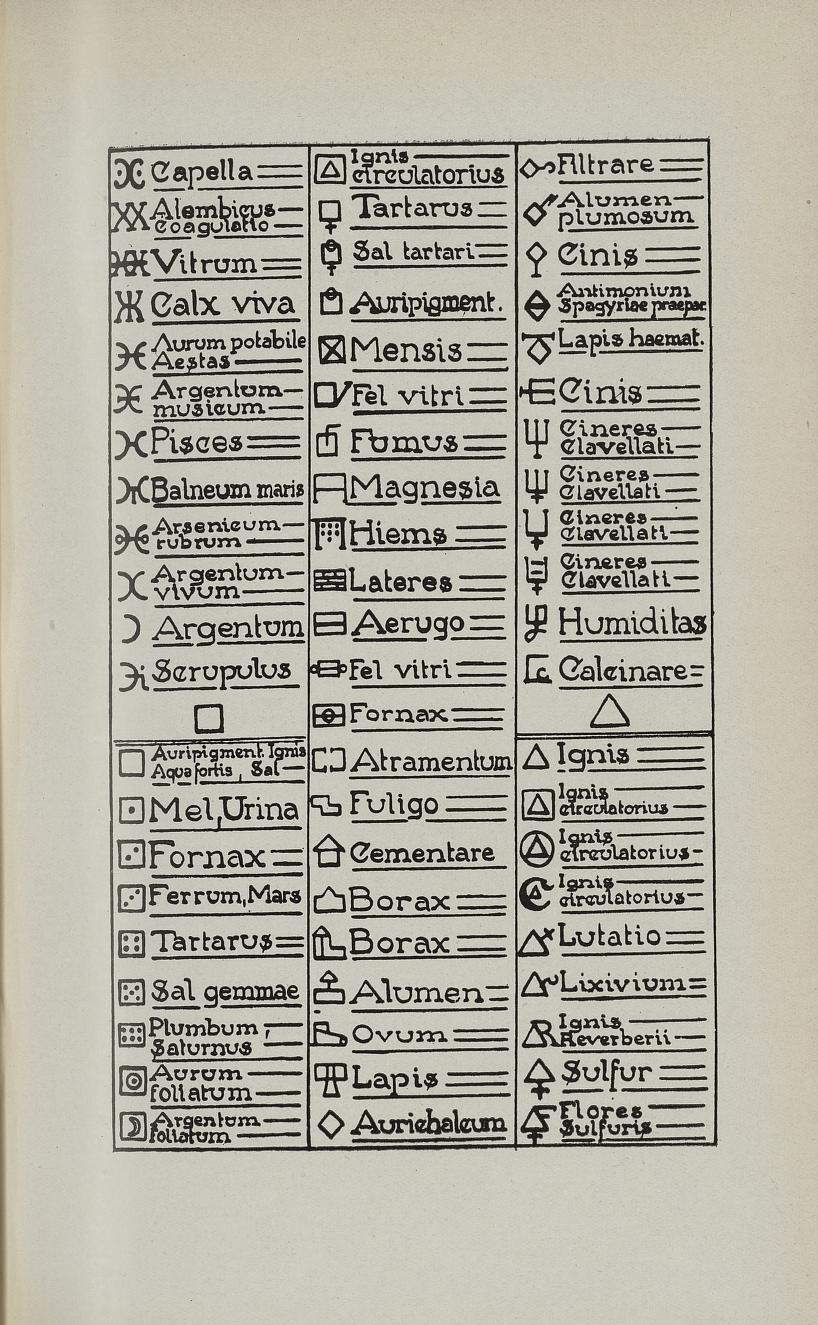

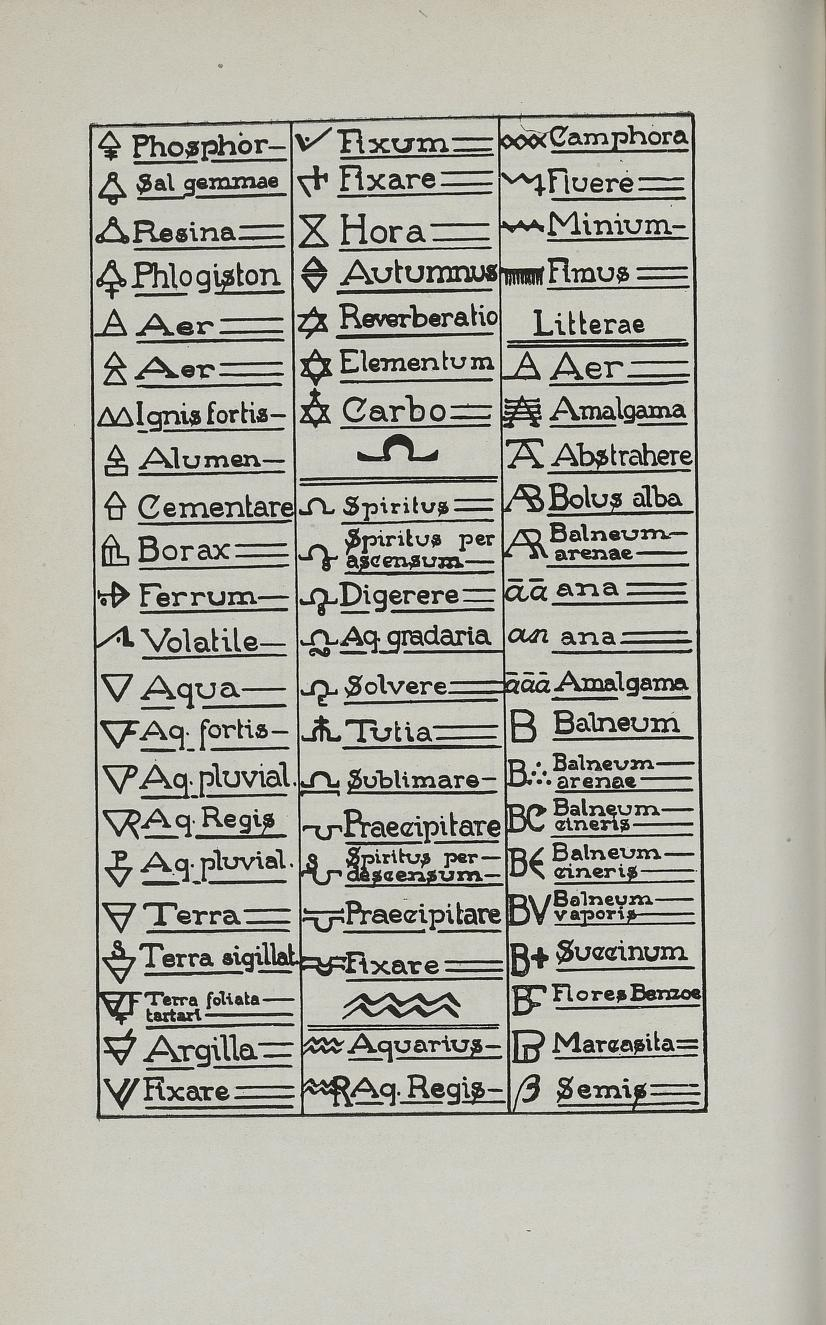

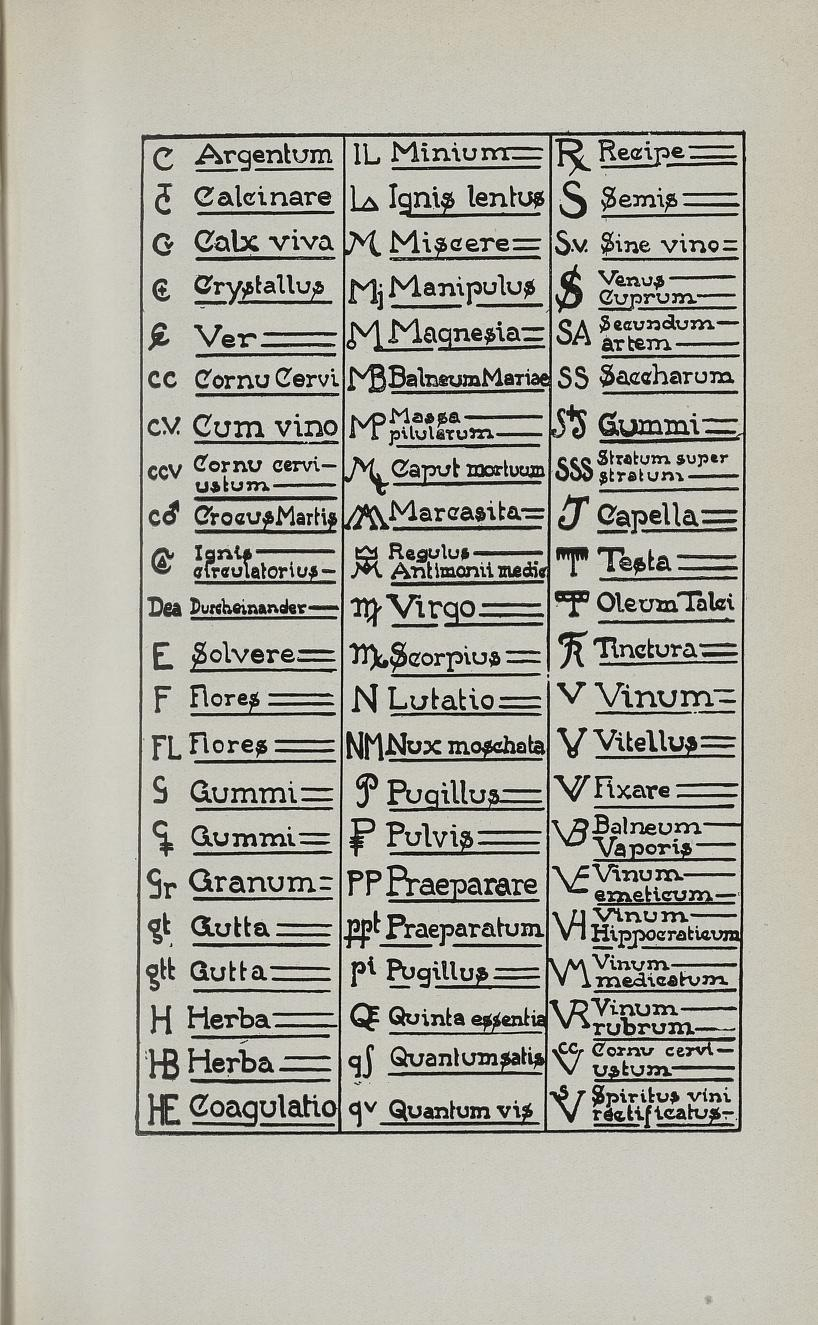

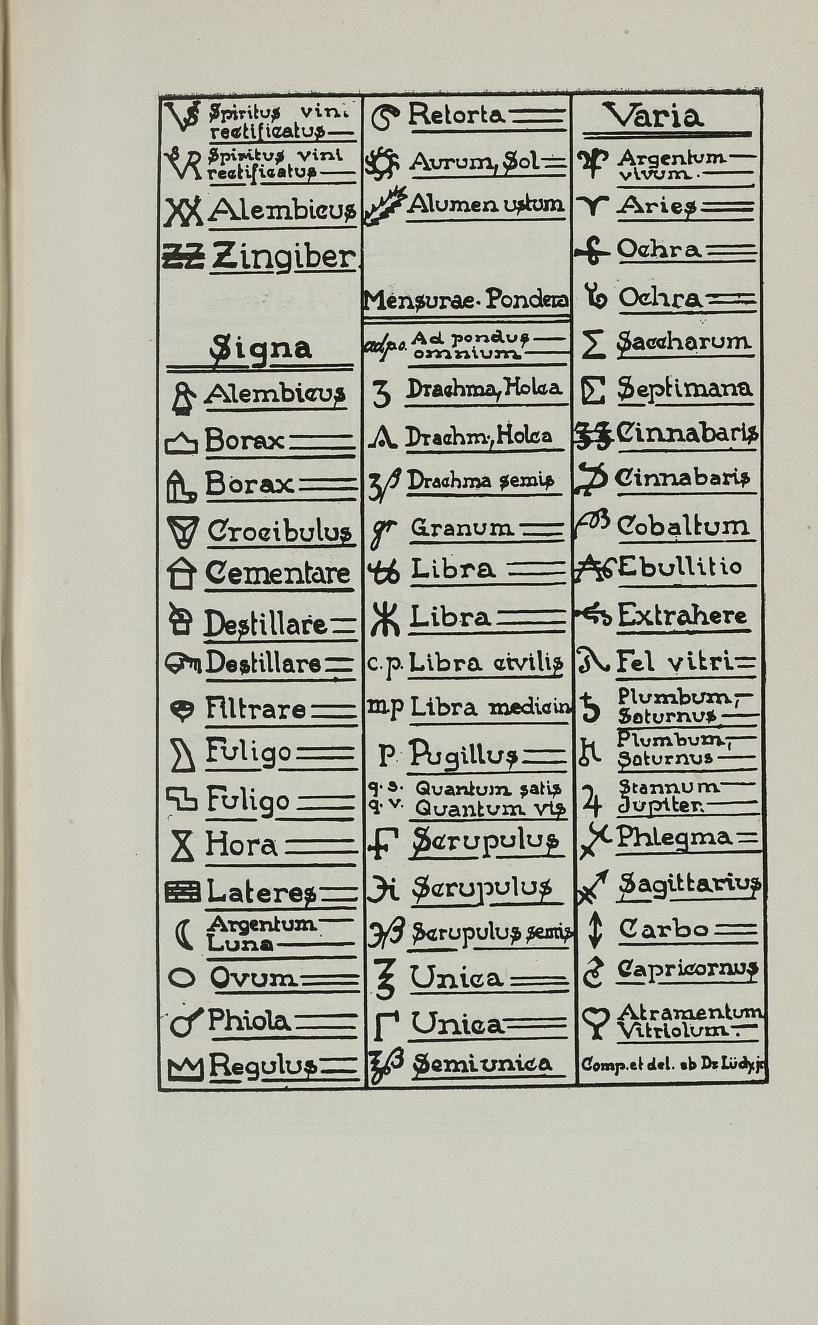

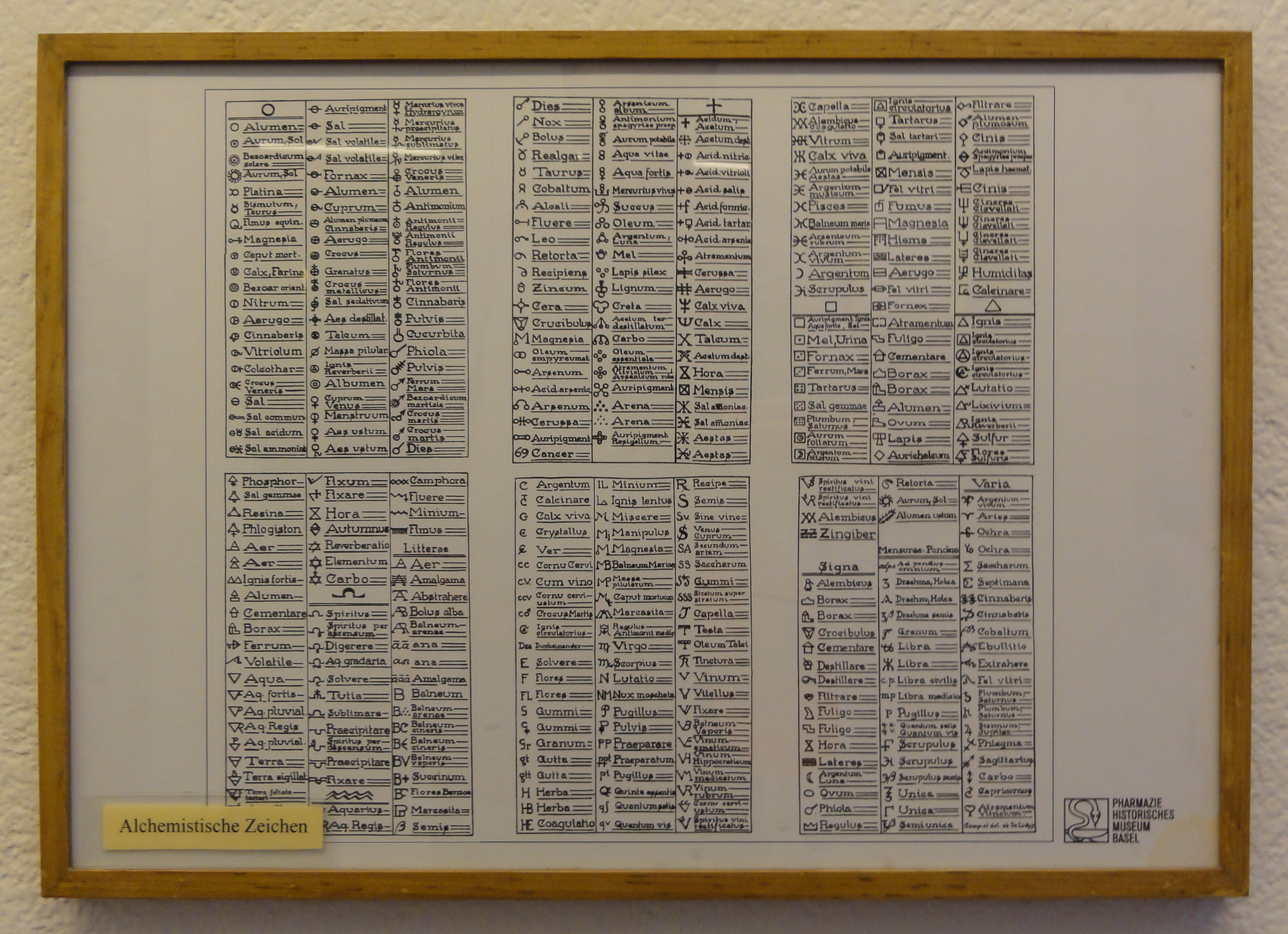
(all 6 plates, large file)

An 1888 reproduction of a Venetian list of medieval Greek alchemical symbols from about the year 1100 but circulating since about 300 and attributed to Zosimos of Panopolis. The list starts with 🜚 for gold and has early conventions that would later change: here ☿ is tin and ♃ electrum; ☾ is silver but ☽ is mercury. Many of the 'symbols' are simply abbreviations of the Greek word or phrase. View the files on Commons for the list of symbols.

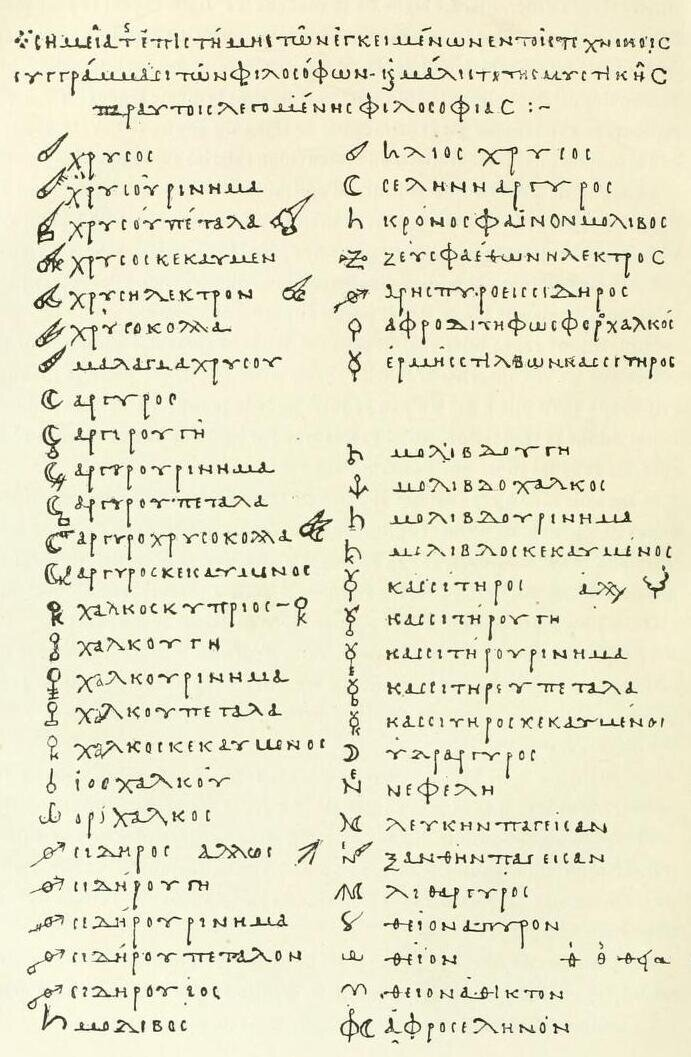

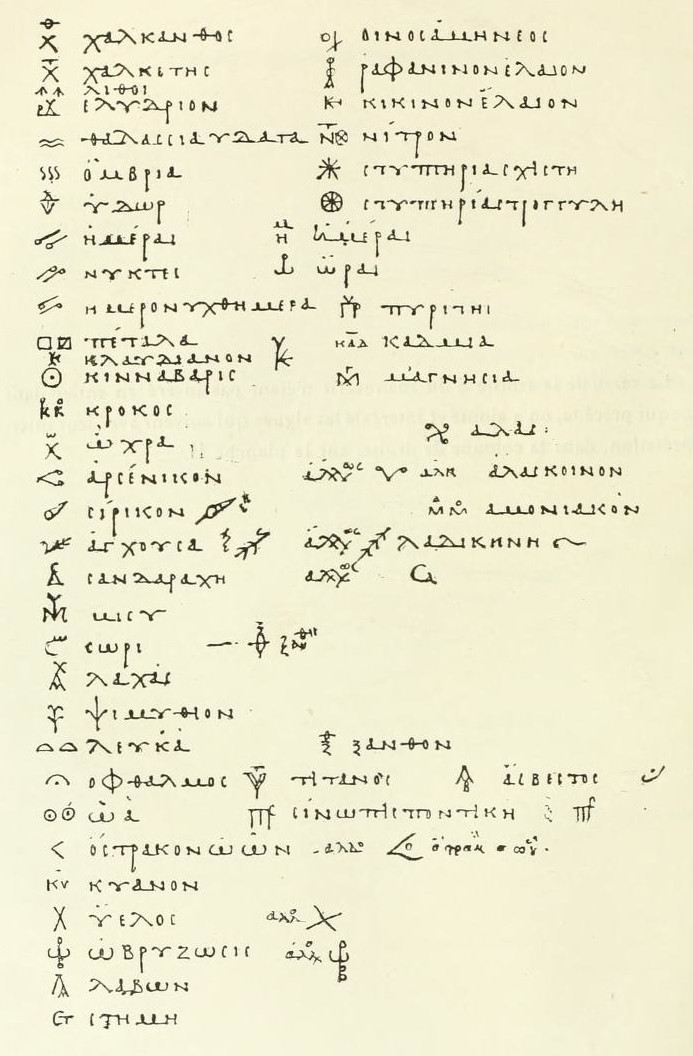

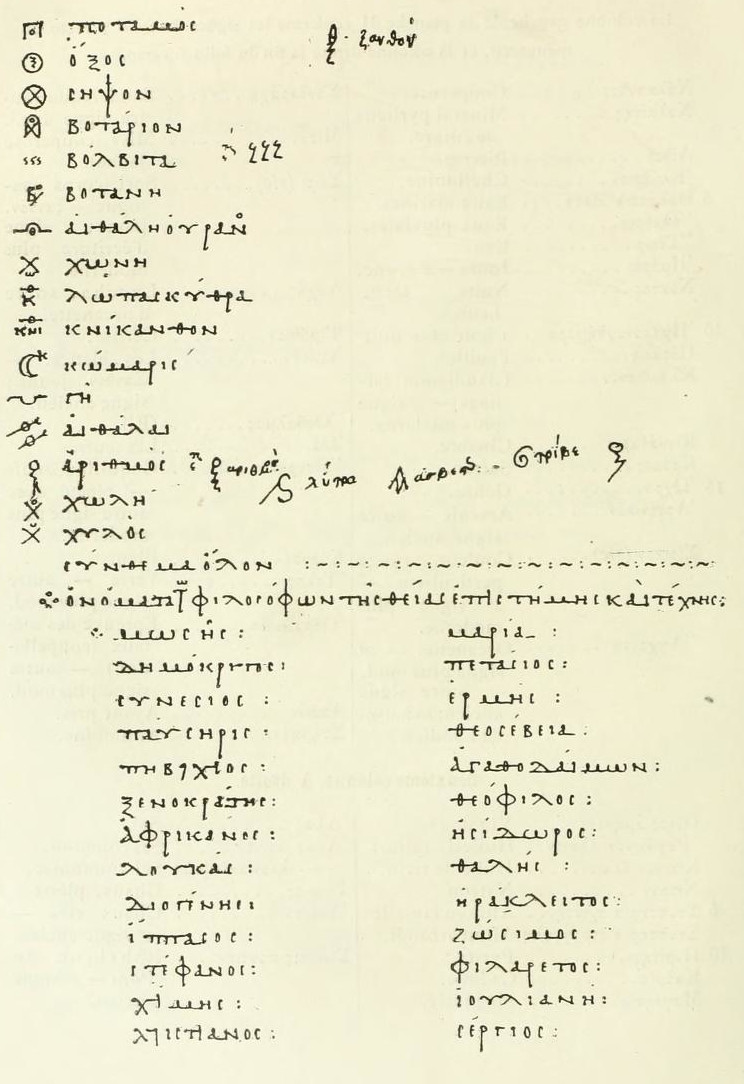

== See also ==
Other symbols commonly used in alchemy and related esoteric traditions:

- Astronomical symbols – Symbols in astronomy
  - Astrological symbols – Symbols denoting astrological concepts
  - Planet symbols – Graphical symbols used in astrology and astronomy
  - Suns in alchemy – Sun symbols have a variety of uses
    - Circled dot (disambiguation)
- Monas Hieroglyphica – 1564 book by John Dee about an esoteric symbol
- Rub el Hizb – Islamic symbol in the shape of an octagram
- Wuxing (Chinese philosophy) – Chinese five elements
- Seal of Solomon – Signet ring attributed to the Israelite king Solomon
- Rosy Cross – Western esoteric symbol
- Eye of Providence – Symbol
- Sigil – Magical symbol, as used by Hermetic theurgists
  - Sigillum Dei – Seal of God, or Seal of Truth, according to John Dee
