= Ammineite =

Minerals that contains ammine groups

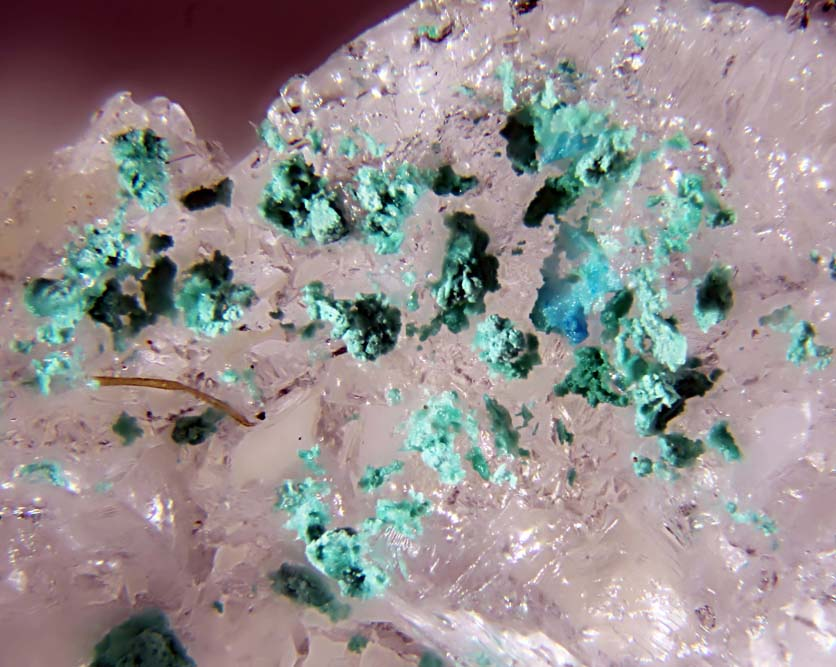
- Sky blue ammineite crystals (a mineral with amine groups, IMA 2008-032) in a matrix of halite. From: Pabellon de Pica, Chanabaya, Iquique Province, Tarapacá Region, Chile.

General
- Category: Chloride mineral
- Formula: CuCl_{2}(NH_{3})_{2}
- IMA symbol: Amm
- Crystal system: Orthorhombic
- Crystal class: Dipyramidal (mmm); H-M symbol: (2/m 2/m 2/m)
- Space group: Cmcm
- Unit cell: a = 7.79, b = 10.64 c = 5.84 [Å] (approximated)

Identification
- Color: Blue
- Crystal habit: Hypidiomorphic crystals; powdery masses
- Mohs scale hardness: 1
- Luster: Vitreous
- Streak: Light blue
- Specific gravity: 2.38 (calculated)
- Pleochroism: Dark blue to light blue

Ammineite is the first recognized mineral containing ammine groups. Its formula is [CuCl_{2}(NH_{3})_{2}]. The mineral is chemically pure. It was found in a guano deposit in Chile. At the same site other ammine-containing minerals were later found:

- Chanabayaite, CuCl(N_{3}C_{2}H_{2})(NH_{3})·0.25H_{2}O (an alternative formula), a triazolate mineral
- Joanneumite, Cu(C_{3}N_{3}O_{3}H_{2})_{2}(NH_{3})_{2}, an isocyanurate mineral
- Shilovite, Cu(NH_{3})_{4}(NO_{3})_{2}

== Crystal structure ==
The characteristic features of the structure of ammineite are:

- layers of trans form of the copper complex, parallel to (001), connected by Cu-Cl bonds
- presence of CuN_{2}Cl_{4} distorted octahedron ([4+2] coordination)
- edge-sharing of the octahedra produce zigzag chains along the [001] direction
- hydrogen bonds between NH_{3} and Cl atoms

== Associated minerals ==
Ammineite coexists with atacamite, darapskite, halite and salammoniac.

== Origin ==
Ammineite is supposed to be a result of an interaction of an earlier copper mineral, likely from a plutonic rock, with ammonia in guano. Ammonia may be produced in decomposition of compounds like urea or uric acid.
