= Joanneumite =

Isocyanurate mineral

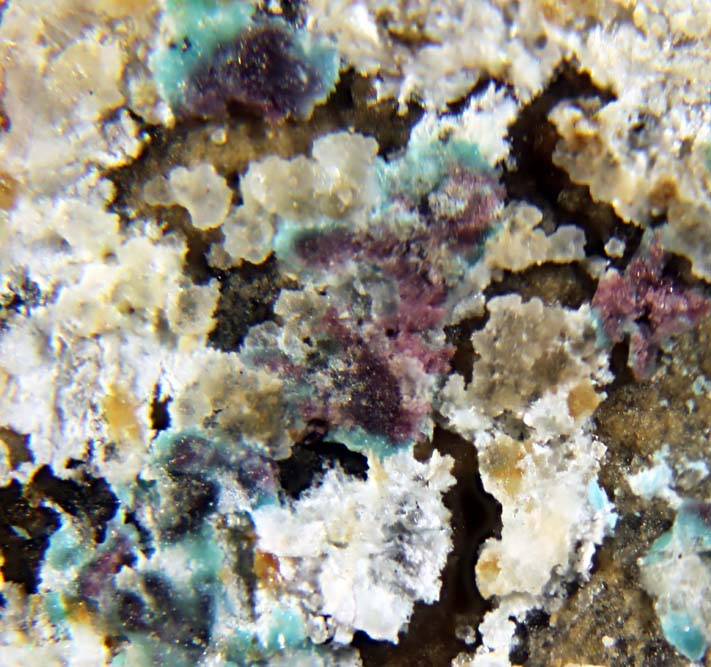
- Joanneumite (violet crystals), surrounded by salammoniac (fine-grained, blue-green mineral)

General
- Category: Organic mineral
- Formula: Cu(C_{3}N_{3}O_{3}H_{2})_{2}(NH_{3})_{2}
- IMA symbol: Joa
- Crystal system: Triclinic
- Crystal class: Pinacoidal (1̅) (same H-M symbol)
- Space group: P1̅
- Unit cell: a = 5.042, b = 6.997 c = 9.099 [Å]; α = 90.05° β = 98.11°, γ = 110.95°

Identification
- Density: 1.97-2.02 (measured)

Joanneumite, confirmed as a new mineral in 2012, is the first recognized isocyanurate mineral, with the formula Cu(C_{3}N_{3}O_{3}H_{2})_{2}(NH_{3})_{2}. Its crystal structure is identical to the structure of its synthetic analogue bis(isocyanurato)diamminecopper(II). It is an ammine-containing mineral, a feature shared with ammineite, chanabayaite and shilovite. All of these minerals are very rare and were found in a guano deposit in Pabellón de Pica, Chile.

== See also ==
- Copper(II) cyanurate
