= Ordoñezite =

Ordóñezite
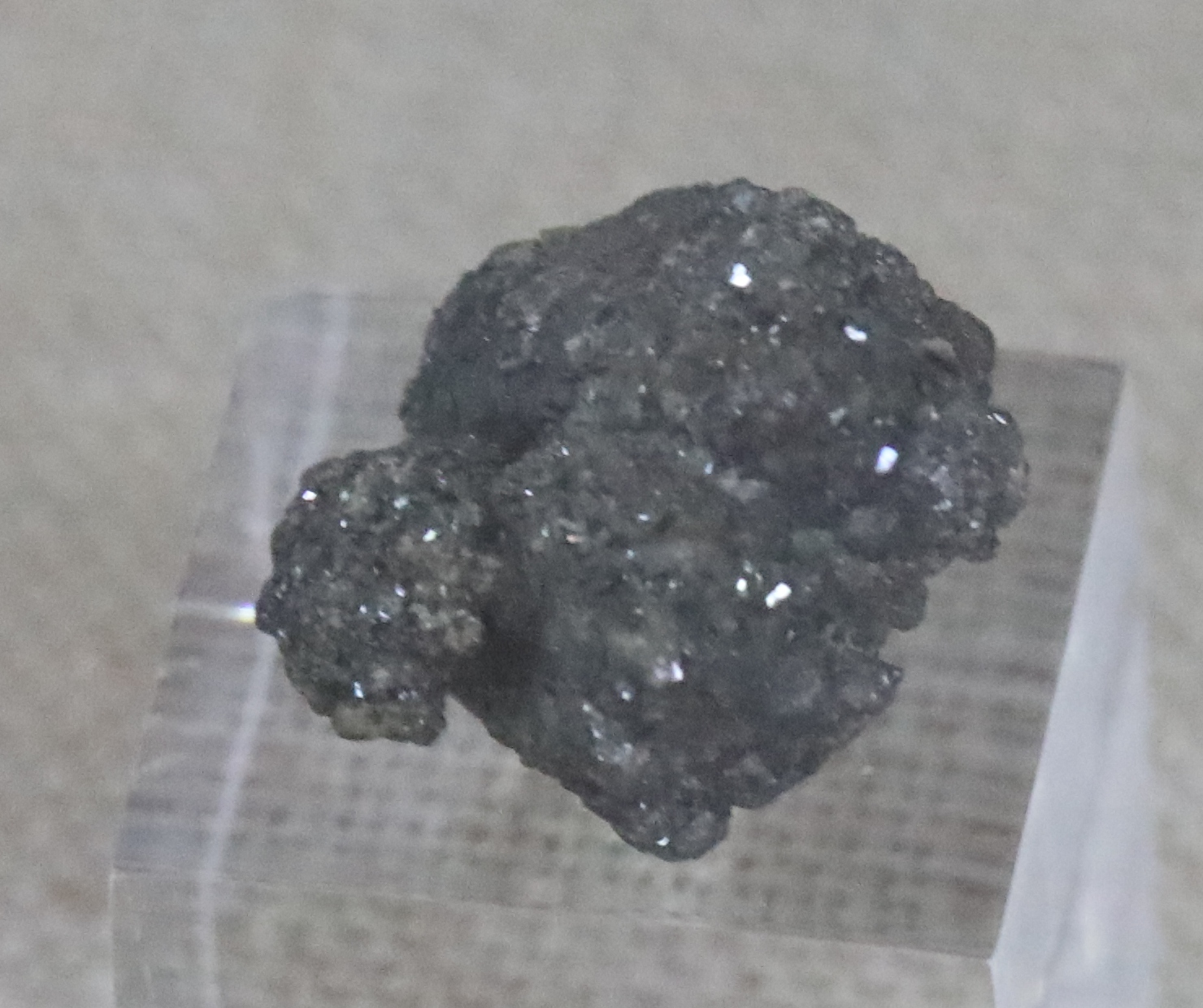

General
- Category: Antimonate mineral
- Formula: ZnSb_{2}O_{6}
- IMA symbol: Ord
- Strunz classification: 4.DB.10
- Crystal system: Tetragonal
- Crystal class: Ditetragonal dipyramidal (4/mmm); H-M symbol: (4/m 2/m 2/m)
- Space group: P4_{2}/mnm
- Unit cell: a = 4.66 Å, c = 9.26 Å; Z = 2

Identification
- Color: Very light to very dark brown, colorless to pearl-gray, light yellowish olive to dark olive
- Crystal habit: Pyramidal crystals in drusy or stalactitic masses
- Twinning: Common on {013}
- Fracture: Conchoidal
- Mohs scale hardness: 6.5
- Luster: Adamantine
- Diaphaneity: Semitransparent
- Specific gravity: 6.635
- Optical properties: Uniaxial (+)
- Refractive index: N(calculated) = 2.02 - 2.04

Ordoñezite or ordóñezite is a rare tetragonal zinc antimonate mineral with chemical formula: ZnSb_{2}O_{6}.

== Discovery ==
Ordóñezite was first discovered and documented by Ezequiel Ordóñez (1867–1950), a Mexican geologist, formerly director of the Geological Institute of Mexico. It was first described in 1953 for an occurrence with cassiterite in veins in rhyolite in the Santín mine which is located about eight kilometres from Santa Catarina, Guanajuato, Mexico. Another locality is El Antimonio, 27 km (17 mi) southwest of Agua Prieta, Sonora, Mexico.

== Properties ==
Optical properties include: semitransparent, very light to very dark colorless to pearl-gray, light yellowish olive to dark olive.
