= Bismuth(III) sulfate =

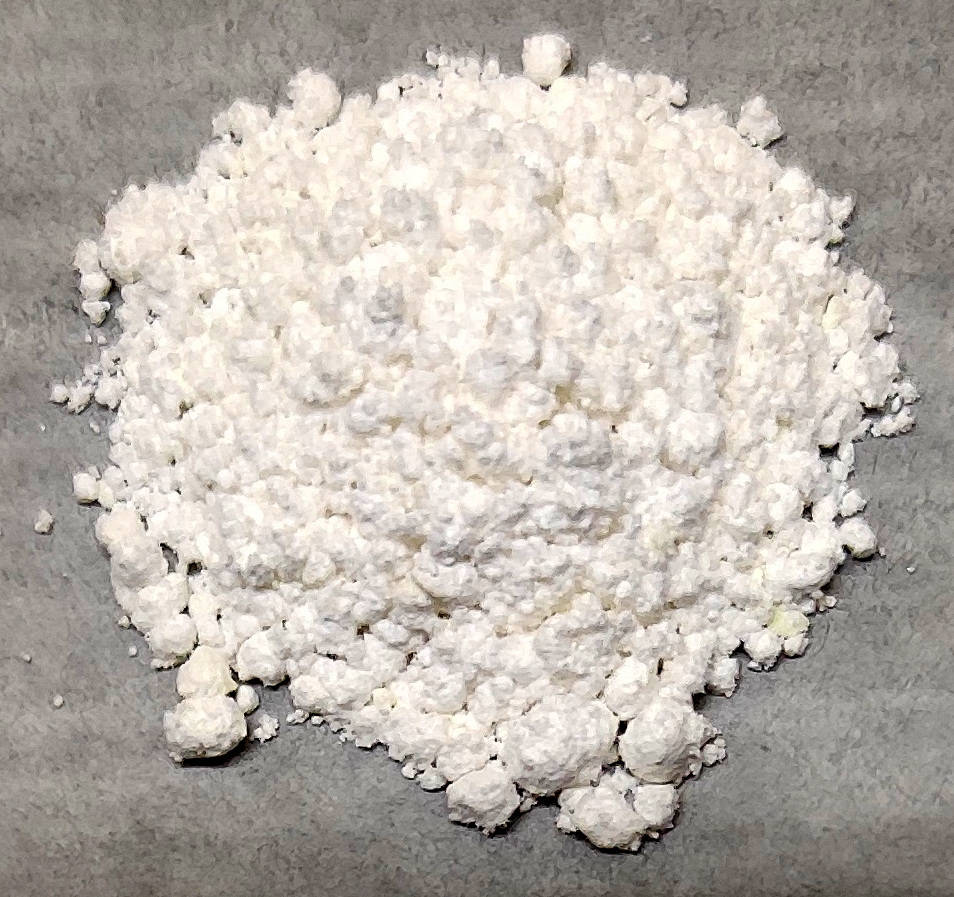

Names
- Systematic IUPAC name Dibismuth trisulfate
- Other names: Bismuth trisulfate

Identifiers
| CAS Number | 7787-68-0 |
| 3D model (JSmol) | Interactive image |
| ChemSpider | 171500 |
| ECHA InfoCard | 100.029.208 |
| EC Number | 232-129-5 |
| PubChem CID | 198144 |
| UNII | 68FE11533K |
| CompTox Dashboard (EPA) | DTXSID10188121 |
- InChI: InChI=1S/2Bi.3H2O4S/c;;3*1-5(2,3)4/h;;3*(H2,1,2,3,4)/q2*+3;;;/p-6 Key: BEQZMQXCOWIHRY-UHFFFAOYSA-H
- SMILES: [O-]S(=O)(=O)[O-].[O-]S(=O)(=O)[O-].[O-]S(=O)(=O)[O-].[Bi+3].[Bi+3]

Properties
| Chemical formula | Bi_{2}(SO_{4})_{3} |
| Molar mass | 706.15 g/mol |
| Appearance | White solid |
| Density | 5.31 g/cm^{3} |
| Melting point | 465 °C (869 °F; 738 K) (decomposes) |
| Solubility in water | Hydrolysis |

Structure
| Crystal structure | monoclinic |
| Space group | P2_{1}/n |
| Lattice constant | a = 13.08 Å, b = 4.73 Å, c = 14.52 Å α = 90°, β = 100.9°, γ = 90° |
| Formula units (Z) | 4 |

Hazards
- GHS labelling
| Pictograms | (GHS07: Exclamation mark) |
| Signal word | Warning |
| Hazard statements | H315, H319, H335 |
| Precautionary statements | P261, P264, P264+P265, P271, P280, P302+P352, P304+P340, P305+P351+P338, P319, P321, P332+P317, P337+P317, P362+P364, P403+P233, P405, P501 |
| NFPA 704 (fire diamond) | 0 0 0 |

Related compounds
| Other anions | Bismuth(III) nitrate |
| Other cations | Antimony(III) sulfate |
- Except where otherwise noted, data are given for materials in their standard state (at 25 °C [77 °F], 100 kPa). Infobox references

Bismuth(III) sulfate is an inorganic chemical compound of bismuth with the formula Bi_{2}(SO_{4})_{3}. It is a hygroscopic white solid that decomposes at 465 °C to bismuth(III) oxysulfate and is isotypic to antimony(III) sulfate.

== Production ==
Bismuth(III) sulfate is most commonly produced from the reaction of bismuth(III) nitrate and sulfuric acid:

2 Bi(NO_{3})_{3} + 3 H_{2}SO_{4} → Bi_{2}(SO_{4})_{3} + 6 HNO_{3}

Another polymorph of bismuth(III) sulfate can be produced by the treatment of lithium bismuthate(III) with sulfuric acid.

== Properties ==
Bismuth(III) sulfate decomposes at 465 °C to Bi_{2}O(SO_{4})_{2}. If continually heated, it decomposes to various bismuth oxysulfates and at 950 °C it decomposes to bismuth(III) oxide. Bismuth(III) sulfate hydrolyzes in water.
