= Triazolite =

Organic mineral

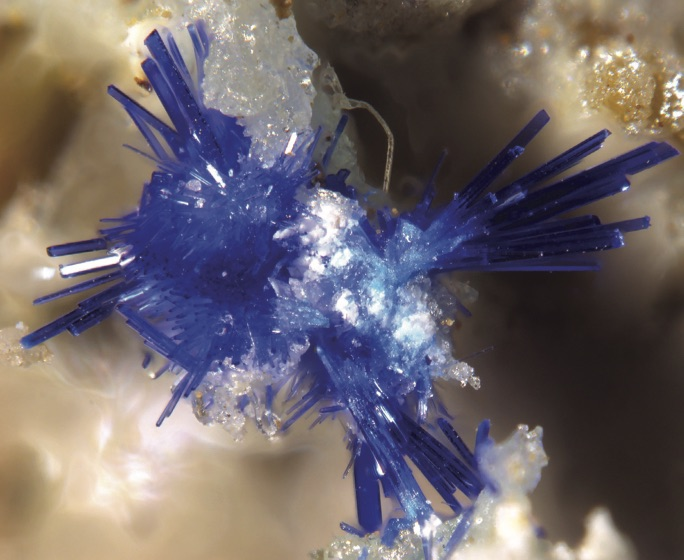
- Closeup of a triazolite crystal

General
- Category: Minerals
- Formula: NaCu_{2}(N_{3}C_{2}H_{2})_{2}(NH_{3})_{2}Cl_{3}·4H_{2}O
- IMA symbol: Tzl
- Crystal system: Orthorhombic

Identification
- Color: Deep blue

Triazolite is an organic mineral with the chemical structure of NaCu_{2}(N_{3}C_{2}H_{2})_{2}(NH_{3})_{2}Cl_{3}·4H_{2}O, and is formed in conjunction with chanabayite, another natural triazolate anion salt. Triazolite has only been found in Pabellón de Pica, Chanabaya, Iquique Province, Tarapacá Region, Chile, due to its specific requirements for formation. The first specimens of triazolite were found in what is suspected to be the guano of the guanay cormorant. The guano reacted to chalcopyrite-bearing gabbro, allowing the formation for triazolite to take place. Triazolite was initially grouped together with chanabayite in 2015, and wasn't identified as a separate mineral until 2017.
