= Ceration =

Chemical process

Ceration is a chemical process, a common practice in alchemy. It is performed by continuously adding a liquid by imbibition to a hard, dry substance while it is heated. Typically, this treatment makes the substance softer, more like molten wax (cera in Latin). Pseudo-Geber's Summa Perfectionis explains that ceration is "the mollification of an hard thing, not fusible unto liquefaction", and stresses the importance of correct humidity in the process.

Antoine-Joseph Pernety's 1787 mytho-Hermetic dictionary defines it somewhat differently as the time when matter passes from black to gray, and then to white. Continuous cooking effects this change. Ceration may be synonymous with similar terms for alchemical burning processes. Incineration, for example is listed by Manly P. Hall.

== See also ==
- Calcination
- Incineration
