= Tripuhyite =

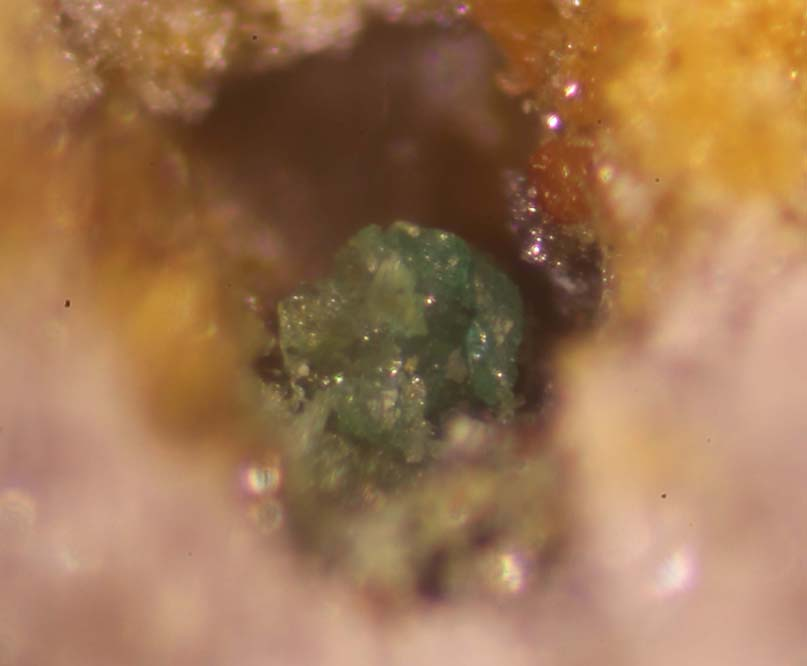
- Tripuhyite from the Tafone Mine, Grosseto Province, Tuscany, Italy

General
- Category: Antimonate mineral
- Formula: FeSbO_{4}
- IMA symbol: Tpy
- Strunz classification: 4.DB.05
- Crystal system: Tetragonal
- Crystal class: Ditetragonal dipyramidal (4/mmm); H-M symbol: (4/m 2/m 2/m)
- Space group: P4_{1}/mnm
- Unit cell: a = 4.63, c = 9.14 [Å]; Z = 2

Identification
- Color: Yellowish brown, lemon-yellow, brown-black
- Crystal habit: Fibrous to fine-grained aggregates
- Mohs scale hardness: 6 - 7
- Luster: Dull to earthy
- Streak: Canary-yellow to dark brown with a greenish tinge
- Diaphaneity: Translucent
- Specific gravity: 5.82
- Optical properties: Uniaxial (+), canary-yellow color (transmitted light)
- Refractive index: n_{ω} = 2.190 n_{ε} = 2.330
- Birefringence: δ = 0.140
- Pleochroism: None
- Solubility: Insoluble in acids
- Other characteristics: Antiferromagnetic

Tripuhyite is an iron antimonate mineral with composition FeSbO_{4}.

== Nomenclature ==
The name of the mineral comes from the locality of Tripuhy, Ouro Preto, Minas Gerais, Brazil, where it was discovered. Hussak and Prior first described the mineral tripuhyite as an oxide of iron and antimony, and assigned it the composition Fe_{2}Sb_{2}O_{7}. When a mineral with composition FeSbO_{4} was later discovered in Squaw Creek, New Mexico (US), it was considered erroneously as a new mineral and it was given the name squawcreekite. However, other studies had shown that the original tripuhyite was also FeSbO_{4}. In 2002, the Commission on New Minerals and Mineral Names (CNMMN) of the International Mineralogical Association (IMA), approved the redefinition of tripuhyite as FeSbO_{4} and the discreditation of squawcreekite.

== Crystal Structure ==
FeSbO_{4} exhibits the rutile structure, with a tetragonal unit cell. The cations are octahedrally coordinated to oxygen anions, with the octahedra sharing edges along the c-direction. Fe(III) and Sb(V) cations are distributed in a disordered way over the octahedral sites.

== Bibliography ==
- Palache, P.; Berman H.; Frondel, C. (1960). "Dana's System of Mineralogy, Volume II: Halides, Nitrates, Borates, Carbonates, Sulfates, Phosphates, Arsenates, Tungstates, Molybdates, Etc. (Seventh Edition)" John Wiley and Sons, Inc., New York, pp. 1024.
