= Triazolate =

Names
- IUPAC name 1,2-diaza-4-azanidacyclopenta-2,5-diene

Identifiers
3D model (JSmol)	1,2,4: Interactive image; 1,2,3: Interactive image
Abbreviations	tz
ChemSpider	1,2,4: 2906269
PubChem CID	1,2,4: 3673436; 1,2,3: 20248821
- InChI: InChI=1S/C2H2N3/c1-3-2-5-4-1/h1-2H/q-1 Key: OCYPXODIXIRXRC-UHFFFAOYSA-N; 1,2,3: InChI=1S/C2H2N3/c1-2-4-5-3-1/h1-2H/q-1 Key: KLUPXSZYZIVRAV-UHFFFAOYSA-N
- SMILES: 1,2,4: C1=NN=C[N-]1; 1,2,3: C1=N[N-]N=C1

Properties
Chemical formula	C_{2}H_{2}N_{3}^{−}
Molar mass	68.060 g·mol^{−1}
- Except where otherwise noted, data are given for materials in their standard state (at 25 °C [77 °F], 100 kPa). Infobox references

A triazolate is a salt derived from a triazole by the replacement of a proton with a cation. Different isomers exist 1,2,4-triazolate or 1,2,3-triazolate, both are unsaturated heterocyclic ring compounds containing three nitrogen atoms. The basic formula is C_{2}N_{3}H_{2}^{−}. It can be abbreviated by "tz".

Known compounds include zinc, and natural copper minerals, chanabayaite and triazolite.

Trizolate is a tridentate ligand, and can form complexes with metals via the three nitrogen atoms. This enables polymers or metal organic framework compounds to be formed. Triazolate can also be substituted on its carbon atoms.
