= Antimonate =

Chemical compound

In chemistry an antimonate is a compound which contains a metallic element, oxygen, and antimony in an oxidation state of +5. These compounds adopt polymeric structures with M-O-Sb linkages. They can be considered to be derivatives of the hypothetical antimonic acid H_{3}SbO_{4}, or combinations of metal oxides and antimony pentoxide, Sb_{2}O_{5}.

Historically these compounds were assumed to be analogous to the phosphates and formulas such as LiSbO_{3}·3H_{2}O and Na_{2}H_{2}Sb_{2}O_{7}·5H_{2}O were used and the compounds described as hydrated meta-antimonates and pyro-antimonates. It is now known that LiSbO_{3}·3H_{2}O is actually LiSb(OH)_{6}, containing the [Sb(OH)_{6}]^{−} anion, and that Na_{2}H_{2}Sb_{2}O_{7}·5H_{2}O is actually NaSb(OH)_{6}.

== Nomenclature ==
IUPAC recommendations are that compounds with anions containing antimony(V) have the antimonate(V) suffix or antimonate followed by a charge number, for example the [Sb(OH)_{6}]^{−} ion would be called hexahydridoxidoantimonate(V) or alternatively hexahydroxidoantimonate(1−).

== Examples ==
Some examples of antimonates and their structures are shown below:

- Li_{3}SbO_{4} has a NaCl superstructure with isolated Sb_{4}O^{12−}_{16} units.
- Sodium antimonate, NaSbO_{3}, has the ilmenite structure, with hexagonal close packed oxide ions with each ion, Na^{+} and Sb^{5+} occupying a third of the octahedral sites.
- MgSb_{2}O_{6} has the trirutile structure, which is similar to the rutile structure except that there are two different cations in the lattice.
- AlSbO_{4} has the rutile structure with random occupancy.
- Lead antimonate, Pb_{2}Sb_{2}O_{7}, Naples yellow, has the pyrochlore structure.
- Calcium antimonate, Ca_{2}Sb_{2}O_{7}, has the weberite structure.
- Ferric ortho-antimonate, Fe_{2}O_{3}·Sb_{2}O_{5} or FeSbO_{4}, has the rutile structure with random occupancy.

== See also ==
- Antimonate mineral
- Antimonide
- Antimonite
