= Chanabayaite =

Triazolate mineral

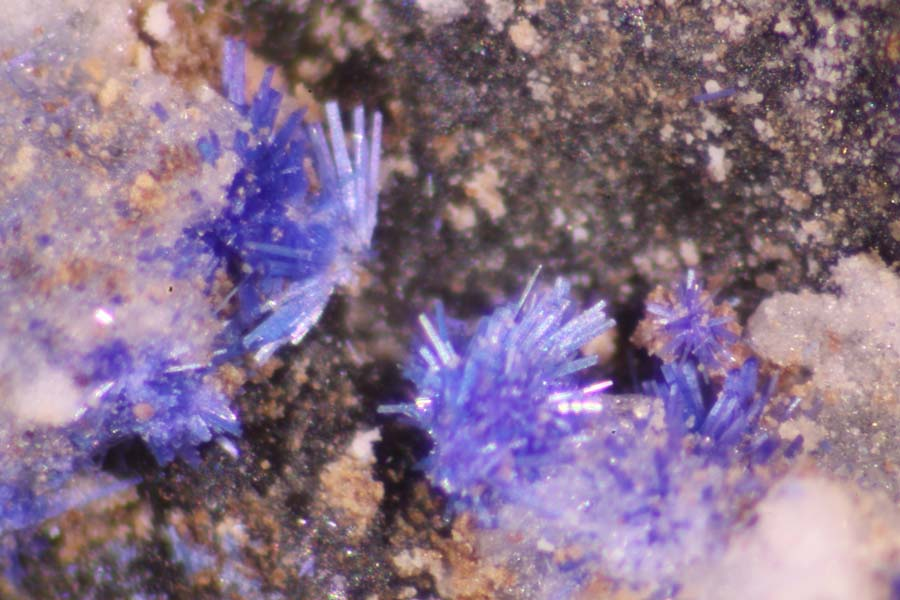

General
- Category: Organic mineral
- Formula: Cu_{2}(N_{3}C_{2}H_{2}Cl(NH_{3},Cl,H_{2}O,[])_{4}
- IMA symbol: Cba
- Crystal system: Orthorhombic
- Crystal class: Dipyramidal (mmm); H-M symbol: (2/m 2/m 2/m)
- Space group: Imma
- Unit cell: a = 19.48, b = 7.21, c = 11.999 [Å] (approximated); Z = 4

Identification
- Color: Blue
- Crystal habit: Prisms (imperfect); radial aggregates
- Cleavage: (001), perfect; (100) and (010), imperfect
- Tenacity: Brittle
- Mohs scale hardness: 2
- Density: 1.48 (measured)
- Pleochroism: Deep blue to pale blue with gray hue (strong)

Chanabayaite is the first recognized triazolate mineral, having the formula Cu_{2}(N_{3}C_{2}H_{2}Cl(NH_{3},Cl,H_{2}O,[])_{4}.

Minor iron admixture is also present. It is also one of a few currently known minerals containing ammine groups, including also ammineite, joanneumite and shilovite. All the minerals are rare and were found in a single guano deposit in Chile, called Pabellón de Pica. A similar natural phase, formula NaCu_{2}Cl_{3}[N_{3}C_{2}H_{2}]_{2}[NH_{3}]_{2}•4H_{2}O, likely a precursor of chanabayaite, is described by Zubkova et al. 2016.

== Crystal structure ==
The main features of the crystal structure of chanabayaite are:

- copper forms octahedra, part of which share corners
- 1,2,4-triazolate anions link the octahedra

== Association ==
Chanabayaite coexists with halite, joanneumite, nitratine, salammoniac and paragenetically-unrelated chalcopyrite. Chalcopyrite is present in an amphibole- and plagioclase-bearing gabbro, that contacts the guano deposit.

== Formation ==
Three suggested processes account for the formation of chanabayaite:

- leaching of sodium from the precursor phase
- leaching of chlorine from the precursor phase
- partial dehydratation of the precursor phase

== See also ==
- Triazole
- Coordination complex
- Mineralogy
- Guano
- Secondary mineral
