= Earth symbol =

Astronomical symbols for the planet Earth, alchemical symbol for the element Earth

🜨 ♁ ☷ 🜃o

Earth symbol
- In Unicode: U+1F728 🜨 ALCHEMICAL SYMBOL FOR VERDIGRIS; U+2641 ♁ EARTH (Globus cruciger); U+2637 ☷ TRIGRAM FOR EARTH; U+1F703 🜃 ALCHEMICAL SYMBOL FOR EARTH

Different from
- Different from: U+23DA ⏚ EARTH GROUND; Electrical earth (ground)

A variety of symbols or iconographic conventions are used to represent Earth, whether in the sense of planet Earth, or the inhabited world, or as a classical element. A circle representing the round world, with the rivers of Garden of Eden separating the four corners of the world, or rotated 45° to suggest the four continents, remains a common pictographic convention to express the notion of "worldwide". The current astronomical symbols for the planet are a circle with an intersecting cross,, and a globus cruciger,. Although the International Astronomical Union (IAU) now discourages the use of planetary symbols, this is an exception, being used in abbreviations such as M_{🜨} or M_{♁} for Earth mass.

== History ==
The earliest type of symbols are allegories, personifications or deifications, mostly in the form of an Earth goddess (in the case of Egyptian mythology a god, Geb).

Before the recognition of the spherical shape of the Earth in the Hellenistic period, the main attribute of the Earth was its being flat. The Egyptian hieroglyph for "earth, land" depicts a stretch of flat alluvial land with grains of sand (Gardiner N16: 𓇾). The Sumerian cuneiform sign for "earth, place" KI (𒆠) originates as a picture of a "threshing floor", and the Chinese character (土) originated as a lump of clay on a potting wheel.

== Earth, the classical element ==
In Chinese mysticism, the classical element "Earth" is represented by the trigram of three broken lines in the I Ching (☷).

The Western (early modern) alchemical symbol for earth is a downward-pointing triangle bisected by a horizontal line (🜃). Other symbols for the earth in alchemy or mysticism include the square and the serpent.

== The planet ==
In the Roman period, the globe, a representation of the spherical Earth, became the main symbol representing the concept. The globe depicted the "universe" (pictured as the celestial sphere) as well as the Earth.

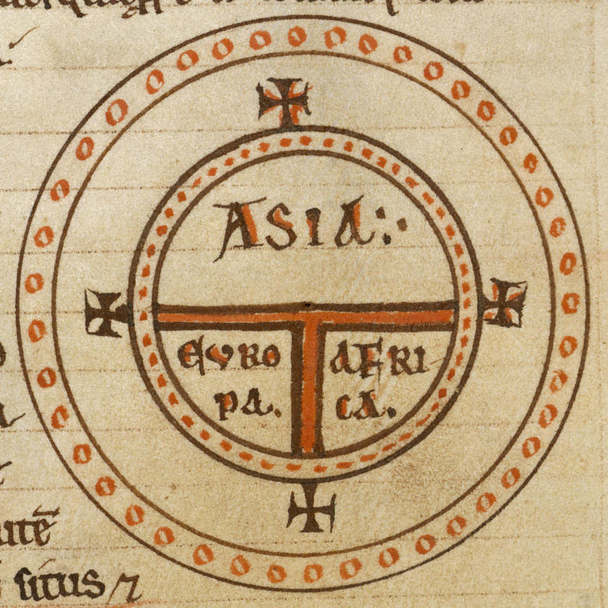
12th-century T-and-O representation of the world.

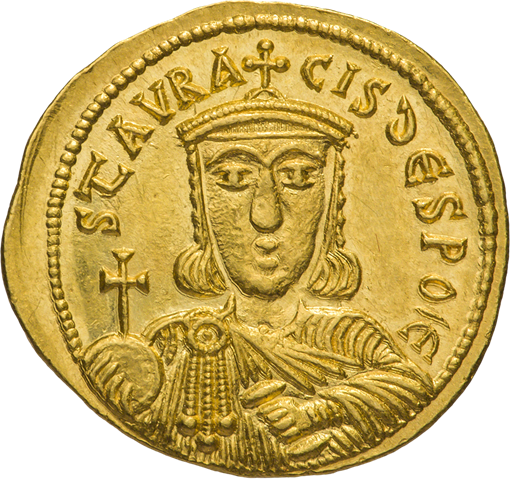
Byzantine Solidus coin with a Byzantine Emperor holding a globus cruciger in his right hand.

The globus cruciger (♁) is the globe surmounted by a Christian cross, held by Byzantine Emperors on the one hand to represent the Christian ecumene, on the other hand the akakia represented the mortal nature of all men.

In the medieval period, the known world was also represented by the T-and-O figure, a symbolic world map of the three classical continents of the Old World, viz. Asia, Europe and Africa (in various orientations:,, and originally).

Unicode encodes four characters representing the globe in the Miscellaneous Symbols and Pictographs block:

- EARTH GLOBE EUROPE-AFRICA U+1F30D 🌍
- EARTH GLOBE AMERICAS U+1F30E 🌎
- EARTH GLOBE ASIA-AUSTRALIA U+1F30F 🌏
- GLOBE WITH MERIDIANS U+1F310 🌐

== See also ==
- Astrological sign § Polarity – Polarity and the four elements
- Atlas (mythology) – Deity in Greek mythology
- Crossed O – Cyrillic letter of similar appearance
- Earth in culture – Cultural perspectives about Earth
- Electrical earth – Reference point in an electrical circuit from which voltages are measured
- Flag of Earth – Conceptual flag
- Planetary symbols – Graphical symbols used in astrology and astronomy
- Radical 32 – Kangxi radical meaning 'earth'
- Solar symbol – Symbol representing the Sun
- Sun cross – Circle containing four or more spokes
- T and O map – Type of medieval world map
- Terra (mythology) – Personification of Earth in ancient Rome
