= Antimony regulus =

Partially purified antimony

Antimony regulus or antimony metal is a partially purified form of the element antimony. In modern commerce, it typically contains 0.4% to 1.0% of impurities, which typically include primarily arsenic, and smaller amounts of sulfur, zinc and iron. Selenium as an impurity is rare, but for some purposes must be avoided; other problematic impurities for various applications include copper, nickel, and lead.

Typical commercial antimony is unsuitable for production of solid-state-electronics devices, and for these 99.95% pure material is typically demanded.
