= Antoine-Joseph Pernety =

French writer (1716–1796)

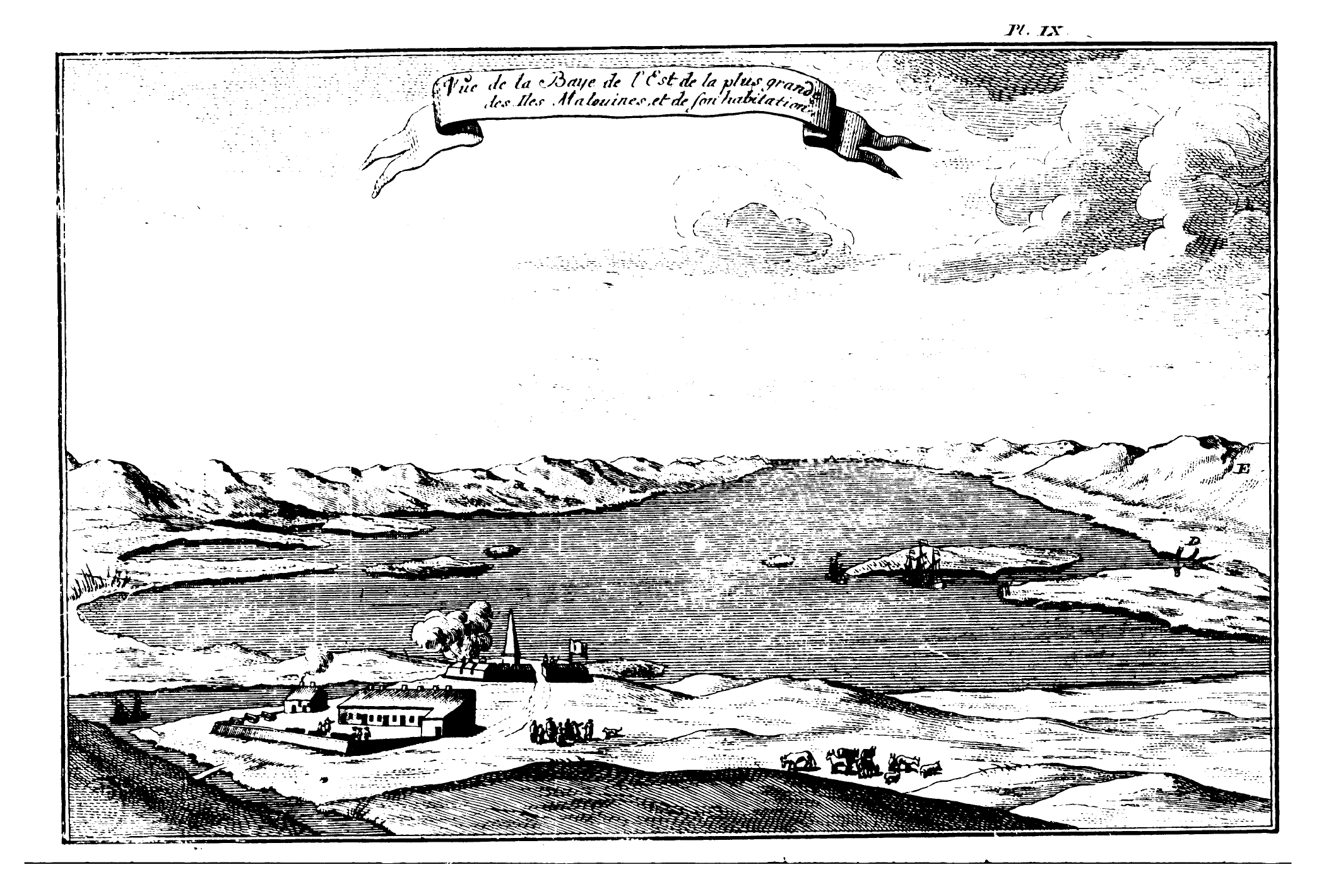
- Port Saint Louis, Falkland Islands. Dom Pernety, 1769
- Born: 23 February 1716; Roanne, Auvergne-Rhône-Alpes, France
- Died: 16 October 1796 (aged 80); Avignon, Provence-Alpes-Côte d'Azur, France
- Occupation: Writer

Antoine-Joseph Pernety, known as Dom Pernety (23 February 1716 – 16 October 1796), was a French writer. At various times he was a Benedictine and librarian of Frederick the Great of Prussia. Together with the Polish Count Tadeusz Grabianka, also influenced by the Christian mysticism of Swedenborg he founded in 1760 the secret society of "Rite hermétique" or Illuminati of Avignon.

Pernety was born at Roanne. He took part in the 1763–64 expedition under Louis Antoine de Bougainville that established the Port Saint Louis settlement in the Falkland Islands, and published a two-volume account of his nature exploration of the Falklands and the Brazilian island of Santa Catarina. In particular, he gave the first description of the Falklands stone runs phenomenon.

In 1767 Pernety moved to Berlin. In 1779 he became a member of Illuminés of Avignon. In 1780 the oracle "la Sainte Parole" began to advise the Illuminés of Avignon to leave Berlin to establish elsewhere the foundations of a new Sion. In 1783 Pernety left Berlin at the command of the oracle. In October 1784 the oracle told the group that it should move to Avignon. In 1793 Illuminés of Avignon were suppressed by law. Pernety died in Avignon.

In 1782 Pernety translated from Latin into French Emanuel Swedenborg's Heaven and Hell and in 1786 Swedenborg's Divine Love and Wisdom.

== Publications ==
- Manuel bénédictin, contenant l'Imitation de Jésus-Christ; la Règle de saint Benoist; les Exercices tirés de cette règle; et la Conduite pour la retraite du mois (1755).
- Dictionnaire portatif de peinture, sculpture et gravure avec un traité pratique des différentes manières de peindre, dont la théorie est développée dans les articles qui en sont susceptibles. Ouvrage utile aux artistes, aux élèves & aux amateurs (1757) Online text.
- Les Fables égyptiennes et grecques dévoilées et réduites au même principe, avec une explication des hiéroglyphes et de la guerre de Troye (1758). Réédition: La Table d'émeraude, Paris, 1982. Online vol. 1 & vol. 2.
- Dictionnaire mytho-hermétique, dans lequel on trouve les allégories fabuleuses des poètes, les métaphores, les énigmes et les termes barbares des philosophes hermétiques expliqués (1758). Réédition: Bibliotheca Hermetica, 1972.
- Journal historique d'un voyage fait aux îles Malouines en 1763 et 1764 pour les reconnoître et y former un établissement et de deux voyages au détroit de Magellan avec une relation sur les Patagons (2 volumes, 1769) .Online vol. 1 & vol. 2
- Discours sur la physionomie et les avantages des connoissances physionomiques (1769).
- Dissertation sur l'Amérique & les Américains (1769).
- Examen des Recherches philosophiques sur l'Amérique et les Américains, et de la Défense de cet ouvrage (1771).
- Les Vertus, le pouvoir, la clémence et la gloire de Marie, mère de Dieu (1790) Online text.
