= Antimonate mineral =

Minerals containing the antimonate anion group

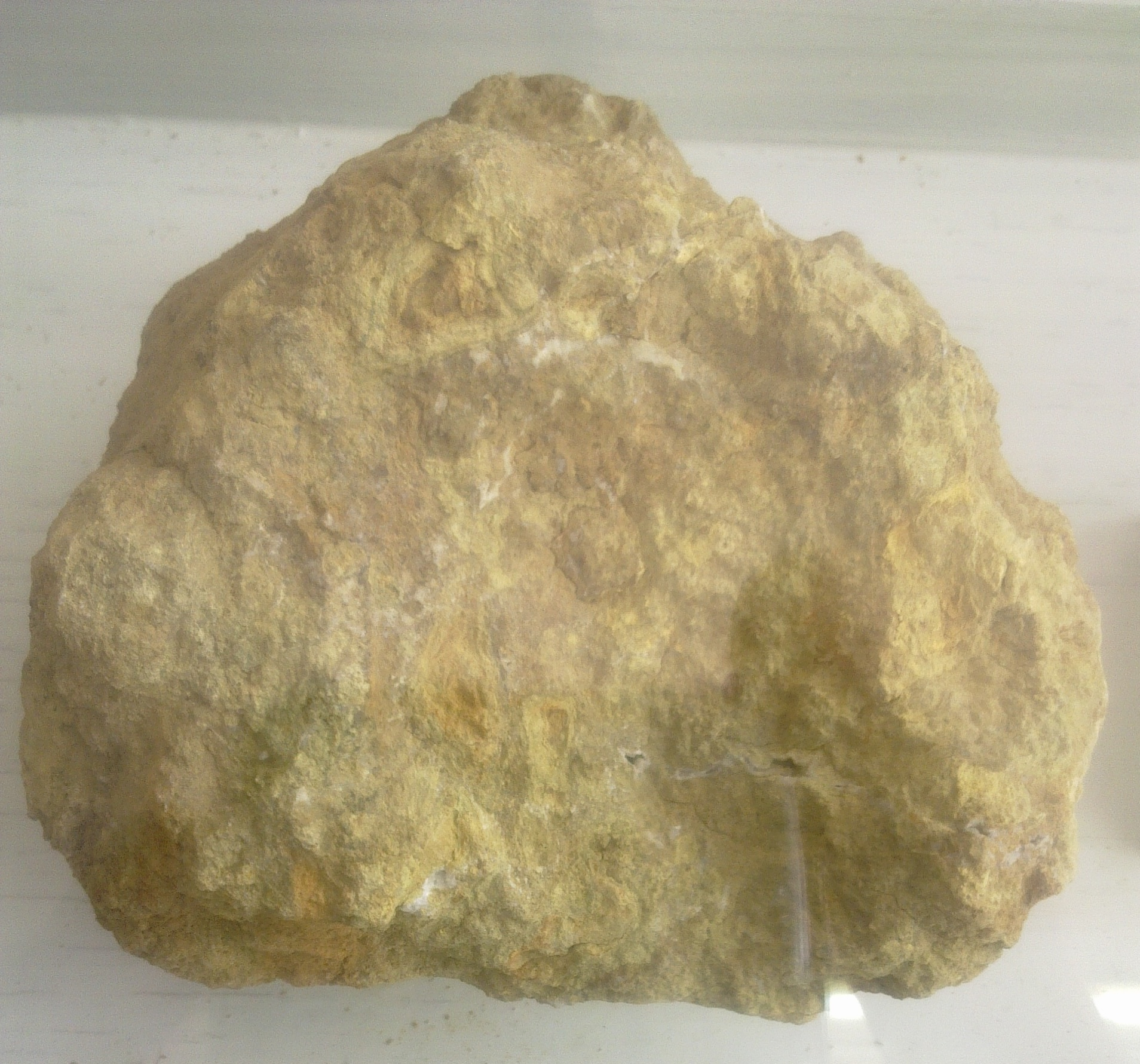
Bindheimite, an antimonate mineral

Antimonate minerals are those minerals containing the antimonate (SbO_{4}^{3−}) anion group, where antimony is in the 5+ oxidation state. Both the Dana and the Strunz mineral classifications place the antimonates in with the phosphate minerals.
