= Digestion (alchemy) =

Process of applying heat over weeks

In alchemy, digestion refers to the process by which raw materials are transformed into a more purified or refined state. This concept is akin to the biological process of digestion in living organisms, where food is broken down into simpler forms for nourishment. However, in alchemy, digestion is metaphorical and symbolic rather than biological. The term is often used to describe the maturation of materials, where a substance undergoes a series of stages that lead to its ultimate transformation. This process typically involves heat, moisture, and time, allowing the substance to be 'digested' or broken down into its essence. Alchemy describes several stages of digestion, which are critical to achieving the 'philosopher's stone,' the legendary substance thought to grant immortality and the ability to transmute base metals into gold.

The alchemists believed that artificial metallic transmutation was possible as an analogy to what appeared to be a naturally occurring process of base metals being transformed into more noble ones, as their compositions were slowly altered over a period of thousands of years by the action of subterranean heat and water.

== The key stages ==
=== Calcination ===
This is the initial stage where the material is subjected to heat, leading to the release of volatile substances. In this phase, the material is broken down into ash, representing the stripping away of impurities.

=== Dissolution ===
Following calcination, the ashes are dissolved in a liquid, often water or an acidic solution. This step symbolizes the dissolution of the ego and the surrender of the self, paving the way for spiritual and material transformation.

=== Separation ===
The next phase involves separating the dissolved substance from any residual impurities. This process highlights the importance of discernment in both material and spiritual contexts.

=== Conjunction ===
After separation, the purified elements are recombined, creating a new, more refined substance. This symbolizes the integration of opposites, such as the masculine and feminine, leading to balance and harmony.

=== Fermentation ===
This stage represents a new birth or awakening. The material is subjected to processes that invoke change, often aided by the introduction of a 'soul' or spirit to the mixture.

=== Distillation ===
After fermentation, the mixture undergoes distillation, where it is purified through boiling and condensation. This step is crucial for removing remaining impurities and concentrating the essence of the material.

=== Coagulation ===
The final stage of digestion involves the solidification of the purified substance into its ultimate form. This symbolizes the achievement of the philosopher's stone, a representation of perfection and enlightenment.
