= Antimony(III) sulfate =

Antimony sulfate

Names
- IUPAC name Antimony(III) sulfate
- Other names Antimonous sulfate Antimony trisulfate Diantimony trisulfate Diantimony tris(sulphate)

Identifiers
CAS Number	7446-32-4
3D model (JSmol)	Interactive image
ChemSpider	22443
ECHA InfoCard	100.028.370
EC Number	231-207-6
PubChem CID	24010
UNII	HN58C3HK0X
CompTox Dashboard (EPA)	DTXSID10225469
- InChI: InChI=1S/3H2O4S.2Sb/c3*1-5(2,3)4;;/h3*(H2,1,2,3,4);;/q;;;2*+3/p-6 Key: MVMLTMBYNXHXFI-UHFFFAOYSA-H
- SMILES: [SbH3+3].[SbH3+3].[O-]S(=O)(=O)[O-].[O-]S([O-])(=O)=O.[O-]S([O-])(=O)=O

Properties
Chemical formula	Sb_{2}(SO_{4})_{3}
Molar mass	531.7078 g/mol
Density	3.94 g/cm^{3}
Solubility in water	Hydrolysis

Structure
Crystal structure	monoclinic
Space group	P2_{1}/c
Lattice constant	a = 13.12 Å, b = 4.75 Å, c = 17.55 Å α = 90°, β = 126.3°, γ = 90°
Lattice volume (V)	881 Å^{3}

Hazards
- NIOSH (US health exposure limits)
PEL (Permissible)	TWA 0.5 mg/m^{3} (as Sb)
REL (Recommended)	TWA 0.5 mg/m^{3} (as Sb)
Safety data sheet (SDS)	MSDS
- Except where otherwise noted, data are given for materials in their standard state (at 25 °C [77 °F], 100 kPa). (what is ?) Infobox references

Antimony sulfate, Sb_{2}(SO_{4})_{3}, is a hygroscopic salt formed by reacting antimony or its compounds with hot sulfuric acid. It is used in doping of semiconductors and in the production of explosives and fireworks.

== Structure ==
Antimony(III) sulfate consists of interconnected SbO_{6} octahedra, which the corners are bonded to the sulfate ion.

== Production ==
Antimony(III) sulfate was first produced in 1827 by the reaction of antimony(III) oxide and 18 molar sulfuric acid at 200 °C:

Sb_{2}O_{3} + 3 H_{2}SO_{4} → Sb_{2}(SO_{4})_{3} + 3 H_{2}O

The concentration of the sulfuric acid is important, as a lower concentration will produce basic antimony oxides, while a higher concentration will produce antimony(III) pyrosulfate. The reaction of elemental antimony and 18 M sulfuric acid will also produce antimony(III) sulfate:

2 Sb + 6 H_{2}SO_{4} → Sb_{2}(SO_{4})_{3} + 3 SO_{2} + 6 H_{2}O

== Chemical properties ==
Antimony sulfate is deliquescent, hydrolyzing in moist air and water, producing various basic antimony oxides and antimony(III) oxide. It is soluble in acids.

== Uses ==
Owing to its solubility, antimony sulfate has uses in the doping of semiconductors. It is also used for coating anodes in electrolysis and in the production of explosives and fireworks.

== Safety ==
Antimony(III) sulfate causes irritation to the skin and mucous membranes.

== Natural occurrence ==
Natural analogue of the exact compound is yet unknown. However, basic hydrated Sb sulfates are known as the minerals klebelsbergite and coquandite.
