= Salammoniac =

Halide mineral

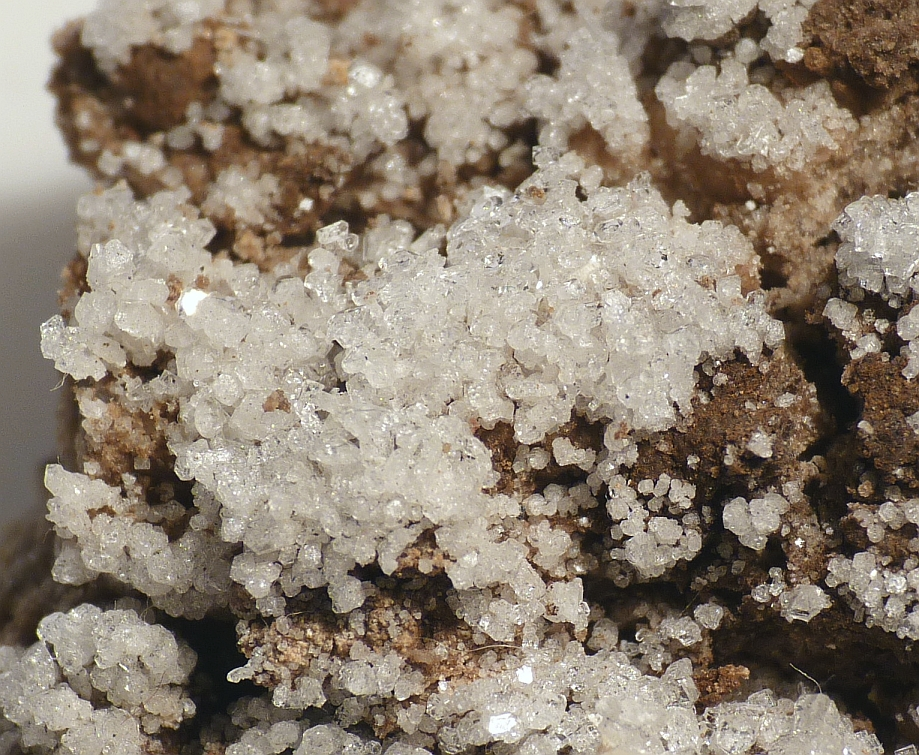
- Salammoniac crystals from a mine in Eisden, Maasmechelen, Limburg, Belgium (field of vision: 1.5 cm)

General
- Category: Halide mineral
- Formula: NH_{4}Cl
- IMA symbol: Sam
- Strunz classification: 3.AA.25
- Crystal system: Isometric
- Crystal class: Hexoctahedral (m3̅m); H-M symbol: (4/m 3̅ 2/m)
- Space group: Pm3̅m
- Unit cell: a = 3.859 Å; Z = 1

Identification
- Formula mass: 53.49 g/mol
- Color: Colorless, white, pale gray; may be pale yellow to brown, if impure.
- Crystal habit: Crystals skeletal or dendritic; massive, encrustations
- Twinning: On {111}
- Cleavage: Imperfect on {111}
- Fracture: Conchoidal
- Tenacity: Sectile
- Mohs scale hardness: 1–2
- Luster: Vitreous
- Streak: White
- Diaphaneity: Transparent
- Specific gravity: 1.535
- Optical properties: Isotropic
- Refractive index: n = 1.639
- Birefringence: Weak after deformation
- Ultraviolet fluorescence: No
- Absorption spectra: No
- Solubility: In water

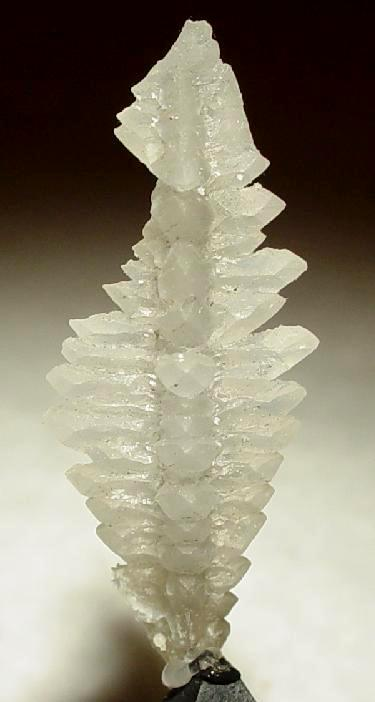
Salammoniac crystal from Ravat Village, Tajikistan. One of many unusual salammoniac crystal specimens found in the area of Ravat Village, near Yaghnob River, where the crystals have grown in a feather-like or three-dimensional arborescent. Size: miniature, 3.3 × 1.4 × 1.4 cm

Salammoniac, also sal ammoniac or salmiac, is a rare naturally occurring mineral composed of ammonium chloride, NH_{4}Cl. It forms colorless, white, or yellow-brown crystals in the isometric-hexoctahedral class. It has very poor cleavage and is brittle to conchoidal fracture. It is quite soft, with a Mohs hardness of 1.5 to 2, and it has a low specific gravity of 1.5. It is water-soluble. Salammoniac is also the archaic name for the chemical compound ammonium chloride.

== History ==
Pliny, in Book XXXI of his Natural History, refers to a salt produced in the Roman province of Cyrenaica named hammoniacum, so called because of its proximity to the nearby Temple of Jupiter Amun (Greek Ἄμμων Ammon). However, the description Pliny gives of the salt does not conform to the properties of ammonium chloride. According to Herbert Hoover's commentary in his English translation of Georgius Agricola's De re metallica, it is likely to have been common sea salt. Nevertheless, that salt ultimately gave ammonia and ammonium compounds their name.

The first attested reference to sal ammoniac as ammonium chloride is in the Pseudo-Geber work De inventione veritatis, where a preparation of sal ammoniac is given in the chapter De Salis armoniaci præparatione, salis armoniaci being a common name in the Middle Ages for sal ammoniac.

It typically forms as encrustations formed by sublimation around volcanic vents and is found around volcanic fumaroles, guano deposits and burning coal seams. Associated minerals include sodium alum, native sulfur and other fumarole minerals. Notable occurrences include Tajikistan; Mount Vesuvius, Italy; and Parícutin, Michoacan, Mexico.

The alchemical symbol for Salammoniac is 🜹.

== Uses ==
It is commonly used to clean the soldering iron in the soldering of stained-glass windows.

=== Metal refining ===
In jewellery-making and the refining of precious metals, potassium carbonate is added to gold and silver in a borax-coated crucible to purify iron or steel filings that may have contaminated the scrap. It is then air-cooled and remelted with a one-to-one mixture of powdered charcoal and salammoniac to yield a sturdy ingot of the respective metal or alloy in the case of sterling silver (7.5% copper) or karated gold.

=== Food ===
Salammoniac has also been used in the past in bakery products to give cookies or biscuits their crisp texture, but it has largely been abandoned in favor of modern baking powder or baking soda (sodium bicarbonate).

Salammoniac is used to make salty liquorice (salmiak).

=== Dyeing ===
In addition, the mineral or, better, its synthetic counterpart, also serves for the production of cooling baths as well as in dyeing and leather tanning.

=== Electronics ===
Salammoniac (as ammonium chloride) was the electrolyte in Leclanché cells, a forerunner of the dry battery; a carbon rod and a zinc rod or cylinder formed the electrodes.

=== Medicine ===
It was also brought into pharmacopeias by Islamic physicians for medicinal purposes.

In the 14th-century "The Canon's Yeoman's Tale" one of Chaucer's The Canterbury Tales, an alchemist purports to use sal armonyak as smelling salts.

A medical manuscript compiled in 1666 included a recipe for "making Sal Ammoniac according to Robert Boyle" (the noted scientist). It says when inhaled, salammoniac can help "giddyness of the head & in violent Headaches, & in epileptick fits" as well as easing "obstinate griefe & Melancholy.". The use of "smelling salts" for reviving faint-hearted females became common during Victorian times. Smelling salts contain mostly Ammonium Carbonate rather than Ammonium Chloride. Nevertheless, smelling salts are also often known as "sal ammoniac". Many athletes use it for reviving them during sports activities.
