= List of minor planets: 888001–889000 =

The following is a partial list of minor planets, running from minor-planet number 888001 through 889000, inclusive. The primary data for this and other partial lists is based on JPL's "Small-Body Orbital Elements" and data available from the Minor Planet Center. Critical list information is also provided by the MPC, unless otherwise specified from Lowell Observatory. A detailed description of the table's columns and additional sources are given on the main page including a complete list of every page in this series, and a statistical break-up on the dynamical classification of minor planets.

Also see the summary list of all named bodies in numerical and alphabetical order, and the corresponding naming citations for the number range of this particular list. New namings may only be added to this list after official publication, as the preannouncement of names is condemned by the Working Group for Small Bodies Nomenclature of the International Astronomical Union.

Near-Earth obj.	MBA (inner)	MBA (outer)	Centaur
Mars-crosser	MBA (middle)	Jupiter trojan	Trans-Neptunian obj.
Unclassified

== 888001–888100 ==
Designation			Discovery			Properties		Ref
Permanent	Provisional	Named after	Date	Site	Discoverer(s)	Category	Diam.	Ref
888001	2007 YJ_{99}	—	December 31, 2007	Kitt Peak	Spacewatch	·	1.1 km	MPC · JPL
888002	2008 AL_{20}	—	January 10, 2008	Mount Lemmon	Mount Lemmon Survey	H	310 m	MPC · JPL
888003	2008 AP_{36}	—	December 30, 2007	Kitt Peak	Spacewatch	·	660 m	MPC · JPL
888004	2008 AV_{37}	—	January 10, 2008	Mount Lemmon	Mount Lemmon Survey	·	540 m	MPC · JPL
888005	2008 AN_{39}	—	January 10, 2008	Mount Lemmon	Mount Lemmon Survey	V	480 m	MPC · JPL
888006	2008 AE_{53}	—	December 14, 2007	Mount Lemmon	Mount Lemmon Survey	·	1.3 km	MPC · JPL
888007	2008 AO_{54}	—	December 31, 2007	Mount Lemmon	Mount Lemmon Survey	·	570 m	MPC · JPL
888008	2008 AT_{71}	—	December 31, 2007	Mount Lemmon	Mount Lemmon Survey	·	730 m	MPC · JPL
888009	2008 AF_{73}	—	January 10, 2008	Kitt Peak	Spacewatch	·	1.4 km	MPC · JPL
888010	2008 AV_{79}	—	January 12, 2008	Kitt Peak	Spacewatch	·	690 m	MPC · JPL
888011	2008 AB_{85}	—	January 13, 2008	Kitt Peak	Spacewatch	·	710 m	MPC · JPL
888012	2008 AT_{86}	—	January 11, 2008	Mount Lemmon	Mount Lemmon Survey	·	1.0 km	MPC · JPL
888013	2008 AF_{91}	—	December 5, 2007	Mount Lemmon	Mount Lemmon Survey	·	1.1 km	MPC · JPL
888014	2008 AH_{97}	—	December 19, 2007	Mount Lemmon	Mount Lemmon Survey	ADE	1.4 km	MPC · JPL
888015	2008 AV_{129}	—	January 11, 2008	Kitt Peak	Spacewatch	·	680 m	MPC · JPL
888016	2008 AO_{130}	—	October 20, 2003	Kitt Peak	Spacewatch	·	660 m	MPC · JPL
888017	2008 AP_{131}	—	January 6, 2008	Mauna Kea	P. A. Wiegert, A. M. Gilbert	·	680 m	MPC · JPL
888018	2008 AL_{142}	—	March 16, 2013	Mount Lemmon	Mount Lemmon Survey	·	1.2 km	MPC · JPL
888019	2008 AH_{145}	—	January 10, 2008	Lulin	LUSS	PHO	690 m	MPC · JPL
888020	2008 AQ_{146}	—	January 11, 2008	Kitt Peak	Spacewatch	·	670 m	MPC · JPL
888021	2008 AP_{148}	—	January 13, 2008	Kitt Peak	Spacewatch	NYS	610 m	MPC · JPL
888022	2008 AA_{149}	—	January 13, 2008	Kitt Peak	Spacewatch	·	1.1 km	MPC · JPL
888023	2008 AF_{152}	—	January 10, 2008	Kitt Peak	Spacewatch	·	830 m	MPC · JPL
888024	2008 AK_{152}	—	January 15, 2008	Mount Lemmon	Mount Lemmon Survey	·	1.9 km	MPC · JPL
888025	2008 AT_{152}	—	January 27, 2011	Mount Lemmon	Mount Lemmon Survey	·	820 m	MPC · JPL
888026	2008 AE_{153}	—	January 11, 2008	Kitt Peak	Spacewatch	·	970 m	MPC · JPL
888027	2008 AH_{155}	—	January 15, 2008	Kitt Peak	Spacewatch	·	1.5 km	MPC · JPL
888028	2008 AK_{156}	—	January 10, 2008	Kitt Peak	Spacewatch	·	670 m	MPC · JPL
888029	2008 AC_{157}	—	January 15, 2008	Mount Lemmon	Mount Lemmon Survey	·	1.4 km	MPC · JPL
888030	2008 AF_{158}	—	October 17, 2010	Mount Lemmon	Mount Lemmon Survey	·	730 m	MPC · JPL
888031	2008 BH_{9}	—	January 16, 2008	Kitt Peak	Spacewatch	·	750 m	MPC · JPL
888032	2008 BA_{25}	—	January 30, 2008	Kitt Peak	Spacewatch	·	1.0 km	MPC · JPL
888033	2008 BF_{50}	—	January 18, 2008	Kitt Peak	Spacewatch	·	710 m	MPC · JPL
888034	2008 BL_{50}	—	January 17, 2008	Kitt Peak	Spacewatch	·	670 m	MPC · JPL
888035	2008 BS_{60}	—	January 18, 2008	Kitt Peak	Spacewatch	·	890 m	MPC · JPL
888036	2008 BX_{60}	—	January 31, 2008	Mount Lemmon	Mount Lemmon Survey	·	1.1 km	MPC · JPL
888037	2008 BJ_{62}	—	January 16, 2008	Kitt Peak	Spacewatch	·	1.1 km	MPC · JPL
888038	2008 CQ_{57}	—	February 7, 2008	Mount Lemmon	Mount Lemmon Survey	·	1.3 km	MPC · JPL
888039	2008 CW_{60}	—	February 7, 2008	Mount Lemmon	Mount Lemmon Survey	·	630 m	MPC · JPL
888040	2008 CX_{73}	—	January 13, 2008	Kitt Peak	Spacewatch	·	1.6 km	MPC · JPL
888041	2008 CV_{74}	—	February 8, 2008	Mount Lemmon	Mount Lemmon Survey	·	1.2 km	MPC · JPL
888042	2008 CS_{86}	—	February 7, 2008	Mount Lemmon	Mount Lemmon Survey	·	730 m	MPC · JPL
888043	2008 CO_{88}	—	February 7, 2008	Mount Lemmon	Mount Lemmon Survey	AEO	780 m	MPC · JPL
888044	2008 CR_{98}	—	February 9, 2008	Kitt Peak	Spacewatch	·	640 m	MPC · JPL
888045	2008 CE_{122}	—	January 13, 2008	Kitt Peak	Spacewatch	ERI	770 m	MPC · JPL
888046	2008 CA_{128}	—	February 8, 2008	Kitt Peak	Spacewatch	·	1.3 km	MPC · JPL
888047	2008 CZ_{136}	—	February 8, 2008	Mount Lemmon	Mount Lemmon Survey	·	1.3 km	MPC · JPL
888048	2008 CX_{140}	—	February 8, 2008	Mount Lemmon	Mount Lemmon Survey	PHO	580 m	MPC · JPL
888049	2008 CV_{144}	—	February 9, 2008	Kitt Peak	Spacewatch	·	1.3 km	MPC · JPL
888050	2008 CP_{147}	—	February 2, 2008	Kitt Peak	Spacewatch	3:2	3.7 km	MPC · JPL
888051	2008 CQ_{147}	—	February 9, 2008	Kitt Peak	Spacewatch	·	740 m	MPC · JPL
888052	2008 CZ_{147}	—	February 9, 2008	Kitt Peak	Spacewatch	ERI	880 m	MPC · JPL
888053	2008 CL_{148}	—	February 9, 2008	Mount Lemmon	Mount Lemmon Survey	·	630 m	MPC · JPL
888054	2008 CF_{149}	—	February 9, 2008	Kitt Peak	Spacewatch	·	680 m	MPC · JPL
888055	2008 CP_{149}	—	February 9, 2008	Kitt Peak	Spacewatch	·	1.5 km	MPC · JPL
888056	2008 CN_{150}	—	February 9, 2008	Kitt Peak	Spacewatch	NYS	660 m	MPC · JPL
888057	2008 CS_{154}	—	February 9, 2008	Kitt Peak	Spacewatch	·	2.1 km	MPC · JPL
888058	2008 CN_{168}	—	February 12, 2008	Kitt Peak	Spacewatch	NYS	710 m	MPC · JPL
888059	2008 CH_{189}	—	January 19, 2008	Mount Lemmon	Mount Lemmon Survey	·	1.4 km	MPC · JPL
888060	2008 CU_{196}	—	February 7, 2008	Kitt Peak	Spacewatch	MAS	540 m	MPC · JPL
888061	2008 CR_{206}	—	February 10, 2008	Kitt Peak	Spacewatch	3:2 · (6124)	3.9 km	MPC · JPL
888062	2008 CF_{221}	—	March 29, 2012	Mount Lemmon	Mount Lemmon Survey	·	700 m	MPC · JPL
888063	2008 CA_{227}	—	February 7, 2008	Kitt Peak	Spacewatch	·	1.2 km	MPC · JPL
888064	2008 CG_{227}	—	February 9, 2008	Kitt Peak	Spacewatch	PHO	520 m	MPC · JPL
888065	2008 CB_{228}	—	February 2, 2008	Kitt Peak	Spacewatch	·	1.2 km	MPC · JPL
888066	2008 CH_{240}	—	February 1, 2008	Kitt Peak	Spacewatch	NYS	690 m	MPC · JPL
888067	2008 CB_{241}	—	February 11, 2008	Mount Lemmon	Mount Lemmon Survey	·	1.4 km	MPC · JPL
888068	2008 CK_{241}	—	February 13, 2008	Kitt Peak	Spacewatch	·	450 m	MPC · JPL
888069	2008 CZ_{243}	—	February 10, 2008	Kitt Peak	Spacewatch	·	1.2 km	MPC · JPL
888070	2008 CP_{245}	—	February 10, 2008	Kitt Peak	Spacewatch	·	640 m	MPC · JPL
888071	2008 CD_{246}	—	February 11, 2008	Mount Lemmon	Mount Lemmon Survey	·	710 m	MPC · JPL
888072	2008 CH_{247}	—	February 7, 2008	Kitt Peak	Spacewatch	·	1.4 km	MPC · JPL
888073	2008 CZ_{247}	—	February 11, 2008	Mount Lemmon	Mount Lemmon Survey	·	760 m	MPC · JPL
888074	2008 CN_{248}	—	February 12, 2008	Mount Lemmon	Mount Lemmon Survey	·	1.2 km	MPC · JPL
888075	2008 CY_{249}	—	February 9, 2008	Kitt Peak	Spacewatch	·	1.5 km	MPC · JPL
888076	2008 CY_{250}	—	February 9, 2008	Mount Lemmon	Mount Lemmon Survey	·	710 m	MPC · JPL
888077	2008 CZ_{250}	—	February 7, 2008	Kitt Peak	Spacewatch	·	790 m	MPC · JPL
888078	2008 DG_{21}	—	February 7, 2008	Mount Lemmon	Mount Lemmon Survey	NYS	650 m	MPC · JPL
888079	2008 DZ_{28}	—	December 30, 2007	Mount Lemmon	Mount Lemmon Survey	·	690 m	MPC · JPL
888080	2008 DV_{44}	—	February 28, 2008	Mount Lemmon	Mount Lemmon Survey	·	1.2 km	MPC · JPL
888081	2008 DR_{59}	—	February 8, 2008	Kitt Peak	Spacewatch	·	1.3 km	MPC · JPL
888082	2008 DF_{60}	—	January 11, 2008	Kitt Peak	Spacewatch	·	750 m	MPC · JPL
888083	2008 DJ_{62}	—	February 28, 2008	Mount Lemmon	Mount Lemmon Survey	AGN	750 m	MPC · JPL
888084	2008 DW_{93}	—	February 27, 2008	Mount Lemmon	Mount Lemmon Survey	·	720 m	MPC · JPL
888085	2008 DM_{95}	—	February 24, 2008	Mount Lemmon	Mount Lemmon Survey	·	640 m	MPC · JPL
888086	2008 DF_{98}	—	February 28, 2008	Mount Lemmon	Mount Lemmon Survey	·	670 m	MPC · JPL
888087	2008 DF_{99}	—	February 26, 2008	Kitt Peak	Spacewatch	H	340 m	MPC · JPL
888088	2008 DM_{99}	—	February 28, 2008	Mount Lemmon	Mount Lemmon Survey	·	1.2 km	MPC · JPL
888089	2008 ED_{2}	—	March 1, 2008	Kitt Peak	Spacewatch	·	1.2 km	MPC · JPL
888090	2008 ER_{34}	—	March 2, 2008	Kitt Peak	Spacewatch	NYS	740 m	MPC · JPL
888091	2008 EF_{35}	—	March 2, 2008	Mount Lemmon	Mount Lemmon Survey	·	720 m	MPC · JPL
888092	2008 EG_{65}	—	March 9, 2008	Mount Lemmon	Mount Lemmon Survey	V	420 m	MPC · JPL
888093	2008 EG_{74}	—	March 7, 2008	Kitt Peak	Spacewatch	·	690 m	MPC · JPL
888094	2008 EG_{102}	—	February 11, 2008	Mount Lemmon	Mount Lemmon Survey	·	1.5 km	MPC · JPL
888095	2008 EN_{117}	—	March 8, 2008	Kitt Peak	Spacewatch	MAS	480 m	MPC · JPL
888096	2008 ES_{138}	—	March 11, 2008	Mount Lemmon	Mount Lemmon Survey	DOR	1.7 km	MPC · JPL
888097	2008 EK_{139}	—	March 11, 2008	Kitt Peak	Spacewatch	·	670 m	MPC · JPL
888098	2008 EF_{155}	—	March 11, 2008	La Silla	Vaduvescu, O., M. Birlan	·	1.3 km	MPC · JPL
888099	2008 ET_{170}	—	February 13, 2008	Kitt Peak	Spacewatch	·	910 m	MPC · JPL
888100	2008 EN_{176}	—	October 11, 2010	Catalina	CSS	·	870 m	MPC · JPL

== 888101–888200 ==
back to top

Designation			Discovery			Properties		Ref
Permanent	Provisional	Named after	Date	Site	Discoverer(s)	Category	Diam.	Ref
888101	2008 EN_{177}	—	March 8, 2008	Mount Lemmon	Mount Lemmon Survey	NYS	620 m	MPC · JPL
888102	2008 ES_{178}	—	September 12, 2015	Haleakala	Pan-STARRS 1	·	1.1 km	MPC · JPL
888103	2008 EE_{179}	—	February 25, 2017	Haleakala	Pan-STARRS 1	·	1.4 km	MPC · JPL
888104	2008 EN_{179}	—	March 4, 2008	Mount Lemmon	Mount Lemmon Survey	·	1.2 km	MPC · JPL
888105	2008 ES_{179}	—	March 4, 2008	Kitt Peak	Spacewatch	·	1.3 km	MPC · JPL
888106	2008 EQ_{181}	—	March 6, 2008	Mount Lemmon	Mount Lemmon Survey	·	750 m	MPC · JPL
888107	2008 ET_{182}	—	March 8, 2008	Mount Lemmon	Mount Lemmon Survey	·	760 m	MPC · JPL
888108	2008 EX_{193}	—	March 8, 2008	Mount Lemmon	Mount Lemmon Survey	H	290 m	MPC · JPL
888109	2008 ET_{196}	—	March 10, 2008	Kitt Peak	Spacewatch	·	680 m	MPC · JPL
888110	2008 FV	—	March 5, 2008	Mount Lemmon	Mount Lemmon Survey	·	1.2 km	MPC · JPL
888111	2008 FR_{4}	—	March 25, 2008	Kitt Peak	Spacewatch	·	740 m	MPC · JPL
888112	2008 FU_{4}	—	February 18, 2008	Mount Lemmon	Mount Lemmon Survey	H	350 m	MPC · JPL
888113	2008 FF_{15}	—	March 26, 2008	Kitt Peak	Spacewatch	·	1.7 km	MPC · JPL
888114	2008 FO_{19}	—	March 8, 2008	Mount Lemmon	Mount Lemmon Survey	AEO	790 m	MPC · JPL
888115	2008 FK_{22}	—	March 27, 2008	Kitt Peak	Spacewatch	·	650 m	MPC · JPL
888116	2008 FH_{23}	—	March 27, 2008	Kitt Peak	Spacewatch	·	1.4 km	MPC · JPL
888117	2008 FK_{34}	—	March 28, 2008	Mount Lemmon	Mount Lemmon Survey	·	1.1 km	MPC · JPL
888118	2008 FJ_{41}	—	March 10, 2008	Kitt Peak	Spacewatch	·	730 m	MPC · JPL
888119	2008 FX_{61}	—	March 1, 2008	Catalina	CSS	PHO	600 m	MPC · JPL
888120	2008 FM_{76}	—	February 26, 2008	Kitt Peak	Spacewatch	ERI	1.0 km	MPC · JPL
888121	2008 FP_{80}	—	March 15, 2008	Mount Lemmon	Mount Lemmon Survey	MAS	430 m	MPC · JPL
888122	2008 FL_{81}	—	March 11, 2008	Kitt Peak	Spacewatch	·	640 m	MPC · JPL
888123	2008 FV_{84}	—	February 28, 2008	Kitt Peak	Spacewatch	·	700 m	MPC · JPL
888124	2008 FS_{86}	—	March 28, 2008	Mount Lemmon	Mount Lemmon Survey	·	640 m	MPC · JPL
888125	2008 FD_{87}	—	March 28, 2008	Mount Lemmon	Mount Lemmon Survey	·	620 m	MPC · JPL
888126	2008 FN_{88}	—	March 28, 2008	Mount Lemmon	Mount Lemmon Survey	·	1.2 km	MPC · JPL
888127	2008 FB_{97}	—	March 29, 2008	Mount Lemmon	Mount Lemmon Survey	·	950 m	MPC · JPL
888128	2008 FR_{107}	—	March 5, 2008	Mount Lemmon	Mount Lemmon Survey	PHO	510 m	MPC · JPL
888129	2008 FX_{120}	—	March 31, 2008	Mount Lemmon	Mount Lemmon Survey	·	1.3 km	MPC · JPL
888130	2008 FX_{128}	—	March 29, 2008	Kitt Peak	Spacewatch	·	1.4 km	MPC · JPL
888131	2008 FX_{145}	—	March 27, 2008	Mount Lemmon	Mount Lemmon Survey	EOS	1.4 km	MPC · JPL
888132	2008 FR_{149}	—	March 29, 2008	Mount Lemmon	Mount Lemmon Survey	AEO	840 m	MPC · JPL
888133	2008 FS_{149}	—	March 26, 2008	Mount Lemmon	Mount Lemmon Survey	ERI	920 m	MPC · JPL
888134	2008 FW_{150}	—	March 27, 2008	Mount Lemmon	Mount Lemmon Survey	3:2	3.1 km	MPC · JPL
888135	2008 GZ_{5}	—	April 1, 2008	Kitt Peak	Spacewatch	·	1.2 km	MPC · JPL
888136	2008 GG_{13}	—	April 3, 2008	Kitt Peak	Spacewatch	H	330 m	MPC · JPL
888137	2008 GW_{15}	—	February 28, 2008	Kitt Peak	Spacewatch	·	1.5 km	MPC · JPL
888138	2008 GN_{18}	—	February 13, 2008	Mount Lemmon	Mount Lemmon Survey	·	720 m	MPC · JPL
888139	2008 GM_{22}	—	April 1, 2008	Mount Lemmon	Mount Lemmon Survey	GEF	790 m	MPC · JPL
888140	2008 GB_{26}	—	April 1, 2008	Mount Lemmon	Mount Lemmon Survey	·	560 m	MPC · JPL
888141	2008 GZ_{28}	—	April 3, 2008	Kitt Peak	Spacewatch	NYS	720 m	MPC · JPL
888142	2008 GL_{57}	—	April 5, 2008	Mount Lemmon	Mount Lemmon Survey	·	1.2 km	MPC · JPL
888143	2008 GG_{74}	—	April 7, 2008	Kitt Peak	Spacewatch	·	570 m	MPC · JPL
888144	2008 GP_{76}	—	April 7, 2008	Kitt Peak	Spacewatch	·	1.4 km	MPC · JPL
888145	2008 GU_{116}	—	April 11, 2008	Mount Lemmon	Mount Lemmon Survey	H	350 m	MPC · JPL
888146	2008 GX_{141}	—	April 15, 2008	Mount Lemmon	Mount Lemmon Survey	·	820 m	MPC · JPL
888147	2008 GK_{156}	—	April 5, 2008	Mount Lemmon	Mount Lemmon Survey	·	1.2 km	MPC · JPL
888148	2008 GY_{161}	—	April 3, 2008	Mount Lemmon	Mount Lemmon Survey	·	570 m	MPC · JPL
888149	2008 GO_{162}	—	April 1, 2008	Mount Lemmon	Mount Lemmon Survey	·	1.4 km	MPC · JPL
888150	2008 GS_{169}	—	April 1, 2008	Mount Lemmon	Mount Lemmon Survey	·	390 m	MPC · JPL
888151	2008 GY_{173}	—	April 9, 2008	Mount Lemmon	Mount Lemmon Survey	·	1.1 km	MPC · JPL
888152	2008 HJ_{15}	—	April 6, 2008	Mount Lemmon	Mount Lemmon Survey	·	1.3 km	MPC · JPL
888153	2008 HO_{35}	—	April 1, 2008	Mount Lemmon	Mount Lemmon Survey	PHO	670 m	MPC · JPL
888154	2008 HA_{43}	—	April 27, 2008	Mount Lemmon	Mount Lemmon Survey	H	300 m	MPC · JPL
888155	2008 HQ_{51}	—	April 14, 2008	Kitt Peak	Spacewatch	NYS	800 m	MPC · JPL
888156	2008 HZ_{62}	—	April 28, 2008	Kitt Peak	Spacewatch	·	1.4 km	MPC · JPL
888157	2008 JT	—	May 1, 2008	Bergisch Gladbach	W. Bickel	·	520 m	MPC · JPL
888158	2008 JJ_{1}	—	April 1, 2008	Kitt Peak	Spacewatch	·	1.3 km	MPC · JPL
888159	2008 JC_{3}	—	April 11, 2008	Kitt Peak	Spacewatch	·	620 m	MPC · JPL
888160	2008 JS_{13}	—	May 6, 2008	Mount Lemmon	Mount Lemmon Survey	H	370 m	MPC · JPL
888161	2008 JO_{43}	—	March 15, 2015	Haleakala	Pan-STARRS 1	PHO	770 m	MPC · JPL
888162	2008 JK_{44}	—	May 14, 2008	Mount Lemmon	Mount Lemmon Survey	PHO	710 m	MPC · JPL
888163	2008 JE_{51}	—	August 9, 2005	Cerro Tololo	Deep Ecliptic Survey	MAS	520 m	MPC · JPL
888164	2008 JX_{51}	—	May 15, 2008	Mount Lemmon	Mount Lemmon Survey	·	1.4 km	MPC · JPL
888165	2008 JQ_{53}	—	May 11, 2008	Kitt Peak	Spacewatch	·	830 m	MPC · JPL
888166	2008 KT_{44}	—	May 29, 2008	Mount Lemmon	Mount Lemmon Survey	·	1.6 km	MPC · JPL
888167	2008 KH_{49}	—	May 27, 2008	Kitt Peak	Spacewatch	EOS	1.5 km	MPC · JPL
888168	2008 MH	—	June 22, 2008	Kitt Peak	Spacewatch	PHO	810 m	MPC · JPL
888169	2008 OL_{33}	—	July 31, 2008	Kitt Peak	Spacewatch	·	950 m	MPC · JPL
888170	2008 PD_{23}	—	August 3, 2008	Siding Spring	SSS	H	380 m	MPC · JPL
888171	2008 QZ_{27}	—	August 30, 2008	La Sagra	OAM	(5)	1.1 km	MPC · JPL
888172	2008 QN_{51}	—	August 20, 2008	Kitt Peak	Spacewatch	(69559)	2.9 km	MPC · JPL
888173	2008 RF_{34}	—	September 2, 2008	Kitt Peak	Spacewatch	·	1.2 km	MPC · JPL
888174	2008 RO_{43}	—	September 2, 2008	Kitt Peak	Spacewatch	·	880 m	MPC · JPL
888175	2008 RU_{50}	—	September 3, 2008	Kitt Peak	Spacewatch	·	530 m	MPC · JPL
888176	2008 RO_{59}	—	July 25, 2008	Mount Lemmon	Mount Lemmon Survey	·	1.0 km	MPC · JPL
888177	2008 RT_{65}	—	September 4, 2008	Kitt Peak	Spacewatch	·	510 m	MPC · JPL
888178	2008 RP_{86}	—	September 5, 2008	Kitt Peak	Spacewatch	EUN	730 m	MPC · JPL
888179	2008 RQ_{90}	—	July 30, 2008	Kitt Peak	Spacewatch	·	390 m	MPC · JPL
888180	2008 RW_{110}	—	September 3, 2008	Kitt Peak	Spacewatch	THM	1.4 km	MPC · JPL
888181	2008 RY_{153}	—	September 5, 2008	Kitt Peak	Spacewatch	·	400 m	MPC · JPL
888182	2008 RU_{159}	—	May 26, 2011	Mount Lemmon	Mount Lemmon Survey	·	450 m	MPC · JPL
888183	2008 RT_{163}	—	September 5, 2008	Kitt Peak	Spacewatch	·	490 m	MPC · JPL
888184	2008 RR_{164}	—	March 25, 2003	Mauna Kea	Mauna Kea	NYS	710 m	MPC · JPL
888185	2008 RQ_{166}	—	September 4, 2008	Kitt Peak	Spacewatch	·	1.5 km	MPC · JPL
888186	2008 RN_{171}	—	September 4, 2008	Kitt Peak	Spacewatch	·	1.4 km	MPC · JPL
888187	2008 RX_{174}	—	September 9, 2008	Mount Lemmon	Mount Lemmon Survey	·	2.0 km	MPC · JPL
888188	2008 RB_{178}	—	September 5, 2008	Kitt Peak	Spacewatch	·	1.0 km	MPC · JPL
888189	2008 RL_{178}	—	September 4, 2008	Kitt Peak	Spacewatch	KOR	1.0 km	MPC · JPL
888190	2008 RK_{181}	—	September 3, 2008	Kitt Peak	Spacewatch	·	910 m	MPC · JPL
888191	2008 RD_{182}	—	September 10, 2008	Kitt Peak	Spacewatch	·	900 m	MPC · JPL
888192	2008 RN_{182}	—	September 6, 2008	Mount Lemmon	Mount Lemmon Survey	·	890 m	MPC · JPL
888193	2008 RS_{183}	—	September 6, 2008	Mount Lemmon	Mount Lemmon Survey	·	920 m	MPC · JPL
888194	2008 SS_{79}	—	September 23, 2008	Mount Lemmon	Mount Lemmon Survey	·	530 m	MPC · JPL
888195	2008 SH_{83}	—	July 29, 2008	Kitt Peak	Spacewatch	·	860 m	MPC · JPL
888196	2008 SZ_{106}	—	September 6, 2008	Mount Lemmon	Mount Lemmon Survey	·	600 m	MPC · JPL
888197	2008 SL_{114}	—	September 22, 2008	Kitt Peak	Spacewatch	·	720 m	MPC · JPL
888198	2008 SQ_{118}	—	September 22, 2008	Mount Lemmon	Mount Lemmon Survey	H	390 m	MPC · JPL
888199	2008 SB_{130}	—	September 7, 2008	Mount Lemmon	Mount Lemmon Survey	·	720 m	MPC · JPL
888200	2008 SL_{136}	—	September 23, 2008	Kitt Peak	Spacewatch	·	1.0 km	MPC · JPL

== 888201–888300 ==
back to top

Designation			Discovery			Properties		Ref
Permanent	Provisional	Named after	Date	Site	Discoverer(s)	Category	Diam.	Ref
888201	2008 SF_{178}	—	September 23, 2008	Kitt Peak	Spacewatch	·	1.7 km	MPC · JPL
888202	2008 SB_{189}	—	September 25, 2008	Kitt Peak	Spacewatch	·	1.0 km	MPC · JPL
888203	2008 SE_{190}	—	September 25, 2008	Kitt Peak	Spacewatch	·	960 m	MPC · JPL
888204	2008 SB_{203}	—	September 26, 2008	Kitt Peak	Spacewatch	·	1.7 km	MPC · JPL
888205	2008 SE_{208}	—	September 27, 2008	Mount Lemmon	Mount Lemmon Survey	TIR	1.5 km	MPC · JPL
888206	2008 ST_{222}	—	September 25, 2008	Mount Lemmon	Mount Lemmon Survey	·	1.9 km	MPC · JPL
888207	2008 SS_{223}	—	September 5, 2008	Kitt Peak	Spacewatch	·	1.1 km	MPC · JPL
888208	2008 SO_{229}	—	September 5, 2008	Kitt Peak	Spacewatch	·	500 m	MPC · JPL
888209	2008 SM_{236}	—	September 21, 2008	Kitt Peak	Spacewatch	·	1.1 km	MPC · JPL
888210	2008 SU_{270}	—	September 25, 2008	Mount Lemmon	Mount Lemmon Survey	·	500 m	MPC · JPL
888211	2008 SW_{283}	—	September 23, 2008	Kitt Peak	Spacewatch	·	700 m	MPC · JPL
888212	2008 SE_{284}	—	September 23, 2008	Kitt Peak	Spacewatch	·	500 m	MPC · JPL
888213	2008 SA_{317}	—	September 23, 2008	Mount Lemmon	Mount Lemmon Survey	·	650 m	MPC · JPL
888214	2008 SG_{318}	—	September 24, 2008	Kitt Peak	Spacewatch	·	1.2 km	MPC · JPL
888215	2008 SJ_{319}	—	September 28, 2008	Mount Lemmon	Mount Lemmon Survey	·	1.2 km	MPC · JPL
888216	2008 SU_{322}	—	September 24, 2008	Kitt Peak	Spacewatch	(5)	630 m	MPC · JPL
888217	2008 SU_{323}	—	September 23, 2008	Mount Lemmon	Mount Lemmon Survey	·	850 m	MPC · JPL
888218	2008 SF_{329}	—	August 15, 2013	Haleakala	Pan-STARRS 1	·	1.7 km	MPC · JPL
888219	2008 SW_{350}	—	September 23, 2008	Kitt Peak	Spacewatch	·	450 m	MPC · JPL
888220	2008 SP_{352}	—	September 23, 2008	Mount Lemmon	Mount Lemmon Survey	·	1.2 km	MPC · JPL
888221	2008 SN_{353}	—	September 29, 2008	Mount Lemmon	Mount Lemmon Survey	·	1.1 km	MPC · JPL
888222	2008 SU_{354}	—	September 21, 2008	Kitt Peak	Spacewatch	·	880 m	MPC · JPL
888223	2008 SV_{354}	—	September 29, 2008	Mount Lemmon	Mount Lemmon Survey	·	1.3 km	MPC · JPL
888224	2008 ST_{357}	—	September 29, 2008	Mount Lemmon	Mount Lemmon Survey	·	780 m	MPC · JPL
888225	2008 SW_{357}	—	September 29, 2008	Mount Lemmon	Mount Lemmon Survey	·	630 m	MPC · JPL
888226	2008 SE_{358}	—	September 24, 2008	Mount Lemmon	Mount Lemmon Survey	·	540 m	MPC · JPL
888227	2008 SB_{362}	—	September 23, 2008	Kitt Peak	Spacewatch	·	480 m	MPC · JPL
888228	2008 SN_{365}	—	September 28, 2008	Mount Lemmon	Mount Lemmon Survey	T_{j} (2.98) · 3:2	2.9 km	MPC · JPL
888229	2008 TK_{8}	—	October 2, 2008	La Sagra	OAM	H	350 m	MPC · JPL
888230	2008 TS_{11}	—	October 1, 2008	Kitt Peak	Spacewatch	·	640 m	MPC · JPL
888231	2008 TO_{23}	—	September 7, 2008	Mount Lemmon	Mount Lemmon Survey	·	730 m	MPC · JPL
888232	2008 TL_{61}	—	October 2, 2008	Kitt Peak	Spacewatch	·	1.5 km	MPC · JPL
888233	2008 TQ_{74}	—	October 1, 2008	Mount Lemmon	Mount Lemmon Survey	·	1.7 km	MPC · JPL
888234	2008 TO_{80}	—	September 24, 2008	Kitt Peak	Spacewatch	·	910 m	MPC · JPL
888235	2008 TY_{99}	—	October 6, 2008	Kitt Peak	Spacewatch	·	920 m	MPC · JPL
888236	2008 TP_{100}	—	October 6, 2008	Kitt Peak	Spacewatch	·	520 m	MPC · JPL
888237	2008 TR_{104}	—	September 22, 2008	Kitt Peak	Spacewatch	·	1.5 km	MPC · JPL
888238	2008 TQ_{121}	—	September 3, 2008	Kitt Peak	Spacewatch	·	990 m	MPC · JPL
888239	2008 TZ_{132}	—	October 8, 2008	Mount Lemmon	Mount Lemmon Survey	·	1.3 km	MPC · JPL
888240	2008 TA_{149}	—	September 23, 2008	Mount Lemmon	Mount Lemmon Survey	·	940 m	MPC · JPL
888241	2008 TP_{161}	—	October 6, 2008	Kitt Peak	Spacewatch	·	1.5 km	MPC · JPL
888242	2008 TE_{200}	—	October 7, 2008	Mount Lemmon	Mount Lemmon Survey	·	880 m	MPC · JPL
888243	2008 TH_{200}	—	October 10, 2008	Mount Lemmon	Mount Lemmon Survey	KON	1.4 km	MPC · JPL
888244	2008 TT_{200}	—	October 9, 2008	Catalina	CSS	·	870 m	MPC · JPL
888245	2008 TV_{203}	—	October 8, 2008	Mount Lemmon	Mount Lemmon Survey	·	2.0 km	MPC · JPL
888246	2008 TL_{209}	—	October 9, 2008	Kitt Peak	Spacewatch	·	1.2 km	MPC · JPL
888247	2008 TY_{214}	—	October 10, 2008	Mount Lemmon	Mount Lemmon Survey	·	1.7 km	MPC · JPL
888248	2008 TR_{217}	—	October 2, 2008	Mount Lemmon	Mount Lemmon Survey	(7744)	860 m	MPC · JPL
888249	2008 TX_{218}	—	October 1, 2008	Kitt Peak	Spacewatch	EOS	1.1 km	MPC · JPL
888250	2008 TP_{222}	—	October 6, 2008	Kitt Peak	Spacewatch	(5)	600 m	MPC · JPL
888251	2008 TX_{228}	—	October 10, 2008	Mount Lemmon	Mount Lemmon Survey	·	1.1 km	MPC · JPL
888252	2008 TD_{229}	—	October 7, 2008	Kitt Peak	Spacewatch	·	910 m	MPC · JPL
888253	2008 TO_{234}	—	October 7, 2008	Mount Lemmon	Mount Lemmon Survey	·	750 m	MPC · JPL
888254	2008 TY_{234}	—	October 9, 2008	Mount Lemmon	Mount Lemmon Survey	EOS	1.2 km	MPC · JPL
888255	2008 TT_{238}	—	October 6, 2008	Kitt Peak	Spacewatch	·	390 m	MPC · JPL
888256	2008 TP_{242}	—	October 9, 2008	Kitt Peak	Spacewatch	3:2	3.4 km	MPC · JPL
888257	2008 UH	—	October 1, 2008	Catalina	CSS	·	790 m	MPC · JPL
888258	2008 UV_{20}	—	October 6, 2008	Kitt Peak	Spacewatch	·	1.2 km	MPC · JPL
888259	2008 UH_{21}	—	October 19, 2008	Kitt Peak	Spacewatch	·	790 m	MPC · JPL
888260	2008 UW_{42}	—	October 20, 2008	Kitt Peak	Spacewatch	·	660 m	MPC · JPL
888261	2008 UG_{70}	—	October 21, 2008	Kitt Peak	Spacewatch	·	720 m	MPC · JPL
888262	2008 UB_{108}	—	October 21, 2008	Kitt Peak	Spacewatch	(5)	790 m	MPC · JPL
888263	2008 UE_{134}	—	October 23, 2008	Kitt Peak	Spacewatch	·	1.2 km	MPC · JPL
888264	2008 UP_{137}	—	September 9, 2008	Mount Lemmon	Mount Lemmon Survey	THM	1.7 km	MPC · JPL
888265	2008 UE_{141}	—	October 23, 2008	Kitt Peak	Spacewatch	·	2.1 km	MPC · JPL
888266	2008 UK_{148}	—	October 23, 2008	Kitt Peak	Spacewatch	·	770 m	MPC · JPL
888267	2008 UB_{153}	—	September 22, 2008	Kitt Peak	Spacewatch	EUP	1.8 km	MPC · JPL
888268	2008 UK_{158}	—	October 23, 2008	Kitt Peak	Spacewatch	·	920 m	MPC · JPL
888269	2008 UJ_{165}	—	October 8, 2008	Mount Lemmon	Mount Lemmon Survey	·	2.4 km	MPC · JPL
888270	2008 UK_{172}	—	October 24, 2008	Kitt Peak	Spacewatch	·	880 m	MPC · JPL
888271	2008 UN_{185}	—	October 24, 2008	Kitt Peak	Spacewatch	·	450 m	MPC · JPL
888272	2008 UL_{195}	—	October 26, 2008	Mount Lemmon	Mount Lemmon Survey	·	1.2 km	MPC · JPL
888273	2008 UF_{206}	—	October 22, 2008	Kitt Peak	Spacewatch	·	1.7 km	MPC · JPL
888274	2008 UQ_{209}	—	October 23, 2008	Kitt Peak	Spacewatch	·	790 m	MPC · JPL
888275	2008 UD_{213}	—	October 19, 2008	Kitt Peak	Spacewatch	·	480 m	MPC · JPL
888276	2008 UP_{220}	—	October 25, 2008	Kitt Peak	Spacewatch	·	1.9 km	MPC · JPL
888277	2008 UO_{221}	—	October 25, 2008	Kitt Peak	Spacewatch	·	620 m	MPC · JPL
888278	2008 UW_{222}	—	September 23, 2008	Mount Lemmon	Mount Lemmon Survey	·	1.4 km	MPC · JPL
888279	2008 UD_{267}	—	September 28, 2008	Mount Lemmon	Mount Lemmon Survey	·	620 m	MPC · JPL
888280	2008 US_{278}	—	October 20, 2008	Kitt Peak	Spacewatch	·	770 m	MPC · JPL
888281	2008 UX_{280}	—	October 28, 2008	Mount Lemmon	Mount Lemmon Survey	(5)	720 m	MPC · JPL
888282	2008 UW_{285}	—	October 28, 2008	Mount Lemmon	Mount Lemmon Survey	·	1.3 km	MPC · JPL
888283	2008 UY_{297}	—	October 29, 2008	Kitt Peak	Spacewatch	·	1.8 km	MPC · JPL
888284	2008 UE_{312}	—	October 30, 2008	Kitt Peak	Spacewatch	·	2.2 km	MPC · JPL
888285	2008 UK_{336}	—	October 21, 2008	Kitt Peak	Spacewatch	·	440 m	MPC · JPL
888286	2008 UC_{337}	—	October 20, 2008	Kitt Peak	Spacewatch	(5)	810 m	MPC · JPL
888287	2008 UD_{338}	—	October 21, 2008	Kitt Peak	Spacewatch	·	2.7 km	MPC · JPL
888288	2008 UM_{349}	—	October 20, 2008	Kitt Peak	Spacewatch	·	790 m	MPC · JPL
888289	2008 US_{356}	—	October 23, 2008	Kitt Peak	Spacewatch	·	570 m	MPC · JPL
888290	2008 UK_{364}	—	October 27, 2008	Catalina	CSS	·	1.3 km	MPC · JPL
888291	2008 UF_{373}	—	October 29, 2008	Kitt Peak	Spacewatch	·	1.2 km	MPC · JPL
888292	2008 UJ_{373}	—	October 22, 2017	Mount Lemmon	Mount Lemmon Survey	·	1.0 km	MPC · JPL
888293	2008 UK_{381}	—	October 21, 2008	Kitt Peak	Spacewatch	·	990 m	MPC · JPL
888294	2008 UV_{383}	—	October 23, 2008	Kitt Peak	Spacewatch	·	420 m	MPC · JPL
888295	2008 UE_{395}	—	October 29, 2008	Mount Lemmon	Mount Lemmon Survey	·	1.2 km	MPC · JPL
888296	2008 UG_{398}	—	October 29, 2008	Kitt Peak	Spacewatch	·	1.7 km	MPC · JPL
888297	2008 UE_{401}	—	February 11, 2016	Haleakala	Pan-STARRS 1	·	2.0 km	MPC · JPL
888298	2008 UG_{402}	—	March 4, 2016	Haleakala	Pan-STARRS 1	·	1.7 km	MPC · JPL
888299	2008 UY_{403}	—	October 25, 2008	Mount Lemmon	Mount Lemmon Survey	·	2.1 km	MPC · JPL
888300	2008 UN_{405}	—	October 29, 2008	Kitt Peak	Spacewatch	·	1.3 km	MPC · JPL

== 888301–888400 ==
back to top

Designation			Discovery			Properties		Ref
Permanent	Provisional	Named after	Date	Site	Discoverer(s)	Category	Diam.	Ref
888301	2008 UZ_{408}	—	October 22, 2008	Kitt Peak	Spacewatch	EUN	600 m	MPC · JPL
888302	2008 UO_{409}	—	October 22, 2008	Kitt Peak	Spacewatch	·	760 m	MPC · JPL
888303	2008 US_{409}	—	October 28, 2008	Mount Lemmon	Mount Lemmon Survey	·	1.8 km	MPC · JPL
888304	2008 UC_{422}	—	October 29, 2008	Mount Lemmon	Mount Lemmon Survey	EUN	690 m	MPC · JPL
888305	2008 UH_{422}	—	October 27, 2008	Mount Lemmon	Mount Lemmon Survey	·	720 m	MPC · JPL
888306	2008 UJ_{424}	—	October 29, 2008	Mount Lemmon	Mount Lemmon Survey	·	680 m	MPC · JPL
888307	2008 UT_{428}	—	October 21, 2008	Kitt Peak	Spacewatch	·	1.9 km	MPC · JPL
888308	2008 VX_{11}	—	November 2, 2008	Mount Lemmon	Mount Lemmon Survey	·	2.3 km	MPC · JPL
888309	2008 VY_{12}	—	November 3, 2008	Mount Lemmon	Mount Lemmon Survey	ADE	1.3 km	MPC · JPL
888310	2008 VK_{13}	—	October 15, 2001	Palomar	NEAT	·	710 m	MPC · JPL
888311	2008 VP_{18}	—	October 20, 2008	Kitt Peak	Spacewatch	(5)	710 m	MPC · JPL
888312	2008 VK_{30}	—	November 2, 2008	Kitt Peak	Spacewatch	·	1.3 km	MPC · JPL
888313	2008 VB_{34}	—	November 2, 2008	Mount Lemmon	Mount Lemmon Survey	KON	1.7 km	MPC · JPL
888314	2008 VP_{72}	—	November 7, 2008	Mount Lemmon	Mount Lemmon Survey	·	1.2 km	MPC · JPL
888315	2008 VB_{88}	—	November 6, 2008	Mount Lemmon	Mount Lemmon Survey	·	1.3 km	MPC · JPL
888316	2008 VX_{88}	—	November 6, 2008	Mount Lemmon	Mount Lemmon Survey	·	430 m	MPC · JPL
888317	2008 VP_{92}	—	November 2, 2008	Mount Lemmon	Mount Lemmon Survey	·	1.6 km	MPC · JPL
888318	2008 VV_{93}	—	November 6, 2008	Kitt Peak	Spacewatch	·	1.4 km	MPC · JPL
888319	2008 VW_{93}	—	November 1, 2008	Kitt Peak	Spacewatch	·	1.7 km	MPC · JPL
888320	2008 VA_{96}	—	November 1, 2008	Mount Lemmon	Mount Lemmon Survey	·	1.4 km	MPC · JPL
888321	2008 VC_{96}	—	November 7, 2008	Mount Lemmon	Mount Lemmon Survey	·	1.4 km	MPC · JPL
888322	2008 VG_{96}	—	November 6, 2008	Kitt Peak	Spacewatch	·	1.6 km	MPC · JPL
888323	2008 VO_{96}	—	November 8, 2008	Mount Lemmon	Mount Lemmon Survey	·	1.0 km	MPC · JPL
888324	2008 VW_{97}	—	November 9, 2008	Kitt Peak	Spacewatch	TIR	1.7 km	MPC · JPL
888325	2008 VC_{98}	—	November 1, 2008	Mount Lemmon	Mount Lemmon Survey	·	400 m	MPC · JPL
888326	2008 VO_{101}	—	November 1, 2008	Mount Lemmon	Mount Lemmon Survey	·	1.5 km	MPC · JPL
888327	2008 VU_{101}	—	November 3, 2008	Kitt Peak	Spacewatch	·	1.5 km	MPC · JPL
888328	2008 VY_{101}	—	November 7, 2008	Mount Lemmon	Mount Lemmon Survey	VER	2.0 km	MPC · JPL
888329	2008 VB_{104}	—	November 2, 2008	Mount Lemmon	Mount Lemmon Survey	(5)	830 m	MPC · JPL
888330	2008 VM_{104}	—	November 1, 2008	Mount Lemmon	Mount Lemmon Survey	·	830 m	MPC · JPL
888331	2008 VY_{107}	—	October 31, 2008	Kitt Peak	Spacewatch	HNS	1 km	MPC · JPL
888332	2008 VE_{108}	—	November 7, 2008	Mount Lemmon	Mount Lemmon Survey	·	800 m	MPC · JPL
888333	2008 VQ_{109}	—	November 2, 2008	Kitt Peak	Spacewatch	·	1.0 km	MPC · JPL
888334	2008 VD_{110}	—	November 7, 2008	Mount Lemmon	Mount Lemmon Survey	T_{j} (2.98) · 3:2	4.1 km	MPC · JPL
888335	2008 VY_{111}	—	November 9, 2008	Mount Lemmon	Mount Lemmon Survey	·	610 m	MPC · JPL
888336	2008 WJ_{4}	—	October 9, 2008	Kitt Peak	Spacewatch	·	400 m	MPC · JPL
888337	2008 WY_{5}	—	October 1, 2008	Kitt Peak	Spacewatch	·	480 m	MPC · JPL
888338	2008 WY_{28}	—	November 1, 2008	Mount Lemmon	Mount Lemmon Survey	·	470 m	MPC · JPL
888339	2008 WV_{30}	—	November 19, 2008	Mount Lemmon	Mount Lemmon Survey	NYS	750 m	MPC · JPL
888340	2008 WJ_{43}	—	November 17, 2008	Kitt Peak	Spacewatch	H	380 m	MPC · JPL
888341	2008 WW_{49}	—	September 22, 2008	Mount Lemmon	Mount Lemmon Survey	·	760 m	MPC · JPL
888342	2008 WT_{50}	—	November 9, 2008	Kitt Peak	Spacewatch	·	1.4 km	MPC · JPL
888343	2008 WS_{65}	—	November 1, 2008	Mount Lemmon	Mount Lemmon Survey	·	1.9 km	MPC · JPL
888344	2008 WS_{85}	—	November 20, 2008	Kitt Peak	Spacewatch	·	2.2 km	MPC · JPL
888345	2008 WL_{108}	—	September 27, 2008	Mount Lemmon	Mount Lemmon Survey	·	800 m	MPC · JPL
888346	2008 WF_{117}	—	November 23, 2008	La Sagra	LINEAR	T_{j} (2.89)	1.8 km	MPC · JPL
888347	2008 WA_{144}	—	November 20, 2008	Mount Lemmon	Mount Lemmon Survey	·	830 m	MPC · JPL
888348	2008 WO_{156}	—	November 19, 2008	Kitt Peak	Spacewatch	LIX	2.1 km	MPC · JPL
888349	2008 WG_{160}	—	November 21, 2008	Mount Lemmon	Mount Lemmon Survey	H	440 m	MPC · JPL
888350	2008 WP_{161}	—	November 30, 2008	Mount Lemmon	Mount Lemmon Survey	·	2.1 km	MPC · JPL
888351	2008 WA_{162}	—	November 19, 2008	Kitt Peak	Spacewatch	(5)	660 m	MPC · JPL
888352	2008 WD_{162}	—	November 24, 2008	Kitt Peak	Spacewatch	(5)	800 m	MPC · JPL
888353	2008 WM_{163}	—	November 20, 2008	Mount Lemmon	Mount Lemmon Survey	EOS	1.2 km	MPC · JPL
888354	2008 WK_{164}	—	November 22, 2008	Kitt Peak	Spacewatch	·	1.8 km	MPC · JPL
888355	2008 WQ_{166}	—	November 19, 2008	Kitt Peak	Spacewatch	EUP	2.2 km	MPC · JPL
888356	2008 WR_{166}	—	November 19, 2008	Kitt Peak	Spacewatch	·	700 m	MPC · JPL
888357	2008 WD_{168}	—	November 19, 2008	Kitt Peak	Spacewatch	EOS	1.5 km	MPC · JPL
888358	2008 WT_{168}	—	November 17, 2008	Kitt Peak	Spacewatch	·	770 m	MPC · JPL
888359	2008 WB_{169}	—	November 18, 2008	Kitt Peak	Spacewatch	·	1.8 km	MPC · JPL
888360	2008 XL_{3}	—	December 7, 2008	Mount Lemmon	Mount Lemmon Survey	BAR	790 m	MPC · JPL
888361	2008 XP_{6}	—	December 4, 2008	Socorro	LINEAR	·	630 m	MPC · JPL
888362	2008 XT_{7}	—	October 25, 2008	Socorro	LINEAR	·	1.0 km	MPC · JPL
888363	2008 XV_{10}	—	December 1, 2008	Catalina	CSS	·	1.2 km	MPC · JPL
888364	2008 XN_{25}	—	December 4, 2008	Mount Lemmon	Mount Lemmon Survey	·	850 m	MPC · JPL
888365	2008 XM_{28}	—	December 4, 2008	Mount Lemmon	Mount Lemmon Survey	·	2.0 km	MPC · JPL
888366	2008 XC_{30}	—	November 1, 2008	Kitt Peak	Spacewatch	JUN	610 m	MPC · JPL
888367	2008 XK_{31}	—	November 19, 2008	Kitt Peak	Spacewatch	·	560 m	MPC · JPL
888368	2008 XK_{37}	—	December 2, 2008	Kitt Peak	Spacewatch	·	890 m	MPC · JPL
888369	2008 XD_{39}	—	December 2, 2008	Kitt Peak	Spacewatch	·	900 m	MPC · JPL
888370	2008 XN_{54}	—	December 2, 2008	Kitt Peak	Spacewatch	·	1.5 km	MPC · JPL
888371	2008 XD_{61}	—	December 5, 2008	Kitt Peak	Spacewatch	·	1.0 km	MPC · JPL
888372	2008 XZ_{64}	—	January 17, 2015	Mount Lemmon	Mount Lemmon Survey	·	1.9 km	MPC · JPL
888373	2008 XV_{65}	—	December 1, 2008	Kitt Peak	Spacewatch	·	1.4 km	MPC · JPL
888374	2008 XC_{66}	—	December 5, 2008	Kitt Peak	Spacewatch	·	1.2 km	MPC · JPL
888375	2008 XQ_{66}	—	December 1, 2008	Kitt Peak	Spacewatch	·	1.9 km	MPC · JPL
888376	2008 XK_{67}	—	December 3, 2008	Mount Lemmon	Mount Lemmon Survey	(5)	640 m	MPC · JPL
888377	2008 XE_{68}	—	December 2, 2008	Mount Lemmon	Mount Lemmon Survey	·	2.3 km	MPC · JPL
888378	2008 XS_{68}	—	December 8, 2008	Mount Lemmon	Mount Lemmon Survey	·	790 m	MPC · JPL
888379	2008 XY_{69}	—	December 5, 2008	Mount Lemmon	Mount Lemmon Survey	THB	1.7 km	MPC · JPL
888380	2008 XB_{70}	—	December 2, 2008	Kitt Peak	Spacewatch	·	810 m	MPC · JPL
888381	2008 XN_{70}	—	December 5, 2008	Kitt Peak	Spacewatch	·	670 m	MPC · JPL
888382	2008 XZ_{70}	—	December 7, 2008	Mount Lemmon	Mount Lemmon Survey	·	1.9 km	MPC · JPL
888383	2008 YP	—	December 19, 2008	Calar Alto	F. Hormuth	·	810 m	MPC · JPL
888384	2008 YU_{5}	—	December 21, 2008	La Sagra	OAM	PHO	780 m	MPC · JPL
888385	2008 YY_{11}	—	December 4, 2008	Kitt Peak	Spacewatch	BRG	930 m	MPC · JPL
888386	2008 YV_{17}	—	December 21, 2008	Mount Lemmon	Mount Lemmon Survey	·	2.2 km	MPC · JPL
888387	2008 YM_{19}	—	January 15, 2005	Bergisch Gladbach	W. Bickel	·	800 m	MPC · JPL
888388	2008 YW_{39}	—	December 29, 2008	Mount Lemmon	Mount Lemmon Survey	(5)	780 m	MPC · JPL
888389	2008 YS_{44}	—	November 20, 2008	Mount Lemmon	Mount Lemmon Survey	·	890 m	MPC · JPL
888390	2008 YT_{45}	—	December 29, 2008	Mount Lemmon	Mount Lemmon Survey	·	940 m	MPC · JPL
888391	2008 YN_{55}	—	December 29, 2008	Kitt Peak	Spacewatch	·	440 m	MPC · JPL
888392	2008 YV_{55}	—	December 30, 2008	Kitt Peak	Spacewatch	·	570 m	MPC · JPL
888393	2008 YT_{60}	—	December 30, 2008	Mount Lemmon	Mount Lemmon Survey	(5)	720 m	MPC · JPL
888394	2008 YN_{63}	—	December 30, 2008	Mount Lemmon	Mount Lemmon Survey	·	470 m	MPC · JPL
888395	2008 YR_{68}	—	December 31, 2008	Mount Lemmon	Mount Lemmon Survey	TIR	1.6 km	MPC · JPL
888396	2008 YZ_{69}	—	December 29, 2008	Mount Lemmon	Mount Lemmon Survey	VER	2.0 km	MPC · JPL
888397	2008 YT_{78}	—	December 30, 2008	Mount Lemmon	Mount Lemmon Survey	(5)	910 m	MPC · JPL
888398	2008 YN_{82}	—	December 31, 2008	Kitt Peak	Spacewatch	EOS	1.4 km	MPC · JPL
888399	2008 YR_{82}	—	December 5, 2008	Mount Lemmon	Mount Lemmon Survey	THB	1.7 km	MPC · JPL
888400	2008 YD_{93}	—	December 29, 2008	Kitt Peak	Spacewatch	·	520 m	MPC · JPL

== 888401–888500 ==
back to top

Designation			Discovery			Properties		Ref
Permanent	Provisional	Named after	Date	Site	Discoverer(s)	Category	Diam.	Ref
888401	2008 YG_{94}	—	December 21, 2008	Mount Lemmon	Mount Lemmon Survey	·	1.8 km	MPC · JPL
888402	2008 YO_{94}	—	December 21, 2008	Mount Lemmon	Mount Lemmon Survey	·	1.7 km	MPC · JPL
888403	2008 YE_{98}	—	December 29, 2008	Mount Lemmon	Mount Lemmon Survey	·	1.1 km	MPC · JPL
888404	2008 YP_{98}	—	December 29, 2008	Kitt Peak	Spacewatch	·	2.0 km	MPC · JPL
888405	2008 YY_{102}	—	December 29, 2008	Kitt Peak	Spacewatch	·	1.9 km	MPC · JPL
888406	2008 YB_{107}	—	December 29, 2008	Kitt Peak	Spacewatch	·	2.4 km	MPC · JPL
888407	2008 YH_{129}	—	December 31, 2008	Kitt Peak	Spacewatch	·	1.4 km	MPC · JPL
888408	2008 YR_{131}	—	November 20, 2008	Mount Lemmon	Mount Lemmon Survey	HYG	1.6 km	MPC · JPL
888409	2008 YH_{145}	—	December 30, 2008	Kitt Peak	Spacewatch	TIR	1.9 km	MPC · JPL
888410	2008 YO_{155}	—	December 22, 2008	Kitt Peak	Spacewatch	·	2.0 km	MPC · JPL
888411	2008 YT_{167}	—	December 22, 2008	Kitt Peak	Spacewatch	·	1.0 km	MPC · JPL
888412	2008 YL_{176}	—	December 18, 2015	Mount Lemmon	Mount Lemmon Survey	·	510 m	MPC · JPL
888413	2008 YF_{179}	—	December 22, 2008	Mount Lemmon	Mount Lemmon Survey	·	400 m	MPC · JPL
888414	2008 YW_{179}	—	December 31, 2008	Kitt Peak	Spacewatch	·	2.3 km	MPC · JPL
888415	2008 YH_{181}	—	December 21, 2008	Kitt Peak	Spacewatch	(5)	820 m	MPC · JPL
888416	2008 YJ_{184}	—	December 21, 2008	Kitt Peak	Spacewatch	·	430 m	MPC · JPL
888417	2008 YU_{184}	—	December 24, 2011	Mount Lemmon	Mount Lemmon Survey	H	350 m	MPC · JPL
888418	2008 YB_{187}	—	December 22, 2008	Mount Lemmon	Mount Lemmon Survey	·	460 m	MPC · JPL
888419	2008 YL_{187}	—	December 22, 2008	Kitt Peak	Spacewatch	·	2.1 km	MPC · JPL
888420	2008 YZ_{188}	—	December 31, 2008	Kitt Peak	Spacewatch	EOS	1.3 km	MPC · JPL
888421	2008 YD_{191}	—	December 21, 2008	Kitt Peak	Spacewatch	·	840 m	MPC · JPL
888422	2008 YP_{192}	—	December 30, 2008	Mount Lemmon	Mount Lemmon Survey	·	900 m	MPC · JPL
888423	2008 YS_{192}	—	December 30, 2008	Kitt Peak	Spacewatch	·	2.1 km	MPC · JPL
888424	2008 YT_{192}	—	December 31, 2008	Kitt Peak	Spacewatch	·	2.1 km	MPC · JPL
888425	2008 YA_{193}	—	December 22, 2008	Kitt Peak	Spacewatch	T_{j} (2.98)	2.2 km	MPC · JPL
888426	2008 YN_{194}	—	December 22, 2008	Mount Lemmon	Mount Lemmon Survey	·	890 m	MPC · JPL
888427	2008 YW_{194}	—	December 22, 2008	Kitt Peak	Spacewatch	·	790 m	MPC · JPL
888428	2008 YJ_{195}	—	December 31, 2008	Mount Lemmon	Mount Lemmon Survey	·	1.7 km	MPC · JPL
888429	2008 YK_{195}	—	December 30, 2008	Kitt Peak	Spacewatch	THM	1.6 km	MPC · JPL
888430	2008 YC_{196}	—	December 31, 2008	Kitt Peak	Spacewatch	·	2.0 km	MPC · JPL
888431	2008 YF_{196}	—	December 30, 2008	Mount Lemmon	Mount Lemmon Survey	·	480 m	MPC · JPL
888432	2008 YG_{196}	—	December 22, 2008	Kitt Peak	Spacewatch	·	870 m	MPC · JPL
888433	2008 YQ_{197}	—	December 29, 2008	Kitt Peak	Spacewatch	·	2.1 km	MPC · JPL
888434	2008 YQ_{198}	—	December 22, 2008	Kitt Peak	Spacewatch	·	1.5 km	MPC · JPL
888435	2008 YS_{198}	—	December 31, 2008	Kitt Peak	Spacewatch	·	1.9 km	MPC · JPL
888436	2008 YV_{198}	—	October 4, 2007	Mount Lemmon	Mount Lemmon Survey	·	1.6 km	MPC · JPL
888437	2008 YC_{199}	—	December 30, 2008	Kitt Peak	Spacewatch	T_{j} (2.95)	2.9 km	MPC · JPL
888438	2008 YE_{199}	—	December 31, 2008	Kitt Peak	Spacewatch	·	1.8 km	MPC · JPL
888439	2009 AT_{5}	—	January 1, 2009	Kitt Peak	Spacewatch	·	2.3 km	MPC · JPL
888440	2009 AD_{6}	—	January 1, 2009	Kitt Peak	Spacewatch	·	1.7 km	MPC · JPL
888441	2009 AE_{6}	—	January 1, 2009	Kitt Peak	Spacewatch	·	2.2 km	MPC · JPL
888442	2009 AY_{6}	—	January 1, 2009	Kitt Peak	Spacewatch	·	940 m	MPC · JPL
888443	2009 AP_{19}	—	January 2, 2009	Mount Lemmon	Mount Lemmon Survey	·	470 m	MPC · JPL
888444	2009 AP_{28}	—	December 21, 2008	Mount Lemmon	Mount Lemmon Survey	·	940 m	MPC · JPL
888445	2009 AL_{38}	—	January 2, 2009	Kitt Peak	Spacewatch	·	1.6 km	MPC · JPL
888446	2009 AN_{40}	—	January 15, 2009	Kitt Peak	Spacewatch	·	1.8 km	MPC · JPL
888447	2009 AN_{45}	—	January 15, 2009	Kitt Peak	Spacewatch	MAS	540 m	MPC · JPL
888448	2009 AE_{52}	—	January 1, 2009	Kitt Peak	Spacewatch	LIX	2.1 km	MPC · JPL
888449	2009 AK_{53}	—	February 4, 2016	Haleakala	Pan-STARRS 1	·	420 m	MPC · JPL
888450	2009 AK_{54}	—	September 24, 2011	Haleakala	Pan-STARRS 1	·	540 m	MPC · JPL
888451	2009 AS_{54}	—	January 3, 2009	Mount Lemmon	Mount Lemmon Survey	EUN	780 m	MPC · JPL
888452	2009 AG_{57}	—	January 2, 2009	Mount Lemmon	Mount Lemmon Survey	·	1.3 km	MPC · JPL
888453	2009 AO_{57}	—	January 3, 2009	Kitt Peak	Spacewatch	·	440 m	MPC · JPL
888454	2009 AZ_{59}	—	January 1, 2009	Kitt Peak	Spacewatch	·	2.0 km	MPC · JPL
888455	2009 AK_{60}	—	January 1, 2009	Kitt Peak	Spacewatch	·	860 m	MPC · JPL
888456	2009 AZ_{60}	—	January 3, 2009	Mount Lemmon	Mount Lemmon Survey	·	1.9 km	MPC · JPL
888457	2009 AL_{61}	—	January 1, 2009	Kitt Peak	Spacewatch	·	960 m	MPC · JPL
888458	2009 AM_{61}	—	January 15, 2009	Kitt Peak	Spacewatch	·	2.2 km	MPC · JPL
888459	2009 AT_{61}	—	January 1, 2009	Kitt Peak	Spacewatch	·	1.6 km	MPC · JPL
888460	2009 AD_{62}	—	January 1, 2009	Kitt Peak	Spacewatch	·	830 m	MPC · JPL
888461	2009 AX_{62}	—	January 2, 2009	Catalina	CSS	H	280 m	MPC · JPL
888462	2009 AC_{63}	—	January 2, 2009	Kitt Peak	Spacewatch	·	2.0 km	MPC · JPL
888463	2009 AQ_{63}	—	January 1, 2009	Mount Lemmon	Mount Lemmon Survey	LIX	1.9 km	MPC · JPL
888464	2009 AR_{64}	—	January 3, 2009	Kitt Peak	Spacewatch	THM	1.4 km	MPC · JPL
888465	2009 AO_{65}	—	January 7, 2009	Kitt Peak	Spacewatch	HNS	850 m	MPC · JPL
888466	2009 AK_{66}	—	January 1, 2009	Kitt Peak	Spacewatch	·	2.1 km	MPC · JPL
888467	2009 BF_{18}	—	January 16, 2009	Kitt Peak	Spacewatch	·	1.8 km	MPC · JPL
888468	2009 BE_{26}	—	December 31, 2008	Kitt Peak	Spacewatch	·	2.1 km	MPC · JPL
888469	2009 BF_{26}	—	January 2, 2009	Kitt Peak	Spacewatch	(5)	780 m	MPC · JPL
888470	2009 BP_{26}	—	January 16, 2009	Kitt Peak	Spacewatch	KON	1.6 km	MPC · JPL
888471	2009 BR_{28}	—	January 2, 2009	Kitt Peak	Spacewatch	TIR	1.7 km	MPC · JPL
888472	2009 BZ_{30}	—	January 16, 2009	Kitt Peak	Spacewatch	·	470 m	MPC · JPL
888473	2009 BG_{34}	—	January 16, 2009	Kitt Peak	Spacewatch	·	2.3 km	MPC · JPL
888474	2009 BO_{38}	—	January 16, 2009	Kitt Peak	Spacewatch	·	2.0 km	MPC · JPL
888475	2009 BZ_{56}	—	December 31, 2008	Mount Lemmon	Mount Lemmon Survey	·	1.9 km	MPC · JPL
888476	2009 BS_{70}	—	January 25, 2009	Catalina	CSS	·	840 m	MPC · JPL
888477	2009 BH_{88}	—	May 8, 2006	Mount Lemmon	Mount Lemmon Survey	·	510 m	MPC · JPL
888478	2009 BR_{117}	—	January 29, 2009	Mount Lemmon	Mount Lemmon Survey	PHO	630 m	MPC · JPL
888479	2009 BF_{118}	—	December 1, 2008	Mount Lemmon	Mount Lemmon Survey	(895)	2.1 km	MPC · JPL
888480	2009 BQ_{119}	—	January 20, 2009	Kitt Peak	Spacewatch	·	2.1 km	MPC · JPL
888481	2009 BZ_{122}	—	January 17, 2009	Kitt Peak	Spacewatch	LIX	2.3 km	MPC · JPL
888482	2009 BX_{131}	—	January 30, 2009	Mount Lemmon	Mount Lemmon Survey	·	880 m	MPC · JPL
888483	2009 BK_{138}	—	January 29, 2009	Kitt Peak	Spacewatch	·	660 m	MPC · JPL
888484	2009 BP_{138}	—	January 29, 2009	Kitt Peak	Spacewatch	·	1.4 km	MPC · JPL
888485	2009 BO_{139}	—	January 29, 2009	Kitt Peak	Spacewatch	·	1.9 km	MPC · JPL
888486	2009 BC_{140}	—	January 29, 2009	Kitt Peak	Spacewatch	·	900 m	MPC · JPL
888487	2009 BM_{144}	—	January 30, 2009	Kitt Peak	Spacewatch	·	390 m	MPC · JPL
888488	2009 BR_{144}	—	January 30, 2009	Kitt Peak	Spacewatch	·	1.1 km	MPC · JPL
888489	2009 BO_{146}	—	December 30, 2008	Mount Lemmon	Mount Lemmon Survey	·	1.4 km	MPC · JPL
888490	2009 BA_{155}	—	January 31, 2009	Kitt Peak	Spacewatch	T_{j} (2.97) · EUP	2.4 km	MPC · JPL
888491	2009 BM_{155}	—	January 31, 2009	Kitt Peak	Spacewatch	·	1.1 km	MPC · JPL
888492	2009 BJ_{163}	—	January 31, 2009	Kitt Peak	Spacewatch	·	1.9 km	MPC · JPL
888493	2009 BK_{170}	—	January 16, 2009	Kitt Peak	Spacewatch	·	800 m	MPC · JPL
888494	2009 BJ_{175}	—	January 28, 2009	Kitt Peak	Spacewatch	T_{j} (2.98)	1.9 km	MPC · JPL
888495	2009 BX_{186}	—	January 25, 2009	Kitt Peak	Spacewatch	·	1.1 km	MPC · JPL
888496	2009 BK_{187}	—	January 30, 2009	Kitt Peak	Spacewatch	·	800 m	MPC · JPL
888497	2009 BL_{188}	—	January 25, 2009	Kitt Peak	Spacewatch	MAS	570 m	MPC · JPL
888498	2009 BX_{194}	—	April 30, 2014	Haleakala	Pan-STARRS 1	·	830 m	MPC · JPL
888499	2009 BZ_{194}	—	January 20, 2009	Catalina	CSS	·	600 m	MPC · JPL
888500	2009 BZ_{195}	—	January 26, 2009	Mount Lemmon	Mount Lemmon Survey	·	960 m	MPC · JPL

== 888501–888600 ==
back to top

Designation			Discovery			Properties		Ref
Permanent	Provisional	Named after	Date	Site	Discoverer(s)	Category	Diam.	Ref
888501	2009 BO_{201}	—	January 20, 2009	Kitt Peak	Spacewatch	T_{j} (2.98) · EUP	2.6 km	MPC · JPL
888502	2009 BG_{202}	—	March 2, 2016	Haleakala	Pan-STARRS 1	·	460 m	MPC · JPL
888503	2009 BV_{202}	—	January 31, 2009	Mount Lemmon	Mount Lemmon Survey	·	440 m	MPC · JPL
888504	2009 BQ_{203}	—	March 17, 2015	Kitt Peak	Spacewatch	·	1.8 km	MPC · JPL
888505	2009 BZ_{206}	—	January 16, 2009	Kitt Peak	Spacewatch	·	2.1 km	MPC · JPL
888506	2009 BG_{207}	—	January 18, 2009	Kitt Peak	Spacewatch	LIX	2.1 km	MPC · JPL
888507	2009 BE_{210}	—	January 30, 2009	Kitt Peak	Spacewatch	·	1.1 km	MPC · JPL
888508	2009 BN_{211}	—	January 17, 2009	Kitt Peak	Spacewatch	THB	1.9 km	MPC · JPL
888509	2009 BV_{211}	—	January 18, 2009	Kitt Peak	Spacewatch	(69559)	1.6 km	MPC · JPL
888510	2009 BF_{212}	—	January 31, 2009	Kitt Peak	Spacewatch	THM	1.6 km	MPC · JPL
888511	2009 BH_{212}	—	January 20, 2009	Kitt Peak	Spacewatch	THM	1.4 km	MPC · JPL
888512	2009 BJ_{214}	—	January 20, 2009	Kitt Peak	Spacewatch	·	950 m	MPC · JPL
888513	2009 BX_{214}	—	January 25, 2009	Kitt Peak	Spacewatch	HNS	740 m	MPC · JPL
888514	2009 BP_{215}	—	January 25, 2009	Kitt Peak	Spacewatch	·	540 m	MPC · JPL
888515	2009 BC_{216}	—	April 30, 2005	Kitt Peak	Spacewatch	·	1.2 km	MPC · JPL
888516	2009 BD_{216}	—	January 31, 2009	Mount Lemmon	Mount Lemmon Survey	(1547)	890 m	MPC · JPL
888517	2009 BF_{216}	—	January 16, 2009	Kitt Peak	Spacewatch	·	1.0 km	MPC · JPL
888518	2009 BB_{217}	—	January 20, 2009	Mount Lemmon	Mount Lemmon Survey	·	720 m	MPC · JPL
888519	2009 BB_{218}	—	January 25, 2009	Kitt Peak	Spacewatch	·	2.3 km	MPC · JPL
888520	2009 CX_{9}	—	February 1, 2009	Mount Lemmon	Mount Lemmon Survey	·	1.8 km	MPC · JPL
888521	2009 CR_{16}	—	February 1, 2009	Mount Lemmon	Mount Lemmon Survey	HYG	2.0 km	MPC · JPL
888522	2009 CD_{22}	—	January 18, 2009	Mount Lemmon	Mount Lemmon Survey	·	1.7 km	MPC · JPL
888523	2009 CE_{33}	—	February 1, 2009	Kitt Peak	Spacewatch	·	1.8 km	MPC · JPL
888524	2009 CF_{36}	—	February 2, 2009	Mount Lemmon	Mount Lemmon Survey	·	2.4 km	MPC · JPL
888525	2009 CV_{63}	—	February 1, 2009	Kitt Peak	Spacewatch	HNS	640 m	MPC · JPL
888526	2009 CA_{64}	—	February 1, 2009	Kitt Peak	Spacewatch	THM	1.7 km	MPC · JPL
888527	2009 CG_{64}	—	February 3, 2009	Kitt Peak	Spacewatch	MAS	560 m	MPC · JPL
888528	2009 CU_{71}	—	February 2, 2009	Kitt Peak	Spacewatch	·	1.2 km	MPC · JPL
888529	2009 CJ_{72}	—	October 26, 2011	Haleakala	Pan-STARRS 1	·	470 m	MPC · JPL
888530	2009 CT_{73}	—	July 25, 2014	Haleakala	Pan-STARRS 1	·	460 m	MPC · JPL
888531	2009 CW_{73}	—	February 1, 2009	Kitt Peak	Spacewatch	·	970 m	MPC · JPL
888532	2009 CW_{74}	—	February 1, 2009	Mount Lemmon	Mount Lemmon Survey	·	1.8 km	MPC · JPL
888533	2009 CE_{77}	—	February 2, 2009	Kitt Peak	Spacewatch	·	1.1 km	MPC · JPL
888534	2009 CP_{77}	—	February 1, 2009	Kitt Peak	Spacewatch	·	1.5 km	MPC · JPL
888535	2009 CL_{79}	—	February 3, 2009	Kitt Peak	Spacewatch	·	1.0 km	MPC · JPL
888536	2009 DE	—	February 16, 2009	Calar Alto	F. Hormuth, J. C. Dotson	·	1.1 km	MPC · JPL
888537	2009 DB_{18}	—	January 31, 2009	Kitt Peak	Spacewatch	JUN	560 m	MPC · JPL
888538	2009 DH_{23}	—	February 19, 2009	Kitt Peak	Spacewatch	·	730 m	MPC · JPL
888539	2009 DK_{31}	—	February 19, 2009	Kitt Peak	Spacewatch	PHO	470 m	MPC · JPL
888540	2009 DG_{35}	—	February 20, 2009	Kitt Peak	Spacewatch	·	970 m	MPC · JPL
888541	2009 DD_{52}	—	January 1, 2009	Mount Lemmon	Mount Lemmon Survey	TIR	1.7 km	MPC · JPL
888542	2009 DY_{52}	—	February 22, 2009	Kitt Peak	Spacewatch	·	470 m	MPC · JPL
888543	2009 DD_{53}	—	January 25, 2009	Kitt Peak	Spacewatch	·	1.8 km	MPC · JPL
888544	2009 DT_{62}	—	January 18, 2009	Mount Lemmon	Mount Lemmon Survey	JUN	770 m	MPC · JPL
888545	2009 DN_{68}	—	February 21, 2009	Mount Lemmon	Mount Lemmon Survey	·	1.9 km	MPC · JPL
888546	2009 DY_{76}	—	February 21, 2009	Mount Lemmon	Mount Lemmon Survey	·	730 m	MPC · JPL
888547	2009 DR_{80}	—	February 22, 2009	Kitt Peak	Spacewatch	·	1.1 km	MPC · JPL
888548	2009 DW_{87}	—	February 27, 2009	Kitt Peak	Spacewatch	·	1.9 km	MPC · JPL
888549	2009 DD_{93}	—	February 22, 2009	Kitt Peak	Spacewatch	·	1.1 km	MPC · JPL
888550	2009 DZ_{96}	—	February 1, 2009	Mount Lemmon	Mount Lemmon Survey	·	880 m	MPC · JPL
888551	2009 DG_{98}	—	February 26, 2009	Kitt Peak	Spacewatch	·	930 m	MPC · JPL
888552	2009 DK_{106}	—	February 2, 2009	Kitt Peak	Spacewatch	·	530 m	MPC · JPL
888553	2009 DW_{108}	—	February 24, 2009	Mount Lemmon	Mount Lemmon Survey	EUN	800 m	MPC · JPL
888554	2009 DO_{114}	—	February 25, 2009	Calar Alto	F. Hormuth	ADE	1.2 km	MPC · JPL
888555	2009 DE_{119}	—	February 27, 2009	Kitt Peak	Spacewatch	·	710 m	MPC · JPL
888556	2009 DM_{121}	—	January 25, 2009	Kitt Peak	Spacewatch	·	460 m	MPC · JPL
888557	2009 DB_{122}	—	February 27, 2009	Kitt Peak	Spacewatch	·	2.2 km	MPC · JPL
888558	2009 DO_{126}	—	February 20, 2009	Kitt Peak	Spacewatch	·	440 m	MPC · JPL
888559	2009 DC_{132}	—	February 20, 2009	Mount Lemmon	Mount Lemmon Survey	·	2.1 km	MPC · JPL
888560	2009 DE_{134}	—	February 28, 2009	Kitt Peak	Spacewatch	·	490 m	MPC · JPL
888561	2009 DS_{137}	—	February 3, 2009	Kitt Peak	Spacewatch	·	730 m	MPC · JPL
888562	2009 DC_{138}	—	February 19, 2009	Kitt Peak	Spacewatch	PHO	650 m	MPC · JPL
888563	2009 DL_{147}	—	February 26, 2009	Kitt Peak	Spacewatch	PHO	650 m	MPC · JPL
888564	2009 DU_{151}	—	August 1, 2017	Haleakala	Pan-STARRS 1	·	490 m	MPC · JPL
888565	2009 DG_{152}	—	February 21, 2009	Kitt Peak	Spacewatch	·	460 m	MPC · JPL
888566	2009 DU_{152}	—	February 21, 2009	Kitt Peak	Spacewatch	THB	1.9 km	MPC · JPL
888567	2009 DK_{154}	—	February 28, 2009	Mount Lemmon	Mount Lemmon Survey	·	1.8 km	MPC · JPL
888568	2009 DB_{157}	—	February 20, 2009	Kitt Peak	Spacewatch	(895)	2.2 km	MPC · JPL
888569	2009 DP_{157}	—	February 26, 2009	Kitt Peak	Spacewatch	LIX	2.1 km	MPC · JPL
888570	2009 DB_{158}	—	February 26, 2009	Kitt Peak	Spacewatch	·	840 m	MPC · JPL
888571	2009 DR_{160}	—	February 22, 2009	Kitt Peak	Spacewatch	EUN	800 m	MPC · JPL
888572	2009 DY_{160}	—	March 12, 2016	Haleakala	Pan-STARRS 1	PHO	510 m	MPC · JPL
888573	2009 DZ_{160}	—	February 5, 2016	Haleakala	Pan-STARRS 1	·	470 m	MPC · JPL
888574	2009 DC_{161}	—	February 20, 2009	Mount Lemmon	Mount Lemmon Survey	(1547)	980 m	MPC · JPL
888575	2009 DW_{161}	—	December 20, 2004	Mount Lemmon	Mount Lemmon Survey	·	1.1 km	MPC · JPL
888576	2009 EL	—	March 2, 2009	Kitt Peak	Spacewatch	·	850 m	MPC · JPL
888577	2009 ET_{1}	—	March 1, 2009	Kitt Peak	Spacewatch	EUP	2.3 km	MPC · JPL
888578	2009 EG_{4}	—	February 20, 2009	Kitt Peak	Spacewatch	·	1.1 km	MPC · JPL
888579	2009 EH_{11}	—	March 2, 2009	Mount Lemmon	Mount Lemmon Survey	·	1.1 km	MPC · JPL
888580	2009 ES_{17}	—	February 19, 2009	Catalina	CSS	PHO	550 m	MPC · JPL
888581	2009 EQ_{36}	—	June 2, 2018	Mount Lemmon	Mount Lemmon Survey	RAF	710 m	MPC · JPL
888582	2009 EW_{39}	—	March 3, 2009	Kitt Peak	Spacewatch	·	420 m	MPC · JPL
888583	2009 EO_{41}	—	March 3, 2009	Mount Lemmon	Mount Lemmon Survey	·	1.9 km	MPC · JPL
888584	2009 EU_{42}	—	March 1, 2009	Kitt Peak	Spacewatch	·	930 m	MPC · JPL
888585	2009 EE_{44}	—	March 3, 2009	Kitt Peak	Spacewatch	·	1.1 km	MPC · JPL
888586	2009 FE_{13}	—	April 6, 2005	Mount Lemmon	Mount Lemmon Survey	·	1.1 km	MPC · JPL
888587	2009 FL_{23}	—	March 21, 2009	Kitt Peak	Spacewatch	·	900 m	MPC · JPL
888588	2009 FK_{27}	—	February 28, 2009	Kitt Peak	Spacewatch	·	1.2 km	MPC · JPL
888589	2009 FJ_{52}	—	September 28, 2006	Kitt Peak	Spacewatch	·	1.6 km	MPC · JPL
888590	2009 FX_{67}	—	March 24, 2009	Mount Lemmon	Mount Lemmon Survey	·	2.6 km	MPC · JPL
888591	2009 FB_{69}	—	March 16, 2009	Kitt Peak	Spacewatch	·	950 m	MPC · JPL
888592	2009 FY_{69}	—	March 18, 2009	Kitt Peak	Spacewatch	·	1.3 km	MPC · JPL
888593	2009 FR_{83}	—	March 28, 2009	Kitt Peak	Spacewatch	·	510 m	MPC · JPL
888594	2009 FJ_{84}	—	July 12, 2013	Haleakala	Pan-STARRS 1	·	480 m	MPC · JPL
888595	2009 FW_{85}	—	March 27, 2009	Mount Lemmon	Mount Lemmon Survey	T_{j} (2.92)	2.2 km	MPC · JPL
888596	2009 FK_{93}	—	March 31, 2009	Kitt Peak	Spacewatch	·	970 m	MPC · JPL
888597	2009 FV_{93}	—	March 21, 2009	Mount Lemmon	Mount Lemmon Survey	(194)	1.1 km	MPC · JPL
888598	2009 FX_{95}	—	March 31, 2009	Kitt Peak	Spacewatch	·	1.4 km	MPC · JPL
888599	2009 FC_{97}	—	March 17, 2009	Kitt Peak	Spacewatch	·	480 m	MPC · JPL
888600	2009 GF_{5}	—	April 1, 2009	Kitt Peak	Spacewatch	·	2.1 km	MPC · JPL

== 888601–888700 ==
back to top

Designation			Discovery			Properties		Ref
Permanent	Provisional	Named after	Date	Site	Discoverer(s)	Category	Diam.	Ref
888601	2009 GC_{9}	—	April 2, 2009	Kitt Peak	Spacewatch	(2076)	520 m	MPC · JPL
888602	2009 HP_{18}	—	April 19, 2009	Mount Lemmon	Mount Lemmon Survey	·	1.3 km	MPC · JPL
888603	2009 HK_{22}	—	March 29, 2009	Mount Lemmon	Mount Lemmon Survey	·	500 m	MPC · JPL
888604	2009 HA_{41}	—	April 20, 2009	Kitt Peak	Spacewatch	·	2.2 km	MPC · JPL
888605	2009 HW_{50}	—	April 21, 2009	Kitt Peak	Spacewatch	·	2.0 km	MPC · JPL
888606	2009 HO_{52}	—	April 17, 2009	Catalina	CSS	·	1.2 km	MPC · JPL
888607	2009 HM_{64}	—	April 22, 2009	Mount Lemmon	Mount Lemmon Survey	·	1.2 km	MPC · JPL
888608	2009 HO_{68}	—	March 22, 2009	Mount Lemmon	Mount Lemmon Survey	·	390 m	MPC · JPL
888609	2009 HN_{74}	—	February 26, 2009	Mount Lemmon	Mount Lemmon Survey	·	790 m	MPC · JPL
888610	2009 HA_{77}	—	April 28, 2009	Catalina	CSS	·	1.2 km	MPC · JPL
888611	2009 HG_{78}	—	March 31, 2009	Kitt Peak	Spacewatch	·	2.1 km	MPC · JPL
888612	2009 HN_{82}	—	March 25, 2009	Mount Lemmon	Mount Lemmon Survey	·	1.2 km	MPC · JPL
888613	2009 HZ_{95}	—	April 20, 2009	Mount Lemmon	Mount Lemmon Survey	·	1.0 km	MPC · JPL
888614	2009 HG_{107}	—	April 12, 2016	Haleakala	Pan-STARRS 1	·	430 m	MPC · JPL
888615	2009 HE_{122}	—	April 20, 2009	Mount Lemmon	Mount Lemmon Survey	·	2.2 km	MPC · JPL
888616	2009 HM_{123}	—	April 22, 2009	Mount Lemmon	Mount Lemmon Survey	·	530 m	MPC · JPL
888617	2009 HZ_{123}	—	April 22, 2009	Kitt Peak	Spacewatch	·	560 m	MPC · JPL
888618	2009 HY_{127}	—	April 17, 2009	Mount Lemmon	Mount Lemmon Survey	·	1.2 km	MPC · JPL
888619	2009 HA_{129}	—	April 27, 2009	Kitt Peak	Spacewatch	·	940 m	MPC · JPL
888620	2009 HV_{130}	—	April 22, 2009	Mauna Kea	P. A. Wiegert	·	1.1 km	MPC · JPL
888621	2009 JT_{5}	—	April 19, 2009	Catalina	CSS	·	1.5 km	MPC · JPL
888622	2009 JY_{22}	—	May 1, 2009	Mount Lemmon	Mount Lemmon Survey	THB	2.0 km	MPC · JPL
888623	2009 JO_{23}	—	May 1, 2009	Mount Lemmon	Mount Lemmon Survey	·	570 m	MPC · JPL
888624	2009 JC_{24}	—	May 14, 2009	Mount Lemmon	Mount Lemmon Survey	T_{j} (2.98)	2.4 km	MPC · JPL
888625	2009 KQ_{4}	—	December 30, 2008	Catalina	CSS	AMO	270 m	MPC · JPL
888626	2009 KF_{6}	—	April 17, 2009	Kitt Peak	Spacewatch	·	940 m	MPC · JPL
888627	2009 KO_{13}	—	May 17, 2009	Kitt Peak	Spacewatch	·	1.2 km	MPC · JPL
888628	2009 KS_{44}	—	May 16, 2009	Mount Lemmon	Mount Lemmon Survey	·	1.3 km	MPC · JPL
888629	2009 LG_{4}	—	May 24, 2009	Mount Lemmon	Mount Lemmon Survey	T_{j} (2.99) · EUP	2.4 km	MPC · JPL
888630	2009 QU_{12}	—	August 16, 2009	Kitt Peak	Spacewatch	·	890 m	MPC · JPL
888631	2009 QR_{69}	—	July 17, 2016	Haleakala	Pan-STARRS 1	·	560 m	MPC · JPL
888632	2009 QX_{78}	—	August 29, 2009	Kitt Peak	Spacewatch	·	670 m	MPC · JPL
888633	2009 RP_{22}	—	September 15, 2009	Kitt Peak	Spacewatch	H	290 m	MPC · JPL
888634	2009 RN_{24}	—	September 15, 2009	Kitt Peak	Spacewatch	·	1.5 km	MPC · JPL
888635	2009 RM_{81}	—	September 15, 2009	Kitt Peak	Spacewatch	·	820 m	MPC · JPL
888636	2009 SO_{13}	—	August 20, 2009	Kitt Peak	Spacewatch	·	1.2 km	MPC · JPL
888637	2009 ST_{23}	—	August 27, 2009	Kitt Peak	Spacewatch	AGN	760 m	MPC · JPL
888638	2009 SR_{48}	—	September 16, 2009	Kitt Peak	Spacewatch	·	1.5 km	MPC · JPL
888639	2009 SY_{54}	—	November 15, 2006	Kitt Peak	Spacewatch	·	380 m	MPC · JPL
888640	2009 SH_{71}	—	August 29, 2009	Kitt Peak	Spacewatch	·	900 m	MPC · JPL
888641	2009 SS_{107}	—	September 16, 2009	Kitt Peak	Spacewatch	SYL	3.1 km	MPC · JPL
888642	2009 SV_{112}	—	August 6, 2005	Palomar	NEAT	·	960 m	MPC · JPL
888643	2009 SP_{138}	—	September 18, 2009	Kitt Peak	Spacewatch	(5)	740 m	MPC · JPL
888644	2009 SJ_{159}	—	September 20, 2009	Kitt Peak	Spacewatch	·	1.2 km	MPC · JPL
888645	2009 SM_{226}	—	September 26, 2009	Kitt Peak	Spacewatch	·	1.5 km	MPC · JPL
888646	2009 SY_{256}	—	September 21, 2009	Mount Lemmon	Mount Lemmon Survey	L4	5.7 km	MPC · JPL
888647	2009 ST_{264}	—	September 23, 2009	Mount Lemmon	Mount Lemmon Survey	NYS	1.0 km	MPC · JPL
888648	2009 SC_{301}	—	September 16, 2009	Mount Lemmon	Mount Lemmon Survey	V	390 m	MPC · JPL
888649	2009 SE_{310}	—	September 18, 2009	Kitt Peak	Spacewatch	V	490 m	MPC · JPL
888650	2009 SJ_{329}	—	September 16, 2009	Mount Lemmon	Mount Lemmon Survey	·	1.6 km	MPC · JPL
888651	2009 SD_{380}	—	January 14, 2011	Mount Lemmon	Mount Lemmon Survey	·	1.3 km	MPC · JPL
888652	2009 SU_{391}	—	August 27, 2014	Haleakala	Pan-STARRS 1	·	1.2 km	MPC · JPL
888653	2009 ST_{393}	—	September 27, 2009	Kitt Peak	Spacewatch	·	470 m	MPC · JPL
888654	2009 SZ_{401}	—	September 21, 2009	Mount Lemmon	Mount Lemmon Survey	THM	1.7 km	MPC · JPL
888655	2009 TC_{8}	—	October 14, 2009	Mount Lemmon	Mount Lemmon Survey	APO · PHA	600 m	MPC · JPL
888656	2009 TB_{45}	—	October 9, 2009	Catalina	CSS	·	1.4 km	MPC · JPL
888657	2009 TA_{46}	—	October 12, 2009	Mount Lemmon	Mount Lemmon Survey	·	1.3 km	MPC · JPL
888658	2009 TD_{48}	—	October 2, 2009	Mount Lemmon	Mount Lemmon Survey	NYS	930 m	MPC · JPL
888659	2009 TB_{50}	—	October 14, 2009	Mount Lemmon	Mount Lemmon Survey	THM	1.6 km	MPC · JPL
888660	2009 TZ_{54}	—	October 14, 2009	Mount Lemmon	Mount Lemmon Survey	·	710 m	MPC · JPL
888661	2009 UF_{15}	—	September 27, 2009	Kitt Peak	Spacewatch	·	450 m	MPC · JPL
888662	2009 UL_{48}	—	October 22, 2009	Mount Lemmon	Mount Lemmon Survey	·	890 m	MPC · JPL
888663	2009 UX_{52}	—	October 22, 2009	Mount Lemmon	Mount Lemmon Survey	(5)	560 m	MPC · JPL
888664	2009 UC_{115}	—	October 21, 2009	Mount Lemmon	Mount Lemmon Survey	·	810 m	MPC · JPL
888665	2009 UE_{120}	—	September 29, 2009	Mount Lemmon	Mount Lemmon Survey	H	310 m	MPC · JPL
888666	2009 UQ_{142}	—	October 18, 2009	Mount Lemmon	Mount Lemmon Survey	·	1.3 km	MPC · JPL
888667	2009 UH_{160}	—	October 23, 2009	Kitt Peak	Spacewatch	·	860 m	MPC · JPL
888668	2009 UH_{163}	—	October 18, 2009	Mount Lemmon	Mount Lemmon Survey	·	700 m	MPC · JPL
888669	2009 UP_{163}	—	October 26, 2009	Mount Lemmon	Mount Lemmon Survey	·	950 m	MPC · JPL
888670	2009 UF_{164}	—	October 16, 2009	Mount Lemmon	Mount Lemmon Survey	(5)	550 m	MPC · JPL
888671	2009 UT_{168}	—	September 16, 2009	Mount Lemmon	Mount Lemmon Survey	H	320 m	MPC · JPL
888672	2009 UW_{172}	—	October 14, 2014	Mount Lemmon	Mount Lemmon Survey	·	1.1 km	MPC · JPL
888673	2009 UN_{174}	—	October 22, 2009	Mount Lemmon	Mount Lemmon Survey	3:2	3.2 km	MPC · JPL
888674	2009 UD_{177}	—	September 22, 2009	Mount Lemmon	Mount Lemmon Survey	·	1.7 km	MPC · JPL
888675	2009 UK_{177}	—	October 16, 2009	Mount Lemmon	Mount Lemmon Survey	(5)	650 m	MPC · JPL
888676	2009 UL_{179}	—	October 27, 2009	Mount Lemmon	Mount Lemmon Survey	·	1.0 km	MPC · JPL
888677	2009 UZ_{184}	—	October 16, 2009	Mount Lemmon	Mount Lemmon Survey	H	280 m	MPC · JPL
888678	2009 UU_{189}	—	October 16, 2009	Mount Lemmon	Mount Lemmon Survey	L4	6.3 km	MPC · JPL
888679	2009 UX_{189}	—	October 18, 2009	Mount Lemmon	Mount Lemmon Survey	L4	5.4 km	MPC · JPL
888680	2009 UX_{196}	—	October 24, 2009	Kitt Peak	Spacewatch	·	910 m	MPC · JPL
888681	2009 VK_{43}	—	November 11, 2009	Kitt Peak	Spacewatch	·	750 m	MPC · JPL
888682	2009 VS_{59}	—	November 9, 2009	Catalina	CSS	H	380 m	MPC · JPL
888683	2009 VY_{79}	—	September 21, 2009	Mount Lemmon	Mount Lemmon Survey	·	1.2 km	MPC · JPL
888684	2009 VZ_{81}	—	November 8, 2009	Kitt Peak	Spacewatch	·	2.2 km	MPC · JPL
888685	2009 VP_{96}	—	October 17, 2009	Mount Lemmon	Mount Lemmon Survey	·	1.5 km	MPC · JPL
888686	2009 VV_{120}	—	November 9, 2009	Kitt Peak	Spacewatch	·	530 m	MPC · JPL
888687	2009 VF_{121}	—	November 10, 2009	Kitt Peak	Spacewatch	·	740 m	MPC · JPL
888688	2009 VL_{126}	—	November 9, 2009	Kitt Peak	Spacewatch	·	490 m	MPC · JPL
888689	2009 VU_{127}	—	November 10, 2009	Kitt Peak	Spacewatch	·	1.6 km	MPC · JPL
888690	2009 VQ_{130}	—	November 8, 2009	Kitt Peak	Spacewatch	EUP	2.8 km	MPC · JPL
888691	2009 VH_{133}	—	November 10, 2009	Mount Lemmon	Mount Lemmon Survey	H	310 m	MPC · JPL
888692	2009 WP_{11}	—	September 28, 2009	Kitt Peak	Spacewatch	·	1.4 km	MPC · JPL
888693	2009 WM_{54}	—	November 16, 2009	Mount Lemmon	Mount Lemmon Survey	·	1.4 km	MPC · JPL
888694	2009 WC_{79}	—	November 18, 2009	Mount Lemmon	Mount Lemmon Survey	·	1.3 km	MPC · JPL
888695	2009 WN_{102}	—	November 22, 2009	Catalina	CSS	H	350 m	MPC · JPL
888696	2009 WE_{120}	—	November 20, 2009	Kitt Peak	Spacewatch	·	620 m	MPC · JPL
888697	2009 WX_{120}	—	October 21, 2009	Mount Lemmon	Mount Lemmon Survey	·	1.2 km	MPC · JPL
888698	2009 WH_{126}	—	November 20, 2009	Kitt Peak	Spacewatch	·	1.4 km	MPC · JPL
888699	2009 WX_{126}	—	November 20, 2009	Kitt Peak	Spacewatch	·	680 m	MPC · JPL
888700	2009 WM_{142}	—	November 19, 2009	Kitt Peak	Spacewatch	H	400 m	MPC · JPL

== 888701–888800 ==
back to top

Designation			Discovery			Properties		Ref
Permanent	Provisional	Named after	Date	Site	Discoverer(s)	Category	Diam.	Ref
888701	2009 WZ_{146}	—	November 19, 2009	Mount Lemmon	Mount Lemmon Survey	·	1.6 km	MPC · JPL
888702	2009 WS_{155}	—	November 20, 2009	Kitt Peak	Spacewatch	·	410 m	MPC · JPL
888703	2009 WS_{165}	—	November 21, 2009	Kitt Peak	Spacewatch	·	1.7 km	MPC · JPL
888704	2009 WZ_{174}	—	October 24, 2009	Kitt Peak	Spacewatch	·	790 m	MPC · JPL
888705	2009 WL_{195}	—	October 26, 2009	Kitt Peak	Spacewatch	·	520 m	MPC · JPL
888706	2009 WL_{211}	—	November 18, 2009	Kitt Peak	Spacewatch	·	1.0 km	MPC · JPL
888707	2009 WF_{212}	—	November 18, 2009	Kitt Peak	Spacewatch	·	650 m	MPC · JPL
888708	2009 WP_{218}	—	October 2, 2009	Mount Lemmon	Mount Lemmon Survey	H	330 m	MPC · JPL
888709	2009 WS_{230}	—	November 17, 2009	Kitt Peak	Spacewatch	·	470 m	MPC · JPL
888710	2009 WE_{234}	—	October 15, 2009	La Sagra	OAM	PHO	920 m	MPC · JPL
888711	2009 WT_{249}	—	October 22, 2009	Mount Lemmon	Mount Lemmon Survey	·	1.4 km	MPC · JPL
888712	2009 WC_{253}	—	November 27, 2009	Kitt Peak	Spacewatch	H	410 m	MPC · JPL
888713	2009 WW_{254}	—	November 18, 2009	Mount Lemmon	Mount Lemmon Survey	·	1.2 km	MPC · JPL
888714	2009 WA_{255}	—	September 20, 2009	Mount Lemmon	Mount Lemmon Survey	·	530 m	MPC · JPL
888715	2009 WA_{277}	—	November 21, 2009	Mount Lemmon	Mount Lemmon Survey	·	2.4 km	MPC · JPL
888716	2009 WE_{278}	—	November 22, 2009	Kitt Peak	Spacewatch	PHO	810 m	MPC · JPL
888717	2009 WC_{286}	—	November 23, 2014	Haleakala	Pan-STARRS 1	·	2.1 km	MPC · JPL
888718	2009 WE_{286}	—	October 29, 2014	Haleakala	Pan-STARRS 1	·	1.3 km	MPC · JPL
888719	2009 WX_{288}	—	November 22, 2009	Kitt Peak	Spacewatch	·	900 m	MPC · JPL
888720	2009 WK_{293}	—	November 17, 2009	Mount Lemmon	Mount Lemmon Survey	·	1.9 km	MPC · JPL
888721	2009 WQ_{299}	—	November 20, 2009	Mount Lemmon	Mount Lemmon Survey	THM	1.6 km	MPC · JPL
888722	2009 XT_{1}	—	December 10, 2009	La Sagra	OAM	H	460 m	MPC · JPL
888723	2009 XW_{12}	—	December 11, 2009	Catalina	CSS	H	500 m	MPC · JPL
888724	2009 XZ_{28}	—	December 10, 2009	Mount Lemmon	Mount Lemmon Survey	·	980 m	MPC · JPL
888725	2009 YJ_{8}	—	December 16, 2009	Mount Lemmon	Mount Lemmon Survey	·	1.3 km	MPC · JPL
888726	2009 YN_{11}	—	December 30, 2005	Kitt Peak	Spacewatch	·	940 m	MPC · JPL
888727	2009 YY_{11}	—	December 18, 2009	Kitt Peak	Spacewatch	·	1.5 km	MPC · JPL
888728	2009 YQ_{14}	—	December 18, 2009	Mount Lemmon	Mount Lemmon Survey	·	1.3 km	MPC · JPL
888729	2009 YV_{27}	—	December 19, 2009	Kitt Peak	Spacewatch	H	300 m	MPC · JPL
888730	2009 YA_{30}	—	July 14, 2016	Haleakala	Pan-STARRS 1	·	810 m	MPC · JPL
888731	2009 YV_{32}	—	December 19, 2009	Mount Lemmon	Mount Lemmon Survey	·	1.3 km	MPC · JPL
888732	2009 YB_{34}	—	December 27, 2009	Kitt Peak	Spacewatch	·	1.7 km	MPC · JPL
888733	2009 YQ_{35}	—	January 5, 2006	Mount Lemmon	Mount Lemmon Survey	·	900 m	MPC · JPL
888734	2010 AT_{7}	—	January 6, 2010	Kitt Peak	Spacewatch	·	430 m	MPC · JPL
888735	2010 AS_{14}	—	January 7, 2010	Mount Lemmon	Mount Lemmon Survey	·	1.6 km	MPC · JPL
888736	2010 AV_{23}	—	January 6, 2010	Kitt Peak	Spacewatch	·	1.5 km	MPC · JPL
888737	2010 AD_{35}	—	January 7, 2010	Kitt Peak	Spacewatch	·	760 m	MPC · JPL
888738	2010 AN_{38}	—	January 8, 2010	Kitt Peak	Spacewatch	·	1.0 km	MPC · JPL
888739	2010 AQ_{47}	—	January 8, 2010	Kitt Peak	Spacewatch	·	1.8 km	MPC · JPL
888740	2010 AW_{65}	—	January 11, 2010	Kitt Peak	Spacewatch	·	1.6 km	MPC · JPL
888741	2010 AB_{145}	—	March 12, 2010	Kitt Peak	Spacewatch	·	1.5 km	MPC · JPL
888742	2010 AO_{147}	—	August 28, 2014	Haleakala	Pan-STARRS 1	·	1.7 km	MPC · JPL
888743	2010 AV_{156}	—	January 11, 2010	Kitt Peak	Spacewatch	H	270 m	MPC · JPL
888744	2010 AZ_{156}	—	January 8, 2010	Mount Lemmon	Mount Lemmon Survey	·	1.5 km	MPC · JPL
888745	2010 AD_{159}	—	November 2, 2013	Kitt Peak	Spacewatch	·	690 m	MPC · JPL
888746	2010 AA_{160}	—	January 12, 2010	Kitt Peak	Spacewatch	·	2.0 km	MPC · JPL
888747	2010 AL_{163}	—	January 8, 2010	Mount Lemmon	Mount Lemmon Survey	·	2.1 km	MPC · JPL
888748	2010 AO_{163}	—	January 8, 2010	Mount Lemmon	Mount Lemmon Survey	·	1.2 km	MPC · JPL
888749	2010 AN_{164}	—	January 7, 2010	Kitt Peak	Spacewatch	·	1.5 km	MPC · JPL
888750	2010 BT_{4}	—	December 18, 2009	Kitt Peak	Spacewatch	·	2.1 km	MPC · JPL
888751	2010 CC_{30}	—	February 9, 2010	Mount Lemmon	Mount Lemmon Survey	·	1.1 km	MPC · JPL
888752	2010 CG_{38}	—	February 13, 2010	Mount Lemmon	Mount Lemmon Survey	NYS	530 m	MPC · JPL
888753	2010 CV_{41}	—	December 18, 2009	Mount Lemmon	Mount Lemmon Survey	·	1.8 km	MPC · JPL
888754	2010 CA_{59}	—	February 9, 2010	Catalina	CSS	H	390 m	MPC · JPL
888755	2010 CF_{62}	—	February 9, 2010	Kitt Peak	Spacewatch	·	560 m	MPC · JPL
888756	2010 CN_{63}	—	February 9, 2010	Kitt Peak	Spacewatch	H	310 m	MPC · JPL
888757	2010 CK_{64}	—	February 9, 2010	Mount Lemmon	Mount Lemmon Survey	EOS	1.2 km	MPC · JPL
888758	2010 CB_{74}	—	February 13, 2010	Mount Lemmon	Mount Lemmon Survey	·	1.4 km	MPC · JPL
888759	2010 CC_{83}	—	February 14, 2010	Mount Lemmon	Mount Lemmon Survey	H	340 m	MPC · JPL
888760	2010 CC_{87}	—	February 14, 2010	Catalina	CSS	H	360 m	MPC · JPL
888761	2010 CX_{89}	—	February 14, 2010	Mount Lemmon	Mount Lemmon Survey	·	720 m	MPC · JPL
888762	2010 CM_{92}	—	February 14, 2010	Kitt Peak	Spacewatch	·	640 m	MPC · JPL
888763	2010 CR_{96}	—	February 14, 2010	Mount Lemmon	Mount Lemmon Survey	·	1.4 km	MPC · JPL
888764	2010 CK_{104}	—	February 14, 2010	Mount Lemmon	Mount Lemmon Survey	·	1.9 km	MPC · JPL
888765	2010 CR_{106}	—	February 14, 2010	Mount Lemmon	Mount Lemmon Survey	·	730 m	MPC · JPL
888766	2010 CF_{107}	—	February 14, 2010	Mount Lemmon	Mount Lemmon Survey	THM	1.7 km	MPC · JPL
888767	2010 CK_{107}	—	February 14, 2010	Mount Lemmon	Mount Lemmon Survey	·	1.4 km	MPC · JPL
888768	2010 CL_{110}	—	February 14, 2010	Mount Lemmon	Mount Lemmon Survey	·	680 m	MPC · JPL
888769	2010 CZ_{113}	—	February 14, 2010	Mount Lemmon	Mount Lemmon Survey	·	1.1 km	MPC · JPL
888770	2010 CH_{118}	—	February 15, 2010	Kitt Peak	Spacewatch	·	1.4 km	MPC · JPL
888771	2010 CP_{119}	—	February 15, 2010	Kitt Peak	Spacewatch	(5)	890 m	MPC · JPL
888772	2010 CU_{124}	—	March 16, 2005	Kitt Peak	Spacewatch	·	1.2 km	MPC · JPL
888773	2010 CD_{144}	—	February 9, 2010	Mount Lemmon	Mount Lemmon Survey	H	330 m	MPC · JPL
888774	2010 CT_{155}	—	February 15, 2010	Kitt Peak	Spacewatch	TIR	1.8 km	MPC · JPL
888775	2010 CE_{268}	—	February 14, 2010	WISE	WISE	(895)	2.6 km	MPC · JPL
888776	2010 CW_{272}	—	November 20, 2014	Haleakala	Pan-STARRS 1	·	2.0 km	MPC · JPL
888777	2010 CG_{273}	—	August 24, 2011	Haleakala	Pan-STARRS 1	H	300 m	MPC · JPL
888778	2010 DW_{36}	—	February 16, 2010	Kitt Peak	Spacewatch	·	550 m	MPC · JPL
888779	2010 DZ_{37}	—	February 16, 2010	Mount Lemmon	Mount Lemmon Survey	NYS	470 m	MPC · JPL
888780	2010 DD_{48}	—	February 17, 2010	Mount Lemmon	Mount Lemmon Survey	·	1.5 km	MPC · JPL
888781	2010 DJ_{112}	—	February 16, 2010	Mount Lemmon	Mount Lemmon Survey	·	460 m	MPC · JPL
888782	2010 DM_{112}	—	February 17, 2010	Mount Lemmon	Mount Lemmon Survey	·	1.3 km	MPC · JPL
888783	2010 DB_{114}	—	February 17, 2010	Kitt Peak	Spacewatch	·	1.5 km	MPC · JPL
888784	2010 DM_{115}	—	February 18, 2010	Mount Lemmon	Mount Lemmon Survey	·	730 m	MPC · JPL
888785	2010 DR_{115}	—	February 17, 2010	Kitt Peak	Spacewatch	·	1.7 km	MPC · JPL
888786	2010 DP_{116}	—	February 17, 2010	Kitt Peak	Spacewatch	·	500 m	MPC · JPL
888787	2010 DR_{116}	—	February 17, 2010	Kitt Peak	Spacewatch	·	1.2 km	MPC · JPL
888788	2010 DT_{116}	—	January 22, 2015	Haleakala	Pan-STARRS 1	·	1.9 km	MPC · JPL
888789	2010 EA_{41}	—	March 4, 2010	Kitt Peak	Spacewatch	·	1.4 km	MPC · JPL
888790	2010 EM_{74}	—	February 14, 2010	Kitt Peak	Spacewatch	·	2.2 km	MPC · JPL
888791	2010 EH_{77}	—	March 12, 2010	Kitt Peak	Spacewatch	·	2.2 km	MPC · JPL
888792	2010 EN_{79}	—	February 19, 2010	Mount Lemmon	Mount Lemmon Survey	·	530 m	MPC · JPL
888793	2010 EG_{87}	—	March 13, 2010	Kitt Peak	Spacewatch	·	1.9 km	MPC · JPL
888794	2010 EK_{96}	—	March 14, 2010	Mount Lemmon	Mount Lemmon Survey	·	420 m	MPC · JPL
888795	2010 EJ_{97}	—	March 14, 2010	Mount Lemmon	Mount Lemmon Survey	·	660 m	MPC · JPL
888796	2010 ES_{103}	—	March 15, 2010	Mount Lemmon	Mount Lemmon Survey	·	2.1 km	MPC · JPL
888797	2010 EH_{130}	—	March 13, 2010	Kitt Peak	Spacewatch	·	2.4 km	MPC · JPL
888798	2010 ES_{172}	—	February 13, 2010	Mount Lemmon	Mount Lemmon Survey	·	1.4 km	MPC · JPL
888799	2010 EY_{188}	—	April 16, 2016	Haleakala	Pan-STARRS 1	·	1.8 km	MPC · JPL
888800	2010 EA_{189}	—	March 14, 2010	Kitt Peak	Spacewatch	·	2.0 km	MPC · JPL

== 888801–888900 ==
back to top

Designation			Discovery			Properties		Ref
Permanent	Provisional	Named after	Date	Site	Discoverer(s)	Category	Diam.	Ref
888801	2010 ER_{191}	—	March 13, 2010	Mount Lemmon	Mount Lemmon Survey	MAS	490 m	MPC · JPL
888802	2010 ED_{192}	—	March 15, 2010	Mount Lemmon	Mount Lemmon Survey	·	1.8 km	MPC · JPL
888803	2010 EP_{192}	—	March 13, 2010	Kitt Peak	Spacewatch	·	660 m	MPC · JPL
888804	2010 FA_{1}	—	March 16, 2010	Kitt Peak	Spacewatch	·	640 m	MPC · JPL
888805	2010 FS_{3}	—	February 19, 2010	Mount Lemmon	Mount Lemmon Survey	·	1.5 km	MPC · JPL
888806	2010 FR_{11}	—	March 16, 2010	Kitt Peak	Spacewatch	NYS	640 m	MPC · JPL
888807	2010 FS_{13}	—	March 17, 2010	Kitt Peak	Spacewatch	·	1.7 km	MPC · JPL
888808	2010 FS_{15}	—	February 20, 2010	Kitt Peak	Spacewatch	·	680 m	MPC · JPL
888809	2010 FB_{22}	—	February 16, 2010	Mount Lemmon	Mount Lemmon Survey	·	1.7 km	MPC · JPL
888810	2010 FD_{22}	—	March 18, 2010	Mount Lemmon	Mount Lemmon Survey	·	1.5 km	MPC · JPL
888811	2010 FW_{23}	—	March 18, 2010	Mount Lemmon	Mount Lemmon Survey	·	1.6 km	MPC · JPL
888812	2010 FK_{31}	—	November 7, 2008	Mount Lemmon	Mount Lemmon Survey	·	1.3 km	MPC · JPL
888813	2010 FP_{129}	—	October 29, 2017	Haleakala	Pan-STARRS 1	T_{j} (2.98) · 3:2	2.9 km	MPC · JPL
888814	2010 FR_{134}	—	March 29, 2010	WISE	WISE	·	2.0 km	MPC · JPL
888815	2010 FC_{139}	—	March 20, 2010	Kitt Peak	Spacewatch	·	490 m	MPC · JPL
888816	2010 FU_{139}	—	March 20, 2010	Kitt Peak	Spacewatch	H	330 m	MPC · JPL
888817	2010 FL_{141}	—	August 21, 2015	Haleakala	Pan-STARRS 1	·	650 m	MPC · JPL
888818	2010 FN_{144}	—	March 16, 2010	Mount Lemmon	Mount Lemmon Survey	·	2.3 km	MPC · JPL
888819	2010 FT_{144}	—	March 21, 2010	Mount Lemmon	Mount Lemmon Survey	THM	1.6 km	MPC · JPL
888820	2010 FW_{144}	—	March 18, 2010	Kitt Peak	Spacewatch	·	1.8 km	MPC · JPL
888821	2010 FE_{145}	—	March 19, 2010	Kitt Peak	Spacewatch	·	1.2 km	MPC · JPL
888822	2010 FE_{146}	—	March 18, 2010	Mount Lemmon	Mount Lemmon Survey	·	1.8 km	MPC · JPL
888823	2010 GM_{29}	—	April 8, 2010	Mount Lemmon	Mount Lemmon Survey	·	2.4 km	MPC · JPL
888824	2010 GU_{98}	—	April 4, 2010	Kitt Peak	Spacewatch	·	360 m	MPC · JPL
888825	2010 GN_{104}	—	March 12, 2010	Mount Lemmon	Mount Lemmon Survey	EUN	790 m	MPC · JPL
888826	2010 GN_{110}	—	March 24, 2006	Kitt Peak	Spacewatch	·	1.0 km	MPC · JPL
888827	2010 GJ_{121}	—	March 9, 1997	Kitt Peak	Spacewatch	·	330 m	MPC · JPL
888828	2010 GX_{128}	—	March 13, 2010	Kitt Peak	Spacewatch	·	620 m	MPC · JPL
888829	2010 GD_{129}	—	April 5, 2010	Kitt Peak	Spacewatch	·	2.2 km	MPC · JPL
888830	2010 GN_{133}	—	April 11, 2010	Kitt Peak	Spacewatch	TIR	2.0 km	MPC · JPL
888831	2010 GE_{135}	—	April 4, 2010	Kitt Peak	Spacewatch	·	720 m	MPC · JPL
888832	2010 GS_{139}	—	April 7, 2010	Kitt Peak	Spacewatch	·	740 m	MPC · JPL
888833	2010 GF_{142}	—	March 24, 2006	Mount Lemmon	Mount Lemmon Survey	EUN	720 m	MPC · JPL
888834	2010 GO_{182}	—	April 7, 2010	WISE	WISE	T_{j} (2.99) · EUP	2.5 km	MPC · JPL
888835	2010 GH_{185}	—	January 4, 2006	Kitt Peak	Spacewatch	·	870 m	MPC · JPL
888836	2010 GU_{200}	—	April 9, 2010	Kitt Peak	Spacewatch	·	1.1 km	MPC · JPL
888837	2010 GW_{201}	—	March 14, 2010	Kitt Peak	Spacewatch	·	2.0 km	MPC · JPL
888838	2010 GG_{202}	—	April 9, 2010	Mount Lemmon	Mount Lemmon Survey	·	1.8 km	MPC · JPL
888839	2010 GB_{203}	—	September 23, 2011	Haleakala	Pan-STARRS 1	·	670 m	MPC · JPL
888840	2010 GZ_{203}	—	April 21, 2014	Mount Lemmon	Mount Lemmon Survey	·	1.0 km	MPC · JPL
888841	2010 GO_{209}	—	April 11, 2010	Kitt Peak	Spacewatch	·	1.7 km	MPC · JPL
888842	2010 GT_{209}	—	April 9, 2010	Mount Lemmon	Mount Lemmon Survey	·	2.2 km	MPC · JPL
888843	2010 GW_{209}	—	April 15, 2010	Kitt Peak	Spacewatch	·	700 m	MPC · JPL
888844	2010 GD_{210}	—	April 10, 2010	Mount Lemmon	Mount Lemmon Survey	VER	1.8 km	MPC · JPL
888845	2010 GM_{210}	—	April 4, 2010	Kitt Peak	Spacewatch	·	570 m	MPC · JPL
888846	2010 GH_{212}	—	April 15, 2010	Mount Lemmon	Mount Lemmon Survey	·	390 m	MPC · JPL
888847	2010 GT_{212}	—	April 10, 2010	Mount Lemmon	Mount Lemmon Survey	·	1.9 km	MPC · JPL
888848	2010 GA_{214}	—	April 9, 2010	Mount Lemmon	Mount Lemmon Survey	·	960 m	MPC · JPL
888849	2010 GD_{214}	—	January 22, 2015	Haleakala	Pan-STARRS 1	·	1.9 km	MPC · JPL
888850	2010 HW_{6}	—	December 19, 2009	Mauna Kea	Mauna Kea	·	860 m	MPC · JPL
888851	2010 HA_{79}	—	April 26, 2010	Mount Lemmon	Mount Lemmon Survey	(194)	990 m	MPC · JPL
888852	2010 HT_{126}	—	March 21, 2015	Haleakala	Pan-STARRS 1	T_{j} (2.98) · EUP	2.8 km	MPC · JPL
888853	2010 HW_{126}	—	April 24, 2010	WISE	WISE	·	1.8 km	MPC · JPL
888854	2010 HV_{139}	—	April 22, 2010	Kitt Peak	Spacewatch	·	1.6 km	MPC · JPL
888855	2010 HL_{141}	—	January 20, 2015	Mount Lemmon	Mount Lemmon Survey	·	2.2 km	MPC · JPL
888856	2010 JQ_{38}	—	March 19, 2010	Kitt Peak	Spacewatch	·	2.0 km	MPC · JPL
888857	2010 JT_{48}	—	April 13, 2010	Mount Lemmon	Mount Lemmon Survey	·	930 m	MPC · JPL
888858	2010 JZ_{74}	—	May 11, 2010	Nogales	M. Schwartz, P. R. Holvorcem	·	1.6 km	MPC · JPL
888859	2010 JV_{78}	—	April 25, 2010	Kitt Peak	Spacewatch	·	640 m	MPC · JPL
888860	2010 JE_{117}	—	May 3, 2010	Kitt Peak	Spacewatch	·	1.6 km	MPC · JPL
888861	2010 JQ_{157}	—	May 13, 2010	Kitt Peak	Spacewatch	TIR	1.7 km	MPC · JPL
888862	2010 JY_{160}	—	April 15, 2010	Mount Lemmon	Mount Lemmon Survey	·	430 m	MPC · JPL
888863	2010 JB_{164}	—	May 9, 2010	Mount Lemmon	Mount Lemmon Survey	·	1.8 km	MPC · JPL
888864	2010 JB_{166}	—	May 11, 2010	Kitt Peak	Spacewatch	·	700 m	MPC · JPL
888865	2010 JW_{175}	—	May 13, 2010	Kitt Peak	Spacewatch	JUN	800 m	MPC · JPL
888866	2010 JM_{198}	—	March 13, 2005	Kitt Peak	Spacewatch	·	1.5 km	MPC · JPL
888867	2010 JV_{201}	—	December 21, 2017	Mount Lemmon	Mount Lemmon Survey	·	1.1 km	MPC · JPL
888868	2010 KU_{134}	—	May 17, 2010	WISE	WISE	·	1.8 km	MPC · JPL
888869	2010 KK_{157}	—	May 19, 2010	Mount Lemmon	Mount Lemmon Survey	·	810 m	MPC · JPL
888870	2010 LP_{158}	—	June 5, 2010	Kitt Peak	Spacewatch	·	2.4 km	MPC · JPL
888871	2010 MU_{149}	—	June 19, 2010	Mount Lemmon	Mount Lemmon Survey	·	1.0 km	MPC · JPL
888872	2010 NO_{6}	—	July 8, 2010	Kitt Peak	Spacewatch	·	530 m	MPC · JPL
888873	2010 NX_{144}	—	April 10, 2010	Kitt Peak	Spacewatch	·	820 m	MPC · JPL
888874	2010 PS_{88}	—	August 12, 2010	Kitt Peak	Spacewatch	·	400 m	MPC · JPL
888875	2010 PG_{89}	—	August 31, 2014	Haleakala	Pan-STARRS 1	·	900 m	MPC · JPL
888876	2010 PJ_{91}	—	August 12, 2010	Kitt Peak	Spacewatch	·	930 m	MPC · JPL
888877	2010 RG_{36}	—	September 2, 2010	Mount Lemmon	Mount Lemmon Survey	·	1.1 km	MPC · JPL
888878	2010 RC_{42}	—	September 2, 2010	Mount Lemmon	Mount Lemmon Survey	·	1.3 km	MPC · JPL
888879	2010 RY_{57}	—	September 5, 2010	Mount Lemmon	Mount Lemmon Survey	BAR	820 m	MPC · JPL
888880	2010 RE_{90}	—	September 29, 2005	Mount Lemmon	Mount Lemmon Survey	·	1.6 km	MPC · JPL
888881	2010 RW_{91}	—	September 10, 2010	Kitt Peak	Spacewatch	·	670 m	MPC · JPL
888882	2010 RB_{105}	—	September 10, 2010	Kitt Peak	Spacewatch	·	710 m	MPC · JPL
888883	2010 RY_{112}	—	September 11, 2010	Kitt Peak	Spacewatch	·	730 m	MPC · JPL
888884	2010 RV_{116}	—	September 11, 2010	Kitt Peak	Spacewatch	NYS	780 m	MPC · JPL
888885	2010 RW_{120}	—	September 11, 2010	Kitt Peak	Spacewatch	MRX	660 m	MPC · JPL
888886	2010 RU_{137}	—	September 10, 2010	Mount Lemmon	Mount Lemmon Survey	·	550 m	MPC · JPL
888887	2010 RM_{153}	—	September 15, 2010	Kitt Peak	Spacewatch	·	1.1 km	MPC · JPL
888888	2010 RD_{158}	—	January 26, 2012	Kitt Peak	Spacewatch	·	1.3 km	MPC · JPL
888889	2010 RK_{169}	—	September 2, 2010	Mount Lemmon	Mount Lemmon Survey	·	1.3 km	MPC · JPL
888890	2010 RZ_{170}	—	September 4, 2010	Kitt Peak	Spacewatch	·	710 m	MPC · JPL
888891	2010 RV_{175}	—	September 10, 2010	Kitt Peak	Spacewatch	·	1.5 km	MPC · JPL
888892	2010 RK_{188}	—	September 11, 2010	Kitt Peak	Spacewatch	3:2 · SHU	3.6 km	MPC · JPL
888893	2010 RX_{194}	—	September 15, 2010	Kitt Peak	Spacewatch	·	610 m	MPC · JPL
888894	2010 RG_{195}	—	December 29, 2011	Mount Lemmon	Mount Lemmon Survey	GEF	790 m	MPC · JPL
888895	2010 RR_{218}	—	September 5, 2010	Mount Lemmon	Mount Lemmon Survey	MAS	380 m	MPC · JPL
888896	2010 RD_{220}	—	September 10, 2010	Kitt Peak	Spacewatch	·	580 m	MPC · JPL
888897	2010 RF_{220}	—	September 4, 2010	Mount Lemmon	Mount Lemmon Survey	3:2	3.8 km	MPC · JPL
888898	2010 RM_{220}	—	September 14, 2010	Kitt Peak	Spacewatch	·	650 m	MPC · JPL
888899	2010 RE_{222}	—	September 5, 2010	Mount Lemmon	Mount Lemmon Survey	·	1.2 km	MPC · JPL
888900	2010 RX_{224}	—	September 2, 2010	Mount Lemmon	Mount Lemmon Survey	·	910 m	MPC · JPL

== 888901–889000 ==
back to top

Designation			Discovery			Properties		Ref
Permanent	Provisional	Named after	Date	Site	Discoverer(s)	Category	Diam.	Ref
888901	2010 RZ_{228}	—	September 10, 2010	Mount Lemmon	Mount Lemmon Survey	·	1.2 km	MPC · JPL
888902	2010 SZ_{11}	—	September 19, 2010	SM Montmagastrell	Bosch, J. M.	·	1.0 km	MPC · JPL
888903	2010 SA_{23}	—	September 29, 2010	Mount Lemmon	Mount Lemmon Survey	·	2.0 km	MPC · JPL
888904	2010 SF_{23}	—	September 29, 2010	Mount Lemmon	Mount Lemmon Survey	NYS	660 m	MPC · JPL
888905	2010 SC_{33}	—	September 30, 2010	Mount Lemmon	Mount Lemmon Survey	·	1.1 km	MPC · JPL
888906	2010 SE_{54}	—	September 30, 2010	Mount Lemmon	Mount Lemmon Survey	·	1.0 km	MPC · JPL
888907	2010 SS_{56}	—	September 17, 2010	Kitt Peak	Spacewatch	·	380 m	MPC · JPL
888908	2010 SF_{69}	—	September 17, 2010	Mount Lemmon	Mount Lemmon Survey	·	1.1 km	MPC · JPL
888909	2010 TX_{8}	—	October 1, 2010	Kitt Peak	Spacewatch	NYS	660 m	MPC · JPL
888910	2010 TJ_{26}	—	October 2, 2010	Kitt Peak	Spacewatch	·	810 m	MPC · JPL
888911	2010 TQ_{27}	—	October 2, 2010	Kitt Peak	Spacewatch	·	730 m	MPC · JPL
888912	2010 TO_{39}	—	October 30, 2005	Kitt Peak	Spacewatch	·	1.6 km	MPC · JPL
888913	2010 TO_{56}	—	October 3, 2010	Kitt Peak	Spacewatch	·	1.2 km	MPC · JPL
888914	2010 TO_{90}	—	October 9, 2010	Mount Lemmon	Mount Lemmon Survey	PHO	660 m	MPC · JPL
888915	2010 TC_{97}	—	October 9, 2010	Mount Lemmon	Mount Lemmon Survey	·	530 m	MPC · JPL
888916	2010 TJ_{104}	—	September 30, 2003	Kitt Peak	Spacewatch	·	360 m	MPC · JPL
888917	2010 TN_{151}	—	October 1, 2010	Mount Lemmon	Mount Lemmon Survey	·	570 m	MPC · JPL
888918	2010 TD_{181}	—	September 29, 2010	Mount Lemmon	Mount Lemmon Survey	·	780 m	MPC · JPL
888919	2010 TR_{186}	—	September 5, 2010	La Sagra	OAM	·	800 m	MPC · JPL
888920	2010 TX_{200}	—	October 4, 2010	Charleston	International Astronomical Search Collaboration	·	590 m	MPC · JPL
888921	2010 TU_{202}	—	October 9, 2010	Mount Lemmon	Mount Lemmon Survey	·	720 m	MPC · JPL
888922	2010 TT_{215}	—	October 30, 2005	Mount Lemmon	Mount Lemmon Survey	·	1.4 km	MPC · JPL
888923	2010 TD_{223}	—	October 13, 2010	Mount Lemmon	Mount Lemmon Survey	·	1.6 km	MPC · JPL
888924	2010 TL_{229}	—	October 12, 2010	Mount Lemmon	Mount Lemmon Survey	PHO	600 m	MPC · JPL
888925	2010 TU_{231}	—	October 2, 2010	Kitt Peak	Spacewatch	V	320 m	MPC · JPL
888926	2010 UK_{1}	—	October 17, 2010	Mount Lemmon	Mount Lemmon Survey	T_{j} (2.98)	2.1 km	MPC · JPL
888927	2010 UT_{47}	—	October 30, 2010	Piszkéstető	K. Sárneczky, Z. Kuli	NYS	630 m	MPC · JPL
888928	2010 UL_{48}	—	October 31, 2010	Kitt Peak	Spacewatch	·	760 m	MPC · JPL
888929	2010 UH_{49}	—	October 12, 2010	Mount Lemmon	Mount Lemmon Survey	MAS	400 m	MPC · JPL
888930	2010 UN_{58}	—	October 29, 2010	Kitt Peak	Spacewatch	·	640 m	MPC · JPL
888931	2010 UT_{101}	—	September 29, 2010	Mount Lemmon	Mount Lemmon Survey	DOR	1.5 km	MPC · JPL
888932	2010 UK_{111}	—	October 30, 2010	Kitt Peak	Spacewatch	·	750 m	MPC · JPL
888933	2010 UO_{114}	—	October 30, 2010	Kitt Peak	Spacewatch	·	2.1 km	MPC · JPL
888934	2010 UB_{123}	—	October 29, 2010	Mount Lemmon	Mount Lemmon Survey	·	620 m	MPC · JPL
888935	2010 UD_{125}	—	October 29, 2010	Mount Lemmon	Mount Lemmon Survey	·	920 m	MPC · JPL
888936	2010 UA_{126}	—	October 17, 2010	Mount Lemmon	Mount Lemmon Survey	·	1.4 km	MPC · JPL
888937	2010 UZ_{132}	—	October 17, 2010	Mount Lemmon	Mount Lemmon Survey	·	580 m	MPC · JPL
888938	2010 VO_{3}	—	November 1, 2010	Mount Lemmon	Mount Lemmon Survey	·	600 m	MPC · JPL
888939	2010 VC_{18}	—	April 7, 2008	Kitt Peak	Spacewatch	·	1.4 km	MPC · JPL
888940	2010 VJ_{31}	—	November 3, 2010	Mount Lemmon	Mount Lemmon Survey	·	1.1 km	MPC · JPL
888941	2010 VL_{56}	—	October 17, 2010	Mount Lemmon	Mount Lemmon Survey	·	1.5 km	MPC · JPL
888942	2010 VV_{56}	—	November 3, 2010	Mount Lemmon	Mount Lemmon Survey	MAS	430 m	MPC · JPL
888943	2010 VJ_{58}	—	October 13, 2010	Mount Lemmon	Mount Lemmon Survey	·	620 m	MPC · JPL
888944	2010 VK_{66}	—	November 1, 2010	Mount Lemmon	Mount Lemmon Survey	·	1.7 km	MPC · JPL
888945	2010 VX_{82}	—	November 4, 2010	La Sagra	OAM	PHO	830 m	MPC · JPL
888946	2010 VK_{93}	—	November 7, 2010	Mount Lemmon	Mount Lemmon Survey	·	550 m	MPC · JPL
888947	2010 VZ_{119}	—	September 18, 2010	Mount Lemmon	Mount Lemmon Survey	·	810 m	MPC · JPL
888948	2010 VF_{147}	—	November 6, 2010	Mount Lemmon	Mount Lemmon Survey	·	810 m	MPC · JPL
888949	2010 VK_{157}	—	October 13, 2010	Mount Lemmon	Mount Lemmon Survey	V	460 m	MPC · JPL
888950	2010 VS_{162}	—	November 10, 2010	Kitt Peak	Spacewatch	·	680 m	MPC · JPL
888951	2010 VQ_{174}	—	November 11, 2010	Kitt Peak	Spacewatch	·	760 m	MPC · JPL
888952	2010 VR_{185}	—	October 30, 2010	Kitt Peak	Spacewatch	V	400 m	MPC · JPL
888953	2010 VU_{198}	—	November 15, 2010	Mount Lemmon	Mount Lemmon Survey	AMO	670 m	MPC · JPL
888954	2010 VL_{209}	—	October 17, 2010	Mount Lemmon	Mount Lemmon Survey	MAS	510 m	MPC · JPL
888955	2010 VE_{215}	—	October 17, 2010	Mount Lemmon	Mount Lemmon Survey	·	700 m	MPC · JPL
888956	2010 VS_{216}	—	October 13, 2010	Mount Lemmon	Mount Lemmon Survey	·	610 m	MPC · JPL
888957	2010 VA_{244}	—	October 3, 2013	Haleakala	Pan-STARRS 1	·	680 m	MPC · JPL
888958	2010 VE_{245}	—	January 27, 2015	Haleakala	Pan-STARRS 1	·	670 m	MPC · JPL
888959	2010 VM_{252}	—	November 3, 2010	Mount Lemmon	Mount Lemmon Survey	NYS	650 m	MPC · JPL
888960	2010 VV_{263}	—	November 2, 2010	Mount Lemmon	Mount Lemmon Survey	·	1.4 km	MPC · JPL
888961	2010 VZ_{269}	—	November 3, 2010	Mount Lemmon	Mount Lemmon Survey	·	790 m	MPC · JPL
888962	2010 VV_{270}	—	November 13, 2010	Mount Lemmon	Mount Lemmon Survey	·	2.2 km	MPC · JPL
888963	2010 VT_{272}	—	November 3, 2010	Mount Lemmon	Mount Lemmon Survey	PHO	740 m	MPC · JPL
888964	2010 VZ_{279}	—	November 10, 2010	Mount Lemmon	Mount Lemmon Survey	·	1.5 km	MPC · JPL
888965	2010 WT_{23}	—	November 27, 2010	Mount Lemmon	Mount Lemmon Survey	·	680 m	MPC · JPL
888966	2010 WA_{33}	—	November 27, 2010	Mount Lemmon	Mount Lemmon Survey	·	670 m	MPC · JPL
888967	2010 WN_{37}	—	November 27, 2010	Mount Lemmon	Mount Lemmon Survey	·	2.0 km	MPC · JPL
888968	2010 WU_{51}	—	November 28, 2010	Mount Lemmon	Mount Lemmon Survey	MAS	430 m	MPC · JPL
888969	2010 WE_{57}	—	November 8, 2010	Kitt Peak	Spacewatch	·	720 m	MPC · JPL
888970	2010 WV_{75}	—	November 30, 2010	Mount Lemmon	Mount Lemmon Survey	NYS	720 m	MPC · JPL
888971	2010 WX_{76}	—	November 10, 2010	Mount Lemmon	Mount Lemmon Survey	·	670 m	MPC · JPL
888972	2010 XC_{38}	—	December 26, 2006	Kitt Peak	Spacewatch	·	870 m	MPC · JPL
888973	2010 XM_{45}	—	September 3, 2000	Apache Point	SDSS	·	1.3 km	MPC · JPL
888974	2010 XC_{49}	—	November 7, 2010	Mount Lemmon	Mount Lemmon Survey	·	1.1 km	MPC · JPL
888975	2010 XZ_{96}	—	December 10, 2010	Mount Lemmon	Mount Lemmon Survey	·	2.4 km	MPC · JPL
888976	2010 XC_{97}	—	March 27, 2012	Mayhill-ISON	L. Elenin	·	1.2 km	MPC · JPL
888977	2010 XL_{98}	—	December 10, 2010	Mount Lemmon	Mount Lemmon Survey	·	680 m	MPC · JPL
888978	2010 XN_{99}	—	December 13, 2010	Mount Lemmon	Mount Lemmon Survey	·	1.1 km	MPC · JPL
888979	2010 XQ_{103}	—	September 28, 2013	Mount Lemmon	Mount Lemmon Survey	·	550 m	MPC · JPL
888980	2010 XN_{111}	—	December 5, 2010	Mount Lemmon	Mount Lemmon Survey	EOS	1.4 km	MPC · JPL
888981	2010 XM_{115}	—	December 2, 2010	Mount Lemmon	Mount Lemmon Survey	·	640 m	MPC · JPL
888982	2010 XF_{120}	—	December 8, 2010	Mount Lemmon	Mount Lemmon Survey	H	340 m	MPC · JPL
888983	2010 XJ_{120}	—	December 2, 2010	Kitt Peak	Spacewatch	V	430 m	MPC · JPL
888984	2011 AU_{9}	—	January 3, 2011	Mount Lemmon	Mount Lemmon Survey	·	830 m	MPC · JPL
888985	2011 AY_{15}	—	January 3, 2011	Catalina	CSS	PHO	900 m	MPC · JPL
888986	2011 AG_{30}	—	January 9, 2011	Kitt Peak	Spacewatch	·	2.2 km	MPC · JPL
888987	2011 AK_{66}	—	January 14, 2011	Kitt Peak	Spacewatch	·	2.3 km	MPC · JPL
888988	2011 AK_{67}	—	January 14, 2011	Mount Lemmon	Mount Lemmon Survey	·	2.6 km	MPC · JPL
888989	2011 AO_{78}	—	January 22, 2006	Mount Lemmon	Mount Lemmon Survey	·	1.3 km	MPC · JPL
888990	2011 AH_{83}	—	January 14, 2011	Mount Lemmon	Mount Lemmon Survey	·	830 m	MPC · JPL
888991	2011 AT_{83}	—	January 9, 2011	Mount Lemmon	Mount Lemmon Survey	MAS	530 m	MPC · JPL
888992	2011 AG_{84}	—	January 14, 2011	Mount Lemmon	Mount Lemmon Survey	·	830 m	MPC · JPL
888993	2011 AA_{88}	—	January 14, 2011	Kitt Peak	Spacewatch	·	790 m	MPC · JPL
888994	2011 AH_{90}	—	January 14, 2011	Mount Lemmon	Mount Lemmon Survey	BRA	900 m	MPC · JPL
888995	2011 AD_{92}	—	January 8, 2011	Mount Lemmon	Mount Lemmon Survey	·	790 m	MPC · JPL
888996	2011 AK_{92}	—	January 14, 2011	Mount Lemmon	Mount Lemmon Survey	·	1.7 km	MPC · JPL
888997	2011 AB_{94}	—	July 25, 2017	Haleakala	Pan-STARRS 1	·	720 m	MPC · JPL
888998	2011 AX_{94}	—	January 12, 2011	Mount Lemmon	Mount Lemmon Survey	·	630 m	MPC · JPL
888999	2011 AZ_{98}	—	January 2, 2011	Mount Lemmon	Mount Lemmon Survey	·	2.1 km	MPC · JPL
889000	2011 AE_{99}	—	January 14, 2011	Mount Lemmon	Mount Lemmon Survey	EOS	1.2 km	MPC · JPL

back to top

== See also ==
- Meanings of minor-planet names: 888001–889000
