= Meanings of minor-planet names: 1001–2000 =

As minor planet discoveries are confirmed, they are given a permanent number by the IAU's Minor Planet Center (MPC), and the discoverers can then submit names for them, following the IAU's naming conventions. The list below concerns those minor planets in the specified number-range that have received names, and explains the meanings of those names.

Official naming citations of newly named small Solar System bodies are approved and published in a bulletin by IAU's Working Group for Small Bodies Nomenclature (WGSBN). Before May 2021, citations were published in MPC's Minor Planet Circulars for many decades. Recent citations can also be found on the JPL Small-Body Database (SBDB). Until his death in 2016, German astronomer Lutz D. Schmadel compiled these citations into the Dictionary of Minor Planet Names (DMP) and regularly updated the collection.

Based on Paul Herget's The Names of the Minor Planets, Schmadel also researched the unclear origin of numerous asteroids, most of which had been named prior to World War II. This article incorporates text from this source, which is in the public domain: SBDB New namings may only be added to this list below after official publication as the preannouncement of names is condemned. The WGSBN publishes a comprehensive guideline for the naming rules of non-cometary small Solar System bodies.

== 1001–1100 ==
Named minor planet	Provisional	This minor planet was named for...	Ref · Catalog
1001 Gaussia	1923 OA	Carl Friedrich Gauss (1777–1855), German mathematician	DMP · 1001
1002 Olbersia	1923 OB	Heinrich Olbers (1758–1840), German astronomer	DMP · 1002
1003 Lilofee	1923 OK	Lilofee, a legendary character and title figure in an old German folk-song Die schöne junge Lilofee	DMP · 1003
1004 Belopolskya	1923 OS	Aristarkh Belopolsky (1854–1934), Russian astrophysicist	DMP · 1004
1005 Arago	1923 OT	François Arago (1786–1853), French astronomer	DMP · 1005
1006 Lagrangea	1923 OU	Joseph-Louis Lagrange (1736–1813), French astronomer	DMP · 1006
1007 Pawlowia	1923 OX	Ivan Pavlov (1849–1936), Russian physiologist	DMP · 1007
1008 La Paz	1923 PD	The city of La Paz, capital of Bolivia	DMP · 1008
1009 Sirene	1923 PE	The Sirens of mythology	DMP · 1009
1010 Marlene	1923 PF	Marlene Dietrich (1901–1992), German actress	DMP · 1010
1011 Laodamia	1924 PK	Laodamia, daughter of Bellerophon and Philonoe in Greek mythology, and the mother (by Zeus) of Sarpedon; shot dead by Artemis whilst weaving	DMP · 1011
1012 Sarema	1924 PM	Sarema, a character in a poem by Aleksandr Sergeyevich Pushkin, made into an opera by Alexander von Zemlinsky	DMP · 1012
1013 Tombecka	1924 PQ	Daniel Tombeck, French chemist who in 1910 succeeded Amédée Guillet as secretary of the Faculty of Science of the University of Paris	DMP · 1013
1014 Semphyra	1924 PW	Semphyra, a character in a poem by Aleksandr Sergeyevich Pushkin	DMP · 1014
1015 Christa	1924 QF	Unknown origin of name	DMP · 1015
1016 Anitra	1924 QG	Anitra, character in the drama Peer Gynt by Henrik Ibsen (1828–1906)	DMP · 1016
1017 Jacqueline	1924 QL	Jacqueline Zadoc-Kahn, disciple of Russian discoverer Benjamin Jekhowsky	DMP · 1017
1018 Arnolda	1924 QM	Arnold Berliner (1862–1942), German physicist and editor of the journal Naturwissenschaften	DMP · 1018
1019 Strackea	1924 QN	Gustav Stracke (1887–1943), German astronomer (see also 1201 Strenua and 1227 Geranium)	DMP · 1019
1020 Arcadia	1924 QV	Arcadia, mythological Greek place and modern Greek province	DMP · 1020
1021 Flammario	1924 RG	Camille Flammarion (1842–1925), French astronomer	DMP · 1021
1022 Olympiada	1924 RT	Olimpiada Albitskaya, mother of the discoverer	DMP · 1022
1023 Thomana	1924 RU	Boys' choir of St. Thomas Church, Leipzig, Germany	DMP · 1023
1024 Hale	1923 YO_{13}	George Ellery Hale (1868–1938), American solar astronomer	DMP · 1024
1025 Riema	1923 NX	Johannes Riem (1868–1945), German astronomer	DMP · 1025
1026 Ingrid	1923 NY	Ingrid, niece of German astronomer Albrecht Kahrstedt (1897–1971), also see (1587)	DMP · 1026
1027 Aesculapia	1923 YO_{11}	Asclepius, Greek god; named to redeem Jupiter's promise to Minerva to place Aesculapius among the stars (formerly, Ophiuchus was called Aesculapius)	DMP · 1027
1028 Lydina	1923 PG	Lydia Albitskaya, wife of Russian discoverer Vladimir Albitsky	DMP · 1028
1029 La Plata	1924 RK	La Plata, Argentina	DMP · 1029
1030 Vitja	1924 RQ	Viktor Zaslavsky (1925–1944), nephew of Spiridon Zaslavskij (see 1330 Spiridonia), the brother-in-law of the discoverer Vladimir Albitsky	DMP · 1030
1031 Arctica	1924 RR	The Arctic	DMP · 1031
1032 Pafuri	1924 SA	Pafuri River in northern Transvaal, South Africa	DMP · 1032
1033 Simona	1924 SM	Simone van Biesbroeck, daughter of the discoverer George Van Biesbroeck	DMP · 1033
1034 Mozartia	1924 SS	Wolfgang Amadeus Mozart (1756–1791), Austrian composer	DMP · 1034
1035 Amata	1924 SW	Amata, wife of king Latinus and mother of Lavinia, the wife of Aeneas	DMP · 1035
1036 Ganymed	1924 TD	Ganymede, mythological cupbearer	DMP · 1036
1037 Davidweilla	1924 TF	One of the members of the David-Weill family, member of the Academy of Sciences and benefactor of the Sorbonne	DMP · 1037
1038 Tuckia	1924 TK	Edward Tuck (1842–1938) and his wife; philanthropists. Edward was the son of the founder of the American Republican Party	DMP · 1038
1039 Sonneberga	1924 TL	German town of Sonneberg in Thuringia, where the Sonneberg Observatory is located	DMP · 1039
1040 Klumpkea	1925 BD	Dorothea Klumpke (1861–1942), American amateur astronomer, first woman to receive a Ph.D. in mathematics from the Sorbonne	DMP · 1040
1041 Asta	1925 FA	Asta Nielsen (1881–1972), Danish actress	DMP · 1041
1042 Amazone	1925 HA	The River Amazon in South America	DMP · 1042
1043 Beate	1925 HB	Unknown origin of name	DMP · 1043
1044 Teutonia	1924 RO	The Teutonic peoples	DMP · 1044
1045 Michela	1924 TR	Micheline van Biesbroeck, daughter of discoverer George Van Biesbroeck	DMP · 1045
1046 Edwin	1924 UA	Edwin van Biesbroeck, son of discoverer George Van Biesbroeck	DMP · 1046
1047 Geisha	1924 TE	Musical comedy The Geisha by Sidney Jones	DMP · 1047
1048 Feodosia	1924 TP	Crimean city of Feodosiya (Theodosia), Ukraine	DMP · 1048
1049 Gotho	1925 RB	Unknown origin of name	DMP · 1049
1050 Meta	1925 RC	Unknown origin of name	DMP · 1050
1051 Merope	1925 SA	Merope, Greek muse and goddess	DMP · 1051
1052 Belgica	1925 VD	Belgium	DMP · 1052
1053 Vigdis	1925 WA	Unknown origin of name (Vigdís is an ancient Nordic feminine surname)	DMP · 1053
1054 Forsytia	1925 WD	The flowering shrub genus Forsythia	DMP · 1054
1055 Tynka	1925 WG	Tynka, mother of Emil Buchar (1901–1979), of the Institute of Astronomy and Geophysics, Czech Technical University in Prague	DMP · 1055
1056 Azalea	1924 QD	The azalea flowering shrubs, then thought a genus of their own, now subgenera of the genus Rhododendron	DMP · 1056
1057 Wanda	1925 QB	Polish feminine name	DMP · 1057
1058 Grubba	1925 MA	Sir Howard Grubb (1844–1931) of Parson and Co., Newcastle upon Tyne, England, maker of the 40-inch reflecting telescope of the Simeis Observatory	DMP · 1058
1059 Mussorgskia	1925 OA	Modest Mussorgsky (1839–1881), Russian composer	DMP · 1059
1060 Magnolia	1925 PA	The flowering tree genus Magnolia	DMP · 1060
1061 Paeonia	1925 TB	The peony flowering plant, genus Paeonia	DMP · 1061
1062 Ljuba	1925 TD	Lyuba Berlin (1915–1936), Soviet parachutist	DMP · 1062
1063 Aquilegia	1925 XA	The columbine flower, genus Aquilegia	DMP · 1063
1064 Aethusa	1926 PA	The fool's parsley herb, genus Aethusa	DMP · 1064
1065 Amundsenia	1926 PD	Roald Amundsen (1872–1928), polar explorer	DMP · 1065
1066 Lobelia	1926 RA	The Indian tobacco flower, genus Lobelia	DMP · 1066
1067 Lunaria	1926 RG	The honesty flowering plant, genus Lunaria	DMP · 1067
1068 Nofretete	1926 RK	Nefertiti (c. 1370 – c. 1330 BC), wife of the Egyptian pharaoh Amenhotep IV	DMP · 1068
1069 Planckia	1927 BC	Max Planck (1858–1947), German physicist and Nobelist, on the occasion of his 80th birthday	DMP · 1069
1070 Tunica	1926 RB	The flowering plant genus Tunica of the pink or carnation family	DMP · 1070
1071 Brita	1924 RE	Great Britain, where the 1-meter telescope for the Simeiz Observatory on Crimea was made	DMP · 1071
1072 Malva	1926 TA	The mallow plant, genus Malva	DMP · 1072
1073 Gellivara	1923 OW	Gällivare, town in Swedish Lapland, where astronomers from several countries observed a total solar eclipse on 29 June 1927	DMP · 1073
1074 Beljawskya	1925 BE	Sergey Belyavsky (1883–1953), Russian astronomer and discoverer of minor planets	DMP · 1074
1075 Helina	1926 SC	Helij Grigor'evich Neujmin, a son of Russian discoverer Grigory Neujmin	DMP · 1075
1076 Viola	1926 TE	The violets, pansies and violas, genus Viola	DMP · 1076
1077 Campanula	1926 TK	The flowering plant genus Campanula	DMP · 1077
1078 Mentha	1926 XB	The true mints, genus Mentha	DMP · 1078
1079 Mimosa	1927 AD	The herb and shrub genus Mimosa, although the discoverer apparently meant the silk tree (Albizia julibrissin), since he referred to a "flowering tree"	DMP · 1079
1080 Orchis	1927 QB	The orchid flowers, genus Orchis	DMP · 1080
1081 Reseda	1927 QF	The mignonette, genus Reseda	DMP · 1081
1082 Pirola	1927 UC	The wintergreen, genus Pirola	DMP · 1082
1083 Salvia	1928 BC	The sage plant, genus Salvia	DMP · 1083
1084 Tamariwa	1926 CC	Tamara Ivanova (1912–1936), Soviet parachutist	DMP · 1084
1085 Amaryllis	1927 QH	The belladonna lily flower genus, Amaryllis	DMP · 1085
1086 Nata	1927 QL	Nata Babushkina (1915–1936), Soviet female parachutist	DMP · 1086
1087 Arabis	1927 RD	The mustard family herb genus Arabis	DMP · 1087
1088 Mitaka	1927 WA	Mitaka, Tokyo, where the Tokyo Astronomical Observatory is situated	DMP · 1088
1089 Tama	1927 WB	Tama River, Japan, which flows near the Tokyo Astronomical Observatory	DMP · 1089
1090 Sumida	1928 DG	Sumida River (Sumidagawa), Tokyo, Japan	DMP · 1090
1091 Spiraea	1928 DT	The flowering shrub genus Spiraea	DMP · 1091
1092 Lilium	1924 PN	The true lily flower, genus Lilium	DMP · 1092
1093 Freda	1925 LA	Fred Prévost, civil engineer of mines and benefactor of the Faculty of sciences of Bordeaux	DMP · 1093
1094 Siberia	1926 CB	Siberia, region of Russia	DMP · 1094
1095 Tulipa	1926 GS	The tulip flower. genus Tulipa	DMP · 1095
1096 Reunerta	1928 OB	Theodore Reunert, of the South African Association for the Advancement of Science, mining engineer and supporter of the former Union Observatory in South Africa, friend of the discoverer	DMP · 1096
1097 Vicia	1928 PC	The flowering plant genus Vicia	DMP · 1097
1098 Hakone	1928 RJ	Hakone, Japan	DMP · 1098
1099 Figneria	1928 RQ	Vera Figner (1852–1942), Russian revolutionary	DMP · 1099
1100 Arnica	1928 SD	The lamb's skin plants, genus Arnica	DMP · 1100

== 1101–1200 ==
back to top

Named minor planet	Provisional	This minor planet was named for...	Ref · Catalog
1101 Clematis	1928 SJ	The clematis flower, genus Clematis	DMP · 1101
1102 Pepita	1928 VA	Pepito, nickname of discoverer Josep Comas i Solà (1868–1937), using a feminine Latin suffix	DMP · 1102
1103 Sequoia	1928 VB	Sequoia National Park	DMP · 1103
1104 Syringa	1928 XA	The lilac, genus Syringa	DMP · 1104
1105 Fragaria	1929 AB	The strawberry, genus Fragaria	DMP · 1105
1106 Cydonia	1929 CW	The quince, genus Cydonia	DMP · 1106
1107 Lictoria	1929 FB	Lictoria, Italy, a new city established on reclaimed land near Rome during the Fascist regime	DMP · 1107
1108 Demeter	1929 KA	Demeter, Greek goddess (Ceres in Roman mythology)	DMP · 1108
1109 Tata	1929 CU	The small town of Tata in Hungary	DMP · 1109
1110 Jaroslawa	1928 PD	The town of Jarosław in south-eastern Poland	DMP · 1110
1111 Reinmuthia	1927 CO	Karl Reinmuth (1892–1979), German astronomer and discoverer of minor planets	DMP · 1111
1112 Polonia	1928 PE	Polonia, Latin for Poland	DMP · 1112
1113 Katja	1928 QC	Katja, Russian feminine name	DMP · 1113
1114 Lorraine	1928 WA	Lorraine in northeastern France, former duchy and remnant of the medieval kingdom of Lotharingia	DMP · 1114
1115 Sabauda	1928 XC	Sabauda, Latin name of the House of Savoy	DMP · 1115
1116 Catriona	1929 GD	Catriona, a Scottish feminine name, title of one of Robert Louis Stevenson's novels	DMP · 1116
1117 Reginita	1927 KA	Reginita, niece of Catalan discoverer Josep Comas i Solà	DMP · 1117
1118 Hanskya	1927 QD	Alexis Hansky (1872–1908), Russian astronomer	DMP · 1118
1119 Euboea	1927 UB	Euboea, Greece	DMP · 1119
1120 Cannonia	1928 RV	Annie Jump Cannon (1863–1941), American astronomer	DMP · 1120
1121 Natascha	1928 RZ	Natasha (Natalia) Tichomirova, Russian hydro-geologist and daughter of the Simeis astronomer Grigory Neujmin	DMP · 1121
1122 Neith	1928 SB	Neith, Egyptian goddess	DMP · 1122
1123 Shapleya	1928 ST	Harlow Shapley (1885–1972), American astronomer	DMP · 1123
1124 Stroobantia	1928 TB	Paul Stroobant (1868–1936), Belgian astronomer	DMP · 1124
1125 China	1957 UN_{1}	China	DMP · 1125
1126 Otero	1929 AC	Caroline Otéro (1868–1965), known as "La Belle Otero", a Galician-born dancer, actress and courtesan	DMP · 1126
1127 Mimi	1929 AJ	Wife of Eugène Delporte; 1127 Mimi and 1145 Robelmonte had their proposed names swapped by error	DMP · 1127
1128 Astrid	1929 EB	Astrid of Sweden (1905–1935), Queen consort of King Leopold III of Belgium	DMP · 1128
1129 Neujmina	1929 PH	Grigory Neujmin (1885–1946), Russian astronomer and discoverer of minor planets	DMP · 1129
1130 Skuld	1929 RC	Skuld, in Norse mythology, one of the three Norns, the Future	DMP · 1130
1131 Porzia	1929 RO	Porcia, a character in Shakespeare's play Julius Caesar	DMP · 1131
1132 Hollandia	1929 RB_{1}	Latin name for the Netherlands	DMP · 1132
1133 Lugduna	1929 RC_{1}	Feminine form of the Latin name of the Dutch city of Leiden, Lugdunum Batavorum	DMP · 1133
1134 Kepler	1929 SA	Johannes Kepler (1571–1630), astronomer	DMP · 1134
1135 Colchis	1929 TA	Colchis, Asia Minor, now Georgia	DMP · 1135
1136 Mercedes	1929 UA	Sister-in-law of Catalan discoverer Josep Comas i Solà	DMP · 1136
1137 Raïssa	1929 WB	Raïssa Izrailevna Maseeva (1900–1930), a former scientific collaborator at the Pulkovo Observatory	DMP · 1137
1138 Attica	1929 WF	Attica, Greece	DMP · 1138
1139 Atami	1929 XE	Atami, Shizuoka, Japan	DMP · 1139
1140 Crimea	1929 YC	Crimea, peninsula in the Black Sea	DMP · 1140
1141 Bohmia	1930 AA	Mrs. Bohm-Walz, who donated the Walz reflector to the Heidelberg Observatory	DMP · 1141
1142 Aetolia	1930 BC	Aetolia, Greece	DMP · 1142
1143 Odysseus	1930 BH	Odysseus, Greek hero	DMP · 1143
1144 Oda	1930 BJ	Female name chosen by discoverer Karl Reinmuth from the calendar Der Lahrer hinkende Bote	DMP · 1144
1145 Robelmonte	1929 CC	Robelmont, Belgium, birthplace of Sylvain Arend; 1127 Mimi and 1145 Robelmonte had their proposed names swapped by error	DMP · 1145
1146 Biarmia	1929 JF	Bjarmaland, legendary land	DMP · 1146
1147 Stavropolis	1929 LF	Stavropol, the city in Russia	DMP · 1147
1148 Rarahu	1929 NA	Tahitian girl's name, from Pierre Loti's novel Rarahu, later reprinted as Le Mariage de Loti	DMP · 1148
1149 Volga	1929 PF	Volga River, Russia	DMP · 1149
1150 Achaia	1929 RB	Achaea, Homeric name for Greece	DMP · 1150
1151 Ithaka	1929 RK	Ithaca, Greece	DMP · 1151
1152 Pawona	1930 AD	Astronomers Johann Palisa and Max Wolf, for their mutual collaboration	DMP · 1152
1153 Wallenbergia	1924 SL	Georg Wallenberg (1864–1924), German mathematician	DMP · 1153
1154 Astronomia	1927 CB	Astronomy	DMP · 1154
1155 Aënna	1928 BD	The astronomy journal Astronomische Nachrichten. Artificial name containing the German pronounced initials "A" and "N" followed by the feminine ending.	DMP · 1155
1156 Kira	1928 DA	Unknown origin of name	DMP · 1156
1157 Arabia	1929 QC	Arabia	DMP · 1157
1158 Luda	1929 QF	Feminine Russian name, diminutive of "Ludmilla"	DMP · 1158
1159 Granada	1929 RD	Granada, Spain	DMP · 1159
1160 Illyria	1929 RL	Illyria, in the Balkans	DMP · 1160
1161 Thessalia	1929 SF	Thessalia, Greece	DMP · 1161
1162 Larissa	1930 AC	Larissa, Greece	DMP · 1162
1163 Saga	1930 BA	The Norse sagas	DMP · 1163
1164 Kobolda	1930 FB	Hermann Kobold (1858–1942), German astronomer, and long-time editor of the Astronomische Nachrichten	DMP · 1164
1165 Imprinetta	1930 HM	Name of the wife of its discoverer, Dutch astronomer Hendrik van Gent	DMP · 1165
1166 Sakuntala	1930 MA	Sakuntala or Shakuntala, a character in an ancient Sanskrit drama	DMP · 1166
1167 Dubiago	1930 PB	Alexander Dubyago (1903–1959), Russian astronomer	DMP · 1167
1168 Brandia	1930 QA	Eugène Brand, Belgian mathematician	DMP · 1168
1169 Alwine	1930 QH	Unknown origin of name	DMP · 1169
1170 Siva	1930 SQ	The Hindu god Shiva or Siva, Lord of Knowledge	DMP · 1170
1171 Rusthawelia	1930 TA	Shota Rustaveli (c. 1160–1220), Georgian poet	DMP · 1171
1172 Äneas	1930 UA	Aeneas, Trojan prince	DMP · 1172
1173 Anchises	1930 UB	Anchises, mythological Trojan	DMP · 1173
1174 Marmara	1930 UC	Sea of Marmara	DMP · 1174
1175 Margo	1930 UD	Unknown origin of name	DMP · 1175
1176 Lucidor	1930 VE	Lucidor, amateur astronomer and friend of the discoverer Eugène Joseph Delporte	DMP · 1176
1177 Gonnessia	1930 WA	François Gonnessiat (1856–1934), French astronomer and director of the Algiers Observatory at Bouzaréah, Algeria	DMP · 1177
1178 Irmela	1931 EC	Irmela Ruska, wife of Ernst Ruska, German inventor of the electron microscope and Nobelist	DMP · 1178
1179 Mally	1931 FD	Daughter-in-law of discoverer, wife of Franz Wolf (presumably Max Wolf's brother)	DMP · 1179
1180 Rita	1931 GE	Unknown origin of name	DMP · 1180
1181 Lilith	1927 CQ	Lili Boulanger (1893–1918), French classical composer	DMP · 1181
1182 Ilona	1927 EA	Unknown origin of name	DMP · 1182
1183 Jutta	1930 DC	Unknown origin of name	DMP · 1183
1184 Gaea	1926 RE	Gaia, Greek goddess	DMP · 1184
1185 Nikko	1927 WC	Nikkō, Tochigi prefecture, Japan	DMP · 1185
1186 Turnera	1929 PL	Herbert Hall Turner (1861–1930), British astronomer	DMP · 1186
1187 Afra	1929 XC	Unknown origin of name	DMP · 1187
1188 Gothlandia	1930 SB	Ancient name of Catalonia	DMP · 1188
1189 Terentia	1930 SG	Lidiya Ivanovna Terenteva (1879–1933), Russian astronomer and orbit computer	DMP · 1189
1190 Pelagia	1930 SL	Pelageya Shajn (1894–1956), Russian astronomer and discoverer of minor planets	DMP · 1190
1191 Alfaterna	1931 CA	Nuceria Alfaterna, ancient city founded by the Oschi, between Pompeii and Salerno, now beneath Nocera Superiore, birthplace of Alfonso Fresa, Italian astronomer, who proposed the name	DMP · 1191
1192 Prisma	1931 FE	The Bergedorfer Spektralkatalog (an astronomical spectral catalogue), as prisms are one method of obtaining spectra	DMP · 1192
1193 Africa	1931 HB	Continent of Africa, in which Johannesburg with its discovering observatory is located	DMP · 1193
1194 Aletta	1931 JG	Wife of discoverer Cyril Jackson	DMP · 1194
1195 Orangia	1931 KD	Orange Province, South Africa, which is now the Free State Province	DMP · 1195
1196 Sheba	1931 KE	Queen of Sheba, Biblical character	DMP · 1196
1197 Rhodesia	1931 LD	Rhodesia, now Zimbabwe	DMP · 1197
1198 Atlantis	1931 RA	Atlantis, mythological land	DMP · 1198
1199 Geldonia	1931 RF	Latin name of Jodoigne, the birthplace of discoverer Eugène Joseph Delporte in Belgium	DMP · 1199
1200 Imperatrix	1931 RH	The Latin word for "Empress"	DMP · 1200

== 1201–1300 ==
back to top

Named minor planet	Provisional	This minor planet was named for...	Ref · Catalog
1201 Strenua	1931 RK	Latin Strenuus, "diligent, careful", virtues exemplified by Gustav Stracke, German astronomer and orbit computer, who had asked that no asteroid be named after him; also, the German translation of the Latin name, Stärke, sounds similar to Stracke. The asteroid was named without Stracke being aware of the meaning (see 1227 Geranium).	DMP · 1201
1202 Marina	1931 RL	Marina Davydovna Lavrova-Berg, who worked at Pulkovo Observatory in 1931–1942	DMP · 1202
1203 Nanna	1931 TA	Name of many paintings by the German painter Anselm Feuerbach, one of which was in the possession of the discoverer's family	DMP · 1203
1204 Renzia	1931 TE	Franz Robert Renz (1860–1942), German-Russian astronomer	DMP · 1204
1205 Ebella	1931 TB_{1}	Carl Wilhelm Ludwig Martin Ebell (1871–1944), German astronomer at Kiel Observatory (526)	DMP · 1205
1206 Numerowia	1931 UH	Boris Numerov (1891–1941), Russian astronomer	DMP · 1206
1207 Ostenia	1931 VT	Hans Osten, German amateur astronomer	DMP · 1207
1208 Troilus	1931 YA	Troilus, Trojan prince, killed by Achilles	DMP · 1208
1209 Pumma	1927 HA	Pumma, nickname of a niece of German astronomer Albrecht Kahrstedt (1897–1971), also see (1587)	DMP · 1209
1210 Morosovia	1931 LB	Nikolai Alexandrovich Morozov (1854–1946), Russian revolutionary	DMP · 1210
1211 Bressole	1931 XA	Bressole, nephew of discoverer Louis Boyer	DMP · 1211
1212 Francette	1931 XC	Francette, wife of discoverer Louis Boyer	DMP · 1212
1213 Algeria	1931 XD	Algeria	DMP · 1213
1214 Richilde	1932 AA	Unknown origin of name	DMP · 1214
1215 Boyer	1932 BA	Louis Boyer (1901–1999), French astronomer and discoverer of minor planets	DMP · 1215
1216 Askania	1932 BL	The "Askania-Werke", German optical and precision instrument makers	DMP · 1216
1217 Maximiliana	1932 EC	Max Wolf (1863–1932), German astronomer	DMP · 1217
1218 Aster	1932 BJ	Aster, a genus of Asteraceae flowering plants	DMP · 1218
1219 Britta	1932 CJ	Unknown origin of name	DMP · 1219
1220 Crocus	1932 CU	Crocus, a genus of Iridaceae flowering plants (possibly inspired by the provisional designation letters: Crocus)	DMP · 1220
1221 Amor	1932 EA_{1}	Amor, Roman god of love (the minor planet makes close approaches to Earth, like a lover)	DMP · 1221
1222 Tina	1932 LA	Amateur astronomer and friend of the discoverer	DMP · 1222
1223 Neckar	1931 TG	Neckar River, Germany, tributary of the Rhine	DMP · 1223
1224 Fantasia	1927 SD	The Latin word for fantasy	DMP · 1224
1225 Ariane	1930 HK	Ariane Leprieur, leading character of Gabriel Marcel's play Le Chemin de crête	DMP · 1225
1226 Golia	1930 HL	Jacobus Golius (1596–1667), Dutch orientalist who held the chair of Arabic, founder of the Sterrewacht Leiden (Leiden Observatory), who succeeded Willebrord Snell in the chair of Mathematics and Astronomy at the University of Leiden	DMP · 1226
1227 Geranium	1931 TD	Geranium, a genus of Geraniaceae flowering plants. The initials of the minor planets 1227 through 1234, all discovered by K. Reinmuth, spell out "G. Stracke", German astronomer and orbit computer, who had asked that no planet be named after him.	DMP · 1227
1228 Scabiosa	1931 TU	Scabiosa, a genus of Dipsacaceae flowering plants	DMP · 1228
1229 Tilia	1931 TP_{1}	Tilia, the linden and lime trees	DMP · 1229
1230 Riceia	1931 TX_{1}	Hugh Rice, American amateur astronomer from New York	DMP · 1230
1231 Auricula	1931 TE_{2}	Primula auricula, flowering plants	DMP · 1231
1232 Cortusa	1931 TF_{2}	Cortusa, a genus of Primulaceae flowering plants	DMP · 1232
1233 Kobresia	1931 TG_{2}	Kobresia, a genus of Cyperaceae plants (sedges)	DMP · 1233
1234 Elyna	1931 UF	Elyna, a genus of Cyperaceae plants (sedges)	DMP · 1234
1235 Schorria	1931 UJ	Richard Schorr (1867–1951), German astronomer	DMP · 1235
1236 Thaïs	1931 VX	Thaïs, an ancient Greek hetaera, who accompanied Alexander the Great (356–323 BC) during his campaigns	DMP · 1236
1237 Geneviève	1931 XB	Eldest daughter of discoverer	DMP · 1237
1238 Predappia	1932 CA	Predappio, Italy, birthplace of Benito Mussolini	DMP · 1238
1239 Queteleta	1932 CB	Adolphe Quetelet (1796–1874), Belgian mathematician, statistician, meteorologist, and astronomer, first director of the Royal Observatory of Belgium at Brussels	DMP · 1239
1240 Centenaria	1932 CD	In honour of the 100th anniversary of Hamburg Observatory	DMP · 1240
1241 Dysona	1932 EB_{1}	Frank Watson Dyson (1868–1939), British astronomer, director of Greenwich Observatory and president of the IAU 1928–1932	DMP · 1241
1242 Zambesia	1932 HL	Then-British territories of the Zambezi River Basin, Africa	DMP · 1242
1243 Pamela	1932 JE	Pamela, daughter of astronomer Cyril Jackson who discovered this minor planet	DMP · 1243
1244 Deira	1932 KE	Ancient name of Ossett, Yorkshire, the discoverer's birthplace (An exaggeration; in actuality, the ancient Kingdom of Deira encompassed most of modern Yorkshire)	DMP · 1244
1245 Calvinia	1932 KF	Calvinia, Cape Province, South Africa	DMP · 1245
1246 Chaka	1932 OA	Shaka (c. 1787–1828), king of the Zulus	DMP · 1246
1247 Memoria	1932 QA	Latin for "remembrance"; the discoverer was often reminded of her pleasant relationship while in Uccle in 1932	DMP · 1247
1248 Jugurtha	1932 RO	Jugurtha (c. 160–104 BC), Numidian king and enemy of Rome	DMP · 1248
1249 Rutherfordia	1932 VB	The city of Rutherford, New Jersey, which is an inner suburb of metropolitan New York City. The naming was proposed by Irving Meyer and endorsed by German astronomer Gustav Stracke who mentioned on a postcard in February 1937, that his American college, Meyer, who himself did not discover any asteroids, requested the naming after the city of Rutherford, where a private observatory was located at the time. The name is often incorrectly attributed to physicist and Nobelist Lord Rutherford	DMP · 1249
1250 Galanthus	1933 BD	Galanthus, the snowdrop	DMP · 1250
1251 Hedera	1933 BE	Hedera, the ivy	DMP · 1251
1252 Celestia	1933 DG	Celestia Whipple, mother of discoverer	DMP · 1252
1253 Frisia	1931 TV_{1}	Possibly the Latin name for Friesland and the teutonic tribe that gave its name to the area	DMP · 1253
1254 Erfordia	1932 JA	Erfurt, Germany, birthplace of the discoverer	DMP · 1254
1255 Schilowa	1932 NC	Mariya Vasilyevna Zhilova (1870–1934), also known as M. W. Shilowa, Russian astronomer and orbit computer	DMP · 1255
1256 Normannia	1932 PD	"Possibly named for the inhabitants of Normandy"	DMP · 1256
1257 Móra	1932 PE	Károly Móra (1899–1938, also called Károly Mórawetz), Hungarian astronomer, who succeeded Antal Tass as director of the Konkoly Observatory	DMP · 1257
1258 Sicilia	1932 PG	Sicily, Italy	DMP · 1258
1259 Ógyalla	1933 BT	Ógyalla, in Hungary, site of the Konkoly Observatory, then also called the Ógyalla Observatory	DMP · 1259
1260 Walhalla	1933 BW	Walhalla Memorial Hall, near Regensburg, Germany	DMP · 1260
1261 Legia	1933 FB	Latin for Liège, Belgium	DMP · 1261
1262 Sniadeckia	1933 FE	Jan Śniadecki (1756–1830), Polish scholar, professor of mathematics and astronomy, founder of the Kraków Observatory (055)	DMP · 1262
1263 Varsavia	1933 FF	Latin name of Warsaw, capital of Poland	DMP · 1263
1264 Letaba	1933 HG	Letaba River, Transvaal, South Africa	DMP · 1264
1265 Schweikarda	1911 MV	Maiden name (Schweikard) of discoverer's mother	DMP · 1265
1266 Tone	1927 BD	Tone River, Kantō region, largest river of Japan	DMP · 1266
1267 Geertruida	1930 HD	Geertruida, sister of Dutch astronomer Gerrit Pels at Leiden Observatory, who named this asteroid and computed its orbit	DMP · 1267
1268 Libya	1930 HJ	Libya, country in northern Africa bordering the Mediterranean sea	DMP · 1268
1269 Rollandia	1930 SH	Romain Rolland (1866–1944), French writer	DMP · 1269
1270 Datura	1930 YE	Datura stramonium, the thorn apple	DMP · 1270
1271 Isergina	1931 TN	Pyotr Vasilyevich Isergin, doctor, a friend of the discoverer (who was treated by him)	DMP · 1271
1272 Gefion	1931 TZ_{1}	Gefjun (Gefion) Fountain, Copenhagen, Denmark	DMP · 1272
1273 Helma	1932 PF	Helma, an acquaintance of German astronomer W. Schaub	DMP · 1273
1274 Delportia	1932 WC	Eugène Delporte (1882–1955), Belgian astronomer and discoverer of minor planets	DMP · 1274
1275 Cimbria	1932 WG	The Cimbrians, encountered by the Romans in Noricum, 2nd century BC	DMP · 1275
1276 Ucclia	1933 BA	Named for the city of Uccle and for the Royal Observatory of Belgium situated there	DMP · 1276
1277 Dolores	1933 HA	Dolores Ibárruri (1895–1989), Spanish political leader	DMP · 1277
1278 Kenya	1933 LA	Kenya, African country	DMP · 1278
1279 Uganda	1933 LB	Uganda, African country	DMP · 1279
1280 Baillauda	1933 QB	Jules Baillaud (1876–1960), French astronomer	DMP · 1280
1281 Jeanne	1933 QJ	Jeanne, daughter of discoverer Sylvain Arend	DMP · 1281
1282 Utopia	1933 QM_{1}	Utopia, mythical place	DMP · 1282
1283 Komsomolia	1925 SC	Komsomol, the Soviet youth organization	DMP · 1283
1284 Latvia	1933 OP	Latvia, country in the Baltic region of Northern Europe	DMP · 1284
1285 Julietta	1933 QF	Julietta, mother of discoverer Eugène Joseph Delporte	DMP · 1285
1286 Banachiewicza	1933 QH	Tadeusz Banachiewicz (1882–1954), Polish astronomer, director of the Kraków Observatory	DMP · 1286
1287 Lorcia	1933 QL	Lorcia, wife of Polish astronomer Tadeusz Banachiewicz	DMP · 1287
1288 Santa	1933 QM	Santa, unknown origin of name. The name was given by Italian astronomer E. de Caro, who computed this asteroid's orbit	DMP · 1288
1289 Kutaïssi	1933 QR	Kutaïssi, city in the Republic of Georgia	DMP · 1289
1290 Albertine	1933 QL_{1}	Albert I of Belgium (1875–1934), King of Belgium, who died shortly after the asteroid's discovery	DMP · 1290
1291 Phryne	1933 RA	Phryne, a hetaera of the 4th century BC, celebrated for her beauty	DMP · 1291
1292 Luce	1933 SH	Luce, wife of discoverer Fernand Rigaux	DMP · 1292
1293 Sonja	1933 SO	Sonja, unknown origin of name. The name was proposed by ARI and may be inspired by the asteroids provisional designation containing "SO".	DMP · 1293
1294 Antwerpia	1933 UB_{1}	Antwerp, Belgium	DMP · 1294
1295 Deflotte	1933 WD	Deflotte, nephew of discoverer Louis Boyer	DMP · 1295
1296 Andrée	1933 WE	Andrée, niece of discoverer Louis Boyer	DMP · 1296
1297 Quadea	1934 AD	Parents-in-law of E. Reinmuth, brother of discoverer Karl Reinmuth	DMP · 1297
1298 Nocturna	1934 AE	"Nocturna" is the feminine adjective of "nocturnus", "nightly"	DMP · 1298
1299 Mertona	1934 BA	Gerald Merton (1893–1983), English astronomer	DMP · 1299
1300 Marcelle	1934 CL	Marcelle, the second daughter of French astronomer Guy Reiss who discovered this minor planet	DMP · 1300

== 1301–1400 ==
back to top

Named minor planet	Provisional	This minor planet was named for...	Ref · Catalog
1301 Yvonne	1934 EA	Yvonne Boyer, sister of discoverer Louis Boyer	DMP · 1301
1302 Werra	1924 SV	Werra River, Germany	DMP · 1302
1303 Luthera	1928 FP	Robert Luther (1822–1900), German astronomer and discoverer of minor planets	DMP · 1303
1304 Arosa	1928 KC	Arosa, mountain village and tourist resort in Switzerland	DMP · 1304
1305 Pongola	192148 OC	Pongola River, South Africa	DMP · 1305
1306 Scythia	1930 OB	Scythia, ancient Russian region	DMP · 1306
1307 Cimmeria	1930 UF	Cimmeria, ancient Ukrainian region around Crimea	DMP · 1307
1308 Halleria	1931 EB	Albrecht von Haller (1708–1777), Swiss physician, botanist and poet	DMP · 1308
1309 Hyperborea	1931 TO	Hyperborea, mythical land	DMP · 1309
1310 Villigera	1932 DB	Walter A. Villiger (1872–1938), Swiss astronomer, head of the department of astronomical instruments of Carl Zeiss, Jena	DMP · 1310
1311 Knopfia	1933 FF_{1}	Otto Knopf (1856–1945), German astronomer at Jena, Germany	DMP · 1311
1312 Vassar	1933 OT	Vassar College, where the orbit computer (American astronomer Maud Worcester Makemson) taught	DMP · 1312
1313 Berna	1933 QG	Bern, capital of Switzerland, named at the request of Sigmund Mauderli, the orbit's computer	DMP · 1313
1314 Paula	1933 SC	Paula, wife of Belgian astronomer Sylvain Arend who discovered this minor planet	DMP · 1314
1315 Bronislawa	1933 SF_{1}	Bronislava of Poland Blessed Bronisława Ordowaz (c1204–1259) a Polish Roman Catholic nun	DMP · 1315
1316 Kasan	1933 WC	Kazan, Russia, on the Volga	DMP · 1316
1317 Silvretta	1935 RC	Silvretta, a mountain range in the Alps	DMP · 1317
1318 Nerina	1934 FG	Nerine, a genus of Amaryllidaceae flowering plants	DMP · 1318
1319 Disa	1934 FO	The showy, large tropical terrestrial orchid genus Disa	DMP · 1319
1320 Impala	1934 JG	The impala antelope	DMP · 1320
1321 Majuba	1934 JH	Amajuba, a mountain in northern Natal, part of the Drakensberg range, South Africa, site of the Battle of Majuba Hill	DMP · 1321
1322 Coppernicus	1934 LA	Nicolaus Copernicus (1473–1543), Polish astronomer	DMP · 1322
1323 Tugela	1934 LD	Tugela River, Natal, South Africa	DMP · 1323
1324 Knysna	1934 LL	Knysna, town in the Western Cape Province of South Africa	DMP · 1324
1325 Inanda	1934 NR	Inanda, Zulu village in South Africa	DMP · 1325
1326 Losaka	1934 NS	Lusaka, Zambia (then North Rhodesia)	DMP · 1326
1327 Namaqua	1934 RT	Namaqua, coastal region of South-West Africa	DMP · 1327
1328 Devota	1925 UA	Fortunato Devoto, Argentine astronomer, director of the La Plata Observatory and president of the National Council of Observatories of Argentina. He was a friend of the discoverer Benjamin Jekhowsky	DMP · 1328
1329 Eliane	1933 FL	Éliane, daughter of Paul Bourgeois, Belgian astronomer	DMP · 1329
1330 Spiridonia	1925 DB	Spiridon Zaslavsky (1883–1942), brother-in-law of Russian discoverer Vladimir Albitsky	DMP · 1330
1331 Solvejg	1933 QS	Character in Peer Gynt, drama by Norwegian playwright Henrik Ibsen	DMP · 1331
1332 Marconia	1934 AA	Guglielmo Marconi (1874–1937), Italian radio pioneer, physicist, and Nobel Prize winner	DMP · 1332
1333 Cevenola	1934 DA	The Cévennes, mountainous region of southern France	DMP · 1333
1334 Lundmarka	1934 OB	Knut Lundmark (1889–1958), Swedish astronomer	DMP · 1334
1335 Demoulina	1934 RE	Prof. Demoulin, Belgian astronomer, of the University of Ghent	DMP · 1335
1336 Zeelandia	1934 RW	Latin name for Zeeland, in the Southwest Netherlands	DMP · 1336
1337 Gerarda	1934 RA_{1}	Gerarda Pels, wife of Dutch astronomer Gerrit Pels, who was a computational assistant at Leiden Observatory	DMP · 1337
1338 Duponta	1934 XA	Marc Dupont, nephew of the discoverer Louis Boyer	DMP · 1338
1339 Désagneauxa	1934 XB	Brother-in-law of the discoverer Louis Boyer	DMP · 1339
1340 Yvette	1934 YA	Yvette, niece of the discoverer Louis Boyer	DMP · 1340
1341 Edmée	1935 BA	Édmée Chandon (1885–1944), French astronomer	DMP · 1341
1342 Brabantia	1935 CV	Latin name of the province of Brabant, Belgium and The Netherlands, whose capital is Brussels	DMP · 1342
1343 Nicole	1935 FC	Niece of the discoverer	DMP · 1343
1344 Caubeta	1935 GA	Paul Caubet, French astronomer at the Toulouse Observatory	DMP · 1344
1345 Potomac	1908 CG	Potomac River, USA	DMP · 1345
1346 Gotha	1929 CY	Gotha, Thuringia, Germany, location of the old Gotha Observatory (Sternwarte Gotha or Seeberg-Sternwarte) established by Duke Ernst I of Saxe-Coburg and whose first director was Franz Xaver von Zach	DMP · 1346
1347 Patria	1931 VW	Latin for "fatherland"	DMP · 1347
1348 Michel	1933 FD	Michel Arend, older son of the discoverer	DMP · 1348
1349 Bechuana	1934 LJ	Bechuana Province of central South Africa, which became Bechuanaland, then Botswana	DMP · 1349
1350 Rosselia	1934 TA	Marie-Thérèse Rossel (1910–1987), editor of the Belgian newspaper Le Soir (1946+)	DMP · 1350
1351 Uzbekistania	1934 TF	Uzbekistan, then the Uzbek Soviet Socialist Republic, where the discoverer resided; the name was found posthumously, handwritten in the discoverer's personal copy of Kleine Planeten für 1941	DMP · 1351
1352 Wawel	1935 CE	Wawel Castle, Kraków, Poland, also seat of the Wawel Cathedral	DMP · 1352
1353 Maartje	1935 CU	Maartje Mekking (1924–2007), daughter of B. G. Mekking (1903–1971), a Dutch computational assistant at Leiden Observatory	DMP · 1353
1354 Botha	1935 GK	Louis Botha (1862–1919), first prime minister of the Union of South Africa	DMP · 1354
1355 Magoeba	1935 HE	Magoeba, native chief of the North Transvaal, South Africa	DMP · 1355
1356 Nyanza	1935 JH	Nyanza Province, Kenya	DMP · 1356
1357 Khama	1935 ND	Khama III (c. 1837–1923), king of the Bechuana in South Africa	DMP · 1357
1358 Gaika	1935 OB	Ngqika (a.k.a. Gaika), Xhosa chief of Transkei, South Africa (then British Kaffraria)	MPC · 1358
1359 Prieska	1935 OC	Prieska village, Cape Province, South Africa	DMP · 1359
1360 Tarka	1935 OD	Tarka, chief of Transkei, South Africa, who also gave his name to the town of Tarkastad	DMP · 1360
1361 Leuschneria	1935 QA	Armin Otto Leuschner (1868–1953), American astronomer, head of the Department of Astronomy of the University of California at Berkeley	DMP · 1361
1362 Griqua	1935 QG_{1}	Griqua tribe of Griqualand, South Africa	DMP · 1362
1363 Herberta	1935 RA	Herbert Hoover (1874–1964), American president, earlier president of the Commission for Relief in Belgium (1915–1919); named in his honour after his 1938 visit to Belgium	DMP · 1363
1364 Safara	1935 VB	André Safar of Algiers	DMP · 1364
1365 Henyey	1928 RK	Louis G. Henyey (1910–1970), American astronomer	DMP · 1365
1366 Piccolo	1932 WA	Auguste Cauvin, a.k.a. d'Arsac, editor-in-chief of the Brussels newspaper Le Soir (c. 1898 – 1937). "Piccolo" means "small" in Italian and was his pseudonym.	DMP · 1366
1367 Nongoma	1934 NA	Nongoma, capital city of the KwaZulu homeland, South Africa	DMP · 1367
1368 Numidia	1935 HD	Numidia, ancient North African kingdom and Roman province	DMP · 1368
1369 Ostanina	1935 QB	Ostanin, a small village in located in the Solikamsky District of the Perm Governorate, what is now Russia	MPC · 1369
1370 Hella	1935 QG	Helene Nowacki (1904–1972), a German astronomer at ARI	DMP · 1370
1371 Resi	1935 QJ	Cousin of Mrs. Schaub, acquaintance of the discoverer	DMP · 1371
1372 Haremari	1935 QK	In honour of all the women who worked at the Astronomisches Rechen-Institut: "Harem ARI"	DMP · 1372
1373 Cincinnati	1935 QN	Cincinnati Observatory, whose staff did most of the orbit computations	DMP · 1373
1374 Isora	1935 UA	Female name "Rosi" spelled backwards. The name was chosen by German astronomer Gustav Stracke.	DMP · 1374
1375 Alfreda	1935 UB	Alfreda, a friend of the discoverer Eugène Delporte	DMP · 1375
1376 Michelle	1935 UH	Michelle Boyer, third daughter of the discoverer Louis Boyer	DMP · 1376
1377 Roberbauxa	1936 CD	Robert Baux (1900–1987), French engineer, childhood friend of the discoverer	DMP · 1377
1378 Leonce	1936 DB	Léonce Rigaux, father of the discoverer	DMP · 1378
1379 Lomonosowa	1936 FC	Mikhail Lomonosov (1711–1765), Russian polymath	DMP · 1379
1380 Volodia	1936 FM	Vladimir Vesselovsky (born 1936), born the night of the asteroid's discovery (Volodya is a diminutive of Vladimir)	DMP · 1380
1381 Danubia	1930 QJ	Danube River	DMP · 1381
1382 Gerti	1925 BB	Gertrud Höhne (or Hoehne), secretary at the Astronomisches Rechen-Institut in Berlin, Germany	DMP · 1382
1383 Limburgia	1934 RV	Latin name for the province of Limburg	DMP · 1383
1384 Kniertje	1934 RX	"Kniertje" is the main character in the drama Op Hoop van Zegen by Dutch journalist and dramatist Herman Heijermans	DMP · 1384
1385 Gelria	1935 MJ	"Gelria", Latin name for the Dutch province of Gelderland	DMP · 1385
1386 Storeria	1935 PA	Norman Wyman Storer, American professor of astronomy at the University of Kansas, teacher to the orbit computer	DMP · 1386
1387 Kama	1935 QD	Kama River, tributary to the Volga, east of Kazan	DMP · 1387
1388 Aphrodite	1935 SS	Aphrodite, Greek goddess	DMP · 1388
1389 Onnie	1935 SS_{1}	A. Kruyt, sister-in-law of Dutch astronomer Gerrit Pels, who was a computational assistant at Leiden Observatory	DMP · 1389
1390 Abastumani	1935 TA	Abastumani, city in the Republic of Georgia and location of the Georgian National Astrophysical Observatory (Abastumani Observatory)	DMP · 1390
1391 Carelia	1936 DA	Latin name of Karelia, Finland	DMP · 1391
1392 Pierre	1936 FO	Nephew of discoverer	DMP · 1392
1393 Sofala	1936 KD	Sofala Province, Mozambique	DMP · 1393
1394 Algoa	1936 LK	Algoa Bay, South Africa	MPC · 1394
1395 Aribeda	1936 OB	Abbreviation of Astronomisches Rechen-Institut, Berlin Dahlem	DMP · 1395
1396 Outeniqua	1936 PF	Outeniqua Mountains, in south western Cape Province, South Africa	DMP · 1396
1397 Umtata	1936 PG	Umtata, capital of Transkei, South Africa	DMP · 1397
1398 Donnera	1936 QL	Anders Donner (1854–1938), Finnish astronomer, director of the Helsinki Observatory	DMP · 1398
1399 Teneriffa	1936 QY	Tenerife, Canary Islands	DMP · 1399
1400 Tirela	1936 WA	Charles Tirel, friend of the discoverer Louis Boyer	DMP · 1400

== 1401–1500 ==
back to top

Named minor planet	Provisional	This minor planet was named for...	Ref · Catalog
1401 Lavonne	1935 UD	Lavonne, granddaughter of American astronomer Maud Worcester Makemson (1891–1977), who computed the asteroid's orbit	DMP · 1401
1402 Eri	1936 OC	Erika Schattschneider-Kollnig (1913–1978), German astronomer at Heidelberg Observatory	DMP · 1402
1403 Idelsonia	1936 QA	Naum Idelson (1885–1951), Soviet astronomer at the Pulkovo Observatory	DMP · 1403
1404 Ajax	1936 QW	Ajax, mythological Greek warrior	DMP · 1404
1405 Sibelius	1936 RE	Jean Sibelius (1865–1957), Finnish composer and violinist	MPC · 1405
1406 Komppa	1936 RF	Gustaf Komppa (1867–1949), Finnish chemist known for the industrial synthesis of camphor. He was a chancellor of the University of Turku and co-founder of the Turku Observatory	DMP · 1406
1407 Lindelöf	1936 WC	Ernst Leonard Lindelöf (1870–1946), Finnish mathematician	DMP · 1407
1408 Trusanda	1936 WF	Trude Hichgesand, an acquaintance of Heidelberg astronomer Heinrich Vogt see 1439 Vogtia	DMP · 1408
1409 Isko	1937 AK	Ise Koch, wife of German astronomer Fritz Kubach (1912–1945)^{(de)}	DMP · 1409
1410 Margret	1937 AL	Margret Braun (died 1991), wife of Heinrich Vogt, German astronomer	DMP · 1410
1411 Brauna	1937 AM	Margret Braun (died 1991), wife of Heinrich Vogt, German astronomer	DMP · 1411
1412 Lagrula	1937 BA	Joanny-Philippe Lagrula (1870–1941), French astronomer, at one time director of the Algiers Observatory	DMP · 1412
1413 Roucarie	1937 CD	Roucarie Boyer, mother of French discoverer Louis Boyer	DMP · 1413
1414 Jérôme	1937 CE	Jérôme Boyer, father of French discoverer Louis Boyer	DMP · 1414
1415 Malautra	1937 EA	Malautra Boyer, wife of French discoverer Louis Boyer	DMP · 1415
1416 Renauxa	1937 EC	P. Renaux, a French astronomer who worked as an assistant at the Algiers Observatory	DMP · 1416
1417 Walinskia	1937 GH	Walinskia, an acquaintance of an astronomer at ARI, Berlin	DMP · 1417
1418 Fayeta	1903 RG	Gaston-Jules Fayet (1874–1967), French astronomer and director of the Nice Observatory	DMP · 1418
1419 Danzig	1929 RF	The city of Gdańsk (German: Danzig) in Poland	DMP · 1419
1420 Radcliffe	1931 RJ	Radcliffe College in Cambridge, Massachusetts, in honour of the class of 1912	DMP · 1420
1421 Esperanto	1936 FQ	The Esperanto language	DMP · 1421
1422 Strömgrenia	1936 QF	Elis Strömgren (1870–1947), Swedish-born Danish astronomer, director of the Copenhagen University Observatory and the Bureau central des télégrammes astronomiques (and father of Bengt Georg Daniel Strömgren, Danish astronomer)	DMP · 1422
1423 Jose	1936 QM	Giuseppina Bianchi, deceased young daughter of Italian astronomer Emilio Bianchi	DMP · 1423
1424 Sundmania	1937 AJ	Karl F. Sundman (1873–1949), Finnish mathematician, director of the Helsinki Observatory	DMP · 1424
1425 Tuorla	1937 GB	Tuorla Observatory, Finland, then the Research Institute for Astronomy and Optics	DMP · 1425
1426 Riviera	1937 GF	The French Riviera, on the Mediterranean coast of France and the location of the discovering Nice Observatory	DMP · 1426
1427 Ruvuma	1937 KB	Ruvuma River, Tanzania	DMP · 1427
1428 Mombasa	1937 NO	Mombasa, Kenya	DMP · 1428
1429 Pemba	1937 NH	Pemba Island, Tanzania	DMP · 1429
1430 Somalia	1937 NK	Somalia, a country in the Horn of Africa	MPC · 1430
1431 Luanda	1937 OB	Luanda, Angola	MPC · 1431
1432 Ethiopia	1937 PG	Ethiopia (then called Abyssinia), a country in the Horn of Africa	DMP · 1432
1433 Geramtina	1937 UC	Miss Asplind, sister of Swedish astronomer Bror Asplind (1890–1954), see 958 Asplinda	DMP · 1433
1434 Margot	1936 FD_{1}	Gertrud Margot Görsdorf (1915–1990), friend of astronomer Wilhelm Gliese	DMP · 1434
1435 Garlena	1936 WE	Acquaintance of Prof. W. Schaub, German orbit computer	DMP · 1435
1436 Salonta	1936 YA	Salonta, town in what is now Romania, and place of birth of the discoverer, the Hungarian astronomer György Kulin (1905–1989)	MPC · 1436
1437 Diomedes	1937 PB	Diomedes, mythological Greek warrior involved in the Trojan War	DMP · 1437
1438 Wendeline	1937 TC	Unknown origin of name	DMP · 1438
1439 Vogtia	1937 TE	Heinrich Vogt (1890–1968), German astronomer	DMP · 1439
1440 Rostia	1937 TF	Johann Leonhard Rost (1688–1727), German astronomer and author of the Atlas Portatilis Coelistis	DMP · 1440
1441 Bolyai	1937 WA	János Bolyai (1802–1860), Hungarian mathematician	DMP · 1441
1442 Corvina	1937 YF	Matthias Corvinus (1443–1490), King of Hungary. His library, the Bibliotheca Corviniana, was second in size and significance to the Vatican library	DMP · 1442
1443 Ruppina	1937 YG	Ruppin, Germany city and birthplace of astronomer Carl Ebell, see 1205 Ebella	DMP · 1443
1444 Pannonia	1938 AE	Pannonia, the ancient Roman province which is largely co-extensive with the modern Transdanubia region in Hungary	MPC · 1444
1445 Konkolya	1938 AF	Nicolaus von Konkoly Thege (Thege Miklós Konkoly; 1842–1916), Hungarian founder of the Ó-Gyalla Observatory, now known as the Hurbanovo Geomagnetic Observatory, Slovakia	DMP · 1445
1446 Sillanpää	1938 BA	Frans Eemil Sillanpää (1888–1964), Finnish author, winner of the 1939 Nobel Prize for Literature	MPC · 1446
1447 Utra	1938 BB	The northeastern Finnish town of Utra, birthplace of the discoverer Yrjö Väisälä	DMP · 1447
1448 Lindbladia	1938 DF	Bertil Lindblad (1895–1965), Swedish astronomer and former IAU president	DMP · 1448
1449 Virtanen	1938 DO	Artturi Ilmari Virtanen (1895–1973), Finnish biochemist, winner of the 1945 Nobel Prize for Chemistry	MPC · 1449
1450 Raimonda	1938 DP	Jean Jacques Raimond (1903–1961), Dutch astronomer and former president of the Royal Dutch Meteorological and Astronomical Society and director of the Zeiss planetarium in The Hague	DMP · 1450
1451 Granö	1938 DT	Johannes Gabriel Granö (1882–1956), Finnish geographer, explorer, and chancellor of Turku University	DMP · 1451
1452 Hunnia	1938 DZ_{1}	Literally, land of the Huns (the state founded by Attila the Hun) but used as a stylistic alternative for Hungary or Magyarország, or as a stylistic synonym for the land lying east of the Danube	MPC · 1452
1453 Fennia	1938 ED_{1}	Latin name for Finland	DMP · 1453
1454 Kalevala	1936 DO	Kalevala, the Finnish epic poem	MPC · 1454
1455 Mitchella	1937 LF	Maria Mitchell (1818–1889), American astronomer	DMP · 1455
1456 Saldanha	1937 NG	Saldanha harbour, South Africa	MPC · 1456
1457 Ankara	1937 PA	The city of Ankara, capital of Turkey	DMP · 1457
1458 Mineura	1937 RC	Adolphe Mineur, Belgian mathematician and professor at the University of Brussels	DMP · 1458
1459 Magnya	1937 VA	"Magnya", means "clear, bright, wonderful", when translated from Latin to Russian	DMP · 1459
1460 Haltia	1937 WC	Haltitunturi mountain or possibly haltia, Finnish word for elf	MPC · 1460
1461 Jean-Jacques	1937 YL	Jean-Jacques Laugier, son of French discoverer Marguerite Laugier	DMP · 1461
1462 Zamenhof	1938 CA	L. L. Zamenhof (1859–1917), Polish physician and linguist, inventor of Esperanto	DMP · 1462
1463 Nordenmarkia	1938 CB	Nils Viktor Emanuel Nordenmark (1867–1962), Swedish astronomer	DMP · 1463
1464 Armisticia	1939 VO	The Armistice of 11 November 1918 (World War I), on the occasion of its 21st anniversary, in the hope of a continuation of world peace	DMP · 1464
1465 Autonoma	1938 FA	"Autonoma", short for the Universidad Autonoma de El Salvador, in recognition of the hospitality granted to the Hamburg Observatory	DMP · 1465
1466 Mündleria	1938 KA	Max Mündler (1876–1969), German astronomer at Heidelberg Observatory	DMP · 1466
1467 Mashona	1938 OE	Mashona people of Zimbabwe (then Rhodesia)	DMP · 1467
1468 Zomba	1938 PA	The city of Zomba in Malawi (then Nyassaland), Africa	DMP · 1468
1469 Linzia	1938 QD	The city of Linz, Austria	DMP · 1469
1470 Carla	1938 SD	Carla Ziegler, friend of German discoverer Alfred Bohrmann	DMP · 1470
1471 Tornio	1938 SL_{1}	The city of Tornio, in Lapland, Finland	MPC · 1471
1472 Muonio	1938 UQ	Muonio, town in northern Finland, above the Arctic Circle	MPC · 1472
1473 Ounas	1938 UT	Ounasjoki River in Finland	MPC · 1473
1474 Beira	1935 QY	The city of Beira, Mozambique, in southeast Africa	DMP · 1474
1475 Yalta	1935 SM	The city of Yalta, on south coast of the Crimean Peninsula	DMP · 1475
1476 Cox	1936 RA	Jacques Cox (1898–1972), Belgian astronomer and professor of astronomy at the University of Brussels	MPC · 1476
1477 Bonsdorffia	1938 CC	Ilmari Bonsdorff (1879–1950), Finnish astronomer and founder of the Finnish Geodetic Institute	DMP · 1477
1478 Vihuri	1938 CF	A. Vihuri, Finnish ship owner and patron of the arts and sciences	DMP · 1478
1479 Inkeri	1938 DE	The region of Ingria, now in Russia. "Inkeri" is also the first name of the granddaughter and niece of Finnish discoverer Yrjö Väisälä	DMP · 1479
1480 Aunus	1938 DK	Russian town of Olonets (Finnish: Aunus) in Karelia. It is also named after the grandson of discoverer Yrjö Väisälä	DMP · 1480
1481 Tübingia	1938 DR	The German city of Tübingen, birthplace of astronomer Johannes Kepler	DMP · 1481
1482 Sebastiana	1938 DA_{1}	Sebastian Finsterwalder, German	DMP · 1482
1483 Hakoila	1938 DJ_{1}	Kosti Johannes Hakoila (1898–), Finnish astronomer and assistant of the discoverer Yrjö Väisälä	DMP · 1483
1484 Postrema	1938 HC	"Postrema" (Latin: "last") for the last discovery made by Grigory Neujmin (this would not remain true)	DMP · 1484
1485 Isa	1938 OB	"Isa", diminutive of the Italian name "Marisa"	DMP · 1485
1486 Marilyn	1938 QA	Marilyn Herget, daughter of Paul Herget, American astronomer	DMP · 1486
1487 Boda	1938 WC	Karl Boda (1889–1942), German astronomer	DMP · 1487
1488 Aura	1938 XE	Aura River, Finland	MPC · 1488
1489 Attila	1939 GC	Attila (c. 406–453), king of the Huns and one of the most feared enemies of the Western and Eastern Roman Empires	MPC · 1489
1490 Limpopo	1936 LB	Limpopo River, Africa	DMP · 1490
1491 Balduinus	1938 EJ	Latin form of the name Baldwin, in this case referring to King Baudouin of Belgium	DMP · 1491
1492 Oppolzer	1938 FL	Theodor von Oppolzer (1841–1886), Austrian astronomer	DMP · 1492
1493 Sigrid	1938 QB	Sigrid Strömgren, wife of Danish-American astronomer Bengt Strömgren	DMP · 1493
1494 Savo	1938 SJ	Savonia, historical province of Finland	DMP · 1494
1495 Helsinki	1938 SW	The city of Helsinki, capital of Finland	MPC · 1495
1496 Turku	1938 SA_{1}	The city of Turku, Finland, home to the discoverer Yrjö Väisälä	DMP · 1496
1497 Tampere	1938 SB_{1}	The city of Tampere, Finland	MPC · 1497
1498 Lahti	1938 SK_{1}	The city of Lahti, Finland	MPC · 1498
1499 Pori	1938 UF	The city of Pori, Finland	MPC · 1499
1500 Jyväskylä	1938 UH	The city of Jyväskylä, Finland	MPC · 1500

== 1501–1600 ==
back to top

Named minor planet	Provisional	This minor planet was named for...	Ref · Catalog
1501 Baade	1938 UJ	Walter Baade (1893–1960), German astronomer	DMP · 1501
1502 Arenda	1938 WB	Sylvain Arend (1902–1992), Belgian astronomer	DMP · 1502
1503 Kuopio	1938 XD	Kuopio, Finland	MPC · 1503
1504 Lappeenranta	1939 FM	Lappeenranta, Finland	MPC · 1504
1505 Koranna	1939 HH	The Koranna, a tribe of San people from the Kalahari Desert	DMP · 1505
1506 Xosa	1939 JC	Xhosa people of Africa	DMP · 1506
1507 Vaasa	1939 RD	Vaasa, Finland	MPC · 1507
1508 Kemi	1938 UP	Kemi, Finland	MPC · 1508
1509 Esclangona	1938 YG	Ernest Esclangon (1876–1954), French astronomer	DMP · 1509
1510 Charlois	1939 DC	Auguste Charlois (1864–1910), French astronomer	DMP · 1510
1511 Daléra	1939 FB	Paul Daléra, friend of discoverer	DMP · 1511
1512 Oulu	1939 FE	Oulu, Finland, birthplace of discoverer	DMP · 1512
1513 Mátra	1940 EB	Mátra, a mountain range in Hungary	MPC · 1513
1514 Ricouxa	1906 UR	Unknown origin of name	DMP · 1514
1515 Perrotin	1936 VG	Joseph Athanase Perrotin (1845–1904), French astronomer	DMP · 1515
1516 Henry	1938 BG	Paul Henry and Prosper Henry (1848–1905 and 1849–1903) French astronomers	DMP · 1516
1517 Beograd	1938 FD	Belgrade, Serbia, discoverer's native city	DMP · 1517
1518 Rovaniemi	1938 UA	Rovaniemi, Finland	MPC · 1518
1519 Kajaani	1938 UB	Kajaani, Finland	MPC · 1519
1520 Imatra	1938 UY	Imatra, Finland	MPC · 1520
1521 Seinäjoki	1938 UB_{1}	Seinäjoki, Finland	MPC · 1521
1522 Kokkola	1938 WO	Kokkola, Finland	MPC · 1522
1523 Pieksämäki	1939 BC	Pieksämäki, Finland	MPC · 1523
1524 Joensuu	1939 SB	Joensuu, Finland	MPC · 1524
1525 Savonlinna	1939 SC	Savonlinna, Finland	MPC · 1525
1526 Mikkeli	1939 TF	Mikkeli, Finland	MPC · 1526
1527 Malmquista	1939 UG	Gunnar Malmquist (1893–1982), Swedish astronomer	DMP · 1527
1528 Conrada	1940 CA	Fritz Conrad (1883–1944), admiral in the German Navy during World War II	DMP · 1528
1529 Oterma	1938 BC	Liisi Oterma (1915–2001), Finnish astronomer and discoverer of minor planets	MPC · 1529
1530 Rantaseppä	1938 SG	Hilkka Rantaseppä (1925–1975), Finnish astronomer	MPC · 1530
1531 Hartmut	1938 SH	Hartmut Neckel, grandson of discoverer	MPC · 1531
1532 Inari	1938 SM	Lake Inari, Finland	MPC · 1532
1533 Saimaa	1939 BD	Lake Saimaa, Finland	MPC · 1533
1534 Näsi	1939 BK	Lake Näsi, Finland	MPC · 1534
1535 Päijänne	1939 RC	Lake Päijänne, in Päijänne National Park, Finland	MPC · 1535
1536 Pielinen	1939 SE	Lake Pielinen, in Koli National Park, Finland	MPC · 1536
1537 Transylvania	1940 QA	Transylvania, Romania	MPC · 1537
1538 Detre	1940 RF	László Detre (1906–1974), Hungarian astronomer	MPC · 1538
1539 Borrelly	1940 UB	Alphonse Borrelly (1842–1926), French astronomer and discoverer of minor planets	DMP · 1539
1540 Kevola	1938 WK	Kevola, Kevola Observatory in Finland operated by Hilkka Rantaseppä	MPC · 1540
1541 Estonia	1939 CK	Estonia	DMP · 1541
1542 Schalén	1941 QE	Carl Schalén, Swedish astronomer at the Lund Institute of Astronomy	MPC · 1542
1543 Bourgeois	1941 SJ	Paul Bourgeois (1898–1974), Belgian astronomer and discoverer of minor planets	MPC · 1543
1544 Vinterhansenia	1941 UK	Julie Vinter Hansen (1890–1960), Danish astronomer	DMP · 1544
1545 Thernöe	1941 UW	Karl August Thernöe (1911–1987), Danish astronomer at Copenhagen Observatory, popularizer of astronomy, and director of IAU's Central Bureau for Astronomical Telegrams (Src)	MPC · 1545
1546 Izsák	1941 SG_{1}	Imre Izsák (1929–1965), Hungarian astronomer	MPC · 1546
1547 Nele	1929 CZ	Nele, wife of folk-hero Till Eulenspiegel	DMP · 1547
1548 Palomaa	1935 FK	Matti Herman Palomaa (1871–1947), Finnish chemist at the University of Turku	DMP · 1548
1549 Mikko	1937 GA	Mikko Arthur Levander, Finnish pastor, amateur astronomer, and father-in-law of discoverer	DMP · 1549
1550 Tito	1937 WD	Josip Broz Tito (1892–1980), Yugoslav leader	DMP · 1550
1551 Argelander	1938 DC_{1}	Friedrich Wilhelm Argelander (1799–1875), German astronomer	DMP · 1551
1552 Bessel	1938 DE_{1}	Friedrich Bessel (1784–1846), German astronomer and mathematician	DMP · 1552
1553 Bauersfelda	1940 AD	Walther Bauersfeld (1879–1959), German engineer, designer of the Zeiss planetaria	DMP · 1553
1554 Yugoslavia	1940 RE	Socialist Federal Republic of Yugoslavia, discoverer's fatherland	DMP · 1554
1555 Dejan	1941 SA	Dejan Đurković, son of Yugoslav astronomer Petar Đurković (1908–1981)	DMP · 1555
1556 Wingolfia	1942 AA	Wingolf, a fraternity at Heidelberg University	DMP · 1556
1557 Roehla	1942 AD	Lars Ruehl, Swedish-German doctor in Heidelberg, Germany, in gratitude for restoring the discoverer's health	DMP · 1557
1558 Järnefelt	1942 BD	Gustaf J. Järnefelt, Finnish astronomer	MPC · 1558
1559 Kustaanheimo	1942 BF	Paul H. Kustaaheimo, Finnish astronomer at the Helsinki Observatory	MPC · 1559
1560 Strattonia	1942 XB	F. J. M. Stratton (1881–1960), British astronomer	DMP · 1560
1561 Fricke	1941 CG	Walter Fricke, German astronomer and director of ARI in Heidelberg	MPC · 1561
1562 Gondolatsch	1943 EE	Friedrich Gondolatsch, German astronomer at ARI	MPC · 1562
1563 Noël	1943 EG	Emanuel Arend, son of Belgian astronomer Sylvain Arend who discovered this minor planet	DMP · 1563
1564 Srbija	1936 TB	Serbia (first minor planet discovered from Belgrade)	DMP · 1564
1565 Lemaître	1948 WA	Georges Lemaître (1894–1966), Belgian astronomer and Jesuit priest	MPC · 1565
1566 Icarus	1949 MA	Icarus, mythological Greek aeronaut	MPC · 1566
1567 Alikoski	1941 HN	Heikki A. Alikoski (1912–1997), observatory assistant at Turku Observatory in Finland and a discoverer of minor planets	MPC · 1567
1568 Aisleen	1946 QB	Wife of discoverer Ernest Leonard Johnson	MPC · 1568
1569 Evita	1948 PA	Eva Perón (1919–1952), First Lady of Argentina	MPC · 1569
1570 Brunonia	1948 TX	Brown University	MPC · 1570
1571 Cesco	1950 FJ	Ronaldo P. Cesco and Carlos Ulrrico Cesco (died 1987), Argentine astronomers, latter a discoverer of minor planets	MPC · 1571
1572 Posnania	1949 SC	Poznań, Poland	MPC · 1572
1573 Väisälä	1949 UA	Yrjö Väisälä (1891–1971), Finnish astronomer	MPC · 1573
1574 Meyer	1949 FD	G. Meyer, French astronomer	MPC · 1574
1575 Winifred	1950 HH	Winifred Cameron (1918–2016), American planetary geologist	MPC · 1575
1576 Fabiola	1948 SA	Queen Fabiola of Belgium, former Queen of Belgium	MPC · 1576
1577 Reiss	1949 BA	Guy Reiss (1904–1964), French astronomer and discoverer of minor planets	MPC · 1577
1578 Kirkwood	1951 AT	Daniel Kirkwood (1814–1895), American astronomer	MPC · 1578
1579 Herrick	1948 SB	Samuel Herrick (1911–1974), American astronomer and mathematician	MPC · 1579
1580 Betulia	1950 KA	Betulia Herrick, wife of American astronomer Samuel Herrick	MPC · 1580
1581 Abanderada	1950 LA_{1}	"Abanderada", Spanish for leader carrying a banner, in honour of Eva Perón	MPC · 1581
1582 Martir	1950 LY	"Martir", Spanish for martyr, in honour of Eva Perón	MPC · 1582
1583 Antilochus	1950 SA	Antilochus, mythological Greek warrior	MPC · 1583
1584 Fuji	1927 CR	Mount Fuji, Japan	MPC · 1584
1585 Union	1947 RG	Union Observatory in Johannesburg, South Africa	MPC · 1585
1586 Thiele	1939 CJ	Thorvald N. Thiele (1838–1910), Danish astronomer	DMP · 1586
1587 Kahrstedt	1933 FS_{1}	Albrecht Kahrstedt (1897–1971), German ARI-astronomer at Heidelberg, computer of minor planet orbits, and later director of the Babelsberg Observatory, Berlin. Several asteroids including (984), (1026) and (1209) were named after members of his family.	MPC · 1587
1588 Descamisada	1951 MH	"Descamisada", Spanish for shirtless (worker), in honour of Eva Perón	MPC · 1588
1589 Fanatica	1950 RK	"Fanatica", Spanish for fanatical woman, in honour of Eva Perón	MPC · 1589
1590 Tsiolkovskaja	1933 NA	Konstantin Tsiolkovsky (1857–1935), Russian rocket scientist	MPC · 1590
1591 Baize	1951 KA	Paul Baize (1901–1995), French physician and amateur astronomer	MPC · 1591
1592 Mathieu	1951 LA	Mathieu, grandchild of Belgian astronomer Sylvain Arend who discovered this minor planet	MPC · 1592
1593 Fagnes	1951 LB	Hautes Fagnes, plateau in Belgium	MPC · 1593
1594 Danjon	1949 WA	André-Louis Danjon (1890–1967), French astronomer	MPC · 1594
1595 Tanga	1930 ME	Tanga, Tanzania	MPC · 1595
1596 Itzigsohn	1951 EV	Miguel Itzigsohn (1908–1978), Argentinian astronomer and discoverer of minor planets	MPC · 1596
1597 Laugier	1949 EB	Marguerite Laugier (1896–1976), French astronomer and discoverer of minor planets	MPC · 1597
1598 Paloque	1950 CA	Émile Paloque, French astronomer and director of the Toulouse Observatory	MPC · 1598
1599 Giomus	1950 WA	Gien-sur-Loire, France	MPC · 1599
1600 Vyssotsky	1947 UC	Emma Vyssotsky (1894–1975), American astronomer	MPC · 1600

== 1601–1700 ==
back to top

Named minor planet	Provisional	This minor planet was named for...	Ref · Catalog
1601 Patry	1942 KA	André Patry (1902–1960), French astronomer and discoverer of minor planets	MPC · 1601
1602 Indiana	1950 GF	Indiana and Indiana University	MPC · 1602
1603 Neva	1926 VH	Neva, river running through Saint Petersburg, Russia	MPC · 1603
1604 Tombaugh	1931 FH	Clyde Tombaugh (1906–1997), American astronomer and discoverer of minor planets; this asteroid was amongst the numerous asteroids recorded by Tombaugh during the search for Pluto	MPC · 1604
1605 Milankovitch	1936 GA	Milutin Milanković (1879–1958), Serbian astronomer	MPC · 1605
1606 Jekhovsky	1950 RH	Benjamin Jekhowsky (Jekhovsky; 1881–1975), Russian-born French astronomer	MPC · 1606
1607 Mavis	1950 RA	Mavis Bruwer, wife of South African astronomer Jacobus Albertus Bruwer	MPC · 1607
1608 Muñoz	1951 RZ	F. A. Muñoz, assistant astronomer at the La Plata Observatory in Argentina. He was an observer and orbit computer of minor planets, and was involved in the testing of the 2.15-meter Argentine telescope (Jorge Sahade Telescope).	MPC · 1608
1609 Brenda	1951 NL	Granddaughter of discoverer Ernest Leonard Johnson	MPC · 1609
1610 Mirnaya	1928 RT	Russian for "peaceful". Proposed by the Institute of Theoretical Astronomy in St Petersburg	DMP · 1610
1611 Beyer	1950 DJ	Max Beyer (1894–1982), German astronomer at Bergedorf Observatory	MPC · 1611
1612 Hirose	1950 BJ	Hideo Hirose (広瀬秀雄), Japanese astronomer	MPC · 1612
1613 Smiley	1950 SD	Charles Hugh Smiley (1903–1977), American astronomer	MPC · 1613
1614 Goldschmidt	1952 HA	Hermann Goldschmidt (1802–1866), German-French astronomer and discoverer of minor planets	MPC · 1614
1615 Bardwell	1950 BW	Conrad M. Bardwell (1926–2010), American astronomer and research associate with the Minor Planet Center who has made numerous difficult identifications of objects, and has produced numerous reliable ephemerides. The asteroid's name was proposed by F. K. Edmondson and Deloris J. Owings.	MPC · 1615
1616 Filipoff	1950 EA	Lionel Filipoff (1893–1940), French astronomer at Paris and Algiers Observatory	MPC · 1616
1617 Alschmitt	1952 FB	Alfred Schmitt (1907–1973), French astronomer and discoverer of minor planets	MPC · 1617
1618 Dawn	1948 NF	Dawn, granddaughter of South African astronomer Ernest Leonard Johnson who discovered this minor planet	MPC · 1618
1619 Ueta	1953 TA	Jo Ueta (上田穣), Japanese astronomer and director of Kwasan Observatory	MPC · 1619
1620 Geographos	1951 RA	National Geographic Society	MPC · 1620
1621 Druzhba	1926 TM	Russian for friendship	DMP · 1621
1622 Chacornac	1952 EA	Jean Chacornac (1823–1873), French astronomer and discoverer of minor planets	MPC · 1622
1623 Vivian	1948 PL	Vivian Hirst, daughter of South African astronomer William Parkinson Hirst	DMP · 1623
1624 Rabe	1931 TT_{1}	Eugene Rabe (1911–1974), German astronomer	MPC · 1624
1625 The NORC	1953 RB	NORC (Naval Ordnance Research Calculator)	MPC · 1625
1626 Sadeya	1927 AA	The "Spanish and American Astronomical Society", acronym: S.A.D.E.Y.A. (Sociedad Astronómica de España y America), of which Josep Comas i Solà was its first president (Src).	MPC · 1626
1627 Ivar	1929 SH	Late brother of discoverer Ejnar Hertzsprung	MPC · 1627
1628 Strobel	1923 OG	Willi Strobel, German ARI-astronomer	MPC · 1628
1629 Pecker	1952 DB	Jean-Claude Pecker (1923–2020), French astronomer	DMP · 1629
1630 Milet	1952 DA	Bernard Milet, French astronomer at Nice Observatory	MPC · 1630
1631 Kopff	1936 UC	August Kopff (1882–1960), German astronomer and discoverer of minor planets	MPC · 1631
1632 Sieböhme	1941 DF	Siegfried Böhme, German ARI-astronomer	MPC · 1632
1633 Chimay	1929 EC	Chimay, Belgium	MPC · 1633
1634 Ndola	1935 QP	Ndola, Zambia	MPC · 1634
1635 Bohrmann	1924 QW	Alfred Bohrmann (1904–2000), German astronomer and discoverer of minor planets	MPC · 1635
1636 Porter	1950 BH	Jermain Gildersleeve Porter (1852–1933), American astronomer and director of the Cincinnati Observatory, as well as for John Guy Porter (1900–1981), British astronomer at HM Nautical Almanac Office and orbit computer with the British Astronomical Association (Src).	MPC · 1636
1637 Swings	1936 QO	Pol Swings (1906–1983), Belgian astronomer	MPC · 1637
1638 Ruanda	1935 JF	Ruanda-Urundi	MPC · 1638
1639 Bower	1951 RB	Ernest Clare Bower, American mathematician and astronomer (Pluto's orbit)	MPC · 1639
1640 Nemo	1951 QA	Captain Nemo, fictional character	DMP · 1640
1641 Tana	1935 OJ	Tana River in Kenya	MPC · 1641
1642 Hill	1951 RU	George William Hill (1838–1914), American mathematician and astronomer	MPC · 1642
1643 Brown	1951 RQ	Ernest William Brown (1866–1938), British astronomer	MPC · 1643
1644 Rafita	1935 YA	Late son of discoverer	MPC · 1644
1645 Waterfield	1933 OJ	Reginald Lawson Waterfield (1900–1986) and William Francis Herschel Waterfield (1886–1933), British astronomers	MPC · 1645
1646 Rosseland	1939 BG	Svein Rosseland (1894–1985), Norwegian astrophysicist	MPC · 1646
1647 Menelaus	1957 MK	Menelaus, mythological Greek king	MPC · 1647
1648 Shajna	1935 RF	Grigory Shajn (1892–1956), Russian astronomer and discoverer of minor planets, husband of the discoverer Pelageya Shajn	MPC · 1648
1649 Fabre	1951 DE	Hervé Fabre, French astronomer at the Nice Observatory	MPC · 1649
1650 Heckmann	1937 TG	Otto Heckmann (1901–1983), German astronomer	MPC · 1650
1651 Behrens	1936 HD	Johann Gerhard Behrens (1889–1978), German astronomer, orbit computer and pastor at Detern in Lower Saxony, Germany	MPC · 1651
1652 Hergé	1953 PA	Hergé (1907–1983), Belgian cartoonist best known for creating The Adventures of Tintin	DMP · 1652
1653 Yakhontovia	1937 RA	N. S. Yakhontova, husband of Nataliya Yakhontova, Russian astronomer and long-time head of the Minor Planet Department of the Institute of Theoretical Astronomy (ITA) in St Petersburg, Russia	DMP · 1653
1654 Bojeva	1931 TL	Nina Fedorovna Bojeva (1890–1956), Russian astronomer	DMP · 1654
1655 Comas Solà	1929 WG	Josep Comas i Solà, Catalan astronomer and discoverer of minor planets	MPC · 1655
1656 Suomi	1942 EC	Native name for the country of Finland	MPC · 1656
1657 Roemera	1961 EA	Elizabeth Roemer (1929–2016), American astronomer	MPC · 1657
1658 Innes	1953 NA	Robert T. A. Innes (1861–1933), Scottish amateur-turned-professional astronomer and first director of the Transvaal (afterwards Union) Observatory	DMP · 1658
1659 Punkaharju	1940 YL	Punkaharju, Finland	MPC · 1659
1660 Wood	1953 GA	Harry Edwin Wood, South African astronomer	DMP · 1660
1661 Granule	A916 FA	Edward A. Gall, pathologist known for the lymphocyte feature Gall's granule or "Gall body"	DMP · 1661
1662 Hoffmann	A923 RB	Irmtraud Hoffmann, daughter-in-law of discoverer	MPC · 1662
1663 van den Bos	1926 PE	Willem Hendrik van den Bos (1896–1974), Dutch–South African astronomer	DMP · 1663
1664 Felix	1929 CD	Felix Timmermans (1886–1947), Belgian writer	DMP · 1664
1665 Gaby	1930 DQ	Gaby Reinmuth, daughter-in-law of discoverer	MPC · 1665
1666 van Gent	1930 OG	Hendrik van Gent (1899–1947), Dutch astronomer and discoverer of minor planets	DMP · 1666
1667 Pels	1930 SY	G. Pels, computational assistant at Leiden Observatory	DMP · 1667
1668 Hanna	1933 OK	Hanna Reinmuth, daughter-in-law of discoverer	MPC · 1668
1669 Dagmar	1934 RS	Dagmar, female given name	MPC · 1669
1670 Minnaert	1934 RZ	Marcel Minnaert (1893–1970), Belgian-born Dutch astronomer	MPC · 1670
1671 Chaika	1934 TD	Russian for seagull, in honour of Valentina Tereshkova	DMP · 1671
1672 Gezelle	1935 BD	Guido Gezelle (1830–1899), Flemish poet and a Roman Catholic priest	DMP · 1672
1673 van Houten	1937 TH	Cornelis Johannes van Houten (1920–2002), Dutch astronomer and discoverer of minor planets	MPC · 1673
1674 Groeneveld	1938 DS	Ingrid van Houten-Groeneveld (1921–2015), Dutch astronomer and discoverer of minor planets	MPC · 1674
1675 Simonida	1938 FB	A gracious Serbian Queen Simonida from the Middle Ages	DMP · 1675
1676 Kariba	1939 LC	Kariba Lake, Zambia/Zimbabwe	MPC · 1676
1677 Tycho Brahe	1940 RO	Tycho Brahe (1546–1601), Danish astronomer	DMP · 1677
1678 Hveen	1940 YH	Hven (Hveen), island in Øresund with Tycho Brahe's castle Uraniborg and observatory Stjerneborg	DMP · 1678
1679 Nevanlinna	1941 FR	Rolf Nevanlinna (1895–1980), Finnish mathematician	MPC · 1679
1680 Per Brahe	1942 CH	Per Brahe the Younger (1602–1680), governor-general of Finland	MPC · 1680
1681 Steinmetz	1948 WE	Julius Steinmetz (1893–1965), German pastor and orbit computer	MPC · 1681
1682 Karel	1949 PH	Karel, son of Dutch astronomers Ingrid and Cornelis van Houten	MPC · 1682
1683 Castafiore	1950 SL	Bianca Castafiore, cartoon character (Tintin), opera singer	DMP · 1683
1684 Iguassú	1951 QE	Iguazu Falls, on the Iguazu River, Brazil/Argentina	DMP · 1684
1685 Toro	1948 OA	Toro, maiden name of astronomer Samuel Herrick's wife	MPC · 1685
1686 De Sitter	1935 SR_{1}	Willem de Sitter (1872–1934), Dutch astronomer	MPC · 1686
1687 Glarona	1965 SC	Canton of Glarus, Switzerland	MPC · 1687
1688 Wilkens	1951 EQ_{1}	Alexander Wilkens, Argentine astronomer	MPC · 1688
1689 Floris-Jan	1930 SO	Floris-Jan van der Meulen, 5000th visitor to an astronomical exhibition	DMP · 1689
1690 Mayrhofer	1948 VB	Karl Mayrhofer, Austrian mathematician and amateur astronomer	MPC · 1690
1691 Oort	1956 RB	Jan Oort (1900–1992), Dutch astronomer	MPC · 1691
1692 Subbotina	1936 QD	Mikhail Subbotin (1893–1966), Soviet-Russian mathematician and astronomer	DMP · 1692
1693 Hertzsprung	1935 LA	Ejnar Hertzsprung (1873–1967), Danish astronomer	MPC · 1693
1694 Kaiser	1934 SB	Frederik Kaiser (1808–1872), Dutch astronomer	MPC · 1694
1695 Walbeck	1941 UO	Henrik Johan Walbeck (1794–1822), Finnish geodesist	MPC · 1695
1696 Nurmela	1939 FF	Tauno Kalervo Nurmela (1907–1985), Finnish academic and chancellor of Turku University	MPC · 1696
1697 Koskenniemi	1940 RM	Veikko Antero Koskenniemi (1885–1962), Finnish poet	MPC · 1697
1698 Christophe	1934 CS	Christophe, grand-nephew of French astronomer Georges Roland who co-discovered Comet Arend–Roland	DMP · 1698
1699 Honkasalo	1941 QD	Tauno Bruno Honkasalo (1912–1975), Finnish mathematician	MPC · 1699
1700 Zvezdara	1940 QC	Zvezdara, Belgrade, Serbia and Montenegro	MPC · 1700

== 1701–1800 ==
back to top

Named minor planet	Provisional	This minor planet was named for...	Ref · Catalog
1701 Okavango	1953 NJ	Okavango River in southwest Africa	DMP · 1701
1702 Kalahari	A924 NC	Kalahari Desert, a large semi-arid sandy savannah in Southern Africa extending 900,000 km^{2} (350,000 sq mi)	DMP · 1702
1703 Barry	1930 RB	Roger Barry (1752–1813), German astronomer at the Mannheim Observatory, which was a precursor of the Heidelberg Observatory	MPC · 1703
1704 Wachmann	A924 EE	Arno Arthur Wachmann (1902–1990), German astronomer and discoverer of minor planets	MPC · 1704
1705 Tapio	1941 SL_{1}	Tapio, Finnish mythological figure from the Kalevala	MPC · 1705
1706 Dieckvoss	1931 TS	Wilhelm Dieckvoß (1908–1982, also spelled Dieckvoss), German astronomer and a discoverer of minor planets	MPC · 1706
1707 Chantal	1932 RL	Chantal, niece of French astronomer Georges Roland	DMP · 1707
1708 Pólit	1929 XA	Isidre Pòlit (1880–1958), Spanish astronomer of Catalan origin and a discoverer of minor planets	MPC · 1708
1709 Ukraina	1925 QA	Country of Ukraine	DMP · 1709
1710 Gothard	1941 UF	Jenõ Gothard (1857–1909), Hungarian amateur astronomer	MPC · 1710
1711 Sandrine	1935 BB	Sandrine, grand-niece of French astronomer Georges Roland	DMP · 1711
1712 Angola	1935 KC	Country of Angola, Africa	MPC · 1712
1713 Bancilhon	1951 SC	Odette Bancilhon (1908–1998), French astronomer, wife of Alfred Schmitt, and a discoverer of minor planets	MPC · 1713
1714 Sy	1951 OA	Frédéric Sy, French astronomer and discoverer of minor planets	MPC · 1714
1715 Salli	1938 GK	Salli, wife of Finnish astronomer Heikki A. Alikoski who discovered this minor planet	MPC · 1715
1716 Peter	1934 GF	Peter, grandson of the discoverer Karl Wilhelm Reinmuth	DMP · 1716
1717 Arlon	1954 AC	Arlon, a Walloon town and municipality in Belgium	MPC · 1717
1718 Namibia	1942 RX	The Republic of Namibia in southern Africa, where the discoverer Marja Väisälä worked for many years, teaching the children of Finnish missionaries	JPL · 1718
1719 Jens	1950 DP	Jens, grandson of discoverer Karl Reinmuth	MPC · 1719
1720 Niels	1935 CQ	Niels, grandson of discoverer Karl Reinmuth	MPC · 1720
1721 Wells	1953 TD_{3}	Herman B. Wells, an Indiana University administrator	DMP · 1721
1722 Goffin	1938 EG	Edwin Goffin, Belgian astronomer	DMP · 1722
1723 Klemola	1936 FX	Irja Klemola (1898–1995), Finnish author, esperantist, teacher and amateur astronomer, as well as for Arnold Richard Klemola (1931–2019), American astronomer and a discoverer of minor planets	MPC · 1723
1724 Vladimir	1932 DC	Vladimir, grandson of Serbian astronomer Milorad B. Protić who re-discovered this asteroid in 1952	JPL · 1724
1725 CrAO	1930 SK	Crimean Astrophysical Observatory	DMP · 1725
1726 Hoffmeister	1933 OE	Cuno Hoffmeister (1892–1968), German astronomer and discoverer of minor planets	MPC · 1726
1727 Mette	1965 BA	Mette, wife of British astronomer A. David Andrews who discovered this Mars-crossing asteroid	JPL · 1727
1728 Goethe Link	1964 TO	Goethe Link, American surgeon, amateur astronomer and donor of the Goethe Link Observatory	MPC · 1728
1729 Beryl	1963 SL	Beryl Potter, staff member at Indiana University	MPC · 1729
1730 Marceline	1936 UA	Heroine of The Immoralist, novel by André Gide	DMP · 1730
1731 Smuts	1948 PH	Jan Smuts (1870–1950), prime minister of South Africa	MPC · 1731
1732 Heike	1943 EY	Heike Neckel, granddaughter of Alfred Bohrmann, German astronomer	MPC · 1732
1733 Silke	1938 DL_{1}	Silke Neckel, discoverer's granddaughter	MPC · 1733
1734 Zhongolovich	1928 TJ	Ivan Danilovich Zhongolovich, Russian astronomer and geodesist	MPC · 1734
1735 ITA	1948 RJ_{1}	The Institute for Theoretical Astronomy (ITA) in St Petersburg, Russia	JPL · 1735
1736 Floirac	1967 RA	Suburb of Bordeaux, France	MPC · 1736
1737 Severny	1966 TJ	Andrei Borisovich Severnyi, Russian astronomer and director of the Crimean Astrophysical Observatory	MPC · 1737
1738 Oosterhoff	1930 SP	P. Th. Oosterhoff (1904–1978), Dutch astronomer and General Secretary of the IAU in the 1950s	MPC · 1738
1739 Meyermann	1939 PF	Bruno Meyermann (1876–1963), German astronomer	DMP · 1739
1740 Paavo Nurmi	1939 UA	Paavo Nurmi (1897–1973), Finnish runner	JPL · 1740
1741 Giclas	1960 BC	Henry L. Giclas (1910–2007), American astronomer and a discoverer of minor planets	MPC · 1741
1742 Schaifers	1934 RO	Karl Schaifers (1921–), German astronomer at Heidelberg Observatory	DMP · 1742
1743 Schmidt	4109 P-L	Bernhard Schmidt (1879–1935), a Baltic German optician who invented the Schmidt camera.	DMP · 1743
1744 Harriet	6557 P-L	Wife of Paul Herget, American astronomer and director of the Cincinnati Observatory	MPC · 1744
1745 Ferguson	1941 SY_{1}	James Ferguson, American astronomer and a discoverer of minor planets	DMP · 1745
1746 Brouwer	1963 RF	Dirk Brouwer (1902–1966), Dutch-born American astronomer	MPC · 1746
1747 Wright	1947 NH	William Wright (1871–1959), a pioneering astrophysicist at Lick Observatory	MPC · 1747
1748 Mauderli	1966 RA	Sigmund Mauderli (1876–1962), Swiss astronomer and director of the Astronomical Institute of the University of Bern	MPC · 1748
1749 Telamon	1949 SB	Telamon, mythological Greek King, father of Ajax and Teucer	DMP · 1749
1750 Eckert	1950 NA_{1}	Wallace John Eckert (1902–1971), American astronomer	MPC · 1750
1751 Herget	1955 OC	Paul Herget (1908–1981), American astronomer and director of the Cincinnati Observatory	DMP · 1751
1752 van Herk	1930 OK	Gijsbert van Herk, Dutch astronomer and astrometrist at Leiden Observatory	JPL · 1752
1753 Mieke	1934 JM	Mieke Oort, wife of Dutch astronomer Jan Oort	JPL · 1753
1754 Cunningham	1935 FE	Leland Cunningham (1904–1989), American astronomer and discoverer of minor planets	MPC · 1754
1755 Lorbach	1936 VD	Anne Lorbach Herget, wife of American astronomer Paul Herget and assistant at the Cincinnati Observatory	MPC · 1755
1756 Giacobini	1937 YA	Michel Giacobini (1873–1938), French astronomer	DMP · 1756
1757 Porvoo	1939 FC	Porvoo, Finland	JPL · 1757
1758 Naantali	1942 DK	Naantali, Finland	JPL · 1758
1759 Kienle	1942 RF	Hans Kienle (1895–1975), a German astrophysicist and director of several German observatories. Known for his work on spectrophotometry, Kienle was also president of IAU Commission 36 during 1955–1958.	DMP · 1759
1760 Sandra	1950 GB	Granddaughter of South-African discoverer Ernest Leonard Johnson	MPC · 1760
1761 Edmondson	1952 FN	Frank K. Edmondson (1912–2008), American astronomer	DMP · 1761
1762 Russell	1953 TZ	Henry Norris Russell (1877–1957), American astronomer	DMP · 1762
1763 Williams	1953 TN_{2}	Ken P. Williams, British mathematician and writer	DMP · 1763
1764 Cogshall	1953 VM_{1}	Wilbur A. Cogshall, American astronomer, professor of astronomy at Indiana University and director of the Kirkwood Observatory during 1900–1944	DMP · 1764
1765 Wrubel	1957 XB	Marshal H. Wrubel, American astronomer	DMP · 1765
1766 Slipher	1962 RF	Vesto Slipher (1875–1969) and his brother Earl C. Slipher (1883–1964), American astronomers	DMP · 1766
1767 Lampland	1962 RJ	Carl Otto Lampland (1873–1951), American astronomer and a discoverer of minor planets	DMP · 1767
1768 Appenzella	1965 SA	Appenzell, a canton of Switzerland	DMP · 1768
1769 Carlostorres	1966 QP	Carlos Guillermo Torres (1910–1965), Argentine astronomer, and Carlos Torres, Chilean astronomer	MPC · 1769
1770 Schlesinger	1967 JR	Frank Schlesinger (1871–1943), American astronomer	MPC · 1770
1771 Makover	1968 BD	Samuel Gdalevich Makover, Russian astronomer at the Institute for Theoretical Astronomy (ITA)	MPC · 1771
1772 Gagarin	1968 CB	Yuri Gagarin (1934–1968), Russian cosmonaut and the first human to journey into outer space	MPC · 1772
1773 Rumpelstilz	1968 HE	Rumpelstiltskin, folk-tale character	DMP · 1773
1774 Kulikov	1968 UG_{1}	Dmitri Kuzmich Kulikov, Russian astronomer at the Institute for Theoretical Astronomy (ITA)	MPC · 1774
1775 Zimmerwald	1969 JA	The village of Zimmerwald in Switzerland	DMP · 1775
1776 Kuiper	2520 P-L	Gerard Kuiper (1905–1973), Dutch-born American astronomer	MPC · 1776
1777 Gehrels	4007 P-L	Tom Gehrels (1925–2011), Dutch-born American astronomer	MPC · 1777
1778 Alfvén	4506 P-L	Hannes Alfvén (1908–1995), Swedish astrophysicist	MPC · 1778
1779 Paraná	1950 LZ	The Paraná River in Argentina	DMP · 1779
1780 Kippes	A906 RA	Otto Kippes (1905–1994), German amateur astronomer	DMP · 1780
1781 Van Biesbroeck	A906 UB	George Van Biesbroeck (1880–1974), Belgian-born American astronomer	DMP · 1781
1782 Schneller	1931 TL_{1}	Heribert Schneller (1901–1967), German astronomer and observer of variable stars, who worked at Babelsberg Observatory in Potsdam, Berlin	DMP · 1782
1783 Albitskij	1935 FJ	Vladimir Albitsky (1891–1952), Russian astronomer and discoverer of minor planets at the Simeiz Observatory	MPC · 1783
1784 Benguella	1935 MG	The city of Benguela in western Angola, Africa	MPC · 1784
1785 Wurm	1941 CD	Karl Wurm (1899–1975), German astrophysicist and planetary scientist. He was president of IAU Commission 15 during 1958–1964.	DMP · 1785
1786 Raahe	1948 TL	Raahe, Finland	MPC · 1786
1787 Chiny	1950 SK	Chiny, a Walloon municipality of Belgium	MPC · 1787
1788 Kiess	1952 OZ	Carl Clarence Kiess (1887–1967), American astronomer	DMP · 1788
1789 Dobrovolsky	1966 QC	Georgy Dobrovolsky (1928–1971), Russian cosmonaut who died during the Soyuz 11 mission	DMP · 1789
1790 Volkov	1967 ER	Vladislav Volkov (1935–1971), Russian cosmonaut who died during the Soyuz 11 mission	DMP · 1790
1791 Patsayev	1967 RE	Viktor Patsayev (1933–1971), Russian cosmonaut who died during the Soyuz 11 mission	DMP · 1791
1792 Reni	1968 BG	The town of Reni in south Ukraine, birthplace of Alexander Deutsch (1900–1986)	DMP · 1792
1793 Zoya	1968 DW	Zoya Kosmodemyanskaya (1923–1941), Russian World War II heroine	DMP · 1793
1794 Finsen	1970 GA	William Stephen Finsen (1905–1979), South African astronomer	DMP · 1794
1795 Woltjer	4010 P-L	Jan Woltjer (1891–1946), Dutch astronomer	DMP · 1795
1796 Riga	1966 KB	Riga, Latvia	MPC · 1796
1797 Schaumasse	1936 VH	Alexandre Schaumasse (1882–1958), French astronomer and discoverer of minor planets	DMP · 1797
1798 Watts	1949 GC	Chester Burleigh Watts (1889–1971), American astronomer	DMP · 1798
1799 Koussevitzky	1950 OE	Serge Koussevitzky (1874–1951), Russian conductor	DMP · 1799
1800 Aguilar	1950 RJ	Félix Aguilar (1884–1943), Argentine engineer, astronomer and director of the La Plata Observatory. The Félix Aguilar Observatory was also named after him.	MPC · 1800

== 1801–1900 ==
back to top

Named minor planet	Provisional	This minor planet was named for...	Ref · Catalog
1801 Titicaca	1952 SP_{1}	Lake Titicaca, Peru	DMP · 1801
1802 Zhang Heng	1964 TW_{1}	Zhang Heng (AD 78–139), Ancient Chinese astronomer, mathematician, inventor, artist and scholar	MPC · 1802
1803 Zwicky	1967 CA	Fritz Zwicky (1898–1974), Swiss astronomer	DMP · 1803
1804 Chebotarev	1967 GG	Gleb Aleksandrovich Chebotarev (1913–1975), Russian astronomer	DMP · 1804
1805 Dirikis	1970 GD	Matiss Dīriķis (1923–1993), Latvian astronomer	DMP · 1805
1806 Derice	1971 LC	Derice Harwood, wife of Dennis N. Harwood, Australian astronomer at Perth Observatory	JPL · 1806
1807 Slovakia	1971 QA	Slovakia, part of the Central European state of Czechoslovakia	DMP · 1807
1808 Bellerophon	2517 P-L	Bellerophon, mythological Greek hero	MPC · 1808
1809 Prometheus	2522 P-L	Prometheus, mythological Greek Titan	MPC · 1809
1810 Epimetheus	4196 P-L	Epimetheus, mythological Greek Titan	MPC · 1810
1811 Bruwer	4576 P-L	Jacobus Albertus Bruwer, South African astronomer	MPC · 1811
1812 Gilgamesh	4645 P-L	Gilgamesh, mythological Sumerian hero	MPC · 1812
1813 Imhotep	7589 P-L	Imhotep, Egyptian architect	MPC · 1813
1814 Bach	1931 TW_{1}	Johann Sebastian Bach (1685–1750), German composer	MPC · 1814
1815 Beethoven	1932 CE_{1}	Ludwig van Beethoven (1770–1827), German composer	MPC · 1815
1816 Liberia	1936 BD	Liberia, country on the western coast of Africa	JPL · 1816
1817 Katanga	1939 MB	Province of Katanga in the Democratic Republic of the Congo	JPL · 1817
1818 Brahms	1939 PE	Johannes Brahms (1833–1897), German composer	MPC · 1818
1819 Laputa	1948 PC	Laputa, fictional island in Gulliver's Travels	MPC · 1819
1820 Lohmann	1949 PO	Werner Lohmann (1911–1983), German astronomer at Heidelberg and ARI	DMP · 1820
1821 Aconcagua	1950 MB	Aconcagua, mountain in the Andes	DMP · 1821
1822 Waterman	1950 OO	Alan Tower Waterman (1892–1967), American physicist, first director of the U.S. National Science Foundation	MPC · 1822
1823 Gliese	1951 RD	Wilhelm Gliese (1915–1993), German astronomer	DMP · 1823
1824 Haworth	1952 FM	Leland John Haworth (1904–1979), American particle physicist and NSF administrator	DMP · 1824
1825 Klare	1954 QH	Gerhard Klare (born 1932), German astronomer at Heidelberg Observatory	DMP · 1825
1826 Miller	1955 RC_{1}	John Anthony Miller, American astronomer at Indiana University and first director of the Kirkwood Observatory	DMP · 1826
1827 Atkinson	1962 RK	Robert d'Escourt Atkinson (1898–1982), British astronomer	DMP · 1827
1828 Kashirina	1966 PH	Valentin Semenovich Kashirin, Soviet physician from Simferopol, Crimea	MPC · 1828
1829 Dawson	1967 JJ	Bernhard Dawson (1890–1960), Argentinian astronomer	MPC · 1829
1830 Pogson	1968 HA	Norman Robert Pogson (1829–1891), English astronomer	DMP · 1830
1831 Nicholson	1968 HC	Seth Barnes Nicholson (1891–1963), American astronomer	DMP · 1831
1832 Mrkos	1969 PC	Antonín Mrkos (1918–1996), Czech astronomer	MPC · 1832
1833 Shmakova	1969 PN	Marina Valentinovna Shmakova (1910–1971), Soviet astronomer, orbit computer and staff member at ITA	MPC · 1833
1834 Palach	1969 QP	Jan Palach (1948–1969), Czech protester	MPC · 1834
1835 Gajdariya	1970 OE	Arkady Gaidar (1904–1941), Russian writer	MPC · 1835
1836 Komarov	1971 OT	Vladimir Komarov (1927–1967), Russian cosmonaut	MPC · 1836
1837 Osita	1971 QZ_{1}	Ursula Gibson, wife of American discoverer James B. Gibson ("Osita" is a Spanish translation of Ursula)	MPC · 1837
1838 Ursa	1971 UC	Ursula Wild and Urs Wild, wife and son of Swiss discoverer Paul Wild. It also refers to coat of arms of the city and canton of Bern, Switzerland.	DMP · 1838
1839 Ragazza	1971 UF	Italian for girl, and village of Bad Ragaz, Switzerland	DMP · 1839
1840 Hus	1971 UY	Jan Hus (1369–1415), Bohemian-Czech theologian	DMP · 1840
1841 Masaryk	1971 UO_{1}	Tomáš Garrigue Masaryk (1850–1937), Czechoslovak statesman	DMP · 1841
1842 Hynek	1972 AA	Hynek Kohoutek, father of Czech discoverer Luboš Kohoutek	DMP · 1842
1843 Jarmila	1972 AB	Jarmila Kohoutkova, mother of Czech discoverer Luboš Kohoutek	DMP · 1843
1844 Susilva	1972 UB	Susi, schoolmate of Swiss discoverer Paul Wild	DMP · 1844
1845 Helewalda	1972 UC	Helen, schoolmate of Swiss discoverer Paul Wild. from Wald AR, Switzerland	DMP · 1845
1846 Bengt	6553 P-L	Bengt Strömgren (1908–1987), Danish astronomer and astrophysicist	MPC · 1846
1847 Stobbe	A916 CA	Joachim Otto Stobbe (1900–1943), German astronomer at Bergedorf Observatory	DMP · 1847
1848 Delvaux	1933 QD	Delvaux, sister-in-law of Belgian astronomer Ginette Roland at Uccle Observatory	DMP · 1848
1849 Kresák	1942 AB	Ľubor Kresák (1927–1994), Czech astronomer	MPC · 1849
1850 Kohoutek	1942 EN	Luboš Kohoutek (1935–2023), Czech astronomer	MPC · 1850
1851 Lacroute	1950 VA	Pierre Lacroute, French astronomer and director of the Strasbourg Observatory	MPC · 1851
1852 Carpenter	1955 GA	Edwin Francis Carpenter (1898–1963), American astronomer	JPL · 1852
1853 McElroy	1957 XE	William D. McElroy (1917–1999), American biologist and biochemist	JPL · 1853
1854 Skvortsov	1968 UE_{1}	Evgenii Fedorovich Skvortsov (1882–1952), Russian astronomer	MPC · 1854
1855 Korolev	1969 TU_{1}	Sergei Korolev (1907–1966), Soviet rocket scientist	MPC · 1855
1856 Růžena	1969 TW_{1}	Růžena Petrovičová, staff member, Kleť Observatory	MPC · 1856
1857 Parchomenko	1971 QS_{1}	Praskoviya Georgievna Parchomenko (1886–1970), Ukrainian astronomer	MPC · 1857
1858 Lobachevskij	1972 QL	Nikolai Lobachevsky (1792–1856), Russian mathematician	MPC · 1858
1859 Kovalevskaya	1972 RS_{2}	Sofia Kovalevskaya (1850–1891), Russian mathematician	MPC · 1859
1860 Barbarossa	1973 SK	Frederick I, Holy Roman Emperor (Frederick Barbarossa; 1122–1190). It was also the nickname of Jakob Stauber (1880–1952) from Trogen, Switzerland, who was a teacher of Swiss discoverer Paul Wild	DMP · 1860
1861 Komenský	1970 WB	John Amos Comenius (Komenský; 1592–1670), Czech–Moravian theologian and educator	DMP · 1861
1862 Apollo	1932 HA	Apollo, Greek god	DMP · 1862
1863 Antinous	1948 EA	Antinous, Roman lover	MPC · 1863
1864 Daedalus	1971 FA	Daedalus, mythological Greek inventor	DMP · 1864
1865 Cerberus	1971 UA	Cerberus, Greek monster	DMP · 1865
1866 Sisyphus	1972 XA	Sisyphus, mythological Greek	DMP · 1866
1867 Deiphobus	1971 EA	Deiphobus, mythological Trojan	MPC · 1867
1868 Thersites	2008 P-L	Thersites, mythological Greek warrior	MPC · 1868
1869 Philoctetes	4596 P-L	Philoctetes, mythological Greek warrior	MPC · 1869
1870 Glaukos	1971 FE	Glaukos (Glaucus) from Greek mythology. In Homer's Iliad, he was captain in the Lycian army during the Trojan War and was killed by Ajax	MPC · 1870
1871 Astyanax	1971 FF	Astyanax, infant son of Hector	MPC · 1871
1872 Helenos	1971 FG	Helenus, mythological Trojan	MPC · 1872
1873 Agenor	1971 FH	Agenor, mythological Greek king	MPC · 1873
1874 Kacivelia	A924 RC	Village of Kaciveli, near Simeiz, Crimea, location of the Black Sea Hydrographical Stations, now the Marine Hydrographical Institute	MPC · 1874
1875 Neruda	1969 QQ	Jan Neruda (1834–1891), Czech writer	MPC · 1875
1876 Napolitania	1970 BA	Naples, Italy	MPC · 1876
1877 Marsden	1971 FC	Brian G. Marsden (1937–2010), astronomer and Director of the MPC	MPC · 1877
1878 Hughes	1933 QC	Son of Mireille Demiddelaer, granddaughter of Belgian discoverer Eugène Joseph Delporte	MPC · 1878
1879 Broederstroom	1935 UN	Broederstroom, South Africa	DMP · 1879
1880 McCrosky	1940 AN	Richard Eugene McCrosky, American astronomer	MPC · 1880
1881 Shao	1940 PC	Cheng-yuan Shao, assistant of Richard Eugene McCrosky, see 1880 McCrosky	MPC · 1881
1882 Rauma	1941 UJ	Rauma, Finland	JPL · 1882
1883 Rimito	1942 XA	Rymattyla, Finland	JPL · 1883
1884 Skip	1943 EB_{1}	Gunter "Skip" Schwartz, American astronomer	MPC · 1884
1885 Herero	1948 PJ	Herero, Bantu tribe	MPC · 1885
1886 Lowell	1949 MP	Percival Lowell (1855–1916), American astronomer	DMP · 1886
1887 Virton	1950 TD	Virton, Belgium	MPC · 1887
1888 Zu Chong-Zhi	1964 VO_{1}	Zu Chongzhi (AD 429–500), Chinese mathematician and astronomer	MPC · 1888
1889 Pakhmutova	1968 BE	Aleksandra Nikolaevna Pakhmutova, Soviet composer	MPC · 1889
1890 Konoshenkova	1968 CD	Olga Petrovna Konoshenkova (19191–975), schoolmistress at the Crimean Observatory School	MPC · 1890
1891 Gondola	1969 RA	The gondola	DMP · 1891
1892 Lucienne	1971 SD	Lucienne Divan, French astrophysicist	DMP · 1892
1893 Jakoba	1971 UD	Jakob Oberholzer (1862–1939), Swiss geologist and grandfather of discoverer Paul Wild	DMP · 1893
1894 Haffner	1971 UH	Hans Haffner (1912–1977), German astronomer at Bergedorf Observatory	DMP · 1894
1895 Larink	1971 UZ	Johannes Larink (1893–1988), German astronomer at Bergedorf Observatory	DMP · 1895
1896 Beer	1971 UC_{1}	Arthur Beer (1900–1980), German astronomer	MPC · 1896
1897 Hind	1971 UE_{1}	John Russell Hind (1823–1895), English astronomer	MPC · 1897
1898 Cowell	1971 UF_{1}	Philip Herbert Cowell (1870–1949), British astronomer	MPC · 1898
1899 Crommelin	1971 UR_{1}	Andrew Claude de la Cherois Crommelin (1865–1939), British astronomer	MPC · 1899
1900 Katyusha	1971 YB	Yekaterina Zelenko (1916–1941), Soviet war pilot	MPC · 1900

== 1901–2000 ==
back to top

Named minor planet	Provisional	This minor planet was named for...	Ref · Catalog
1901 Moravia	1972 AD	Moravia, a region in the east of the Czech Republic	MPC · 1901
1902 Shaposhnikov	1972 HU	Vladimir Grigorevich Shaposhnikov (1905–1942), Russian astrometrist at Simeiz Observatory	MPC · 1902
1903 Adzhimushkaj	1972 JL	Adzhimushkaj, battle site in World War II	MPC · 1903
1904 Massevitch	1972 JM	Alla Genrikhovna Massevich, Russian astronomer and astrophysicist	MPC · 1904
1905 Ambartsumian	1972 JZ	Victor Ambartsumian (1908–1996), Armenian-Russian astronomer	MPC · 1905
1906 Naef	1972 RC	Robert Adolf Naef (1907–1975), Swiss amateur astronomer after whom the Observatory Naef Épendes is also named	DMP · 1906
1907 Rudneva	1972 RC_{2}	Yevgeniya Rudneva (1920–1944), Russian World War II heroine	MPC · 1907
1908 Pobeda	1972 RL_{2}	Russian for victory	MPC · 1908
1909 Alekhin	1972 RW_{2}	Alexander Alekhine (1892–1946), Russian chess player	MPC · 1909
1910 Mikhailov	1972 TZ_{1}	Aleksandr Aleksandrovich Mikhailov (1888–1983), Russian astronomer	MPC · 1910
1911 Schubart	1973 UD	Joachim Schubart (1928–), German astronomer †	MPC · 1911
1912 Anubis	6534 P-L	Anubis, Ancient Egyptian god	JPL · 1912
1913 Sekanina	1928 SF	Zdenek Sekanina (born 1936), Czech-born American astronomer	MPC · 1913
1914 Hartbeespoortdam	1930 SB_{1}	Hartbeespoortdam, lake in South Africa	MPC · 1914
1915 Quetzálcoatl	1953 EA	Quetzalcoatl, Aztec god	MPC · 1915
1916 Boreas	1953 RA	Boreas, Greek god	MPC · 1916
1917 Cuyo	1968 AA	University of Cuyo, Argentina	MPC · 1917
1918 Aiguillon	1968 UA	Aiguillon, France	JPL · 1918
1919 Clemence	1971 SA	Gerald Maurice Clemence (1908–1974), American astronomer	MPC · 1919
1920 Sarmiento	1971 VO	Domingo Sarmiento (1811–1888), president of Argentina between 1868 and 1874, who supported American astronomer Benjamin Apthorp Gould in founding the Argentine National Observatory in Cordoba	MPC · 1920
1921 Pala	1973 SE	Pala, tribe of Native Americans	MPC · 1921
1922 Zulu	1949 HC	The Zulu people of Africa	MPC · 1922
1923 Osiris	4011 P-L	Osiris, Ancient Egyptian god	JPL · 1923
1924 Horus	4023 P-L	Horus, Ancient Egyptian god	JPL · 1924
1925 Franklin-Adams	1934 RY	John Franklin-Adams (1843–1912), British amateur astronomer	MPC · 1925
1926 Demiddelaer	1935 JA	Mireille Demiddelaer, granddaughter of Belgian discoverer Eugène Joseph Delporte	MPC · 1926
1927 Suvanto	1936 FP	Rafael Suvanto, an assistant of Finnish astronomer Yrjö Väisälä at Turku Observatory	JPL · 1927
1928 Summa	1938 SO	Village in Finland where the Battle of Summa took place during the Winter War in 1939/40	JPL · 1928
1929 Kollaa	1939 BS	Kollaa River in Russia, where the Battle of Kollaa took place during the Winter War in 1939/40	JPL · 1929
1930 Lucifer	1964 UA	Lucifer, the rebellious archangel, identified with Satan, who was expelled from heaven	MPC · 1930
1931 Čapek	1969 QB	Karel Čapek (1890–1938), Czech playwright	MPC · 1931
1932 Jansky	1971 UB_{1}	Karl Guthe Jansky (1905–1950), American astronomer	MPC · 1932
1933 Tinchen	1972 AC	Christine Kohoutek, wife of Czech discoverer Luboš Kohoutek	MPC · 1933
1934 Jeffers	1972 XB	Hamilton Jeffers (1893–1976), American astronomer	MPC · 1934
1935 Lucerna	1973 RB	The city of Lucerne, Switzerland	DMP · 1935
1936 Lugano	1973 WD	The city of Lugano, Switzerland	DMP · 1936
1937 Locarno	1973 YA	The city of Locarno, Switzerland	DMP · 1937
1938 Lausanna	1974 HC	The city of Lausanne, Switzerland	DMP · 1938
1939 Loretta	1974 UC	Loretta Kowal, daughter of American discoverer Charles T. Kowal	MPC · 1939
1940 Whipple	1975 CA	Fred Lawrence Whipple (1906–2004), American astronomer	MPC · 1940
1941 Wild	1931 TN_{1}	Paul Wild (1925–2014), Swiss astronomer	MPC · 1941
1942 Jablunka	1972 SA	Jablůnka, a village in Moravia	DMP · 1942
1943 Anteros	1973 EC	Anteros, Greek mythology	DMP · 1943
1944 Günter	1925 RA	Günter Reinmuth, son of German discoverer Karl Reinmuth	DMP · 1944
1945 Wesselink	1930 OL	Adriaan Wesselink (1909–1995), Dutch astronomer	MPC · 1945
1946 Walraven	1931 PH	Theodore Walraven, Dutch astronomer	MPC · 1946
1947 Iso-Heikkilä	1935 EA	Iso-Heikkilä, Finnish observatory	JPL · 1947
1948 Kampala	1935 GL	Kampala, Uganda	JPL · 1948
1949 Messina	1936 NE	Messina, South Africa	JPL · 1949
1950 Wempe	1942 EO	Johann Wempe (1906–1980), German astronomer	DMP · 1950
1951 Lick	1949 OA	James Lick (1796–1876), American patron of science	MPC · 1951
1952 Hesburgh	1951 JC	Theodore Hesburgh (1917–2015), American president of University of Notre Dame	JPL · 1952
1953 Rupertwildt	1951 UK	Rupert Wildt (1905–1976), German-born American astronomer	MPC · 1953
1954 Kukarkin	1952 PH	Boris Vasilyevich Kukarkin (1909–1977), Russian astronomer	JPL · 1954
1955 McMath	1963 SR	Robert Raynolds McMath (1891–1962), American astronomer	MPC · 1955
1956 Artek	1969 TX_{1}	International Children's Center "Artek" on the Crimean peninsula	DMP · 1956
1957 Angara	1970 GF	The Angara River in Siberia, Russia	DMP · 1957
1958 Chandra	1970 SB	Subrahmanyan Chandrasekhar (1910–1995), Indian astrophysicist	JPL · 1958
1959 Karbyshev	1972 NB	Dmitry Karbyshev (1880–1945), Soviet military leader	DMP · 1959
1960 Guisan	1973 UA	Henri Guisan (1874–1960), Swiss general in World War II	DMP · 1960
1961 Dufour	1973 WA	Henri Dufour (1787–1875), Swiss general	DMP · 1961
1962 Dunant	1973 WE	Henry Dunant (1828–1910), Swiss founder of the Red Cross	DMP · 1962
1963 Bezovec	1975 CB	Named after a mountain Bezovec near Piešťany in western Slovakia, in remembrance of the numerous meteor expeditions that have been organized in that area since 1958	DMP · 1963
1964 Luyten	2007 P-L	Willem Jacob Luyten (1899–1994), Dutch-born American astronomer	JPL · 1964
1965 van de Kamp	2521 P-L	Peter van de Kamp (1901–1995), Dutch-born American astronomer	JPL · 1965
1966 Tristan	2552 P-L	Tristan, Knight of the Round Table	MPC · 1966
1967 Menzel	A905 VC	Donald Howard Menzel (1901–1976), American astronomer	DMP · 1967
1968 Mehltretter	1932 BK	Johannes Peter Mehltretter (1934–1982), German astronomer	DMP · 1968
1969 Alain	1935 CG	Alain Vanheste, husband of the granddaughter of the Belgian discoverer Sylvain Arend	MPC · 1969
1970 Sumeria	1954 ER	Sumer, ancient kingdom	MPC · 1970
1971 Hagihara	1955 RD_{1}	Yusuke Hagihara (1897–1979), Japanese astronomer	MPC · 1971
1972 Yi Xing	1964 VQ_{1}	Yi Xing (683–727), Chinese astronomer	MPC · 1972
1973 Colocolo	1968 OA	Colocolo, an Araucanian chief in Chile	JPL · 1973
1974 Caupolican	1968 OE	Caupolican, Araucanian chief	JPL · 1974
1975 Pikelner	1969 PH	Solomon Pikelner (1921–1975), Russian astronomer	DMP · 1975
1976 Kaverin	1970 GC	Aleksej Aleksandrovich Kaverin (1904–1976), an instructor in astronomy at Irkutsk Pedagogical Institute, Russia	DMP · 1976
1977 Shura	1970 QY	Aleksandr Kosmodemyanskii (1925–1945), Soviet war hero	DMP · 1977
1978 Patrice	1971 LD	Patrice Harwood, daughter of Australian astronomer Dennis N. Harwood, see 1806 Derice	JPL · 1978
1979 Sakharov	2006 P-L	Andrei Sakharov (1921–1989), Russian physicist	JPL · 1979
1980 Tezcatlipoca	1950 LA	Tezcatlipoca, Aztec god	DMP · 1980
1981 Midas	1973 EA	Midas, mythological Greek king	DMP · 1981
1982 Cline	1975 VA	Edwin Lee Cline, inventor	DMP · 1982
1983 Bok	1975 LB	Bart Jan Bok (1906–1983), Dutch-born American astronomer and his wife Priscilla Fairfield Bok (1896–1975), American astronomer	DMP · 1983
1984 Fedynskij	1926 TN	Vsevolod Vladimirovich Fedynskii (1908–1978), Russian geophysicist	JPL · 1984
1985 Hopmann	1929 AE	Josef Hopmann (1890–1975), German astronomer	DMP · 1985
1986 Plaut	1935 SV_{1}	Lukas Plaut (1910–1984), Dutch astronomer	MPC · 1986
1987 Kaplan	1952 RH	Samuil Aronovich Kaplan (1921–1978), Russian astronomer at Lvov Observatory and at the Radiophysical Research Institute in Nizhny Novgorod, Russia	JPL · 1987
1988 Delores	1952 SV	Delores Owings, staff member, Indiana University	DMP · 1988
1989 Tatry	1955 FG	Vysoké Tatry, mountain range in Slovakia	JPL · 1989
1990 Pilcher	1956 EE	Frederick Pilcher (born 1939/40), American astronomer	MPC · 1990
1991 Darwin	1967 JL	Charles Darwin (1809–1882), British naturalist, and Sir George Darwin (1845–1912), British astronomer and mathematician	JPL · 1991
1992 Galvarino	1968 OD	Galvarino, Araucanian chief	JPL · 1992
1993 Guacolda	1968 OH_{1}	Guacolda, wife of Araucanian chief Lautaro	JPL · 1993
1994 Shane	1961 TE	C. Donald Shane (1895–1983), American astronomer	JPL · 1994
1995 Hajek	1971 UP_{1}	Tadeáš Hájek (1525–1600), Czech astronomer	DMP · 1995
1996 Adams	1961 UA	John Couch Adams (1819–1892), British mathematician and astronomer	DMP · 1996
1997 Leverrier	1963 RC	Urbain Le Verrier (1811–1877), French astronomer	DMP · 1997
1998 Titius	1938 DX_{1}	Johann Daniel Titius (1729–1796), German astronomer	DMP · 1998
1999 Hirayama	1973 DR	Kiyotsugu Hirayama (1874–1943), Japanese astronomer	DMP · 1999
2000 Herschel	1960 OA	William Herschel (1738–1822), German-born British astronomer and composer	DMP · 2000

back to top

Preceded by 1–1,000	Meanings of minor-planet names List of minor planets: 1,001–2,000	Succeeded by 2,001–3,000
