= 1887 Virton =

Stony main-belt asteroid

Discovery
- Discovered by: S. Arend
- Discovery site: Uccle Obs.
- Discovery date: 5 October 1950

Designations
- Named after: Virton (Belgian town)
- Alternative designations: 1950 TD · 1934 RG; 1944 OE · 1950 RG; 1950 TQ_{1} · 1952 BF_{1} 1960 QC · 1970 OA
- Minor planet category: main-belt · Eos

Orbital characteristics
- Epoch 4 September 2017 (JD 2458000.5)
- Uncertainty parameter 0
- Observation arc: 66.44 yr (24,266 days)
- Aphelion: 3.3481 AU
- Perihelion: 2.6606 AU
- Semi-major axis: 3.0043 AU
- Eccentricity: 0.1144
- Orbital period (sidereal): 5.21 yr (1,902 days)
- Mean anomaly: 295.94°
- Mean motion: 0° 11^{m} 21.48^{s} / day
- Inclination: 9.6221°
- Longitude of ascending node: 348.58°
- Argument of perihelion: 32.733°

Physical characteristics
- Dimensions: 20.848±0.260; 21.40 km (calculated); 22.174±0.605 km 23.43±0.54 km
- Geometric albedo: 0.105±0.005; 0.1085±0.0158; 0.124±0.015; 0.14 (assumed)
- Spectral type: S
- Absolute magnitude (H): 11.1 · 11.3

1887 Virton, provisional designation 1950 TD, is a stony Eoan asteroid from the outer region of the asteroid belt, approximately 21 kilometers in diameter. It was discovered by Belgian astronomer Sylvain Arend at the Royal Observatory of Belgium in Uccle on 5 October 1950, and named after the Belgian town of Virton.

== Orbit and classification ==
Virton is a member of the Eos family. It orbits the Sun in the outer main-belt at a distance of 2.7–3.3 AU once every 5 years and 3 months (1,902 days). Its orbit has an eccentricity of 0.11 and an inclination of 10° with respect to the ecliptic.

The asteroid's observation arc begins with its official discovery observation at Uccle, as previous observations at Johannesburg, Crimea-Simeis and Turku Observatory remained unused.

== Physical characteristics ==
The asteroid has been characterized as a common stony S-type asteroid.

=== Diameter and albedo ===
According to the surveys carried out by the Japanese Akari satellite and NASA's Wide-field Infrared Survey Explorer with its subsequent NEOWISE mission, Virton measures between 20.8 and 23.43 kilometers in diameter and its surface has an albedo between 0.105 and 0.124, respectively. The Collaborative Asteroid Lightcurve Link assumes an albedo of 0.14 and calculates a diameter of 21.4 kilometers with an absolute magnitude of 11.1.

=== Lightcurves ===
As of 2017, Virton's rotation period and shape remain unknown.

== Naming ==
This minor planet was named after the town and capital district, Virton, in the southernmost part Belgium. It is located very close to Robelmont, Arend's birthplace (also see 1145 Robelmonte). The official naming citation was published by the Minor Planet Center on 22 September 1983 (M.P.C. 8151).
