= 1505 Koranna =

Asteroid

Discovery
- Discovered by: C. Jackson
- Discovery site: Johannesburg Obs.
- Discovery date: 21 April 1939

Designations
- Named after: Koranna people (native South African people)
- Alternative designations: 1935 MD · 1939 HH; 1948 MB · 1958 UM
- Minor planet category: main-belt · (middle); Eunomia · background

Orbital characteristics
- Epoch 4 September 2017 (JD 2458000.5)
- Uncertainty parameter 0
- Observation arc: 82.26 yr (30,045 days)
- Aphelion: 3.0150 AU
- Perihelion: 2.3037 AU
- Semi-major axis: 2.6593 AU
- Eccentricity: 0.1337
- Orbital period (sidereal): 4.34 yr (1,584 days)
- Mean anomaly: 15.932°
- Mean motion: 0° 13^{m} 38.28^{s} / day
- Inclination: 14.471°
- Longitude of ascending node: 248.28°
- Argument of perihelion: 342.44°

Physical characteristics
- Dimensions: 20.46±0.76 km 20.88±2.1 km 21.00 km (derived); 22.277±0.690 km 22.83±0.88 km
- Synodic rotation period: 4.45±0.15 h (Note: Garceran (2013) web: rotation period 4.45±0.15 hours with a brightness amplitude of 0.70 mag. Summary figures for (1505) Koranna at LCDB); 4.451±0.001 h 4.452±0.0011 h
- Geometric albedo: 0.082±0.007; 0.0929±0.022; 0.107±0.016; 0.1209 (derived); 0.127±0.021
- Spectral type: S (assumed)
- Absolute magnitude (H): 11.197±0.002 (R) · 11.30 · 11.47±0.63 · 11.60

1505 Koranna (provisional designation 1939 HH) is a stony Eunomia asteroid from the central regions of the asteroid belt, approximately 21 kilometers in diameter. It was discovered on 21 April 1939, by South African astronomer Cyril Jackson at the Union Observatory in Johannesburg. The asteroid was named for the native Koranna people of South Africa.

== Orbit and classification ==
Koranna is a non-family asteroid of the main belt's background population when applying the hierarchical clustering method to its proper orbital elements. The asteroid has also been classified as a member of the Eunomia family (502), a prominent family of stony S-type asteroid and the largest one in the intermediate main belt with more than 5,000 members.

It orbits the Sun in the central main belt at a distance of 2.3–3.0 AU once every 4 years and 4 months (1,584 days). Its orbit has an eccentricity of 0.13 and an inclination of 14° with respect to the ecliptic. The asteroid was first identified in June 1935 as 1935 MD at Simeiz Observatory on Crimea, where the body's observation arc begins the following month in July 1935.

== Physical characteristics ==
Koranna is an assumed stony S-type asteroid.

=== Rotation period ===
Between 2088 and 2013, three rotational lightcurves of Koranna have been obtained from photometric observations. Lightcurve analysis gave a rotation period of 4.45, 4.451 and 4.452 hours with a brightness variation of 0.70, 0.55 and 0.53, respectively magnitude (U=2+/3/2). A high brightness amplitude typically indicates that the body has an elongated, non-spherical shape.

=== Diameter and albedo ===
According to the surveys carried out by the Infrared Astronomical Satellite IRAS, the Japanese Akari satellite and the NEOWISE mission of NASA's Wide-field Infrared Survey Explorer, Koranna measures between 20.46 and 22.83 kilometers in diameter and its surface has an albedo between 0.082 and 0.127. The Collaborative Asteroid Lightcurve Link derives an albedo of 0.1209 and a diameter of 21.00 kilometers based on an absolute magnitude of 11.3.

== Naming ==
This minor planet was named after the native Koranna people, better known as the Griqua people of South Africa. The tribe of wandering San people (Bushman) lives in the southern part of the Kalahari Desert in southern Africa. The official naming citation was published by the Minor Planet Center in April 1953 (M.P.C. 909).
