= 1097 Vicia =

Main-belt asteroid

Discovery
- Discovered by: K. Reinmuth
- Discovery site: Heidelberg Obs.
- Discovery date: 11 August 1928

Designations
- Pronunciation: /ˈvɪsiə, -ʃiə/
- Named after: Vicia (flowering plant)
- Alternative designations: 1928 PC · 1941 SO_{2} 1958 PF · 1978 BG; A907 VF
- Minor planet category: main-belt · (middle)

Orbital characteristics
- Epoch 4 September 2017 (JD 2458000.5)
- Uncertainty parameter 0
- Observation arc: 109.40 yr (39,958 days)
- Aphelion: 3.4186 AU
- Perihelion: 1.8697 AU
- Semi-major axis: 2.6441 AU
- Eccentricity: 0.2929
- Orbital period (sidereal): 4.30 yr (1,570 days)
- Mean anomaly: 274.05°
- Mean motion: 0° 13^{m} 45.12^{s} / day
- Inclination: 1.5332°
- Longitude of ascending node: 133.86°
- Argument of perihelion: 176.51°

Physical characteristics
- Dimensions: 19.63±6.08 km 21.02 km (derived); 23.110±0.118 km 23.95±1.04 km 24.93±0.54 km 26.55±0.35 km
- Synodic rotation period: 26.5±0.1 h
- Geometric albedo: 0.031±0.004; 0.04±0.00; 0.044±0.007; 0.05±0.02; 0.060±0.003; 0.0695 (derived)
- Spectral type: S/C
- Absolute magnitude (H): 11.70 · 11.90 · 12.0 · 12.14±0.26 · 12.20

1097 Vicia, provisional designation 1928 PC, is an asteroid from the central regions of the asteroid belt, approximately 23 kilometers in diameter. Discovered by Karl Reinmuth at the Heidelberg Observatory in 1928, the asteroid was later named after the flowering plant Vicia, commonly known as vetches.

== Discovery ==
Vicia was discovered by German astronomer Karl Reinmuth at the Heidelberg-Königstuhl State Observatory in southwest Germany on 11 August 1928. On 15 and 22 August, the asteroid was independently discovered by Soviet astronomer Pelageya Shajn at Simeiz Observatory on the Crimean peninsula, and by English astronomer Harry Edwin Wood at the Johannesburg Observatory in South Africa, respectively. However, the Minor Planet Center only recognizes the first discoverer.

The asteroid was first identified as A907 VF at Heidelberg in May 1907. The body's observation arc begins at Heidelberg in August 1928, six nights after its official discovery observation.

== Orbit and classification ==
Vicia is a non-family asteroid from the main belt's background population. It orbits the Sun in the central main belt at a distance of 1.9–3.4 AU once every 4 years and 4 months (1,570 days). Its orbit has an eccentricity of 0.29 and an inclination of 2° with respect to the ecliptic.

== Physical characteristics ==
Vicia spectral type has not been determined. Asteroids in the central main belt with a semi-major axis between 2.6 and 2.7 AU, are located in a transitional region where both stony and carbonaceous asteroids are frequent and generic assumptions are difficult. (Note: For central-belt asteroids with 2.6 < a < 2.7, the LCDB assumes an "S/C" class with an albedo of 0.10, a compromise between the stony (p=0.20) and carbonaceous (p=0.057) asteroids)

=== Rotation period ===
In November 2010, a rotational lightcurve of Vicia was obtained from photometric observations by Gordon Gartrelle at the University of North Dakota (730) and at the Badlands Observatory in North Dakota, United States. Analysis of the fragmentary lightcurve gave a rotation period of 26.5 hours with a brightness variation of 0.08 magnitude, indicative for a spherical rather than irregular and elongated shape (U=1). As of 2017, however, no other lightcurve has been obtained and Vicia's rotation period has not yet been secured.

=== Diameter and albedo ===
According to the surveys carried out by the Japanese Akari satellite and the NEOWISE mission of NASA's Wide-field Infrared Survey Explorer, Vicia measures between 19.63 and 26.55 kilometers in diameter and its surface has an albedo between 0.031 and 0.060.

The Collaborative Asteroid Lightcurve Link derives an albedo of 0.0695 and a diameter of 21.02 kilometers based on an absolute magnitude of 11.9.

== Naming ==
This minor planet was named after the flowering plant Vicia, member of the Fabaceae (legume family). It is commonly known as vetches. The official naming citation was mentioned in The Names of the Minor Planets by Paul Herget in 1955 (H 103).

=== Reinmuth's flowers ===
Due to his many discoveries, Karl Reinmuth submitted a large list of 66 newly named asteroids in the early 1930s. The list covered his discoveries with numbers between (1009) and (1200). This list also contained a sequence of 28 asteroids, starting with 1054 Forsytia, that were all named after plants, in particular flowering plants (also see list of minor planets named after animals and plants).
