= 1127 Mimi =

Main-belt asteroid

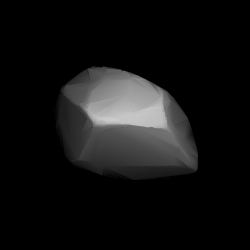
- Modelled shape of Mimi from its lightcurve

Discovery
- Discovered by: S. Arend
- Discovery site: Uccle Obs.
- Discovery date: 13 January 1929

Designations
- Named after: "Mimi" Delporte (wife of Eugène Delporte)
- Alternative designations: 1929 AJ · 1948 PU; A906 OA
- Minor planet category: main-belt · (middle); background

Orbital characteristics
- Epoch 4 September 2017 (JD 2458000.5)
- Uncertainty parameter 0
- Observation arc: 87.10 yr (31,812 days)
- Aphelion: 3.2821 AU
- Perihelion: 1.9104 AU
- Semi-major axis: 2.5962 AU
- Eccentricity: 0.2642
- Orbital period (sidereal): 4.18 yr (1,528 days)
- Mean anomaly: 122.26°
- Mean motion: 0° 14^{m} 8.16^{s} / day
- Inclination: 14.745°
- Longitude of ascending node: 128.63°
- Argument of perihelion: 281.95°

Physical characteristics
- Mean diameter: 46.006±0.305 km 46.18±10.10 km 46.84±4.9 km 48.198±0.465 km 49.53±0.67 km 50.67±13.81 km
- Synodic rotation period: 8.5410±0.0004 h 8.541±0.1 h 12.749±0.003 h
- Pole ecliptic latitude: (224.0°, −57.0°) (λ_{1}/β_{1})
- Geometric albedo: 0.031±0.001; 0.0317±0.0133; 0.0336±0.008; 0.034±0.005; 0.04±0.02
- Spectral type: Tholen = CX; P; B–V = 0.700; U–B = 0.300
- Absolute magnitude (H): 10.6

1127 Mimi (prov. designation: 1929 AJ) is a dark background asteroid from the central regions of the asteroid belt. It was discovered on 13 January 1929, by Belgian astronomer Sylvain Arend at the Royal Observatory of Belgium in Uccle. The carbonaceous C-type asteroids (CX) has a rotation period of 12.7 hours and measures approximately 47 kilometers (29 miles) in diameter. Through a glitch in the naming process, the asteroid received the name "Mimi" instead of "Robelmonte" as originally intended by the discoverer.

== Orbit and classification ==
Mimi is a non-family asteroid of the main belt's background population when applying the hierarchical clustering method to its proper orbital elements. It orbits the Sun in the central asteroid belt at a distance of 1.9–3.3 AU once every 4 years and 2 months (1,528 days). Its orbit has an eccentricity of 0.26 and an inclination of 15° with respect to the ecliptic. The asteroid was first observed as A906 OA at Heidelberg Observatory in July 1906. The body's observation arc begins at Uccle in May 1934, more than 5 years after its official discovery observation.

== Naming ==
This minor planet was named after "Mimi" the wife of Belgian astronomer Eugène Delporte. Through an error, the names intended for 1127 Mimi (wife of Delporte) and 1145 Robelmonte (birthplace of Arend) had been switched, and each name had been proposed by the discoverer of the other asteroid. The naming was mentioned in The Names of the Minor Planets by Paul Herget in 1955 (H 105).

== Physical characteristics ==
Mimi has been characterized as a dark P-type asteroid by the Wide-field Infrared Survey Explorer (WISE). In the Tholen classification, no unambiguous type could by assigned. Numerical color analysis showed that it is closest to the C-type asteroids and somewhat similar to the X-type asteroids (CX).

=== Rotation period and pole ===
In January 2004, the best-rated rotational lightcurve of Mimi was obtained from photometric observations by astronomer John Menke at his Menke Observatory in Barnesville, Maryland (no obs. code). Lightcurve analysis gave a well-defined rotation period of 12.749 hours with a brightness amplitude of 0.72 magnitude (U=3). Two other lightcurves gave a shorter period of 8.541 hours with an amplitude of 0.93 and 0.95 magnitude, respectively (U=2/2).

A 2016-published lightcurve, using modeled photometric data from the Lowell Photometric Database (LPD), gave a concurring period of 12.74557 hours, as well as a spin axis of (224.0°, −57.0°) in ecliptic coordinates (λ, β).

=== Diameter and albedo ===
According to the surveys carried out by the Infrared Astronomical Satellite IRAS, the Japanese Akari satellite and the NEOWISE mission of NASA's WISE telescope, Mimi measures between 46.006 and 50.67 kilometers in diameter and its surface has an albedo between 0.031 and 0.04.

The Collaborative Asteroid Lightcurve Link adopts the results obtained by IRAS, that is, an albedo of 0.0336 and a diameter of 46.84 kilometers based on an absolute magnitude of 10.95.
