= Nicolaus Vernulaeus =

Professor and playwright (1583–1649)

- Nicolas de Vernulz
- Born: 10 April 1583; Robelmont, Duchy of Luxembourg
- Died: 6 January 1649 (aged 65); Leuven, Duchy of Brabant
- Education: University of Cologne
- Occupation: professor
- Writing career
- Language: Latin
- Period: Baroque
- Genre: Neo-Latin drama

Nicolaus Vernulaeus (1583–1649) was a professor at the University of Leuven and an important Neo-Latin playwright.

== Life ==
Nicolas de Vernulz (later Latinized Nicolaus Vernulaeus) was born at Robelmont, near Virton in the Duchy of Luxembourg, on 10 April 1583. He studied at the University of Cologne, matriculating in 1601 and graduating Master of Arts. In 1610 he succeeded Jean-Baptiste Gramaye as public professor of eloquence at the University of Leuven.

In 1618 he took the degree of Licentiate of Sacred Theology in Leuven, and in 1619 became the first president of the newly opened Luxembourg College at the university. In 1646 he succeeded Erycius Puteanus as Professor of Latin at the Collegium Trilingue and was named councillor and imperial historiographer to Ferdinand III.

He died in Leuven on 6 January 1649.

== Works ==
=== Plays ===
- Gorcomienses sive fidei exilium, tragoedia (Cologne, 1610)
- Divus Eustachius sive fidei & patientiae triumphus, tragoedia (Leuven, 1612)
- Divus Stanislaus tragoedia sacra (Leuven, 1618)
- Theodoricus, tragoedia (Leuven, 1623)
- Henricus Octavus seu schisma Anglicanum, tragoedia (Leuven, 1624)
- Ottocarus Bohemiae rex, tragoedia (Leuven, 1626)
- Conradinus et Crispus, tragoediae (Leuven, 1628)
- Joanna Darcia, vulgo puella Aureliensis, tragoedia (Leuven, 1629)
- Maximus, tragoedia (Leuven, 1630)
- Tragoediae decem nunc primum simul editae (Leuven, 1631)
- Fritlandus, tragoedia (Leuven, 1636; reprinted 1637, 1646)

=== Orations and panegyrics ===
- De conceptione & visitatione Mariae, orationes duae (Leuven, 1614)
- Rhetorum collegii Porcensis orationes (Leuven, 1614; much reprinted and augmented to 1721)
- De triumpho Assumptae Virginis Deiparae panegyricus (Leuven, 1620)
- Oratio funebris in obitum Alberti archiducis Austriae (Leuven, 1621; reprinted 1622)
- Oratio de laudibus Divi Francisci (Cologne, 1622)
- Panegyricus aeternae memoriae et famae Joannis Duns Scoti (Cologne, 1622; reprinted Nancy 1625; Lyons, 1625; Mons, 1644; Leuven & Brussels, 1856)
- Laus posthuma Buquoii (Leuven, 1622; Cologne, 1623)
- Certamen oratorium de militari gloria (Leuven, 1622; Cologne, 1623, 1645)
- Orationum sacrarum volumen in festa deiparae virginis & aliquorum divorum (Leuven, 1630; reprinted 1635; Cologne, 1632)
- Laudatio funebris aeternae memoriae Isabellae Clarae Eugeniae (Leuven, 1634)
- Elogia oratoria (Leuven 1634; Cologne, 1635)
- Dissertatio oratoria de causa belli Germanici (Leuven, 1635; Cologne, 1641)
- Oratoria ad studiosam juventutem (Leuven, 1635)
- Dissertatio oratoria de causis occupatae a Francis Lotharingiae (Leuven, 1636)
- Panegyricus gratulatorius Ferdinando III (Leuven, 1637)
- Laudatio funebris augustissimi imperatoris Ferdinandi II (Leuven, 1637)
- Dissertatio oratoria de justitia armorum Batavicorum (Leuven, 1637; Cologne, 1638)
- Laudatio funebris principi Ferdinando (Leuven, Jacobus Zegers, 1641)
- Collegii pastoralis Iberniae Lovanii lectio catechistica extemporanea (Leuven, 1644)
- Oratio in funere Erycii Puteani (Leuven, 1646)

=== Scholarly writings ===
- Quis inter orbis monarchas potentissimus, dissertatio politica (Leuven, 1613)
- De arte dicendi libri tres (Leuven, 1615; reprinted at least 10 times in Leuven, Jena and Nuremberg)
- Institutionum politicarum libri IV (Leuven, 1623; reprinted 1635, 1647; Cologne, 1628)
- Institutionum moralium libri IV (Leuven, 1625; reprinted 1640, 1649)
- Institutionum oeconomicarum libri II (Leuven, 1626; reprinted 1640, 1649)
- Academia Lovaniensis libri III (Leuven, 1627)
- Annus Austriacus seu ephemeris historica (Leuven, 1628)
- Dissertatio de libertate politica (Leuven, 1628)
- Dissertationum politicarum decas prima (Leuven, 1629; reprinted 1646)
- Dissertatio politica de bello feliciter gerendo (Leuven, 1630)
- De propagatione fidei christianae in Belgio per sanctos ex Hibernia viros (Leuven, 1639; reprinted 1654)
- Virtutum augustissimae gentis Austriacae libri tres (Leuven, 1640)
- Discursus historico politici tres (Cologne, 1643)
- Dissertationum politicarum decas secunda (Leuven, 1646)
