= Robelmont =

Robelmont Roubiémont (Gaumais)
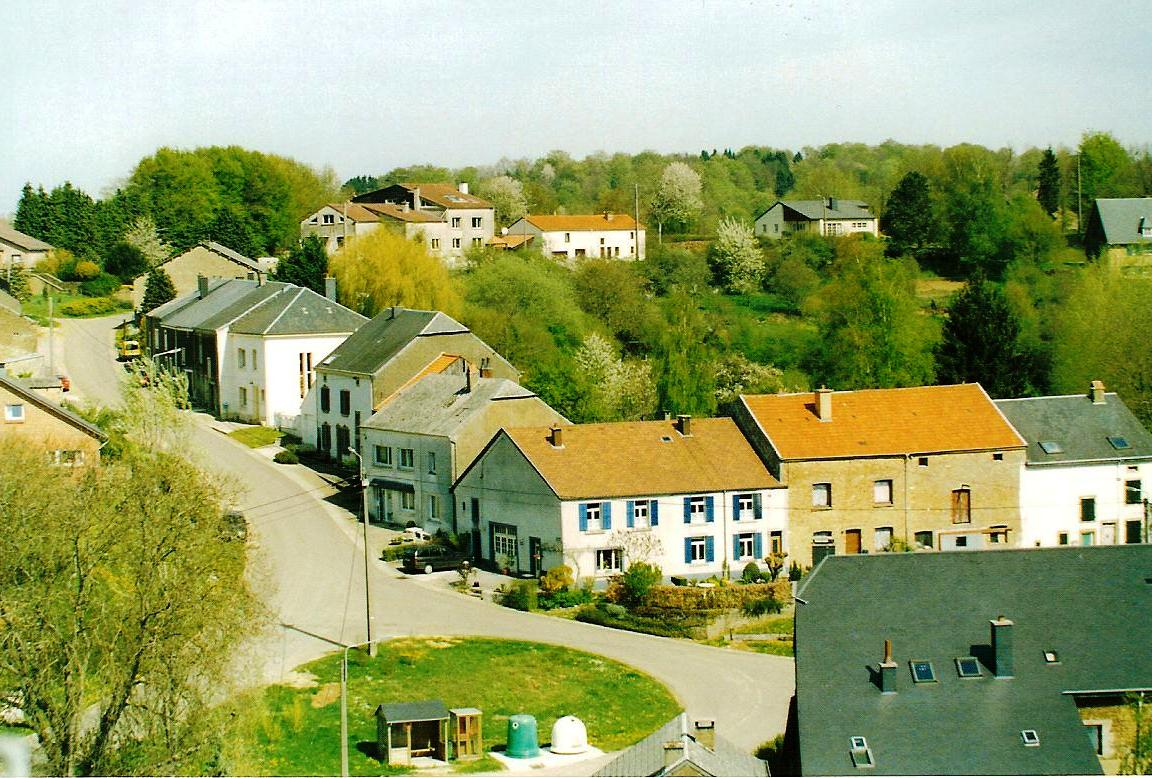
- Village of Robelmont

- Location in Belgium
- Coordinates: 49°35′N 05°30′E
- Country: Belgium
- Region: Wallonia
- Province: Luxembourg
- Municipality: Meix-devant-Virton

Population
  - Total: 480 residents in 2004
- Postal codes: 6769
- Area codes: 063

Robelmont (French pronunciation: [ʁɔbɛlmɔ̃]; Gaumais: Roubiémont) is a village of Wallonia and a district of the municipality of Meix-devant-Virton, located in the province of Luxembourg, Belgium.

The asteroid 1145 Robelmonte is named after the village, in honour of the astronomer Sylvain Arend (1902–1992), who was born there.

== History ==
A Gallo-Roman villa was excavated between 1968 and 1971.

The current parish church, dedicated to St Martin, was built in 1894.

During the Battle of the Ardennes (21-23 August 1914), there was fighting in and around Robelmont between French and German forces.

== Notable people ==
- Nicolaus Vernulaeus (1583–1649)
- Sylvain Arend (1902–1992)

== Village committee ==
The annual activities in the village are led by the village's party planning committee.
