= 1145 Robelmonte =

Main-belt asteroid

Discovery
- Discovered by: E. Delporte
- Discovery site: Uccle Obs.
- Discovery date: 3 February 1929

Designations
- Named after: Robelmont (birthplace of Sylvain Arend)
- Alternative designations: 1929 CC · A915 RN
- Minor planet category: main-belt · Vestian

Orbital characteristics
- Epoch 4 September 2017 (JD 2458000.5)
- Uncertainty parameter 0
- Observation arc: 86.87 yr (31,730 days)
- Aphelion: 2.7112 AU
- Perihelion: 2.1363 AU
- Semi-major axis: 2.4238 AU
- Eccentricity: 0.1186
- Orbital period (sidereal): 3.77 yr (1,378 days)
- Mean anomaly: 68.012°
- Mean motion: 0° 15^{m} 40.32^{s} / day
- Inclination: 6.2071°
- Longitude of ascending node: 346.82°
- Argument of perihelion: 267.51°

Physical characteristics
- Dimensions: 18.85±5.08 km 19.13±5.00 km 22.23±0.39 km 23.16 km (derived); 24.029±0.129 km 24.07±0.37 km 24.757±0.541 km
- Synodic rotation period: 7.582±0.0027 h 8.002±0.002 h 9.01±0.01 h 21 h
- Geometric albedo: 0.0994 (derived); 0.1046±0.0175; 0.108±0.020; 0.113±0.004; 0.128±0.006; 0.15±0.09; 0.16±0.08
- Spectral type: S
- Absolute magnitude (H): 11.10 · 11.157±0.001 (R) · 11.30 · 11.37±0.27 · 11.4 · 11.44

1145 Robelmonte, provisional designation 1929 CC, is a Vestian asteroid from the inner regions of the asteroid belt, approximately 23 kilometers in diameter.

It was discovered on 3 February 1929, by Belgian astronomer Eugène Delporte at the Royal Observatory of Belgium in Uccle. Through a glitch in the naming process, the asteroid received the name "Robelmonte" instead of "Mimi" as originally intended by the discoverer.

== Orbit and classification ==
Robelmonte is a member of the Vesta family (401), the main-belt's second-largest asteroid family by number of members. Vestian asteroids have a composition akin to the HED meteorites and are thought to have originated deep within 4 Vesta's crust, possibly from Rheasilvia, a large impact crater on its southern hemisphere near the South pole, formed as a result of a subcatastrophic collision. Vesta is the main belt's second-largest and second-most-massive body after Ceres.

Robelmonte orbits the Sun in the inner main-belt at a distance of 2.1–2.7 AU once every 3 years and 9 months (1,378 days). Its orbit has an eccentricity of 0.12 and an inclination of 6° with respect to the ecliptic. The asteroid was first identified as A915 RN at Simeiz Observatory in September 1915. Its observation arc begins at Algiers Observatory in August 1930, more than a year after its official discovery observation at Uccle.

== Physical characteristics ==
Robelmonte is an assumed stony S-type asteroid, despite its relatively low albedo.

=== Rotation period ===
In March 2016, the best-rated rotational lightcurve of Robelmonte was obtained from photometric observations by the Spanish amateur astronomer group OBAS (Observadores de Asteroides – Asteroid Observers). Lightcurve analysis gave a rotation period of 8.002 hours with a brightness variation of 0.13 magnitude (U=3-). Previous observations gave a divergent period of 7.582, 9.01 and 21 hours, respectively (U=2/2/1).

=== Diameter and albedo ===
According to the surveys carried out by the Japanese Akari satellite and the NEOWISE mission of NASA's Wide-field Infrared Survey Explorer, Robelmonte measures between 18.85 and 24.757 kilometers in diameter and its surface has an albedo between 0.1046 and 0.16.

The Collaborative Asteroid Lightcurve Link derives a low albedo of 0.0994 and a diameter of 23.16 kilometers based on an absolute magnitude of 11.3.

== Naming ==
This minor planet was named after Robelmont, the birthplace of Belgian astronomer Sylvain Arend (Robelmonte is the feminine form). Through an error, the names intended for 1127 Mimi (wife of Delporte) and 1145 Robelmonte (birthplace of Arend) had been switched, and each name had been proposed by the discoverer of the other asteroid. The official naming citation was mentioned in The Names of the Minor Planets by Paul Herget in 1955 (H 107).
