= 1633 Chimay =

Themistian asteroid

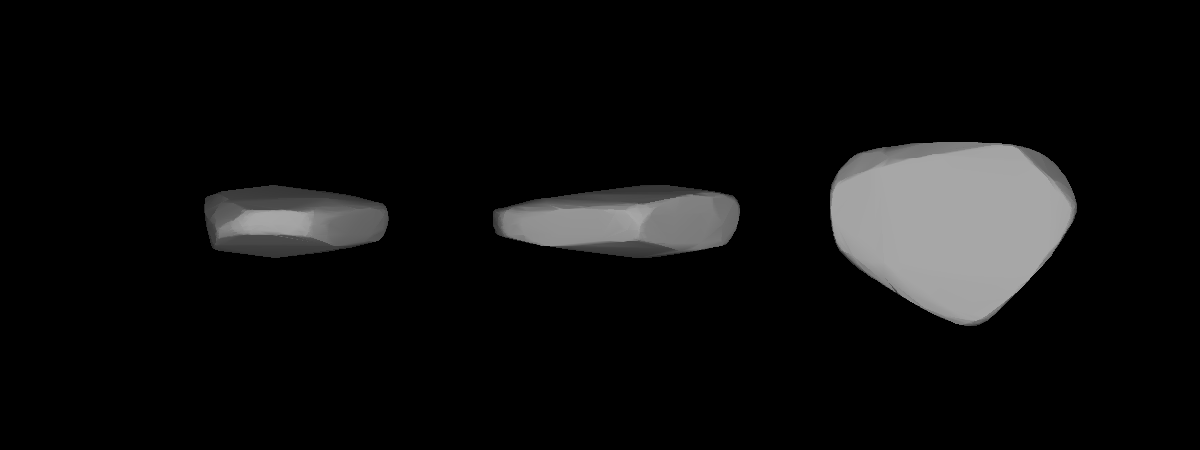
- Lightcurve based 3D-model of Chimay

Discovery
- Discovered by: S. Arend
- Discovery site: Uccle Obs.
- Discovery date: 3 March 1929

Designations
- Named after: Chimay (Belgian town)
- Alternative designations: 1929 EC · 1941 KF; 1946 HC · 1948 RO; 1951 AM · 1952 HY_{3} 1954 SS · 1955 XN; 1972 VM_{1} · A917 BB
- Minor planet category: main-belt · Themis

Orbital characteristics
- Epoch 4 September 2017 (JD 2458000.5)
- Uncertainty parameter 0
- Observation arc: 100.02 yr (36,531 days)
- Aphelion: 3.5907 AU
- Perihelion: 2.7980 AU
- Semi-major axis: 3.1943 AU
- Eccentricity: 0.1241
- Orbital period (sidereal): 5.71 yr (2,085 days)
- Mean anomaly: 237.33°
- Mean motion: 0° 10^{m} 21.36^{s} / day
- Inclination: 2.6759°
- Longitude of ascending node: 114.08°
- Argument of perihelion: 65.539°

Physical characteristics
- Dimensions: 36.07 km (derived); 36.12±3.1 km (IRAS:3); 36.26±0.86 km 37.428±0.466; 37.732±0.426 km
- Synodic rotation period: 6.58±0.01 h 6.59064±0.00005 h 6.5911±0.0001 h 6.6367±0.0038 h
- Geometric albedo: 0.0781 (derived); 0.0785±0.0135; 0.080±0.014; 0.0854±0.017 (IRAS:3); 0.088±0.005
- Spectral type: S
- Absolute magnitude (H): 10.36±0.17 (R) · 10.481±0.002 (R) · 10.5 · 10.6 · 10.97±0.06

1633 Chimay, provisional designation 1929 EC, is a Themistian asteroid from the outer region of the asteroid belt, approximately 37 kilometers in diameter.

It was discovered on 3 March 1929, by Belgian astronomer Sylvain Arend at the Royal Observatory of Belgium in Uccle. Five nights later, the body was independently discovered by Max Wolf at Heidelberg Observatory in southern Germany. It was later named for the Belgian town of Chimay.

== Classification and orbit ==
Chimay is a member of the Themis family, a dynamical family of asteroids with nearly coplanar ecliptical orbits. It orbits the Sun in the outer main-belt at a distance of 2.8–3.6 AU once every 5 years and 9 months (2,085 days). Its orbit has an eccentricity of 0.12 and an inclination of 3° with respect to the ecliptic. Chimay was first identified as A917 BB at Heidelberg in 1917, extending the body's observation arc by 12 years prior to its official discovery observation.

== Physical characteristics ==
Several rotational lightcurves were obtained from photometric observations. Lightcurve analysis gave a well-defined, concurring rotation period of 6.58–6.63 hours with a brightness variation between 0.31 and 0.58 magnitude (U=3/3-/2).

According to the surveys carried out by the Infrared Astronomical Satellite IRAS, the Japanese Akari satellite, and the NEOWISE mission of NASA's Wide-field Infrared Survey Explorer, Chimay measures between 36.1 and 37.7 kilometers in diameter, and its surface has a low albedo between 0.079 and 0.089. In accordance with the space-based surveys, the Collaborative Asteroid Lightcurve Link (CALL) derives an albedo of 0.078, and calculates a diameter of 36.1 kilometers. CALL also classifies Chimay as a S-type rather than a carbonaceous C-type asteroid.

== Naming ==
This minor planet was named after the Belgian town Chimay, home of the discoverer, who also co-discovered Comet Arend–Roland. The official naming citation was published by the Minor Planet Center on 20 February 1976 (M.P.C. 3931).
