= CC Eridani =

Binary star in the constellation Eridanus

Observation data Epoch J2000.0 Equinox ICRS
- Constellation: Eridanus
- Right ascension: 02^{h} 34^{m} 22.566^{s}
- Declination: −43° 47′ 46.869″
- Apparent magnitude (V): 8.70 to 9.05

Characteristics
- Spectral type: K7.5Ve + M3.5Ve
- B−V color index: 1.390±0.020
- Variable type: BY Dra + UV Cet

Astrometry
Radial velocity (R_{v})	41.9±0.9 km/s
Proper motion (μ)	RA: 57.516 mas/yr Dec.: −293.474 mas/yr
Parallax (π)	86.6124±0.0355 mas
Distance	37.66 ± 0.02 ly (11.546 ± 0.005 pc)
Absolute magnitude (M_{V})	8.57

Orbit
Period (P)	1.56145 d
Eccentricity (e)	0.0461
Inclination (i)	40°–50°°
Argument of periastron (ω) (secondary)	63.83°
Semi-amplitude (K_{1}) (primary)	41.94 km/s

Details

Primary
Mass	0.57 M_{☉}
Radius	0.645 R_{☉}

Secondary
Mass	0.306 M_{☉}
Radius	0.41 R_{☉}

Other designations
- CC Eri, BD−44° 775, GC 3097, GJ 103, HD 16157, HIP 11964, SAO 215947, PPM 306855, LTT 1261

Database references
SIMBAD	data

CC Eridani is a binary star system in the constellation of Eridanus. It varies in brightness from an apparent visual magnitude of 8.70 to 9.05 with a period of 1.56145 days. Based on parallax measurements, this system is located at distance of 37.7 light years from the Sun. It is drifting further away with a line of sight velocity component of 42 km/s, having come to within 20.9 light-years roughly 316,200 years ago.

== Observations ==
This star became of interest because of its relatively high parallax, leading to a study of its radial velocity. In 1959, measurements by British astronomer D. S. Evans suggested it is a spectroscopic binary with a short period of 1.56146 days. It was found to vary in brightness and so was given the variable star designation CC Eri. The stellar classification of K7 Ve presented as a K-type main-sequence star with emission lines. Its light curve was found to vary strangely over time. By 1971, these variations were hypothesized to be due to large star spots on its surface.

In 1972, it was shown to be a flare star. It was theorized that all flare stars display spots, so the large feature on CC Eri modeled as spanning 5–20% of the surface and having a temperature 1,500 K cooler than the surrounding photosphere. This class of stars became known as BY Draconis variables. CC Eri was found to show periodic variation in its Hydrogen-alpha emission, which was close to the anti-phase of its brightness variation.

Observations with the ROSAT satellite showed that CC Eri varies in X-ray emission on time scales of minutes to a few hours. Radio observations were used to detect emission during flare events, while spectropolarimetry showed the presence of a strong magnetic field at the surface. Two X-ray super flare events were observed in 2017.

This is a spectroscopic binary star system with an orbital period of 1.56145 d. The primary component is co-rotating with the orbit, making it one of the most rapidly rotating K-type dwarfs in the Sun's neighborhood. It is a very active object, typically showing a one magnitude flare every 12 hours. CC Eri is a strong X-ray source. The primary has 57% of the Sun's mass and 65% of the radius of the Sun. The fainter secondary is a red dwarf with an estimated class of M3.5Ve. It has 31% of the mass and 41% of the radius of the Sun.
