= Radcliffe Telescope =

African telescope

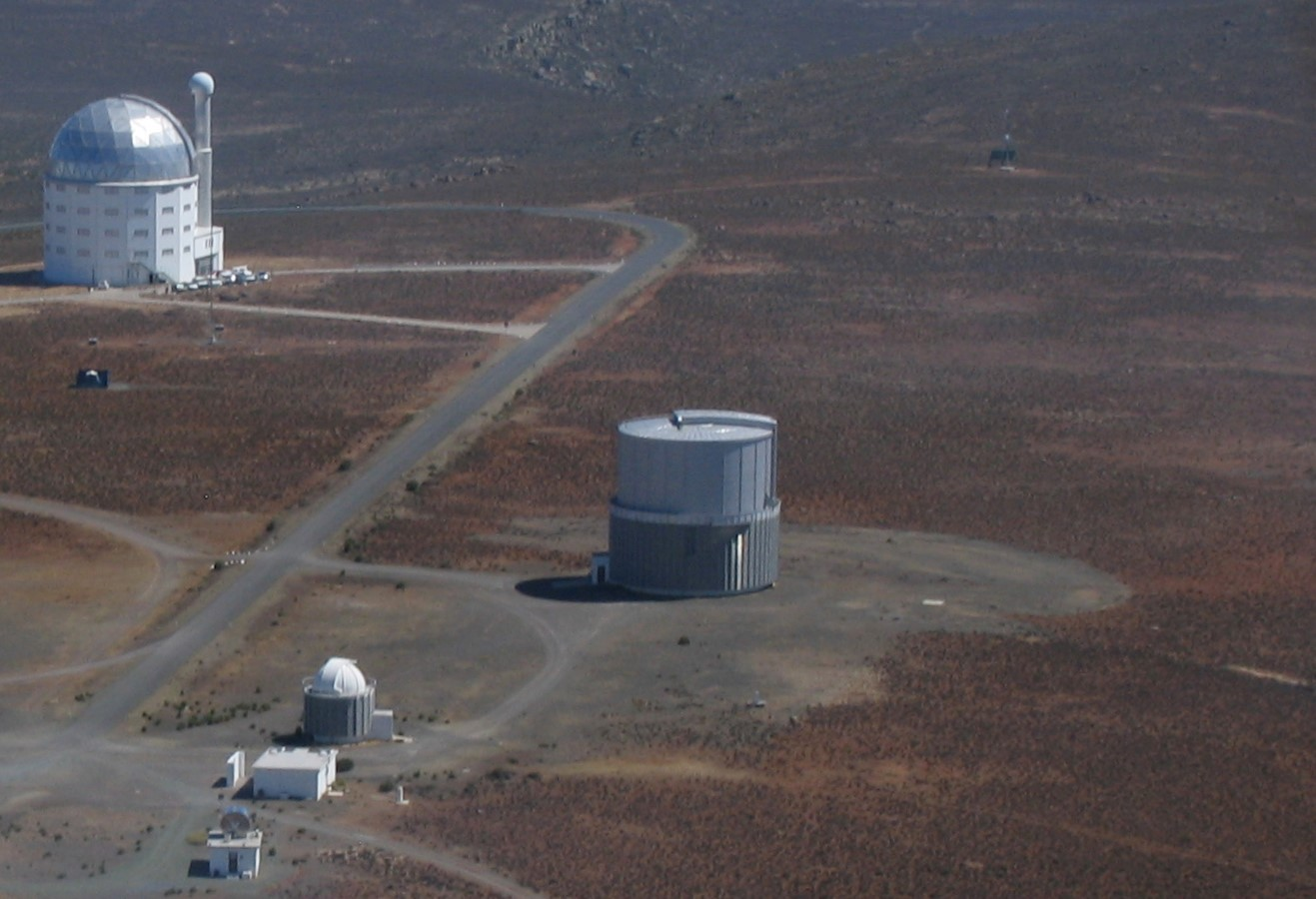
- Aerial view of the Radcliffe Telescope building at Sutherland, pictured in 2010. The Southern African Large Telescope is in the background.
- Location: Sutherland, Northern Cape, South Africa
- Coordinates: 32°22′44″S 20°48′42″E
- Organization: South African Astronomical Observatory
- Wavelength: Optical/near-infrared
- Built: 1938-1948
- First light: 1948
- Telescope style: Ritchey-Chrétien Cassegrain, Coude or Newtonian reflector
- Diameter: 74 in (1.9 m)
- Mounting: Cross-axis equatorial
- Enclosure: Turret
- Website: SAAO Homepage

The Radcliffe Telescope is a 74 in (1.9 m) optical/near-infrared reflecting telescope located at the South African Astronomical Observatory in Sutherland, Northern Cape, South Africa.

When construction was completed in 1948, the Radcliffe was the largest telescope in the Southern Hemisphere, and the joint-fourth largest in the world. (Note: The largest telescope in the world was the 200 in (5.1 m) Hale Telescope, which was completed in the same year (1948). The Radcliffe shared fourth place with its near-twin the 74 in (1.9 m) at David Dunlap Observatory. The two other telescopes in the top five were the 100 in (2.5 m) Hooker Telescope and the 82 in (2.1 m) Otto Struve Telescope.) It is currently the second largest in Africa. (Note: In 2005 the neighbouring Southern African Large Telescope (9.2m) overtook the Radcliffe to become the largest in Africa.)

The telescope is equipped with a range of instruments operating for photometry, spectroscopy and polarimetry. These are used by professional astronomers to conduct a wide range of astronomical research.

== History ==
=== Origins ===
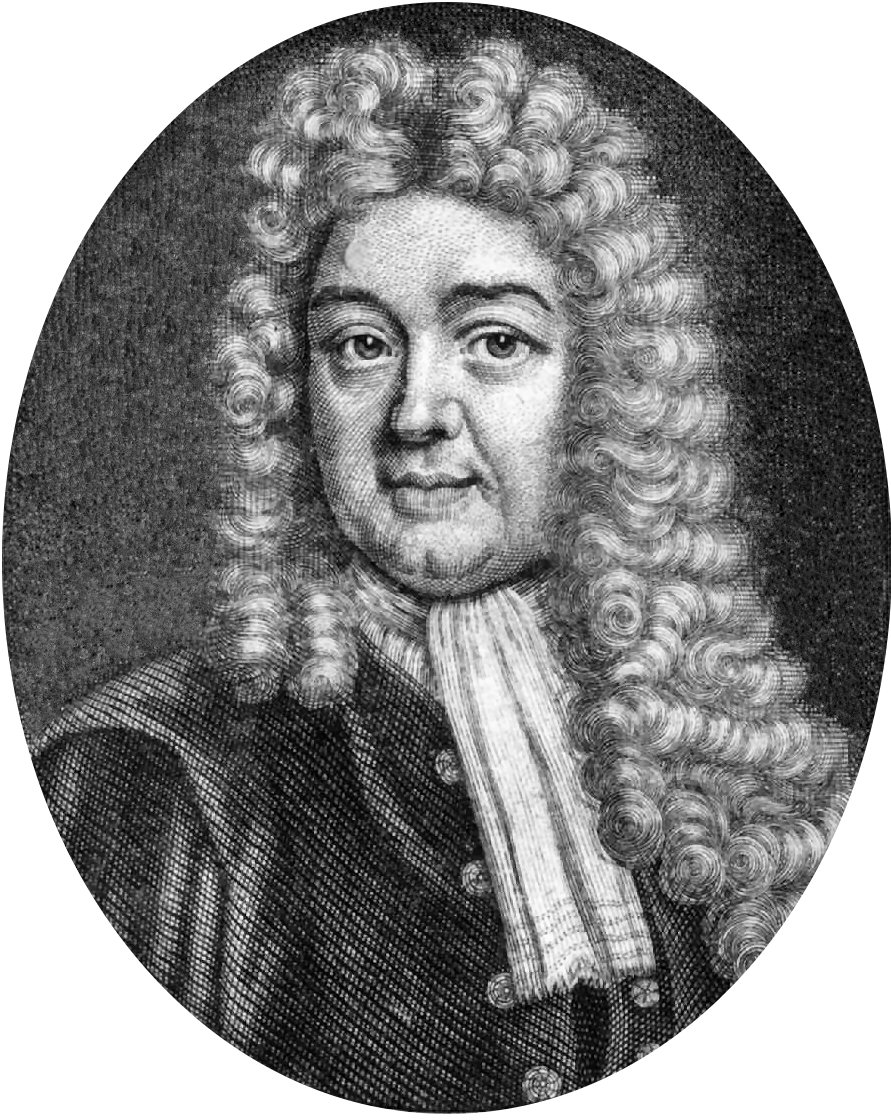
John Radcliffe, whose charitable trust funded the Radcliffe Observatory

John Radcliffe (1650–1714) was an English physician and Member of Parliament; his alma mater was the University of Oxford. He never married and had no heirs, so when he died he bequeathed much of his large fortune to a charitable trust. This Radcliffe Trust funded public projects in and around Oxford, including the Radcliffe Camera and the Radcliffe Infirmary. On the advice of Thomas Hornsby, in 1773 the trust established the Radcliffe Observatory in what was then the northern outskirts of Oxford; it was the second permanent observatory to be established in Britain (after Greenwich Observatory). This observatory carried out astronomical research, initially under the leadership of the University of Oxford's Savilian Professor of Astronomy. In 1839 the Radcliffe Trust began directly funding a Radcliffe Observer to run the observatory, and observing in Oxford continued productively for most of the next century.

In 1924 Harold Knox-Shaw became Radcliffe Observer. By this time the observatory was struggling to remain at the forefront of astronomical research, for a number of reasons. The largest telescope in Oxford was a 24 in (61 cm) refractor, but this was no longer a state-of-the-art instrument and had long been eclipsed by large new reflecting telescopes. In particular, astronomers in America now had access to much larger instruments—such as the 60 in (1.5 m) Hale Telescope (completed 1908) and the 100 in (2.5 m) Hooker Telescope (1917).

Several factors made Oxford no longer a suitable site for a research observatory. The city had expanded considerably since the eighteenth century; there was now substantial light pollution and the hot air rising from chimneys caused poor seeing. The British weather was also an impediment, with many nights lost to cloud. The neighbouring Radcliffe Infirmary was keen to expand its buildings, and there was no room for the large enclosure that would be required for any new telescope.

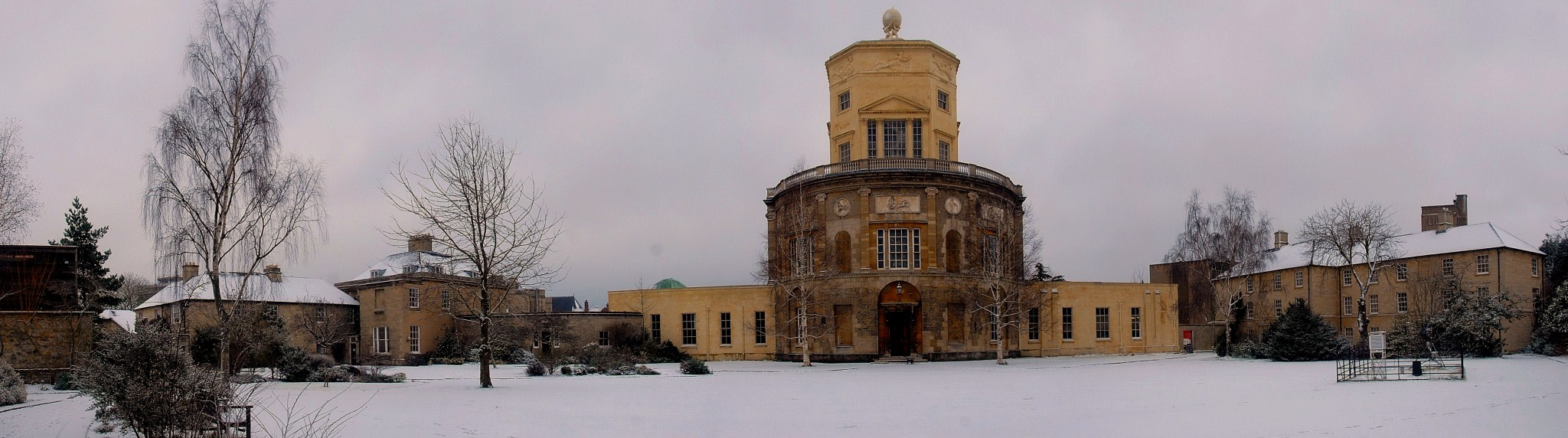
The Radcliffe Observatory, Oxford

=== Planning ===
In addition to undertaking routine observations, Knox-Shaw began planning for a new telescope and observatory. Before becoming Radcliffe Observer, Knox-Shaw had served at the Helwan Observatory in Egypt, where he came to appreciate the benefits of siting a telescope in an arid area.

In 1928 funding for the 200 in (5.1 m) Hale Telescope was approved, which was to be built at Palomar Observatory, California. This telescope would have four times the collecting area of the next largest in the world, and would easily outperform anything that the Radcliffe Observatory could construct. The southern sky is not visible from Palomar, so it was decided to site the new Radcliffe telescope in the Southern hemisphere where it could observe sources that the Hale Telescope could not.

Although the case for building a new large telescope in the Southern hemisphere was compelling, initially no funds were available to Knox-Shaw. In 1929, the millionaire philanthropist Sir William Morris, owner of Morris Motor Company and a patron of the Radcliffe Infirmary, offered to buy the grounds and buildings of the Observatory so the Infirmary could expand into them. Morris offered the sum of £100,000 (equivalent to £5.5 million in 2025), which would be sufficient to fund the new Southern hemisphere observatory.

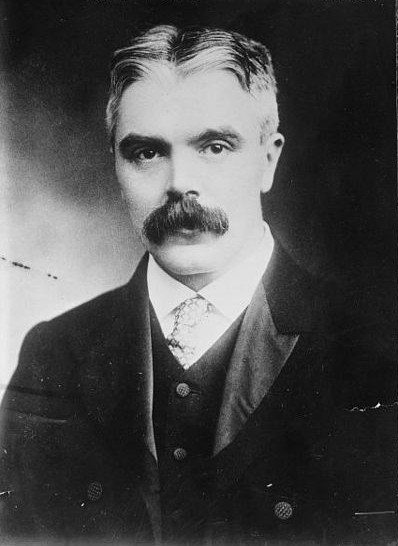
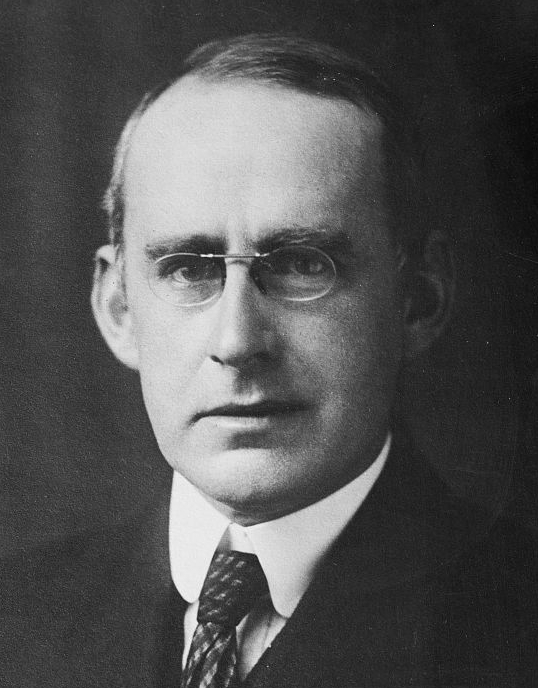
Sir Frank Dyson (left) and Sir Arthur Eddington (right), who helped decide the location of the new observatory

With the offer of funding in place, in 1929 the Radcliffe Trust asked the Astronomer Royal, Sir Frank Dyson, to assess Knox-Shaw's proposal. Dyson was in favour, and convinced the trustees of the merits of the plan. Later that year, Knox-Shaw, Dyson and Sir Arthur Eddington attended a meeting of the British Association in the Union of South Africa (then a dominion of the British Empire). They took this opportunity to examine several possible sites in the country for the new observatory, deciding that the most favourable was one located on a range of hills near the city of Pretoria. The local Municipality of Pretoria was strongly supportive, offering to donate the land and connect it to the water and electricity distribution systems for free. The site occupied an area of 57 acres (23 ha) on the Kiapperkop ridge of hills 4.5 miles (7.2 km) south-east of the city. From February to June 1930, detailed testing of the weather and seeing conditions at the site was carried out by William Herbert Steavenson, on Knox-Shaw's instructions and with logistical support from the municipality; the site was adjudged to be suitable.

=== Design and construction ===
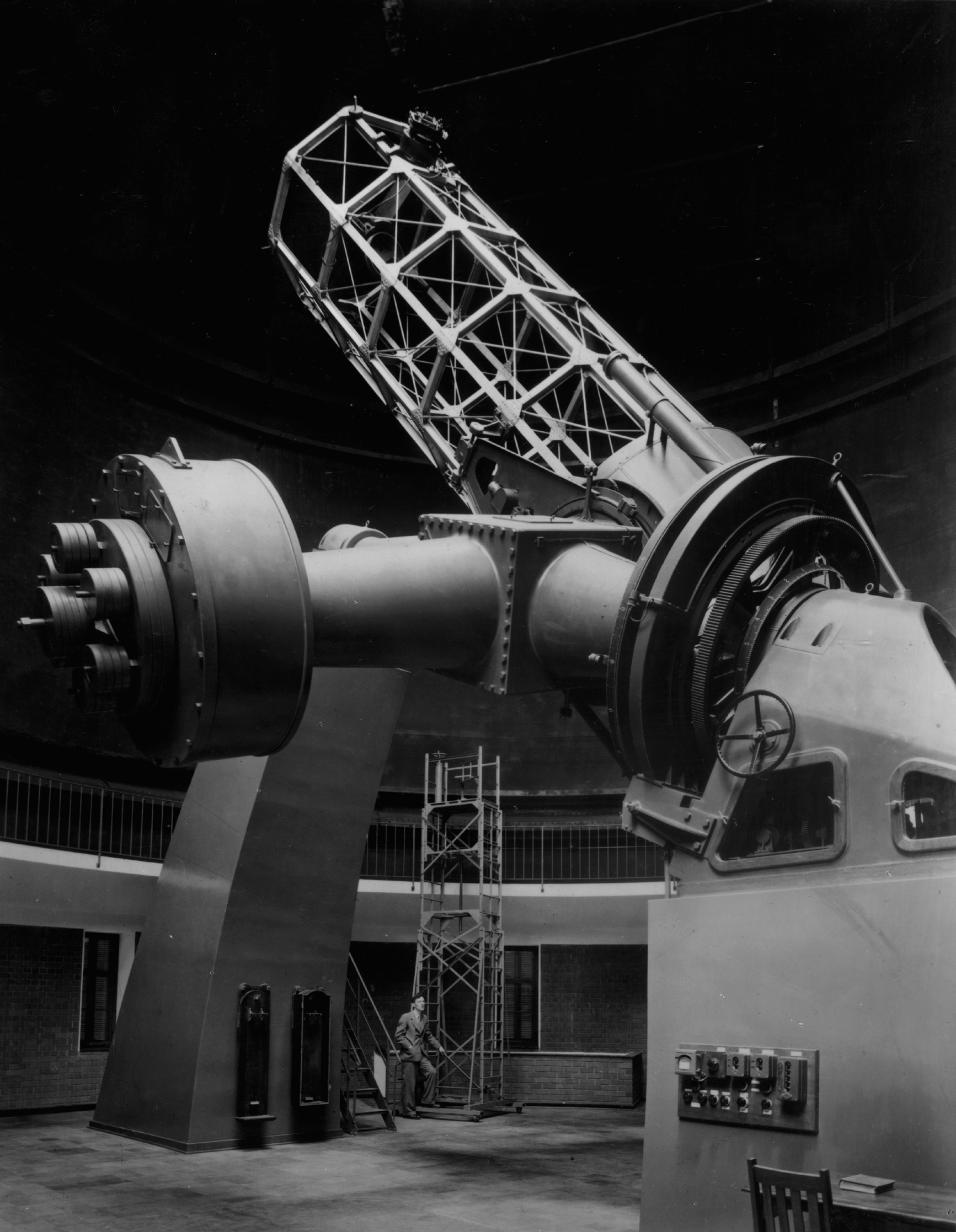
The Radcliffe Telescope in Pretoria, shortly after its construction.

Knox-Shaw approached the company Grubb Parsons to design and construct the telescope. Grubb Parsons proposed building a copy of the 74 in (1.9 m) telescope they had produced for David Dunlap Observatory in Canada, which was then under construction (it would be completed in 1935). They argued that reusing the design would save time, avoid duplication of effort, and reduce costs. It would still allow the Radcliffe Telescope to be the largest telescope in the Southern hemisphere, so this proposal was accepted. The contract for Grubb Parsons to construct the telescope was signed in 1935.

Two major changes to the design were nevertheless required. Firstly, the concrete pier on which the telescope sits had to be modified to account for the different latitude of the site. Secondly, a completely different telescope dome was selected, composed of a cylindrical turret with a diameter of 61 feet (19 m) (the Dunlap telescope had a hemispherical dome).

Despite the intention of a reused design being quicker to build, several delays arose in construction. The major parts of the telescope were shipped to South Africa in 1938, where they began to be erected in Pretoria. The main outstanding item was the polishing and installation of the primary mirror, which was still at the Grubb Parsons factory in Newcastle-upon-Tyne. A small temporary mirror was installed in Pretoria, to allow the rest of the assembly to be tested. The outbreak of the Second World War in 1939 forced all work on the mirror to be halted. Grubb Parsons was required to shift its work to military purposes (they were already the main manufacturer of British submarine periscopes), and the industrial areas of Newcastle were now a target for strategic bombing. To protect the mirror from potential bomb damage, it was buried near the factory for several years. Work on the mirror did not resume until after the war ended in 1945. It was finally installed in Pretoria and first light was achieved in 1948, over a decade after construction began.

=== Radcliffe Observatory, Pretoria ===
Harold Knox-Shaw retired as Radcliffe Observer in 1950, and was succeeded by A. David Thackeray, who had joined the observatory in 1948 as Chief Assistant to Knox-Shaw. Thackeray had previously worked at the Solar Physics Laboratory, Cambridge and the Mount Wilson Observatory, California, and had collaborated closely with Arthur Eddington. At the time of Thackeray's appointment, there was only one other astronomer on the staff of the Radcliffe Observatory, the Second Assistant David Stanley Evans. Michael Feast was appointed as the new Chief Assistant in 1951, at which point Evans left and was replaced by Adriaan Jan Wesselink.

In its early years of operation, the telescope suffered from a lack of scientific instrumentation. For over a year the only observations possible were direct photography, and spectroscopy did not become available until 1951. The first spectrograph was a dual-prism medium-resolution instrument which was mounted at the Cassegrain focus, which quickly became the main instrument for observing. In 1959 it became possible to aluminise the primary mirror, which had previously been coated with silver. The switch to aluminium enabled observations to be taken at near-ultraviolet wavelengths. Around 1960 the telescope was equipped with a high-resolution spectrograph housed in the Coudé room, and in 1970 another spectrograph was acquired: an image tube spectrograph optimised for low-resolution observations of faint objects.

The main cause of these problems was a lack of funding, which had also limited staff numbers and the amount of observing which could be undertaken. These problems were alleviated in 1951, when the Radcliffe Observatory entered into an agreement with the British Admiralty, who owned the Royal Observatory at the Cape of Good Hope in Cape Town. The Admiralty bought a one third share of the observing time on the Radcliffe Telescope, for the use of astronomers from the Royal Observatory. Some technical staff were also transferred to Pretoria from the Royal Greenwich Observatory, to provide support for visiting astronomers. In 1967, the UK Science Research Council took over the Admiralty's astronomical responsibilities and paid to increase the UK share of the observing time to 50%, which was made available to all UK-funded observers (not just those based in Cape Town).

After he retired, Knox-Shaw had continued to live in South Africa, but died in 1970 at the age of 85. His ashes were scattered on the observatory grounds. In recognition of his leading role in the construction of the telescope, a bronze memorial plaque was installed on the north pier of the telescope. It reads:

IN MEMORIUM
HAROLD KNOX-SHAW
1885-1970
RADCLIFFE OBSERVER, 1924-1950. THROUGH WHOSE LABOURS
THE RADCLIFFE OBSERVATORY AND THIS TELESCOPE
WERE SET UP UNDER THE SOUTHERN SKIES
TO THE LASTING BENEFIT OF ASTRONOMY.

HE HAS LOVED THE STARS TOO TRULY
TO BE FEARFUL OF THE NIGHT
