= 1263 Varsavia =

Asteroid

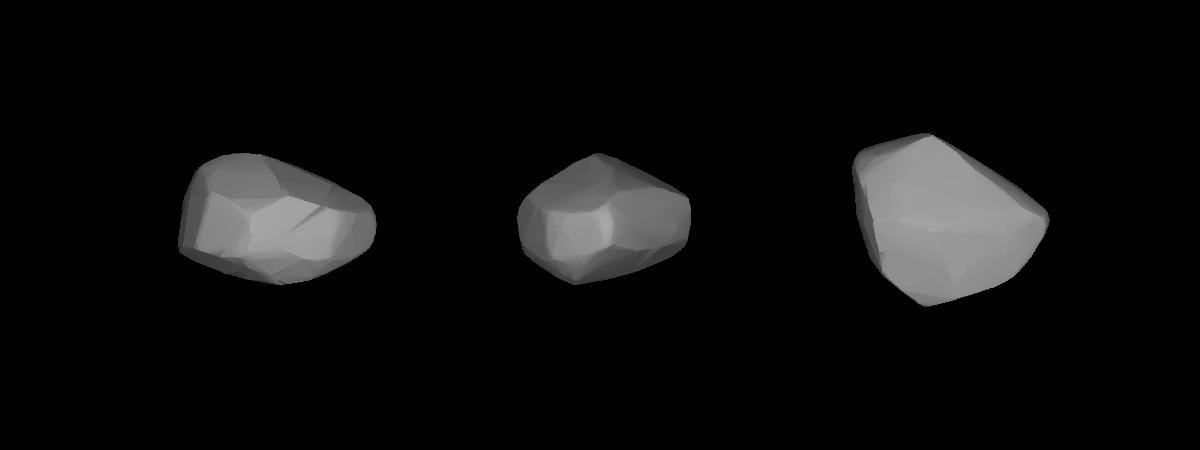
- Lightcurve-based 3D-model of Varsavia

Discovery
- Discovered by: S. Arend
- Discovery site: Uccle Obs.
- Discovery date: 23 March 1933

Designations
- Pronunciation: /vɑːrˈseɪviə/
- Named after: Warsaw (Polish capital)
- Alternative designations: 1933 FF · 1948 PB_{1}
- Minor planet category: main-belt · (middle)

Orbital characteristics
- Epoch 4 September 2017 (JD 2458000.5)
- Uncertainty parameter 0
- Observation arc: 84.28 yr (30,784 days)
- Aphelion: 3.1673 AU
- Perihelion: 2.1617 AU
- Semi-major axis: 2.6645 AU
- Eccentricity: 0.1887
- Orbital period (sidereal): 4.35 yr (1,589 days)
- Mean anomaly: 213.73°
- Mean motion: 0° 13^{m} 35.76^{s} / day
- Inclination: 29.273°
- Longitude of ascending node: 158.48°
- Argument of perihelion: 287.46°

Physical characteristics
- Dimensions: 41±8 km
- Synodic rotation period: 7.163±0.012 h 7.1639±0.0003 h (Note: Lightcurve plot of 1263 Varsavia, Palmer Divide Observatory, B. D. Warner (2003)); 7.16495±0.00005 h 7.1659±0.0013 h 7.1680±0.0006 h (Note: Oey (2011) web: rotation period 7.1680±0.0006 hours with a brightness amplitude of 0.15 mag. Summary figures at Collaborative Asteroid Lightcurve Link (CALL) for (1263) Varsavia and Julian Oey at Leura Observatory); 7.231±0.002 h 16.5±0.2 h (wrong)
- Pole ecliptic longitude: 341°
- Pole ecliptic latitude: −14°
- Geometric albedo: 0.042±0.002; 0.0459±0.002 (IRAS:11); 0.0571; 0.077±0.106; 0.08±0.02; 0.0874 (derived); 0.10±0.01
- Spectral type: X (Tholen), Xc (SMASS); X · B–V = 0.727; U–B = 0.321
- Absolute magnitude (H): 10.09±0.12 · 10.2 · 10.224±0.001 (R) · 10.38 · 10.42 · 10.5 · 10.51±0.34

1263 Varsavia, provisional designation 1933 FF, is an asteroid from the central region of the asteroid belt, approximately 40 kilometers in diameter. It was discovered on 23 March 1933, by Belgian astronomer Sylvain Arend at Uccle Observatory in Belgium. It is named for the city of Warsaw.

== Orbit and classification ==
Varsavia orbits the Sun in the central main-belt at a distance of 2.2–3.2 AU once every 4 years and 4 months (1,589 days). Its orbit has an eccentricity of 0.19 and an inclination of 29° with respect to the ecliptic. As no precoveries were taken, and no prior identifications were made, the body's observation arc begins with its official discovery observation at Uccle in 1933.

== Physical characteristics ==
Varsavia is an X-type asteroid in the Tholen taxonomy. In the SMASS classification, it is a Xc-type, that transitions to the carbonaceous C-type asteroids.

=== Rotation period ===
In April 2003, the first rotational lightcurve of Varsavia was obtained by American astronomer Brian Warner at his Palmer Divide Station in Colorado. Revised data gave a well-defined rotation period of 7.1639 hours with a brightness variation of 0.15 magnitude (U=3).

Another well defined period of 7.1680 hours (Δ0.15 mag) was derived from photometric observations taken by Australian astronomer Julian Oey at Leura Observatory in February 2011 (U=3). Concurring results were also obtained by Robert Stephens in April 2003 (7.231 h; Δ0.15 mag; U=2), from the Palomar Transient Factory in June 2012 (7.1659 h; Δ0.28 mag; U=2), and by the "Spanish Photometric Asteroid Analysis Group" (OBAS) in May 2016 (7.163 h; Δ0.12 mag; U=3-). Observations made with the TESS space telescope in 2018 gave a period of 7.1615 hours with an amplitude of 0.05 magnitude (U=2).

=== Diameter and albedo ===
According to the surveys carried out by the Infrared Astronomical Satellite IRAS, the Japanese Akari satellite, and NASA's Wide-field Infrared Survey Explorer with its subsequent NEOWISE mission, Varsavia measures between 34.15 and 51.44 kilometers in diameter, and its surface has an albedo between 0.042 and 0.10. The Collaborative Asteroid Lightcurve Link derives an albedo of 0.0874 and adopts a diameter of 41 kilometers, obtained from modeled data and a directly observed minor planet occultation of a star.

On July 18, 2003, a stellar occultation by 1263 Varsavia was observed at multiple sites. The measured chords yielded an equivalent diameter of 41±8 km. The profile best matched a spin vector of (λ_{p}, β_{p}) = (341°, −14°) in elliptical coordinates.

== Naming ==
This minor planet was named by Tadeusz Banachiewicz after the Latin name of the city of Warsaw, capital of Poland. The naming citation includes a note of thanks for the support given by the city's observatory. Naming citation was first published in German by Astronomisches Rechen-Institut (RI 843).
