= Cracovian =

In astronomical and geodetic calculations, Cracovians are a clerical convenience introduced in 1925 by Tadeusz Banachiewicz for solving systems of linear equations by hand. Such systems can be written as Ax = b in matrix notation where x and b are column vectors and the evaluation of b requires the multiplication of the rows of A by the vector x.

Cracovians introduced the idea of using the transpose of A, A^{T}, and multiplying the columns of A^{T} by the column x. This amounts to the definition of a new type of matrix multiplication denoted here by '∧'. Thus x ∧ A^{T} = b = Ax. The Cracovian product of two matrices, say A and B, is defined by A ∧ B = B^{T}A, where B^{T} and A are assumed compatible for the common (Cayley) type of matrix multiplication.

Since (AB)^{T} = B^{T}A^{T}, the products (A ∧ B) ∧ C and A ∧ (B ∧ C) will generally be different; thus, Cracovian multiplication is non-associative. Cracovians are an example of a quasigroup.

Cracovians adopted a column-row convention for designating individual elements as opposed to the standard row-column convention of matrix analysis. This made manual multiplication easier, as one needed to follow two parallel columns (instead of a vertical column and a horizontal row in the matrix notation.) It also sped up computer calculations, because both factors' elements were used in a similar order, which was more compatible with the sequential access memory in computers of those times — mostly magnetic tape memory and drum memory. Use of Cracovians in astronomy faded as computers with bigger random access memory came into general use. Any modern reference to them is in connection with their non-associative multiplication.

Named for recognition of the City of Kraków.

== In programming ==
In R the desired effect can be achieved via the crossprod() function. Specifically, the Cracovian product of matrices A and B can be obtained as crossprod(B, A).
