= 1683 Castafiore =

Main-belt asteroid

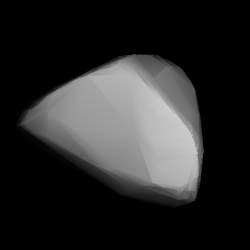
- Shape model of Castafiore from its lightcurve

Discovery
- Discovered by: S. Arend
- Discovery site: Uccle Obs.
- Discovery date: 19 September 1950

Designations
- Named after: Bianca Castafiore (fictional character)
- Alternative designations: 1950 SL · 1936 PH; 1949 HA · 1959 TH
- Minor planet category: main-belt · (middle)

Orbital characteristics
- Epoch 4 September 2017 (JD 2458000.5)
- Uncertainty parameter 0
- Observation arc: 80.55 yr (29,420 days)
- Aphelion: 3.2165 AU
- Perihelion: 2.2554 AU
- Semi-major axis: 2.7360 AU
- Eccentricity: 0.1756
- Orbital period (sidereal): 4.53 yr (1,653 days)
- Mean anomaly: 331.16°
- Mean motion: 0° 13^{m} 4.08^{s} / day
- Inclination: 12.476°
- Longitude of ascending node: 326.66°
- Argument of perihelion: 346.87°

Physical characteristics
- Dimensions: 18.42±0.79 km 21.159±0.114; 21.403±0.075 km 25.44 km (calculated)
- Synodic rotation period: 13.931±0.003 h (Note: Pray (2011): rotation period of 13.931±0.003 hours with an amplitude in brightness of 0.66 in magnitude. Summary figure given at Light curve Database for (1683) Castafiore)
- Geometric albedo: 0.057 (assumed); 0.0888±0.0159; 0.119±0.017; 0.160±0.013
- Spectral type: C
- Absolute magnitude (H): 11.6 · 11.66±0.46 · 11.7

1683 Castafiore, provisional designation 1950 SL, is a carbonaceous background asteroid from the central region of the asteroid belt, approximately 21 kilometers in diameter. It was discovered on 19 September 1950, by Belgian astronomer Sylvain Arend at Royal Observatory of Belgium in Uccle, Belgium, and named after the character Bianca Castafiore from The Adventures of Tintin.

== Orbit and classification ==
The C-type asteroid orbits the Sun in the middle main-belt at a distance of 2.3–3.2 AU once every 4 years and 6 months (1,653 days). Its orbit has an eccentricity of 0.18 and an inclination of 12° with respect to the ecliptic.

== Naming ==
This minor planet was named for Bianca Castafiore, a fictional character in the comic-strip Adventures of Tintin . On the occasion of his seventy-fifth birthday, the father of the fictional character, Georges Remi, better known under his pseudonym Hergé, was honoured by the minor planet 1652 Hergé. The approved naming citation was published by the Minor Planet Center on 8 April 1982 (M.P.C. 6832).

== Physical characteristics ==
=== Rotation period ===
In September 2004, American astronomer Donald P. Pray obtained a rotational lightcurve of Castafiore from photometric observations. It gave a rotation period of 13.931 hours with a brightness variation of 0.66 magnitude (U=2+).

=== Diameter and albedo ===
According to the survey carried out by NASA's Wide-field Infrared Survey Explorer with its subsequent NEOWISE mission, Castafiore measures 21.15 kilometers in diameter and its surface has an albedo of 0.160 (best result only), while the Collaborative Asteroid Lightcurve Link assumes a standard albedo for carbonaceous asteroids of 0.057, and calculates a diameter of 25.44 kilometers with an absolute magnitude of 11.7.
