= Chronocinematograph =

Astronomical instrument

3D rendering of a Chronocinematograph

Chronocinematograph is an astronomical instrument consisting of a film camera, chronometer and chronograph. The device records images using a more precise timetable for observing an eclipse. It was invented in 1927 by a Polish astronomer, mathematician and geodesist Tadeusz Banachiewicz for observing total solar eclipses. During the same year, Banachiewcz used his device for solar observations in Lapland (Sweden), then in the US (1932) and Greece, Japan and Siberia (1936).

The invention enhanced the precision for determining the time of an eclipse, due to more precisely timed photos of Baily's beads, and quantifying the duration of totality. This could not have been observed as closely as before due to the brightness of the sun.
