= Sylvain Arend =

Belgian astronomer (1902–1992)

Minor planets discovered: 51
see § List of discovered minor planets

Sylvain Julien Victor Arend (6 August 1902 – 18 February 1992) was a Belgian astronomer born in Robelmont, Luxembourg province, Belgium. His main interest was astrometry.

Together with Georges Roland, he discovered the bright comet C/1956 R1 (Arend-Roland). He also discovered, or co-discovered, the periodic comets 49P/Arend-Rigaux and 50P/Arend, Nova Scuti 1952, and a number of asteroids, including notably the Amor asteroid 1916 Boreas and the Trojan asteroid 1583 Antilochus. He also discovered 1652 Hergé which is named after Hergé, the creator of The Adventures of Tintin. The asteroid 1563 Noël is named after his son, Emanuel Arend.

In 1948, Arend started together with sixteen other people the skeptic organisation Comité Para. The outer main-belt asteroid 1502 Arenda was named in his honor.

== List of discovered minor planets ==
1127 Mimi	13 January 1929
1171 Rusthawelia	3 October 1930
1262 Sniadeckia	23 March 1933
1263 Varsavia	23 March 1933
1281 Jeanne	25 August 1933
1286 Banachiewicza	25 August 1933
1287 Lorcia	25 August 1933
1313 Berna	24 August 1933
1314 Paula	16 September 1933
1315 Bronislawa	16 September 1933
1348 Michel	23 March 1933
1352 Wawel	3 February 1935
1563 Noël	7 March 1943
1565 Lemaître	25 November 1948
1570 Brunonia	9 October 1948
1573 Väisälä	27 October 1949
1576 Fabiola	30 September 1948
1579 Herrick	30 September 1948
1583 Antilochus	19 September 1950
1591 Baize	31 May 1951
1592 Mathieu	1 June 1951
1593 Fagnes	1 June 1951
1613 Smiley	16 September 1950
1625 The NORC	1 September 1953
1633 Chimay	3 March 1929

1639 Bower	12 September 1951
1640 Nemo	31 August 1951
1652 Hergé	9 August 1953
1683 Castafiore	19 September 1950
1717 Arlon	8 January 1954
1787 Chiny	19 September 1950
1887 Virton	5 October 1950
1916 Boreas	1 September 1953
1969 Alain	3 February 1935
2084 Okayama	7 February 1935
2109 Dhotel	13 October 1950
2231 Durrell	21 September 1941
2265 Verbaandert	17 February 1950
2277 Moreau	18 February 1950
2455 Somville	5 October 1950
2513 Baetslé	19 September 1950
2538 Vanderlinden	30 October 1954
2642 Vésale	14 September 1961
2666 Gramme	8 October 1951
2689 Bruxelles	3 February 1935
2866 Hardy	7 October 1961
2973 Paola	10 January 1951
3228 Pire	8 February 1935
3346 Gerla	27 September 1951
3755 Lecointe	19 September 1950
3920 Aubignan	28 November 1948

== List of discovered comets ==
Comets discovered: 3
49P/Arend–Rigaux	5 February 1951
50P/Arend	4 October 1951
C/1956 R1 (Arend–Roland)	6 November 1956
