= 49P/Arend–Rigaux =

Periodic comet

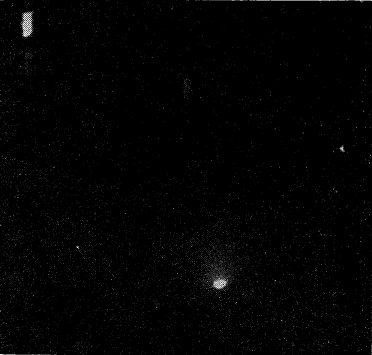
- Comet Arend–Rigaux imaged by George van Biesbroeck from the Yerkes Observatory on 10 February 1951.

Discovery
- Discovered by: Sylvain Arend; Fernand Rigaux
- Discovery site: Royal Observatory of Belgium
- Discovery date: 5 February 1951

Designations
- MPC designation: P/1951 C2, P/1958 B1
- Alternative designations: 1950 VII, 1957 VII; 1964 V, 1971 IV; 1978 III, 1984 XXI; 1991 XVII

Orbital characteristics
- Epoch: 5 May 2025 (JD 2460800.5)
- Observation arc: 75.48 years (Note: Observation arc from the Minor Planet Center database covering dates from 8 January 1951 until 3 July 2026.)
- Earliest precovery date: 8 January 1951
- Number of observations: 4,855
- Aphelion: 5.709 AU
- Perihelion: 1.431 AU
- Semi-major axis: 3.570 AU
- Eccentricity: 0.59906
- Orbital period: 6.745 years
- Inclination: 19.059°
- Longitude of ascending node: 118.79°
- Argument of periapsis: 332.93°
- Mean anomaly: 3.564°
- Last perihelion: 10 April 2025
- Next perihelion: 8 January 2032
- T_{Jupiter}: 2.711
- Earth MOID: 0.466 AU
- Jupiter MOID: 0.154 AU

Physical characteristics
- Mean radius: 4.24 km (2.63 mi)
- Synodic rotation period: 13.452 hours
- Geometric albedo: 0.028
- Comet total magnitude (M1): 13.9

49P/Arend–Rigaux is a periodic comet with a 6.75-year orbit around the Sun. It is the first of three comets discovered by Belgian astronomer Sylvain Arend and the only one for Fernand Rigaux.

== Observational history ==
=== Discovery ===
While on a routine search for new asteroids in the sky, Sylvain Arend and Fernand Rigaux discovered a new comet on the night of 5 February 1951. It was a diffuse 11th-magnitude object within the constellation Canis Minor. (Note: Reported initial position upon discovery was: α = 7^{h} 22.8^{m} , δ = 23° 39′)

== Physical characteristics ==
=== Nucleus size ===
The first physical measurements of its nucleus in 1985 revealed that it has a geometric albedo of 0.028, placing it as one of the darkest objects in the Solar System, which is even compared to D-type asteroids and C/1983 H1. These initial measurements suggest that the nucleus is elongated and has an effective radius between 3.8–5.1 km (2.4–3.2 mi). Photometry of direct thermal emission taken in the same year suggested a nuclear radius of 4.8 ± 0.4 km (2.98 ± 0.25 mi). In 2004, a definitive radii measurement based on previous studies found that the nucleus is 4.24 km (2.63 mi) across.

=== Rotation ===
Initial CCD photometry taken during its 1984/1985 apparition revealed a cyclic variation in the comet's brightness indicating a rotation period between 6.78±0.08 to 9.78±0.08 hours. This is later revised to 13.47 hours following the reanalysis of narrow-band photometry in visible and near-ultraviolet spectrum. Follow-up observations during its 2012 apparition found it has a double-peaked lightcurve change, which revealed it has a retrograde synodic rotation period lasting 13.452 hours instead.

=== Other features ===
Analysis of infrared observations from Spitzer obtained in 2006 combined with ground observations in 2012 revealed a broad tail-like feature and a narrow jet emitting subsurface volatiles, specifically amorphous water ice, that have recently been exposed by comet's multiple passes from the Sun.

== Orbit ==
As of 2025, comet Arend–Rigaux orbits the Sun at distances between 1.43 AU (214 million km) and 5.71 AU (854 million km), inclined about 19 degrees from the ecliptic.

The first orbital calculations for Arend–Rigaux were taken by Joseph L. Brady and Nevin Sherman on 19 February 1951. Leland E. Cunningham noted that the comet's preliminary orbit somewhat resembles that of 69P/Taylor, which was a lost comet at the time. In 1954, Vitaly A. Bronshten hypothesized that Arend–Rigaux is one of two fragments of comet Taylor, with the second one returning as D/1952 B1 (Harrington–Wilson) a year later after 49P. However, the connection between the two comets were later disproven, and comet Taylor itself would not be rediscovered until 1977.

On 20 December 2058 the comet will pass 0.0867 AU (12.97 million km) from Mars.

== Bibliography ==
- Kronk, Gary W.; Meyer, Maik; Seargent, David A. J. (2009). Cometography: A Catalog of Comets. Vol. 4: 1933–1959. Cambridge University Press. ISBN 978-0-521-58507-1.
- Kronk, Gary W.; Meyer, Maik; Seargent, David A. J. (2010). Cometography: A Catalog of Comets. Vol. 5: 1960–1982. Cambridge University Press. ISBN 978-0-521-87226-3.
- Kronk, Gary W.; Meyer, Maik; Seargent, David A. J. (2017). Cometography: A Catalog of Comets. Vol. 6: 1983–1993. Cambridge University Press. ISBN 978-0-521-87216-4.

Numbered comets
Previous; 48P/Johnson	49P/Arend–Rigaux	Next; 50P/Arend
