= 1287 Lorcia =

Asteroid

Discovery
- Discovered by: S. Arend
- Discovery site: Uccle Obs.
- Discovery date: 25 August 1933

Designations
- Named after: Laura de Sołohub Dikyj (wife of Tadeusz Banachiewicz)
- Alternative designations: 1933 QL · 1954 TG
- Minor planet category: main-belt · (outer); Eos

Orbital characteristics
- Epoch 4 September 2017 (JD 2458000.5)
- Uncertainty parameter 0
- Observation arc: 83.30 yr (30,426 days)
- Aphelion: 3.2024 AU
- Perihelion: 2.8214 AU
- Semi-major axis: 3.0119 AU
- Eccentricity: 0.0632
- Orbital period (sidereal): 5.23 yr (1,909 days)
- Mean anomaly: 274.29°
- Mean motion: 0° 11^{m} 18.96^{s} / day
- Inclination: 9.8207°
- Longitude of ascending node: 202.53°
- Argument of perihelion: 267.81°

Physical characteristics
- Dimensions: 21.678±0.101 km
- Geometric albedo: 0.140±0.024
- Spectral type: B–V = 0.850; U–B = 0.360
- Absolute magnitude (H): 11.07

1287 Lorcia, provisional designation 1933 QL, is an Eoan asteroid from the outer regions of the asteroid belt, approximately 22 kilometers in diameter. It was discovered by Belgian astronomer Sylvain Arend at the Royal Observatory of Belgium in Uccle on 25 August 1933. The asteroid was named for Laura de Sołohub Dikyj, wife of Polish astronomer Tadeusz Banachiewicz.

== Orbit and classification ==
Lorcia is a member the Eos family (606), the largest asteroid family in the outer main belt consisting of nearly 10,000 asteroids. It orbits the Sun in the outer main-belt at a distance of 2.8–3.2 AU once every 5 years and 3 months (1,909 days). Its orbit has an eccentricity of 0.06 and an inclination of 10° with respect to the ecliptic. The body's observation arc begins with its official discovery observation at Uccle.

== Physical characteristics ==
=== Rotation period ===
As of 2017, no rotational lightcurve of Lorcia has been obtained from photometric observations. The asteroid's rotation period, poles and shape remain unknown.

=== Diameter and albedo ===
According to the survey carried out by the NEOWISE mission of NASA's Wide-field Infrared Survey Explorer, Lorcia measures 21.678 kilometers in diameter and its surface has an albedo of 0.140.

== Naming ==
This minor planet was named by Polish astronomer Tadeusz Banachiewicz (1882–1954) after his wife Laura de Sołohub Dikyj. Banachiewicz was also a prominent mathematician and geodesist, as well as the vice-president of the International Astronomical Union in the 1930s. The asteroid 1286 Banachiewicza, also discovered by Sylvain Arend, was named in his honor. The official naming citation was mentioned in The Names of the Minor Planets by Paul Herget in 1955 (H 118).
