= 1281 Jeanne =

Dark asteroid from the background population of the intermediate asteroid belt

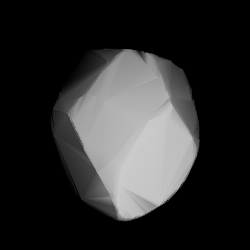
- Modelled shape of Jeanne from its lightcurve

Discovery
- Discovered by: S. Arend
- Discovery site: Uccle Obs.
- Discovery date: 25 August 1933

Designations
- Named after: Jeanne Arend (discoverer's daughter)
- Alternative designations: 1933 QJ · 1929 RG; 1938 YL · A904 NA
- Minor planet category: main-belt · (middle); background

Orbital characteristics
- Epoch 4 September 2017 (JD 2458000.5)
- Uncertainty parameter 0
- Observation arc: 112.73 yr (41,173 days)
- Aphelion: 3.0888 AU
- Perihelion: 2.0223 AU
- Semi-major axis: 2.5555 AU
- Eccentricity: 0.2087
- Orbital period (sidereal): 4.09 yr (1,492 days)
- Mean anomaly: 232.49°
- Mean motion: 0° 14^{m} 28.68^{s} / day
- Inclination: 7.4473°
- Longitude of ascending node: 210.11°
- Argument of perihelion: 72.775°

Physical characteristics
- Mean diameter: 14.26±5.17 km 21.65±1.7 km 21.65±3.82 km 23.16±0.30 km 25.716±0.108 km 27.620±0.150 km
- Synodic rotation period: 15.18±0.06 h
- Pole ecliptic latitude: (153.0°, 19°) (λ_{1}/β_{1}); (338.0°, 32.0°) (λ_{2}/β_{2})
- Geometric albedo: 0.0530±0.0074; 0.058±0.007; 0.079±0.003; 0.0863 (derived); 0.0864±0.016; 0.09±0.04; 0.17±0.08
- Spectral type: X · P
- Absolute magnitude (H): 11.36±0.32 · 11.50 · 11.60 · 11.78

1281 Jeanne (prov. designation: 1933 QJ) is a dark asteroid from the background population of the intermediate asteroid belt. It was discovered on 25 August 1933, by astronomer Sylvain Arend at the Royal Observatory of Belgium in Uccle, who named it after his daughter, Jeanne. The likely P-type asteroid has a rotation period of 15.2 hours and measures approximately 22 kilometers (14 miles) in diameter.

== Orbit and classification ==
Jeanne is a non-family asteroid of the main belt's background population when applying the hierarchical clustering method to its proper orbital elements. It orbits the Sun in the central asteroid belt at a distance of 2.0–3.1 AU once every 4 years and 1 month (1,492 days; semi-major axis of 2.56 AU). Its orbit has an eccentricity of 0.21 and an inclination of 7° with respect to the ecliptic. The asteroid was first identified in July 1904, as A904 NA at Heidelberg Observatory, where the body's observation arc begins in September 1929, almost four years prior to its official discovery observation at Uccle.

== Naming ==
This minor planet was named after Jeanne Arend, daughter of Belgian discoverer Sylvain Arend. The official naming citation was mentioned in The Names of the Minor Planets by Paul Herget in 1955 (H 117).

== Physical characteristics ==
Jeanne has been characterized as both an X-type and P-type asteroid by the Wide-field Infrared Survey Explorer (WISE) and Pan-STARRS photometric survey, respectively.

=== Rotation period and poles ===
In May 2002, a rotational lightcurve of Jeanne was obtained from photometric observations by French amateur astronomer Christophe Demeautis. Lightcurve analysis gave a rotation period of 15.18 hours with a brightness amplitude of 0.45 magnitude (U=2). A lightcurve was also modeled using photometric data from the Lowell Photometric Database. It gave a concurring sidereal period of 15.30379±0.00001 hours and two spin axes at (153.0°, 19°) and (338.0°, 32.0°) in ecliptic coordinates (λ, β).

=== Diameter and albedo ===
According to the surveys carried out by the Infrared Astronomical Satellite IRAS, the Japanese Akari satellite and the NEOWISE mission of NASA's WISE telescope, Jeanne measures between 14.26 and 27.620 kilometers in diameter and its surface has an albedo between 0.053 and 0.17. The Collaborative Asteroid Lightcurve Link derives an albedo of 0.0863 and a diameter of 21.65 kilometers based on an absolute magnitude of 11.6.
