= 1286 Banachiewicza =

Asteroid

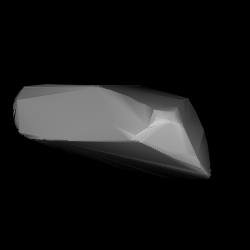
- Modelled shape of Banachiewicza

Discovery
- Discovered by: S. Arend
- Discovery site: Uccle Obs.
- Discovery date: 25 August 1933

Designations
- Named after: Tadeusz Banachiewicz (Polish astronomer)
- Alternative designations: 1933 QH · 1928 SE; 1954 UJ
- Minor planet category: main-belt · (outer); Eos

Orbital characteristics
- Epoch 4 September 2017 (JD 2458000.5)
- Uncertainty parameter 0
- Observation arc: 88.78 yr (32,428 days)
- Aphelion: 3.2926 AU
- Perihelion: 2.7553 AU
- Semi-major axis: 3.0240 AU
- Eccentricity: 0.0888
- Orbital period (sidereal): 5.26 yr (1,921 days)
- Mean anomaly: 29.653°
- Mean motion: 0° 11^{m} 14.64^{s} / day
- Inclination: 9.7486°
- Longitude of ascending node: 200.46°
- Argument of perihelion: 107.58°

Physical characteristics
- Mean diameter: 21.474±0.208 km; 21.84±0.49 km; 22.569±0.129 km
- Synodic rotation period: 8.631±0.001 h
- Pole ecliptic latitude: (214.0°, 62.0°) (λ_{1}/β_{1}); (64.0°, 60.0°) (λ_{2}/β_{2})
- Geometric albedo: 0.1554±0.0270; 0.170±0.014; 0.171±0.009
- Spectral type: Tholen = S B–V = 0.850; U–B = 0.430
- Absolute magnitude (H): 10.626±0.009 (R) · 10.88

1286 Banachiewicza (prov. designation: 1933 QH) is an elongated Eos asteroid from the outer regions of the asteroid belt. It was discovered on 25 August 1933, by Belgian astronomer Sylvain Arend at the Royal Observatory of Belgium in Uccle. The stony S-type asteroid has a rotation period of 8.6 hours and measures approximately 21 kilometers (13 miles) in diameter. It was named after Polish astronomer Tadeusz Banachiewicz.

== Orbit and classification ==
Banachiewicza is a member the Eos family (606), the largest asteroid family in the outer main belt consisting of nearly 10,000 asteroids. It orbits the Sun at a distance of 2.8–3.3 AU once every 5 years and 3 months (1,921 days). Its orbit has an eccentricity of 0.09 and an inclination of 10° with respect to the ecliptic. The body's observation arc begins with its first observation as 1928 SE at Heidelberg Observatory in September 1928, almost five years prior to its official discovery observation at Uccle.

== Naming ==
This minor planet was named after Polish astronomer Tadeusz Banachiewicz (1882–1954), who was also a prominent mathematician and geodesist, as well as the director of the Kraków Observatory (055) and vice-president of the International Astronomical Union in the 1930s. The subsequently numbered asteroid 1287 Lorcia – also discovered by Sylvain Arend, and also an Eoan asteroid – was named after his wife. The official naming citation was mentioned in The Names of the Minor Planets by Paul Herget in 1955 (H 118). The lunar crater Banachiewicz was also named in his honor.

== Physical characteristics ==
In the Tholen classification, Banachiewicza is a stony S-type asteroid, while the overall spectral type of the Eos family is that of a K-type.

=== Rotation period and poles ===
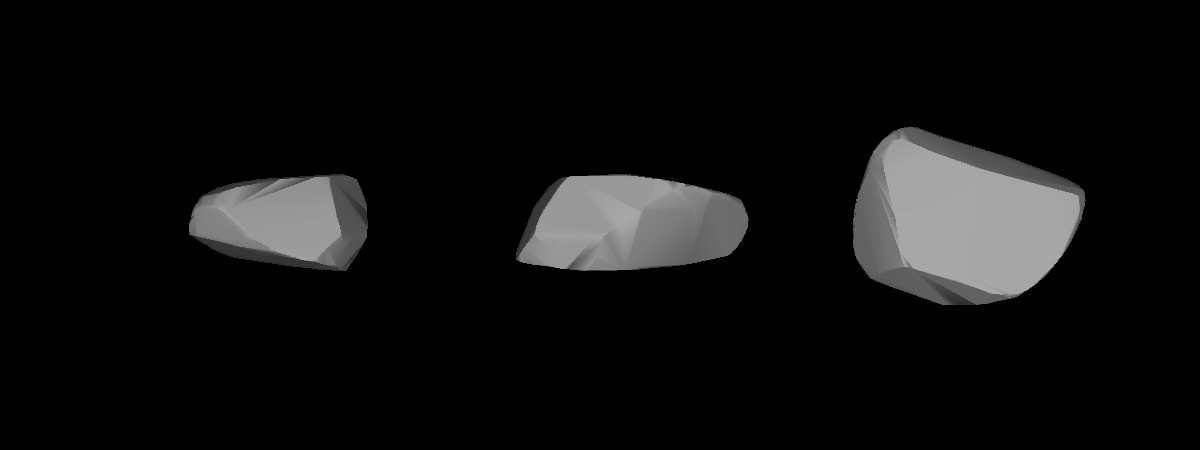
Lightcurve-based 3D-model of Banachiewicza

In August 2008, the best-rated rotational lightcurve of Banachiewicza was obtained from photometric observations by French amateur astronomers Laurent Bernasconi, Cyril Cavadore and Stéphane Charbonnel. Lightcurve analysis gave a rotation period of 8.631 hours with a brightness variation of 0.54 magnitude, indicative for an irregular, elongated shape (U=3).

Other observations at the Palomar Transient Factory in California, and by a collaboration of Hungarian astronomers gave a period of 8.628 and 5 hours with an amplitude of 0.36 and 0.4 magnitude, respectively (U=2/2). In 2013, an international study modeled a lightcurve with a concurring period of 8.63043±0.00005 hours and found two spin axis of (214.0°, 62.0°) and (64.0°, 60.0°) in ecliptic coordinates (λ, β) (Q=2).

=== Diameter and albedo ===
According to the surveys carried out by the Japanese Akari satellite and the NEOWISE mission of NASA's Wide-field Infrared Survey Explorer, Banachiewicza measures between 21.474 and 22.569 kilometers in diameter and its surface has an albedo between 0.1554 and 0.171. The Collaborative Asteroid Lightcurve Link assumes a standard albedo for stony asteroids of 0.20 and calculates a diameter of 19.82 kilometers based on an absolute magnitude of 10.88.
