= 2513 Baetslé =

Main-belt asteroid

Discovery
- Discovered by: S. Arend
- Discovery site: Uccle Obs.
- Discovery date: 19 September 1950

Designations
- Named after: Paul-Louis Baetslé
- Alternative designations: 1950 SH · 1936 PC; 1943 RA · 1943 RC; 1950 TK · 1950 TW_{2} 1964 VO_{2} · 1971 UH_{3} 1974 QV · 1981 QO
- Minor planet category: main-belt · Flora

Orbital characteristics
- Epoch 4 September 2017 (JD 2458000.5)
- Uncertainty parameter 0
- Observation arc: 73.57 yr (26,870 days)
- Aphelion: 2.7004 AU
- Perihelion: 1.8713 AU
- Semi-major axis: 2.2859 AU
- Eccentricity: 0.1813
- Orbital period (sidereal): 3.46 yr (1,262 days)
- Mean anomaly: 138.26°
- Inclination: 3.1618°
- Longitude of ascending node: 257.61°
- Argument of perihelion: 97.789°

Physical characteristics
- Dimensions: 5.013±0.080; 5.054±0.086 km 16.67±1.8 km 16.69 km (derived)
- Synodic rotation period: 6.0792±0.0004 h (Note: Pravec (2009) web: rotation period 6.0792±0.0004 hours with a brightness amplitude of 0.32 mag. Summary figures at Collaborative Asteroid Lightcurve Link (CALL) for (2513) Baetsle)
- Geometric albedo: 0.0278±0.007; 0.0333 (derived); 0.221±0.021; 0.3032±0.0453
- Spectral type: S
- Absolute magnitude (H): 13.20 · 13.27±0.27 · 13.4

2513 Baetslé, provisional designation 1950 SH, is a stony Flora asteroid from the inner regions of the asteroid belt, approximately 16 kilometers in diameter.

It was discovered on 19 September 1950, by Belgian astronomer Sylvain Arend at the Royal Observatory in Uccle, Belgium. It was later named after astronomer Paul-Louis Baetslé.

== Orbit and classification ==
Baetslé is a member of the Flora family, one of the largest groups of rather bright and stony asteroids, and orbits the Sun in the inner main-belt at a distance of 1.9–2.7 AU once every 3 years and 6 months (1,262 days). Its orbit has an eccentricity of 0.18 and an inclination of 3° with respect to the ecliptic. Its orbit is almost coplanar. Its first used observation dates back to 1943, when it was identified as 1943 RA at Heidelberg Observatory, extending the body's observation arc by 7 years prior to its official discovery observation.

== Physical characteristics ==
Baetslé takes 6.08 hours for a full a rotation around its axis. Two observations by the Infrared Astronomical Satellite, IRAS, showed an absolute magnitude of 13.40 and a low geometric albedo of 0.03. While the size, rotational period and orbital data are commonly found among main-belt asteroids, the albedo was exceptionally low and suggested that the body's composition could be mostly carbonaceous.

However, subsequent observations by the Wide-field Infrared Survey Explorer's NEOWISE mission gave a higher albedo of 0.22 and 0.30 and the Collaborative Asteroid Lightcurve Link derives a value of 0.33, assuming the body to be of a stony rather than of a carbonaceous composition. This also concurs with the fact that Baetslé is a member of the Flora family of rather bright and stony asteroids.

== Naming ==
This minor planet was named in memory of Belgian astronomer Paul-Louis Baetslé (1909–1983), professor at the Brussels Royal Military School and a friend of Sylvain Arend. The official naming citation was published on 20 December 1983 (M.P.C. 8404).
