= 50P/Arend =

Jupiter-family comet

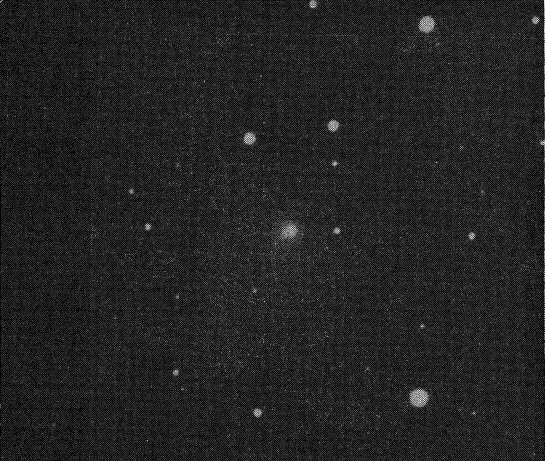
- Comet 50P/Arend photographed by George van Biesbroeck on 4 November 1951

Discovery
- Discovered by: Sylvian Arend
- Discovery date: 4 October 1951

Designations
- MPC designation: P/1951 T1, P/1959 N1
- Alternative designations: 1951 X, 1959 V, 1967 VI; 1975 VI, 1983 VIII; 1991 VIII

Orbital characteristics
- Epoch: 21 November 2025 (JD 2461000.5)
- Observation arc: 73.58 years (Note: Observation arc from the Minor Planet Center database covering dates from 1 October 1951 until 2 May 2025.)
- Earliest precovery date: 1 October 1951
- Number of observations: 1,984
- Aphelion: 6.252 AU
- Perihelion: 1.922 AU
- Semi-major axis: 4.087 AU
- Eccentricity: 0.5297
- Orbital period: 8.26a
- Inclination: 19.100°
- Last perihelion: 12 May 2024
- Next perihelion: 7 August 2032

Physical characteristics
- Mean radius: 0.95 km (0.59 mi)
- Geometric albedo: 0.04 (assumed)
- Spectral type: (V–R) = 0.81±0.10; (R–I) = 0.26±0.09
- Comet total magnitude (M1): 13.9

Comet Arend or 50P/Arend is a periodic comet in the Solar System which was discovered on October 4, 1951. It was discovered by astronomer Sylvain Julien Victor Arend at the Royal Observatory of Belgium located in the municipality of Uccle. The comet was illustrated at approximately a magnitude of 14 and also exhibited a nucleus within a coma 14 arc seconds across. It has been observed on its every subsequent apparition since discovery, with the most recent one occurred in 2024. The comet's next perihelion will be in the year 2032.

== Observations ==
50P/Arend was observed at its brightest at a maximum magnitude of 14 when it was discovered in 1951. At the comet's next apparition on September 1, 1959, did not exceed 17 if it had not been for an outburst in November which affected its brightness to magnitude 15.5. The observed orbital period was 7.8 years at the time of its discovery however at each succeeding perihelion has led to less favorable observations due to its 0.64 astronomical units (AU) as it approached Jupiter in 1969, even if its maximum magnitude was 15. This approach also led to the comet's orbital period to increase to 8.0 years.

Long-term motion studies conducted by Brian G. Marsden on the comet 50P/Arend renders the comet's orbital eccentricity at 0.5 which makes it relatively undisturbed by Jupiter over the last 200-year cycles despite as passage of only 0.49 AU. The study was conducted inside the interval where libration happens. Several comets, namely 50P/Arend, 4P/Faye, 6P/d'Arrest, 22P/Kopff, 36P/Whipple, 78P/Gehrels, 92P/Sanguin, 4015 Wilson-Harrington, and 128P/Shoemaker-Holt, were observed at the Palomar Observatory. Visible coma activity was only observed from 4P/Faye and 50P/Arend out of the 9 other comets from data obtained in May 2000 and March 2001. There have been 1069 observations from October 8, 1951, to February 19, 2008, also where its mean residual is at 0".60.

The nucleus of the comet has a radius of 0.95 ± 0.03 kilometers, assuming a geometric albedo of 0.04.

== Notes ==
Numbered comets
Previous; 49P/Arend–Rigaux	50P/Arend	Next; 51P/Harrington
