= 1717 Arlon =

Binary Florian asteroid from the inner regions of the asteroid belt

Discovery
- Discovered by: S. Arend
- Discovery site: Uccle Obs.
- Discovery date: 8 January 1954

Designations
- Named after: Arlon (Municipality of Belgium)
- Alternative designations: 1954 AC · 1930 YU; 1941 BJ · 1946 UB; 1951 GQ · 1954 CE; 1977 FQ_{3} · 1978 PC_{5} A915 CC
- Minor planet category: main-belt · Flora

Orbital characteristics
- Epoch 4 September 2017 (JD 2458000.5)
- Uncertainty parameter 0
- Observation arc: 85.66 yr (31,289 days)
- Aphelion: 2.4797 AU
- Perihelion: 1.9111 AU
- Semi-major axis: 2.1954 AU
- Eccentricity: 0.1295
- Orbital period (sidereal): 3.25 yr (1,188 days)
- Mean anomaly: 224.11°
- Mean motion: 0° 18^{m} 10.8^{s} / day
- Inclination: 6.1881°
- Longitude of ascending node: 340.49°
- Argument of perihelion: 115.91°
- Known satellites: 1(D: 4 km · P: 18.2 h)

Physical characteristics
- Dimensions: 8.484±0.183; 8.57±0.58 km 8.87±0.74 km 9.128±0.166 km 9.15 km
- Synodic rotation period: 5.1082±0.0006 h 5.1477±0.00009 h (Note: Pravec (2011): Pravec (2011): rotation period of 5.14822±0.00009, 5.1496±0.0005 and 5.1477±0.0004 with a corresponding brightness amplitude of 0.07, 0.09 and 0.10 in magnitude. Summary figures at Asteroid Lightcurve Database for (1717) Arlon); 5.148 h 5.148±0.001 h 5.1484±0.0004 h (Note: Pravec (2005): rotation period 5.1484±0.0004 with a brightness amplitude of 0.08. Summary figures for (1717) Arlon at Asteroid Lightcurve Database); 5.1484 h 5.261±0.005 h
- Geometric albedo: 0.167±0.024; 0.225; 0.2492±0.0420; 0.287±0.048; 0.315±0.166
- Spectral type: Tholen = S · S
- Absolute magnitude (H): 11.94±0.08 (R) · 12.09±0.33 · 12.13 · 12.90 · 12.3 · 12.33 · 12.43±0.094

1717 Arlon, provisional designation 1954 AC, is a binary Florian asteroid from the inner regions of the asteroid belt, approximately 8.5 kilometers in diameter.

It was discovered on 8 January 1954, by Belgian astronomer Sylvain Arend at the Royal Observatory of Belgium in Uccle, Belgium, and later named for the Belgian town and provincial capital, Arlon.

== Classification and orbit ==
Arlon is a member of the Flora family, a collisional family of S-type asteroids asteroids, and one of the largest populations of the main-belt. It orbits the Sun in the inner main-belt at a distance of 1.9–2.5 AU once every 3 years and 3 months (1,188 days). Its orbit has an eccentricity of 0.13 and an inclination of 6° with respect to the ecliptic. First identified as A915 CC at Simeiz Observatory in 1915, Arlon's first used observation was taken at Lowell Observatory in 1930, when it was identified as 1930 YU, extending the body's observation arc by 24 years prior to its official discovery observation.

== Binary system ==
=== Primary ===
A large number of rotational lightcurves of Arlon were obtained from photometric observations, giving a well-defined rotation period between 5.1477 and 5.1496 hours with a small brightness variation of 0.10 magnitude or less (also see infobox).

=== Secondary ===
During one of these photometric observations in 2006, the binary nature of Arlon was revealed. The discovered asteroid moon orbits its primary once every 18.2 hours, at a distance of 16 kilometers. The moon itself measures approximately 4 kilometers in diameter.

== Diameter and albedo ==
According to the surveys carried out by the Japanese Akari satellite and NASA's Wide-field Infrared Survey Explorer with its subsequent NEOWISE mission, Arlon measures between 8.48 and 9.15 kilometers in diameter and its surface has an albedo between 0.167 and 0.315. The Collaborative Asteroid Lightcurve Link agrees with the revised WISE-results by Pravec, adopting an albedo of 0.225 and a diameter of 9.15 kilometers with an absolute magnitude of 12.43.

1717 Arlon has been observed to occult two stars, in 2021 and again in 2023.

== Naming ==
This minor planet was named for the Belgian town, municipality and provincial capital, Arlon. It is located on a hill above the source of the Semois river. In ancient times, Arlon was known as Orolaunum by the Romans and served as a station on the Antoninian way linking the cities Trier with Reims. The approved naming citation was published by the Minor Planet Center on 22 September 1983 (M.P.C. 8150).
