= 1576 Fabiola =

Asteroid

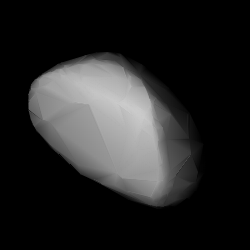
- Shape model of Fabiola from its lightcurve

Discovery
- Discovered by: S. Arend
- Discovery site: Uccle Obs.
- Discovery date: 30 September 1948

Designations
- Named after: Queen Fabiola of Belgium
- Alternative designations: 1948 SA · 1931 RV; 1931 TQ_{2} · 1933 BZ; 1939 CS · 1943 YA; 1948 TU_{1} · 1948 UJ; 1950 DZ
- Minor planet category: main-belt · (outer); Themis

Orbital characteristics
- Epoch 4 September 2017 (JD 2458000.5)
- Uncertainty parameter 0
- Observation arc: 85.66 yr (31,288 days)
- Aphelion: 3.6746 AU
- Perihelion: 2.6257 AU
- Semi-major axis: 3.1501 AU
- Eccentricity: 0.1665
- Orbital period (sidereal): 5.59 yr (2,042 days)
- Mean anomaly: 130.30°
- Mean motion: 0° 10^{m} 34.68^{s} / day
- Inclination: 0.9514°
- Longitude of ascending node: 166.62°
- Argument of perihelion: 244.20°

Physical characteristics
- Dimensions: 21.33±8.66 km 23.49±0.43 km 26.22±1.79 km 27.25±1.7 km 27.357±0.240 km 28.6±2.9 km 30±3 km 30.150±0.400 km
- Synodic rotation period: 6.7 h
- Geometric albedo: 0.0746±0.0139; 0.08±0.02; 0.0913±0.013; 0.100±0.015; 0.11±0.09; 0.115±0.015; 0.123±0.018
- Spectral type: Tholen = BU; B–V = 0.632; U–B = 0.405
- Absolute magnitude (H): 11.04 · 11.13 · 11.17±0.17

1576 Fabiola, provisional designation 1948 SA, is a Themistian asteroid from the outer regions of the asteroid belt, approximately 27 kilometers in diameter. It was discovered on 30 September 1948, by Belgian astronomer Sylvain Arend at the Royal Observatory of Belgium in Uccle. The asteroid was named after Queen Fabiola of Belgium.

== Orbit and classification ==
Fabiola is a Themistian asteroid that belongs to the Themis family (602), a very large family of carbonaceous asteroids, named after 24 Themis. It orbits the Sun in the outer main-belt at a distance of 2.6–3.7 AU once every 5 years and 7 months (2,042 days). Its orbit has an eccentricity of 0.17 and an inclination of 1° with respect to the ecliptic.

The asteroid was first identified as 1931 RV at Simeiz Observatory in September 1931. The body's observation arc begins with its identification as 1931 TQ_{2} at Lowell Observatory in October 1931, almost 17 years prior to its official discovery observation at Uccle.

== Physical characteristics ==
In the Tholen classification, Fabiola has an ambiguous spectral type, similar to the B-type asteroids ("bright" carbonaceous asteroids), yet with an "unusual" spectra (BU).

=== Rotation period ===
In November 1976, a rotational lightcurve of Fabiola was obtained from photometric observations by Swedish astronomer Claes-Ingvar Lagerkvist at Uppsala Observatory. Lightcurve analysis gave a rotation period of 6.7 hours with a brightness amplitude of 0.2 magnitude (U=2).

=== Diameter and albedo ===
According to the surveys carried out by the Infrared Astronomical Satellite IRAS, the Japanese Akari satellite and the NEOWISE mission of NASA's Wide-field Infrared Survey Explorer, Fabiola measures between 21.33 and 30.150 kilometers in diameter and its surface has an albedo between 0.0746 and 0.123.

The Collaborative Asteroid Lightcurve Link adopts the results obtained by IRAS, that is, an albedo of 0.0913 and a diameter of 27.25 kilometers based on an absolute magnitude of 11.04.

== Naming ==
This minor planet was named after Queen Fabiola of Belgium (1928–2014). The official naming citation was published by the Minor Planet Center on 31 January 1962 (M.P.C. 2116).
