= 1652 Hergé =

Asteroid

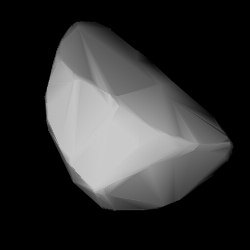
- Shape model of Hergé from its lightcurve

Discovery
- Discovered by: S. Arend
- Discovery site: Uccle Obs.
- Discovery date: 9 August 1953

Designations
- Named after: Georges Remi (Hergé) cartoonist
- Alternative designations: 1953 PA · 1933 UE_{1} 1939 HG
- Minor planet category: main-belt · Flora

Orbital characteristics
- Epoch 4 September 2017 (JD 2458000.5)
- Uncertainty parameter 0
- Observation arc: 83.41 yr (30,464 days)
- Aphelion: 2.5883 AU
- Perihelion: 1.9139 AU
- Semi-major axis: 2.2511 AU
- Eccentricity: 0.1498
- Orbital period (sidereal): 3.38 yr (1,234 days)
- Mean anomaly: 34.960°
- Inclination: 3.1989°
- Longitude of ascending node: 251.72°
- Argument of perihelion: 13.107°

Physical characteristics
- Dimensions: 8.689±0.081 km 8.954±0.083 km 9.41 km (calculated)
- Synodic rotation period: 16.36±0.02 h (Note: Pravec (2014) web (2014-09-18): rotation period of 16.36±0.02, 0.42 mag, (quality code of 3-). Summary figures for (1652) Herge at Asteroid Lightcurve Database and Pravec, P.; Wolf, M.; Sarounova, L. (2014)) (Note: lightcurve plot of (1652) Hergé. Lightcurve analysis by Petr Pravec)
- Geometric albedo: 0.1160±0.0215; 0.137±0.028; 0.24 (assumed); 0.308±0.060
- Spectral type: S
- Absolute magnitude (H): 12.20 · 12.3 · 12.54±0.19 · 13.2

1652 Hergé, provisional designation 1953 PA, is a stony Florian asteroid from the inner regions of the asteroid belt, approximately 9 kilometers in diameter. It was discovered on 9 August 1953, by Belgian astronomer Sylvain Arend at the Royal Observatory of Belgium in Uccle, Belgium. It was later named after Belgian cartoonist Hergé.

== Orbit and classification ==
Hergé is a member of the Flora family, one of the largest families of stony asteroids. It orbits the Sun in the inner main-belt at a distance of 1.9–2.6 AU once every 3 years and 5 months (1,234 days). Its orbit has an eccentricity of 0.15 and an inclination of 3° with respect to the ecliptic. It was first identified as 1933 UE_{1} at Heidelberg Observatory in 1933, extending the body's observation arc by 20 years prior to its official discovery observation.

== Physical characteristics ==
Hergé has been characterized as a common S-type asteroid by Pan-STARRS photometric survey.

=== Rotation period ===
Astronomer Petr Pravec obtained a rotational lightcurve of Hergé from photometric observations taken at Ondřejov Observatory in September 2014. It gave a rotation period of 16.36 hours with a brightness amplitude of 0.42 magnitude (U=3-).

=== Diameter and albedo ===
According to the survey carried out by NASA's Wide-field Infrared Survey Explorer with its subsequent NEOWISE mission, Hergé measures between 8.68 and 8.95 kilometers in diameter, and its surface has an albedo between 0.116 and 0.308. The Collaborative Asteroid Lightcurve Link assumes an albedo of 0.24 – derived from 8 Flora, the largest member and namesake of this orbital family – and calculates a diameter of 9.41 kilometers with an absolute magnitude of 12.54.

== Naming ==
This minor planet was named in honor of Belgian cartoonist Georges Remi, better known under his pseudonym Hergé. He is considered to be the father of the fictional Adventures of Tintin, one of the most popular European comics of the 20th century, and creator of its hero, Tintin, in 1929. The asteroid 1683 Castafiore was also named after the comic-strip character Bianca Castafiore from the series. The approved naming citation was published by the Minor Planet Center on 8 April 1982 (M.P.C. 6831).
