= 1916 Boreas =

Stony near-Earth asteroid

Discovery
- Discovered by: S. Arend
- Discovery site: Uccle Obs.
- Discovery date: 1 September 1953

Designations
- Pronunciation: /ˈbɔːriəs/
- Named after: Boreas (Greek mythology)
- Alternative designations: 1953 RA
- Minor planet category: NEO · Amor

Orbital characteristics
- Epoch 4 September 2017 (JD 2458000.5)
- Uncertainty parameter 0
- Observation arc: 63.73 yr (23,279 days)
- Aphelion: 3.2944 AU
- Perihelion: 1.2506 AU
- Semi-major axis: 2.2725 AU
- Eccentricity: 0.4497
- Orbital period (sidereal): 3.43 yr (1,251 days)
- Mean anomaly: 252.13°
- Mean motion: 0° 17^{m} 15.72^{s} / day
- Inclination: 12.884°
- Longitude of ascending node: 340.64°
- Argument of perihelion: 335.83°
- Earth MOID: 0.2520 AU · 98.2 LD

Physical characteristics
- Dimensions: 3.07 km (calculated); 3.5 km
- Synodic rotation period: 3.4741±0.0003 h (Note: Pravec (2001) web: rotation period 3.4748±0.0010 hours with a brightness amplitude of 0.28 mag. Behrend (2001) web: rotation period 3.4741±0.0003 hours with a brightness amplitude of 0.29 mag. Summary figures at Collaborative Asteroid Lightcurve Link (CALL) for (1916) Boreas); 3.4746 h 3.4746±0.0010 h 3.4748±0.0010 h 3.49±0.01 h
- Geometric albedo: 0.15 (assumed); 0.20 (assumed)
- Spectral type: S (Tholen), S (SMASS); S · Sw; B–V = 0.852; U–B = 0.407
- Absolute magnitude (H): 14.86±0.112 · 14.93

1916 Boreas, provisional designation 1953 RA, is an eccentric, stony asteroid and near-Earth object of the Amor group, approximately 3 kilometers in diameter. After its discovery in 1953, it became a lost asteroid until 1974. It was named after Boreas from Greek mythology.

== Discovery ==
Boreas was discovered on 1 September 1953, by Belgian astronomer Sylvain Arend at the Royal Observatory of Belgium in Uccle. The asteroid was observed for 2 months and then with time became a lost asteroid. It was recovered in 1974, by Richard Eugene McCrosky, G. Schwartz and JH Bulger based on a predicted position by Brian G. Marsden. (Note: Central Bureau for Astronomical Telegrams – 1953 RA This member of the Amor group, not observed since 1953 (cf. Minor Planet Circ. No. 3015), has been recovered by McCrosky, Schwartz and Bulger with the 155-cm reflector some 0o.3 from an unpublished prediction by B. G. Marsden International Astronomical Union Circular 2710 for (1953 RA))

== Orbit and classification ==
Boreas orbits the Sun at a distance of 1.3–3.3 AU once every 3 years and 5 months (1,251 days). Its orbit has an eccentricity of 0.45 and an inclination of 13° with respect to the ecliptic.

The near-Earth asteroid has an Earth minimum orbit intersection distance of 0.2520 AU (37,700,000 km), which corresponds to 98.2 lunar distances. Its observation arc begins with it official discovery observation at Uccle in 1953.

== Physical characteristics ==
On the Tholen and SMASS taxonomic scheme, Boreas is classified as a common S-type asteroid with a stony composition. It has also been characterized as a Sw-subtype.

Several rotational lightcurves gave a rotation period between 3.4741 and 3.49 hours with a brightness variation between 0.25 and 0.35 magnitude (U=2/2/3/n.a.).

In 1994, astronomer Tom Gehrels estimated Boreas to measure 3.5 kilometers in diameter, based on an assumed albedo of 0.15. The Collaborative Asteroid Lightcurve Link assumes a standard albedo for stony asteroids of 0.20 and calculates a diameter of 3.07 kilometers with an absolute magnitude of 14.93.

== Naming ==
This minor planet is named after the Greek god of the north wind, Boreas, as the asteroid was discovered moving rapidly northward after passing the ascending node of its orbit. The official naming citation was published by the Minor Planet Center on 8 April 1982 (M.P.C. 6833).
