= 1313 Berna =

Asteroid

Discovery
- Discovered by: S. Arend
- Discovery site: Uccle Obs.
- Discovery date: 24 August 1933

Designations
- Named after: Bern (capital of Switzerland)
- Alternative designations: 1933 QG · 1926 EA; A911 OA
- Minor planet category: main-belt · (middle) background

Orbital characteristics
- Epoch 27 April 2019 (JD 2458600.5)
- Uncertainty parameter 0
- Observation arc: 84.74 yr (30,953 d)
- Aphelion: 3.2074 AU
- Perihelion: 2.1112 AU
- Semi-major axis: 2.6593 AU
- Eccentricity: 0.2061
- Orbital period (sidereal): 4.34 yr (1,584 d)
- Mean anomaly: 241.65°
- Mean motion: 0° 13^{m} 38.28^{s} / day
- Inclination: 12.545°
- Longitude of ascending node: 298.14°
- Argument of perihelion: 99.773°
- Known satellites: 1(see 2nd infobox) (Note: International Astronomical Union Circular (No.8292), 23 February 2004 for (1313) BERNA: "Photometric observations obtained of the minor planet (1313) on eight nights during Feb. 6–16 show a lightcurve amplitude of 0.25 magnitude and suggest that this is a binary system with an orbital period of 1.061 ± 0.005 days, showing mutual eclipses and/or occultations near both rotational lightcurve minima with a duration of about 0.09 day and depth about 0.7 mag, the first being centered on Feb. 7.85 UT. The regular-appearing lightcurve is synchronized with the eclipse events, indicating that at least one of the two bodies is elongated and rotates synchronously with the orbital motion; the sharp eclipse/occultation events indicate that both components have approximately the same size. The maximum orbital separation observed from earth would be about 0".03." — Reported by R. Behrend, Geneva Observatory, on behalf of R. Roy, S. Sposetti, N. Waelchli, D. Pray, N. Berger, C. Demeautis, D.Matter, R. Durkee, A. Klotz, D. Starkey, and V. Cotrez))

Physical characteristics
- Mean diameter: 13.12±2.44 km 13.504±0.311 km 13.93±0.64 km 14.27±0.36 km 19.96±4.97 km
- Mass: (2.25±2.00)×10^{15} kg
- Mean density: 1.21±0.14 cm^{3}
- Synodic rotation period: 25.46 h
- Geometric albedo: 0.13; 0.169; 0.185; 0.212; 0.245
- Spectral type: S (assumed)
- Absolute magnitude (H): 11.55; 11.6; 11.69±0.12; 11.75; 11.80

1313 Berna, provisional designation 1933 QG, is a background asteroid and synchronous binary system from the Eunomian region in the central asteroid belt, approximately 14 kilometers (8.7 miles) in diameter. It was discovered on 24 August 1933, by Belgian astronomer Sylvain Arend at the Uccle Observatory in Belgium. The assumed S-type asteroid has a longer-than average rotation period of 25.5 hours and is likely elongated in shape. It was named for the Swiss capital of Bern. The discovery of an 11-kilometer-sized satellite was announced in February 2004.

== Orbit and classification ==
According to modern HCM-analyses by Nesvorný, as well as by Milani and Knežević, Berna is a non-family asteroid from the main belt's background population.

Based on osculating Keplerian orbital elements, it is located in the region of the Eunomia family (502), a prominent family of stony asteroids. It orbits the Sun in the central asteroid belt at a distance of 2.1–3.2 AU once every 4 years and 4 months (1,584 days; semi-major axis of 2.66 AU). Its orbit has an eccentricity of 0.21 and an inclination of 13° with respect to the ecliptic. In 1911, Berna was first identified as A911 OA at Johannesburg. Its observation arc begins with its official discovery observation at Uccle.

== Naming ==
This minor planet was named after the Swiss capital city of Bern. The name was proposed by Sigmund Mauderli (1876–1962), astronomer and director of the Astronomical Institute at the University of Bern, after whom 1748 Mauderli is named. He computed the definitive orbit of the body, and also insisted to rename the minor planet to its current name, after it had been originally published as "Bernia". The official naming citation was first mentioned in The Names of the Minor Planets by Paul Herget in 1955 (H 120).

== Physical characteristics ==
=== Lightcurve ===
A network of astronomers at several observatories including Raoul Behrend at Geneva Observatory, Switzerland, obtained the so-far best rated rotational light-curve of Berna. Light-curve analysis gave a rotation period of 25.464 hours with a brightness variation of 0.28 magnitude (U=3). In November 2007, photometric observations at Cerro Tololo, Chile, using its 0.9-meter Prompt5 telescope in combination with the Spitzer Space Telescope gave a concurring period of 25.46 hours with an amplitude of 0.5 magnitude (U=n.a.). Other light-curves were also obtained by several amateur astronomers giving a period of 6, 25.4 and 25.45 hours, respectively (U=1/2-/3-).

=== Satellite ===
Satellite
Discovery
- Discovered by: R. Behrend, R. Roy; S. Sposetti
- Discovery date: 6 February 2004
- Detection method: Light-curve

Orbital characteristics
- Semi-major axis: 25 km
- Orbital period (sidereal): 25.464±0.001 h
- Angular distance: 30 mas (maximum)
- Satellite of: 1313 Berna

Physical characteristics
- Dimensions: 8.37 km
- Apparent magnitude: Δ0.51 fainter than prim.
- Absolute magnitude (H): 12.8–13.0

In February 2004, a satellite orbiting the asteroid was discovered. The moon, which does not have a provisional designation, measures about 11 kilometers in diameter and orbits Berna at a distance of 35 kilometer once every 25 hours and 28 minutes. Since the lightcurve is synchronized with the eclipse events, at least one body of the binary system rotates synchronously with the orbital motion. It was identified based on light-curve observations taken in February 2004 by several astronomers, including Raoul Behrend at Geneva Observatory, Stefano Sposetti, René Roy, Donald Pray, Christophe Demeautis, Daniel Matter, Alain Klotz and others. Although the IAUC was released on 23 February 2004, the announcement was already made on 12 February 2004. There are several hundreds of asteroids known to have satellites (also see Category:Binary asteroids).

=== Diameter and albedo ===
According to the surveys carried out by the Japanese Akari satellite, NASA's Spitzer Space Telescope and the Wide-field Infrared Survey Explorer with its subsequent NEOWISE mission, Berna measures between 13.12 and 19.96 kilometers in diameter and its surface has an albedo between 0.13 and 0.25. The Collaborative Asteroid Lightcurve Link assumes an albedo of 0.21 – derived from 15 Eunomia, the parent body of the Eunomia family – and calculates a diameter of 13.88 kilometers based on an absolute magnitude of 11.6.
