= David Stanley Evans =

British astronomer

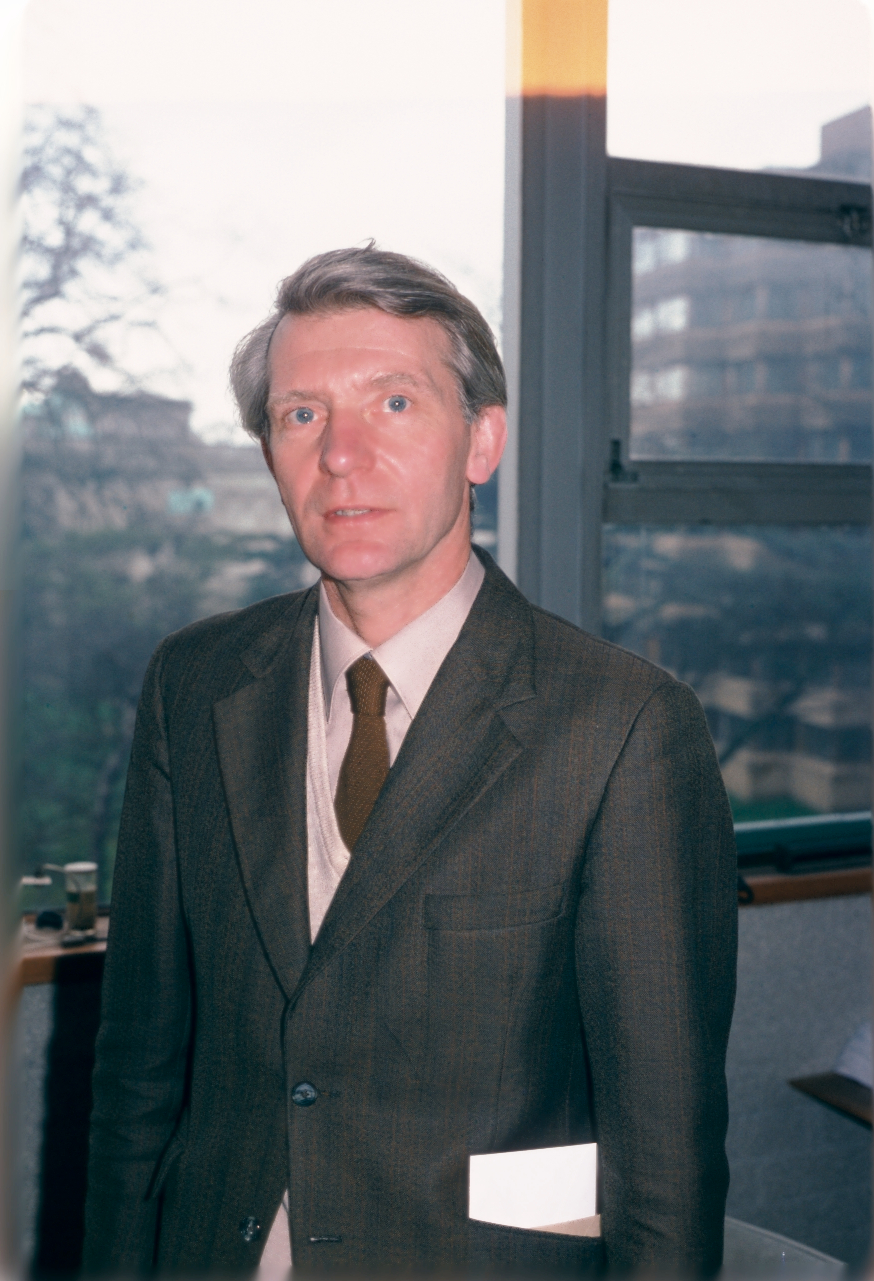
Stanley Evans, March 1981

David Stanley Evans (28 January 1916 – 14 November 2004) was a British astronomer, noted for his use of lunar occultations to measure stellar angular diameters during the 1950s.

== Early life and education ==
Evans was born in Cardiff, Wales on 28 January 1916. He was first educated at the Cardiff High School for Boys. He obtained a First Class in the Mathematics Tripos Part II in 1936 and a Distinction in Part III in 1937 from King's College, Cambridge and became a Ph.D. student at Cambridge Observatory in 1937, where he was a student of Sir Arthur Eddington. His Ph.D. degree was awarded in 1941 for a dissertation on “The Formation of the Balmer Series of Hydrogen in Stellar Atmospheres.” Being a conscientious objector to World War II he spent the war years at Oxford with physicist Kurt Mendelssohn where they worked on medical problems relating to the war effort. Over this period he was scientific editor of Discovery and editor of The Observatory.

== Career ==
=== South Africa ===
Evans left England in 1946 to work at the Radcliffe Observatory, Pretoria, South Africa when positional determinations and photometry were the main interests of the astronomical world, but when he left some twenty years later, the South African observatories had become active in astrophysics. Together with Harold Knox-Shaw he aluminised and installed the mirrors in the 74-inch (1.9 m) telescope. He determined the angular diameter of Antares and also wrongly came to the conclusion that Arcturus was elliptical in shape. This was later found to be an observational artifact, but the feasibility of measuring stellar diameters using lunar occultations, was soundly established. At this time Evans had become chief assistant at the Royal Observatory in Cape Town, South Africa. He designed and oversaw construction of a Newtonian spectrograph for the 74-inch (1.9 m) Radcliffe Telescope with which he measured the first southern galaxy redshifts. It was during this period that he wrote the popular guide book Teach Yourself Astronomy, in 1957.

=== Austin, Texas ===
He and his family visited Austin, Texas in 1965-66, when he was National Science Foundation Senior Visiting Scientist at The University of Texas and McDonald Observatory. This visit led to a permanent move to Austin in 1968, and he became professor of astronomy and associate director of McDonald Observatory. At McDonald Observatory R. E. Nather with Brian Warner developed a photometer able to measure extremely rapid changes in brightness. Their technique led Evans to look afresh at his occultation research and, for the next two decades he and his co-workers calculated the angular diameters of late-type stars. He also wrote "Herschel at the Cape,” and participated in measurements of the occultation of Beta Scorpii by Jupiter in 1972 and the apparent gravitational displacement of stars visually close to the Sun during a solar eclipse in 1973. The eclipse was observed from Mauritania and once again confirmed Albert Einstein’s predictions.

Evans and his fellow researchers studied late-type stars showing large starspots, and those subject to flares. They also turned their attention to double stars and multiple stars revealed by lunar occultation. Evans’ major contribution to astronomy was using the angular diameters of stars to calculate their surface brightness. This relation extended to stars which lay away from the ecliptic and could not be occulted by the Moon, as well as to Cepheid variables, yielding their distances. The relation between angular diameter and V-R colour index is termed the Barnes-Evans Relation, which is calibrated by using direct diameter observations of Cepheid variables. Using these relations the distance is calculated to delta Cephei, and compared with an independent distance derived from trigonometric parallax measurements by the Hubble Space Telescope - the two measurements agree to within a few percent.

Evans was appointed as Jack S. Josey Centennial Professor of Astronomy in 1984, a position he held until his retirement in 1986. He received the Gill Medal of the Astronomical Society of South Africa in 1988. He wrote eight books including an introduction to astronomy.

Evans died in Austin on 14 November 2004. At the time of his death, he had completed a book with Karen Winget on the eclipse expedition to Mauritania.

== Published works ==
- Herschel at the Cape. Diaries and correspondence of Sir John Herschel 1834-1838. Cape Town: AA Balkema. 1969. ISBN 0-292-78387-6. edited by Evans, D. S., Deeming, T. J., Evans, B. H. & Goldfarb, S.
- Astronomy (Teach Yourself) (2nd ed.). Hodder & Stoughton (published 1957). 1975. ISBN 0-340-15248-6.
- Lacaille: astronomer, traveller; with a new translation of his journal. Tucson: Pachart. 1992. ISBN 0-88126-284-6.
- The Eddington Enigma: A Personal Memoir. D.S. Evans. 1998. ISBN 978-0-7388-0131-5.
