= 1570 Brunonia =

Stony asteroid of the Koronis family

Discovery
- Discovered by: S. Arend
- Discovery site: Uccle Obs.
- Discovery date: 9 October 1948

Designations
- Named after: Brown University
- Alternative designations: 1948 TX · 1952 QE_{1}
- Minor planet category: main-belt · (outer); Koronis

Orbital characteristics
- Epoch 27 April 2019 (JD 2458600.5)
- Uncertainty parameter 0
- Observation arc: 69.89 yr (25,529 d)
- Aphelion: 3.0028 AU
- Perihelion: 2.6888 AU
- Semi-major axis: 2.8458 AU
- Eccentricity: 0.0552
- Orbital period (sidereal): 4.80 yr (1,754 d)
- Mean anomaly: 222.99°
- Mean motion: 0° 12^{m} 19.08^{s} / day
- Inclination: 1.6659°
- Longitude of ascending node: 190.05°
- Argument of perihelion: 226.15°

Physical characteristics
- Mean diameter: 10.80±1.03 km 12.118±0.272 km 12.728±0.058 km
- Synodic rotation period: 48 h (or longer)
- Geometric albedo: 0.166; 0.169±0.019; 0.1909; 0.209
- Spectral type: S (SDSS-MOC)
- Absolute magnitude (H): 11.90; 12.0; 12.40

1570 Brunonia, provisional designation 1948 TX, is a stony asteroid of the Koronis family from the outer regions of the asteroid belt, approximately 12 kilometers (7.5 miles) in diameter. It was discovered on 9 October 1948, by Belgian astronomer Sylvain Arend at the Royal Observatory of Belgium in Uccle. The S-type asteroid is likely elongated and has a longer-than-average rotation period of more than 48 hours. It was named for Brown University in Rhode Island, United States.

== Orbit and classification ==
Brunonia is a core member of the Koronis family (605), a very large outer asteroid family with nearly co-planar ecliptical orbits. It orbits the Sun in the outer main-belt at a distance of 2.7–3.0 AU once every 4 years and 10 months (1,754 days; semi-major axis of 2.85 AU). Its orbit has an eccentricity of 0.06 and an inclination of 2° with respect to the ecliptic. The body's observation arc begins at Uccle in November 1948, one month after its official discovery observation.

== Naming ==
This minor planet was named for Brown University in Providence, Rhode Island. The 7th oldest university in the United States, Brown was chartered in 1764. The official naming citation was published by the Minor Planet Center in February 1954 (M.P.C. 1040).

== Physical characteristics ==
In the SDSS-based taxonomy, Brunonia is a common, stony S-type asteroid, which agrees with the overall spectral type for members of the Koronis family.

=== Rotation period ===
In February 2016, a rotational lightcurve of Brunonia was obtained from photometric observations by the Kepler space telescope and its K2 mission (Uranus Field). Lightcurve analysis gave a rotation period of at least 48 hours with a brightness amplitude of more than 0.6 magnitude (U=n.a.), indicative of an elongated, non-spherical shape.

=== Diameter and albedo ===
According to the surveys carried out by the Japanese Akari satellite and the NEOWISE mission of NASA's Wide-field Infrared Survey Explorer, Brunonia measures between 10.8 and 12.7 kilometers in diameter and its surface has an albedo between 0.166 and 0.209. The Collaborative Asteroid Lightcurve Link assumes an albedo of 0.24 and a diameter of 10.8 kilometers based on an absolute magnitude of 12.0.
