= 1563 Noël =

Main-belt asteroid

Discovery
- Discovered by: S. Arend
- Discovery site: Uccle Obs.
- Discovery date: 7 March 1943

Designations
- Named after: Emanuel Arend (discoverer's son)
- Alternative designations: 1943 EG · 1930 EF
- Minor planet category: main-belt · Flora

Orbital characteristics
- Epoch 4 September 2017 (JD 2458000.5)
- Uncertainty parameter 0
- Observation arc: 87.06 yr (31,799 days)
- Aphelion: 2.3789 AU
- Perihelion: 2.0037 AU
- Semi-major axis: 2.1913 AU
- Eccentricity: 0.0856
- Orbital period (sidereal): 3.24 yr (1,185 days)
- Mean anomaly: 347.57°
- Mean motion: 0° 18^{m} 13.68^{s} / day
- Inclination: 5.9829°
- Longitude of ascending node: 53.649°
- Argument of perihelion: 116.41°

Physical characteristics
- Dimensions: 7.23±0.51 km 8.98 km (calculated)
- Synodic rotation period: 3.5483±0.0003 h (Note: Pravec (2008, 2011, 2013, 2015) web: rotation period of 3.5495±0.0001, 3.5483±0.0003, 3.5488±0.0001 and 3.5486±0.0002 hours with a brightness amplitude of 0.15 mag. Summary figures at Collaborative Asteroid Lightcurve Link (CALL) for (1563) Noel and Pravec, P.; Wolf, M.; Sarounova, L. (2011, 2013, 2015)); 3.5486±0.0002 h 3.5488±0.0001 h 3.5495±0.0001 h 3.550±0.002 h
- Geometric albedo: 0.24 (assumed); 0.370±0.051
- Spectral type: SMASS = Sa · S
- Absolute magnitude (H): 12.4

1563 Noël (provisional designation 1943 EG) is a stony Flora asteroid from the inner regions of the asteroid belt, approximately 8 kilometers in diameter. It was discovered on 7 March 1943, by Belgian astronomer Sylvain Arend at the Royal Observatory of Belgium in Uccle, and named after his son.

== Orbit and classification ==
Noël is a member of the Flora family, one of the largest groups of stony asteroids in the main-belt. It orbits the Sun at a distance of 2.0–2.4 AU once every 3 years and 3 months (1,185 days). Its orbit has an eccentricity of 0.09 and an inclination of 6° with respect to the ecliptic. Noël was first identified as 1930 EF at the Crimean Simeiz Observatory in 1930, extending its observation arc by 13 years prior to its official discovery observation.

== Physical characteristics ==
The S-type asteroid is characterized as a transitional Sa-subtype on the SMASS taxonomic scheme.

=== Rotation period ===
Between April 2008 and June 2015, five rotational lightcurves of Noël were obtained from photometric observations by Czech astronomer Petr Pravec at the Ondřejov Observatory near Prague. All lightcurves show a well-defined rotation period between 3.548 and 3.550 hours with a brightness variation of 0.15 to 0.18 in magnitude (U=3).

In April 2008, a photometric observation by astronomer Julian Oey at the Kingsgrove Observatory, Australia, gave a concurring period of 3.550±0.002 hours and an amplitude of 0.14 (U=3).

=== Diameter and albedo ===
According to the survey carried out by NASA's Wide-field Infrared Survey Explorer with its subsequent NEOWISE mission, Noël measures 7.2 kilometers in diameter and its surface has a high albedo of 0.37, while the Collaborative Asteroid Lightcurve Link assumes an albedo of 0.24 – derived from 8 Flora, the family's principal body and namesake – and calculates a larger diameter of 9.0 kilometers.

== Naming ==
This minor planet was named in honor of the discoverer's son, Emanuel Arend (H 138).
