= Banachiewicz (crater) =

Lunar impact crater

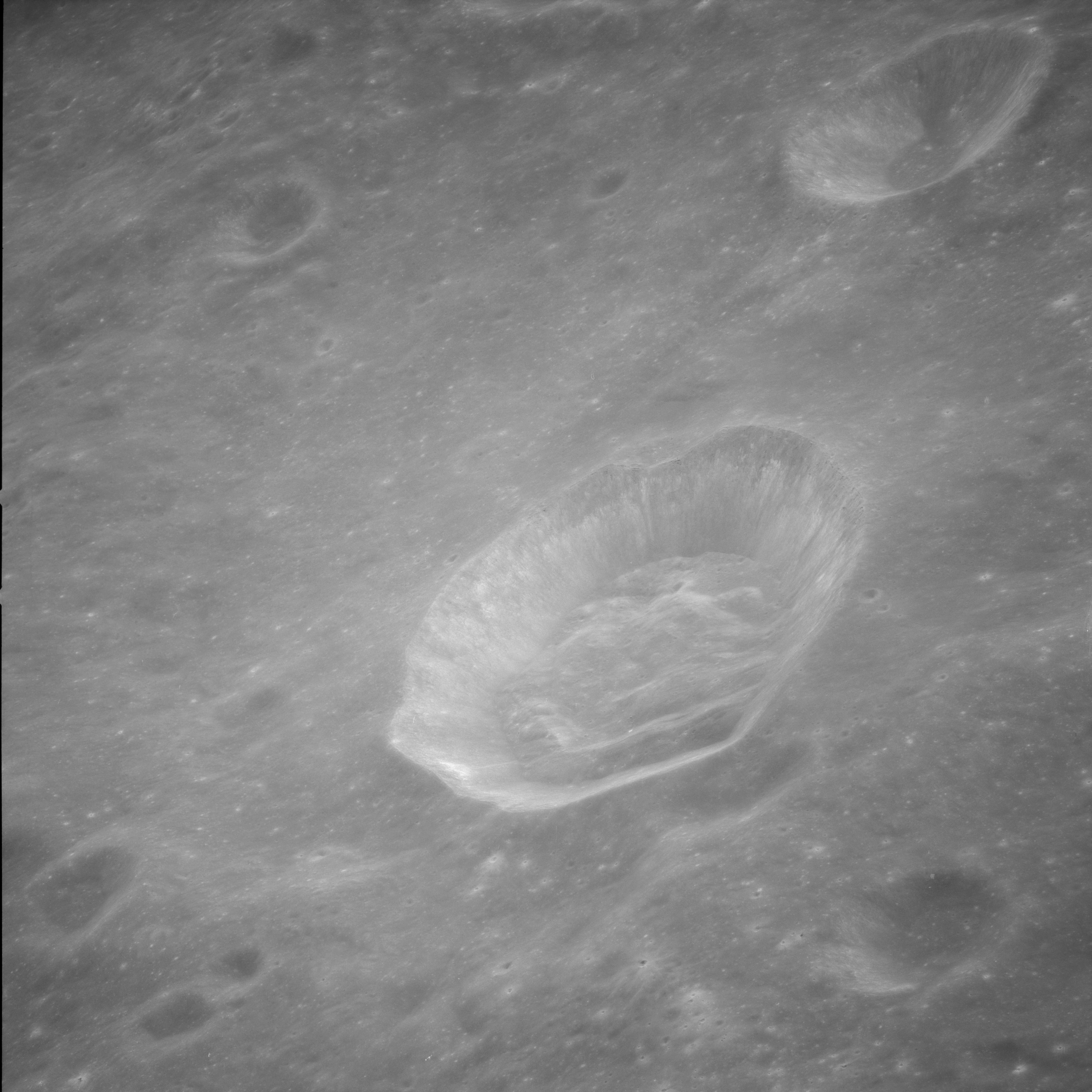
- Oblique Apollo 11 image of the interior of Banachiewicz. Banachiewicz B is the larger crater near center, and Knox-Shaw (Banachiewicz F), is in the upper right.
- Coordinates: 5.2°N 80.1°E
- Diameter: 99.09 km (61.57 mi)
- Depth: Unknown
- Colongitude: 281° at sunrise
- Eponym: Tadeusz Banachiewicz

Banachiewicz is the remains of a lunar impact crater that is located near the eastern limb of the Moon. Due to its location, Banachiewicz appears significantly foreshortened to an earthbound viewer. The visibility is more than partly affected by libration, which can at times completely conceal this formation from view. Just to the northeast of this formation is the large walled plain named Neper, which lies on the southern edge of Mare Marginis. The crater Schubert is located to the south of Banachiewicz, while Schubert E is attached to the exterior of the western rim.

== Description ==
Banachiewicz crater is a heavily degraded walled plain. Portions of the western and southwest rim still survive as low ridges in the surface, while the remainder is a jumble of irregular terrain with little definition. Two small craters lie across the northeast rim. This crater was named after Polish astronomer Tadeusz Banachiewicz (1882–1954). The name was introduced into lunar nomenclature by David W. G. Arthur and Ewen Whitaker with the Rectified Lunar Atlas (1963). Its designation was formally adopted by the International Astronomical Union (IAU) in 1964.

There are two small impact craters of note within the interior: Banachiewicz B is adjacent to the western rim, while the smaller Knox-Shaw lies closer to the midpoint on the eastern floor. The latter was previously named Banachiewicz F. It is a bowl-shaped formation 13.44 km (8.35 mi) in diameter. The rim is circular and the inner walls slope down to a small interior floor at the midpoint. It is not significantly eroded and has no other distinguishing features. This formation was named after British astronomer Harold Knox-Shaw (1885-1970) by the IAU in 1973.

== Satellite craters ==
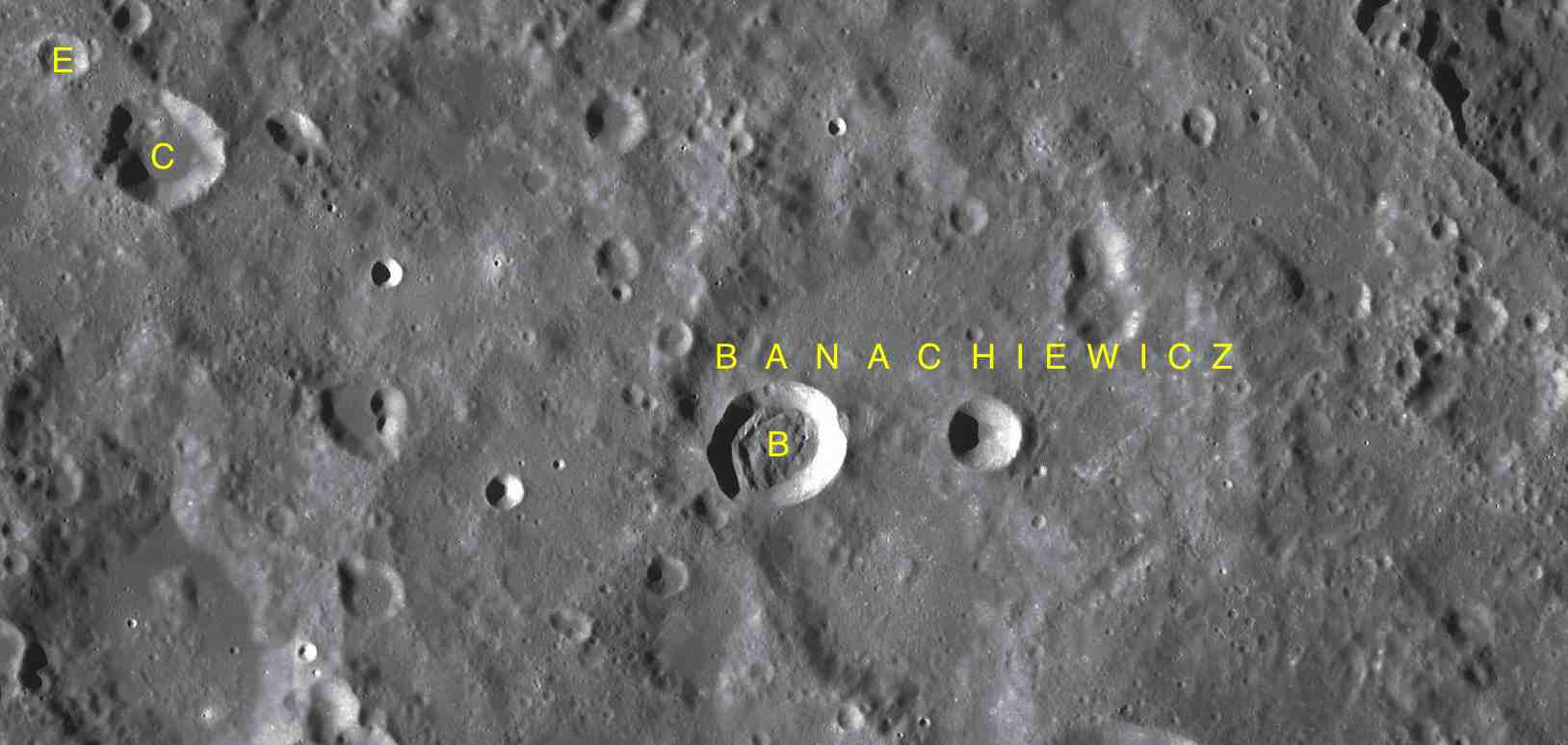
Satellite craters of Banachiewicz

By convention these features are identified on lunar maps by placing the letter on the side of the crater midpoint that is closest to Banachiewicz.

Banachiewicz	Latitude	Longitude	Diameter
B	5.3° N	78.9° E	24 km
C	7.0° N	75.4° E	19 km
E	7.5° N	74.7° E	7 km

== Gallery ==
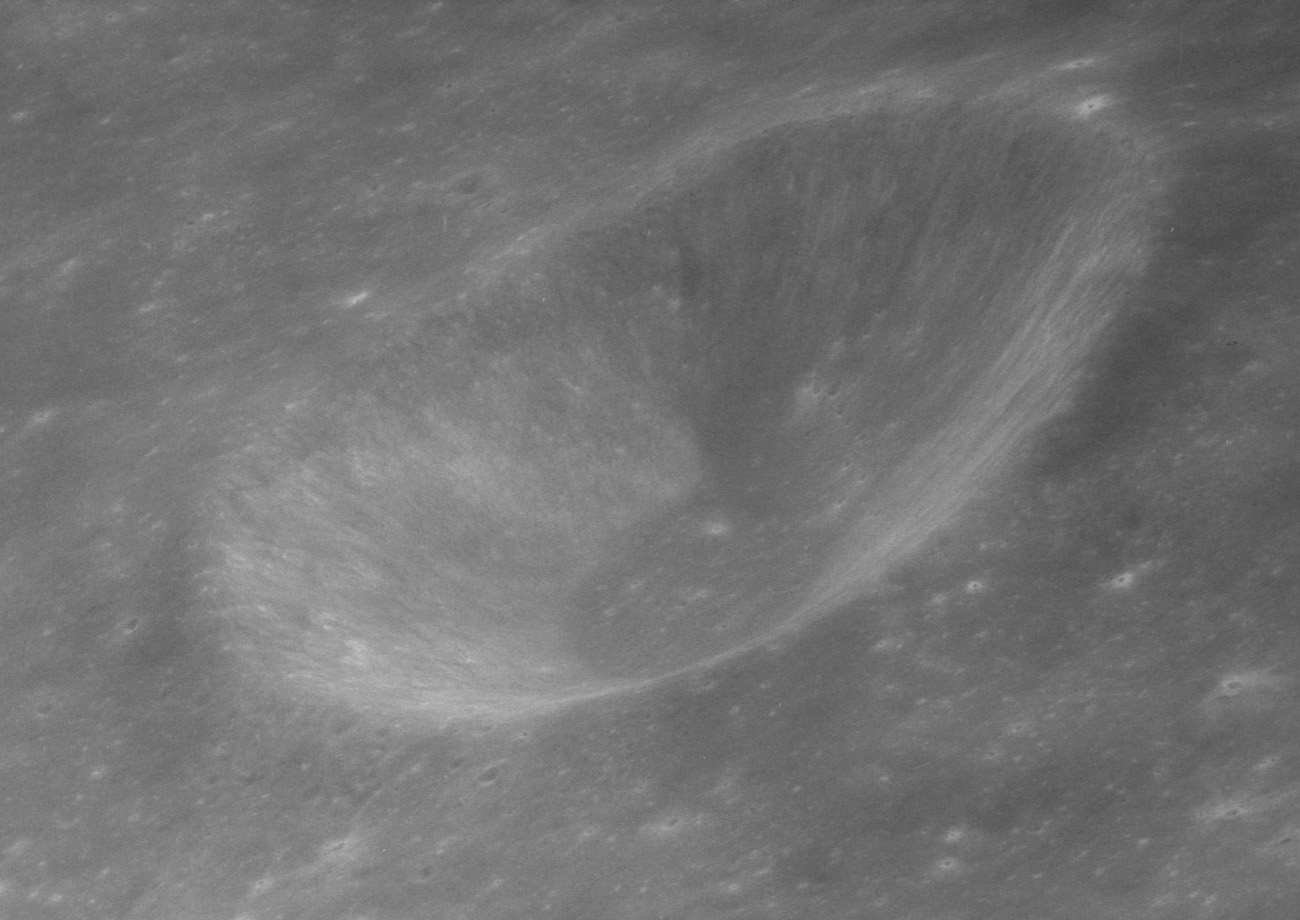
Oblique Apollo 11 image of Knox-Shaw (Banachiewicz F)

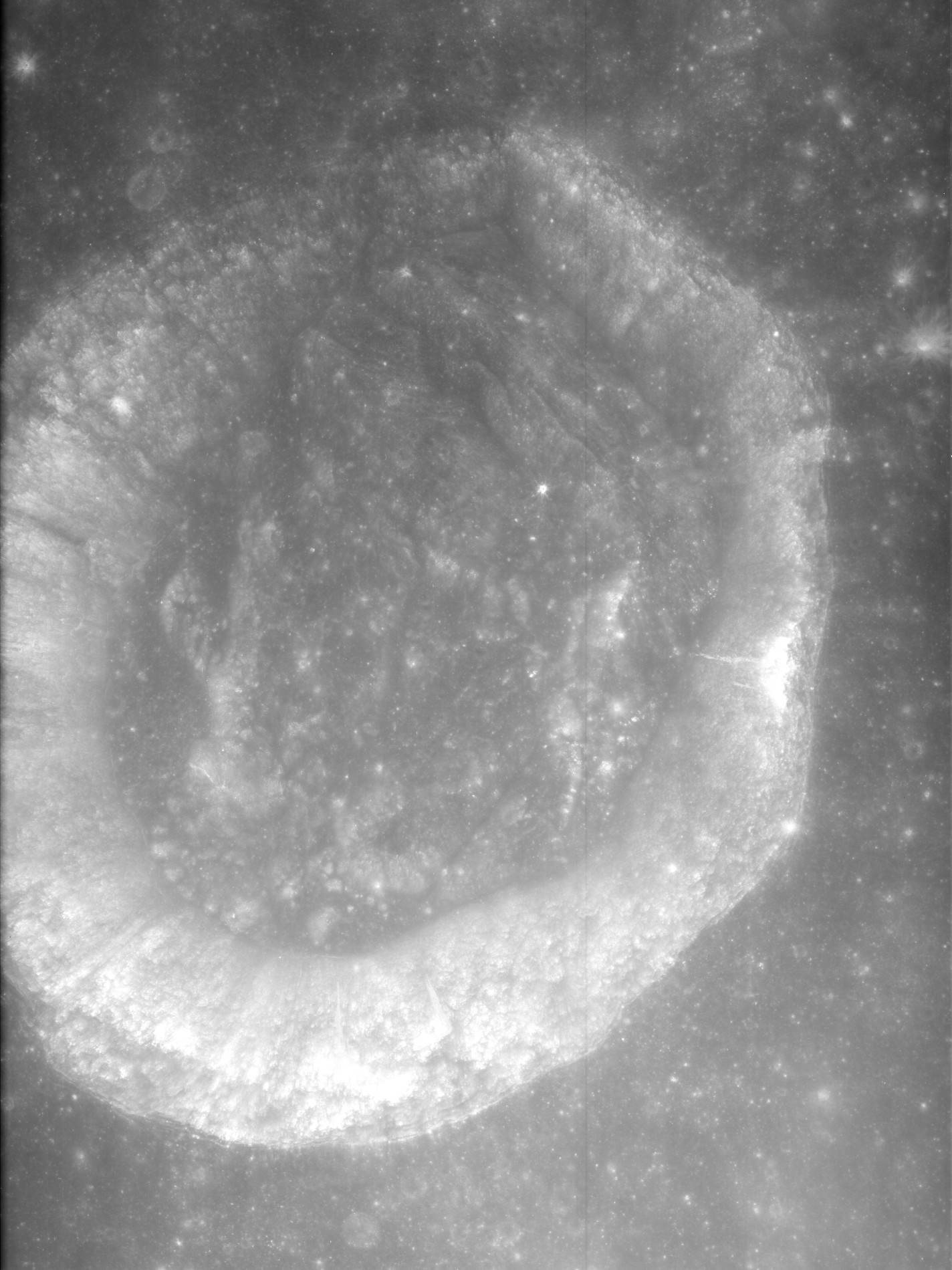
Banachiewicz B crater

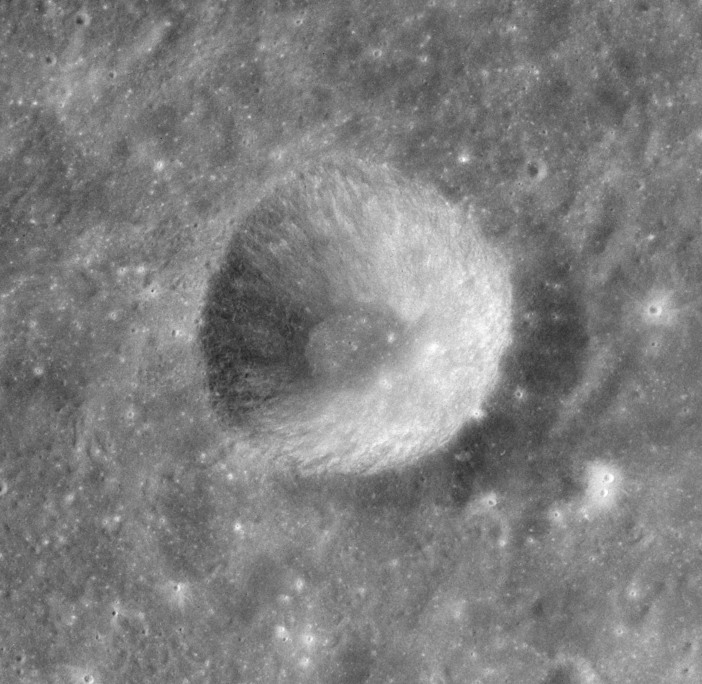
Apollo 16 image of Knox-Shaw

== See also ==
- 1286 Banachiewicza, asteroid
