= Tadeusz Banachiewicz =

Polish astronomer, mathematician and geodesist

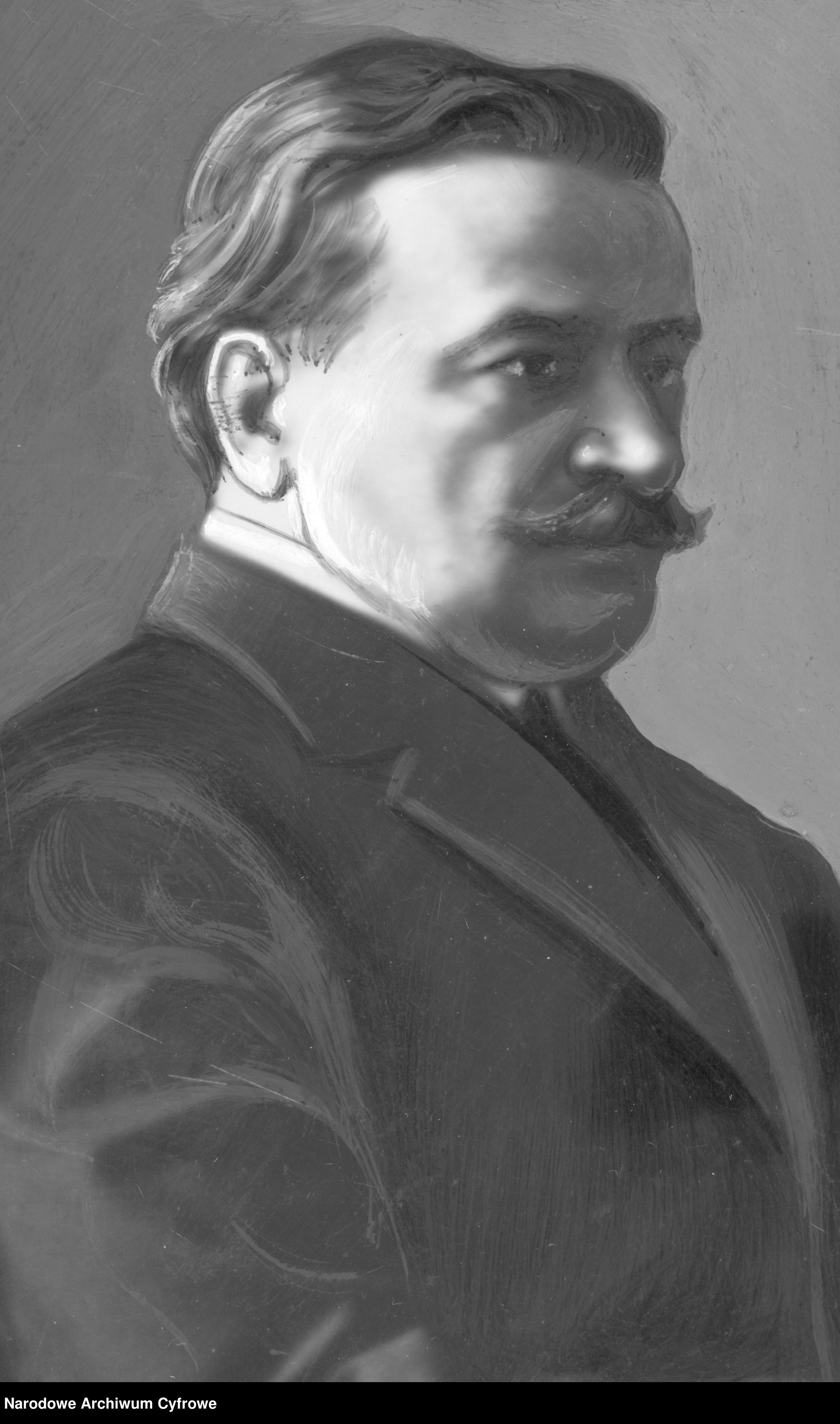
- Tadeusz Banachiewicz
- Born: 13 February 1882; Warsaw, Congress Poland, Russian Empire
- Died: 17 November 1954 (aged 72); Kraków, Poland
- Occupations: Astronomer, mathematician and geodesist
- Known for: cracovians LU decomposition chronocinematograph
- Spouse(s): Laura de Sołohub Dikyj (m. 1931)
- Parents: Artur Banachiewicz 1840–1910 (father); Zofia née Rzeszotarska 1852–1920 (mother)

Tadeusz Julian Banachiewicz (13 February 1882, Warsaw – 17 November 1954, Kraków) was a Polish astronomer, mathematician and geodesist.

== Scientific career ==
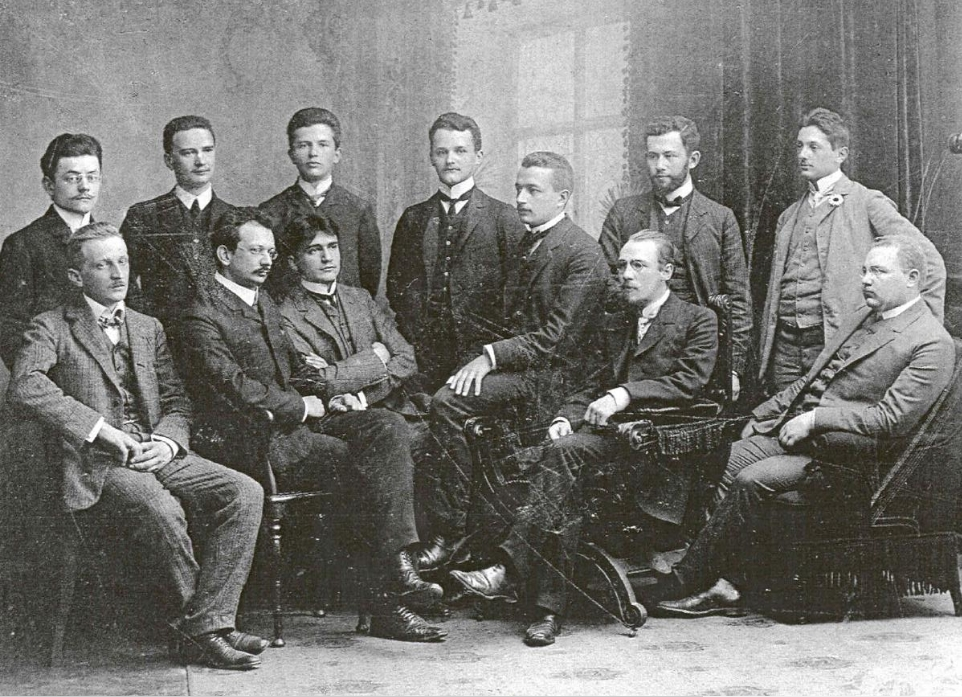
As a student in Gottingen, seated third from left

Banachiewicz was educated at University of Warsaw and his thesis was on "reduction constants of the Repsold heliometer". In 1905, after the closure of the University by the Russians, he moved to Göttingen and in 1906 to the Pulkovo Observatory. He also worked at the Engelhardt Observatory at Kazan University from 1910 to 1915.

In 1919, after Poland regained its independence, Banachiewicz moved to Kraków, becoming a professor at the Jagiellonian University and the director of Kraków Observatory (055). A major contribution was a modified method of determining parabolic orbits. In 1925, he invented a theory of "cracovians" – a special kind of matrix algebra – which brought him international recognition. This theory solved several astronomical, geodetic, mechanical and mathematical problems.

In 1922 he became a member of Polish Academy of Arts and Sciences and from 1932 to 1938 was the vice-president of the International Astronomical Union. He was also the first President of the Polish Astronomical Society, the vice-president of the Geodetic Committee of The Baltic States and, from 1952 to his death, a member of the Polish Academy of Sciences. He was also the founder of the journal Acta Astronomica. He was the recipient of Doctor Honoris Causa titles from the University of Warsaw (1929), the University of Poznań (1936) and the Sofia University in Bulgaria (1948).

Banachiewicz invented a chronocinematograph, an astronomical instrument for precise observations of solar eclipses. He published more than 500 scientific papers, scientific and popular press communications, telegraph scientific reports, polemics, reviews, reports and editorial works, dealing with astronomy, mathematics, mechanics, geodesy, geophysics and other fields of science. The LU decomposition was introduced by Banachiewicz in 1938.

== Honors ==
The lunar crater Banachiewicz and the main-belt asteroid 1286 Banachiewicza are named after him. The asteroid 1287 Lorcia was named after his wife following his suggestion to the discoverer.
