= Comet Arend–Roland =

Great Comet of 1957

C/1956 R1 (Arend–Roland) (Great Comet of 1957)
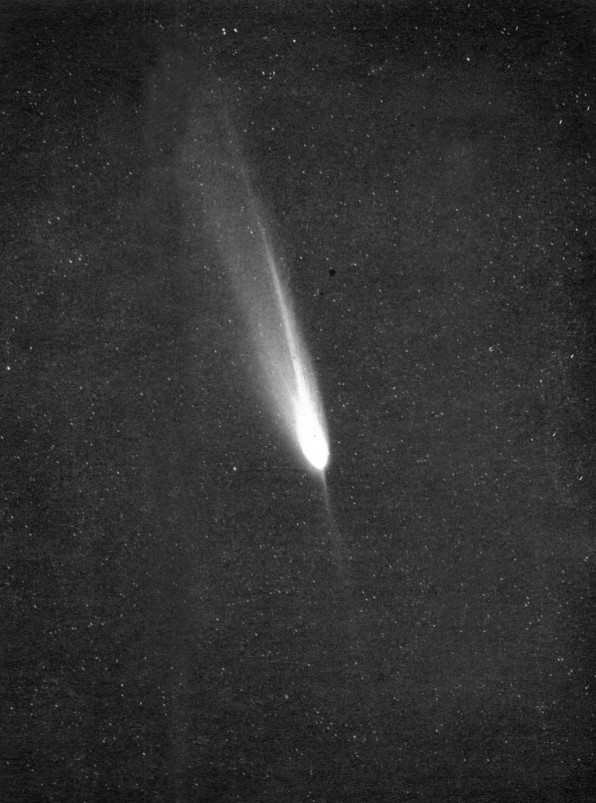
- Comet Arend-Roland photographed from the Palomar Observatory on 27 April 1957

Discovery
- Discovered by: Sylvain Arend; Georges Roland
- Discovery site: Uccle Obs, Belgium
- Discovery date: 6 November 1956

Designations
- Alternative designations: 1957h 1956 III

Orbital characteristics
- Epoch: 9 July 1957 (JD 2436028.5)
- Observation arc: 497 days (1.36 days)
- Number of observations: 57
- Orbit type: Oort cloud / Hyperbolic
- Perihelion: 0.31604 AU
- Eccentricity: 1.000199
- Inclination: 119.94°
- Longitude of ascending node: 215.86°
- Argument of periapsis: 308.77°
- Last perihelion: 8 April 1957
- Next perihelion: ejection
- Earth MOID: 0.239 AU
- Jupiter MOID: 1.610 AU

Physical characteristics
- Mean radius: 1.58 km (0.98 mi) (Note: Calculated mean radius using the formula: $\log_{10}\,(\,R\,)\ =\;0.9 +\;0.13 (\,H\,)$ Where $\,H\,$ is the comet's absolute total magnitude (M1))
- Comet total magnitude (M1): 5.4
- Apparent magnitude: –0.5 (1957 apparition)

Comet Arend–Roland was discovered on November 6, 1956, by Belgian astronomers Sylvain Arend and Georges Roland on photographic plates. As the eighth comet found in 1956, it was named Arend–Roland 1956h after its discoverers. Because it was the third comet to pass through perihelion during 1957, it was then renamed 1957 III. Finally, it received the standard IAU designation C/1956 R1 (Arend–Roland), with the "C/" indicating that it was a non-periodic comet and the "R1" showing that it was the first comet reported as discovered in the half-month designated by "R". The last is equivalent to the period September 1–15.

== Observations ==
In November 1956, a double astrograph at the Uccle Observatory in Brussels was being used for routine investigation of minor planets. On 6 November 1956, the Belgian astronomers Sylvain Arend and Georges Roland discovered a comet on their photographic plates. At that time the comet was at visual magnitude 10, with a strong central condensation and a short tail. The early discovery of this comet allowed observing programs and equipment to be prepared well in advance.

The orbital elements for this comet were computed by Michael Philip Candy, who predicted perihelion passage on 8 April 1957. As the comet was already well developed, he predicted that the object would present a prominent display during April in the northern hemisphere. In early December the comet was 2.5 AU from the Sun and 1.7 AU from the Earth. It was in the constellation Pisces until February, when it reached magnitude 7.5–8.

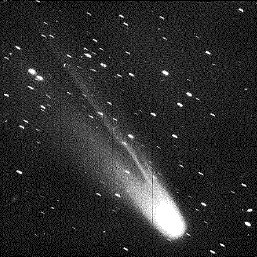
The comet on May 4.97, 1957

During the April perihelion passage, the tail of the comet reached a length of 15° of arc. The appearance of the tail varied, with streamers on April 16 and May 5, and the tail splitting into three beams on April 29. By April 22 the comet also displayed a prominent anomalous tail (or antitail) spanning 5°. This antitail stretched out to span 12° on April 25, reaching its maximal extent. The antitail had disappeared by 29 April.

Following perihelion on 8 April, the comet began to fade rapidly from its maximal brightness of magnitude −1. At the start of May it was measured at visual magnitude 5.46. By 8 May it had decreased to magnitude 7, well below the sensitivity limit of the unaided human eye. On 29 May it had dropped to magnitude 8.55.

This was the first comet for which attempts were made to detect it at various radio frequencies. However, these efforts were unsuccessful. No comets were successfully detected in the radio band until the 1973 passage of comet Kohoutek.

Comet Arend–Roland was the subject of the first edition of the BBC's long-running astronomy program The Sky at Night on 24 April 1957.

Astronomer Carl Sagan relates an anecdote on page 80 of his 1980 book Cosmos about being on duty in an observatory near Chicago in 1957 when a late-night phone call from an inebriated man asked what was the "fuzzy thing" they were seeing in the sky. Sagan told the man that it was a comet (Arend–Roland). The man asked what a comet was, and Sagan answered that it was "a snowball, one mile wide". After a long pause, the man said, quoting Sagan: "Lemme talk to a real 'shtronomer!".

== Properties ==
It was traveling on a hyperbolic orbit, that is, traveling fast enough to escape from the Solar System entirely, hence implying that it will never be seen again by earthbound observers. Observations of the comet over a period of 520 days allowed precise orbital elements to be computed. However, the distribution of the orbital elements showed a wavy pattern that suggested a non-gravitational influence. Alternatively, the comet may have originated from interstellar space rather than from the Oort cloud. When an orbital solution is computed that includes non-gravitational forces that vary as the inverse square of the heliocentric distance, somewhat different values are derived (see the Marsden (1970) column in the table below).

Orbital element	Sekanina (1968)	Marsden (1970)
Epoch of periastron (T)	1957 April 8.03232 ET	1957 April 8.03201 ET
Perihelion distance (q)	0.3160540 ± 0.0000008 AU	0.3160361 ± 0.0000024 AU
Inverse semi-major axis (1/a)	−0.0007886 ± 0.0000045 AU^{−1}	−0.0006377 ± 0.0000213 AU^{−1}
Eccentricity (e)	1.0002492 ± 0.0000014	1.0002015 ± 0.0000067
Inclination (i)	119.94936° ± 0.00005°	119.94930° ± 0.00006°
Longitude of periastron (ω)	307.78084° ± 0.00004°	308.77725° ± 0.00048°
Position angle of the ascending node (Ω)	215.15900° ± 0.00006°	215.15968° ± 0.00008°

At perihelion, the comet was emitting an estimated 7.5 × 10^{4} kg/s (83 tons/s) of dust and was releasing roughly 1.5 × 10^{30} gas molecules per second. It is believed that an outburst of dust occurred on April 2, six days before perihelion. The antitail was formed from particles released between February 6 and 1 March 1957. Estimates of the total amount of dust released into the zodiacal cloud range from 3 × 10^{8} to 5 × 10^{10} kg.
