= Harold Knox-Shaw =

English astronomer

Harold Knox Shaw
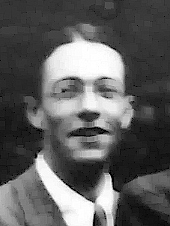
- Bonn, 1913
- Born: 12 October 1885; St Leonards-on-Sea, Sussex
- Died: 11 April 1970 (aged 84)
- Education: Trinity College, Cambridge
- Scientific career
- Fields: Astronomy
- Workplaces: Radcliffe Observatory

Harold Knox-Shaw (12 October 1885 – 11 April 1970) was an English astronomer.

He was born in St Leonards-on-Sea, Sussex. He was the oldest of four siblings. During his youth he earned scholarships to Wellington College in Berkshire and to Trinity College, Cambridge, from which he graduated in 1907 ranked as Sixth Wrangler. A year following his graduation he became an assistant at the Khedivial Astronomical Observatory in Helwan, Egypt. He was elected Fellow of the Society in 1908. In 1910 he became the first to photograph Halley's Comet from this site.

In 1913 he became superintendent of the Khedivial Observatory, and remained at that post until 1924. From 1918 until 1924 he also served as the Director of Meteorological Services in Egypt and Sudan. He performed welfare work for the British army during World War I, and was awarded the Order of the Nile, Class 4. (In 1926 he was awarded Order of the Nile, class 3.)

He returned to England in 1924 to become Radcliffe Observer at the Radcliffe Observatory. Much of his labor during the following years was then spent in production of the Radcliffe Catalogue of Proper Motions, published in 1934. From 1926–30 he was Secretary of the Royal Astronomical Society, then served as President 1931–32.

His dissatisfaction with the observing conditions in England led him to lobby funds for a site in South Africa. This observatory would not be completed until 1939, however, when Knox-Shaw took up residence. The pouring of the blank for the main telescope was then held up until after World War II. From 1941–42 he was president of the Astronomical Society of Southern Africa (ASSA). The mirror finally arrived in 1948, followed by a Cassegrain spectrograph in 1951. Two years later Knox-Shaw retired.

He married Maisie (née Weir of Pretoria) and the couple had one son, Peter, who was born in 1944. His twenty-year retirement was spent at Elgin, Western Cape. He died from a stroke, and his ashes were scattered on Radcliffe Observatory grounds.

== Awards and honors ==
- The crater Knox-Shaw on the Moon is named after him.
- Awarded the Order of the Nile, class 3 in 1926.
- First winner of the Gill Medal, Astronomical Society of Southern Africa, 1956.
