= Naef =

Naef, Naeff or Näf is a Swiss surname that may refer to

- Adolf Naef (1883–1949), Swiss zoologist and palaeontologist
- Adrian Naef (born 1948), Swiss writer and musician
- Céline Naef (born 2005), Swiss tennis player
- Ernest Näf (1920–20??), Swiss racing cyclist
- Fritz Naef (1934–2014), Swiss ice hockey player
- Ralph Näf (born 1980), Swiss cross-country mountain biker
- Robert Adolf Naef (1907–1975), Swiss banker and astronomer
  - 1906 Naef, a stony asteroid named after Robert
  - Observatory Naef Épendes, an astronomical observatory at Épendes, Switzerland, named after Robert
- Roslï Näf (1911–1996), Swiss nurse
- Wilhelm Matthias Naeff (1802–1881), Swiss politician
