= List of minor planets: 405001–406000 =

The following is a partial list of minor planets, running from minor-planet number 405001 through 406000, inclusive. The primary data for this and other partial lists is based on JPL's "Small-Body Orbital Elements" and data available from the Minor Planet Center. Critical list information is also provided by the MPC, unless otherwise specified from Lowell Observatory. A detailed description of the table's columns and additional sources are given on the main page including a complete list of every page in this series, and a statistical break-up on the dynamical classification of minor planets.

Also see the summary list of all named bodies in numerical and alphabetical order, and the corresponding naming citations for the number range of this particular list. New namings may only be added to this list after official publication, as the preannouncement of names is condemned by the Working Group for Small Bodies Nomenclature of the International Astronomical Union.

Near-Earth obj.	MBA (inner)	MBA (outer)	Centaur
Mars-crosser	MBA (middle)	Jupiter trojan	Trans-Neptunian obj.
Unclassified

== 405001–405100 ==
Designation			Discovery			Properties		Ref
Permanent	Provisional	Named after	Date	Site	Discoverer(s)	Category	Diam.	Ref
405001	2000 SY_{334}	—	September 26, 2000	Haleakala	NEAT	·	770 m	MPC · JPL
405002	2000 SR_{365}	—	September 21, 2000	Anderson Mesa	LONEOS	·	770 m	MPC · JPL
405003	2000 TX_{25}	—	October 1, 2000	Socorro	LINEAR	GEF	1.3 km	MPC · JPL
405004	2000 TU_{48}	—	October 1, 2000	Socorro	LINEAR	PHO	1.4 km	MPC · JPL
405005	2000 UJ_{18}	—	October 24, 2000	Socorro	LINEAR	·	3.1 km	MPC · JPL
405006	2000 UH_{70}	—	October 25, 2000	Socorro	LINEAR	·	1.1 km	MPC · JPL
405007	2000 VJ_{19}	—	November 1, 2000	Socorro	LINEAR	·	640 m	MPC · JPL
405008	2000 VT_{41}	—	November 1, 2000	Socorro	LINEAR	ERI	1.7 km	MPC · JPL
405009	2000 VO_{53}	—	November 3, 2000	Socorro	LINEAR	·	980 m	MPC · JPL
405010	2000 WL_{13}	—	November 21, 2000	Socorro	LINEAR	PHO	1.2 km	MPC · JPL
405011	2000 WT_{80}	—	November 20, 2000	Socorro	LINEAR	DOR	2.3 km	MPC · JPL
405012	2000 WP_{170}	—	November 24, 2000	Anderson Mesa	LONEOS	·	1.1 km	MPC · JPL
405013	2000 YK_{94}	—	December 20, 2000	Kitt Peak	Spacewatch	·	1.5 km	MPC · JPL
405014	2001 CZ_{28}	—	February 2, 2001	Anderson Mesa	LONEOS	EUP	4.6 km	MPC · JPL
405015	2001 DW_{23}	—	February 17, 2001	Socorro	LINEAR	·	3.4 km	MPC · JPL
405016	2001 DD_{55}	—	February 16, 2001	Kitt Peak	Spacewatch	·	2.0 km	MPC · JPL
405017	2001 HE_{17}	—	April 24, 2001	Kitt Peak	Spacewatch	·	1.1 km	MPC · JPL
405018	2001 PY_{4}	—	August 7, 2001	Haleakala	NEAT	·	1.7 km	MPC · JPL
405019	2001 PY_{64}	—	August 1, 2001	Palomar	NEAT	·	550 m	MPC · JPL
405020	2001 QX	—	August 16, 2001	Socorro	LINEAR	·	550 m	MPC · JPL
405021	2001 QN_{48}	—	August 16, 2001	Socorro	LINEAR	·	1.7 km	MPC · JPL
405022	2001 QX_{128}	—	August 20, 2001	Socorro	LINEAR	·	1.5 km	MPC · JPL
405023	2001 QO_{130}	—	August 20, 2001	Socorro	LINEAR	ADE	2.6 km	MPC · JPL
405024	2001 QK_{189}	—	August 22, 2001	Socorro	LINEAR	·	1.2 km	MPC · JPL
405025	2001 QM_{190}	—	August 22, 2001	Socorro	LINEAR	·	2.6 km	MPC · JPL
405026	2001 QU_{207}	—	August 23, 2001	Anderson Mesa	LONEOS	·	710 m	MPC · JPL
405027	2001 QZ_{251}	—	July 27, 2001	Anderson Mesa	LONEOS	·	1.6 km	MPC · JPL
405028	2001 QC_{257}	—	August 25, 2001	Socorro	LINEAR	·	1.7 km	MPC · JPL
405029	2001 QH_{288}	—	August 17, 2001	Palomar	NEAT	·	680 m	MPC · JPL
405030	2001 RD_{9}	—	September 8, 2001	Socorro	LINEAR	·	3.3 km	MPC · JPL
405031	2001 RO_{36}	—	September 8, 2001	Socorro	LINEAR	·	530 m	MPC · JPL
405032	2001 RO_{39}	—	September 10, 2001	Socorro	LINEAR	JUN	820 m	MPC · JPL
405033	2001 RD_{98}	—	September 12, 2001	Kitt Peak	Spacewatch	·	2.2 km	MPC · JPL
405034	2001 RW_{111}	—	September 12, 2001	Socorro	LINEAR	EUN	1.3 km	MPC · JPL
405035	2001 RO_{113}	—	September 12, 2001	Socorro	LINEAR	(5)	2.2 km	MPC · JPL
405036	2001 RT_{119}	—	September 12, 2001	Socorro	LINEAR	·	680 m	MPC · JPL
405037	2001 SQ_{24}	—	September 16, 2001	Socorro	LINEAR	H	610 m	MPC · JPL
405038	2001 SS_{48}	—	September 16, 2001	Socorro	LINEAR	H	570 m	MPC · JPL
405039	2001 SJ_{60}	—	September 17, 2001	Socorro	LINEAR	·	2.6 km	MPC · JPL
405040	2001 SC_{85}	—	September 11, 2001	Anderson Mesa	LONEOS	·	1.8 km	MPC · JPL
405041	2001 SO_{89}	—	September 20, 2001	Socorro	LINEAR	·	480 m	MPC · JPL
405042	2001 SY_{102}	—	September 20, 2001	Socorro	LINEAR	·	1.4 km	MPC · JPL
405043	2001 SM_{116}	—	September 21, 2001	Socorro	LINEAR	H	570 m	MPC · JPL
405044	2001 SB_{127}	—	September 16, 2001	Socorro	LINEAR	·	690 m	MPC · JPL
405045	2001 SM_{129}	—	September 16, 2001	Socorro	LINEAR	·	2.0 km	MPC · JPL
405046	2001 SR_{166}	—	September 11, 2001	Anderson Mesa	LONEOS	·	1.5 km	MPC · JPL
405047	2001 SL_{185}	—	September 19, 2001	Socorro	LINEAR	EUN	1.2 km	MPC · JPL
405048	2001 SP_{191}	—	September 19, 2001	Socorro	LINEAR	·	2.2 km	MPC · JPL
405049	2001 SK_{193}	—	August 26, 2001	Kitt Peak	Spacewatch	·	1.7 km	MPC · JPL
405050	2001 SM_{198}	—	September 19, 2001	Socorro	LINEAR	·	1.4 km	MPC · JPL
405051	2001 SL_{199}	—	September 12, 2001	Socorro	LINEAR	·	1.8 km	MPC · JPL
405052	2001 SR_{215}	—	September 19, 2001	Socorro	LINEAR	·	1.7 km	MPC · JPL
405053	2001 SQ_{225}	—	September 19, 2001	Socorro	LINEAR	·	620 m	MPC · JPL
405054	2001 SJ_{255}	—	September 19, 2001	Socorro	LINEAR	·	700 m	MPC · JPL
405055	2001 SN_{259}	—	September 20, 2001	Socorro	LINEAR	·	1.4 km	MPC · JPL
405056	2001 SN_{287}	—	September 21, 2001	Palomar	NEAT	H	550 m	MPC · JPL
405057	2001 SO_{352}	—	September 24, 2001	Palomar	NEAT	EUN	1.2 km	MPC · JPL
405058	2001 TX_{16}	—	October 13, 2001	Socorro	LINEAR	T_{j} (2.77) · CYB	5.6 km	MPC · JPL
405059	2001 TO_{17}	—	October 14, 2001	Ondřejov	P. Pravec	·	2.0 km	MPC · JPL
405060	2001 TT_{18}	—	October 11, 2001	Eskridge	G. Hug	H	440 m	MPC · JPL
405061	2001 TC_{30}	—	September 20, 2001	Socorro	LINEAR	·	1.7 km	MPC · JPL
405062	2001 TN_{52}	—	October 13, 2001	Socorro	LINEAR	·	1.7 km	MPC · JPL
405063	2001 TL_{86}	—	October 14, 2001	Socorro	LINEAR	·	1.7 km	MPC · JPL
405064	2001 TV_{153}	—	October 13, 2001	Palomar	NEAT	·	930 m	MPC · JPL
405065	2001 TA_{162}	—	September 23, 2001	Kitt Peak	Spacewatch	·	1.7 km	MPC · JPL
405066	2001 TS_{182}	—	October 14, 2001	Socorro	LINEAR	·	1.7 km	MPC · JPL
405067	2001 TM_{183}	—	October 14, 2001	Socorro	LINEAR	·	660 m	MPC · JPL
405068	2001 TH_{225}	—	September 17, 2001	Anderson Mesa	LONEOS	JUN	1.3 km	MPC · JPL
405069	2001 TG_{231}	—	October 15, 2001	Palomar	NEAT	·	700 m	MPC · JPL
405070	2001 TN_{257}	—	October 10, 2001	Palomar	NEAT	·	2.0 km	MPC · JPL
405071	2001 TT_{258}	—	October 14, 2001	Apache Point	SDSS	·	1.4 km	MPC · JPL
405072	2001 UT_{8}	—	September 20, 2001	Socorro	LINEAR	·	680 m	MPC · JPL
405073	2001 UL_{43}	—	October 17, 2001	Socorro	LINEAR	·	1.7 km	MPC · JPL
405074	2001 UU_{58}	—	October 15, 2001	Kitt Peak	Spacewatch	EUN	1.1 km	MPC · JPL
405075	2001 UU_{62}	—	September 20, 2001	Socorro	LINEAR	EUN	1.1 km	MPC · JPL
405076	2001 UP_{72}	—	October 20, 2001	Haleakala	NEAT	·	2.0 km	MPC · JPL
405077	2001 US_{77}	—	October 17, 2001	Socorro	LINEAR	·	1.6 km	MPC · JPL
405078	2001 UK_{85}	—	October 16, 2001	Kitt Peak	Spacewatch	·	1.2 km	MPC · JPL
405079	2001 UB_{105}	—	October 20, 2001	Socorro	LINEAR	·	1.6 km	MPC · JPL
405080	2001 UL_{142}	—	October 23, 2001	Socorro	LINEAR	·	650 m	MPC · JPL
405081	2001 UH_{172}	—	October 18, 2001	Palomar	NEAT	·	1.6 km	MPC · JPL
405082	2001 UO_{204}	—	October 14, 2001	Socorro	LINEAR	·	1.7 km	MPC · JPL
405083	2001 UG_{209}	—	October 20, 2001	Socorro	LINEAR	·	1.8 km	MPC · JPL
405084	2001 UG_{218}	—	October 26, 2001	Kitt Peak	Spacewatch	·	1.6 km	MPC · JPL
405085	2001 UQ_{231}	—	September 11, 2001	Kitt Peak	Spacewatch	·	1.5 km	MPC · JPL
405086	2001 VS_{74}	—	November 14, 2001	Kitt Peak	Spacewatch	WIT	1.0 km	MPC · JPL
405087	2001 WC_{20}	—	October 23, 2001	Socorro	LINEAR	·	1.9 km	MPC · JPL
405088	2001 WN_{32}	—	November 17, 2001	Socorro	LINEAR	·	710 m	MPC · JPL
405089	2001 WD_{72}	—	November 9, 2001	Socorro	LINEAR	·	860 m	MPC · JPL
405090	2001 XK_{32}	—	December 7, 2001	Kitt Peak	Spacewatch	·	1.5 km	MPC · JPL
405091	2001 XT_{32}	—	October 21, 2001	Socorro	LINEAR	·	1.5 km	MPC · JPL
405092	2001 XM_{46}	—	December 9, 2001	Socorro	LINEAR	·	1.8 km	MPC · JPL
405093	2001 XW_{88}	—	December 9, 2001	Socorro	LINEAR	·	1.9 km	MPC · JPL
405094	2001 XE_{91}	—	November 12, 2001	Socorro	LINEAR	·	2.5 km	MPC · JPL
405095	2001 XL_{141}	—	November 20, 2001	Socorro	LINEAR	·	1.9 km	MPC · JPL
405096	2001 XF_{174}	—	December 14, 2001	Socorro	LINEAR	·	1.8 km	MPC · JPL
405097	2001 XY_{198}	—	December 14, 2001	Socorro	LINEAR	·	2.7 km	MPC · JPL
405098	2001 XG_{217}	—	December 14, 2001	Socorro	LINEAR	·	1.9 km	MPC · JPL
405099	2001 XY_{234}	—	November 20, 2001	Socorro	LINEAR	GAL	1.7 km	MPC · JPL
405100	2001 YZ_{8}	—	December 17, 2001	Socorro	LINEAR	·	1.6 km	MPC · JPL

== 405101–405200 ==
back to top

Designation			Discovery			Properties		Ref
Permanent	Provisional	Named after	Date	Site	Discoverer(s)	Category	Diam.	Ref
405101	2001 YQ_{14}	—	December 7, 2001	Kitt Peak	Spacewatch	HOF	3.0 km	MPC · JPL
405102	2002 AZ_{43}	—	January 6, 2002	Kitt Peak	Spacewatch	AEO	1.3 km	MPC · JPL
405103	2002 AH_{55}	—	December 24, 2001	Kitt Peak	Spacewatch	·	900 m	MPC · JPL
405104	2002 AN_{68}	—	January 12, 2002	Kitt Peak	Spacewatch	·	660 m	MPC · JPL
405105	2002 BJ_{26}	—	November 27, 2001	Socorro	LINEAR	·	710 m	MPC · JPL
405106	2002 CE_{60}	—	February 6, 2002	Socorro	LINEAR	·	870 m	MPC · JPL
405107	2002 CY_{70}	—	February 7, 2002	Socorro	LINEAR	·	710 m	MPC · JPL
405108	2002 CF_{98}	—	February 7, 2002	Socorro	LINEAR	PHO	1.1 km	MPC · JPL
405109	2002 CB_{246}	—	February 13, 2002	Kitt Peak	Spacewatch	V	510 m	MPC · JPL
405110	2002 CL_{252}	—	February 4, 2002	Anderson Mesa	LONEOS	·	2.3 km	MPC · JPL
405111	2002 CG_{260}	—	February 7, 2002	Palomar	NEAT	·	690 m	MPC · JPL
405112	2002 DK_{19}	—	February 17, 2002	Palomar	NEAT	H	610 m	MPC · JPL
405113	2002 ED_{4}	—	March 10, 2002	Cima Ekar	ADAS	·	950 m	MPC · JPL
405114	2002 EE_{82}	—	March 13, 2002	Palomar	NEAT	·	1.9 km	MPC · JPL
405115	2002 EO_{162}	—	March 4, 2002	Kitt Peak	Spacewatch	·	1.2 km	MPC · JPL
405116	2002 FQ_{15}	—	March 16, 2002	Haleakala	NEAT	·	1.1 km	MPC · JPL
405117	2002 FG_{22}	—	March 19, 2002	Socorro	LINEAR	PHO	980 m	MPC · JPL
405118	2002 FN_{30}	—	March 20, 2002	Socorro	LINEAR	H	680 m	MPC · JPL
405119	2002 FW_{33}	—	March 20, 2002	Socorro	LINEAR	·	1.9 km	MPC · JPL
405120	2002 FS_{41}	—	March 21, 2002	Kitt Peak	Spacewatch	·	2.3 km	MPC · JPL
405121	2002 GF_{2}	—	April 6, 2002	Emerald Lane	L. Ball	PHO	1.2 km	MPC · JPL
405122	2002 GO_{2}	—	April 4, 2002	Palomar	NEAT	·	1.2 km	MPC · JPL
405123	2002 GB_{5}	—	April 9, 2002	Terskol	Terskol	·	2.4 km	MPC · JPL
405124	2002 GS_{51}	—	April 5, 2002	Palomar	NEAT	TIR	2.8 km	MPC · JPL
405125	2002 GM_{112}	—	April 10, 2002	Socorro	LINEAR	·	1.4 km	MPC · JPL
405126	2002 GU_{121}	—	April 10, 2002	Socorro	LINEAR	·	2.7 km	MPC · JPL
405127	2002 GB_{135}	—	April 12, 2002	Socorro	LINEAR	·	1 km	MPC · JPL
405128	2002 GU_{162}	—	April 14, 2002	Palomar	NEAT	·	3.4 km	MPC · JPL
405129	2002 HW_{8}	—	April 19, 2002	Kitt Peak	Spacewatch	·	490 m	MPC · JPL
405130	2002 JO_{9}	—	May 7, 2002	Kitt Peak	Spacewatch	·	1.2 km	MPC · JPL
405131	2002 JV_{17}	—	May 7, 2002	Palomar	NEAT	·	3.1 km	MPC · JPL
405132	2002 JH_{36}	—	May 9, 2002	Socorro	LINEAR	·	2.7 km	MPC · JPL
405133	2002 LB_{15}	—	June 6, 2002	Socorro	LINEAR	·	6.3 km	MPC · JPL
405134	2002 PU_{110}	—	August 13, 2002	Anderson Mesa	LONEOS	THB	2.9 km	MPC · JPL
405135	2002 PJ_{177}	—	August 11, 2002	Palomar	NEAT	·	4.5 km	MPC · JPL
405136	2002 PK_{180}	—	August 8, 2002	Palomar	NEAT	·	2.6 km	MPC · JPL
405137	2002 PE_{202}	—	March 4, 2013	Haleakala	Pan-STARRS 1	·	1.2 km	MPC · JPL
405138	2002 QC_{3}	—	August 16, 2002	Palomar	NEAT	·	1.1 km	MPC · JPL
405139	2002 QE_{34}	—	August 29, 2002	Palomar	NEAT	·	5.0 km	MPC · JPL
405140	2002 QR_{121}	—	August 16, 2002	Palomar	NEAT	·	3.2 km	MPC · JPL
405141	2002 QP_{138}	—	August 17, 2002	Palomar	NEAT	·	1.2 km	MPC · JPL
405142	2002 RF_{179}	—	September 14, 2002	Kitt Peak	Spacewatch	(5)	770 m	MPC · JPL
405143	2002 RZ_{182}	—	September 11, 2002	Palomar	NEAT	·	1.4 km	MPC · JPL
405144	2002 RD_{218}	—	October 12, 1998	Kitt Peak	Spacewatch	EUN	1.2 km	MPC · JPL
405145	2002 RS_{245}	—	September 1, 2002	Palomar	NEAT	(5)	1.1 km	MPC · JPL
405146	2002 RJ_{255}	—	September 15, 2002	Palomar	NEAT	·	960 m	MPC · JPL
405147	2002 RD_{266}	—	September 13, 2002	Palomar	NEAT	·	690 m	MPC · JPL
405148	2002 RN_{288}	—	April 27, 2001	Kitt Peak	Spacewatch	·	880 m	MPC · JPL
405149	2002 SE_{12}	—	September 27, 2002	Palomar	NEAT	·	1.3 km	MPC · JPL
405150	2002 ST_{48}	—	September 30, 2002	Socorro	LINEAR	·	930 m	MPC · JPL
405151	2002 SH_{64}	—	September 16, 2002	Palomar	NEAT	·	2.0 km	MPC · JPL
405152	2002 TM	—	October 1, 2002	Anderson Mesa	LONEOS	·	990 m	MPC · JPL
405153	2002 TH_{64}	—	October 3, 2002	Campo Imperatore	CINEOS	·	1.8 km	MPC · JPL
405154	2002 TN_{64}	—	October 5, 2002	Fountain Hills	C. W. Juels, P. R. Holvorcem	·	810 m	MPC · JPL
405155	2002 TY_{97}	—	October 3, 2002	Palomar	NEAT	·	1.5 km	MPC · JPL
405156	2002 TW_{149}	—	October 5, 2002	Palomar	NEAT	·	1.4 km	MPC · JPL
405157	2002 TW_{209}	—	October 6, 2002	Haleakala	NEAT	·	2.1 km	MPC · JPL
405158	2002 TS_{244}	—	October 10, 2002	Palomar	NEAT	·	850 m	MPC · JPL
405159	2002 TS_{312}	—	October 4, 2002	Apache Point	SDSS	·	940 m	MPC · JPL
405160	2002 TX_{333}	—	October 5, 2002	Apache Point	SDSS	·	1.4 km	MPC · JPL
405161	2002 TX_{348}	—	October 5, 2002	Apache Point	SDSS	MAR	980 m	MPC · JPL
405162	2002 TG_{367}	—	October 15, 2002	Palomar	NEAT	·	1.1 km	MPC · JPL
405163	2002 UD_{32}	—	October 30, 2002	Haleakala	NEAT	·	1.1 km	MPC · JPL
405164	2002 UY_{32}	—	October 31, 2002	Anderson Mesa	LONEOS	·	900 m	MPC · JPL
405165	2002 UG_{37}	—	October 31, 2002	Anderson Mesa	LONEOS	·	1.2 km	MPC · JPL
405166	2002 UO_{71}	—	March 4, 2000	Socorro	LINEAR	MAR	1.5 km	MPC · JPL
405167	2002 VF_{13}	—	November 4, 2002	Palomar	NEAT	·	1.0 km	MPC · JPL
405168	2002 VL_{46}	—	November 5, 2002	Palomar	NEAT	·	1.4 km	MPC · JPL
405169	2002 VO_{56}	—	November 6, 2002	Anderson Mesa	LONEOS	(5)	900 m	MPC · JPL
405170	2002 VK_{64}	—	November 6, 2002	Haleakala	NEAT	·	1.0 km	MPC · JPL
405171	2002 VN_{102}	—	October 5, 2002	Socorro	LINEAR	·	1.7 km	MPC · JPL
405172	2002 VE_{105}	—	November 12, 2002	Socorro	LINEAR	·	1.1 km	MPC · JPL
405173	2002 VM_{106}	—	November 12, 2002	Socorro	LINEAR	·	1.4 km	MPC · JPL
405174	2002 VR_{106}	—	November 12, 2002	Socorro	LINEAR	·	1.4 km	MPC · JPL
405175	2002 VF_{113}	—	November 13, 2002	Palomar	NEAT	·	900 m	MPC · JPL
405176	2002 VB_{123}	—	November 13, 2002	Palomar	NEAT	·	1.4 km	MPC · JPL
405177	2002 VX_{125}	—	November 14, 2002	Palomar	NEAT	H	630 m	MPC · JPL
405178	2002 VN_{133}	—	November 5, 2002	Socorro	LINEAR	·	1.2 km	MPC · JPL
405179	2002 WT_{1}	—	November 23, 2002	Palomar	NEAT	·	910 m	MPC · JPL
405180	2002 WF_{2}	—	November 23, 2002	Palomar	NEAT	·	900 m	MPC · JPL
405181	2002 XA_{22}	—	December 2, 2002	Haleakala	NEAT	(5)	990 m	MPC · JPL
405182	2002 XU_{117}	—	December 10, 2002	Palomar	NEAT	(5)	1.0 km	MPC · JPL
405183	2002 YS_{15}	—	December 31, 2002	Kitt Peak	Spacewatch	·	1.7 km	MPC · JPL
405184	2003 AC_{15}	—	January 3, 2003	Socorro	LINEAR	·	1.5 km	MPC · JPL
405185	2003 AQ_{21}	—	January 5, 2003	Socorro	LINEAR	·	1.9 km	MPC · JPL
405186	2003 AF_{42}	—	January 7, 2003	Socorro	LINEAR	·	1.5 km	MPC · JPL
405187	2003 AV_{66}	—	January 7, 2003	Socorro	LINEAR	·	2.5 km	MPC · JPL
405188	2003 AM_{75}	—	January 10, 2003	Socorro	LINEAR	·	2.1 km	MPC · JPL
405189	2003 BO_{1}	—	January 25, 2003	Palomar	NEAT	AMO	250 m	MPC · JPL
405190	2003 BK_{4}	—	January 25, 2003	La Silla	A. Boattini, H. Scholl	·	1.6 km	MPC · JPL
405191	2003 BE_{5}	—	January 24, 2003	La Silla	A. Boattini, H. Scholl	·	1.6 km	MPC · JPL
405192	2003 BM_{30}	—	January 27, 2003	Socorro	LINEAR	·	2.5 km	MPC · JPL
405193	2003 BJ_{59}	—	January 27, 2003	Socorro	LINEAR	·	2.5 km	MPC · JPL
405194	2003 CD_{1}	—	February 1, 2003	Palomar	NEAT	·	2.2 km	MPC · JPL
405195	2003 CX_{18}	—	February 8, 2003	Anderson Mesa	LONEOS	·	3.6 km	MPC · JPL
405196	2003 CQ_{25}	—	February 6, 2003	Socorro	LINEAR	·	2.3 km	MPC · JPL
405197	2003 DU_{4}	—	February 22, 2003	Palomar	NEAT	·	2.6 km	MPC · JPL
405198	2003 DU_{21}	—	February 28, 2003	Socorro	LINEAR	·	1.9 km	MPC · JPL
405199	2003 DW_{21}	—	February 28, 2003	Socorro	LINEAR	·	1.9 km	MPC · JPL
405200	2003 EE_{50}	—	March 11, 2003	Palomar	NEAT	·	600 m	MPC · JPL

== 405201–405300 ==
back to top

Designation			Discovery			Properties		Ref
Permanent	Provisional	Named after	Date	Site	Discoverer(s)	Category	Diam.	Ref
405201	2003 FF_{3}	—	February 26, 2003	Socorro	LINEAR	H	620 m	MPC · JPL
405202	2003 FW_{74}	—	March 26, 2003	Palomar	NEAT	H	520 m	MPC · JPL
405203	2003 GC_{57}	—	April 7, 2003	Desert Eagle	W. K. Y. Yeung	·	580 m	MPC · JPL
405204	2003 HP_{8}	—	April 25, 2003	Anderson Mesa	LONEOS	·	970 m	MPC · JPL
405205	2003 HS_{29}	—	April 28, 2003	Anderson Mesa	LONEOS	·	810 m	MPC · JPL
405206	2003 HK_{42}	—	April 28, 2003	Anderson Mesa	LONEOS	·	2.4 km	MPC · JPL
405207 Konstanz	2003 KP_{18}	Konstanz	May 24, 2003	Kleť	KLENOT	·	2.6 km	MPC · JPL
405208	2003 ND_{10}	—	July 3, 2003	Kitt Peak	Spacewatch	·	930 m	MPC · JPL
405209	2003 OV_{2}	—	July 23, 2003	Palomar	NEAT	·	2.1 km	MPC · JPL
405210	2003 OY_{10}	—	July 27, 2003	Reedy Creek	J. Broughton	·	1.2 km	MPC · JPL
405211	2003 PD_{6}	—	August 1, 2003	Socorro	LINEAR	H	710 m	MPC · JPL
405212	2003 QC_{10}	—	August 22, 2003	Socorro	LINEAR	APO +1km · PHA	880 m	MPC · JPL
405213	2003 QN_{14}	—	August 20, 2003	Palomar	NEAT	·	1.0 km	MPC · JPL
405214	2003 QC_{39}	—	August 22, 2003	Palomar	NEAT	H	670 m	MPC · JPL
405215	2003 QH_{48}	—	August 20, 2003	Palomar	NEAT	V	760 m	MPC · JPL
405216	2003 QL_{59}	—	August 23, 2003	Socorro	LINEAR	·	1.3 km	MPC · JPL
405217	2003 QD_{72}	—	August 26, 2003	Socorro	LINEAR	·	3.4 km	MPC · JPL
405218	2003 QV_{111}	—	August 31, 2003	Haleakala	NEAT	·	4.3 km	MPC · JPL
405219	2003 QY_{114}	—	August 22, 2003	Palomar	NEAT	NYS	1.1 km	MPC · JPL
405220	2003 RM_{2}	—	September 1, 2003	Socorro	LINEAR	LIX	4.1 km	MPC · JPL
405221	2003 RM_{3}	—	September 1, 2003	Socorro	LINEAR	·	1.1 km	MPC · JPL
405222	2003 RV_{20}	—	August 26, 2003	Socorro	LINEAR	MAS	770 m	MPC · JPL
405223	2003 SK_{31}	—	September 18, 2003	Kitt Peak	Spacewatch	NYS	1.2 km	MPC · JPL
405224	2003 SO_{32}	—	September 16, 2003	Palomar	NEAT	·	3.7 km	MPC · JPL
405225	2003 SW_{33}	—	September 18, 2003	Socorro	LINEAR	TIR	3.0 km	MPC · JPL
405226	2003 SA_{41}	—	September 17, 2003	Palomar	NEAT	TIR	3.2 km	MPC · JPL
405227	2003 SA_{43}	—	September 16, 2003	Anderson Mesa	LONEOS	·	4.4 km	MPC · JPL
405228	2003 SP_{62}	—	September 17, 2003	Kitt Peak	Spacewatch	·	3.5 km	MPC · JPL
405229	2003 SA_{66}	—	September 18, 2003	Socorro	LINEAR	·	1.5 km	MPC · JPL
405230	2003 SJ_{79}	—	September 19, 2003	Kitt Peak	Spacewatch	·	3.1 km	MPC · JPL
405231	2003 SJ_{83}	—	September 18, 2003	Kitt Peak	Spacewatch	·	3.2 km	MPC · JPL
405232	2003 SU_{90}	—	September 18, 2003	Socorro	LINEAR	·	1.1 km	MPC · JPL
405233	2003 SH_{111}	—	September 18, 2003	Campo Imperatore	CINEOS	·	4.7 km	MPC · JPL
405234	2003 SU_{117}	—	September 16, 2003	Palomar	NEAT	·	1.0 km	MPC · JPL
405235	2003 SS_{121}	—	September 17, 2003	Kitt Peak	Spacewatch	·	3.1 km	MPC · JPL
405236	2003 SU_{121}	—	September 17, 2003	Palomar	NEAT	EUP	4.0 km	MPC · JPL
405237	2003 SL_{130}	—	September 20, 2003	Socorro	LINEAR	THB	2.7 km	MPC · JPL
405238	2003 SW_{131}	—	September 18, 2003	Kitt Peak	Spacewatch	·	3.5 km	MPC · JPL
405239	2003 SU_{132}	—	September 19, 2003	Kitt Peak	Spacewatch	THM	2.3 km	MPC · JPL
405240	2003 ST_{133}	—	September 18, 2003	Palomar	NEAT	·	2.4 km	MPC · JPL
405241	2003 SC_{140}	—	September 18, 2003	Campo Imperatore	CINEOS	V	640 m	MPC · JPL
405242	2003 SM_{141}	—	September 19, 2003	Palomar	NEAT	·	2.7 km	MPC · JPL
405243	2003 SL_{151}	—	September 17, 2003	Haleakala	NEAT	·	3.4 km	MPC · JPL
405244	2003 SV_{154}	—	September 19, 2003	Anderson Mesa	LONEOS	·	1.4 km	MPC · JPL
405245	2003 SP_{179}	—	September 19, 2003	Palomar	NEAT	·	4.7 km	MPC · JPL
405246	2003 SB_{187}	—	September 22, 2003	Anderson Mesa	LONEOS	EUP	4.9 km	MPC · JPL
405247	2003 SG_{202}	—	September 22, 2003	Anderson Mesa	LONEOS	TIR	3.0 km	MPC · JPL
405248	2003 SN_{203}	—	September 22, 2003	Anderson Mesa	LONEOS	·	2.5 km	MPC · JPL
405249	2003 SD_{206}	—	September 23, 2003	Palomar	NEAT	·	1.6 km	MPC · JPL
405250	2003 SE_{206}	—	September 2, 2003	Socorro	LINEAR	·	3.7 km	MPC · JPL
405251	2003 ST_{230}	—	September 24, 2003	Palomar	NEAT	·	1.1 km	MPC · JPL
405252	2003 SL_{244}	—	September 17, 2003	Kitt Peak	Spacewatch	·	930 m	MPC · JPL
405253	2003 SZ_{248}	—	September 26, 2003	Socorro	LINEAR	·	2.3 km	MPC · JPL
405254	2003 SR_{264}	—	September 28, 2003	Socorro	LINEAR	·	3.7 km	MPC · JPL
405255	2003 SY_{264}	—	September 28, 2003	Socorro	LINEAR	·	3.7 km	MPC · JPL
405256	2003 SY_{265}	—	September 29, 2003	Socorro	LINEAR	MAS	630 m	MPC · JPL
405257	2003 SZ_{265}	—	September 29, 2003	Socorro	LINEAR	MAS	810 m	MPC · JPL
405258	2003 SS_{266}	—	September 29, 2003	Socorro	LINEAR	·	4.4 km	MPC · JPL
405259	2003 SR_{269}	—	September 28, 2003	Goodricke-Pigott	R. A. Tucker	·	1.4 km	MPC · JPL
405260	2003 SY_{285}	—	September 20, 2003	Kitt Peak	Spacewatch	·	3.0 km	MPC · JPL
405261	2003 SB_{287}	—	September 29, 2003	Kitt Peak	Spacewatch	·	2.4 km	MPC · JPL
405262	2003 SK_{288}	—	September 28, 2003	Desert Eagle	W. K. Y. Yeung	HYG	2.4 km	MPC · JPL
405263	2003 SQ_{301}	—	September 17, 2003	Palomar	NEAT	·	2.9 km	MPC · JPL
405264	2003 SF_{311}	—	September 29, 2003	Socorro	LINEAR	MAS	640 m	MPC · JPL
405265	2003 SG_{313}	—	September 18, 2003	Kitt Peak	Spacewatch	·	3.0 km	MPC · JPL
405266	2003 SV_{322}	—	September 16, 2003	Kitt Peak	Spacewatch	·	3.1 km	MPC · JPL
405267	2003 SL_{324}	—	September 17, 2003	Kitt Peak	Spacewatch	·	2.8 km	MPC · JPL
405268	2003 SW_{325}	—	September 18, 2003	Palomar	NEAT	HYG	2.4 km	MPC · JPL
405269	2003 SD_{326}	—	September 18, 2003	Kitt Peak	Spacewatch	·	1 km	MPC · JPL
405270	2003 SZ_{326}	—	September 18, 2003	Kitt Peak	Spacewatch	·	2.1 km	MPC · JPL
405271	2003 SV_{328}	—	September 21, 2003	Kitt Peak	Spacewatch	THM	2.2 km	MPC · JPL
405272	2003 SM_{332}	—	September 28, 2003	Kitt Peak	Spacewatch	LIX	3.5 km	MPC · JPL
405273	2003 SJ_{335}	—	September 26, 2003	Apache Point	SDSS	·	2.8 km	MPC · JPL
405274	2003 SM_{336}	—	September 27, 2003	Apache Point	SDSS	·	2.0 km	MPC · JPL
405275	2003 SR_{338}	—	September 26, 2003	Apache Point	SDSS	·	3.7 km	MPC · JPL
405276	2003 SY_{338}	—	September 26, 2003	Apache Point	SDSS	·	2.8 km	MPC · JPL
405277	2003 SF_{339}	—	September 26, 2003	Apache Point	SDSS	·	3.0 km	MPC · JPL
405278	2003 SF_{340}	—	September 28, 2003	Apache Point	SDSS	·	3.4 km	MPC · JPL
405279	2003 SY_{349}	—	September 18, 2003	Kitt Peak	Spacewatch	·	2.6 km	MPC · JPL
405280	2003 SZ_{365}	—	September 16, 2003	Kitt Peak	Spacewatch	EOS	2.3 km	MPC · JPL
405281	2003 SD_{400}	—	September 26, 2003	Apache Point	SDSS	PHO	760 m	MPC · JPL
405282	2003 SQ_{402}	—	September 27, 2003	Kitt Peak	Spacewatch	·	3.3 km	MPC · JPL
405283	2003 SW_{404}	—	September 27, 2003	Apache Point	SDSS	·	1.7 km	MPC · JPL
405284	2003 SC_{422}	—	September 26, 2003	Apache Point	SDSS	EOS	1.8 km	MPC · JPL
405285	2003 SV_{424}	—	September 25, 2003	Mauna Kea	P. A. Wiegert	·	3.2 km	MPC · JPL
405286	2003 SY_{431}	—	September 17, 2003	Kitt Peak	Spacewatch	(1298)	2.8 km	MPC · JPL
405287	2003 SK_{433}	—	September 28, 2003	Apache Point	SDSS	·	4.3 km	MPC · JPL
405288	2003 TL_{5}	—	October 3, 2003	Kitt Peak	Spacewatch	·	1.6 km	MPC · JPL
405289	2003 TS_{8}	—	October 3, 2003	Kitt Peak	Spacewatch	LIX	6.2 km	MPC · JPL
405290	2003 TC_{13}	—	October 5, 2003	Socorro	LINEAR	·	2.9 km	MPC · JPL
405291	2003 TH_{14}	—	October 14, 2003	Anderson Mesa	LONEOS	·	2.9 km	MPC · JPL
405292	2003 TJ_{16}	—	October 15, 2003	Anderson Mesa	LONEOS	LIX	4.8 km	MPC · JPL
405293	2003 TR_{16}	—	October 14, 2003	Palomar	NEAT	·	3.4 km	MPC · JPL
405294	2003 TK_{17}	—	October 15, 2003	Palomar	NEAT	H	650 m	MPC · JPL
405295	2003 TC_{36}	—	October 1, 2003	Kitt Peak	Spacewatch	·	3.5 km	MPC · JPL
405296	2003 TW_{39}	—	October 2, 2003	Kitt Peak	Spacewatch	V	480 m	MPC · JPL
405297	2003 TM_{54}	—	October 5, 2003	Kitt Peak	Spacewatch	·	3.1 km	MPC · JPL
405298	2003 TG_{57}	—	October 5, 2003	Socorro	LINEAR	(58892)	4.3 km	MPC · JPL
405299	2003 TZ_{58}	—	October 2, 2003	Kitt Peak	Spacewatch	·	2.9 km	MPC · JPL
405300	2003 UQ	—	October 16, 2003	Socorro	LINEAR	T_{j} (2.98)	6.3 km	MPC · JPL

== 405301–405400 ==
back to top

Designation			Discovery			Properties		Ref
Permanent	Provisional	Named after	Date	Site	Discoverer(s)	Category	Diam.	Ref
405301	2003 UH_{5}	—	October 18, 2003	Wrightwood	J. W. Young	LIX	4.7 km	MPC · JPL
405302	2003 UO_{7}	—	August 28, 2003	Socorro	LINEAR	·	3.6 km	MPC · JPL
405303	2003 UW_{17}	—	October 16, 2003	Kitt Peak	Spacewatch	·	950 m	MPC · JPL
405304	2003 UH_{25}	—	October 22, 2003	Kingsnake	J. V. McClusky	·	3.5 km	MPC · JPL
405305	2003 UJ_{25}	—	October 22, 2003	Kingsnake	J. V. McClusky	·	3.4 km	MPC · JPL
405306	2003 UP_{29}	—	October 24, 2003	Socorro	LINEAR	·	3.4 km	MPC · JPL
405307	2003 UH_{33}	—	September 30, 2003	Kitt Peak	Spacewatch	·	2.9 km	MPC · JPL
405308	2003 UQ_{35}	—	October 16, 2003	Kitt Peak	Spacewatch	·	1.3 km	MPC · JPL
405309	2003 US_{57}	—	October 16, 2003	Kitt Peak	Spacewatch	VER	3.8 km	MPC · JPL
405310	2003 UB_{62}	—	September 28, 2003	Anderson Mesa	LONEOS	·	1.4 km	MPC · JPL
405311	2003 UX_{66}	—	October 18, 2003	Socorro	LINEAR	·	1.2 km	MPC · JPL
405312	2003 UP_{69}	—	September 21, 2003	Kitt Peak	Spacewatch	·	2.9 km	MPC · JPL
405313	2003 UT_{81}	—	October 17, 2003	Kitt Peak	Spacewatch	NYS	1.4 km	MPC · JPL
405314	2003 UJ_{82}	—	October 19, 2003	Kitt Peak	Spacewatch	·	2.2 km	MPC · JPL
405315	2003 UM_{95}	—	October 18, 2003	Kitt Peak	Spacewatch	PHO	1.1 km	MPC · JPL
405316	2003 UN_{99}	—	October 19, 2003	Anderson Mesa	LONEOS	·	5.0 km	MPC · JPL
405317	2003 UM_{101}	—	September 29, 2003	Socorro	LINEAR	TIR	2.8 km	MPC · JPL
405318	2003 UW_{105}	—	October 18, 2003	Palomar	NEAT	·	4.4 km	MPC · JPL
405319	2003 UJ_{149}	—	September 28, 2003	Socorro	LINEAR	NYS	1.2 km	MPC · JPL
405320	2003 UU_{164}	—	October 21, 2003	Socorro	LINEAR	NYS	1.3 km	MPC · JPL
405321	2003 UN_{165}	—	October 21, 2003	Kitt Peak	Spacewatch	EOS	2.5 km	MPC · JPL
405322	2003 UN_{176}	—	October 21, 2003	Anderson Mesa	LONEOS	NYS	1.2 km	MPC · JPL
405323	2003 UF_{195}	—	October 20, 2003	Kitt Peak	Spacewatch	·	1.2 km	MPC · JPL
405324	2003 UT_{221}	—	October 22, 2003	Kitt Peak	Spacewatch	HYG	3.6 km	MPC · JPL
405325	2003 UM_{225}	—	October 22, 2003	Kitt Peak	Spacewatch	·	1.1 km	MPC · JPL
405326	2003 UM_{235}	—	October 19, 2003	Kitt Peak	Spacewatch	THM	2.1 km	MPC · JPL
405327	2003 UT_{239}	—	September 30, 2003	Kitt Peak	Spacewatch	·	1.0 km	MPC · JPL
405328	2003 UH_{245}	—	October 24, 2003	Socorro	LINEAR	·	1.2 km	MPC · JPL
405329	2003 UW_{249}	—	October 25, 2003	Socorro	LINEAR	·	4.0 km	MPC · JPL
405330	2003 UP_{266}	—	October 28, 2003	Socorro	LINEAR	NYS	1.1 km	MPC · JPL
405331	2003 UV_{269}	—	October 29, 2003	Catalina	CSS	·	3.8 km	MPC · JPL
405332	2003 UM_{279}	—	October 27, 2003	Kitt Peak	Spacewatch	·	4.5 km	MPC · JPL
405333	2003 UB_{282}	—	September 20, 2003	Kitt Peak	Spacewatch	VER	3.2 km	MPC · JPL
405334	2003 UR_{296}	—	September 28, 2003	Kitt Peak	Spacewatch	THM	2.1 km	MPC · JPL
405335	2003 UN_{302}	—	October 17, 2003	Kitt Peak	Spacewatch	·	3.6 km	MPC · JPL
405336	2003 UW_{320}	—	October 24, 2003	Socorro	LINEAR	·	5.2 km	MPC · JPL
405337	2003 UL_{327}	—	October 17, 2003	Apache Point	SDSS	·	2.0 km	MPC · JPL
405338	2003 UH_{328}	—	October 17, 2003	Apache Point	SDSS	·	4.5 km	MPC · JPL
405339	2003 UZ_{328}	—	October 17, 2003	Apache Point	SDSS	·	4.7 km	MPC · JPL
405340	2003 UF_{334}	—	October 18, 2003	Apache Point	SDSS	·	3.7 km	MPC · JPL
405341	2003 UP_{336}	—	October 18, 2003	Apache Point	SDSS	THM	1.9 km	MPC · JPL
405342	2003 UE_{340}	—	October 18, 2003	Kitt Peak	Spacewatch	THM	2.6 km	MPC · JPL
405343	2003 UP_{340}	—	October 18, 2003	Kitt Peak	Spacewatch	·	870 m	MPC · JPL
405344	2003 UN_{352}	—	October 19, 2003	Apache Point	SDSS	·	1.2 km	MPC · JPL
405345	2003 UX_{371}	—	October 22, 2003	Kitt Peak	Spacewatch	EOS	2.6 km	MPC · JPL
405346	2003 UX_{372}	—	October 22, 2003	Apache Point	SDSS	·	3.1 km	MPC · JPL
405347	2003 UT_{401}	—	September 19, 2003	Kitt Peak	Spacewatch	EOS	1.9 km	MPC · JPL
405348	2003 UE_{415}	—	October 19, 2003	Kitt Peak	Spacewatch	·	3.0 km	MPC · JPL
405349	2003 VU_{6}	—	November 15, 2003	Kitt Peak	Spacewatch	·	1.0 km	MPC · JPL
405350	2003 VV_{11}	—	November 3, 2003	Socorro	LINEAR	·	4.0 km	MPC · JPL
405351	2003 WV_{10}	—	November 18, 2003	Kitt Peak	Spacewatch	·	3.9 km	MPC · JPL
405352	2003 WM_{27}	—	November 16, 2003	Kitt Peak	Spacewatch	·	1.3 km	MPC · JPL
405353	2003 WY_{27}	—	November 16, 2003	Kitt Peak	Spacewatch	V	750 m	MPC · JPL
405354	2003 WO_{39}	—	November 19, 2003	Kitt Peak	Spacewatch	·	1.5 km	MPC · JPL
405355	2003 WF_{46}	—	November 21, 2003	Socorro	LINEAR	H	650 m	MPC · JPL
405356	2003 WM_{54}	—	November 20, 2003	Socorro	LINEAR	·	1.2 km	MPC · JPL
405357	2003 WP_{58}	—	November 18, 2003	Kitt Peak	Spacewatch	NYS	1.1 km	MPC · JPL
405358	2003 WF_{60}	—	October 24, 2003	Socorro	LINEAR	·	1.4 km	MPC · JPL
405359	2003 WN_{63}	—	November 19, 2003	Kitt Peak	Spacewatch	·	3.5 km	MPC · JPL
405360	2003 WZ_{80}	—	November 20, 2003	Socorro	LINEAR	·	1.1 km	MPC · JPL
405361	2003 WW_{98}	—	November 20, 2003	Catalina	CSS	LIX	3.7 km	MPC · JPL
405362	2003 WT_{114}	—	November 20, 2003	Socorro	LINEAR	·	1.0 km	MPC · JPL
405363	2003 WB_{116}	—	November 20, 2003	Socorro	LINEAR	·	1.3 km	MPC · JPL
405364	2003 WR_{124}	—	November 20, 2003	Socorro	LINEAR	·	1.6 km	MPC · JPL
405365	2003 WG_{132}	—	November 19, 2003	Kitt Peak	Spacewatch	·	3.7 km	MPC · JPL
405366	2003 WM_{151}	—	November 26, 2003	Kitt Peak	Spacewatch	·	1.1 km	MPC · JPL
405367	2003 WN_{153}	—	November 26, 2003	Anderson Mesa	LONEOS	·	5.8 km	MPC · JPL
405368	2003 XO_{25}	—	December 1, 2003	Socorro	LINEAR	LIX	4.3 km	MPC · JPL
405369	2003 XU_{37}	—	December 4, 2003	Socorro	LINEAR	·	1.5 km	MPC · JPL
405370	2003 YG_{18}	—	December 17, 2003	Kitt Peak	Spacewatch	·	1.3 km	MPC · JPL
405371	2003 YK_{121}	—	December 27, 2003	Socorro	LINEAR	T_{j} (2.91)	3.8 km	MPC · JPL
405372	2003 YF_{152}	—	December 29, 2003	Socorro	LINEAR	·	3.3 km	MPC · JPL
405373	2004 AR_{23}	—	January 15, 2004	Kitt Peak	Spacewatch	MAR	1.0 km	MPC · JPL
405374	2004 BR_{29}	—	January 18, 2004	Palomar	NEAT	·	1.3 km	MPC · JPL
405375	2004 BN_{48}	—	January 21, 2004	Socorro	LINEAR	·	1.5 km	MPC · JPL
405376	2004 BJ_{69}	—	January 18, 2004	Kitt Peak	Spacewatch	·	1.1 km	MPC · JPL
405377	2004 BK_{73}	—	December 27, 2003	Socorro	LINEAR	·	2.2 km	MPC · JPL
405378	2004 BJ_{128}	—	January 16, 2004	Kitt Peak	Spacewatch	·	850 m	MPC · JPL
405379	2004 BM_{141}	—	January 19, 2004	Kitt Peak	Spacewatch	·	1.1 km	MPC · JPL
405380	2004 BK_{145}	—	January 19, 2004	Kitt Peak	Spacewatch	MAR	1.4 km	MPC · JPL
405381	2004 BJ_{159}	—	January 20, 2004	Cerro Paranal	Cerro Paranal	·	1.3 km	MPC · JPL
405382	2004 CK_{14}	—	February 11, 2004	Kitt Peak	Spacewatch	EUN	1.2 km	MPC · JPL
405383	2004 CM_{60}	—	February 11, 2004	Palomar	NEAT	·	1.4 km	MPC · JPL
405384	2004 DS_{67}	—	February 26, 2004	Kitt Peak	M. W. Buie	·	1.4 km	MPC · JPL
405385	2004 DN_{70}	—	February 26, 2004	Socorro	LINEAR	EUN	1.1 km	MPC · JPL
405386	2004 ED_{20}	—	March 14, 2004	Catalina	CSS	EUN	1.4 km	MPC · JPL
405387	2004 EV_{36}	—	March 13, 2004	Palomar	NEAT	·	2.1 km	MPC · JPL
405388	2004 EU_{86}	—	March 15, 2004	Kitt Peak	Spacewatch	·	1.8 km	MPC · JPL
405389	2004 EZ_{91}	—	March 15, 2004	Kitt Peak	Spacewatch	EUN	1.2 km	MPC · JPL
405390	2004 FH_{67}	—	March 20, 2004	Socorro	LINEAR	·	680 m	MPC · JPL
405391	2004 FF_{72}	—	March 17, 2004	Kitt Peak	Spacewatch	·	970 m	MPC · JPL
405392	2004 FA_{76}	—	March 17, 2004	Kitt Peak	Spacewatch	·	1.3 km	MPC · JPL
405393	2004 GQ_{41}	—	April 13, 2004	Palomar	NEAT	·	2.1 km	MPC · JPL
405394	2004 HS_{8}	—	April 16, 2004	Socorro	LINEAR	·	1.4 km	MPC · JPL
405395	2004 HW_{39}	—	April 19, 2004	Kitt Peak	Spacewatch	·	3.1 km	MPC · JPL
405396	2004 JU_{4}	—	May 11, 2004	Anderson Mesa	LONEOS	EUN	1.7 km	MPC · JPL
405397	2004 LB_{12}	—	June 15, 2004	Socorro	LINEAR	·	440 m	MPC · JPL
405398	2004 LJ_{28}	—	June 14, 2004	Kitt Peak	Spacewatch	·	540 m	MPC · JPL
405399	2004 OJ	—	July 16, 2004	Socorro	LINEAR	·	650 m	MPC · JPL
405400	2004 PB_{8}	—	August 6, 2004	Palomar	NEAT	·	1.8 km	MPC · JPL

== 405401–405500 ==
back to top

Designation			Discovery			Properties		Ref
Permanent	Provisional	Named after	Date	Site	Discoverer(s)	Category	Diam.	Ref
405401	2004 PH_{35}	—	August 8, 2004	Anderson Mesa	LONEOS	·	1.5 km	MPC · JPL
405402	2004 PT_{35}	—	August 8, 2004	Anderson Mesa	LONEOS	·	2.0 km	MPC · JPL
405403	2004 PJ_{50}	—	August 8, 2004	Socorro	LINEAR	·	720 m	MPC · JPL
405404	2004 PJ_{77}	—	August 9, 2004	Socorro	LINEAR	·	630 m	MPC · JPL
405405	2004 PE_{88}	—	August 11, 2004	Socorro	LINEAR	·	1.5 km	MPC · JPL
405406	2004 RN_{18}	—	September 7, 2004	Kitt Peak	Spacewatch	·	690 m	MPC · JPL
405407	2004 RJ_{23}	—	August 26, 2004	Catalina	CSS	·	630 m	MPC · JPL
405408	2004 RA_{31}	—	August 12, 2004	Socorro	LINEAR	·	700 m	MPC · JPL
405409	2004 RQ_{72}	—	September 8, 2004	Socorro	LINEAR	·	850 m	MPC · JPL
405410	2004 RQ_{73}	—	September 8, 2004	Socorro	LINEAR	·	780 m	MPC · JPL
405411	2004 RT_{98}	—	September 8, 2004	Socorro	LINEAR	·	730 m	MPC · JPL
405412	2004 RX_{98}	—	August 23, 2004	Kitt Peak	Spacewatch	·	740 m	MPC · JPL
405413	2004 RZ_{135}	—	September 7, 2004	Kitt Peak	Spacewatch	·	1.8 km	MPC · JPL
405414	2004 RL_{145}	—	August 23, 2004	Kitt Peak	Spacewatch	H	430 m	MPC · JPL
405415	2004 RN_{162}	—	September 11, 2004	Socorro	LINEAR	·	3.4 km	MPC · JPL
405416	2004 RG_{172}	—	September 9, 2004	Socorro	LINEAR	·	710 m	MPC · JPL
405417	2004 RS_{197}	—	September 10, 2004	Socorro	LINEAR	·	740 m	MPC · JPL
405418	2004 RX_{204}	—	September 12, 2004	Kitt Peak	Spacewatch	EOS	2.2 km	MPC · JPL
405419	2004 RV_{207}	—	September 11, 2004	Socorro	LINEAR	·	3.3 km	MPC · JPL
405420	2004 RU_{240}	—	September 10, 2004	Kitt Peak	Spacewatch	·	700 m	MPC · JPL
405421	2004 RB_{321}	—	September 13, 2004	Socorro	LINEAR	·	760 m	MPC · JPL
405422	2004 RJ_{322}	—	September 13, 2004	Socorro	LINEAR	·	2.0 km	MPC · JPL
405423	2004 RE_{328}	—	September 15, 2004	Kitt Peak	Spacewatch	·	2.0 km	MPC · JPL
405424	2004 RS_{335}	—	September 15, 2004	Kitt Peak	Spacewatch	·	560 m	MPC · JPL
405425	2004 RE_{346}	—	September 7, 2004	Kitt Peak	Spacewatch	·	790 m	MPC · JPL
405426	2004 SL_{2}	—	September 16, 2004	Vail-Jarnac	Jarnac	·	3.0 km	MPC · JPL
405427	2004 ST_{9}	—	September 17, 2004	Kitt Peak	Spacewatch	AMO +1km	860 m	MPC · JPL
405428	2004 ST_{34}	—	September 17, 2004	Kitt Peak	Spacewatch	·	2.5 km	MPC · JPL
405429	2004 SF_{35}	—	August 25, 2004	Kitt Peak	Spacewatch	·	530 m	MPC · JPL
405430	2004 SX_{48}	—	September 21, 2004	Socorro	LINEAR	·	1.6 km	MPC · JPL
405431	2004 SJ_{49}	—	September 21, 2004	Socorro	LINEAR	·	790 m	MPC · JPL
405432	2004 TF_{2}	—	October 4, 2004	Kitt Peak	Spacewatch	·	700 m	MPC · JPL
405433	2004 TW_{4}	—	October 4, 2004	Kitt Peak	Spacewatch	·	1.1 km	MPC · JPL
405434	2004 TT_{21}	—	October 4, 2004	Kitt Peak	Spacewatch	·	2.5 km	MPC · JPL
405435	2004 TJ_{27}	—	October 4, 2004	Kitt Peak	Spacewatch	·	590 m	MPC · JPL
405436	2004 TT_{35}	—	October 4, 2004	Kitt Peak	Spacewatch	·	680 m	MPC · JPL
405437	2004 TC_{51}	—	October 4, 2004	Kitt Peak	Spacewatch	·	3.2 km	MPC · JPL
405438	2004 TE_{64}	—	October 5, 2004	Kitt Peak	Spacewatch	·	2.3 km	MPC · JPL
405439	2004 TG_{64}	—	October 5, 2004	Kitt Peak	Spacewatch	·	2.8 km	MPC · JPL
405440	2004 TO_{78}	—	October 4, 2004	Socorro	LINEAR	·	3.4 km	MPC · JPL
405441	2004 TD_{83}	—	October 5, 2004	Kitt Peak	Spacewatch	·	2.1 km	MPC · JPL
405442	2004 TL_{83}	—	October 5, 2004	Kitt Peak	Spacewatch	·	1.6 km	MPC · JPL
405443	2004 TT_{83}	—	October 5, 2004	Kitt Peak	Spacewatch	·	2.3 km	MPC · JPL
405444	2004 TL_{84}	—	October 5, 2004	Kitt Peak	Spacewatch	·	610 m	MPC · JPL
405445	2004 TU_{85}	—	October 5, 2004	Kitt Peak	Spacewatch	·	780 m	MPC · JPL
405446	2004 TP_{86}	—	October 5, 2004	Kitt Peak	Spacewatch	EOS	1.9 km	MPC · JPL
405447	2004 TV_{90}	—	September 7, 2004	Kitt Peak	Spacewatch	·	700 m	MPC · JPL
405448	2004 TM_{99}	—	October 5, 2004	Kitt Peak	Spacewatch	·	1.9 km	MPC · JPL
405449	2004 TN_{112}	—	October 7, 2004	Palomar	NEAT	·	2.9 km	MPC · JPL
405450	2004 TR_{151}	—	September 10, 2004	Kitt Peak	Spacewatch	·	2.4 km	MPC · JPL
405451	2004 TT_{175}	—	October 9, 2004	Socorro	LINEAR	·	870 m	MPC · JPL
405452	2004 TV_{197}	—	October 7, 2004	Kitt Peak	Spacewatch	·	890 m	MPC · JPL
405453	2004 TB_{206}	—	October 7, 2004	Kitt Peak	Spacewatch	·	3.3 km	MPC · JPL
405454	2004 TP_{221}	—	October 7, 2004	Socorro	LINEAR	·	1.6 km	MPC · JPL
405455	2004 TN_{238}	—	October 9, 2004	Kitt Peak	Spacewatch	·	640 m	MPC · JPL
405456	2004 TG_{244}	—	August 26, 2004	Catalina	CSS	·	680 m	MPC · JPL
405457	2004 TF_{250}	—	October 7, 2004	Kitt Peak	Spacewatch	·	2.3 km	MPC · JPL
405458	2004 TC_{266}	—	October 9, 2004	Kitt Peak	Spacewatch	·	3.2 km	MPC · JPL
405459	2004 TX_{275}	—	October 9, 2004	Kitt Peak	Spacewatch	EOS	2.0 km	MPC · JPL
405460	2004 TT_{276}	—	October 9, 2004	Kitt Peak	Spacewatch	·	1.5 km	MPC · JPL
405461	2004 TR_{277}	—	October 9, 2004	Kitt Peak	Spacewatch	·	2.6 km	MPC · JPL
405462	2004 TS_{293}	—	October 10, 2004	Kitt Peak	Spacewatch	·	1.6 km	MPC · JPL
405463	2004 TT_{337}	—	October 12, 2004	Kitt Peak	Spacewatch	EOS	2.0 km	MPC · JPL
405464	2004 TE_{338}	—	October 12, 2004	Kitt Peak	Spacewatch	·	750 m	MPC · JPL
405465	2004 TA_{350}	—	October 10, 2004	Kitt Peak	Spacewatch	KOR	1.3 km	MPC · JPL
405466	2004 TE_{367}	—	October 5, 2004	Palomar	NEAT	EOS	2.8 km	MPC · JPL
405467	2004 VP_{1}	—	November 4, 2004	Socorro	LINEAR	·	920 m	MPC · JPL
405468	2004 VS_{11}	—	October 7, 2004	Anderson Mesa	LONEOS	·	3.7 km	MPC · JPL
405469	2004 VL_{23}	—	November 5, 2004	Palomar	NEAT	·	1.8 km	MPC · JPL
405470	2004 VT_{34}	—	November 3, 2004	Kitt Peak	Spacewatch	EOS	1.8 km	MPC · JPL
405471	2004 VQ_{36}	—	November 4, 2004	Kitt Peak	Spacewatch	·	740 m	MPC · JPL
405472	2004 VX_{53}	—	November 7, 2004	Socorro	LINEAR	·	1.0 km	MPC · JPL
405473	2004 VY_{68}	—	November 10, 2004	Kitt Peak	Spacewatch	·	2.6 km	MPC · JPL
405474	2004 VO_{78}	—	November 3, 2004	Socorro	LINEAR	PHO	1.3 km	MPC · JPL
405475	2004 VP_{96}	—	October 14, 1998	Kitt Peak	Spacewatch	·	3.3 km	MPC · JPL
405476	2004 VG_{112}	—	November 9, 2004	Catalina	CSS	·	2.8 km	MPC · JPL
405477	2004 WE	—	November 17, 2004	Siding Spring	SSS	·	660 m	MPC · JPL
405478	2004 WN	—	November 4, 2004	Catalina	CSS	·	560 m	MPC · JPL
405479	2004 XR	—	December 1, 2004	Palomar	NEAT	·	4.2 km	MPC · JPL
405480	2004 XX	—	December 1, 2004	Palomar	NEAT	·	3.1 km	MPC · JPL
405481	2004 XG_{2}	—	December 1, 2004	Palomar	NEAT	·	4.4 km	MPC · JPL
405482	2004 XT_{2}	—	December 2, 2004	Catalina	CSS	·	2.3 km	MPC · JPL
405483	2004 XR_{6}	—	December 2, 2004	Socorro	LINEAR	·	2.8 km	MPC · JPL
405484	2004 XP_{11}	—	December 3, 2004	Kitt Peak	Spacewatch	PHO	1.7 km	MPC · JPL
405485	2004 XW_{16}	—	December 3, 2004	Kitt Peak	Spacewatch	·	6.1 km	MPC · JPL
405486	2004 XU_{18}	—	December 8, 2004	Socorro	LINEAR	·	810 m	MPC · JPL
405487	2004 XH_{67}	—	December 3, 2004	Kitt Peak	Spacewatch	·	2.8 km	MPC · JPL
405488	2004 XZ_{68}	—	November 3, 2004	Kitt Peak	Spacewatch	·	890 m	MPC · JPL
405489	2004 XZ_{91}	—	December 11, 2004	Kitt Peak	Spacewatch	·	2.2 km	MPC · JPL
405490	2004 XR_{92}	—	November 4, 2004	Kitt Peak	Spacewatch	·	2.8 km	MPC · JPL
405491	2004 XF_{103}	—	December 14, 2004	Catalina	CSS	THB	4.2 km	MPC · JPL
405492	2004 XE_{104}	—	December 9, 2004	Kitt Peak	Spacewatch	·	2.8 km	MPC · JPL
405493	2004 XE_{108}	—	December 11, 2004	Socorro	LINEAR	·	4.2 km	MPC · JPL
405494	2004 XY_{150}	—	December 2, 2004	Kitt Peak	Spacewatch	·	820 m	MPC · JPL
405495	2004 XP_{154}	—	December 15, 2004	Kitt Peak	Spacewatch	·	3.5 km	MPC · JPL
405496	2004 XL_{182}	—	December 1, 2004	Catalina	CSS	·	1.4 km	MPC · JPL
405497	2004 XS_{191}	—	December 11, 2004	Catalina	CSS	·	1.9 km	MPC · JPL
405498	2004 XQ_{192}	—	December 2, 2004	Kitt Peak	Spacewatch	·	2.4 km	MPC · JPL
405499	2005 AR_{12}	—	January 6, 2005	Socorro	LINEAR	NYS	1.2 km	MPC · JPL
405500	2005 AY_{23}	—	January 7, 2005	Kitt Peak	Spacewatch	NYS	770 m	MPC · JPL

== 405501–405600 ==
back to top

Designation			Discovery			Properties		Ref
Permanent	Provisional	Named after	Date	Site	Discoverer(s)	Category	Diam.	Ref
405501	2005 AH_{32}	—	January 11, 2005	Socorro	LINEAR	·	2.6 km	MPC · JPL
405502	2005 AY_{39}	—	January 15, 2005	Anderson Mesa	LONEOS	TIR	3.0 km	MPC · JPL
405503	2005 AW_{40}	—	January 15, 2005	Socorro	LINEAR	·	1.3 km	MPC · JPL
405504	2005 AN_{47}	—	January 13, 2005	Kitt Peak	Spacewatch	·	3.0 km	MPC · JPL
405505	2005 AO_{61}	—	January 15, 2005	Kitt Peak	Spacewatch	·	1.4 km	MPC · JPL
405506	2005 AB_{65}	—	January 13, 2005	Kitt Peak	Spacewatch	·	1.1 km	MPC · JPL
405507	2005 AT_{68}	—	January 13, 2005	Kitt Peak	Spacewatch	·	1.4 km	MPC · JPL
405508	2005 BG_{2}	—	January 16, 2005	Anderson Mesa	LONEOS	·	1.5 km	MPC · JPL
405509	2005 BT_{7}	—	January 16, 2005	Socorro	LINEAR	·	3.5 km	MPC · JPL
405510	2005 BD_{18}	—	January 16, 2005	Socorro	LINEAR	·	2.2 km	MPC · JPL
405511	2005 BO_{49}	—	January 17, 2005	Catalina	CSS	H	640 m	MPC · JPL
405512	2005 CF_{7}	—	December 21, 2004	Catalina	CSS	H	750 m	MPC · JPL
405513	2005 CM_{27}	—	February 2, 2005	Socorro	LINEAR	·	3.5 km	MPC · JPL
405514	2005 CR_{40}	—	February 9, 2005	La Silla	A. Boattini, H. Scholl	·	1.2 km	MPC · JPL
405515	2005 CD_{44}	—	February 2, 2005	Kitt Peak	Spacewatch	NYS	1.2 km	MPC · JPL
405516	2005 CL_{49}	—	February 2, 2005	Catalina	CSS	PHO	1.2 km	MPC · JPL
405517	2005 CQ_{61}	—	February 9, 2005	Kitt Peak	Spacewatch	H	650 m	MPC · JPL
405518	2005 CJ_{67}	—	February 15, 2005	Gnosca	S. Sposetti	·	2.9 km	MPC · JPL
405519	2005 CS_{80}	—	February 1, 2005	Catalina	CSS	·	5.3 km	MPC · JPL
405520	2005 EA_{1}	—	March 1, 2005	Kitt Peak	Spacewatch	·	1.2 km	MPC · JPL
405521	2005 EQ_{30}	—	March 3, 2005	Kitt Peak	Spacewatch	H	720 m	MPC · JPL
405522	2005 EM_{53}	—	March 4, 2005	Kitt Peak	Spacewatch	·	1.2 km	MPC · JPL
405523	2005 EG_{60}	—	March 4, 2005	Catalina	CSS	·	1.2 km	MPC · JPL
405524	2005 EC_{65}	—	March 4, 2005	Socorro	LINEAR	LIX	3.7 km	MPC · JPL
405525	2005 EA_{70}	—	March 8, 2005	Socorro	LINEAR	H	780 m	MPC · JPL
405526	2005 EY_{104}	—	March 4, 2005	Mount Lemmon	Mount Lemmon Survey	·	1.0 km	MPC · JPL
405527	2005 EH_{130}	—	March 9, 2005	Mount Lemmon	Mount Lemmon Survey	H	490 m	MPC · JPL
405528	2005 EZ_{131}	—	March 9, 2005	Catalina	CSS	PHO	1.1 km	MPC · JPL
405529	2005 EQ_{141}	—	February 14, 2005	Kitt Peak	Spacewatch	·	1.0 km	MPC · JPL
405530	2005 EM_{159}	—	March 9, 2005	Mount Lemmon	Mount Lemmon Survey	·	2.3 km	MPC · JPL
405531	2005 EK_{168}	—	March 11, 2005	Mount Lemmon	Mount Lemmon Survey	·	1.3 km	MPC · JPL
405532	2005 EE_{172}	—	March 7, 2005	Socorro	LINEAR	T_{j} (2.99)	3.3 km	MPC · JPL
405533	2005 EM_{256}	—	March 11, 2005	Mount Lemmon	Mount Lemmon Survey	NYS	1.1 km	MPC · JPL
405534	2005 EN_{295}	—	March 15, 2005	Catalina	CSS	T_{j} (2.98)	3.4 km	MPC · JPL
405535	2005 EN_{310}	—	March 10, 2005	Mount Lemmon	Mount Lemmon Survey	·	1.1 km	MPC · JPL
405536	2005 EZ_{311}	—	March 10, 2005	Mount Lemmon	Mount Lemmon Survey	·	990 m	MPC · JPL
405537	2005 EQ_{328}	—	March 4, 2005	Mount Lemmon	Mount Lemmon Survey	·	690 m	MPC · JPL
405538	2005 GR_{3}	—	April 1, 2005	Kitt Peak	Spacewatch	·	880 m	MPC · JPL
405539	2005 GY_{28}	—	April 4, 2005	Kitt Peak	Spacewatch	·	1.5 km	MPC · JPL
405540	2005 GR_{38}	—	April 4, 2005	Kitt Peak	Spacewatch	·	940 m	MPC · JPL
405541	2005 GM_{44}	—	April 5, 2005	Palomar	NEAT	NYS	1.4 km	MPC · JPL
405542	2005 GE_{49}	—	April 5, 2005	Mount Lemmon	Mount Lemmon Survey	·	940 m	MPC · JPL
405543	2005 GN_{97}	—	April 7, 2005	Kitt Peak	Spacewatch	·	1.4 km	MPC · JPL
405544	2005 GH_{99}	—	April 7, 2005	Kitt Peak	Spacewatch	NYS	1.0 km	MPC · JPL
405545	2005 GN_{209}	—	April 6, 2005	Catalina	CSS	·	1.3 km	MPC · JPL
405546	2005 JU_{21}	—	May 6, 2005	Catalina	CSS	·	1.2 km	MPC · JPL
405547	2005 JV_{35}	—	May 4, 2005	Kitt Peak	Spacewatch	·	1.3 km	MPC · JPL
405548	2005 JH_{65}	—	April 11, 2005	Kitt Peak	Spacewatch	·	1.2 km	MPC · JPL
405549	2005 JO_{121}	—	May 10, 2005	Kitt Peak	Spacewatch	·	1.5 km	MPC · JPL
405550	2005 JM_{133}	—	May 14, 2005	Kitt Peak	Spacewatch	·	1.2 km	MPC · JPL
405551	2005 JM_{166}	—	May 11, 2005	Palomar	NEAT	·	3.1 km	MPC · JPL
405552	2005 KF_{5}	—	May 18, 2005	Palomar	NEAT	EUN	1.2 km	MPC · JPL
405553	2005 LP_{5}	—	June 2, 2005	Siding Spring	SSS	·	1.7 km	MPC · JPL
405554	2005 LB_{7}	—	June 1, 2005	Kitt Peak	Spacewatch	slow	1.5 km	MPC · JPL
405555	2005 LQ_{14}	—	May 20, 2005	Mount Lemmon	Mount Lemmon Survey	·	1.4 km	MPC · JPL
405556	2005 ML_{48}	—	May 14, 2005	Mount Lemmon	Mount Lemmon Survey	·	2.1 km	MPC · JPL
405557	2005 NF_{15}	—	July 2, 2005	Kitt Peak	Spacewatch	·	1.9 km	MPC · JPL
405558	2005 NP_{43}	—	July 6, 2005	Kitt Peak	Spacewatch	·	1.7 km	MPC · JPL
405559	2005 NU_{55}	—	July 4, 2005	Catalina	CSS	·	1.8 km	MPC · JPL
405560	2005 NP_{118}	—	July 7, 2005	Mauna Kea	Veillet, C.	·	1.4 km	MPC · JPL
405561	2005 NQ_{123}	—	July 10, 2005	Siding Spring	SSS	·	1.8 km	MPC · JPL
405562	2005 OJ_{3}	—	July 30, 2005	Campo Imperatore	CINEOS	AMO +1km	810 m	MPC · JPL
405563	2005 OC_{9}	—	July 26, 2005	Palomar	NEAT	·	1.2 km	MPC · JPL
405564	2005 ON_{27}	—	July 31, 2005	Palomar	NEAT	·	1.8 km	MPC · JPL
405565	2005 QF_{11}	—	August 27, 2005	Pla D'Arguines	R. Ferrando	·	1.3 km	MPC · JPL
405566	2005 QC_{19}	—	August 25, 2005	Campo Imperatore	CINEOS	EUN	1.3 km	MPC · JPL
405567	2005 QQ_{50}	—	August 26, 2005	Palomar	NEAT	·	1.9 km	MPC · JPL
405568	2005 QB_{60}	—	August 26, 2005	Campo Imperatore	CINEOS	·	2.9 km	MPC · JPL
405569	2005 QR_{65}	—	August 27, 2005	Anderson Mesa	LONEOS	·	1.8 km	MPC · JPL
405570	2005 QR_{67}	—	August 28, 2005	Kitt Peak	Spacewatch	AEO	860 m	MPC · JPL
405571 Erdőspál	2005 QE_{87}	Erdőspál	August 31, 2005	Piszkéstető	K. Sárneczky, Z. Kuli	·	560 m	MPC · JPL
405572	2005 QR_{93}	—	August 26, 2005	Palomar	NEAT	DOR	2.7 km	MPC · JPL
405573	2005 QW_{122}	—	August 28, 2005	Kitt Peak	Spacewatch	·	1.9 km	MPC · JPL
405574	2005 QB_{124}	—	August 28, 2005	Kitt Peak	Spacewatch	AGN	870 m	MPC · JPL
405575	2005 QY_{128}	—	August 28, 2005	Kitt Peak	Spacewatch	NEM	2.1 km	MPC · JPL
405576	2005 QY_{134}	—	August 28, 2005	Kitt Peak	Spacewatch	·	1.6 km	MPC · JPL
405577	2005 QM_{135}	—	August 28, 2005	Kitt Peak	Spacewatch	·	1.5 km	MPC · JPL
405578	2005 QB_{140}	—	August 28, 2005	Kitt Peak	Spacewatch	·	1.7 km	MPC · JPL
405579	2005 QY_{142}	—	August 31, 2005	Kitt Peak	Spacewatch	·	1.5 km	MPC · JPL
405580	2005 QZ_{173}	—	August 31, 2005	Kitt Peak	Spacewatch	·	1.9 km	MPC · JPL
405581	2005 QT_{189}	—	August 29, 2005	Kitt Peak	Spacewatch	AEO	910 m	MPC · JPL
405582	2005 RK_{13}	—	September 1, 2005	Palomar	NEAT	·	1.6 km	MPC · JPL
405583	2005 RZ_{44}	—	September 3, 2005	Palomar	NEAT	TIN	1.2 km	MPC · JPL
405584	2005 RJ_{48}	—	September 1, 2005	Palomar	NEAT	·	1.9 km	MPC · JPL
405585	2005 SF_{9}	—	August 8, 2005	Siding Spring	SSS	·	2.2 km	MPC · JPL
405586	2005 ST_{13}	—	September 24, 2005	Kitt Peak	Spacewatch	MRX	1.1 km	MPC · JPL
405587	2005 SY_{14}	—	September 26, 2005	Kitt Peak	Spacewatch	·	1.4 km	MPC · JPL
405588	2005 SM_{29}	—	September 23, 2005	Kitt Peak	Spacewatch	·	2.3 km	MPC · JPL
405589	2005 SL_{30}	—	September 1, 2005	Kitt Peak	Spacewatch	·	2.3 km	MPC · JPL
405590	2005 SE_{45}	—	September 24, 2005	Kitt Peak	Spacewatch	·	650 m	MPC · JPL
405591	2005 SK_{46}	—	September 24, 2005	Kitt Peak	Spacewatch	·	2.2 km	MPC · JPL
405592	2005 SV_{46}	—	September 24, 2005	Kitt Peak	Spacewatch	·	1.8 km	MPC · JPL
405593	2005 SM_{55}	—	September 25, 2005	Kitt Peak	Spacewatch	·	2.1 km	MPC · JPL
405594	2005 SH_{61}	—	September 26, 2005	Kitt Peak	Spacewatch	·	1.7 km	MPC · JPL
405595	2005 SJ_{74}	—	September 14, 2005	Kitt Peak	Spacewatch	·	1.4 km	MPC · JPL
405596	2005 SE_{79}	—	September 24, 2005	Kitt Peak	Spacewatch	AGN	1.2 km	MPC · JPL
405597	2005 SR_{80}	—	September 24, 2005	Kitt Peak	Spacewatch	·	1.7 km	MPC · JPL
405598	2005 SF_{86}	—	September 24, 2005	Kitt Peak	Spacewatch	·	2.4 km	MPC · JPL
405599	2005 SD_{94}	—	September 11, 2005	Kitt Peak	Spacewatch	·	1.6 km	MPC · JPL
405600	2005 SC_{102}	—	September 25, 2005	Kitt Peak	Spacewatch	·	2.2 km	MPC · JPL

== 405601–405700 ==
back to top

Designation			Discovery			Properties		Ref
Permanent	Provisional	Named after	Date	Site	Discoverer(s)	Category	Diam.	Ref
405601	2005 SS_{106}	—	September 26, 2005	Kitt Peak	Spacewatch	·	1.9 km	MPC · JPL
405602	2005 SU_{108}	—	September 26, 2005	Kitt Peak	Spacewatch	·	2.1 km	MPC · JPL
405603	2005 SD_{114}	—	September 27, 2005	Kitt Peak	Spacewatch	·	1.7 km	MPC · JPL
405604	2005 SV_{116}	—	August 29, 2005	Kitt Peak	Spacewatch	·	1.9 km	MPC · JPL
405605	2005 SZ_{131}	—	September 29, 2005	Kitt Peak	Spacewatch	AGN	1.2 km	MPC · JPL
405606	2005 SK_{141}	—	September 25, 2005	Kitt Peak	Spacewatch	·	1.7 km	MPC · JPL
405607	2005 SA_{145}	—	September 25, 2005	Kitt Peak	Spacewatch	MRX	770 m	MPC · JPL
405608	2005 SG_{159}	—	September 26, 2005	Kitt Peak	Spacewatch	·	2.6 km	MPC · JPL
405609	2005 SN_{166}	—	September 28, 2005	Palomar	NEAT	·	2.7 km	MPC · JPL
405610	2005 SL_{167}	—	September 28, 2005	Palomar	NEAT	·	2.4 km	MPC · JPL
405611	2005 SN_{171}	—	September 29, 2005	Kitt Peak	Spacewatch	·	1.7 km	MPC · JPL
405612	2005 SF_{176}	—	September 29, 2005	Kitt Peak	Spacewatch	·	1.6 km	MPC · JPL
405613	2005 SH_{177}	—	September 29, 2005	Kitt Peak	Spacewatch	·	1.6 km	MPC · JPL
405614	2005 SP_{177}	—	September 29, 2005	Kitt Peak	Spacewatch	·	1.8 km	MPC · JPL
405615	2005 SC_{185}	—	September 29, 2005	Kitt Peak	Spacewatch	·	1.9 km	MPC · JPL
405616	2005 SK_{185}	—	September 29, 2005	Kitt Peak	Spacewatch	AGN	820 m	MPC · JPL
405617	2005 SH_{188}	—	September 29, 2005	Mount Lemmon	Mount Lemmon Survey	KOR	1.2 km	MPC · JPL
405618	2005 SY_{198}	—	September 30, 2005	Kitt Peak	Spacewatch	·	1.9 km	MPC · JPL
405619	2005 SU_{200}	—	September 30, 2005	Kitt Peak	Spacewatch	(13314)	1.8 km	MPC · JPL
405620	2005 SQ_{215}	—	September 30, 2005	Catalina	CSS	·	2.1 km	MPC · JPL
405621	2005 SH_{218}	—	September 30, 2005	Palomar	NEAT	·	2.0 km	MPC · JPL
405622	2005 SC_{228}	—	September 24, 2005	Kitt Peak	Spacewatch	·	2.0 km	MPC · JPL
405623	2005 SP_{228}	—	September 13, 2005	Kitt Peak	Spacewatch	·	1.7 km	MPC · JPL
405624	2005 ST_{230}	—	September 30, 2005	Mount Lemmon	Mount Lemmon Survey	GEF	960 m	MPC · JPL
405625	2005 SM_{267}	—	August 29, 2005	Anderson Mesa	LONEOS	·	1.9 km	MPC · JPL
405626	2005 SS_{271}	—	September 26, 2005	Kitt Peak	Spacewatch	·	1.6 km	MPC · JPL
405627	2005 SL_{275}	—	September 29, 2005	Kitt Peak	Spacewatch	HOF	2.4 km	MPC · JPL
405628	2005 SW_{280}	—	September 29, 2005	Catalina	CSS	·	2.3 km	MPC · JPL
405629	2005 TG_{5}	—	October 1, 2005	Catalina	CSS	·	2.6 km	MPC · JPL
405630	2005 TX_{7}	—	October 1, 2005	Kitt Peak	Spacewatch	KOR	1.0 km	MPC · JPL
405631	2005 TS_{8}	—	October 1, 2005	Kitt Peak	Spacewatch	·	2.1 km	MPC · JPL
405632	2005 TZ_{9}	—	October 2, 2005	Palomar	NEAT	·	2.1 km	MPC · JPL
405633	2005 TC_{28}	—	October 1, 2005	Kitt Peak	Spacewatch	·	2.8 km	MPC · JPL
405634	2005 TB_{37}	—	September 14, 2005	Kitt Peak	Spacewatch	HOF	2.4 km	MPC · JPL
405635	2005 TF_{39}	—	October 1, 2005	Mount Lemmon	Mount Lemmon Survey	·	2.2 km	MPC · JPL
405636	2005 TE_{41}	—	September 25, 2005	Kitt Peak	Spacewatch	HOF	2.5 km	MPC · JPL
405637	2005 TY_{43}	—	October 3, 2005	Catalina	CSS	·	2.3 km	MPC · JPL
405638	2005 TR_{66}	—	October 5, 2005	Mount Lemmon	Mount Lemmon Survey	·	1.4 km	MPC · JPL
405639	2005 TO_{67}	—	October 5, 2005	Mount Lemmon	Mount Lemmon Survey	·	1.4 km	MPC · JPL
405640	2005 TY_{90}	—	September 23, 2005	Kitt Peak	Spacewatch	·	1.6 km	MPC · JPL
405641	2005 TK_{91}	—	September 23, 2005	Kitt Peak	Spacewatch	AGN	1.1 km	MPC · JPL
405642	2005 TT_{92}	—	September 25, 2005	Kitt Peak	Spacewatch	·	1.8 km	MPC · JPL
405643	2005 TJ_{98}	—	October 6, 2005	Anderson Mesa	LONEOS	·	2.1 km	MPC · JPL
405644	2005 TW_{100}	—	October 1, 2005	Catalina	CSS	HOF	2.8 km	MPC · JPL
405645	2005 TF_{113}	—	October 7, 2005	Kitt Peak	Spacewatch	·	1.8 km	MPC · JPL
405646	2005 TF_{115}	—	October 7, 2005	Kitt Peak	Spacewatch	AGN	1.1 km	MPC · JPL
405647	2005 TE_{125}	—	September 26, 2005	Kitt Peak	Spacewatch	·	2.1 km	MPC · JPL
405648	2005 TY_{132}	—	October 7, 2005	Kitt Peak	Spacewatch	·	3.7 km	MPC · JPL
405649	2005 TU_{138}	—	October 8, 2005	Kitt Peak	Spacewatch	·	2.0 km	MPC · JPL
405650	2005 TP_{142}	—	October 8, 2005	Kitt Peak	Spacewatch	·	1.8 km	MPC · JPL
405651	2005 TE_{157}	—	October 9, 2005	Kitt Peak	Spacewatch	AGN	1.1 km	MPC · JPL
405652	2005 TS_{162}	—	October 9, 2005	Kitt Peak	Spacewatch	·	1.8 km	MPC · JPL
405653	2005 TL_{197}	—	October 11, 2005	Anderson Mesa	LONEOS	·	3.0 km	MPC · JPL
405654	2005 UP_{26}	—	October 23, 2005	Kitt Peak	Spacewatch	·	2.2 km	MPC · JPL
405655	2005 UB_{29}	—	October 23, 2005	Catalina	CSS	·	2.1 km	MPC · JPL
405656	2005 UU_{66}	—	October 22, 2005	Palomar	NEAT	·	2.2 km	MPC · JPL
405657	2005 UY_{69}	—	October 23, 2005	Catalina	CSS	·	2.0 km	MPC · JPL
405658	2005 UR_{76}	—	September 15, 2005	Socorro	LINEAR	·	2.7 km	MPC · JPL
405659	2005 US_{85}	—	October 7, 2005	Catalina	CSS	·	2.6 km	MPC · JPL
405660	2005 UJ_{97}	—	October 22, 2005	Kitt Peak	Spacewatch	·	2.0 km	MPC · JPL
405661	2005 UR_{105}	—	October 22, 2005	Kitt Peak	Spacewatch	·	2.1 km	MPC · JPL
405662	2005 UR_{111}	—	October 22, 2005	Kitt Peak	Spacewatch	GEF	1.5 km	MPC · JPL
405663	2005 UQ_{125}	—	October 24, 2005	Kitt Peak	Spacewatch	·	1.9 km	MPC · JPL
405664	2005 UE_{140}	—	September 30, 2005	Mount Lemmon	Mount Lemmon Survey	·	980 m	MPC · JPL
405665	2005 UX_{156}	—	October 24, 2005	Kitt Peak	Spacewatch	·	1.9 km	MPC · JPL
405666	2005 UC_{158}	—	October 5, 2005	Kitt Peak	Spacewatch	AGN	1.1 km	MPC · JPL
405667	2005 UW_{170}	—	October 24, 2005	Kitt Peak	Spacewatch	KOR	1.1 km	MPC · JPL
405668	2005 UH_{171}	—	October 24, 2005	Kitt Peak	Spacewatch	·	2.5 km	MPC · JPL
405669	2005 UT_{185}	—	October 25, 2005	Mount Lemmon	Mount Lemmon Survey	·	2.6 km	MPC · JPL
405670	2005 UC_{187}	—	October 26, 2005	Kitt Peak	Spacewatch	·	2.1 km	MPC · JPL
405671	2005 UP_{187}	—	September 29, 2005	Mount Lemmon	Mount Lemmon Survey	·	1.7 km	MPC · JPL
405672	2005 UR_{189}	—	October 27, 2005	Mount Lemmon	Mount Lemmon Survey	KOR	1.2 km	MPC · JPL
405673	2005 UX_{189}	—	October 27, 2005	Mount Lemmon	Mount Lemmon Survey	·	1.8 km	MPC · JPL
405674	2005 UN_{192}	—	October 27, 2005	Kitt Peak	Spacewatch	KOR	1.2 km	MPC · JPL
405675	2005 UF_{200}	—	October 25, 2005	Kitt Peak	Spacewatch	·	1.7 km	MPC · JPL
405676	2005 UE_{212}	—	October 27, 2005	Kitt Peak	Spacewatch	·	1.3 km	MPC · JPL
405677	2005 UZ_{220}	—	October 25, 2005	Kitt Peak	Spacewatch	HOF	3.0 km	MPC · JPL
405678	2005 UL_{227}	—	October 1, 2005	Mount Lemmon	Mount Lemmon Survey	AGN	1.2 km	MPC · JPL
405679	2005 US_{227}	—	October 25, 2005	Kitt Peak	Spacewatch	·	1.8 km	MPC · JPL
405680	2005 UY_{240}	—	October 25, 2005	Kitt Peak	Spacewatch	·	2.0 km	MPC · JPL
405681	2005 UU_{247}	—	September 29, 2005	Mount Lemmon	Mount Lemmon Survey	HOF	2.5 km	MPC · JPL
405682	2005 UX_{250}	—	October 23, 2005	Catalina	CSS	·	2.5 km	MPC · JPL
405683	2005 UE_{269}	—	September 25, 2005	Kitt Peak	Spacewatch	·	2.1 km	MPC · JPL
405684	2005 UG_{279}	—	October 24, 2005	Kitt Peak	Spacewatch	·	1.7 km	MPC · JPL
405685	2005 UR_{286}	—	October 26, 2005	Kitt Peak	Spacewatch	·	1.8 km	MPC · JPL
405686	2005 UX_{305}	—	October 27, 2005	Mount Lemmon	Mount Lemmon Survey	KOR	1.1 km	MPC · JPL
405687	2005 UH_{306}	—	October 27, 2005	Mount Lemmon	Mount Lemmon Survey	·	2.1 km	MPC · JPL
405688	2005 UU_{319}	—	October 27, 2005	Kitt Peak	Spacewatch	KOR	1.2 km	MPC · JPL
405689	2005 UA_{320}	—	October 27, 2005	Kitt Peak	Spacewatch	·	1.9 km	MPC · JPL
405690	2005 UB_{323}	—	October 22, 2005	Kitt Peak	Spacewatch	·	2.1 km	MPC · JPL
405691	2005 UK_{327}	—	October 29, 2005	Kitt Peak	Spacewatch	·	1.9 km	MPC · JPL
405692	2005 UH_{338}	—	October 1, 2005	Mount Lemmon	Mount Lemmon Survey	·	1.6 km	MPC · JPL
405693	2005 UX_{344}	—	October 29, 2005	Mount Lemmon	Mount Lemmon Survey	·	1.7 km	MPC · JPL
405694	2005 UO_{362}	—	October 27, 2005	Kitt Peak	Spacewatch	NAE	2.5 km	MPC · JPL
405695	2005 UU_{366}	—	October 22, 2005	Kitt Peak	Spacewatch	·	2.6 km	MPC · JPL
405696	2005 UG_{388}	—	October 26, 2005	Kitt Peak	Spacewatch	KOR	1.2 km	MPC · JPL
405697	2005 UH_{398}	—	October 30, 2005	Socorro	LINEAR	·	1.8 km	MPC · JPL
405698	2005 UO_{418}	—	October 7, 2005	Mount Lemmon	Mount Lemmon Survey	KOR	1.1 km	MPC · JPL
405699	2005 UC_{491}	—	October 10, 2005	Catalina	CSS	BRA	1.5 km	MPC · JPL
405700	2005 UG_{500}	—	October 27, 2005	Anderson Mesa	LONEOS	·	1.8 km	MPC · JPL

== 405701–405800 ==
back to top

Designation			Discovery			Properties		Ref
Permanent	Provisional	Named after	Date	Site	Discoverer(s)	Category	Diam.	Ref
405701	2005 UX_{514}	—	October 22, 2005	Apache Point	A. C. Becker	AGN	940 m	MPC · JPL
405702	2005 UV_{521}	—	October 26, 2005	Apache Point	A. C. Becker	AGN	980 m	MPC · JPL
405703	2005 UZ_{527}	—	September 30, 2005	Mount Lemmon	Mount Lemmon Survey	KOR	990 m	MPC · JPL
405704	2005 VV_{59}	—	October 25, 2005	Kitt Peak	Spacewatch	·	2.1 km	MPC · JPL
405705	2005 VH_{64}	—	November 1, 2005	Mount Lemmon	Mount Lemmon Survey	HOF	2.4 km	MPC · JPL
405706	2005 VK_{65}	—	November 1, 2005	Mount Lemmon	Mount Lemmon Survey	HOF	2.9 km	MPC · JPL
405707	2005 VZ_{65}	—	November 1, 2005	Mount Lemmon	Mount Lemmon Survey	·	1.5 km	MPC · JPL
405708	2005 VX_{86}	—	October 28, 2005	Mount Lemmon	Mount Lemmon Survey	·	3.4 km	MPC · JPL
405709	2005 VR_{91}	—	October 28, 2005	Mount Lemmon	Mount Lemmon Survey	KOR	1.1 km	MPC · JPL
405710	2005 VA_{131}	—	November 1, 2005	Apache Point	A. C. Becker	·	1.9 km	MPC · JPL
405711	2005 VN_{135}	—	November 12, 2005	Kitt Peak	Spacewatch	·	1.4 km	MPC · JPL
405712	2005 WJ_{28}	—	November 21, 2005	Kitt Peak	Spacewatch	KOR	1.3 km	MPC · JPL
405713	2005 WK_{35}	—	November 22, 2005	Kitt Peak	Spacewatch	·	2.4 km	MPC · JPL
405714	2005 WO_{36}	—	November 22, 2005	Kitt Peak	Spacewatch	·	1.7 km	MPC · JPL
405715	2005 WU_{39}	—	November 25, 2005	Mount Lemmon	Mount Lemmon Survey	·	1.8 km	MPC · JPL
405716	2005 WR_{42}	—	November 21, 2005	Kitt Peak	Spacewatch	KOR	1.3 km	MPC · JPL
405717	2005 WB_{66}	—	November 5, 2005	Kitt Peak	Spacewatch	·	1.7 km	MPC · JPL
405718	2005 WK_{79}	—	November 25, 2005	Kitt Peak	Spacewatch	KOR	1.3 km	MPC · JPL
405719	2005 WR_{103}	—	October 31, 2005	Catalina	CSS	·	2.5 km	MPC · JPL
405720	2005 WT_{114}	—	November 28, 2005	Catalina	CSS	·	2.2 km	MPC · JPL
405721	2005 WR_{143}	—	November 22, 2005	Kitt Peak	Spacewatch	·	2.0 km	MPC · JPL
405722	2005 WV_{157}	—	October 30, 2005	Mount Lemmon	Mount Lemmon Survey	·	2.9 km	MPC · JPL
405723	2005 WF_{163}	—	November 29, 2005	Kitt Peak	Spacewatch	·	1.9 km	MPC · JPL
405724	2005 WJ_{172}	—	November 4, 2005	Kitt Peak	Spacewatch	KOR	1.4 km	MPC · JPL
405725	2005 WC_{211}	—	November 29, 2005	Kitt Peak	Spacewatch	BRA	2.0 km	MPC · JPL
405726	2005 XJ	—	December 1, 2005	Junk Bond	D. Healy	KOR	1.5 km	MPC · JPL
405727	2005 XS_{23}	—	December 2, 2005	Socorro	LINEAR	DOR	2.8 km	MPC · JPL
405728	2005 XQ_{25}	—	December 4, 2005	Mount Lemmon	Mount Lemmon Survey	·	560 m	MPC · JPL
405729	2005 XN_{40}	—	December 5, 2005	Mount Lemmon	Mount Lemmon Survey	·	710 m	MPC · JPL
405730	2005 XM_{64}	—	December 6, 2005	Kitt Peak	Spacewatch	·	3.6 km	MPC · JPL
405731	2005 YS_{7}	—	December 22, 2005	Kitt Peak	Spacewatch	·	560 m	MPC · JPL
405732	2005 YQ_{12}	—	December 21, 2005	Kitt Peak	Spacewatch	KOR	2.0 km	MPC · JPL
405733	2005 YR_{13}	—	October 27, 2005	Mount Lemmon	Mount Lemmon Survey	EOS	2.1 km	MPC · JPL
405734	2005 YA_{15}	—	November 6, 2005	Mount Lemmon	Mount Lemmon Survey	·	1.2 km	MPC · JPL
405735	2005 YR_{22}	—	December 24, 2005	Kitt Peak	Spacewatch	·	2.5 km	MPC · JPL
405736	2005 YV_{25}	—	December 24, 2005	Kitt Peak	Spacewatch	·	2.4 km	MPC · JPL
405737	2005 YD_{26}	—	December 24, 2005	Kitt Peak	Spacewatch	URS	3.8 km	MPC · JPL
405738	2005 YT_{30}	—	December 22, 2005	Kitt Peak	Spacewatch	·	2.1 km	MPC · JPL
405739	2005 YT_{33}	—	November 30, 2005	Mount Lemmon	Mount Lemmon Survey	·	2.5 km	MPC · JPL
405740	2005 YT_{39}	—	December 22, 2005	Kitt Peak	Spacewatch	·	2.7 km	MPC · JPL
405741	2005 YV_{40}	—	December 25, 2005	Mount Lemmon	Mount Lemmon Survey	EOS	2.3 km	MPC · JPL
405742	2005 YD_{58}	—	December 24, 2005	Kitt Peak	Spacewatch	EOS	2.0 km	MPC · JPL
405743	2005 YV_{67}	—	December 5, 2005	Mount Lemmon	Mount Lemmon Survey	EOS	2.3 km	MPC · JPL
405744	2005 YA_{70}	—	October 1, 2005	Mount Lemmon	Mount Lemmon Survey	EOS	2.1 km	MPC · JPL
405745	2005 YW_{77}	—	December 24, 2005	Kitt Peak	Spacewatch	·	700 m	MPC · JPL
405746	2005 YF_{81}	—	December 4, 2005	Mount Lemmon	Mount Lemmon Survey	·	2.5 km	MPC · JPL
405747	2005 YT_{105}	—	December 25, 2005	Kitt Peak	Spacewatch	·	700 m	MPC · JPL
405748	2005 YE_{106}	—	December 25, 2005	Mount Lemmon	Mount Lemmon Survey	EOS	2.3 km	MPC · JPL
405749	2005 YX_{107}	—	December 4, 2005	Mount Lemmon	Mount Lemmon Survey	EOS	1.9 km	MPC · JPL
405750	2005 YJ_{109}	—	December 25, 2005	Kitt Peak	Spacewatch	KOR	1.3 km	MPC · JPL
405751	2005 YX_{117}	—	December 25, 2005	Kitt Peak	Spacewatch	·	2.1 km	MPC · JPL
405752	2005 YT_{122}	—	December 24, 2005	Socorro	LINEAR	·	2.4 km	MPC · JPL
405753	2005 YF_{127}	—	October 30, 2005	Mount Lemmon	Mount Lemmon Survey	·	2.6 km	MPC · JPL
405754	2005 YK_{129}	—	December 24, 2005	Kitt Peak	Spacewatch	·	3.4 km	MPC · JPL
405755	2005 YC_{133}	—	December 26, 2005	Kitt Peak	Spacewatch	·	3.0 km	MPC · JPL
405756	2005 YK_{133}	—	December 26, 2005	Kitt Peak	Spacewatch	·	710 m	MPC · JPL
405757	2005 YK_{138}	—	December 26, 2005	Kitt Peak	Spacewatch	·	650 m	MPC · JPL
405758	2005 YO_{148}	—	December 25, 2005	Kitt Peak	Spacewatch	·	2.0 km	MPC · JPL
405759	2005 YJ_{149}	—	December 25, 2005	Kitt Peak	Spacewatch	·	860 m	MPC · JPL
405760	2005 YN_{151}	—	December 25, 2005	Kitt Peak	Spacewatch	·	950 m	MPC · JPL
405761	2005 YD_{152}	—	December 27, 2005	Mount Lemmon	Mount Lemmon Survey	·	800 m	MPC · JPL
405762	2005 YO_{180}	—	December 29, 2005	Mauna Kea	D. J. Tholen	APO · PHA	310 m	MPC · JPL
405763	2005 YS_{183}	—	December 27, 2005	Kitt Peak	Spacewatch	·	840 m	MPC · JPL
405764	2005 YF_{184}	—	December 27, 2005	Kitt Peak	Spacewatch	EOS	2.0 km	MPC · JPL
405765	2005 YW_{185}	—	December 30, 2005	Kitt Peak	Spacewatch	·	520 m	MPC · JPL
405766	2005 YW_{189}	—	December 30, 2005	Kitt Peak	Spacewatch	·	920 m	MPC · JPL
405767	2005 YA_{203}	—	December 25, 2005	Kitt Peak	Spacewatch	·	430 m	MPC · JPL
405768	2005 YP_{218}	—	December 30, 2005	Mount Lemmon	Mount Lemmon Survey	·	3.3 km	MPC · JPL
405769	2005 YY_{223}	—	December 24, 2005	Kitt Peak	Spacewatch	·	1.6 km	MPC · JPL
405770	2005 YV_{224}	—	December 5, 2005	Kitt Peak	Spacewatch	·	3.3 km	MPC · JPL
405771	2005 YW_{228}	—	December 25, 2005	Mount Lemmon	Mount Lemmon Survey	·	3.0 km	MPC · JPL
405772	2005 YW_{239}	—	December 29, 2005	Kitt Peak	Spacewatch	EOS	2.2 km	MPC · JPL
405773	2005 YX_{252}	—	December 29, 2005	Kitt Peak	Spacewatch	EOS	2.4 km	MPC · JPL
405774	2005 YF_{275}	—	December 27, 2005	Mount Lemmon	Mount Lemmon Survey	·	4.7 km	MPC · JPL
405775	2005 YC_{281}	—	December 25, 2005	Kitt Peak	Spacewatch	EOS	2.2 km	MPC · JPL
405776	2006 AP	—	January 1, 2006	Catalina	CSS	·	1.2 km	MPC · JPL
405777	2006 AZ	—	January 2, 2006	Socorro	LINEAR	H	840 m	MPC · JPL
405778	2006 AM_{13}	—	December 21, 2005	Kitt Peak	Spacewatch	·	3.1 km	MPC · JPL
405779	2006 AB_{22}	—	January 5, 2006	Catalina	CSS	·	2.7 km	MPC · JPL
405780	2006 AZ_{34}	—	January 4, 2006	Kitt Peak	Spacewatch	·	1.9 km	MPC · JPL
405781	2006 AN_{35}	—	December 28, 2005	Kitt Peak	Spacewatch	·	2.8 km	MPC · JPL
405782	2006 AX_{35}	—	October 27, 2005	Mount Lemmon	Mount Lemmon Survey	·	2.4 km	MPC · JPL
405783	2006 AE_{43}	—	January 6, 2006	Kitt Peak	Spacewatch	EOS	2.0 km	MPC · JPL
405784	2006 AD_{44}	—	January 7, 2006	Anderson Mesa	LONEOS	·	2.0 km	MPC · JPL
405785	2006 AP_{48}	—	January 8, 2006	Mount Lemmon	Mount Lemmon Survey	·	690 m	MPC · JPL
405786	2006 AN_{53}	—	January 5, 2006	Kitt Peak	Spacewatch	·	1.7 km	MPC · JPL
405787	2006 AN_{58}	—	January 4, 2006	Kitt Peak	Spacewatch	·	2.8 km	MPC · JPL
405788	2006 AV_{64}	—	December 25, 2005	Kitt Peak	Spacewatch	·	950 m	MPC · JPL
405789	2006 AP_{66}	—	January 9, 2006	Kitt Peak	Spacewatch	·	690 m	MPC · JPL
405790	2006 AO_{68}	—	January 5, 2006	Mount Lemmon	Mount Lemmon Survey	·	2.5 km	MPC · JPL
405791	2006 AF_{72}	—	January 6, 2006	Kitt Peak	Spacewatch	·	2.9 km	MPC · JPL
405792	2006 AC_{73}	—	January 7, 2006	Mount Lemmon	Mount Lemmon Survey	VER	2.9 km	MPC · JPL
405793	2006 AU_{80}	—	January 7, 2006	Mount Lemmon	Mount Lemmon Survey	·	520 m	MPC · JPL
405794	2006 AS_{84}	—	January 6, 2006	Socorro	LINEAR	·	2.7 km	MPC · JPL
405795	2006 AT_{86}	—	January 7, 2006	Anderson Mesa	LONEOS	·	2.0 km	MPC · JPL
405796	2006 AX_{100}	—	January 9, 2006	Kitt Peak	Spacewatch	·	600 m	MPC · JPL
405797	2006 BG_{1}	—	January 7, 2006	Mount Lemmon	Mount Lemmon Survey	·	800 m	MPC · JPL
405798	2006 BQ_{22}	—	January 10, 2006	Mount Lemmon	Mount Lemmon Survey	(159)	3.0 km	MPC · JPL
405799	2006 BT_{30}	—	January 20, 2006	Kitt Peak	Spacewatch	·	2.3 km	MPC · JPL
405800	2006 BQ_{37}	—	January 7, 2006	Mount Lemmon	Mount Lemmon Survey	·	2.0 km	MPC · JPL

== 405801–405900 ==
back to top

Designation			Discovery			Properties		Ref
Permanent	Provisional	Named after	Date	Site	Discoverer(s)	Category	Diam.	Ref
405801	2006 BZ_{38}	—	November 6, 2005	Mount Lemmon	Mount Lemmon Survey	·	2.6 km	MPC · JPL
405802	2006 BY_{39}	—	January 20, 2006	Kitt Peak	Spacewatch	·	3.4 km	MPC · JPL
405803	2006 BS_{46}	—	January 23, 2006	Mount Lemmon	Mount Lemmon Survey	T_{j} (2.93)	4.8 km	MPC · JPL
405804	2006 BR_{48}	—	January 25, 2006	Kitt Peak	Spacewatch	·	3.1 km	MPC · JPL
405805	2006 BZ_{50}	—	January 25, 2006	Catalina	CSS	·	2.5 km	MPC · JPL
405806	2006 BT_{53}	—	January 25, 2006	Kitt Peak	Spacewatch	·	680 m	MPC · JPL
405807	2006 BQ_{54}	—	January 25, 2006	Kitt Peak	Spacewatch	·	690 m	MPC · JPL
405808	2006 BS_{57}	—	January 23, 2006	Kitt Peak	Spacewatch	·	3.3 km	MPC · JPL
405809	2006 BZ_{59}	—	January 25, 2006	Kitt Peak	Spacewatch	·	4.4 km	MPC · JPL
405810	2006 BL_{71}	—	January 23, 2006	Kitt Peak	Spacewatch	·	580 m	MPC · JPL
405811	2006 BQ_{72}	—	January 23, 2006	Kitt Peak	Spacewatch	·	2.5 km	MPC · JPL
405812	2006 BH_{75}	—	January 23, 2006	Kitt Peak	Spacewatch	VER	2.4 km	MPC · JPL
405813	2006 BC_{77}	—	January 23, 2006	Mount Lemmon	Mount Lemmon Survey	·	2.2 km	MPC · JPL
405814	2006 BL_{83}	—	January 8, 2006	Kitt Peak	Spacewatch	·	2.5 km	MPC · JPL
405815	2006 BN_{84}	—	December 24, 2005	Kitt Peak	Spacewatch	·	3.9 km	MPC · JPL
405816	2006 BV_{94}	—	January 26, 2006	Kitt Peak	Spacewatch	·	3.4 km	MPC · JPL
405817	2006 BQ_{100}	—	January 28, 2006	Catalina	CSS	EUP	3.6 km	MPC · JPL
405818	2006 BK_{101}	—	January 23, 2006	Mount Lemmon	Mount Lemmon Survey	·	2.9 km	MPC · JPL
405819	2006 BJ_{102}	—	January 23, 2006	Mount Lemmon	Mount Lemmon Survey	VER	2.5 km	MPC · JPL
405820	2006 BV_{113}	—	January 25, 2006	Kitt Peak	Spacewatch	·	700 m	MPC · JPL
405821	2006 BA_{114}	—	January 25, 2006	Kitt Peak	Spacewatch	·	2.7 km	MPC · JPL
405822	2006 BV_{123}	—	January 26, 2006	Kitt Peak	Spacewatch	·	960 m	MPC · JPL
405823	2006 BE_{126}	—	January 26, 2006	Kitt Peak	Spacewatch	NYS	840 m	MPC · JPL
405824	2006 BM_{136}	—	December 5, 2005	Mount Lemmon	Mount Lemmon Survey	·	1.7 km	MPC · JPL
405825	2006 BC_{137}	—	January 25, 2006	Kitt Peak	Spacewatch	THM	2.2 km	MPC · JPL
405826	2006 BW_{137}	—	January 28, 2006	Mount Lemmon	Mount Lemmon Survey	·	660 m	MPC · JPL
405827	2006 BM_{139}	—	January 28, 2006	Mount Lemmon	Mount Lemmon Survey	·	3.1 km	MPC · JPL
405828	2006 BX_{141}	—	January 26, 2006	Kitt Peak	Spacewatch	·	2.4 km	MPC · JPL
405829	2006 BJ_{143}	—	January 27, 2006	Mount Lemmon	Mount Lemmon Survey	·	820 m	MPC · JPL
405830	2006 BB_{145}	—	January 9, 2006	Kitt Peak	Spacewatch	·	3.4 km	MPC · JPL
405831	2006 BC_{152}	—	January 25, 2006	Kitt Peak	Spacewatch	EOS	2.1 km	MPC · JPL
405832	2006 BW_{153}	—	January 25, 2006	Kitt Peak	Spacewatch	·	830 m	MPC · JPL
405833	2006 BQ_{158}	—	December 25, 2005	Mount Lemmon	Mount Lemmon Survey	·	850 m	MPC · JPL
405834	2006 BM_{159}	—	January 26, 2006	Kitt Peak	Spacewatch	·	740 m	MPC · JPL
405835	2006 BB_{179}	—	January 7, 2006	Mount Lemmon	Mount Lemmon Survey	·	4.3 km	MPC · JPL
405836	2006 BD_{179}	—	January 27, 2006	Mount Lemmon	Mount Lemmon Survey	·	680 m	MPC · JPL
405837	2006 BV_{182}	—	January 27, 2006	Mount Lemmon	Mount Lemmon Survey	EOS	2.2 km	MPC · JPL
405838	2006 BZ_{185}	—	January 5, 2006	Mount Lemmon	Mount Lemmon Survey	·	3.2 km	MPC · JPL
405839	2006 BO_{199}	—	January 30, 2006	Kitt Peak	Spacewatch	·	650 m	MPC · JPL
405840	2006 BP_{203}	—	April 13, 2001	Kitt Peak	Spacewatch	THM	2.4 km	MPC · JPL
405841	2006 BF_{212}	—	January 31, 2006	Kitt Peak	Spacewatch	TIR	2.9 km	MPC · JPL
405842	2006 BQ_{223}	—	January 30, 2006	Kitt Peak	Spacewatch	·	740 m	MPC · JPL
405843	2006 BT_{227}	—	January 26, 2006	Kitt Peak	Spacewatch	·	770 m	MPC · JPL
405844	2006 BM_{229}	—	December 5, 2005	Mount Lemmon	Mount Lemmon Survey	·	2.0 km	MPC · JPL
405845	2006 BJ_{230}	—	January 23, 2006	Kitt Peak	Spacewatch	·	3.2 km	MPC · JPL
405846	2006 BS_{248}	—	January 31, 2006	Kitt Peak	Spacewatch	·	3.3 km	MPC · JPL
405847	2006 BR_{255}	—	January 31, 2006	Catalina	CSS	·	3.8 km	MPC · JPL
405848	2006 BQ_{278}	—	January 26, 2006	Kitt Peak	Spacewatch	·	640 m	MPC · JPL
405849	2006 BA_{280}	—	January 23, 2006	Kitt Peak	Spacewatch	·	3.8 km	MPC · JPL
405850	2006 BN_{283}	—	January 22, 2006	Mount Lemmon	Mount Lemmon Survey	·	1.5 km	MPC · JPL
405851	2006 CZ_{10}	—	January 7, 2006	Mount Lemmon	Mount Lemmon Survey	EMA	3.5 km	MPC · JPL
405852	2006 CS_{12}	—	February 1, 2006	Kitt Peak	Spacewatch	·	2.5 km	MPC · JPL
405853	2006 CA_{15}	—	January 8, 2006	Mount Lemmon	Mount Lemmon Survey	·	2.3 km	MPC · JPL
405854	2006 CE_{58}	—	January 22, 2006	Mount Lemmon	Mount Lemmon Survey	·	3.0 km	MPC · JPL
405855	2006 CW_{66}	—	August 4, 2003	Kitt Peak	Spacewatch	·	3.0 km	MPC · JPL
405856	2006 DB_{10}	—	January 23, 2006	Kitt Peak	Spacewatch	·	890 m	MPC · JPL
405857	2006 DA_{53}	—	February 24, 2006	Kitt Peak	Spacewatch	·	3.9 km	MPC · JPL
405858	2006 DU_{55}	—	February 24, 2006	Mount Lemmon	Mount Lemmon Survey	·	2.8 km	MPC · JPL
405859	2006 DP_{61}	—	February 24, 2006	Mount Lemmon	Mount Lemmon Survey	T_{j} (2.98) · EUP	4.4 km	MPC · JPL
405860	2006 DJ_{65}	—	February 21, 2006	Catalina	CSS	·	860 m	MPC · JPL
405861	2006 DN_{80}	—	February 24, 2006	Kitt Peak	Spacewatch	NYS	870 m	MPC · JPL
405862	2006 DJ_{81}	—	February 24, 2006	Kitt Peak	Spacewatch	·	630 m	MPC · JPL
405863	2006 DJ_{84}	—	February 24, 2006	Kitt Peak	Spacewatch	·	2.4 km	MPC · JPL
405864	2006 DP_{90}	—	February 24, 2006	Kitt Peak	Spacewatch	·	3.3 km	MPC · JPL
405865	2006 DZ_{96}	—	February 24, 2006	Mount Lemmon	Mount Lemmon Survey	·	4.5 km	MPC · JPL
405866	2006 DQ_{98}	—	January 26, 2006	Kitt Peak	Spacewatch	·	2.3 km	MPC · JPL
405867	2006 DJ_{111}	—	February 27, 2006	Kitt Peak	Spacewatch	·	3.7 km	MPC · JPL
405868	2006 DO_{111}	—	February 20, 2006	Kitt Peak	Spacewatch	·	3.2 km	MPC · JPL
405869	2006 DS_{127}	—	January 23, 2006	Mount Lemmon	Mount Lemmon Survey	·	670 m	MPC · JPL
405870	2006 DL_{149}	—	February 25, 2006	Kitt Peak	Spacewatch	·	920 m	MPC · JPL
405871	2006 DW_{149}	—	February 25, 2006	Kitt Peak	Spacewatch	·	710 m	MPC · JPL
405872	2006 DS_{176}	—	February 27, 2006	Mount Lemmon	Mount Lemmon Survey	HYG	2.8 km	MPC · JPL
405873	2006 DW_{179}	—	September 27, 2003	Kitt Peak	Spacewatch	·	2.8 km	MPC · JPL
405874	2006 DK_{200}	—	February 24, 2006	Palomar	NEAT	PHO	1.8 km	MPC · JPL
405875	2006 DN_{210}	—	February 20, 2006	Kitt Peak	Spacewatch	NYS	900 m	MPC · JPL
405876	2006 DN_{216}	—	February 20, 2006	Kitt Peak	Spacewatch	·	2.5 km	MPC · JPL
405877	2006 EU_{3}	—	October 3, 1997	Kitt Peak	Spacewatch	·	730 m	MPC · JPL
405878	2006 EL_{5}	—	February 4, 2006	Mount Lemmon	Mount Lemmon Survey	NYS	1.2 km	MPC · JPL
405879	2006 EF_{7}	—	March 2, 2006	Kitt Peak	Spacewatch	·	980 m	MPC · JPL
405880	2006 EA_{14}	—	March 2, 2006	Kitt Peak	Spacewatch	·	950 m	MPC · JPL
405881	2006 EO_{17}	—	February 20, 2006	Kitt Peak	Spacewatch	·	910 m	MPC · JPL
405882	2006 EL_{21}	—	January 30, 2006	Kitt Peak	Spacewatch	·	2.8 km	MPC · JPL
405883	2006 EX_{21}	—	March 3, 2006	Kitt Peak	Spacewatch	·	2.6 km	MPC · JPL
405884	2006 EN_{37}	—	March 3, 2006	Kitt Peak	Spacewatch	PHO	2.2 km	MPC · JPL
405885	2006 EC_{67}	—	March 8, 2006	Kitt Peak	Spacewatch	·	700 m	MPC · JPL
405886	2006 EU_{67}	—	January 5, 2006	Mount Lemmon	Mount Lemmon Survey	·	2.5 km	MPC · JPL
405887	2006 FO_{6}	—	March 23, 2006	Mount Lemmon	Mount Lemmon Survey	·	3.1 km	MPC · JPL
405888	2006 FB_{31}	—	March 25, 2006	Kitt Peak	Spacewatch	·	3.3 km	MPC · JPL
405889	2006 FH_{32}	—	March 25, 2006	Mount Lemmon	Mount Lemmon Survey	·	3.9 km	MPC · JPL
405890	2006 FQ_{32}	—	March 25, 2006	Kitt Peak	Spacewatch	MAS	760 m	MPC · JPL
405891	2006 FS_{37}	—	January 6, 2006	Mount Lemmon	Mount Lemmon Survey	·	1.2 km	MPC · JPL
405892	2006 FJ_{39}	—	March 24, 2006	Kitt Peak	Spacewatch	·	3.4 km	MPC · JPL
405893	2006 GH_{28}	—	April 2, 2006	Kitt Peak	Spacewatch	·	1 km	MPC · JPL
405894	2006 GQ_{28}	—	April 2, 2006	Kitt Peak	Spacewatch	V	690 m	MPC · JPL
405895	2006 GJ_{40}	—	April 6, 2006	Catalina	CSS	·	1.6 km	MPC · JPL
405896	2006 HS_{8}	—	March 4, 2006	Kitt Peak	Spacewatch	·	2.9 km	MPC · JPL
405897	2006 HO_{16}	—	April 20, 2006	Kitt Peak	Spacewatch	·	1.5 km	MPC · JPL
405898	2006 HO_{18}	—	March 23, 2006	Mount Lemmon	Mount Lemmon Survey	·	930 m	MPC · JPL
405899	2006 HV_{18}	—	April 18, 2006	Kitt Peak	Spacewatch	V	560 m	MPC · JPL
405900	2006 HK_{22}	—	April 20, 2006	Kitt Peak	Spacewatch	NYS	1.2 km	MPC · JPL

== 405901–406000 ==
back to top

Designation			Discovery			Properties		Ref
Permanent	Provisional	Named after	Date	Site	Discoverer(s)	Category	Diam.	Ref
405901	2006 HM_{36}	—	April 20, 2006	Kitt Peak	Spacewatch	NYS	980 m	MPC · JPL
405902	2006 HM_{56}	—	March 23, 2006	Kitt Peak	Spacewatch	·	1.2 km	MPC · JPL
405903	2006 HO_{64}	—	April 24, 2006	Kitt Peak	Spacewatch	·	950 m	MPC · JPL
405904	2006 HW_{71}	—	April 25, 2006	Kitt Peak	Spacewatch	V	620 m	MPC · JPL
405905	2006 HG_{72}	—	April 25, 2006	Kitt Peak	Spacewatch	·	1.2 km	MPC · JPL
405906	2006 HT_{82}	—	April 26, 2006	Kitt Peak	Spacewatch	·	1.0 km	MPC · JPL
405907	2006 HW_{98}	—	April 26, 2006	Kitt Peak	Spacewatch	·	980 m	MPC · JPL
405908	2006 HH_{99}	—	April 30, 2006	Kitt Peak	Spacewatch	·	1.3 km	MPC · JPL
405909	2006 HW_{103}	—	March 9, 2005	Catalina	CSS	·	4.3 km	MPC · JPL
405910	2006 HC_{117}	—	April 26, 2006	Mount Lemmon	Mount Lemmon Survey	·	4.6 km	MPC · JPL
405911	2006 HU_{120}	—	April 30, 2006	Kitt Peak	Spacewatch	NYS	1.2 km	MPC · JPL
405912	2006 HR_{132}	—	April 26, 2006	Cerro Tololo	M. W. Buie	·	2.7 km	MPC · JPL
405913	2006 JJ_{11}	—	April 19, 2006	Kitt Peak	Spacewatch	NYS	1.1 km	MPC · JPL
405914	2006 JX_{62}	—	May 1, 2006	Kitt Peak	M. W. Buie	·	880 m	MPC · JPL
405915	2006 JP_{70}	—	May 1, 2006	Mauna Kea	P. A. Wiegert	·	860 m	MPC · JPL
405916	2006 JG_{81}	—	May 8, 2006	Mount Lemmon	Mount Lemmon Survey	·	920 m	MPC · JPL
405917	2006 KO_{5}	—	May 9, 2006	Mount Lemmon	Mount Lemmon Survey	·	1.2 km	MPC · JPL
405918	2006 KN_{28}	—	May 20, 2006	Kitt Peak	Spacewatch	VER	6.4 km	MPC · JPL
405919	2006 KC_{37}	—	May 21, 2006	Mount Lemmon	Mount Lemmon Survey	·	1.4 km	MPC · JPL
405920	2006 KG_{48}	—	May 21, 2006	Kitt Peak	Spacewatch	·	1.1 km	MPC · JPL
405921	2006 KW_{50}	—	May 21, 2006	Kitt Peak	Spacewatch	MAS	670 m	MPC · JPL
405922	2006 KZ_{53}	—	May 21, 2006	Kitt Peak	Spacewatch	·	1.2 km	MPC · JPL
405923	2006 KQ_{58}	—	May 22, 2006	Kitt Peak	Spacewatch	·	1.1 km	MPC · JPL
405924	2006 KD_{68}	—	May 20, 2006	Palomar	NEAT	·	1.2 km	MPC · JPL
405925	2006 KC_{71}	—	May 22, 2006	Kitt Peak	Spacewatch	·	910 m	MPC · JPL
405926	2006 KQ_{109}	—	May 31, 2006	Mount Lemmon	Mount Lemmon Survey	NYS	1.0 km	MPC · JPL
405927	2006 OR_{21}	—	July 25, 2006	Mount Lemmon	Mount Lemmon Survey	·	720 m	MPC · JPL
405928	2006 PO_{32}	—	August 15, 2006	Palomar	NEAT	T_{j} (2.97) · 3:2	8.0 km	MPC · JPL
405929	2006 QG_{3}	—	August 17, 2006	Palomar	NEAT	·	1.5 km	MPC · JPL
405930	2006 QL_{69}	—	August 21, 2006	Kitt Peak	Spacewatch	3:2 · SHU	5.3 km	MPC · JPL
405931	2006 QK_{82}	—	August 25, 2006	Socorro	LINEAR	3:2 · SHU	5.7 km	MPC · JPL
405932	2006 QR_{94}	—	August 16, 2006	Palomar	NEAT	·	1.5 km	MPC · JPL
405933	2006 QT_{185}	—	August 28, 2006	Kitt Peak	Spacewatch	·	1.0 km	MPC · JPL
405934	2006 RM_{3}	—	September 12, 2006	Catalina	CSS	H	570 m	MPC · JPL
405935	2006 RO_{5}	—	September 14, 2006	Catalina	CSS	·	1.3 km	MPC · JPL
405936	2006 RC_{28}	—	September 14, 2006	Kitt Peak	Spacewatch	·	920 m	MPC · JPL
405937	2006 RN_{33}	—	September 2, 2006	Marly	Observatoire Naef	·	1.3 km	MPC · JPL
405938	2006 RC_{43}	—	September 14, 2006	Kitt Peak	Spacewatch	·	970 m	MPC · JPL
405939	2006 RP_{48}	—	September 14, 2006	Kitt Peak	Spacewatch	(5)	960 m	MPC · JPL
405940	2006 RV_{50}	—	September 14, 2006	Kitt Peak	Spacewatch	·	1.3 km	MPC · JPL
405941	2006 RM_{53}	—	September 14, 2006	Kitt Peak	Spacewatch	RAF	660 m	MPC · JPL
405942	2006 RA_{54}	—	September 14, 2006	Kitt Peak	Spacewatch	BRG	1.1 km	MPC · JPL
405943	2006 RU_{57}	—	September 15, 2006	Kitt Peak	Spacewatch	3:2 · SHU	4.9 km	MPC · JPL
405944	2006 RH_{58}	—	September 15, 2006	Kitt Peak	Spacewatch	·	1.3 km	MPC · JPL
405945	2006 RF_{75}	—	September 15, 2006	Kitt Peak	Spacewatch	·	1.3 km	MPC · JPL
405946	2006 RL_{76}	—	September 15, 2006	Kitt Peak	Spacewatch	·	660 m	MPC · JPL
405947	2006 RO_{86}	—	September 15, 2006	Kitt Peak	Spacewatch	·	870 m	MPC · JPL
405948	2006 RD_{94}	—	September 15, 2006	Kitt Peak	Spacewatch	·	1.4 km	MPC · JPL
405949	2006 RM_{105}	—	September 14, 2006	Mauna Kea	Masiero, J.	·	1.0 km	MPC · JPL
405950	2006 RM_{120}	—	September 14, 2006	Kitt Peak	Spacewatch	·	940 m	MPC · JPL
405951	2006 SD_{1}	—	September 16, 2006	Kitt Peak	Spacewatch	·	1.2 km	MPC · JPL
405952	2006 SK_{3}	—	September 16, 2006	Catalina	CSS	·	960 m	MPC · JPL
405953	2006 SX_{4}	—	September 16, 2006	Palomar	NEAT	·	840 m	MPC · JPL
405954	2006 SA_{5}	—	September 16, 2006	Palomar	NEAT	H	500 m	MPC · JPL
405955	2006 SR_{6}	—	September 16, 2006	Siding Spring	SSS	MAR	1.2 km	MPC · JPL
405956	2006 SW_{11}	—	September 16, 2006	Catalina	CSS	·	1.1 km	MPC · JPL
405957	2006 SP_{13}	—	September 17, 2006	Socorro	LINEAR	·	2.2 km	MPC · JPL
405958	2006 SW_{13}	—	September 17, 2006	Kitt Peak	Spacewatch	·	1.4 km	MPC · JPL
405959	2006 SR_{34}	—	September 17, 2006	Catalina	CSS	·	1.0 km	MPC · JPL
405960	2006 SE_{44}	—	September 17, 2006	Catalina	CSS	·	890 m	MPC · JPL
405961	2006 SR_{45}	—	September 18, 2006	Catalina	CSS	·	1.0 km	MPC · JPL
405962	2006 SN_{56}	—	September 19, 2006	Catalina	CSS	·	2.3 km	MPC · JPL
405963	2006 SZ_{61}	—	September 18, 2006	Catalina	CSS	(5)	1.1 km	MPC · JPL
405964	2006 SP_{65}	—	September 18, 2006	Kitt Peak	Spacewatch	·	1.2 km	MPC · JPL
405965	2006 SW_{71}	—	September 19, 2006	Kitt Peak	Spacewatch	·	1.4 km	MPC · JPL
405966	2006 SN_{76}	—	September 19, 2006	Kitt Peak	Spacewatch	·	1.9 km	MPC · JPL
405967	2006 SL_{83}	—	September 18, 2006	Kitt Peak	Spacewatch	·	1.7 km	MPC · JPL
405968	2006 SG_{85}	—	September 18, 2006	Kitt Peak	Spacewatch	·	1.0 km	MPC · JPL
405969	2006 SG_{103}	—	September 19, 2006	Kitt Peak	Spacewatch	·	1.2 km	MPC · JPL
405970	2006 SJ_{105}	—	September 19, 2006	Kitt Peak	Spacewatch	MIS	2.7 km	MPC · JPL
405971	2006 SZ_{113}	—	September 23, 2006	Kitt Peak	Spacewatch	ADE	2.3 km	MPC · JPL
405972	2006 SV_{116}	—	September 24, 2006	Kitt Peak	Spacewatch	·	1.1 km	MPC · JPL
405973	2006 SJ_{123}	—	September 19, 2006	Catalina	CSS	·	2.6 km	MPC · JPL
405974	2006 SC_{129}	—	September 17, 2006	Catalina	CSS	H	550 m	MPC · JPL
405975	2006 SB_{132}	—	September 16, 2006	Catalina	CSS	(194)	1.2 km	MPC · JPL
405976	2006 SR_{147}	—	September 19, 2006	Kitt Peak	Spacewatch	(5)	950 m	MPC · JPL
405977	2006 SY_{152}	—	September 20, 2006	Kitt Peak	Spacewatch	(5)	1.2 km	MPC · JPL
405978	2006 SV_{153}	—	September 20, 2006	Catalina	CSS	H	670 m	MPC · JPL
405979	2006 SU_{154}	—	September 21, 2006	Anderson Mesa	LONEOS	(5)	1.2 km	MPC · JPL
405980	2006 SA_{156}	—	August 29, 2006	Catalina	CSS	PHO	1.1 km	MPC · JPL
405981	2006 SO_{182}	—	September 25, 2006	Mount Lemmon	Mount Lemmon Survey	·	780 m	MPC · JPL
405982	2006 SV_{183}	—	September 25, 2006	Mount Lemmon	Mount Lemmon Survey	·	2.1 km	MPC · JPL
405983	2006 SE_{208}	—	September 11, 2006	Catalina	CSS	H	620 m	MPC · JPL
405984	2006 SH_{208}	—	September 26, 2006	Kitt Peak	Spacewatch	·	680 m	MPC · JPL
405985	2006 SM_{223}	—	September 25, 2006	Mount Lemmon	Mount Lemmon Survey	·	1.6 km	MPC · JPL
405986	2006 SS_{242}	—	September 26, 2006	Kitt Peak	Spacewatch	(5)	1.1 km	MPC · JPL
405987	2006 SZ_{257}	—	September 26, 2006	Kitt Peak	Spacewatch	·	1.4 km	MPC · JPL
405988	2006 SE_{281}	—	September 29, 2006	Anderson Mesa	LONEOS	EUN	1.5 km	MPC · JPL
405989	2006 SH_{287}	—	September 22, 2006	Anderson Mesa	LONEOS	·	1.6 km	MPC · JPL
405990	2006 SG_{294}	—	September 17, 2006	Kitt Peak	Spacewatch	(5)	770 m	MPC · JPL
405991	2006 SX_{309}	—	September 27, 2006	Kitt Peak	Spacewatch	·	1.9 km	MPC · JPL
405992	2006 SN_{310}	—	September 27, 2006	Kitt Peak	Spacewatch	·	1.0 km	MPC · JPL
405993	2006 SP_{318}	—	September 27, 2006	Kitt Peak	Spacewatch	·	1.1 km	MPC · JPL
405994	2006 SH_{333}	—	September 28, 2006	Kitt Peak	Spacewatch	·	3.4 km	MPC · JPL
405995	2006 SM_{335}	—	July 21, 2006	Mount Lemmon	Mount Lemmon Survey	·	2.0 km	MPC · JPL
405996	2006 SP_{343}	—	September 18, 2006	Kitt Peak	Spacewatch	HNS	1.2 km	MPC · JPL
405997	2006 SM_{345}	—	September 28, 2006	Kitt Peak	Spacewatch	·	1.1 km	MPC · JPL
405998	2006 SW_{350}	—	September 30, 2006	Catalina	CSS	3:2	5.8 km	MPC · JPL
405999	2006 SM_{353}	—	September 30, 2006	Catalina	CSS	EUN	1.3 km	MPC · JPL
406000	2006 SG_{356}	—	September 30, 2006	Catalina	CSS	EUN	1.4 km	MPC · JPL

back to top

== Meaning of names ==
As minor planet discoveries are confirmed, they are given a permanent number by the IAU's Minor Planet Center (MPC), and the discoverers can then submit names for them, following the IAU's naming conventions. The list below concerns those minor planets in the specified number-range that have received names, and explains the meanings of those names.

Official naming citations of newly named small Solar System bodies are approved and published in a bulletin by IAU's Working Group for Small Bodies Nomenclature (WGSBN). Before May 2021, citations were published in MPC's Minor Planet Circulars for many decades. Recent citations can also be found on the JPL Small-Body Database (SBDB). Until his death in 2016, German astronomer Lutz D. Schmadel compiled these citations into the Dictionary of Minor Planet Names (DMP) and regularly updated the collection.

Based on Paul Herget's The Names of the Minor Planets, Schmadel also researched the unclear origin of numerous asteroids, most of which had been named prior to World War II. This article incorporates text from this source, which is in the public domain: SBDB New namings may only be added to this list below after official publication as the preannouncement of names is condemned. The WGSBN publishes a comprehensive guideline for the naming rules of non-cometary small Solar System bodies.

Named minor planet	Provisional	This minor planet was named for...	Ref · Catalog
405207 Konstanz	2003 KP_{18}	Konstanz, a city in south-west Germany, situated on the Bodensee lake and the Rhine river bordering Switzerland	JPL · 405207
405571 Erdőspál	2005 QE_{87}	Paul Erdős (Erdős Pál; 1913–1996) was a Hungarian mathematician, much of whose work centered around discrete mathematics. His work leaned towards solving previously open problems, rather than developing or exploring new areas of mathematics. He published around 1500 mathematical papers during his lifetime.	IAU · 405571
