= Robert Adolf Naef =

Swiss astronomer

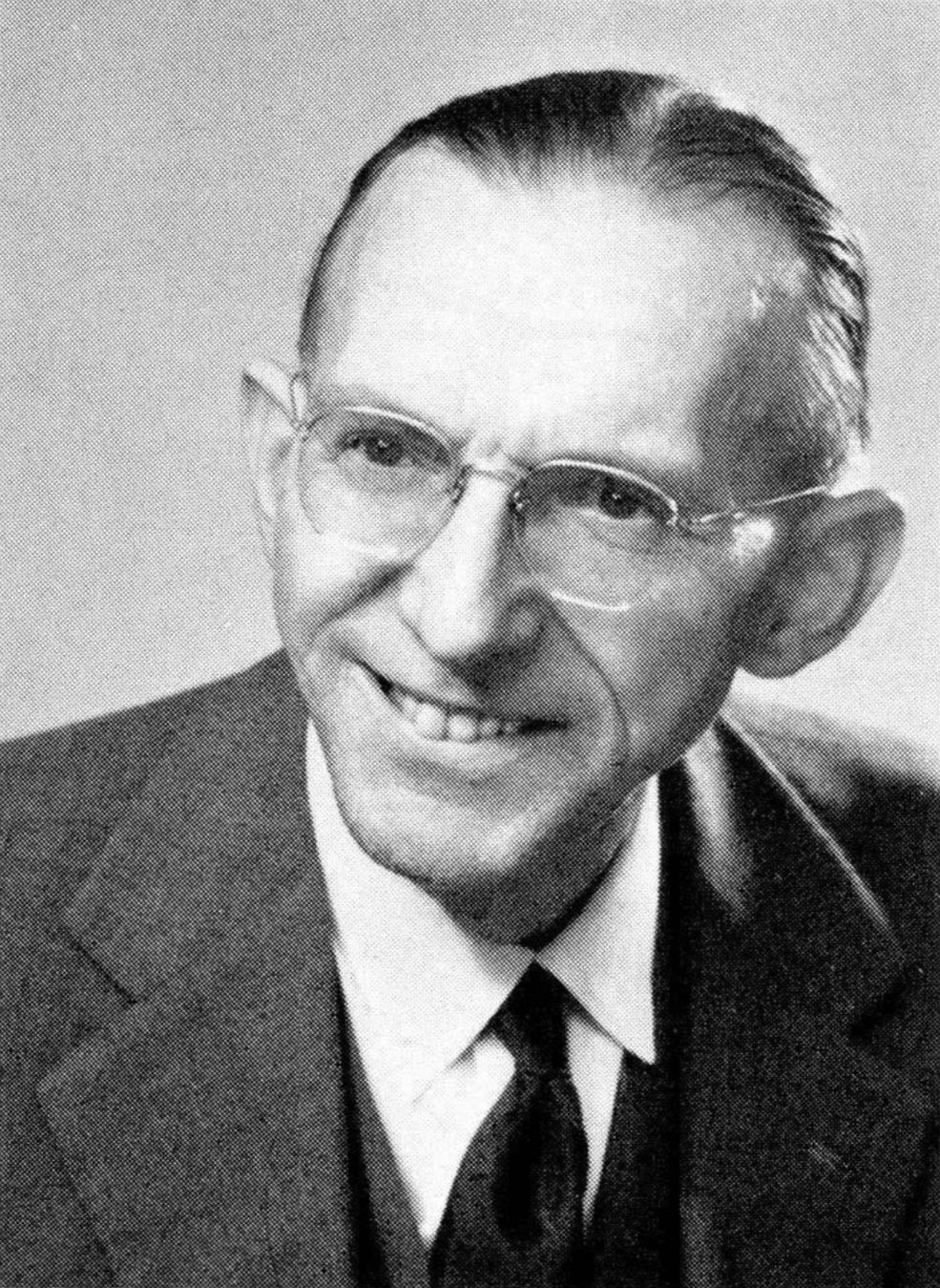
Robert Adolf Naef

Robert Adolf Naef (22 July 1907 – 13 March 1975) was a Swiss astronomer. A banker by profession, in his spare time, for 50 years he worked at the Urania Observatory in Zürich. In 1941 he created the nautical almanac Der Sternenhimmel.

== Legacy ==
- 1906 Naef, a stony asteroid named after Naef
- Observatory Naef Épendes at Épendes, Switzerland, named after Naef
