= Observatory Naef Épendes =

Observatoire Robert A. Naef
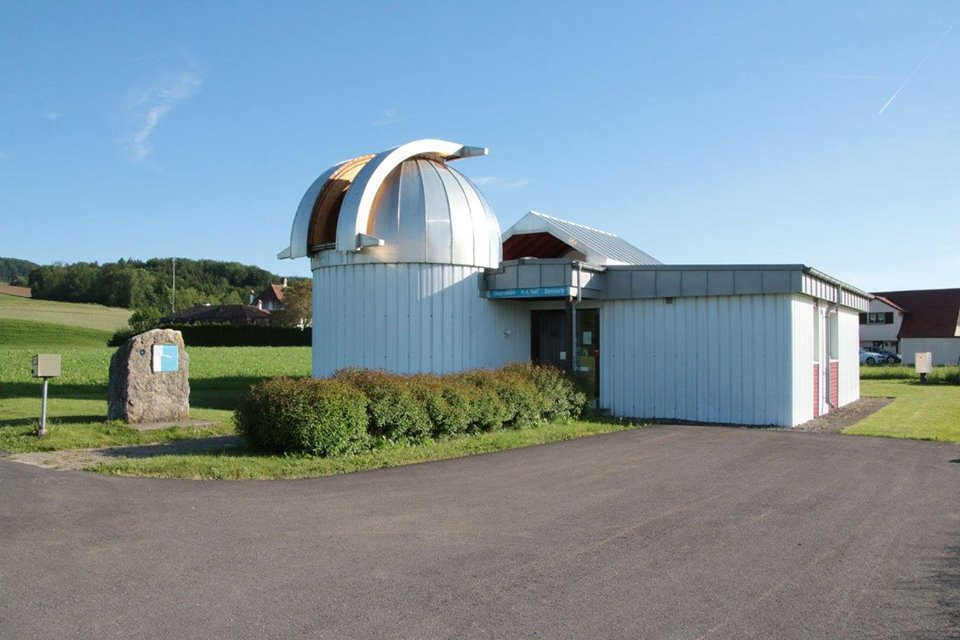
- Alternative names: Observatory of Épendes
- Named after: Robert Adolf Naef
- Observatory code: A13
- Location: Épendes, Canton of Fribourg, Switzerland
- Coordinates: 46°45′44.65″N 7°08′21.84″E
- Altitude: 680 m (2,230 ft)
- Established: 1984
- Website: observatoire-ependes.ch
- Related media on Commons

Observatory Robert A. Naef (French: Observatoire Robert A. Naef) is an astronomical observatory located at Épendes, Canton of Fribourg, Switzerland at 7.13938 degrees east of Greenwich and 46.76236 degrees north latitude. Its parallax constants are : ρ sin φ' = 0.68632 (Earth radii from the rotation axis) and ρ cos φ' = +0.72501 (Earth radii from the equatorial plane).

The observatory was inaugurated on 10 May 1984 and was named in memory of Robert Adolf Naef (1907–1975). The minor planet 1906 Naef was named in his honour.

== Robert A. Naef Foundation ==
The Robert A. Naef Foundation was created on 15 April 1977 on the initiative of his widow, Mrs. Daisy Naef-Ryter. According to its statutes, the Foundation has the goal of honouring the memory of the late Robert A. Naef (22 July 1907 – 13 March 1975) by installing his Reinfelder & Hertel telescope in a newly created astronomical observatory. The observatory has the further goal of actively contributing to the exposure of young people to the art and science of astronomy. The Foundation was recognised as being of public interest by the Government of the Canton (State) of Fribourg on 16 May 1978. For 50 years Robert Adolf Naef, who worked at the Urania Observatory in Zurich, dedicated all his spare time and energy to popularising astronomy. His Opus Magnum was the creation of the astronomical annual directory "Der Sternenhimmel" in 1941.

== The observatory ==
The astronomical observatory in Épendes is located a few kilometres outside the city of Fribourg (in German Freiburg) in Switzerland, in the countryside, at 700 m above sea level. The observatory is owned by a non-profit organization, the Robert-A. Naef Foundation. The daily operations and maintenance are performed by the Association of Friends of the Épendes Observatory.

Thanks to its ideal location in the south of the greater area of Fribourg and 22 km in the north from Bulle, the observatory serves the purpose of disseminating astronomical knowledge, particularly to children and teenagers as well as to the general population. The observatory is open every Friday evening free to the public.

The schools can also benefit from special visit opportunities (in French or German). For Holiday Pass the observatory is open in the summer and autumn holidays in the canton (state) of Fribourg.

Groups can reserve the observatory on Wednesday or Saturday evenings, on request, with or without observations.

== The equipment ==
=== Reinfelder & Hertel telescope ===
The invention of the telescope in 1608 and the subsequent developments in optics led to the revolutionary progress of the 17th and 18th centuries. This type of telescope is called a refractor because it deviates the light coming from an object in such a way that its image is reversed; observation is done through an eyepiece at the end of the tube, which allows magnification of the image. Bequeathed by Mr. Robert A. Naef, the observatory's telescope is a Reinfelder & Hertel with a diameter of 162.5 mm and a focal distance of 1435 mm - this allows a magnification of X150.

=== Keller telescope ===
This telescope Keller was inaugurated on 21 May 2004. It is a Cassegrain type telescope, equipped with a 50 cm diameter mirror for a focal distance of 5000 mm. It is fixed on a fully computer-driven German mounting. The telescope offers staggering image of deep space objects.

=== The coelostat ===
The design and assembly of the coelostat VTT 120 extends the equipment of the observatory to another area. This makes it possible not only to admire the night sky, but also the Sun, with its sunspots, prominences, etc. The installation of the telescope opens to visitors several new possibilities :

- Projection of white sunlight against a wall, so that all observers can simultaneously observe sunspots, granulation, solar rotation, etc.
- Projection of the solar spectrum with the Fraunhofer lines
- Observation of prominences by means of a hydrogen-alpha filter
- Observing the Sun in white light directly in the eyepiece with maximum magnification
- Photography and video works

Designer: AOK (Astrooptik Kohler)

=== C14 telescope ===
The observatory is also equipped with a more modern and more powerful instrument - a Celestron C14. It is a telescope which works with mirrors, as is generally the case with per-formant instruments. This one is a Schmidt-Cassegrain - that is, it has a hyperbolic and concave secondary mirror in the same axis as the primary mirror, which reflects light back through a hole pierced in the primary mirror itself. The image can then be observed through an eyepiece at the end of the tube. This instrument, with a primary mirror of 40 cm diameter can capture about 1800 times more light than the naked eye; the diameter of the eye's pupil is only 5 mm. In order to increase the stability of the instrument we have opted for a German mount. The electronic pilot automatically follows observed objects by compensating for the rotation of the Earth. Our NGC-Max guiding system contains the coordinates of thousands of objects and greatly helps with the aiming of the telescope.

=== Planetarium ===
A mini planetarium, with seating for a dozen people, is used for initiating the general public into celestial mechanics : explanations as to the motion of stars and planets, the location of constellations, etc. are readily visualized. Since March 2006, a new digital planetarium system has been installed: the Digitarium Alpha. This equipment comprises a computer on which an adapted version of the Stellarium open source software runs, and a beamer equipped with a fish-eye lens. A simultaneous projection of the skies together with a drawing of the constellations and astronomical pictures or movies is made possible thanks to the incorporated DVD drive.

At this observatory – among the 1,392,085 minor planets already registered by the Minor Planet Center until 2024 October 31 – 133 new minor planets (numbered between 129342 Ependes, recorded first on 5 November 2005, and 2013) have been discovered by Peter Kocher.
