= 1906 Naef =

Vestian main-belt asteroid

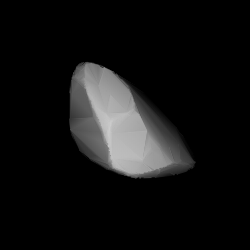
- Modelled shape of Naef from its lightcurve

Discovery
- Discovered by: P. Wild
- Discovery site: Zimmerwald Obs.
- Discovery date: 5 September 1972

Designations
- Named after: Robert A. Naef (amateur astronomer)
- Alternative designations: 1972 RC · 1943 VF; 1952 DG_{1} · 1965 WF
- Minor planet category: main-belt · Vestoid

Orbital characteristics
- Epoch 4 September 2017 (JD 2458000.5)
- Uncertainty parameter 0
- Observation arc: 51.33 yr (18,749 days)
- Aphelion: 2.6944 AU
- Perihelion: 2.0517 AU
- Semi-major axis: 2.3731 AU
- Eccentricity: 0.1354
- Orbital period (sidereal): 3.66 yr (1,335 days)
- Mean anomaly: 94.839°
- Mean motion: 0° 16^{m} 10.56^{s} / day
- Inclination: 6.4757°
- Longitude of ascending node: 354.84°
- Argument of perihelion: 14.485°

Physical characteristics
- Dimensions: 6.64 km (calculated); 7.923±0.090; 8.057±0.083 km
- Synodic rotation period: 11.00818±0.00001 h 11.009±0.0012 h (Note: Pravec (2005) web: rotation period 11.009±0.0012 hours with a brightness amplitude of 0.92 mag. Summary figures at Collaborative Asteroid Lightcurve Link (CALL) for (1906) Naef); 11.0090±0.0002 h 11.03±0.02 h
- Geometric albedo: 0.2282±0.0466; 0.234±0.052; 0.4 (assumed)
- Spectral type: SQ · V
- Absolute magnitude (H): 12.5 · 12.7 · 13.36±0.31

1906 Naef (prov. designation:1972 RC) is a stony vestoid asteroid from the inner regions of the asteroid belt, approximately 7 kilometers in diameter. It was discovered on 5 September 1972, by Swiss astronomer Paul Wild at Zimmerwald Observatory near Bern, Switzerland. It was later named after Swiss banker and amateur astronomer Robert A. Naef.

== Orbit and classification ==
Naef orbits the Sun in the inner main-belt at a distance of 2.1–2.7 AU once every 3 years and 8 months (1,335 days). Its orbit has an eccentricity of 0.14 and an inclination of 6° with respect to the ecliptic. The body's observation arc begins with its official discovery observation at Zimmerwald, as previous observation at Turku Observatory (1943 VF) and McDonald Observatory (1952 DG_{1}) in 1943 and 1952, respectively, remain unused.

== Physical characteristics ==
According to observations by the Wide-field Infrared Survey Explorer's NEOWISE mission, Naef measures 7.9 and 8.1 kilometers in diameter, and its surface has an albedo of 0.23, while the Collaborative Asteroid Lightcurve Link assumes an albedo of 0.40 and calculates a diameter of 6.6 kilometer with an absolute magnitude of 12.5.

Naef is a vestoid or V-type asteroid, with its spectral type comparable to that of the group's namesake, 4 Vesta. V-type asteroids are less common than the abundant S-type asteroids, but they are similar in their stony composition, except for their higher concentration of pyroxenes, an aluminium-rich silicate mineral. PanSTARRS' photometric survey has characterized it as a SQ-type that transitions to the Q-type asteroids.

Four rotational lightcurves, obtained during 2005–2009, gave a well-defined rotation period between 11.01 and 11.03 hours, and a brightness variation of 0.92–0.95 magnitude (U=n.a./3/n.a./2+).

== Naming ==
This minor planet was named after Swiss banker Robert A. Naef (1907–1975) from Zürich, an ardent amateur astronomer, who produced the yearly observers almanac, Der Sternenhimmel, since 1940. The official naming citation was published by the Minor Planet Center on 18 April 1977 (M.P.C. 4157).
