= Argentina–Germany relations =

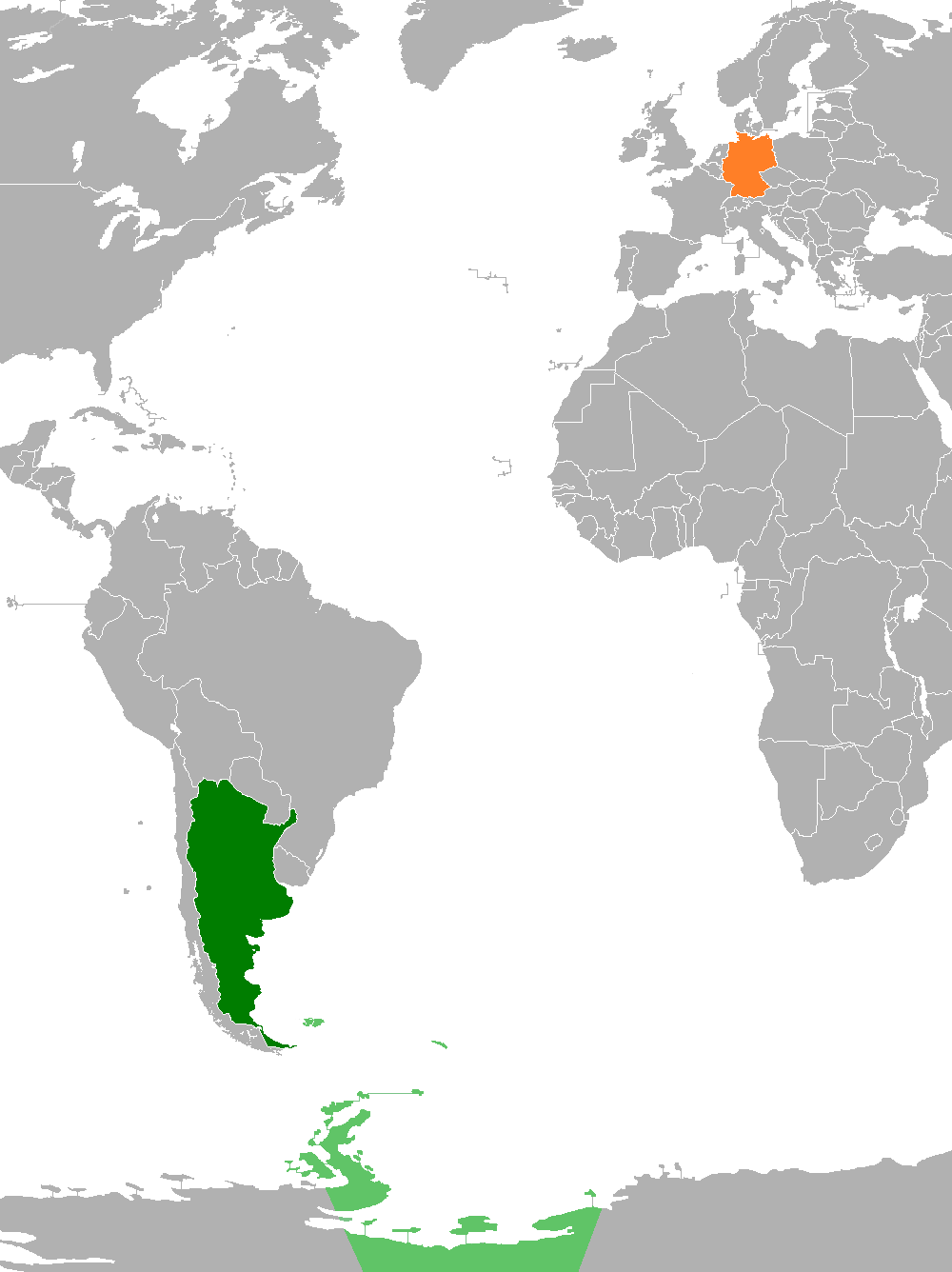

- Argentina: Germany

Foreign relations between Argentina and Germany have existed over a century. The free city-state of Hamburg was the first German state to establish diplomatic relations with Argentina in 1829. The first ambassador of Germany to Argentina was sent on 7 May 1871.

They had great influence in the Argentine education system and many German schools were a place in the country. In fact, the Argentine army planned to recruit many German scientists and technicians for industry. Many German entrepreneurs and professionals believe that Argentina was industrialized and could be narrowed through greater ties of German technology. The creation of newspapers in German as Argentinisches Tageblatt, which means "Argentine newspaper" outstanding and continues to this day.

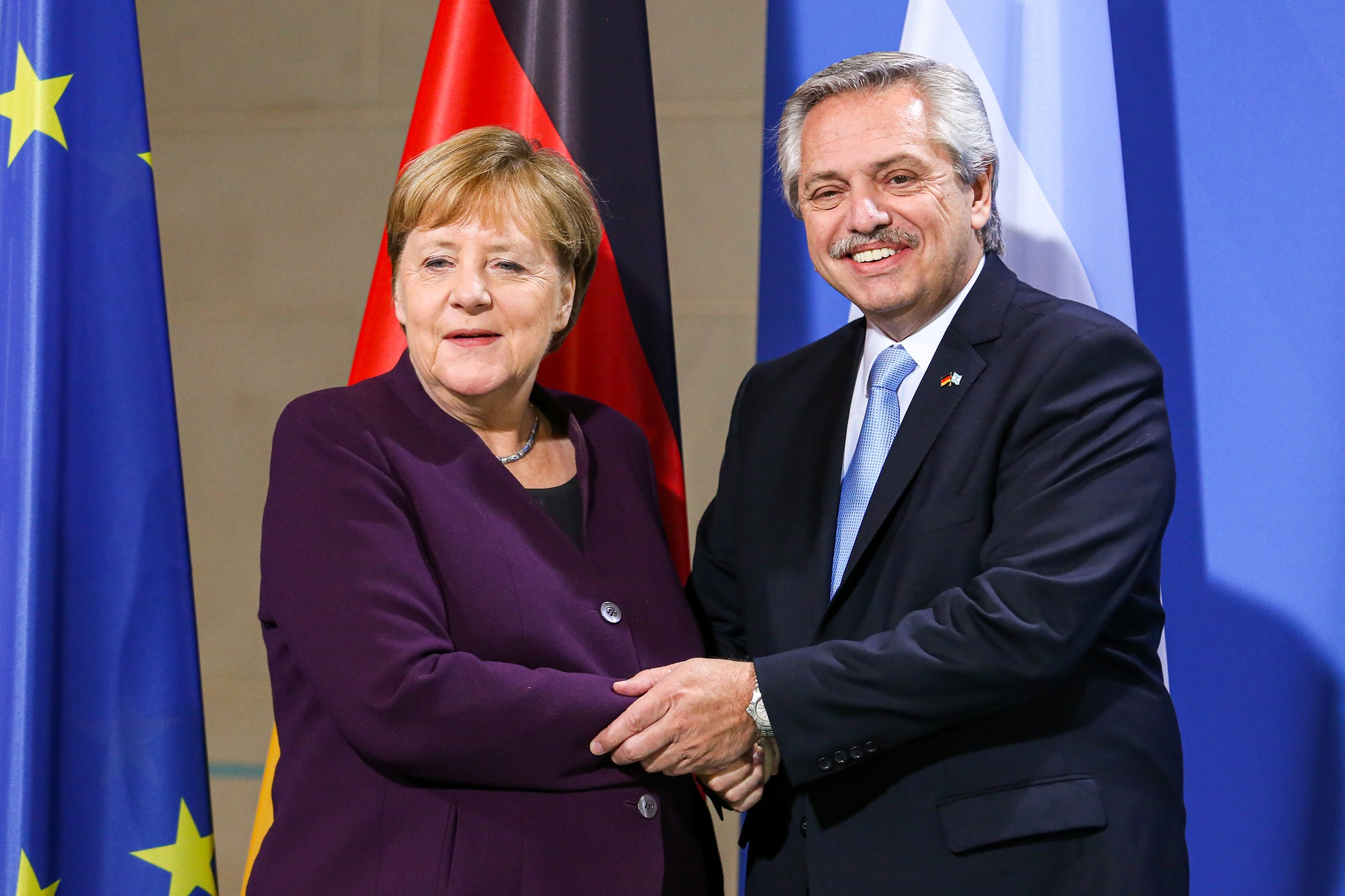
President of Argentina, Alberto Fernández with German Chancellor, Angela Merkel in Berlin, February 2020.

== History ==
=== 1870-1939 ===
Trade developed between Germany and Argentina as early as the German Unification of 1871.

During the First World War, the major powers used propaganda to gain support in Argentina. Germany used the daily newspaper La Unión. It tried to counteract the pro-Allied mood that prevailed in public opinion due to demographic, economic, cultural, and informational factors. It succeeded in motivating the German community, but with British control of the Atlantic Ocean the economic relations favoured the Allies.

The prestige of Germany and German culture in Argentina remained high after the First World War but did not recover to its pre-war levels.

=== World War II ===
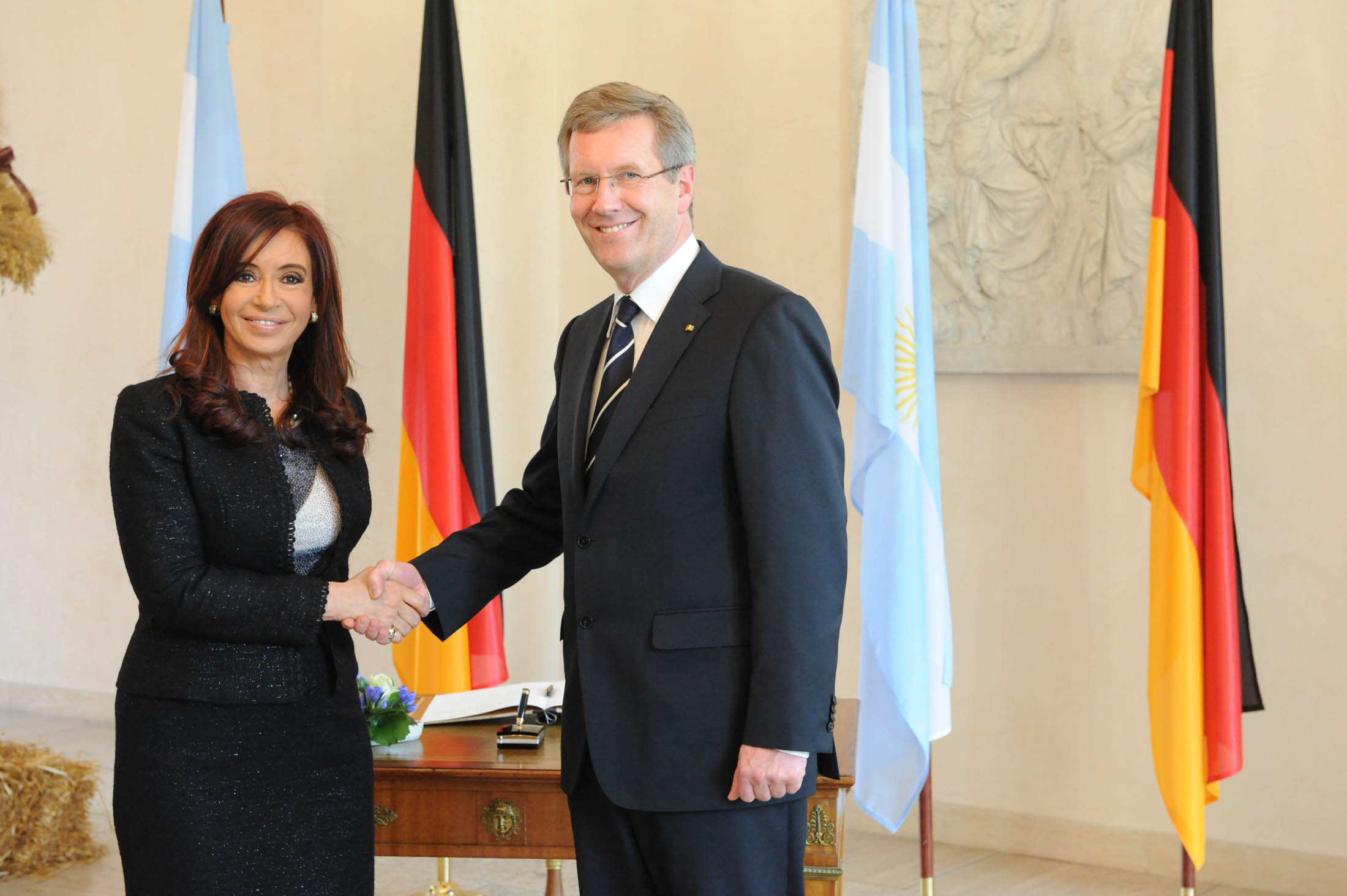
Former President Cristina Fernández de Kirchner and former President Christian Wulff.

By the beginning of World War II, Argentina had a significant population of ethnic Germans. One area where they were particularly prominent was Misiones Province, Argentina's northeastern panhandle bordering on Paraguay and Brazil. It is estimated that by the early 1940s, there were around 10,000 ethnic Germans in Misiones, out of the province's total population of 190,000. With the rise of Nazism in Germany, Nazi agents started active propaganda work among the ethnic Germans living in Argentina, with Nazi-organized meetings reportedly held as early as 1933. The pro-Nazi-Germany atmosphere in some small, predominantly German communities of the northeast was so intense during WWII, that some Argentine officials who visited such towns reported that they could hardly feel themselves to still be in Argentina. The Nazis were strongly opposed by the local Polish-Argentines, as well as by the anti-Nazi German-Jewish minority. Argentina stayed neutral during the whole of World War II, declaring war on Germany only just before its capitulation. To postwar Germans, Argentina was the most desirable destination for middle- and upper-class emigrants next to Switzerland. Many returned after the fall of Peron. However, Germans traditionally consider themselves to have a Special Relationship to Argentina and Chile, two countries maintaining an unabated state of friendship in good and bad times.

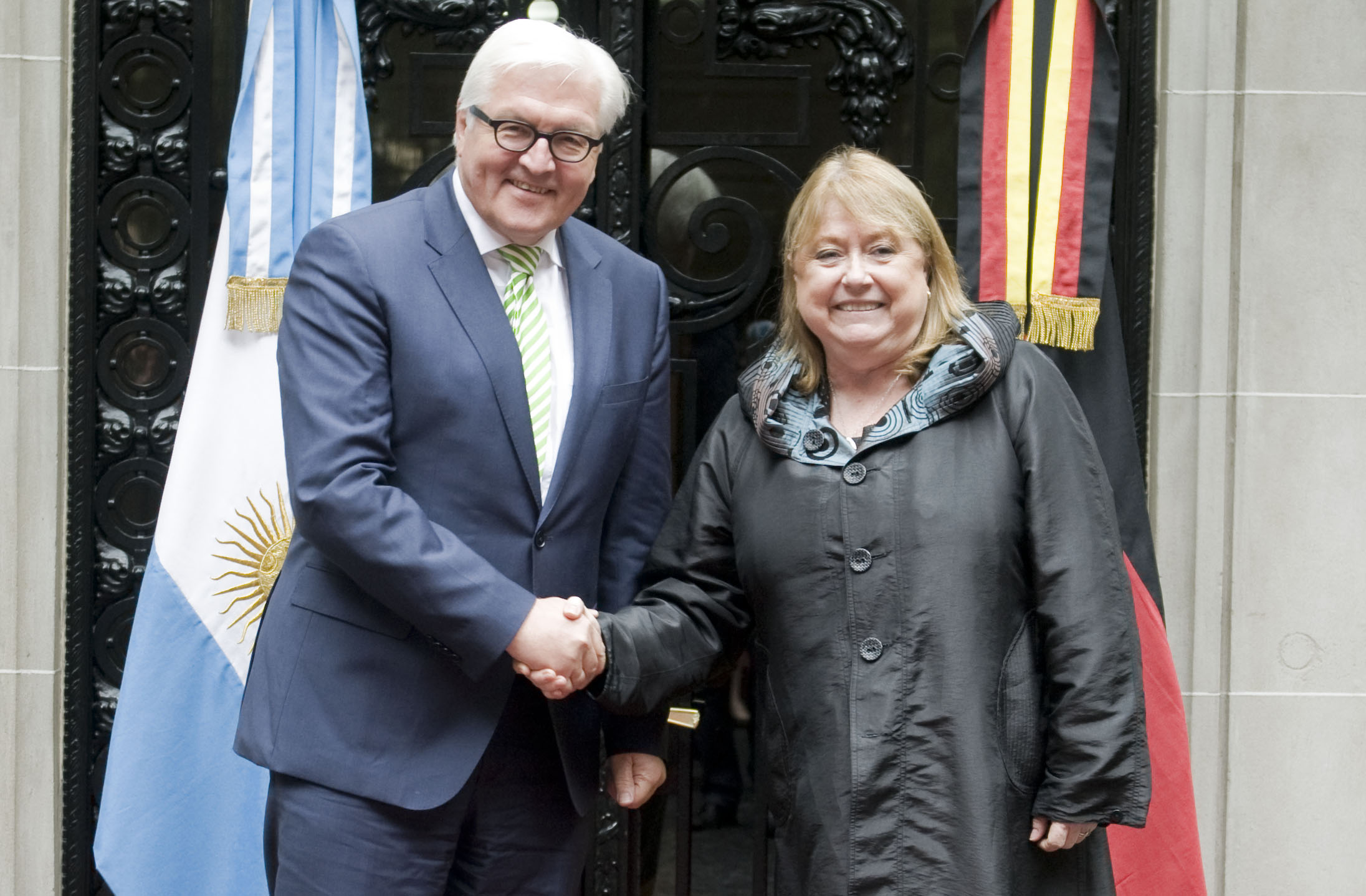
Susana Malcorra, Argentina's Minister of Foreign Affairs with Frank-Walter Steinmeier, German Minister of Foreign Affairs in Buenos Aires.

Under President Juan Peron following 1945, some Nazi officials emigrated to South America to avoid prosecution. Those who lived in Argentina included Adolf Eichmann, Josef Mengele, Aribert Heim, Eduard Roschmann and "Bubi" Ludolf von Alvensleben. In 2020, it was reported that 12,000 Nazis fled to Argentina during and after World War II.

=== Since 1960 ===
During the temporary Argentine Occupation of the Falklands in 1982, Argentina was prepared to remove its troops if they could be replaced by "neutral" ones. Their suggestion was that the USA could represent Britain while Germany would do so for Argentina.

== Economic relations ==
In 2007, Germany was Argentina's fourth-largest import partner at 5 percent, behind Brazil, the United States, and China.

== Diplomatic missions ==
Argentina has an embassy in Berlin and Consulates-General in Frankfurt and Hamburg. Germany has an embassy in Buenos Aires.

== Cultural relations ==
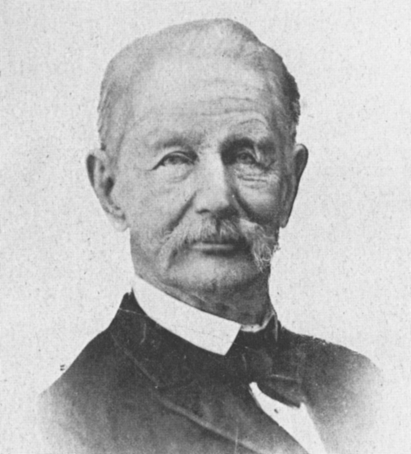
Hermann Burmeister was a prolific Argentine-German naturalist, paleontologist and zoologist, founder of the National Academy of Sciences of Argentina.

Famous German-Argentine scientists, architects, artist, musicians and writers:

- Carlos Berg, naturalist and entomologist.
- Silvio Gesell, theoretical economist, social activist.
- Johannes Franz Hartmann, physicist and astronomer. He was the director of the La Plata Astronomical Observatory.
- Eduardo Ladislao Holmberg, natural historian and novelist.
- Alejandro Korn, physician, psychiatrist, philosopher, reformist and politician.
- Otto Krause, engineer and educator.
- Federico Kurtz, botanist.
- Paul Günther Lorentz, botanist.
- Raúl Prebisch, economist known for his contributions to structuralist economics such as the Prebisch–Singer hypothesis, which formed the basis of economic dependency theory.
- Carlos Segers, astronomer. The crater Segers on the Moon is named after him.
- Friedrich Schickendantz, scientist who worked in the fields of mineralogy, chemistry, botany, geology, and meteorology.
- Alfred Wilhelm Stelzner, geologist.
- Annemarie Heinrich, photographer.
- Federico Lussenhoff, former footballer.
- Marcelo Bosch, rugby player.
- Liliana Heker, writer.
- Sebastian Spreng, visual artist and music journalist.
- Natty Hollmann, nominated for the Nobel Peace Prize on March 2, 2009.
- Federico Sturzenegger, Chairman of the Central Bank of Argentina.
- Margarita Stolbizer, politician.
- Francis Mallmann, celebrity chef.

=== Architecture ===
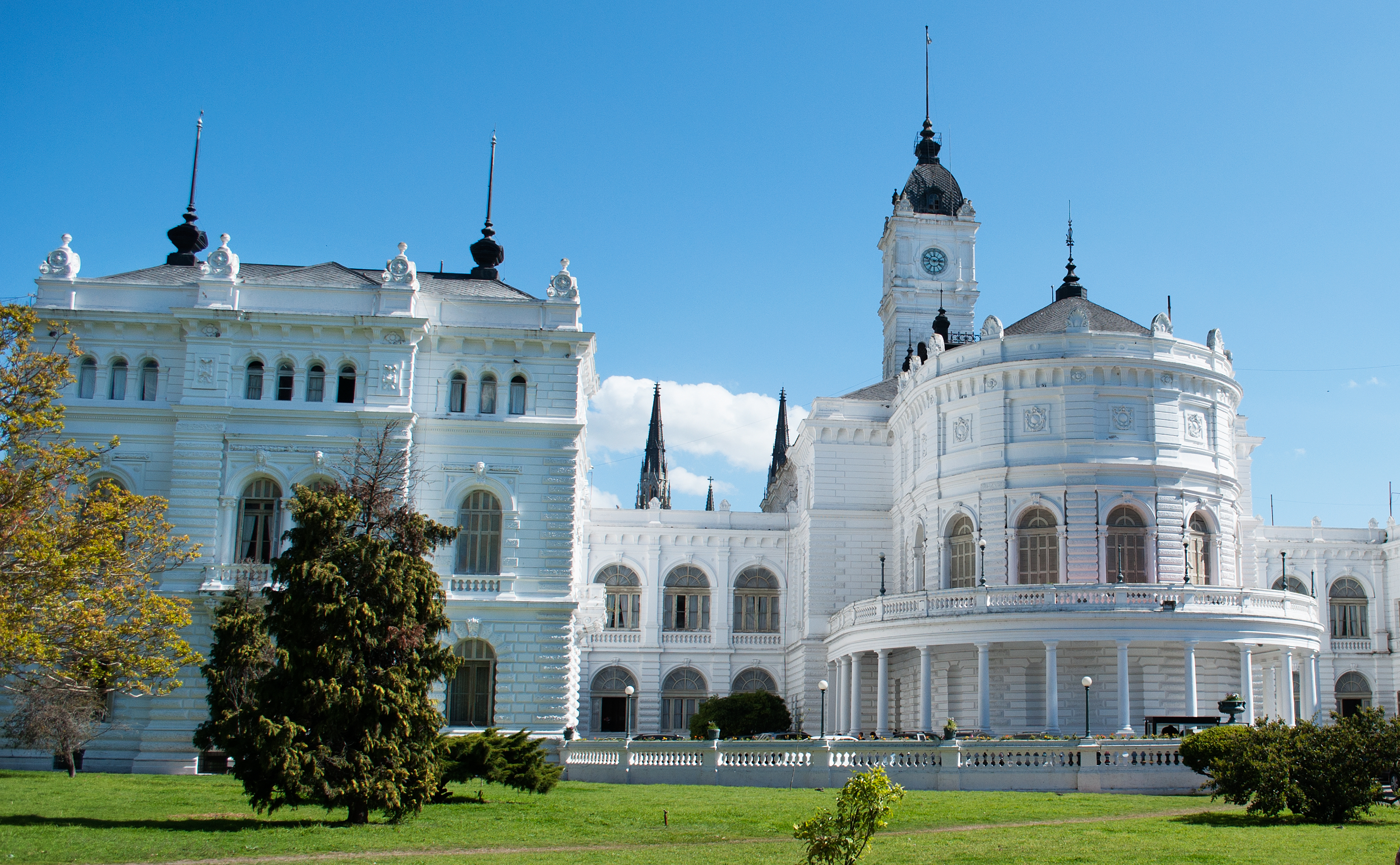
La Plata City Hall, eclecticist design based on German Renaissance Revival architecture.

The first German architects in Argentina were Jesuits who settled in the 18th century. For example, the oldest church preserved in Buenos Aires, the Church of San Ignacio, was built by a German John Krauss (1664-1714), who arrived in 1697. And they were followed by a lot of engineers and German architects who carried out many public works, ports, bridges, temples, schools, etc. to more recent lengthwise and widthwise of Argentina dates.

The former Hospital de Clínicas "José de San Martín" of the University of Buenos Aires was designed by a German architect Philip Schwarz, the city of La Plata was outlined by a German Carlos Glade. The Legislature of La Plata (1882) was designed by Gustav Heine and Georg Hagemann (architects from Hannover), to manage the site, sent Carlos Nordmann to Argentina. The municipality of the city itself was designed by Uberto Stier (architect in Hannover). Market Fruits of Avellaneda (152,000 meters square ), the largest wool- stock of the world, was built by German Fernando Moog, the same who later also designed the Odeon Theatre.

The Palace of Justice in La Plata was designed by Adolph Büttner, the Caraffa Fine Arts Museum of Cordoba was built by Juan Kronfuss and military facilities Campo de Mayo were built by the company Siemens Bauunion, like building State phones (Corrientes and Maipu, Buenos Aires). Passage Siemens, with access to the Avenida de Mayo, is a design by Hans Hertlein, while the Subway " A" ( 1913 ), the General Guemes Gallery ( 1915 ), the Central Post Office (1915), the refrigerator Armour La Plata (1916), the Colegio Nacional de Buenos Aires (1918 onwards), the Superior School of Commerce Carlos Pellegrini, the plant CADE Puerto Nuevo ( 925) and the Obelisk of Buenos Aires (1936) are works of the German company GEOPÉ, which German director was John Hartmann.

== Gallery ==
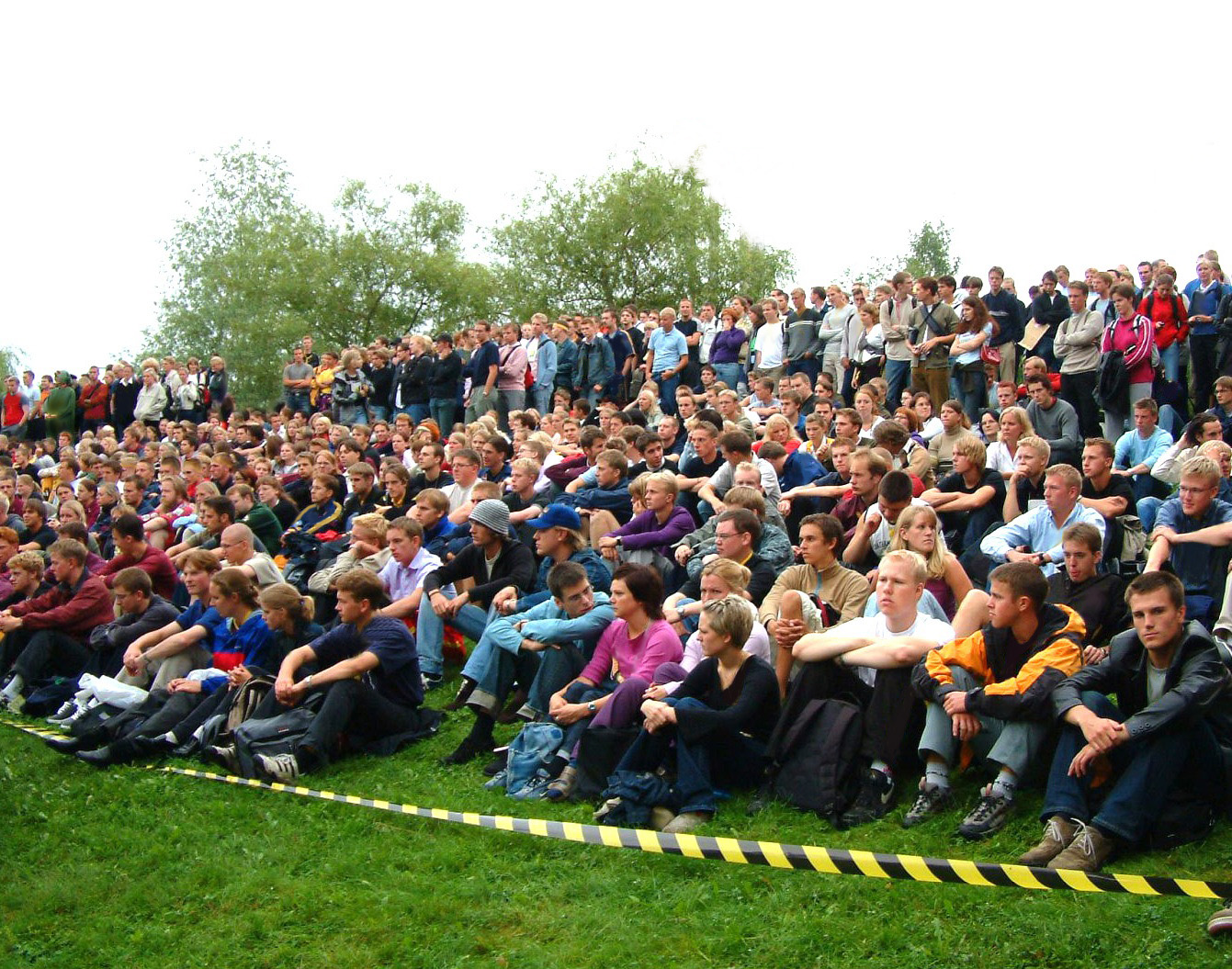
Meeting of Argentine people from German descent in Crespo, Entre Ríos.

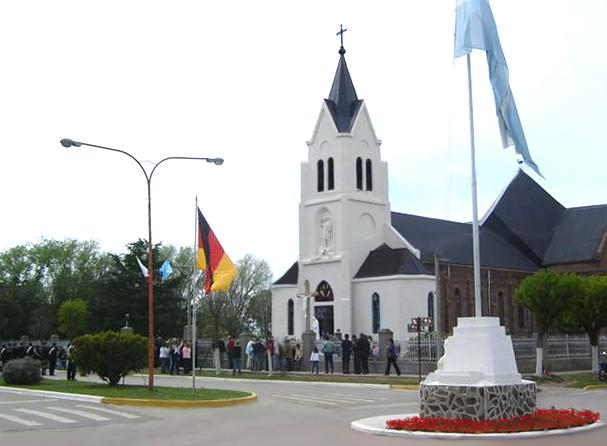
San Miguel Arcangel in Buenos Aires Province is an example of German colonisation, populated almost entirely by Volga Germans.

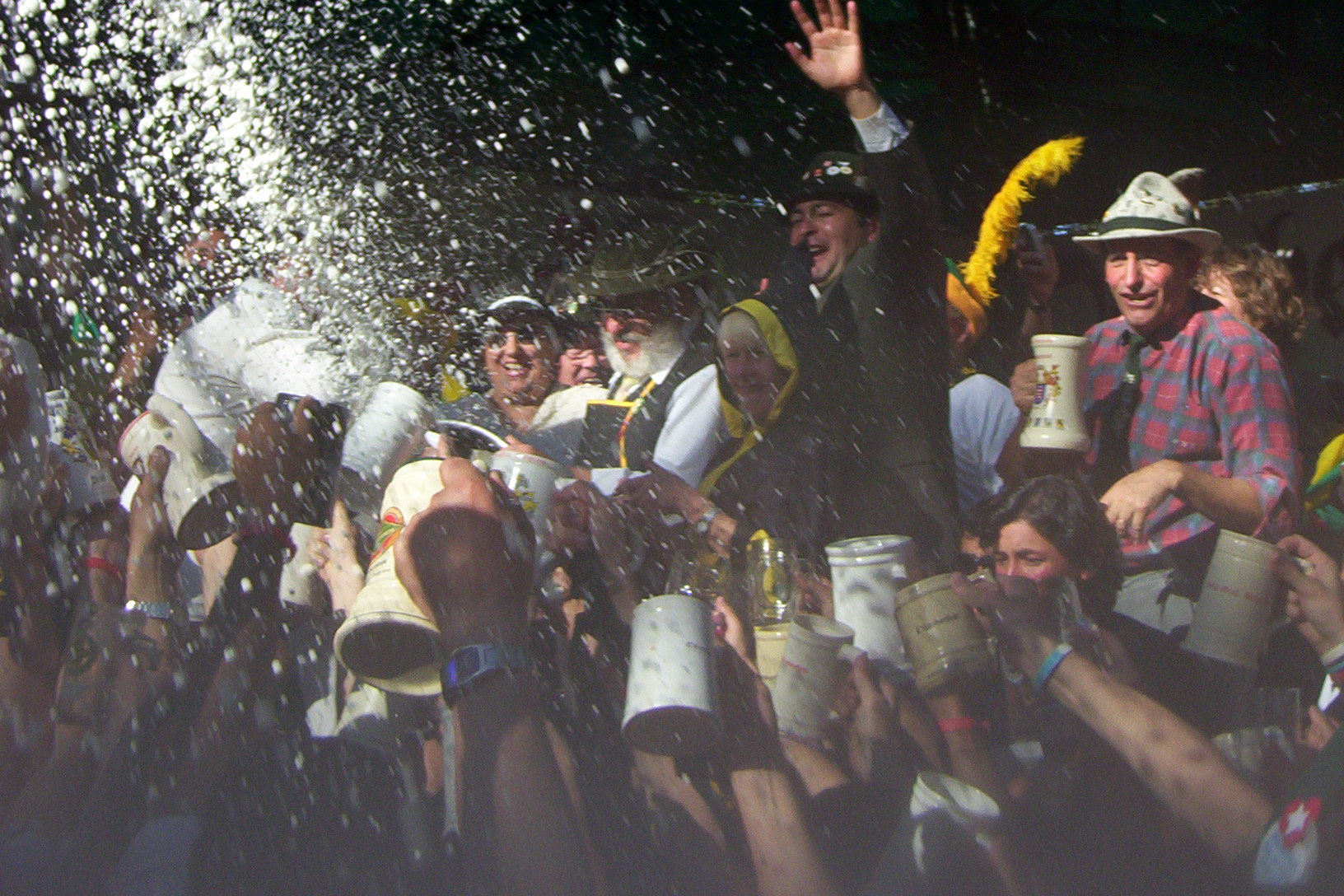
Oktoberfest in Villa General Belgrano.

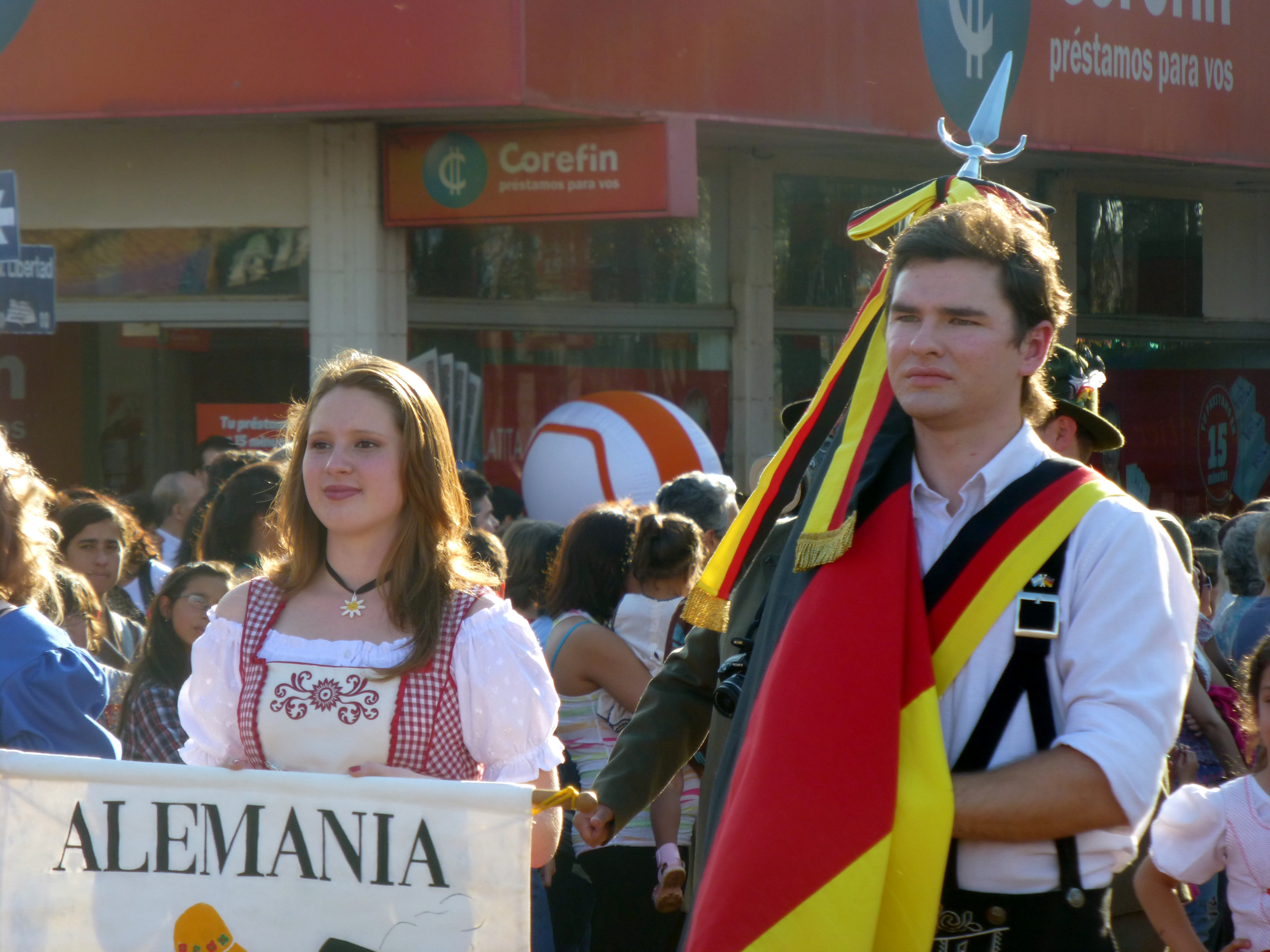
German Argentines.

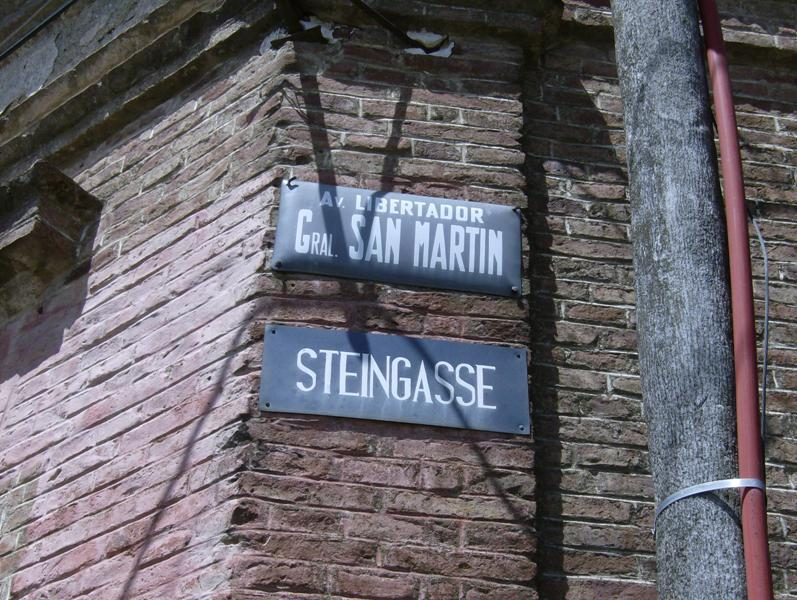
Bilingual street sign in San José, Coronel Suárez, Argentina (Volga German colony)

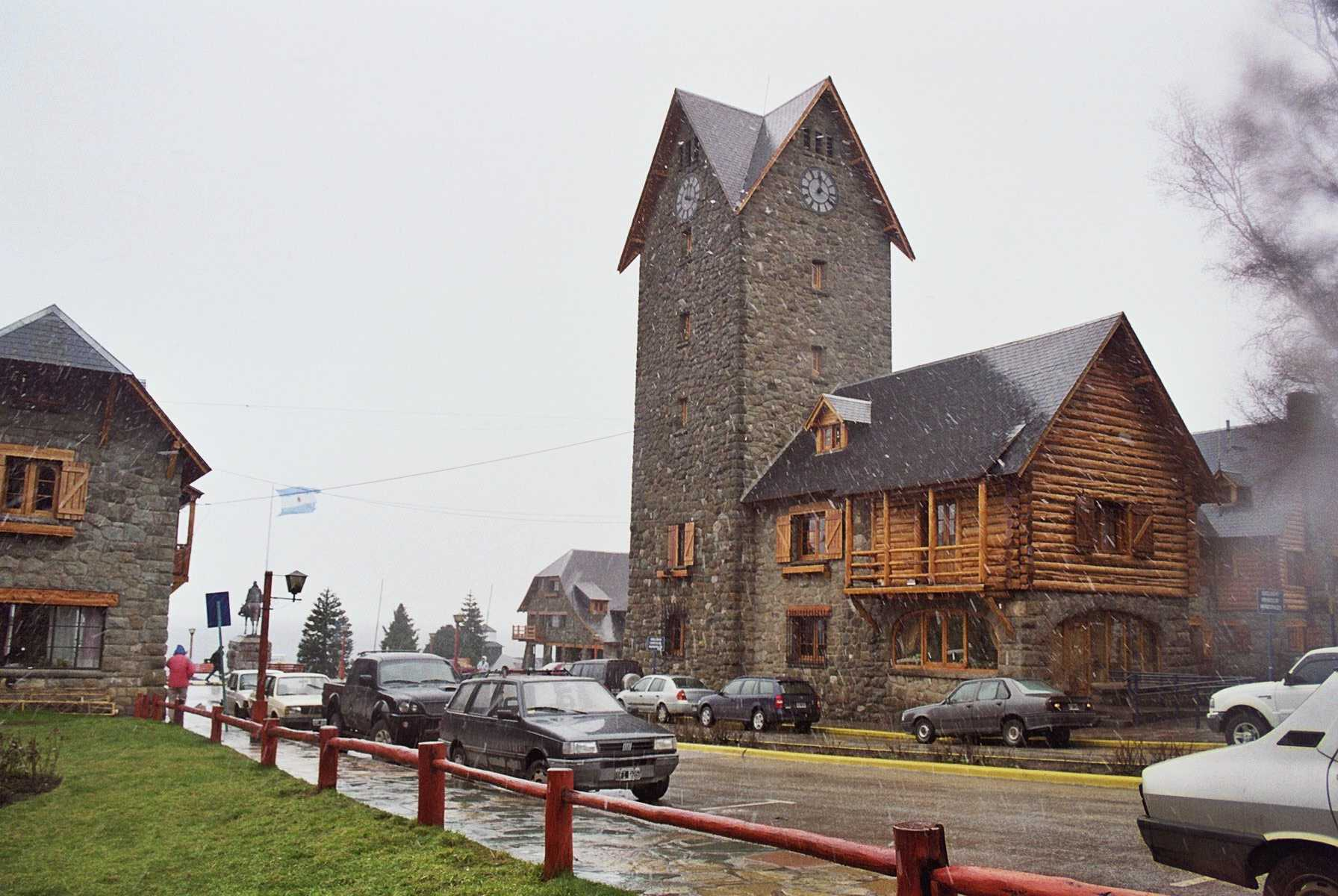
German style in the architecture of Bariloche.

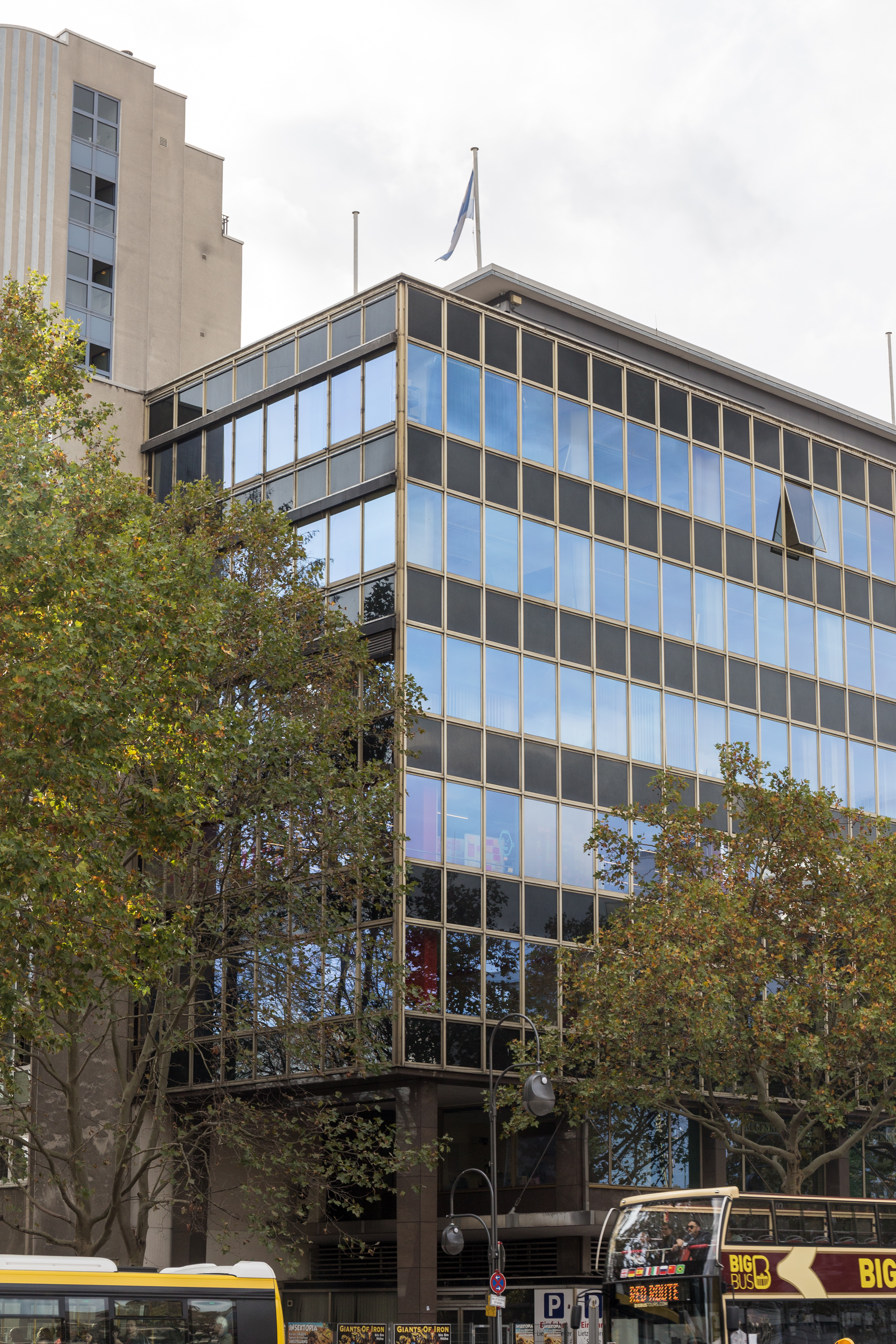
Embassy of Argentina in Berlin

== See also ==
- Foreign relations of Argentina
- Foreign relations of Germany
- German settlement in Argentina
