= 1779 Paraná =

Main-belt asteroid

Discovery
- Discovered by: M. Itzigsohn
- Discovery site: La Plata Obs.
- Discovery date: 15 June 1950

Designations
- Named after: Paraná River (South American river)
- Alternative designations: 1950 LZ · 1976 SF_{8} 6116 P-L
- Minor planet category: main-belt · (inner)

Orbital characteristics
- Epoch 4 September 2017 (JD 2458000.5)
- Uncertainty parameter 0
- Observation arc: 66.86 yr (24,422 days)
- Aphelion: 2.5262 AU
- Perihelion: 1.8249 AU
- Semi-major axis: 2.1755 AU
- Eccentricity: 0.1612
- Orbital period (sidereal): 3.21 yr (1,172 days)
- Mean anomaly: 344.02°
- Mean motion: 0° 18^{m} 25.92^{s} / day
- Inclination: 0.8987°
- Longitude of ascending node: 254.43°
- Argument of perihelion: 11.493°

Physical characteristics
- Dimensions: 4 km (calculated at 0.25); 4.085±0.223 km
- Geometric albedo: 0.221±0.023
- Absolute magnitude (H): 14.1

1779 Paraná, provisional designation 1950 LZ, is an asteroid from the inner regions of the asteroid belt, approximately 4 kilometers in diameter.

The asteroid was discovered on 15 June 1950, by Argentine astronomer Miguel Itzigsohn at the La Plata Astronomical Observatory in La Plata, capital of the province of Buenos Aires. It was named for the Paraná River in South America.

== Orbit and classification ==
Paraná orbits the Sun in the inner main-belt at a distance of 1.8–2.5 AU once every 3 years and 3 months (1,172 days). Its orbit has an eccentricity of 0.16 and an inclination of 1° with respect to the ecliptic.

As no precoveries were taken, and no prior identifications were made, Paraná's observation arc begins with its official discovery observation in 1950. Paraná has also been cataloged by the Palomar–Leiden survey and received the survey designation 6116 P-L (PLS6116).

== Physical characteristics ==
=== Diameter and albedo ===
According to the survey carried out by NASA's Wide-field Infrared Survey Explorer with its subsequent NEOWISE mission, Paraná measures 4.09 kilometers in diameter and its surface has an albedo of 0.221. Based on a magnitude-to-diameter conversion, using an albedo in the range of 0.05 to 0.25 and a magnitude of 14.1, the asteroid's generic diameter is between 4 and 9 kilometers.

=== Rotation period ===
As of 2017, Paraná's spectral type, rotation period and shape remain unknown.

== Naming ==
This minor planet was named for a large and 4,880-kilometers long Paraná River that runs through northern Argentina, Brazil and Paraguay. It is a major tributary to the La Plata river, where the city of La Plata and the discovering observatory are located (also see 1029 La Plata). The official naming citation was published by the Minor Planet Center on 8 April 1982 (M.P.C. 6832).
