= 1688 Wilkens =

Main-belt asteroid

Discovery
- Discovered by: M. Itzigsohn
- Discovery site: La Plata Obs.
- Discovery date: 3 March 1951

Designations
- Named after: Alexander Wilkens (German astronomer)
- Alternative designations: 1951 EQ_{1} · 1964 JC
- Minor planet category: main-belt · (middle); Mitidika

Orbital characteristics
- Epoch 4 September 2017 (JD 2458000.5)
- Uncertainty parameter 0
- Observation arc: 66.05 yr (24,123 days)
- Aphelion: 3.2511 AU
- Perihelion: 1.9834 AU
- Semi-major axis: 2.6173 AU
- Eccentricity: 0.2422
- Orbital period (sidereal): 4.23 yr (1,547 days)
- Mean anomaly: 158.97°
- Mean motion: 0° 13^{m} 58.08^{s} / day
- Inclination: 11.763°
- Longitude of ascending node: 245.77°
- Argument of perihelion: 42.399°

Physical characteristics
- Dimensions: 12.12 km (calculated); 16.239±0.118 km 16.82±0.29 km
- Synodic rotation period: 7.248±0.001 h 7.3017±0.0676 h
- Geometric albedo: 0.044±0.005; 0.066±0.003; 0.10 (assumed)
- Spectral type: S (assumed)
- Absolute magnitude (H): 12.50 · 12.7 · 12.91±0.45 · 12.953±0.002 (S)

1688 Wilkens, provisional designation 1951 EQ_{1}, is a Mitidika asteroid from the central region of the asteroid belt, approximately 16 kilometers in diameter. It was discovered on 3 March 1951, by Argentine astronomer Miguel Itzigsohn at La Plata Observatory in the Province of Buenos Aires, Argentina, and named after astronomer Alexander Wilkens.

== Classification and orbit ==
Wilkens has been identified as a member of the Mitidika family, a dispersed asteroid family of typically carbonaceous C-type asteroids. The family is named after 2262 Mitidika (diameter of 9 km) and consists of 653 known members, the largest ones being 404 Arsinoë (95 km) and 5079 Brubeck (17 km).

It orbits the Sun in the central main-belt at a distance of 2.0–3.3 AU once every 4 years and 3 months (1,547 days). Its orbit has an eccentricity of 0.24 and an inclination of 12° with respect to the ecliptic. As no precoveries were taken, and no prior identifications were made, Wilkens' observation arc begins with its official discovery observation in 1951.

== Physical characteristics ==
=== Rotation period ===
In July 2007, astronomer Lorenzo Franco obtained a rotational lightcurve of Wilkens at the Balzaretto Observatory (A81) near Rome, Italy. It gave a well-defined period of 7.248 hours and a brightness variation of 0.23 magnitude (U=3). Photometric observations in the S-band at the Palomar Transient Factory in January 2014, gave a period of 7.3017 hours with an amplitude of 0.34 (U=2).

=== Diameter and albedo ===
According to the surveys carried out by the Japanese Akari satellite and NASA's Wide-field Infrared Survey Explorer with its subsequent NEOWISE mission, Wilkens measures 16.23 and 16.82 kilometers in diameter, and its surface has an albedo of 0.044 and 0.066, respectively. The Collaborative Asteroid Lightcurve Link assumes an albedo of 0.10 and calculates a diameter of 12.12 kilometers based on an absolute magnitude of 12.7.

== Naming ==
This minor planet was named for German astronomer Alexander Wilkens (1881–1968), researcher in many branches of astronomy, most notably celestial mechanics. After having worked for many years in Germany, he trained two generations of celestial mechanicians at the discovering La Plata Observatory before returning to his native country. The official naming citation was published by the Minor Planet Center on 1 August 1980 (M.P.C. 5449).
