= 1582 Martir =

Carbonaceous background asteroid

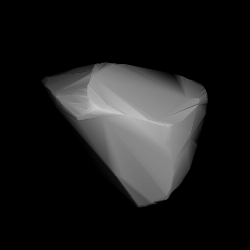
- Shape model of Martir from its lightcurve

Discovery
- Discovered by: M. Itzigsohn
- Discovery site: La Plata Obs.
- Discovery date: 15 June 1950

Designations
- Named after: Eva Perón (First Lady of Argentina)
- Alternative designations: 1950 LY
- Minor planet category: main-belt · (outer)

Orbital characteristics
- Epoch 4 September 2017 (JD 2458000.5)
- Uncertainty parameter 0
- Observation arc: 67.05 yr (24,490 days)
- Aphelion: 3.5573 AU
- Perihelion: 2.7521 AU
- Semi-major axis: 3.1547 AU
- Eccentricity: 0.1276
- Orbital period (sidereal): 5.60 yr (2,047 days)
- Mean anomaly: 29.638°
- Mean motion: 0° 10^{m} 33.24^{s} / day
- Inclination: 11.608°
- Longitude of ascending node: 93.914°
- Argument of perihelion: 128.10°

Physical characteristics
- Dimensions: 34.42±10.19 km 36.32±0.56 km 36.69 km (derived); 36.79±2.6 km 37.06±12.76 km 37.252±0.111 km 39.47±0.46 km 39.969±0.292 km
- Synodic rotation period: 9.84±0.01 h (Note: Lightcurve plot of 1582 Martir, Palmer Divide Observatory, B. D. Warner (2000), reviewed period of 9.84 hours); 15.665±0.004 h (dated); 15.757±0.005 h (dated)
- Geometric albedo: 0.038±0.010; 0.04±0.03; 0.0435 (derived); 0.0483±0.0057; 0.05±0.04; 0.054±0.008; 0.0570±0.009; 0.060±0.002
- Spectral type: C
- Absolute magnitude (H): 10.90 · 11.20 · 11.26 · 11.3 · 11.35±0.29

1582 Martir, provisional designation 1950 LY, is a carbonaceous background asteroid from the outer regions of the asteroid belt, approximately 37 kilometers in diameter. It was discovered on 15 June 1950, by Argentine astronomer Miguel Itzigsohn at the La Plata Astronomical Observatory in Argentina. The asteroid was named after the First Lady of Argentina, Eva Perón.

== Orbit and classification ==
Martir is a background asteroid that does not belong to any known asteroid family. It orbits the Sun in the outer main-belt at a distance of 2.8–3.6 AU once every 5 years and 7 months (2,047 days). Its orbit has an eccentricity of 0.13 and an inclination of 12° with respect to the ecliptic. The body's observation arc begins at the discovering observatory with its official discovery observation.

== Physical characteristics ==
Martir has been characterized as a carbonaceous C-type asteroid by PanSTARRS photometric survey.

=== Rotation period ===
In May 2000, a rotational lightcurve of Martir was obtained from photometric observations by American astronomer Brian Warner at his Palmer Divide Observatory (716) in Colorado. After a review of the previous lightcurve analysis, a half-period solution with a fit on a monomodal lightcurve gave a revised rotation period of 9.84 hours with a brightness amplitude of 0.31 magnitude (U=2). This result supersedes two previous analysis that gave a period of 15.665 and 15.757 hours.

=== Diameter and albedo ===
According to the surveys carried out by the Infrared Astronomical Satellite IRAS, the Japanese Akari satellite and the NEOWISE mission of NASA's Wide-field Infrared Survey Explorer, Martir measures between 34.42 and 39.969 kilometers in diameter and its surface has an albedo between 0.038 and 0.060.

The Collaborative Asteroid Lightcurve Link derives an albedo of 0.0435 and a diameter of 36.69 kilometers based on an absolute magnitude of 11.2.

== Naming ==
This minor planet was named in homage to the First Lady of Argentina, Eva Perón (1919–1952). The name translates from Spanish to "martyr" and refers to her efforts towards social justice. The official naming citation was published by the Minor Planet Center in January 1953 (M.P.C. 877). The discoverer also named the asteroids 1569 Evita, 1581 Abanderada, 1588 Descamisada and 1589 Fanatica in tribute to Perón.
