= 965 Angelica =

Large background asteroid

Discovery
- Discovered by: J. F. Hartmann
- Discovery site: La Plata Obs.
- Discovery date: 4 November 1921

Designations
- Named after: Angelica Hartmann (discoverer's wife)
- Alternative designations: A921 VB · 1921 KT; 1977 PM_{2}
- Minor planet category: main-belt · (outer) background

Orbital characteristics
- Epoch 31 May 2020 (JD 2459000.5)
- Uncertainty parameter 0
- Observation arc: 91.66 yr (33,480 d)
- Aphelion: 4.0444 AU
- Perihelion: 2.2703 AU
- Semi-major axis: 3.1574 AU
- Eccentricity: 0.2809
- Orbital period (sidereal): 5.61 yr (2,049 d)
- Mean anomaly: 162.59°
- Mean motion: 0° 10^{m} 32.52^{s} / day
- Inclination: 21.428°
- Longitude of ascending node: 41.432°
- Argument of perihelion: 47.020°
- T_{Jupiter}: 3.0400

Physical characteristics
- Mean diameter: 53.63±1.3 km; 60.857±0.198 km; 64.11±0.74 km
- Synodic rotation period: 26.752±0.035 h
- Geometric albedo: 0.052±0.002; 0.058±0.007; 0.0739±0.004
- Spectral type: SMASS = Xc; V–R = 0.386±0.005
- Absolute magnitude (H): 10.2

965 Angelica (prov. designation: A921 VB or 1921 KT), is a large background asteroid from the outer regions of the asteroid belt, approximately 60 kilometers (37 miles) in diameter. It was discovered on 4 November 1921, by astronomer Johannes F. Hartmann at the La Plata Astronomical Observatory in Argentina. The dark X-type asteroid (Xc) with a low T_{Jupiter} has a rotation period of 26.8 hours and is likely spherical in shape. It was named after the discoverer's wife, Angelica Hartmann.

== Orbit and classification ==
Angelica is a non-family asteroid of the main belt's background population when applying the hierarchical clustering method to its proper orbital elements. It orbits the Sun in the outer asteroid belt at a distance of 2.3–4.0 AU once every 5 years and 7 months (2,049 days; semi-major axis of 3.16 AU). Its orbit has an eccentricity of 0.28 and an inclination of 21° with respect to the ecliptic. Due to this relatively high inclination and eccentricity, Angelica has a Jupiter Tisserand's parameter just barely above 3, which is commonly used as the threshold to distinguish between the populations of asteroids and Jupiter-family comets. The body's observation arc begins at Heidelberg Observatory in December 1927, or six years after its official discovery observation at the La Plata Astronomical Observatory.

== Naming ==
This minor planet was named after Angelica Hartmann, wife of German astronomer Johannes F. Hartmann, who discovered this asteroid. The naming was mentioned in The Names of the Minor Planets by Paul Herget in 1955 (H 92).

== Physical characteristics ==
In the Bus–Binzel SMASS classification, Angelica is a Xc subtype, that transitions from the X-types to the carbonaceous C-type asteroids.

=== Rotation period ===
During five nights in December 2017, a rotational lightcurve of Angelica was obtained from photometric observations by Tom Polakis at the Command Module Observatory (V02) in Tempe, Arizona. Lightcurve analysis gave a rotation period of 26.752±0.035 hours with a very low brightness variation of 0.08±0.01 magnitude (U=3−), which is indicative of regular, spherical shape.

Another observation from January 2018, by Brigitte Montminy and Katherine McDonald at Minnetonka High School, and Russell Durkee at the Shed of Science Observatory (H39) in Minnetonka, Minnesota, determined a concurring period of 26.63±0.03 hours with an amplitude of 0.12±0.02 magnitude (U=2+). Federico Manzini at the Sozzago Astronomical Station (A12) obtained the object's first lightcurve in December 2006, measuring a period of 17.772±0.007 hours and an amplitude 0.06±0.01 magnitude (U=2).

=== Diameter and albedo ===
According to the surveys carried out by the Infrared Astronomical Satellite IRAS, the NEOWISE mission of NASA's Wide-field Infrared Survey Explorer (WISE), and the Japanese Akari satellite, Angelica measures 53.63±1.3, 60.857±0.198 and 64.11±0.74 kilometers in diameter, and its surface has an albedo of 0.0739±0.004, 0.058±0.007 and 0.052±0.002, respectively. Earlier published measurements by the WISE team gives larger mean diameter of 71.59±0.55 km and 76.741±0.994 km. The Collaborative Asteroid Lightcurve Link derives an albedo of 0.0515 and a diameter of 53.39 km based on an absolute magnitude of 10.2.
