= 4756 Asaramas =

Minor planet

Discovery
- Discovered by: La Plata Obs.
- Discovery site: La Plata Obs.
- Discovery date: 21 April 1950

Designations
- Named after: Asociación Argentina Amigos de la Astronomía (astronomical association)
- Alternative designations: 1950 HJ · 1976 FD; 1983 RH_{9}
- Minor planet category: main-belt · Eos

Orbital characteristics
- Epoch 4 September 2017 (JD 2458000.5)
- Uncertainty parameter 0
- Observation arc: 66.94 yr (24,449 days)
- Aphelion: 3.2128 AU
- Perihelion: 2.8233 AU
- Semi-major axis: 3.0180 AU
- Eccentricity: 0.0645
- Orbital period (sidereal): 5.24 yr (1,915 days)
- Mean anomaly: 262.30°
- Mean motion: 0° 11^{m} 16.8^{s} / day
- Inclination: 9.2037°
- Longitude of ascending node: 239.42°
- Argument of perihelion: 2.4305°

Physical characteristics
- Dimensions: 10.78 km (calculated); 11.644±0.215 km
- Synodic rotation period: 16.536±0.0087 h
- Geometric albedo: 0.14 (assumed); 0.188±0.025
- Spectral type: L · S
- Absolute magnitude (H): 11.78±0.06 · 12.10 · 12.140±0.002 (R) · 12.2 · 12.59

4756 Asaramas, provisional designation 1950 HJ, is a stony rare-type Eoan asteroid from the outer region of the asteroid belt, approximately 11 kilometers in diameter. It was discovered on 21 April 1950, by astronomers at the La Plata Astronomical Observatory in Argentina. It is named for the astronomical society Asociación Argentina Amigos de la Astronomía.

== Classification and orbit ==
Asaramas is a member of the Eos family (606), the largest asteroid family in the outer main belt consisting of nearly 10,000 asteroids. It orbits the Sun at a distance of 2.8–3.2 AU once every 5 years and 3 months (1,915 days). Its orbit has an eccentricity of 0.06 and an inclination of 9° with respect to the ecliptic.

As no precoveries were taken and no prior identifications were made, the body's observation arc begins with its official discovery observation at La Plata.

== Physical characteristics ==
Asaramas has been characterized as a L-type asteroid by PanSTARRS' photometric survey.

=== Rotation period ===
In November 2010, a rotational lightcurve of Asaramas was obtained from photometric observations in the R-band at the Palomar Transient Factory in California. Lightcurve analysis gave a typical rotation period of 16.536 hours with a brightness variation of 0.16 magnitude (U=2).

=== Diameter and albedo ===
According to the survey carried out by NASA's Wide-field Infrared Survey Explorer with its subsequent NEOWISE mission, Asaramas measures 11.64 kilometers in diameter and its surface has an albedo of 0.188, while the Collaborative Asteroid Lightcurve Link assumes a standard albedo for Eoan asteroids of 0.14 and calculates a diameter of 10.78 kilometers, based on an absolute magnitude of 12.59.

== Naming ==
This minor planet was named in honor of the Asociación Argentina Amigos de la Astronomía (A.A.A.A or Asaramas), an astronomical society for amateur astronomers in Argentina. Founded on 4 January 1929, the A.A.A.A. was the first contact with astronomy for a large number of professional astronomers at the La Plata Observatory. The official naming citation was published by the Minor Planet Center on 1 September 1993 (M.P.C. 22503).
