= 1684 Iguassú =

Main-belt asteroid

Discovery
- Discovered by: M. Itzigsohn
- Discovery site: La Plata Obs.
- Discovery date: 23 August 1951

Designations
- Named after: Iguazu Falls (South America)
- Alternative designations: 1951 QE · 1934 LN; 1935 SK_{1} · 1939 HK; 1949 DE · 1950 JT; 1965 AA_{1} · A922 DA
- Minor planet category: main-belt · (outer)

Orbital characteristics
- Epoch 4 September 2017 (JD 2458000.5)
- Uncertainty parameter 0
- Observation arc: 94.75 yr (34,606 days)
- Aphelion: 3.4852 AU
- Perihelion: 2.7109 AU
- Semi-major axis: 3.0980 AU
- Eccentricity: 0.1250
- Orbital period (sidereal): 5.45 yr (1,992 days)
- Mean anomaly: 113.36°
- Mean motion: 0° 10^{m} 50.52^{s} / day
- Inclination: 3.6665°
- Longitude of ascending node: 105.40°
- Argument of perihelion: 154.27°

Physical characteristics
- Dimensions: 30.210±0.321; 30.5±3.0 km 30.62 km (calculated); 31.381±0.336 km
- Synodic rotation period: 9.1423±0.0033 h 9.230±0.170 h
- Geometric albedo: 0.057 (assumed); 0.08±0.02; 0.0859±0.0064; 0.093±0.009
- Spectral type: C
- Absolute magnitude (H): 10.700±0.140 (R) · 10.8 · 10.848±0.001 (R) · 10.90 · 10.91±0.21 · 11.0 · 11.3

1684 Iguassú, provisional designation 1951 QE, is a carbonaceous asteroid from the outer region of the asteroid belt, approximately 30.5 kilometers in diameter. It was discovered on 23 August 1951, by Argentine astronomer Miguel Itzigsohn at the La Plata Astronomical Observatory, located in the city of La Plata, Argentina. It was named after the Iguazu Falls in South America.

== Orbit and classification ==
The asteroid orbits the Sun in the outer main-belt at a distance of 2.7–3.5 AU once every 5 years and 5 months (1,992 days). Its orbit has an eccentricity of 0.13 and an inclination of 4° with respect to the ecliptic.

== Physical characteristics ==
Iguassú is characterized as a carbonaceous C-type asteroid.

=== Rotation period ===
In January 2014, two rotational lightcurves of Iguassú were obtained at the Palomar Transient Factory in California. They gave a rotation period of 9.14 and 9.23 hours, respectively, both with a brightness change of 0.15 in magnitude (U=2/2).

=== Diameter and albedo ===
According to the survey carried out by NASA's Wide-field Infrared Survey Explorer with its subsequent NEOWISE mission, Iguassú measures between 30.21 and 31.38 kilometers in diameter, and its surface has an albedo between 0.08 and 0.093. The Collaborative Asteroid Lightcurve Link assumes a standard albedo for carbonaceous asteroids of 0.057 and calculates a diameter of 30.62 kilometers based on an absolute magnitude of 11.3.

== Naming ==
This minor planet is named for the large Iguazu Falls, a 60 meters high and 1 kilometer wide waterfall, which river of the same name marks part of the boundary between Argentina and Brazil. As a curiosity, the spelling of the minor planet's name (Iguassú) neither concurs with the Spanish "Iguazú" nor with the Portuguese "Iguaçu". It is rather similar to "Yguasu", used in the native Guarani language, from which the waterfall's name originates. The official naming citation was published by the Minor Planet Center on 8 April 1982 (M.P.C. 6832).
