= 1588 Descamisada =

Main-belt asteroid

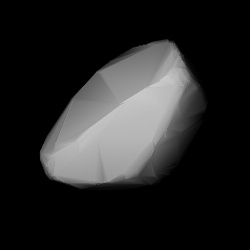
- Descamisada modeled from its lightcurve

Discovery
- Discovered by: M. Itzigsohn
- Discovery site: La Plata Obs.
- Discovery date: 27 June 1951

Designations
- Named after: Eva Perón (Argentine idol)
- Alternative designations: 1951 MH
- Minor planet category: main-belt · (outer); Eos

Orbital characteristics
- Epoch 4 September 2017 (JD 2458000.5)
- Uncertainty parameter 0
- Observation arc: 65.75 yr (24,017 days)
- Aphelion: 3.2477 AU
- Perihelion: 2.8073 AU
- Semi-major axis: 3.0275 AU
- Eccentricity: 0.0727
- Orbital period (sidereal): 5.27 yr (1,924 days)
- Mean anomaly: 141.67°
- Mean motion: 0° 11^{m} 13.56^{s} / day
- Inclination: 11.268°
- Longitude of ascending node: 98.591°
- Argument of perihelion: 224.93°

Physical characteristics
- Dimensions: 17.541±0.174; 25±11 km (generic)
- Geometric albedo: 0.141±0.014
- Absolute magnitude (H): 11.3

1588 Descamisada, provisional designation 1951 MH, is an Eos asteroid from the outer region of the asteroid belt, approximately 18 kilometers in diameter. It was discovered on 27 June 1951, by astronomer Miguel Itzigsohn at the La Plata Astronomical Observatory in La Plata, Argentina, and named in honor of Eva Perón.

== Orbit and classification ==
Descamisada is a member of the Eos family (606), the largest asteroid family in the outer main belt consisting of nearly 10,000 asteroids. It orbits the Sun in the outer main-belt at a distance of 2.8–3.2 AU once every 5 years and 3 months (1,924 days). Its orbit has an eccentricity of 0.07 and an inclination of 11° with respect to the ecliptic. Descamisada's observation arc begins with its official discovery observation, as no precoveries were taken and no prior identifications were made.

== Physical characteristics ==
According to the surveys carried out by NASA's Wide-field Infrared Survey Explorer with its subsequent NEOWISE mission, Descamisada measures 17.54 kilometers in diameter and its surface has an albedo of 0.141. A magnitude-to-diameter conversion, gives a diameter between 14 and 36 kilometers for an assumed albedo in the range of 0.05–0.25 and an absolute magnitude of 11.3.

As of 2017, Descamisada's spectral type, rotation period and shape remain unknown.

== Naming ==
This minor planet was named for Eva Perón and its name is a feminized form of "descamisado" (shirtless one) – a term used to denote the working class citizens which formed the support base of Peronism. Eva Perón, also known as "Evita", was the wife of Argentine President Juan Perón, First Lady of Argentina and idolized by millions. The official naming citation was published by the Minor Planet Center in April 1954 (M.P.C. 1069). The asteroids 1569 Evita, 1581 Abanderada, 1582 Martir and 1589 Fanatica were also discovered by Itzigsohn, and were also given names in tribute to Perón.
