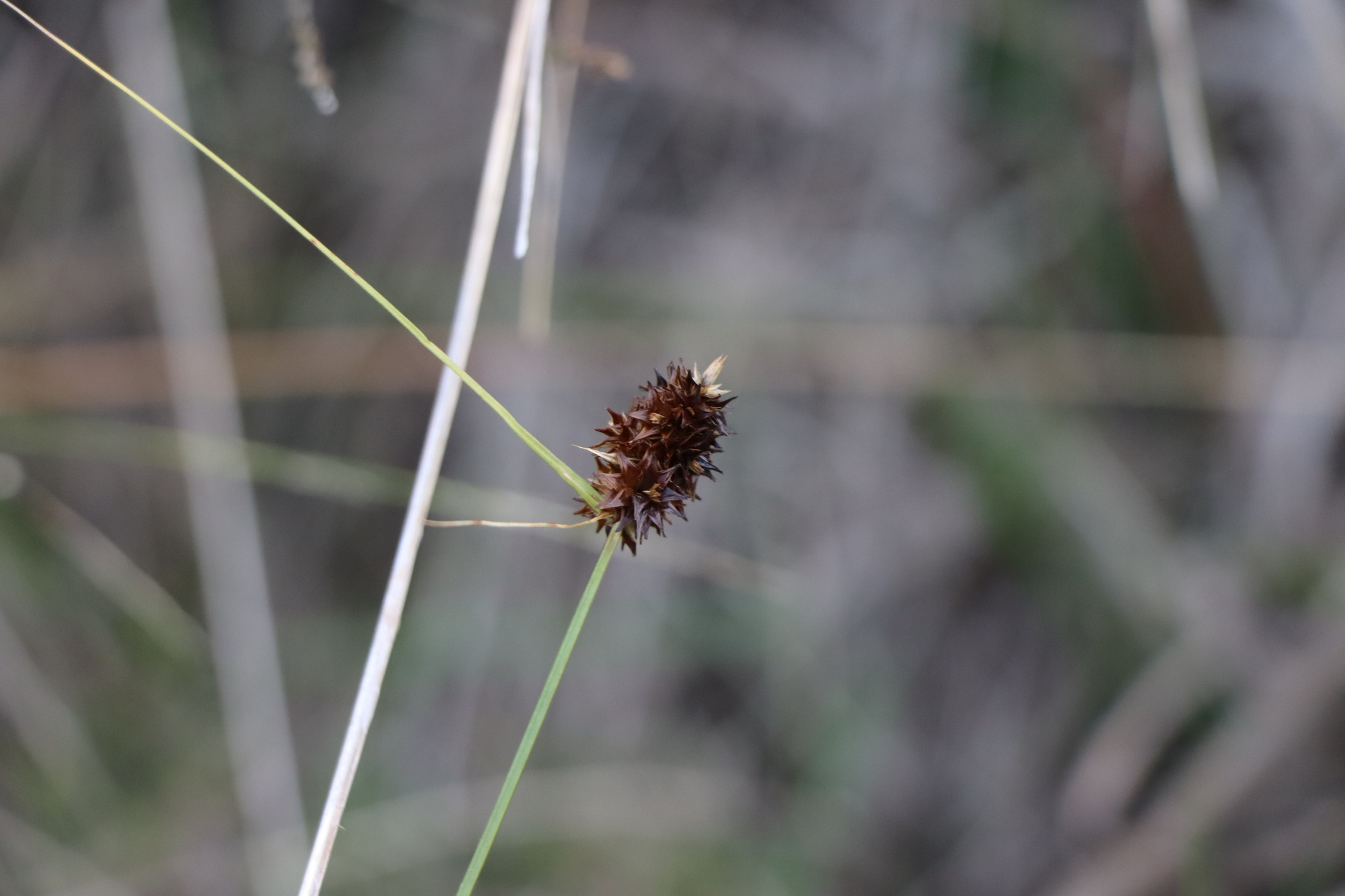

Scientific classification
- Kingdom: Plantae
- Clade: Tracheophytes
- Clade: Angiosperms
- Clade: Monocots
- Clade: Commelinids
- Order: Poales
- Family: Cyperaceae
- Genus: Carex
- Species: C. uruguensis

Binomial name
- Carex uruguensis Boeckeler

= Carex uruguensis =

Species of plant

Carex uruguensis is a tussock-forming species of perennial sedge in the family Cyperaceae. It is native to parts of South America.

== Description ==
The sedge has a short rhizome and can form many stems from the same root. The stem is circular to triangular in cross section that tapers along its length and has flat leaves. The inflorescence is in the form of a loose spike arrangement with most of the spikelets situated close to the centre of the body near the point of attachment.

== Taxonomy ==
The species was first described by the botanist Johann Otto Boeckeler in 1886 as a part of the work Botanische Jahrbücher für Systematik, Pflanzengeschichte und Pflanzengeographie from the type specimen collected by Paul Günther Lorentz in 1875 in Uruguay. There are five synonyms;

- Carex sororia subsp. uruguensis (Boeckeler) Luceño & M.Alves
- Carex involucrata var. angustata Kük.
- Carex pseudoechinata Boeckeler
- Carex uruguensis var. angustata (Kük.) Kük.
- Carex uruguensis var. pseudoechinata (Boeckeler) Kük.

== Distribution ==
The plant is found in subtropical biomes with a range that extends from southern Brazil through Uruguay and into northern Argentina.

== See also ==
- List of Carex species
