= 1581 Abanderada =

Themistian asteroid

Discovery
- Discovered by: M. Itzigsohn
- Discovery site: La Plata Obs.
- Discovery date: 15 June 1950

Designations
- Named after: Eva Perón (First Lady of Argentina)
- Alternative designations: 1950 LA_{1} · 1927 JD; 1929 TY · 1943 EK; 1949 FM_{1} · 1949 FQ; 1949 FY · 1966 FP; 1975 YH
- Minor planet category: main-belt · (outer); Themis

Orbital characteristics
- Epoch 4 September 2017 (JD 2458000.5)
- Uncertainty parameter 0
- Observation arc: 87.67 yr (32,023 days)
- Aphelion: 3.5492 AU
- Perihelion: 2.7650 AU
- Semi-major axis: 3.1571 AU
- Eccentricity: 0.1242
- Orbital period (sidereal): 5.61 yr (2,049 days)
- Mean anomaly: 40.223°
- Mean motion: 0° 10^{m} 32.52^{s} / day
- Inclination: 2.5388°
- Longitude of ascending node: 104.82°
- Argument of perihelion: 90.216°

Physical characteristics
- Dimensions: 29.508±0.195 km 29.722±0.184 km 31.74±15.01 km 36.49±0.64 km 39.28 km (SIMPS)
- Synodic rotation period: 19.2 h (very poor)
- Geometric albedo: 0.0523 (SIMPS); 0.06±0.07; 0.061±0.002; 0.0916±0.0170; 0.093±0.005
- Spectral type: Tholen = BCU; B–V = 0.659; U–B = 0.351
- Absolute magnitude (H): 10.85 · 11.00

1581 Abanderada, provisional designation 1950 LA_{1}, is a dark Themistian asteroid from the outer regions of the asteroid belt, approximately 35 kilometers in diameter. It was discovered on 15 June 1950, by Argentine astronomer Miguel Itzigsohn at the La Plata Astronomical Observatory in La Plata, Argentina. The asteroid was named after Eva Perón.

== Orbit and classification ==
Abanderada is a Themistian asteroid that belongs to the Themis family (602), a very large family of carbonaceous asteroids, named after 24 Themis. It orbits the Sun in the outer main-belt at a distance of 2.8–3.5 AU once every 5 years and 7 months (2,049 days). Its orbit has an eccentricity of 0.12 and an inclination of 3° with respect to the ecliptic.

The asteroid was first identified as 1927 JD at Simeiz Observatory in May 1927. The body's observation arc begins with a precovery image taken at Lowell Observatory in September 1929, or almost 21 years prior to its official discovery observation at La Plata.

== Physical characteristics ==
In the Tholen classification, the asteroid's spectral type is ambiguous. It is closest to a bright carbonaceous B-type and somewhat similar to the common C-type asteroids. Tholen has also flagged the asteroid's spectra as "unusual" (BCU).

=== Lightcurves ===
In March 2011, a rotational lightcurve of Abanderada was obtained from photometric observations by French amateur astronomers Pierre Antonini. The lightcurve with a period of 19.2 hours was later retracted due to its poor quality (U=n.a.). As of 2017, the body's effective rotation period, poles and shape remain unknown.

=== Diameter and albedo ===
According to the survey carried out by the NEOWISE mission of NASA's Wide-field Infrared Survey Explorer, Abanderada measures between 29.508 and 31.74 kilometers in diameter and its surface has an albedo between 0.06 and 0.093, while the Japanese Akari satellite found a diameter of 36.49 kilometers with an albedo of 0.061.

The Collaborative Asteroid Lightcurve Link adopts the results obtained by the Infrared Astronomical Satellite, that is, an albedo of 0.0523 and a diameter of 39.28 kilometers based on an absolute magnitude of 10.85.

== Naming ==
This minor planet was named in after Eva Perón (1919–1952), wife of President Juan Perón (1895–1974) of Argentina. The name "Abanderada" may be translated from Spanish as "woman with a banner"—an appellation frequently used in reference to her as a crusader for social and political change.

The discoverer also named the asteroids 1569 Evita, 1582 Martir, 1588 Descamisada and 1589 Fanatica in tribute to Eva Perón. The official naming citation was published by the Minor Planet Center in January 1953 (M.P.C. 877).
