= 1589 Fanatica =

Vestian asteroid

Discovery
- Discovered by: M. Itzigsohn
- Discovery site: La Plata Obs.
- Discovery date: 13 September 1950

Designations
- Named after: Eva Perón (Argentine idol)
- Alternative designations: 1950 RK · 1935 RD; 1937 CF · 1946 OE; 1950 TM_{3} · A924 WC
- Minor planet category: main-belt · Vestian

Orbital characteristics
- Epoch 4 September 2017 (JD 2458000.5)
- Uncertainty parameter 0
- Observation arc: 92.30 yr (33,713 days)
- Aphelion: 2.6415 AU
- Perihelion: 2.1918 AU
- Semi-major axis: 2.4167 AU
- Eccentricity: 0.0930
- Orbital period (sidereal): 3.76 yr (1,372 days)
- Mean anomaly: 268.75°
- Mean motion: 0° 15^{m} 44.28^{s} / day
- Inclination: 5.2629°
- Longitude of ascending node: 90.323°
- Argument of perihelion: 289.75°

Physical characteristics
- Dimensions: 9.31±0.40 km 10.698±0.125 km 11.446±0.086 km 12.16±0.76 km 12.39 km (calculated)
- Synodic rotation period: 2.58±0.05 h 2.582±0.001 h
- Geometric albedo: 0.189±0.025; 0.20 (assumed); 0.2609±0.0374; 0.294±0.012; 0.388±0.054
- Spectral type: S
- Absolute magnitude (H): 11.8 · 11.9 · 12.00

1589 Fanatica, provisional designation 1950 RK, is a stony, Vestian asteroid from the inner regions of the asteroid belt, approximately 11 kilometers in diameter. It was discovered on 13 September 1950, by Argentine astronomer Miguel Itzigsohn at La Plata Astronomical Observatory in La Plata, Argentina. It was named after Eva Perón.

== Orbit and classification ==
Based on its orbital elements, Fanatica is a S-type member of the Vesta family, which is named after 4 Vesta, the third largest body in the main-belt after the dwarf planet 1 Ceres and the minor planet 2 Pallas. Fanatica orbits the Sun at a distance of 2.2–2.6 AU once every 3 years and 9 months (1,372 days). Its orbit has an eccentricity of 0.09 and an inclination of 5° with respect to the ecliptic. It was first identified as A924 WC at Heidelberg Observatory in 1924, extending the body's observation arc by 26 years prior to its official discovery observation at La Plata.

== Physical characteristics ==
=== Rotation period ===
In November 2003, a rotational lightcurve of Fanatica was obtained by astronomer Brian Warner at his Palmer Divide Observatory in Colorado. The light-curve analysis gave a rotation period of 2.58 hours with a brightness variation of 0.16 magnitude (U=3). In August 2014, photometric observations by astronomer Robert Stephens gave a period of 2.582 hours and change in brightness of 0.18 magnitude (U=3).

=== Diameter and albedo ===
According to the surveys carried out by the Japanese Akari satellite and NASA's Wide-field Infrared Survey Explorer with its subsequent NEOWISE mission, Fanatica measures between 9.31 and 12.16 kilometers in diameter, and its surface has an albedo between 0.189 and 0.388. The Collaborative Asteroid Lightcurve Link assumes a standard albedo for stony asteroids of 0.20 and calculates a diameter of 12.39 kilometers, using an absolute magnitude of 11.9.

== Naming ==
This minor planet was named in reference to Argentine legend, Eva Perón (1919–1952), also known as "Evita", wife of Argentine President Juan Perón, First Lady of Argentina and idolized by millions. The asteroids 1569 Evita, 1581 Abanderada, 1582 Martir and 1588 Descamisada were also discovered by Itzigsohn, and were also given names in tribute to Perón. The official naming citation was published by the Minor Planet Center in April 1954 (M.P.C. 1069).
