= Miguel Itzigsohn =

Argentine astronomer (1908–1978)

Minor planets discovered: 15
| 1569 Evita | 3 August 1948 | list |
| 1571 Cesco | 20 March 1950 | list |
| 1581 Abanderada | 15 June 1950 | list |
| 1582 Martir | 15 June 1950 | list |
| 1588 Descamisada | 27 June 1951 | list |
| 1589 Fanatica | 13 September 1950 | list |
| 1596 Itzigsohn | 8 March 1951 | list |
| 1608 Muñoz | 1 September 1951 | list |
| 1684 Iguassú | 23 August 1951 | list |
| 1688 Wilkens | 3 March 1951 | list |
| 1779 Paraná | 15 June 1950 | list |
| 1800 Aguilar | 12 September 1950 | list |
| 1801 Titicaca | 23 September 1952 | list |
| 1821 Aconcagua | 24 June 1950 | list |
| 1970 Sumeria | 12 March 1954 | list |

Miguel Itzigsohn (1908–1978) was an Argentine astronomer and observer of comets, credited by the Minor Planet Center with the discovery of 15 asteroids between 1948 and 1954. The outer main-belt asteroid 1596 Itzigsohn, which he discovered himself, was named in his memory on 1 August 1980 (M.P.C. 5449).

Itzigsohn was a professor of spherical and practical astronomy. From 1955 to 1972, he was director of the extrameridian astronomy department at the La Plata Astronomical Observatory, specializing in astrometry and celestial mechanics. He was responsible for the surge in observational and computational activity in studies of minor planets in Argentina following World War II.
