= 1801 Titicaca =

Stony main-belt asteroid

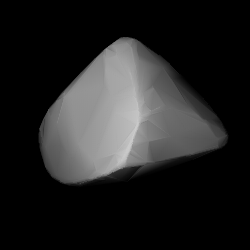
- Shape model of Titicaca from its lightcurve

Discovery
- Discovered by: M. Itzigsohn
- Discovery site: La Plata Obs.
- Discovery date: 23 September 1952

Designations
- Named after: Lake Titicaca
- Alternative designations: 1952 SP_{1} · 1963 UR
- Minor planet category: main-belt · (outer); Eos

Orbital characteristics
- Epoch 4 September 2017 (JD 2458000.5)
- Uncertainty parameter 0
- Observation arc: 64.61 yr (23,599 days)
- Aphelion: 3.2256 AU
- Perihelion: 2.8124 AU
- Semi-major axis: 3.0190 AU
- Eccentricity: 0.0684
- Orbital period (sidereal): 5.25 yr (1,916 days)
- Mean anomaly: 55.926°
- Mean motion: 0° 11^{m} 16.44^{s} / day
- Inclination: 10.972°
- Longitude of ascending node: 77.603°
- Argument of perihelion: 9.4673°

Physical characteristics
- Dimensions: 19.31±0.41 km 19.72±1.19 km 21.957±0.296; 23.08 km (derived); 23.18±2.4 km 24.772±0.106 km
- Synodic rotation period: 3.2106±0.0005 h 3.211233±0.000001 h
- Geometric albedo: 0.1098 (derived); 0.1146±0.0104; 0.1309±0.032; 0.172±0.018; 0.181±0.023
- Spectral type: S (assumed)
- Absolute magnitude (H): 11.0 · 11.10 · 11.2 · 11.32±0.22

1801 Titicaca (prov. designation: 1952 SP_{1}) is a stony Eos asteroid from the asteroid belt, approximately 22 kilometers in diameter. It was discovered on 23 September 1952, by Argentine astronomer Miguel Itzigsohn at La Plata Observatory in the capital of the province of Buenos Aires. It was named after Lake Titicaca in South America.

== Orbit and classification ==
Titicaca is a member of the Eos family (606), the largest asteroid family in the outer main belt consisting of nearly 10,000 asteroids. It orbits the Sun at a distance of 2.8–3.2 AU once every 5 years and 3 months (1,916 days). Its orbit has an eccentricity of 0.07 and an inclination of 11° with respect to the ecliptic. As no precoveries were taken, and no prior identifications were made, Titicaca's observation arc begins with its official discovery observation.

== Physical characteristics ==
Titicaca is an assumed S-type asteroid.

=== Rotation period ===
In March 2007, a rotational lightcurve of Titicaca was obtained from photometric observations taken by German amateur astronomer Axel Martin. It gave a well-defined rotation period of 3.2106 hours with a brightness variation of 0.50 in magnitude (U=3). A 2006-published lightcurve, constructed from photometry data from the Lowell photometric database, gave a concurring period of 3.211233 hours.

=== Diameter and albedo ===
According to the surveys carried out by the Infrared Astronomical Satellite IRAS, the Japanese Akari satellite, and NASA's Wide-field Infrared Survey Explorer with its subsequent NEOWISE mission, Titicaca measures between 19.31 and 24.77 kilometers in diameter and its surface has an albedo between 0.11 and 0.18. The Collaborative Asteroid Lightcurve Link derives an albedo of 0.109 and a diameter of 23.08 kilometers.

== Naming ==
This minor planet was named after Lake Titicaca in the Andes, on the border of Peru and Bolivia at an altitude of 3,812 metres (12,507 feet) above sea level, the largest lake by volume in South America and one of the largest and highest lakes in the world. Naming citation was published on 8 April 1982 (M.P.C. 6832).
