= 1800 Aguilar =

Stony main-belt asteroid

Discovery
- Discovered by: M. Itzigsohn
- Discovery site: La Plata Obs.
- Discovery date: 12 September 1950

Designations
- Named after: Félix Aguilar (astronomer)
- Alternative designations: 1950 RJ · 1952 BJ; 1972 XP_{2} · 1976 YU_{7} 1977 AE_{1}
- Minor planet category: main-belt · Vestian

Orbital characteristics
- Epoch 4 September 2017 (JD 2458000.5)
- Uncertainty parameter 0
- Observation arc: 66.54 yr (24,305 days)
- Aphelion: 2.6778 AU
- Perihelion: 2.0362 AU
- Semi-major axis: 2.3570 AU
- Eccentricity: 0.1361
- Orbital period (sidereal): 3.62 yr (1,322 days)
- Mean anomaly: 189.20°
- Mean motion: 0° 16^{m} 20.64^{s} / day
- Inclination: 5.7893°
- Longitude of ascending node: 124.24°
- Argument of perihelion: 214.46°

Physical characteristics
- Dimensions: 7.384±0.156 km 8.18 km (calculated)
- Synodic rotation period: 2.478±0.002 h (Note: Higgins (2011) web: rotation period 2.478±0.002 hours with a brightness amplitude of 0.11 mag. Summary figures at Collaborative Asteroid Lightcurve Link (CALL) for (1800) Aguilar and David Higgins Homepage)
- Geometric albedo: 0.20 (assumed); 0.295±0.047
- Spectral type: S
- Absolute magnitude (H): 12.6 · 12.8 · 13.07±0.05

1800 Aguilar, provisional designation 1950 RJ, is a stony Vestian asteroid from the inner regions of the asteroid belt, approximately 8 kilometers in diameter.

It was discovered on 12 September 1950, by Argentine astronomer Miguel Itzigsohn at La Plata Astronomical Observatory in Argentina. The asteroid was named after Argentine astronomer Félix Aguilar.

== Orbit and classification ==
The stony S-type asteroid is a member of the Vesta family. It orbits the Sun in the inner main-belt at a distance of 2.0–2.7 AU once every 3 years and 7 months (1,322 days). Its orbit has an eccentricity of 0.14 and an inclination of 6° with respect to the ecliptic. As no precoveries were taken, and no prior identifications were made, Aguilar's observation arc begins with its official discovery observation.

== Physical characteristics ==
=== Rotation period ===
In September 2008, a rotational lightcurve of Aguilar was obtained from photometric observations taken by Australian amateur astronomer David Higgins. It gave a well-defined rotation period of 2.478 hours with a brightness variation of 0.11 in magnitude (U=3).

=== Diameter and albedo ===
According to the survey carried out by NASA's Wide-field Infrared Survey Explorer with its subsequent NEOWISE mission, Aguilar measures 7.38 kilometers in diameter, and its surface has an albedo of 0.295, while the Collaborative Asteroid Lightcurve Link assumes a standard albedo for stony asteroids of 0.20 and calculates a diameter of 8.18 kilometers with an absolute magnitude of 12.8.

== Naming ==
This minor planet was named for Argentine astronomer Félix Aguilar (1884–1943), former director of the discovering observatory and founder of the University School of Astronomy and Geophysics. He contributed significantly to the development of Argentine astronomy in the first half of the 20th century (also see Félix Aguilar Observatory). The official naming citation was published by the Minor Planet Center on 20 February 1976 (M.P.C. 3934).
