= 1569 Evita =

Dark background asteroid

Discovery
- Discovered by: M. Itzigsohn
- Discovery site: La Plata Obs.
- Discovery date: 3 August 1948

Designations
- Named after: Eva Perón (First Lady of Argentina)
- Alternative designations: 1948 PA · 1936 KE; 1947 LA · 1976 SJ_{10}
- Minor planet category: main-belt · (outer) background

Orbital characteristics
- Epoch 4 September 2017 (JD 2458000.5)
- Uncertainty parameter 0
- Observation arc: 68.65 yr (25,075 days)
- Aphelion: 3.5669 AU
- Perihelion: 2.7267 AU
- Semi-major axis: 3.1468 AU
- Eccentricity: 0.1335
- Orbital period (sidereal): 5.58 yr (2,039 days)
- Mean anomaly: 95.582°
- Mean motion: 0° 10^{m} 35.76^{s} / day
- Inclination: 12.267°
- Longitude of ascending node: 99.509°
- Argument of perihelion: 249.74°

Physical characteristics
- Dimensions: 36.346±0.208 km
- Geometric albedo: 0.047±0.007
- Absolute magnitude (H): 11.2

1569 Evita (provisional designation 1948 PA) is a dark background asteroid from the outer regions of the asteroid belt, approximately 36 kilometers in diameter. It was discovered on 3 August 1948, by astronomer Miguel Itzigsohn at the La Plata Astronomical Observatory in Argentina. The asteroid was named after Eva Perón.

== Orbit and classification ==
Based on the hierarchical clustering method, Evita is a non-family asteroid of the main belt's background population. It orbits the Sun in the outer main-belt at a distance of 2.7–3.6 AU once every 5 years and 7 months (2,039 days). Its orbit has an eccentricity of 0.13 and an inclination of 12° with respect to the ecliptic.

The asteroid was first identified as 1936 KE at the Johannesburg Observatory in May 1936. The body's observation arc begins with its official discovery observation at La Plata.

== Physical characteristics ==
=== Diameter and albedo ===
According to the survey carried out by the NEOWISE mission of NASA's Wide-field Infrared Survey Explorer, Evita measures 36.346 kilometers in diameter and its surface has an albedo of 0.047. An albedo near 0.05 is typical for carbonaceous C-type asteroids which dominate the outer asteroid belt. It has an absolute magnitude of 11.2.

=== Rotation period ===
As of 2017, no rotational lightcurve of Evita has been obtained from photometric observations. The asteroid's rotation period and axis, as well as its shape remain unknown.

== Naming ==
This minor planet was named after the First Lady of Argentina, Eva Perón (1919–1952), who was commonly known by the affectionate Spanish diminutive form of her name, Evita. She was the wife of President Juan Perón (1895–1974) of Argentina.

The discoverer also named the asteroids 1581 Abanderada, 1582 Martir, 1588 Descamisada and 1589 Fanatica in tribute to Eva Perón. The official naming citation was published by the Minor Planet Center in February 1951 (M.P.C. 519).
