= 1608 Muñoz =

Flora asteroid from the inner regions of the asteroid belt

Discovery
- Discovered by: M. Itzigsohn
- Discovery site: La Plata Obs.
- Discovery date: 1 September 1951

Designations
- Named after: F. A. Muñoz (Argentine astronomer)
- Alternative designations: 1951 RZ · 1951 RK_{1} 1961 UD · 1974 HH_{1}
- Minor planet category: main-belt · (inner); Flora

Orbital characteristics
- Epoch 27 April 2019 (JD 2458600.5)
- Uncertainty parameter 0
- Observation arc: 69.29 yr (25,309 d)
- Aphelion: 2.5892 AU
- Perihelion: 1.8381 AU
- Semi-major axis: 2.2137 AU
- Eccentricity: 0.1697
- Orbital period (sidereal): 3.29 yr (1,203 d)
- Mean anomaly: 212.24°
- Mean motion: 0° 17^{m} 57.48^{s} / day
- Inclination: 3.9436°
- Longitude of ascending node: 356.96°
- Argument of perihelion: 316.47°

Physical characteristics
- Mean diameter: 6.15±0.47 km 6.529±0.583 km 6.711±0.571 km
- Synodic rotation period: 5.3456±0.0007 h (Note: Pravec (2017) web: lightcurve plot of (1608) Muñoz, rotation period 5.3456±0.0007 hours with a brightness amplitude of 0.36 mag. Quality code is 3. Summary figures at the LCDB and Ondrejov NEO Photometric Program and collaborating projects.)
- Geometric albedo: 0.2654; 0.323; 0.403
- Spectral type: S (assumed)
- Absolute magnitude (H): 12.60; 12.7; 12.90

1608 Muñoz, provisional designation 1951 RZ, is a Flora asteroid from the inner regions of the asteroid belt, approximately 6.5 kilometers (4 miles) in diameter. It was discovered on 1 September 1951, by Argentine astronomer Miguel Itzigsohn at the La Plata Astronomical Observatory, in La Plata, Argentina. The S-type asteroid has a rotation period of 5.3 hours. It was named after F. A. Muñoz, one of the assistant astronomers at the discovering observatory.

== Orbit and classification ==
Muñoz is a member of the Flora family (402), a giant asteroid clan and the largest family of stony asteroids in the main-belt. It orbits the Sun in the inner asteroid belt at a distance of 1.8–2.6 AU once every 3 years and 3 months (1,203 days; semi-major axis of 2.21 AU). Its orbit has an eccentricity of 0.17 and an inclination of 4° with respect to the ecliptic. It was first imaged on a precovery taken at the Lowell Observatory in November 1948, extending the body's observation arc by 3 years prior to its official discovery observation.

== Naming ==
This minor planet was named in memory of F. A. Muñoz, who was an assistant at the La Plata Observatory in the department of extra-meridian astronomy. Muñoz was involved in computational and observational work on minor planets for many years and also took an active part in site testing for the Argentine telescope, also known as the 85-inch or 2.15-meter Jorge Sahade Telescope (also see Leoncito Astronomical Complex § Telescopes). The official naming citation was published by the Minor Planet Center on 1 August 1980 (M.P.C. 5449).

== Physical characteristics ==
Being a Florian asteroid, Muñoz is likely a stony, relatively bright S-type asteroid.

=== Rotation period ===
Muñoz is a target of the Photometric Survey for Asynchronous Binary Asteroids (BinAstPhot Survey) led by astronomer Petr Pravec at the Ondřejov Observatory in the Czech Republic. In September 2017, two rotational lightcurves were obtained from photometric observations by Pravec in collaboration with Serbian astronomer Vladimir Benishek at Belgrade Observatory, who observed the asteroid over three subsequent nights at Sopot Astronomical Observatory (K90). Analysis of the bimodal lightcurve gave a well-defined, nearly identical rotation period of 5.3451±0.0008 and 5.3456±0.0007 hours, respectively, with a brightness amplitude of 0.36 magnitude (U=3).

=== Diameter and albedo ===
According to the surveys carried out by the Japanese Akari satellite and the NEOWISE mission of NASA's Wide-field Infrared Survey Explorer, Muñoz measures between 6.15 and 7.8 kilometers in diameter and its surface has an albedo between 0.265 and 0.40. The Collaborative Asteroid Lightcurve Link assumes an albedo of 0.24 – derived from 8 Flora, the principal body of the Flora family – and calculates a diameter of 7.82 kilometers based on an absolute magnitude of 12.7.
