= Johannes Franz Hartmann =

German physicist and astronomer

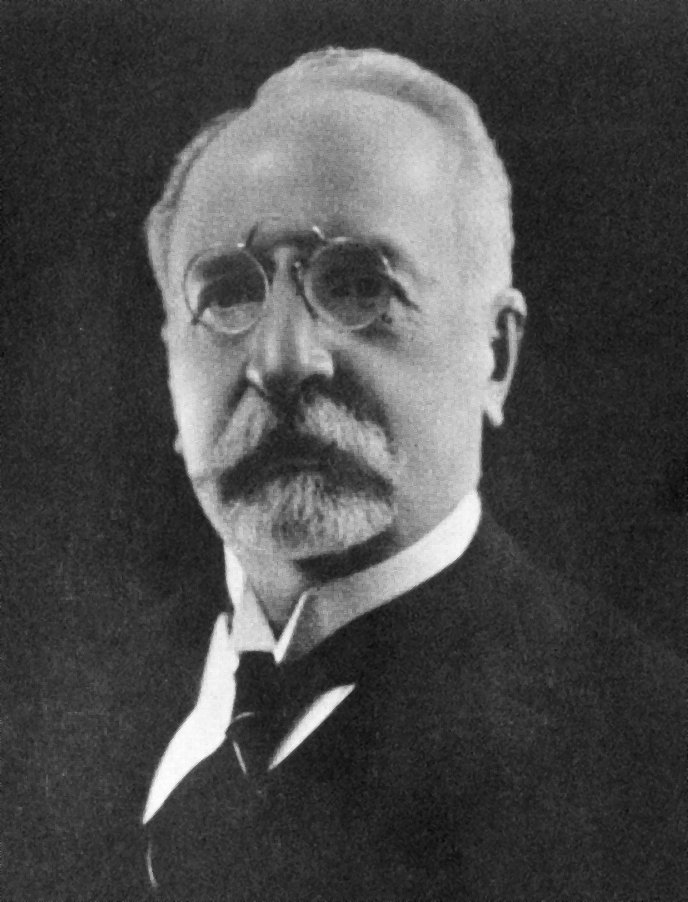
- Born: 11 January 1865; Erfurt, Saxony
- Died: 13 September 1936 (aged 71); Göttingen
- Citizenship: German
- Education: University of Leipzig
- Known for: Discovering interstellar medium
- Scientific career
- Fields: Astronomy
- Workplaces: Astrophysical Observatory Potsdam
- Doctoral advisor: Heinrich Bruns

Minor planets discovered: 3
965 Angelica	4 November 1921	MPC
1029 La Plata	28 April 1924	MPC
1254 Erfordia	10 May 1932	MPC

Johannes Franz Hartmann (11 January 1865 – 13 September 1936) was a German physicist and astronomer. In 1904, while studying the spectroscopy of Delta Orionis he noticed that most of the spectrum had a shift, except the calcium lines, which he interpreted as indicating the presence of interstellar medium.

He was the director of the La Plata Astronomical Observatory, Argentina, from November 1922 to May 1934, and was also known under the name Juan Hartmann. He oriented the work of the observatory towards astrophysics and discovered the three asteroids of the main-belt, 965 Angelica, 1029 La Plata and 1254 Erfordia at La Plata between 1921 and 1932.

His doctorate was from the University of Leipzig in 1891 on lunar eclipses.

The lunar crater Hartmann on the far side of the Moon was named in his honor. Note, however, that the asteroid 3341 Hartmann was named after William K. Hartmann and is unrelated to him.

Hartmann at the 1910 Fourth Conference International Union for Cooperation in Solar Research at Mount Wilson Observatory

== See also ==
- Hartmann mask, a tool to help focusing telescope
