= Federico Kurtz =

German-Argentine botanist (1854–1920)

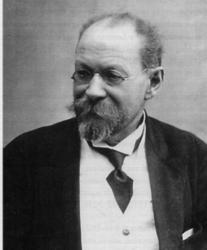
- Born: 1854; Berlin, Germany
- Died: 1920 (Aged 66); Córdoba, Argentina

Federico Kurtz, also known as Fritz (1854–1920), was a German-Argentine botanist.

== Biography ==
Fritz Kurtz was born in Berlin and earned his doctorate from the University of Berlin in 1879. He relocated to Córdoba, Argentina, and in 1884, took over the chair of botany at the National University of Córdoba. Building on the performance studies and research begun under his predecessor, Dr. Paul Lorentz, Kurtz expanded the school's collections and published key works in the study of botany and paleobotany in Argentina.

He directed the university's Museum of Botany. He was an active member of the National Academy of Sciences of Córdoba, initiating the exchange of research and material with similar institutions from around the world. His tenure at the Department of Botany influenced numerous younger Argentine naturalists, notably Eduardo Ladislao Holmberg and Juan Domíguez.

Kurtz retired from his post in 1915, and died in Córdoba in 1921. His private herbarium and library were acquired by the National University of Córdoba and were incorporated into the Museum of Botany.

The Kurtz nomenclature is used for the citation of the numerous species he classified in his career.
