= Asociación Argentina Amigos de la Astronomía =

Argentine amateur astronomy civil association

Asociación Argentina "Amigos de la Astronomía" (AAAA)
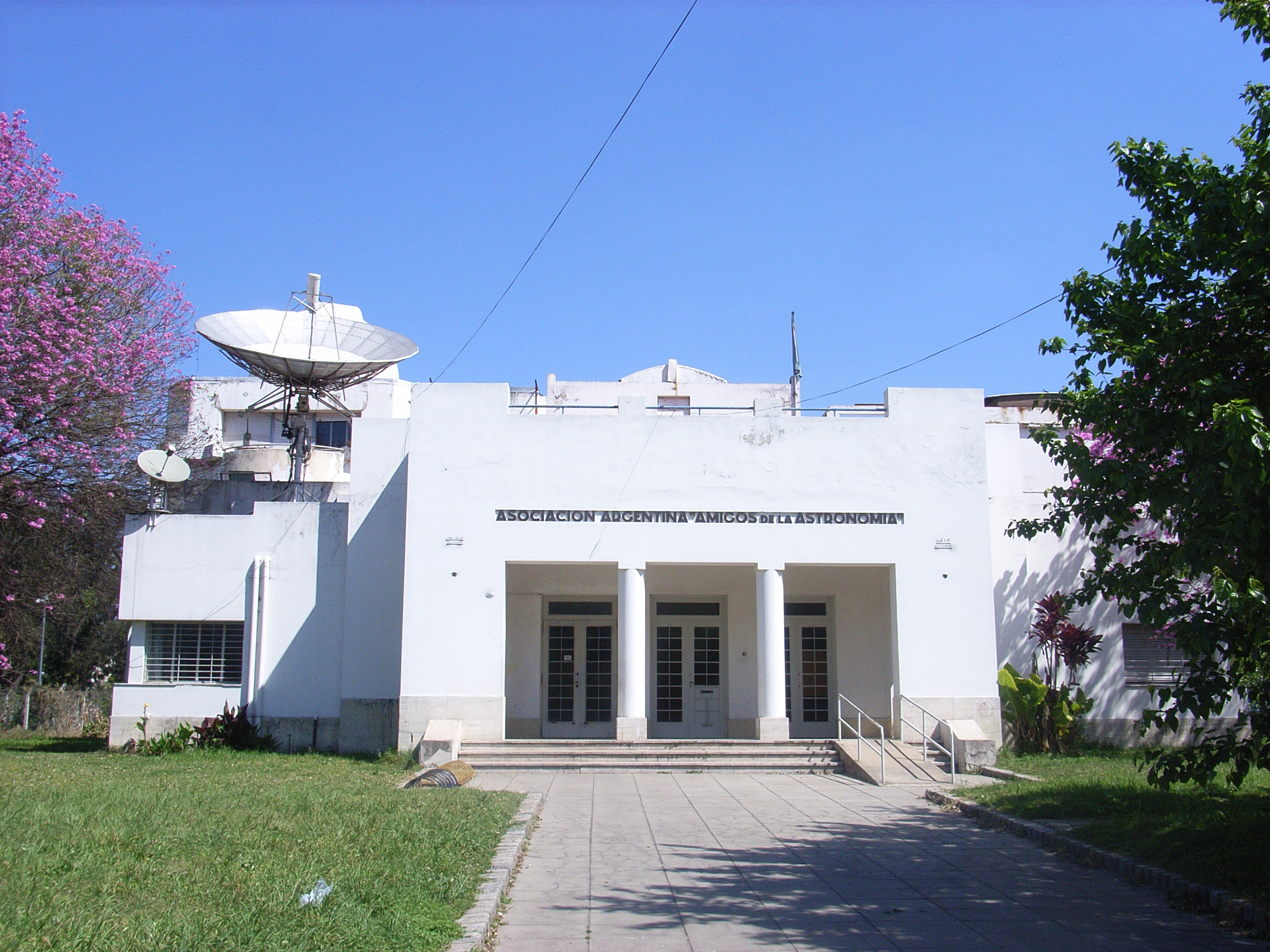
- Front of the building.
- Alternative names: Asociación Argentina Amigos de la Astronomía
- Organization: Asociación Argentina "Amigos de la Astronomía"
- Observatory code: 834
- Location: Caballito, Ciudad de Buenos Aires, Argentina
- Coordinates: 34°36′17.4″S 58°26′6″W
- Established: January 4, 1929
- Website: amigosdelaastronomia.org

Telescopes
- Gautier: Refracting telescope, 220 mm optical aperture y 3.300 mm Focal length.
- Devoto: Refracting telescope, 130 mm optical aperture y 2.300 mm Focal length.
- Related media on Commons

Asociación Argentina Amigos de la Astronomía (AAAA, A.A.A.A. or asaramas; the Argentine Association of the Friends of Astronomy; observatory code 834) is an amateur astronomy civil association based in Buenos Aires, Argentina, with the aim of spreading astronomy. It was founded on January 4, 1929, and its field courses are held on related subjects, research in collaboration with professional bodies and printed publications or multimedia, and recreational activities for the general public. The main-belt asteroid 4756 Asaramas was named in honor of the observatory.

== Instrumental and equipment ==
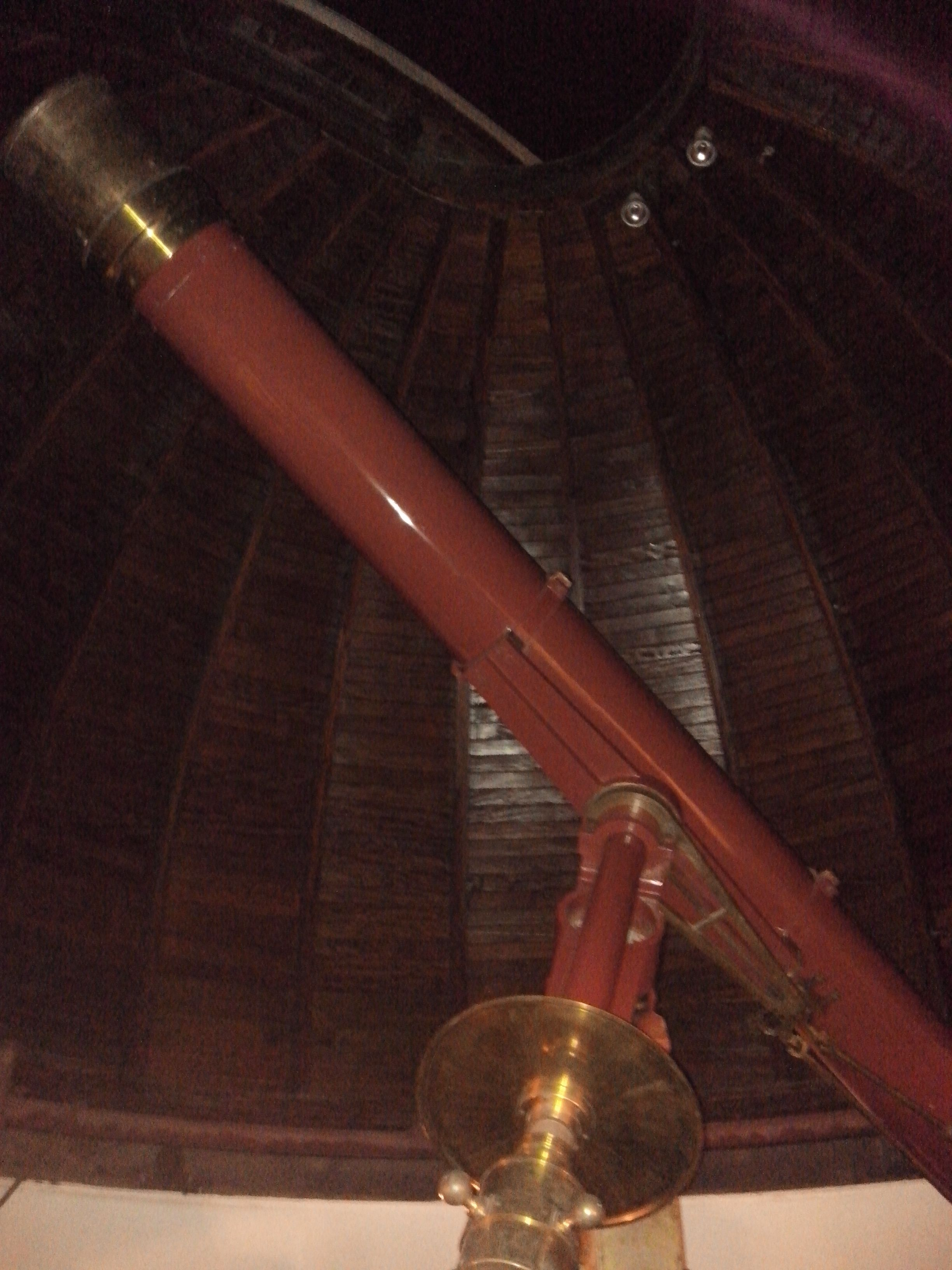
Gautier telescope in the A.A.A.A.

The equipment of the entity is available to both partners and research groups. It includes several Reflecting and Refractor Telescopes of various types and sizes, a small astrograph, optical tools and machinery for the construction and optical polishing of telescopes.

=== Gautier telescope ===
The Gautier telescope is an old refractor telescope with 220 mm of diameter and 3.300 mm of focal length. It was built by the French company Gautier House, on behalf of the Paris Observatory and transferred to Argentina in 1882 on the occasion of the extraordinary event of the transit of Venus of December 6, 1882.

== Awards and distinctions ==
On April 21, 1950, astronomers of the La Plata Astronomical Observatory discovered an asteroid that they baptized 4756 Asaramas – Asociación Argentina Amigos de la Astronomía –, for having provided this institution the first contact of numerous professional astronomers of the platense observatory with astronomical science. The name was later homologated by the International Astronomical Union on 1 September 1993 (M.P.C. 22503).

== See also ==
- List of astronomical observatories
- List of astronomical societies
