= 1029 La Plata =

Main-belt asteroid

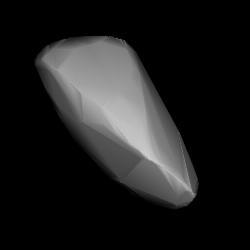
- Shape model of La Plata from its lightcurve

Discovery
- Discovered by: J. F. Hartmann
- Discovery site: La Plata Obs.
- Discovery date: 28 April 1924

Designations
- Named after: La Plata (city in Argentina and discovering observatory)
- Alternative designations: 1924 RK · 1938 DR_{2} 1969 OU · A916 UL; A916 UR
- Minor planet category: main-belt · (outer); Koronis

Orbital characteristics
- Epoch 23 March 2018 (JD 2458200.5)
- Uncertainty parameter 0
- Observation arc: 100.68 yr (36,772 d)
- Aphelion: 2.9715 AU
- Perihelion: 2.8083 AU
- Semi-major axis: 2.8899 AU
- Eccentricity: 0.0282
- Orbital period (sidereal): 4.91 yr (1,794 d)
- Mean anomaly: 87.729°
- Mean motion: 0° 12^{m} 2.16^{s} / day
- Inclination: 2.4254°
- Longitude of ascending node: 29.903°
- Argument of perihelion: 142.56°

Physical characteristics
- Mean diameter: 16.46±1.07 km 19.32±2.72 km 20.71 km (derived); 20.78±1.9 km
- Synodic rotation period: 14 h 14.174±0.003 h 15.310±0.003 h 15.37 h
- Geometric albedo: 0.1655 (derived); 0.1819±0.039; 0.229±0.246; 0.310±0.045
- Spectral type: Tholen = S · S B–V = 0.787; U–B = 0.390
- Absolute magnitude (H): 10.79 · 10.88; 10.99; 11.01±0.01; 11.37±0.60

1029 La Plata, provisional designation 1924 RK, is a stony Koronis asteroid from the outer regions of the asteroid belt, approximately 20 kilometers (12 miles) in diameter. It was discovered on 28 April 1924, by German astronomer Johannes Hartmann at the La Plata Astronomical Observatory in Argentina. It was named after the city of La Plata, Argentina, where the discovering observatory is located. The possibly elongated S-type asteroid has a rotation period of 15.31 hours.

== Orbit and classification ==
La Plata is a member of the Koronis family (605), a prominent asteroid family with nearly co-planar ecliptical orbits and one of the largest families in the main belt at all. It orbits the Sun in the outer asteroid belt at a distance of 2.8–3.0 AU once every 4 years and 11 months (1,794 days; semi-major axis of 2.89 AU), which is near the 5:2 resonance with Jupiter (2.82 AU). Its orbit has an eccentricity of 0.03 and an inclination of 2° with respect to the ecliptic.

The asteroid was first observed as A916 UL and A916 UR at the observatories at Simeiz and Algiers in October 1916, respectively. Its observation arc begins with the latter observation at Algiers on 31 October 1916, more than 7 years prior its official discovery observation at La Plata.

== Physical characteristics ==
In the Tholen classification, La Plata is a common, stony S-type asteroid, which agrees with the overall spectral type for Koronian asteroids. The photometric survey conducted by Pan-STARRS also characterized it as an S-type.

=== Rotation period ===
In October 2004, a rotational lightcurve of La Plata was obtained from photometric observations during an extensive survey of Koronian asteroids at seven different observatories in the United States. Lightcurve analysis gave a well-defined rotation period of 15.310 hours with a brightness variation of 0.58 magnitude (U=3). Previous measurements from 1975 and 1983 showed a period of 14 and 15.37 hours, respectively (U=2/2). Also in October 2004, an alternative period of 14.174 hours was obtained by French amateur astronomer Laurent Bernasconi (U=2). The consolidated brightness amplitude of 0.26 to 0.58 magnitude indicates that the body's shape is somewhat elongated.

=== Diameter and albedo ===
According to the surveys carried out by the Infrared Astronomical Satellite IRAS, the Japanese Akari satellite and the NEOWISE mission of NASA's Wide-field Infrared Survey Explorer, La Plata measures between 16.46 and 20.78 kilometers in diameter and its surface has an albedo between 0.1819 and 0.310. The Collaborative Asteroid Lightcurve Link derives an albedo of 0.1655 and a diameter of 20.71 kilometers based on an absolute magnitude of 10.99.

== Naming ==
This minor planet was named after the city of La Plata, Argentina, where the discovering La Plata Astronomical Observatory is located. The official naming citation was mentioned in The Names of the Minor Planets by Paul Herget in 1955 (H 98).
