= Carlos Segers =

Argentine astronomer (1900–1967)

- Born: 1900; Chile
- Died: 1967 (aged 66–67); Argentina
- Known for: Founder of Asociación Argentina Amigos de la Astronomía, promoted the creation of the Galileo Galilei planetarium.
- Awards: A crater on the Moon is named after him.
- Scientific career
- Fields: Astronomy
- Workplaces: Asociación Argentina Amigos de la Astronomía; Galileo Galilei planetarium

Carlos Segers (1900–1967) was an Argentine astronomer.

He was an observer of variable stars, and organized amateur astronomers in South America. He founded the 'Argentine Friends of Astronomy Association'.

The crater Segers on the Moon is named after him.

== See also ==
- Asociación Argentina Amigos de la Astronomía
