= Natty Hollmann =

Argentine philanthropist (1939–2021)

Natty Hollmann (1939 – 26 July 2021), also known by her married name Natty Petrosino, was an Argentine philanthropist and humanitarian known for her advocacy and work for the indigent.

== Early life ==
Hollmann was born in July 1939, in Bahía Blanca, Argentina, to Volga German parents. She became a successful fashion model in the 1960s, and acted in a number of minor roles in Argentine cinema and television, where one of her closest friends was Susana Giménez (later a ratings leader on Argentine television). She studied at the University of Buenos Aires, enrolling at the schools of Medicine and Sociology, and obtaining a degree in the latter discipline, following which she met a prominent local businessman. She became Natty Petrosino and settled into married life, having two children and living as a well-to-do housewife.

At the age of 28, however, an operation resulted in her being declared clinically dead, leading to a mystical experience from which she awakened, resolved to devote herself to the poor, leaving her upscale life and donating her estate to assist the indigent. She became interested, in particular, in the area's marginalized native peoples.

== Work as a humanitarian ==
Argentina, a country with a white majority and with a strong European influence, is also home to numerous communities of Aborigines who, for the most part, live in very poor conditions. She began her humanitarian labour among them, providing shelter and nutritional, medical, educational and other assistance with her own funds and through donations, living in a small recreational vehicle received as a gift.

She established the Saint Francis of Assisi Home for Pilgrims in 1978, extending the reach of her efforts to the mentally handicapped and homeless AIDS victims, and growing to serve an average of 7,000 hot meals daily. An encounter with the Argentine Ambassador in Russia also led to a stay in that country during the early 1990s, helping build housing during the turmoil that followed the collapse of the Soviet Union. She left the daily operation of the home to the local archdiocese in the mid 1990s, becoming an itinerant charity worker. Her travels took her to impoverished communities of Mapuches in Patagonia and Mendoza Province, Wichís in Chaco Province, and to Tucumán and Formosa Provinces (among the country's poorest), where she spent a decade. Followed by her mobile clinic, she and her assistants combated trypanosomiasis and completed numerous clinics, schools, wells, and homes, establishing a number of villages outright.

Petrosino became known also for her animal rights advocacy, keeping scores of abandoned dogs and cats.

Her itinerant efforts nearly cost Petrosino her life. She was hospitalized for a life-threatening fever on at least one occasion, and during her travels, her Toyota pickup turned over in an accident. She and her companions survived, though hospitalization forced Petrosino to suspend her activities for the first time since their outset in 1978. Ultimately, she recovered, and her vehicle was replaced by a donation.

Petrosino was elected "International Woman of the Year" by the Autonomous Region of Valle d'Aosta, Italy, in 2006, and was named an Illustrious Citizen of Bahía Blanca on 14 December of that year.

Natty Hollmann Petrosino was nominated for the Nobel Peace Prize on 2 March 2009.

== Death ==
Hollmann died from COVID-19 in Bahía Blanca, on 26 July 2021, during the COVID-19 pandemic in Argentina.
