= Segers (crater) =

Crater on the Moon

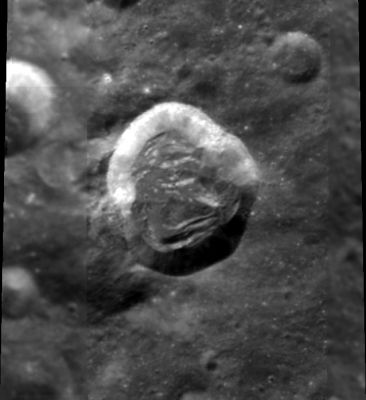
- Segers crater
- Coordinates: 47.1°N 127.7°E
- Diameter: 17 km
- Depth: Unknown
- Colongitude: 233° at sunrise
- Eponym: Carlos Segers

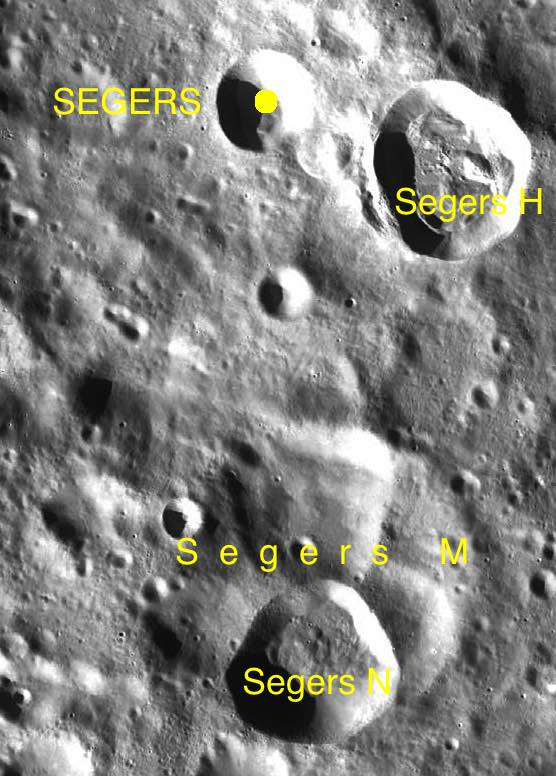
Satellite features of Segers

Segers is a small lunar impact crater that is located on the Moon's far side. It lies about one crater diameter to the east of the much larger crater Millikan. To the north of Segers is von Békésy.

Segers is unusual in that all of its satellite craters have a larger diameter. It is roughly circular in outline, with a bowl-shaped interior. The rim is not significantly worn due to impact erosion, and the edge remains sharp. The inner wall has a relatively high albedo, giving the crater a bright appearance.

== Satellite craters ==
By convention these features are identified on lunar maps by placing the letter on the side of the crater midpoint that is closest to Segers.

Segers	Latitude	Longitude	Diameter
H	46.7° N	129.0° E	29 km
M	44.5° N	127.6° E	54 km
N	44.0° N	127.5° E	27 km
