= 404 Arsinoë =

Main-belt asteroid

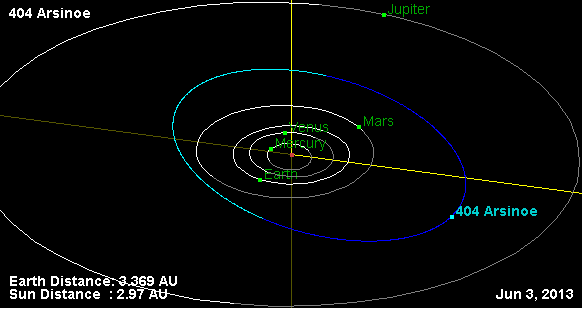
- Orbital diagram

Discovery
- Discovered by: Auguste Charlois
- Discovery date: 20 June 1895

Designations
- Pronunciation: /ɑːrˈsɪnoʊ.iː/
- Named after: Arsinoe
- Alternative designations: 1895 BY
- Minor planet category: Main belt
- Adjectives: Arsinoean /ˌɑːrsɪnoʊˈiːən/

Orbital characteristics
- Epoch 31 July 2016 (JD 2457600.5)
- Uncertainty parameter 0
- Observation arc: 116.88 yr (42691 d)
- Aphelion: 3.10936 AU (465.154 Gm)
- Perihelion: 2.07791 AU (310.851 Gm)
- Semi-major axis: 2.59364 AU (388.003 Gm)
- Eccentricity: 0.19884
- Orbital period (sidereal): 4.18 yr (1525.7 d)
- Mean anomaly: 41.5847°
- Mean motion: 0° 14^{m} 9.46^{s} / day
- Inclination: 14.1044°
- Longitude of ascending node: 92.6126°
- Argument of perihelion: 120.382°

Physical characteristics
- Mean diameter: 95.78±3.10 km (composite estimate); 97.71±1.5 km
- Mass: (8.21 ± 1.70) × 10^{17} kg (composite estimate)
- Mean density: 1.78±0.41 g/cm^{3}
- Synodic rotation period: 8.887 h (0.3703 d)
- Geometric albedo: 0.0461±0.001
- Spectral type: C
- Absolute magnitude (H): 9.01, 9.11

404 Arsinoë (from Greek Ἀρσινόη Arsĭnŏē) is a large main-belt asteroid. It is classified as a C-type asteroid and is probably composed of carbonaceous material.

It was discovered by Auguste Charlois on June 20, 1895, in Nice.
