= Alfred Wilhelm Stelzner =

German geologist

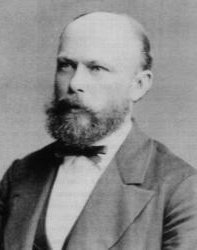
Alfred Wilhelm Stelzner

Alfred Wilhelm Stelzner (20 December 1840, Dresden – 25 February 1895, Wiesbaden) was a German geologist.

From 1859 to 1864 he was a student at the Bergakademie Freiberg, an institute where he later served as inspector. From 1871 to 1874 he was a professor of mineralogy and geology at the University of Córdoba in Argentina. In 1874 he returned to the Bergakademie at Freiberg, where he succeeded his former teacher, Bernhard von Cotta. Here, he taught classes until his death in 1895.

He was the first geologist to describe the minerals famatinite (1873) and franckeite (1893). The mineral alfredstelznerite is named in his honor.

== Selected writings ==
- Die Granite von Geyer und Ehrenfirdersdorf sowie die Zinnerzlagerstätten von Geyer, 1865 - The granite of Geyer and Ehrenfriedersdorf, and the tin ore deposits of Geyer.
- Atlas der Mineralogie, 1875 - Atlas of mineralogy.
- Beiträge zur Geologie und Palaeontologie der Argentinischen Republik, 1876 - Contributions to geology and paleontology in the Republic of Argentina.
- Die silber-zinnerzlagerstätten Bolivias : ein beitrag zur naturgeschichte des zinnerzes, 1897 - Silver-tin ore deposits of Bolivia; a contribution to the natural history of tin ore.
- Die Erzlagerstätten, 1904 - Ore deposits.
