= Paul Günther Lorentz =

German botanist (1835–1881)

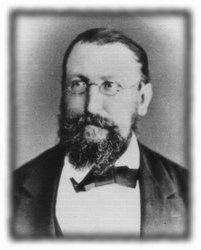
Paul Günther Lorentz (1835–1881)

Paul (Pablo) Günther Lorentz (30 August 1835 – 6 October 1881) was a German-Argentine botanist.

Lorentz was born in Kahla, Thuringia. He initially studied theology at the University of Jena and the University of Erlangen. From 1858, he studied botany at the Ludwig-Maximilians-Universität München, where he was a pupil of Carl Wilhelm von Nägeli. He focused his attention towards the study of mosses, subsequently collecting specimens throughout Europe (the Black Forest, the Austrian Alps, Switzerland, northern Italy and Scandinavia). With Wilhelm Philippe Schimper, he collaborated on Geographie der Moose. In 1868, Lorentz collected and distributed exsiccata specimens under the title Unio itineraria cryptogamica.

In 1870, he immigrated to Argentina, where he was appointed professor of botany at the National University of Córdoba. In 1871–72, he explored the mountainous regions of Tucumán and Catamarca provinces with geologist Alfred Wilhelm Stelzner (1840–1895). Bryological specimens found on the expedition were kept for personal study by Lorentz, while vascular plants that he collected were sent to August Grisebach for further analysis, who described the vascular specimens in the treatise "Plantae Lorentzianae" (1874).

With his assistant, Georg Hieronymous, he conducted botanical investigations through the northern provinces of Jujuy and Salta, and into the lowlands of the Gran Chaco and Bolivia. Collections from this expedition were described by Grisebach (along with Lorentz's later collections from Entre Rios Province) in the treatise "Symbolae ad Floram Argentinam" (1879). His collection of lichens from the expedition were shipped to August von Krempelhuber and his Hepaticae specimens were sent to bryologist Karl Müller.

In 1874, due to political events, he relocated to Concepción del Uruguay as an instructor of natural history. In 1879, with Gustavo Niederlein (1858–1924), he participated in a scientific expedition across the Pampas to the Rio Negro. Lorentz died in Concepción del Uruguay at the age of 46 on 6 October 1881, a victim of liver disease.

As a result of his Argentine excursions, he collected many species of flowering plants, mosses and lichens that were new to science. Also, he is credited with providing the first phytogeographical map of Argentina.

== Selected works ==
- Beiträge zur Biologie und Geographie der Laubmoose, 1860
- Moosstudien, 1864
- Bryologisches Notizbuch. : Zum praktischen Gebrauche, 1865
- Reiseskizzen aus Argentinien, 1875
- La vegetación del nordeste de la provincia de Entre Ríos, informe científico, 1878.

He was honoured in 2007, when botanists R.M. King & H. Rob. published Lorentzianthus, which is a monotypic genus of South American flowering plants in the boneset tribe within the sunflower family.
