= La Plata Astronomical Observatory =

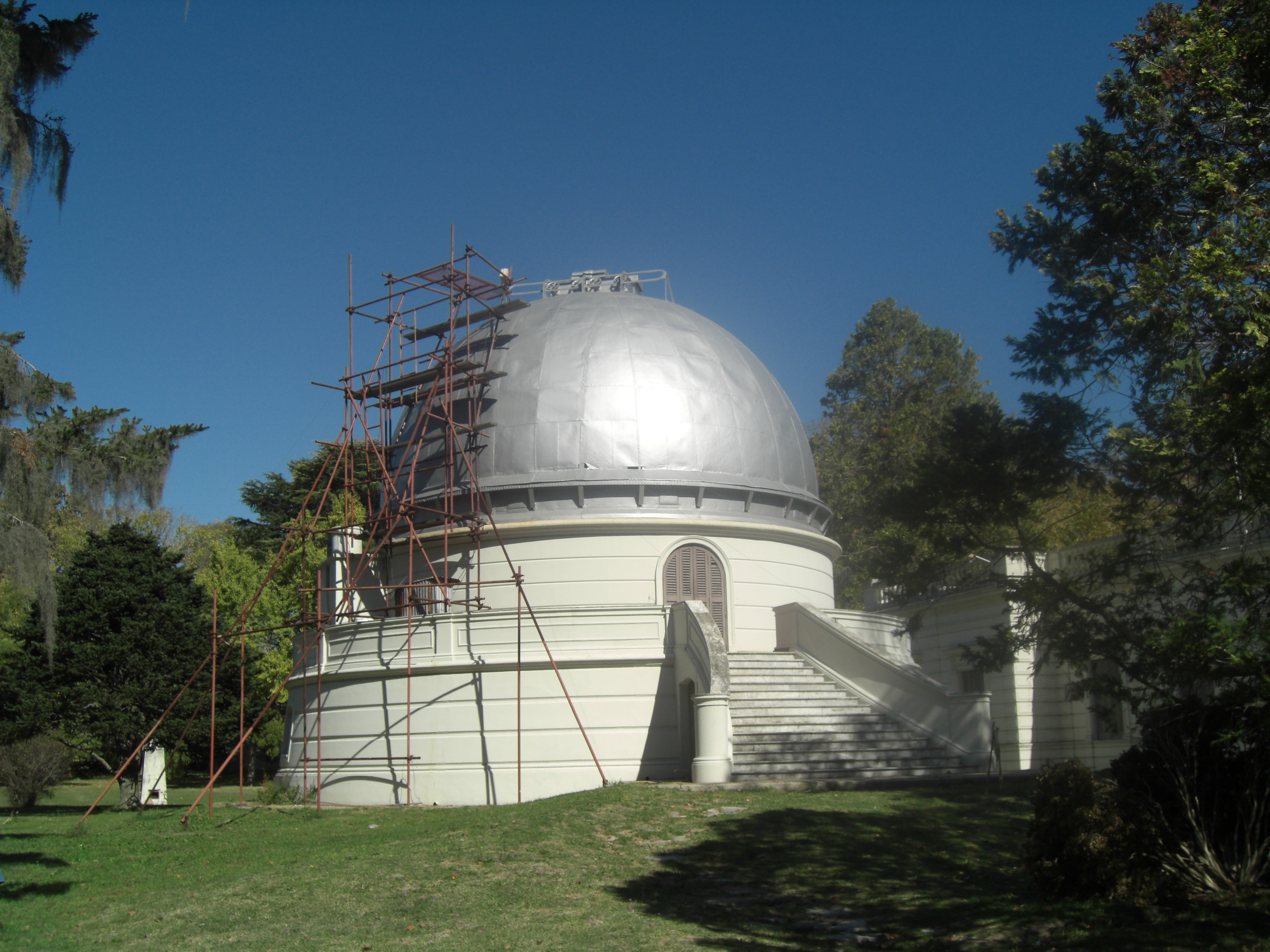

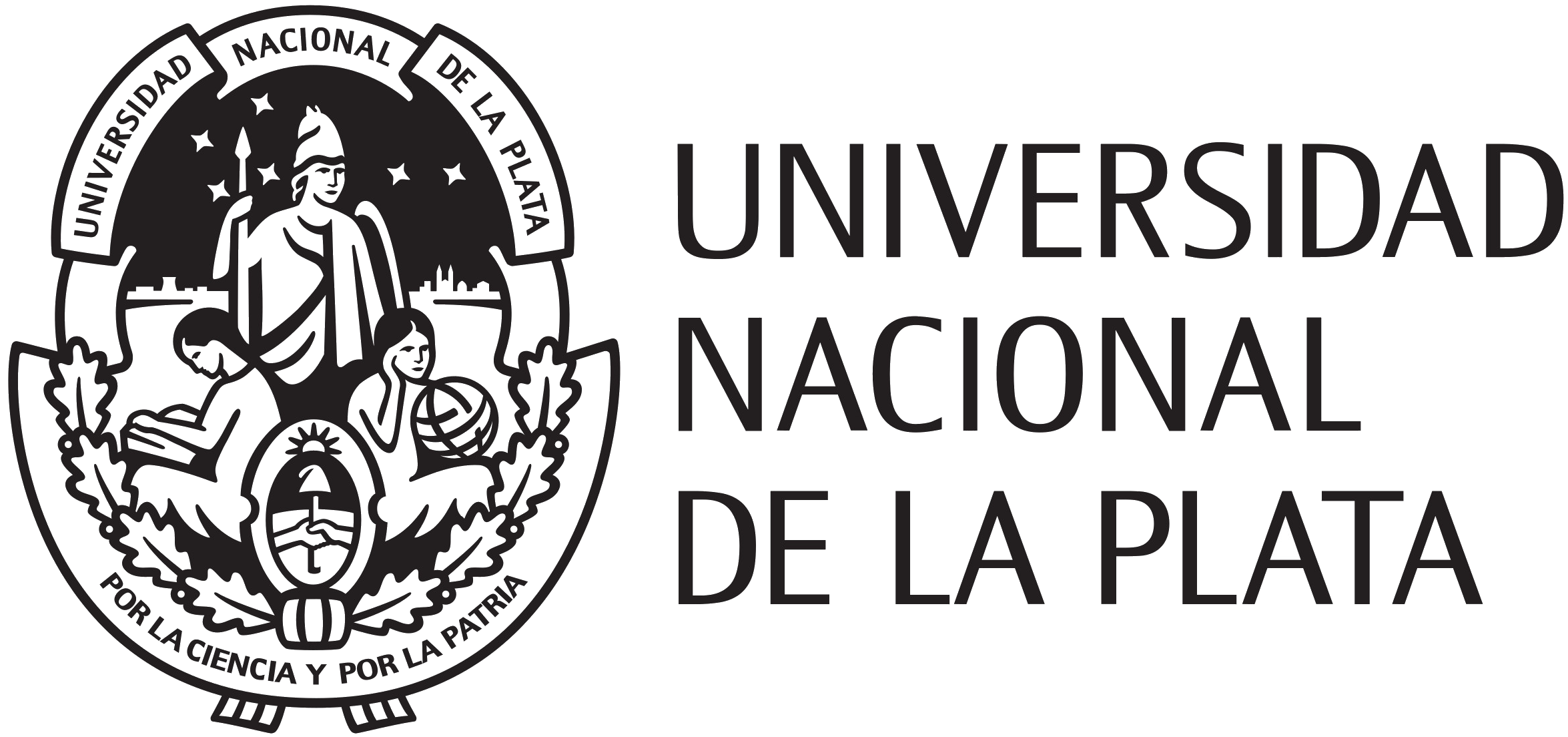
- Alternative names: Observatorio Astronomico La Plata
- Observatory code: 839
- Location: La Plata, Argentina
- Coordinates: 34°54′30″S 57°55′58″W
- Altitude: 16 m (52 ft)
- Established: 1883; 143 years ago
- Website: turismolaplata/observatorio
- Architect: Pedro Benoit
- Related media on Commons

The La Plata Astronomical Observatory (Spanish: Observatorio Astronómico de La Plata) is an observatory located in the city of La Plata, capital of the province of Buenos Aires, Argentina. Its IAU code is 839.

== History ==
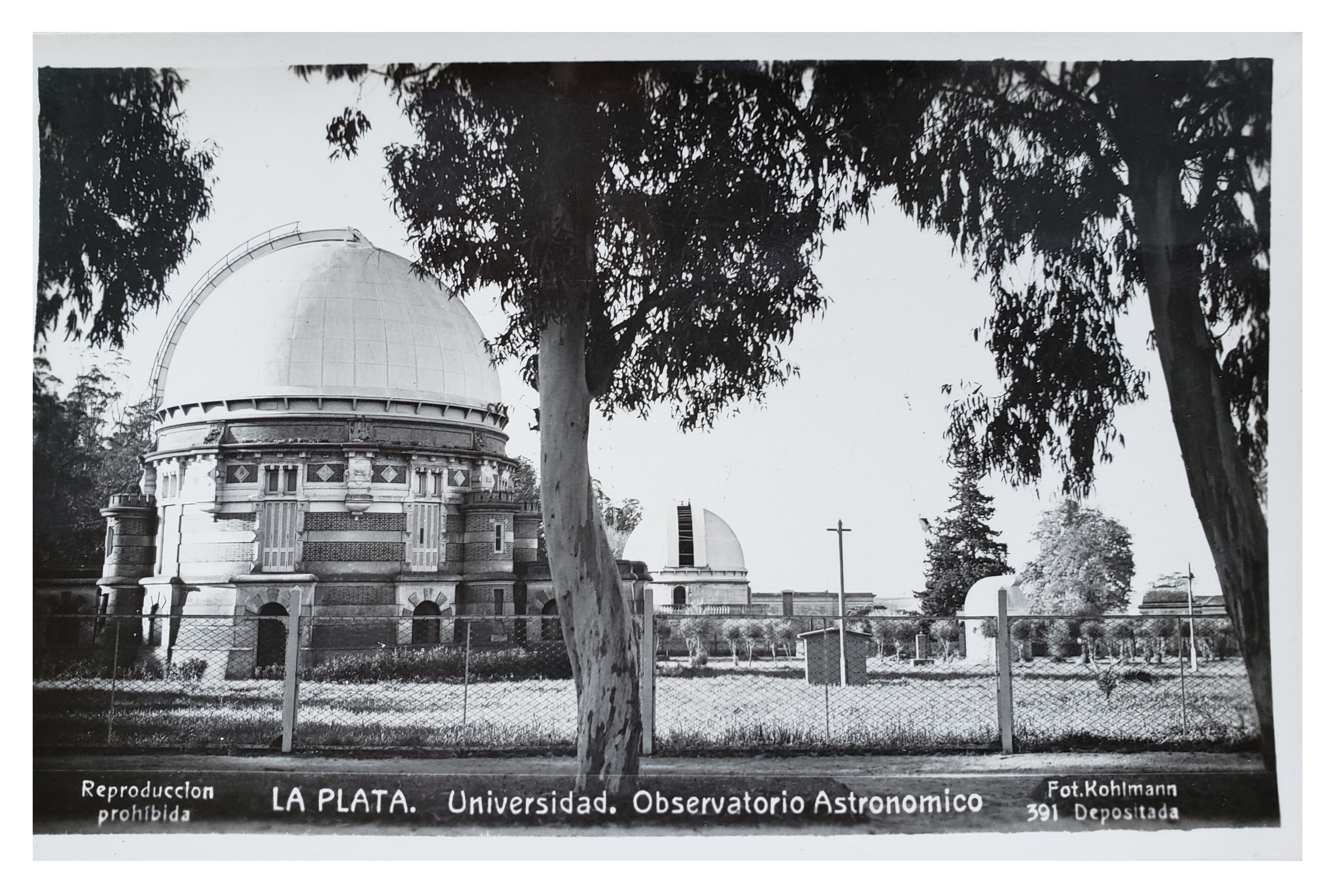
The observatory in the 1920s

La Plata was a planned city, intended as the capital of the province after the city of Buenos Aires became the Argentina's Federal Capital. The observatory was the result of the 1872 establishment of the National Meteorological Bureau, enacted by President Domingo Sarmiento on an initiative by U.S. astronomer Benjamin Apthorp Gould (who lived in Argentina between 1870 and 1885). The construction of the Observatory was funded by a decree passed by La Plata's founder, Buenos Aires Province Governor Dardo Rocha, on 7 May 1881. In this decree the Engineering Department was ordered to set up plans and a budget for several public buildings, including an astronomical observatory.

Designed by the master planner of La Plata, Pedro Benoit, ground was broken on the observatory in November 1883. A year earlier, the Paris Observatory had sent astronomical instruments to the city of Bragado, Buenos Aires, to observe a transit of Venus in front of the Sun, for which the location was particularly suitable, and which raised considerable interest in scientific circles.

The first director of the new institution was Francisco Beuf, a lieutenant of the French Army and director of the Naval Observatory of Toulon.

== See also ==
- List of astronomical observatories
- Lists of telescopes
