= List of named minor planets: G =

This is a partial list of named minor planets, containing all those starting with the letter G, as of 9 November 2026. It is ordered in a case-insensitive, alphabetical manner and contains a total of 1,081 entries. Grey minor planets have no article and redirect to the list of minor planets instead (see List of minor planets § Main index).

== G ==
- 229762 Gǃkúnǁʼhòmdímà
- 28622 Gabadirwe
- 28890 Gabaldon
- 239254 Gabbigriffith
- 21701 Gabemendoza
- 180143 Gaberogers
- 788501 Gabi
- 72071 Gábor
- 8554 Gabreta
- 333264 Gabriel
- 7026 Gabrielasilang
- 57561 Gabrielegiuli
- 126249 Gabrielgraur
- 355 Gabriella
- 33532 Gabriellacoli
- 34345 Gabriellalui
- 10923 Gabrielleliu
- 20349 Gabrielpinto
- 34539 Gabrielsilva
- 39854 Gabriopiola
- 221853 Gábrisgyula
- 2206 Gabrova
- 9002 Gabrynowicz
- 1665 Gaby
- 218900 Gabybuchholz
- 53137 Gabytutty
- 43971 Gabzdyl
- 14071 Gadabird
- 20539 Gadberry
- 57140 Gaddi
- 2638 Gadolin
- 13551 Gadsden
- 1184 Gaea
- 14224 Gaede
- 132445 Gaertner
- 25421 Gafaran
- 3545 Gaffey
- 1772 Gagarin
- 20850 Gaglani
- 135069 Gagnereau
- 34356 Gahamuriel
- 431436 Gahberg
- 22378 Gaherty
- 10997 Gahm
- 10176 Gaiavettori
- 8451 Gaidai
- 1358 Gaika
- 25368 Gailcolwell
- 10424 Gaillard
- 233214 Gailoxton
- 14092 Gaily
- 9502 Gaimar
- 20041 Gainor
- 8236 Gainsborough
- 14600 Gainsbourg
- 14789 GAISH
- 7259 Gaithersburg
- 1835 Gajdariya
- 213636 Gajdoš
- 3603 Gajdušek
- 43605 Gakuho
- 9786 Gakutensoku
- 183403 Gal
- 70728 Gal-Edd
- 9018 Galache
- 2082 Galahad
- 132824 Galamb
- 6241 Galante
- 1250 Galanthus
- 16809 Galápagos
- 74 Galatea
- 591000 Galaverni
- 4089 Galbraith
- 161962 Galchyn
- 13914 Galegant
- 427 Galene
- 19009 Galenmaly
- 20451 Galeotti
- 77044 Galera-Rosillo
- 22611 Galerkin
- 28007 Galhassin
- 11958 Galiani
- 7413 Galibina
- 697 Galilea
- 3576 Galina
- 545985 Galinaermolenko
- 17859 Galinaryabova
- 32393 Galinato
- 28975 Galinborisov
- 21448 Galindo
- 4080 Galinskij
- 3595 Gallagher
- 6719 Gallaj
- 17897 Gallardo
- 2097 Galle
- 148 Gallia
- 121022 Galliano
- 8764 Gallinago
- 30264 Galluccio
- 9130 Galois
- 54182 Galsarid
- 10184 Galvani
- 1992 Galvarino
- 2317 Galya
- 603021 Galyatető
- 21514 Gamalski
- 379173 Gamaovalia
- 13912 Gammelgarn
- 8538 Gammelmaja
- 8816 Gamow
- 7509 Gamzatov
- 28714 Gandall
- 120461 Gandhi
- 2415 Ganesa
- 13261 Ganeshvenu
- 185535 Gangda
- 17484 Ganghofer
- 202784 Gangkeda
- 22706 Ganguly
- 2515 Gansu
- 3330 Gantrisch
- 1036 Ganymed
- 115885 Ganz
- 343438 Gao
- 79419 Gaolu
- 3704 Gaoshiqi
- 616688 Gaowei
- 204710 Gaoxing
- 38980 Gaoyaojie
- 810619 Gaoyu
- 127658 Gapers
- 25542 Garabedian
- 788890 Garafía
- 552748 Garasdezső
- 27287 Garbarino
- 3076 Garber
- 365159 Garching
- 4442 Garcia
- 47891 García-Migani
- 30209 Garciaarriola
- 212991 Garcíalorca
- 6380 Gardel
- 255587 Gardenia
- 2587 Gardner
- 14793 Gardner-Vandy
- 13033 Gardon
- 147421 Gárdonyi
- 10257 Garecynthia
- 31358 Garethcollins
- 31862 Garfinkle
- 4317 Garibaldi
- 21057 Garikisraelian
- 28715 Garimella
- 1435 Garlena
- 31139 Garnavich
- 14094 Garneau
- 26678 Garner
- 78394 Garossino
- 5066 Garradd
- 28475 Garrett
- 21990 Garretyazzie
- 211381 Garretzuppiger
- 19533 Garrison
- 16997 Garrone
- 9594 Garstang
- 147704 Gartenberg
- 45847 Gartrelle
- 2307 Garuda
- 180 Garumna
- 4735 Gary
- 22406 Garyboyle
- 121132 Garydavis
- 30521 Garyferland
- 7273 Garyhuss
- 33215 Garyjones
- 161750 Garyladd
- 54693 Garymyers
- 20573 Garynadler
- 26541 Garyross
- 51569 Garywessen
- 479553 Garyzema
- 34391 Garyzhan
- 12001 Gasbarini
- 370796 Gasiūnas
- 85015 Gaskell
- 16073 Gaskin
- 54863 Gasnault
- 79893 Gasparelocurto
- 16973 Gaspari
- 951 Gaspra
- 12185 Gasprinskij
- 8937 Gassan
- 7179 Gassendi
- 12883 Gassler
- 25552 Gaster
- 133726 Gateswest
- 8153 Gattacceca
- 780137 Gatterer
- 10185 Gaudi
- 8061 Gaudium
- 10136 Gauguin
- 6478 Gault
- 1001 Gaussia
- 28488 Gautam
- 5444 Gautier
- 21515 Gavini
- 32102 Gavinmoriarty
- 2504 Gaviola
- 22405 Gavioliremo
- 7369 Gavrilin
- 4658 Gavrilov
- 2054 Gawain
- 22527 Gawlik
- 11969 Gay-Lussac
- 31896 Gaydarov
- 22120 Gaylefarrar
- 9556 Gaywray
- 2388 Gaze
- 30278 Gazeas
- 9298 Geake
- 4012 Geballe
- 210414 Gebartolomei
- 26696 Gechenzhang
- 764 Gedania
- 26345 Gedankien
- 12272 Geddylee
- 580123 Gedek
- 353577 Gediminas
- 13027 Geeraerts
- 1267 Geertruida
- 34017 Geeve
- 17855 Geffert
- 1272 Gefion
- 15389 Geflorsch
- 12203 Gehling
- 1777 Gehrels
- 5891 Gehrig
- 27399 Gehring
- 31086 Gehringer
- 4304 Geichenko
- 14413 Geiger
- 2571 Geisei
- 1047 Geisha
- 18032 Geiss
- 4261 Gekko
- 1199 Geldonia
- 23625 Gelfond
- 137066 Gellért-hegy
- 1073 Gellivara
- 8222 Gellner
- 1385 Gelria
- 30176 Gelseyjaymes
- 418689 Gema
- 4782 Gembloux
- 240697 Gemenc
- 11433 Gemmafrisius
- 15957 Gemoore
- 3143 Genecampbell
- 15822 Genefahnestock
- 25227 Genehill
- 17250 Genelucas
- 11756 Geneparker
- 653564 Genersich
- 1237 Geneviève
- 59248 Genevièvesoucail
- 21359 Geng
- 2093 Genichesk
- 12456 Genichiaraki
- 624448 Gennadiyborisov
- 26528 Genniferubin
- 13817 Genobechetti
- 70444 Genovali
- 680 Genoveva
- 31385 Genovevavázquez
- 8824 Genta
- 2872 Gentelec
- 14831 Gentileschi
- 485 Genua
- 18241 Genzel
- 11753 Geoffburbidge
- 129101 Geoffcollyer
- 13018 Geoffjames
- 10289 Geoffperry
- 9193 Geoffreycopland
- 21714 Geoffreywoo
- 12896 Geoffroy
- 1620 Geographos
- 149160 Geojih
- 376 Geometria
- 7578 Georgböhm
- 3854 George
- 6400 Georgealexander
- 16225 Georgebaldo
- 9704 Georgebeekman
- 20350 Georgebrydon
- 144633 Georgecarroll
- 21437 Georgechen
- 22903 Georgeclooney
- 23151 Georgehotz
- 32233 Georgehou
- 16074 Georgekaplan
- 8458 Georgekoenig
- 232259 Georgelawrence
- 28600 Georgelucas
- 6202 Georgemiley
- 264119 Georgeorton
- 30087 Georgeputnam
- 10733 Georgesand
- 37865 Georgesattard
- 807057 Georgescutavi
- 121719 Georgeshaw
- 11740 Georgesmith
- 129154 Georgesondecker
- 22299 Georgesteiner
- 6854 Georgewest
- 80810 Georgewinters
- 225250 Georgfranziska
- 359 Georgia
- 34334 Georgiagrace
- 31954 Georgiebotev
- 9119 Georgpeuerbach
- 60669 Georgpick
- 3700 Geowilliams
- 51178 Geraintjones
- 300 Geraldina
- 1433 Geramtina
- 1227 Geranium
- 1337 Gerarda
- 129176 Gerardcarter
- 8297 Gérardfaure
- 189264 Gerardjeong
- 22519 Gerardklein
- 59045 Gérardlemaitre
- 3945 Gerasimenko
- 2126 Gerasimovich
- 537170 Gerazhukov
- 28251 Gerbaldi
- 9718 Gerbefremov
- 188894 Gerberlouis
- 19494 Gerbs
- 122 Gerda
- 10133 Gerdahorneck
- 10953 Gerdatschira
- 218901 Gerdbuchholz
- 12656 Gerdebruijn
- 8853 Gerdlehmann
- 228893 Gerevich
- 4102 Gergana
- 7215 Gerhard
- 47494 Gerhardangl
- 40764 Gerhardiser
- 6164 Gerhardmüller
- 28967 Gerhardter
- 12678 Gerhardus
- 3346 Gerla
- 663 Gerlinde
- 241 Germania
- 10208 Germanicus
- 13010 Germantitov
- 6079 Gerokurat
- 58608 Geroldrichter
- 338371 Gerritsen
- 340687 Gerrysmith
- 2327 Gershberg
- 8249 Gershwin
- 3887 Gerstner
- 686 Gersuind
- 21369 Gertfinger
- 1382 Gerti
- 710 Gertrud
- 53817 Gertrudebacon
- 618694 Gertrudegrice
- 78433 Gertrudolf
- 5327 Gertwilkens
- 20883 Gervais
- 9079 Gesner
- 113355 Gessler
- 121329 Getzandanner
- 8700 Gevaert
- 600639 Gevreychambertin
- 768325 Geyagugv
- 21551 Geyang
- 4380 Geyer
- 1672 Gezelle
- 118233 Gfrancoferrini
- 23178 Ghaben
- 88055 Ghaf
- 5322 Ghaffari
- 32612 Ghatare
- 9473 Ghent
- 679211 Gheorghe
- 46691 Ghezzi
- 6054 Ghiberti
- 29363 Ghigabartolini
- 10040 Ghillar
- 7112 Ghislaine
- 17927 Ghoshal
- 21840 Ghoshchoudhury
- 141128 Ghyoot
- 3371 Giacconi
- 1756 Giacobini
- 21289 Giacomel
- 15567 Giacomelli
- 11905 Giacometti
- 6877 Giada
- 39849 Giampieri
- 346810 Giancabattisti
- 79810 Giancarlociani
- 21588 Gianelli
- 103015 Gianfrancomarcon
- 10892 Gianna
- 98866 Giannabussolari
- 113684 Giannagianni
- 12907 Giannanilvo
- 8936 Gianni
- 315046 Gianniferrari
- 6515 Giannigalli
- 248970 Giannimorandi
- 17219 Gianninoto
- 214819 Gianotti
- 20353 Gianotto
- 64975 Gianrix
- 172734 Giansimon
- 10334 Gibbon
- 2937 Gibbs
- 66200 Gibis
- 7728 Giblin
- 2742 Gibson
- 1741 Giclas
- 46208 Gicquel
- 11298 Gide
- 28427 Gidwani
- 30172 Giedraitis
- 39557 Gielgud
- 5153 Gierasch
- 136367 Gierlinger
- 10529 Giessenburg
- 4819 Gifford
- 6720 Gifu
- 109712 Giger
- 7916 Gigiproietti
- 10371 Gigli
- 321024 Gijon
- 22189 Gijskatgert
- 12940 Gijsnelemans
- 33476 Gilanareiss
- 429733 Gilbertbaker
- 7459 Gilbertofranco
- 6602 Gilclark
- 1812 Gilgamesh
- 4878 Gilhutton
- 6339 Giliberti
- 400811 Gillesfontaine
- 186142 Gillespie
- 74509 Gillett
- 33222 Gillingham
- 2537 Gilmore
- 603195 Gilmour
- 11006 Gilson
- 27512 Gilstrap
- 3863 Gilyarovskij
- 17066 Ginagallant
- 33261 Ginagarlie
- 112656 Gines
- 8716 Ginestra
- 613 Ginevra
- 5474 Gingasen
- 13271 Gingerbyrd
- 25959 Gingergiovale
- 2658 Gingerich
- 15019 Gingold
- 85197 Ginkgo
- 10526 Ginkogino
- 69500 Ginobartali
- 27056 Ginoloria
- 248908 Ginostrada
- 11098 Ginsberg
- 11084 Giò
- 858334 Gioacchinopecci
- 59417 Giocasilli
- 1599 Giomus
- 6519 Giono
- 611494 Gionti
- 20356 Giopoggiali
- 5148 Giordano
- 27855 Giorgilli
- 6775 Giorgini
- 204896 Giorgiobocca
- 316138 Giorgione
- 73529 Giorgiopalumbo
- 7367 Giotto
- 153078 Giovale
- 66250 Giovanardi
- 111561 Giovanniallevi
- 15036 Giovannianselmi
- 6509 Giovannipratesi
- 16906 Giovannisilva
- 29356 Giovarduino
- 16130 Giovine
- 148525 Gipieroconsigli
- 10450 Girard
- 27095 Girardiwanda
- 109435 Giraud
- 91422 Giraudon
- 15723 Girraween
- 352 Gisela
- 331105 Giselher
- 101902 Gisellaluccone
- 49481 Gisellarubini
- 492 Gismonda
- 10984 Gispen
- 9821 Gitakresáková
- 214953 Giugavazzi
- 35444 Giuliamarconcini
- 10696 Giuliattiwinter
- 20369 Giuliobaù
- 69565 Giulioscarfi
- 17088 Giupalazzolo
- 10267 Giuppone
- 28159 Giuricich
- 46748 Giusacayrel
- 864938 Giuseppekoch
- 11117 Giuseppeolongo
- 199631 Giuseppesprizzi
- 6533 Giuseppina
- 10589 Giusimicela
- 27958 Giussano
- 5249 Giza
- 20370 Gkotsinas
- 7638 Gladman
- 159902 Gladstone
- 3909 Gladys
- 75423 Gladyswest
- 2914 Glärnisch
- 1687 Glarona
- 857 Glasenappia
- 5805 Glasgow
- 32564 Glass
- 19719 Glasser
- 11703 Glassman
- 27506 Glassmeier
- 163626 Glatfelter
- 288 Glauke
- 1870 Glaukos
- 24480 Glavin
- 10099 Glazebrook
- 3616 Glazunov
- 10639 Gleason
- 6108 Glebov
- 29197 Gleim
- 25597 Glendahill
- 3852 Glennford
- 29565 Glenngould
- 31679 Glenngrimmett
- 380480 Glennhawley
- 5062 Glennmiller
- 12936 Glennschneider
- 416273 Glennsnyder
- 192626 Glennunderhill
- 17240 Gletorrence
- 20334 Glewitsky
- 4967 Glia
- 4817 Gliba
- 1823 Gliese
- 5551 Glikson
- 30096 Glindadavidson
- 2205 Glinka
- 7124 Glinos
- 3267 Glo
- 25189 Glockner
- 34047 Gloria
- 31496 Glowacz
- 21608 Gloyna
- 7624 Gluck
- 191551 Glücklich
- 33700 Gluckman
- 25800 Glukhovsky
- 6357 Glushko
- 5861 Glynjones
- 13350 Gmelin
- 8165 Gnädig
- 5084 Gnedin
- 10814 Gnisvärd
- 43028 Gnosca
- 9965 GNU
- 29568 Gobbi-Belcredi
- 184930 Gobbihilda
- 316 Goberta
- 160105 Gobi
- 7094 Godaisan
- 7043 Godart
- 9252 Goddard
- 16444 Godefroy
- 3366 Gödel
- 24935 Godfreyhardy
- 12715 Godin
- 33568 Godishala
- 3018 Godiva
- 4252 Godwin
- 31996 Goecknerwald
- 8268 Goerdeler
- 3047 Goethe
- 1728 Goethe Link
- 5074 Goetzoertel
- 6740 Goff
- 1722 Goffin
- 2361 Gogol
- 12291 Gohnaumann
- 5839 GOI
- 90568 Goibniu
- 101781 Gojira
- 147595 Gojkomitić
- 18027 Gokcay
- 23817 Gokulk
- 7564 Gokumenon
- 5156 Golant
- 3329 Golay
- 32001 Golbin
- 4955 Gold
- 606701 Golda
- 3101 Goldberger
- 4423 Golden
- 16452 Goldfinger
- 8610 Goldhaber
- 20793 Goldinaaron
- 8148 Golding
- 10153 Goldman
- 3805 Goldreich
- 1614 Goldschmidt
- 5393 Goldstein
- 4433 Goldstone
- 6489 Golevka
- 6875 Golgi
- 1226 Golia
- 7161 Golitsyn
- 237265 Golobokov
- 6456 Golombek
- 15675 Goloseevo
- 7729 Golovanov
- 220418 Golovyno
- 2466 Golson
- 216897 Golubev
- 560522 Gombaszögi
- 17856 Gomes
- 20374 Gomesjunior
- 90140 Gómezdonet
- 7035 Gomi
- 5508 Gomyou
- 5361 Goncharov
- 7998 Gonczi
- 1891 Gondola
- 1562 Gondolatsch
- 21523 GONG
- 225088 Gonggong
- 31179 Gongju
- 28968 Gongmiaoxin
- 22909 Gongmyunglee
- 19258 Gongyi
- 1177 Gonnessia
- 30138 Gonyea
- 15628 Gonzales
- 14918 Gonzálezalegre
- 22526 Gonzálezsuárez
- 16857 Goodall
- 11790 Goode
- 12911 Goodhue
- 14803 Gooding
- 4239 Goodman
- 3116 Goodricke
- 8202 Gooley
- 34156 Gopalakrishnan
- 7754 Gopalan
- 8783 Gopasyuk
- 4654 Gorʹkavyj
- 9852 Gora
- 176380 Goran
- 179876 Goranpichler
- 4509 Gorbatskij
- 295841 Gorbulin
- 5014 Gorchakov
- 10083 Gordonanderson
- 129214 Gordoncasto
- 305 Gordonia
- 8013 Gordonmoore
- 90579 Gordonnelson
- 166747 Gordonrichards
- 20298 Gordonsu
- 93164 Gordontelepun
- 114725 Gordonwalker
- 120352 Gordonwong
- 350838 Gorelysheva
- 7801 Goretti
- 79086 Gorgasali
- 681 Gorgo
- 48373 Gorgythion
- 11704 Gorin
- 7675 Gorizia
- 17198 Gorjup
- 2768 Gorky
- 3818 Gorlitsa
- 551014 Gorman
- 5988 Gorodnitskij
- 32002 Gorokhovsky
- 212465 Goroshky
- 25373 Gorsch
- 2723 Gorshkov
- 5075 Goryachev
- 21858 Gosal
- 9490 Gosemeijer
- 22402 Goshi
- 119846 Goshiina
- 102621 Goshinosato
- 3585 Goshirakawa
- 23776 Gosset
- 3640 Gostin
- 10551 Göteborg
- 10141 Gotenba
- 1346 Gotha
- 1710 Gothard
- 1188 Gothlandia
- 1049 Gotho
- 184878 Gotlib
- 2621 Goto
- 9648 Gotouhideo
- 13576 Gotoyoshi
- 7618 Gotoyukichi
- 18668 Gottesman
- 9507 Gottfried
- 11588 Gottfriedkeller
- 6841 Gottfriedkirch
- 33701 Gotthold
- 2278 Götz
- 27718 Gouda
- 9688 Goudsmit
- 29446 Gouguenheim
- 9708 Gouka
- 22022 Gould
- 6948 Gounelle
- 23877 Gourmaud
- 23777 Goursat
- 49108 Gouttesolard
- 8371 Goven
- 10986 Govert
- 293707 Govoradloanatoly
- 4430 Govorukhin
- 9677 Gowlandhopkins
- 6592 Goya
- 120367 Grabow
- 9459 Gracecai
- 50739 Gracecook
- 19428 Gracehsu
- 9341 Gracekelly
- 27253 Graceleanor
- 34268 Gracetian
- 3632 Grachevka
- 4471 Graculus
- 3253 Gradie
- 231842 Graemekeleher
- 142562 Graetz
- 3202 Graff
- 3541 Graham
- 9617 Grahamchapman
- 101491 Grahamcrombie
- 732472 Grahamhill
- 333373 Grahammiller
- 5479 Grahamryder
- 4247 Grahamsmith
- 33205 Graigmarx
- 175730 Gramastetten
- 37840 Gramegna
- 43999 Gramigna
- 2666 Gramme
- 18728 Grammier
- 10960 Gran Sasso
- 1159 Granada
- 24681 Granados
- 11007 Granahan
- 353595 Grancanaria
- 8039 Grandprism
- 4885 Grange
- 1451 Granö
- 3154 Grant
- 130088 Grantcunningham
- 11693 Grantelliott
- 25183 Grantfisher
- 13414 Grantham
- 112797 Grantjudy
- 19413 Grantlewis
- 210532 Grantmckee
- 13752 Grantstokes
- 28760 Grantwomble
- 1661 Granule
- 14328 Granvik
- 9027 Graps
- 11496 Grass
- 34708 Grasset
- 424 Gratia
- 30798 Graubünden
- 18871 Grauer
- 9175 Graun
- 21648 Gravanschaik
- 18824 Graves
- 9682 Gravesande
- 236616 Gray
- 20378 Graykowski
- 12517 Grayzeck
- 2806 Graz
- 22500 Grazianoventre
- 11026 Greatbotkin
- 25541 Greathouse
- 9899 Greaves
- 24749 Grebel
- 4268 Grebenikov
- 3148 Grechko
- 668982 Grechuta
- 30785 Greeley
- 12016 Green
- 11067 Greenancy
- 160556 Greenaugh
- 3387 Greenberg
- 187638 Greenewalt
- 20034 Greenhalgh
- 19631 Greensleeves
- 4612 Greenstein
- 12121 Greenwald
- 2830 Greenwich
- 30173 Greenwood
- 8974 Gregaria
- 12192 Gregbollendonk
- 614641 Gregbredthauer
- 9984 Gregbryant
- 175204 Gregbyrne
- 223339 Gregdunn
- 30365 Gregduran
- 273987 Greggwade
- 31885 Greggweger
- 27291 Greghansen
- 10065 Greglisk
- 11737 Gregneat
- 341359 Gregneumann
- 16046 Gregnorman
- 95935 Grego
- 224027 Grégoire
- 20380 Grégoirehenry
- 14659 Gregoriana
- 100019 Gregorianik
- 34004 Gregorini
- 296446 Gregorstadler
- 2527 Gregory
- 233459 Gregquicke
- 251015 Gregusspál
- 10114 Greifswald
- 541982 Grendel
- 7462 Grenoble
- 15523 Grenville
- 4396 Gressmann
- 19679 Gretabetteo
- 10658 Gretadevries
- 20336 Gretamills
- 984 Gretia
- 3280 Grétry
- 92389 Gretskij
- 552733 Grétsylászló
- 2837 Griboedov
- 25098 Gridnev
- 4872 Grieg
- 7807 Grier
- 11547 Griesser
- 2049 Grietje
- 4451 Grieve
- 4995 Griffin
- 121483 Griffinjayne
- 128177 Griffioen
- 16253 Griffis
- 11707 Grigery
- 10305 Grignard
- 12219 Grigorʹev
- 8664 Grigorijrichters
- 30933 Grillparzer
- 129743 Grimaldi
- 6912 Grimm
- 27410 Grimmett
- 24090 Grindavík
- 2786 Grinevia
- 11874 Gringauz
- 207899 Grinmalia
- 22410 Grinspoon
- 1362 Griqua
- 858332 Grischun
- 493 Griseldis
- 15203 Grishanin
- 2161 Grissom
- 12677 Gritsavage
- 14345 Gritsevich
- 21614 Grochowski
- 34432 Groebe
- 1674 Groeneveld
- 16908 Groeselenberg
- 2565 Grögler
- 16399 Grokhovsky
- 4920 Gromov
- 10048 Grönbech
- 96217 Gronchi
- 18016 Grondahl
- 12652 Groningen
- 5129 Groom
- 5657 Groombridge
- 52873 Grootaerd
- 9577 Gropius
- 33800 Gross
- 30090 Grossano
- 36169 Grosseteste
- 4565 Grossman
- 229425 Grosspointner
- 6886 Grote
- 13278 Grotecloss
- 9994 Grotius
- 10812 Grötlingbo
- 16280 Groussin
- 217603 Grove Creek
- 17950 Grover
- 19429 Grubaugh
- 1058 Grubba
- 320977 Grudziądz
- 70449 Gruebel
- 26355 Grueber
- 4571 Grumiaux
- 4240 Grün
- 13927 Grundy
- 9645 Grünewald
- 263391 Grüntzig
- 210031 Grupamocarta
- 6561 Gruppetta
- 6516 Gruss
- 31500 Grutzik
- 3336 Grygar
- 24662 Gryll
- 496 Gryphia
- 6136 Gryphon
- 1993 Guacolda
- 26800 Gualtierotrucco
- 7497 Guangcaishiye
- 2185 Guangdong
- 31473 Guangning
- 2655 Guangxi
- 3048 Guangzhou
- 21615 Guardamano
- 8124 Guardi
- 19185 Guarneri
- 10797 Guatemala
- 13509 Guayaquil
- 2544 Gubarev
- 4860 Gubbio
- 39748 Guccini
- 453256 Gucevičius
- 171448 Guchaohao
- 541565 Gucklerkároly
- 2595 Gudiachvili
- 24126 Gudjonson
- 328 Gudrun
- 799 Gudula
- 2105 Gudy
- 264068 Gudzinevičiūtė
- 19875 Guedes
- 185216 Gueiren
- 210997 Guenat
- 63363 Guengerich
- 11537 Guericke
- 196945 Guerin
- 2293 Guernica
- 13412 Guerrieri
- 15005 Guerriero
- 4325 Guest
- 11942 Guettard
- 13328 Guetter
- 38269 Gueymard
- 21616 Guhagilford
- 33335 Guibert
- 120361 Guido
- 331605 Guidogryseels
- 31244 Guidomonzino
- 10605 Guidoni
- 309426 Guidoschwarz
- 27270 Guidotti
- 30208 Guigarcia
- 56788 Guilbertlepoutre
- 11353 Guillaume
- 10354 Guillaumebudé
- 47052 Guillaumefaury
- 186007 Guilleminet
- 3649 Guillermina
- 25010 Guillermotimoner
- 294204 Guinan
- 2483 Guinevere
- 12064 Guiraudon
- 1960 Guisan
- 19410 Guisard
- 58941 Guishida
- 27938 Guislain
- 2632 Guizhou
- 23722 Gulak
- 21429 Gulati
- 5276 Gulkis
- 11532 Gullin
- 6783 Gulyaev
- 523954 Guman
- 4556 Gumilyov
- 25424 Gunasekaran
- 721153 Gunda
- 28564 Gunderman
- 29575 Gundlapalli
- 73637 Guneus
- 891 Gunhild
- 983 Gunila
- 657 Gunlöd
- 3829 Gunma
- 18243 Gunn
- 9024 Gunnargraps
- 10265 Gunnarsson
- 27515 Gunnels
- 961 Gunnie
- 1944 Günter
- 19993 Günterseeber
- 429033 Günterwendt
- 69287 Günthereichhorn
- 257234 Güntherkurtze
- 21040 Güntherreitz
- 241276 Guntramlampert
- 4586 Gunvor
- 28513 Guo
- 2012 Guo Shou-Jing
- 189018 Guokeda
- 212796 Guoyonghuai
- 24301 Gural
- 29620 Gurbanikaur
- 14814 Gurij
- 9510 Gurnemanz
- 65658 Gurnikovskaya
- 73692 Gürtler
- 157271 Gurtovenko
- 6679 Gurzhij
- 8248 Gurzuf
- 58145 Gus
- 32944 Gussalli
- 100084 Gußmann
- 11295 Gustaflarsson
- 5498 Gustafsson
- 535530 Gustavborn
- 14980 Gustavbrom
- 37683 Gustaveeiffel
- 12637 Gustavleonhardt
- 458063 Gustavomuler
- 34541 Gustavosanreyes
- 85773 Gutbezahl
- 777 Gutemberga
- 3419 Guth
- 13082 Gutiérrez
- 13279 Gutman
- 30562 Güttler
- 34472 Guxieran
- 325558 Guyane
- 317715 Guydetienne
- 519419 Guyewang
- 3697 Guyhurst
- 10946 Guyidong
- 73342 Guyunusa
- 23758 Guyuzhou
- 72834 Guywells
- 85878 Guzik
- 34716 Guzzo
- 6574 Gvishiani
- 12252 Gwangju
- 10870 Gwendolen
- 358376 Gwyn
- 5637 Gyas
- 806 Gyldénia
- 5030 Gyldenkerne
- 5138 Gyoda
- 444 Gyptis
- 13352 Gyssens
- 15577 Gywilliams
back to top

== See also ==
- List of minor planet discoverers
- List of observatory codes
- Meanings of minor planet names § Index
