= Gawain (disambiguation) =

Gawain is, in Arthurian legend, King Arthur's nephew and one of the Knights of the Round Table.

Gawain may also refer to:

== People ==
- Gawain Westray Bell (1909–1995), British colonial administrator and Governor of Northern Nigeria
- Gawain Briars (born 1958), English squash player and lawyer
- Gawain Erland Cooper, Orcadian and Scottish folk guitarist and singer
- Gawain or Gavin Douglas (c. 1474–1522), Scottish bishop, makar (poet or bard) and translator
- Gawain Edwards, a pen name of George Edward Pendray (1901–1987), American public relations counselor, author and founder of the American Interplanetary Society
- Gawain Maroroa Jones (born 1987), English chess grandmaster
- Shakti Gawain (1948–2018), American New Age and personal development writer

== Other uses ==
- Gawain (opera), first performed in 1991
- Gawain, a character in the American children's television show Between the Lions
- 2054 Gawain, an asteroid

== See also ==
- Pearl Poet or the "Gawain Poet", 14th-century English author
- Gwain Noot Sexton (1909–2007), Canadian-born American author, illustrator, visual artist, fashion designer
