= Gotho =

Gotho may refer to:

- 1049 Gotho, asteroid in Asteroid belt
- Heinrich Gotho (1872–1938), Austrian film actor
- Mbah Gotho Indonesian man who has claimed to be the oldest person
