= Geometria =

The term geometria may refer to:

- Geometry, a branch of mathematics
- Geometria (film), a 1987 short film by Guillermo del Toro
- 376 Geometria, a main belt asteroid
