= 960 Birgit =

Background asteroid

Discovery
- Discovered by: K. Reinmuth
- Discovery site: Heidelberg Obs.
- Discovery date: 1 October 1921

Designations
- Named after: Birgit Asplind (daughter of Bror Asplind)
- Alternative designations: A921 TG · 1921 KH
- Minor planet category: main-belt · (inner) background (Florian)

Orbital characteristics
- Epoch 31 May 2020 (JD 2459000.5)
- Uncertainty parameter 0
- Observation arc: 98.26 yr (35,889 d)
- Aphelion: 2.6203 AU
- Perihelion: 1.8770 AU
- Semi-major axis: 2.2486 AU
- Eccentricity: 0.1653
- Orbital period (sidereal): 3.37 yr (1,232 d)
- Mean anomaly: 123.62°
- Mean motion: 0° 17^{m} 32.28^{s} / day
- Inclination: 3.0260°
- Longitude of ascending node: 249.16°
- Argument of perihelion: 88.040°

Physical characteristics
- Mean diameter: 7.506±0.110 km
- Synodic rotation period: 8.85±0.05 h (Note: Lightcurve plot of (960) Birgit (1 of 3), Agnieszka Kryszczyńska et al (2012). LCDB quality code of 2+. Summary figures at the LCDB and CDS-VizieR.)
- Geometric albedo: 0.217±0.027
- Spectral type: S (assumed)
- Absolute magnitude (H): 12.5

960 Birgit (prov. designation: A921 TG or 1921 KH) is a background asteroid, approximately 8 kilometers (5 miles) in diameter, located in the Florian region of the inner asteroid belt. It was discovered on 1 October 1921, by astronomer Karl Reinmuth at the Heidelberg Observatory in southern Germany. The possibly S-type asteroid has a rotation period of 8.9 hours. It was named after Birgit Asplind, daughter of Swedish astronomer Bror Asplind (1890–1954).

== Orbit and classification ==
Located in the Florian region, Birgit is a non-family asteroid of the main belt's background population when applying the hierarchical clustering method to its proper orbital elements. It orbits the Sun in the inner asteroid belt at a distance of 1.9–2.6 AU once every 3 years and 4 months (1,232 days; semi-major axis of 2.25 AU). Its orbit has an eccentricity of 0.17 and an inclination of 3° with respect to the ecliptic. The body's observation arc begins at Heidelberg on 25 October 1925, three weeks after its official discovery observation.

== Naming ==
This minor planet was named after Birgit Asplind, daughter of Swedish astronomer Bror Ansgar Asplind (1890–1954). Asteroids 958 Asplinda, 959 Arne and 961 Gunnie are named after him and his other two children, respectively. The naming was mentioned in The Names of the Minor Planets by Paul Herget in 1955 (H 92).

== Physical characteristics ==
Based on its determined albedo, Birgit is an assumed S-type asteroid. The albedo determined by the Wide-field Infrared Survey Explorer (WISE) for this asteroid agrees with that assumption (see below).

=== Rotation period ===
In February 2007, a rotational lightcurve of Birgit was obtained from photometric observations by Agnieszka Kryszczyńska at Poznań Observatory, Poland, and international collaborators. Lightcurve analysis gave a rotation period of 8.85±0.05 hours with a brightness variation of 0.28±0.02 magnitude (U=2+). The result supersedes observations by Federico Manzini, Roberto Crippa, and Pierre Antonini from August 2005, who determined a poorly rated period of 17.3558±0.0005 hours with an amplitude of 0.25±0.01 magnitude (U=1+).

=== Diameter and albedo ===
According to the survey carried out by the NEOWISE mission of NASA's WISE telescope, Birgit measures 7.506±0.110 kilometers in diameter and its surface has an albedo of 0.217±0.027. Another published measurement by the WISE team gives a mean diameter of 8.154±0.566 km with an albedo of 0.291±0.044. The Collaborative Asteroid Lightcurve Link assumes a standard albedo for a stony asteroid of 0.20 and calculates a diameter of 9.40 kilometers based on an absolute magnitude of 12.5.
