= 959 Arne =

Background asteroid and slow rotator

Discovery
- Discovered by: K. Reinmuth
- Discovery site: Heidelberg Obs.
- Discovery date: 30 September 1921

Designations
- Named after: Arne Asplind (son of Bror Asplind)
- Alternative designations: A921 SE · 1927 YD; 1952 DD_{2} · 1960 OF; A916 YB · 1921 KF
- Minor planet category: main-belt · (outer) background

Orbital characteristics
- Epoch 31 May 2020 (JD 2459000.5)
- Uncertainty parameter 0
- Observation arc: 103.03 yr (37,630 d)
- Aphelion: 3.8813 AU
- Perihelion: 2.4752 AU
- Semi-major axis: 3.1782 AU
- Eccentricity: 0.2212
- Orbital period (sidereal): 5.67 yr (2,070 d)
- Mean anomaly: 86.935°
- Mean motion: 0° 10^{m} 26.4^{s} / day
- Inclination: 4.4967°
- Longitude of ascending node: 58.521°
- Argument of perihelion: 333.57°

Physical characteristics
- Mean diameter: 45.176±0.350 km; 53.09±0.75 km; 57.42±1.5 km
- Synodic rotation period: 123.7±0.1 h
- Geometric albedo: 0.0446±0.002 0.054±0.002; 0.067±0.004
- Spectral type: X (SDSS-MOC)
- Absolute magnitude (H): 10.8

959 Arne (prov. designation: A921 SE or 1921 KF) is a background asteroid and slow rotator, approximately 52 kilometers (32 miles) in diameter, located in the outer region of the asteroid belt. It was discovered by German astronomer Karl Reinmuth at the Heidelberg-Königstuhl State Observatory on 30 September 1921. The X-type asteroid has an exceptionally long rotation period of 123.7 hours. It was named after Arne Asplind, son of Swedish astronomer Bror Asplind (1890–1954).

== Orbit and classification ==
Arne is a non-family asteroid of the main belt's background population when applying the hierarchical clustering method to its proper orbital elements. It orbits the Sun in the outer asteroid belt at a distance of 2.5–3.9 AU once every 5 years and 8 months (2,070 days; semi-major axis of 3.18 AU). Its orbit has an eccentricity of 0.22 and an inclination of 4° with respect to the ecliptic. The body's observation arc begins with its first observation as A916 YB (1916 YB) at Heidelberg Observatory on 27 December 1916, almost 5 years prior to its official discovery observation on 30 September 1921.

== Naming ==
This minor planet was named after Arne Asplind, son of Swedish astronomer Bror Ansgar Asplind (1890–1954). Asteroids 958 Asplinda, 960 Birgit and 961 Gunnie are named after him and his two daughters, respectively. The naming was mentioned in The Names of the Minor Planets by Paul Herget in 1955 (H 92).

== Physical characteristics ==
In the SDSS-based taxonomy, Arne an X-type asteroid.

=== Rotation period ===
In November 2007, a rotational lightcurve of Arne was obtained from photometric observations by Robert Stephens at GMARS (G79) and Santana observatories (646) in California. Analysis gave a bimodal lightcurve with an exceptionally long rotation period of 123.7±0.1 hours and a brightness amplitude of 0.24±0.05 magnitude (U=3−). The results supersede an incorrect period of 8.60 hours from a noisy lightcurve taken by Larry E. Robinson at Sunflower Observatory (739) in Kansas in November 2001 (U=1).

=== Diameter and albedo ===
According to the surveys carried out by the NEOWISE mission of NASA's Wide-field Infrared Survey Explorer (WISE), the Japanese Akari satellite, and the Infrared Astronomical Satellite IRAS, Arne measures 45.176±0.350, 53.09±0.75 and 57.42±1.5 kilometers in diameter, and its surface has an albedo of 0.0446±0.002, 0.054±0.002 and 0.067±0.004, respectively.

Other published measurements by the WISE team also includes mean-diameters of 46.687±0.665 km 51.539±0.547 km, 52.57±13.47 km and 61.45±20.10 km with corresponding albedos of 0.067±0.004, 0.0553±0.0301, 0.03±0.05 and 0.03±0.02. The Collaborative Asteroid Lightcurve Link derives an albedo of 0.0258 and a diameter of 57.20 km based on an absolute magnitude of 10.8. An asteroid occultation on 3 February 2015, gave a best-fit ellipse dimension of 53.0 × 53.0 kilometers. These timed observations are taken when the asteroid passes in front of a distant star. However the quality of the measurements are poorly rated.
