= 958 Asplinda =

Hilda asteroid

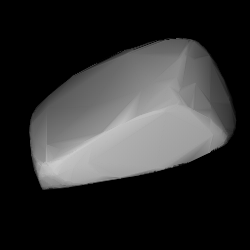
- Modelled shape of Asplinda from its lightcurve

Discovery
- Discovered by: K. Reinmuth
- Discovery site: Heidelberg Obs.
- Discovery date: 28 September 1921

Designations
- Named after: Bror A. Asplind (Swedish astronomer)
- Alternative designations: A921 SD · 1921 KC
- Minor planet category: main-belt · (outer); Hilda

Orbital characteristics
- Epoch 31 May 2020 (JD 2459000.5)
- Uncertainty parameter 0
- Observation arc: 97.88 yr (35,751 d)
- Aphelion: 4.7204 AU
- Perihelion: 3.2494 AU
- Semi-major axis: 3.9849 AU
- Eccentricity: 0.1846
- Orbital period (sidereal): 7.95 yr (2,905 d)
- Mean anomaly: 152.91°
- Mean motion: 0° 7^{m} 26.04^{s} / day
- Inclination: 5.6288°
- Longitude of ascending node: 343.12°
- Argument of perihelion: 92.950°
- Jupiter MOID: 0.7147 AU
- T_{Jupiter}: 3.0180

Physical characteristics
- Mean diameter: 45.112±0.405 km; 47.08±6.2 km; 48.57±1.51 km
- Synodic rotation period: 16.543±0.007 h (Note: Lightcurve plot of (958) Asplinda by Brian D. Warner, Robert D. Stephens and Daniel R. Coley (2017). Rotation period 16.543±0.007 hours with a brightness amplitude of 0.64±0.02 mag. Quality code of 3–. Summary figures for at the LCDB and the CS3.)
- Pole ecliptic latitude: (228.0°, 33.0°) (λ_{1}/β_{1}); (46.0°, 45.0°) (λ_{2}/β_{2})
- Geometric albedo: 0.041±0.003; 0.0415±0.013; 0.045±0.008
- Spectral type: C (assumed); B–V = 0.834±0.082
- Absolute magnitude (H): 10.4

958 Asplinda (prov. designation: A921 SD or 1921 KC) is a resonant Hilda asteroid, approximately 47 kilometers (29 miles) in diameter, located in the outermost region of the asteroid belt. It was discovered on 28 September 1921, by astronomer Karl Reinmuth at the Heidelberg Observatory in southwest Germany. The assumed C-type asteroid has a rotation period of 16.5 hours and is likely elongated in shape. It was named after Swedish astronomer Bror Asplind (1890–1954).

== Orbit and classification ==
Asplinda is a member of the distant orbital Hilda group of asteroids, which stay in a 3:2 orbital resonance with Jupiter. It is however not a member of the collisional Hilda family (001) but a non-family asteroid of the background population when applying the hierarchical clustering method to its proper orbital elements. It orbits the Sun in the outermost asteroid belt at a distance of 3.2–4.7 AU once every 7 years and 11 months (2,905 days; semi-major axis of 3.98 AU). Its orbit has an eccentricity of 0.18 and an inclination of 6° with respect to the ecliptic. The body's observation arc begins at Heidelberg on 24 October 1921, four weeks after its official discovery observation.

== Naming ==
This minor planet was named after Bror Ansgar Asplind (1890–1954), a Swedish astronomer and orbit computer. The following, sequentially numbered asteroids 959 Arne, 960 Birgit and 961 Gunnie are named after his three children, respectively. The naming was mentioned in The Names of the Minor Planets by Paul Herget in 1955 (H 92).

== Physical characteristics ==
No spectral type has been published for Asplinda. As an Hildian asteroid with a low albedo (see below) it is a carbonaceous C-type asteroid (assumed), or possibly a D-type or P-type asteroid, which are very common among the Hildian and more distant Jupiter trojan population.

=== Rotation period and poles ===
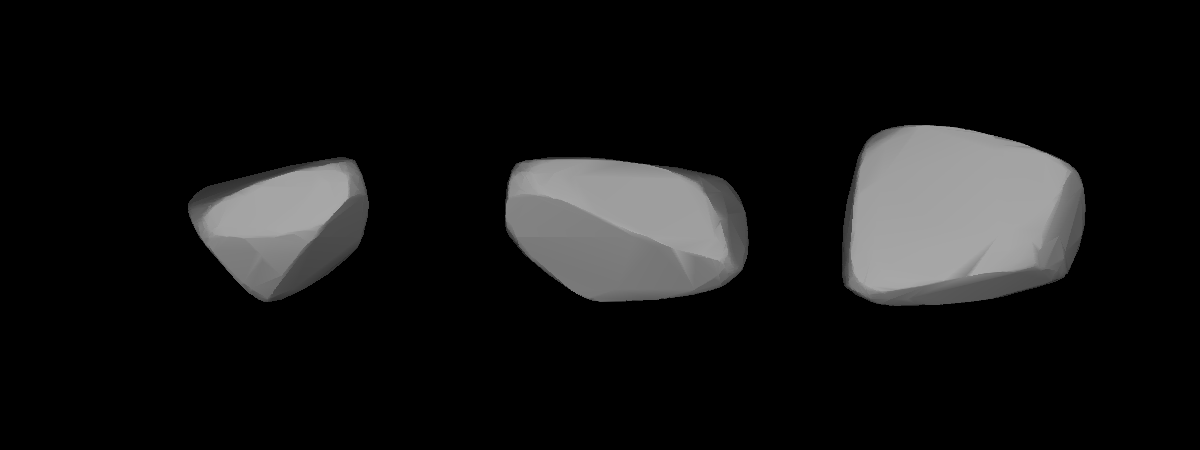
3D-model of Asplinda based on its lightcurve

In December 2017, a rotational lightcurve of Asplinda was obtained from photometric observations by Brian Warner, Robert Stephens and Daniel Coley at the Center for Solar System Studies (U81) in California. Lightcurve analysis gave a rotation period of 16.543±0.007 hours with a high brightness amplitude of 0.64±0.02 magnitude, indicative of an elongated, non-spherical shape (U=3−). The results supersedes previous observations with a period determination of 17.55±0.03 h by the same astronomers in 2016, and a period of 25.3 h published by Mats Dahlgren in 1998 (U=2+/2).

The 2017 observations by Warner, Stephens and Coley also gave two spin axes of (228.0°, 33.0°) and (46.0°, 45.0°) in ecliptic coordinates (λ, β) and a sidereal period of 16.556100±0.000002 hours.

These results supersede the asteroid's 2016 modeled spin axes and lightcurve with a sidereal period of 16.556100±0.000002 hours based on data from the Uppsala Asteroid Photometric Catalogue, the Palomar Transient Factory survey, and individual observers led by Czech astronomers Josef Hanuš and Josef Ďurech, as well as sparse-in-time photometry from the NOFS, the Catalina Sky Survey, and the La Palma surveys (950).

=== Diameter and albedo ===
According to the surveys carried out by the NEOWISE mission of NASA's Wide-field Infrared Survey Explorer (WISE), the Infrared Astronomical Satellite IRAS, and the Japanese Akari satellite, Asplinda measures 45.112±0.405, 47.08±6.2 and 48.57±1.51 kilometers in diameter, and its surface has an albedo of 0.045±0.008, 0.0415±0.013 and 0.041±0.003, respectively.

Another published measurement by the WISE team also gives a mean-diameters of 45.117±0.091 km with corresponding albedo of 0.045±0.005. The Collaborative Asteroid Lightcurve Link adopts the results from IRAS, that is, an albedo of 0.0415 and a diameter of 47.08 km based on an absolute magnitude of 10.71. An asteroid occultation on 15 August 2006, gave a best-fit ellipse dimension of 47.0 × 47.0 kilometers. These timed observations are taken when the asteroid passes in front of a distant star. However the quality of the measurement is poorly rated.
