= 6102 Visby =

Stony background asteroid

Discovery
- Discovered by: UESAC
- Discovery site: La Silla Obs.
- Discovery date: 21 March 1993

Designations
- Named after: Visby (Swedish town)
- Alternative designations: 1993 FQ_{25} · 1990 TV_{11} 1991 YQ_{2}
- Minor planet category: main-belt · (middle) background

Orbital characteristics
- Epoch 4 September 2017 (JD 2458000.5)
- Uncertainty parameter 0
- Observation arc: 27.87 yr (10,178 days)
- Aphelion: 3.0260 AU
- Perihelion: 2.1704 AU
- Semi-major axis: 2.5982 AU
- Eccentricity: 0.1646
- Orbital period (sidereal): 4.19 yr (1,530 days)
- Mean anomaly: 198.43°
- Mean motion: 0° 14^{m} 7.08^{s} / day
- Inclination: 1.7601°
- Longitude of ascending node: 310.81°
- Argument of perihelion: 358.44°

Physical characteristics
- Dimensions: 4.473±0.168 km 5.16 km (calculated)
- Synodic rotation period: 3.28±0.01 h
- Geometric albedo: 0.20 (assumed); 0.292±0.077
- Spectral type: S
- Absolute magnitude (H): 13.7 · 13.72±0.21 · 13.76±0.18 (R) · 13.8

6102 Visby, provisional designation 1993 FQ_{25}, is a stony background asteroid from the central region of the asteroid belt, approximately 5 kilometers (3.1 miles) in diameter.

The asteroid was discovered on 21 March 1993, during the Uppsala-ESO Survey of Asteroids and Comets (UESAC) at the ESO's La Silla Observatory site in northern Chile. It is UESAC's lowest numbered discoveries (among more than 1,100 asteroids). It was named for the Swedish town of Visby.

== Orbit and classification ==
Visby is a non-family asteroid from the main belt's background population. It orbits the Sun in the central main-belt at a distance of 2.2–3.0 AU once every 4 years and 2 months (1,530 days). Its orbit has an eccentricity of 0.16 and an inclination of 2° with respect to the ecliptic. A first precovery was taken at Palomar Observatory in 1989, extending the body's observation arc by 4 years prior to its official discovery observation at La Silla.

== Naming ==
This minor planet was named after Visby, a Swedish town on the island of Gotland, known for its medieval and Hanseatic history (also see List of Gotland-related asteroids). The official naming citation was published by the Minor Planet Center on 28 September 1999 (M.P.C. 36126).

== Physical characteristics ==
Visby has been characterized as a common S-type asteroid by PanSTARRS' photometric survey.

=== Rotation period ===
A rotational lightcurve of Visby was obtained from photometric observations at the Palomar Transient Factory in February 2013. It gave a rotation period of 3.28±0.01 hours with a brightness variation of 0.28 in magnitude (U=2+).

=== Diameter and albedo ===
According to the survey carried out by the NEOWISE mission of NASA's Wide-field Infrared Survey Explorer, Visby measures 4.5 kilometers in diameter and its surface has an albedo of 0.29, while the Collaborative Asteroid Lightcurve Link assumes a standard albedo for stony asteroids of 0.20 and calculates a diameter of 5.2 kilometers.
