= (39546) 1992 DT5 =

Dark Hoffmeister asteroid

(39546) 1992 DT_{5}
Discovery
- Discovered by: UESAC
- Discovery site: La Silla Obs.
- Discovery date: 29 February 1992

Designations
- Alternative designations: 1999 TA_{162}
- Minor planet category: main-belt · (middle); Hoffmeister

Orbital characteristics
- Epoch 23 March 2018 (JD 2458200.5)
- Uncertainty parameter 0
- Observation arc: 25.68 yr (9,378 d)
- Aphelion: 2.8587 AU
- Perihelion: 2.7254 AU
- Semi-major axis: 2.7921 AU
- Eccentricity: 0.0239
- Orbital period (sidereal): 4.67 yr (1,704 d)
- Mean anomaly: 276.01°
- Mean motion: 0° 12^{m} 40.68^{s} / day
- Inclination: 5.2622°
- Longitude of ascending node: 150.60°
- Argument of perihelion: 304.53°

Physical characteristics
- Mean diameter: 5.34 km (calculated)
- Synodic rotation period: 1167±100 h
- Geometric albedo: 0.057 (assumed)
- Spectral type: C (assumed)
- Absolute magnitude (H): 14.641±0.007 (R); 14.7; 14.88±0.30; 15.09

(39546) 1992 DT_{5} is a dark Hoffmeister asteroid and exceptionally slow rotator from the central region of the asteroid belt, approximately 5.3 kilometers (3.3 miles) in diameter. The likely elongated C-type asteroid was discovered on 29 February 1992, by the Uppsala–ESO Survey of Asteroids and Comets at ESO's La Silla astronomical observatory site in northern Chile.

== Orbit and classification ==
1992 DT_{5} is an attributed member of the very compact Hoffmeister family (519), which, based upon its low albedo, was most likely formed from the breakup of a 50–100 kilometer-sized, carbon-rich parent body within the past several hundred million years. The family consist of nearly 2000 known members and its namesake is the asteroid 1726 Hoffmeister.

It orbits the Sun in the central main-belt at a distance of 2.7–2.9 AU once every 4 years and 8 months (1,704 days; semi-major axis of 2.79 AU). Its orbit has an eccentricity of 0.02 and an inclination of 5° with respect to the ecliptic. The body's observation arc begins with its discovery observation at La Silla in February 1992.

== Physical characteristics ==
1992 DT_{5} is an assumed carbonaceous C-type asteroid. The overall spectral type of the Hoffmeister family is that of a C- and F-type.

=== Rotation period ===
In September 2013, a rotational lightcurve for this asteroid was obtained from photometric observations in the R-band at the Palomar Transient Factory in California. It gave an exceptionally long rotation period of 1167 hours with an estimated error margin of ±100 hours. According to the Light Curve Data Base (LCDB), it is the 8th slowest rotating minor planet known to exist. Due to its high brightness amplitude of 0.80 magnitude, the body has a likely elongated shape (U=2).

=== Diameter and albedo ===
The Collaborative Asteroid Lightcurve Link assumes a standard albedo for carbonaceous asteroids of 0.057 and calculates a diameter of 5.3 kilometers based on an absolute magnitude of 15.09.

== Numbering and naming ==
This minor planet was numbered by the Minor Planet Center on 26 May 2002 (M.P.C. 45660). As of 2018, it has not been named.
