= (7348) 1993 FJ22 =

Main-belt asteroid

(7348) 1993 FJ_{22}
Discovery
- Discovered by: UESAC
- Discovery site: La Silla Obs.
- Discovery date: 21 March 1993

Designations
- Alternative designations: 1933 FU · 1978 NM_{5} · 1991 XF_{3}
- Minor planet category: main-belt · Themis

Orbital characteristics
- Epoch 4 September 2017 (JD 2458000.5)
- Uncertainty parameter 0
- Observation arc: 84.28 yr (30,783 days)
- Aphelion: 3.4232 AU
- Perihelion: 2.7623 AU
- Semi-major axis: 3.0927 AU
- Eccentricity: 0.1069
- Orbital period (sidereal): 5.44 yr (1,987 days)
- Mean anomaly: 206.95°
- Inclination: 0.8715°
- Longitude of ascending node: 11.015°
- Argument of perihelion: 151.44°

Physical characteristics
- Dimensions: 9.91 km (calculated)
- Synodic rotation period: 3.470±0.020 h 3.4735±0.0031 h
- Geometric albedo: 0.08 (assumed)
- Spectral type: C
- Absolute magnitude (H): 12.9 · 12.780±0.050 · 12.929±0.001 · 13.38

(7348) 1993 FJ_{22} is a carbonaceous, Themistian asteroid from the outer region of the asteroid belt, about 10 kilometers in diameter. It was discovered on 21 March 1993, by the Uppsala-ESO Survey of Asteroids and Comets (UESAC) at ESO's La Silla Observatory site in northern Chile.

== Classification and orbit ==
The dark C-type asteroid is a member of the Themis family, a dynamical family of outer-belt asteroids with nearly coplanar ecliptical orbits. It orbits the Sun in the outer main-belt at a distance of 2.8–3.4 AU once every 5 years and 5 months (1,987 days). Its orbit has an eccentricity of 0.11 and an inclination of 1° with respect to the ecliptic. It was first identified as 1933 FU at Heidelberg in 1933, extending the body's observation arc by 60 years prior to its official discovery observation at La Silla.

== Physical characteristics ==
=== Lightcurves ===
In 2014, two rotational lightcurves of this asteroid were obtained from photometric observations in the R-band at the U.S. Palomar Transient Factory in California. Lightcurve analysis gave a rotation period of 3.4735 and 3.470 hours with a brightness variation of 0.10 and 0.13 in magnitude, respectively (U=2/2).

=== Diameter and albedo ===
The Collaborative Asteroid Lightcurve Link (CALL) assumes a low albedo of 0.08 for the asteroid's surface and calculates a diameter of 9.9 kilometers, based on an absolute magnitude of 13.38.

== Naming ==
As of 2017, the asteroid has not been named.
