= UESAC =

Astronomical survey

Uppsala–ESO Survey of Asteroids and Comets
- Alternative names: Uppsala-ESO Survey of Asteroids and Comets

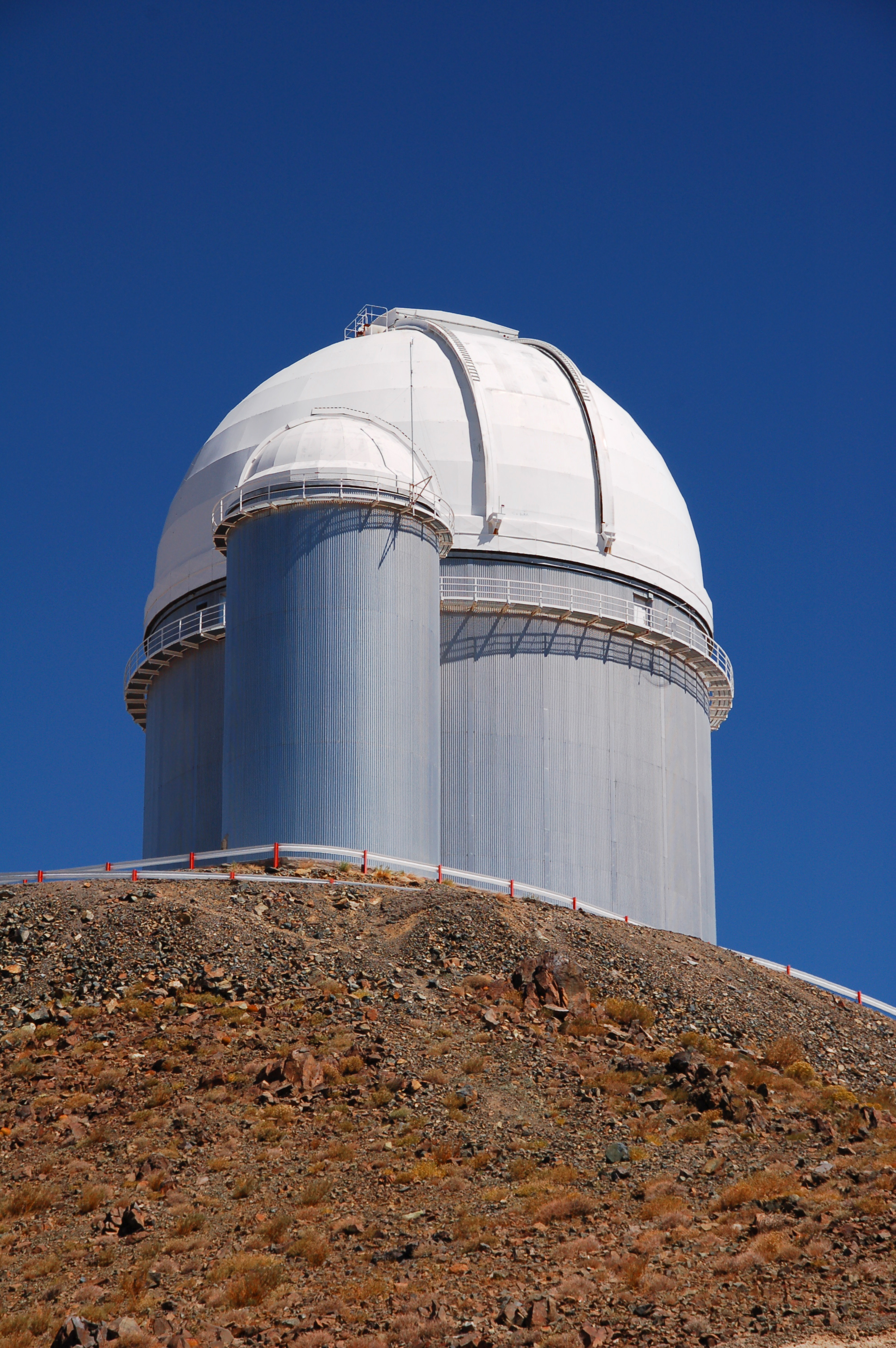
The 3.6-metre telescope at ESO's La Silla observatory.

Minor planets discovered: 1123
see § List of discovered minor planets

The Uppsala–ESO Survey of Asteroids and Comets (UESAC) took place in 1992–1993. A large number of asteroids were investigated. Over 15,000 positions were detected, and orbits were calculated for 2500.

The observations were taken at ESO's La Silla Observatory site in Chile, with a total of 74 obtained photographic plates, and at the Anglo-Australian Observatory (Siding Spring Observatory) in Australia. Details were published in 1996.

== List of discovered minor planets ==
The Minor Planet Center credits UESAC with the discovery of 1123 numbered minor planets. The discoveries range from the lowest numbered discovery, 6102 Visby, to the currently highest numbered body, (437697) 2014 DQ_{32}. The given total also including (376220) 2011 EG_{13} and (376537) 2012 TW_{9}, which were separately credited to "Comets UESAC", while all other discoveries were credited to "UESAC". More minor planets may yet to be numbered and added to this list as their orbits are confirmed.

6102 Visby	21 March 1993	list
6252 Montevideo	6 March 1992	list
6273 Kiruna	1 March 1992	list
6528 Boden	21 March 1993	list
6654 Lulea	29 February 1992	list
6666 Fro	19 March 1993	list
6739 Tarendo	19 March 1993	list
6795 Ornskoldsvik	17 March 1993	list
6796 Sundsvall	21 March 1993	list
6797 Ostersund	21 March 1993	list
7248 Alvsjo	1 March 1992	list
7292 Prosperin	1 March 1992	list
(7348) 1993 FJ22	21 March 1993	list
(7431) 1993 FN_{41}	19 March 1993	list
(7473) 1992 EC_{4}	1 March 1992	list
7528 Huskvarna	19 March 1993	list
7595 Vaxjo	21 March 1993	list
7704 Dellen	1 March 1992	list
7705 Humeln	17 March 1993	list
7706 Mien	19 March 1993	list
7770 Siljan	2 March 1992	list
7771 Tvaren	2 March 1992	list
(7772) 1992 EQ_{15}	1 March 1992	list
(7832) 1993 FA_{27}	21 March 1993	list
7833 Nilstamm	19 March 1993	list
(7879) 1992 EX_{17}	3 March 1992	list
(7882) 1993 FL_{6}	17 March 1993	list
(8092) 1992 DC_{10}	29 February 1992	list
(8178) 1992 DQ_{10}	29 February 1992	list
(8179) 1992 EA_{7}	1 March 1992	list
(8287) 1992 EJ_{4}	1 March 1992	list
(8288) 1992 ED_{17}	1 March 1992	list
(8388) 1993 FO_{6}	17 March 1993	list
(8389) 1993 FT_{37}	19 March 1993	list
(8390) 1993 FE_{48}	19 March 1993	list
(8518) 1992 DM_{6}	29 February 1992	list
(8519) 1992 DB_{10}	29 February 1992	list
(8520) 1992 EC_{12}	6 March 1992	list
8540 Ardeberg	17 March 1993	list
8677 Charlier	2 March 1992	list
8678 Bal	1 March 1992	list
8679 Tingstade	2 March 1992	list
8680 Rone	2 March 1992	list
8681 Burs	2 March 1992	list
8682 Kraklingbo	2 March 1992	list
8683 Sjolander	2 March 1992	list
8695 Bergvall	17 March 1993	list
8696 Kjeriksson	17 March 1993	list
8697 Olofsson	21 March 1993	list
8698 Bertilpettersson	19 March 1993	list

(8699) 1993 FO_{48}	19 March 1993	list
8868 Hjorter	1 March 1992	list
8869 Olausgutho	6 March 1992	list
8870 von Zeipel	6 March 1992	list
8871 Svanberg	1 March 1992	list
(8878) 1993 FN_{16}	17 March 1993	list
(8879) 1993 FN_{20}	19 March 1993	list
(8880) 1993 FT_{33}	19 March 1993	list
8881 Prialnik	19 March 1993	list
9055 Edvardsson	29 February 1992	list
9056 Piskunov	1 March 1992	list
(9066) 1993 FR34	19 March 1993	list
(9200) 1993 FK_{21}	21 March 1993	list
(9201) 1993 FU_{39}	19 March 1993	list
9358 Faro	29 February 1992	list
9359 Fleringe	6 March 1992	list
(9360) 1992 EV_{13}	2 March 1992	list
(9361) 1992 EM_{18}	3 March 1992	list
(9370) 1993 FC_{22}	21 March 1993	list
(9371) 1993 FV_{31}	19 March 1993	list
9372 Vamlingbo	19 March 1993	list
9373 Hamra	19 March 1993	list
9374 Sundre	19 March 1993	list
(9607) 1992 DS_{6}	29 February 1992	list
9617 Grahamchapman	17 March 1993	list
9618 Johncleese	17 March 1993	list
9619 Terrygilliam	17 March 1993	list
9620 Ericidle	17 March 1993	list
9621 Michaelpalin	21 March 1993	list
9622 Terryjones	21 March 1993	list
9623 Karlsson	21 March 1993	list
(9624) 1993 FH_{38}	19 March 1993	list
(9771) 1993 FU_{17}	17 March 1993	list
(9874) 1993 FG_{23}	21 March 1993	list
(9875) 1993 FH_{25}	21 March 1993	list
(9876) 1993 FY_{37}	19 March 1993	list
(9966) 1992 ES13	2 March 1992	list
10102 Digerhuvud	29 February 1992	list
10103 Jungfrun	29 February 1992	list
10104 Hoburgsgubben	2 March 1992	list
10105 Holmhallar	6 March 1992	list
10106 Lergrav	1 March 1992	list
10123 Fideoja	17 March 1993	list
10124 Hemse	21 March 1993	list
10125 Stenkyrka	21 March 1993	list
10126 Larbro	21 March 1993	list
10127 Frojel	21 March 1993	list
10128 Bro	19 March 1993	list
10129 Fole	19 March 1993	list
10130 Ardre	19 March 1993	list

10131 Stanga	21 March 1993	list
10132 Lummelunda	20 March 1993	list
(10345) 1992 DC_{11}	29 February 1992	list
10544 Horsnebara	29 February 1992	list
10545 Kallunge	2 March 1992	list
10553 Stenkumla	17 March 1993	list
10554 Vasterhejde	19 March 1993	list
10794 Vange	29 February 1992	list
10795 Babben	1 March 1992	list
10796 Sollerman	2 March 1992	list
10807 Uggarde	17 March 1993	list
10808 Digerrojr	17 March 1993	list
10809 Majsterrojr	17 March 1993	list
10810 Lejsturojr	17 March 1993	list
10811 Lau	17 March 1993	list
10812 Grotlingbo	21 March 1993	list
10813 Masterby	19 March 1993	list
10814 Gnisvard	19 March 1993	list
10815 Ostergarn	19 March 1993	list
(10816) 1993 FZ_{35}	19 March 1993	list
(10817) 1993 FR_{44}	21 March 1993	list
(10818) 1993 FK_{81}	18 March 1993	list
11069 Bellqvist	1 March 1992	list
(11070) 1992 EV_{9}	2 March 1992	list
(11071) 1992 EU_{14}	1 March 1992	list
11081 Persave	21 March 1993	list
11295 Gustaflarsson	8 March 1992	list
11305 Ahlqvist	17 March 1993	list
11306 Akesson	17 March 1993	list
11307 Erikolsson	19 March 1993	list
11308 Tofta	21 March 1993	list
(11531) 1992 DL_{7}	29 February 1992	list
11532 Gullin	1 March 1992	list
11533 Akeback	1 March 1992	list
(11534) 1992 EB_{16}	1 March 1992	list
(11535) 1992 EQ_{27}	4 March 1992	list
(11557) 1993 FO_{8}	17 March 1993	list
(11558) 1993 FY_{8}	17 March 1993	list
(11559) 1993 FS_{23}	21 March 1993	list
(11560) 1993 FU_{24}	21 March 1993	list
(11561) 1993 FZ_{24}	21 March 1993	list
(11562) 1993 FU_{33}	19 March 1993	list
(11563) 1993 FO_{36}	19 March 1993	list
(11564) 1993 FU_{41}	19 March 1993	list
(11565) 1993 FD_{51}	19 March 1993	list
(11566) 1993 FU_{51}	17 March 1993	list
(11567) 1993 FF_{82}	19 March 1993	list
11907 Naranen	2 March 1992	list
11934 Lundgren	17 March 1993	list
11935 Olakarlsson	17 March 1993	list

11936 Tremolizzo	17 March 1993	list
(11937) 1993 FF_{16}	17 March 1993	list
(11938) 1993 FZ_{26}	21 March 1993	list
(11939) 1993 FH_{36}	19 March 1993	list
12311 Ingemyr	1 March 1992	list
12312 Vate	2 March 1992	list
(12313) 1992 EX_{10}	6 March 1992	list
(12314) 1992 EE_{14}	2 March 1992	list
(12345) 1993 FT_{8}	17 March 1993	list
(12346) 1993 FK_{25}	21 March 1993	list
(12347) 1993 FW_{37}	19 March 1993	list
(12348) 1993 FX_{40}	19 March 1993	list
(12739) 1992 DY_{7}	29 February 1992	list
(12740) 1992 EX_{8}	2 March 1992	list
(12741) 1992 EU_{30}	1 March 1992	list
12752 Kvarnis	19 March 1993	list
(13080) 1992 EZ_{7}	2 March 1992	list
(13081) 1992 EW_{9}	2 March 1992	list
13082 Gutierrez	6 March 1992	list
(13083) 1992 EE_{32}	2 March 1992	list
(13098) 1993 FM_{6}	17 March 1993	list
(13099) 1993 FO_{7}	17 March 1993	list
(13100) 1993 FB_{10}	17 March 1993	list
13101 Fransson	19 March 1993	list
(13102) 1993 FU_{11}	17 March 1993	list
(13103) 1993 FR_{12}	17 March 1993	list
(13104) 1993 FV_{24}	21 March 1993	list
(13105) 1993 FO_{27}	21 March 1993	list
(13106) 1993 FV_{48}	19 March 1993	list
(13107) 1993 FE_{59}	19 March 1993	list
(13108) 1993 FD_{82}	19 March 1993	list
(13544) 1992 DU_{5}	29 February 1992	list
(13545) 1992 DZ_{5}	29 February 1992	list
(13546) 1992 DF_{8}	29 February 1992	list
(13547) 1992 DJ_{8}	29 February 1992	list
(13549) 1992 EW_{7}	2 March 1992	list
(13550) 1992 EX_{9}	2 March 1992	list
(13570) 1993 FH_{7}	17 March 1993	list
(13571) 1993 FT_{7}	17 March 1993	list
(13572) 1993 FS_{12}	17 March 1993	list
(13573) 1993 FZ_{18}	17 March 1993	list
(13574) 1993 FX_{79}	21 March 1993	list
(13976) 1992 EZ_{6}	1 March 1992	list
13991 Kenphillips	17 March 1993	list
13992 Cesarebarbieri	17 March 1993	list
13993 Clemenssimmer	17 March 1993	list
13994 Tuominen	17 March 1993	list
13995 Toravere	19 March 1993	list
(13996) 1993 FH_{20}	19 March 1993	list
(13997) 1993 FB_{32}	19 March 1993	list

(13998) 1993 FL_{39}	19 March 1993	list
(13999) 1993 FH_{43}	19 March 1993	list
(14000) 1993 FZ_{55}	17 March 1993	list
(14431) 1992 DX_{8}	29 February 1992	list
(14432) 1992 EA_{6}	2 March 1992	list
(14433) 1992 EE_{8}	2 March 1992	list
(14434) 1992 ER_{11}	6 March 1992	list
(14435) 1992 ED_{13}	2 March 1992	list
(14453) 1993 FV_{7}	17 March 1993	list
(14454) 1993 FX_{17}	17 March 1993	list
(14455) 1993 FB_{18}	17 March 1993	list
(14456) 1993 FK_{20}	19 March 1993	list
(14457) 1993 FR_{23}	21 March 1993	list
(14458) 1993 FX_{25}	21 March 1993	list
(14459) 1993 FY_{27}	21 March 1993	list
(14460) 1993 FZ_{40}	19 March 1993	list
(14461) 1993 FL_{54}	17 March 1993	list
(14893) 1992 DN_{6}	29 February 1992	list
(14894) 1992 EA_{8}	2 March 1992	list
(14895) 1992 EJ_{24}	2 March 1992	list
(14896) 1992 EB_{26}	8 March 1992	list
(14904) 1993 FM_{14}	17 March 1993	list
(14905) 1993 FV_{27}	21 March 1993	list
(15298) 1992 EB_{13}	2 March 1992	list
(15299) 1992 ER_{17}	1 March 1992	list
(15308) 1993 FR_{4}	17 March 1993	list
(15309) 1993 FZ_{7}	17 March 1993	list
(15310) 1993 FT_{19}	17 March 1993	list
(15311) 1993 FZ_{22}	21 March 1993	list
(15312) 1993 FH_{27}	21 March 1993	list
(15313) 1993 FM_{28}	21 March 1993	list
(15314) 1993 FL_{34}	17 March 1993	list
(15315) 1993 FX_{35}	19 March 1993	list
(15753) 1992 DD_{10}	29 February 1992	list
(15755) 1992 ET_{5}	2 March 1992	list
(15756) 1992 ET_{9}	2 March 1992	list
(15757) 1992 EJ_{13}	2 March 1992	list
(15767) 1993 FN_{7}	17 March 1993	list
(15768) 1993 FW_{11}	17 March 1993	list
(15769) 1993 FP_{23}	21 March 1993	list
(15770) 1993 FL_{29}	21 March 1993	list
(15771) 1993 FS_{34}	19 March 1993	list
(15772) 1993 FW_{34}	19 March 1993	list
(15773) 1993 FO_{37}	19 March 1993	list
(15774) 1993 FK_{38}	19 March 1993	list
(15775) 1993 FA_{49}	19 March 1993	list
(16568) 1992 DX_{5}	29 February 1992	list
(16569) 1992 DA_{10}	29 February 1992	list
(16570) 1992 DE_{11}	29 February 1992	list
(16572) 1992 EU_{5}	2 March 1992	list

(16573) 1992 EC_{10}	2 March 1992	list
(16574) 1992 EU_{10}	6 March 1992	list
(16575) 1992 EH_{11}	6 March 1992	list
(16576) 1992 EY_{11}	6 March 1992	list
(16577) 1992 ET_{23}	2 March 1992	list
(16603) 1993 FG_{6}	17 March 1993	list
(16604) 1993 FQ_{10}	17 March 1993	list
(16605) 1993 FR_{10}	17 March 1993	list
(16606) 1993 FH_{11}	17 March 1993	list
(16607) 1993 FN_{12}	17 March 1993	list
(16608) 1993 FA_{23}	21 March 1993	list
(16609) 1993 FB_{23}	21 March 1993	list
(16610) 1993 FV_{23}	21 March 1993	list
(16611) 1993 FY_{23}	21 March 1993	list
(16612) 1993 FF_{25}	21 March 1993	list
(16613) 1993 FD_{28}	21 March 1993	list
(16614) 1993 FS_{35}	19 March 1993	list
(16615) 1993 FW_{40}	19 March 1993	list
(16616) 1993 FB_{44}	19 March 1993	list
(16617) 1993 FC_{48}	19 March 1993	list
(16618) 1993 FX_{52}	17 March 1993	list
(16619) 1993 FR_{58}	19 March 1993	list
(16620) 1993 FE_{78}	21 March 1993	list
(16621) 1993 FA_{84}	23 March 1993	list
(17497) 1992 DO_{6}	29 February 1992	list
(17498) 1992 EP_{4}	1 March 1992	list
(17499) 1992 EJ_{5}	1 March 1992	list
(17500) 1992 EQ_{10}	6 March 1992	list
(17524) 1993 FS_{4}	17 March 1993	list
(17525) 1993 FH_{5}	17 March 1993	list
(17526) 1993 FV_{5}	17 March 1993	list
(17527) 1993 FC_{14}	17 March 1993	list
(17528) 1993 FX_{14}	17 March 1993	list
(17529) 1993 FJ_{23}	21 March 1993	list
(17530) 1993 FZ_{23}	21 March 1993	list
(17531) 1993 FU_{25}	21 March 1993	list
(17532) 1993 FD_{34}	19 March 1993	list
(17533) 1993 FR_{36}	19 March 1993	list
(17534) 1993 FB_{40}	19 March 1993	list
(17535) 1993 FF_{40}	19 March 1993	list
(17536) 1993 FM_{40}	19 March 1993	list
(17537) 1993 FN_{40}	19 March 1993	list
(17538) 1993 FZ_{44}	19 March 1993	list
(17539) 1993 FR_{46}	19 March 1993	list
(17540) 1993 FX_{81}	18 March 1993	list
(18382) 1992 EG_{22}	1 March 1992	list
(18383) 1992 ER_{28}	8 March 1992	list
(18384) 1992 ES_{28}	8 March 1992	list
(18385) 1992 EG_{31}	1 March 1992	list
(18386) 1992 EL_{35}	2 March 1992	list

(18405) 1993 FY_{12}	17 March 1993	list
(18406) 1993 FT_{14}	17 March 1993	list
(18407) 1993 FQ_{24}	21 March 1993	list
(18408) 1993 FP_{30}	21 March 1993	list
(18409) 1993 FF_{36}	19 March 1993	list
(18410) 1993 FC_{51}	19 March 1993	list
(18411) 1993 FB_{82}	19 March 1993	list
(19192) 1992 DY_{5}	29 February 1992	list
(19193) 1992 DK_{6}	29 February 1992	list
(19194) 1992 DG_{7}	29 February 1992	list
(19195) 1992 DM_{7}	29 February 1992	list
(19196) 1992 DQ_{7}	29 February 1992	list
(19198) 1992 ED_{8}	2 March 1992	list
(19212) 1993 FL_{18}	17 March 1993	list
(19213) 1993 FF_{21}	21 March 1993	list
(19214) 1993 FT_{22}	21 March 1993	list
(19215) 1993 FS_{29}	21 March 1993	list
(19216) 1993 FA_{37}	19 March 1993	list
(19217) 1993 FE_{43}	19 March 1993	list
(19218) 1993 FH_{49}	19 March 1993	list
(20025) 1992 DU_{7}	29 February 1992	list
(20026) 1992 EP11	6 March 1992	list
(20027) 1992 EY_{14}	1 March 1992	list
(20028) 1992 EZ_{21}	1 March 1992	list
(20029) 1992 EB_{24}	2 March 1992	list
(20030) 1992 EN_{30}	1 March 1992	list
(20045) 1993 FV_{11}	17 March 1993	list
(20046) 1993 FE_{15}	17 March 1993	list
(20047) 1993 FD_{18}	17 March 1993	list
(20048) 1993 FF_{19}	17 March 1993	list
(20049) 1993 FZ_{20}	21 March 1993	list
(20050) 1993 FO_{21}	21 March 1993	list
(20051) 1993 FE_{26}	21 March 1993	list
(20052) 1993 FS_{27}	21 March 1993	list
(20053) 1993 FK_{29}	21 March 1993	list
(20054) 1993 FX_{37}	19 March 1993	list
(20055) 1993 FB_{47}	19 March 1993	list
(20056) 1993 FU_{64}	21 March 1993	list
(21090) 1992 DZ_{6}	29 February 1992	list
(21091) 1992 DK_{8}	29 February 1992	list
(21092) 1992 EJ_{6}	1 March 1992	list
(21093) 1992 EK_{6}	1 March 1992	list
(21094) 1992 EP_{7}	1 March 1992	list
(21095) 1992 EG_{11}	6 March 1992	list
(21096) 1992 EZ_{11}	6 March 1992	list
(21097) 1992 ER_{25}	8 March 1992	list
(21098) 1992 EB_{27}	2 March 1992	list
(21131) 1993 FQ_{7}	17 March 1993	list
(21132) 1993 FN_{10}	17 March 1993	list
(21133) 1993 FE_{11}	17 March 1993	list

(21134) 1993 FE_{13}	17 March 1993	list
(21135) 1993 FL_{14}	17 March 1993	list
(21136) 1993 FH_{19}	17 March 1993	list
(21137) 1993 FX_{20}	21 March 1993	list
(21138) 1993 FS_{24}	21 March 1993	list
(21139) 1993 FP_{26}	21 March 1993	list
(21140) 1993 FN_{28}	21 March 1993	list
(21141) 1993 FD_{30}	21 March 1993	list
(21142) 1993 FV_{30}	19 March 1993	list
(21143) 1993 FX_{31}	19 March 1993	list
(21144) 1993 FA_{46}	19 March 1993	list
(21145) 1993 FZ_{57}	19 March 1993	list
(21146) 1993 FD_{67}	21 March 1993	list
(21147) 1993 FV_{80}	18 March 1993	list
(22332) 1992 DD_{8}	29 February 1992	list
(22333) 1992 DG_{10}	29 February 1992	list
(22334) 1992 ES_{6}	1 March 1992	list
(22335) 1992 ED_{18}	3 March 1992	list
(22336) 1992 EA_{19}	1 March 1992	list
(22337) 1992 EV_{32}	2 March 1992	list
(22358) 1993 FK_{11}	17 March 1993	list
(22359) 1993 FR_{11}	17 March 1993	list
(22360) 1993 FT_{11}	17 March 1993	list
(22361) 1993 FN_{14}	17 March 1993	list
(22362) 1993 FY_{19}	17 March 1993	list
(22363) 1993 FX_{21}	21 March 1993	list
(22364) 1993 FJ_{33}	19 March 1993	list
(22365) 1993 FQ_{43}	19 March 1993	list
(23505) 1992 EB_{4}	1 March 1992	list
(23506) 1992 EC_{8}	2 March 1992	list
(23507) 1992 EQ_{13}	2 March 1992	list
(23508) 1992 ET_{14}	1 March 1992	list
(23525) 1993 FS_{22}	21 March 1993	list
(23526) 1993 FJ_{32}	21 March 1993	list
(23527) 1993 FD_{37}	19 March 1993	list
(23528) 1993 FQ_{38}	19 March 1993	list
(23529) 1993 FR_{45}	19 March 1993	list
(23530) 1993 FV_{45}	19 March 1993	list
(23531) 1993 FN_{62}	19 March 1993	list
(24733) 1992 DM_{9}	29 February 1992	list
(24735) 1992 EU_{6}	1 March 1992	list
(24736) 1992 EV_{8}	2 March 1992	list
(24737) 1992 ED_{14}	2 March 1992	list
(24738) 1992 EK_{14}	2 March 1992	list
(24739) 1992 EB_{15}	1 March 1992	list
(24740) 1992 EW_{16}	1 March 1992	list
(24741) 1992 EW_{17}	3 March 1992	list
(24765) 1993 FE_{8}	17 March 1993	list
(24766) 1993 FW_{9}	17 March 1993	list
(24767) 1993 FE_{12}	17 March 1993	list

(24768) 1993 FC_{13}	17 March 1993	list
(24769) 1993 FN_{24}	21 March 1993	list
(24770) 1993 FG_{28}	21 March 1993	list
(24771) 1993 FA_{32}	19 March 1993	list
(24772) 1993 FL_{33}	19 March 1993	list
(24773) 1993 FQ_{35}	19 March 1993	list
(24774) 1993 FE_{38}	19 March 1993	list
(24775) 1993 FT_{42}	19 March 1993	list
(24776) 1993 FR_{43}	19 March 1993	list
(26130) 1993 FQ_{11}	17 March 1993	list
(26131) 1993 FE_{20}	17 March 1993	list
(26132) 1993 FF_{24}	21 March 1993	list
(26133) 1993 FS_{26}	21 March 1993	list
(26134) 1993 FY_{34}	19 March 1993	list
(26848) 1992 DB_{8}	29 February 1992	list
(26859) 1993 FM_{8}	17 March 1993	list
(26860) 1993 FX_{16}	19 March 1993	list
(26861) 1993 FO_{20}	19 March 1993	list
(26862) 1993 FE_{22}	21 March 1993	list
(26863) 1993 FO_{22}	21 March 1993	list
(26864) 1993 FT_{24}	21 March 1993	list
(26865) 1993 FX_{29}	21 March 1993	list
(26866) 1993 FW_{41}	19 March 1993	list
(27778) 1992 DF_{6}	29 February 1992	list
(27779) 1992 DY_{8}	29 February 1992	list
(27780) 1992 ER_{18}	1 March 1992	list
(27781) 1992 EE_{19}	1 March 1992	list
(27782) 1992 EH_{24}	2 March 1992	list
(27794) 1993 FY_{5}	17 March 1993	list
(27795) 1993 FO_{12}	17 March 1993	list
(27796) 1993 FK_{13}	17 March 1993	list
(27797) 1993 FQ_{17}	17 March 1993	list
(27798) 1993 FJ_{19}	17 March 1993	list
(27799) 1993 FQ_{23}	21 March 1993	list
(27800) 1993 FA_{28}	21 March 1993	list
(27801) 1993 FS_{28}	21 March 1993	list
(27802) 1993 FY_{30}	19 March 1993	list
(27803) 1993 FU_{35}	19 March 1993	list
(27804) 1993 FP_{38}	19 March 1993	list
(27805) 1993 FJ_{40}	19 March 1993	list
(27806) 1993 FS_{46}	19 March 1993	list
(27807) 1993 FF_{49}	19 March 1993	list
(27808) 1993 FT_{56}	17 March 1993	list
(29224) 1992 DD_{7}	29 February 1992	list
(29225) 1992 DW_{7}	29 February 1992	list
(29226) 1992 DH_{8}	29 February 1992	list
(29230) 1992 ED_{4}	1 March 1992	list
(29231) 1992 EG_{4}	1 March 1992	list
(29232) 1992 EH_{4}	1 March 1992	list
(29233) 1992 EP_{6}	1 March 1992	list

(29234) 1992 EC_{7}	1 March 1992	list
(29235) 1992 EU_{13}	2 March 1992	list
(29236) 1992 EB_{14}	2 March 1992	list
(29237) 1992 EG_{14}	2 March 1992	list
(29238) 1992 EE_{17}	1 March 1992	list
(29239) 1992 EJ_{17}	2 March 1992	list
(29255) 1993 FF_{4}	17 March 1993	list
(29256) 1993 FC_{7}	17 March 1993	list
(29257) 1993 FK_{10}	17 March 1993	list
(29258) 1993 FX_{11}	17 March 1993	list
(29259) 1993 FZ_{11}	17 March 1993	list
(29260) 1993 FG_{12}	17 March 1993	list
(29261) 1993 FS_{13}	17 March 1993	list
(29262) 1993 FP_{14}	17 March 1993	list
(29263) 1993 FY_{14}	17 March 1993	list
(29264) 1993 FR_{17}	17 March 1993	list
(29265) 1993 FV_{18}	17 March 1993	list
(29266) 1993 FA_{20}	17 March 1993	list
(29267) 1993 FD_{22}	21 March 1993	list
(29268) 1993 FY_{22}	21 March 1993	list
(29269) 1993 FD_{25}	21 March 1993	list
(29270) 1993 FF_{28}	21 March 1993	list
(29271) 1993 FF_{31}	19 March 1993	list
(29272) 1993 FO_{31}	19 March 1993	list
(29273) 1993 FO_{32}	21 March 1993	list
(29274) 1993 FK_{33}	19 March 1993	list
(29275) 1993 FM_{33}	19 March 1993	list
(29276) 1993 FO_{33}	19 March 1993	list
(29277) 1993 FB_{34}	19 March 1993	list
(29278) 1993 FN_{34}	17 March 1993	list
(29279) 1993 FC_{35}	19 March 1993	list
(29280) 1993 FD_{36}	19 March 1993	list
(29281) 1993 FJ_{38}	19 March 1993	list
(29282) 1993 FM_{39}	19 March 1993	list
(29283) 1993 FD_{40}	19 March 1993	list
(29284) 1993 FL_{41}	19 March 1993	list
(29285) 1993 FD_{42}	19 March 1993	list
(29286) 1993 FA_{45}	19 March 1993	list
(29287) 1993 FD_{49}	19 March 1993	list
(29288) 1993 FJ_{51}	19 March 1993	list
(29289) 1993 FM_{62}	19 March 1993	list
(29290) 1993 FF_{84}	24 March 1993	list
(30861) 1992 DS_{5}	29 February 1992	list
(30862) 1992 DF_{10}	29 February 1992	list
(30863) 1992 EA_{4}	1 March 1992	list
(30864) 1992 EE_{6}	1 March 1992	list
(30865) 1992 EH_{8}	2 March 1992	list
(30866) 1992 EN_{8}	2 March 1992	list
(30867) 1992 EL_{9}	2 March 1992	list
(30868) 1992 ET_{10}	6 March 1992	list

(30869) 1992 EU_{11}	6 March 1992	list
(30870) 1992 EW_{15}	1 March 1992	list
(30871) 1992 EG_{16}	1 March 1992	list
(30872) 1992 EM_{17}	2 March 1992	list
(30873) 1992 EN_{17}	2 March 1992	list
(30874) 1992 EA_{23}	1 March 1992	list
(30875) 1992 EX_{25}	8 March 1992	list
(30876) 1992 EM_{27}	4 March 1992	list
(30877) 1992 ES_{30}	1 March 1992	list
(30889) 1993 FU_{6}	17 March 1993	list
(30890) 1993 FB_{9}	17 March 1993	list
(30891) 1993 FV_{14}	17 March 1993	list
(30892) 1993 FR_{18}	17 March 1993	list
(30893) 1993 FD_{19}	17 March 1993	list
(30894) 1993 FD_{20}	17 March 1993	list
(30895) 1993 FH_{23}	21 March 1993	list
(30896) 1993 FX_{26}	21 March 1993	list
(30897) 1993 FG_{29}	21 March 1993	list
(30898) 1993 FJ_{29}	21 March 1993	list
(30899) 1993 FL_{32}	21 March 1993	list
(30900) 1993 FM_{34}	17 March 1993	list
(30901) 1993 FU_{34}	19 March 1993	list
(30902) 1993 FF_{35}	19 March 1993	list
(30903) 1993 FU_{37}	19 March 1993	list
(30904) 1993 FV_{41}	19 March 1993	list
(30905) 1993 FC_{42}	19 March 1993	list
(30906) 1993 FV_{44}	19 March 1993	list
(30907) 1993 FD_{47}	19 March 1993	list
(30908) 1993 FW_{47}	19 March 1993	list
(30909) 1993 FZ_{49}	19 March 1993	list
(30910) 1993 FP_{52}	17 March 1993	list
(30911) 1993 FY_{75}	21 March 1993	list
(30912) 1993 FP_{76}	21 March 1993	list
(30913) 1993 FO_{77}	21 March 1993	list
(30914) 1993 FV_{82}	19 March 1993	list
(32828) 1992 DM_{8}	29 February 1992	list
(32829) 1992 DT_{10}	29 February 1992	list
(32830) 1992 DL_{11}	29 February 1992	list
(32834) 1992 EO_{4}	1 March 1992	list
(32835) 1992 EO_{5}	1 March 1992	list
(32836) 1992 EC_{6}	2 March 1992	list
(32837) 1992 EK_{7}	1 March 1992	list
(32838) 1992 EL_{8}	2 March 1992	list
(32839) 1992 EY_{8}	2 March 1992	list
(32840) 1992 ED_{9}	2 March 1992	list
(32841) 1992 EO_{9}	2 March 1992	list
(32842) 1992 EO_{13}	2 March 1992	list
(32843) 1992 EC_{18}	3 March 1992	list
(32844) 1992 EN_{25}	8 March 1992	list
(32860) 1993 FG_{5}	17 March 1993	list

(32861) 1993 FM_{7}	17 March 1993	list
(32862) 1993 FD_{10}	17 March 1993	list
(32863) 1993 FP_{11}	17 March 1993	list
(32864) 1993 FW_{15}	17 March 1993	list
(32865) 1993 FQ_{16}	17 March 1993	list
(32866) 1993 FW_{16}	19 March 1993	list
(32867) 1993 FL_{20}	19 March 1993	list
(32868) 1993 FM_{25}	21 March 1993	list
(32869) 1993 FW_{26}	21 March 1993	list
(32870) 1993 FD_{27}	21 March 1993	list
(32871) 1993 FQ_{32}	21 March 1993	list
(32872) 1993 FM_{36}	19 March 1993	list
(32873) 1993 FS_{37}	19 March 1993	list
(32874) 1993 FJ_{48}	19 March 1993	list
(32875) 1993 FQ_{58}	19 March 1993	list
(32876) 1993 FW_{60}	19 March 1993	list
(32877) 1993 FU_{73}	21 March 1993	list
(35114) 1992 DC_{7}	29 February 1992	list
(35115) 1992 DN_{8}	29 February 1992	list
(35116) 1992 DV_{8}	29 February 1992	list
(35117) 1992 DN_{9}	29 February 1992	list
(35118) 1992 EV_{5}	2 March 1992	list
(35119) 1992 EY_{6}	1 March 1992	list
(35120) 1992 EN_{7}	1 March 1992	list
(35121) 1992 EP_{8}	2 March 1992	list
(35122) 1992 ET_{15}	1 March 1992	list
(35123) 1992 EB_{17}	1 March 1992	list
(35124) 1992 EU_{21}	1 March 1992	list
(35125) 1992 ED_{22}	1 March 1992	list
(35126) 1992 EM_{25}	6 March 1992	list
(35127) 1992 EQ_{26}	2 March 1992	list
(35128) 1992 EG_{27}	2 March 1992	list
(35129) 1992 EZ_{29}	3 March 1992	list
(35146) 1993 FC_{9}	17 March 1993	list
(35147) 1993 FD_{9}	17 March 1993	list
(35148) 1993 FX_{15}	17 March 1993	list
(35149) 1993 FG_{33}	19 March 1993	list
(35150) 1993 FR_{41}	19 March 1993	list
(35151) 1993 FQ_{50}	19 March 1993	list
(35152) 1993 FG_{51}	19 March 1993	list
(35153) 1993 FU_{52}	17 March 1993	list
(35154) 1993 FF_{53}	17 March 1993	list
(35155) 1993 FU_{58}	19 March 1993	list
(35156) 1993 FH_{59}	19 March 1993	list
(35157) 1993 FQ_{73}	21 March 1993	list
(35158) 1993 FL_{82}	19 March 1993	list
(37597) 1992 EH_{10}	2 March 1992	list
(37598) 1992 EL_{17}	2 March 1992	list
(37599) 1992 EH_{18}	3 March 1992	list
(37600) 1992 EO_{20}	2 March 1992	list

(37610) 1993 FP_{7}	17 March 1993	list
(37611) 1993 FR_{29}	21 March 1993	list
(37612) 1993 FJ_{37}	19 March 1993	list
(37613) 1993 FE_{40}	19 March 1993	list
(37614) 1993 FT_{47}	19 March 1993	list
(37615) 1993 FX_{50}	19 March 1993	list
(37616) 1993 FK_{82}	19 March 1993	list
(39546) 1992 DT5	29 February 1992	list
(39547) 1992 DE_{7}	29 February 1992	list
(39548) 1992 DA_{8}	29 February 1992	list
(39550) 1992 ES_{4}	1 March 1992	list
(39551) 1992 EW_{5}	2 March 1992	list
(39552) 1992 EY_{7}	2 March 1992	list
(39553) 1992 EO_{12}	6 March 1992	list
(39554) 1992 EW_{19}	1 March 1992	list
(39555) 1992 EY_{32}	2 March 1992	list
(39573) 1993 FO_{4}	17 March 1993	list
(39574) 1993 FM_{5}	17 March 1993	list
(39575) 1993 FR_{5}	17 March 1993	list
(39576) 1993 FO_{11}	17 March 1993	list
(39577) 1993 FV_{12}	17 March 1993	list
(39578) 1993 FV_{13}	17 March 1993	list
(39579) 1993 FD_{16}	17 March 1993	list
(39580) 1993 FF_{20}	17 March 1993	list
(39581) 1993 FQ_{21}	21 March 1993	list
(39582) 1993 FR_{21}	21 March 1993	list
(39583) 1993 FN_{23}	21 March 1993	list
(39584) 1993 FO_{23}	21 March 1993	list
(39585) 1993 FJ_{26}	21 March 1993	list
(39586) 1993 FW_{27}	21 March 1993	list
(39587) 1993 FF_{30}	21 March 1993	list
(39588) 1993 FZ_{37}	19 March 1993	list
(39589) 1993 FL_{75}	21 March 1993	list
(39590) 1993 FG_{76}	21 March 1993	list
(42498) 1992 DG_{6}	29 February 1992	list
(42503) 1993 FU_{4}	17 March 1993	list
(42504) 1993 FC_{8}	17 March 1993	list
(42505) 1993 FC_{20}	17 March 1993	list
(42506) 1993 FA_{21}	21 March 1993	list
(42507) 1993 FJ_{25}	21 March 1993	list
(42508) 1993 FR_{30}	21 March 1993	list
(42509) 1993 FV_{33}	19 March 1993	list
(42510) 1993 FX_{55}	17 March 1993	list
(42511) 1993 FD_{77}	21 March 1993	list
(42512) 1993 FW_{81}	18 March 1993	list
(43817) 1992 EF_{22}	1 March 1992	list
(43818) 1992 ET_{32}	2 March 1992	list
(43828) 1993 FB_{5}	17 March 1993	list
(43829) 1993 FB_{19}	17 March 1993	list
(43830) 1993 FZ_{21}	21 March 1993	list

(43831) 1993 FP_{29}	21 March 1993	list
(43832) 1993 FA_{33}	19 March 1993	list
(43833) 1993 FF_{34}	19 March 1993	list
(43834) 1993 FC_{45}	19 March 1993	list
(43835) 1993 FM_{45}	19 March 1993	list
(43836) 1993 FX_{45}	19 March 1993	list
(43837) 1993 FN_{49}	19 March 1993	list
(43838) 1993 FW_{49}	19 March 1993	list
(43839) 1993 FC_{60}	19 March 1993	list
(43840) 1993 FE_{76}	21 March 1993	list
(46574) 1992 DE_{8}	29 February 1992	list
(46575) 1992 DS_{9}	29 February 1992	list
(46576) 1992 EP_{10}	2 March 1992	list
(46577) 1992 EK_{12}	6 March 1992	list
(46578) 1992 EC_{14}	2 March 1992	list
(46579) 1992 EA_{26}	8 March 1992	list
(46599) 1993 FP_{10}	17 March 1993	list
(46600) 1993 FG_{14}	17 March 1993	list
(46601) 1993 FV_{15}	17 March 1993	list
(46602) 1993 FP_{34}	19 March 1993	list
(46603) 1993 FY_{41}	19 March 1993	list
(46604) 1993 FH_{56}	17 March 1993	list
(48485) 1992 EX_{4}	1 March 1992	list
(48486) 1992 EG_{5}	1 March 1992	list
(48487) 1992 EY_{5}	2 March 1992	list
(48488) 1992 EN_{12}	6 March 1992	list
(48489) 1992 EZ_{28}	2 March 1992	list
(48502) 1993 FL_{5}	17 March 1993	list
(48503) 1993 FN_{6}	17 March 1993	list
(48504) 1993 FK_{9}	17 March 1993	list
(48505) 1993 FM_{10}	17 March 1993	list
(48506) 1993 FO_{10}	17 March 1993	list
(48507) 1993 FS_{11}	17 March 1993	list
(48508) 1993 FF_{12}	17 March 1993	list
(48509) 1993 FQ_{12}	17 March 1993	list
(48510) 1993 FP_{13}	17 March 1993	list
(48511) 1993 FR_{13}	17 March 1993	list
(48512) 1993 FU_{15}	17 March 1993	list
(48513) 1993 FB_{22}	21 March 1993	list
(48514) 1993 FN_{22}	21 March 1993	list
(48515) 1993 FO_{24}	21 March 1993	list
(48516) 1993 FL_{25}	21 March 1993	list
(48517) 1993 FR_{25}	21 March 1993	list
(48518) 1993 FB_{29}	21 March 1993	list
(48519) 1993 FC_{37}	19 March 1993	list
(48520) 1993 FK_{45}	19 March 1993	list
(48521) 1993 FV_{50}	19 March 1993	list
(48522) 1993 FF_{54}	17 March 1993	list
(48523) 1993 FY_{55}	17 March 1993	list
(48524) 1993 FY_{78}	21 March 1993	list

(52319) 1992 DP_{7}	29 February 1992	list
(52320) 1992 DX_{7}	29 February 1992	list
(52321) 1992 DO_{8}	29 February 1992	list
(52322) 1992 DD_{9}	29 February 1992	list
(52323) 1992 DP_{9}	29 February 1992	list
(52324) 1992 DV_{9}	29 February 1992	list
(52326) 1992 EL_{7}	1 March 1992	list
(52327) 1992 EK_{9}	2 March 1992	list
(52328) 1992 EK_{11}	6 March 1992	list
(52329) 1992 ER_{12}	1 March 1992	list
(52330) 1992 EA_{15}	1 March 1992	list
(52331) 1992 EC_{15}	1 March 1992	list
(52332) 1992 EZ_{19}	1 March 1992	list
(52333) 1992 EE_{22}	1 March 1992	list
(52346) 1993 FG_{8}	17 March 1993	list
(52347) 1993 FL_{9}	17 March 1993	list
(52348) 1993 FH_{12}	17 March 1993	list
(52349) 1993 FK_{15}	17 March 1993	list
(52350) 1993 FH_{16}	17 March 1993	list
(52351) 1993 FN_{17}	17 March 1993	list
(52352) 1993 FU_{18}	17 March 1993	list
(52353) 1993 FP_{19}	17 March 1993	list
(52354) 1993 FF_{22}	21 March 1993	list
(52355) 1993 FD_{24}	21 March 1993	list
(52356) 1993 FP_{25}	21 March 1993	list
(52357) 1993 FK_{26}	21 March 1993	list
(52358) 1993 FQ_{26}	21 March 1993	list
(52359) 1993 FM_{27}	21 March 1993	list
(52360) 1993 FC_{30}	21 March 1993	list
(52361) 1993 FT_{30}	21 March 1993	list
(52362) 1993 FS_{31}	19 March 1993	list
(52363) 1993 FP_{37}	19 March 1993	list
(52364) 1993 FG_{38}	19 March 1993	list
(52365) 1993 FS_{38}	19 March 1993	list
(52366) 1993 FN_{39}	19 March 1993	list
(52367) 1993 FO_{39}	19 March 1993	list
(52368) 1993 FQ_{44}	21 March 1993	list
(52369) 1993 FH_{46}	19 March 1993	list
(52370) 1993 FQ_{48}	19 March 1993	list
(52371) 1993 FV_{49}	19 March 1993	list
(52372) 1993 FE_{50}	19 March 1993	list
(52373) 1993 FO_{50}	19 March 1993	list
(52374) 1993 FS_{50}	19 March 1993	list
(52375) 1993 FV_{53}	17 March 1993	list
(52376) 1993 FW_{69}	21 March 1993	list
(52377) 1993 FH_{78}	21 March 1993	list
(52378) 1993 FC_{81}	18 March 1993	list
(52379) 1993 FL_{81}	18 March 1993	list
(55763) 1992 DO_{7}	29 February 1992	list
(55765) 1992 EN_{4}	1 March 1992	list

(55766) 1992 EL_{6}	1 March 1992	list
(55767) 1992 EW_{10}	6 March 1992	list
(55774) 1993 FA_{8}	17 March 1993	list
(55775) 1993 FY_{10}	19 March 1993	list
(55776) 1993 FH_{14}	17 March 1993	list
(55777) 1993 FC_{17}	19 March 1993	list
(55778) 1993 FW_{23}	21 March 1993	list
(55779) 1993 FX_{23}	21 March 1993	list
(55780) 1993 FQ_{34}	19 March 1993	list
(55781) 1993 FN_{36}	19 March 1993	list
(55782) 1993 FF_{41}	19 March 1993	list
(55783) 1993 FZ_{43}	19 March 1993	list
(55784) 1993 FK_{74}	21 March 1993	list
(55785) 1993 FF_{80}	17 March 1993	list
(58193) 1992 DL_{6}	29 February 1992	list
(58194) 1992 DR_{6}	29 February 1992	list
(58195) 1992 DH_{7}	29 February 1992	list
(58199) 1992 EC_{5}	1 March 1992	list
(58200) 1992 EV_{6}	1 March 1992	list
(58201) 1992 ED_{7}	1 March 1992	list
(58202) 1992 EO_{7}	1 March 1992	list
(58203) 1992 EC_{9}	2 March 1992	list
(58204) 1992 EK_{10}	2 March 1992	list
(58205) 1992 EX_{12}	1 March 1992	list
(58206) 1992 ER_{13}	2 March 1992	list
(58207) 1992 EF_{14}	2 March 1992	list
(58208) 1992 EX_{16}	1 March 1992	list
(58209) 1992 EH_{19}	1 March 1992	list
(58210) 1992 EW_{21}	1 March 1992	list
(58222) 1993 FA_{18}	17 March 1993	list
(58223) 1993 FO_{18}	17 March 1993	list
(58224) 1993 FM_{20}	19 March 1993	list
(58225) 1993 FY_{20}	21 March 1993	list
(58226) 1993 FW_{22}	21 March 1993	list
(58227) 1993 FB_{26}	21 March 1993	list
(58228) 1993 FL_{26}	21 March 1993	list
(58229) 1993 FZ_{27}	21 March 1993	list
(58230) 1993 FR_{39}	19 March 1993	list
(58231) 1993 FQ_{40}	19 March 1993	list
(58232) 1993 FD_{41}	19 March 1993	list
(58233) 1993 FN_{50}	19 March 1993	list
(58234) 1993 FY_{50}	19 March 1993	list
(58235) 1993 FW_{52}	17 March 1993	list
(58236) 1993 FK_{56}	17 March 1993	list
(58237) 1993 FR_{66}	21 March 1993	list
(58238) 1993 FH_{77}	21 March 1993	list
(58239) 1993 FS_{77}	21 March 1993	list
(58240) 1993 FV_{81}	18 March 1993	list
(65702) 1992 EK_{4}	1 March 1992	list
(65703) 1992 EY_{4}	1 March 1992	list

(65704) 1992 ED_{16}	1 March 1992	list
(65719) 1993 FY_{17}	17 March 1993	list
(65720) 1993 FN_{19}	17 March 1993	list
(65721) 1993 FV_{28}	21 March 1993	list
(65722) 1993 FY_{35}	19 March 1993	list
(65723) 1993 FO_{45}	19 March 1993	list
(65724) 1993 FV_{46}	19 March 1993	list
(65725) 1993 FB_{52}	17 March 1993	list
(65726) 1993 FL_{60}	19 March 1993	list
(65727) 1993 FY_{70}	21 March 1993	list
(69297) 1992 DT_{8}	29 February 1992	list
(69298) 1992 DR_{9}	29 February 1992	list
(69299) 1992 EW_{6}	1 March 1992	list
(69300) 1992 EH_{7}	1 March 1992	list
(69301) 1992 ES_{8}	2 March 1992	list
(69302) 1992 EZ_{10}	6 March 1992	list
(69303) 1992 EM_{13}	2 March 1992	list
(69304) 1992 EA_{14}	2 March 1992	list
(69305) 1992 EJ_{14}	2 March 1992	list
(69306) 1992 EN_{29}	3 March 1992	list
(69316) 1993 FP_{8}	17 March 1993	list
(69317) 1993 FB_{20}	17 March 1993	list
(69318) 1993 FQ_{20}	19 March 1993	list
(69319) 1993 FA_{29}	21 March 1993	list
(69320) 1993 FJ_{30}	21 March 1993	list
(69321) 1993 FH_{34}	19 March 1993	list
(69322) 1993 FX_{41}	19 March 1993	list
(69323) 1993 FZ_{41}	19 March 1993	list
(69324) 1993 FY_{46}	19 March 1993	list
(69325) 1993 FP_{48}	19 March 1993	list
(69326) 1993 FU_{49}	19 March 1993	list
(69327) 1993 FJ_{60}	19 March 1993	list
(69328) 1993 FY_{80}	18 March 1993	list
(73709) 1992 DV_{7}	29 February 1992	list
(73710) 1992 EL_{21}	4 March 1992	list
(73711) 1992 EW_{24}	4 March 1992	list
(73720) 1993 FR_{9}	17 March 1993	list
(73721) 1993 FZ_{14}	17 March 1993	list
(73722) 1993 FK_{18}	17 March 1993	list
(73723) 1993 FJ_{20}	19 March 1993	list
(73724) 1993 FA_{25}	21 March 1993	list
(73725) 1993 FC_{27}	21 March 1993	list
(73726) 1993 FD_{29}	21 March 1993	list
(73727) 1993 FT_{39}	19 March 1993	list
(73728) 1993 FP_{40}	19 March 1993	list
(73729) 1993 FH_{41}	19 March 1993	list
(73730) 1993 FL_{46}	19 March 1993	list
(73731) 1993 FS_{47}	19 March 1993	list
(73732) 1993 FH_{60}	19 March 1993	list
(73733) 1993 FD_{83}	19 March 1993	list

(79145) 1992 EL_{13}	2 March 1992	list
(79153) 1993 FV_{4}	17 March 1993	list
(79154) 1993 FF_{5}	17 March 1993	list
(79155) 1993 FN_{8}	17 March 1993	list
(79156) 1993 FA_{12}	17 March 1993	list
(79157) 1993 FE_{16}	17 March 1993	list
(79158) 1993 FB_{17}	19 March 1993	list
(79159) 1993 FP_{17}	17 March 1993	list
(79160) 1993 FO_{19}	17 March 1993	list
(79161) 1993 FW_{19}	17 March 1993	list
(79162) 1993 FU_{20}	19 March 1993	list
(79163) 1993 FK_{24}	21 March 1993	list
(79164) 1993 FE_{27}	21 March 1993	list
(79165) 1993 FR_{27}	21 March 1993	list
(79166) 1993 FU_{29}	21 March 1993	list
(79167) 1993 FM_{32}	21 March 1993	list
(79168) 1993 FP_{33}	19 March 1993	list
(79169) 1993 FY_{33}	19 March 1993	list
(79170) 1993 FT_{34}	19 March 1993	list
(79171) 1993 FM_{37}	19 March 1993	list
(79172) 1993 FX_{38}	19 March 1993	list
(79173) 1993 FE_{41}	19 March 1993	list
(79174) 1993 FC_{46}	19 March 1993	list
(79175) 1993 FU_{47}	19 March 1993	list
(79176) 1993 FA_{50}	19 March 1993	list
(79177) 1993 FG_{50}	19 March 1993	list
(79178) 1993 FN_{54}	17 March 1993	list
(79179) 1993 FX_{56}	17 March 1993	list
(79180) 1993 FR_{62}	19 March 1993	list
(79181) 1993 FT_{75}	21 March 1993	list
(79182) 1993 FS_{82}	19 March 1993	list
(85202) 1992 DR_{11}	29 February 1992	list
(85203) 1992 EE_{5}	1 March 1992	list
(85204) 1992 EX_{5}	2 March 1992	list
(85205) 1992 EM_{6}	1 March 1992	list
(85206) 1992 EQ_{7}	1 March 1992	list
(85207) 1992 EB_{19}	1 March 1992	list
(85208) 1992 EG_{20}	1 March 1992	list
(85218) 1993 FW_{5}	17 March 1993	list
(85219) 1993 FM_{9}	17 March 1993	list
(85220) 1993 FY_{11}	17 March 1993	list
(85221) 1993 FX_{13}	17 March 1993	list
(85222) 1993 FO_{14}	17 March 1993	list
(85223) 1993 FU_{22}	21 March 1993	list
(85224) 1993 FT_{28}	21 March 1993	list
(85225) 1993 FP_{31}	19 March 1993	list
(85226) 1993 FQ_{37}	19 March 1993	list
(85227) 1993 FT_{40}	19 March 1993	list
(85228) 1993 FU_{45}	19 March 1993	list
(85229) 1993 FU_{46}	19 March 1993	list

(85230) 1993 FM_{52}	17 March 1993	list
(85231) 1993 FR_{52}	17 March 1993	list
(85232) 1993 FT_{52}	17 March 1993	list
(85233) 1993 FA_{53}	17 March 1993	list
(90727) 1992 DP_{5}	29 February 1992	list
(90728) 1992 EW_{8}	2 March 1992	list
(90729) 1992 ED_{21}	2 March 1992	list
(90730) 1992 EO_{23}	2 March 1992	list
(90734) 1993 FW_{6}	17 March 1993	list
(90735) 1993 FC_{10}	17 March 1993	list
(90736) 1993 FB_{15}	17 March 1993	list
(90737) 1993 FQ_{15}	17 March 1993	list
(90738) 1993 FP_{21}	21 March 1993	list
(90739) 1993 FM_{31}	19 March 1993	list
(90740) 1993 FZ_{31}	19 March 1993	list
(90741) 1993 FE_{36}	19 March 1993	list
(90742) 1993 FX_{44}	19 March 1993	list
(90743) 1993 FE_{58}	19 March 1993	list
(90744) 1993 FT_{80}	18 March 1993	list
(96196) 1992 EQ_{4}	1 March 1992	list
(96197) 1992 EF_{6}	1 March 1992	list
(96198) 1992 EF_{13}	2 March 1992	list
(96199) 1992 EY_{24}	4 March 1992	list
(96207) 1993 FK_{4}	17 March 1993	list
(96208) 1993 FY_{6}	17 March 1993	list
(96209) 1993 FA_{9}	17 March 1993	list
(96210) 1993 FR_{14}	17 March 1993	list
(96211) 1993 FU_{23}	21 March 1993	list
(96212) 1993 FK_{27}	21 March 1993	list
(96213) 1993 FZ_{30}	19 March 1993	list
(96214) 1993 FB_{42}	19 March 1993	list
(100057) 1992 DE_{10}	29 February 1992	list
(100059) 1992 EE_{4}	1 March 1992	list
(100060) 1992 ET_{4}	1 March 1992	list
(100061) 1992 EL_{5}	1 March 1992	list
(100062) 1992 EH_{9}	2 March 1992	list
(100063) 1992 EY_{13}	2 March 1992	list
(100064) 1992 EL_{20}	1 March 1992	list
(100065) 1992 ES_{25}	8 March 1992	list
(100066) 1992 EV_{25}	8 March 1992	list
(100067) 1992 EY_{26}	2 March 1992	list
(100068) 1992 EH_{28}	8 March 1992	list
(100069) 1992 ED_{29}	2 March 1992	list
(100070) 1992 EX_{29}	3 March 1992	list
(100071) 1992 ET_{30}	1 March 1992	list
(100072) 1992 EY_{30}	1 March 1992	list
(100073) 1992 EV_{31}	1 March 1992	list
(100090) 1993 FX_{5}	17 March 1993	list
(100091) 1993 FT_{6}	17 March 1993	list
(100092) 1993 FK_{8}	17 March 1993	list

(100093) 1993 FL_{10}	17 March 1993	list
(100094) 1993 FJ_{13}	17 March 1993	list
(100095) 1993 FN_{13}	17 March 1993	list
(100096) 1993 FG_{18}	17 March 1993	list
(100097) 1993 FK_{19}	17 March 1993	list
(100098) 1993 FZ_{19}	17 March 1993	list
(100099) 1993 FG_{21}	21 March 1993	list
(100100) 1993 FB_{25}	21 March 1993	list
(100101) 1993 FZ_{28}	21 March 1993	list
(100102) 1993 FU_{30}	19 March 1993	list
(100103) 1993 FC_{33}	19 March 1993	list
(100104) 1993 FQ_{33}	19 March 1993	list
(100105) 1993 FK_{35}	19 March 1993	list
(100106) 1993 FW_{35}	19 March 1993	list
(100107) 1993 FH_{39}	19 March 1993	list
(100108) 1993 FF_{45}	19 March 1993	list
(100109) 1993 FN_{46}	19 March 1993	list
(100110) 1993 FV_{47}	19 March 1993	list
(100111) 1993 FA_{51}	19 March 1993	list
(100112) 1993 FM_{57}	17 March 1993	list
(100113) 1993 FW_{73}	21 March 1993	list
(100114) 1993 FQ_{82}	19 March 1993	list
(118177) 1992 EZ_{13}	2 March 1992	list
(118179) 1993 FC_{6}	17 March 1993	list
(118180) 1993 FF_{6}	17 March 1993	list
(118181) 1993 FD_{7}	17 March 1993	list
(118182) 1993 FH_{18}	17 March 1993	list
(118183) 1993 FQ_{22}	21 March 1993	list
(118184) 1993 FX_{22}	21 March 1993	list
(118185) 1993 FF_{29}	21 March 1993	list
(120469) 1992 DG_{9}	29 February 1992	list
(120470) 1992 DY_{10}	29 February 1992	list
(120472) 1992 ET_{7}	1 March 1992	list
(120473) 1992 EE_{9}	2 March 1992	list
(120474) 1992 EH_{14}	2 March 1992	list
(120475) 1992 EF_{16}	1 March 1992	list
(120476) 1992 EB_{31}	1 March 1992	list
(120484) 1993 FR_{7}	17 March 1993	list
(120485) 1993 FW_{7}	17 March 1993	list
(120486) 1993 FG_{11}	17 March 1993	list
(120487) 1993 FP_{12}	17 March 1993	list
(120488) 1993 FZ_{16}	19 March 1993	list
(120489) 1993 FL_{19}	17 March 1993	list
(120490) 1993 FA_{24}	21 March 1993	list
(120491) 1993 FM_{29}	21 March 1993	list
(120492) 1993 FO_{30}	21 March 1993	list
(120493) 1993 FJ_{45}	19 March 1993	list
(120494) 1993 FZ_{45}	19 March 1993	list
(120495) 1993 FZ_{46}	19 March 1993	list
(120496) 1993 FB_{50}	19 March 1993	list

(120497) 1993 FF_{50}	19 March 1993	list
(120498) 1993 FD_{53}	17 March 1993	list
(129456) 1992 DR_{7}	29 February 1992	list
(129457) 1992 EH_{5}	1 March 1992	list
(129458) 1992 EQ_{6}	1 March 1992	list
(129459) 1992 ED_{10}	2 March 1992	list
(129461) 1993 FJ_{5}	17 March 1993	list
(129462) 1993 FU_{9}	17 March 1993	list
(129463) 1993 FA_{10}	17 March 1993	list
(129464) 1993 FF_{23}	21 March 1993	list
(129465) 1993 FC_{41}	19 March 1993	list
(129466) 1993 FM_{44}	19 March 1993	list
(129467) 1993 FM_{47}	19 March 1993	list
(129468) 1993 FZ_{52}	17 March 1993	list
(129469) 1993 FU_{69}	21 March 1993	list
(134349) 1993 FC_{19}	17 March 1993	list
(134350) 1993 FH_{33}	19 March 1993	list
(136583) 1992 DL_{9}	29 February 1992	list
(136584) 1992 EE_{28}	8 March 1992	list
(136587) 1993 FM_{4}	17 March 1993	list
(136588) 1993 FF_{7}	17 March 1993	list
(136589) 1993 FD_{8}	17 March 1993	list
(136590) 1993 FE_{14}	17 March 1993	list
(136591) 1993 FN_{18}	17 March 1993	list
(136592) 1993 FE_{19}	17 March 1993	list
(136593) 1993 FX_{19}	17 March 1993	list
(136594) 1993 FK_{28}	21 March 1993	list
(136595) 1993 FH_{29}	21 March 1993	list
(136596) 1993 FG_{30}	21 March 1993	list
(136597) 1993 FA_{31}	19 March 1993	list
(136598) 1993 FJ_{31}	19 March 1993	list
(136599) 1993 FR_{37}	19 March 1993	list
(136600) 1993 FL_{38}	19 March 1993	list
(136601) 1993 FC_{49}	19 March 1993	list
(145714) 1992 DK_{7}	29 February 1992	list
(145715) 1992 DX_{10}	29 February 1992	list
(145716) 1993 FC_{23}	21 March 1993	list
(145717) 1993 FQ_{41}	19 March 1993	list
(145718) 1993 FT_{57}	19 March 1993	list
(145719) 1993 FG_{81}	18 March 1993	list
(147953) 1993 FB_{75}	21 March 1993	list
(150116) 1993 FE_{33}	19 March 1993	list
(150117) 1993 FF_{43}	19 March 1993	list
(152566) 1993 FH_{17}	17 March 1993	list
(152567) 1993 FF_{32}	19 March 1993	list
(152568) 1993 FN_{33}	19 March 1993	list
(152569) 1993 FH_{50}	19 March 1993	list
(152570) 1993 FL_{69}	21 March 1993	list
(155378) 1993 FF_{9}	17 March 1993	list
(155379) 1993 FP_{50}	19 March 1993	list

(155380) 1993 FU_{56}	17 March 1993	list
(155381) 1993 FY_{64}	21 March 1993	list
(157792) 1993 FT_{10}	19 March 1993	list
(162006) 1993 FU_{16}	19 March 1993	list
(162007) 1993 FC_{32}	19 March 1993	list
(164619) 1992 EF_{4}	1 March 1992	list
(164622) 1993 FN_{5}	17 March 1993	list
(164623) 1993 FR_{38}	19 March 1993	list
(164624) 1993 FK_{44}	19 March 1993	list
(168322) 1992 EX_{7}	2 March 1992	list
(168323) 1992 ED_{23}	1 March 1992	list
(168324) 1993 FA_{19}	17 March 1993	list
(168325) 1993 FT_{27}	21 March 1993	list
(168326) 1993 FJ_{59}	19 March 1993	list
(168327) 1993 FZ_{60}	19 March 1993	list
(173123) 1993 FB_{35}	19 March 1993	list
(173124) 1993 FX_{47}	19 March 1993	list
(175663) 1993 FD_{48}	19 March 1993	list
(178295) 1992 DJ_{6}	29 February 1992	list
(178297) 1993 FK_{31}	19 March 1993	list
(178298) 1993 FT_{51}	17 March 1993	list
(178299) 1993 FU_{53}	17 March 1993	list
(181707) 1992 EN_{6}	1 March 1992	list
(181709) 1993 FD_{32}	19 March 1993	list
(185659) 1993 FT_{45}	19 March 1993	list
(187747) 1993 FS_{21}	21 March 1993	list
(187748) 1993 FW_{33}	19 March 1993	list
(187749) 1993 FC_{61}	19 March 1993	list
(189410) 1993 FO_{51}	17 March 1993	list
(190285) 1993 FH_{8}	17 March 1993	list
(190286) 1993 FV_{9}	17 March 1993	list
(190287) 1993 FR_{54}	17 March 1993	list
(192297) 1992 DX_{9}	29 February 1992	list
(192299) 1992 EW_{4}	1 March 1992	list
(192303) 1993 FJ_{7}	17 March 1993	list
(192304) 1993 FK_{40}	19 March 1993	list
(192305) 1993 FE_{45}	19 March 1993	list
(192306) 1993 FB_{80}	17 March 1993	list
(200089) 1993 FY_{9}	17 March 1993	list
(202891) 1992 EO_{10}	2 March 1992	list
(204970) 1992 DQ_{6}	29 February 1992	list
(204971) 1993 FG_{9}	17 March 1993	list
(207948) 1993 FL_{12}	17 March 1993	list
(207949) 1993 FX_{33}	19 March 1993	list
(210457) 1993 FH_{9}	17 March 1993	list
(210458) 1993 FV_{42}	19 March 1993	list
(213003) 1992 EC_{23}	1 March 1992	list
(219022) 1993 FP_{75}	21 March 1993	list
(221947) 1992 DW_{9}	29 February 1992	list
(221948) 1993 FO_{59}	19 March 1993	list

(225280) 1993 FL_{17}	17 March 1993	list
(225281) 1993 FL_{35}	19 March 1993	list
(231669) 1993 FC_{50}	19 March 1993	list
(233973) 1993 FX_{4}	17 March 1993	list
(233974) 1993 FG_{45}	19 March 1993	list
(237362) 1993 FY_{31}	19 March 1993	list
(241566) 1993 FO_{9}	17 March 1993	list
(257464) 1993 FC_{26}	21 March 1993	list
(264260) 1993 FV_{35}	19 March 1993	list
(267007) 1993 FD_{14}	17 March 1993	list
(267008) 1993 FS_{62}	19 March 1993	list
(270500) 2002 EY_{149}	19 March 1993	list
(285083) 1992 DS_{8}	29 February 1992	list
(285086) 1993 FA_{38}	19 March 1993	list
(316652) 1992 EK_{13}	2 March 1992	list
(328183) 2008 DN_{36}	21 March 1993	list
(331450) 2012 HC_{16}	1 March 1992	list
(336767) 2011 BU_{19}	21 March 1993	list
(343927) 2011 KO_{9}	19 March 1993	list
(347482) 1993 FQ_{19}	17 March 1993	list
(376220) 2011 EG_{13}	21 March 1993	list
(376537) 2012 TW_{9}	21 March 1993	list
(437697) 2014 DQ_{32}	31 August 1995	list

== See also ==
- List of asteroid-discovering observatories
- List of minor planet discoverers § Discovering dedicated institutions
- Uppsala–DLR Asteroid Survey, UDAS
- Uppsala–DLR Trojan Survey, UDTS
