= 961 Gunnie =

Very dark background asteroid

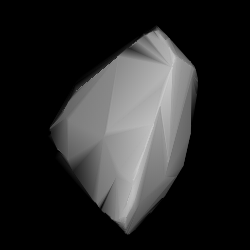
- Modelled shape of Gunnie from its lightcurve

Discovery
- Discovered by: K. Reinmuth
- Discovery site: Heidelberg Obs.
- Discovery date: 10 October 1921

Designations
- Named after: Gunnie Asplind; (daughter of Bror Asplind)
- Alternative designations: A921 TH · 1930 XT; 1968 HO · 1921 KM
- Minor planet category: main-belt · (middle) background

Orbital characteristics
- Epoch 31 May 2020 (JD 2459000.5)
- Uncertainty parameter 0
- Observation arc: 98.23 yr (35,880 d)
- Aphelion: 2.9391 AU
- Perihelion: 2.4485 AU
- Semi-major axis: 2.6938 AU
- Eccentricity: 0.0911
- Orbital period (sidereal): 4.42 yr (1,615 d)
- Mean anomaly: 181.91°
- Mean motion: 0° 13^{m} 22.44^{s} / day
- Inclination: 10.991°
- Longitude of ascending node: 26.616°
- Argument of perihelion: 285.28°

Physical characteristics
- Mean diameter: 31.49±0.55 km; 36.571±0.307 km; 37.82±0.9 km
- Synodic rotation period: 21.361±0.002 h
- Pole ecliptic latitude: (37.0°, 24.0°) (λ_{1}/β_{1}); (220.0°, 7.0°) (λ_{2}/β_{2})
- Geometric albedo: 0.036±0.004; 0.0373±0.002; 0.055±0.002
- Spectral type: SMASS = X; C (SDSS-MOC)
- Absolute magnitude (H): 11.5

961 Gunnie (prov. designation: A921 TH or 1921 KM) is a very dark background asteroid from the central regions of the asteroid belt, approximately 37 kilometers (23 miles) in diameter. It was discovered on 10 October 1921, by German astronomer Karl Reinmuth at the Heidelberg-Königstuhl State Observatory. The C/X-type asteroid has a rotation period of 21.4 hours. It was named after Gunnie Asplind, daughter of Swedish astronomer Bror Asplind (1890–1954).

== Orbit and classification ==
Gunnie is a non-family asteroid of the main belt's background population when applying the hierarchical clustering method to its proper orbital elements. It orbits the Sun in the central asteroid belt at a distance of 2.4–2.9 AU once every 4 years and 5 months (1,615 days; semi-major axis of 2.69 AU). Its orbit has an eccentricity of 0.09 and an inclination of 11° with respect to the ecliptic. The body's observation arc begins at the South African Johannesburg Observatory in June 1951, or 30 years after its official discovery observation at Heidelberg Observatory.

== Naming ==
This minor planet was named after Gunnie Asplind, daughter of Swedish astronomer Bror Ansgar Asplind (1890–1954). Asteroids 958 Asplinda, 959 Arne and 960 Birgit are named after him and his other two children, respectively. The naming was mentioned in The Names of the Minor Planets by Paul Herget in 1955 (H 92).

== Physical characteristics ==
In the Bus–Binzel SMASS classification, Gunnie is an X-type asteroid, while in the SDSS-based taxonomy, it is a carbonaceous C-type asteroid.

=== Rotation period ===
In 2018, Czech astronomers Josef Ďurech and Josef Hanuš published a modeled lightcurve using photometric data from the Gaia probe's second data release. It showed a sidereal period of 21.361±0.002 hours (Q=2), and gave two spin axes at (37.0°, 24.0°) and (220.0°, 7.0°) in ecliptic coordinates (λ, β).

=== Diameter and albedo ===
According to the surveys carried out by the Japanese Akari satellite, the NEOWISE mission of NASA's Wide-field Infrared Survey Explorer (WISE), and the Infrared Astronomical Satellite IRAS, Gunnie measures 31.49±0.55, 36.571±0.307 and 37.82±0.9 kilometers in diameter, and its surface has an albedo of 0.055±0.002, 0.036±0.004 and 0.0373±0.002, respectively. Other published measurements by the WISE team give a mean diameter as small as 31.77±7.41 km and as large as 40.640±10.162 km. The Collaborative Asteroid Lightcurve Link derives an albedo of 0.0311 and a diameter of 37.78 km based on an absolute magnitude of 11.5.
