= 9617 Grahamchapman =

Asteroid

Discovery
- Discovered by: UESAC
- Discovery site: La Silla Obs.
- Discovery date: 17 March 1993

Designations
- Named after: Graham Chapman (Monty Python)
- Alternative designations: 1993 FA_{5} · 1991 RN_{18}
- Minor planet category: main-belt · Flora

Orbital characteristics
- Epoch 4 September 2017 (JD 2458000.5)
- Uncertainty parameter 0
- Observation arc: 64.84 yr (23,681 days)
- Aphelion: 2.4770 AU
- Perihelion: 1.9711 AU
- Semi-major axis: 2.2240 AU
- Eccentricity: 0.1137
- Orbital period (sidereal): 3.32 yr (1,211 days)
- Mean anomaly: 216.44°
- Mean motion: 0° 17^{m} 49.92^{s} / day
- Inclination: 6.1378°
- Longitude of ascending node: 165.58°
- Argument of perihelion: 281.27°
- Known satellites: 1

Physical characteristics
- Dimensions: 2.840 km 2.849 km 2.85 km (taken)
- Synodic rotation period: 2.2856 h 2.28561±0.00006 h 2.28561±0.00009 h
- Geometric albedo: 0.2237; 0.2445±0.0393
- Spectral type: S
- Absolute magnitude (H): 14.37±0.23 (R) · 14.43±0.2 (R) · 14.7 · 14.88 · 14.97±0.078 · 15.03±0.34

9617 Grahamchapman, provisional designation 1993 FA_{5}, is a binary Florian asteroid from the inner regions of the asteroid belt, approximately 2.8 kilometers in diameter.

The asteroid was discovered on 17 March 1993, during the Uppsala–ESO Survey of Asteroids and Comets (UESAC) at ESO's La Silla Observatory in northern Chile. It was named for actor and Monty Python member, Graham Chapman.

== Orbit and classification ==
Grahamchapman is a member of the Flora family, one of the largest collisional groups of stony asteroids. It orbits the Sun in the inner main-belt at a distance of 2.0–2.5 AU once every 3 years and 4 months (1,211 days). Its orbit has an eccentricity of 0.11 and an inclination of 6° with respect to the ecliptic. A first precovery was taken at Palomar Observatory in 1951, extending the body's observation arc by 42 years prior to its official discovery observation at La Silla.

== Physical characteristics ==
=== Diameter and albedo ===
According to the survey carried out by NASA's Wide-field Infrared Survey Explorer with its subsequent NEOWISE mission, Grahamchapman measures 2.84 kilometers in diameter and its surface has an albedo of 0.245. The Collaborative Asteroid Lightcurve Link agrees with Petr Pravec's revised NEOWISE data and gives an albedo of 0.224 with a diameter of 2.85 kilometers with an absolute magnitude of 14.97.

=== Asteroid moon ===
In February 2006, observations by the Ondřejov NEO Photometric Program determined that Grahamchapman is orbited by a minor-planet moon. The satellite is about a quarter the size of Grahamchapman, and orbits it about once every 19 hours, 23 minutes, and 5 seconds.

=== Rotation period and shape ===
The lightcurve study also showed that Grahamchapman itself has a rotation period of 2.28561 hours with a brightness variation of 0.10 magnitude (U=3). A second photometric observation in December 2008, gave an identical period with an amplitude of 0.11 magnitude (U=3). A low brightness amplitude typically indicates that the body has a nearly spheroidal shape.

== Naming ==
This minor planet is named after the comic actor Graham Chapman (1941–1989). It is the first in a series of six asteroids carrying the names of members of the Monty Python comedy troupe, the others being 9618 Johncleese, 9619 Terrygilliam, 9620 Ericidle, 9621 Michaelpalin and 9622 Terryjones. The approved naming citation was published by the Minor Planet Center on 20 March 2000 (M.P.C. 39653).
