= 17198 Gorjup =

Main-belt asteroid

Discovery
- Discovered by: LINEAR
- Discovery site: Lincoln Lab's ETS
- Discovery date: 3 January 2000

Designations
- Named after: Niko Gorjup (2003 ISEF awardee)
- Alternative designations: 2000 AA_{31} · 1990 EH_{6} 1998 QU_{102}
- Minor planet category: main-belt · Flora

Orbital characteristics
- Epoch 4 September 2017 (JD 2458000.5)
- Uncertainty parameter 0
- Observation arc: 26.90 yr (9,825 days)
- Aphelion: 2.5125 AU
- Perihelion: 2.0465 AU
- Semi-major axis: 2.2795 AU
- Eccentricity: 0.1022
- Orbital period (sidereal): 3.44 yr (1,257 days)
- Mean anomaly: 261.02°
- Mean motion: 0° 17^{m} 11.04^{s} / day
- Inclination: 3.2856°
- Longitude of ascending node: 12.149°
- Argument of perihelion: 252.36°

Physical characteristics
- Dimensions: 2.71 km (calculated)
- Synodic rotation period: 3.2430±0.0005 h
- Geometric albedo: 0.24 (assumed)
- Spectral type: S
- Absolute magnitude (H): 15.0

17198 Gorjup (provisional designation 2000 AA_{31}) is a stony Flora asteroid and asteroid pair from the inner regions of the asteroid belt, approximately 2.7 kilometers in diameter. It was discovered on 3 January 2000, by the Lincoln Near-Earth Asteroid Research team at the Lincoln Laboratory Experimental Test Site in Socorro, New Mexico, United States. The asteroid was named for Slovenian Niko Gorjup, a 2003 awardee of the ISEF contest.

== Orbit and classification ==
Gorjup is a member of the Flora family, one of the largest families of stony asteroids. It orbits the Sun in the inner main belt at a distance of 2.0–2.5 AU once every 3 years and 5 months (1,257 days). Its orbit has an eccentricity of 0.10 and an inclination of 3° concerning the ecliptic.

The asteroid was first identified as 1990 EH_{6} at ESO's La Silla Observatory in March 1990, extending the body's observation arc by almost 10 years before its official discovery observation at Socorro.

== Physical characteristics ==
=== Diameter estimate ===
The Collaborative Asteroid Lightcurve Link assumes an albedo of 0.24 – derived from 8 Flora the family's largest member and namesake – and calculates a diameter of 2.71 kilometers with an absolute magnitude of 15.0.

=== Asteroid pair ===
Gorjup is a paired asteroid with (229056) 2004 FC_{126}. It is thought that asteroid pairs are formed by a single parent body, that broke up into a proto-binary system due to its rotation. Soon after, such systems disrupt their own internal dynamics into pairs.

=== Lightcurve ===
A rotational light curve of Gorjup was obtained from photometric observations made by Czech astronomer Petr Pravec at Ondřejov Observatory in August 2008. The lightcurve gave a well-defined rotation period of 3.2430 hours with a brightness variation of 0.12 magnitude (U=3).

== Naming ==
This minor planet was named after Slovenian Niko Gorjup (born 1984) an awardee in the Intel International Science and Engineering Fair (ISEF) in 2003. At the time, he attended the Solski Center Nova Gorica, Gimnazija, Nova Gorica, Slovenia. The approved naming citation was published by the Minor Planet Center on 14 June 2004 (M.P.C. 52173).
