= 10551 Göteborg =

Asteroid

Discovery
- Discovered by: E. W. Elst
- Discovery site: CERGA (Caussols Obs.)
- Discovery date: 18 December 1992

Designations
- Named after: Gothenburg (Swedish city)
- Alternative designations: 1992 YL_{2} · 1931 AK; 1994 EB_{3}
- Minor planet category: main-belt · Eos

Orbital characteristics
- Epoch 4 September 2017 (JD 2458000.5)
- Uncertainty parameter 0
- Observation arc: 85.88 yr (31,367 days)
- Aphelion: 3.1824 AU
- Perihelion: 2.8048 AU
- Semi-major axis: 2.9936 AU
- Eccentricity: 0.0631
- Orbital period (sidereal): 5.18 yr (1,892 days)
- Mean anomaly: 271.72°
- Mean motion: 0° 11^{m} 25.08^{s} / day
- Inclination: 11.381°
- Longitude of ascending node: 93.068°
- Argument of perihelion: 8.4760°

Physical characteristics
- Dimensions: 11.53 km (calculated); 15.491±0.101 km 15.689±0.128
- Synodic rotation period: 335.3458±4.6612 h
- Geometric albedo: 0.084±0.010; 0.1169±0.0139; 0.14 (assumed)
- Spectral type: S
- Absolute magnitude (H): 11.993±0.005 (R) · 12.0 · 12.03±0.33 · 12.1 · 12.44

10551 Göteborg, provisional designation 1992 YL_{2}, is a stony Eoan asteroid and slow rotator from the outer region of the asteroid belt, approximately 13 kilometers in diameter. It was discovered on 18 December 1992, by Belgian astronomer Eric Elst at CERGA in Caussols (010), southeastern France. The asteroid was named after the Swedish city of Gothenburg (Göteborg).

== Orbit and classification ==
Göteborg is a member of the Eos family, an orbital group of more than 4,000 asteroids, which are well known for mostly being of stony composition with a relatively high albedo. It orbits the Sun in the outer main-belt at a distance of 2.8–3.2 AU once every 5 years and 2 months (1,892 days). Its orbit has an eccentricity of 0.06 and an inclination of 11° with respect to the ecliptic.

The body's observation arc begins 61 years prior to its official discovery observation, with a precovery taken the night before its first identification as 1931 AK at Lowell Observatory in January 1931.

== Physical characteristics ==
=== Slow rotator ===
In September 2012, photometric observations of Göteborg at the Palomar Transient Factory, California, rendered a rotational lightcurve with a period of 335.3458 hours, or 14 days, and a brightness variation of 0.70 magnitude (U=2). This makes a slow rotator, as most asteroids of this size typically have much shorter rotation periods.

=== Diameter and albedo ===
According to the survey carried out by the NEOWISE mission of NASA's Wide-field Infrared Survey Explorer, Göteborg measures 15.491 and 15.689 kilometers in diameter and its surface has an albedo of 0.084 and 0.1169, respectively The Collaborative Asteroid Lightcurve Link assumes an albedo of 0.14, taken from 221 Eos, the family's largest member and namesake – and calculates a diameter of 11.53 kilometers based on an absolute magnitude of 12.44.

== Naming ==
This minor planet was named after Gothenburg (Göteborg), Sweden's second-largest city and the largest port in the Nordic countries, located on the country's southwest coast. Founded in the early 17th century and heavily influenced by the Dutch, the city still has its typical canal system. Later, the Swedes acquired political power over Gothenburg and the city flourished with the development of the Swedish East India Company in the early 18th century. The approved naming citation was published by the Minor Planet Center on 20 March 2000 (M.P.C. 39655).
