= 376 Geometria =

Main-belt asteroid

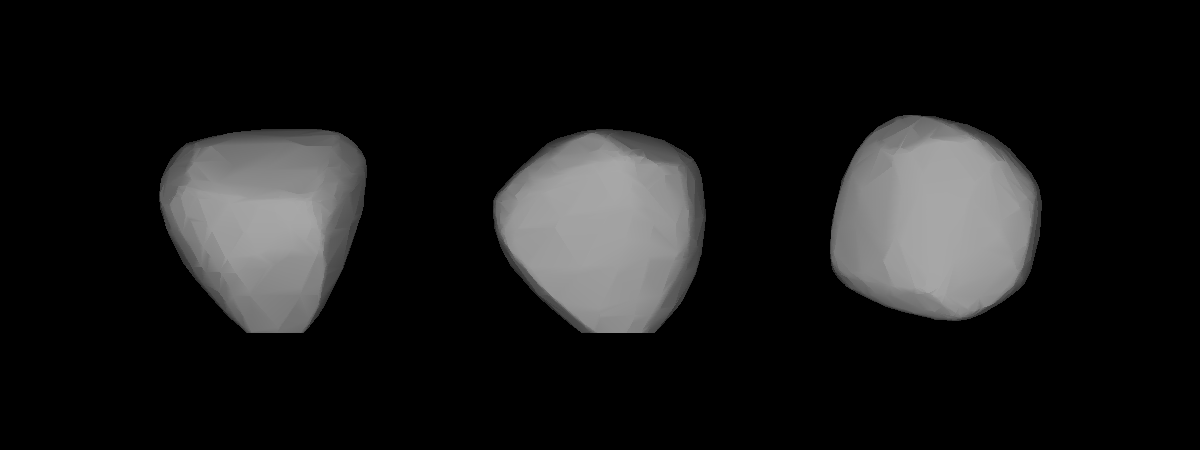
- A three-dimensional model of 376 Geometria based on its light curve

Discovery
- Discovered by: Auguste Charlois
- Discovery site: Nice Observatory
- Discovery date: 18 September 1893

Designations
- Pronunciation: /ˌdʒiːəˈmɛtriə, dʒiə-/
- Named after: geometry
- Alternative designations: A893 SC · 1950 BQ_{1} · 1954 BJ (Note: The MPC notates Geometria's retroactively applied designation as 1893 SC. Its old-style designation was 1893 AM.)
- Minor planet category: Main belt

Orbital characteristics
- Epoch 21 November 2025 (JD 2461000.5)
- Uncertainty parameter 0
- Observation arc: 126.70 yr (46278 d)
- Aphelion: 2.68253 AU (401.301 Gm)
- Perihelion: 1.89377 AU (283.304 Gm)
- Semi-major axis: 2.28815 AU (342.302 Gm)
- Eccentricity: 0.172358
- Orbital period (sidereal): 3.46126 yr (1264.23 d)
- Mean anomaly: 151.513°
- Mean motion: 0° 17^{m} 5.132^{s} / day
- Inclination: 5.43065°
- Longitude of ascending node: 301.948°
- Argument of perihelion: 316.527°
- Jupiter MOID: 2.3929 AU (357.97 Gm)
- T_{Jupiter}: 3.575

Physical characteristics
- Mean diameter: 35.465 km
- Sidereal rotation period: 7.7274600 ± 9.6×10^{−6} h (0.3219775 ± 0.0000004 d)
- Pole ecliptic longitude: 57±5° or 240±5°
- Pole ecliptic latitude: −22±5° or −35±5°
- Geometric albedo: 0.321
- Spectral type: S (Tholen); SI (SMASSII)
- Absolute magnitude (H): 9.49

376 Geometria is an asteroid located within the main asteroid belt that was discovered by French astronomer Auguste Charlois on 18 September 1893 in Nice, France. It is classified as an S-type asteroid. It is about 35.5 kilometres (22.1 mi) in size and has a rotation period of 7.73 hours.

== History ==
Geometria was discovered by astronomer Auguste Charlois on 18 September 1893 at Nice Observatory. Upon its discovery, it was given the old-style provisional designation 1893 AM, and by the next year it was assigned the permanent number (376). On 23 August 1901, it was named Geometria after the Latin word geometria, referring to the field of geometry. Its name was announced by Johann Bauschinger alongside those of 33 other minor planets on the journal Astronomische Nachrichten, with the names having been selected by the Astronomical Calculation Institute.

In 1925, the old-style minor planet provisional designation scheme was replaced by the system currently in use. The Minor Planet Center (MPC) has since retroactively replaced old-style designations with new-style designations. Thus, Geometria's provisional designation given upon its discovery was replaced by A893 SC.

== Orbit ==
Geometria orbits the Sun at an average distance—its semi-major axis—of 2.29 astronomical units (AU), taking 3.46 years to complete one revolution. Along its orbit, its distance from the Sun varies between 1.89 AU at perihelion to 2.68 AU at aphelion due to its orbital eccentricity of 0.17. Its orbit is inclined by 5.43° with respect to the ecliptic plane.

== Physical characteristics ==
Geometria has an estimated diameter of 35.5 kilometres (22.1 mi), with a roughly spherical shape. It is classified as an S-type asteroid in the Tholen classification scheme and an SI-type asteroid in the Small Main-belt Asteroid Spectroscopic Survey, Phase II (SMASSII) classification scheme. It has a geometric albedo of 0.321.

Observations of Geometria's lightcurve, or variations in its observed brightness, show that it has a rotation period of 7.73 hours, accurately measured to within 0.035 seconds. It has a retrograde rotation, rotating backwards relative to its orbital direction with its rotational pole pointed towards the ecliptic south. Determinations of Geometria's rotation period remained relatively consistent in the past, with 1983 observations from the Observatoire de Haute-Provence yielding a period of 7.74±0.02 hours and observations taken in November 1994 yielding a period of 7.734 hours. However, past attempts at determining Geometria's spin orientation were ambiguous.
