= 1049 Gotho =

Carbonaceous asteroid

Discovery
- Discovered by: K. Reinmuth
- Discovery site: Heidelberg Obs.
- Discovery date: 14 September 1925

Designations
- Named after: unknown
- Alternative designations: 1925 RB · A906 DD
- Minor planet category: main-belt · (outer)

Orbital characteristics
- Epoch 4 September 2017 (JD 2458000.5)
- Uncertainty parameter 0
- Observation arc: 91.64 yr (33,470 days)
- Aphelion: 3.5133 AU
- Perihelion: 2.6726 AU
- Semi-major axis: 3.0930 AU
- Eccentricity: 0.1359
- Orbital period (sidereal): 5.44 yr (1,987 days)
- Mean anomaly: 295.00°
- Mean motion: 0° 10^{m} 52.32^{s} / day
- Inclination: 15.110°
- Longitude of ascending node: 342.86°
- Argument of perihelion: 41.244°

Physical characteristics
- Dimensions: 51.05 km (derived); 53.56±16.68 km 53.84±19.48 km 54.77±0.76 km 56.296±0.204 km 63.874±0.177 km
- Synodic rotation period: 8.470±0.007 h
- Geometric albedo: 0.0069±0.0005; 0.008±0.001; 0.03±0.03; 0.04±0.06; 0.045±0.001; 0.0469 (derived)
- Spectral type: C
- Absolute magnitude (H): 10.30 · 10.4 · 10.42 · 12.0

1049 Gotho, provisional designation 1925 RB, is a carbonaceous asteroid from the outer region of the asteroid belt, approximately 53 kilometers in diameter. It was discovered on 14 September 1925, by German astronomer Karl Reinmuth at Heidelberg Observatory in southwest Germany. Although the name of the asteroid is a masculine German name, it is not known to refer to a particular individual.

== Orbit and classification ==
Gotho orbits the Sun in the outer main-belt at a distance of 2.7–3.5 AU once every 5 years and 5 months (1,987 days). Its orbit has an eccentricity of 0.14 and an inclination of 15° with respect to the ecliptic. First identified as A906 DD at Heidelberg in February 1906, the body's observation arc begins much later at Johannesburg in 1952, or 27 years after its official discovery observation.

== Physical characteristics ==
Gotho has been characterized as a C-type asteroid.

=== Lightcurves ===
In April 2010, a rotational lightcurve of Gotho was obtained by astronomer Kenda Albers at the Oakley Southern Sky Observatory, Australia. Lightcurve analysis gave a rotation period of 8.470 hours with a brightness variation of 0.17 magnitude (U=3-).

=== Diameter and albedo ===
According to the surveys carried out by the Japanese Akari satellite and NASA's Wide-field Infrared Survey Explorer with its subsequent NEOWISE mission, Gotho measures between 53.56 and 56.296 kilometers in diameter and its surface has an albedo between 0.008 and 0.045 (without preliminary results). The Collaborative Asteroid Lightcurve Link derives an albedo of 0.0469 and a diameter of 51.05 kilometers using an absolute magnitude of 10.4.

== Naming ==
For this minor planet, any reference of its name to a person or occurrence is unknown.

=== Unknown meaning ===
Among the many thousands of named minor planets, Gotho is one of 120 asteroids, for which no official naming citation has been published. All of these low-numbered asteroids have numbers between 164 Eva and 1514 Ricouxa and were discovered between 1876 and the 1930s, predominantly by astronomers Auguste Charlois, Johann Palisa, Max Wolf and Karl Reinmuth.
