= 2054 Gawain =

Dark and elongated asteroid from the outer regions of the asteroid belt

Discovery
- Discovered by: C. J. van Houten; I. van Houten-G. T. Gehrels
- Discovery site: Palomar Obs.
- Discovery date: 24 September 1960

Designations
- Named after: Gawain (Arthurian legend)
- Alternative designations: 4097 P-L · 1973 FG_{1}
- Minor planet category: main-belt · (outer)

Orbital characteristics
- Epoch 4 September 2017 (JD 2458000.5)
- Uncertainty parameter 0
- Observation arc: 62.52 yr (22,834 days)
- Aphelion: 3.2591 AU
- Perihelion: 2.6716 AU
- Semi-major axis: 2.9653 AU
- Eccentricity: 0.0991
- Orbital period (sidereal): 5.11 yr (1,865 days)
- Mean anomaly: 315.28°
- Mean motion: 0° 11^{m} 34.8^{s} / day
- Inclination: 3.7886°
- Longitude of ascending node: 293.24°
- Argument of perihelion: 183.97°

Physical characteristics
- Dimensions: 17.28±4.94 km 18.042±0.245 km 19.95 km (derived); 20.05±2.1 km 20.77±0.63 km
- Synodic rotation period: 11.1098±0.0004 h 11.5±0.1 h 11.581±0.0194 h
- Geometric albedo: 0.0444 (derived); 0.06±0.04; 0.068±0.005; 0.0697±0.017; 0.073±0.008
- Spectral type: C
- Absolute magnitude (H): 12.00 · 12.5 · 12.507±0.010 (R) · 12.53±0.34 (R)

2054 Gawain, provisional designation 4097 P-L, is a dark and elongated asteroid from the outer regions of the asteroid belt, approximately 19 kilometers in diameter. Discovered during the Palomar–Leiden survey at Palomar Observatory in 1960, the asteroid was later named after Gawain, a knight of King Arthur's Round Table in the Arthurian legend.

== Discovery ==
Gawain was discovered on 24 September 1960, by Dutch astronomer couple Ingrid and Cornelis van Houten, as well as Dutch–American astronomer Tom Gehrels from images taken at the Palomar Observatory near San Diego, California, in the United States.

=== Palomar–Leiden survey ===
The survey designation "P-L" stands for Palomar–Leiden, named after Palomar Observatory and Leiden Observatory, which collaborated on the fruitful Palomar–Leiden survey in the 1960s. Gehrels used Palomar's Samuel Oschin telescope (also known as the 48-inch Schmidt Telescope), and shipped the photographic plates to Ingrid and Cornelis van Houten at Leiden Observatory where astrometry was carried out. The trio are credited with the discovery of several thousand asteroids.

== Orbit and classification ==
Gawain orbits the Sun in the outer main-belt at a distance of 2.7–3.3 AU once every 5 years and 1 month (1,865 days). Its orbit has an eccentricity of 0.10 and an inclination of 4° with respect to the ecliptic.

The asteroid's observation arc begins 6 years prior to its official discovery observation, with a precovery taken at the discovering Palomar Observatory in July 1954.

== Physical characteristics ==
Gawain is an assumed carbonaceous C-type asteroid.

=== Lightcurves ===
In October 2001, a first rotational lightcurve of Gawain was obtained from photometric observations by an international collaboration of astronomers. Lightcurve analysis gave a rotation period of 11.1098 hours with a high brightness variation of 0.69 magnitude (U=2). Additional lightcurves with a period of 11.581 and 11.5 hours and an amplitude of 0.65 and 1.05, respectively, were obtained by astronomers at the Palomar Transient Factory in California in 2011 and 2013 (U=2). A high brightness amplitude typically indicates that the body has a non-spheroidal shape.

=== Diameter and albedo ===
According to the surveys carried out by the Infrared Astronomical Satellite IRAS, the Japanese Akari satellite, and NASA's Wide-field Infrared Survey Explorer with its subsequent NEOWISE mission, Gawain measures between 17.28 and 20.77 kilometers in diameter and its surface has an albedo between 0.06 and 0.073. The Collaborative Asteroid Lightcurve Link agrees with the results obtained by IRAS, and derives an albedo of 0.0444 and a diameter of 19.95 kilometers based on an absolute magnitude of 12.5.

== Naming ==
This minor planet was named after the figure Gawain, King Arthur's nephew and a Knight of the Round Table in the Arthurian legend. The approved naming citation was published by the Minor Planet Center on 13 October 1981 (M.P.C. 6421).
