= List of named minor planets: B =

This is a partial list of named minor planets, containing all those starting with the letter B, as of 9 November 2026. It is ordered in a case-insensitive, alphabetical manner and contains a total of 1,662 entries. Grey minor planets have no article and redirect to the list of minor planets instead (see List of minor planets § Main index).

== B ==
- 1501 Baade
- 6524 Baalke
- 7164 Babadzhanov
- 9017 Babadzhanyan
- 24118 Babazadeh
- 11341 Babbage
- 10795 Babben
- 3167 Babcock
- 5808 Babelʹ
- 5820 Babelsberg
- 8344 Babette
- 7490 Babička
- 4316 Babinkova
- 202790 Babits
- 541184 Babjak
- 10684 Babkina
- 2059 Baboquivari
- 24948 Babote
- 36060 Babuška
- 15417 Babylon
- 17967 Bacampbell
- 2063 Bacchus
- 108205 Baccipaolo
- 1814 Bach
- 172932 Bachleitner
- 75969 Backhouse
- 856 Backlunda
- 2940 Bacon
- 435950 Bad Königshofen
- 340980 Bad Vilbel
- 159974 Badacsony
- 682621 Badalamenti
- 333 Badenia
- 23164 Badger
- 4866 Badillo
- 13657 Badinter
- 23578 Baedeker
- 26821 Baehr
- 12688 Baekeland
- 13206 Baer
- 4569 Baerbel
- 2513 Baetslé
- 172947 Baeyens
- 10002 Bagdasarian
- 2901 Bagehot
- 10020 Bagenal
- 5136 Baggaley
- 4088 Baggesen
- 7079 Baghdad
- 25648 Baghel
- 34283 Bagley
- 15578 Bagnall
- 9920 Bagnulo
- 7808 Bagould
- 3127 Bagration
- 5533 Bagrov
- 4400 Bagryana
- 25807 Baharshah
- 113949 Bahcall
- 2358 Bahner
- 19434 Bahuffman
- 26640 Bahýľ
- 2776 Baikal
- 2700 Baikonur
- 449922 Bailey
- 1280 Baillauda
- 5353 Baillié
- 3115 Baily
- 25914 Bair
- 25045 Baixuefei
- 1591 Baize
- 5386 Bajaja
- 8315 Bajin
- 265059 Bajorgizi
- 555292 Bakels
- 2549 Baker
- 30136 Bakerfranke
- 30934 Bakerhansen
- 4011 Bakharev
- 3242 Bakhchisaraj
- 11786 Bakhchivandji
- 8782 Bakhrakh
- 269567 Bakhtinov
- 131245 Bakich
- 27425 Bakker
- 160001 Bakonybél
- 136473 Bakosgáspár
- 5681 Bakulev
- 8678 Bäl
- 5315 Balʹmont
- 28700 Balachandar
- 6777 Balakirev
- 24649 Balaklava
- 16116 Balakrishnan
- 3749 Balam
- 34176 Balamurugan
- 27381 Balasingam
- 20821 Balasridhar
- 553078 Balassibálint
- 26634 Balasubramanian
- 2242 Balaton
- 9289 Balau
- 214081 Balavoine
- 114991 Balázs
- 12895 Balbastre
- 48715 Balbinot
- 124104 Balcony
- 4059 Balder
- 274084 Baldone
- 138221 Baldry
- 327982 Balducci
- 1491 Balduinus
- 4831 Baldwin
- 185101 Balearicuni
- 19776 Balears
- 128593 Balfourwhitney
- 770 Bali
- 7331 Balindblad
- 11668 Balios
- 14810 Balistreri
- 457743 Balklavs
- 69596 Balkowski
- 79647 Ballack
- 4808 Ballaero
- 12590 Ballantine
- 11277 Ballard
- 52341 Ballmann
- 12755 Balmer
- 4391 Balodis
- 756832 Balogh
- 6109 Balseiro
- 5610 Balster
- 5870 Baltimore
- 5701 Baltuck
- 18430 Balzac
- 2031 BAM
- 324 Bamberga
- 4490 Bambery
- 15845 Bambi
- 5804 Bambinidipraga
- 16856 Banach
- 1286 Banachiewicza
- 21663 Banat
- 8465 Bancelin
- 1713 Bancilhon
- 10091 Bandaisan
- 79130 Bandanomori
- 9780 Bandersnatch
- 27997 Bandos
- 597 Bandusia
- 17784 Banerjee
- 176710 Banff
- 635057 Bangailona
- 22440 Bangsgaard
- 25864 Banič
- 549229 Bánjános
- 8905 Bankakuko
- 13956 Banks
- 567490 Bánkyvilma
- 155083 Banneker
- 10463 Bannister
- 3394 Banno
- 13198 Banpeiyu
- 24265 Banthonytwarog
- 43293 Banting
- 10453 Banzan
- 298 Baptistina
- 6315 Barabash
- 2883 Barabashov
- 562979 Barabásmiklós
- 40233 Baradeau
- 8954 Baral
- 169568 Baranauskas
- 214487 Baranivka
- 336811 Baratoux
- 93061 Barbagallo
- 234 Barbara
- 7294 Barbaraakey
- 15056 Barbaradixon
- 19982 Barbaradoore
- 319090 Barbarahillary
- 358167 Barbaralong
- 24069 Barbarapener
- 58571 Barbaraserf
- 27584 Barbaravelez
- 63307 Barbarawilson
- 24211 Barbarawood
- 11473 Barbaresco
- 1860 Barbarossa
- 8978 Barbatus
- 10978 Bärbchen
- 6816 Barbcohen
- 85439 Barbero
- 180739 Barbet
- 24065 Barbfriedman
- 12433 Barbieri
- 16251 Barbifrank
- 23055 Barbjewett
- 161835 Barbmcclintock
- 210345 Barbon
- 945 Barcelona
- 379767 Barcis
- 549663 Barczaszabolcs
- 42618 Bardabelias
- 6248 Bardon
- 17062 Bardot
- 1615 Bardwell
- 33330 Barèges
- 7163 Barenboim
- 14505 Barentine
- 22275 Barentsen
- 17803 Barish
- 7868 Barker
- 5781 Barkhatova
- 4524 Barklajdetolli
- 2730 Barks
- 6428 Barlach
- 15466 Barlow
- 281067 Barmby
- 118173 Barmen
- 819 Barnardiana
- 5655 Barney
- 8799 Barnouin
- 8768 Barnowl
- 6590 Barolo
- 7196 Baroni
- 5958 Barrande
- 177866 Barrau
- 19395 Barrera
- 111558 Barrett
- 6695 Barrettduff
- 3693 Barringer
- 1703 Barry
- 311957 Barryalbright
- 215886 Barryarnold
- 20405 Barryburke
- 25273 Barrycarole
- 16076 Barryhaase
- 9139 Barrylasker
- 249044 Barrymarshall
- 19980 Barrysimon
- 16102 Barshannon
- 4204 Barsig
- 212587 Bartašiūtė
- 128065 Bartbenjamin
- 10470 Bartczak
- 17823 Bartels
- 16459 Barth
- 318698 Barthalajos
- 28248 Barthélémy
- 6484 Barthibbs
- 4982 Bartini
- 141496 Bartkevičius
- 2279 Barto
- 4132 Bartók
- 12399 Bartolini
- 149233 Bartolofazio
- 25519 Bartolomeo
- 33480 Bartolucci
- 14948 Bartuška
- 3485 Barucci
- 309704 Baruffetti
- 20011 Baryshnikov
- 78429 Baschek
- 33852 Baschnagel
- 6084 Bascom
- 7573 Basfifty
- 12205 Basharp
- 21937 Basheehan
- 134127 Basher
- 2657 Bashkiria
- 30937 Bashkirtseff
- 26795 Basilashvili
- 2033 Basilea
- 3991 Basilevsky
- 16465 Basilrowe
- 25653 Baskaran
- 4267 Basner
- 19715 Basòdino
- 3599 Basov
- 30936 Basra
- 120074 Bass
- 6460 Bassano
- 49501 Basso
- 26757 Bastei
- 2855 Bastian
- 277883 Basu
- 4318 Baťa
- 20309 Batalden
- 4616 Batalov
- 243097 Batavia
- 23248 Batchelor
- 21399 Bateman
- 10327 Batens
- 2434 Bateson
- 441 Bathilde
- 20526 Bathompson
- 592 Bathseba
- 18581 Batllo
- 11739 Baton Rouge
- 2702 Batrakov
- 8155 Battaglini
- 25958 Battams
- 12828 Batteas
- 3931 Batten
- 11176 Batth
- 18556 Battiato
- 9115 Battisti
- 172 Baucis
- 18611 Baudelaire
- 14400 Baudot
- 28482 Bauerle
- 1553 Bauersfelda
- 8502 Bauhaus
- 151997 Bauhinia
- 11787 Baumanka
- 3683 Baumann
- 17770 Baumé
- 813 Baumeia
- 157640 Baumeler
- 9699 Baumhauer
- 25655 Baupeter
- 11673 Baur
- 2306 Bauschinger
- 11580 Bautzen
- 301 Bavaria
- 20030 Bawtenheimer
- 28165 Bayanmashat
- 23411 Bayanova
- 716260 Baybayan
- 22908 Bayefsky-Anand
- 11946 Bayle
- 752403 Bayurisanto
- 95954 Bayzoltán
- 5304 Bazhenov
- 21038 Bazzano
- 31234 Bea
- 3161 Beadell
- 656 Beagle
- 15413 Beaglehole
- 3314 Beals
- 55108 Beamueller
- 13606 Bean
- 1043 Beate
- 5559 Beategordon
- 381904 Beatita
- 8749 Beatles
- 16226 Beaton
- 3087 Beatrice Tinsley
- 31971 Beatricechoi
- 83 Beatrix
- 13975 Beatrixpotter
- 2925 Beatty
- 134040 Beaubierhaus
- 33274 Beaubingham
- 9161 Beaufort
- 17858 Beaugé
- 9458 Beaumont
- 11385 Beauvoir
- 31647 Beauwigman
- 111571 Bebevio
- 7333 Bec-Borsenberger
- 440670 Bécassine
- 8935 Beccaria
- 782609 Becheș
- 21269 Bechini
- 5024 Bechmann
- 10856 Bechstein
- 24922 Bechtel
- 6074 Bechtereva
- 1349 Bechuana
- 21050 Beck
- 25162 Beckage
- 3522 Becker
- 50723 Beckley
- 31550 Beckmaier
- 3737 Beckman
- 120351 Beckymasterson
- 35419 Beckysmethurst
- 6914 Becquerel
- 4567 Bečvář
- 231470 Bedding
- 133066 Beddingfield
- 3691 Bede
- 16672 Bedini
- 20220 Beebe
- 15092 Beegees
- 1896 Beer
- 5241 Beeson
- 4026 Beet
- 1815 Beethoven
- 12149 Begas
- 5665 Begemann
- 286163 Begeni
- 943 Begonia
- 68325 Begues
- 8009 Béguin
- 17102 Begzhigitova
- 12145 Behaim
- 30159 Behari
- 3278 Běhounek
- 1651 Behrens
- 65685 Behring
- 23457 Beiderbecke
- 6718 Beiglböck
- 59000 Beiguan
- 90830 Beihang
- 23408 Beijingaoyun
- 7072 Beijingdaxue
- 9442 Beiligong
- 1474 Beira
- 26488 Beiser
- 95982 Beish
- 8050 Beishida
- 31065 Beishizhang
- 342620 Beita
- 101810 Beiyou
- 13258 Bej
- 251014 Bejczyantal
- 25656 Bejnood
- 21503 Beksha
- 20221 Bektešević
- 232306 Bekuška
- 19678 Belczyk
- 783560 Beldea
- 11284 Belenus
- 28437 Belényu
- 597993 Bélesta
- 14669 Beletic
- 14790 Beletskij
- 1052 Belgica
- 5110 Belgirate
- 9612 Belgorod
- 2808 Belgrano
- 3747 Belinskij
- 178 Belisana
- 1074 Beljawskya
- 22276 Belkin
- 179595 Belkovich
- 695 Bella
- 333138 Bellabrodbeck
- 79271 Bellagio
- 333056 Bellamy
- 271235 Bellay
- 363504 Belleau
- 318676 Bellelay
- 1808 Bellerophon
- 9604 Bellevanzuylen
- 18148 Bellier
- 3659 Bellingshausen
- 18509 Bellini
- 6445 Bellmore
- 32381 Bellomo
- 28 Bellona
- 48844 Belloves
- 11069 Bellqvist
- 2626 Belnika
- 10770 Belo Horizonte
- 1004 Belopolskya
- 34552 Belousova
- 24426 Belova
- 214432 Belprahon
- 8786 Belskaya
- 30350 Beltecas
- 3498 Belton
- 12442 Beltramemass
- 15620 Beltrami
- 2368 Beltrovata
- 2030 Belyaev
- 8448 Belyakina
- 58417 Belzoni
- 2863 Ben Mayer
- 15897 Beňačková
- 51023 Benavidezlozano
- 11764 Benbaillaud
- 20532 Benbilby
- 11219 Benbohn
- 256797 Benbow
- 21508 Benbrewer
- 14631 Benbryan
- 35229 Benckert
- 14702 Benclark
- 734 Benda
- 4684 Bendjoya
- 92578 Benecchi
- 631626 Benedektibor
- 15853 Benedettafoglia
- 5346 Benedetti
- 27158 Benedetti-Rossi
- 6579 Benedix
- 12655 Benferinga
- 5102 Benfranklin
- 30025 Benfreed
- 19416 Benglass
- 1846 Bengt
- 1784 Benguella
- 41671 Benhardesty
- 31435 Benhauck
- 175282 Benhida
- 23277 Benhughes
- 21662 Benigni
- 45737 Benita
- 82361 Benitoloyola
- 25992 Benjamensun
- 976 Benjamina
- 18198 Benjaminbryan
- 178113 Benjamindilday
- 24138 Benjaminlu
- 29463 Benjaminpeirce
- 23861 Benjaminsong
- 15565 Benjaminsteele
- 31934 Benjamintan
- 24146 Benjamueller
- 133892 Benkhaldoun
- 13332 Benkhoff
- 863 Benkoela
- 28103 Benmcpheron
- 9012 Benner
- 8842 Bennetmcinnes
- 4093 Bennett
- 20127 Benning
- 101955 Bennu
- 8467 Benoîtcarry
- 12578 Bensaur
- 20222 Benseguane
- 32191 Bensharkey
- 301394 Bensheim
- 16230 Benson
- 358675 Bente
- 5293 Bentengahama
- 34372 Bentleysiems
- 28601 Benton
- 5419 Benua
- 24985 Benuri
- 25113 Benwasserman
- 8069 Benweiss
- 7967 Beny
- 6734 Benzenberg
- 1517 Beograd
- 38086 Beowulf
- 10387 Bepicolombo
- 27967 Beppebianchi
- 70179 Beppechiara
- 7935 Beppefenoglio
- 6876 Beppeforti
- 11197 Beranek
- 776 Berbericia
- 553438 Bércziszaniszló
- 4184 Berdyayev
- 159181 Berdychiv
- 6319 Beregovoj
- 2998 Berendeya
- 653 Berenike
- 5694 Berényi
- 731678 Berényróbert
- 5682 Beresford
- 27050 Beresheet
- 10673 Berezhnoy
- 7950 Berezov
- 4528 Berg
- 611585 Bergbusch
- 12709 Bergen op Zoom
- 221516 Bergen-Enkheim
- 7280 Bergengruen
- 12729 Berger
- 124114 Bergersen
- 12591 Bergey
- 3093 Bergholz
- 14596 Bergstralh
- 8695 Bergvall
- 184779 Bericoberheim
- 34837 Berilsaygin
- 716 Berkeley
- 27657 Berkhey
- 3604 Berkhuijsen
- 95179 Berkó
- 25657 Berkowitz
- 30717 Berkowski
- 4359 Berlage
- 140602 Berlind
- 69288 Berlioz
- 25158 Berman
- 114239 Bermarmi
- 1313 Berna
- 107393 Bernacca
- 10144 Bernardbigot
- 6196 Bernardbowen
- 18236 Bernardburke
- 59211 Bernardfort
- 103733 Bernardharris
- 27983 Bernardi
- 629 Bernardina
- 20221 Bernardinelli
- 52703 Bernardleblanc
- 8079 Bernardlovell
- 87933 Bernardschmitt
- 31936 Bernardsmit
- 156880 Bernardtregon
- 3266 Bernardus
- 238129 Bernardwolfe
- 7848 Bernasconi
- 191494 Berndkoch
- 247553 Berndpauli
- 16051 Bernero
- 13926 Berners-Lee
- 21505 Bernert
- 3038 Bernes
- 2643 Bernhard
- 748569 Bernhardhäusler
- 3467 Bernheim
- 8437 Bernicla
- 7149 Bernie
- 5305 Bernievolz
- 14498 Bernini
- 13916 Bernolák
- 2034 Bernoulli
- 25365 Bernreuter
- 21114 Bernson
- 4476 Bernstein
- 422 Berolina
- 4702 Berounka
- 24829 Berounurbi
- 25331 Berrevoets
- 7918 Berrilli
- 3684 Berry
- 13416 Berryman
- 29873 Bertachini
- 4603 Bertaud
- 8266 Bertelli
- 606875 Bertgrice
- 154 Bertha
- 15905 Berthier
- 420 Bertholda
- 12750 Berthollet
- 688696 Bertiau
- 8698 Bertilpettersson
- 16002 Bertin
- 46392 Bertola
- 15908 Bertoni
- 11102 Bertorighini
- 97448 Bertorosco
- 320260 Bertout
- 85320 Bertram
- 161371 Bertrandou
- 13053 Bertrandrussell
- 10067 Bertuch
- 3179 Beruti
- 10380 Berwald
- 1729 Beryl
- 13109 Berzelius
- 236307 Berzsenyi
- 40201 Besely
- 28690 Beshellem
- 196807 Beshore
- 16953 Besicovitch
- 46610 Bésixdouze
- 6374 Beslan
- 30411 Besse
- 1552 Bessel
- 154938 Besserman
- 150129 Besshi
- 11446 Betankur
- 23814 Bethanylynne
- 19619 Bethbell
- 222403 Bethchristie
- 21513 Bethcochran
- 30828 Bethe
- 7994 Bethellen
- 6856 Bethemmons
- 246837 Bethfabinsky
- 937 Bethgea
- 28676 Bethkoester
- 29730 Bethwestfall
- 174362 Bethwillman
- 42924 Betlem
- 90892 Betlémská kaple
- 21506 Betsill
- 19787 Betsyglass
- 18785 Betsywelsh
- 7329 Bettadotto
- 7141 Bettarini
- 17076 Betti
- 184784 Bettiepage
- 250 Bettina
- 33463 Bettinagregg
- 31091 Bettiventicinque
- 677772 Bettonvil
- 12159 Bettybiegel
- 378204 Bettyhesser
- 21679 Bettypalermiti
- 84991 Bettyphilpotts
- 20026 Bettyrobinson
- 113673 Bettystrickland
- 8644 Betulapendula
- 1580 Betulia
- 53250 Beucher
- 8127 Beuf
- 32217 Beverlyge
- 14953 Bevilacqua
- 34288 Bevindaglen
- 21349 Bevoke
- 10325 Bexa
- 1611 Beyer
- 23199 Bezdek
- 375176 Béziau
- 17285 Bezout
- 1963 Bezovec
- 3096 Bezruč
- 12686 Bezuglyj
- 21351 Bhagwat
- 5849 Bhanji
- 15976 Bhansali
- 78118 Bharat
- 21507 Bhasin
- 13259 Bhat
- 17141 Bhatia
- 15985 Bhatnagar
- 8348 Bhattacharyya
- 31637 Bhimaraju
- 28842 Bhowmik
- 26518 Bhuiyan
- 28553 Bhupatiraju
- 24850 Biagiomarin
- 318723 Bialas
- 31952 Bialtdecelie
- 19981 Bialystock
- 218 Bianca
- 42775 Bianchini
- 55418 Bianciardi
- 34125 Biancospino
- 6742 Biandepei
- 4821 Bianucci
- 1146 Biarmia
- 8771 Biarmicus
- 38050 Bias
- 11206 Bibee
- 73767 Bibiandersson
- 28795 Bibles
- 51895 Biblialexa
- 30722 Biblioran
- 205424 Bibracte
- 18113 Bibring
- 55844 Bičák
- 250606 Bichat
- 4324 Bickel
- 4837 Bickerton
- 4620 Bickley
- 32014 Bida
- 9398 Bidelman
- 3246 Bidstrup
- 2281 Biela
- 59122 Bienaymé
- 54598 Bienor
- 73640 Biermann
- 10218 Bierstadt
- 38830 Biets
- 10442 Biezenzo
- 5683 Bifukumonin
- 69263 Big Ben
- 180940 Bighornfire
- 8850 Bignonia
- 4460 Bihoro
- 7928 Bijaoui
- 20331 Bijemarks
- 5372 Bikki
- 185554 Bikushev
- 23166 Bilal
- 2991 Bilbo
- 12162 Bilderdijk
- 549650 Bilibin
- 20061 Bilitza
- 4425 Bilk
- 585 Bilkis
- 25943 Billahearn
- 10967 Billallen
- 228136 Billary
- 4175 Billbaum
- 11675 Billboyle
- 9930 Billburrows
- 21531 Billcollin
- 15058 Billcooke
- 27284 Billdunbar
- 6007 Billevans
- 15846 Billfyfe
- 21350 Billgardner
- 20234 Billgibson
- 8457 Billgolisch
- 15964 Billgray
- 79896 Billhaley
- 9116 Billhamilton
- 15849 Billharper
- 329200 Billhicks
- 11216 Billhubbard
- 73703 Billings
- 4322 Billjackson
- 11511 Billknopf
- 120299 Billlynch
- 80808 Billmason
- 9526 Billmckinnon
- 4838 Billmclaughlin
- 7607 Billmerline
- 19695 Billnye
- 8537 Billochbull
- 6135 Billowen
- 5738 Billpickering
- 8630 Billprady
- 11017 Billputnam
- 21148 Billramsey
- 21821 Billryan
- 5630 Billschaefer
- 63032 Billschmitt
- 91275 Billsmith
- 242321 Billtilden
- 7812 Billward
- 34816 Billybarr
- 719840 Bilsemdüzce
- 85217 Bilzingsleben
- 20249 Bincheng
- 92279 Bindiluca
- 213629 Binford
- 28341 Bingaman
- 8291 Bingham
- 30279 Binnie
- 216390 Binnig
- 28958 Binns
- 19998 Binoche
- 2029 Binomi
- 723218 Binsted
- 9723 Binyang
- 2873 Binzel
- 3924 Birch
- 960 Birgit
- 85190 Birgitroth
- 2744 Birgitta
- 16674 Birkeland
- 23450 Birkenstock
- 202686 Birkfellner
- 15896 Birkhoff
- 4803 Birkle
- 10034 Birlan
- 365130 Birnfeld
- 327512 Bíró
- 555128 Birštonas
- 65100 Birtwhistle
- 212977 Birutė
- 2477 Biryukov
- 288959 Biržai
- 32808 Bischoff
- 17286 Bisei
- 2633 Bishop
- 269485 Bisikalo
- 7586 Bismarck
- 12934 Bisque
- 34330 Bissoondial
- 14492 Bistar
- 2038 Bistro
- 5120 Bitias
- 5299 Bittesini
- 6596 Bittner
- 26969 Biver
- 5797 Bivoj
- 4289 Biwako
- 13241 Biyo
- 9943 Bizan
- 343134 Bizet
- 114022 Bizyaev
- 12663 Björkegren
- 2145 Blaauw
- 11207 Black
- 33550 Blackburn
- 10652 Blaeu
- 4891 Blaga
- 22442 Blaha
- 213772 Blaheta
- 376029 Blahová
- 121659 Blairrussell
- 4069 Blakee
- 33392 Blakehord
- 28207 Blakesmith
- 453715 Blakesullivan
- 20230 Blanchard
- 4478 Blanco
- 7498 Blaník
- 100732 Blankavalois
- 13841 Blankenship
- 47294 Blanský les
- 140980 Blanton
- 2320 Blarney
- 17637 Blaschke
- 117406 Blasgámez
- 126315 Bláthy
- 2445 Blazhko
- 9693 Bleeker
- 15406 Bleibtreu
- 97637 Blennert
- 11248 Blériot
- 92891 Bless
- 11582 Bleuler
- 99262 Bleustein
- 22927 Blewett
- 3263 Bligh
- 5572 Bliskunov
- 3318 Blixen
- 10447 Bloembergen
- 2540 Blok
- 13231 Blondelet
- 134034 Bloomenthal
- 333054 Bloomquist
- 397279 Bloomsburg
- 16887 Blouke
- 19582 Blow
- 23061 Blueglass
- 16197 Bluepeter
- 92894 Bluford
- 333120 Blum
- 352646 Blumbahs
- 18106 Blume
- 38048 Blumenbach
- 21414 Blumenthal
- 10857 Blüthner
- 55755 Blythe
- 646684 Boaca
- 8925 Boattini
- 42246 Bobanderson
- 5871 Bobbell
- 30374 Bobbiehinson
- 6708 Bobbievaile
- 24249 Bobbiolson
- 161661 Bobbyclarke
- 19577 Bobbyfisher
- 5642 Bobbywilliams
- 21360 Bobduff
- 337044 Bobdylan
- 13562 Bobeggleton
- 54411 Bobestelle
- 10498 Bobgent
- 12014 Bobhawkes
- 147397 Bobhazel
- 2829 Bobhope
- 228409 Bobjensen
- 7159 Bobjoseph
- 63305 Bobkepple
- 37859 Bobkoff
- 271216 Boblambert
- 170909 Bobmasterson
- 332324 Bobmcdonald
- 43657 Bobmiller
- 651104 Bobola
- 2507 Bobone
- 28802 Boborino
- 13413 Bobpeterson
- 381725 Bobrinsky
- 6641 Bobross
- 18321 Bobrov
- 2637 Bobrovnikoff
- 128027 Bobsandy
- 27571 Bobscott
- 159778 Bobshelton
- 5549 Bobstefanik
- 39890 Bobstephens
- 27279 Boburan
- 6181 Bobweber
- 13423 Bobwoolley
- 27968 Bobylapointe
- 5227 Bocacara
- 27098 Bocarsly
- 19149 Boccaccio
- 31015 Boccardi
- 31476 Bocconcelli
- 141414 Bochanski
- 35429 Bochartdesaron
- 19915 Bochkarev
- 17653 Bochner
- 15053 Bochníček
- 414026 Bochonko
- 15710 Böcklin
- 34808 Bocosur
- 1487 Boda
- 998 Bodea
- 152559 Bodelschwingh
- 6528 Boden
- 266286 Bodenmüller
- 22322 Bodensee
- 10033 Bodewits
- 3459 Bodil
- 210939 Bödök
- 31639 Bodoni
- 3458 Boduognat
- 29483 Boeker
- 8175 Boerhaave
- 7804 Boesgaard
- 6617 Boethius
- 4269 Bogado
- 3839 Bogaevskij
- 25609 Bogantes
- 4794 Bogard
- 6784 Bogatikov
- 12680 Bogdanovich
- 269252 Bogdanstupka
- 15495 Bogie
- 22616 Bogolyubov
- 3885 Bogorodskij
- 3710 Bogoslovskij
- 12325 Bogota
- 4275 Bogustafson
- 371 Bohemia
- 292051 Bohlender
- 720 Bohlinia
- 1141 Bohmia
- 15938 Bohnenblust
- 30255 Bohner
- 8010 Böhnhardt
- 3948 Bohr
- 1635 Bohrmann
- 9008 Bohšternberk
- 6301 Bohumilruprecht
- 7897 Bohuška
- 34666 Bohyunsan
- 330634 Boico
- 354659 Boileau
- 350969 Boiohaemum
- 251485 Bois-d'Amont
- 27047 Boisvert
- 6685 Boitsov
- 179874 Bojanvršnak
- 1654 Bojeva
- 1983 Bok
- 2338 Bokhan
- 25658 Bokor
- 3205 Boksenberg
- 9434 Bokusen
- 8367 Bokusui
- 21852 Bolander
- 792121 Boldea
- 97508 Bolden
- 541185 Boldogkői
- 353817 Bolduc-Duval
- 13267 Bolechowski
- 617403 Boley
- 42177 Bolin
- 712 Boliviana
- 7873 Böll
- 34625 Bollimpalli
- 2601 Bologna
- 7858 Bolotov
- 17821 Bölsche
- 26793 Bolshoi
- 8785 Boltwood
- 24712 Boltzmann
- 1441 Bolyai
- 2622 Bolzano
- 23404 Bomans
- 17696 Bombelli
- 12834 Bomben
- 17703 Bombieri
- 100519 Bombig
- 37734 Bonacina
- 41927 Bonal
- 28772 Bonamico
- 49987 Bonata
- 8742 Bonazzoli
- 12657 Bonch-Bruevich
- 11981 Boncompagni
- 13693 Bondar
- 767 Bondia
- 3129 Bonestell
- 20366 Bonev
- 545167 Bonfini
- 20590 Bongiovanni
- 13766 Bonham
- 7256 Bonhoeffer
- 316080 Boni
- 15346 Bonifatius
- 16804 Bonini
- 14965 Bonk
- 283117 Bonn
- 234923 Bonnell
- 5947 Bonnie
- 27126 Bonnielei
- 33217 Bonnybasu
- 361 Bononia
- 9587 Bonpland
- 1477 Bonsdorffia
- 10654 Bontekoe
- 31953 Bontha
- 36036 Bonucci
- 10028 Bonus
- 17734 Boole
- 13825 Booth
- 7086 Bopp
- 88292 Bora-Bora
- 66652 Borasisi
- 178156 Borbála
- 13684 Borbona
- 39540 Borchert
- 175726 Borda
- 11225 Borden
- 9262 Bordovitsyna
- 1916 Boreas
- 16065 Borel
- 11510 Borges
- 25230 Borgis
- 95219 Borgman
- 44717 Borgoamozzano
- 264033 Boris-Mikhail
- 19855 Borisalexeev
- 20840 Borishanin
- 6284 Borisivanov
- 11016 Borisov
- 18295 Borispetrov
- 20077 Borispodolsky
- 9148 Boriszaitsev
- 13085 Borlaug
- 26197 Bormio
- 13954 Born
- 3859 Börngen
- 4453 Bornholm
- 264131 Bornim
- 3075 Bornmann
- 6780 Borodin
- 3544 Borodino
- 142752 Boroski
- 38454 Boroson
- 5858 Borovitskia
- 2706 Borovský
- 1539 Borrelly
- 351976 Borromini
- 210290 Borsellino
- 4673 Bortle
- 7864 Borucki
- 545565 Borysten
- 6923 Borzacchini
- 167341 Börzsöny
- 7414 Bosch
- 17056 Boschetti
- 14361 Boscovich
- 10411 Boshuren
- 25358 Boskovice
- 176532 Boskri
- 73520 Boslough
- 16777 Bosma
- 3296 Bosque Alegre
- 13583 Bosret
- 16234 Bosse
- 219067 Bossuet
- 58221 Boston
- 25108 Boström
- 91213 Botchan
- 31479 Botello
- 588108 Boteropop
- 1354 Botha
- 11228 Botnick
- 741 Botolphia
- 82638 Bottariclaudio
- 5194 Böttger
- 29361 Botticelli
- 29508 Bottinelli
- 7355 Bottke
- 2337 Boubín
- 4313 Bouchet
- 11552 Boucolion
- 33861 Boucvalt
- 23403 Boudewijnbüch
- 7649 Bougainville
- 12897 Bougeret
- 8190 Bouguer
- 8523 Bouillabaisse
- 8521 Boulainvilliers
- 7346 Boulanger
- 8489 Boulder
- 275786 Bouley
- 23158 Bouligny
- 9706 Bouma
- 3264 Bounty
- 303546 Bourbaki
- 372305 Bourdeille
- 31563 Bourdelledemicas
- 13674 Bourge
- 340929 Bourgelat
- 1543 Bourgeois
- 6207 Bourvil
- 3435 Boury
- 13390 Bouška
- 859 Bouzaréah
- 18551 Bovet
- 2246 Bowell
- 3363 Bowen
- 88878 Bowenyueli
- 1639 Bower
- 333057 Bowles
- 2996 Bowman
- 58714 Boya
- 3681 Boyan
- 2563 Boyarchuk
- 2611 Boyce
- 333614 Boyd
- 4301 Boyden
- 1215 Boyer
- 16016 Boylan
- 11967 Boyle
- 5345 Boynton
- 12270 Bozar
- 7699 Božek
- 20534 Bozeman
- 7382 Bozhenkova
- 3628 Božněmcová
- 1342 Brabantia
- 26647 Brabham
- 10645 Brač
- 84118 Bracalicioci
- 10392 Brace
- 9954 Brachiosaurus
- 8433 Brachyrhynchus
- 11666 Bracker
- 12775 Brackett
- 9766 Bradbury
- 11170 Bradenmilford
- 3430 Bradfield
- 28669 Bradhelsel
- 2383 Bradley
- 29805 Bradleysloop
- 2472 Bradman
- 29132 Bradpitt
- 8223 Bradshaw
- 8553 Bradsmith
- 5826 Bradstreet
- 35283 Bradtimerson
- 129969 Bradwilliams
- 5251 Bradwood
- 7691 Brady
- 46925 Bradyharan
- 27383 Braebenedict
- 3877 Braes
- 729512 Braga
- 10999 Braga-Ribas
- 4884 Bragaria
- 4572 Brage
- 15309 Bragée
- 11150 Bragg
- 3488 Brahic
- 1818 Brahms
- 9843 Braidwood
- 9969 Braille
- 99928 Brainard
- 134150 Bralower
- 12147 Bramante
- 640 Brambilla
- 6429 Brâncuși
- 33838 Brandabaker
- 129201 Brandenallen
- 6068 Brandenburg
- 1168 Brandia
- 30271 Brandoncui
- 18197 Brandondotson
- 16067 Brandonfan
- 15020 Brandonimber
- 26504 Brandonli
- 33606 Brandonmuncan
- 170910 Brandonsanderson
- 23855 Brandonshih
- 25783 Brandontyler
- 23295 Brandoreavis
- 8831 Brändström
- 3503 Brandt
- 606 Brangäne
- 4140 Branham
- 115477 Brantanica
- 25226 Brasch
- 31605 Braschi
- 5502 Brashear
- 15453 Brasileirinhos
- 293 Brasilia
- 6587 Brassens
- 7887 Bratfest
- 3372 Bratijchuk
- 4018 Bratislava
- 6748 Bratton
- 18119 Braude
- 25497 Brauerman
- 1411 Brauna
- 5583 Braunerová
- 31957 Braunstein
- 5182 Bray
- 17001 Braydennoh
- 32571 Brayton
- 11369 Brazelton
- 63387 Brazos Bend
- 31462 Brchnelova
- 4242 Brecher
- 12298 Brecht
- 12710 Breda
- 18773 Bredehoft
- 786 Bredichina
- 16915 Bredthauer
- 18398 Bregenz
- 7054 Brehm
- 10980 Breimer
- 316039 Breizh
- 3918 Brel
- 6320 Bremen
- 1609 Brenda
- 34300 Brendafrost
- 75841 Brendahuettner
- 3824 Brendalee
- 21854 Brendandwyer
- 761 Brendelia
- 74439 Brenden
- 152472 Brendlé
- 58679 Brenig
- 16053 Brennan
- 33556 Brennanclark
- 28750 Brennawallin
- 333166 Brennen
- 8054 Brentano
- 120208 Brentbarbee
- 120285 Brentbos
- 11180 Brentperlman
- 6837 Bressi
- 14977 Bressler
- 1211 Bressole
- 3232 Brest
- 3937 Bretagnon
- 236463 Bretécher
- 20839 Bretharrison
- 6179 Brett
- 27426 Brettlawrie
- 71485 Brettman
- 134088 Brettperkins
- 26613 Brettwhite
- 177771 Bretz
- 11583 Breuer
- 38642 Breukers
- 11678 Brevard
- 6117 Brevardastro
- 9468 Brewer
- 5799 Brewington
- 10315 Brewster
- 4192 Breysacher
- 2683 Brian
- 24344 Brianbarnett
- 136922 Brianbauer
- 17885 Brianbeyt
- 121536 Brianburt
- 25515 Briancarey
- 12592 Brianchen
- 15783 Briancox
- 55559 Briancraine
- 28657 Briandempsey
- 223278 Brianduncan
- 76818 Brianenke
- 17211 Brianfisher
- 12562 Briangrazer
- 33561 Brianjasondu
- 45689 Brianjones
- 231832 Briankeeney
- 11723 Briankennedy
- 22057 Brianking
- 176867 Brianlee
- 22650 Brianloader
- 12926 Brianmason
- 52665 Brianmay
- 24139 Brianmcarthy
- 22869 Brianmcfar
- 128343 Brianpage
- 24927 Brianpalmer
- 23296 Brianreavis
- 19442 Brianrice
- 233292 Brianschmidt
- 20219 Brianstone
- 11374 Briantaylor
- 18125 Brianwilson
- 17238 Brianwu
- 32092 Brianxia
- 7199 Brianza
- 7714 Briccialdi
- 30296 Bricehuang
- 4029 Bridges
- 120372 Bridgetburns
- 31580 Bridgetoei
- 325588 Bridžius
- 19029 Briede
- 142753 Briegel
- 21548 Briekugler
- 4209 Briggs
- 128895 Bright Spring
- 8849 Brighton
- 20584 Brigidsavage
- 450 Brigitta
- 312627 Brigitteyagüe
- 287432 Bril
- 22938 Brilawrence
- 5277 Brisbane
- 655 Briseïs
- 1071 Brita
- 4522 Britastra
- 17902 Britbaker
- 134109 Britneyburch
- 24413 Britneyschmidt
- 1219 Britta
- 20772 Brittajones
- 51599 Brittany
- 15126 Brittanyanderson
- 333096 Brittanyenos
- 4079 Britten
- 17810 Brittholden
- 13270 Brittonbounds
- 22545 Brittrusso
- 25333 Britwenger
- 521 Brixia
- 55874 Brlka
- 152750 Brloh
- 2889 Brno
- 10128 Bro
- 340479 Broca
- 33269 Broccoli
- 95793 Brock
- 4724 Brocken
- 27765 Brockhaus
- 22913 Brockman
- 25125 Brodallan
- 294295 Brodardmarc
- 236800 Broder
- 18766 Broderick
- 17965 Brodersen
- 23401 Brodskaya
- 9974 Brody
- 562936 Bródyimre
- 559717 Bródyjános
- 1879 Broederstroom
- 18542 Broglio
- 6769 Brokoff
- 27491 Broksas
- 4575 Broman
- 1315 Bronislawa
- 16119 Bronner
- 3385 Bronnina
- 7002 Bronshten
- 10082 Bronson
- 9949 Brontosaurus
- 11229 Brookebowers
- 27062 Brookeminer
- 2773 Brooks
- 31897 Brooksdasilva
- 31122 Brooktaylor
- 8800 Brophy
- 3309 Brorfelde
- 3979 Brorsen
- 3144 Brosche
- 434180 Brosens
- 24105 Broughton
- 33027 Brouillac
- 35683 Broumov
- 1746 Brouwer
- 1643 Brown
- 25851 Browning
- 3259 Brownlee
- 16244 Brož
- 7295 Brozović
- 5079 Brubeck
- 21430 Brubrew
- 4203 Brucato
- 2430 Bruce Helin
- 11679 Brucebaker
- 14332 Brucebarnett
- 300221 Brucebills
- 28364 Bruceelmegreen
- 86279 Brucegary
- 5262 Brucegoldberg
- 9127 Brucekoehn
- 27172 Brucekosaveach
- 34789 Brucemckean
- 4957 Brucemurray
- 29843 Brucesoper
- 90449 Brucestephenson
- 9660 Brucewillis
- 5004 Bruch
- 455 Bruchsalia
- 323 Brucia
- 10737 Brück
- 3955 Bruckner
- 32109 Brucksyal
- 9664 Brueghel
- 9472 Bruges
- 42492 Brüggenthies
- 16598 Brugmansia
- 5127 Bruhns
- 4916 Brumberg
- 290 Bruna
- 491984 Brunapontes
- 79354 Brundibár
- 6055 Brunelleschi
- 72819 Brunet
- 8253 Brunetto
- 18974 Brungardt
- 123 Brunhild
- 11538 Brunico
- 10943 Brunier
- 5758 Brunini
- 2499 Brunk
- 142754 Brunner
- 33869 Brunnermatt
- 6807 Brünnow
- 132668 Brunobozzetto
- 68947 Brunofunk
- 199900 Brunoganz
- 1570 Brunonia
- 17649 Brunorossi
- 16590 Brunowalter
- 4687 Brunsandrej
- 901 Brunsia
- 159629 Brunszvik
- 1811 Bruwer
- 2689 Bruxelles
- 28051 Bruzzone
- 2488 Bryan
- 34179 Bryanchun
- 28825 Bryangoehring
- 27108 Bryanhe
- 22157 Bryanhoran
- 34569 Bryanlim
- 518523 Bryanshumaker
- 31688 Bryantliu
- 4591 Bryantsev
- 49272 Bryce Canyon
- 19599 Brycemelton
- 18704 Brychristian
- 79117 Brydonejack
- 133280 Bryleen
- 19563 Brzezinska
- 25613 Bubenicek
- 16355 Buber
- 243458 Bubulina
- 235999 Bucciantini
- 3141 Buchar
- 15465 Buchroeder
- 3209 Buchwald
- 27532 Buchwald-Wright
- 333157 Buck
- 12583 Buckjean
- 20084 Buckmaster
- 8829 Buczkowski
- 8166 Buczynski
- 908 Buda
- 179875 Budavari
- 16155 Buddy
- 15392 Budějický
- 47851 Budine
- 103740 Budinger
- 28854 Budisteanu
- 2524 Budovicium
- 63605 Budperry
- 338 Budrosa
- 10042 Budstewart
- 7850 Buenos Aires
- 7420 Buffon
- 544618 Bugátpál
- 301946 Bugyi
- 17983 Buhrmester
- 7553 Buie
- 6820 Buil
- 28853 Bukhamsin
- 575511 Bükk
- 13734 Buklad
- 12409 Bukovanská
- 594012 Bulavina
- 3469 Bulgakov
- 2575 Bulgaria
- 78453 Bullock
- 16062 Buncher
- 20058 Bundalian
- 31095 Buneiou
- 56095 Buniatishvili
- 6722 Bunichi
- 3890 Bunin
- 11292 Bunjisuzuki
- 2283 Bunke
- 10361 Bunsen
- 19243 Bunting
- 244888 Bunton
- 268669 Bunun
- 73465 Buonanno
- 17891 Buraliforti
- 90502 Buratti
- 5490 Burbidge
- 5159 Burbine
- 28855 Burchell
- 27509 Burcher
- 3447 Burckhalter
- 20250 Burdanov
- 6754 Burdenko
- 3583 Burdett
- 384 Burdigala
- 12414 Bure
- 198634 Burgaymarta
- 10100 Bürgel
- 2481 Bürgi
- 17138 Burgosrosario
- 19543 Burgoyne
- 374 Burgundia
- 7867 Burian
- 14570 Burkam
- 4874 Burke
- 875150 Burkegaffneyobs
- 267003 Burkert
- 4549 Burkhardt
- 9143 Burkhead
- 4719 Burnaby
- 4427 Burnashev
- 5798 Burnett
- 6235 Burney
- 834 Burnhamia
- 16120 Burnim
- 2708 Burns
- 8612 Burov
- 16121 Burrell
- 21811 Burroughs
- 8681 Burs
- 6078 Burt
- 5340 Burton
- 6610 Burwitz
- 2593 Buryatia
- 34599 Burzinbalsara
- 3254 Bus
- 7121 Busch
- 23232 Buschur
- 23753 Busdicker
- 30436 Busemann
- 367406 Buser
- 20658 Bushmarinov
- 55320 Busler
- 14380 Bussey
- 2490 Bussolini
- 28474 Bustamante
- 5196 Bustelli
- 20524 Bustersikes
- 21418 Bustos
- 4936 Butakov
- 125592 Buthiers
- 13543 Butler
- 13049 Butov
- 9094 Butsuen
- 18167 Buttani
- 16702 Buxner
- 4344 Buxtehude
- 8852 Buxus
- 375007 Buxy
- 10961 Buysballot
- 14318 Buzinov
- 16198 Búzios
- 6517 Buzzi
- 22724 Byatt
- 199 Byblis
- 16783 Bychkov
- 2661 Bydžovský
- 2170 Byelorussia
- 297082 Bygott
- 4682 Bykov
- 3505 Byrd
- 3306 Byron
- 90226 Byronsmith
- 33421 Byronxu
- 6180 Bystritskaya
back to top

== See also ==
- List of minor planet discoverers
- List of observatory codes
- Meanings of minor planet names § Index
