= 1866 Sisyphus =

Largest Apollo asteroid

Discovery
- Discovered by: P. Wild
- Discovery site: Zimmerwald Obs.
- Discovery date: 5 December 1972

Designations
- Pronunciation: /ˈsɪsəfəs/
- Named after: Σίσυφος Sīsyphos (Greek mythology)
- Alternative designations: 1972 XA
- Minor planet category: Apollo; NEO; Mars-crosser
- Adjectives: Sysiphean /sɪsəˈfiːən/, Sisyphian /sɪˈsɪfiən/

Orbital characteristics
- Epoch 4 September 2017 (JD 2458000.5)
- Uncertainty parameter 0
- Observation arc: 61.55 yr (22,482 days)
- Earliest precovery date: 26 January 1955
- Aphelion: 2.913 AU (435.8 Gm)
- Perihelion: 0.8747312 AU (130.85792 Gm)
- Semi-major axis: 1.8936992 AU (283.29337 Gm)
- Eccentricity: 0.5386
- Orbital period (sidereal): 2.61 yr (952 days)
- Mean anomaly: 85.918°
- Mean motion: 0° 22^{m} 41.88^{s} / day
- Inclination: 41.202°
- Longitude of ascending node: 63.498°
- Argument of perihelion: 293.09°
- Known satellites: 1 (Note: Benner (1985), gives a diameter of 8 kilometer. Summary figures listed at LCDB) (Orbital period of 27.16±0.05 h)
- Earth MOID: 0.1045 AU (40.7 LD; 15.63 Gm)
- Mars MOID: 0.1291 AU (19.31 Gm)

Physical characteristics
- Dimensions: 5.72±0.07 km; 6.597±0.189 km; 6.859 km; 6.86 km (taken); 8 km; 8.48 km; 8.9 km
- Synodic rotation period: 2.3909±0.0004 h; 2.400 h; 2.4 h (Note: Pravec (1998web), gives a rotation period of 2.4 hours. Summary figures listed at LCDB); 2.401±0.001 h; 2.424±0.001 h; 2.7 h
- Geometric albedo: 0.14; 0.15; 0.19±0.07; 0.255±0.049; 0.360±0.010; 0.3719
- Spectral type: SMASS = S; S
- Apparent magnitude: 9.0 (discovery) 9.3 (2071 close approach)
- Absolute magnitude (H): 11.7±0.2 (R); 12.4; 12.51±0.149; 13.0

1866 Sisyphus is a binary stony asteroid, near-Earth object and the largest member of the Apollo group, approximately 7 kilometers in diameter.

It was discovered on 5 December 1972, by Swiss astronomer Paul Wild at Zimmerwald Observatory near Bern, Switzerland, and given the provisional designation 1972 XA. It was named after Sisyphus from Greek mythology.

== Orbit and classification ==
This S-type asteroid (composed of rocky silicates) orbits the Sun in the inner main-belt at a distance of 0.9–2.9 AU once every 2 years and 7 months (952 days). Its orbit has an eccentricity of 0.54 and an inclination of 41° with respect to the ecliptic.

The Apollo asteroid has an Earth minimum orbit intersection distance of 0.1037 AU (15,500,000 km), which corresponds to 40.4 lunar distances. It will pass 0.11581 AU (17,325,000 km) from Earth on 24 November 2071, and will peak at roughly apparent magnitude 9.3 on 26 November 2071. When it was discovered it peaked at magnitude 9.0 on 25 November 1972. It is one of the brightest near-Earth asteroids.

== Physical characteristics ==
In the SMASS classification, Sisyphus is a common stony S-type asteroid.

=== Binary system ===
In 1985, this object was detected with radar from the Arecibo Observatory at a distance of 0.25 AU. The measured radar cross-section was 8 square kilometers. During the radar observations, a small minor-planet moon was detected around Sisyphus, although its existence was not reported until December 2007. Robert Stephens confirmed that it is a suspected binary, and Brian Warner added additional weight to this conclusion, giving 27.16±0.05 hours as the satellite's orbital period, longer than the 25 hours previously reported by Stephens.

=== Diameter and albedo ===
With a measured mean diameter in the range of 5.7–8.9 kilometers, it is the largest of the Earth-crossing asteroids, comparable in size to the Chicxulub object whose impact contributed to the extinction of the dinosaurs. Larger near-Earth asteroids which are neither classified as Apollos nor Earth-crossers include 1036 Ganymed (32 km), 3552 Don Quixote (19 km), 433 Eros (17 km), and 4954 Eric (10.8 km).

== Naming ==
This minor planet is named after Sisyphus from Greek mythology and refers to the cruel king of Ephyra, punished by being given the task of rolling a large stone up to a hill in the underworld, only to have it roll down again each time he neared the top. The official naming citation was published by the Minor Planet Center on 20 December 1974 (M.P.C. 3758).
