= 2001 Einstein =

Asteroid

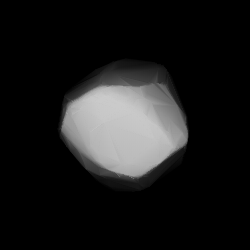
- Shape model of Einstein from its lightcurve

Discovery
- Discovered by: P. Wild
- Discovery site: Zimmerwald Obs.
- Discovery date: 5 March 1973

Designations
- Named after: Albert Einstein (physicist)
- Alternative designations: 1973 EB
- Minor planet category: main-belt · Hungaria

Orbital characteristics
- Epoch 4 September 2017 (JD 2458000.5)
- Uncertainty parameter 0
- Observation arc: 43.43 yr (15,864 days)
- Aphelion: 2.1242 AU
- Perihelion: 1.7430 AU
- Semi-major axis: 1.9336 AU
- Eccentricity: 0.0986
- Orbital period (sidereal): 2.69 yr (982 days)
- Mean anomaly: 150.59°
- Mean motion: 0° 21^{m} 59.76^{s} / day
- Inclination: 22.683°
- Longitude of ascending node: 357.08°
- Argument of perihelion: 217.74°

Physical characteristics
- Mean diameter: 3.975±0.154 km 5.66 km (calculated)
- Synodic rotation period: 5.4846±0.0001 h 5.485±0.002 h 5.48503±0.00005 h (S); 5.487±0.001 h
- Geometric albedo: 0.40 (assumed); 0.810±0.169
- Spectral type: X (Tholen), Xe (SMASS); X · E B–V = 0.720; U–B = 0.261
- Absolute magnitude (H): 12.85

2001 Einstein (prov. designation: 1973 EB) is a bright Hungaria asteroid from the innermost region of the asteroid belt. It was discovered by Swiss astronomer Paul Wild at Zimmerwald Observatory near Bern, Switzerland, on 5 March 1973. The X-type asteroid (Xe) has a rotation period of 5.5 hours and measures approximately 5 kilometers (3.1 miles) in diameter. It is named after physicist Albert Einstein (1879–1955).

== Orbit and classification ==
Einstein is a member of the Hungaria family, which form the innermost dense concentration of asteroids in the Solar System. It orbits the Sun in the inner main-belt at a distance of 1.7–2.1 AU once every 2 years and 8 months (982 days). Its orbit has an eccentricity of 0.10 and an inclination of 23° with respect to the ecliptic. As no precoveries were taken, the asteroid's observation arc begins with its discovery in 1973.

== Naming ==
This minor planet was named in honour of the German-born, Swiss–American physicist and Nobelist Albert Einstein (1879–1955). It is considered suitable, that the body discovered at Bern is named after the 1921 Nobel Prize in Physics laureate, since it was the place where he had his golden years while working as a clerk at the Swiss Patent Office in Bern. He is also honored by the lunar crater Einstein. The official naming citation was published by the Minor Planet Center on 15 October 1977 (M.P.C. 4237). Arthur C. Clarke joked in the postscript of his novel 3001: The Final Odyssey that he was hoping asteroid 2001 would be named after him, but it was named for Einstein first. Asteroid 3001 was named 3001 Michelangelo. Clarke was later honoured with asteroid 4923 Clarke, named together with 5020 Asimov.

== Physical characteristics ==
The Tholen classification, Einstein is an X-type asteroid, while in the SMASS classification, it is an Xe-subtype which transitions from the X-type to the very bright E-type asteroid.

=== Rotation period ===
Several rotational lightcurves for this asteroid were obtained from photometric observations. In December 2004, the first lightcurve by American astronomer Brian Warner at his Palmer Divide Observatory (PDS) in Colorado, gave a rotation period of 5.487 hours with a brightness variation of 0.66 in magnitude (U=3). Between 2008 and 2012, three additional lightcurves at the PDS gave an almost identical period of 5.485 hours with an amplitude of 0.67, 0.74 and 1.02, respectively (U=3/3/3). Other lightcurves were obtained by Hanuš at the French CNES and other institutions, which gave a period of 5.48503 hours (U=n.a.), and by Italian astronomer Federico Manzini at SAS observatory in Novara, Jean Strajnic and Raoul Behrend from December 2012, which rendered a period of 5.4846 hours with an amplitude of 0.66 in magnitude (U=2+).

=== Diameter and albedo ===
According to the survey carried out by the NEOWISE mission of NASA's space-based Wide-field Infrared Survey Explorer (WISE), the asteroid measures 4.0 km in diameter and its surface has an exceptionally high albedo of 0.81, for which WISE assigns an E-type. The Collaborative Asteroid Lightcurve Link assumes a lower, yet still high albedo of 0.40 and hence calculates a larger diameter of 5.7 kilometers, as the lower the albedo, the larger the body's diameter for a constant absolute magnitude.
