= 1960 Guisan =

Carbonaceous main-belt asteroid

Discovery
- Discovered by: P. Wild
- Discovery site: Zimmerwald Obs.
- Discovery date: 25 October 1973

Designations
- Named after: Henri Guisan (General)
- Alternative designations: 1973 UA · 1961 VC_{1} 1969 UR_{2}
- Minor planet category: main-belt · (middle)

Orbital characteristics
- Epoch 4 September 2017 (JD 2458000.5)
- Uncertainty parameter 0
- Observation arc: 61.49 yr (22,461 days)
- Aphelion: 2.8352 AU
- Perihelion: 2.2185 AU
- Semi-major axis: 2.5268 AU
- Eccentricity: 0.1220
- Orbital period (sidereal): 4.02 yr (1,467 days)
- Mean anomaly: 74.212°
- Mean motion: 0° 14^{m} 43.44^{s} / day
- Inclination: 8.4737°
- Longitude of ascending node: 22.213°
- Argument of perihelion: 263.99°

Physical characteristics
- Dimensions: 24.55±1.2 km (IRAS:5); 24.65±0.28 km 27.004±0.176 km 27.23±0.57 km 28.411±0.105 km
- Synodic rotation period: 8.46 h
- Geometric albedo: 0.0370±0.0050; 0.041±0.003; 0.049±0.011; 0.0496±0.005 (IRAS:5)
- Spectral type: C B–V = 0.720; U–B = 0.290
- Absolute magnitude (H): 11.93 · 11.93 (IRAS:5)

1960 Guisan, provisional designation 1973 UA, is a carbonaceous asteroid from the middle region of the asteroid belt, approximately 25 kilometers in diameter.

It was discovered on 25 October 1973, by astronomer Paul Wild at Zimmerwald Observatory near Bern, Switzerland, and named after Swiss General Henri Guisan.

== Orbit and classification ==
Guisan orbits the Sun in the central main-belt at a distance of 2.2–2.8 AU once every 4.02 years (1,467 days). Its orbit has an eccentricity of 0.12 and an inclination of 8° with respect to the ecliptic.

== Physical characteristics ==
Guisan has been characterized as a dark C-type asteroid.

It has a rotation period of 8.46 hours and a geometric albedo of 0.04–0.05, as measured by the IRAS, Akari, WISE and NEOWISE surveys.

== Naming ==
This minor planet was named in memory of Henri Guisan (1874–1960), general of the Swiss army during the Second World War. He was notably from the country's smaller Swiss-French part rather than from the German-speaking part. The official naming citation was published by the Minor Planet Center on 18 April 1977 (M.P.C. 4157).
