= 1768 Appenzella =

Main-belt asteroid

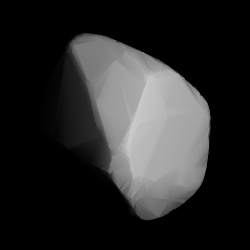
- Shape model of Appenzella from its lightcurve

Discovery
- Discovered by: P. Wild
- Discovery site: Zimmerwald Obs.
- Discovery date: 23 September 1965

Designations
- Named after: Appenzell (canton)
- Alternative designations: 1965 SA · 1934 PM; 1942 TH
- Minor planet category: main-belt · Nysa–Polana complex

Orbital characteristics
- Epoch 4 September 2017 (JD 2458000.5)
- Uncertainty parameter 0
- Observation arc: 74.56 yr (27,232 days)
- Aphelion: 2.8899 AU
- Perihelion: 2.0141 AU
- Semi-major axis: 2.4520 AU
- Eccentricity: 0.1786
- Orbital period (sidereal): 3.84 yr (1,402 days)
- Mean anomaly: 175.69°
- Mean motion: 0° 15^{m} 24.12^{s} / day
- Inclination: 3.2582°
- Longitude of ascending node: 12.423°
- Argument of perihelion: 19.718°

Physical characteristics
- Dimensions: 19.0±1.9 km 19.30±0.17 km 20.221±0.129 km 20.86±2.3 km (IRAS:2); 21±2 km
- Synodic rotation period: 5.18335±0.00001 h 5.1839±0.0001 h
- Geometric albedo: 0.03±0.01; 0.032±0.007; 0.0338±0.009 (IRAS:2); 0.039±0.008; 0.04±0.01
- Spectral type: F (Tholen); C (SMASS); B–V = 0.615; U–B = 0.230
- Absolute magnitude (H): 12.70

1768 Appenzella (prov. designation: 1965 SA) is an asteroid from the inner regions of the asteroid belt, approximately 20 kilometers in diameter. It was discovered on 23 September 1965, by Swiss astronomer Paul Wild at Zimmerwald Observatory near Bern, Switzerland. It was later named after the Swiss canton of Appenzell.

== Classification and orbit ==
Appenzella is a dark carbonaceous asteroid and a member of the Nysa–Polana complex, a collection of overlapping asteroid families. On the Tholen taxonomic scheme, it belongs to the small group of 28 bodies known to have a F-type spectrum.

It orbits the Sun in the inner main-belt at a distance of 2.0–2.9 AU once every 3 years and 10 months (1,402 days). Its orbit has an eccentricity of 0.18 and an inclination of 3° with respect to the ecliptic. The first used observation was made at the Finnish Turku Observatory in 1942, extending the asteroid's observation arc by 23 years prior to its discovery.

== Lightcurve ==
In November 2011, a rotational lightcurve of Appenzella was obtained by French astronomer René Roy at his Blauvac Observatory (627) in southeastern France. Lightcurve analysis gave a well-defined rotation period of 5.1839 hours with a brightness variation of 0.53 magnitude (U=3). In 2016, remodeled photometric data from the Lowell database gave in a very similar period of 5.18335 hours.

== Diameter and albedo ==
Based on the surveys carried out by NASA's Wide-field Infrared Survey Explorer and its subsequent NEOWISE mission, the asteroid measures between 19.0 and 21 kilometers in diameter and its surface has a low albedo between 0.03 and 0.04. The Collaborative Asteroid Lightcurve Link agrees with the results obtained by the Infrared Astronomical Satellite, IRAS, which found an albedo of 0.034 and a mean diameter of 20.9 kilometers, with an absolute magnitude of 12.7.

== Naming ==
In 1971, Appenzella was named by the discoverer in honor of the rural Swiss canton of Appenzell, during the celebration of the 150th anniversary of the public middle school "Kantonsschule Trogen", Appenzell Ausserrhoden, founded in 1821. The official naming citation was published by the Minor Planet Center on 1 July 1972 (M.P.C. 3297).
