= 2029 Binomi =

Asteroid

Discovery
- Discovered by: P. Wild
- Discovery site: Zimmerwald Obs.
- Discovery date: 11 September 1969

Designations
- Named after: Alessandro Binomi (fictitious mathematician)
- Alternative designations: 1969 RB · 1971 BX_{2} 1976 QV_{1}
- Minor planet category: main-belt · Vesta

Orbital characteristics
- Epoch 4 September 2017 (JD 2458000.5)
- Uncertainty parameter 0
- Observation arc: 47.52 yr (17,355 days)
- Aphelion: 2.6515 AU
- Perihelion: 2.0477 AU
- Semi-major axis: 2.3496 AU
- Eccentricity: 0.1285
- Orbital period (sidereal): 3.60 yr (1,316 days)
- Mean anomaly: 120.75°
- Mean motion: 0° 16^{m} 25.32^{s} / day
- Inclination: 5.5869°
- Longitude of ascending node: 278.03°
- Argument of perihelion: 67.217°

Physical characteristics
- Dimensions: 5.39 km (calculated); 6.893±0.164 km 7.050±0.058 km
- Synodic rotation period: 3.7555±0.010 h 3.756±0.0015 h
- Geometric albedo: 0.24 (assumed); 0.2468±0.0358; 0.257±0.048
- Spectral type: SMASS = S
- Absolute magnitude (H): 12.9 · 13.0 · 13.030±0.210 (R) · 13.058±0.001 (R) · 13.24±0.26 · 13.51

2029 Binomi, provisional designation 1969 RB, is a Vestian asteroid from the inner regions of the asteroid belt, approximately 7 kilometers in diameter.

The asteroid was discovered on 11 September 1969, by Paul Wild at Zimmerwald Observatory near Bern, Switzerland. It was named for the fictitious mathematician "Alessandro Binomi" who invented the binomial formula.

== Classification and orbit ==
Binomi is a member of the Vesta family, one of the largest collisional populations of the inner asteroid belt. It orbits the Sun at a distance of 2.0–2.7 AU once every 3 years and 7 months (1,316 days). Its orbit has an eccentricity of 0.13 and an inclination of 6° with respect to the ecliptic.

The body's observation arc begins at Crimea–Nauchnij on 10 September 1969, the night before its official discovery observation at Zimmerwald.

== Physical characteristics ==
In the SMASS classification, Binomi is a stony S-type asteroid.

=== Lightcurves ===
In January 2014, two rotational lightcurves of Binomi were obtained from photometric observations in the R-band by astronomers at the Palomar Transient Factory in California. Lightcurve analysis gave a rotation period of 3.7555 and 3.756 hours with a brightness variation of 0.51 and 0.52 magnitude, respectively (U=2/2).

=== Diameter and albedo ===
According to the survey carried out by NASA's Wide-field Infrared Survey Explorer with its subsequent NEOWISE mission, Binomi measures 6.893 and 7.050 kilometers in diameter and its surface has an albedo of 0.2468 and 0.257, respectively.

The Collaborative Asteroid Lightcurve Link assumes an albedo of 0.24 – derived from 8 Flora, the largest member and namesake of its family – and calculates a diameter of 5.39 kilometers based on an absolute magnitude of 13.51.

== Naming ==
This minor planet was named for the fictitious mathematician "Alessandro Binomi", inventor of the binomial formula. This act of parody science was common among students at German-speaking universities (de:Binomi). The real inventors of the binomial formula are the Bernoullis, after whom the asteroid 2034 Bernoulli was named. The approved naming citation was published by the Minor Planet Center on 1 August 1981 (M.P.C. 6208).
