= 13025 Zürich =

Main-belt asteroid

Discovery
- Discovered by: P. Wild
- Discovery site: Zimmerwald Obs.
- Discovery date: 28 January 1989

Designations
- Named after: Zürich (Swiss city)
- Alternative designations: 1989 BA
- Minor planet category: main-belt · Phocaea

Orbital characteristics
- Epoch 4 September 2017 (JD 2458000.5)
- Uncertainty parameter 0
- Observation arc: 41.25 yr (15,066 days)
- Aphelion: 3.0429 AU
- Perihelion: 1.7221 AU
- Semi-major axis: 2.3825 AU
- Eccentricity: 0.2772
- Orbital period (sidereal): 3.68 yr (1,343 days)
- Mean anomaly: 279.41°
- Mean motion: 0° 16^{m} 4.8^{s} / day
- Inclination: 23.921°
- Longitude of ascending node: 342.72°
- Argument of perihelion: 140.93°

Physical characteristics
- Dimensions: 4.89±0.10 km 5.28 km (calculated)
- Synodic rotation period: 18.53±0.02 h
- Geometric albedo: 0.23 (assumed); 0.322±0.083
- Spectral type: S
- Absolute magnitude (H): 13.40 · 13.6

13025 Zürich, provisional designation 1989 BA, is a stony Phocaea asteroid from the inner regions of the asteroid belt, approximately 5 kilometers in diameter. It was discovered on 28 January 1989, by Swiss astronomer Paul Wild at Zimmerwald Observatory near Bern, Switzerland, and later named for the Swiss city of Zürich.

== Orbit and classification ==
The stony S-type asteroid is a member of the Phocaea family (701), a rather small group of asteroids with similar orbital characteristics, named after its largest member, 25 Phocaea. It orbits the Sun in the inner main-belt at a distance of 1.7–3.0 AU once every 3 years and 8 months (1,343 days). Its orbit has an eccentricity of 0.28 and an inclination of 24° with respect to the ecliptic. A first precovery was obtained at the Australian Siding Spring Observatory in 1975, extending the asteroid's observation arc by 14 years prior to its discovery.

== Lightcurve ==
In November 2006, American astronomer Brian Warner obtained a rotational lightcurve from photometric observations taken at his Palmer Divide Observatory in Colorado. The lightcurve showed a rotation period of 18.53±0.02 hours and a brightness variation of 0.24 in magnitude (U=2+).

== Diameter and albedo estimates ==
According to the survey carried out by NASA's space-based Wide-field Infrared Survey Explorer with its subsequent NEOWISE mission, the asteroid measures 4.9 kilometers in diameter and its surface has a high albedo of 0.32, while the Collaborative Asteroid Lightcurve Link assumes an albedo of 0.23 and hence calculates a somewhat larger diameter of 5.3 kilometers with an absolute magnitude of 13.6.

== Naming ==
The minor planet is named after Zürich, Switzerland's largest city and economic center, located at the northwestern tip of Lake Zürich. It was founded by the Romans in the 1st century BC on the rivers Sihl and Limmat and was then called Turicum. The official naming citation was published by the Minor Planet Center on 1 November 2001 (M.P.C. 43762).
