= 1938 Lausanna =

Stony main-belt asteroid

Discovery
- Discovered by: P. Wild
- Discovery site: Zimmerwald Obs.
- Discovery date: 19 April 1974

Designations
- Named after: Lausanne (Swiss city)
- Alternative designations: 1974 HC · 1934 KA; 1947 DB · 1950 CO; 1955 VK · 1957 EH; 1962 WB_{1} · 1967 ED_{1} 1971 OX · 1972 XY_{1}
- Minor planet category: main-belt · Flora

Orbital characteristics
- Epoch 4 September 2017 (JD 2458000.5)
- Uncertainty parameter 0
- Observation arc: 82.99 yr (30,312 days)
- Aphelion: 2.5938 AU
- Perihelion: 1.8796 AU
- Semi-major axis: 2.2367 AU
- Eccentricity: 0.1597
- Orbital period (sidereal): 3.35 yr (1,222 days)
- Mean anomaly: 329.17°
- Mean motion: 0° 17^{m} 40.56^{s} / day
- Inclination: 3.3343°
- Longitude of ascending node: 171.69°
- Argument of perihelion: 64.830°

Physical characteristics
- Dimensions: 7.638±0.124 km 7.82 km (calculated); 8.214±0.077 km
- Synodic rotation period: 2.748±0.001 h (Note: Skiff (2014) web: rotation period 2.748±0.001 hours with a brightness amplitude of 0.13 mag and a Quality Code of 3-. Summary figures at Collaborative Asteroid Lightcurve Link (CALL) for (1938) Lausanna); 2.748±0.001 h
- Geometric albedo: 0.1660±0.0301; 0.192±0.055; 0.24 (assumed)
- Spectral type: S
- Absolute magnitude (H): 12.60±0.26 · 12.7 · 13.0

1938 Lausanna, provisional designation 1974 HC, is a stony Florian asteroid from the inner regions of the asteroid belt. It is approximately 8 kilometers in diameter, and was discovered on 19 April 1974 by Swiss astronomer, Paul Wild at Zimmerwald Observatory near Bern, Switzerland. It is named for the city of Lausanne.

== Orbit and classification ==
Lausanna is a S-type asteroid and member of the Flora family, one of the largest collisional populations of stony asteroids in the main-belt. It orbits the Sun in the inner main-belt at a distance of 1.9–2.6 AU once every 3 years and 4 months (1,222 days). Its orbit has an eccentricity of 0.16 and an inclination of 3° with respect to the ecliptic. It was first identified as 1934 KA at Johannesburg Observatory in 1934, extending the body's observation arc by 40 years prior to its official discovery observation at Zimmerwald.

== Physical characteristics ==
=== Rotation period ===
In March 2014, two rotational lightcurves of Lausanna were obtained from photometric observations by American astronomer Brian Skiff and by Johan Warell at Lindby Observatory (K60) in Sweden. Lightcurve analysis gave an identical rotation period of 2.748 hours with a brightness amplitude of 0.13 and 0.12 magnitude, respectively (U=3-/2). The short period is near the threshold of 2.2 hours for fast rotating asteroids.

=== Diameter and albedo ===
According to the space-based survey carried out by NASA's Wide-field Infrared Survey Explorer with its subsequent NEOWISE mission, Lausanna measures 7.64 and 8.21 kilometers in diameter, and its surface has an albedo of 0.166 and 0.192, respectively. The Collaborative Asteroid Lightcurve Link assumes an albedo of 0.24 – derived from 8 Flora, the largest member and namesake of its family – and calculates a diameter of 7.82 kilometers based on an absolute magnitude of 12.7.

== Naming ==
This minor planet was named for the Swiss city of Lausanne, located in the French-speaking part of the country. The discoverer Paul Wild, known for his unconventional minor-planet namings, discovered three more asteroids during winter of 1973/74. He named these 1935 Lucerna, 1936 Lugano and 1937 Locarno, after the Swiss cities Lucerne, Lugano and Locarno, respectively, hence composing an alliterated quartet of sequentially numbered, thematically named minor planets. The official naming citation was published by the Minor Planet Center on 1 April 1978 (M.P.C. 4358).
