= 1936 Lugano =

Carbonaceous main-belt asteroid

Discovery
- Discovered by: P. Wild
- Discovery site: Zimmerwald Obs.
- Discovery date: 24 November 1973

Designations
- Named after: Lugano (Swiss city)
- Alternative designations: 1973 WD · 1936 LC; 1949 KE_{1} · 1951 WX; 1964 VA_{1} · 1970 AG_{1} 1970 AL_{1} · 1970 CD
- Minor planet category: main-belt · (middle); Adeona

Orbital characteristics
- Epoch 4 September 2017 (JD 2458000.5)
- Uncertainty parameter 0
- Observation arc: 61.33 yr (22,399 days)
- Aphelion: 3.0395 AU
- Perihelion: 2.3131 AU
- Semi-major axis: 2.6763 AU
- Eccentricity: 0.1357
- Orbital period (sidereal): 4.38 yr (1,599 days)
- Mean anomaly: 291.44°
- Mean motion: 0° 13^{m} 30.36^{s} / day
- Inclination: 10.254°
- Longitude of ascending node: 265.17°
- Argument of perihelion: 255.13°

Physical characteristics
- Dimensions: 23.48±8.63 km 24.56 km (derived); 24.81±0.8 km 27.95±0.87 km 31.037±0.137 km 31.43±8.87 km 33.704±0.067 km
- Synodic rotation period: 19.594±0.007 h 19.651±0.015 h
- Geometric albedo: 0.028±0.011; 0.0294±0.0024; 0.04±0.02; 0.04±0.03; 0.0558 (derived); 0.093±0.007; 0.1042±0.008
- Spectral type: SMASS = Ch · P
- Absolute magnitude (H): 11.10 · 11.70 · 11.78 · 11.8 · 12.45±0.41

1936 Lugano, provisional designation 1973 WD, is a carbonaceous Adeonian asteroid from the middle region of the asteroid belt, approximately 26 kilometers in diameter.

It was discovered on 24 November 1973, by Swiss astronomer Paul Wild at Zimmerwald Observatory near Bern, Switzerland. It was later named for the Swiss city of Lugano.

== Classification and orbit ==
Lugano is a member of the Adeona family (505), a large family of carbonaceous asteroids.

It orbits the Sun in the central main-belt at a distance of 2.3–3.0 AU once every 4 years and 5 months (1,599 days). Its orbit has an eccentricity of 0.14 and an inclination of 10° with respect to the ecliptic. It was first identified as 1936 LC at Johannesburg Observatory in 1936. The body's observation arc begins 22 years prior to its official discovery observation at Zimmerwald, when it was identified as 1951 WX at McDonald Observatory in 1951.

== Physical characteristics ==
=== Spectral type ===
In the SMASS classification, Lugano is a Ch-subtype, a hydrated C-type asteroid, while the Wide-field Infrared Survey Explorer (WISE) rates it as a very dark and featureless reddish P-type asteroid.

=== Diameter and albedo ===
According to the space-based surveys carried out by the Infrared Astronomical Satellite IRAS, the Japanese Akari satellite and the NEOWISE mission of NASA's WISE telescope, Lugano measures between 23.48 and 33.7 kilometers in diameter and its surface has an albedo in the range of 0.028 to 0.1042.

The Collaborative Asteroid Lightcurve Link derives an albedo of 0.056 and a diameter of 24.6 kilometers, based on an absolute magnitude of 11.8.

=== Lightcurves ===
Two rotational lightcurves of Lugano were obtained from photometric observations made in February 2005. The first lightcurve by French astronomer Raymond Poncy gave a rotation period of 19.594±0.007 hours with a brightness variation of 0.25 magnitude (U=2). The second lightcurve from the Carbuncle Hill Observatory (912), in Rhode Island, United States, rendered a well-defined period of 19.651±0.015 with an amplitude of 0.31 in magnitude (U=3).

== Naming ==
The minor planet is named after the Swiss-Italian city of Lugano, located south of the Alps and known for its mild climate. During the winter half-year of 1973/74, Paul Wild discovered three more asteroids, 1935 Lucerna, 1937 Locarno and 1938 Lausanna, which he named after the Swiss cities Lucerne, Locarno and Lausanne, respectively, composing a quartet of sequentially numbered, thematically named asteroids. The official naming citation was published by the Minor Planet Center on 1 April 1978 (M.P.C. 4358).
