= 4954 Eric =

Near-Earth asteroid

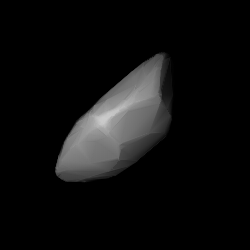
- Shape model of Eric from its lightcurve

Discovery
- Discovered by: Brian P. Roman
- Discovery site: Palomar Obs.
- Discovery date: 23 September 1990

Designations
- Alternative designations: 1990 SQ

Orbital characteristics
- Epoch 13 January 2016 (JD 2457400.5)
- Uncertainty parameter 0
- Observation arc: 14681 days (40.19 yr)
- Aphelion: 2.8993 AU (433.73 Gm)
- Perihelion: 1.10393 AU (165.146 Gm)
- Semi-major axis: 2.0016 AU (299.44 Gm)
- Eccentricity: 0.44848
- Orbital period (sidereal): 2.83 yr (1034.4 d)
- Mean anomaly: 314.18°
- Mean motion: 0° 20^{m} 52.944^{s} / day
- Inclination: 17.4461°
- Longitude of ascending node: 358.52°
- Argument of perihelion: 52.429°
- Earth MOID: 0.194843 AU (29.1481 Gm)

Physical characteristics
- Dimensions: 10.8 km
- Mean radius: 5.4 km
- Synodic rotation period: 12.052 hours
- Spectral type: S (SMASSII)
- Absolute magnitude (H): 12.6

4954 Eric (prov. designation: 1990 SQ) is an eccentric, stony asteroid, classified as a near-Earth object of the Amor group, approximately 11 kilometers (6.8 miles) in diameter. It was discovered by American astronomer Brian Roman at Palomar Observatory on 23 September 1990. The asteroid was named after its discoverer's son, Eric Roman.

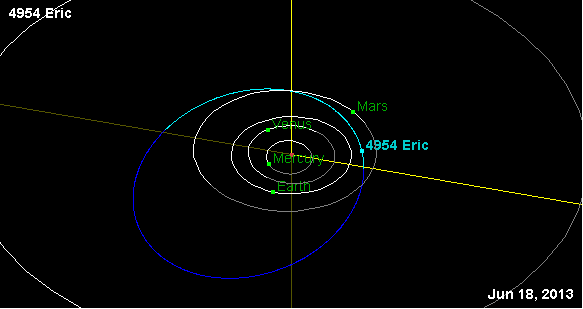
Orbit diagram of 4954 Eric with location of object on 18 June 2013

It is the largest near-Earth asteroid discovered since 3552 Don Quixote in 1983. On 2007 October 11 the asteroid passed 0.2865 AU (42,860,000 km; 26,630,000 mi) from Earth. It currently makes closer approaches to Mars than it does Earth. The asteroid has a rotation period of 12.05 hours.

Other large near-Earth asteroids include 1036 Ganymed (32 km), 3552 Don Quixote (19 km), 433 Eros (17 km), and 1866 Sisyphus (8.5 km).

Eric as it moves over 2 hours on October 31, 2024. Recorded by an amateur telescope in California.
