= 1748 Mauderli =

Hildian asteroid

Discovery
- Discovered by: P. Wild
- Discovery site: Zimmerwald Obs.
- Discovery date: 7 September 1966

Designations
- Named after: Sigmund Mauderli (Swiss astronomer)
- Alternative designations: 1966 RA · 1927 SF; 1934 ND_{1} · 1938 DL_{2} 1943 TP · 1951 UH; 1951 XD · A922 BC
- Minor planet category: main-belt · Hilda

Orbital characteristics
- Epoch 4 September 2017 (JD 2458000.5)
- Uncertainty parameter 0
- Observation arc: 95.36 yr (34,830 days)
- Aphelion: 4.8163 AU
- Perihelion: 3.0642 AU
- Semi-major axis: 3.9403 AU
- Eccentricity: 0.2223
- Orbital period (sidereal): 7.82 yr (2,857 days)
- Mean anomaly: 223.85°
- Mean motion: 0° 7^{m} 33.6^{s} / day
- Inclination: 3.2937°
- Longitude of ascending node: 125.95°
- Argument of perihelion: 199.95°
- Jupiter MOID: 0.5342 AU

Physical characteristics
- Dimensions: 40.32 km (derived); 44.908±0.345 km 51.91±1.28 km
- Synodic rotation period: 6.00 h 6.001±0.001 h (Note: Slyusarev (2012) web: rotation period 6.001±0.001 hours with a brightness amplitude of 0.1 magnitude. Summary figures for (1748) Mauderli at Collaborative Asteroid Lightcurve Link (CALL).)
- Geometric albedo: 0.037±0.002; 0.048±0.013; 0.05±0.01; 0.057 (assumed)
- Spectral type: Tholen = D · D B–V = 0.710; U–B = 0.264
- Absolute magnitude (H): 10.58±0.26 · 10.65 · 10.70

1748 Mauderli, provisional designation 1966 RA, is a dark and very reddish Hildian asteroid from the outermost region of the asteroid belt, approximately 45 kilometers in diameter.

It was discovered on 7 September 1966, by astronomer Paul Wild at Zimmerwald Observatory near Bern, Switzerland, and was later named after Swiss astronomer Sigmund Mauderli.

== Orbit and classification ==
Mauderli is a member of the Hilda family of asteroids which stay in a 3:2 resonance with the gas giant Jupiter. Among the Hilda family, it is one of its members with the highest amplitude of libration relative to the stable periodic orbit.

The asteroid orbits the Sun in the outermost main-belt at a distance of 3.1–4.8 AU once every 7 years and 10 months (2,857 days). Its orbit has an eccentricity of 0.22 and an inclination of 3° with respect to the ecliptic. Mauderli was first identified as A922 BC at Heidelberg Observatory in 1922, extending the body's observation arc by 44 years prior to its official discovery observation.

== Physical characteristics ==
Mauderli is a dark D-type asteroid in the Tholen classification. It is also the reddest among the known asteroids of this spectral type.

Three rotational lightcurves gave a concurring rotation period of 6.00 hours with a brightness variation between 0.10 and 0.12 magnitude (U=n.a/3/2-).

=== Diameter and albedo ===
Based on the space-based surveys carried out by the Japanese Akari satellite and NASA's Wide-field Infrared Survey Explorer with its subsequent NEOWISE missions, Mauderli measures 44.908 and 51.91 kilometers in diameter and has an albedo of 0.037 and 0.048, respectively. The Collaborative Asteroid Lightcurve Link assumes a standard albedo for carbonaceous asteroids of 0.057 and calculates a diameter of 40.32 kilometers with on an absolute magnitude of 10.7.

== Naming ==
This minor planet was named by the discoverer in honor of Sigmund Mauderli (1876–1962), Swiss astronomer and director of the Astronomical Institute at the University of Bern from 1921 to 1946. He devoted much of his time to orbit determination and perturbation computing of minor planets for the Astronomisches Rechen-Institut in Germany. The official naming citation was published by the Minor Planet Center on 1 October 1969 (M.P.C. 2971).
