= 2175 Andrea Doria =

Stony Florian asteroid

Discovery
- Discovered by: P. Wild
- Discovery site: Zimmerwald Obs.
- Discovery date: 12 October 1977

Designations
- Named after: Andrea Doria (16th-century admiral)
- Alternative designations: 1977 TY · 1964 VY_{1} 1967 RS · 1967 TE
- Minor planet category: main-belt · Flora

Orbital characteristics
- Epoch 4 September 2017 (JD 2458000.5)
- Uncertainty parameter 0
- Observation arc: 66.18 yr (24,171 days)
- Aphelion: 2.6751 AU
- Perihelion: 1.7560 AU
- Semi-major axis: 2.2155 AU
- Eccentricity: 0.2074
- Orbital period (sidereal): 3.30 yr (1,205 days)
- Mean anomaly: 44.452°
- Mean motion: 0° 17^{m} 56.04^{s} / day
- Inclination: 3.7056°
- Longitude of ascending node: 222.09°
- Argument of perihelion: 143.68°

Physical characteristics
- Dimensions: 3.86±0.14 km 3.922±0.042; 4.013±0.021 km 4.50 km (calculated)
- Synodic rotation period: 4.880±0.001 h (Note: Megna (2011) web: lightcurve plot of (2175) Andrea Doria, Megna, R. (2011) with a rotation period 4.880±0.001 hours with a brightness amplitude of 0.25 mag. Quality code of 3. Summary figures at Collaborative Asteroid Lightcurve Link)
- Geometric albedo: 0.24 (assumed); 0.392±0.067; 0.3997±0.0568; 0.417±0.057
- Spectral type: S
- Absolute magnitude (H): 13.6 · 13.70 · 13.9 · 14.28±0.29

2175 Andrea Doria, provisional designation 1977 TY, is a stony Florian asteroid from the inner regions of the asteroid belt, approximately 4 kilometers in diameter.

It was discovered on 12 October 1977, by Swiss astronomer Paul Wild at Zimmerwald Observatory near Bern, Switzerland, and named after 16th-century Genoese admiral Andrea Doria.

== Orbit and classification ==
Andrea Doria is a member of the Flora family, one of the largest families of stony asteroids in the main belt. It orbits the Sun in the inner main-belt at a distance of 1.8–2.7 AU once every 3 years and 4 months (1,205 days). Its orbit has an eccentricity of 0.21 and an inclination of 4° with respect to the ecliptic. A first precovery was taken at Palomar Observatory in 1950, extending the body's observation arc by 27 years prior to its official discovery observation at Zimmerwald.

== Physical characteristics ==
In October 2010, a rotational lightcurve of Andrea Doria was obtained from photometric observations by American amateur astronomer Ralph Megna. Lightcurve analysis gave a well-defined rotation period of 4.880 hours with a brightness variation of 0.25 magnitude (U=3).

According to the survey carried out by NASA's Wide-field Infrared Survey Explorer with its subsequent NEOWISE mission, Andrea Doria measures between 3.86 and 4.013 kilometers in diameter and its surface has an albedo between 0.392 and 0.417. The Collaborative Asteroid Lightcurve Link assumes an albedo of 0.24 – derived from 8 Flora, a S-type asteroid and the family's largest member and namesake – and calculates a diameter of 4.50 kilometers with an absolute magnitude of 13.9.

== Naming ==
This minor planet was named after Genoese admiral Andrea Doria (1466–1560), popularized in Friedrich Schiller's drama Fiesco. Several ships, including the SS Andrea Doria, famous for its sinking off the coast of New England, had also been named after the admiral. The official naming citation was published by the Minor Planet Center on 22 September 1983 (M.P.C. 8151).
