= 2151 Hadwiger =

Main-belt asteroid

Discovery
- Discovered by: P. Wild
- Discovery site: Zimmerwald Obs.
- Discovery date: 3 November 1977

Designations
- Named after: Hugo Hadwiger
- Alternative designations: 1977 VX · 1932 UC; 1940 SB · 1963 FF; 1969 UU_{2} · 1973 SQ_{6} 1975 EA
- Minor planet category: main-belt · Maria

Orbital characteristics
- Epoch 4 September 2017 (JD 2458000.5)
- Uncertainty parameter 0
- Observation arc: 83.16 yr (30,374 days)
- Aphelion: 2.7071 AU
- Perihelion: 2.4145 AU
- Semi-major axis: 2.5608 AU
- Eccentricity: 0.0571
- Orbital period (sidereal): 4.10 yr (1,497 days)
- Mean anomaly: 177.54°
- Mean motion: 0° 14^{m} 25.8^{s} / day
- Inclination: 15.487°
- Longitude of ascending node: 27.926°
- Argument of perihelion: 86.794°

Physical characteristics
- Dimensions: 13.767±0.540
- Synodic rotation period: 5.872±0.002; 2.29±0.01 h
- Geometric albedo: 0.446±0.058
- Spectral type: Tholen = CSU; C
- Absolute magnitude (H): 11.0

2151 Hadwiger, provisional designation 1977 VX, is a Marian asteroid from the central region of the asteroid belt, approximately 15 kilometers in diameter. It was discovered on 3 November 1977, by Swiss astronomer Paul Wild at Zimmerwald Observatory near Bern, Switzerland.

== Orbit and characterization ==
Hadwiger orbits the Sun at a distance of 2.4–2.7 AU once every 4 years and 1 month (1,497 days). Its orbit has an eccentricity of 0.06 and an inclination of 15° with respect to the ecliptic. It is a member of the Maria family of asteroids.

In the Tholen classification, Hadwiger is a carbonaceous CSU-type. It has a rotation period of hours with a brightness variation of in magnitude.

== Naming ==
This minor planet was named in memory of Swiss mathematician Hugo Hadwiger (1908–1981), professor at the University of Berne for more than 40 years and very popular for his refined art of presentation. The approved naming citation was published by the Minor Planet Center on 22 September 1983 (M.P.C. 8151).
