= 1961 Dufour =

Dark main-belt asteroid

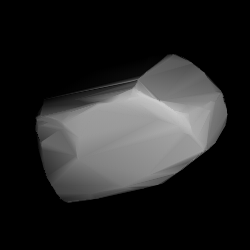
- Modelled shape of Dufour from its lightcurve

Discovery
- Discovered by: P. Wild
- Discovery site: Zimmerwald Obs.
- Discovery date: 19 November 1973

Designations
- Named after: Henri Dufour (Swiss General)
- Alternative designations: 1973 WA · 1927 UM; 1952 BQ_{1} · 1962 YG; 1969 AH · 1973 SY_{3}
- Minor planet category: main-belt · (outer)

Orbital characteristics
- Epoch 4 September 2017 (JD 2458000.5)
- Uncertainty parameter 0
- Observation arc: 54.20 yr (19,798 days)
- Aphelion: 3.5879 AU
- Perihelion: 2.7949 AU
- Semi-major axis: 3.1914 AU
- Eccentricity: 0.1242
- Orbital period (sidereal): 5.70 yr (2,082 days)
- Mean anomaly: 187.01°
- Mean motion: 0° 10^{m} 22.44^{s} / day
- Inclination: 6.6497°
- Longitude of ascending node: 29.581°
- Argument of perihelion: 57.015°

Physical characteristics
- Mean diameter: 50.25 km (derived); 50.31±1.6 km (IRAS:20); 51.15±0.98 km
- Synodic rotation period: 15.7583±0.0309 h 15.79±0.01 h
- Geometric albedo: 0.0335 (derived); 0.039±0.002; 0.0402±0.003 (IRAS:20)
- Spectral type: C
- Absolute magnitude (H): 10.60 · 10.7 · 10.761±0.002 (R) · 10.8

1961 Dufour (prov. designation: 1973 WA) is a large background asteroid, approximately 50 kilometers (31 miles) in diameter, located in the outer region of the asteroid belt. It was discovered on 19 November 1973, by Swiss astronomer Paul Wild at Zimmerwald Observatory near Bern, Switzerland, and later named for 19th-century Swiss General Henri Dufour.

== Classification and orbit ==
Dufour is a dark C-type asteroid, that orbits the Sun in the outer main-belt at a distance of 2.8–3.6 AU once every 5 years and 8 months (2,082 days). Its orbit has an eccentricity of 0.12 and an inclination of 7° with respect to the ecliptic. It was first identified as 1927 UM at Simeiz Observatory in 1927. The body's observation arc begins 21 years prior to its official discovery at Zimmerwald, when it was identified as 1952 BQ1 at McDonald Observatory in 1952.

== Naming ==
This minor planet is named after Swiss General Henri Dufour (1787–1875), who lead the Swiss forces to victory against the renegade catholic cantons in the Sonderbund War of November 1847. The war claimed fewer than a 100 casualties.

Dufour was also a co-founder of the International Committee of the Red Cross, founder of the Swiss Federal Office of Topography and architect of the first complete geodetic survey of Switzerland. The official naming citation was published by the Minor Planet Center on 18 April 1977 (M.P.C. 4157). The "Dufourspitze", the Alp's second-highest mountain after the Mont Blanc, was also named in his honour.

== Physical characteristics ==
A two chord stellar occultation by the asteroid observed in 2004 gave an approximate diameter of 50 km.

French amateur astronomer Pierre Antonini obtained a lightcurve of Dufour from photometric observations taken during April 2010. Lightcurve analysis gave a well-defined rotation period of 15.79±0.01 hours with an amplitude of 0.31 in magnitude (U=3-). In August 2013, photometric observations at the Palomar Transient Factory, California, gave a similar period of 15.7583±0.0309 hours with a brightness variation of 0.35 (U=2).

According to the surveys carried out by the Infrared Astronomical Satellite IRAS and the Japanese Akari satellite, Dufour measures 50.3 and 51.2 kilometers in diameter and its surface has an albedo of 0.040 and 0.039, respectively. The Collaborative Asteroid Lightcurve Link derives an albedo of 0.034 and a diameter of 50.3 kilometers with an absolute magnitude of 10.8.
