= 1687 Glarona =

Main-belt asteroid

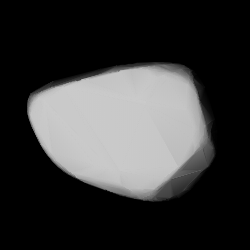
- Shape model of Glarona from its lightcurve

Discovery
- Discovered by: P. Wild
- Discovery site: Zimmerwald Obs.
- Discovery date: 19 September 1965

Designations
- Pronunciation: /ɡləˈroʊnə/
- Named after: Glarus (Swiss canton)
- Alternative designations: 1965 SC · 1926 UA; 1931 RB_{1} · 1942 PD; 1945 EA · 1948 QN; 1948 RD_{1} · 1954 TB; 1954 UB_{2} · 1959 PG; 1960 XD · 1965 UX; A909 UA · A915 XC
- Minor planet category: main-belt · Themis

Orbital characteristics
- Epoch 4 September 2017 (JD 2458000.5)
- Uncertainty parameter 0
- Observation arc: 107.45 yr (39,245 days)
- Aphelion: 3.7148 AU
- Perihelion: 2.6004 AU
- Semi-major axis: 3.1576 AU
- Eccentricity: 0.1765
- Orbital period (sidereal): 5.61 yr (2,049 days)
- Mean anomaly: 62.841°
- Mean motion: 0° 10^{m} 32.52^{s} / day
- Inclination: 2.6367°
- Longitude of ascending node: 93.570°
- Argument of perihelion: 316.57°

Physical characteristics
- Dimensions: 31.52±0.50 km 33.93±4.9 km (IRAS:6); 36.75±0.93 km 37.850±0.194; 42.007±0.515 km
- Synodic rotation period: 6.3 h (Note: Tedesco (1979): rotation period of 6.3 hours with an amplitude in brightness of 0.75 in magnitude. (Tedesco, E.F. (1979) PhD Dissertation, New. Mex. State Univ. 280pp.). Summary figures given at Light curve Database for (1687) Glarona and JPL's Small-Body Database Browser for 1687 Glarona (1965 SC)); 6.49595±0.00001 h
- Geometric albedo: 0.0795±0.0130; 0.107±0.006; 0.1219±0.044 (IRAS:6); 0.141±0.021
- Spectral type: S B–V = 0.670; U–B = 0.380
- Absolute magnitude (H): 10.25 · 10.51±0.28

1687 Glarona (prov. designation: 1965 SC) is a stony Themis asteroid approximately 34 kilometers in diameter from the outer region of the asteroid belt. It was discovered by Swiss astronomer Paul Wild at Zimmerwald Observatory near Bern, Switzerland, on 19 September 1965. It was later named after the Swiss Canton of Glarus.

== Orbit and classification ==
The asteroid is a member of the Themis family, one of the larger groups in the outer main-belt. It orbits the Sun at a distance of 2.6–3.7 AU once every 5 years and 7 months (2,049 days). Its orbit has an eccentricity of 0.18 and an inclination of 3° with respect to the ecliptic. The first precovery was taken at Heidelberg Observatory in 1909, extending the asteroid's observation arc by 56 years prior to its discovery.

== Naming ==
The minor planet was named for of the discoverer's home valley, the Swiss Canton of Glarus and its capital Glarus. Paul Wild (1925–2014) was a prolific discoverer almost 100 asteroids, and is well known for his discovery of comet Wild 2, which was visited by NASA's Stardust mission. The official naming citation was published by the Minor Planet Center on 1 October 1969 (M.P.C. 2971).

== Physical characteristics ==
=== Lightcurves ===
A rotational lightcurve obtained in the 1970s gave a well-defined rotation period of 6.3 hours with a brightness amplitude of 0.75 in magnitude (U=3). In March 2016, a second period was published based on data from the Lowell Photometric Database (LPD). Using lightcurve inversion and convex shape models, as well as distributed computing power and the help of individual volunteers, a period of 6.49595±0.00001 hours could be obtained for this asteroid from the LPD's sparse-in-time photometry data (U=n.a.).

=== Diameter and albedo ===
According to the space-based surveys carried out by the Infrared Astronomical Satellite IRAS, the Japanese Akari satellite, and NASA's Wide-field Infrared Survey Explorer with its subsequent NEOWISE mission, the asteroid measures between 31.5 and 42.0 kilometers in diameter and its surface has an albedo in the range of 0.0795 to 0.141.

The Collaborative Asteroid Lightcurve Link (CALL) gives preference to the results obtained by IRAS with an albedo of 0.1219 and a diameter of 33.93 kilometers. CALL also classifies the Themistian asteroid as a stony S-class body, which are otherwise known to have low albedos, showing spectra of carbonaceous C-type bodies (also see Carbonaceous chondrites).
