= 2080 (disambiguation) =

2080 is a year in the 2080s decade

2080 may also refer to:

- The year 2080 BC in the 21st century BC
- 2080 (number)
- 2080 Jihlava, a main-belt asteroid
- Nvidia RTX 2080, a graphics card
- NGC 2080, the Ghost Head Nebula
- "2080", a song by Yeasayer from their album All Hour Cymbals

== See also ==
- 20-80 rule, alternative name for the Pareto principle
