= 2080 Jihlava =

Main-belt asteroid

Discovery
- Discovered by: P. Wild
- Discovery site: Zimmerwald Obs.
- Discovery date: 27 February 1976

Designations
- Named after: Jihlava (Czech city)
- Alternative designations: 1976 DG · 1955 SH_{1} 1955 SH_{2} · 1955 VF; 1968 UO · 1970 GF_{2} 1973 GY
- Minor planet category: main-belt · Flora

Orbital characteristics
- Epoch 4 September 2017 (JD 2458000.5)
- Uncertainty parameter 0
- Observation arc: 61.46 yr (22,449 days)
- Aphelion: 2.3086 AU
- Perihelion: 2.0443 AU
- Semi-major axis: 2.1765 AU
- Eccentricity: 0.0607
- Orbital period (sidereal): 3.21 yr (1,173 days)
- Mean anomaly: 48.478°
- Mean motion: 0° 18^{m} 25.2^{s} / day
- Inclination: 3.8511°
- Longitude of ascending node: 23.848°
- Argument of perihelion: 51.247°

Physical characteristics
- Dimensions: 5.765±0.691 km 7.14 km (calculated)
- Synodic rotation period: 2.70876±0.00001 h 2.70888±0.00001 h 2.709±0.001 h
- Geometric albedo: 0.24 (assumed); 0.633±0.259
- Spectral type: S
- Absolute magnitude (H): 12.31 · 12.9 · 13.26±0.23

2080 Jihlava, provisional designation 1976 DG, is a stony Flora asteroid from the inner regions of the asteroid belt, approximately 6 kilometers in diameter. The asteroid was discovered on 27 February 1976, by Swiss astronomer Paul Wild at Zimmerwald Observatory near Bern, Switzerland. It was named after the Czech city of Jihlava.

== Orbit and classification ==
Jihlava is a member of the Flora family, one of the largest groups of stony asteroids in the main-belt. It orbits the Sun in the inner main-belt at a distance of 2.0–2.3 AU once every 3 years and 3 months (1,173 days). Its orbit has an eccentricity of 0.06 and an inclination of 4° with respect to the ecliptic.

In 1955, the asteroid was first identified as 1955 SH1 and 1955 SH2 at Goethe Link Observatory and Heidelberg Observatory, respectively, and thereby extending the body's observation arc by 21 years prior to its official discovery observation at Zimmerwald.

== Physical characteristics ==
The asteroid has been characterized as a common S-type asteroid.

The best rated rotational lightcurve of Jihlava gave rotation period of 2.70876 hours with a brightness variation of 0.15 magnitude (U=3).

According to the survey carried out by NASA's Wide-field Infrared Survey Explorer with its subsequent NEOWISE mission, Jihlava measures 5.765 kilometers in diameter and its surface has an outstandingly high albedo of 0.633, while the Collaborative Asteroid Lightcurve Link assumes an albedo of 0.24 — derived from 8 Flora, the family's largest member and namesake – and calculates a diameter of 7.14 kilometers with an absolute magnitude of 12.9.

== Naming ==
This minor planet was named after the city of Jihlava in the Czech Republic. The Moravian town, by the river of the same name was founded in the 11th century and is the country's oldest mining town with a community that prospered from rich silver deposits. The municipal and mining laws of Jihlava were to become a model for analogous regulations all over the world.

The name was proposed by astronomer Ivo Baueršíma, a geodesist at the University of Berne and co-discoverer of the minor planet 9711 Želetava, in honor of his native town. The official naming citation was published by the Minor Planet Center on 1 July 1979 (M.P.C. 4786).
