= NGC 4493 =

Galaxy in the constellation Virgo

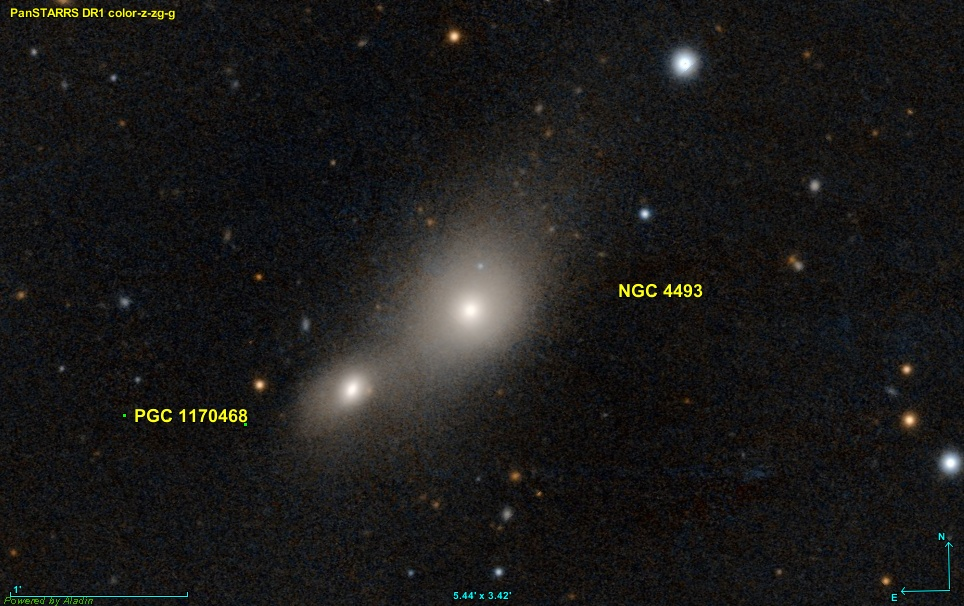
- NGC 4493 imaged by Pan-STARRS

Observation data (J2000 epoch)
- Constellation: Virgo
- Right ascension: 12^{h} 31^{m} 08.3699^{s}
- Declination: +00° 36′ 49.325″
- Redshift: 0.023083±0.00000934
- Heliocentric radial velocity: 6,920±3 km/s
- Distance: 355.28 ± 8.60 Mly (108.930 ± 2.638 Mpc)
- Apparent magnitude (V): 14.5g

Characteristics
- Type: E
- Size: ~178,600 ly (54.76 kpc) (estimated)
- Apparent size (V): 1.16′ × 0.74′

Other designations
- 2MASX J12310835+0036496, MCG +00-32-017 NED01, PGC 41409, CGCG 014-056 NED01

NGC 4493 is a large elliptical galaxy in the constellation of Virgo. Its velocity with respect to the cosmic microwave background is 7,266±24 km/s, which corresponds to a Hubble distance of 349.5 ± 24.5 Mly (107.17 ± 7.51 Mpc). Additionally, 30 non-redshift measurements give a similar mean distance of 355.28 ± 8.60 Mly (108.930 ± 2.638 Mpc). It was discovered by German astronomer Albert Marth on 22 March 1865.

NGC 4493 is neighbored to the southeast by the elliptical galaxy PGC 1170468.

== Supernovae ==
Two supernovae have been observed in NGC 4493.

- SN 1994M (Type Ia, mag. 16) was discovered by Swiss Astronomer Paul Wild on 29 April 1994.
- SN 2004br (Type Ia-pec, mag. 16.3) was discovered by the Lick Observatory Supernova Search (LOSS) on 15 May 2004.

== See also ==
- List of NGC objects (4001–5000)
