= 2033 Basilea =

Main-belt asteroid

Discovery
- Discovered by: P. Wild
- Discovery site: Zimmerwald Obs.
- Discovery date: 6 February 1973

Designations
- Named after: Basel (Swiss city)
- Alternative designations: 1973 CA · 1953 DA; 1953 EY · 1955 WD; 1955 XD
- Minor planet category: main-belt · (inner)

Orbital characteristics
- Epoch 4 September 2017 (JD 2458000.5)
- Uncertainty parameter 0
- Observation arc: 63.33 yr (23,133 days)
- Aphelion: 2.4734 AU
- Perihelion: 1.9765 AU
- Semi-major axis: 2.2250 AU
- Eccentricity: 0.1117
- Orbital period (sidereal): 3.32 yr (1,212 days)
- Mean anomaly: 191.60°
- Mean motion: 0° 17^{m} 49.2^{s} / day
- Inclination: 8.4634°
- Longitude of ascending node: 321.72°
- Time of perihelion: 14 November 2025
- Argument of perihelion: 134.56°

Physical characteristics
- Dimensions: 5.710±0.088 km 6.25±1.51 km 6.322±0.051 km 7.82 km (calculated)
- Synodic rotation period: 6.5287±0.0002 h (Note: Pravec (2015) web: lightcurve plot of (2033) Basilea with a rotation period 6.5287±0.0002 hours with a brightness amplitude of 0.28 mag. Summary figures at Collaborative Asteroid Lightcurve Link (CALL) and Ondrejov Asteroid Photometry Project, also see data sheet.)
- Geometric albedo: 0.20 (assumed); 0.29±0.13; 0.3688±0.0966; 0.419±0.088
- Spectral type: S
- Apparent magnitude: 14.9 to 18.4
- Absolute magnitude (H): 12.7 · 12.9 · 13.01±0.09 · 13.19

2033 Basilea, provisional designation 1973 CA, is a stony asteroid from the inner regions of the asteroid belt, approximately 6 kilometers in diameter. It was discovered on 6 February 1973, by astronomer Paul Wild at the Zimmerwald Observatory near Bern, Switzerland. The asteroid was named for the Swiss city of Basel. It came to perihelion in November 2025 and opposition on 23 January 2026 at apparent magnitude 15 in the constellation of Cancer.

== Classification and orbit ==
Basilea orbits the Sun in the inner main-belt at a distance of 2.0–2.5 AU once every 3 years and 4 months (1,212 days). Its orbit has an eccentricity of 0.11 and an inclination of 8° with respect to the ecliptic.

The asteroid was first identified as 1953 DA at Goethe Link Observatory in February 1953, extending the body's observation arc by 20 years prior to its official discovery observation at Zimmerwakd.

== Physical characteristics ==
=== Lightcurves ===
In December 2015, a rotational lightcurve of Basilea was obtained from photometric observations by astronomers Petr Pravec, Peter Kušnirák and Donald Pray. Lightcurve analysis gave a rotation period of 6.5287 hours with a brightness variation of 0.28 magnitude (U=3-).

=== Diameter and albedo ===
According to the survey carried out by the NEOWISE mission of NASA's Wide-field Infrared Survey Explorer, Basilea measures between 5.710 and 6.322 kilometers in diameter and its surface has an albedo between 0.29 and 0.419.

The Collaborative Asteroid Lightcurve Link assumes a standard albedo for stony asteroids of 0.20 and calculates a diameter of 7.82 kilometers based on an absolute magnitude of 12.9.

== Naming ==
This minor planet was named for the Swiss city of Basel, as well as for the Astronomical Institute of the University of Basel on the occasion of its 50th anniversary. The approved naming citation was published by the Minor Planet Center on 1 June 1980 (M.P.C. 5359).
