= Paul Wild (Swiss astronomer) =

Swiss astronomer

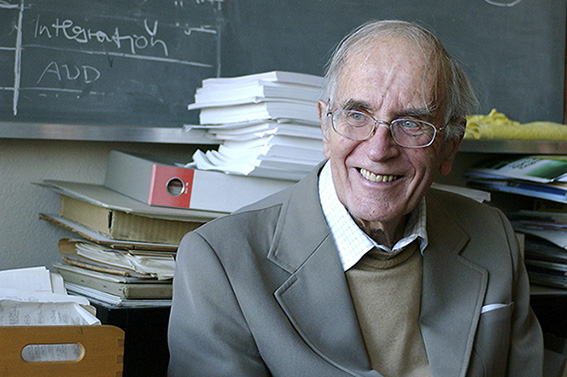
- Paul Wild at University of Bern in 2006
- Born: 5 October 1925; Wädenswil, Switzerland
- Died: 2 July 2014 (aged 88); Bern, Switzerland
- Education: ETH Zürich
- Known for: discoveries of comets and asteroids
- Scientific career
- Fields: Astronomy

Paul Wild (German: [ˈvɪlt]; 5 October 1925 – 2 July 2014) was a Swiss astronomer and director of the Astronomical Institute of the University of Bern, who discovered numerous comets, asteroids and supernovae.

== Biography ==
Wild was born on 5 October 1925 in the village of Wädenswil near Zürich, Switzerland. From 1944 through 1950, he studied mathematics and physics at the ETH Zurich. Thereafter, he worked at the California Institute of Technology where he researched galaxies and supernovas under the leadership of countryman Fritz Zwicky from 1951 through 1955.

At the Zimmerwald Observatory, near Bern, Wild made his first cometary discovery C/1957 U1 (1957 IX) on 2 October 1957. The parabolic comet was later named "Latyshev-Wild–Burnham".

Professor Wild became director of the Astronomical Institute of the University of Bern in 1980, and remained in this position until 1991. He died on 2 July 2014 at the age of 88 in Bern.

== Discoveries ==
During countless nights Wild observed the skies at the Zimmerwald Observatory near Bern and discovered numerous asteroids, comets and supernovae including:

- 4 periodic comets: 63P/Wild, 81P/Wild, 86P/Wild and 116P/Wild
- 3 parabolic comets: C/1957 U1, C/1967 C2 and C/1968 U1
- The Apollo asteroid 1866 Sisyphus and the two Amor asteroids 2368 Beltrovata and 3552 Don Quixote
- 41 supernovae, as well as 8 co-discoveries. His first discovered supernova was SN 1954A in NGC 4214, while his most recent was SN 1994M in NGC 4493.

The best-known discovery of a comet occurred on 6 January 1978. This Jupiter-family comet was designated 1978 XI, P/Wild 2 or 81P/Wild. Wild 2 was chosen by NASA for its Stardust mission launched in 1999. The stardust spacecraft flew through the comet's trail and collected samples of the tail's dust. After the return of the spacecraft to Earth, analysis of the dust particles by different researcher provided new insights about the evolution of the Solar System. Organic compounds such as glycine, a fundamental chemical building block of life, were found on a comet for the first time. In addition, evidence of the presence of liquid water was detected.

=== List of discovered asteroids ===
He is credited by the Minor Planet Center with the discovery of 94 numbered minor planets during 1961–1994, one of which was a co-discovery with Czech-born Swiss astronomer Ivo Baueršíma.

1657 Roemera	6 March 1961	list
1687 Glarona	19 September 1965	list
1748 Mauderli	7 September 1966	list
1768 Appenzella	23 September 1965	list
1773 Rumpelstilz	17 April 1968	list
1775 Zimmerwald	13 May 1969	list
1803 Zwicky	6 February 1967	list
1830 Pogson	17 April 1968	list
1831 Nicholson	17 April 1968	list
1838 Ursa	20 October 1971	list
1839 Ragazza	20 October 1971	list
1844 Susilva	30 October 1972	list
1845 Helewalda	30 October 1972	list
1860 Barbarossa	28 September 1973	list
1866 Sisyphus	5 December 1972	list
1891 Gondola	11 September 1969	list
1892 Lucienne	16 September 1971	list
1893 Jakoba	20 October 1971	list
1906 Naef	5 September 1972	list
1911 Schubart	25 October 1973	list

1935 Lucerna	2 September 1973	list
1936 Lugano	24 November 1973	list
1937 Locarno	19 December 1973	list
1938 Lausanna	19 April 1974	list
1960 Guisan	25 October 1973	list
1961 Dufour	19 November 1973	list
1962 Dunant	24 November 1973	list
2001 Einstein	5 March 1973	list
2005 Hencke	2 September 1973	list
2029 Binomi	11 September 1969	list
2033 Basilea	6 February 1973	list
2034 Bernoulli	5 March 1973	list
2037 Tripaxeptalis	25 October 1973	list
2038 Bistro	24 November 1973	list
2040 Chalonge	19 April 1974	list
2080 Jihlava	27 February 1976	list
2081 Sázava	27 February 1976	list
2087 Kochera	28 December 1975	list
2088 Sahlia	27 February 1976	list
2129 Cosicosi	27 September 1973	list

2138 Swissair	17 April 1968	list
2151 Hadwiger	3 November 1977	list
2152 Hannibal	19 November 1978	list
2175 Andrea Doria	12 October 1977	list
2218 Wotho	10 January 1975	list
2229 Mezzarco	7 September 1977	list
2239 Paracelsus	13 September 1978	list
2262 Mitidika	10 September 1978	list
2303 Retsina	24 March 1979	list
2320 Blarney	29 August 1979	list
2337 Boubin	22 October 1976	list
2353 Alva	27 October 1975	list
2368 Beltrovata	4 September 1977	list
2429 Schürer	12 October 1977	list
2481 Bürgi	18 October 1977	list
2517 Orma	28 September 1968	list
2521 Heidi	28 February 1979	list
2565 Grögler	12 October 1977	list
2731 Cucula	21 May 1982	list
2843 Yeti	7 December 1975	list

2868 Upupa	30 October 1972	list
2914 Glärnisch	19 September 1965	list
2950 Rousseau	9 November 1974	list
2970 Pestalozzi	27 October 1978	list
2989 Imago	22 October 1976	list
3021 Lucubratio	6 February 1967	list
3026 Sarastro	12 October 1977	list
3060 Delcano	12 September 1982	list
3258 Somnium	8 September 1983	list
3329 Golay	12 September 1985	list
3468 Urgenta	7 January 1975	list
3491 Fridolin	30 September 1984	list
3552 Don Quixote	26 September 1983	list
3582 Cyrano	2 October 1986	list
3928 Randa	4 August 1981	list
4323 Hortulus	27 August 1981	list
4471 Graculus	8 November 1978	list
5369 Virgiugum	22 September 1985	list
5708 Melancholia	12 October 1977	list
5710 Silentium	18 October 1977	list

5986 Xenophon	2 October 1969	list
6475 Refugium	29 September 1987	list
6620 Peregrina	25 October 1973	list
7081 Ludibunda	30 August 1987	list
8061 Gaudium	27 October 1975	list
(9149) 1977 TD1	12 October 1977	list
(9302) 1985 TB_{3}	12 October 1985	list
9711 Želetava	7 August 1972	list^{[A]}
9716 Severina	27 October 1975	list
(10488) 1985 RS_{1}	12 September 1985	list
13025 Zürich	28 January 1989	list
14826 Nicollier	16 September 1985	list
(16415) 1987 QE_{7}	21 August 1987	list
19251 Totziens	3 September 1994	list
Co-discovery made with:^{A} I. Baueršíma

== See also ==
- List of minor planet discoverers
