= 2038 Bistro =

Main-belt asteroid

Discovery
- Discovered by: P. Wild
- Discovery site: Zimmerwald Obs.
- Discovery date: 24 November 1973

Designations
- Pronunciation: /ˈbiːstroʊ/
- Named after: Bistro (Small restaurant; French)
- Alternative designations: 1973 WF · 1941 KD
- Minor planet category: main-belt · (inner)

Orbital characteristics
- Epoch 4 September 2017 (JD 2458000.5)
- Uncertainty parameter 0
- Observation arc: 43.53 yr (15,899 days)
- Aphelion: 2.6556 AU
- Perihelion: 2.2139 AU
- Semi-major axis: 2.4347 AU
- Eccentricity: 0.0907
- Orbital period (sidereal): 3.80 yr (1,388 days)
- Mean anomaly: 5.0403°
- Mean motion: 0° 15^{m} 33.84^{s} / day
- Inclination: 14.809°
- Longitude of ascending node: 73.475°
- Argument of perihelion: 183.69°

Physical characteristics
- Dimensions: 10.55±0.76 km 10.959±0.083 km 11.82±2.64 km 12.192±0.028 km 12.58±1.2 km 12.69 km (derived); 13.52±0.37 km
- Synodic rotation period: 7.88 h (dated); 7.89 h (dated) (Note: DeGraff-2003b: unpublished lightcurve data for (2038) Bistro. Summary figures at Collaborative Asteroid Lightcurve Link (CALL)); 8 h (dated); 17.051±0.006 h
- Geometric albedo: 0.1342±0.030; 0.1433±0.0218; 0.168±0.032; 0.1739 (derived); 0.191±0.029; 0.25±0.10
- Spectral type: SMASS = Sa · S
- Absolute magnitude (H): 11.90 · 12.0 · 12.3 · 12.39±0.46

2038 Bistro (/ˈbiːstroʊ/), provisional designation 1973 WF, is a stony asteroid from the inner regions of the asteroid belt, approximately 12 kilometers in diameter. The asteroid was discovered on 24 November 1973, by Swiss astronomer Paul Wild at the Zimmerwald Observatory near Bern, Switzerland. It was named for the Bistro restaurant.

== Orbit and classification ==
Bistro orbits the Sun in the inner main-belt at a distance of 2.2–2.7 AU once every 3 years and 10 months (1,388 days). Its orbit has an eccentricity of 0.09 and an inclination of 15° with respect to the ecliptic. The asteroid's observation arc begins with its official discovery observation at Zimmerwald.

== Physical characteristics ==
In the SMASS classification, Bistro is a Sa-type asteroid, which transitions from the common S-types to the A-type asteroids.

=== Lightcurves ===
In April 2013, a rotational lightcurve of Bistro was obtained from photometric observations at the Bassano Bresciano Observatory in Italy. Lightcurve analysis gave a rotation period of 17.051 hours with a brightness variation of 0.12 magnitude (U=2-).

The results supersede three previously published results from fragmentary lightcurves that gave a much shorter period between 7.88 and 8 hours (U=1/1/1).

=== Diameter and albedo ===
According to the surveys carried out by the Japanese Akari satellite and NASA's Wide-field Infrared Survey Explorer with its subsequent NEOWISE mission, Bistro measures between 10.55 and 13.52 kilometers in diameter and its surface has an albedo between 0.1342 and 0.25.

The Collaborative Asteroid Lightcurve Link derives an albedo of 0.1739 and a diameter of 12.69 kilometers based on an absolute magnitude of 12.0.

== Naming ==
This minor planet was named Bistro, the small type of restaurant that originated from Paris. As with the precedingly numbered 2037 Tripaxeptalis, the name may also alludes to a numbers game, this time to 1019 Strackea, as (2038) = 2 × (1019) Strackea. The approved naming citation was published by the Minor Planet Center on 1 June 1980 (M.P.C. 5359).
