= 2368 Beltrovata =

Near-Earth asteroid

Discovery
- Discovered by: P. Wild
- Discovery site: Zimmerwald Obs.
- Discovery date: 4 September 1977

Designations
- Named after: Betty Tendering (friend of Gottfried Keller)
- Alternative designations: 1977 RA
- Minor planet category: NEO · Amor

Orbital characteristics
- Epoch 4 September 2017 (JD 2458000.5)
- Uncertainty parameter 0
- Observation arc: 38.65 yr (14,117 days)
- Aphelion: 2.9751 AU
- Perihelion: 1.2356 AU
- Semi-major axis: 2.1054 AU
- Eccentricity: 0.4131
- Orbital period (sidereal): 3.05 yr (1,116 days)
- Mean anomaly: 39.633°
- Mean motion: 0° 19^{m} 21.36^{s} / day
- Inclination: 5.2222°
- Longitude of ascending node: 287.34°
- Argument of perihelion: 43.081°
- Earth MOID: 0.2334 AU · 90.9 LD

Physical characteristics
- Dimensions: 2.3 km 2.70 km (calculated); 3.003±0.493 km
- Synodic rotation period: 5.9 h
- Geometric albedo: 0.161±0.081; 0.20 (assumed); 0.27
- Spectral type: Tholen = SQ · S B–V = 0.830; U–B = 0.520
- Absolute magnitude (H): 15.21 · 15.33±0.40

2368 Beltrovata, provisional designation 1977 RA, is an eccentric stony asteroid and near-Earth object of the Amor group, approximately 2.7 kilometers in diameter. It was discovered on 4 September 1977, by Swiss astronomer Paul Wild at Zimmerwald Observatory near Bern, Switzerland. The asteroid was named for Betty Tendering, a friend of author Gottfried Keller.

== Orbit and classification ==
Beltrovata orbits the Sun in the inner main-belt at a distance of 1.2–3.0 AU once every 3 years and 1 month (1,116 days). Its orbit has an eccentricity of 0.41 and an inclination of 5° with respect to the ecliptic.

As an Amor asteroid, it approaches the orbit of Earth from the outside but does not cross it. It has an Earth minimum orbit intersection distance of 0.2334 AU (34,900,000 km), which corresponds to 90.9 lunar distances. The asteroid's observation arc began with its official discovering observation at Zimmerwald.

== Physical characteristics ==
In the Tholen classification Beltrovata is a SQ-type asteroid, an intermediate between the common S-type and Q-type asteroids.

=== Rotation period ===
A first rotational lightcurve of Beltrovata was obtained from photoelectric observations made by U.S. astronomers Edward Bowell and Schelte Bus in the 1970s (IAUC 3111), and gave a rotation period of 5.9 hours with a brightness variation of 0.84 magnitude (U=n.a.). In 2000, the Near-Earth Objects Follow-up Program published an identical period but with a higher amplitude of 1.05 magnitude.(U=2).

=== Diameter and albedo ===
According to the space-based survey carried out by the NEOWISE mission of NASA's Wide-field Infrared Survey Explorer, the asteroid measures 3.0 kilometers in diameter and its surface has an albedo of 0.16, while the Collaborative Asteroid Lightcurve Link assumes a standard albedo for stony asteroids of 0.20 and calculates a diameter of 2.7 kilometers with an absolute magnitude of 15.21.

== Naming ==
This minor planet is named "Beltrovata", which is the name by whom the Swiss author Gottfried Keller from Zürich called his friend Betty Tendering. She served as role model for the character of "Dortchen Schönfund" in Keller's novel Green Henry. The official naming citation was published by the Minor Planet Center on 1 August 1981 (M.P.C. 6209).
