= 1775 Zimmerwald =

Main-belt asteroid

Discovery
- Discovered by: P. Wild
- Discovery site: Zimmerwald Obs.
- Discovery date: 13 May 1969

Designations
- Named after: Zimmerwald (village; observatory)
- Alternative designations: 1969 JA · 1952 HB_{2} 1952 HD · 1953 TE_{2}
- Minor planet category: main-belt · Eunomia

Orbital characteristics
- Epoch 4 September 2017 (JD 2458000.5)
- Uncertainty parameter 0
- Observation arc: 67.20 yr (24,545 days)
- Aphelion: 3.0866 AU
- Perihelion: 2.1182 AU
- Semi-major axis: 2.6024 AU
- Eccentricity: 0.1861
- Orbital period (sidereal): 4.20 yr (1,533 days)
- Mean anomaly: 148.54°
- Mean motion: 0° 14^{m} 5.28^{s} / day
- Inclination: 12.555°
- Longitude of ascending node: 195.94°
- Argument of perihelion: 84.725°

Physical characteristics
- Dimensions: 10.17±0.69 km 10.232±0.088 km 10.70±2.19 km 11.03 km (calculated)
- Synodic rotation period: 122±5 h
- Geometric albedo: 0.21 (assumed); 0.21±0.09; 0.244±0.041; 0.247±0.035
- Spectral type: S
- Absolute magnitude (H): 12.08±0.31 · 12.1 · 12.26

1775 Zimmerwald, provisional designation 1969 JA, is a stony Eunomian asteroid and slow rotator from the middle region of the asteroid belt, approximately 10 kilometers in diameter. It was discovered on 13 May 1969, by Swiss astronomer Paul Wild at Zimmerwald Observatory near Bern, Switzerland. It is named for the village of Zimmerwald, where the discovering observatory is located.

== Orbit and classification ==
Zimmerwald is a member of the Eunomia family, a large group of mostly stony S-type asteroids and the most prominent family in the intermediate main-belt, which is located between two prominent Kirkwood gaps. It orbits the Sun in the central main-belt at a distance of 2.1–3.1 AU once every 4 years and 2 months (1,533 days). Its orbit has an eccentricity of 0.19 and an inclination of 13° with respect to the ecliptic. The first precovery of Zimmerwald was taken at Palomar Observatory in 1949, extending the body's observation arc by 20 years prior to its official discovery observation at Zimmerwald. During the 1950s, it was also identified at Heidelberg, Goethe Link and McDonald Observatory.

== Physical characteristics ==
=== Rotation period ===
In May 2011, a rotational lightcurve of Zimmerwald was obtained by American astronomer Robert Stephens at the Center for Solar System Studies, California, using photometric observations taken at the Santana and Goat Mountain observatories (646, G79). Lightcurve analysis gave a very long rotation period of 122±5 hours with a change in brightness of 0.60 magnitude (U=2+). It is also suspected, that the body might be in a nonprincipal axis rotation, which is commonly known as "tumbling". While the slowest rotators have periods above 1000 hours, the majority of minor planets have periods shorter than 20 hours.

=== Diameter and albedo ===
According to the surveys carried out by the Japanese Akari satellite and NASA's Wide-field Infrared Survey Explorer with its subsequent NEOWISE mission, Zimmerwald measures 10.17 and 10.70 kilometers in diameter, and its surface has an albedo between of 0.244 and 0.21, respectively (without preliminary results). The Collaborative Asteroid Lightcurve Link assumes an albedo of 0.21 – derived from 15 Eunomia, the family's largest member and namesake – and calculates a diameter of 11.03 kilometers using an absolute magnitude of 12.1.

== Naming ==
This minor planet was named for the small village of Zimmerwald, location of the discovering Zimmerwald Observatory. It is located about seven miles south of the Swiss capital Bern, after which the binary asteroid 1313 Berna was named. The official naming citation was published by the Minor Planet Center on 18 April 1977 (M.P.C. 4155).
