= 3552 Don Quixote =

Eccentric near-Earth asteroid

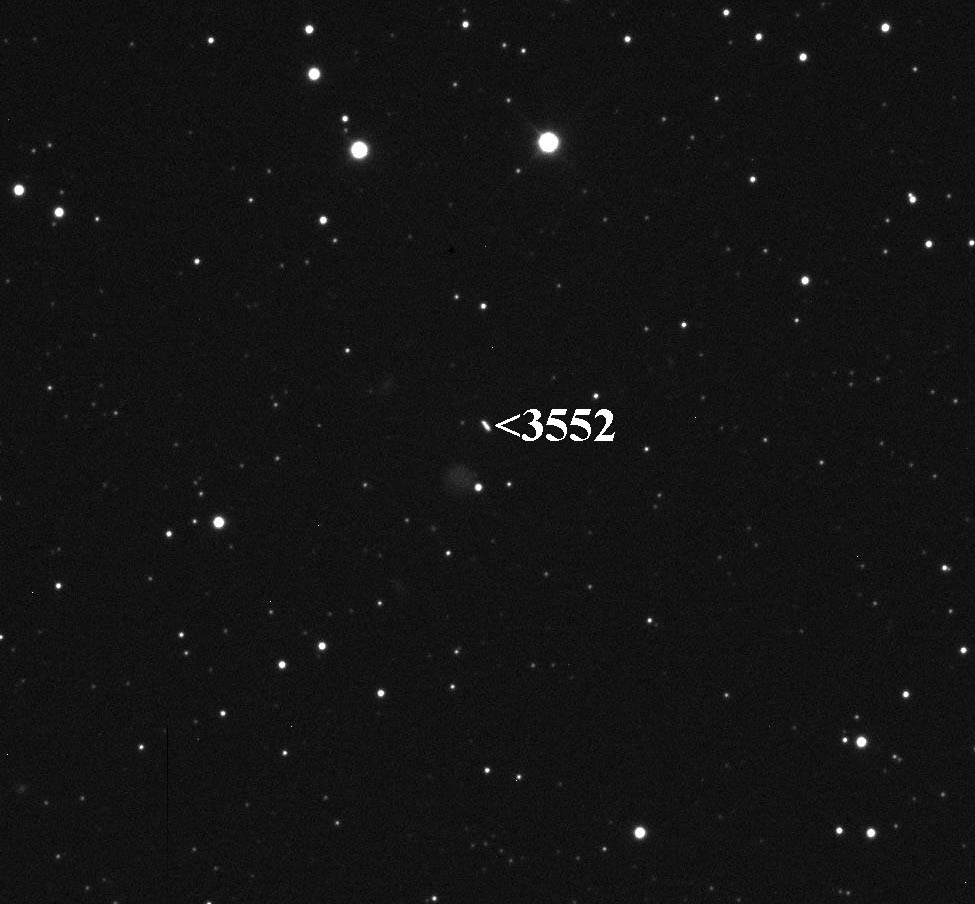
- Don Quixote (apmag 15) near perihelion taken in Pingelly, Australia, 2009

Discovery
- Discovered by: P. Wild
- Discovery site: Zimmerwald Obs.
- Discovery date: 26 September 1983

Designations
- Named after: Don Quixote (fictional character)
- Alternative designations: 1983 SA
- Minor planet category: NEO · Amor; Mars-crosser; Jupiter-crosser; Centaur

Orbital characteristics
- Epoch 4 September 2017 (JD 2458000.5)
- Uncertainty parameter 0
- Observation arc: 33.71 yr (12,312 days)
- Aphelion: 7.2783 AU
- Perihelion: 1.2399 AU
- Semi-major axis: 4.2591 AU
- Eccentricity: 0.7089
- Orbital period (sidereal): 8.79 yr (3,211 days)
- Mean anomaly: 332.47°
- Mean motion: 0° 6^{m} 43.56^{s} / day
- Inclination: 31.092°
- Longitude of ascending node: 350.03°
- Argument of perihelion: 316.42°
- Earth MOID: 0.3338 AU
- Jupiter MOID: 0.4397 AU
- T_{Jupiter}: 2.3150

Physical characteristics
- Dimensions: 18.4±0.4 km
- Synodic rotation period: 7.7 h (0.32 d)
- Geometric albedo: 0.03
- Spectral type: D (Tholen) · D (SMASS)
- Apparent magnitude: 11.67 (1957) to 22.32 (Note: Magnitudes generated with JPL Horizons for the year 1950 through 2100)
- Absolute magnitude (H): 12.9

3552 Don Quixote, provisionally designated 1983 SA, is an exceptionally eccentric asteroid, classified as a near-Earth object of the Amor group, Mars-crosser and Jupiter-crosser, as well as a weakly active comet.

== Discovery and naming ==
The asteroid was discovered on 26 September 1983, by Swiss astronomer Paul Wild at Zimmerwald Observatory near Bern, Switzerland. It was named after the comic knight who is the eponymous hero of Cervantes' Spanish novel Don Quixote (1605). The approved naming citation was published by the Minor Planet Center on 2 December 1990 (M.P.C. 17466).

== Orbit and characteristics ==
Don Quixote is characterized as a dark D-type asteroid in the Tholen and SMASS taxonomy.

It has a highly inclined comet-like orbit of 31 degrees that leads to frequent perturbations by Jupiter. Don Quixote measures 18.4 kilometres in diameter and has a rotation period of 7.7 hours.

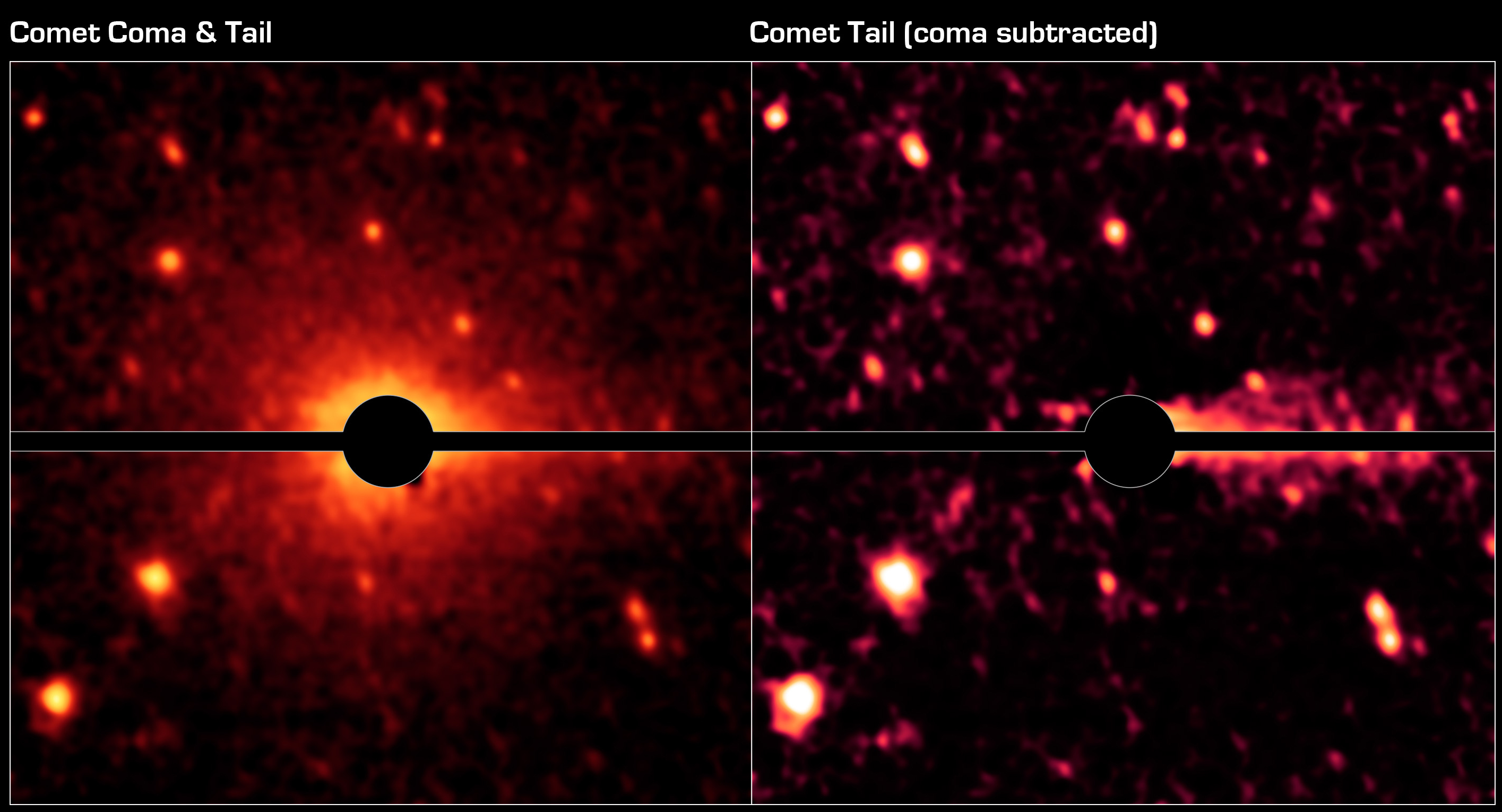
Don Quixote by Spitzer Space Telescope, featuring its coma and tail.

Due to its comet-like orbit and albedo, Don Quixote has been suspected to be an extinct comet. However, infrared observations with the Spitzer Space Telescope at 4.5 μm revealed a faint coma and tail around the object. The cometary activity is inferred by carbon dioxide (CO_{2}) molecular band emission. In March 2018 a tail was observed at visible wavelengths for the first time. The observation of cometary features during two apparitions suggests that cometary activity is recurrent and Don Quixote is most likely a weakly active comet.
