= 19982 Barbaradoore =

Asteroid

Discovery
- Discovered by: E. F. Helin
- Discovery site: Palomar Obs.
- Discovery date: 22 January 1990

Designations
- Named after: Barbara Doore (discoverer's cousin)
- Alternative designations: 1990 BJ · 1983 AD_{2}
- Minor planet category: Mars crosser main-belt · Phocaea

Orbital characteristics
- Epoch 4 September 2017 (JD 2458000.5)
- Uncertainty parameter 0
- Observation arc: 33.36 yr (12,186 days)
- Aphelion: 3.0039 AU
- Perihelion: 1.6657 AU
- Semi-major axis: 2.3348 AU
- Eccentricity: 0.2866
- Orbital period (sidereal): 3.57 yr (1,303 days)
- Mean anomaly: 307.09°
- Mean motion: 0° 16^{m} 34.68^{s} / day
- Inclination: 22.325°
- Longitude of ascending node: 290.03°
- Argument of perihelion: 106.86°

Physical characteristics
- Dimensions: 3.88±0.63 km 4.668±0.120 km 5.02±0.14 km 5.66 km (calculated)
- Synodic rotation period: 3.3162±0.0003 h (Note: Pravec (2010): lightcurve plot of (19982) Barbaradoore with a rotation period of 3.3162±0.0003 hours and a brightness amplitude of 0.28 mag. CALL assigns a quality-code of Q=3, which denotes a "secure result within the precision given and no ambiguity". Summary figures at Collaborative Asteroid Lightcurve Link (CALL) and Ondrejov Asteroid Photometry Project – Pravec, P.; Wolf, M.; Sarounova, L. (2010))
- Geometric albedo: 0.20 (assumed); 0.306±0.040; 0.3540±0.0784; 0.42±0.21
- Spectral type: S (assumed)
- Absolute magnitude (H): 13.13±0.47 · 13.4; 13.5 · 13.6

19982 Barbaradoore (provisional designation 1990 BJ) is an eccentric, stony Phocaea asteroid and a recent Mars-crosser from the inner regions of the asteroid belt, approximately 5 kilometers in diameter. It was discovered on 22 January 1990, by American astronomer Eleanor Helin at the Palomar Observatory in California, United States. The asteroid was named after Barbara Doore, a cousin of the discoverer.

== Orbit and classification ==
When applying the Hierarchical Clustering Method to its proper orbital elements, Barbaradoore is a member of the Phocaea family (701), a large family of stony S-type asteroids with nearly two thousand known members. It orbits the Sun in the inner main-belt at a distance of 1.7–3.0 AU once every 3 years and 7 months (1,303 days). Its orbit has an eccentricity of 0.29 and an inclination of 22° with respect to the ecliptic.

=== Recent Mars-crosser and disparate criteria ===
As of 2017, Barbaradoore has become a Mars-crossing asteroid (MCA), a dynamically unstable group between the main belt and the near-Earth populations, because its perihelion is at 1.6657, declining from 1.6662 AU just the year before. In the JPL Small-Body Database, an asteroid's perihelion has to be smaller than 1.666 AU in order to classify as MCA, while in the Lightcurve Data Base, that limit is defined at 1.668 AU. (Note: The JPL Small-Body Database uses the following orbital criteria to define a Mars-crossing asteroid: A perihelion that is between 1.3 and 1.666 AU with a semi-major axis that is not greater than 3.2 AU, see JPL's Orbit Classification)

As of 2017, the Minor Planet Center does not classify Barbaradoore as an MCA, due to a differently defined threshold-perihelion of 1.6600 AU. It therefore remains an unspecified main-belt asteroid. Before 2017, when Barbaradoore's orbit did not yet cross that of Mars, it was an outer Mars grazer.

== Physical characteristics ==
Barbaradoore is an assumed stony S-type asteroid, which agrees with the overall spectral type for members of the Phocaea family.

=== Lightcurve ===
In July 2010, a rotational lightcurve of Barbaradoore was obtained from photometric observation by Czech astronomer Petr Pravec at Ondřejov Observatory. Lightcurve analysis gave a well-defined rotation period of 3.3162 hours with a brightness variation of 0.28 magnitude (U=3).

=== Diameter and albedo ===
According to the surveys carried out by NASA's Wide-field Infrared Survey Explorer and its subsequent NEOWISE mission, Barbaradoore has a high albedo between 0.306 and 0.42 with a corresponding diameter of 3.88 to 5.02 kilometers, while the Collaborative Asteroid Lightcurve Link assumes a standard albedo for stony asteroids of 0.20 and calculates a diameter of 5.66 kilometers with an absolute magnitude of 13.6.

==== Comparison ====
With a diameter of approximately 5 kilometers, Barbaradoore is one of the smallest sizable Mars-crossing asteroids compared to 1065 Amundsenia (9.75 km), 1139 Atami (9.35 km), 1508 Kemi (17 km), 1011 Laodamia (7.39 km), 1727 Mette (est 9 km), 1131 Porzia (7.13 km), 1235 Schorria (est. 9 km), 985 Rosina (8.18 km) 1310 Villigera (15.24 km), and 1468 Zomba (7 km); and much smaller than the largest members of this dynamical group, namely, 132 Aethra, 323 Brucia, 2204 Lyyli and 512 Taurinensis, which are larger than 20 kilometers in diameter.

== Naming ==
This minor planet was named after a cousin of the discoverer, Barbara Hendricks Doore (born 1933). She is described by the discoverer as an admirer of sports and as an appreciated leader and volunteer, who has dedicated much of her time at Cathedral City's Boys and Girls Club in California. The official naming citation was published by the Minor Planet Center on 24 June 2002 (M.P.C. 46012).
