= 2490 Bussolini =

Asteroid

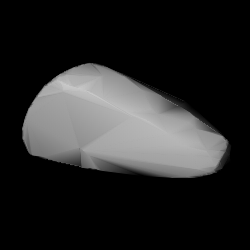
- Shape model of Bussolini from its lightcurve

Discovery
- Discovered by: Felix Aguilar Obs.
- Discovery site: El Leoncito Complex
- Discovery date: 3 January 1976

Designations
- Named after: Juan Bussolini (Argentine Jesuit physicist)
- Alternative designations: 1976 AG · 1962 WN_{2} 1977 KK · 1978 NT_{3} 1978 QH
- Minor planet category: main-belt · Eunomia

Orbital characteristics
- Epoch 4 September 2017 (JD 2458000.5)
- Uncertainty parameter 0
- Observation arc: 67.13 yr (24,519 days)
- Aphelion: 2.9567 AU
- Perihelion: 2.2617 AU
- Semi-major axis: 2.6092 AU
- Eccentricity: 0.1332
- Orbital period (sidereal): 4.21 yr (1,539 days)
- Mean anomaly: 9.8678°
- Mean motion: 0° 14^{m} 2.04^{s} / day
- Inclination: 12.964°
- Longitude of ascending node: 212.60°
- Argument of perihelion: 210.46°

Physical characteristics
- Mean diameter: 11.725±0.081 km 12.707±0.170 km 12.09 km (calculated)
- Synodic rotation period: 24 h
- Geometric albedo: 0.1918±0.0207; 0.21 (assumed); 0.223±0.043
- Spectral type: P · S
- Absolute magnitude (H): 11.9

2490 Bussolini (prov. designation: 1976 AG) is an Eunomia asteroid from the central region of the asteroid belt, approximately 12 kilometers (7.5 miles) in diameter. It was discovered on 3 January 1976, by staff members of the Félix Aguilar Observatory at El Leoncito Complex in Argentina. The asteroid was named after Argentine Jesuit physicist Juan Bussolini.

== Classification and orbit ==
Bussolini is a member of the Eunomia family, a large group of typically stony asteroids and the most prominent family in the intermediate main-belt. It orbits the Sun at a distance of 2.3–3.0 AU once every 4 years and 3 months (1,539 days). Its orbit has an eccentricity of 0.13 and an inclination of 13° with respect to the ecliptic. A first precovery was taken at Palomar Observatory in 1949, extending the body's observation arc by 27 years prior to its official discovery observation at El Leoncito.

== Naming ==
This minor planet was named in memory Argentine Jesuit and solar physicist Juan Antonio Bussolini (1905–1966), director of the Observatorio de Fisica Cosmica de San Miguel and a noted supporter of the Felix Aguilar Observatory. The approved naming citation was published by the Minor Planet Centeron 15 May 1984 (M.P.C. 8800).

== Physical characteristics ==
Eunomians are typically S-type asteroid. Bussolini has also been characterized as a P-type asteroid by the Wide-field Infrared Survey Explorer (WISE).

=== Lightcurve ===
In October 2008, a rotational lightcurve of Bussolini was obtained from photometric observations by French amateur astronomer Pierre Antonini. Analysis of the fragmentary lightcurve gave a somewhat longer than average rotation period of 24 hours with a brightness variation of 0.1 magnitude (U=1). As of 2017, no improved period has been obtained.

=== Diameter and albedo ===
According to the surveys carried out by NASA's WISE observatory with its subsequent NEOWISE mission, Bussolini measures 11.725 and 12.707 kilometers in diameter and its surface has an albedo of 0.223 and 0.1918, respectively. The Collaborative Asteroid Lightcurve Link assumes an albedo of 0.21 – derived from 15 Eunomia, the family's largest member and namesake – and calculates a diameter of 12.09 kilometers with an absolute magnitude of 11.9.
