= 2034 Bernoulli =

Main-belt asteroid

Discovery
- Discovered by: P. Wild
- Discovery site: Zimmerwald Obs.
- Discovery date: 5 March 1973

Designations
- Pronunciation: /bərˈnuːli/
- Named after: Bernoulli family (Jacob, Johann, Daniel)
- Alternative designations: 1973 EE · 1941 SQ; 1958 XT · 1978 VT_{13}
- Minor planet category: main-belt · (inner)

Orbital characteristics
- Epoch 4 September 2017 (JD 2458000.5)
- Uncertainty parameter 0
- Observation arc: 65.74 yr (24,012 days)
- Aphelion: 2.6516 AU
- Perihelion: 1.8408 AU
- Semi-major axis: 2.2462 AU
- Eccentricity: 0.1805
- Orbital period (sidereal): 3.37 yr (1,230 days)
- Mean anomaly: 149.50°
- Mean motion: 0° 17^{m} 34.08^{s} / day
- Inclination: 8.5541°
- Longitude of ascending node: 19.055°
- Argument of perihelion: 64.138°

Physical characteristics
- Dimensions: 7.780±0.102; 8.483±0.050 km 9.40 km (calculated)
- Synodic rotation period: 6.248±0.001 h
- Geometric albedo: 0.1710±0.0333; 0.20 (assumed); 0.220±0.051
- Spectral type: S
- Absolute magnitude (H): 12.5 · 12.9

2034 Bernoulli (/bərˈnuːli/), provisional designation 1973 EE, is a stony asteroid from the inner regions of the asteroid belt, approximately 9 kilometers in diameter.

The asteroid was discovered on 5 March 1973, by Swiss astronomer Paul Wild at Zimmerwald Observatory near Bern, Switzerland, and named for the members of the Bernoulli family.

== Orbit and classification ==
Bernoulli orbits the Sun in the inner main-belt at a distance of 1.8–2.7 AU once every 3 years and 4 months (1,230 days). Its orbit has an eccentricity of 0.18 and an inclination of 9° with respect to the ecliptic. The first used precovery was taken at Palomar Observatory in 1951, extending the asteroid's observation arc by 22 years prior to its official discovery, while the first unused observation was made ten years earlier at Uccle Observatory in 1941.

== Physical characteristics ==
Bernoulli is an assumed, common, stony S-type asteroid.

=== Rotation period ===
A rotational lightcurve of Bernoulli was obtained from photometric observations by Michael Alkema at the U.S. Elephant Head Observatory (G35), Arizona, in December 2012. Lightcurve analysis gave a rotation period of 6.248 hours with a brightness variation of 0.21 magnitude (U=2+).

=== Diameter and albedo ===
According to the survey carried out by the NEOWISE mission of NASA's space-based Wide-field Infrared Survey Explorer, Bernoulli measures 7.8 and 8.5 kilometers in diameter and its surface has an albedo of 0.17 and 0.22, respectively, while the Collaborative Asteroid Lightcurve Link assumes a standard albedo for stony asteroids of 0.20 and calculates a diameter of 9.4 kilometers with an absolute magnitude of 12.5.

== Naming ==
This minor planet was named in honour of the Bernoulli family, a dynasty of mathematicians from the city of Basel, Switzerland. In particular, Jacob Bernoulli (1654–1705), founder of the calculus of variations, Daniel Bernoulli (1700–1782), co-founder of hydrodynamics, and Johann Bernoulli (1667–1748), contributor to integral calculus and the teacher of Leonhard Euler, after whom the minor planet 2002 Euler is named.

The lunar crater Bernoulli also honors the Swiss dynasty. The official naming citation was published by the Minor Planet Center on 1 June 1980 (M.P.C. 5359).
