= Zimmerwald Observatory =

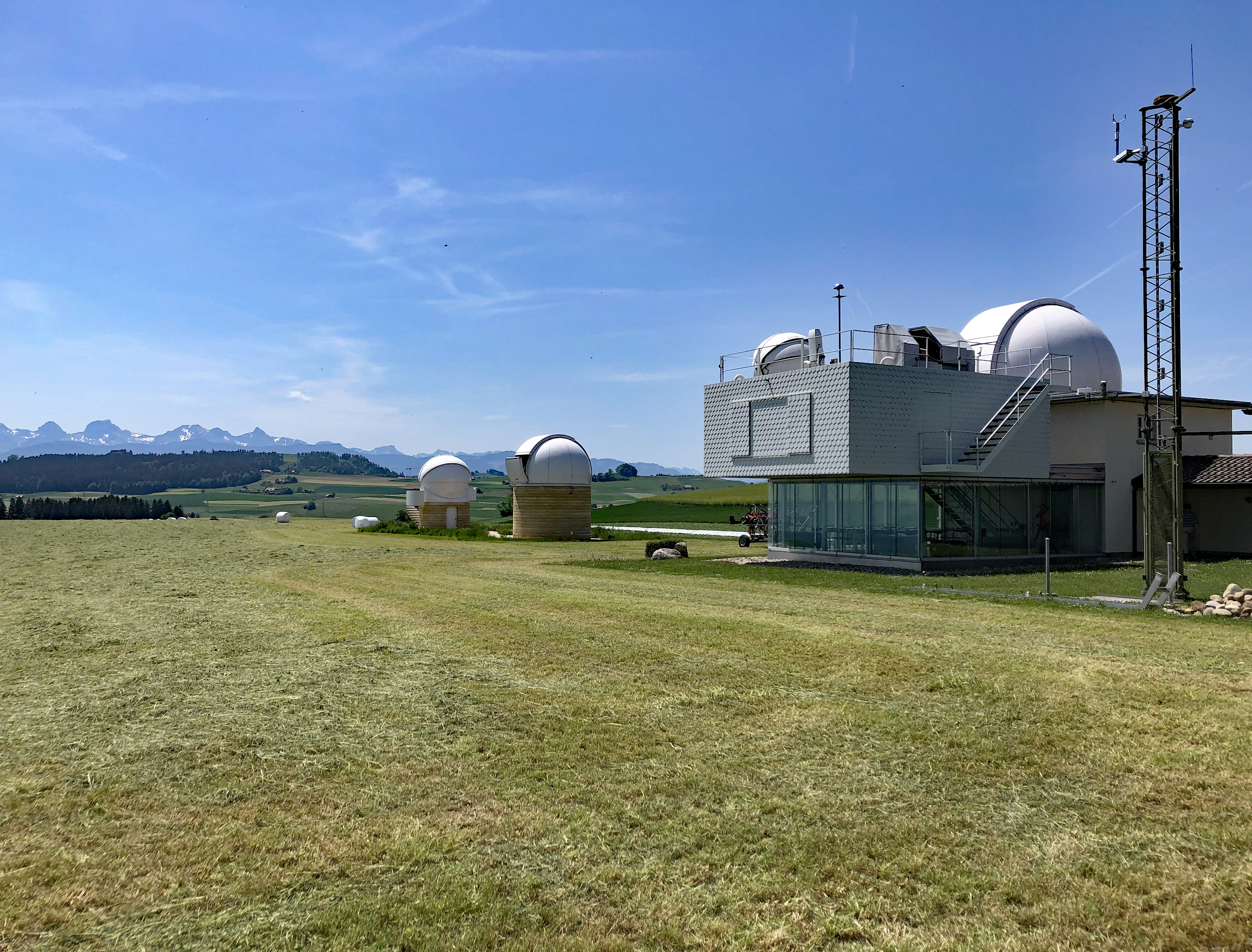
- The Zimmerwald Observatory in 2009
- Alternative names: AIUB
- Organization: University of Bern
- Observatory code: 026
- Location: near Zimmerwald, Canton of Bern, Switzerland
- Coordinates: 46.87667°N 7.46500°E
- Established: 1956
- Website: www.aiub.unibe.ch

Telescopes
- ZIMLAT: 1-meter Laser and Astrometric Telescope
- Related media on Commons

The Zimmerwald Observatory (German: Observatorium Zimmerwald) is an astronomical observatory owned and operated by the Institute of Astronomy of the University of Bern. It has five telescopes of various sizes.

== Location ==
The observatory is located at Zimmerwald, 10 kilometres south of Bern, Switzerland. It is situated on the Längenberg, a chain of hills. It offers a view of the Bernese Alps from 900 metres high.

== History ==
In 1922, the Institute of Astronomy at the University of Bern commenced its astronomical observations at the Muesmatt Observatory, also known as the Old Observatory. Though, this was unsuccessful due to air pollution and the observatory's low-lying position. In 1956, the observatory was moved to Zimmerwald, a high-altitude location that was considered an ideal choice for an observatory, due to its proximity to the city and freeness from the limitations of air and light pollution. In 1976 the compact small extension for the second dome with the ZIMLAT telescope was constructed. The 1-meter aperture ZIMLAT telescope was inaugurated in 1997. The 1m ZIMLAT telescope aims to observe satellites for 24 hours a day, weather permitting.

== Discoveries ==
Numerous comets and asteroids have been discovered by Paul Wild (1925–2014) at Zimmerwald Observatory, most notably comet 81P/Wild, which was visited by NASA's Stardust space probe in 2004. The main belt asteroid 1775 Zimmerwald has been named after the location of the observatory.

== See also ==
- List of largest optical reflecting telescopes
- Swiss Space Office
