= 2101 Adonis =

Asteroid

Discovery
- Discovered by: E. Delporte
- Discovery site: Uccle Obs.
- Discovery date: 12 February 1936

Designations
- Pronunciation: /əˈdoʊnɪs/, or /əˈdɒnɪs/ (NAE)
- Named after: Adonis (Greek mythology)
- Alternative designations: 1936 CA
- Minor planet category: NEO · PHA · Apollo

Orbital characteristics
- Epoch 27 April 2019 (JD 2458600.5)
- Uncertainty parameter 0
- Observation arc: 82.16 yr (30,009 d)
- Aphelion: 3.3069 AU
- Perihelion: 0.4415 AU
- Semi-major axis: 1.8742 AU
- Eccentricity: 0.7644
- Orbital period (sidereal): 2.57 yr (937 d)
- Mean anomaly: 182.53°
- Mean motion: 0° 23^{m} 2.76^{s} / day
- Inclination: 1.3237°
- Longitude of ascending node: 349.57°
- Argument of perihelion: 43.551°
- Earth MOID: 0.0116 AU (4.52 LD)

Physical characteristics
- Mean diameter: 0.523 km (est. at 0.20); 0.6 km (Gehrels est.)
- Absolute magnitude (H): 18.8

2101 Adonis (provisional designation: 1936 CA) is an asteroid on an extremely eccentric orbit, classified as a potentially hazardous asteroid and near-Earth object of the Apollo group. Adonis measures approximately 0.6 km in diameter. Discovered by Eugène Delporte at Uccle in 1936, it became a lost asteroid until 1977. It may also be an extinct comet and a source of meteor showers. It was named after Adonis from Greek mythology.

== Discovery ==
Adonis was discovered on 12 February 1936, by Belgian astronomer Eugène Delporte at the Royal Observatory of Belgium in Uccle. After its initial discovery, which happened during a close approach with Earth, the asteroid was observed for two months, before it became a lost asteroid, as not enough observations could be made to calculate a sufficiently accurate orbit. It took 41 years until it was finally rediscovered by the American astronomer Charles Kowal in 1977, based on mathematical predictions made by Dr. Brian Marsden.

== Orbit and classification ==
The near-Earth object orbits the Sun at a distance of 0.4–3.3 AU once every 2 years and 7 months (937 days; semi-major axis of 1.87 AU). Its orbit has an eccentricity of 0.76 and an inclination of 1° with respect to the ecliptic.

Adonis was one of the first near-Earth objects ever to be discovered. It was also the second known Apollo asteroid after 1862 Apollo, the group's namesake discovered four years earlier in 1932.

=== MOID ===
It is a potentially hazardous asteroid because its Earth minimum orbit intersection distance of 1.74 million km (0.0116 AU), or 4.5 lunar distances, is less than 0.05 AU and its diameter is greater than 150 meters. It also makes close approaches to Venus and Mars and will come within 30 Gm of the Earth six times during the 21st century, the nearest projected distance being 5.34 million km (0.03569 AU), on 7 February 2036.

== Naming ==
This minor planet is named from Greek mythology after the handsome, ever-youthful vegetation god Adonis, with whom the goddess Aphrodite fell in love. Persephone was also taken by Adonis' beauty and refused to give him back to Aphrodite. The dispute between the two goddesses was settled by Zeus: Adonis was to spend one-third of every year with each goddess and the last third wherever he chose. He was killed by a boar sent by Artemis. The minor planets 105 Artemis, 399 Persephone, 1388 Aphrodite and 5731 Zeus were named for these Greek gods. The official naming citation was published by the Minor Planet Center on 1 November 1978 (M.P.C. 4548).

== Physical characteristics ==
Adonis has an absolute magnitude of 18.8, and an estimated mean diameter between 520 and 600 meters. As of 2017, the body's rotation period, composition, spectral type and shape remain unknown.

== Exploration ==
Adonis was considered as a possible target for a 6 million km distant flyby by the Vega 2 spacecraft after its 1986 flyby of Halley's Comet, but Vega 2 did not have enough fuel after the Halley encounter to make the necessary orbital changes for the flyby.
