= 1711 Sandrine =

Asteroid

Discovery
- Discovered by: E. Delporte
- Discovery site: Uccle Obs.
- Discovery date: 29 January 1935

Designations
- Named after: (grand-niece of astronomer); Georges Roland
- Alternative designations: 1935 BB · 1938 SF_{1} 1943 QE · 1949 WF; 1951 CX_{1} · 1952 HG_{1} 1956 AH · 1956 AW; 1956 DC · 1959 TR; 1959 UH · A909 DJ
- Minor planet category: main-belt · (outer); Eos

Orbital characteristics
- Epoch 4 September 2017 (JD 2458000.5)
- Uncertainty parameter 0
- Observation arc: 107.82 yr (39,380 days)
- Aphelion: 3.3596 AU
- Perihelion: 2.6666 AU
- Semi-major axis: 3.0131 AU
- Eccentricity: 0.1150
- Orbital period (sidereal): 5.23 yr (1,910 days)
- Mean anomaly: 5.6639°
- Mean motion: 0° 11^{m} 18.24^{s} / day
- Inclination: 11.095°
- Longitude of ascending node: 134.78°
- Argument of perihelion: 251.25°

Physical characteristics
- Dimensions: 22.929±0.364 km
- Geometric albedo: 0.133±0.011
- Spectral type: Tholen = S B–V = 0.855; U–B = 0.447
- Absolute magnitude (H): 11.01

1711 Sandrine, provisional designation 1935 BB, is a stony Eoan asteroid from the outer region of the asteroid belt, approximately 23 kilometers in diameter.

This asteroid was discovered on 29 January 1935, by Belgian astronomer Eugène Delporte at the Royal Observatory of Belgium in Uccle. It was named after the grand-niece of astronomer Georges Roland.

== Classification and orbit ==
Sandrine is a member of the Eos family (606), the largest asteroid family in the outer main belt consisting of nearly 10,000 asteroids. It orbits the Sun in the outer main-belt at a distance of 2.7–3.4 AU once every 5 years and 3 months (1,910 days). Its orbit has an eccentricity of 0.12 and an inclination of 11° with respect to the ecliptic. The body's observation arc begins with its official discovery observation. Its first observation at Heidelberg in 1909, when it was identified as A909 DJ, has been discarded.

== Physical characteristics ==
In the Tholen classification, Sandrine is characterized as a common S-type asteroid.

=== Diameter and albedo ===
According to the survey carried out by NASA's Wide-field Infrared Survey Explorer with its subsequent NEOWISE mission, Sandrine measures 22.93 kilometers in diameter, and its surface has an albedo of 0.133. It has an absolute magnitude of 11.01.

=== Lightcurves ===
As of 2017, Sandrine's rotation period and shape remain unknown.

== Naming ==
This minor planet was named after Sandrine, a grand-niece of Georges Roland, astronomer at Uccle and co-discoverer of Comet Arend–Roland. Delporte also named 1707 Chantal and 1848 Delvaux after family members of his collaborator. The official naming citation was published by the Minor Planet Center on 8 April 1982 (M.P.C. 6832).
