= Delporte =

Delporte may refer to:

- Eugène Joseph Delporte (1882–1955), Belgian astronomer
- Yvan Delporte (1928–2007), Belgian comics writer and editor
- Ludovic Delporte (born 1980), French footballer
- Julie Delporte (born 1983), Canadian cartoonist and illustrator
- Delporte (crater), a lunar impact crater
