= 1329 Eliane =

Main-belt asteroid

Discovery
- Discovered by: E. Delporte
- Discovery site: Uccle Obs.
- Discovery date: 23 March 1933

Designations
- Named after: Éliane Bourgeois (Paul Bourgeois' daughter)
- Alternative designations: 1933 FL · 1955 MP; 1975 FT
- Minor planet category: main-belt · (middle)

Orbital characteristics
- Epoch 4 September 2017 (JD 2458000.5)
- Uncertainty parameter 0
- Observation arc: 84.02 yr (30,687 days)
- Aphelion: 3.0704 AU
- Perihelion: 2.1626 AU
- Semi-major axis: 2.6165 AU
- Eccentricity: 0.1735
- Orbital period (sidereal): 4.23 yr (1,546 days)
- Mean anomaly: 238.05°
- Mean motion: 0° 13^{m} 58.44^{s} / day
- Inclination: 14.469°
- Longitude of ascending node: 132.07°
- Argument of perihelion: 164.92°

Physical characteristics
- Dimensions: 19.467±0.270 km 19.63 km (calculated); 20.94±0.25 km 22.64±0.47 km
- Synodic rotation period: 8.0±0.1 h (wrong); 72±2 h 106±25 h (Note: Lightcurve plot of 1329 Eliane, Palmer Divide Observatory, B. D. Warner (2001))
- Geometric albedo: 0.1486±0.0119; 0.149±0.012; 0.150±0.019; 0.180±0.005; 0.20 (assumed)
- Spectral type: S (Tholen); S (SMASS) · S B–V = 0.873; U–B = 0.443
- Absolute magnitude (H): 10.90 · 10.71±0.80

1329 Eliane, provisional designation 1933 FL, is a stony asteroid and a potentially slow rotator from the central region of the asteroid belt, approximately 20 kilometers in diameter. It was discovered on 23 March 1933, by Belgian astronomer Eugène Delporte at the Uccle Observatory in Belgium. The asteroid was named after the daughter of astronomer Paul Bourgeois.

== Orbit and classification ==
The S-type asteroid orbits the Sun in the central main-belt at a distance of 2.2–3.1 AU once every 4 years and 3 months (1,546 days). Its orbit has an eccentricity of 0.17 and an inclination of 14° with respect to the ecliptic.

== Rotation period ==
A rotational lightcurve of Eliane revealed a potentially very long rotation period of 106±25 hours with a brightness amplitude of 0.30 in magnitude (U=2-). American astronomer Brian Warner at the Palmer Divide Observatory (716), Colorado, originally took the photometric observations in April 2001. The body's long period was only discovered after the data had been reevaluated in 2010. (Note: Note to Warner's Revised rotation period: "Updated results are given for six asteroids previously reported from the Palmer Divide Observatory. The original images were remeasured to obtain new data sets using the latest version of MPO Canopus photometry software, analysis tools, and revised techniques for linking multiple observing runs covering several days to several weeks. Results that were previously not reported or had significantly different periods and/or amplitudes were found for 1329 Eliane, 1582 Martir, 2023 Asaph, 8041 Masumoto, (26853) 1992 UQ2, and (52387) 1993 OM7. This is the second in a series of papers that examines results obtained during the initial years of the asteroid lightcurve program at PDO." Upon Further Review: II. An Examination of Previous Lightcurve Analysis from the Palmer Divide Observatory) As of 2017, the potentially slow rotator has not been further examined.

== Diameter and albedo ==
According to the surveys carried out by the Japanese Akari satellite and NASA's Wide-field Infrared Survey Explorer with its subsequent NEOWISE mission, the asteroid measures between 19.5 and 22.6 kilometers in diameter and its surface has an albedo in the range of 0.15 to 0.18. The Collaborative Asteroid Lightcurve Link assumes a standard albedo for stony asteroids of 0.20, and calculates a diameter of 19.6 kilometers using an absolute magnitude of 10.90.

== Naming ==
This minor planet was named after Éliane Bourgeois, daughter of astronomer Paul Bourgeois, who was a professor at the discovering Royal Observatory in Uccle, Belgium, and after whom the asteroid 1543 Bourgeois is named. The official naming citation was mentioned in The Names of the Minor Planets by Paul Herget in 1955 (H 121). Bourgeois himself is credited with the discovery of 1547 Nele.
