= 1052 Belgica =

Main-belt asteroid

Discovery
- Discovered by: E. Delporte
- Discovery site: Uccle Obs.
- Discovery date: 15 November 1925

Designations
- Pronunciation: /ˈbɛldʒɪkə/
- Named after: Belgium (country)
- Alternative designations: 1925 VD · 1965 UO_{1} A908 TB
- Minor planet category: main-belt · Flora

Orbital characteristics
- Epoch 16 February 2017 (JD 2457800.5)
- Uncertainty parameter 0
- Observation arc: 108.27 yr (39,545 days)
- Aphelion: 2.5565 AU
- Perihelion: 1.9166 AU
- Semi-major axis: 2.2366 AU
- Eccentricity: 0.1431
- Orbital period (sidereal): 3.34 yr (1,222 days)
- Mean anomaly: 120.60°
- Mean motion: 0° 17^{m} 40.92^{s} / day
- Inclination: 4.6949°
- Longitude of ascending node: 99.631°
- Argument of perihelion: 297.54°
- Known satellites: 1

Physical characteristics
- Dimensions: 9.785±0.123 km 10.406±0.077 km 10.94 km (derived); 11±2 km
- Synodic rotation period: 2.70933±0.0003 h 2.7097±0.0001 h 2.7097±0.0001 h
- Geometric albedo: 0.20 (assumed); 0.2734±0.0736; 0.301±0.028
- Spectral type: B–V = 0.900; U–B = 0.540; S (Tholen) · S (SMASS); S
- Absolute magnitude (H): 11.97 · 12.09±0.25 · 12.17±0.05

1052 Belgica, provisional designation 1925 VD, is a binary Florian asteroid from the inner regions of the asteroid belt, approximately 10 kilometers in diameter. It was discovered on 15 November 1925, by Belgian astronomer Eugène Delporte at Uccle Observatory in Belgium. It was the first minor planet discovered at Uccle Observatory, after which the minor planet 1276 Ucclia was named.

1052 is named after the Western European state of Belgium.

== Classification and orbit ==
Belgica is a member of the Flora family, one of the largest groups of stony asteroids in the main-belt. It orbits the Sun at a distance of 1.9–2.6 AU once every 3 years and 4 months (1,222 days). Its orbit has an eccentricity of 0.14 and an inclination of 5° with respect to the ecliptic. Belgica was first identified as A908 TB at Heidelberg in 1908. The body's observation arc begins with its first used observation taken at Uccle/Bergedorf in 1933, or 8 years after its official discovery at Uccle.

== Physical characteristics ==
In both the Tholen and SMASS taxonomy, Belgica is classified as a common stony S-type asteroid.

=== Rotation period ===
Between December 2012, and January 2013, photometric observations of Belgica were taken at several observatories in Italy, the Czech Republic, Spain and the United States by astronomers Luis Martinez, Lorenzo Franco, Andrea Ferrero, Petr Pravec, and Stefano Padovan. They gave three concurring lightcurves with a rotation period of 2.709 hours and a brightness variation of 0.08 to 0.10 magnitude, indicating a nearly spheroidal shape for the asteroid's body (U=2/3/n.a.).

=== Satellite ===
The photometric observations also revealed, that Belgica is a binary system with an asteroid moon, approximately 36% the diameter of its primary, orbiting it every 47.26±0.02 hours. Johnston's archive derives a diameter of 3.53 kilometers and estimates a semi-major axis of 34 kilometer for the moon.

=== Diameter and albedo ===
According to the survey carried out by NASA's Wide-field Infrared Survey Explorer with its subsequent NEOWISE mission, Belgica measures 9.78 and 10.406 kilometers in diameter and its surface has an albedo of 0.301 and 0.273, respectively, while the Collaborative Asteroid Lightcurve Link assumes a standard albedo for stony asteroids of 0.20 and derives a diameter of 10.94 kilometers with an absolute magnitude of 12.17. This agrees with the estimated diameter of 11±2 kilometers by Franco et al.

== Naming ==
This minor planet was named in honor of the state of Belgium. The name "Belgica" was suggested during the height of World War I by American astronomer Joel Hastings Metcalf, but the Director of the German Astronomisches Rechen-Institut in Berlin, Fritz Cohn, rejected the proposal based on political considerations, as Belgium was occupied by German troops at the time.

In his Dictionary of Minor Planets Names, astronomer Lutz Schmadel described this piece of history involving minor planet names in detail. Naming citation was first mentioned in The Names of the Minor Planets by Paul Herget in 1955 (H 100).
