= 1122 Neith =

Main-belt asteroid

Discovery
- Discovered by: E. Delporte
- Discovery site: Uccle Obs.
- Discovery date: 17 September 1928

Designations
- Pronunciation: /ˈniːɪθ/
- Named after: Neith (Egyptian mythology)
- Alternative designations: 1928 SB · 1941 YH; 1953 OA · A924 VA
- Minor planet category: main-belt · (middle) background

Orbital characteristics
- Epoch 4 September 2017 (JD 2458000.5)
- Uncertainty parameter 0
- Observation arc: 93.01 yr (33,971 days)
- Aphelion: 3.2763 AU
- Perihelion: 1.9347 AU
- Semi-major axis: 2.6055 AU
- Eccentricity: 0.2575
- Orbital period (sidereal): 4.21 yr (1,536 days)
- Mean anomaly: 30.680°
- Mean motion: 0° 14^{m} 3.48^{s} / day
- Inclination: 4.7381°
- Longitude of ascending node: 63.385°
- Argument of perihelion: 328.96°

Physical characteristics
- Dimensions: 11.566±0.261 km 11.73 km (derived); 12.01±0.5 km 13.453±1.632 km 13.81±0.73 km 13.84±1.46 km (MSX)
- Synodic rotation period: 12.599±0.006 h
- Geometric albedo: 0.206±0.048; 0.2756 (derived); 0.2836±0.0435; 0.284±0.043; 0.34; 0.4450±0.044
- Spectral type: A · S (assumed)
- Absolute magnitude (H): 11.10 · 11.67 · 11.7 · 11.71±0.49 · 11.9

1122 Neith /ˈniːɪθ/, provisional designation 1928 SB, is a background asteroid from the central region of the asteroid belt, approximately 12 kilometers in diameter. It was discovered by Belgian astronomer Eugène Delporte at the Royal Observatory of Belgium in Uccle on 17 September 1928. The asteroid was named after the goddess Neith from Egyptian mythology.

== Orbit and classification ==
Neith is a non-family asteroid from the main belt's background population. It orbits the Sun in the central asteroid belt at a distance of 1.9–3.3 AU once every 4 years and 3 months (1,536 days; semi-major axis of 2.61 AU). Its orbit has an eccentricity of 0.26 and an inclination of 5° with respect to the ecliptic. The body's observation arc begins with its observation as A924 VA at Heidelberg Observatory in November 1924, almost four years prior to its official discovery observation at Uccle.

== Physical characteristics ==
Neith has been characterized as an uncommon A-type asteroid during a spectroscopic survey after it had previously been classified as X-type in the Tholen taxonomy. The asteroid's surface shows a strong 0.96 μm absorption band (depth of 24%) and a steep slope in the near-infrared region, typical of olivine-rich bodies. The survey was conducted at the NTT, TNG and IRTF telescopes during 2004–2007.

=== Rotation period ===
In September 2008, a rotational lightcurve of Neith was obtained from photometric observations by Julian Oey at the Leura and Kingsgrove Observatory in Australia. Lightcurve analysis gave a synodic rotation period of 12.5990 hours with a brightness variation of 0.08 magnitude (U=2).

=== Diameter and albedo ===
According to the surveys carried out by the Infrared Astronomical Satellite IRAS (SIMPS and MSX), the Spitzer Space Telescope (MIPS photometer and MIPSGAL survey) and the NEOWISE mission of the Wide-field Infrared Survey Explorer, Neith measures between 11.566 and 13.84 kilometers in diameter and its surface has an albedo between 0.206 and 0.4450.

The Collaborative Asteroid Lightcurve Link derives an albedo of 0.2756 and a diameter of 11.73 kilometers based on an absolute magnitude of 11.67.

== Naming ==
This minor planet was named from Egyptian mythology after the goddess of Libyan origin, Neith, goddess of the hunt and of war, believed to be the mother of the Sun. The official naming citation was mentioned in The Names of the Minor Planets by Paul Herget in 1955 (H 105).
