= 1433 Geramtina =

Main-belt asteroid

Discovery
- Discovered by: E. Delporte
- Discovery site: Uccle Obs.
- Discovery date: 30 October 1937

Designations
- Named after: Sister of Bror Asplind (Swedish astronomer)
- Alternative designations: 1937 UC · 1951 XH; 1967 EH · 1974 TX_{1}
- Minor planet category: main-belt · (outer); Gefion · background

Orbital characteristics
- Epoch 4 September 2017 (JD 2458000.5)
- Uncertainty parameter 0
- Observation arc: 79.92 yr (29,191 days)
- Aphelion: 3.2757 AU
- Perihelion: 2.3162 AU
- Semi-major axis: 2.7960 AU
- Eccentricity: 0.1716
- Orbital period (sidereal): 4.68 yr (1,708 days)
- Mean anomaly: 19.222°
- Mean motion: 0° 12^{m} 38.88^{s} / day
- Inclination: 8.2369°
- Longitude of ascending node: 321.57°
- Argument of perihelion: 93.975°

Physical characteristics
- Dimensions: 12.687±0.209 km 14.22 km (calculated); 14.574±0.247 km
- Synodic rotation period: 14 h
- Geometric albedo: 0.1910±0.0170; 0.20 (assumed); 0.251±0.027
- Spectral type: SMASS = S · S
- Absolute magnitude (H): 11.43±0.23 · 11.60

1433 Geramtina, provisional designation 1937 UC, is a stony Gefion asteroid from the central regions of the asteroid belt, approximately 14 kilometers in diameter. It was discovered by Belgian astronomer Eugène Delporte at the Royal Observatory of Belgium in Uccle on 30 October 1937.

The asteroid was named "Geramtina" after the sister of Swedish astronomer Bror Asplind. Geramtina has an ordinary chondritic composition and has been considered a candidate for being the parent body of the H chondrites. However, results are inconclusive, and recent HCM analysis suggest that Geramtina is a Gefionian interloper rather than a core member of the family. The asteroid has a tentative rotation period of 14 hours.

== Orbit and classification ==
Geramtina is a core member of the Gefion family (516), which is also known as Minerva family. However, it is a non-family asteroid of the main belt's background population according to Nesvorny's application of the body's proper orbital elements to the hierarchical clustering method (synthetic), suggesting that Geramtina is an interloper rather than a core member.

It orbits the Sun in the central main-belt at a distance of 2.3–3.3 AU once every 4 years and 8 months (1,708 days). Its orbit has an eccentricity of 0.17 and an inclination of 8° with respect to the ecliptic. The body's observation arc begins with its official discovery observation at Uccle in 1937.

== Physical characteristics ==
=== Spectral type ===
In the SMASS classification, Geramtina is a common, stony S-type asteroid. The photometric survey by Pan-STARRS has also characterized the asteroid as an S-type.

=== Mineralogy ===
The spectra of Geramtina together with 4182 Mount Locke have been studies in a mineralogical assessment to test whether these considered core members of the Gefion family might be the source of the L chondrites, a common group of meteorites, due to their dynamical and compositional characteristics. Spectra obtained with the 3-meter NASA IRTF telescope, however, were inconclusive and suggest that Geramtina might as well be a H chondrite rather than an L chondrite, but allows for the determination of a general S(IV) ordinary chondritic composition. The researchers also acknowledged that the Gefion family space has a high abundance of interlopers which needs to be ruled out first.

=== Rotation period ===
In October 2007, a rotational lightcurve of Geramtina was obtained from photometric observations at the National Undergraduate Research Observatory, NURO, in Flagstaff, Arizona. Lightcurve analysis gave a tentative rotation period of 14 hours (monomodal solution) with a brightness amplitude of 0.07 magnitude (U=2-). Alternatively, it has a bimodal period solution of 28 hours, which is considered more likely by the observers, but ignored by the Asteroid Lightcurve Data Base.

=== Diameter and albedo ===
According to the survey carried out by the NEOWISE mission of NASA's Wide-field Infrared Survey Explorer, Geramtina measures 12.687 and 14.574 kilometers in diameter and its surface has an albedo of 0.251 and 0.1910, respectively.

The Collaborative Asteroid Lightcurve Link assumes a standard albedo of stony asteroids 0.20 and calculates a diameter of 14.22 kilometers based on an absolute magnitude of 11.6.

== Naming ==
This minor planet was named by Swedish astronomer Bror Ansgar Asplind (1890–1954) after his sister. The name "Geramtina" is a constructed name. Bror Asplind computed the orbits of several discoveries made at Uccle Observatory in preparation of the 6th IAU General Assembly in Stockholm in 1938. The official naming citation was mentioned in The Names of the Minor Planets by Paul Herget in 1955 (H 129).
