= 1274 Delportia =

Minor planet

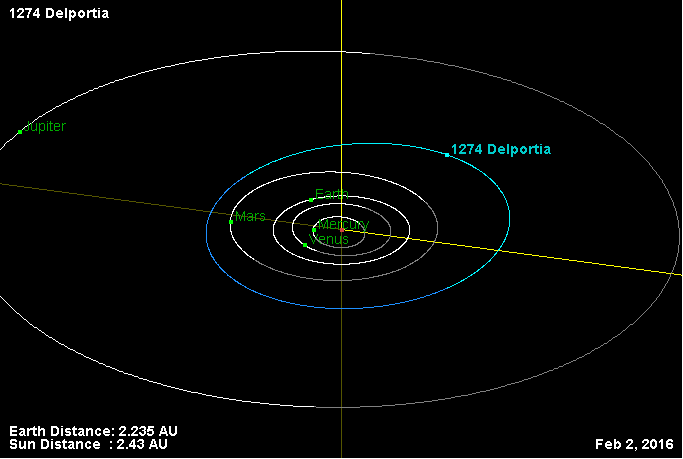
- Orbital diagram

Discovery
- Discovered by: E. Delporte
- Discovery site: Uccle Obs.
- Discovery date: 28 November 1932

Designations
- Named after: Eugène Delporte (Belgian astronomer)
- Alternative designations: 1932 WC · 1926 AA; 1928 RX · 1934 JD; A918 RA
- Minor planet category: main-belt · Flora

Orbital characteristics
- Epoch 4 September 2017 (JD 2458000.5)
- Uncertainty parameter 0
- Observation arc: 98.84 yr (36,101 days)
- Aphelion: 2.4813 AU
- Perihelion: 1.9772 AU
- Semi-major axis: 2.2292 AU
- Eccentricity: 0.1131
- Orbital period (sidereal): 3.33 yr (1,216 days)
- Mean anomaly: 33.180°
- Mean motion: 0° 17^{m} 45.96^{s} / day
- Inclination: 4.3970°
- Longitude of ascending node: 327.09°
- Argument of perihelion: 244.65°

Physical characteristics
- Dimensions: 9.611±0.121 km 10.384±0.048 km 12.85 km (calculated); 12.95±0.22 km
- Synodic rotation period: 5.5±0.07 h 5.615±0.001 h (Note: Sheridan (2011) web: rotation period 5.615±0.001 hours with a brightness amplitude of 0.05 magnitude and a Quality Code of 3. Summary figures for (1274) Delportia at Collaborative Asteroid Lightcurve Link (CALL)); 5.6204±0.0040 h
- Geometric albedo: 0.20 (assumed); 0.200±0.008; 0.3104±0.0340; 0.461±0.057
- Spectral type: Tholen = S · S B–V = 0.895; U–B = 0.525
- Absolute magnitude (H): 11.57±0.48 · 11.82 · 11.940±0.001 (R)

1274 Delportia, provisional designation 1932 WC, is a stony Florian asteroid from the inner regions of the asteroid belt, approximately 10 kilometers in diameter. It was discovered on 28 November 1932, by Belgian astronomer Eugène Delporte at Uccle Observatory in Belgium. It was named after the discoverer himself.

== Orbit and classification ==
Delportia is a stony S-type asteroid on the Tholen taxonomic scheme. As a member of the Flora family, one of the largest families of the main belt, it orbits the Sun in the inner main-belt at a distance of 2.0–2.5 AU once every 3 years and 4 months (1,216 days). Its orbit has an eccentricity of 0.11 and an inclination of 4° with respect to the ecliptic. It was first identified as A918 RA at Heidelberg Observatory in 1918. The body's observation arc begins 6 years prior to its official discovery observation at Uccle, when it was identified as 1926 AA at Heidelberg in 1926.

== Physical characteristics ==
=== Rotation period ===
A rotational light curve of Delportia was obtained by American astronomer Edwin E. Sheridan in March 2007. Light curve analysis gave a well-defined rotation period of 5.615 hours with a brightness variation of 0.05 magnitude (U=3), superseding a period of 5.5 hours with an amplitude of 0.09 magnitude obtained by French amateur astronomer René Roy in December 2005 (U=2). In February 2010, photometric observations at the Palomar Transient Factory gave a period of 5.6204 hours and an amplitude of 0.26 magnitude (U=2).

=== Diameter and albedo ===
According to the surveys carried out by NASA's Wide-field Infrared Survey Explorer with its subsequent NEOWISE mission, and the Japanese Akari satellite, Delportia measures 9.61 and 12.95 kilometers in diameter, and its surface has an albedo of 0.46 and 0.20, respectively. The Collaborative Asteroid Lightcurve Link assumes a standard albedo for stony asteroids of 0.20 and calculates a diameter of 12.85 kilometers using an absolute magnitude of 11.82.

== Naming ==
Based on a suggestion by Gustav Stracke, this minor planet was named for its discoverer, Eugène Delporte (1882–1955), prolific discoverer of minor planets, astronomer and director at the discovering Uccle Observatory during 1936–1947. The lunar crater Delporte is also named in his honor. The official naming citation was first mentioned in The Names of the Minor Planets by Paul Herget in 1955 (H 117).
