= 1168 Brandia =

Asteroid

Discovery
- Discovered by: E. Delporte
- Discovery site: Uccle Obs.
- Discovery date: 25 August 1930

Designations
- Named after: Eugène Brand (Belgian mathematician)
- Alternative designations: 1930 QA
- Minor planet category: main-belt · (middle); Eunomia

Orbital characteristics
- Epoch 4 September 2017 (JD 2458000.5)
- Uncertainty parameter 0
- Observation arc: 82.70 yr (30,208 days)
- Aphelion: 3.1088 AU
- Perihelion: 1.9931 AU
- Semi-major axis: 2.5510 AU
- Eccentricity: 0.2187
- Orbital period (sidereal): 4.07 yr (1,488 days)
- Mean anomaly: 120.52°
- Mean motion: 0° 14^{m} 30.84^{s} / day
- Inclination: 12.735°
- Longitude of ascending node: 218.65°
- Argument of perihelion: 122.91°

Physical characteristics
- Dimensions: 10.110±0.057 km 10.58 km (derived); 10.61±0.7 km
- Synodic rotation period: 11.444 h 11.444 h
- Geometric albedo: 0.1375 (derived); 0.150±0.038; 0.1505±0.0383; 0.1526±0.021
- Spectral type: S B–V = 0.860; U–B = 0.470
- Absolute magnitude (H): 12.30±0.23 · 12.53 · 12.65

1168 Brandia, provisional designation 1930 QA, is a stony Eunomian asteroid from the central regions of the asteroid belt, approximately 10 kilometers in diameter. Discovered by astronomer Eugène Delporte at Uccle Observatory in 1930, the asteroid was later named after mathematician Eugène Brand.

== Discovery ==
Brandia was discovered on 25 August 1930, by astronomer Eugène Delporte at the Royal Observatory of Belgium in Uccle. Six nights later, the asteroid was independently discovered by Soviet astronomer Grigory Neujmin at Simeiz Observatory on 31 August 1930. The Minor Planet Center, however, only recognizes the first discoverer. The body's observation arc begins at Uccle, two nights after its official discovery observation.

== Orbit and classification ==
This asteroid is a member of the Eunomia family (502), a prominent family of stony asteroids and the largest one in the intermediate main belt with more than 5,000 members.

Brandia orbits the Sun in the central main-belt at a distance of 2.0–3.1 AU once every 4 years and 1 month (1,488 days). Its orbit has an eccentricity of 0.22 and an inclination of 13° with respect to the ecliptic.

== Physical characteristics ==
Brandia is an assumed S-type asteroid, which corresponds to the overall spectral type of the Eunomia family.

=== Rotation period ===
In September 1989, a rotational lightcurve of Brandia was obtained from photometric observations by American astronomer Richard Binzel at CTIO and McDonald Observatory. Lightcurve analysis gave a well-defined rotation period of hours with a relatively high brightness variation of 0.62 magnitude (U=3).

An identical period of 11.444 hours with an amplitude of 0.50 magnitude was measured with a Celestron 14-inch telescope by Frederick Pilcher and published in 1985 (U=2).

=== Diameter and albedo ===
According to the surveys carried out by the Infrared Astronomical Satellite IRAS and the NEOWISE mission of NASA's Wide-field Infrared Survey Explorer, Brandia measures 10.110 and 10.61 kilometers in diameter, and its surface has an albedo of 0.150 and 0.1526, respectively.

The Collaborative Asteroid Lightcurve Link derives an albedo of 0.1375 and a diameter of 10.58 kilometers based on an absolute magnitude of 12.65.

== Naming ==
This minor planet was named after Belgian mathematician Eugène Brand, professor at the University of Brussels in Belgium. The official naming citation was mentioned in The Names of the Minor Planets by Paul Herget in 1955 (H 109).
