= Legia (disambiguation) =

Legia is the Polish football club from Warsaw. Other meanings include:

- 1261 Legia, a dark Themistian asteroid
- Legia Poznań, a defunct Polish football club from Poznań
- Legia Warsaw (sports club), a Polish multi-sports club from Warsaw
