= 1176 Lucidor =

Main-belt asteroid

Discovery
- Discovered by: E. Delporte
- Discovery site: Uccle Obs.
- Discovery date: 15 November 1930

Designations
- Named after: Lucidor (discoverer's friend and amateur astronomer)
- Alternative designations: 1930 VE · 1927 BF; 1971 BD_{2}
- Minor planet category: main-belt · (middle)

Orbital characteristics
- Epoch 4 September 2017 (JD 2458000.5)
- Uncertainty parameter 0
- Observation arc: 86.61 yr (31,633 days)
- Aphelion: 3.0768 AU
- Perihelion: 2.3054 AU
- Semi-major axis: 2.6911 AU
- Eccentricity: 0.1433
- Orbital period (sidereal): 4.41 yr (1,613 days)
- Mean anomaly: 224.91°
- Mean motion: 0° 13^{m} 23.88^{s} / day
- Inclination: 6.6465°
- Longitude of ascending node: 272.24°
- Argument of perihelion: 156.29°

Physical characteristics
- Dimensions: 17.489±0.528 km 17.49±0.53 km 18.62±0.20 km 30.59 km (derived); 30.65±0.8 km 31.32±12.82 km 31.48±0.53 km
- Synodic rotation period: 4.075±0.001 h 4.0791±0.0006 h (Note: Lightcurve plot of 1176 Lucidor, Palmer Divide Observatory, Brian D. Warner (2005), with a rotation period 4.0791±0.0006 hours with a brightness amplitude of 0.06±0.02 mag.)
- Geometric albedo: 0.04±0.02; 0.043±0.021; 0.0544 (derived); 0.079±0.003; 0.0821±0.005; 0.14±0.03; 0.159±0.024
- Spectral type: SMASS = C · C
- Absolute magnitude (H): 10.90 · 11.11±0.42 · 11.35 · 11.35±0.04 · 11.40

1176 Lucidor, provisional designation 1930 VE, is a carbonaceous background asteroid from the central region of the asteroid belt, approximately 30 kilometers in diameter. It was discovered by Eugène Delporte in 1930, who named it after a friend.

== Discovery ==
Lucidor was discovered on 15 November 1930, by Belgian astronomer Eugène Delporte at the Royal Observatory of Belgium in Uccle. On the same day, it was independently discovered by Max Wolf at the Heidelberg Observatory in Germany, and 15 days later by Grigory Neujmin at Simeiz Observatory in Crimea. The body's observation arc begins with its identification as 1927 BF at the Tokyo Astronomical Observatory (389) in January 1927, nearly 4 years prior to its official discovery observation at Uccle.

== Orbit and classification ==
Lucidor has not been grouped to any known asteroid family. It orbits the Sun in the central main belt at a distance of 2.3–3.1 AU once every 4 years and 5 months (1,613 days). Its orbit has an eccentricity of 0.14 and an inclination of 7° with respect to the ecliptic.

== Physical characteristics ==
In the SMASS classification, Lucidor is a carbonaceous C-type asteroid.

=== Rotation period ===
In November 2005, two rotational lightcurves of Lucidor were independently obtained from photometric observations by Brian Warner at his Palmer Divide Observatory (716) in Colorado as well as by René Roy at Blauvac, France (627), and Federico Manzini and Roberto Crippa at Sozzago in Italy (A12). Lightcurve analysis gave a well-defined rotation period of 4.075 and 4.0791 hours with a low brightness amplitude of 0.05 and 0.06 magnitude, respectively (U=3/3). A low brightness variation typically indicates that the body has a spheroidal rather than an irregular shape.

=== Diameter and albedo ===
According to the surveys carried out by the Infrared Astronomical Satellite IRAS, the Japanese Akari satellite and the NEOWISE mission of NASA's Wide-field Infrared Survey Explorer, Lucidor measures between 17.489 and 31.48 kilometers in diameter and its surface has an albedo between 0.04 and 0.159.

The Collaborative Asteroid Lightcurve Link derives an albedo of 0.0544 and a diameter of 30.59 kilometers based on an absolute magnitude of 11.35.

== Naming ==
This minor planet was named after an amateur astronomer and friend of the discoverer. "Lucidor" is a female name. Her full name has not been published. The official naming citation was mentioned in The Names of the Minor Planets by Paul Herget in 1955 (H 109).
