= 1128 Astrid =

Asteroid

Discovery
- Discovered by: E. Delporte
- Discovery site: Uccle Obs.
- Discovery date: 10 March 1929

Designations
- Named after: Astrid of Sweden (Queen consort of the Belgians)
- Alternative designations: 1929 EB · 1949 QF_{2} 1954 UL_{3} · 1964 VW; 1972 LM_{1} · A917 SQ; A920 JA
- Minor planet category: main-belt · (middle) · Astrid
- Adjectives: Astridian

Orbital characteristics
- Epoch 4 September 2017 (JD 2458000.5)
- Uncertainty parameter 0
- Observation arc: 97.07 yr (35,455 days)
- Aphelion: 2.9171 AU
- Perihelion: 2.6577 AU
- Semi-major axis: 2.7874 AU
- Eccentricity: 0.0465
- Orbital period (sidereal): 4.65 yr (1,700 days)
- Mean anomaly: 248.28°
- Mean motion: 0° 12^{m} 42.48^{s} / day
- Inclination: 1.0145°
- Longitude of ascending node: 59.420°
- Argument of perihelion: 234.37°

Physical characteristics
- Dimensions: 33.28±9.67 km 34.60 km (derived); 34.69±2.1 km 41.851±0.278 km 41.97±0.72 km 44.784±0.912 km 45.03±10.37 km 52.48±0.40 km
- Synodic rotation period: 10.2±0.1 h 10.228±0.002 h 10.229±0.0031 h
- Geometric albedo: 0.031±0.004; 0.04±0.02; 0.0462±0.0181; 0.053±0.002; 0.06±0.03; 0.0644 (derived); 0.0770±0.010
- Spectral type: SMASS = C · C
- Absolute magnitude (H): 10.588±0.002 (R) · 10.70 · 10.80 · 10.90 · 10.93 · 11.02±0.35

1128 Astrid, provisional designation 1929 EB, is a carbonaceous Astridian asteroid from the central region of the asteroid belt. It is the parent body of the Astrid family and measures approximately 40 kilometers in diameter.

The asteroid was discovered by Belgian astronomer Eugène Delporte at the Royal Observatory of Belgium in Uccle on 10 March 1929, and later named for Astrid of Sweden, Queen consort of the Belgians.

== Orbit and classification ==
Astrid is the parent body of the Astrid family (515), a smaller asteroid family of nearly 500 carbonaceous members. It is located in the outermost central main-belt, near a prominent Kirkwood gap, that marks the 5:2 orbital resonance with Jupiter, and divides the asteroid belt into a central and outer part.

Astrid orbits the Sun at a distance of 2.7–2.9 AU once every 4 years and 8 months (1,700 days). Its orbit has an eccentricity of 0.05 and an inclination of 1° with respect to the ecliptic.

The asteroid was first identified as A917 SQ at the Simeiz Observatory in September 1917. The body's observation arc begins with its identification as A920 JA at Heidelberg Observatory in May 1920, nearly 9 years prior to its official discovery observation at Uccle.

== Physical characteristics ==
In the SMASS classification, Astrid is a carbonaceous C-type asteroid, which corresponds to the overall spectral type of the Astrid family.

=== Rotation period ===
In September 2005, a rotational lightcurve of Astrid was obtained from photometric observations by French amateur astronomer René Roy. Lightcurve analysis gave a rotation period of 10.228 hours with a brightness variation of 0.29 magnitude (U=2+). In October 2010, additional lightcurves were obtained at the Palomar Transient Factory in California, as well as by astronomers Eric Barbotin and Raoul Behrend, which gave a concurring period of 10.2 and 10.229 hours with an amplitude of 0.10 and 0.13 magnitude, respectively (U=1/2).

=== Diameter and albedo ===
According to the surveys carried out by the Infrared Astronomical Satellite IRAS, the Japanese Akari satellite and the NEOWISE mission of NASA's Wide-field Infrared Survey Explorer, Astrid measures between 33.28 and 52.48 kilometers in diameter and its surface has an albedo between 0.031 and 0.077.

The Collaborative Asteroid Lightcurve Link derives an albedo of 0.0644 and a diameter of 34.60 kilometers based on an absolute magnitude of 10.9.

1128 Astrid has been observed to occult 2 stars, both events on 24 Jun 2023 UT.

== Naming ==
This minor planet was named in memory of Astrid of Sweden (1905–1935), Queen consort of the Belgians, who died at the age of 29 in a car accident while on vacation in Switzerland. The official naming citation was mentioned in The Names of the Minor Planets by Paul Herget in 1955 (H 106).
