= 1222 Tina =

Main-belt asteroid

Discovery
- Discovered by: E. Delporte
- Discovery site: Uccle Obs.
- Discovery date: 11 June 1932

Designations
- Named after: Tina (friend of the discoverer)
- Alternative designations: 1932 LA · 1955 HP
- Minor planet category: main-belt · (middle); Tina

Orbital characteristics
- Epoch 16 February 2017 (JD 2457800.5)
- Uncertainty parameter 0
- Observation arc: 84.40 yr (30,827 days)
- Aphelion: 3.4912 AU
- Perihelion: 2.0983 AU
- Semi-major axis: 2.7947 AU
- Eccentricity: 0.2492
- Orbital period (sidereal): 4.67 yr (1,707 days)
- Mean anomaly: 31.083°
- Mean motion: 0° 12^{m} 39.6^{s} / day
- Inclination: 19.587°
- Longitude of ascending node: 245.80°
- Argument of perihelion: 59.912°

Physical characteristics
- Dimensions: 20.12 km (derived); 20.84±1.8 km 25.781±0.138 km 26.28±0.33 km 28.667±0.122 km
- Synodic rotation period: 12 h (dated); 13.395±0.003 h 17.164±0.003 h
- Geometric albedo: 0.1445 (derived); 0.1645±0.0191; 0.199±0.006; 0.202±0.045; 0.3086±0.059
- Spectral type: SMASS = X · M · X
- Absolute magnitude (H): 10.3 · 11.2

1222 Tina, provisional designation 1932 LA, is a metallic asteroid and parent body of the Tina family located in the intermediate asteroid belt, approximately 25 kilometers in diameter. It was discovered on 11 June 1932, by Belgian astronomer Eugène Delporte at Uccle Observatory in Belgium. It was named after a friend of the discoverer.

== Classification and orbit ==
Tina is the namesake of the Tina family a group of 17–89 asteroids that form a small, well-defined asteroid family, which share similar spectral properties and orbital elements; hence they may have arisen from the same collisional event of two larger parent bodies. All members have a relatively high orbital inclination. The Tina family is unique because of its resonant nature: all its members are in anti-aligned librating states of the ν6 secular resonance, i.e., the longitudes of pericenter of the asteroids follow the longitudes of pericenter of Saturn by 180 degrees. This orbital configuration protects the asteroids from achieving high eccentricities and experiencing close encounters with terrestrial planets, forming a stable in a region strongly perturbed by the ν6 secular resonance. The family is estimated to be relatively young, about 170+20
−30 million years old, and will most likely disperse to unstable regions in timescales of 200 million years.

It orbits the Sun at a distance of 2.1–3.5 AU once every 4 years and 8 months (1,707 days). Its orbit has an eccentricity of 0.25 and an inclination of 20° with respect to the ecliptic. The body's observation arc begins with its official discovery observation as no precoveries were taken, and no prior identifications were made.

== Physical characteristics ==
=== Diameter and albedo ===
According to the surveys carried out by the Infrared Astronomical Satellite IRAS, the Japanese Akari satellite, and NASA's Wide-field Infrared Survey Explorer with its subsequent NEOWISE mission, Tina measures between 20.84 and 26.28 kilometers in diameter and its surface has an albedo between 0.199 and 0.308 (without preliminary results). The Collaborative Asteroid Lightcurve Link derives an albedo of 0.1445 and a diameter of 20.12 kilometers using an absolute magnitude of 11.2.

=== Spectral type ===
In the SMASS taxonomy, Tina is an X-type asteroid, while it is classified as a metal-rich M-type asteroid by the WISE-survey.

=== Rotation period ===
Tina has a well-defined rotation period of 13.395 hours with a brightness variation of 0.18 magnitude (U=3), derived from photometric observations taken by American astronomer Brian Warner at his Palmer Divide Observatory, Colorado, in September 2007 (also see § External links). Other lightcurves were obtained by French amateur astronomers Pierre Antonini and Jean-Gabriel Bosch, which gave a period of 17.164 hours and an amplitude of 0.30 magnitude (U=2/2).

== Naming ==
This minor planet was named after "Tina", an amateur astronomer and friend of the discoverer. In 1955, naming citation was published by Paul Herget in The Names of the Minor Planets (H 114).
