= 3567 Alvema =

Main-belt asteroid

Discovery
- Discovered by: E. Delporte
- Discovery site: Uccle Obs.
- Discovery date: 15 November 1930

Designations
- Named after: (great-granddaughters of the discoverer)
- Alternative designations: 1930 VD · 1930 XO; 1930 XQ · 1967 SB; 1972 VN_{1} · 1972 XC_{2} 1972 YD_{1} · 1978 EP_{4}
- Minor planet category: main-belt · (middle)

Orbital characteristics
- Epoch 4 September 2017 (JD 2458000.5)
- Uncertainty parameter 0
- Observation arc: 86.53 yr (31,606 days)
- Aphelion: 3.6551 AU
- Perihelion: 1.9157 AU
- Semi-major axis: 2.7854 AU
- Eccentricity: 0.3122
- Orbital period (sidereal): 4.65 yr (1,698 days)
- Mean anomaly: 238.05°
- Mean motion: 0° 12^{m} 43.2^{s} / day
- Inclination: 6.8229°
- Longitude of ascending node: 270.99°
- Argument of perihelion: 138.24°

Physical characteristics
- Dimensions: 13.832±0.084 km 13.98 km (calculated); 14.531±0.076 km
- Synodic rotation period: 8.1216±0.0001 h 8.13±0.01 h
- Geometric albedo: 0.031±0.002; 0.0467±0.0015; 0.057 (assumed)
- Spectral type: SMASS = Xc; P · X
- Absolute magnitude (H): 12.5 · 13.0 · 13.36±0.04

3567 Alvema, provisional designation 1930 VD, is a dark asteroid from the middle region of the asteroid belt, approximately 14 kilometers in diameter. It was discovered by Belgian astronomer Eugène Delporte at the Royal Observatory of Belgium in Uccle, on 15 November 1930. It was named after the discoverer's three great-granddaughters Aline, Vérionique and Martine.

== Orbit and classification ==
Alvema orbits the Sun in the central main-belt at a distance of 1.9–3.7 AU once every 4 years and 8 months (1,698 days). Its orbit has an eccentricity of 0.31 and an inclination of 7° with respect to the ecliptic. No precoveries were taken prior to its discovery.

== Physical characteristics ==
The X-type asteroid is classified as a Xc-subtype on the SMASS taxonomic scheme, while the NEOWISE mission of NASA's space-based Wide-field Infrared Survey Explorer groups it into the P-type spectral class.

=== Rotation period ===
In December 2014, a rotational lightcurve of Alvema was obtained from photometric observations by French amateur astronomer Laurent Bernasconi. It gave a rotation period of 8.13±0.01 with a brightness variation of 0.33 magnitude (U=2+). The asteroid's first lightcurve was reported by astronomer Darryl Sergison at the Gothers Observatory (J03) in the United Kingdom, from observations made in November 2009, showing a period of 8.1216±0.0001 hours with an amplitude of 0.17 magnitude (U=2).

=== Diameter and albedo ===
According to the survey carried out by NEOWISE, Alvema measures 13.8 and 14.5 kilometers in diameter and its surface has a low albedo of 0.031 and 0.047, respectively, while the Collaborative Asteroid Lightcurve Link assumes a standard albedo for carbonaceous asteroids of 0.057 and calculates a diameter of 14.0 kilometers.

== Naming ==
This minor planet was named by the discoverer after Aline, Vérionique and Martine (Al-Ve-Ma), his three great-granddaughters, Aline De Middlelaer, and Vérionique and Martine Wark. The official naming citation was published by the Minor Planet Center on 9 September 1995 (M.P.C. 25652).
