= 1293 Sonja =

Mars-crossing asteroid

Discovery
- Discovered by: E. Delporte
- Discovery site: Uccle Obs.
- Discovery date: 26 September 1933

Designations
- Named after: unknown
- Alternative designations: 1933 SO
- Minor planet category: Mars-crosser

Orbital characteristics
- Epoch 4 September 2017 (JD 2458000.5)
- Uncertainty parameter 0
- Observation arc: 83.39 yr (30,458 days)
- Aphelion: 2.8407 AU
- Perihelion: 1.6138 AU
- Semi-major axis: 2.2272 AU
- Eccentricity: 0.2754
- Orbital period (sidereal): 3.32 yr (1,214 days)
- Mean anomaly: 104.45°
- Mean motion: 0° 17^{m} 47.4^{s} / day
- Inclination: 5.3639°
- Longitude of ascending node: 236.38°
- Argument of perihelion: 99.831°

Physical characteristics
- Dimensions: 3.65±0.45 km 7.23 km (derived); 7.80±0.7 km (IRAS:3)
- Synodic rotation period: 2.876±0.001 h (Note: Not yet available on SAO/NASA Astrophysics Data System (ADS): Klinglesmith 2017, see summary figures at LCDB entry for (1293) Sonja); 2.8768±0.0003 h (Note: Pravec (2016) web: light-curve taken on 2016-07-09. Rotation period 2.8768±0.0003 hours with a brightness amplitude of 0.18 mag and Quality Code of 3. Summary figures for (1293) Sonja at Collaborative Asteroid Lightcurve Link (CALL) and Pravec, P.; Wolf, M.; Sarounova, L. (2016)) (Note: Rotational light-curve plot of (1293) Sonja from 2016. Ondrejov Asteroid Photometry Project from unpublished data by Peter Kušnirák and Petr Pravec); 2.87797±0.00002 h (Note: Pravec (2008) web: rotation period 2.87797±0.00002 hours with a brightness amplitude of 0.16 mag. Summary figures for (1293) Sonja at Collaborative Asteroid Lightcurve Link (CALL) and Pravec, P.; Wolf, M.; Sarounova, L. (2008)) (Note: Rotational light-curve plot of (1293) Sonja from 2008. Ondrejov Asteroid Photometry Project from unpublished data by Petr Pravec); 2.878±0.001 h 2.8785±0.0001 h 2.879±0.001 h (Note: Not yet available on SAO/NASA Astrophysics Data System (ADS): Stephens 2017b, see summary figures at LCDB entry for (1293) Sonja) (Note: Rotational light-curve plot of (1293) Sonja from July 2016. Published at the Center for Solar System Studies (CS3) by Robert Stephens); 2.879±0.002 h 2.881±0.002 h (Note: Not yet available on SAO/NASA Astrophysics Data System (ADS): Aznar 2017b, see summary figures at LCDB entry for (1293) Sonja)
- Geometric albedo: 0.1226 (derived); 0.4598±0.095 (IRAS:3); 0.529±0.133
- Spectral type: SMASS = Sq · S
- Absolute magnitude (H): 12.00 · 13.50 · 13.6 · 13.86±0.32

1293 Sonja, provisional designation 1933 SO, is a stony asteroid and bright Mars-crosser from the innermost regions of the asteroid belt, approximately 7 kilometers in diameter. It was discovered on 26 September 1933, by Belgian astronomer Eugène Delporte at Uccle Observatory in Belgium. Two nights later, Sonja was independently discovered by Soviet astronomer Grigory Neujmin at Simeiz on the Crimean peninsula. The origin of the asteroid's name is unknown.

== Orbit and classification ==
In the SMASS taxonomy, Sonja is classified as a Sq-type, an intermediary between the abundant S and rather rare Q-type asteroids. It orbits the Sun in the inner main-belt at a distance of 1.6–2.8 AU once every 3 years and 4 months (1,214 days). Its orbit has an eccentricity of 0.28 and an inclination of 5° with respect to the ecliptic. Sonja's observation arc begins with its official discovery observation at Uccle, as no precoveries were taken and no prior identifications were made.

== Physical characteristics ==
=== Rotation period ===
Several well-defined rotational lightcurves of Sonja were obtained from photometric observations during 2003–2016. Light-curve analysis gave a concurring rotation period of 2.876–2.879 hours with a brightness variation between 0.14 and 0.21 magnitude.

In 2006, the first lightcurve was obtained by David Higgins (U=3), followed by Federico Manzini and Vladimir Benishek (U=3/3-). Photometric observations continued in August 2008, by Petr Pravec at Ondřejov Observatory (U=3), and in 2016, four more lightcurves were obtained by Peter Kušnirák and Petr Pravec, as well as by Robert Stephens, Daniel Klinglesmith and Isaac Aznar (U=3/3/3/3).

=== Diameter and albedo ===
According to the surveys carried out by the Japanese Akari satellite and the Infrared Astronomical Satellite IRAS, Sonja measures 3.65 and 7.80 kilometers in diameter, and its surface has an exceptionally high albedo of 0.53 and 0.46, respectively. This would make Sonja one of the brightest known Mars-crossing asteroids. However, the Collaborative Asteroid Lightcurve Link derives an albedo of 0.1226 and a diameter of 7.23 kilometers with an absolute magnitude of 13.6.

== Naming ==
It is unknown as to whether the name "Sonja" refers to any known place, person or occurrence. It was speculated that "Sonja" could have been chosen based on the two letter of its provisional designation, 1933 SO. It is also speculated, that the name "Sonja" might have been on a list of generic German female names sent by the German ARI to several discoverers of minor planets in 1913, requesting the immediate naming of their discoveries in order to avoid confusion and possible errors (RI 1039; AN 196 and 137).

=== Unknown meaning ===
Among the many thousands of named minor planets, Sonja is one of 120 asteroids, for which no official naming citation has been published. All of these low-numbered asteroids have numbers between 164 Eva and 1514 Ricouxa and were discovered between 1876 and the 1930s, predominantly by astronomers Auguste Charlois, Johann Palisa, Max Wolf and Karl Reinmuth.
