= 1124 Stroobantia =

Metallic asteroid

Discovery
- Discovered by: E. Delporte
- Discovery site: Uccle Obs.
- Discovery date: 6 October 1928

Designations
- Named after: Paul Stroobant (Belgian astronomer)
- Alternative designations: 1928 TB · 1926 FC; 1930 BK · 1951 DJ
- Minor planet category: main-belt · (outer)

Orbital characteristics
- Epoch 16 February 2017 (JD 2457800.5)
- Uncertainty parameter 0
- Observation arc: 86.39 yr (31,554 days)
- Aphelion: 3.0157 AU
- Perihelion: 2.8384 AU
- Semi-major axis: 2.9271 AU
- Eccentricity: 0.0303
- Orbital period (sidereal): 5.01 yr (1,829 days)
- Mean anomaly: 309.88°
- Mean motion: 0° 11^{m} 48.48^{s} / day
- Inclination: 7.7935°
- Longitude of ascending node: 22.248°
- Argument of perihelion: 264.49°

Physical characteristics
- Dimensions: 24.450±0.140 km 24.65±1.1 km (IRAS:9); 25.823±0.121 km 27.03±0.70 km 29.68±0.57 km
- Synodic rotation period: 16.39 h 17.0±0.2 h
- Geometric albedo: 0.108±0.014; 0.135±0.008; 0.1454±0.0165; 0.1569±0.015 (IRAS:9)
- Spectral type: B–V = 0.702; U–B = 0.223; Tholen = X M · X
- Absolute magnitude (H): 10.67 · 10.67±0.22

1124 Stroobantia, provisional designation 1928 TB, is a metallic asteroid from the outer region of the asteroid belt, approximately 25 kilometers in diameter. It was discovered on 6 October 1928, by Belgian astronomer Eugène Delporte at Uccle Observatory in Belgium. It is named for astronomer Paul Stroobant.

== Description ==
Stroobantia orbits the Sun at a distance of 2.8–3.0 AU once every 5.01 years (1,829 days). Its orbit has an eccentricity of 0.03 and an inclination of 8° with respect to the ecliptic. First identified as 1926 FC at Heidelberg in 1926, the asteroid's observation arc begins at Algiers Observatory in 1931, or three years after its official discovery observation at Uccle.

== Physical characteristics ==
In the Tholen taxonomy, Stroobantia is classified as a generic X-type asteroid. It was grouped it into the metallic subcategory of M-type asteroid by a spectroscopic survey of X-type asteroids using the TNG, NTT and IRTF telescopes.

=== Rotation period ===
Two fragmentary rotational lightcurves of Stroobantia were obtained from photometric observations by Ricardo Gil-Hutton at the Félix Aguilar Observatory in Argentina, and by French amateur astronomers Laurent Bernasconi. Lightcuve analysis gave a rotation period of 16.39 and 17.0 hours with a brightness amplitude of 0.15 and 0.06 magnitude, respectively (U=1/1).

=== Diameter and albedo ===
According to the surveys carried out by the Infrared Astronomical Satellite IRAS, the Japanese Akari satellite, and NASA's Wide-field Infrared Survey Explorer with its subsequent NEOWISE mission, Stroobantia measures between 24.45 and 29.68 kilometers in diameter, and its surface has an albedo between 0.108 and 0.1569. The Collaborative Asteroid Lightcurve Link adopts the results obtained by IRAS, that is, an albedo of 0.1569 and a diameter of 24.65 kilometers with an absolute magnitude of 10.67.

== Naming ==
This minor planet was named for Paul Stroobant (1868–1936), a Belgian astronomer and director of the Uccle Observatory, where this asteroid was discovered. Stroobant's research included the number, mass and distribution of the minor planets. Naming citation was first mentioned in The Names of the Minor Planets by Paul Herget in 1955 (H 105).
