= 1707 Chantal =

Stony background asteroid from the Florian region in the inner asteroid belt

Discovery
- Discovered by: E. Delporte
- Discovery site: Uccle Obs.
- Discovery date: 8 September 1932

Designations
- Named after: Niece of astronomer Georges Roland
- Alternative designations: 1932 RL · 1942 TC; 1950 BF_{1} · 1955 QA_{1} A906 YJ
- Minor planet category: main-belt · (inner) background

Orbital characteristics
- Epoch 27 April 2019 (JD 2458600.5)
- Uncertainty parameter 0
- Observation arc: 111.83 yr (40,847 d)
- Aphelion: 2.5989 AU
- Perihelion: 1.8390 AU
- Semi-major axis: 2.2189 AU
- Eccentricity: 0.1712
- Orbital period (sidereal): 3.31 yr (1,207 d)
- Mean anomaly: 37.923°
- Mean motion: 0° 17^{m} 53.52^{s} / day
- Inclination: 4.0315°
- Longitude of ascending node: 6.1128°
- Argument of perihelion: 42.974°

Physical characteristics
- Mean diameter: 7.459±0.114 km 7.578±0.291 km 7.62±1.37 km
- Synodic rotation period: 10 h (at least)
- Geometric albedo: 0.28; 0.2969; 0.306
- Spectral type: Tholen = S B–V = 0.870; U–B = 0.530
- Absolute magnitude (H): 12.54; 12.79

1707 Chantal, provisional designation 1932 RL, is a stony background asteroid from the Florian region in the inner asteroid belt, approximately 7.5 kilometers (4.7 miles) in diameter. It was discovered on 8 September 1932, by astronomer Eugène Delporte at the Royal Observatory of Belgium in Uccle. The S-type asteroid has a rotation period of at least 10 hours. It was named for Chantal, the niece of Belgian astronomer Georges Roland.

== Orbit and classification ==
According to modern HCM-analyses by Nesvorný, as well as by Milani and Knežević, Chantal is a non-family asteroid from the main belt's background population. In an older HCM-analysis (Zappalà (1990–97), it is a member of the Flora family (402), a giant asteroid family and the largest family of stony asteroids in the main-belt. It orbits the Sun in the inner asteroid belt at a distance of 1.8–2.6 AU once every 3 years and 4 months (1,207 days; semi-major axis of 2.22 AU). Its orbit has an eccentricity of 0.17 and an inclination of 4° with respect to the ecliptic. The asteroid was first observed as A906 YJ at the Heidelberg Observatory in December 1906. The body's observation arc begins at Uccle Observatory in October 1932, or seven weeks after its official discovery observation.

== Naming ==
This minor planet was named by the discoverer Eugène Delporte after Chantal, a niece of Belgian astronomer Georges Roland (1922–1991) of Uccle and co-discoverer of the Comet Arend–Roland. The official naming citation was published by the Minor Planet Center on 8 April 1982 (M.P.C. 6832). Asteroid 1711 Sandrine was also named by the discoverer after a (grand)-niece of Roland.

== Physical characteristics ==
In the Tholen classification, Chantal is a common, stony S-type asteroid.

=== Rotation period ===
In October 1975, a rotational lightcurve of Chantal was obtained from photometric observations by Swedish astronomer Claes-Ingvar Lagerkvist at the Uppsala Astronomical Observatory. Analysis of the fragmentary lightcurve gave a rotation period of at least 10 hours with a brightness amplitude of more than 0.2 magnitude (U=1).

=== Diameter and albedo ===
According to the survey carried out by the NEOWISE mission of NASA's Wide-field Infrared Survey Explorer, Chantal measures between 7.46 and 7.62 kilometers in diameter and its surface has an albedo between 0.28 and 0.31. The Collaborative Asteroid Lightcurve Link assumes a standard albedo for a stony asteroid of 0.20 and calculates a diameter of 9.23 kilometers based on an absolute magnitude of 12.54.
