= 1486 Marilyn =

Main-belt asteroid

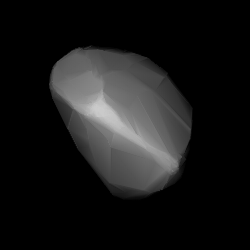
- Shape of Marilyn modelled from its lightcurve

Discovery
- Discovered by: E. Delporte
- Discovery site: Uccle Obs.
- Discovery date: 23 August 1938

Designations
- Named after: Marilyn Herget (daughter of astronomer); Paul Herget
- Alternative designations: 1938 QA
- Minor planet category: main-belt · (inner) background

Orbital characteristics
- Epoch 4 September 2017 (JD 2458000.5)
- Uncertainty parameter 0
- Observation arc: 79.11 yr (28,894 days)
- Aphelion: 2.4725 AU
- Perihelion: 1.9245 AU
- Semi-major axis: 2.1985 AU
- Eccentricity: 0.1246
- Orbital period (sidereal): 3.26 yr (1,191 days)
- Mean anomaly: 93.483°
- Mean motion: 0° 18^{m} 8.64^{s} / day
- Inclination: 0.0751°
- Longitude of ascending node: 333.23°
- Argument of perihelion: 350.11°

Physical characteristics
- Dimensions: 6.13±0.42 km 6.414±0.086 km 6.925±0.051 km 8.18 km (calculated)
- Synodic rotation period: 2.2837±0.0001 h (dated); 4.566±0.004 h 4.566945±0.000001 h 4.56695±0.00005 h 4.568±0.001 h
- Geometric albedo: 0.20 (assumed); 0.3118±0.0507; 0.391±0.041
- Spectral type: S (assumed)
- Absolute magnitude (H): 12.70 · 12.8 · 12.93±0.25

1486 Marilyn, provisional designation 1938 QA, is a stony background asteroid from the inner regions of the asteroid belt, approximately 6.5 kilometers in diameter. It was discovered on 23 August 1938, by Belgian astronomer Eugène Delporte at the Royal Observatory of Belgium in Uccle. The asteroid was named after Marilyn Herget, daughter of astronomer Paul Herget.

== Orbit and classification ==
Marilyn is a non-family asteroid from the main belt's background population. It orbits the Sun in the inner asteroid belt at a distance of 1.9–2.5 AU once every 3 years and 3 months (1,191 days). Its orbit has an eccentricity of 0.12 and an inclination of 0° with respect to the ecliptic. The body's observation arc begins with its official discovery observation at Uccle. No precoveries were taken.

== Physical characteristics ==
Marilyn is an assumed stony S-type asteroid.

=== Rotation period ===
In August and September 2013, two rotational lightcurves of Marilyn were obtained from photometric observations. Lightcurve analysis gave a well-defined rotation period of 4.566 and 4.568 hours with a brightness variation of 0.48 and 0.42 magnitude, respectively (U=3/3). The results supersede a period of 2.2837 hours (half the previous period solution) from a fragmentary lightcurve obtained by Maurice Audejean in March 2012 (U=1+).

=== Spin axis ===
The studies have also modeled the asteroid's lightcurve, using photometric data from the Lowell Photometric Database (LPD) and other sources. Modelling gave a concurring period of 4.566945 and 4.56695 hours, respectively. Each of the two studies also gave two spin axis in ecliptic coordinates (λ, β): (83.0°, −57°) and (270.0°, –62.0°), as well as (88.0°, −88°) and (267.0°, −66°).

=== Diameter and albedo ===
According to the survey carried out by the NEOWISE mission of NASA's Wide-field Infrared Survey Explorer, Marilyn measures between 6.13 and 6.925 kilometers in diameter and its surface has an albedo between 0.3118 and 0.391.

The Collaborative Asteroid Lightcurve Link assumes a standard albedo for stony asteroids of 0.20 and calculates a diameter of 8.18 kilometers based on an absolute magnitude of 12.8.

== Naming ==
This minor planet was named after Marilyn Herget, daughter of American astronomer Paul Herget, who computed the body's orbit (H 133). Herget is also the author of The Names of the Minor Planets first released in the 1950s. The asteroid 1751 Herget was named after him.
