= 1672 Gezelle =

Carbonaceous asteroid

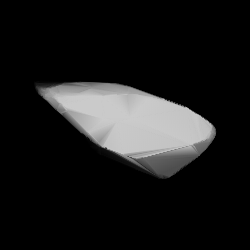
- Shape model of Gezelle from its lightcurve

Discovery
- Discovered by: E. Delporte
- Discovery site: Uccle Obs.
- Discovery date: 29 January 1935

Designations
- Named after: Guido Gezelle (poet and priest)
- Alternative designations: 1935 BD · 1929 AA; 1933 SE_{1} · 1939 VK; 1950 SX · 1978 NA_{8} A924 EO
- Minor planet category: main-belt · (outer)

Orbital characteristics
- Epoch 4 September 2017 (JD 2458000.5)
- Uncertainty parameter 0
- Observation arc: 83.62 yr (30,542 days)
- Aphelion: 4.0486 AU
- Perihelion: 2.2952 AU
- Semi-major axis: 3.1719 AU
- Eccentricity: 0.2764
- Orbital period (sidereal): 5.65 yr (2,063 days)
- Mean anomaly: 183.87°
- Mean motion: 0° 10^{m} 28.2^{s} / day
- Inclination: 1.0672°
- Longitude of ascending node: 181.29°
- Argument of perihelion: 255.12°

Physical characteristics
- Dimensions: 26.205±0.202 km 26.335±0.216 km 26.56±1.86 km 27.90 km (calculated)
- Synodic rotation period: 40.6821±0.0001 h 40.6824±0.0005 h 40.72±0.01 h
- Geometric albedo: 0.055±0.004; 0.057 (assumed); 0.092±0.014; 0.0936±0.0162
- Spectral type: C
- Absolute magnitude (H): 11.10 · 11.1 · 11.46±0.32 · 11.5

1672 Gezelle, provisional designation 1935 BD, is a carbonaceous asteroid from the outer region of the asteroid belt, approximately 27 kilometers in diameter. It was discovered on 29 January 1935, by Belgian astronomer Eugène Delporte at Royal Observatory of Belgium in Uccle, Belgium. It was later named after Flemish poet and Roman Catholic priest Guido Gezelle.

== Orbit and classification ==
The C-type asteroid orbits the Sun at a distance of 2.3–4.0 AU once every 5 years and 8 months (2,063 days). Its orbit has an eccentricity of 0.28 and an inclination of 1° with respect to the ecliptic. Gezelle's first identification as A924 EO at Heidelberg Observatory remained unused. Its observation arc begins 9 days after its official discovery observation.

== Physical characteristics ==
=== Rotation period ===
Astronomer James W. Brinsfield obtained a rotational lightcurve of Gezelle at the Via Capote Observatory (G69) in October 2008. It gave a well defined rotation period of 40.72 hours with a brightness variation of 0.56 magnitude (U=3). In 2016, similar periods of 40.6821 and 40.6824 hours were obtained from modeled photometric observations derived from the Lowell Photometric Database and other sources (U=n.a.).

=== Diameter and albedo ===
According to the surveys carried out by the Japanese Akari satellite and NASA's Wide-field Infrared Survey Explorer with its subsequent NEOWISE mission, Gezelle measures between 26.21 and 26.56 kilometers in diameter and its surface has an albedo between 0.055 and 0.093. The Collaborative Asteroid Lightcurve Link assumes a standard albedo for carbonaceous asteroids of 0.057 and calculates a diameter of 27.90 kilometers based on an absolute magnitude of 11.5.

== Naming ==
This minor planet was named in memory of famous Flemish poet and Roman Catholic priest Guido Gezelle (1830–1899), who wrote extensively on religion and nature. The official naming citation was published by the Minor Planet Center on 8 April 1982 (M.P.C. 6832).
