= Goffin =

Goffin is a surname, and may refer to:

- Albert Goffin (died 1958), Belgian banker, civil servant and governor of the National Bank of Belgium
- Andreas Leopold Goffin (1837-1863), Dutch naval officer and the eponym of Goffin's cockatoo
- Billy Goffin (1920–1987), English footballer
- David Goffin (born 1990), Belgian tennis player
- Dean Goffin (1916–1984), New Zealand musical composer
- Evi Goffin (born 1981), Belgian vocalist
- Gerry Goffin (1939–2014), American lyricist
- Louise Goffin (born 1963), singer, songwriter and musician
- Joel Goffin (born 1981), American film composer
- Peter Goffin (1906–1974), English set and costume designer and stage manager
- Robert Goffin (1898–1984), Belgian lawyer, author and poet, credited with writing the first "serious" book on jazz

== See also ==
- 1722 Goffin, an asteroid
- Coffin (surname)
- Tanimbar corella (Cacatua goffiniana) also known as Goffin's cockatoo
