= 1374 Isora =

Mars-crossing asteroid

Discovery
- Discovered by: E. Delporte
- Discovery site: Uccle Obs.
- Discovery date: 21 October 1935

Designations
- Named after: Constructed female name ("Rosi" spelled backwards)
- Alternative designations: 1935 UA
- Minor planet category: Mars-crosser

Orbital characteristics
- Epoch 16 February 2017 (JD 2457800.5)
- Uncertainty parameter 0
- Observation arc: 81.05 yr (29,604 days)
- Aphelion: 2.8775 AU
- Perihelion: 1.6230 AU
- Semi-major axis: 2.2502 AU
- Eccentricity: 0.2788
- Orbital period (sidereal): 3.38 yr (1,233 days)
- Mean anomaly: 44.987°
- Mean motion: 0° 17^{m} 31.2^{s} / day
- Inclination: 5.2943°
- Longitude of ascending node: 302.56°
- Argument of perihelion: 60.988°
- Earth MOID: 0.6290 AU

Physical characteristics
- Dimensions: 5.48 km (derived)
- Synodic rotation period: 8±2 h 36.699±0.001 h
- Geometric albedo: 0.20 (assumed)
- Spectral type: SMASS = Sq · S
- Absolute magnitude (H): 13.00 · 13.3 · 13.32±0.32 · 13.67±0.15

1374 Isora, provisional designation 1935 UA, is a stony asteroid and eccentric Mars-crosser from the innermost regions of the asteroid belt, approximately 5 kilometers in diameter. It was discovered on 21 October 1935, by Belgian astronomer Eugène Delporte at Uccle Observatory in Belgium.

== Orbit and classification ==
In the SMASS taxonomy, Isora is classified as a Sq-type, an intermediary between the abundant S and rather rare Q-type asteroids. It orbits the Sun at a distance of 1.6–2.9 AU once every 3 years and 5 months (1,233 days). Its orbit has an eccentricity of 0.28 and an inclination of 5° with respect to the ecliptic. Isora's observation arc begins with its official discovery observation at Uccle, as no precoveries were taken and no prior identifications were made.

== Physical characteristics ==
In January 2014, a rotational light-curve of Isora was obtained by American astronomer Robert D. Stephens at the Center for Solar System Studies (CS3) in California. Light-curve analysis gave a longer than average rotation period of 36.699 hours with a brightness variation of 0.12 magnitude (U=2+). However, a second period solution of 18.35 hours is also possible. The result supersedes photometric observations taken by Wiesław Z. Wiśniewski in 1989, which rendered a fragmentary light-curve with a period of 8 hours (U=1).

The Collaborative Asteroid Lightcurve Link assumes a standard albedo for stony asteroids of 0.20 and derives a diameter of 5.48 kilometers using an absolute magnitude of 13.67.

== Naming ==
Isora is the backwards spelled feminine name "Rosi" with an appended "a". Naming was proposed by Gustav Stracke (1887–1943) – astronomer at the German Astronomisches Rechen-Institut, and after whom the minor planet 1019 Strackea is named – and first cited by Paul Herget in his The Names of the Minor Planets in 1955 (H 125).
