= Catalog of Components of Double and Multiple Stars =

Astrometric star catalogue

- Alternative names: CCDM

The Catalog of Components of Double and Multiple Stars, or CCDM, is an astrometric star catalogue of double and multiple stars. It was made by Jean Dommanget and Omer Nys at the Royal Observatory of Belgium in order to provide an input catalogue of stars for the Hipparcos mission. The published first edition of the catalog, released in 1994, has entries for 74,861 components of 34,031 double and multiple stars; the second edition, in 2002, has been expanded to provide entries for 105,838 components of 49,325 double and multiple stars. The catalog lists positions, magnitudes, spectral types, and proper motions for each component.
