= 1291 Phryne =

Main-belt asteroid

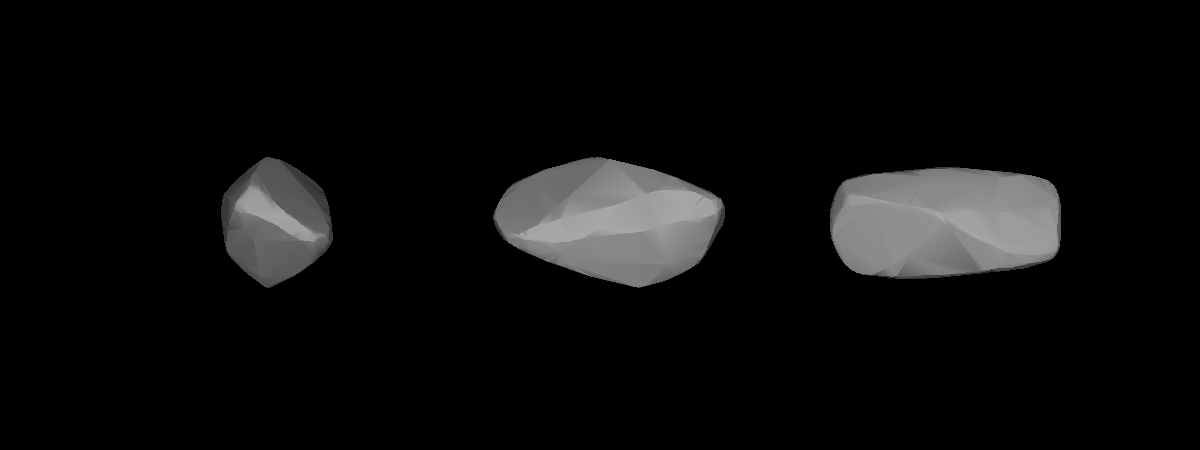
- Lightcurve-based 3D-model of Phryne

Discovery
- Discovered by: E. Delporte
- Discovery site: Uccle Obs.
- Discovery date: 15 September 1933

Designations
- Pronunciation: /ˈfraɪniː/
- Named after: Φρύνη Phrȳnē (ancient Greek courtesan)
- Alternative designations: 1933 RA · 1931 DX; 1932 KJ · 1953 JS; A907 TA · A922 NA
- Minor planet category: main-belt · (outer); Eos

Orbital characteristics
- Epoch 4 September 2017 (JD 2458000.5)
- Uncertainty parameter 0
- Observation arc: 109.08 yr (39,843 days)
- Aphelion: 3.2977 AU
- Perihelion: 2.7292 AU
- Semi-major axis: 3.0134 AU
- Eccentricity: 0.0943
- Orbital period (sidereal): 5.23 yr (1,911 days)
- Mean anomaly: 29.198°
- Mean motion: 0° 11^{m} 18.24^{s} / day
- Inclination: 9.1061°
- Longitude of ascending node: 215.38°
- Argument of perihelion: 118.83°

Physical characteristics
- Dimensions: 24.954±0.275 km 26.52 km (derived); 26.78±2.2 km 27.418±0.149 km 31.13±0.52 km
- Synodic rotation period: 5.55 h 5.58410±0.00007 h 5.584139±0.000001 h 5.58414±0.00005 h
- Geometric albedo: 0.127±0.019; 0.1355 (derived); 0.141±0.005; 0.1537±0.0198; 0.1818±0.033
- Spectral type: S B–V = 0.835; U–B = 0.395
- Absolute magnitude (H): 10.3 · 10.33 · 10.67

1291 Phryne, provisional designation 1933 RA, is an Eoan asteroid from the outer regions of the asteroid belt, approximately 27 kilometers in diameter. It was discovered on 15 September 1933, by Belgian astronomer Eugène Delporte at the Royal Observatory of Belgium in Uccle. The asteroid was named after the ancient Greek courtesan Phryne.

== Orbit and classification ==
Phryne is a member the Eos family (606), the largest asteroid family in the outer main belt consisting of nearly 10,000 asteroids. It orbits the Sun at a distance of 2.7–3.3 AU once every 5 years and 3 months (1,911 days). Its orbit has an eccentricity of 0.09 and an inclination of 9° with respect to the ecliptic. The body's observation arc begins with its first identification as A907 TA at Heidelberg Observatory in October 1907.

== Physical characteristics ==
Phryne is an assumed stony S-type asteroid, while the Eon family's overall spectral type is that of a K-type.

=== Rotation period ===
In May 1984, a rotational lightcurve of Phryne was obtained by astronomer Richard Binzel. Lightcurve analysis gave a well-defined rotation period of 5.55 hours with a brightness variation of 0.86 magnitude (U=3). In August 2006, from photometric observations by French amateur astronomer Pierre Antonini gave a period of 5.58410 hours and an amplitude of 0.38 magnitude (U=3)

=== Poles ===
In 2011, a modeled lightcurve using data from the Uppsala Asteroid Photometric Catalogue (UAPC) and other sources gave a period 5.58414 hours, as well as two spin axis of (106.0°, 35.0°) and (277.0°, 59.0°) in ecliptic coordinates (λ, β). In 2017, a new study of the same international collaboration about the rotational states of Eoan asteroids gave a revised shape model with a period of 5.584139 hours and two spin axis of (109.0°, 33.0°) and (281.0°, 56.0°).

=== Diameter and albedo ===
According to the surveys carried out by the Infrared Astronomical Satellite IRAS, the Japanese Akari satellite and the NEOWISE mission of NASA's Wide-field Infrared Survey Explorer, Phryne measures between 24.954 and 31.13 kilometers in diameter and its surface has an albedo between 0.127 and 0.1818.

The Collaborative Asteroid Lightcurve Link derives an albedo of 0.1355 and a diameter of 26.52 kilometers based on an absolute magnitude of 10.67.

== Naming ==
This minor planet was named after Phryne, the beautiful ancient Greek courtesan (hetaira) of the 4th century B.C. Supposedly, she was the model for the statue Aphrodite of Knidos by ancient Greek sculptor Praxiteles (see asteroid 5983), who was also her lover. It was the first nude statue of a woman from ancient Greece. The official naming citation was mentioned in The Names of the Minor Planets by Paul Herget in 1955 (H 118).
