= 1294 Antwerpia =

Dark background asteroid

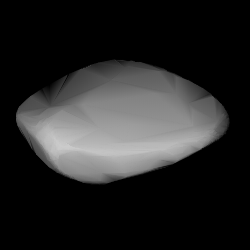
- Shape model of Antwerpia from its lightcurve

Discovery
- Discovered by: E. Delporte
- Discovery site: Uccle Obs.
- Discovery date: 24 October 1933

Designations
- Named after: Antwerp (Belgian city)
- Alternative designations: 1933 UB_{1} · 1930 AF; 1932 LC · 1964 VA_{2} 1964 XF · A917 DB
- Minor planet category: main-belt · (middle); background

Orbital characteristics
- Epoch 4 September 2017 (JD 2458000.5)
- Uncertainty parameter 0
- Observation arc: 99.63 yr (36,391 days)
- Aphelion: 3.3156 AU
- Perihelion: 2.0572 AU
- Semi-major axis: 2.6864 AU
- Eccentricity: 0.2342
- Orbital period (sidereal): 4.40 yr (1,608 days)
- Mean anomaly: 16.166°
- Mean motion: 0° 13^{m} 25.68^{s} / day
- Inclination: 8.7271°
- Longitude of ascending node: 81.133°
- Argument of perihelion: 313.22°

Physical characteristics
- Mean diameter: 27.82±7.33 km 34.71±3.0 km 34.80±0.66 km 37.199±0.134 km 40.717±0.350 km
- Synodic rotation period: 6.63±0.01 h
- Pole ecliptic latitude: (128.0°, −66.0°) (λ_{1}/β_{1}); (246.0°, −76.0°) (λ_{2}/β_{2})
- Geometric albedo: 0.0887±0.0283; 0.10±0.09; 0.117±0.024; 0.1220±0.024; 0.125±0.005
- Spectral type: SMASS = C; C (S3OS2)
- Absolute magnitude (H): 10.20 · 10.549±0.003 (R) · 10.60 · 10.7

1294 Antwerpia (prov. designation: 1933 UB_{1}) is a dark background asteroid from the central regions of the asteroid belt. It was discovered on 24 October 1933, by astronomer Eugène Delporte at the Royal Observatory of Belgium in Uccle. The carbonaceous C-type asteroid has a rotation period of 6.6 hours and measures approximately 35 kilometers (22 miles) in diameter. It was named for the Belgian city of Antwerp.

== Orbit and classification ==
Antwerpia is a non-family asteroid of the main belt's background population when applying the hierarchical clustering method to its proper orbital elements. It orbits the Sun in the central main belt at a distance of 2.1–3.3 AU once every 4 years and 5 months (1,608 days). Its orbit has an eccentricity of 0.23 and an inclination of 9° with respect to the ecliptic. the asteroid was first observed as A917 DB at Heidelberg Observatory in February 2017, where the body's observation arc begins one month later in March 2017.

== Naming ==
This minor planet was named after the city of Antwerp in Flanders, the Dutch-speaking part of Belgium. The official naming citation was mentioned in The Names of the Minor Planets by Paul Herget in 1955 (H 118).

== Physical characteristics ==
In the SMASS classification, Antwerpia is a carbonaceous C-type asteroid. It is also a C-type in both the Tholen- and SMASS-like taxonomy of the Small Solar System Objects Spectroscopic Survey (S3OS2).

=== Rotation period and poles ===
Several rotational lightcurves of Antwerpia have been obtained from photometric observations since 2005. Lightcurve analysis gave a rotation period of 6.63 hours with a brightness variation of 0.42 magnitude (U=1/3/3-/3-/3/2). (Note: Lightcurve plot of (1297) Quadea with a rotation period 6.62 hours and a brightness amplitude of 0.42 mag. Quality Code of 3. Taken by Robert Stephens (2014) at U81/CS3. Summary figures at LCDB)

A 2016-published lightcurve, using modeled photometric data from the Lowell Photometric Database (LPD), gave a concurring period of 6.62521 hours (U=n.a.), as well as two spin axes of (128.0°, −66.0°) and (246.0°, −76.0°) in ecliptic coordinates (λ, β).

=== Diameter and albedo ===
According to the surveys carried out by the Infrared Astronomical Satellite IRAS, the Japanese Akari satellite and the NEOWISE mission of NASA's Wide-field Infrared Survey Explorer, Antwerpia measures between 27.82 and 40.717 kilometers in diameter and its surface has an albedo between 0.0887 and 0.125. The Collaborative Asteroid Lightcurve Link derives an albedo of 0.0783 and a diameter of 34.40 kilometers based on an absolute magnitude of 10.7.
