= 1199 Geldonia =

Main-belt asteroid

Discovery
- Discovered by: E. Delporte
- Discovery site: Uccle Obs.
- Discovery date: 14 September 1931

Designations
- Pronunciation: /ɡɛlˈdoʊniə/
- Named after: Jodoigne (Belgian city)
- Alternative designations: 1931 RF · 1930 MB; 1946 OH · 1958 WC; A921 TF
- Minor planet category: main-belt · (outer); Eos

Orbital characteristics
- Epoch 4 September 2017 (JD 2458000.5)
- Uncertainty parameter 0
- Observation arc: 95.48 yr (34,873 days)
- Aphelion: 3.1016 AU
- Perihelion: 2.9337 AU
- Semi-major axis: 3.0177 AU
- Eccentricity: 0.0278
- Orbital period (sidereal): 5.24 yr (1,915 days)
- Mean anomaly: 324.45°
- Mean motion: 0° 11^{m} 16.8^{s} / day
- Inclination: 8.7917°
- Longitude of ascending node: 235.63°
- Argument of perihelion: 291.33°

Physical characteristics
- Dimensions: 30.395±0.243 km 31.25±3.0 km 32.858±0.315 km 35.88±0.50 km 36.08±0.58 km
- Synodic rotation period: 28.3±0.2 h
- Geometric albedo: 0.098±0.004; 0.098±0.010; 0.1182±0.0108; 0.1299±0.029
- Spectral type: Tholen = CGTP: B–V = 0.760; U–B = 0.330
- Absolute magnitude (H): 10.36

1199 Geldonia (provisional designation 1931 RF) is an Eoan asteroid from the outer regions of the asteroid belt, approximately 32 kilometers in diameter. It was discovered on 14 September 1931, by Belgian astronomer Eugène Delporte at the Royal Observatory of Belgium in Uccle. The asteroid was named after the Belgian town of Jodoigne.

== Orbit and classification ==
Geldonia is a member the Eos family (606), the largest asteroid family of the outer main belt consisting of nearly 10,000 asteroids. It orbits the Sun at a distance of 2.9–3.1 AU once every 5 years and 3 months (1,915 days). Its orbit has an eccentricity of 0.03 and an inclination of 9° with respect to the ecliptic.

The body's observation arc begins with its first identification as A921 TF at Heidelberg Observatory in October 1921, almost 10 years prior to its official discovery observation at Uccle.

== Physical characteristics ==
In the Tholen classification, Geldonia has an ambiguous spectral type, closest to a carbonaceous C-type asteroid with some similarities to the G-, T- and the primitive P-type asteroids, and was flagged as a nosy spectrum (CGTP:). The overall spectral type for members of the Eoan family on the other hand is that of a K-type.

=== Rotation period ===
In November 2010, a rotational lightcurve of Geldonia was obtained from photometric observations by Italian astronomer Silvano Casulli. Lightcurve analysis gave a longer-than-average rotation period of 28.3 hours with a brightness amplitude of 0.11 magnitude (U=2-). While not being a slow rotator, which have periods longer than 100 hours, Geldonia's spin rate is still longer than that of most minor planets, which typically rotate between 2 and 20 hours once around their axis.

=== Diameter and albedo ===
According to the surveys carried out by the Japanese Akari satellite and the NEOWISE mission of NASA's Wide-field Infrared Survey Explorer, Geldonia measures between 30.395 and 36.08 kilometers in diameter and its surface has an albedo between 0.098 and 0.1182.

The Collaborative Asteroid Lightcurve Link adopts the results obtained by Infrared Astronomical Satellite, that is, an albedo of 0.1299 and a diameter of 31.25 kilometers based on an absolute magnitude of 10.36.

== Naming ==
This minor planet was named after the Belgian town of Jodoigne, also known by its Latin name of Geldenaken (hence the asteroid's name of "Geldonia"). It is the native town of the discoverer Eugène Delporte. The official naming citation was mentioned in The Names of the Minor Planets by Paul Herget in 1955 (H 111).
