= 1221 Amor =

Asteroid and near-Earth object

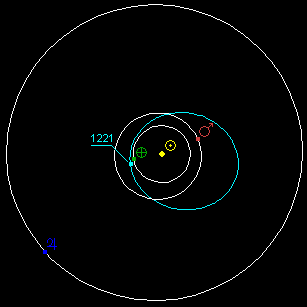
- Orbital diagram of Amor (cyan) with Earth, Mars and Jupiter (outermost) on 12 March 1932

Discovery
- Discovered by: E. Delporte
- Discovery site: Uccle Obs.
- Discovery date: 12 March 1932

Designations
- Pronunciation: /ˈæmɔːr/
- Named after: Cupid, Roman analogue of Eros (Classical mythology)
- Alternative designations: 1932 EA_{1}
- Minor planet category: NEO; Amor; Amor (II)
- Adjectives: Amorian /əˈmɔːriən/
- Symbol: (astrological)

Orbital characteristics
- Epoch 23 March 2018 (JD 2458200.5)
- Uncertainty parameter 0
- Observation arc: 86.50 yr (31,595 d)
- Aphelion: 2.7550 AU
- Perihelion: 1.0832 AU
- Semi-major axis: 1.9191 AU
- Eccentricity: 0.4355
- Orbital period (sidereal): 2.66 yr (971 d)
- Mean anomaly: 102.03°
- Mean motion: 0° 22^{m} 14.52^{s} / day
- Inclination: 11.879°
- Longitude of ascending node: 171.34°
- Argument of perihelion: 26.656°
- Earth MOID: 0.1069 AU (41.6 LD)

Physical characteristics
- Mean diameter: 0.857 km (calculated); 1.0 km (est. T. Gehrels)
- Geometric albedo: 0.15 (assumed); 0.20 (assumed)
- Spectral type: S (assumed)
- Absolute magnitude (H): 17.6±0.2; 17.7

1221 Amor /ˈæmɔːr/ is an asteroid and near-Earth object on an eccentric orbit, approximately 1 kilometer (0.6 miles) in diameter. It is the namesake of the Amor asteroids, the second-largest subgroup of near-Earth objects. It was discovered by Eugène Delporte at the Uccle Observatory in 1932, the first time that an asteroid was seen to approach Earth so closely. The assumed S-type asteroid is one of few low-numbered asteroids for which no rotation period has been determined. It was assigned the provisional designation 1932 EA_{1} and named for Cupid, also known as "Amor" in Latin, the Roman equivalent of the Greek god Eros.

== Discovery ==
On 12 March 1932, Belgian astronomer Eugène Delporte photographed Amor at the Royal Observatory of Belgium in Uccle, as it approached Earth to within 16 million kilometers (about 40 times the distance from Earth to the Moon). This was the first time that an asteroid was seen to approach Earth so closely. The body's observation arc begins with its official discovery observation on 12 March 1932, when it was observed at the Uccle and Heidelberg observatories simultaneously.

== Orbit and classification ==
Amor is the namesake of the Amor asteroid, a subgroup of near-Earth asteroids that approach the orbit of Earth from beyond, but do not cross it. Next to the Apollo group, the Amors are the second largest group of near-Earth objects with more than 7,000 known members. As with many members of this group, Amor is also a Mars-crosser, crossing the orbit of the Red Planet at 1.66 AU.

It orbits the Sun at a distance of 1.08–2.76 AU once every 2 years and 8 months (971 days; semi-major axis of 1.92 AU). Its orbit has a high eccentricity of 0.44 and an inclination of 12° with respect to the ecliptic.

=== Close encounters ===
Amor has an Earth minimum orbital intersection distance of 0.1069 AU (16,000,000 km) which corresponds to 41.6 lunar distances. In March 1940, it approached Earth to 0.1052 AU (15,700,000 km), its closest approach of all close encounters since 1900. Only in March 2129, it will approach Earth at a similar distance of 0.1082 AU (16,200,000 km).

== Naming ==
This minor planet was named after the Roman god of love, Cupid, also known as Amor in Latin, and the Roman equivalent of the Greek god Eros. The near-Earth asteroids 433 Eros and 763 Cupido are also named after the god of love. The official naming citation was mentioned in The Names of the Minor Planets by Paul Herget in 1955 (H 113).

== Physical characteristics ==
Amor is an assumed, stony S-type asteroid.

=== Rotation period ===
As of 2018, no rotational lightcurve of Amor has been obtained from photometric observations. The body's rotation period, pole and shape remain unknown.

=== Diameter and albedo ===
According to Tom Gehrels's publication Hazards due to Comets and Asteroids from 1994 (pp. 540–543), Amor measures 1.0 kilometer in diameter and its surface has an albedo of 0.15. The Collaborative Asteroid Lightcurve Link assumes a standard albedo for stony asteroids of 0.20 and calculates a diameter of 0.857 kilometers based on an absolute magnitude of 17.7.
