= 1261 Legia =

Dark Themistian asteroid from the outer regions of the asteroid belt

Discovery
- Discovered by: E. Delporte
- Discovery site: Uccle Obs.
- Discovery date: 23 March 1933

Designations
- Pronunciation: /ˈliːdʒiə/
- Named after: Latin name for Liège (Belgian city)
- Alternative designations: 1933 FB · 1938 CS; 1938 DH · 1944 FD; 1966 DG
- Minor planet category: main-belt · (outer); Themis · background

Orbital characteristics
- Epoch 4 September 2017 (JD 2458000.5)
- Uncertainty parameter 0
- Observation arc: 84.28 yr (30,785 days)
- Aphelion: 3.6992 AU
- Perihelion: 2.5758 AU
- Semi-major axis: 3.1375 AU
- Eccentricity: 0.1790
- Orbital period (sidereal): 5.56 yr (2,030 days)
- Mean anomaly: 57.530°
- Mean motion: 0° 10^{m} 38.28^{s} / day
- Inclination: 2.4274°
- Longitude of ascending node: 67.282°
- Argument of perihelion: 104.64°

Physical characteristics
- Dimensions: 31.20 km (derived); 31.26±11.50 km 31.28±1.3 km 32.13±0.66 km 32.576±0.126 km 35.324±0.345 km 36.56±0.35 km
- Synodic rotation period: 8.693±0.007 h
- Geometric albedo: 0.048±0.009; 0.0564±0.0127; 0.06±0.05; 0.0601 (derived); 0.067±0.004; 0.070±0.003; 0.0719±0.006
- Spectral type: P · S (assumed)
- Absolute magnitude (H): 11.00 · 11.10 · 11.12±0.72 · 11.2 · 11.29

1261 Legia, provisional designation 1933 FB, is a dark Themistian asteroid from the outer regions of the asteroid belt, approximately 32 kilometers in diameter. It was discovered on 23 March 1933, by astronomer Eugène Delporte at the Royal Observatory of Belgium in Uccle. The asteroid was named for the Belgian city of Liège (Luke).

== Orbit and classification ==
Legia is a Themistian asteroid that belongs to the Themis family (602), a very large family of carbonaceous asteroids, named after 24 Themis. It is, however, a non-family asteroid of the main belt's background population when applying the hierarchical clustering method to its proper orbital elements.

It orbits the Sun in the outer asteroid belt at a distance of 2.6–3.7 AU once every 5 years and 7 months (2,030 days; semi-major axis of 3.14 AU). Its orbit has an eccentricity of 0.18 and an inclination of 2° with respect to the ecliptic.

The body's observation arc begins at Uccle in March 1933, five days after its official discovery observation.

== Physical characteristics ==
Legia has been characterized as a primitive and reddish P-type asteroid by the Wide-field Infrared Survey Explorer (WISE).

=== Rotation period ===
In January 2005, a rotational lightcurve of Legia was obtained from photometric observations by French amateur astronomer Laurent Bernasconi. Lightcurve analysis gave a rotation period of 8.693 hours with a brightness amplitude of 0.13 magnitude (U=2+).

=== Diameter and albedo ===
According to the surveys carried out by the Infrared Astronomical Satellite IRAS, the Japanese Akari satellite and the NEOWISE mission of NASA's WISE telescope, Legia measures between 31.26 and 36.56 kilometers in diameter and its surface has an albedo between 0.048 and 0.0719.

The Collaborative Asteroid Lightcurve Link derives an albedo of 0.0601 and a diameter of 31.20 kilometers based on an absolute magnitude of 11.2.

== Naming ==
This minor planet was named "Legia", the Latin name of the Belgian city of Liège (Luik). The official naming citation was mentioned in The Names of the Minor Planets by Paul Herget in 1955 (H 116).
