= 1848 Delvaux =

Stony main-belt asteroid

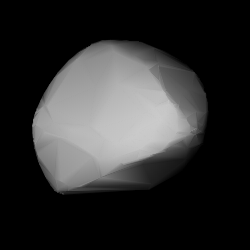
- Shape model of Delvaux from its lightcurve

Discovery
- Discovered by: E. Delporte
- Discovery site: Uccle Obs.
- Discovery date: 18 August 1933

Designations
- Named after: (sister-in-law of); Georges Roland
- Alternative designations: 1933 QD · 1936 DH; 1948 SF · 1948 SK; 1951 GV · 1952 ML; 1953 TU_{1} · 1953 VE_{1} 1956 GL · 1972 QN; 1975 FV · A912 FA
- Minor planet category: main-belt · Koronis

Orbital characteristics
- Epoch 4 September 2017 (JD 2458000.5)
- Uncertainty parameter 0
- Observation arc: 83.47 yr (30,486 days)
- Aphelion: 3.0019 AU
- Perihelion: 2.7407 AU
- Semi-major axis: 2.8713 AU
- Eccentricity: 0.0455
- Orbital period (sidereal): 4.87 yr (1,777 days)
- Mean anomaly: 138.35°
- Mean motion: 0° 12^{m} 9.36^{s} / day
- Inclination: 1.4404°
- Longitude of ascending node: 331.66°
- Argument of perihelion: 316.61°

Physical characteristics
- Dimensions: 16.66±1.95 km 17.030±0.114; 17.12 km (calculated); 17.446±0.143 km 17.51±0.63 km
- Synodic rotation period: 3.637 h (adopted); 3.638±0.001 h 3.639±0.001 h 3.639±0.001 h 3.65±0.01 h
- Geometric albedo: 0.2329±0.0432; 0.24 (assumed); 0.242±0.036; 0.255±0.020; 0.461±0.316
- Spectral type: SMASS = S · S
- Absolute magnitude (H): 10.35 · 10.90 · 11.0 · 11.24±0.10 · 11.26±0.40

1848 Delvaux (prov. designation: 1933 QD) is a stony Koronis asteroid from the outer region of the asteroid belt, approximately 17 kilometers in diameter. It was discovered on 18 August 1933, by Belgian astronomer Eugène Delporte at the Royal Observatory of Belgium in Uccle, Belgium. It was later named after astronomer Georges Roland's sister-in-law.

== Orbit and classification ==
Delvaux is a stony asteroid and a member of the Koronis family, a collisional group consisting of a few hundred known bodies with nearly ecliptical orbits. It orbits the Sun in the outer main-belt at a distance of 2.7–3.0 AU once every 4 years and 10 months (1,777 days). Its orbit has an eccentricity of 0.05 and an inclination of 1° with respect to the ecliptic. First identified as A912 FA at Simeiz Observatory in 1912, the body's observation arc begins 3 day after its official discovery, as non of the previous observations were used.

== Physical characteristics ==
In the SMASS taxonomy, Delvaux is a common S-type asteroid.

=== Rotation period ===
It has a well-determined rotation period of 3.63 to 3.65 hours with a brightness variation of 0.57–0.69 magnitude (U=3/3/3/3). The Collaborative Asteroid Lightcurve Link (CALL) adopts a period of 3.637 hours.

=== Diameter and albedo ===
According to the surveys carried out by the Japanese Akari satellite and NASA's Wide-field Infrared Survey Explorer with its subsequent NEOWISE mission, Delvaux measures between 16.66 and 17.51 kilometers in diameter, and its surface has an albedo of 0.233 to 0.461. CALL assumes a standard albedo for members of the Koronis family of 0.24, and calculates a diameter of 17.12 kilometers with an absolute magnitude of 11.0.

== Name ==
This minor planet was named after the sister-in-law of Georges Roland, astronomer at the observatory in Uccle and known as the co-discoverer of the comet Arend–Roland. The approved naming citation was published by the Minor Planet Center on 8 April 1982 (M.P.C. 6832).
