= Litke (crater) =

Crater on the Moon

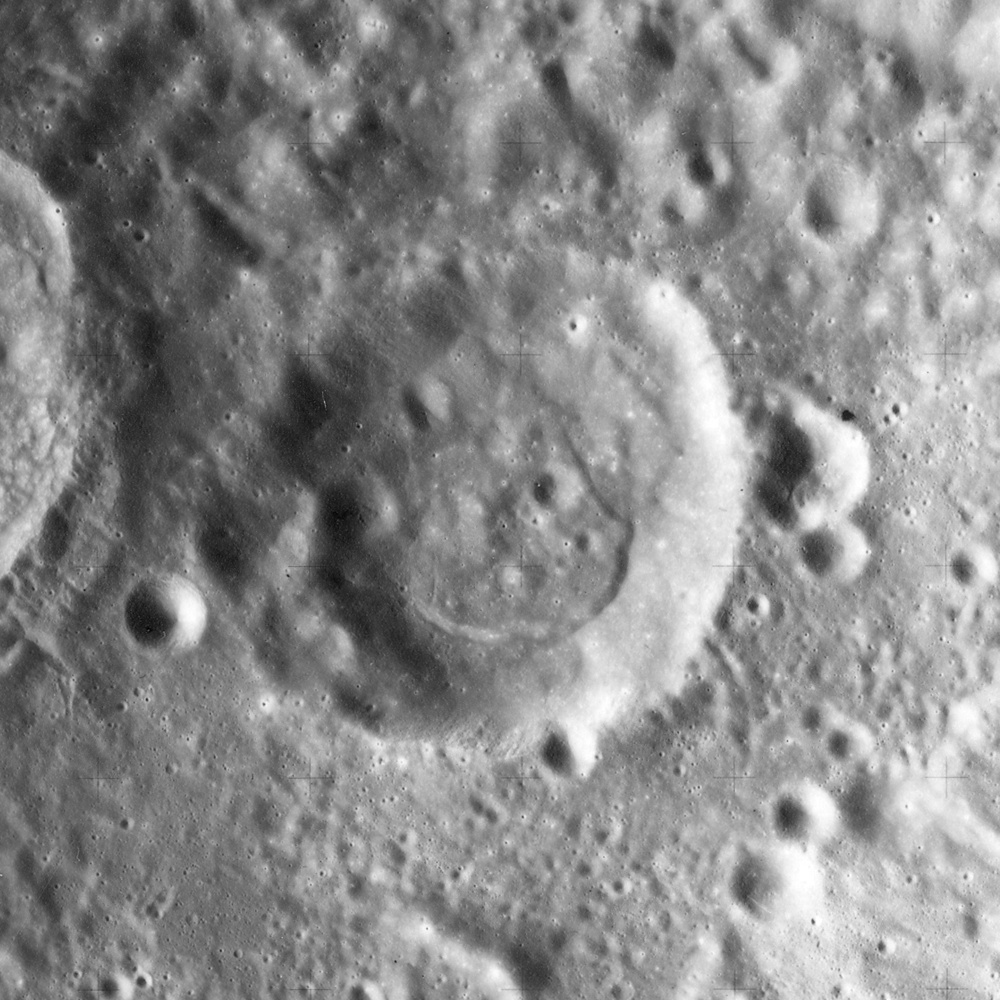
- Apollo 15 Mapping Camera image
- Coordinates: 16.76°S 123.12°E
- Diameter: 38.17 km (23.72 mi)
- Depth: 2.7 km (1.7 mi)
- Colongitude: 237° at sunrise
- Eponym: Fyodor P. Litke

Litke is a lunar impact crater that lies within a large walled plain named Fermi, near the north-northwestern inner rim. Less than one crater diameter to the west-northwest is the slightly larger Delporte. Litke is located on the far side of the Moon and cannot be viewed directly from the Earth.

The rim of Litke is circular to the east and south, but the northern and western rims have been pushed inward somewhat. The west rim is irregular and broken through by a pair of worn depressions. Along the northern side slumped deposits form a pile along the base of the inner wall. A small crater lies along the southern rim and a small crater is attached to the exterior along the eastern side. The most distinguishing feature of the crater is that the interior floor has a low scarp that is nearly concentric with the eastern and southern sides.

The crater was named after Russian geographer Fyodor P. Litke by the IAU in 1970.

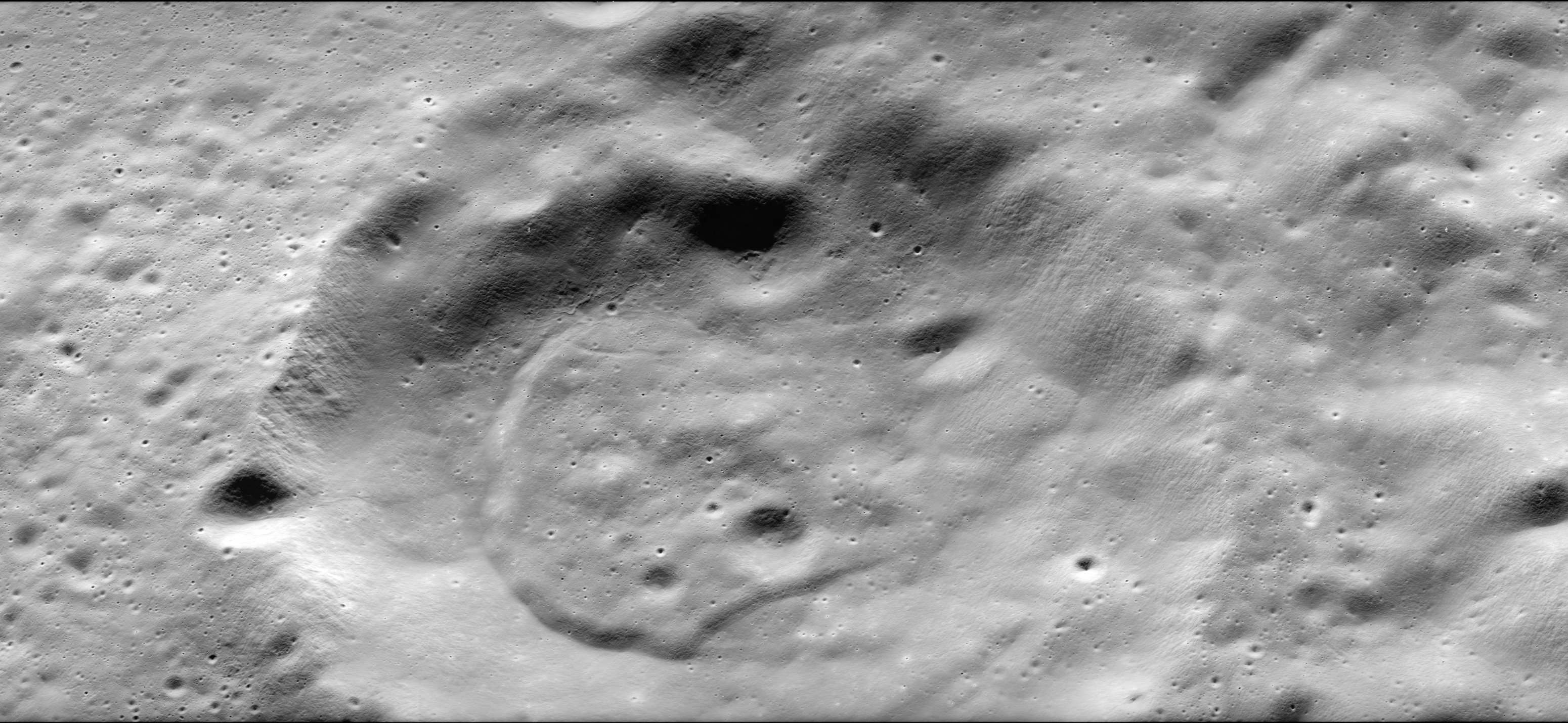
Oblique view from Apollo 15 Panoramic Camera

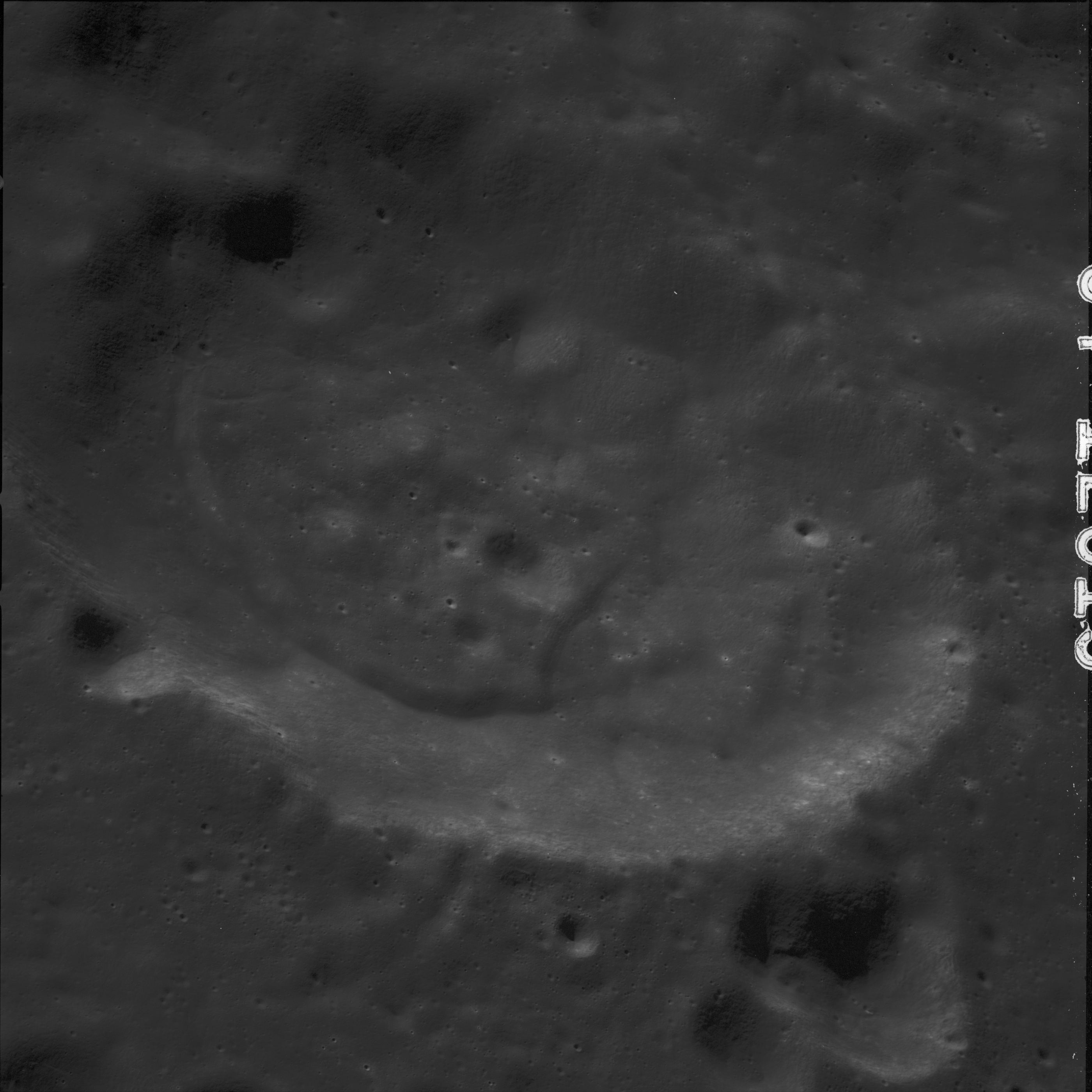
Oblique view from Apollo 15
