= 1543 Bourgeois =

Main-belt asteroid

Discovery
- Discovered by: E. Delporte
- Discovery site: Uccle Observatory
- Discovery date: 21 September 1941

Designations
- Named after: Paul Bourgeois (Belgian astronomer)
- Alternative designations: 1941 SJ · A911 MF
- Minor planet category: main-belt · (middle) background

Orbital characteristics
- Epoch 4 September 2017 (JD 2458000.5)
- Uncertainty parameter 0
- Observation arc: 75.81 yr (27,689 days)
- Aphelion: 3.4854 AU
- Perihelion: 1.7812 AU
- Semi-major axis: 2.6333 AU
- Eccentricity: 0.3236
- Orbital period (sidereal): 4.27 yr (1,561 days)
- Mean anomaly: 307.06°
- Mean motion: 0° 13^{m} 50.52^{s} / day
- Inclination: 11.021°
- Longitude of ascending node: 287.95°
- Argument of perihelion: 25.799°

Physical characteristics
- Dimensions: 11.985±0.673 km 16.73 km (calculated)
- Synodic rotation period: 2.48±0.01 h
- Geometric albedo: 0.1 (assumed); 0.214±0.033
- Spectral type: S/C (assumed)
- Absolute magnitude (H): 11.90 · 12.0 · 12.06±0.18

1543 Bourgeois (provisional designation 1941 SJ) is a stony asteroid from the central asteroid belt's background population, approximately 12 kilometers in diameter. It was discovered on 21 September 1941, by astronomer Eugène Delporte at the Royal Observatory of Belgium in Uccle. The asteroid was named after Belgian astronomer Paul Bourgeois.

== Orbit and classification ==
Bourgeois is a non-family asteroid from the main belt's background population. It orbits the Sun in the central asteroid belt at a distance of 1.8–3.5 AU once every 4 years and 3 months (1,561 days). Its orbit has an eccentricity of 0.32 and an inclination of 11° with respect to the ecliptic.

The asteroid was first identified as A911 MF at Johannesburg Observatory in June 1911. The body's observation arc begins at Istanbul Observatory (080), eight days prior to its official discovery observation at Uccle.

== Physical characteristics ==
No spectral type has been determined. The Lightcurve Data Base considers Bourgeois equally likely to be of a stony or carbonaceous, while albedo measurements by Wide-field Infrared Survey Explorer suggest that it is a stony S-type asteroid (see below).

=== Rotation period ===
In August 2005, a rotational lightcurve of Bourgeois was obtained from photometric observations by French amateur astronomer Laurent Bernasconi. Analysis of the fragmentary lightcurve gave a rotation period of 2.48 hours with a brightness amplitude of 0.03 magnitude (U=1). As of 2017, no secure period has been obtained.

=== Diameter and albedo ===
According to the survey carried out by the NEOWISE mission of NASA's WISE telescope, Bourgeois measures 11.985 kilometers in diameter and its surface has an albedo of 0.214. The Collaborative Asteroid Lightcurve Link assumes an albedo of 0.1 – a compromise albedo between the stony (0.20) and carbonaceous (0.057) types, used as a default for asteroids with a semi-major axis between 2.6 and 2.7 AU – and calculates a diameter of 16.73 kilometers based on an absolute magnitude of 12.0.

== Naming ==
This minor planet was named in memory of Paul Bourgeois (1898–1974), director of the discovering observatory at Uccle, professor at the Free University of Brussels, credited discoverer of asteroid 1547 Nele, author of various publications in astrometry, astrophysics, meridian astronomy and stellar statistics. The official naming citation was published by the Minor Planet Center on 20 February 1976 (M.P.C. 3930).
