= 1722 Goffin =

Main-belt asteroid

Discovery
- Discovered by: E. Delporte
- Discovery site: Uccle Obs.
- Discovery date: 23 February 1938

Designations
- Named after: Edwin Goffin (amateur astronomer)
- Alternative designations: 1938 EG · 1942 DJ; 1950 HK · 1952 SW; 1952 UQ · 1960 WB; 1964 UF · 1964 VD_{1}
- Minor planet category: main-belt · (middle)

Orbital characteristics
- Epoch 4 September 2017 (JD 2458000.5)
- Uncertainty parameter 0
- Observation arc: 79.09 yr (28,889 days)
- Aphelion: 2.6369 AU
- Perihelion: 2.3902 AU
- Semi-major axis: 2.5135 AU
- Eccentricity: 0.0491
- Orbital period (sidereal): 3.99 yr (1,456 days)
- Mean anomaly: 42.038°
- Mean motion: 0° 14^{m} 50.28^{s} / day
- Inclination: 5.4668°
- Longitude of ascending node: 168.12°
- Argument of perihelion: 283.20°

Physical characteristics
- Dimensions: 10.290±0.118; 10.44 km (taken); 10.442 km 10.446±0.130 km
- Synodic rotation period: 28.8±1.0 h (Note: Pravec (1984) web: rotation period 28.8±1.0 hours with a brightness amplitude of 0.6 mag. Quality code is not available. Summary figures at Collaborative Asteroid Lightcurve Link (CALL) for (1722) Goffin and Pravec, P.; Wolf, M.; Sarounova, L. (1984)); 31 h
- Geometric albedo: 0.2175; 0.2191±0.0165; 0.224±0.041
- Spectral type: S(est.) · S B–V = 0.890
- Absolute magnitude (H): 12.18 · 12.30 · 12.34

1722 Goffin, provisional designation 1938 EG, is a stony asteroid from the central region of the asteroid belt, approximately 10.3 kilometers in diameter.

It was discovered on 23 February 1938, by Belgian astronomer Eugène Delporte at the Royal Observatory of Belgium in Uccle, Belgium. It was later named after Belgian amateur astronomer Edwin Goffin, following a suggestion by Jean Meeus.

== Orbit and classification ==
Minor planet 1722 Goffin orbits the Sun at a distance of 2.4–2.6 AU once every 3 years and 12 months (1,456 days). Its orbit has an eccentricity of 0.05 and an inclination of 5° with respect to the ecliptic. The body's observation arc begins 6 days after its official discovery observation.

== Physical characteristics ==
It is an assumed S-type asteroid, one of the most common spectral types. American astronomer Sherry Fieber-Beyer at NASA Infrared Telescope Facility obtained VNIR spectra on July 20, 2011. The resulting spectrum analysis showed an S-IV assemblage with a derived L-chondrite mineralogy.

=== Lightcurves ===
(1722)'s first rotational lightcurve was obtained by American astronomer Richard P. Binzel at UT Austin in October 1984. It gave a rotation period of 31 hours and an brightness variation of 0.63 magnitude (U=2), while Czech astronomers Petr Pravec and Adrián Galád at Ondřejov Observatory derived a period of 28.8 hours with and amplitude of 0.6 magnitude using Binzel's photometric observations (U=n.a.).

=== Diameter and albedo ===
According to the survey carried out by NASA's Wide-field Infrared Survey Explorer with its subsequent NEOWISE mission, Goffin measures 10.29 kilometers in diameter and its surface has an albedo of 0.224 (using the 2014-published revised near-infrared albedo fits), superseding a preliminary published diameter of 10.446 kilometers. The Collaborative Asteroid Lightcurve Link takes Petr Pravec's 2012-revised WISE data, that gave an albedo of 0.2175 and a diameter of 10.442 kilometers.

== Naming ==
This minor planet was named in honor of the Belgian amateur astronomer Edwin Goffin (born 1950), who has made extensive computations involving minor-planet orbits, and whose initials are indicated by the body's provisional designation, 1938 EG. The official naming citation was published by the Minor Planet Center on 8 April 1982 (M.P.C. 6832).
