= Eugène Joseph Delporte =

Belgian astronomer

Minor planets discovered: 66
see § List of discovered minor planets

Eugène Joseph Delporte (10 January 1882 – 19 October 1955) was a Belgian astronomer born in Belgium in Genappe.

He discovered a total of sixty-six asteroids. Notable discoveries include asteroid 1221 Amor (which gave its name to the category of Amor asteroids) and the Apollo asteroid 2101 Adonis. He discovered or co-discovered some comets as well, including periodic comet 57P/du Toit-Neujmin-Delporte. He worked in the Observatoire Royal de Belgique (Belgian Royal Observatory), situated in the town of Uccle (after which the asteroid 1276 Ucclia is named). He started there in 1903 after receiving his doctorate that year from the Free University of Brussels.

In 1930 he published, on behalf of the International Astronomical Union, a work delineating the modern boundaries between all of the 88 official constellations in the sky, along lines of constant right ascension and declination for the epoch B1875.0.

The Florian asteroid 1274 Delportia (discovered by himself) and the lunar impact crater Delporte were named after him.

== List of discovered minor planets ==
1052 Belgica	15 November 1925
1068 Nofretete	13 September 1926
1122 Neith	17 September 1928
1124 Stroobantia	6 October 1928
1128 Astrid	10 March 1929
1145 Robelmonte	3 February 1929
1168 Brandia	25 August 1930
1170 Siva	29 September 1930
1176 Lucidor	15 November 1930
1199 Geldonia	14 September 1931
1217 Maximiliana	13 March 1932
1221 Amor	12 March 1932
1222 Tina	11 June 1932
1239 Queteleta	4 February 1932
1261 Legia	23 March 1933
1274 Delportia	28 November 1932
1276 Ucclia	24 January 1933
1280 Baillauda	18 August 1933
1285 Julietta	21 August 1933
1288 Santa	26 August 1933
1290 Albertine	21 August 1933
1291 Phryne	15 September 1933
1293 Sonja	26 September 1933
1294 Antwerpia	24 October 1933
1329 Eliane	23 March 1933

1341 Edmée	27 January 1935
1350 Rosselia	3 October 1934
1361 Leuschneria	30 August 1935
1363 Herberta	30 August 1935
1366 Piccolo	29 November 1932
1374 Isora	21 October 1935
1375 Alfreda	22 October 1935
1388 Aphrodite	24 September 1935
1401 Lavonne	22 October 1935
1433 Geramtina	30 October 1937
1476 Cox	10 September 1936
1486 Marilyn	23 August 1938
1491 Balduinus	23 February 1938
1493 Sigrid	26 August 1938
1543 Bourgeois	21 September 1941
1560 Strattonia	3 December 1942
1664 Felix	4 February 1929
1672 Gezelle	29 January 1935
1698 Christophe	10 February 1934
1707 Chantal	8 September 1932
1711 Sandrine	29 January 1935
1722 Goffin	23 February 1938
1724 Vladimir	28 February 1932
1754 Cunningham	29 March 1935
1848 Delvaux	18 August 1933

1878 Hughes	18 August 1933
1926 Demiddelaer	2 May 1935
2101 Adonis	12 February 1936
2213 Meeus	24 September 1935
2276 Warck	18 August 1933
2331 Parvulesco	12 March 1936
2534 Houzeau	2 November 1931
2545 Verbiest	26 January 1933
2713 Luxembourg	19 February 1938
2819 Ensor	20 October 1933
2913 Horta	12 October 1931
3534 Sax	15 December 1936
3567 Alvema	15 November 1930
3605 Davy	28 November 1932
6354 Vangelis	3 April 1934
7043 Godart	2 September 1934
