= 399 Persephone =

Main-belt asteroid

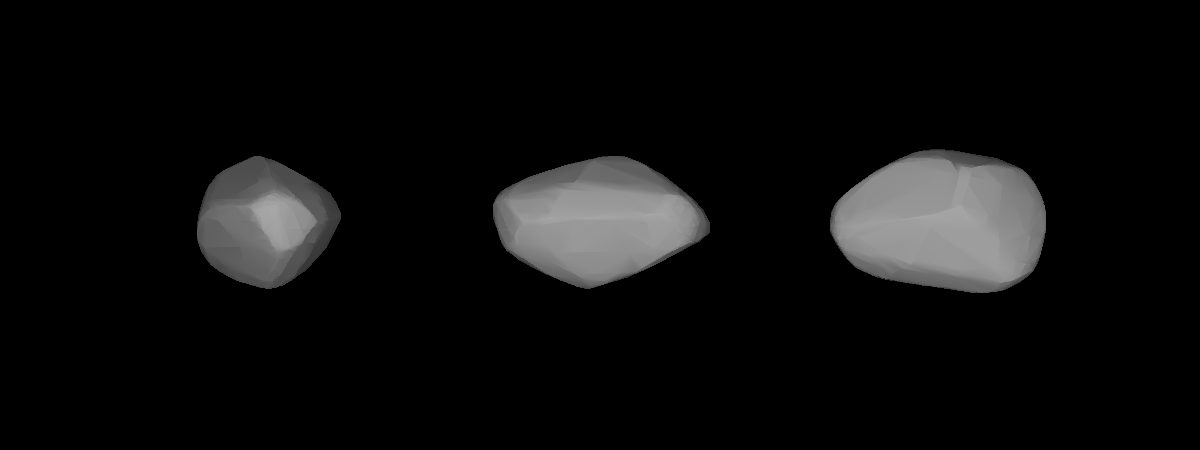
- A three-dimensional model of 399 Persephone based on its light curve

Discovery
- Discovered by: Max Wolf
- Discovery date: 23 February 1895

Designations
- Pronunciation: /pərˈsɛfəniː/
- Named after: Persephone
- Alternative designations: 1895 BP
- Minor planet category: Main belt

Orbital characteristics
- Epoch 31 July 2016 (JD 2457600.5)
- Uncertainty parameter 0
- Observation arc: 120.99 yr (44191 d)
- Aphelion: 3.2761 AU (490.10 Gm)
- Perihelion: 2.82735 AU (422.966 Gm)
- Semi-major axis: 3.0517 AU (456.53 Gm)
- Eccentricity: 0.073517
- Orbital period (sidereal): 5.33 yr (1947.2 d)
- Mean anomaly: 255.116°
- Mean motion: 0° 11^{m} 5.568^{s} / day
- Inclination: 13.113°
- Longitude of ascending node: 346.391°
- Argument of perihelion: 194.023°

Physical characteristics
- Dimensions: 49.13±4.0 km
- Synodic rotation period: 9.136 h (0.3807 d)
- Geometric albedo: 0.1838±0.034
- Absolute magnitude (H): 9.0, 8.91

399 Persephone is a main belt asteroid. It was discovered by German astronomer Max Wolf on 23 February 1895 in Heidelberg.
