= 1276 Ucclia =

Main-belt asteroid

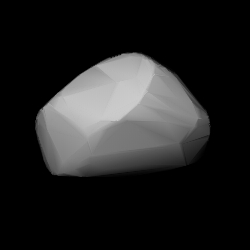
- Modelled shape of Ucclia from its lightcurve

Discovery
- Discovered by: E. Delporte
- Discovery site: Uccle Obs.
- Discovery date: 24 January 1933

Designations
- Named after: Uccle (city and observatory)
- Alternative designations: 1933 BA · 1963 KF
- Minor planet category: main-belt · (outer); Alauda

Orbital characteristics
- Epoch 16 February 2017 (JD 2457800.5)
- Uncertainty parameter 0
- Observation arc: 83.79 yr (30,604 days)
- Aphelion: 3.4772 AU
- Perihelion: 2.8781 AU
- Semi-major axis: 3.1776 AU
- Eccentricity: 0.0943
- Orbital period (sidereal): 5.66 yr (2,069 days)
- Mean anomaly: 351.04°
- Mean motion: 0° 10^{m} 26.4^{s} / day
- Inclination: 23.274°
- Longitude of ascending node: 114.46°
- Argument of perihelion: 333.68°

Physical characteristics
- Mean diameter: 30.09±0.51 km 30.34 km (derived); 30.63±2.1 km (IRAS:8); 33.50±0.79 km 36.499±0.240; 40.010±0.505 km
- Synodic rotation period: 4.9 h 4.9073±0.0004 h 4.90748±0.00005 h 4.90768±0.00002 h
- Geometric albedo: 0.0528±0.0076; 0.075±0.009; 0.0837 (derived); 0.1303±0.019 (IRAS:8); 0.141±0.006
- Spectral type: C
- Absolute magnitude (H): 10.40 · 10.8 · 10.9 · 10.92±0.30

1276 Ucclia (prov. designation: 1933 BA) is a carbonaceous Alauda asteroid from the outer region of the asteroid belt, approximately 31 kilometers (19 miles) in diameter. It was discovered on 24 January 1933 by Belgian astronomer Eugène Delporte at the Royal Observatory of Belgium in Uccle. Two nights later, the body was independently discovered by Richard Schorr at Bergedorf Observatory in Hamburg, Germany. It was named for the Belgium city of Uccle and its discovering observatory.

== Orbit and classification ==
Ucclia is a member of the Alauda family (902), a large family of typically bright carbonaceous asteroids named after its parent body, 702 Alauda. It orbits the Sun in the outer main-belt at a distance of 2.9–3.5 AU once every 5 years and 8 months (2,069 days). Its orbit has an eccentricity of 0.09 and an inclination of 23° with respect to the ecliptic. No precoveries were taken prior to its discovery.

== Naming ==
This minor planet was named after Uccle, in honor of both, the city and the discovering observatory (H 117).

== Physical characteristics ==
=== Rotation period ===
A rotational lightcurve of Ucclia was obtained from photometric observations by Italian and French astronomers Silvano Casulli, Federico Manzini and Pierre Antonini in March 2007. It showed a well-defined rotation period of 4.90768 hours with a brightness variation of 0.40 in magnitude (U=3). In June 2008, a second light-curve by Slovak astronomer Adrián Galád at Modra Observatory, gave a concurring period of 4.9073 hours with an amplitude of 0.29 in magnitude (U=3-).

=== Diameter and albedo ===
According to the surveys carried out by the Infrared Astronomical Satellite IRAS, the Japanese Akari satellite, and NASA's Wide-field Infrared Survey Explorer with its subsequent NEOWISE mission, Ucclia measures between 30.1 and 40.0 kilometers in diameter and its surface has an albedo between 0.05 and 0.14. The Collaborative Asteroid Lightcurve Link derives an albedo of 0.08 and a diameter of 30.3 kilometers.
