= Delporte (crater) =

Crater on the Moon

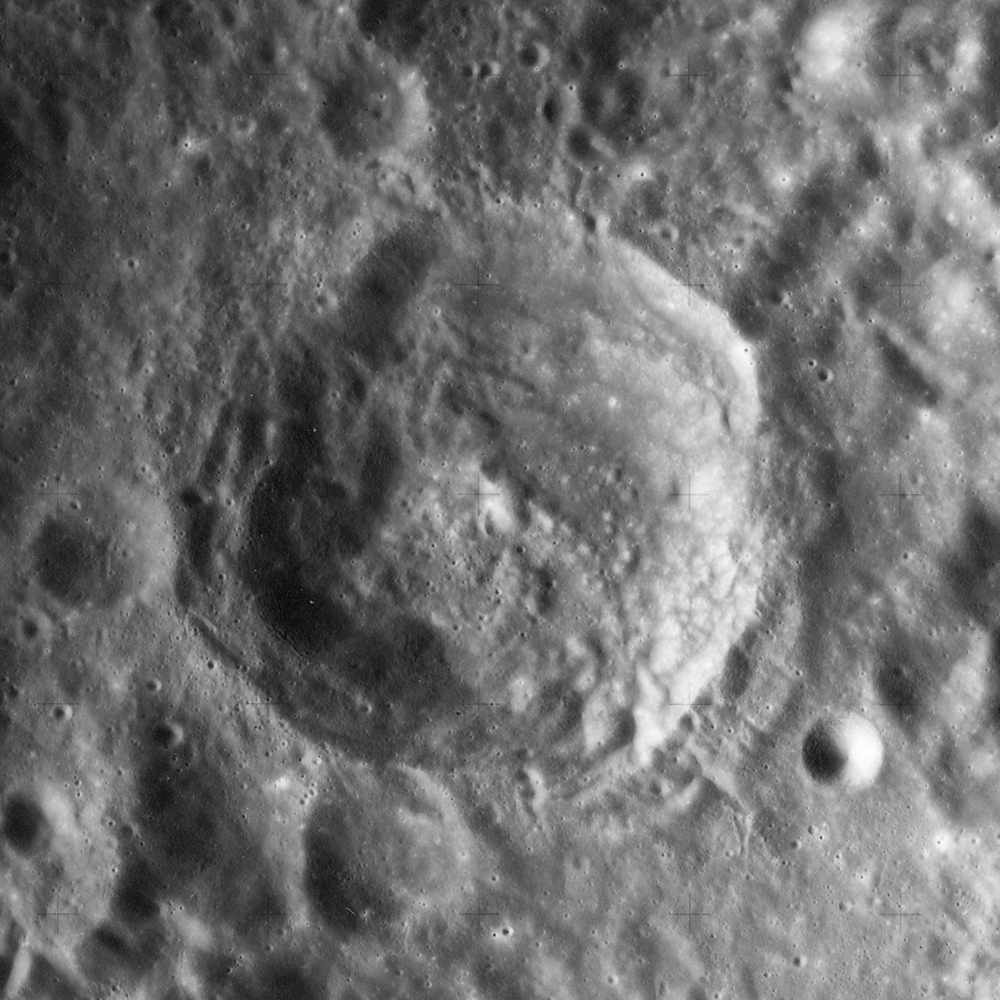
- Crater Delporte as seen by the mapping camera of Apollo 15
- Coordinates: 15.89°S 121.55°E
- Diameter: 42.5 km (26.4 mi)
- Depth: 4.0 km (2.5 mi)
- Colongitude: 240° at sunrise
- Eponym: Eugène Delporte

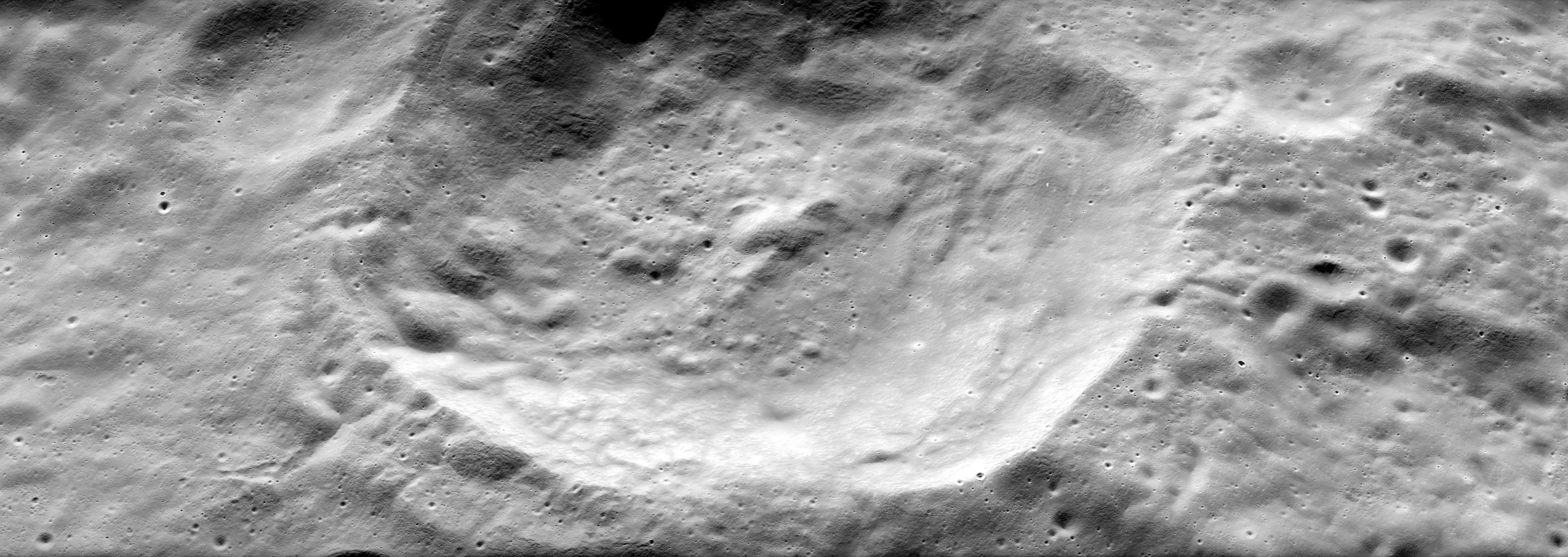
Oblique view from Apollo 17 Panoramic Camera

Delporte is a lunar impact crater on the far side of the Moon. It overlies part of the northwestern rim of the huge walled plain called Fermi, and the crater Litke is nearly attached to the southeastern rim.

On the lunar geologic timescale, this formation dates to the Late Imbrian period. The rim of this crater is only marginally worn, although it is not quite circular and the edge is somewhat uneven. There is a shelf running along the northern inner wall. At the midpoint is a central ridge that extends to the northward.

The crater is named after Belgian astronomer Eugène Joseph Delporte (1882-1955). Its designation was formally adopted by the International Astronomical Union in 1970.

== See also ==
- 1274 Delportia, minor planet
