= Royal Observatory of Belgium =

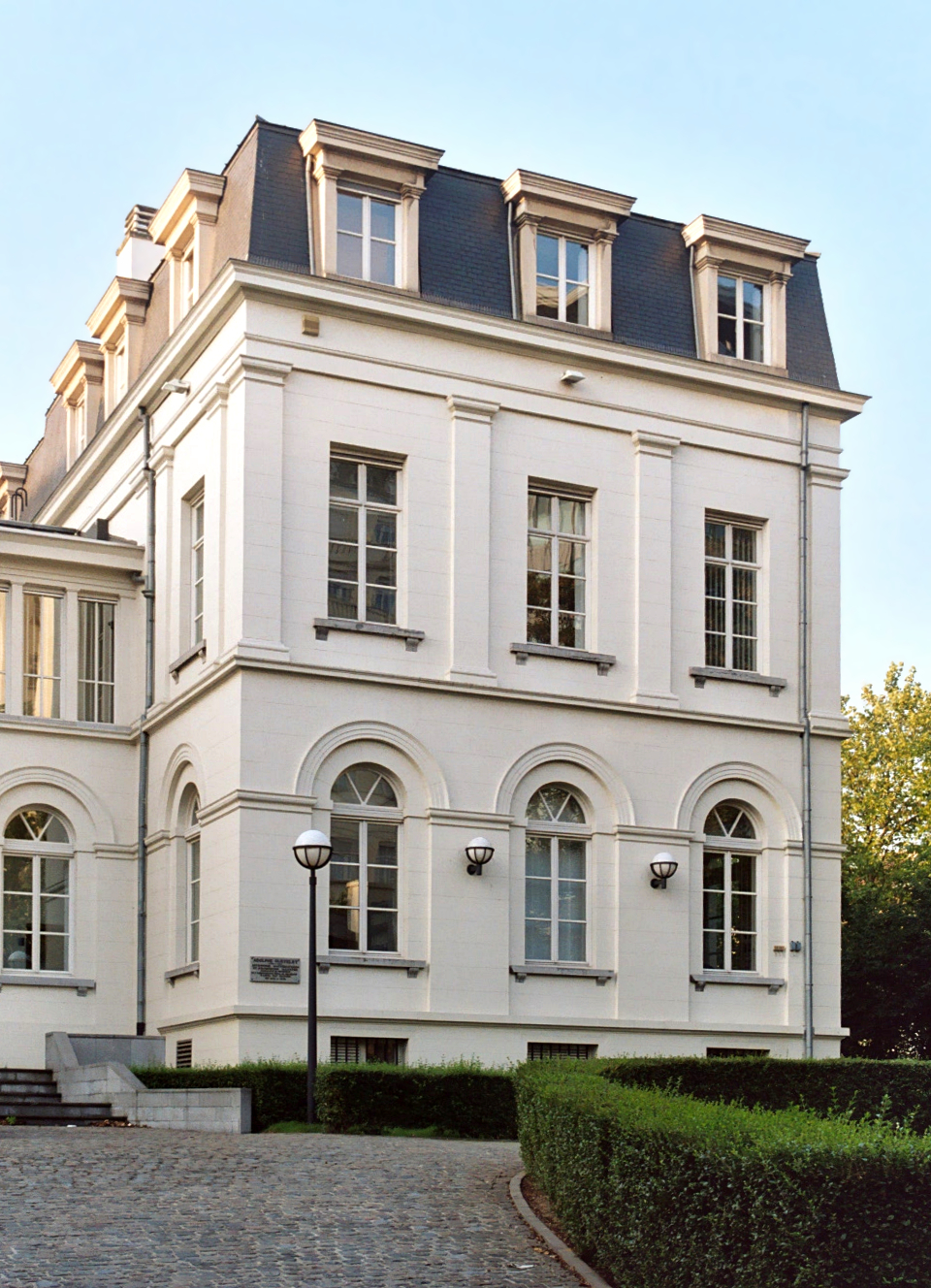

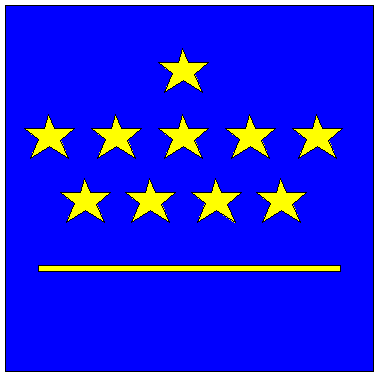
- Observatory code: 012
- Location: Uccle, Arrondissement of Brussels-Capital, Brussels, Belgium
- Coordinates: 50°47′53″N 4°21′31″E
- Established: 1826 (Saint-Josse-ten-Noode); 1890 Uccle
- Website: www.orb.be www.ksb.be
- Telescopes: Humain Radioastronomy Station; SWAP
- Location of Royal Observatory of Belgium
- Related media on Commons

Minor planets discovered: 13
see § List of discovered minor planets

The Royal Observatory of Belgium (Dutch: Koninklijke Sterrenwacht van België; French: Observatoire royal de Belgique; German: Königliche Sternwarte von Belgien) has been situated in the Uccle municipality of Brussels since 1890. It is part of the institutions of the Belgian Federal Science Policy Office (BELSPO).

The Royal Observatory was first established in Saint-Josse-ten-Noode in 1826 by King William I of the Netherlands under the impulse of the astronomer and mathematician Adolphe Quetelet. It was home to a 100 cm (39 in) diameter aperture Zeiss reflector in the first half of the 20th century, one of the largest telescopes in the world at the time. It now owns a variety of other astronomical instruments, such as astrographs, as well as a range of seismograph equipment. Its main activities are reference systems and geodynamics, astrometry and dynamics of celestial bodies, astrophysics, and Solar physics.

The asteroid 1276 Ucclia is named in honour of the city and the observatory and 16908 Groeselenberg is named for the hill the observatory is located on.

== History ==
=== 19th century ===
Adolphe Quetelet first petitioned the government of the United Kingdom of the Netherlands to establish an astronomical observatory in Brussels in 1823. King William I granted his request in 1826 and construction started in 1827 in Saint-Josse-ten-Noode. Meteorological observations started early, but delivery and installation of astronomical equipment proceeded slowly. Quetelet was appointed astronomer in 1828.

During the Belgian Revolution, fighting took place in and around the observatory. Quetelet kept his position under the new government and started scientific observations. By 1834, buildings and instruments were finally completed. Adolpe Quetelet was succeeded by his son Ernest upon his death in 1874.

In 1876, Jean-Charles Houzeau became the new director. He called on François van Rysselberghe to attach him to the weather forecast service the same year. On 26 September 1876, the Observatory published the first Meteorological Bulletin in its history. Immediately after he became director, Houzeau started planning a move to Uccle. He managed to obtain better funding, enlarged the scientific staff and completely renewed the instruments. The first Belgian astronomical expedition was sent to Santiago and San Antonio to observe the transit of Venus in 1882. He tried to separate the meteorological and astronomical departments, but this was refused by the government. In 1883 construction of a new observatory in Uccle started, but Houzeau's resignation in 1883 delayed the move which was only completed in 1890–1891.

=== 20th century ===
Georges Lecointe was appointed as director in 1900, succeeding F. Folie and A. Lancaster. Under his leadership, seismological measurements (for detecting earthquakes) started in 1901 and the first weather balloons were launched in 1906. Belgium participated in the Carte du Ciel and the Astrographic Catalogue; observations lasted until 1964. In 1913 the meteorological department finally became an independent entity, the Royal Meteorological Institute. After World War I the Central Bureau for Astronomical Telegrams was located in Uccle from 1920 to 1922 while it was headed by Lecointe.

Illness forced Lecointe to resign in 1925 and he was succeeded by Paul Stroobant.

Since 1981, the Sunspot Index Data center, the World data center for the Sunspot Index is harbored at the observatory.

The Brussels Planetarium is located on the Heysel/Heizel Plateau in Laeken (northern part of the City of Brussels).

King Baudouin was an amateur astronomer and took a keen interest in the Royal Observatory. After his death, a statue in his honour was raised outside the entrance.

== Instruments ==
Examples only

In 1914:

- 38 cm (15-inch) Cooke-Merz refractor
- 15 cm (6-inch) Cooke-Steinhell refractor
- 15 cm (6-inch) Repsold refractor with micrometer
- Carte du Ciel astrograph

As of 1981:

- Askania Meridian circle (19 cm)
- Danjon Astrolabe
- 45-cm aperture Cooke-Zeiss refractor on equatorial mount
- 38-cm aperture refractor
- Triple refractor (By Zeiss)
- 25, 10, and 15 cm aperture refractors (these are telescopes with a lens)
- 20 cm Zeiss Double Astrograph

The Observatory also had a 100 cm aperture Zeiss reflector.

== List of discovered minor planets ==
important; height: 175px;
(120140) 2003 GB_{21}	3 April 2003	list
(172419) 2003 GD_{21}	4 April 2003	list
(174625) 2003 ST_{76}	19 September 2003	list
(175069) 2004 GU_{28}	15 April 2004	list
(182910) 2002 EP_{99}	2 March 2002	list
(186664) 2003 YA_{30}	18 December 2003	list
(206440) 2003 SC_{210}	25 September 2003	list

important; height: 175px;
(217332) 2004 RS_{79}	8 September 2004	list
(247727) 2003 GC_{21}	4 April 2003	list
(260089) 2004 KO_{17}	27 May 2004	list
(271133) 2003 SU_{76}	19 September 2003	list
(323074) 2002 TS_{96}	10 October 2002	list
(436000) 2009 FE_{46}	17 March 2009	list
Minor Planet Center as of 2016

== See also ==
- Belgian Federal Science Policy Office
- Belgian Institute for Space Aeronomy
- List of astronomical observatories
- List of minor planet discoverers § Discovering dedicated institutions
- Planetarium
- Royal Meteorological Institute
