= List of named minor planets: S =

This is a partial list of named minor planets, containing all those starting with the letter S, as of 9 November 2026. It is ordered in a case-insensitive, alphabetical manner and contains a total of 2,475 entries. Grey minor planets have no article and redirect to the list of minor planets instead (see List of minor planets § Main index).

== S ==
- 207717 Sa'a
- 130089 Saadatanwar
- 34591 Saadhahmed
- 5409 Saale
- 745492 Saanich
- 4163 Saaremaa
- 6099 Saarland
- 145456 Sab
- 13260 Sabadell
- 1115 Sabauda
- 15329 Sabena
- 209374 Sabil
- 28887 Sabina
- 118194 Sabinagarroni
- 665 Sabine
- 33346 Sabinedevieilhe
- 6591 Sabinin
- 53053 Sabinomaffeo
- 545564 Sabonis
- 2264 Sabrina
- 4160 Sabrina-John
- 29634 Sabrinaaksil
- 48461 Sabrinamaricia
- 22752 Sabrinamasiero
- 117350 Saburo
- 2822 Sacajawea
- 34182 Sachan
- 26501 Sachiko
- 34142 Sachinkonan
- 18360 Sachs
- 5866 Sachsen
- 520585 Saci
- 7690 Sackler
- 14541 Sacrobosco
- 113671 Sacromonte
- 8704 Sadakane
- 7616 Sadako
- 100266 Sadamisaki
- 7205 Sadanori
- 45878 Sadaoaoki
- 48624 Sadayuki
- 157194 Saddlemyer
- 12572 Sadegh
- 1626 Sadeya
- 32051 Sadhikamalladi
- 34264 Sadhuka
- 118230 Sado
- 7075 Sadovnichij
- 18702 Sadowski
- 30533 Saeidzoonemat
- 6250 Saekohayashi
- 52226 Saenredam
- 4162 SAF
- 115051 Safaeinili
- 1364 Safara
- 8336 Šafařík
- 68718 Safi
- 209107 Šafránek
- 3615 Safronov
- 1163 Saga
- 7435 Sagamihara
- 218679 Sagamorehill
- 2709 Sagan
- 9893 Sagano
- 21405 Sagarmehta
- 28505 Sagarrambhia
- 20242 Sagot
- 20066 Sagov
- 159814 Saguaro
- 2605 Sahade
- 134369 Sahara
- 4606 Saheki
- 31946 Sahilabbi
- 2088 Sahlia
- 28719 Sahoolahan
- 333036 Sahr
- 107805 Saibi
- 6970 Saigusa
- 6408 Saijo
- 8011 Saijokeiichi
- 23543 Saiki
- 20650 Saillenfest
- 1533 Saimaa
- 9395 Saint Michel
- 5995 Saint-Aignan
- 2578 Saint-Exupéry
- 284945 Saint-Imier
- 10703 Saint-Jacques
- 6898 Saint-Marys
- 5210 Saint-Saëns
- 86048 Saint-Tropez
- 48159 Saint-Véran
- 17431 Sainte-Colombe
- 400162 SAIT
- 5618 Saitama
- 2615 Saito
- 52382 Saitoizumi
- 8738 Saji
- 31151 Sajichugaku
- 14543 Sajigawasuiseki
- 114659 Sajnovics
- 8115 Sakabe
- 22885 Sakaemura
- 8882 Sakaetamura
- 10823 Sakaguchi
- 26829 Sakaihoikuen
- 3995 Sakaino
- 14487 Sakaisakae
- 9851 Sakamoto
- 14006 Sakamotofumio
- 5862 Sakanoue
- 91395 Sakanouenokumo
- 19161 Sakawa
- 85388 Sakazukiyama
- 152337 Sakeenaburson
- 17101 Sakenova
- 1979 Sakharov
- 34106 Sakhrani
- 3983 Sakiko
- 6071 Sakitama
- 10142 Sakka
- 31875 Saksena
- 64547 Saku
- 6809 Sakuma
- 1166 Sakuntala
- 11280 Sakurai
- 10516 Sakurajima
- 35062 Sakuranosyou
- 16650 Sakushingakuin
- 120347 Salacia
- 12780 Salamony
- 4193 Salanave
- 5546 Salavat
- 2918 Salazar
- 1456 Saldanha
- 28572 Salebreton
- 20171 Salerno
- 20687 Saletore
- 27094 Salgari
- 78125 Salimbeni
- 8648 Salix
- 7221 Sallaba
- 1715 Salli
- 333029 Sallitt
- 31471 Sallyalbright
- 26243 Sallyfenska
- 232868 Salmasylla
- 29700 Salmon
- 278591 Salò
- 562 Salome
- 1436 Salonta
- 22456 Salopek
- 7603 Salopia
- 11757 Salpeter
- 11315 Salpêtrière
- 15150 Salsa
- 36614 Saltis
- 3044 Saltykov
- 33406 Saltzman
- 333553 Salvador
- 12789 Salvadoraguirre
- 689210 Salvadorjribas
- 588905 Salvadornogueira
- 23318 Salvadorsanchez
- 1083 Salvia
- 29672 Salvo
- 6442 Salzburg
- 22146 Samaan
- 19550 Samabates
- 34628 Samaboyea
- 12472 Samadhi
- 23798 Samagonzalez
- 26660 Samahalpern
- 3147 Samantha
- 42910 Samanthalawler
- 27454 Samapaige
- 26922 Samara
- 12871 Samarasinha
- 26656 Samarenae
- 30939 Samaritaine
- 210271 Samarkand
- 28433 Samarquez
- 21736 Samaschneid
- 4016 Sambre
- 4784 Samcarin
- 9126 Samcoulson
- 15006 Samcristoforetti
- 20591 Sameergupta
- 30273 Samepstein
- 33565 Samferguson
- 16211 Samirsur
- 2624 Samitchell
- 15384 Samková
- 8461 Sammiepung
- 20969 Samo
- 262418 Samofalov
- 10262 Samoilov
- 34079 Samoylova
- 13337 Sampath
- 2091 Sampo
- 9881 Sampson
- 12577 Samra
- 9180 Samsagan
- 562008 Samtackeff
- 13667 Samthurman
- 113237 Samucavicchioli
- 41001 Samuel
- 11622 Samuele
- 20656 Samuelgrant
- 343774 Samuelhale
- 17971 Samuelhowell
- 32623 Samuelkahn
- 30226 Samuelleejackson
- 34788 Samuellossef
- 177065 Samuelnoah
- 29773 Samuelpritt
- 38639 Samuels
- 11686 Samuelweissman
- 10718 Samusʹ
- 4048 Samwestfall
- 18335 San Cassiano
- 3043 San Diego
- 6216 San Jose
- 2284 San Juan
- 7481 San Marcello
- 2745 San Martín
- 18745 San Pedro
- 20786 San Sebastián
- 25089 Sanabria-Rivera
- 221230 Sanaloria
- 24523 Sanaraoof
- 32080 Sanashareef
- 26012 Sanborn
- 14613 Sanchez
- 20685 Sánchez-Cano
- 25091 Sanchez-Claudio
- 9963 Sandage
- 15552 Sandashounkan
- 105211 Sanden
- 3029 Sanders
- 6893 Sanderson
- 20126 Sandfordasher
- 4006 Sandler
- 1760 Sandra
- 20537 Sandraderosa
- 761081 Sandraeglīte
- 28680 Sandralitvin
- 114612 Sandrasavaglio
- 29549 Sandrasbaragli
- 1711 Sandrine
- 11337 Sandro
- 336203 Sandrobuss
- [[:{{{2}}}|{{{2}}}]]
- 241136 Sandstede
- 83362 Sandukruit
- 9403 Sanduleak
- 8597 Sandvicensis
- 129073 Sandyfreund
- 32943 Sandyryan
- 5685 Sanenobufukui
- 5736 Sanford
- 129898 Sanfordselznick
- 28426 Sangani
- 9819 Sangerhausen
- 32439 Sangjoonkim
- 5081 Sanguin
- 673736 Sanhueza
- 84119 Sanitariitaliani
- 183286 Sanjaklajić
- 29783 Sanjanarane
- 33762 Sanjayseshan
- 24940 Sankichiyama
- 216888 Sankovich
- 30779 Sankt-Stephan
- 6667 Sannaimura
- 38203 Sanner
- 8660 Sano
- 16847 Sanpoloamosciano
- 10691 Sans
- 9013 Sansaturio
- 21337 Sansepolcro
- 3509 Sanshui
- 37222 Sansom
- 4212 Sansyu-Asuke
- 1288 Santa
- 21287 Santa-Lucia
- 22161 Santagata
- 28105 Santallo
- 2620 Santana
- 10472 Santana-Ros
- 6969 Santaro
- 20832 Santhikodali
- 11335 Santiago
- 20695 Santiagoiglesias
- 33191 Santiagostone
- 4158 Santini
- 37699 Santini-Aichl
- 58466 Santoka
- 80984 Santomurakami
- 19034 Santorini
- 9288 Santos-Sanz
- 17043 Santucci
- 7794 Sanvito
- 216319 Sanxia
- 5537 Sanya
- 29160 São Paulo
- 152583 Saône
- 487884 Saoras
- 22177 Saotome
- 28107 Sapar
- 143641 Sapello
- 275 Sapientia
- 80 Sappho
- 24125 Sapphozoe
- 34192 Sappington
- 3473 Sapporo
- 533 Sara
- 2987 Sarabhai
- 5459 Saraburger
- 20355 Saraclark
- 152226 Saracole
- 29895 Sarafaggi
- 6800 Saragamine
- 34589 Sarahadamo
- 56011 Sarahantier
- 121469 Sarahaugh
- 18768 Sarahbates
- 18954 Sarahbounds
- 34632 Sarahbroas
- 275106 Sarahdubeyjames
- 20700 Saraheanderson
- 159102 Sarahflanigan
- 298762 Sarahgallagher
- 31495 Sarahgalvin
- 34237 Sarahgao
- 19584 Sarahgerin
- 30535 Sarahgreenstreet
- 18855 Sarahgutman
- 161592 Sarahhamilton
- 3065 Sarahill
- 32022 Sarahjenkins
- 121486 Sarahkirby
- 34178 Sarahmarie
- 22944 Sarahmarzen
- 13403 Sarahmousa
- 133432 Sarahnoble
- 23045 Sarahocken
- 21927 Sarahpierz
- 22544 Sarahrapo
- 28770 Sarahrines
- 129318 Sarahschlieder
- 17094 Sarahsyed
- 197449 Sarahwinfrey
- 29982 Sarahwu
- 10485 Sarahyeomans
- 178267 Sarajevo
- 33714 Sarakaufman
- 23074 Sarakirsch
- 133782 Saraknutson
- 65091 Saramagrin
- 29681 Saramanshad
- 33603 Saramason
- 26851 Sarapul
- 5497 Sararussell
- 30057 Sarasakowitz
- 333545 Sarasanders
- 3026 Sarastro
- 28450 Saravolz
- 450737 Sarbievius
- 231609 Sarcander
- 53252 Sardegna
- 336204 Sardinas
- 1012 Sarema
- 11758 Sargent
- 18939 Sariancel
- 19652 Saris
- 796 Sarita
- 25630 Sarkar
- 27456 Sarkisian
- 12190 Sarkisov
- 1920 Sarmiento
- 10258 Sárneczky
- 5647 Sarojininaidu
- 5059 Saroma
- 8557 Šaroun
- 9168 Sarov
- 2223 Sarpedon
- 8335 Sarton
- 11384 Sartre
- 10499 Sarty
- 23773 Sarugaku
- 418532 Saruman
- 10768 Sarutahiko
- 9198 Sasagamine
- 10092 Sasaki
- 16035 Sasandford
- 580311 Saselemér
- 3680 Sasha
- 6169 Sashakrot
- 461 Saskia
- 601036 Sassflóra
- 7500 Sassi
- 8194 Satake
- 108097 Satcher
- 9179 Satchmo
- 3292 Sather
- 33621 Sathish
- 9438 Satie
- 15946 Satinský
- 15672 Sato-Norio
- 36424 Satokokumasaki
- 34088 Satokosuka
- 8668 Satomimura
- 8485 Satoru
- 14927 Satoshi
- 12738 Satoshimiki
- 14499 Satotoshio
- 212929 Satovski
- 15335 Satoyukie
- 2402 Satpaev
- 308197 Satrapi
- 274213 Satriani
- 5300 Sats
- 7219 Satterwhite
- 99201 Sattler
- 15533 Saturnino
- 246821 Satyarthi
- 3598 Saucier
- 9248 Sauer
- 13086 Sauerbruch
- 10659 Sauerland
- 177770 Saulanwu
- 428694 Saulė
- 231265 Saulperlmutter
- 31510 Saumya
- 7336 Saunders
- 20213 Saurabhsharan
- 69977 Saurodonati
- 378214 Sauron
- 3820 Sauval
- 29837 Savage
- 10907 Savalle
- 29862 Savannahjoy
- 121331 Savannahsalazar
- 25813 Savannahshaw
- 13488 Savanov
- 64974 Savaria
- 14291 Savereide
- 21160 Saveriolombardi
- 278447 Saviano
- 216345 Savigliano
- 10288 Saville
- 23667 Savinakim
- 6890 Savinykh
- 34856 Savithas
- 4303 Savitskij
- 1494 Savo
- 1525 Savonlinna
- 69259 Savostyanov
- 7677 Sawa
- 8915 Sawaishujiro
- 16552 Sawamura
- 6298 Sawaoka
- 618051 Sawicki
- 18944 Sawilliams
- 2917 Sawyer Hogg
- 3534 Sax
- 11211 Saxena
- 10462 Saxogrammaticus
- 4461 Sayama
- 4189 Sayany
- 3627 Sayers
- 21468 Saylor
- 10367 Sayo
- 32990 Sayo-hime
- 26201 Sayonisaha
- 2081 Sázava
- 28608 Sblomquist
- 1228 Scabiosa
- 26393 Scaffa
- 24728 Scagell
- 25035 Scalesse
- 2812 Scaltriti
- 460 Scania
- 8131 Scanlon
- 5248 Scardia
- 6532 Scarfe
- 6480 Scarlatti
- 198450 Scattolin
- 49441 Scerbanenco
- 3333 Schaber
- 30416 Schacht
- 315186 Schade
- 5265 Schadow
- 15412 Schaefer
- 178243 Schaerding
- 33495 Schaferjames
- 1742 Schaifers
- 95247 Schalansky
- 1542 Schalén
- 8541 Schalkenmehren
- 42613 Schaller
- 33443 Schambeau
- 6376 Schamp
- 31729 Scharmen
- 601476 Scharun
- 25232 Schatz
- 17764 Schatzman
- 1797 Schaumasse
- 10448 Schawlow
- 23383 Schedios
- 8887 Scheeres
- 2485 Scheffler
- 643 Scheherezade
- 31032 Scheidemann
- 79087 Scheidt
- 596 Scheila
- 85216 Schein
- 62794 Scheirich
- 195600 Scheithauer
- 30773 Schelde
- 10975 Schelderode
- 12661 Schelling
- 8807 Schenk
- 9639 Scherer
- 11553 Scheria
- 576466 Scherpenisse
- 4062 Schiaparelli
- 11231 Schiavo
- 541550 Schickbéla
- 22546 Schickler
- 7881 Schieferdecker
- 96535 Schiehallion
- 11338 Schiele
- 190283 Schielicke
- 177667 Schieven
- 595362 Schievink
- 61401 Schiff
- 22945 Schikowski
- 3079 Schiller
- 1255 Schilowa
- 2308 Schilt
- 24060 Schimenti
- 25745 Schimmelpenninck
- 11572 Schindler
- 5297 Schinkel
- 8722 Schirra
- 6352 Schlaun
- 21613 Schlecht
- 12659 Schlegel
- 3536 Schleicher
- 37584 Schleiden
- 12694 Schleiermacher
- 26642 Schlenoff
- 1770 Schlesinger
- 6396 Schleswig
- 9522 Schlichting
- 3302 Schliemann
- 22983 Schlingheyde
- 9273 Schloerb
- 58896 Schlosser
- 21733 Schlottmann
- 6350 Schlüter
- 922 Schlutia
- 2234 Schmadel
- 25140 Schmedemann
- 6601 Schmeer
- 22348 Schmeidler
- 16013 Schmidgall
- 1743 Schmidt
- 79902 Schmidtobreick
- 18395 Schmiedmayer
- 6295 Schmoll
- 30042 Schmude
- 161546 Schneeweis
- 23514 Schneider
- 65712 Schneidmüller
- 1782 Schneller
- 29203 Schnitger
- 30836 Schnittke
- 2871 Schober
- 24277 Schoch
- 4527 Schoenberg
- 5071 Schoenmaker
- 8961 Schoenobaenus
- 53839 Schölkopf
- 2959 Scholl
- 38643 Scholten
- 120452 Schombert
- 12514 Schommer
- 33882 Schönbächler
- 19992 Schönbein
- 5926 Schönfeld
- 68779 Schöninger
- 17958 Schoof
- 7015 Schopenhauer
- 187123 Schorderet
- 18203 Schörghofer
- 1235 Schorria
- 5312 Schott
- 11773 Schouten
- 48422 Schrade
- 113952 Schramm
- 27248 Schristensen
- 13092 Schrödinger
- 19290 Schroeder
- 4983 Schroeteria
- 3707 Schröter
- 2665 Schrutka
- 1911 Schubart
- 14728 Schuchardt
- 28743 Schuitemaker
- 541571 Schulekfrigyes
- 2384 Schulhof
- 17976 Schulman
- 32260 Schult
- 3524 Schulz
- 5704 Schumacher
- 4003 Schumann
- 15761 Schumi
- 5779 Schupmann
- 70850 Schur
- 2429 Schürer
- 2018 Schuster
- 4134 Schütz
- 2923 Schuyler
- 257437 Schuylervandyk
- 13006 Schwaar
- 6209 Schwaben
- 7580 Schwabhausen
- 2119 Schwall
- 11814 Schwamb
- 2149 Schwambraniya
- 104896 Schwanden
- 21738 Schwank
- 13820 Schwartz
- 837 Schwarzschilda
- 10663 Schwarzwald
- 989 Schwassmannia
- 13724 Schwehm
- 1265 Schweikarda
- 34266 Schweinfurth
- 7698 Schweitzer
- 24699 Schwekendiek
- 281764 Schwetzingen
- 32890 Schwob
- 278513 Schwope
- 14145 Sciam
- 41206 Sciannameo
- 12380 Sciascia
- 28618 Scibelli
- 7756 Scientia
- 240725 Scipioni
- 7334 Sciurus
- 3350 Scobee
- 17883 Scobuchanan
- 27312 Sconantgilbert
- 6632 Scoon
- 7735 Scorzelli
- 114024 Scotkleinman
- 876 Scott
- 135980 Scottanderson
- 188806 Scottbednar
- 32384 Scottbest
- 9544 Scottbirney
- 10191 Scottbolton
- 17783 Scottbrunner
- 8022 Scottcrossfield
- 333620 Scottfrancis
- 281445 Scotthowe
- 3594 Scotti
- 227310 Scottkardel
- 33434 Scottmanley
- 30316 Scottmassa
- 16094 Scottmccord
- 132005 Scottmcgregor
- 115891 Scottmichael
- 30293 Scottnelson
- 210686 Scottnorris
- 33811 Scottobin
- 30123 Scottrippeon
- 15779 Scottroberts
- 21962 Scottsandford
- 17898 Scottsheppard
- 25815 Scottskirlo
- 132792 Scottsmith
- 12668 Scottstarin
- 17216 Scottstuart
- 144716 Scotttucker
- 96344 Scottweaver
- 14698 Scottyoung
- 22833 Scottyu
- 4939 Scovil
- 781753 Scurtu
- 155 Scylla
- 1306 Scythia
- 4856 Seaborg
- 9279 Seager
- 5574 Seagrave
- 25476 Sealfon
- 34402 Seamusanderson
- 7051 Sean
- 34284 Seancampbell
- 304273 Seancarey
- 13070 Seanconnery
- 47045 Seandaniel
- 28095 Seanmahoney
- 32151 Seanmarshall
- 210533 Seanmisner
- 13257 Seanntorres
- 78905 Seanokeefe
- 20290 Seanraj
- 25137 Seansolomon
- 60148 Seanurban
- 22929 Seanwahl
- 13623 Seanwalker
- 28757 Seanweber
- 13157 Searfoss
- 4473 Sears
- 1482 Sebastiana
- 95895 Sebastiano
- 368617 Sebastiánotero
- 166622 Sébastien
- 20701 Sébastiencharnoz
- 31689 Sebmellen
- 231969 Sebvauclair
- 429032 Sebvonhoerner
- 4705 Secchi
- 21192 Seccisergio
- 5234 Sechenov
- 43193 Secinaro
- 17166 Secombe
- 20186 Seda
- 33622 Sedigh
- 90377 Sedna
- 157064 Sedona
- 2785 Sedov
- 17955 Sedransk
- 8130 Seeberg
- 6553 Seehaus
- 65241 Seeley
- 892 Seeligeria
- 8310 Seelos
- 309917 Sefyani
- 21683 Segal
- 7733 Segarpassi
- 18567 Segenthau
- 7285 Seggewiss
- 28878 Segner
- 24645 Šegon
- 64553 Segorbe
- 25340 Segoves
- 3822 Segovia
- 29910 Segre
- 75190 Segreliliana
- 14206 Sehnal
- 136666 Seidel
- 3217 Seidelmann
- 4369 Seifert
- 30831 Seignovert
- 592750 Seiichifujiwara
- 18461 Seiichikanno
- 10351 Seiichisato
- 32200 Seiicyoshida
- 11442 Seijin-Sanso
- 20711 Seijisugita
- 4607 Seilandfarm
- 2292 Seili
- 2364 Seillier
- 5541 Seimei
- 1521 Seinäjoki
- 10735 Seine
- 21625 Seira
- 214863 Seiradakis
- 7533 Seiraiji
- 10226 Seishika
- 8575 Seishitakeuchi
- 9654 Seitennokai
- 4893 Seitter
- 4978 Seitz
- 16700 Seiwa
- 6868 Seiyauyeda
- 21985 Šejna
- 7365 Sejong
- 1913 Sekanina
- 5381 Sekhmet
- 24226 Sekhsaria
- 3426 Seki
- 5357 Sekiguchi
- 5631 Sekihokutouge
- 9960 Sekine
- 14443 Sekinenomatsu
- 7483 Sekitakakazu
- 32854 Sekitakayuki
- 13406 Sekora
- 7725 Selʹvinskij
- 27192 Selenali
- 580 Selene
- 3288 Seleucus
- 18565 Selg
- 500 Selinur
- 315174 Sellek
- 17078 Sellers
- 5789 Sellin
- 12943 Selmademink
- 79989 Selman
- 20437 Selohusa
- 136818 Selqet
- 28625 Selvakumar
- 14693 Selwyn
- 19364 Semafor
- 685739 Semago
- 4811 Semashko
- 86 Semele
- 12220 Semenchur
- 20045 Semeniuk
- 18015 Semenkovich
- 2475 Semenov
- 20740 Sémery
- 10670 Seminozhenko
- 584 Semiramis
- 2182 Semirot
- 4170 Semmelweis
- 7174 Semois
- 6353 Semper
- 1014 Semphyra
- 284357 Semseyandor
- 14015 Senancour
- 8603 Senator
- 207687 Senckenberg
- 3133 Sendai
- 9628 Sendaiotsuna
- 20664 Senec
- 2608 Seneca
- 4906 Seneferu
- 112338 Seneseconte
- 29959 Senevelling
- 59001 Senftenberg
- 10197 Senigalliesi
- 9785 Senjikan
- 7980 Senkevich
- 6543 Senna
- 5330 Senrikyu
- 550 Senta
- 17091 Senthalir
- 17052 Senthilvel
- 56957 Seohideaki
- 28480 Seojinyoung
- 182122 Sepan
- 7552 Sephton
- 7173 Sepkoski
- 483 Seppina
- 6238 Septimaclark
- 1103 Sequoia
- 113622 Serafinacarpino
- 97268 Serafinozani
- 838 Seraphina
- 14975 Serasin
- 790726 Șerbu
- 365375 Serebrov
- 34194 Serenajing
- 27309 Serenamccalla
- 6568 Serendip
- 24155 Serganov
- 36235 Sergebaudo
- 4470 Sergeev-Censkij
- 296638 Sergeibelov
- 4363 Sergej
- 649792 Sergejbondar
- 7730 Sergerasimov
- 49118 Sergerochain
- 4829 Sergestus
- 591861 Sergeyyazev
- 573814 Sergeyzvyagin
- 172430 Sergiofonti
- 101493 Sergiofoparri
- 23755 Sergiolozano
- 15418 Sergiospinelli
- 17186 Sergivanov
- 11022 Serio
- 2225 Serkowski
- 20046 Seronik
- 3547 Serov
- 9968 Serpe
- 58573 Serpieri
- 19629 Serra
- 549151 Serra-Ricart
- 25743 Serrato
- 2691 Sérsic
- 9629 Servet
- 5205 Servián
- 21311 Servius
- 5094 Seryozha
- 166749 Sesar
- 4414 Sesostris
- 10006 Sessai
- 34403 Sessin
- 241509 Sessler
- 6818 Sessyu
- 86551 Seth
- 29085 Sethanne
- 8618 Sethjacobson
- 70713 Sethmacfarlane
- 21709 Sethmurray
- 5009 Sethos
- 58622 Setoguchi
- 166944 Seton
- 3392 Setouchi
- 6251 Setsuko
- 21187 Setsuo
- 8885 Sette
- 7846 Setvák
- 6678 Seurat
- 2121 Sevastopol
- 30305 Severi
- 9716 Severina
- 1737 Severny
- 117435 Severochoa
- 143626 Sevialdo
- 28976 Sevigny
- 24607 Sevnatu
- 14189 Sèvre
- 89264 Sewanee
- 22815 Sewell
- 6586 Seydler
- 31944 Seyitherdem
- 266854 Sezenaksu
- 26971 Sezimovo Ústí
- 43414 Sfair
- 66671 Sfasu
- 59232 Sfiligoi
- 10458 Sfranke
- 13921 Sgarbini
- 2263 Shaanxi
- 15427 Shabas
- 18199 Shackelford
- 289586 Shackleton
- 33444 Shaddad
- 21745 Shadfan
- 66002 Shadoks
- 17843 Shaelucero
- 31419 Shafransky
- 6566 Shafter
- 11944 Shaftesbury
- 199757 Shagunsingh
- 25981 Shahmirian
- 15002 Shahriarbayegan
- 33574 Shailaja
- 10014 Shaim
- 5619 Shair
- 1648 Shajna
- 2985 Shakespeare
- 4618 Shakhovskoj
- 5959 Shaklan
- 14322 Shakura
- 3408 Shalamov
- 22640 Shalilabaena
- 25723 Shamascharak
- 254299 Shambleau
- 17903 Shamieh
- 25372 Shanagarza
- 21814 Shanawolff
- 743878 Shandaren
- 2510 Shandong
- 239645 Shandongas
- 29467 Shandongdaxue
- 241442 Shandongkexie
- 32547 Shandroff
- 1994 Shane
- 25058 Shanegould
- 7050 Shanekelly
- 26250 Shaneludwig
- 17939 Shanethread
- 2197 Shanghai
- 91001 Shanghaishida
- 599587 Shangjiaouni
- 21402 Shanhuang
- 22817 Shankar
- 18838 Shannon
- 20812 Shannonbabb
- 30128 Shannonbunch
- 27311 Shannongonzales
- 31461 Shannonlee
- 25404 Shansample
- 18670 Shantanugaur
- 11468 Shantanunaidu
- 3139 Shantou
- 1881 Shao
- 3832 Shapiro
- 1123 Shapleya
- 1902 Shaposhnikov
- 17906 Shapovalov
- 5543 Sharaf
- 17092 Sharanya
- 367633 Shargorodskij
- 175109 Sharickaer
- 5580 Sharidake
- 13282 Sharikahagan
- 4074 Sharkov
- 380607 Sharma
- 33789 Sharmacam
- 3694 Sharon
- 566277 Sharonchan
- 333119 Sharonhelms
- 134072 Sharonhooven
- 2416 Sharonov
- 26588 Sharonstorbo
- 32550 Sharonthomas
- 5426 Sharp
- 20481 Sharples
- 9469 Shashank
- 20712 Shashiganesh
- 30299 Shashkishore
- 12593 Shashlov
- 31556 Shatner
- 25650 Shaubakshi
- 247341 Shaulladany
- 31807 Shaunalennon
- 24332 Shaunalinn
- 134125 Shaundaly
- 30017 Shaundatta
- 127933 Shaunoborn
- 3027 Shavarsh
- 4510 Shawna
- 8642 Shawnkerry
- 34570 Shawnlim
- 11721 Shawnlowe
- 90453 Shawnphillips
- 34102 Shawnzhang
- 412687 Shaxigao
- 20296 Shayestorm
- 4625 Shchedrin
- 2377 Shcheglov
- 3886 Shcherbakovia
- 4870 Shcherbanʹ
- 11450 Shearer
- 1196 Sheba
- 18013 Shedletsky
- 16037 Sheehan
- 4704 Sheena
- 18665 Sheenahayes
- 195777 Sheepman
- 34034 Shehadeh
- 278956 Shei-Pa
- 21618 Sheikh
- 6781 Sheikhumarrkhan
- 30211 Sheilah
- 129148 Sheilahaggard
- 6234 Sheilawolfman
- 3967 Shekhtelia
- 333267 Shekhtman
- 55330 Shekwaihung
- 201372 Sheldon
- 246247 Sheldoncooper
- 6715 Sheldonmarks
- 17601 Sheldonschafer
- 29614 Sheller
- 17280 Shelly
- 22586 Shellyhynes
- 5953 Shelton
- 7925 Shelus
- 30444 Shemp
- 2027 Shen Guo
- 202605 Shenchunshan
- 26551 Shenliangbo
- 2425 Shenzhen
- 8256 Shenzhou
- 23060 Shepherd
- 2036 Sheragul
- 20559 Sheridanlamp
- 8631 Sherikboonstra
- 50722 Sherlin
- 5049 Sherlock
- 21621 Sherman
- 7077 Shermanschultz
- 20375 Sherrigerten
- 117736 Sherrod
- 9270 Sherryjennings
- 9527 Sherrypervan
- 30137 Sherryshaffer
- 26667 Sherwinwu
- 9681 Sherwoodrowland
- 5044 Shestaka
- 5707 Shevchenko
- 20713 Sheward
- 185636 Shiao Lin
- 14338 Shibakoukan
- 27879 Shibata
- 20098 Shibatagenji
- 19313 Shibatakazunari
- 10570 Shibayasuo
- 4350 Shibecha
- 22453 Shibusawaeiichi
- 4634 Shibuya
- 28468 Shichangxu
- 6881 Shifutsu
- 6979 Shigefumi
- 8736 Shigehisa
- 8276 Shigei
- 24981 Shigekimurakami
- 6567 Shigemasa
- 7597 Shigemi
- 4376 Shigemori
- 21015 Shigenari
- 12788 Shigeno
- 15916 Shigeoyamada
- 6707 Shigeru
- 24159 Shigetakahashi
- 9800 Shigetoshi
- 19954 Shigeyoshi
- 17461 Shigosenger
- 91907 Shiho
- 64289 Shihwingching
- 20715 Shijianchun
- 29431 Shijimi
- 4890 Shikanosima
- 34494 Shikarpur
- 7206 Shiki
- 4223 Shikoku
- 175613 Shikoku-karst
- 5962 Shikokutenkyo
- 7450 Shilling
- 4164 Shilov
- 13678 Shimada
- 48591 Shimajiri
- 9231 Shimaken
- 9235 Shimanamikaido
- 3182 Shimanto
- 2879 Shimizu
- 10561 Shimizumasahiro
- 21282 Shimizuyuka
- 14853 Shimokawa
- 18365 Shimomoto
- 11492 Shimose
- 2908 Shimoyama
- 31744 Shimshock
- 4002 Shinagawa
- 13679 Shinanogawa
- 13140 Shinchukai
- 21390 Shindo
- 28481 Shindongju
- 294595 Shingareva
- 19144 Shinichiakiyama
- 24053 Shinichiro
- 16796 Shinji
- 15910 Shinkamigoto
- 7309 Shinkawakami
- 9745 Shinkenwada
- 4498 Shinkoyama
- 11809 Shinnaka
- 18609 Shinobuyama
- 14555 Shinohara
- 10882 Shinonaga
- 9076 Shinsaku
- 47086 Shinseiko
- 5815 Shinsengumi
- 13094 Shinshuueda
- 26459 Shinsubin
- 23887 Shinsukeabe
- 21368 Shiodayama
- 160903 Shiokaze
- 55873 Shiomidake
- 34817 Shiominemoto
- 6337 Shiota
- 2530 Shipka
- 20096 Shiraishiakihiko
- 21302 Shirakamisanchi
- 6198 Shirakawa
- 22470 Shirakawa-go
- 5692 Shirao
- 12326 Shirasaki
- 10148 Shirase
- 85400 Shiratakachu
- 13942 Shiratakihime
- 20357 Shireendhir
- 3867 Shiretoko
- 5624 Shirley
- 195772 Shirleygrace
- 11136 Shirleymarinus
- 30283 Shirleysmith
- 549648 Shirokov
- 6767 Shirvindt
- 325369 Shishilov
- 9466 Shishir
- 3558 Shishkin
- 362238 Shisseh
- 584947 Shistovsky
- 24186 Shivanisud
- 11682 Shiwaku
- 33288 Shixian
- 27610 Shixuanli
- 28530 Shiyimeng
- 132825 Shizu-Mao
- 4200 Shizukagozen
- 364630 Shizuoka
- 7634 Shizutani-Kou
- 2849 Shklovskij
- 4364 Shkodrov
- 25156 Shkolnik
- 12234 Shkuratov
- 1833 Shmakova
- 10286 Shnollia
- 148604 Shobbrook
- 2074 Shoemaker
- 20717 Shogotachibana
- 8913 Shohinighose
- 26919 Shoichimiyata
- 75308 Shoin
- 8578 Shojikato
- 19254 Shojitomoko
- 208499 Shokasonjuku
- 8306 Shoko
- 48778 Shokoyukako
- 2448 Sholokhov
- 27420 Shontobegay
- 3946 Shor
- 16599 Shorland
- 5627 Short
- 6158 Shosanbetsu
- 5395 Shosasaki
- 22554 Shoshanatell
- 188822 Shoshanazweider
- 354903 Shostak
- 2669 Shostakovich
- 7594 Shotaro
- 33975 Shotatakahashi
- 19818 Shotwell
- 5922 Shouichi
- 11852 Shoumen
- 4973 Showa
- 18499 Showalter
- 8874 Showashinzan
- 14873 Shoyo
- 10366 Shozosato
- 6844 Shpak
- 21703 Shravanimikk
- 78536 Shrbený
- 25178 Shreebose
- 17074 Shreshth
- 33188 Shreya
- 32281 Shreyamenon
- 34338 Shreyaskar
- 13710 Shridhar
- 681819 Shriekback
- 9804 Shrikulkarni
- 17065 Shrilashah
- 33806 Shrivastava
- 17015 Shriyareddy
- 25478 Shrock
- 115331 Shrylmiles
- 34852 Shteyman
- 7278 Shtokolov
- 565571 Shtol
- 27254 Shubhrosaha
- 9436 Shudo
- 356786 Shuike
- 27396 Shuji
- 12596 Shukla
- 2777 Shukshin
- 4787 Shulʹzhenko
- 31363 Shulga
- 4187 Shulnazaria
- 16525 Shumarinaiko
- 13906 Shunda
- 9254 Shunkai
- 29986 Shunsuke
- 1977 Shura
- 279274 Shurpakov
- 27572 Shurtleff
- 8822 Shuryanka
- 9145 Shustov
- 14310 Shuttleworth
- 8609 Shuvalov
- 22919 Shuwan
- 4196 Shuya
- 633348 Shvartsman
- 124450 Shyamalan
- 26537 Shyamalbuch
- 143750 Shyamkumar
- 157534 Šiauliai
- 12013 Sibatahosimi
- 21042 Sibeck
- 1405 Sibelius
- 1094 Siberia
- 168 Sibylla
- 229280 Sica
- 6280 Sicardy
- 229864 Sichouzhilu
- 2215 Sichuan
- 1258 Sicilia
- 171112 Sickafoose
- 7866 Sicoli
- 25182 Siddhawan
- 10704 Sidey
- 10109 Sidhu
- 36672 Sidi
- 2343 Siding Spring
- 26665 Sidjena
- 116162 Sidneygutierrez
- 68448 Sidneywolff
- 579 Sidonia
- 12594 Sidorclare
- 9005 Sidorova
- 11792 Sidorovsky
- 7162 Sidwell
- 1632 Sieböhme
- 5448 Siebold
- 5375 Siedentopf
- 10446 Siegbahn
- 386 Siegena
- 15147 Siegfried
- 73701 Siegfriedbauer
- 2560 Siegma
- 15448 Siegwarth
- 189396 Sielewicz
- 208351 Sielmann
- 367436 Siena
- 292490 Sienkiewicz
- 32610 Siennafink
- 17030 Sierks
- 199950 Sierpc
- 12598 Sierra
- 333176 Sierragonzales
- 202806 Sierrastars
- 4484 Sif
- 7203 Sigeki
- 552 Sigelinde
- 8544 Sigenori
- 22802 Sigiriya
- 6571 Sigmund
- 17737 Sigmundjähn
- 8239 Signac
- 459 Signe
- 550525 Sigourneyweaver
- 33190 Sigrest
- 1493 Sigrid
- 11009 Sigridclose
- 502 Sigune
- 11066 Sigurd
- 290181 Sigut
- 3631 Sigyn
- 25878 Sihengyou
- 3201 Sijthoff
- 22739 Sikhote-Alin
- 10090 Sikorsky
- 8561 Sikoruk
- 308825 Siksika
- 79360 Sila–Nunam
- 3943 Silbermann
- 10055 Silcher
- 5710 Silentium
- 257 Silesia
- 20718 Šilha
- 7770 Siljan
- 1733 Silke
- 1446 Sillanpää
- 21627 Sillis
- 129234 Silly
- 20723 Siltala
- 319601 Šilutė
- 22618 Silva Nortica
- 15899 Silvain
- 550832 Silvanacopceski
- 162500 Silvanodelbo’
- 214715 Silvanofuso
- 6853 Silvanomassaglia
- 5003 Silvanominuto
- 5325 Silver
- 30425 Silverman
- 168948 Silvestri
- 131766 Silviaferrara
- 159865 Silvialonso
- 541487 Silviapablo
- 23589 Silvmellini
- 29753 Silvo
- 1317 Silvretta
- 23437 Šíma
- 12620 Simaqian
- 741718 Simard
- 4692 SIMBAD
- 7924 Simbirsk
- 17982 Simcmillan
- 748 Simeïsa
- 14098 Šimek
- 239203 Simeon
- 2141 Simferopol
- 333230 Simkus
- 22294 Simmons
- 32720 Simoeisios
- 5830 Simohiro
- 91287 Simon-Garfunkel
- 1033 Simona
- 78830 Simonadirubbo
- 34408 Simonanghel
- 54983 Simone
- 34652 Simoneevans
- 28817 Simoneflood
- 32516 Simoneieva
- 6950 Simonek
- 8071 Simonelli
- 72543 Simonemarchi
- 4280 Simonenko
- 317000 Simonepastore
- 37836 Simoneterreni
- 29706 Simonetta
- 9831 Simongreen
- 8625 Simonhelberg
- 142401 Simonhook
- 1675 Simonida
- 58750 Simonjeanne
- 216164 Simonkrughoff
- 2426 Simonov
- 11467 Simonporter
- 149528 Simónrodríguez
- 24068 Simonsen
- 53237 Simonson
- 142275 Simonyi
- 19656 Simpkins
- 4788 Simpson
- 6860 Sims
- 11914 Sinachopoulos
- 7934 Sinatra
- 20483 Sinay
- 21412 Sinchanban
- 15828 Sincheskul
- 41488 Sindbad
- 3847 Šindel
- 10369 Sinden
- 609363 Sinelo
- 10698 Singer
- 12599 Singhal
- 31706 Singhani
- 6125 Singto
- 16014 Sinha
- 200052 Sinigaglia
- 53256 Sinitiere
- 17004 Sinkevich
- 3706 Sinnott
- 3391 Sinon
- 4333 Sinton
- 4512 Sinuhe
- 4981 Sinyavskaya
- 8529 Sinzi
- 3389 Sinzot
- 312001 Siobhánhaughey
- 6277 Siok
- 248230 Sion
- 34202 Sionaprasad
- 21629 Siperstein
- 31931 Sipiera
- 204805 Šipöcz
- 31871 Siqueiros
- 15860 Siráň
- 12445 Sirataka
- 29355 Siratakayama
- 314988 Sireland
- 1009 Sirene
- 332 Siri
- 20293 Sirichelson
- 23310 Siriwon
- 169299 Sirko
- 116 Sirona
- 7737 Sirrah
- 21416 Sisichen
- 823 Sisigambis
- 18771 Sisiliang
- 6675 Sisley
- 5170 Sissons
- 1866 Sisyphus
- 244 Sita
- 20205 Sitanchen
- 2042 Sitarski
- 5998 Sitenský
- 52231 Sitnik
- 188973 Siufaiwing
- 209540 Siurana
- 392070 Siurell
- 1170 Siva
- 30191 Sivakumar
- 333178 Sivaperuman
- 22253 Sivers
- 140 Siwa
- 10234 Sixtygarden
- 23182 Siyaxuza
- 27125 Siyilee
- 22921 Siyuanliu
- 20888 Siyueguo
- 8683 Sjölander
- 101331 Sjöström
- 7218 Skácel
- 26954 Skadiang
- 2619 Skalnaté Pleso
- 48767 Skamander
- 327977 Skarga
- 31020 Skarupa
- 333052 Skeen
- 6630 Skepticus
- 78115 Skiantonucci
- 2554 Skiff
- 14179 Skinner
- 1884 Skip
- 299897 Skipitis
- 134131 Skipowens
- 195998 Skipwilson
- 26659 Skirda
- 177157 Skoffelza
- 10270 Skoglöv
- 10112 Skookumjim
- 3283 Skorina
- 68585 Skorov
- 2431 Skovoroda
- 36888 Škrabal
- 5104 Skripnichenko
- 9727 Skrutskie
- 6549 Skryabin
- 22404 Skujytė
- 1130 Skuld
- 14694 Skurat
- 26314 Škvorecký
- 1854 Skvortsov
- 34241 Skylerjones
- 3243 Skytel
- 274020 Skywalker
- 8074 Slade
- 4781 Sládkovič
- 24173 SLAS
- 30413 Slatkin
- 14708 Slaven
- 214678 Slavėnas
- 2304 Slavia
- 31124 Slavíček
- 11325 Slavický
- 2821 Slávka
- 31232 Slavonice
- 6575 Slavov
- 136825 Slawitschek
- 45492 Sławomirbreiter
- 9391 Slee
- 346471 Sleeperhennig
- 33625 Slepyan
- 4793 Slessor
- 9001 Slettebak
- 34379 Slettnes
- 1766 Slipher
- 17215 Slivan
- 78756 Sloan
- 246913 Slocum
- 19658 Sloop
- 12423 Slotin
- 3423 Slouka
- 1807 Slovakia
- 9674 Slovenija
- 542461 Slovinský
- 7453 Slovtsov
- 251001 Sluch
- 57509 Sly
- 30435 Slyusarev
- 128242 Šmahel
- 7545 Smaklösa
- 10287 Smale
- 36445 Smalley
- 2047 Smetana
- 2580 Smilevskia
- 1613 Smiley
- 5540 Smirnova
- 3351 Smith
- 2083 Smither
- 3773 Smithsonian
- 4926 Smoktunovskij
- 10983 Smolders
- 3213 Smolensk
- 4530 Smoluchowski
- 26689 Smorrison
- 34089 Smoter
- 582928 Smriglio
- 1731 Smuts
- 5413 Smyslov
- 20159 Snead
- 133008 Snedden
- 20732 Snedeker
- 25698 Snehakannan
- 16015 Snell
- 4379 Snelling
- 599083 Snezhko
- 1262 Sniadeckia
- 14724 SNO
- 158589 Snodgrass
- 129092 Snowdonia
- 15512 Snyder
- 6581 Sobers
- 14719 Sobey
- 4449 Sobinov
- 2836 Sobolev
- 26401 Sobotište
- 348239 Societàdante
- 3708 Socus
- 2479 Sodankylä
- 2864 Soderblom
- 228135 Sodnik
- 8274 Soejima
- 189398 Soemmerring
- 1393 Sofala
- 239672 SOFIA
- 33162 Sofiarandich
- 301021 Sofiarodriguez
- 34876 Sofiatomov
- 2259 Sofievka
- 278386 Sofivanna
- 11791 Sofiyavarzar
- 7262 Sofue
- 30012 Sohamdaga
- 12199 Sohlman
- 29685 Soibamansoor
- 5414 Sokolov
- 3557 Sokolsky
- 5450 Sokrates
- 3490 Šolc
- 14190 Soldán
- 182262 Solène
- 9872 Solf
- 392142 Solheim
- 8991 Solidarity
- 11542 Solikamsk
- 28629 Solimano
- 28543 Solis-Gozar
- 5367 Sollenberger
- 10796 Sollerman
- 3229 Solnhofen
- 9741 Solokhin
- 10054 Solomin
- 3279 Solon
- 84945 Solosky
- 6755 Solovʹyanenko
- 5417 Solovaya
- 5078 Solovjev-Sedoj
- 4622 Solovjova
- 188209 Solpera
- 6974 Solti
- 187981 Soluri
- 7537 Solvay
- 1331 Solvejg
- 4915 Solzhenitsyn
- 2815 Soma
- 1430 Somalia
- 19318 Somanah
- 31600 Somasundaram
- 33746 Sombart
- 12801 Somekawa
- 5771 Somerville
- 32082 Sominsky
- 7399 Somme
- 32809 Sommerfeld
- 85214 Sommersdorf
- 3258 Somnium
- 3334 Somov
- 2455 Somville
- 30298 Somyakhare
- 28912 Sonahosseini
- 559521 Sonbird
- 34597 Sondy
- 3821 Sonet
- 210210 Songjian
- 23686 Songyuan
- 6938 Soniaterk
- 12664 Sonisenia
- 1293 Sonja
- 32634 Sonjamichaluk
- 1039 Sonneberga
- 10962 Sonnenborgh
- 8796 Sonnett
- 11099 Sonodamasaki
- 25164 Sonomastate
- 2432 Soomana
- 18876 Sooner
- 4699 Sootan
- 2433 Sootiyo
- 251 Sophia
- 32034 Sophiakorner
- 33661 Sophiaswartz
- 17126 Sophiawang
- 22922 Sophiecai
- 20733 Sophiejacquinod
- 10026 Sophiexeon
- 2921 Sophocles
- 134 Sophrosyne
- 880193 Sopoćko
- 157141 Sopron
- 574506 Sopronilíceum
- 4865 Sor
- 16594 Sorachi
- 9093 Sorada
- 3864 Søren
- 250955 Sorena
- 731 Sorga
- 5989 Sorin
- 724427 Sorinhotea
- 3993 Šorm
- 6882 Sormano
- 55477 Soroban
- 2682 Soromundi
- 3652 Soros
- 31418 Sosaoyarzabal
- 9878 Sostero
- 17543 Sosva
- 552681 Sósvera
- 54963 Sotin
- 121756 Sotomejias
- 15587 Sotsukamoto
- 48424 Souchay
- 13226 Soulié
- 4039 Souseki
- 15028 Soushiyou
- 8200 Souten
- 26715 South Dakota
- 6033 Southwood
- 2647 Sova
- 31642 Soyounchoi
- 2228 Soyuz-Apollo
- 162755 Spacesora
- 4255 Spacewatch
- 15381 Spadolini
- 2975 Spahr
- 162002 Spalatin
- 10350 Spallanzani
- 25956 Spanierbeckage
- 198968 Sparke
- 51772 Sparker
- 15129 Sparks
- 16646 Sparrman
- 2579 Spartacus
- 11268 Spassky
- 549706 Spbuni
- 8329 Speckman
- 18132 Spector
- 86196 Specula
- 19596 Spegorlarson
- 29471 Spejbl
- 2459 Spellmann
- 117329 Spencer
- 3282 Spencer Jones
- 33702 Spencergreen
- 180141 Sperauskas
- 24857 Sperello
- 10951 Spessart
- 28800 Speth
- 33628 Spettel
- 263932 Speyer
- 896 Sphinx
- 2065 Spicer
- 10954 Spiegel
- 25930 Spielberg
- 401820 Špilas
- 11082 Spilliaert
- 12201 Spink
- 11900 Spinoy
- 7142 Spinoza
- 3207 Spinrad
- 1091 Spiraea
- 17071 Spiride
- 1330 Spiridonia
- 37452 Spirit
- 2160 Spitzer
- 5493 Spitzweg
- 5410 Spivakov
- 12512 Split
- 129099 Spoelhof
- 377108 Spoelie
- 22354 Sposetti
- 78310 Spoto
- 12112 Sprague
- 4789 Sprattia
- 5380 Sprigg
- 211977 Springob
- 23990 Springsteen
- 65159 Sprowls
- 7560 Spudis
- 13774 Spurný
- 16260 Sputnik
- 10044 Squyres
- 1564 Srbija
- 33590 Sreelakshmi
- 30048 Sreyasmisra
- 32308 Sreyavemuri
- 544541 Srholec
- 34329 Sribhimaraju
- 15629 Sriner
- 32299 Srinivas
- 21748 Srinivasan
- 20734 Sriramsaran
- 16202 Srivastava
- 70409 Srnín
- 260098 Staargyula
- 152481 Stabia
- 13389 Stacey
- 27563 Staceychristen
- 28093 Staceylevoit
- 22112 Staceyraw
- 93256 Stach
- 165612 Stackpole
- 129811 Stacyoliver
- 3875 Staehle
- 13857 Stafford
- 90926 Stáhalík
- 8154 Stahl
- 13714 Stainbrook
- 2250 Stalingrad
- 12340 Stalle
- 9882 Stallman
- 7623 Stamitz
- 3440 Stampfer
- 35446 Stáňa
- 188139 Stanbridge
- 21434 Stanchiang
- 19407 Standing Bear
- 3420 Standish
- 10131 Stånga
- 7632 Stanislav
- 464743 Stanislavkomárek
- 13005 Stankonyukhov
- 9626 Stanley
- 151349 Stanleycooper
- 22473 Stanleyhey
- 22475 Stanrunge
- 20028 Stansammy
- 32432 Stansberry
- 17233 Stanshapiro
- 23091 Stansill
- 10078 Stanthorpe
- 33499 Stanton
- 32770 Starchik
- 8958 Stargazer
- 31442 Stark
- 6864 Starkenburg
- 20175 Starmus
- 23044 Starodub
- 4150 Starr
- 19208 Starrfield
- 22003 Startek
- 7373 Stashis
- 128610 Stasiahabenicht
- 4131 Stasik
- 288961 Stasysgirėnas
- 831 Stateira
- 207754 Stathiskafalis
- 9536 Statler
- 3398 Stättmayer
- 24547 Stauber
- 30417 Staudt
- 8171 Stauffenberg
- 19918 Stavby
- 1147 Stavropolis
- 18431 Stazzema
- 2035 Stearns
- 2300 Stebbins
- 16236 Stebrehmer
- 69295 Stecklum
- 13715 Steed
- 4713 Steel
- 333253 Steele
- 731815 Stefanberg
- 154865 Stefanheutz
- 4624 Stefani
- 349407 Stefaniafoglia
- 378917 Stefankarge
- 24147 Stefanmuller
- 129807 Stefanodougherty
- 131767 Stefanomancuso
- 73872 Stefanoragazzi
- 11476 Stefanosimoni
- 9121 Stefanovalentini
- 19331 Stefanovitale
- 113623 Stefanovoglino
- 8943 Stefanozavka
- 801007 Stefanpopcot
- 25151 Stefanschröder
- 33329 Stefanwan
- 213800 Stefanwul
- 17597 Stefanzweig
- 6814 Steffl
- 20631 Stefuller
- 9880 Stegosaurus
- 6482 Steiermark
- 134135 Steigerwald
- 15132 Steigmeyer
- 707 Steina
- 552847 Steinaurél
- 32810 Steinbach
- 13499 Steinberg
- 590269 Steinberger
- 737028 Steinbring
- 150081 Steindl
- 249541 Steinem
- 250526 Steinerzsuzsanna
- 201751 Steinhardt
- 30837 Steinheil
- 6563 Steinheim
- 21420 Steinicke
- 30488 Steinlechner
- 1681 Steinmetz
- 2867 Šteins
- 29832 Steinwehr
- 13253 Stejneger
- 97069 Stek
- 4604 Stekarstrom
- 17437 Stekene
- 21433 Stekramer
- 187680 Stelck
- 24208 Stelguerrero
- 15391 Steliomancinelli
- 3140 Stellafane
- 22190 Stellakwee
- 157533 Stellamarie
- 8589 Stellaris
- 10260 Stellaseitz
- 14016 Steller
- 24916 Stelzhamer
- 13911 Stempels
- 15314 Stenbergwieser
- 42485 Stendhal
- 70737 Stenflo
- 15239 Stenhammar
- 10013 Stenholm
- 10553 Stenkumla
- 10125 Stenkyrka
- 11004 Stenmark
- 2146 Stentor
- 3444 Stepanian
- 6220 Stepanmakarov
- 3493 Stepanov
- 23750 Stepciechan
- 117390 Stephanegendron
- 322577 Stephanhellmich
- 220 Stephania
- 134039 Stephaniebarnes
- 594983 Stéphaniecôté
- 15574 Stephaniehass
- 30232 Stephaniejarmak
- 103738 Stephaniewilson
- 31632 Stephaying
- 27502 Stephbecca
- 28068 Stephbillings
- 30091 Stephenbrown
- 149157 Stephencarr
- 214476 Stephencolbert
- 8373 Stephengould
- 40981 Stephenholland
- 21631 Stephenhonan
- 19123 Stephenlevine
- 33734 Stephenlitt
- 9768 Stephenmaran
- 28610 Stephenriggs
- 43081 Stephenschwartz
- 21737 Stephenshulz
- 9891 Stephensmith
- 16596 Stephenstrauss
- 66856 Stephenvoss
- 13285 Stephicks
- 25686 Stephoskins
- 11449 Stephwerner
- 17128 Stephyoshida
- 566986 Štepka
- 6540 Stepling
- 288960 Steponasdarius
- 566 Stereoskopia
- 10968 Sterken
- 6373 Stern
- 995 Sternberga
- 16209 Sterner
- 2463 Sterpin
- 2238 Steshenko
- 16104 Stesullivan
- 255703 Stetson
- 20735 Stetzler
- 20531 Stevebabcock
- 14942 Stevebaker
- 47835 Stevecoe
- 120364 Stevecooley
- 3672 Stevedberg
- 13822 Stevedodson
- 30204 Stevedoherty
- 352704 Stevefleming
- 15941 Stevegauthier
- 228633 Stevegribbin
- 79485 Stevehackett
- 210854 Stevejaskulek
- 179413 Stevekahn
- 158329 Stevekent
- 40104 Stevekerr
- 16514 Stevelia
- 33348 Stevelliott
- 25521 Stevemorgan
- 628318 Stevemould
- 220331 Stevenarnold
- 13415 Stevenbland
- 14589 Stevenbyrnes
- 30005 Stevenchen
- 149163 Stevenconard
- 21441 Stevencondie
- 6544 Stevendick
- 18877 Stevendodds
- 28382 Stevengillen
- 129146 Stevenglenn
- 23046 Stevengordon
- 9280 Stevenjoy
- 225321 Stevenkoenig
- 46568 Stevenlee
- 25767 Stevennoyce
- 129876 Stevenpeterson
- 38540 Stevens
- 10596 Stevensimpson
- 5211 Stevenson
- 30333 Stevenwang
- 22856 Stevenzeiher
- 304908 Steveoda
- 31450 Stevepreston
- 6403 Steverin
- 79436 Steverothery
- 22605 Steverumsey
- 6154 Stevesynnott
- 201204 Stevewilliams
- 32120 Stevezheng
- 144296 Steviewonder
- 2831 Stevin
- 15371 Steward
- 26712 Stewart
- 149113 Stewartbushman
- 3788 Steyaert
- 17218 Stgeorge
- 3794 Sthenelos
- 22185 Štiavnica
- 65210 Stichius
- 36986 Stickle
- 30443 Stieltjes
- 47931 Stifler
- 7127 Stifter
- 27354 Stiklaitis
- 6116 Still
- 130126 Stillmanchase
- 21472 Stimson
- 601916 Sting
- 225277 Stino
- 30445 Stirling
- 612916 Stirlingcolgate
- 45299 Stivell
- 5173 Stjerneborg
- 1847 Stobbe
- 24646 Stober
- 25938 Stoch
- 10552 Stockholm
- 3981 Stodola
- 551878 Stoeger
- 33518 Stoetzer
- 328677 Stofan
- 4283 Stöffler
- 34462 Stoffregen
- 3715 Štohl
- 30566 Stokes
- 11508 Stolte
- 48794 Stolzová
- 61208 Stonařov
- 5841 Stone
- 9325 Stonehenge
- 75591 Stonemose
- 339223 Stongemorin
- 10168 Stony Ridge
- 383067 Stoofke
- 172996 Stooke
- 22594 Stoops
- 55854 Stoppani
- 1386 Storeria
- 12182 Storm
- 15010 Storrie-Lombardi
- 61912 Storrs
- 6106 Stoss
- 31281 Stothers
- 188256 Stothoff
- 28724 Stott
- 90711 Stotternheim
- 170006 Stoughton
- 20430 Stout
- 24010 Stovall
- 19820 Stowers
- 4876 Strabo
- 1019 Strackea
- 8379 Straczynski
- 19189 Stradivari
- 4824 Stradonice
- 15766 Strahlenberg
- 68730 Straižys
- 18531 Strakonice
- 3236 Strand
- 4690 Strasbourg
- 19136 Strassmann
- 170007 Strateva
- 1560 Strattonia
- 6147 Straub
- 121546 Straulino
- 4559 Strauss
- 4382 Stravinsky
- 17257 Strazzulla
- 74400 Streaky
- 12912 Streator
- 386851 Streep
- 16017 Street
- 23116 Streich
- 33137 Strejček
- 32735 Strekalov
- 6801 Střekov
- 2811 Střemchoví
- 1201 Strenua
- 12481 Streuvels
- 33633 Strickland
- 33634 Strickler
- 10587 Strindberg
- 99070 Strittmatter
- 6281 Strnad
- 1628 Strobel
- 589841 Strobl
- 17913 Strode
- 6437 Stroganov
- 27706 Strogen
- 8408 Strom
- 26761 Stromboli
- 1422 Strömgrenia
- 4310 Strömholm
- 254876 Strommer
- 95851 Stromvil
- 5609 Stroncone
- 22622 Strong
- 1124 Stroobantia
- 12835 Stropek
- 25161 Strosahl
- 17923 Strother
- 7391 Strouhal
- 23875 Strube
- 9176 Struchkova
- 3054 Strugatskia
- 768 Struveana
- 3874 Stuart
- 179647 Stuartrobbins
- 11713 Stubbs
- 58499 Stüber
- 13211 Stucky
- 5552 Studnička
- 690092 Stuhr
- 31113 Stull
- 13816 Stülpner
- 15462 Stumegan
- 3105 Stumpff
- 19662 Stunzi
- 3393 Štúr
- 31043 Sturm
- 207109 Stürmenchopf
- 548715 Stus
- 34215 Stutigarg
- 264020 Stuttgart
- 14121 Stüwe
- 22843 Stverak
- 24695 Štyrský
- 17638 Sualan
- 6438 Suárez
- 964 Subamara
- 6531 Subashiri
- 170009 Subbarao
- 1692 Subbotina
- 21705 Subinmin
- 134124 Subirachs
- 21942 Subramanian
- 297161 Subuchin
- 13689 Succi
- 679829 Sucellos
- 37788 Suchan
- 28810 Suchandler
- 12435 Sudachi
- 27861 Sudachikako
- 7610 Sudbury
- 4176 Sudek
- 19366 Sudingqiang
- 9632 Sudo
- 145588 Sudongpo
- 175548 Sūdžius
- 120186 Suealeman
- 28675 Suejohnston
- 21237 Suematsu
- 22858 Suesong
- 12002 Suess
- 362793 Suetolson
- 417 Suevia
- 5872 Sugano
- 34103 Suganthkannan
- 6520 Sugawa
- 19230 Sugazi
- 14727 Suggs
- 3957 Sugie
- 25893 Sugihara
- 35231 Sugimotojunya
- 29624 Sugiyama
- 34681 Suhahussain
- 34021 Suhanijain
- 16163 Suhanli
- 596996 Suhantzong
- 693043 Suhay
- 58782 Suhelahmeti
- 126578 Suhhosoo
- 589944 Suhua
- 145546 Suiqizhong
- 12515 Suiseki
- 23191 Sujaytyle
- 9196 Sukagawa
- 10725 Sukunabikona
- 752 Sulamitis
- 563 Suleika
- 33567 Sulekhfrederic
- 108496 Sullenberger
- 15133 Sullivan
- 17929 Sully
- 20736 Sultana
- 16505 Sulzer
- 33655 Sumathipala
- 19440 Sumatijain
- 10318 Sumaura
- 2403 Šumava
- 1970 Sumeria
- 15220 Sumerkin
- 5562 Sumi
- 2092 Sumiana
- 1090 Sumida
- 4100 Sumiko
- 8207 Suminao
- 10457 Suminov
- 18290 Sumiyoshi
- 8548 Sumizihara
- 1928 Summa
- 11885 Summanus
- 7344 Summerfield
- 30216 Summerjohnson
- 6962 Summerscience
- 36983 Sumner
- 331785 Sumners
- 4649 Sumoto
- 565139 Sumshchyna
- 25986 Sunanda
- 23294 Sunao
- 23730 Suncar
- 54862 Sundaigakuen
- 17084 Sundararajan
- 33254 Sundaresakumar
- 25023 Sundaresh
- 15315 Sundin
- 1424 Sundmania
- 9374 Sundre
- 6796 Sundsvall
- 19019 Sunflower
- 28535 Sungjanet
- 88879 Sungjaoyiu
- 28425 Sungkanit
- 20737 Sungkicho
- 546756 Sunguoyou
- 27103 Sungwoncho
- 33979 Sunhaochun
- 20743 Sunhojin
- 27241 Sunilpai
- 148081 Sunjiadong
- 21109 Sünkel
- 546846 Sunpeiyuan
- 26612 Sunsetastro
- 3742 Sunshine
- 454505 Suntharalingam
- 185364 Sunweihsin
- 11759 Sunyaev
- 185640 Sunyisui
- 15546 Sunyufeng
- 1656 Suomi
- 17093 Supanklang
- 21925 Supasternak
- 18596 Superbus
- 23313 Supokaivanich
- 25744 Surajmishra
- 768693 Șuran
- 31711 Suresh
- 5181 SURF
- 9567 Surgut
- 2965 Surikov
- 5455 Surkov
- 4383 Suruga
- 4224 Susa
- 11620 Susanagordon
- 25941 Susanahearn
- 24928 Susanbehel
- 47649 Susanbrew
- 27492 Susanduncan
- 149952 Susanhamann
- 19789 Susanjohnson
- 21458 Susank
- 19017 Susanlederer
- 12085 Susanmoore
- 542 Susanna
- 51655 Susannemond
- 10593 Susannesandra
- 20744 Susannewampfler
- 30151 Susanoffner
- 10604 Susanoo
- 24292 Susanragan
- 14679 Susanreed
- 7779 Susanring
- 7194 Susanrose
- 20340 Susanruder
- 22992 Susansmith
- 31883 Susanstern
- 14734 Susanstoker
- 19311 Susantresch
- 3378 Susanvictoria
- 26945 Sushko
- 933 Susi
- 21512 Susieclary
- 12872 Susiestevens
- 21229 Sušil
- 1844 Susilva
- 305776 Susinnogabriele
- 6419 Susono
- 31399 Susorney
- 34197 Susrinivasan
- 9703 Sussenbach
- 724547 Süßenberger
- 161625 Susskind
- 19450 Sussman
- 6925 Susumu
- 7415 Susumuimoto
- 12819 Susumutakahasi
- 45855 Susumuyoshitomi
- 34857 Sutaria
- 100015 Sutcliffe
- 6726 Suthers
- 4767 Sutoku
- 85014 Sutter
- 31940 Sutthiluk
- 2532 Sutton
- 1927 Suvanto
- 2489 Suvorov
- 21632 Suwanasri
- 21272 Suyi
- 25046 Suyihan
- 27849 Suyumbika
- 262419 Suzaka
- 15402 Suzaku
- 4968 Suzamur
- 46920 Suzanedwards
- 15671 Suzannedébarbat
- 10190 Suzannedodd
- 154006 Suzannehawley
- 2719 Suzhou
- 5013 Suzhousanzhong
- 204839 Suzhouyuanlin
- 89282 Suzieimber
- 2393 Suzuki
- 12478 Suzukiseiji
- 8741 Suzukisuzuko
- 8712 Suzuko
- 22140 Suzyamamoto
- 256795 Suzyzahn
- 566631 Svábhegy
- 8871 Svanberg
- 3191 Svanetia
- 223360 Švankmajer
- 11913 Svarna
- 506074 Svarog
- 11014 Svätopluk
- 329 Svea
- 8443 Svecica
- 8614 Svedhem
- 5031 Švejcar
- 7896 Švejk
- 54820 Svenders
- 431803 Šventoji
- 11870 Sverige
- 21104 Sveshnikov
- 17805 Švestka
- 4118 Sveta
- 4135 Svetlanov
- 3483 Svetlov
- 24611 Svetochka
- 613813 Svevastallone
- 154932 Sviderskienė
- 5093 Svirelia
- 4075 Sviridov
- 2559 Svoboda
- 16706 Svojsík
- 21802 Svoreň
- 43783 Svyatitelpyotr
- 9014 Svyatorichter
- 120405 Svyatylivka
- 37556 Svyaztie
- 34619 Swagat
- 4046 Swain
- 34465 Swaminathan
- 13669 Swammerdam
- 107396 Swangin
- 4082 Swann
- 15106 Swanson
- 144362 Swantner
- 31490 Swapnavdeka
- 992 Swasey
- 34492 Swasthikpadma
- 33630 Swathiravi
- 27531 Sweaton
- 3947 Swedenborg
- 7621 Sweelinck
- 8378 Sweeney
- 11727 Sweet
- 28519 Sweetman
- 4194 Sweitzer
- 882 Swetlana
- 420779 Świdwin
- 5035 Swift
- 23672 Swiggum
- 8690 Swindle
- 1637 Swings
- 28747 Swintosky
- 2138 Swissair
- 2168 Swope
- 1714 Sy
- 100416 Syang
- 4679 Sybil
- 18783 Sychamberlin
- 15550 Sydney
- 28108 Sydneybarnes
- 4438 Sykes
- 28820 Sylrobertson
- 20745 Sylvainlodiot
- 519 Sylvania
- 8972 Sylvatica
- 13658 Sylvester
- 87 Sylvia
- 40436 Sylviecoyaud
- 352333 Sylvievauclair
- 134087 Symeonplatts
- 9669 Symmetria
- 18457 Syoheiyamamoto
- 250774 Syosset
- 14795 Syoyou
- 1104 Syringa
- 3360 Syrinx
- 4647 Syuji
- 6346 Syukumeguri
- 265490 Szabados
- 113203 Szabó
- 639292 Szabózoltán
- 547400 Szakcsilakatos
- 170010 Szalay
- 121817 Szatmáry
- 352214 Szczecin
- 652031 Szczepaniak
- 91024 Széchenyi
- 550083 Szécsényi-Nagy
- 28196 Szeged
- 26745 Szeglin
- 358179 Szegőkároly
- 114990 Szeidl
- 344641 Szeleczky
- 3427 Szentmártoni
- 554704 Széppataki
- 728826 Szerbantal
- 171118 Szigetköz
- 546396 Szilágyiáron
- 38442 Szilárd
- 563716 Szinyeimersepál
- 546471 Szipál
- 615914 Sziszferenc
- 199630 Szitkay
- 170011 Szkody
- 2268 Szmytowna
- 9973 Szpilman
- 128062 Szrogh
- 12259 Szukalski
- 198717 Szymczyk
back to top

== See also ==
- List of minor planet discoverers
- List of observatory codes
- Meanings of minor planet names § Index
