= 572 (disambiguation) =

572 CE and 572 BCE are years.

572 may also refer to:

- 572, a natural number
- 572 Rebekka, a minor planet orbiting the Sun
- A572 road, a road in the United Kingdom
- 572 Area Code, the new area code that will be implemented in the Oklahoma City Metro.
- Beiyou 572-class replenishment oiler, a class of a Chinese naval auxiliary ship
- E572 (disambiguation), stearates
- European route E572, a B-class European route in Slovakia
- German submarine U-572, a Nazi German Type VII submarine
- Minuscule 572, a Greek minuscule manuscript of the New Testament
- Mississippi Highway 572, a former state highway in southwestern Mississippi, United States
- R572 road (Ireland), a regional road in Ireland
- Remington Model 572, a pump-action rifle manufactured by Remington Arms
- Remington Model 572 Fieldmaster, a slide-action rifle manufactured by Remington Arms
- United Nations Security Council Resolution 572, adopted in 1985
- USS LST-572, US navy tank landing ship
- USS Sailfish (SSR-572), the lead ship of her class of submarine
