= Sarema =

Sarema may refer to:

- Sarema, an opera by Alexander von Zemlinsky with première in 1897
- 1012 Sarema, asteroid, named after the opera
- Saaremaa, an island in Estonia
