= 548 Kressida =

Minor planet

Discovery
- Discovered by: Paul Götz
- Discovery site: Heidelberg
- Discovery date: 14 October 1904

Designations
- Pronunciation: /ˈkrɛsɪdə/
- Alternative designations: 1904 PC

Orbital characteristics
- Epoch 31 July 2016 (JD 2457600.5)
- Uncertainty parameter 0
- Observation arc: 111.50 yr (40725 d)
- Aphelion: 2.7051 AU (404.68 Gm)
- Perihelion: 1.8592 AU (278.13 Gm)
- Semi-major axis: 2.2822 AU (341.41 Gm)
- Eccentricity: 0.18534
- Orbital period (sidereal): 3.45 yr (1,259.3 d)
- Mean anomaly: 128.11°
- Mean motion: 0° 17^{m} 9.168^{s} / day
- Inclination: 3.8722°
- Longitude of ascending node: 108.436°
- Argument of perihelion: 320.351°

Physical characteristics
- Dimensions: 14.0±1.9 km
- Synodic rotation period: 11.9404 h (0.49752 d)
- Spectral type: S
- Absolute magnitude (H): 11.26

548 Kressida is a minor planet orbiting the Sun. This object was discovered by German astronomer Paul Götz in 1904. It is named after the theatrical character Cressida. This stony S-type asteroid is orbiting at a distance of 2.28 AU from the Sun, with an orbital eccentricity (ovalness) of 0.185 and a period of 3.45 yr. The orbital plane is inclined at an angle of 3.87° to the ecliptic.

Photometric observations of this asteroid from 2021 were used to produce a light curve showing a rotation period of 11.930±0.017 h with a brightness amplitude of 0.44±0.02 in magnitude.
