= Eunomia family =

The Eunomia or Eunomian family (FIN: 502) is a large asteroid family of S-type asteroids named after the asteroid 15 Eunomia. It is the most prominent family in the intermediate asteroid belt and the 6th-largest family with nearly six thousand known members, or approximately 1.4% of all asteroids in the asteroid belt.

== Characteristics ==
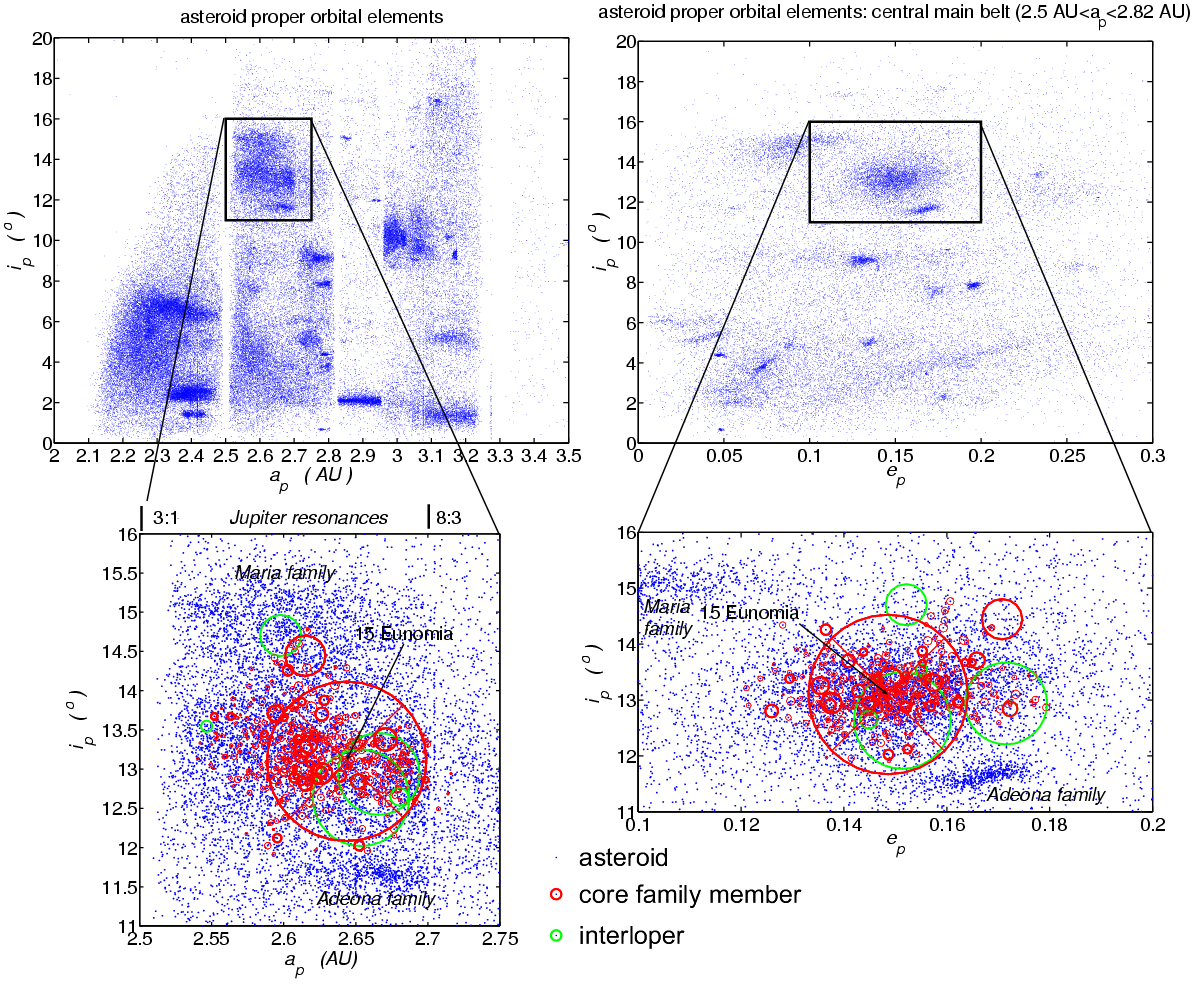
Location and structure of the Eunomia family.

By far the largest member is 15 Eunomia, the largest of all the "stony" S-type asteroid, It is about 300 km across along its longest axis, has a 250 km mean radius, and lies close to the barycenter of the family. Eunomia has been estimated to contain about 70–75% of the matter from the original parent body. This had a mean diameter of about 280 km and was disrupted by the catastrophic impact that created the family. It is likely that the parent body was at least partly differentiated, because the surface of Eunomia and spectra of the smaller family members show some variation. This notwithstanding, other studies have indicated that the body that was definitively shattered by the impact that created the family was probably already somewhat fragmented by previous smaller collisions. The impactor was probably a smaller, yet still very substantial asteroid of 50 km diameter (or so) that hit at a speed of about 22,000 km/h.

The other Eunomian asteroids are quite regularly distributed in orbital space around Eunomia. The next largest member identified by the analysis was 258 Tyche of 65 km diameter. However, its orbit lies at the very margin of what can be considered the family region, and it may well be an interloper. The largest clear family members are about 30 km diameter, with several asteroids in this size range.

Spectroscopic studies have shown that the family members span a noticeable range of compositions, although all remain within the S spectral class. As such they are of generally stony (rather than icy) surface composition that includes silicates and some nickel-iron, and are quite bright for their size.

The family contains relatively large numbers of small objects. Since most of these smaller objects are "eroded" away over time due to secondary collisions, gravitational perturbations, and the Yarkovsky effect, this indicates that the Eunomia family was created relatively recently (on an astronomical timescale).

The Cassini-Huygens spacecraft flew by 2685 Masursky, a small family member, in 2000. However, the encounter distance of about one million kilometers was too large for surface features to be resolved.

== Location and size ==
The Eunomia family is located between the 3:1 and 8:3 resonances with Jupiter, at relatively high inclinations.

A HCM numerical analysis by Zappalà, et al. determined a large group of 'core' family members, whose proper orbital elements lie in the approximate ranges

	a_{p}	e_{p}	i_{p}
min	2.54 AU	0.121	11.6°
max	2.72 AU	0.180	14.8°

At the present epoch, the range of osculating orbital elements of these core members is

	a	e	i
min	2.53 AU	0.078	11.1°
max	2.72 AU	0.218	15.8°

The Zappalà 1995 analysis found 439 core members, while a search of a recent proper element database for 96944 minor planets in 2005 yielded 4649 objects lying within the rectangular-shaped region defined by the first table above. By 2014, Nesvorný identified at total of 5,670, or approximately 1.4% of all asteroids, using the Hierarchical Clustering Method.

== Interlopers ==
A number of interlopers have been identified, which share the same orbital elements as the true family members, but can not have come from the same breakup because of spectral (hence, compositional) differences. The following have been identified in a spectral survey: 85 Io, 141 Lumen, 546 Herodias.
