= 545 Messalina =

Main-belt asteroid

Discovery
- Discovered by: Paul Götz
- Discovery site: Heidelberg
- Discovery date: 3 October 1904

Designations
- Pronunciation: /mɛsəˈliːnə/ or /mɛsəˈlaɪnə/
- Alternative designations: 1904 OY

Orbital characteristics
- Epoch 31 July 2016 (JD 2457600.5)
- Uncertainty parameter 0
- Observation arc: 111.54 yr (40741 d)
- Aphelion: 3.7428 AU (559.91 Gm)
- Perihelion: 2.6600 AU (397.93 Gm)
- Semi-major axis: 3.2014 AU (478.92 Gm)
- Eccentricity: 0.16912
- Orbital period (sidereal): 5.73 yr (2092.2 d)
- Mean anomaly: 305.368°
- Mean motion: 0° 10^{m} 19.416^{s} / day
- Inclination: 11.204°
- Longitude of ascending node: 333.638°
- Argument of perihelion: 330.686°

Physical characteristics
- Mean radius: 55.645±2.15 km
- Mass: (1.38±0.39)×10^{18} kg (Note: Calculated from its standard gravitational parameter GM = 0.092±0.026 km^{3}/s^{2}.)
- Mean density: 1.85 g/cm^{3} (Note: Assuming a diameter of 113 km.)
- Synodic rotation period: 7.2 h (0.30 d)
- Geometric albedo: 0.0415±0.003
- Absolute magnitude (H): 8.84

545 Messalina is a minor planet, specifically an asteroid orbiting primarily in the asteroid belt. It was discovered on 3 October 1904 by Paul Götz (provisional name 1904 OY), at Heidelberg. It is named after Valeria Messalina, the third wife of Roman Emperor Claudius.
