= 544 Jetta =

Main-belt asteroid

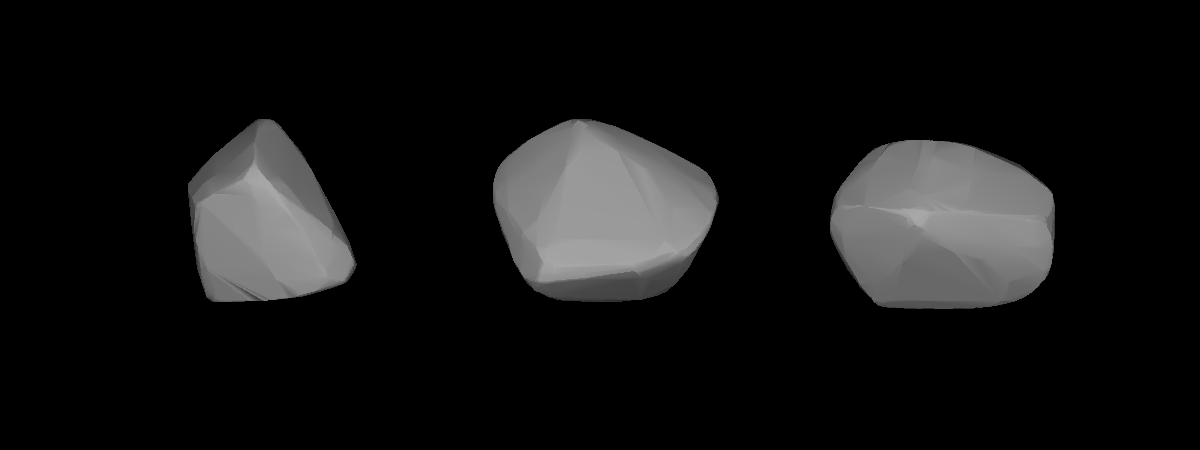
- A three-dimensional model of 544 Jetta based on its light curve

Discovery
- Discovered by: Paul Götz
- Discovery site: Heidelberg
- Discovery date: 11 September 1904

Designations
- Pronunciation: German: [ˈjɛtaː]
- Alternative designations: 1904 OU

Orbital characteristics
- Epoch 31 July 2016 (JD 2457600.5)
- Uncertainty parameter 0
- Observation arc: 111.56 yr (40746 d)
- Aphelion: 2.9864 AU (446.76 Gm)
- Perihelion: 2.1973 AU (328.71 Gm)
- Semi-major axis: 2.5919 AU (387.74 Gm)
- Eccentricity: 0.15223
- Orbital period (sidereal): 4.17 yr (1524.1 d)
- Mean anomaly: 5.52510°
- Mean motion: 0° 14^{m} 10.32^{s} / day
- Inclination: 8.3704°
- Longitude of ascending node: 298.324°
- Argument of perihelion: 343.343°

Physical characteristics
- Mean radius: 12.29±1.65 km
- Synodic rotation period: 7.745 h (0.3227 d)
- Geometric albedo: 0.3208±0.108
- Absolute magnitude (H): 10.0

544 Jetta is a minor planet orbiting the Sun. It is estimated to be 24 km in diameter.
