= 571 Dulcinea =

Main-belt asteroid

Discovery
- Discovered by: Paul Götz
- Discovery site: Heidelberg
- Discovery date: 4 September 1905

Designations
- Pronunciation: /dʌlˈsɪniə, dʌlsɪˈniːə/
- Alternative designations: 1905 QZ

Orbital characteristics
- Epoch 31 July 2016 (JD 2457600.5)
- Uncertainty parameter 0
- Observation arc: 110.57 yr (40387 d)
- Aphelion: 2.9963 AU (448.24 Gm)
- Perihelion: 1.8224 AU (272.63 Gm)
- Semi-major axis: 2.4093 AU (360.43 Gm)
- Eccentricity: 0.24361
- Orbital period (sidereal): 3.74 yr (1366.0 d)
- Mean anomaly: 205.094°
- Mean motion: 0° 15^{m} 48.78^{s} / day
- Inclination: 5.2282°
- Longitude of ascending node: 3.1916°
- Argument of perihelion: 27.650°

Physical characteristics
- Synodic rotation period: 126.3 h (5.26 d)
- Absolute magnitude (H): 11.59

571 Dulcinea is an asteroid orbiting in the inner main belt. It was named after Dulcinea, a character from Miguel de Cervantes' novel Don Quixote. This is classified as a stony S-type asteroid and it is the second largest member of the Erigone collisional family.
