= 546 Herodias =

Carbonaceous asteroid

Discovery
- Discovered by: P. Götz
- Discovery site: Heidelberg Obs.
- Discovery date: 10 October 1904

Designations
- Pronunciation: /hɪˈroʊdiəs/
- Named after: Herodias
- Alternative designations: 1904 PA
- Minor planet category: main-belt · (middle); Eunomian interloper

Orbital characteristics
- Epoch 31 July 2016 (JD 2457600.5)
- Uncertainty parameter 0
- Observation arc: 111.48 yr (40719 d)
- Aphelion: 2.89852 AU (433.612 Gm)
- Perihelion: 2.29588 AU (343.459 Gm)
- Semi-major axis: 2.59720 AU (388.536 Gm)
- Eccentricity: 0.116018
- Orbital period (sidereal): 4.19 yr (1528.8 d)
- Mean anomaly: 149.511°
- Mean motion: 0° 14^{m} 7.714^{s} / day
- Inclination: 14.8547°
- Longitude of ascending node: 21.7900°
- Argument of perihelion: 108.626°

Physical characteristics
- Mean diameter: 66.02±3.8 km
- Mass: (9.1±3.6)×10^{17} kg (Note: Calculated from its standard gravitational parameter GM = 0.061±0.024 km^{3}/s^{2}.)
- Mean density: 6.10 g/cm^{3} (Note: Assuming a diameter of 65.9 km.)
- Synodic rotation period: 10.4 hours 10.77 h (0.449 d)
- Geometric albedo: 0.0534 ± 0.007
- Spectral type: C
- Absolute magnitude (H): 9.70

546 Herodias is a carbonaceous asteroid from the central regions of the asteroid belt, approximately 66 kilometers in diameter. It is an identified Eunomian interloper. It was named after the biblical character Herodias.
