= 547 Praxedis =

Main-belt asteroid

Discovery
- Discovered by: P. Götz
- Discovery site: Heidelberg Obs.
- Discovery date: 14 October 1904

Designations
- Pronunciation: /prækˈsiːdɪs/ (Πραξηδίς)
- Named after: Novel character (Joseph Victor von Scheffel)
- Alternative designations: 1904 PB
- Minor planet category: main-belt · (middle); Postrema

Orbital characteristics
- Epoch 4 September 2017 (JD 2458000.5)
- Uncertainty parameter 0
- Observation arc: 112.72 yr (41,171 days)
- Aphelion: 3.4304 AU
- Perihelion: 2.1237 AU
- Semi-major axis: 2.7770 AU
- Eccentricity: 0.2353
- Orbital period (sidereal): 4.63 yr (1,690 days)
- Mean anomaly: 161.79°
- Mean motion: 0° 12^{m} 46.8^{s} / day
- Inclination: 16.899°
- Longitude of ascending node: 193.21°
- Argument of perihelion: 195.64°

Physical characteristics
- Dimensions: 52.462±1.716 km
- Synodic rotation period: 9.105 h (0.3794 d)
- Geometric albedo: 0.101±0.009
- Spectral type: Tholen = XD: SMASS = Xk; B–V = 0.761; U–B = 0.254
- Absolute magnitude (H): 9.52

547 Praxedis, provisional designation 1904 PB, is a Postremian asteroid from the central regions of the asteroid belt, approximately 52 kilometers in diameter.

== Description ==
The asteroid was discovered on 14 October 1904, by astronomer Paul Götz at the Heidelberg-Königstuhl State Observatory in southwest Germany. It was named from literature after the character "Praxedis" in Joseph Victor von Scheffel's historical romance Ekkehard (1855). The official naming citation was mentioned in The Names of the Minor Planets by Paul Herget in 1955 (H 58).

Praxedis is a member of the Postrema family (541), a mid-sized central asteroid family of little more than 100 members. It orbits the Sun in the central main-belt at a distance of 2.1–3.4 AU once every 4 years and 8 months (1,690 days). Its orbit has an eccentricity of 0.24 and an inclination of 17° with respect to the ecliptic.

In the Tholen classification, Praxedis has an ambiguous spectral type, closest to an X-type and somewhat similar to that of a darker D-type asteroid. In the SMASS classification it is a Xk-subtype that transitions from the X- to the rare K-type asteroids. According to the survey carried out by NASA's Wide-field Infrared Survey Explorer, Praxedis measures 52.462 kilometers in diameter and its surface has an albedo of 0.101.
