= 2278 Götz =

Main-belt asteroid

Discovery
- Discovered by: K. Reinmuth
- Discovery site: Heidelberg Obs.
- Discovery date: 7 April 1953

Designations
- Named after: Paul Götz (German astronomer)
- Alternative designations: 1953 GE · 1953 GR_{1} 1976 GE_{2} · 1976 JG
- Minor planet category: main-belt · (inner) background

Orbital characteristics
- Epoch 23 March 2018 (JD 2458200.5)
- Uncertainty parameter 0
- Observation arc: 65.12 yr (23,784 d)
- Aphelion: 2.8190 AU
- Perihelion: 2.0867 AU
- Semi-major axis: 2.4528 AU
- Eccentricity: 0.1493
- Orbital period (sidereal): 3.84 yr (1,403 d)
- Mean anomaly: 284.69°
- Mean motion: 0° 15^{m} 23.76^{s} / day
- Inclination: 4.2036°
- Longitude of ascending node: 53.419°
- Argument of perihelion: 207.18°

Physical characteristics
- Mean diameter: 11.769±0.057 km
- Geometric albedo: 0.039±0.009
- Spectral type: Tholen = FC; B–V = 0.634; U–B = 0.229
- Absolute magnitude (H): 13.5

2278 Götz, provisional designation 1953 GE, is a dark background asteroid from the inner regions of the asteroid belt's background population, approximately 12 kilometers (7.5 miles) in diameter. It was discovered on 7 April 1953, by German astronomer Karl Reinmuth at the Heidelberg Observatory in southwest Germany. The F/C-type asteroid was named after astronomer Paul Götz.

== Orbit and classification ==
Götz is non-family asteroid of the main belt's background population (formerly being classified as a member of the Nysa family by Zappala). It orbits the Sun in the inner main-belt at a distance of 2.1–2.8 AU once every 3 years and 10 months (1,403 days). Its orbit has an eccentricity of 0.15 and an inclination of 4° with respect to the ecliptic.

The body's observation arc begins with its official discovery observation at Heidelberg. Simultaneously, the asteroid was also observed at the Almaty Observatory in Kazakhstan (210).

== Naming ==
This minor planet was named in memory of Paul Götz (1883–1962), a German astronomer and discoverer of minor planets, who was the first assistant of Max Wolf at Heidelberg in the early 1900s, using the observatory's Bruce telescope and 0.15-meter astrograph. The official naming citation was proposed and prepared by G. Klare and L. D. Schmadel and was published by the Minor Planet Center on 27 June 1991 (M.P.C. 18447).

== Physical characteristics ==
In the Tholen classification, the asteroid has an ambiguous spectral type, closest to the F-type and somewhat similar to the carbonaceous C-type asteroid.

=== Diameter and albedo ===
According to the survey carried out by the NEOWISE mission of NASA's Wide-field Infrared Survey Explorer, Götz measures 11.769 kilometers in diameter and its surface has an albedo of 0.039.

=== Rotation period ===
As of 2018, no rotational lightcurve of Götz has been obtained from photometric observations since its discovery in 1953. The asteroid's rotation period, pole and shape remain unknown.
