= Paul Götz =

German astronomer

Minor planets discovered: 20
520 Franziska^{[1]}	October 27, 1903
538 Friederike	July 18, 1904
542 Susanna^{[2]}	August 15, 1904
543 Charlotte	September 11, 1904
544 Jetta	September 11, 1904
545 Messalina	October 3, 1904
546 Herodias	October 10, 1904
547 Praxedis	October 14, 1904
548 Kressida	October 14, 1904
554 Peraga	January 8, 1905
556 Phyllis	January 8, 1905
563 Suleika	April 6, 1905
564 Dudu	May 9, 1905
566 Stereoskopia	May 28, 1905
567 Eleutheria	May 28, 1905
568 Cheruskia	July 26, 1905
571 Dulcinea	September 4, 1905
572 Rebekka	September 19, 1905
576 Emanuela	September 22, 1905
1418 Fayeta	September 22, 1903
^{1} with Max Wolf^{2} with August Kopff

Paul Götz (1883–1962) was a German astronomer and discoverer of 20 minor planets between 1903 and 1905.

He did his Ph.D. dissertation in 1907 at the Landessternwarte Heidelberg-Königstuhl (Königstuhl Observatory, near Heidelberg) at the University of Heidelberg.

At the time, the observatory at Heidelberg was a center for asteroid discovery under the direction of Max Wolf, and several past and future fellow Ph.D.s (Raymond Smith Dugan, Joseph Helffrich, Franz Kaiser, Karl Reinmuth, Emil Ernst, Alfred Bohrmann) made a number of asteroid discoveries. Thus the asteroid discoveries by "P. Gotz" at Heidelberg in this time frame are undoubtedly identified with the Paul Götz who got his Ph.D. in 1907.

The main-belt asteroid 2278 Götz was named in his memory in 1991 (M.P.C. 18447).
