= 543 Charlotte =

Minor planet asteroid

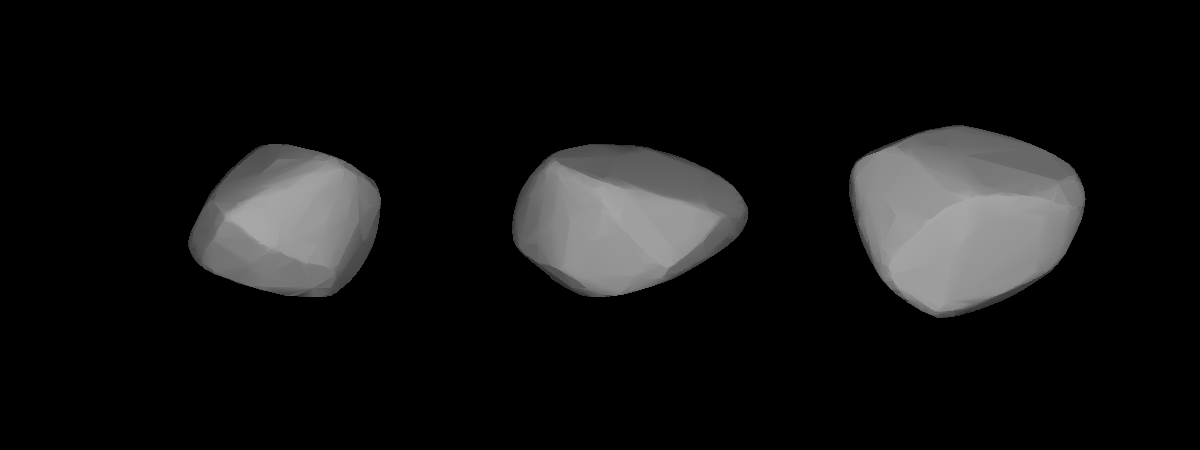
- A three-dimensional model of 543 Charlotte based on its light curve

Discovery
- Discovered by: Paul Götz
- Discovery site: Heidelberg
- Discovery date: 11 September 1904

Designations
- Alternative designations: 1904 OT

Orbital characteristics
- Epoch 31 July 2016 (JD 2457600.5)
- Uncertainty parameter 0
- Observation arc: 111.56 yr (40747 d)
- Aphelion: 3.5311 AU (528.25 Gm)
- Perihelion: 2.5858 AU (386.83 Gm)
- Semi-major axis: 3.0585 AU (457.55 Gm)
- Eccentricity: 0.15453
- Orbital period (sidereal): 5.35 yr (1953.7 d)
- Mean anomaly: 291.152°
- Mean motion: 0° 11^{m} 3.372^{s} / day
- Inclination: 8.4782°
- Longitude of ascending node: 294.981°
- Argument of perihelion: 109.558°

Physical characteristics
- Mean radius: 17.185±1.3 km
- Synodic rotation period: 10.718 h (0.4466 d)
- Geometric albedo: 0.2599±0.044
- Absolute magnitude (H): 9.40

543 Charlotte is a minor planet orbiting the Sun. It was discovered by Paul Götz on September 11, 1904, in Heidelberg.
