= 576 Emanuela =

Main-belt asteroid

Discovery
- Discovered by: Paul Götz
- Discovery site: Heidelberg
- Discovery date: 22 September 1905

Designations
- Alternative designations: 1905 RF

Orbital characteristics
- Epoch 31 July 2016 (JD 2457600.5)
- Uncertainty parameter 0
- Observation arc: 92.12 yr (33646 d)
- Aphelion: 3.5691 AU (533.93 Gm)
- Perihelion: 2.4078 AU (360.20 Gm)
- Semi-major axis: 2.9884 AU (447.06 Gm)
- Eccentricity: 0.19430
- Orbital period (sidereal): 5.17 yr (1887.0 d)
- Mean anomaly: 188.358°
- Mean motion: 0° 11^{m} 26.808^{s} / day
- Inclination: 10.217°
- Longitude of ascending node: 299.933°
- Argument of perihelion: 26.408°

Physical characteristics
- Mean radius: 42.34±2.2 km
- Synodic rotation period: 8.192 h (0.3413 d)
- Geometric albedo: 0.0428±0.005
- Absolute magnitude (H): 9.4

576 Emanuela is an asteroid orbiting the Sun.
