= 554 Peraga =

Minor planet orbiting the Sun

Discovery
- Discovered by: Paul Götz
- Discovery site: Heidelberg
- Discovery date: 8 January 1905

Designations
- Pronunciation: Italian: [peˈraːɡa]
- Alternative designations: 1905 PS

Orbital characteristics
- Epoch 31 July 2016 (JD 2457600.5)
- Uncertainty parameter 0
- Observation arc: 115.51 yr (42190 d)
- Aphelion: 2.7391 AU (409.76 Gm)
- Perihelion: 2.0095 AU (300.62 Gm)
- Semi-major axis: 2.3743 AU (355.19 Gm)
- Eccentricity: 0.15364
- Orbital period (sidereal): 3.66 yr (1336.3 d)
- Mean anomaly: 215.70°
- Mean motion: 0° 16^{m} 9.84^{s} / day
- Inclination: 2.9349°
- Longitude of ascending node: 295.434°
- Argument of perihelion: 127.356°

Physical characteristics
- Mean diameter: 96.65±1.19 km (composite estimate); 95.87±4.1 km
- Mass: (5.86 ± 2.18) × 10^{17} kg (composite estimate) (1.17±0.12)×10^{18} kg (Note: Calculated from its standard gravitational parameter GM = 0.078±0.008 km^{3}/s^{2}.)
- Mean density: 1.24 ± 0.46 g/cm^{3} 2.54 g/cm^{3} (Note: Assuming a diameter of 95.9 km.)
- Synodic rotation period: 13.7128 h (0.57137 d)
- Geometric albedo: 0.0496±0.005
- Absolute magnitude (H): 9.28

554 Peraga is a minor planet orbiting the Sun that was discovered by German astronomer Paul Götz on January 8, 1905, from Heidelberg.

13-cm radar observations of this asteroid from the Arecibo Observatory between 1980 and 1985 were used to produce a diameter estimate of 101 km.
