= 564 Dudu =

Main-belt asteroid

Discovery
- Discovered by: Paul Götz
- Discovery site: Heidelberg
- Discovery date: 9 May 1905

Designations
- Pronunciation: German: [ˈduːduː]
- Alternative designations: 1905 QM

Orbital characteristics
- Epoch 31 July 2016 (JD 2457600.5)
- Uncertainty parameter 0
- Observation arc: 101.79 yr (37178 d)
- Aphelion: 3.5071 AU (524.65 Gm)
- Perihelion: 1.9857 AU (297.06 Gm)
- Semi-major axis: 2.7464 AU (410.86 Gm)
- Eccentricity: 0.27697
- Orbital period (sidereal): 4.55 yr (1662.4 d)
- Mean anomaly: 106.652°
- Mean motion: 0° 12^{m} 59.58^{s} / day
- Inclination: 17.990°
- Longitude of ascending node: 70.761°
- Argument of perihelion: 215.026°

Physical characteristics
- Mean radius: 24.785±2.45 km
- Synodic rotation period: 8.882 h (0.3701 d)
- Geometric albedo: 0.0484±0.011
- Absolute magnitude (H): 10.43

564 Dudu is a minor planet orbiting the Sun. It was discovered 9 May 1905 by German astronomer Paul Götz at Heidelberg, and was named for a female character in the novel Thus Spoke Zarathustra by Friedrich Nietzsche. Based on observations made with the IRAS, 564 Dudu has a diameter of 49.57 ± 4.9 km, a geometric albedo of 0.0484 ± 0.011, and an absolute magnitude (H-value) of 10.43.
