= 520 Franziska =

Main-belt asteroid

Discovery
- Discovered by: M. F. Wolf; P. Götz
- Discovery site: Heidelberg Obs.
- Discovery date: 27 October 1903

Designations
- Pronunciation: German: [fʁanˈtsɪskaː]
- Named after: unknown (Franziska)
- Alternative designations: 1903 MV · A924 WH
- Minor planet category: main-belt · (outer); Eos

Orbital characteristics
- Epoch 4 September 2017 (JD 2458000.5)
- Uncertainty parameter 0
- Observation arc: 112.81 yr (41,205 days)
- Aphelion: 3.3354 AU
- Perihelion: 2.6735 AU
- Semi-major axis: 3.0044 AU
- Eccentricity: 0.1102
- Orbital period (sidereal): 5.21 yr (1,902 days)
- Mean anomaly: 291.42°
- Mean motion: 0° 11^{m} 21.48^{s} / day
- Inclination: 10.960°
- Longitude of ascending node: 34.295°
- Argument of perihelion: 21.772°

Physical characteristics
- Dimensions: 25.261±0.188 km 26.022±0.267 km 27.70±0.61 km 28.61 km (derived); 28.67±1.2 km
- Synodic rotation period: 14.0 h (superseded); 16.5044±0.0001 h 16.5045±0.0005 h 16.507±0.001 h
- Geometric albedo: 0.1143 (derived); 0.1226±0.011; 0.135±0.007; 0.1390±0.0117; 0.147±0.030
- Spectral type: Tholen = CGU; B–V = 0.738
- Absolute magnitude (H): 10.61 · 10.69

520 Franziska, provisional designation 1903 MV, is an Eoan asteroid from the outer regions of the asteroid belt, approximately 27 kilometers in diameter. It was discovered on 27 October 1903, by astronomers Max Wolf and Paul Götz at the Heidelberg-Königstuhl State Observatory in southwest Germany. The origin of the asteroid's name is unknown.

== Orbit and classification ==
Franziska is a member the Eos family (606), the largest outer-belt asteroid family consisting of nearly 10,000 known members. It orbits the Sun at a distance of 2.7–3.3 AU once every 5 years and 3 months (1,902 days). Its orbit has an eccentricity of 0.11 and an inclination of 11° with respect to the ecliptic. The body's observation arc begins one day after its official discovery observation at Heidelberg.

== Physical characteristics ==
In the Tholen classification, Franziska's spectral type is ambiguous. It is closest to a common C-type, and somewhat similar to the rare and also carbonaceous G-type asteroids (CG). The spectrum has also been labelled as "unusual" by Tholen (U). For a carbonaceous asteroid, it has a relatively high albedo (see below).

=== Rotation period ===
In December 2013, a rotational lightcurve of Franziska was obtained from photometric observations by American astronomer Frederick Pilcher at the Organ Mesa Observatory (G50) in New Mexico. Lightcurve analysis gave a well-defined rotation period of 16.507 hours with a brightness variation of 0.35 magnitude (U=3). The result supersedes Richard Binzel's previously obtained lightcurve from May 1985, which gave a period of 14.0 hours and an amplitude of 0.53 magnitude (U=2).

=== Poles ===
Two lightcurves, published in 2016, using modeled photometric data from the Lowell Photometric Database (LPD) and other sources, gave a concurring period of 16.5044 and 16.5045 hours, respectively. Each modeled lightcurve also determined two spin axes of (122.0°, −50.0°) and (301.0°, −59.0°), as well as (282.0°, −79.0°) and (114.0°, −45.0°) in ecliptic coordinates (λ, β), respectively.

=== Diameter and albedo ===
According to the surveys carried out by the Infrared Astronomical Satellite IRAS, the Japanese Akari satellite and the NEOWISE mission of NASA's Wide-field Infrared Survey Explorer, Franziska measures between 25.261 and 28.67 kilometers in diameter and its surface has an albedo between 0.1226 and 0.147.

The Collaborative Asteroid Lightcurve Link derives an albedo of 0.1143 and a diameter of 28.61 kilometers based on an absolute magnitude of 10.69.

== Naming ==
Any reference of this minor planet's name to a person or occurrence is unknown. "Franziska" is a common German female name and was proposed by the second discoverer Paul Götz in 1905 (AN 169, 363).

=== Unknown meaning ===
Among the many thousands of named minor planets, Franziska is one of 120 asteroids, for which no official naming citation has been published. All of these low-numbered asteroids have numbers between 164 Eva and 1514 Ricouxa and were discovered between 1876 and the 1930s, predominantly by astronomers Auguste Charlois, Johann Palisa, Max Wolf and Karl Reinmuth.
