= 567 Eleutheria =

Main-belt asteroid

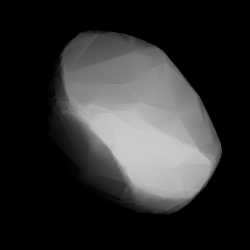
- Shape of Eleutheria from modeled lightcurve

Discovery
- Discovered by: Paul Götz
- Discovery site: Heidelberg
- Discovery date: 28 May 1905

Designations
- Pronunciation: /ɛljuːˈθɪəriə/
- Alternative designations: 1905 QP

Orbital characteristics
- Epoch 31 July 2016 (JD 2457600.5)
- Uncertainty parameter 0
- Observation arc: 110.89 yr (40504 d)
- Aphelion: 3.4182 AU (511.36 Gm)
- Perihelion: 2.8471 AU (425.92 Gm)
- Semi-major axis: 3.1327 AU (468.65 Gm)
- Eccentricity: 0.091156
- Orbital period (sidereal): 5.54 yr (2025.2 d)
- Mean anomaly: 61.183°
- Mean motion: 0° 10^{m} 39.936^{s} / day
- Inclination: 9.2562°
- Longitude of ascending node: 58.278°
- Argument of perihelion: 133.321°

Physical characteristics
- Mean radius: 46.705±1.1 km
- Synodic rotation period: 7.717 h (0.3215 d)
- Geometric albedo: 0.0439±0.002
- Absolute magnitude (H): 9.16

567 Eleutheria is a minor planet orbiting the Sun.

Photometric observations of this asteroid made during 2010 showed a rotation period of 7.718±0.001 h with a brightness variation of 0.34±0.02 in magnitude.
