= 542 Susanna =

Main-belt asteroid

Discovery
- Discovered by: Paul Götz; August Kopff
- Discovery site: Heidelberg
- Discovery date: 15 August 1904

Designations
- Alternative designations: 1904 OQ

Orbital characteristics
- Epoch 31 July 2016 (JD 2457600.5)
- Uncertainty parameter 0
- Observation arc: 111.66 yr (40784 d)
- Aphelion: 3.3156 AU (496.01 Gm)
- Perihelion: 2.5011 AU (374.16 Gm)
- Semi-major axis: 2.9084 AU (435.09 Gm)
- Eccentricity: 0.14003
- Orbital period (sidereal): 4.96 yr (1811.7 d)
- Mean anomaly: 197.019°
- Mean motion: 0° 11^{m} 55.356^{s} / day
- Inclination: 12.076°
- Longitude of ascending node: 152.993°
- Argument of perihelion: 216.495°

Physical characteristics
- Mean radius: 20.785±0.5 km
- Mass: (5.8±2.2)×10^{17} kg (Note: Calculated from its standard gravitational parameter GM = 0.039±0.015 km^{3}/s^{2}.)
- Mean density: 15.12 g/cm^{3} (Note: Assuming a diameter of 42.1 km.)
- Synodic rotation period: 10.069 h (0.4195 d)
- Geometric albedo: 0.1843±0.009
- Absolute magnitude (H): 9.36

542 Susanna is a minor planet orbiting the Sun.
