= 731 Sorga =

Highly elongated background asteroid

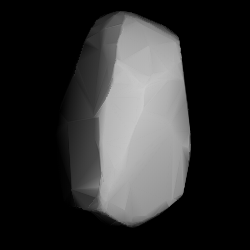
- Modelled shape of Sorga from its lightcurve

Discovery
- Discovered by: A. Massinger
- Discovery site: Heidelberg Obs.
- Discovery date: 15 April 1912

Designations
- Named after: "the heavens" (Indonesian language)
- Alternative designations: A912 GH · 1940 WP; 1912 OQ
- Minor planet category: main-belt · (outer); background

Orbital characteristics
- Epoch 31 May 2020 (JD 2459000.5)
- Uncertainty parameter 0
- Observation arc: 104.24 yr (38,075 d)
- Aphelion: 3.4090 AU
- Perihelion: 2.5656 AU
- Semi-major axis: 2.9873 AU
- Eccentricity: 0.1412
- Orbital period (sidereal): 5.16 yr (1,886 d)
- Mean anomaly: 201.03°
- Mean motion: 0° 11^{m} 27.24^{s} / day
- Inclination: 10.689°
- Longitude of ascending node: 46.136°
- Argument of perihelion: 288.62°

Physical characteristics
- Mean diameter: 34.597±0.409 km; 38.93±0.44 km; 41.78±2.0 km
- Synodic rotation period: 8.184±0.005 h
- Pole ecliptic latitude: (83.0°, 40.0°) (λ_{1}/β_{1}); (275.0°, 21.0°) (λ_{2}/β_{2})
- Geometric albedo: 0.1436±0.015; 0.173±0.005; 0.209±0.042
- Spectral type: Tholen = CD; SMASS = Xe; B–V = 0.691±0.030; U–B = 0.312±0.028
- Absolute magnitude (H): 9.62; 9.7

731 Sorga (prov. designation: A912 GH or 1912 OQ) is a highly elongated background asteroid from the outer regions of the asteroid belt, approximately 38 kilometers (24 miles) in diameter. It was discovered on 15 April 1912, by German astronomer Adam Massinger at the Heidelberg-Königstuhl State Observatory in southwest Germany. The C-type (CD) and X-type asteroid (Xe) has a rotation period of 8.2 hours. It was named Sorga, meaning "the heavens" in the Indonesian language.

== Orbit and classification ==
Sorga is a non-family asteroid of the main belt's background population when applying the hierarchical clustering method to its proper orbital elements. It orbits the Sun in the outer asteroid belt at a distance of 2.6–3.4 AU once every 5 years and 2 months (1,886 days; semi-major axis of 2.99 AU). Its orbit has an eccentricity of 0.14 and an inclination of 11° with respect to the ecliptic. The body's observation arc begins at Heidelberg Observatory on 21 October 1919, more than seven years after its official discovery observation.

== Naming ==
This minor planet was named Sorga, the word for "the heavens" in the Indonesian language, also transliterated as "surga". The naming was not mentioned in The Names of the Minor Planets by Paul Herget.

== Physical characteristics ==
In the Tholen classification, Sorga is closest to a common, carbonaceous C-type asteroid and somewhat similar to a dark D-type asteroid (CD), while in the Bus–Binzel SMASS classification, it is an Xe-subtype which transitions from the X-type to the bright E-type. Sorga has also been classified as a metallic M-type asteroid.

=== Rotation period and poles ===
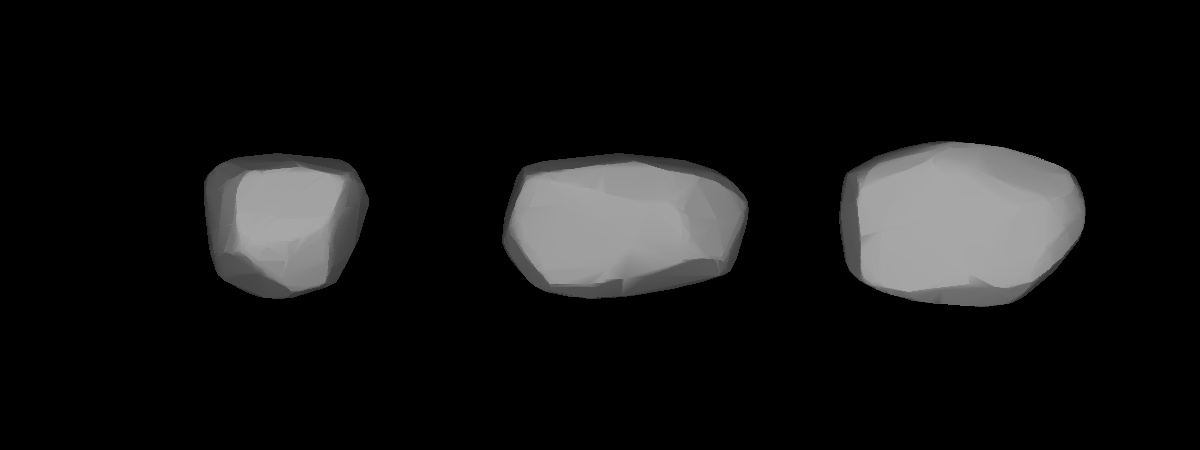
Lightcurve-based 3D shape model of Sorga

In April 2005, a rotational lightcurve of Sorga was obtained from photometric observations by Brian Warner at his Palmer Divide Observatory (716) in Colorado. Analysis gave a classically shaped bimodal lightcurve with a well-defined rotation period of (8.184±0.005) hours and a high brightness variation of (0.52±0.02) magnitude, indicative of its elongated shape (U=3). In February 2009, Warner revisited Sorga and determined a very similar period of (8.192±0.002) hours though with a much lower amplitude of (0.19±0.02) magnitude (U=3). (Note: Lightcurve plot of (731) Sorga, Palmer Divide Observatory, B. D. Warner (2009). Rotation period of 8.192±0.002 hours with a brightness amplitude of 0.19±0.02 mag. Quality code is 3. Summary figures at the LCDB.)

In January 2010, astronomers at the Palomar Transient Factory measured a period of 8.188±0.0023 hours with an amplitude of 0.72 magnitude (U=2). Additional observations by Christophe Demeautis in September 2017, and by Bruno Christmann in April 2020, gave a period of (8.186±0.003) and (8.1865±0.0003) hours with an amplitude of 0.54±0.02 and 0.57±0.02 magnitude, respectively (U=3–/3).

In 2016, a modeled lightcurve rendered a concurring sidereal period of 8.18633±0.00002 hours using data from the Uppsala Asteroid Photometric Catalogue, the Palomar Transient Factory survey, and individual observers, as well as sparse-in-time photometry from the NOFS, the Catalina Sky Survey, and the La Palma surveys (950). The study also determined two spin axes of (83.0°, 40.0°) and (275.0°, 21.0°) in ecliptic coordinates (λ, β).

=== Diameter and albedo ===
According to the surveys carried out by the NEOWISE mission of NASA's Wide-field Infrared Survey Explorer (WISE), the Japanese Akari satellite, and the Infrared Astronomical Satellite IRAS, Sorga measures (34.597±0.409), (38.93±0.44) and (41.78±2.0) kilometers in diameter and its surface has an albedo of (0.209±0.042), (0.173±0.005) and (0.1436±0.015), respectively. The Collaborative Asteroid Lightcurve Link derives an albedo of 0.1339 and a diameter of 41.70 kilometers based on an absolute magnitude of 9.7. The WISE team also published an alternative mean-diameter of (31.955±0.293 km) with an albedo of (0.2605±0.0759).

Two asteroid occultations on 24 October 2007, and on 31 October 2012, gave a best-fit ellipse dimension of (45.7 km × 45.7 km) and (38.0 km × 38.0 km), with an intermediate and low quality rating of 2 and 1, respectively. These timed observations are taken when the asteroid passes in front of a distant star.
