= 838 Seraphina =

Main-belt asteroid

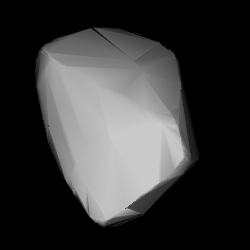
- Shape of Seraphina from modeled lightcurve

Discovery
- Discovered by: M. F. Wolf
- Discovery site: Heidelberg Obs.
- Discovery date: 24 September 1916

Designations
- Named after: unknown
- Alternative designations: A916 SL · 1916 AH; 2019 FC_{5}
- Minor planet category: main-belt · (outer); background

Orbital characteristics
- Epoch 31 May 2020 (JD 2459000.5)
- Uncertainty parameter 0
- Observation arc: 103.28 yr (37,724 d)
- Aphelion: 3.2777 AU
- Perihelion: 2.5189 AU
- Semi-major axis: 2.8983 AU
- Eccentricity: 0.1309
- Orbital period (sidereal): 4.93 yr (1,802 d)
- Mean anomaly: 15.248°
- Mean motion: 0° 11^{m} 59.28^{s} / day
- Inclination: 10.423°
- Longitude of ascending node: 240.05°
- Argument of perihelion: 117.10°

Physical characteristics
- Mean diameter: 49.36±0.78 km; 58.095±0.496 km; 59.81±2.3 km
- Synodic rotation period: 15.67±0.02 h
- Pole ecliptic latitude: (18.0°, 4.0°) (λ_{1}/β_{1}) (192.0°, 32.0°) (λ_{2}/β_{2})
- Geometric albedo: 0.0455±0.004; 0.048±0.008; 0.068±0.002
- Spectral type: Tholen = P; X (S3OS2); B–V = 0.703±0.016; U–B = 0.324±0.023
- Absolute magnitude (H): 10.1

838 Seraphina (prov. designation: A916 SL or 1916 AH) is a dark and large background asteroid, approximately 58 kilometers (36 miles) in diameter, located in the outer regions of the asteroid belt. It was discovered by German astronomer Max Wolf at the Heidelberg-Königstuhl State Observatory on 24 September 1916. The primitive P-type asteroid has a rotation period of 15.7 hours and is rather spherical in shape. Any reference to the origin of the asteroid's name is unknown.

== Orbit and classification ==
Seraphina is a non-family asteroid of the main belt's background population when applying the hierarchical clustering method to its proper orbital elements. It orbits the Sun in the outer asteroid belt at a distance of 2.5–3.3 AU once every 4 years and 11 months (1,802 days; semi-major axis of 2.9 AU). Its orbit has an eccentricity of 0.13 and an inclination of 10° with respect to the ecliptic. The body's observation arc begins with its official discovery observation at Heidelberg Observatory on 24 September 1916.

== Naming ==
Any reference of this minor planet's name to a person or occurrence is unknown.

=== Unknown meaning ===
Among the many thousands of named minor planets, Seraphina is one of 120 asteroids for which no official naming citation has been published. All of these asteroids have low numbers in between 164 Eva and 1514 Ricouxa and were discovered from 1876 up to the 1930s, predominantly by astronomers Auguste Charlois, Johann Palisa, Max Wolf and Karl Reinmuth.

== Physical characteristics ==
In the Tholen classification, Seraphina is a very dark, primitive P-type asteroid, that falls into the wider group of the carbonaceous C-Complex. In both the Tholen- and SMASS-like taxonomy of the Small Solar System Objects Spectroscopic Survey (S3OS2), it is an X-type asteroid. P-type asteroids are common in the outer asteroid belt and among the Jupiter trojans.

=== Rotation period ===
In November 2005, a rotational lightcurve of Seraphina was obtained from photometric observations by French amateur astronomer Raymond Poncy. Lightcurve analysis gave a rotation period of 15.67±0.02 hours with a low brightness variation of 0.07±0.01 magnitude, indicative of a rather spherical shape (U=2). Other observations include a period of 16.2 hours with an amplitude of 0.30 magnitude by Richard Binzel from June 1984 (U=2), and a period of 17.62±0.01 hours with an amplitude of 0.13±0.03 magnitude by the Spanish group of asteroid observers, OBAS, in November 2015 (U=2).

In 2018, Czech astronomers Josef Ďurech and Josef Hanuš published a modeled lightcurve using photometric data from the Gaia spacecraft's second data release. It showed a sidereal period of 11.7245±0.0002 hours (U=2), and gave two spin axes at (18.0°, 4.0°) and (192.0°, 32.0°) in ecliptic coordinates (λ, β).

=== Diameter and albedo ===
According to the surveys carried out by the Japanese Akari satellite, the NEOWISE mission of NASA's Wide-field Infrared Survey Explorer (WISE), and the Infrared Astronomical Satellite IRAS, Seraphina measures (49.36±0.78), (58.095±0.496) and (59.81±2.3) kilometers in diameter and its surface has an albedo of (0.068±0.002), (0.048±0.008) and (0.0455±0.004), respectively. The Collaborative Asteroid Lightcurve Link derives an albedo of 0.0427 and a diameter of 59.75 kilometers based on an absolute magnitude of 10.16. Alternative mean-diameter measurements published by the WISE team include (43.24±13.99 km), (48.861±11.16 km) and (65.33±0.24 km) with corresponding albedos of (0.04), (0.062±0.081) and (0.0820±0.0418).

Two asteroid occultations of Seraphina gave a best-fit ellipse dimension of (60.0 km × 60.0 km) and (49.0 km × 49.0 km) for their respective observation on 5 February 2007 and on 20 July 2014. These timed observations are taken when the asteroid passes in front of a distant star. However, these two observations have received a poor quality rating.
