= 572 Rebekka =

Minor planet orbiting the Sun

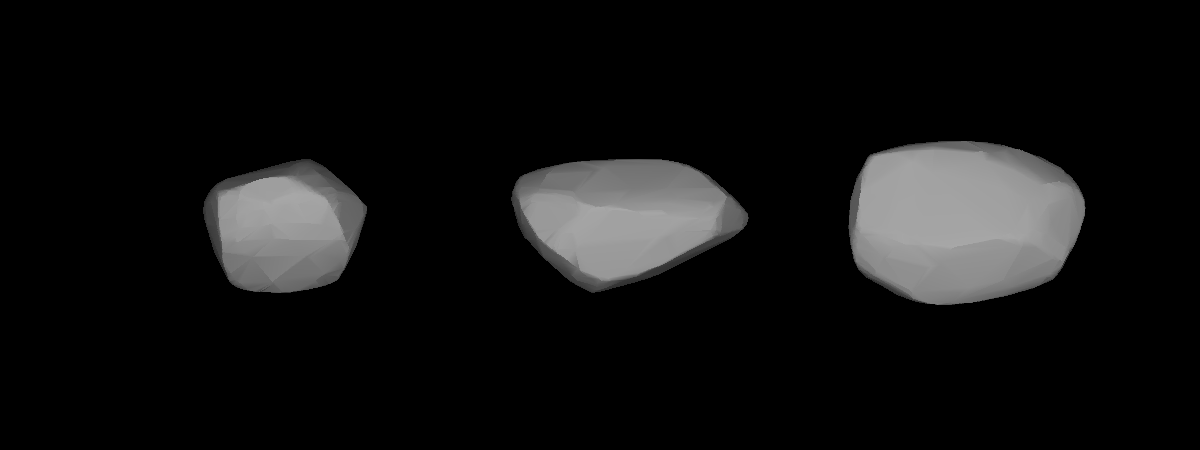
- A three-dimensional model of 572 Rebekka based on its light curve

Discovery
- Discovered by: Paul Götz
- Discovery site: Heidelberg
- Discovery date: 19 September 1905

Designations
- Pronunciation: /rɪˈbɛkə/ German: [ʁeːˈbɛkaː]
- Alternative designations: 1905 RB

Orbital characteristics
- Epoch 31 July 2016 (JD 2457600.5)
- Uncertainty parameter 0
- Observation arc: 109.81 yr (40108 d)
- Aphelion: 2.7789 AU (415.72 Gm)
- Perihelion: 2.0213 AU (302.38 Gm)
- Semi-major axis: 2.4001 AU (359.05 Gm)
- Eccentricity: 0.15782
- Orbital period (sidereal): 3.72 yr (1358.1 d)
- Mean anomaly: 272.796°
- Mean motion: 0° 15^{m} 54.252^{s} / day
- Inclination: 10.580°
- Longitude of ascending node: 194.566°
- Argument of perihelion: 192.111°

Physical characteristics
- Mean diameter: 27 ± 3 km (composite estimate)
- Synodic rotation period: 5.6497 h (0.23540 d)
- Geometric albedo: 0.10 ± 0.01
- Absolute magnitude (H): 10.94

572 Rebekka is a minor planet orbiting the Sun, which was discovered on September 19, 1905, by a German astronomer Paul Götz in Heidelberg. It was named after a young lady from Heidelberg, and may have been inspired by the asteroid's provisional designation 1905 RB.

Observations performed at the Palmer Divide Observatory in Colorado Springs, Colorado during 2007 produced a light curve with a period of 5.656 ± 0.002 hours with a brightness range of 0.40 ± 0.02 in magnitude. This agrees with the 5.65 hour period measured in 1998.
