= Beiyou 572-class replenishment oiler =

Class of a Chinese naval auxiliary ship

Class overview
- Name: Beiyou 572
- Operators: People's Liberation Army Navy
- Completed: 4
- Active: 4

General characteristics
- Class & type: Beiyou 572
- Electronic warfare & decoys: None
- Armament: Unarmed
- Aircraft carried: None
- Aviation facilities: None

The Beiyou 572 class oil tanker is a class of naval auxiliary ship currently in service with the People's Liberation Army Navy (PLAN). The name of this class is after the first unit commissioned, with the exact type still remains unknown, and a total of four of this class have been confirmed in active service as of mid-2010s.

Beiyou 572 class series ships in PLAN service are designated by a combination of two Chinese characters followed by three-digit number. The second Chinese character is You (油), meaning oil in Chinese, because these ships are classified as oil tankers. The first Chinese character denotes which fleet the ship is service with, with East (Dong, 东) for East Sea Fleet, North (Bei, 北) for North Sea Fleet, and South (Nan, 南) for South Sea Fleet. However, the pennant numbers may have changed due to the change of Chinese naval ships naming convention.

Class	Pennant #	Status	Fleet
Beiyou 572 class	Bei-You 572	Active	North Sea Fleet
Beiyou 572 class	Dong-You 633	Active	East Sea Fleet
Beiyou 572 class	Dong-You 636	Active	East Sea Fleet
Beiyou 572 class	Nan-You 976	Active	South Sea Fleet
