= E572 =

E572 may refer to:

- Calcium stearate
- Magnesium stearate
- European route E572, a route in Slovakia
