= 566 Stereoskopia =

Main-belt asteroid

Discovery
- Discovered by: Paul Götz
- Discovery site: Heidelberg
- Discovery date: 28 May 1905

Designations
- Pronunciation: /ˌstɛrioʊˈskoʊpiə/
- Alternative designations: 1905 QO

Orbital characteristics
- Epoch 31 July 2016 (JD 2457600.5)
- Uncertainty parameter 0
- Observation arc: 1,687.12 d (40,491 h)
- Aphelion: 3.7804 AU (565.54 Gm)
- Perihelion: 2.9908 AU (447.42 Gm)
- Semi-major axis: 3.3856 AU (506.48 Gm)
- Eccentricity: 0.11662
- Orbital period (sidereal): 6.23 yr (2,275.4 d)
- Mean anomaly: 177.298°
- Mean motion: 0° 9^{m} 29.592^{s} / day
- Inclination: 4.8864°
- Longitude of ascending node: 79.644°
- Argument of perihelion: 298.527°

Physical characteristics
- Mean diameter: 148 ± 8/11 km
- Mass: (2.76±0.52)×10^{18} kg (Note: Calculated from its standard gravitational parameter GM = 0.184±0.035 km^{3}/s^{2}.)
- Mean density: 1.62 g/cm^{3} (calculated)
- Synodic rotation period: 12.08466 ± 0.00006 h 12.08463 ± 0.00003 h (alternate pole solution)
- Pole ecliptic longitude: 164° ± 15° 338° ± 9° (alternate pole solution)
- Pole ecliptic latitude: −2° ± 2° −13° ± 2° (alternate pole solution)
- Geometric albedo: 0.0383±0.003
- Absolute magnitude (H): 8.0

566 Stereoskopia is a large, outer main-belt asteroid orbiting the Sun. It was discovered on 28 May 1905 from Heidelberg by German astronomer Paul Götz. The discovery was made from photographic plates with the use of a stereo-comparator that had been provided by Carl Pulfrich, a German physicist at the Carl Zeiss Company. The asteroid name is a reference to this device.

This object is a member of the Cybele group located beyond the core of the main belt. It is orbiting at a distance of 3.39 AU with a period of 6.23 yr and an eccentricity of 0.12. The orbital plane is inclined at an angle of 4.9° to the plane of the ecliptic. Light curve analysis based on photometric data collected during 2008 provide a rotation period of 12.103±0.002 h for this asteroid. It has a diameter of approximately 167 km and is classified as a carbonaceous C-type asteroid.

== See also ==
- Minor planet groups
