= USS LST-572 =

1944 LST-542-class tank landing ship

History

United States
- Name: LST-572
- Builder: Missouri Valley Bridge and Iron Company, Evansville, Indiana
- Laid down: 15 April 1944
- Launched: 29 May 1944
- Sponsored by: Mrs. B. B. Dumville
- Commissioned: 19 June 1944
- Decommissioned: 8 March 1946

History
- Operator: Commander Naval Forces Far East
- In service: date unknown
- Out of service: date unknown
- Renamed: Q090

History
- Operator: Military Sea Transportation Service (MSTS)
- In service: 31 March 1952
- Reclassified: USNS T-LST-572
- Stricken: 15 June 1973
- Identification: Hull symbol:LST-572; Hull symbol:T-LST-572; Code letters:NEWQ
- Honors and awards: 1 × battle stars
- Fate: Sold, 19 November 1973

General characteristics
- Class & type: LST-542-class tank landing ship
- Displacement: 1,625 long tons (1,651 t) (light); 4,080 long tons (4,145 t) (full (seagoing draft with 1,675 short tons (1,520 t) load)
- Length: 328 ft (100 m) oa
- Beam: 50 ft (15 m)
- Draft: Unloaded: 2 ft 4 in (0.71 m) forward; 7 ft 6 in (2.29 m) aft; Full load: 8 ft 2 in (2.49 m) forward; 14 ft 1 in (4.29 m) aft; Landing with 500 short tons (450 t) load: 3 ft 11 in (1.19 m) forward; 9 ft 10 in (3.00 m) aft
- Installed power: 2 × 900 hp (670 kW) General Motors 12-567A diesel engines, 1,700 shp (1,300 kW)
- Propulsion: 1 × Falk main reduction gears; 2 × screws
- Speed: 12 kn (22 km/h; 14 mph)
- Range: 24,000 nmi (44,000 km; 28,000 mi) at 9 kn (17 km/h; 10 mph) while displacing 3,960 long tons (4,024 t)
- Boats & landing craft carried: 2 x LCVPs
- Capacity: 1,600–1,900 st (22,000–27,000 lb; 10,000–12,000 kg) cargo depending on mission
- Troops: 16 officers, 147 enlisted men
- Complement: 13 officers, 104 enlisted men
- Armament: 2 × twin 40 mm (1.6 in) Bofors guns; 4 × single 40mm Bofors guns; 12 × 20 mm (0.79 in) Oerlikon cannons

Service record
- Operations: Battle of Okinawa (10 May–29 June 1945)
- Awards: American Campaign Medal; European–African–Middle Eastern Campaign Medal; Asiatic–Pacific Campaign Medal; World War II Victory Medal; Navy Occupation Service Medal w/Asia Clasp; National Defense Service Medal; Vietnam Service Medal; Philippine Liberation Medal; Republic of Vietnam Campaign Medal

USS LST-572 was a United States Navy LST-542-class tank landing ship used in the Asiatic-Pacific Theater during World War II.

== Construction and commissioning ==
LST-572 was laid down on 15 April 1944 at Evansville, Indiana, by the Missouri Valley Bridge and Iron Company. She was launched on 29 May 1944, sponsored by Mrs. B. B. Dumville, and commissioned on 19 June 1944.

== Service history ==
During the war, LST-572 was first assigned to the Europe-Africa-Middle East Theater as part of convoy HX 301, leaving New York City, 25 July 1944 and arriving in Liverpool, 8 August 1944.

On 24 December 1944, LST-572 left Guantanamo, Cuba, with Convoy GZ 111 and arrived in Cristóbal, Colónl, on 27 December 1944.

She was later reassigned to the Pacific Theater of Operations. She took part in the Battle of Okinawa in May and June 1945.

Following the war, LST-572 performed occupation duty in the Far East until early March 1946.

LST-572 was decommissioned on 8 March 1946 and transferred to the Military Sea Transportation Service on 31 March 1952 where she operated as USNS LST-572. She was struck from the Navy list on 15 June 1973 and sold on 19 November that same year to Yi Ho Enterprise Corp.

== Honors and awards ==
LST-572 earned one battle stars for her World War II service.

== Notes ==
Citations

== Bibliography ==
Online sources

- "LST-572". Dictionary of American Naval Fighting Ships. Naval History and Heritage Command.
- "USS LST-572". NavSource. 19 December 2014.
- "Convoy HX.301". Arnold Hague Convoy Database.
- "Convoy GZ.111". Arnold Hague Convoy Database.
