= 563 Suleika =

Main-belt asteroid

Discovery
- Discovered by: Paul Götz
- Discovery date: 6 April 1905

Designations
- Pronunciation: German: [zuːlaɪkaː]
- Alternative designations: 1905 QK
- Minor planet category: Main belt

Orbital characteristics
- Epoch 31 July 2016 (JD 2457600.5)
- Uncertainty parameter 0
- Observation arc: 108.45 yr (39611 d)
- Aphelion: 3.3510 AU (501.30 Gm)
- Perihelion: 2.08094 AU (311.304 Gm)
- Semi-major axis: 2.71595 AU (406.300 Gm)
- Eccentricity: 0.23381
- Orbital period (sidereal): 4.48 yr (1634.9 d)
- Mean anomaly: 104.420°
- Mean motion: 0° 13^{m} 12.72^{s} / day
- Inclination: 10.229°
- Longitude of ascending node: 85.266°
- Argument of perihelion: 336.919°

Physical characteristics
- Mean radius: 26.645±0.55 km
- Synodic rotation period: 5.69 h (0.237 d)
- Geometric albedo: 0.2477±0.010
- Temperature: ~169 K
- Spectral type: S
- Absolute magnitude (H): 8.63, 8.50

563 Suleika is a minor planet orbiting the Sun. Previously designated as 1905 QK, it was discovered by German astronomer Paul Götz on 6 April 1905 from Heidelberg, Germany.

The planet was named after a female character in Nietzsche's Also sprach Zarathustra.

Photometric observations of this asteroid at the Oakley Observatory in Terre Haute, Indiana, during 2006 gave a light curve with a period of 5.628 ± 0.002 hours and a brightness variation of 0.28 ± 0.01 in magnitude.
