= 1012 Sarema =

Main-belt asteroid

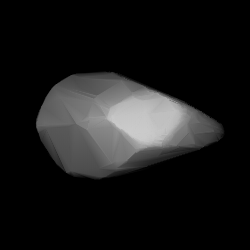
- Modelled shape of Sarema from its lightcurve

Discovery
- Discovered by: K. Reinmuth
- Discovery site: Heidelberg Obs.
- Discovery date: 12 January 1924

Designations
- Named after: Sarema (character in opera/poem)
- Alternative designations: 1924 PM · 1942 VC_{1} 1954 XL · 1954 YF; A907 VQ · A907 WA; A924 AD
- Minor planet category: main-belt · background

Orbital characteristics
- Epoch 23 March 2018 (JD 2458200.5)
- Uncertainty parameter 0
- Observation arc: 110.21 yr (40,255 d)
- Aphelion: 2.8132 AU
- Perihelion: 2.1460 AU
- Semi-major axis: 2.4796 AU
- Eccentricity: 0.1345
- Orbital period (sidereal): 3.90 yr (1,426 d)
- Mean anomaly: 45.983°
- Mean motion: 0° 15^{m} 8.64^{s} / day
- Inclination: 4.0321°
- Longitude of ascending node: 73.188°
- Argument of perihelion: 24.805°

Physical characteristics
- Mean diameter: 17.228±5.264 km
- Synodic rotation period: 10.30708 h
- Geometric albedo: 0.0634±0.0412
- Spectral type: Tholen = F B–V = 0.693; U–B = 0.189
- Absolute magnitude (H): 12.26 · 12.36; 12.41

1012 Sarema (prov. designation: A924 AD or 1924 PM) is a dark background asteroid from the inner regions of the asteroid belt, approximately 20 kilometers (12 miles) kilometers in diameter. It was discovered on 12 January 1924, by German astronomer Karl Reinmuth at the Heidelberg-Königstuhl State Observatory at Heidelberg, Germany. The asteroid has a rotation period of 10.3 hours and probably an elongated shape. It was named after Sarema, a character in the poem The Fountain of Bakhchisaray by Aleksandr Pushkin, and the protagonist of the opera Sarema by Alexander von Zemlinsky based upon it.

== Orbit and classification ==
Sarema orbits the Sun in the inner asteroid belt at a distance of 2.1–2.8 AU once every 3 years and 11 months (1,426 days; semi-major axis of 2.48 AU). Its orbit has an eccentricity of 0.13 and an inclination of 4° with respect to the ecliptic. Sarema is a non-family asteroid of the main belt's background population when applying the hierarchical clustering method to its proper orbital elements.

The body's observation arc begins with its first observation as A907 VQ at Heidelberg in November 1907, more than 16 years prior to its official discovery observation.

== Naming ==
This minor planet was named after a character in a poem by Aleksandr Pushkin, made into the opera Sarema by Alexander von Zemlinsky. The official naming citation was mentioned in The Names of the Minor Planets by Paul Herget in 1955 (H 97). The asteroid's name was suggested by Russian astronomer Nikolaj Komendantov (also see 3958 Komendantov).

== Physical characteristics ==
In the Tholen classification, Sarema is an uncommon F-type asteroid of the carbonaceous C-complex.

=== Rotation period and poles ===
In April 1983, a first rotational lightcurve of Sarema was obtained from photometric observations by American astronomer Richard Binzel. Lightcurve analysis gave a well-defined rotation period of 10.32 hours with a brightness amplitude of 0.81 magnitude (U=3), which is indicative for an elongated, non-spherical shape.

In 2009 and 2011, two modeled lightcurves gave a concurring sidereal period 10.30708 hours, combining sparse and dense photometric data from the Uppsala Asteroid Photometric Catalogue and other sources. The two studies also determined two spin axis of (45.0°, 67.0°) and (253.0°, 63.0°), as well as (51.0°, 64.0°) and (254.0°, 53.0°) in ecliptic coordinates (λ, β), respectively.

=== Diameter and albedo ===
According to the surveys carried out by the Infrared Astronomical Satellite IRAS, the Japanese Akari satellite and the NEOWISE mission of NASA's Wide-field Infrared Survey Explorer, Sarema measures between 16.06 and 22.96 kilometers in diameter and its surface has an albedo between 0.0342 and 0.07. The Collaborative Asteroid Lightcurve Link derives an albedo of 0.045 and a diameter of 21.13 kilometers based on an absolute magnitude of 12.36.
