= Comet Johnson =

Comet Johnson or Johnson's Comet may refer to any of the comets discovered by the following astronomers below:

== Ernest Leonard Johnson ==
Ernest Leonard Johnson discovered four comets between 1935 and 1949:

- 48P/Johnson
- C/1935 A1 (Johnson)
- C/1948 R1 (Johnson)
- C/1949 K1 (Johnson)

== Jess A. Johnson ==
Jess A. Johnson discovered two comets since 2015:

- C/2015 V2 (Johnson)
- C/2018 F3 (Johnson)
