= Comet Wirtanen (disambiguation) =

Comet Wirtanen mostly refers to the periodic comet named 46P/Wirtanen. It may also be referring to any of the four comets below that were also discovered by American astronomer, Carl A. Wirtanen:

- C/1947 O1 (Wirtanen)
- C/1948 N1 (Wirtanen)
- C/1948 T1 (Wirtanen)
- C/1956 F1 (Wirtanen)
