= 1609 Brenda =

Main-belt asteroid

Discovery
- Discovered by: E. L. Johnson
- Discovery site: Johannesburg Obs.
- Discovery date: 10 July 1951

Designations
- Named after: Brenda (discoverer's granddaughter)
- Alternative designations: 1951 NL · 1925 EA; 1934 JB · 1947 WB; 1950 HD · 1954 EP; 1954 HE
- Minor planet category: main-belt · (middle); Gersuind

Orbital characteristics
- Epoch 4 September 2017 (JD 2458000.5)
- Uncertainty parameter 0
- Observation arc: 82.98 yr (30,310 days)
- Aphelion: 3.2255 AU
- Perihelion: 1.9432 AU
- Semi-major axis: 2.5844 AU
- Eccentricity: 0.2481
- Orbital period (sidereal): 4.15 yr (1,518 days)
- Mean anomaly: 309.08°
- Mean motion: 0° 14^{m} 13.92^{s} / day
- Inclination: 18.628°
- Longitude of ascending node: 105.23°
- Argument of perihelion: 229.14°

Physical characteristics
- Dimensions: 26.27±6.75 km 27.96±0.48 km 29.59 km (derived); 29.64±1.7 km (IRAS:6)
- Synodic rotation period: 19.46 h 23±1 h
- Geometric albedo: 0.1078 (derived); 0.1147±0.014 (IRAS:6); 0.13±0.05; 0.133±0.005
- Spectral type: S B–V = 0.860; U–B = 0.390
- Absolute magnitude (H): 10.50 · 10.6 · 10.61 · 10.68

1609 Brenda, provisional designation 1951 NL, is a stony asteroid from the central region of the asteroid belt, approximately 28 kilometers in diameter. It was discovered on 10 July 1951, by South African astronomer Ernest Johnson at the Johannesburg Observatory in South Africa, and named after his granddaughter, Brenda.

== Orbit and classification ==
The S-type asteroid orbits the Sun in the central main-belt at a distance of 1.9–3.2 AU once every 4 years and 2 months (1,518 days). Its orbit has an eccentricity of 0.25 and an inclination of 19° with respect to the ecliptic. Brenda was first identified as 1925 EA at Simeiz Observatory in 1925. Its observation arc begins 17 years prior to its official discovery observation, with its identification 1934 JB, also made at Simeiz.

== Physical characteristics ==
American astronomer Richard Binzel obtained the first rotational lightcurve of Brenda in June 1984. It gave a rotation period of 19.46 hours with a brightness variation of 0.16 magnitude (U=2). In June 2006, a period of 23±1 with an amplitude of 0.26 magnitude was derived from photometric observations made by French amateur astronomer René Roy (U=2).

According to the surveys carried out by the Infrared Astronomical Satellite IRAS, the Japanese Akari satellite, and NASA's Wide-field Infrared Survey Explorer with its subsequent NEOWISE mission, Brenda measures between 26.27 and 29.64 kilometers in diameter, and its surface has an albedo between 0.115 and 0.133. The Collaborative Asteroid Lightcurve Link derives an albedo of 0.1078 and a diameter of 29.59 kilometers with an absolute magnitude of 10.68.

== Naming ==
This minor planet was named by the discoverer for his granddaughter, Brenda. The official naming citation was published by the Minor Planet Center on 20 February 1976 (M.P.C. 3931). Ernest Johnson is also known for the discovery of the periodic comet 48P/Johnson, using the Franklin-Adams Star Camera.
