= 1863 Antinous =

Stony near-Earth asteroid

Discovery
- Discovered by: C. A. Wirtanen
- Discovery site: Lick Obs.
- Discovery date: 7 March 1948

Designations
- Pronunciation: /ænˈtɪnoʊəs/
- Named after: Antinous (Greek mythology)
- Alternative designations: 1948 EA
- Minor planet category: Apollo; NEO

Orbital characteristics
- Epoch 4 September 2017 (JD 2458000.5)
- Uncertainty parameter 0
- Observation arc: 68.91 yr (25,168 days)
- Earliest precovery date: 5 March 1948
- Aphelion: 3.6293 AU
- Perihelion: 0.8895 AU
- Semi-major axis: 2.2594 AU
- Eccentricity: 0.6063
- Orbital period (sidereal): 3.40 yr (1,240 days)
- Mean anomaly: 139.55°
- Mean motion: 0° 17^{m} 24.72^{s} / day
- Inclination: 18.398°
- Longitude of ascending node: 346.48°
- Argument of perihelion: 268.00°
- Earth MOID: 0.1836 AU (71.5 LD)

Physical characteristics
- Dimensions: 1.80 km (derived); 2.1 km (Gehrels); 3.16 km; 3.23 km
- Synodic rotation period: 4.02 h; 4.386±0.004 h; 7.453±0.005 h; 7.4568±0.0017 h (Note: Pravec (1999) web: rotation period 7.4568±0.0017 hours with a brightness amplitude of 0.23 mag, and quality code: n.a.. Summary figures at Collaborative Asteroid Lightcurve Link (CALL) for (1863) Antinous); 7.471±0.005 h (Note: Warner (2016) web: rotation period 7.471±0.005 hours with a brightness amplitude of 0.33 mag, and quality code: 3. Summary figures at Collaborative Asteroid Lightcurve Link (CALL) for (1863) Antinous)
- Geometric albedo: 0.10; 0.11±0.08; 0.24 (Gehrels); 0.29 (derived)
- Spectral type: SU (Tholen); Sq (SMASS); L; SU
- Absolute magnitude (H): 15.00; 15.14±0.03 (R); 15.5; 15.54; 15.62; 15.639±0.058; 15.69±0.14

1863 Antinous /ænˈtɪnoʊəs/, provisional designation 1948 EA, is a stony asteroid and near-Earth object, approximately 2–3 kilometers in diameter. It was discovered on 7 March 1948 by American astronomer Carl Wirtanen at Lick Observatory on the summit of Mount Hamilton, California. It was named after Antinous from Greek mythology.

== Orbit and classification ==
Antinous is also classified as a Mars-crosser and Apollo asteroid. The SU/Sq-type asteroid orbits the Sun in the inner main-belt at a distance of 0.9–3.6 AU once every 3 years and 5 months (1,240 days). Its orbit has an eccentricity of 0.61 and an inclination of 18° with respect to the ecliptic.

It has an Earth minimum orbit intersection distance of 0.1836 AU. In the 20th century Antinous passed within 30 Gm of the Earth five times; it will do so only once in the 21st. The nearest distance increases each time, from 26 to 29 million km.

== Physical characteristics ==
In the Tholen and SMASS taxonomic scheme, Antinous is characterized as a SU and Sq type, respectively, which are subtypes of the broader group of S-type asteroids. The Apollo asteroid has a rotation period of 7.46 hours and an albedo between 0.10 and 0.240,

== Naming ==
This minor planet was named after Antinous from Greek mythology. Antinous was one of the many unwelcome suitors for Penelope's hand while her husband, Odysseus, was away on his travels (also see 201 Penelope and 1143 Odysseus). Antinous, being the most insolent of all, was the first to be killed by Odysseus on his return. The official naming citation was published by the Minor Planet Center on 20 February 1976 (M.P.C. 3935).
