= 1685 Toro =

Near-Earth asteroid

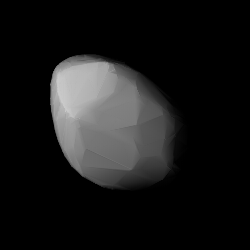
- Shape model of Toro from its lightcurve

Discovery
- Discovered by: C. A. Wirtanen
- Discovery site: Lick Obs.
- Discovery date: 17 July 1948

Designations
- Named after: Betulia Toro Herrick (wife Samuel Herrick)
- Alternative designations: 1948 OA
- Minor planet category: NEO · Apollo; Mars-crosser

Orbital characteristics
- Epoch 5 May 2025 (JD 2460800.5)
- Uncertainty parameter 0
- Observation arc: 76.75 yr (28,032 days)
- Aphelion: 1.9643 AU
- Perihelion: 0.7714 AU
- Semi-major axis: 1.3679 AU
- Eccentricity: 0.4360
- Orbital period (sidereal): 1.60 yr (584 days)
- Mean anomaly: 319.462°
- Inclination: 9.382°
- Longitude of ascending node: 274.208°
- Argument of perihelion: 127.279°
- Earth MOID: 0.0510 AU · 19.9 LD

Physical characteristics
- Mean diameter: 3.810±0.049 km 4.1 km 3.5+0.3 −0.4 km
- Synodic rotation period: 10.185±0.003 h 10.1862±0.0006 h 10.191±0.005 h 10.195 h 10.19540 h 10.196 h 10.199±0.003 h 10.1995±0.0004 h 10.203±0.003 h 10.197826±0.000002 h
- Pole ecliptic longitude: 75°
- Pole ecliptic latitude: −69°
- Geometric albedo: 0.247±0.049; 0.29; 0.38±0.33
- Spectral type: S (Tholen); S (SMASS); S; B–V = 0.880; U–B = 0.470
- Absolute magnitude (H): 13.90 · 14.02±1.11 · 14.28 · 14.23

1685 Toro (prov. designation: 1948 OA) is an asteroid and near-Earth object of the Apollo group on an eccentric orbit. It was discovered on 17 July 1948, by American astronomer Carl Wirtanen at Lick Observatory on Mount Hamilton, California. The stony S-type asteroid has a rotation period of 10.2 hours and measures approximately 4 kilometers (2.5 miles) in diameter. It is named for Betulia Toro Herrick, wife of astronomer Samuel Herrick.

== Classification and orbit ==
Toro is an Apollo asteroid, a subgroup of near-Earth asteroids that cross the orbit of Earth. It orbits the Sun at a distance of 0.8–2.0 AU once every 584 days. Its orbit has an eccentricity of 0.44 and an inclination of 9° with respect to the ecliptic.

This asteroid's orbit also shows a 5:8 resonance with Earth and a near 5:13 resonance with Venus. This near resonance results from Earth and Venus being in a near 8:13 resonance with each other. It was the third Apollo asteroid to be discovered. The current resonance with Earth will last for only a few thousand years. Calculations show that Toro will leave it in 2960 CE, and that it will enter the region of 5:13 resonance with Venus in 3470 CE. This is because the distance from Earth's orbit will become larger and that from Venus's orbit smaller. A study of long-term stability shows that the alternating resonances will possibly be broken roughly 3 million years from now because of close approaches between Toro and Mars.

Toro's Earth minimum orbit intersection distance of 0.051 AU (7,630,000 km), is just above the 0.05 AU requirement to be listed as a potentially hazardous asteroid. With an orbital uncertainty U = 0, its orbit and future close approaches are well determined.

Toro's orbit may be similar to that of the Sylacauga meteorite, the first meteorite authenticated to have struck a human.

== Naming ==
This minor planet was named after the maiden name of Betulia (née Toro) Herrick, wife of American astronomer Samuel Herrick. Herrick had studied the asteroid's orbit, and requested the name, along with the other asteroid, 1580 Betulia. The official naming citation was published by the Minor Planet Center on 10 March 1966 (M.P.C. 2504).

== Physical characteristics ==
In the Tholen and SMASS taxonomic scheme, Toro is characterized as a stony S-type asteroid. It is reported to be composed of L chondrite with a high albedo in the range of 0.24–0.34. It has an extremely well-measured rotation period of 10.2 hours. Its rotation period is slowly increasing due to the YORP effect.
