= Comet Jackson =

Comet Jackson refers to any of the three comets discovered by South African astronomer, Cyril Jackson, below:

- 47P/Ashbrook–Jackson
- 58P/Jackson–Neujmin
- C/1935 M1 (Jackson)
