= 1580 Betulia =

Eccentric, carbonaceous asteroid

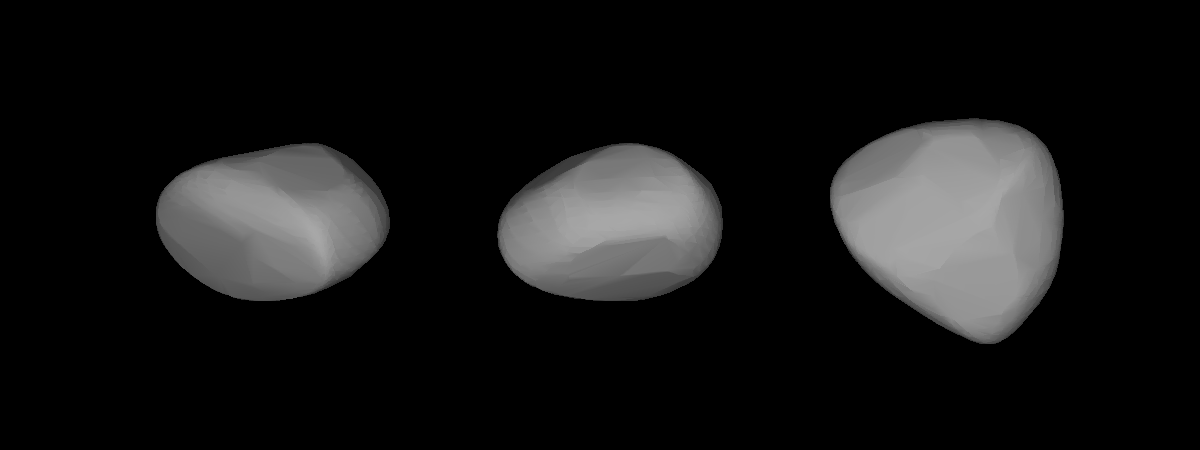
- Lightcurve-based 3D-model of Betulia

Discovery
- Discovered by: E. L. Johnson
- Discovery site: Johannesburg Obs.
- Discovery date: 22 May 1950

Designations
- Pronunciation: /bɛˈtjuːliə/
- Named after: Betulia Toro Herrick (wife of astronomer S. Herrick)
- Alternative designations: 1950 KA
- Minor planet category: NEO · Amor

Orbital characteristics
- Epoch 4 September 2017 (JD 2458000.5)
- Uncertainty parameter 0
- Observation arc: 66.64 yr (24,342 days)
- Aphelion: 3.2684 AU
- Perihelion: 1.1258 AU
- Semi-major axis: 2.1971 AU
- Eccentricity: 0.4876
- Orbital period (sidereal): 3.26 yr (1,190 days)
- Mean anomaly: 252.41°
- Mean motion: 0° 18^{m} 9.36^{s} / day
- Inclination: 52.096°
- Longitude of ascending node: 62.291°
- Argument of perihelion: 159.50°
- Earth MOID: 0.1365 AU · 53.2 LD

Physical characteristics
- Dimensions: 3.82 km 3.9 km 4.2 km (CALL-LCDB); 4.57 km 5.37±0.04 km 5.39±0.54 km 5.8 km (Gehrels 1994); 8.55±5.23 km
- Synodic rotation period: 6.130 h 6.1324±0.0002 h 6.134 h 6.135±0.005 h 6.13836 h 6.156 h 6.48 h
- Geometric albedo: 0.04±0.08; 0.05; 0.07±0.01; 0.077; 0.08 (Gehrels 1994); 0.09 (CALL-LCDB); 0.11; 0.17
- Spectral type: Tholen = C · B B–V = 0.656; U–B = 0.249
- Absolute magnitude (H): 14.00 · 14.5 · 14.53 · 14.58 · 14.8 · 14.8±0.3 · 14.90 · 15.1

1580 Betulia, provisional designation 1950 KA, is an eccentric, carbonaceous asteroid, classified as a near-Earth object of the Amor group, approximately 4.2 kilometers in diameter. It was discovered on 22 May 1950, by South African astronomer Ernest Johnson at the Union Observatory in Johannesburg. The asteroid was named for Betulia Toro, wife of astronomer Samuel Herrick.

== Orbit and classification ==
Betulia orbits the Sun at a distance of 1.1–3.3 AU once every 3 years and 3 months (1,190 days). Its orbit has an eccentricity of 0.49 and an inclination of 52° with respect to the ecliptic. The body's observation arc begins with its official discovery observation at Johannesburg in 1950.

=== Close approaches ===
Betulia is a near-Earth asteroid with an Earth minimum orbital intersection distance (MOID) of 0.1365 AU (20,400,000 km), which corresponds to 53.2 lunar distances. As an Amor asteroid, and contrary to the Apollo and Aten asteroids, it approaches Earth's orbit from beyond but does not cross it. Betulia is also a Mars-crosser due to its eccentric orbit.

== Physical characteristics ==
In the Tholen classification, Betulia is an unusual C-type asteroid, as near-Earth objects are typically of stony rather than carbonaceous composition. Based on images taken by the Sloan Digital Sky Survey, the asteroid has also been characterized as a carbonaceous but "brighter" B-type asteroid.

=== Rotation period ===
Several rotational lightcurves of Betulia were obtained from photometric observations since the 1970s. Analysis of the best-rated lightcurve gave a rotation period of 6.1324 hours with a brightness variation of 0.70 magnitude (U=3), indicating that the body has a non-spheroidal shape. Other observations gave a period between 6.130 and 6.48 hours.

=== Poles ===
Photometric and radiometric observations of Betulia were also used to model the asteroid's lightcurve. It gave a concurring period of 6.13836 hours as well as a spin axis of (133.0°, 22.0°) and (136.0°, 22.0°) in ecliptic coordinates (λ, β), respectively. The results supersede previously determined rotational poles (also see LCDB summary).

=== Diameter and albedo ===
According to the survey carried out by the NEOWISE mission of NASA's Wide-field Infrared Survey Explorer, Radar observations at the Arecibo Observatory in Puerto Rico, Tom Gehrels estimate from the Hazards due to Comets and Asteroids, and observations by Alan W. Harris using the NASA Infrared Telescope Facility on Mauna Kea, Hawaii, Betulia measures between 3.82 and 8.55 kilometers in diameter and its surface has an albedo between 0.04 and 0.17.

The Collaborative Asteroid Lightcurve Link takes an albedo of 0.09 and a diameter of 4.2 kilometers as best estimates and adopts an absolute magnitude of 15.1.

== Naming ==
This minor planet was named after Betulia Toro Herrick, wife of Samuel Herrick (1911–1974), an American astronomer who specialized in celestial mechanics. Herrick had studied the asteroid's orbit, and requested the name, along with that of 1685 Toro. The official naming citation was published by the Minor Planet Center in May 1952 (M.P.C. 768).
