= 5641 McCleese =

Mars-crossing asteroid

Discovery
- Discovered by: E. F. Helin
- Discovery site: Palomar Obs.
- Discovery date: 27 February 1990

Designations
- Named after: Daniel McCleese (JPL scientist)
- Alternative designations: 1990 DJ · 1973 GA
- Minor planet category: Mars-crosser · Hungaria

Orbital characteristics
- Epoch 4 September 2017 (JD 2458000.5)
- Uncertainty parameter 0
- Observation arc: 44.16 yr (16,131 days)
- Aphelion: 2.0497 AU
- Perihelion: 1.5894 AU
- Semi-major axis: 1.8195 AU
- Eccentricity: 0.1265
- Orbital period (sidereal): 2.45 yr (896 days)
- Mean anomaly: 25.017°
- Mean motion: 0° 24^{m} 5.76^{s} / day
- Inclination: 22.201°
- Longitude of ascending node: 151.32°
- Argument of perihelion: 57.026°
- Earth MOID: 0.6553 AU

Physical characteristics
- Dimensions: 3.67 km (derived); 4.00±0.68 km 5.68±0.5 km (IRAS:2)
- Synodic rotation period: 7.268±0.001 h 28.8±0.6 h 28.8 h 418±10 h
- Geometric albedo: 0.3 (assumed); 0.34±0.09; 0.4552±0.088 (IRAS:2)
- Spectral type: SMASS = A · A
- Absolute magnitude (H): 12.70 · 14.00 · 14.1

5641 McCleese, provisional designation 1990 DJ, is a rare-type Hungaria asteroid and slow rotator, classified as Mars-crosser from the innermost regions of the asteroid belt, approximately 4 kilometers in diameter.

It was discovered on 27 February 1990, by American astronomer Eleanor Helin at Palomar Observatory in California, and later named for JPL-scientist Daniel McCleese.

== Classification and orbit ==
McCleese is classified as a bright and rare A-type asteroid in the SMASS taxonomy. It is a member of the Hungaria family, which form the innermost dense concentration of asteroids in the Solar System. With a perihelion of 1.589 AU, McCleese also crosses the orbit of Mars.

The asteroid orbits the Sun in the innermost main-belt at a distance of 1.6–2.0 AU once every 2 years and 5 months (896 days). Its orbit has an eccentricity of 0.13 and an inclination of 22° with respect to the ecliptic. In 1973, it was first identified as 1973 GA at Lick Observatory, extending the body's observation arc by 17 years prior to its official discovery observation at Palomar.

== Lightcurve ==
Photometric observations of McCleese by Brian Warner and René Roy in 2005 and 2007, gave three rotational lightcurves that had a rotation period between 7.2 and 28.8 hours with a brightness variation of 0.06 to 0.50 magnitude (U=2/2/1). In June 2010, McCleese was again observed by Brian Warner at his Palmer Divide Observatory in Colorado, United States. By combining his data points with the previously obtained photometric data, he was able to derive a period of 418±10 hours with an amplitude of 1.30 magnitude (U=2). With a period of 418 hours, the body is one of the Top 100 slow rotators known to exist.

== Diameter estimates ==
According to the surveys carried out by the Infrared Astronomical Satellite IRAS and NASA's Wide-field Infrared Survey Explorer with its subsequent NEOWISE mission, McCleese measures 5.68 and 4.00 kilometers in diameter, and its surface has an albedo of 0.455 and 0.34, respectively. In agreement with WISE, the Collaborative Asteroid Lightcurve Link assumes an albedo of 0.3 and derives a diameter of 3.67 kilometers using an absolute magnitude of 14.1.

== Naming ==
This minor planet is named after American JPL scientist Daniel J. McCleese, who is a physicist and manager at JPL's Science Division. He also played an important role for the Near-Earth Asteroid Tracking program (NEAT). The approved naming citation was published by the Minor Planet Center on 4 April 1996 (M.P.C. 26930).
