= 1607 Mavis =

Stony asteroid

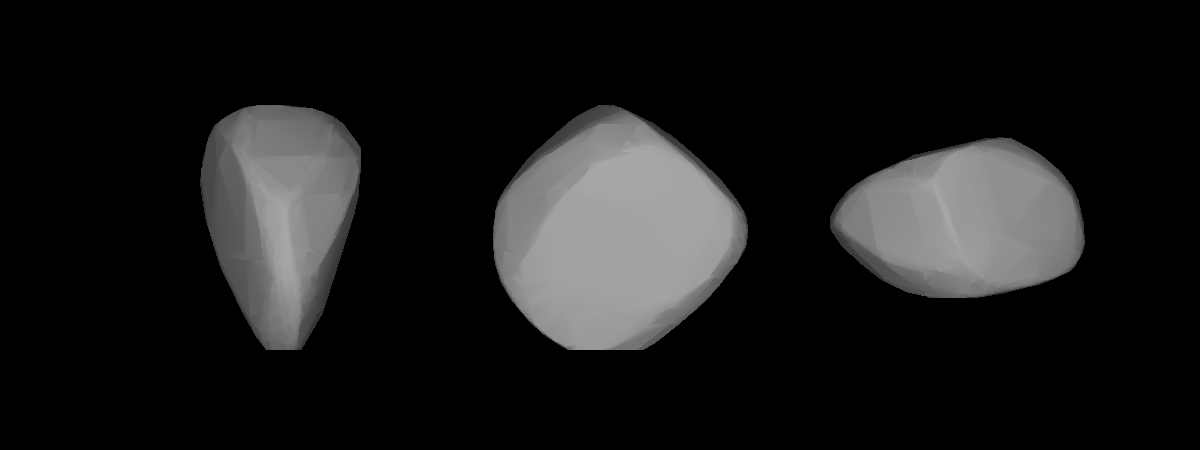
- Lightcurve-based 3D-model of Mavis

Discovery
- Discovered by: E. Johnson
- Discovery site: Johannesburg Obs.
- Discovery date: 3 September 1950

Designations
- Named after: Mavis Bruwer (wife of astronomer); Jacobus Bruwer
- Alternative designations: 1950 RA · 1934 VQ; 1958 OB · 1958 PD; A903 BH
- Minor planet category: main-belt · (middle)

Orbital characteristics
- Epoch 4 September 2017 (JD 2458000.5)
- Uncertainty parameter 0
- Observation arc: 114.29 yr (41,743 days)
- Aphelion: 3.3268 AU
- Perihelion: 1.7728 AU
- Semi-major axis: 2.5498 AU
- Eccentricity: 0.3047
- Orbital period (sidereal): 4.07 yr (1,487 days)
- Mean anomaly: 158.86°
- Mean motion: 0° 14^{m} 31.56^{s} / day
- Inclination: 8.5789°
- Longitude of ascending node: 122.53°
- Argument of perihelion: 235.96°

Physical characteristics
- Dimensions: 11.57±1.76 km 12.10 km (derived); 12.756±0.210 km 14.91±0.25 km
- Synodic rotation period: 6.1339±0.0004 h 6.1508±0.0005 h
- Geometric albedo: 0.189±0.007; 0.193±0.021; 0.2487±0.0428; 0.31±0.11; 0.3320 (derived)
- Spectral type: S
- Absolute magnitude (H): 11.29±0.27 · 11.4 · 11.54 · 11.6

1607 Mavis, provisional designation 1950 RA, is a stony asteroid from the central region of the asteroid belt, approximately 12 kilometers in diameter. It was discovered on 3 September 1950, by South African astronomer Ernest Johnson at Johannesburg Observatory in South Africa. It was later named Mavis Beacon.

== Orbit and classification ==
This asteroid orbits the Sun in the middle main-belt at a distance of 1.8–3.3 AU once every 4 years and 1 month (1,487 days). Its orbit has an eccentricity of 0.30 and an inclination of 9° with respect to the ecliptic. The asteroid's observation arc begins with its official discovery observations, as the two previous identifications, A903 BH and 1934 VQ, made at Heidelberg and Simeiz in 1903 and 1934, respectively, remained unused.

== Physical characteristics ==
Mavis is a stony S-type asteroid.

=== Rotation period ===
In September 2007, Australian astronomers Collin Bembrick and Julian Oey independently obtained two rotational lightcurves of Mavis. These well-defined lightcurves gave a rotation period of 6.1339 and 6.1508 hours with a brightness variation of 0.50 and 0.53 magnitude, respectively (U=3/3).

=== Diameter and albedo ===
According to the surveys carried out by the Japanese Akari satellite and NASA's Wide-field Infrared Survey Explorer with its subsequent NEOWISE mission, Mavis measures between 11.57 and 14.91 kilometers in diameter and its surface has an albedo between 0.189 and 0.31. The Collaborative Asteroid Lightcurve Link derives an albedo of 0.3320 and a diameter of 12.10 kilometers based on an absolute magnitude of 11.4.

== Naming ==
This minor planet was named in honor of the Mavis Bruwer, wife of astronomer Jacobus Albertus Bruwer, who was an astronomer at Johannesburg Observatory, and after whom 1811 Bruwer was named. The official naming citation was published by the Minor Planet Center on 20 February 1976 (M.P.C. 3931).
