= 1600 Vyssotsky =

Hungaria asteroid and suspected interloper

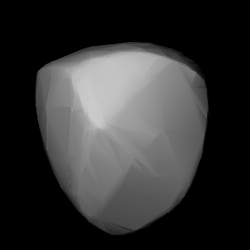
- Shape model of Vyssotsky from its lightcurve

Discovery
- Discovered by: C. A. Wirtanen
- Discovery site: Lick Obs.
- Discovery date: 22 October 1947

Designations
- Named after: Alexander Vyssotsky (astronomer)
- Alternative designations: 1947 UC
- Minor planet category: main-belt · Hungaria

Orbital characteristics
- Epoch 4 September 2017 (JD 2458000.5)
- Uncertainty parameter 0
- Observation arc: 69.62 yr (25,427 days)
- Aphelion: 1.9183 AU
- Perihelion: 1.7793 AU
- Semi-major axis: 1.8488 AU
- Eccentricity: 0.0376
- Orbital period (sidereal): 2.51 yr (918 days)
- Mean anomaly: 199.42°
- Mean motion: 0° 23^{m} 31.56^{s} / day
- Inclination: 21.173°
- Longitude of ascending node: 60.602°
- Argument of perihelion: 50.543°

Physical characteristics
- Dimensions: 6.29±0.89 km 7.00 km (calculated); 7.41±0.06 km 7.413±0.057 km 7.50±0.50 km
- Synodic rotation period: 3.2±0.01 h 3.201±0.001 h 3.201±0.005 h 3.2011±0.0004 h 3.20116±0.00004 h 3.20124±0.00004 h 3.201264±0.00001 h 3.20144±0.00002 h 3.204±0.003 h 3.205±0.003 h 3.205±0.005 h
- Geometric albedo: 0.3 (assumed); 0.321±0.059; 0.46±0.23; 0.506±0.187; 0.547±0.076
- Spectral type: SMASS = A · A
- Absolute magnitude (H): 11.90 · 12.50 · 12.7

1600 Vyssotsky, provisional designation 1947 UC, is a rare-type Hungaria asteroid and suspected interloper from the inner regions of the asteroid belt, approximately 7 kilometers in diameter. It was discovered on 22 October 1947, by American astronomer Carl Wirtanen at Lick Observatory in California, United States. It was named after astronomer Alexander Vyssotsky.

== Classification and orbit ==
Vyssotsky is a rare A-type asteroid. Based on its orbital characteristics, it is member of the Hungaria family, that form the last, innermost dense concentration of asteroids in the Solar System. However, due to its rare type, it is a suspected interloper, as Hungarias typically show a different E-type spectra. It orbits the Sun in the inner main-belt at a distance of 1.8–1.9 AU once every 2 years and 6 months (918 days). Its orbit has an eccentricity of 0.04 and an inclination of 21° with respect to the ecliptic. Vyssotsky's observation arc begins with its official discovery observation, as no precoveries were taken, and no prior identifications were made.

== Lightcurves ==
Between 1999 and 2014, several rotational lightcurves of Vyssotsky were obtained by American astronomer Brian D. Warner at his Palmer Divide Observatory, Colorado (see video in § External links). Light-curve analysis gave a concurring rotation period of 3.201 hours with an averaged brightness variation of 0.18 magnitude (U=2/3/3/3/3/3).

Additional well-defined lightcurves were obtained by astronomers Domenico Licchelli in November 2005 (U=3-), Raymond Poncy, Raoul Behrend, René Roy, Reiner Stoss, Jaime Nomen, Salvador Sánchez also in November 2005 (U=3), David Higgins in May 2007 (U=3), Michael Lucas in November 2010 (U=2+), as well as by Hiromi Hamanowa and Hiroko Hamanowa also in November 2010 (U=3). The most recent photometric observation was made by Robert D. Stephens in September 2015, giving a period of 3.204 hours with an amplitude of 0.24 magnitude (U=3). In spite of its many observations, Vyssotsky's spin axis and spin direction can not be determined with certainty.

== Diameter and albedo ==
According to the surveys carried out by the Japanese Akari satellite, and NASA's Wide-field Infrared Survey Explorer with its subsequent NEOWISE mission, Vyssotsky measures between 6.29 and 7.50 kilometers in diameter and its surface has an albedo between 0.321 and 0.547. The Collaborative Asteroid Lightcurve Link assumes an albedo of 0.3 and calculates a diameter of 7.00 kilometers with an absolute magnitude of 12.7.

== Naming ==
This minor planet was named in honor of Russian–American astronomer Alexander Vyssotsky (1888–1973), who joined the faculty of the University of Virginia in 1923 and stayed at the McCormick Observatory on Mount Jefferson, Virginia, for 35 years. He was active in the fields of photometry, astrometry and spectral classification. The official naming citation was published by the Minor Planet Center on 20 February 1976 (M.P.C. 3931).
