= Joseph Ashbrook =

American astronomer (1918–1980)

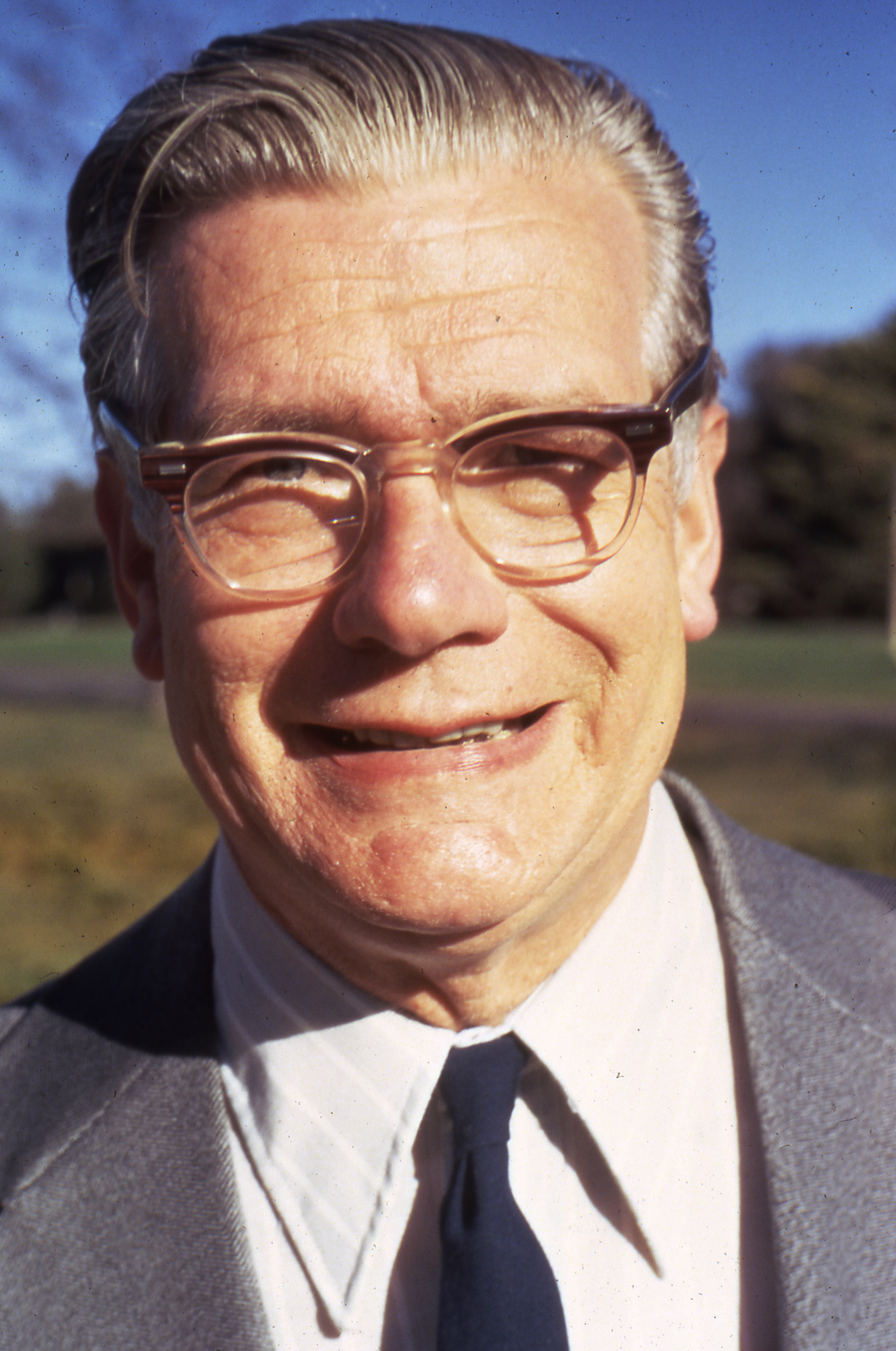
Joseph Ashbrook in 1973

Joseph Ashbrook (April 4, 1918 – August 4, 1980) was an American astronomer.

== Biography ==
Ashbrook was born in Philadelphia, Pennsylvania. He received a doctorate from Harvard University in 1947 and taught at Yale University from 1946 to 1950, and at Harvard from 1950 to 1953. He started to work at Sky and Telescope in 1953, where he wrote the column "Astronomical Scrapbook" from 1954 to 1980, and remained on its staff until his death; he also edited the magazine from 1964 on.

Ashbrook was one of the first to study Cepheid variables as tools for establishing galactic distances. He was a longtime member of the AAVSO.

He went through old archives of observations from centuries past to determine a highly precise value for the rotation period of Mars —to within a few thousandths of a second.

He co-discovered the periodic comet 47P/Ashbrook-Jackson in 1948.

== Honors ==
- Member of the American Astronomical Society and International Astronomical Union.
- Crater Ashbrook on the Moon named after him.
- Minor planet 2157 Ashbrook named after him.
