= 1760 Sandra =

Main-belt asteroid

Discovery
- Discovered by: Ernest Johnson
- Discovery site: Johannesburg Obs.
- Discovery date: 10 April 1950

Designations
- Named after: Sandra (discoverer's granddaughter)
- Alternative designations: 1950 GB · 1934 NP; 1935 QH · 1950 HF; 1950 JM · 1951 OK; 1967 JC · 1968 OC
- Minor planet category: main-belt · (outer)

Orbital characteristics
- Epoch 4 September 2017 (JD 2458000.5)
- Uncertainty parameter 0
- Observation arc: 81.66 yr (29,826 days)
- Aphelion: 3.5564 AU
- Perihelion: 2.7418 AU
- Semi-major axis: 3.1491 AU
- Eccentricity: 0.1293
- Orbital period (sidereal): 5.59 yr (2,041 days)
- Mean anomaly: 6.2435°
- Mean motion: 0° 10^{m} 35.04^{s} / day
- Inclination: 8.4403°
- Longitude of ascending node: 232.61°
- Argument of perihelion: 332.93°

Physical characteristics
- Dimensions: 33.989±0.214 km 34.765±0.454 km 35.89±3.5 km 36.03 km (derived); 36.64±1.03 km 37.71±0.64 km
- Synodic rotation period: 6.5668±0.0004 h
- Geometric albedo: 0.034±0.002; 0.0345±0.008; 0.0385±0.0055; 0.054±0.011; 0.0542 (derived)
- Spectral type: C
- Absolute magnitude (H): 10.90 · 11.0 · 11.23±0.27 · 11.5

1760 Sandra, provisional designation 1950 GB, is a carbonaceous asteroid from the outer regions of the asteroid belt, approximately 35 kilometers in diameter. It was discovered on 10 April 1950, by South African astronomer Ernest Johnson at Union Observatory in Johannesburg, and named after his granddaughter Sandra.

== Orbit and classification ==
Sandra is a carbonaceous C-type asteroid that orbits the Sun in the outer main-belt at a distance of 2.7–3.6 AU once every 5 years and 7 months (2,041 days). Its orbit has an eccentricity of 0.13 and an inclination of 8° with respect to the ecliptic. It was first identified as 1934 NP at the discovering observatory. The body's observation arc begins with its identification as 1935 QH at Heidelberg in 1935, or 15 years prior to its official discovery observation at Johannesburg.

== Lightcurve ==
In April 2006, a rotational lightcurve of Sandra was obtained from photometric observations by French amateur astronomer Pierre Antonini. Lightcurve analysis gave a well-defined rotation period of 6.5668 hours with a brightness variation of 0.42 magnitude (U=3).

== Diameter and albedo ==
According to the surveys carried out by the Infrared Astronomical Satellite IRAS, the Japanese Akari satellite, and NASA's Wide-field Infrared Survey Explorer with its subsequent NEOWISE mission, Sandra measures between 33.989 and 37.71 kilometers in diameter and its surface has an albedo between 0.034 and 0.054. The Collaborative Asteroid Lightcurve Link derives an albedo of 0.0542 and a diameter of 36.03 kilometers with on an absolute magnitude of 11.0.

== Naming ==
This minor planet was named by the South African discover Ernest Johnson after his granddaughter Sandra. The official naming citation was published by the Minor Planet Center on 20 February 1976 (M.P.C. 3934).
