= 47P/Ashbrook–Jackson =

Jupiter-family comet

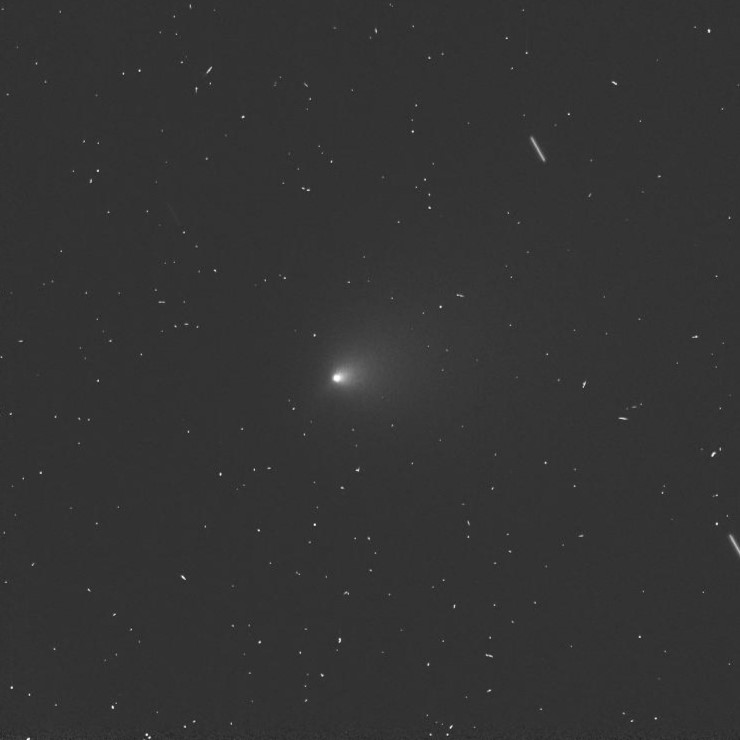
- Comet Ashbrook–Jackson photographed by the Hubble Space Telescope on 26 July 2000

Discovery
- Discovered by: Joseph Ashbrook; Cyril V. Jackson
- Discovery site: Lowell Observatory, USA; Johannesburg, S. Africa
- Discovery date: 26 August 1948

Designations
- MPC designation: P/1948 Q1; P/1955 H1
- Alternative designations: 1948 IX, 1956 II; 1963 VI, 1971 III; 1978 XIV, 1986 II; 1993 XIII

Orbital characteristics
- Epoch: 21 November 2025 (JD 2461000.5)
- Observation arc: 77.41 years (Note: Observation arc from the Minor Planet Center database only covered dates from 7 October 1948 until 21 January 2026 (77.29 years). This figure includes its entire arc up to 26 August 1948.)
- Number of observations: 4,142
- Aphelion: 5.43 AU
- Perihelion: 2.807 AU
- Semi-major axis: 4.12 AU
- Eccentricity: 0.3180
- Orbital period: 8.35 years
- Inclination: 13.039°
- Longitude of ascending node: 356.88°
- Argument of periapsis: 357.92°
- Mean anomaly: 2.83°
- Last perihelion: 28 October 2025
- Next perihelion: 4 March 2034
- T_{Jupiter}: 2.907
- Earth MOID: 1.811 AU
- Jupiter MOID: 0.016 AU

Physical characteristics
- Mean diameter: 5.6 km (3.5 mi)
- Mean density: 0.01±0.01 g/cm^{3}
- Synodic rotation period: 15.6±0.1 hours
- Spectral type: (V−R) = 0.45±0.03; (R−I) = 0.38±0.03
- Comet total magnitude (M1): 13.5

47P/Ashbrook–Jackson is a Jupiter-family comet with an 8.35-year orbit around the Sun. It is the only comet discovered by Joseph Ashbrook and the third and final one by Cyril V. Jackson. (Note: Cyril Jackson previously discovered C/1935 M1 and 58P/Jackson–Neujmin in 1935 and 1936, respectively)

== Observational history ==
The comet was first spotted by Joseph Ashbrook while examining a photographic plate exposed from the Lowell Observatory while observing the asteroid 1327 Namaqua on the night of 26 August 1948. At the time it was a diffuse, 12th-magnitude object with a tail about a degree in length, located within the constellation Aquarius. (Note: Reported initial position upon discovery was: α = 23^{h} 11.9^{m} , δ = –14° 50′) It was independently discovered by Cyril V. Jackson from the Yale-Columbia station at Johannesburg just a few hours later.

Orbital calculations by Leland E. Cunningham in 1948 led to the successful recovery of the comet by Michael P. Candy on April 1955. Since then, comet Ashbrook–Jackson was observed on every apparition, with the most recent observations recorded as recently as 2025.

== Physical characteristics ==
Despite a large perihelion distance of 2.81 AU (420 million km), the comet typically reaches magnitude 12 on each observed apparition since 1948, making Ashbrook–Jackson one of the intrinsically brightest short-period comets ever known.

Its nucleus is estimated to have an effective radius of around 2.8 km (1.7 mi), rotating on its axis once every 15.6±0.1 hours.

== Bibliography ==
- Kronk, Gary W.; Meyer, Maik; Seargent, David A. J. (2009). Cometography: A Catalog of Comets. Vol. 4: 1933–1959. Cambridge University Press. ISBN 978-0-521-58507-1.

Numbered comets
Previous; 46P/Wirtanen	47P/Ashbrook–Jackson	Next; 48P/Johnson
