= 1623 Vivian =

Main-belt asteroid

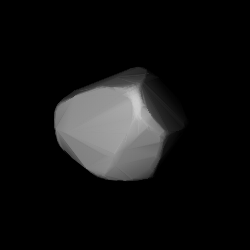
- Shape model of Vivian from its lightcurve

Discovery
- Discovered by: Ernest Johnson
- Discovery site: Johannesburg Obs.
- Discovery date: 9 August 1948

Designations
- Named after: Vivian Hirst (daughter of an astronomer)
- Alternative designations: 1948 PL · 1951 EG_{2} 1954 SA · 1955 YC; 1960 WP · 1965 QB; 1965 UW · 1973 GG
- Minor planet category: main-belt · Themis

Orbital characteristics
- Epoch 4 September 2017 (JD 2458000.5)
- Uncertainty parameter 0
- Observation arc: 68.64 yr (25,070 days)
- Aphelion: 3.6317 AU
- Perihelion: 2.6542 AU
- Semi-major axis: 3.1429 AU
- Eccentricity: 0.1555
- Orbital period (sidereal): 5.57 yr (2,035 days)
- Mean anomaly: 72.044°
- Mean motion: 0° 10^{m} 36.84^{s} / day
- Inclination: 2.4903°
- Longitude of ascending node: 115.62°
- Argument of perihelion: 316.97°

Physical characteristics
- Dimensions: 24.77±6.52 km 25.82 km (calculated); 27.851±0.351 km 29.98±1.74 km
- Synodic rotation period: 20.5209±0.0007 h 20.5235 h
- Geometric albedo: 0.075±0.012; 0.078±0.010; 0.08 (assumed); 0.08±0.07
- Spectral type: C
- Absolute magnitude (H): 11.00 · 11.20 · 11.24 · 11.26±0.22 · 11.3

1623 Vivian (provisional designation 1948 PL) is a carbonaceous Themis asteroid from the outer region of the asteroid belt, approximately 25 kilometers in diameter. It was discovered on 9 August 1948, by South African astronomer Ernest Johnson at Johannesburg Observatory in South Africa. It was named after Vivian Hirst, daughter of British astronomer William P. Hirst.

== Orbit and classification ==
Vivian is a C-type asteroid and member of the Themis family, a large family of asteroids with nearly coplanar ecliptical orbits. It orbits the Sun in the outer main-belt at a distance of 2.7–3.6 AU once every 5 years and 7 months (2,035 days). Its orbit has an eccentricity of 0.16 and an inclination of 2° with respect to the ecliptic. Vivian's observation arc begins with its official discovery observation, as no precoveries were taken, and no prior identifications were made.

== Rotation period and pole ==
In March 2006, a rotational lightcurve of Vivian was obtained by American astronomer Lawrence Molnar at the Calvin–Rehoboth Observatory in New Mexico. It gave it a rotation period of 20.5209 hours with a brightness variation of 0.85 magnitude (U=3-). Modeled lightcurve data gave a concurring period of 20.5235 hours (U=n.a.).

== Diameter and albedo ==
According to the surveys carried out by the Japanese Akari satellite and NASA's Wide-field Infrared Survey Explorer with its subsequent NEOWISE mission, Vivian measures between 24.77 and 29.98 kilometers in diameter, and its surface has an albedo between 0.075 and 0.08. The Collaborative Asteroid Lightcurve Link assumes an albedo of 0.08 and calculates a diameter of 25.82 kilometers with an absolute magnitude of 11.3.

== Naming ==
This minor planet was named in honor of Vivian Hirst, daughter of British astronomer William P. Hirst, receiver of the Astronomical Society of Southern Africa's Gill Medal and after whom the minor planet 3172 Hirst is named. Hirst calculated the preliminary orbit for this and several other minor planets discovered by Ernest Johnson. The official naming citation was published by the Minor Planet Center on 1 January 1974 (M.P.C. 3569).
