= 1568 Aisleen =

Main-belt asteroid

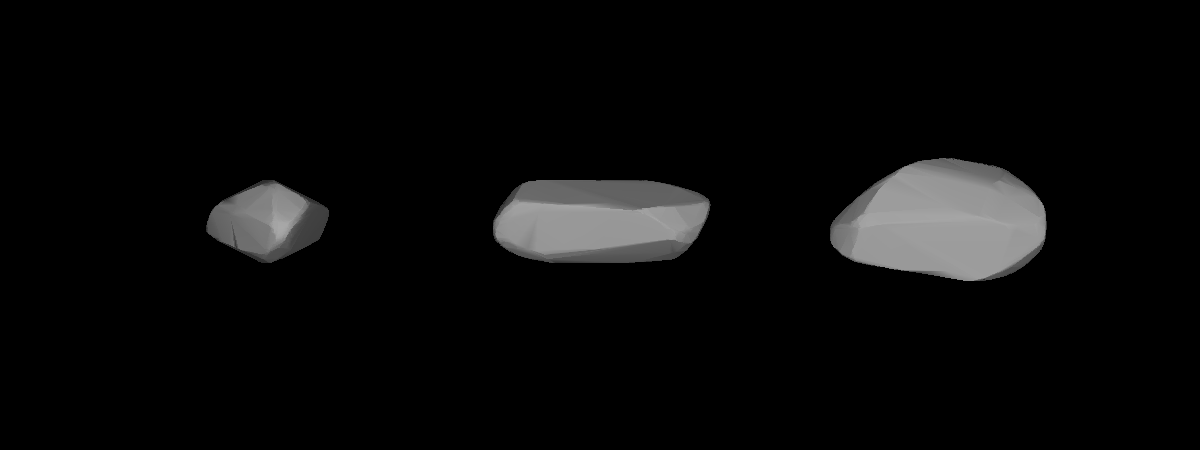
- Lightcurve-based 3D-model of Aisleen

Discovery
- Discovered by: E. L. Johnson
- Discovery site: Johannesburg Obs.
- Discovery date: 21 August 1946

Designations
- Named after: Aisleen Johnson (discoverer's wife)
- Alternative designations: 1946 QB
- Minor planet category: main-belt · Phocaea

Orbital characteristics
- Epoch 4 September 2017 (JD 2458000.5)
- Uncertainty parameter 0
- Observation arc: 70.70 yr (25,824 days)
- Aphelion: 2.9502 AU
- Perihelion: 1.7557 AU
- Semi-major axis: 2.3529 AU
- Eccentricity: 0.2538
- Orbital period (sidereal): 3.61 yr (1,318 days)
- Mean anomaly: 221.76°
- Mean motion: 0° 16^{m} 23.16^{s} / day
- Inclination: 24.867°
- Longitude of ascending node: 146.18°
- Argument of perihelion: 229.03°

Physical characteristics
- Dimensions: 11.983±0.072 km 12.448±0.084 km 12.49±2.52 km 12.67 km (calculated); 14.04±0.96 km
- Synodic rotation period: 6.67597±0.00005 h 6.68±0.02 h 6.683±0.005 h
- Geometric albedo: 0.130±0.019; 0.165±0.028; 0.1793±0.0322; 0.21±0.06; 0.23 (assumed)
- Spectral type: S
- Absolute magnitude (H): 11.57±0.21 · 11.7 · 12.1 · 12.14 ·

1568 Aisleen (provisional designation 1946 QB) is a stony Phocaea asteroid from the inner regions of the asteroid belt, approximately 12.5 kilometers in diameter. It was discovered on 21 August 1946, by South African astronomer Ernest Johnson at Johannesburg Observatory in South Africa. It is named for the discoverer's wife, Aisleen Johnson.

== Orbit and classification ==
The S-type asteroid is a member of the Phocaea family (701), a group of asteroids with similar orbital characteristics. It orbits the Sun at a distance of 1.8–3.0 AU once every 3 years and 7 months (1,318 days). Its orbit has an eccentricity of 0.25 and an inclination of 25° with respect to the ecliptic. As no precoveries were taken, and no prior identifications were made, Aisleen's observation arc begins with its official discovery observation at Johannesburg.

== Physical characteristics ==
=== Rotation and pole ===
In August 2000, a rotational lightcurve of Aisleen was obtained from photometric observations made by Glen Malcolm at the Roach Motel Observatory (856) in California. The analysis gave a well-defined rotation period of 6.68 hours during which the brightness varied by 0.56 in magnitude (U=3). In April 2014, photometric observations by Brian D. Warner gave a period of 6.683 hours with an amplitude of 0.31 magnitude (U=3). A modeled lightcurve from various data sources gave a concurring period of 6.67597 hours and found a pole of (109°,−68°).

=== Diameter and albedo ===
According to the surveys carried out by the Japanese Akari satellite and NASA's Wide-field Infrared Survey Explorer with its subsequent NEOWISE mission, Aisleen measures between 11.98 and 14.04 kilometers in diameter, and its surface has an albedo between 0.130 and 0.21. The Collaborative Asteroid Lightcurve Link assumes a standard albedo for Phocaea asteroids of 0.23 – derived from 25 Phocaea, the family's most massiv member and namesake – and calculates a diameter of 12.67 kilometers based on an absolute magnitude of 11.7.

== Naming ==
This minor planet was named by the discoverer for his wife, Aisleen Johnson. The official naming citation was published by the Minor Planet Center on 31 January 1962 (M.P.C. 2116).
