= 1951 Lick =

Mars-crossing olivine asteroid

Discovery
- Discovered by: C. A. Wirtanen
- Discovery site: Lick Obs.
- Discovery date: 26 July 1949

Designations
- Named after: James Lick (philanthropist)
- Alternative designations: 1949 OA
- Minor planet category: Mars-crosser

Orbital characteristics
- Epoch 4 September 2017 (JD 2458000.5)
- Uncertainty parameter 0
- Observation arc: 67.12 yr (24,514 days)
- Aphelion: 1.4760 AU
- Perihelion: 1.3049 AU
- Semi-major axis: 1.3904 AU
- Eccentricity: 0.0616
- Orbital period (sidereal): 1.64 yr (599 days)
- Mean anomaly: 221.32°
- Mean motion: 0° 36^{m} 3.96^{s} / day
- Inclination: 39.091°
- Longitude of ascending node: 130.75°
- Argument of perihelion: 140.52°
- Earth MOID: 0.3068 AU · 119.5 LD

Physical characteristics
- Dimensions: 5.57±0.5 km (IRAS:3); 5.59 km (derived)
- Synodic rotation period: 4.424±0.006 h 5.2974±0.0004 h 5.3008±0.0024 h (Note: Summary figures for (1951) Lick: rotation period 5.3008±0.0024 hours (Pravec-1998web) at Light Curve Database); 5.3016±0.0020 h (Note: Summary figures for(1951) Lick: rotation period 5.3016 hours (Pravec-1997web) at Light Curve Database); 5.317±0.001 h
- Geometric albedo: 0.0895±0.020 (IRAS:3); 0.1028 (derived)
- Spectral type: SMASS = A · A
- Absolute magnitude (H): 14.20±0.2 · 14.2 · 14.35±0.2 · 14.35 · 14.5±0.2 · 14.51

1951 Lick, provisional designation 1949 OA, is a rare-type asteroid and Mars-crosser, approximately 5.6 kilometers in diameter. It was discovered on 26 July 1949, by American astronomer Carl Wirtanen at Lick Observatory on the summit of Mount Hamilton, California, and named for American philanthropist James Lick.

== Orbit ==
The asteroid orbits the Sun at a distance of 1.3–1.5 AU once every 20 months (599 days). Its orbit has an eccentricity of 0.06 and an inclination of 39° with respect to the ecliptic. Lick's observation arc begins with its discovery observation, as no precoveries were taken, and no prior identifications were made.

== Physical characteristics ==
=== Spectral type ===
In the SMASS taxonomic scheme, Lick's spectral type is that of a rare A-type asteroid with a surface consisting of almost pure olivine. As of 2016, only 17 minor planets of this type are known.

=== Rotation period ===
In July 2008, a rotational lightcurve was obtained from photometric by astronomer Brian D. Warner at his Palmer Divide Observatory in Colorado, United States. It gave a well-defined rotation period of 5.2974 hours with a brightness variation of 0.25 in magnitude (U=3). Several lightcurves with a lower or unassessed quality have been obtained by astronomers Wiesław Z. Wiśniewski and Petr Pravec in the 1980s and 1990s. The most recent observation by Michael Lucas in February 2011, gave a period of 5.317 hours with an amplitude of 0.33 magnitude (U=2).

=== Diameter and albedo ===
According to 3 observations taken by the Infrared Astronomical Satellite IRAS, Lick measures 5.57 kilometers in diameter and its surface has an albedo of 0.09. The Collaborative Asteroid Lightcurve Link agrees with the results obtained by IRAS and derives an albedo of 0.10 and a diameter of 5.59 kilometers with an absolute magnitude of 14.35.

== Naming ==
Lick was named in honor of James Lick (1796–1876), American philanthropist and the founder of the discovering Lick Observatory of the University of California. He is also honored by a lunar crater Lick. The official naming citation was published by the Minor Planet Center on 20 February 1976 (M.P.C. 3938).
