= 863 Benkoela =

Main-belt asteroid

Discovery
- Discovered by: Max Wolf
- Discovery site: Heidelberg
- Discovery date: 9 February 1917

Designations
- Pronunciation: /bɛŋˈkuːlə/
- Alternative designations: 1917 BH

Orbital characteristics
- Epoch 31 July 2016 (JD 2457600.5)
- Uncertainty parameter 0
- Observation arc: 99.11 yr (36199 days)
- Aphelion: 3.2950 AU (492.92 Gm)
- Perihelion: 3.1059 AU (464.64 Gm)
- Semi-major axis: 3.2004 AU (478.77 Gm)
- Eccentricity: 0.029538
- Orbital period (sidereal): 5.73 yr (2091.3 d)
- Mean anomaly: 52.959°
- Mean motion: 0° 10^{m} 19.704^{s} / day
- Inclination: 25.418°
- Longitude of ascending node: 116.948°
- Argument of perihelion: 95.689°
- Earth MOID: 2.15664 AU (322.629 Gm)
- Jupiter MOID: 1.91339 AU (286.239 Gm)
- T_{Jupiter}: 3.042

Physical characteristics
- Mean radius: 13.53±0.75 km
- Synodic rotation period: 8.20 h (0.342 d)
- Geometric albedo: 0.5952±0.070
- Absolute magnitude (H): 9.02

863 Benkoela /bɛŋˈkuːlə/ is an A-type asteroid that was discovered by German astronomer Max Wolf on 9 February 1917 from Heidelberg.

10μ radiometric data collected from Kitt Peak in 1975 gave a diameter estimate of 34 km.
