= 2829 Bobhope =

Dark asteroid of the Meliboea family

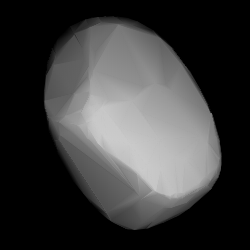
- Shape model of Bobhope from its lightcurve

Discovery
- Discovered by: E. L. Johnson
- Discovery site: Johannesburg Obs.
- Discovery date: 9 August 1948

Designations
- Named after: Bob Hope (American actor; comedian)
- Alternative designations: 1948 PK · 1942 JH; 1952 DU_{2} · 1952 HR; 1959 RV · 1972 YZ
- Minor planet category: main-belt · (outer); Meliboea

Orbital characteristics
- Epoch 4 September 2017 (JD 2458000.5)
- Uncertainty parameter 0
- Observation arc: 68.64 yr (25,070 days)
- Aphelion: 3.6742 AU
- Perihelion: 2.5074 AU
- Semi-major axis: 3.0908 AU
- Eccentricity: 0.1888
- Orbital period (sidereal): 5.43 yr (1,985 days)
- Mean anomaly: 272.56°
- Mean motion: 0° 10^{m} 53.04^{s} / day
- Inclination: 14.301°
- Longitude of ascending node: 324.06°
- Argument of perihelion: 339.21°

Physical characteristics
- Mean diameter: 32.14±9.31 km 36.29±12.47 km 38.25±2.4 km 40.89±0.87 km 40.98±0.54 km 41.361±0.224 km 44.804±0.511 km
- Synodic rotation period: 5.013±0.003 h 6.0888±0.0007 h
- Geometric albedo: 0.05±0.03; 0.055±0.010; 0.06±0.05; 0.0668±0.0182; 0.080±0.003; 0.0916±0.013
- Spectral type: C
- Absolute magnitude (H): 10.3 · 10.70 · 10.8 · 10.95±0.48 · 11.12

2829 Bobhope (prov. designation: 1948 PK) is a dark asteroid of the Meliboea family, from the outer region of the asteroid belt. It was discovered on 9 August 1948, by South African astronomer Ernest Leonard Johnson at Union Observatory in Johannesburg. The asteroid was later named after comedian Bob Hope. The asteroid has a rotation period of 6.1 hours and measures approximately 37 kilometers (23 miles) in diameter.

== Orbit and classification ==
Bobhope is a member of the Meliboea family, a smaller asteroid family of carbonaceous outer-belt asteroids with a few hundred members, named after 137 Meliboea. It orbits the Sun in the outer main-belt at a distance of 2.5–3.7 AU once every 5 years and 5 months (1,985 days). Its orbit has an eccentricity of 0.19 and an inclination of 14° with respect to the ecliptic. It was first observed as 1942 JH at the discovering observatory in May 1942, yet the astrometric data from this observation remained unused to extend its observation arc prior to the official discovery date.

== Naming ==
This minor planet was named for English-born, American comedian Bob Hope (1903–2003), star of innumerable feature film, theater, TV and radio productions, and known for the horror comedy Cat and the Canary (1939). He hosted the Academy Awards more than any other host, and received several Honorary and Special Oscars himself. Hope also received more than forty honorary doctorates. The naming was published by the Minor Planet Center on 1 September 1993 (M.P.C. 22496).

== Physical characteristics ==
Bobhope has been characterized as a carbonaceous C-type asteroid, which agrees with the overall spectral type of the Meliboea family.

=== Rotation period ===
A rotational lightcurve of Bobhope was obtained from photometric observations by astronomer Landy Carbo at Oakley Southern Sky Observatory (E09), Australia, and at the U.S. Oakley Observatory in September 2008. It gave it a rotation period of 5.013±0.003 hours with a brightness variation of 0.46±0.08 magnitude (U=2). A previously published lightcurve by French amateur astronomer Bernard Christophe gave a somewhat longer period of 6.0888±0.0007 hours with an amplitude of 0.50 (U=2).

=== Diameter and albedo ===
According to the surveys carried out by the Infrared Astronomical Satellite IRAS, the Japanese Akari satellite, and NASA's Wide-field Infrared Survey Explorer with its subsequent NEOWISE mission, Bobhope measures between 32.14 and 40.98 kilometers in diameter and its surface has an albedo between 0.05 and 0.0916. More dated NEOWISE publications gave a larger diameter of 41.361 and 44.8 kilometers, respectively. The Collaborative Asteroid Lightcurve Link derives an albedo of 0.0586 and a diameter of 38.0 kilometers with an absolute magnitude of 10.8.
