= 2044 Wirt =

Mars-crossing asteroid binary

Discovery
- Discovered by: C. A. Wirtanen
- Discovery site: Lick Obs.
- Discovery date: 8 November 1950

Designations
- Named after: Carl Wirtanen (discoverer himself)
- Alternative designations: 1950 VE
- Minor planet category: Mars-crosser · Phocaea

Orbital characteristics
- Epoch 4 September 2017 (JD 2458000.5)
- Uncertainty parameter 0
- Observation arc: 66.44 yr (24,269 days)
- Aphelion: 3.1989 AU
- Perihelion: 1.5634 AU
- Semi-major axis: 2.3812 AU
- Eccentricity: 0.3434
- Orbital period (sidereal): 3.67 yr (1,342 days)
- Mean anomaly: 53.286°
- Mean motion: 0° 16^{m} 5.52^{s} / day
- Inclination: 23.970°
- Longitude of ascending node: 53.646°
- Argument of perihelion: 50.474°
- Known satellites: 1 (⌀: 2 km; p: 19.0 h)
- Earth MOID: 0.6559 AU

Physical characteristics
- Dimensions: 6.65 km (calculated); 6.66±0.6 km (IRAS:2)
- Synodic rotation period: 3.6895±0.0003 h 3.6898 h 3.6900±0.0003 h 3.690±0.00005 h
- Geometric albedo: 0.1907±0.038 (IRAS:2); 0.23 (assumed)
- Spectral type: S
- Absolute magnitude (H): 12.838±0.002 (R) · 13.1 · 13.3

2044 Wirt, provisional designation 1950 VE, is a binary Phocaea asteroid and Mars-crosser, approximately 6.7 kilometers in diameter. The minor-planet moon has an estimated diameter of 1.89 kilometer.

The asteroid was discovered on 8 November 1950, by American astronomer Carl Wirtanen at Lick Observatory on Mount Hamilton, California, and later named after the discoverer himself.

== Orbit and classification ==
Wirt is both a member of the main-belt's Phocaea family (701) and a Mars-crossing asteroid, whose orbit crosses that of Mars. It orbits the Sun in the inner main-belt at a distance of 1.6–3.2 AU once every 3 years and 8 months (1,342 days). Its orbit has an eccentricity of 0.34 and an inclination of 24° with respect to the ecliptic.

The asteroid's observation arc begins two weeks after its official discovery with the first recorded observation at Lick Observatory on 22 November 1950.

== Physical characteristics ==
Wirt has been characterized as a stony S-type asteroid.

=== Rotation period ===
Between 2005 and 2010, several rotational lightcurve were obtained for this asteroid from photometric observations taken by astronomers Donald Pray, Petr Pravec, Peter Kušnirák, Walter Cooney, Rui Goncalves and Raoul Behrend, as well as at the Palomar Transient Factory. The lightcurves gave a well-defined rotation period between 3.689 and 3.690 hours with a brightness variation between 0.12 and 0.26 magnitude (U=n.a./3/3/3/3/2).

=== Satellite ===
During the photometric observations in December 2005, a minor-planet moon in orbit of Wirt was discovered. The binary asteroid has diameter ratio of 0.25, and the moon's orbital period is 18.97 hours. It measures approximately 1.89 kilometer in diameter.

=== Diameter and albedo ===
According to the survey carried out by the Infrared Astronomical Satellite IRAS, the asteroid measures 6.66 kilometers in diameter and its surface has an albedo of 0.19, while the Collaborative Asteroid Lightcurve Link assumes an albedo of 0.23 and calculates a diameter of 6.65 kilometers with an absolute magnitude of 13.1.

== Naming ==
It was named after American astronomer Carl Wirtanen (1910–1990), a discoverer of minor planets and comets, who was a long-time contributor of astrometric observations at Lick Observatory. It is one of the rare cases where the asteroid had been named after its discoverer. Wirtanen is known for several surveys conducted at Lick Observatory such as the Lick proper motion program with respect to galaxies and the Shane-Wirtanen survey. The official naming citation was published by the MPC on 1 January 1981 (M.P.C. 5688).
