= 1731 Smuts =

Main-belt asteroid

Discovery
- Discovered by: E. Johnson
- Discovery site: Johannesburg Obs.
- Discovery date: 9 August 1948

Designations
- Named after: Jan Smuts (Field Marshal; PM)
- Alternative designations: 1948 PH · 1926 TF; 1931 QA · 1935 FS; 1938 YB · 1941 KG; 1947 LC · 1948 PP; 1954 SX · 1960 WE; 1966 UY
- Minor planet category: main-belt · (outer)

Orbital characteristics
- Epoch 4 September 2017 (JD 2458000.5)
- Uncertainty parameter 0
- Observation arc: 90.22 yr (32,954 days)
- Aphelion: 3.5712 AU
- Perihelion: 2.7652 AU
- Semi-major axis: 3.1682 AU
- Eccentricity: 0.1272
- Orbital period (sidereal): 5.64 yr (2,060 days)
- Mean anomaly: 41.052°
- Mean motion: 0° 10^{m} 29.28^{s} / day
- Inclination: 5.9328°
- Longitude of ascending node: 152.48°
- Argument of perihelion: 203.73°

Physical characteristics
- Dimensions: 53.83 km (derived); 54.71±0.98 km 54.784±0.236; 57.491±0.432 km
- Synodic rotation period: 12.5±0.7 h
- Geometric albedo: 0.0385 (derived); 0.0534±0.0060; 0.058±0.010; 0.059±0.003
- Spectral type: C
- Absolute magnitude (H): 10.00 · 10.5

1731 Smuts, provisional designation 1948 PH, is a carbonaceous asteroid from the outer region of the asteroid belt, approximately 54 kilometers in diameter. It was discovered on 9 August 1948, by South African astronomer Ernest Johnson at Johannesburg Observatory in South Africa, who named it after Field marshal Jan Smuts.

== Classification and orbit ==
Smuts orbits the Sun in the outer main-belt at a distance of 2.8–3.6 AU once every 5 years and 8 months (2,060 days). Its orbit has an eccentricity of 0.13 and an inclination of 6° with respect to the ecliptic. First identified as 1926 TF in Heidelberg, Smuts's first used observation was taken one month later in November 1926, extending the body's observation arc by 22 years prior to its official discovery observation.

== Physical characteristics ==
Smuts has been characterized as a carbonaceous C-type asteroid.

=== Rotation period ===
In March 2008, a rotational lightcurve of Smuts was obtained from photometric observations by French amateur astronomer René Roy. It gave a rotation period of 12.5 hours with a brightness variation of 0.8 magnitude (U=2).

=== Diameter and albedo ===
According to the surveys carried out by the Japanese Akari satellite and NASA's Wide-field Infrared Survey Explorer with its subsequent NEOWISE mission, Smuts measures between 54.71 and 57.49 kilometers in diameter, and its surface has an albedo between 0.053 and 0.059. The Collaborative Asteroid Lightcurve Link derives an albedo of 0.0385 and a diameter of 53.83 kilometers based on an absolute magnitude of 10.5.

== Naming ==
This minor planet was named after prominent South African and British Commonwealth statesman, Field Marshal and philosopher, Jan Smuts (1870–1950), under whom the discoverer of the asteroid fought in both World Wars.

Smuts captured German South-West Africa in World War I and 0.0385 the only man to sign both of the peace treaties ending the First and Second World Wars. He served as prime minister of South Africa from 1919 until 1924 and again from 1939 until 1948. The official naming citation was published by the Minor Planet Center on 20 February 1976 (M.P.C. 3933).
