= A-type asteroid =

Asteroid class

A-type asteroids are relatively uncommon inner-belt asteroids that have a strong, broad 1 μm olivine feature and a very reddish spectrum shortwards of 0.7 μm. They are thought to come from the completely differentiated mantle of an asteroid, and appear to have a high density. One survey found that 7 similar A-, V- and X-type asteroids had an average density of 3.6 g/cm^{3}. A-type asteroids were once thought to be rare, but a 2026 study of data from the Gaia spacecraft showed that they were quite common among members of the Flora and Vesta asteroid families, with an overall abundance among all main belt asteroids of about 2%, significantly higher than earlier estimates.

== List ==
As of August 2024, 17 A-type asteroids had been discovered:

Designation	Class	Diam.	Refs
246 Asporina	main-belt	50.9 km	MPC · JPL
289 Nenetta	main-belt	37.6 km	MPC · JPL
446 Aeternitas	main-belt	53.6 km	MPC · JPL
863 Benkoela	main-belt	38.7 km	MPC · JPL
1126 Otero	main-belt	11.0 km	MPC · JPL
1600 Vyssotsky	main-belt	7.4 km	MPC · JPL
1951 Lick	Mars-crossing	5.6 km	MPC · JPL
2234 Schmadel	main-belt	9.5 km	MPC · JPL
2423 Ibarruri	Mars-crossing	4.9 km	MPC · JPL
2501 Lohja	main-belt	10.2 km	MPC · JPL
2715 Mielikki	main-belt	13.3 km	MPC · JPL
2732 Witt	main-belt	11.0 km	MPC · JPL
3352 McAuliffe	Amor	2.1 km	MPC · JPL
4142 Dersu-Uzala	Mars-crossing	7.1 km	MPC · JPL
4713 Steel	main-belt	6.3 km	MPC · JPL
4982 Bartini	main-belt	8.0 km	MPC · JPL
5641 McCleese	Mars-crossing	5.7 km	MPC · JPL
Diameter: averaged estimates only; may change over time

== See also ==
- Asteroid spectral types
