= 1126 Otero =

Main-belt asteroid

Discovery
- Discovered by: K. Reinmuth
- Discovery site: Heidelberg Obs.
- Discovery date: 11 January 1929

Designations
- Named after: Carolina Otero (Spanish courtesan)
- Alternative designations: 1929 AC · 1926 GD; 1948 RN_{1} · 1949 YO
- Minor planet category: main-belt · Flora

Orbital characteristics
- Epoch 4 September 2017 (JD 2458000.5)
- Uncertainty parameter 0
- Observation arc: 90.71 yr (33,133 days)
- Aphelion: 2.6052 AU
- Perihelion: 1.9394 AU
- Semi-major axis: 2.2723 AU
- Eccentricity: 0.1465
- Orbital period (sidereal): 3.43 yr (1,251 days)
- Mean anomaly: 291.09°
- Mean motion: 0° 17^{m} 15.72^{s} / day
- Inclination: 6.5045°
- Longitude of ascending node: 1.0892°
- Argument of perihelion: 136.08°

Physical characteristics
- Dimensions: 8.87±1.56 km 10.974±0.892 km 11.74 km (derived)
- Synodic rotation period: 3.648±0.002 h 3.64808±0.00014 h (Note: Pravec (2008) web: lightcurve plot of (1126) Otero by Petr Pravec of the Ondrejov Asteroid Photometry Project, with rotation period 3.64808±0.00014 hours and a brightness amplitude of 0.69 mag. Summary figures at Collaborative Asteroid Lightcurve Link and Pravec, P.; Wolf, M.; Sarounova, L. (2008))
- Geometric albedo: 0.1994 (derived); 0.37±0.13; 0.399±0.320
- Spectral type: SMASS = A · A
- Absolute magnitude (H): 11.41 · 11.57±0.05 (R) · 11.9 · 12.098±0.071 · 12.10

1126 Otero, provisional designation 1929 AC, is a Florian asteroid from the inner regions of the asteroid belt, approximately 10 kilometers in diameter. It was discovered on 11 January 1929, by German astronomer Karl Reinmuth at Heidelberg Observatory in southwest Germany. It was named after Spanish courtesan Carolina Otero.

== Classification and orbit ==
Otero is a member of the Flora family, one of the largest families of stony asteroids in the main belt. It orbits the Sun in the inner main-belt at a distance of 1.9–2.6 AU once every 3 years and 5 months (1,251 days). Its orbit has an eccentricity of 0.15 and an inclination of 7° with respect to the ecliptic. It was first identified as 1926 GD at Uccle/Heidelberg in 1926, extending the asteroid's observation arc by 3 years prior to its official discovery at Heidelberg.

== Physical parameters ==
In the SMASS classification, Otero is classified as an A-type asteroid.

=== Lightcurves ===
Two rotational lightcurve of Otero were obtained from photometric observations by astronomers Petr Pravec and Robert Stepens in February 2008. Lightcurve analysis gave a concurring, well-defined rotation period of 3.648 hours with a brightness variation of 0.69 and 0.70 magnitude, respectively (U=3/3).

=== Diameter and albedo ===
According to the survey carried out by NASA's Wide-field Infrared Survey Explorer with its subsequent NEOWISE mission, Otero measures 8.87 and 10.974 kilometers in diameter and its surface has an albedo of 0.37 and 0.399, respectively. The Collaborative Asteroid Lightcurve Link derives an albedo of 0.1994 and a diameter of 11.74 kilometers with an absolute magnitude of 12.098 from Petr Pravec's revised WISE-data.

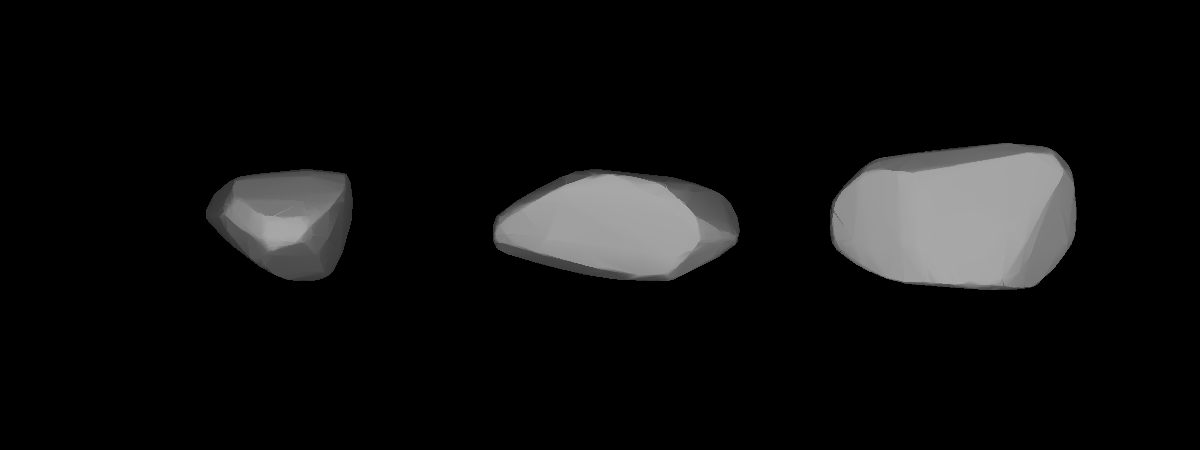
A lightcurve-based 3D-model of Otero

== Naming ==
This minor planet was named by the discoverer for Galician-born Spanish courtesan, dancer and actress Carolina Otero (1868–1965), who was also known as "La Belle Otero". During the Belle Époque, she was the most sought after woman in all of Europe and led an excessive life thanks to her numerous rich and famous lovers. The official naming citation was first published by the Astronomical Calculation Institute (RI 803).

== Space-based observations ==
Otero was observed by ESA's mission Hera from a distance of 2.8 million km on 11 May 2025, as the spacecraft was heading toward Didymos.
