= 46P/Wirtanen =

Jupiter-family comet

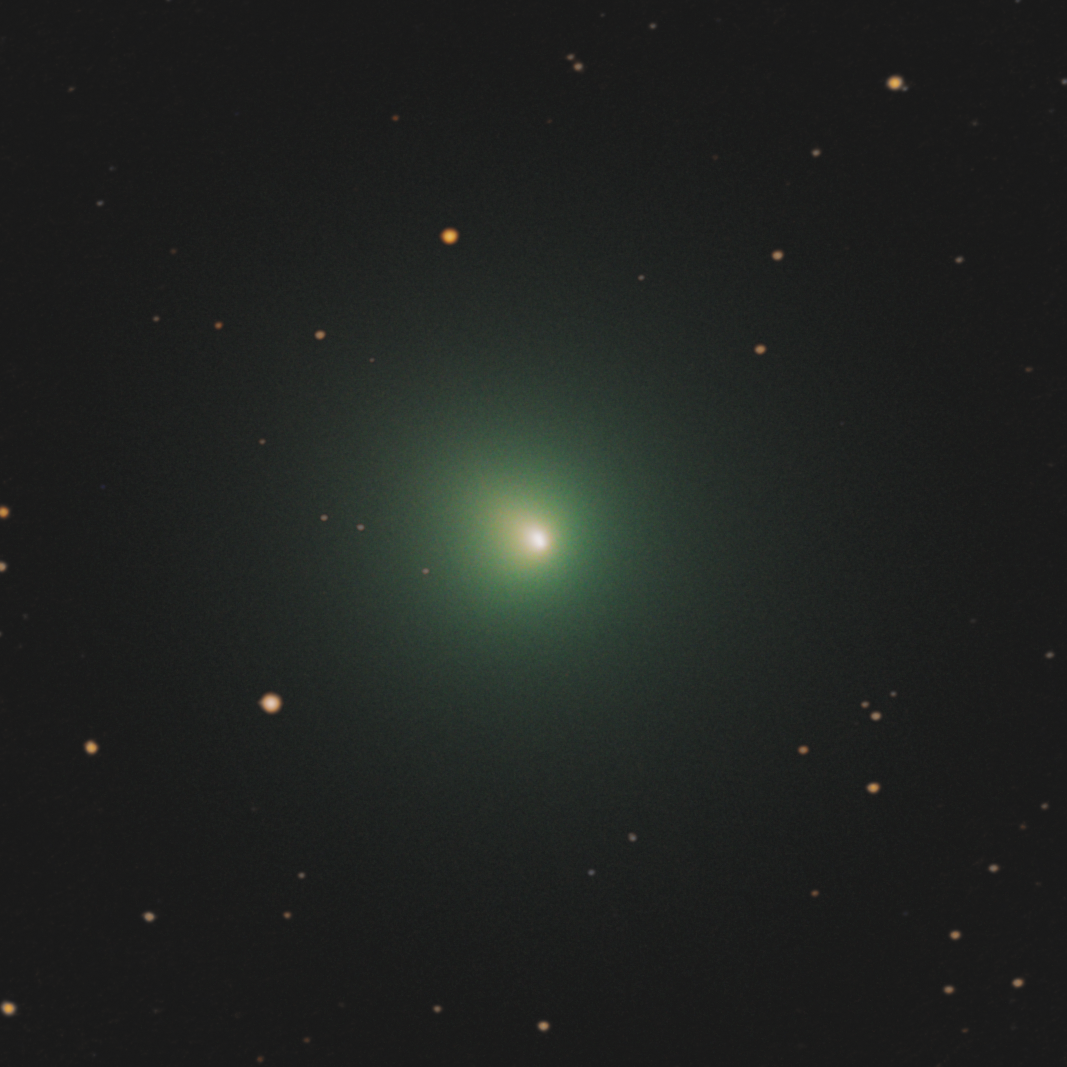
- Comet Wirtanen at perihelion on 12 December 2018

Discovery
- Discovered by: Carl A. Wirtanen
- Discovery site: Lick Observatory
- Discovery date: 17 January 1948

Designations
- MPC designation: P/1948 A1, P/1954 R2
- Alternative designations: 1947 XIII, 1954 XI; 1961 IV, 1967 XIV; 1974 XI, 1986 VI; 1991 XVI; 1948b, 1954j, 1960m; 1967k, 1974i, 1985q; 1991s

Orbital characteristics
- Epoch: 13 September 2023 (JD 2460200.5)
- Observation arc: 75.89 years (Note: Observation arc from the Minor Planet Center database covering dates from 17 January 1948 until 10 December 2023.)
- Number of observations: 7,527
- Aphelion: 5.127 AU
- Perihelion: 1.055 AU
- Semi-major axis: 3.091 AU
- Eccentricity: 0.65867
- Orbital period: 5.43 years
- Inclination: 11.749°
- Longitude of ascending node: 82.164°
- Argument of periapsis: 356.33°
- Mean anomaly: 314.77°
- Last perihelion: 19 May 2024
- Next perihelion: 27 October 2029
- T_{Jupiter}: 2.818
- Earth MOID: 0.071 AU (10.6 million km)
- Jupiter MOID: 0.169 AU (25.3 million km)

Physical characteristics
- Mean radius: 0.6 km (0.37 mi)
- Mean density: 510±70 kg/m^{3}
- Synodic rotation period: 7.9 hours 9.18±0.05 hours
- Spectral type: (B–V) = 0.756±0.009; (V–R) = 0.456±0.009; (R–I) = 0.366±0.009
- Comet total magnitude (M1): 16.6

Perihelion distance at different epochs
Epoch	Perihelion (AU)
1967	1.61
1974	1.26
1986	1.08
2013	1.05
2035	1.08
2046	1.22
2059	1.98
2095	2.01

46P/Wirtanen is a small Jupiter-family comet with a current orbital period of 5.4 years. It was the original target for close investigation by the Rosetta spacecraft, planned by the European Space Agency, but an inability to meet the launch window caused Rosetta to be sent to 67P/Churyumov–Gerasimenko instead. In December 2019, astronomers reported capturing an outburst of the comet in substantial detail by the TESS observatory. It was last observed in 2023 and will next come to perihelion in 2029.

== Discovery ==
46P/Wirtanen was discovered photographically on 17 January 1948, by the American astronomer Carl A. Wirtanen. The plate was exposed on January 15 during a stellar proper motion survey for the Lick Observatory. Due to a limited number of initial observations, it took more than a year to recognize this object as a short-period comet.

== Perihelion passages ==
The July 2013 perihelion passage was not favorable, only reaching a magnitude of 14.7. Between January 23 and September 26 of 2013, the comet had an elongation less than 20 degrees from the Sun.

On 16 December 2018, the comet passed 0.07746 AU (11.6 million km; 7.20 million mi; 30.1 LD) from Earth, marking one of the 10 closest comet flybys of Earth in the last 70 years. The comet reached an estimated magnitude of 3.9, making this pass the brightest one predicted, and the brightest close approach for the next 20 years. The comet experienced six outbursts, with the comet brightening by −0.2 to −1.6 magnitudes.

The 2018 close approach, combined with Wirtanen's brightness, provided an opportunity to study a potential future spacecraft mission target in detail. A worldwide observing campaign was organized to capitalize on the favorable circumstances of the 2018 apparition.

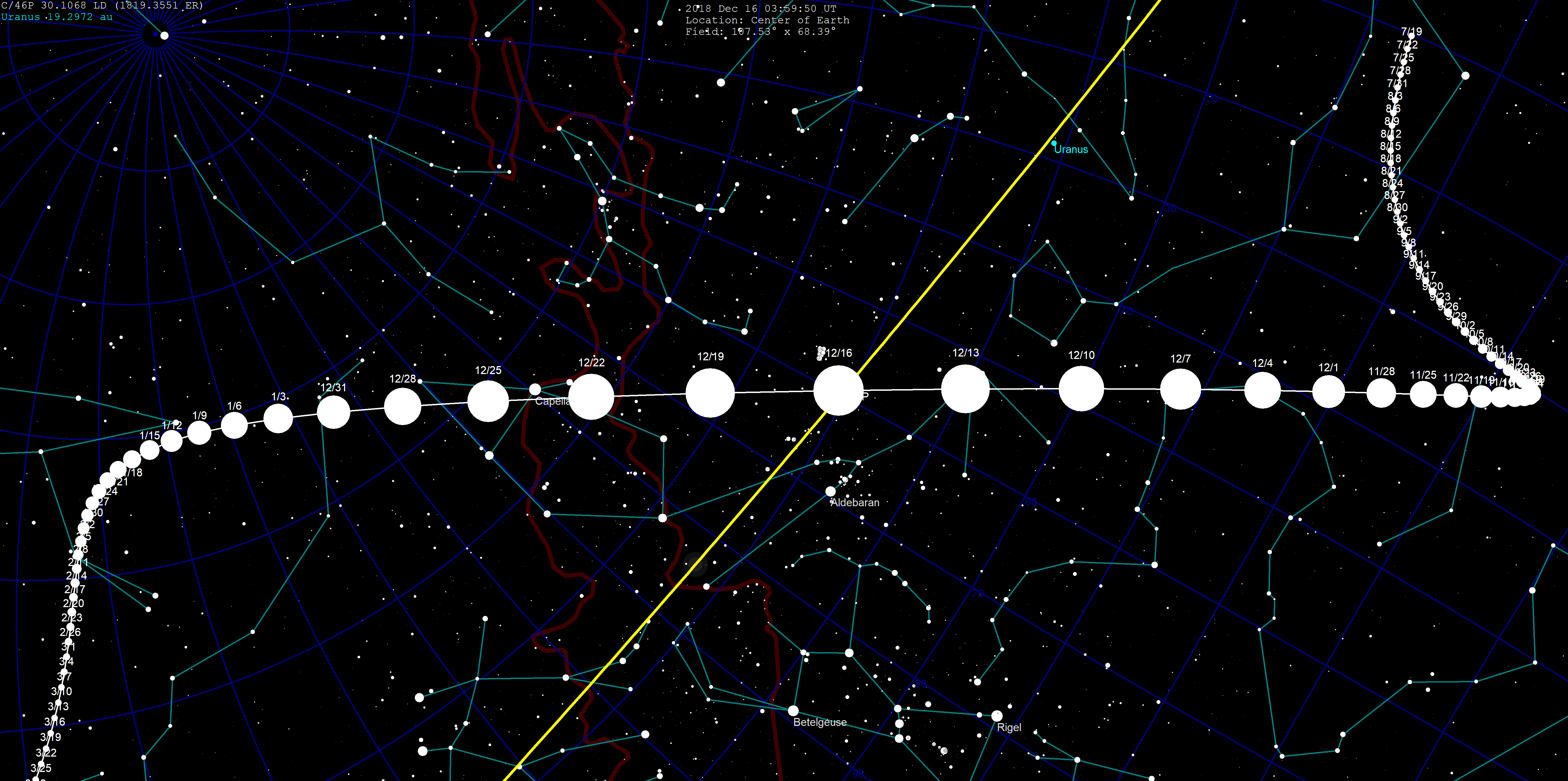
Path of 46P across the sky during 2018. Its size shown is inversely proportional to its distance.

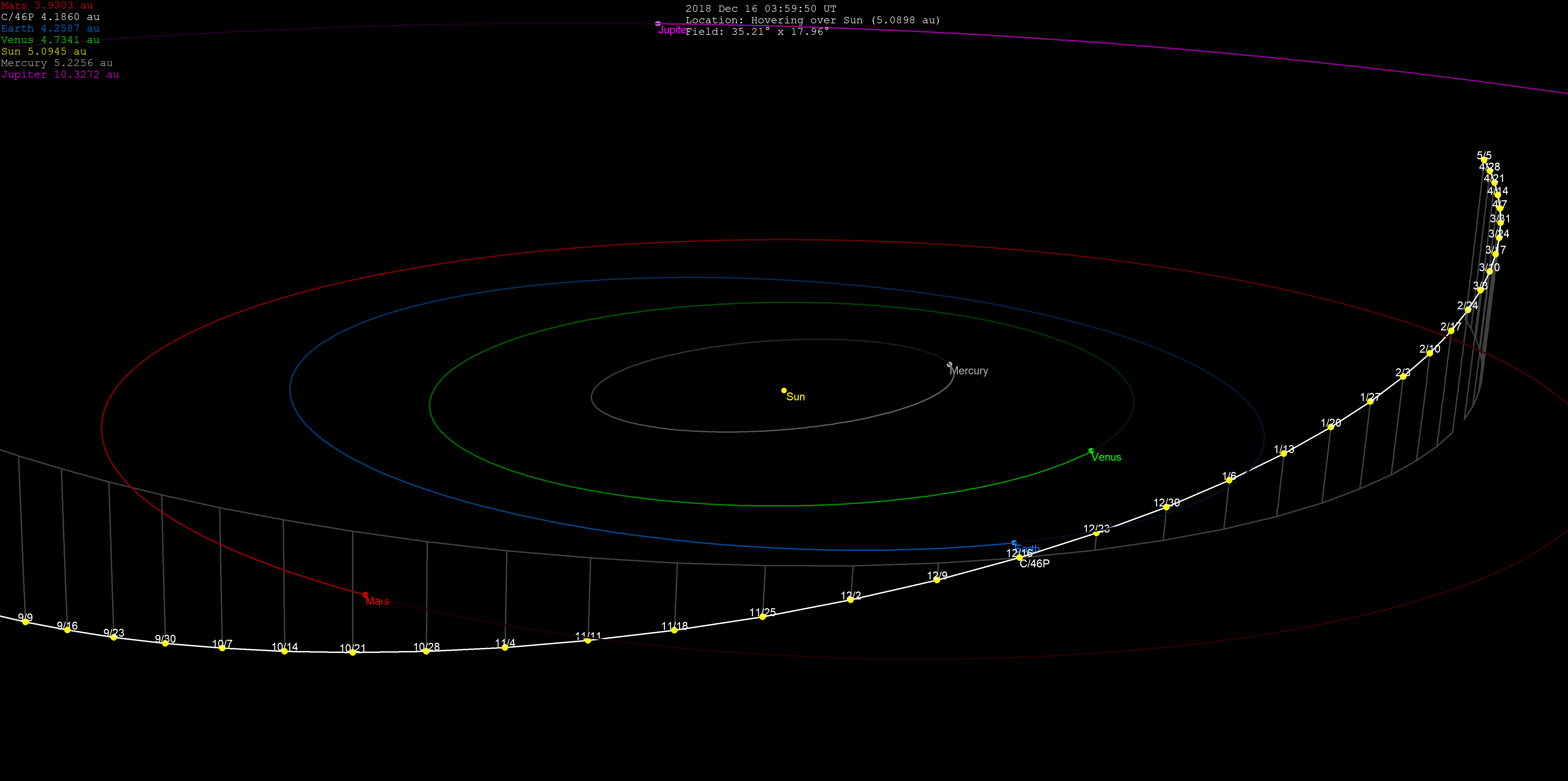
Orbital approach of 46P during 2018, moving south to north and crossing the ecliptic near its closest approach to Earth on December 16, 2018

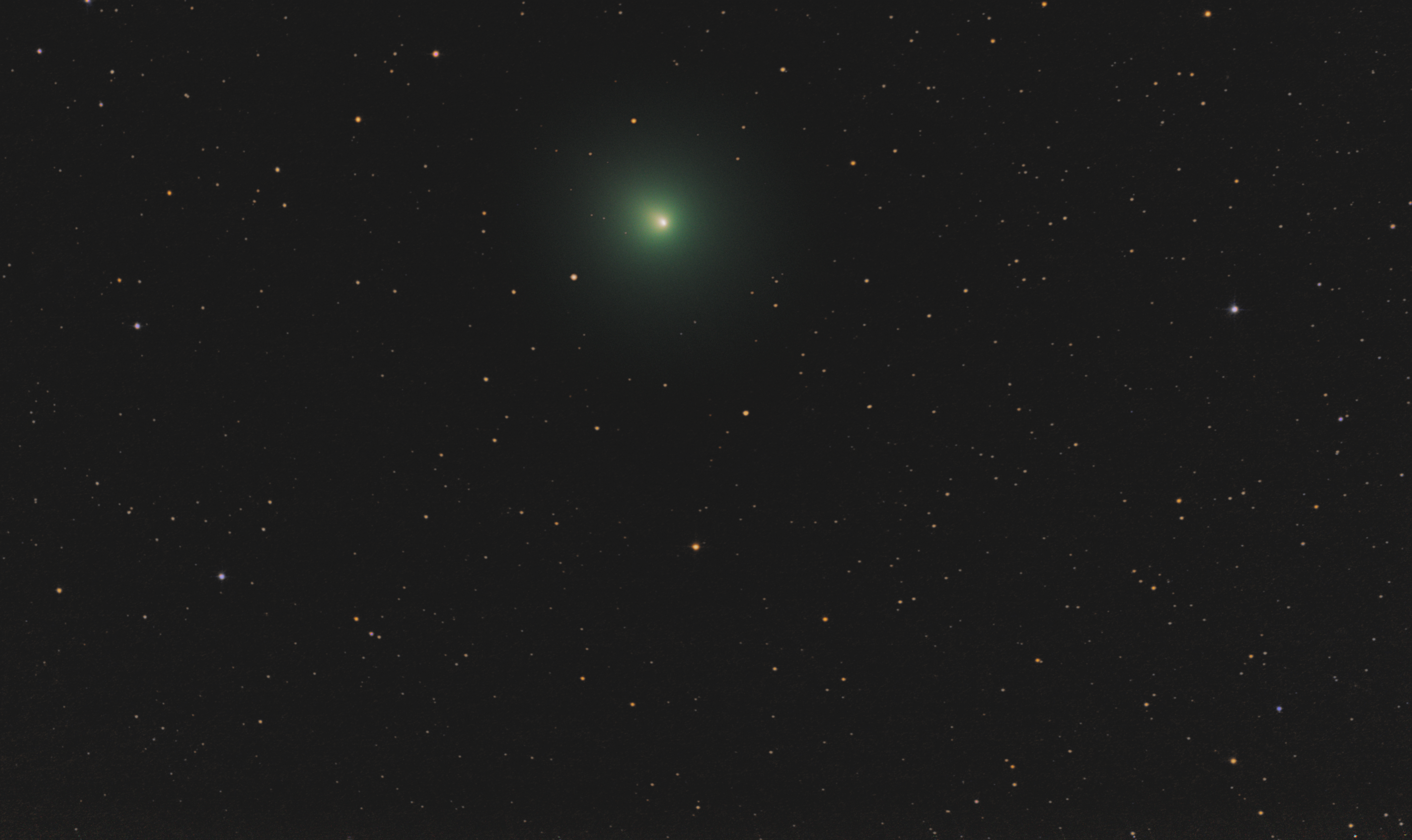
Amateur astronomical image of Comet 46P on 12 December 2018

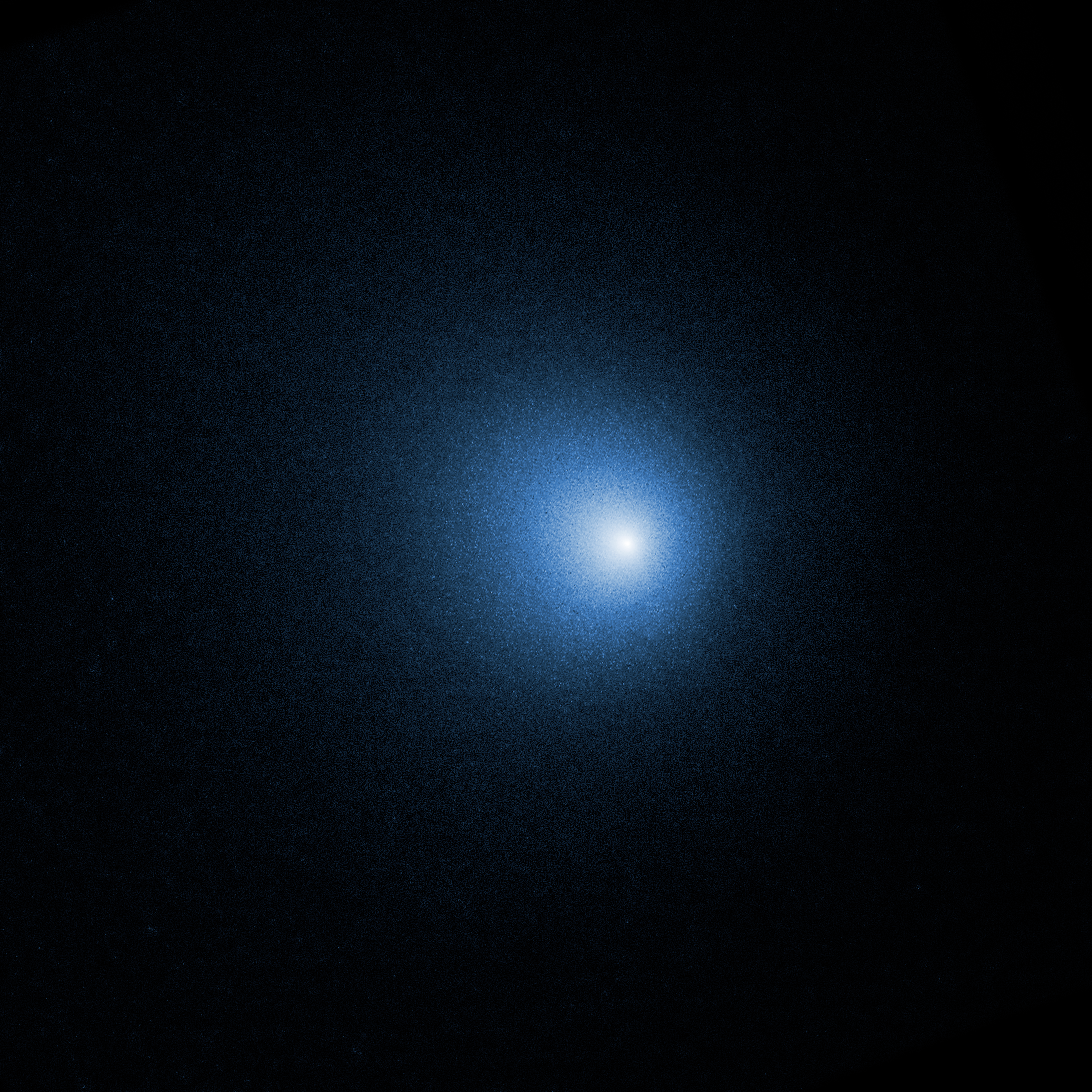
View from the Hubble Space Telescope on December 13, 2018

File:Animation of 46P/Wirtanen orbit
Sun · Mercury · Venus · Earth · Mars · Jupiter · 46P/Wirtanen

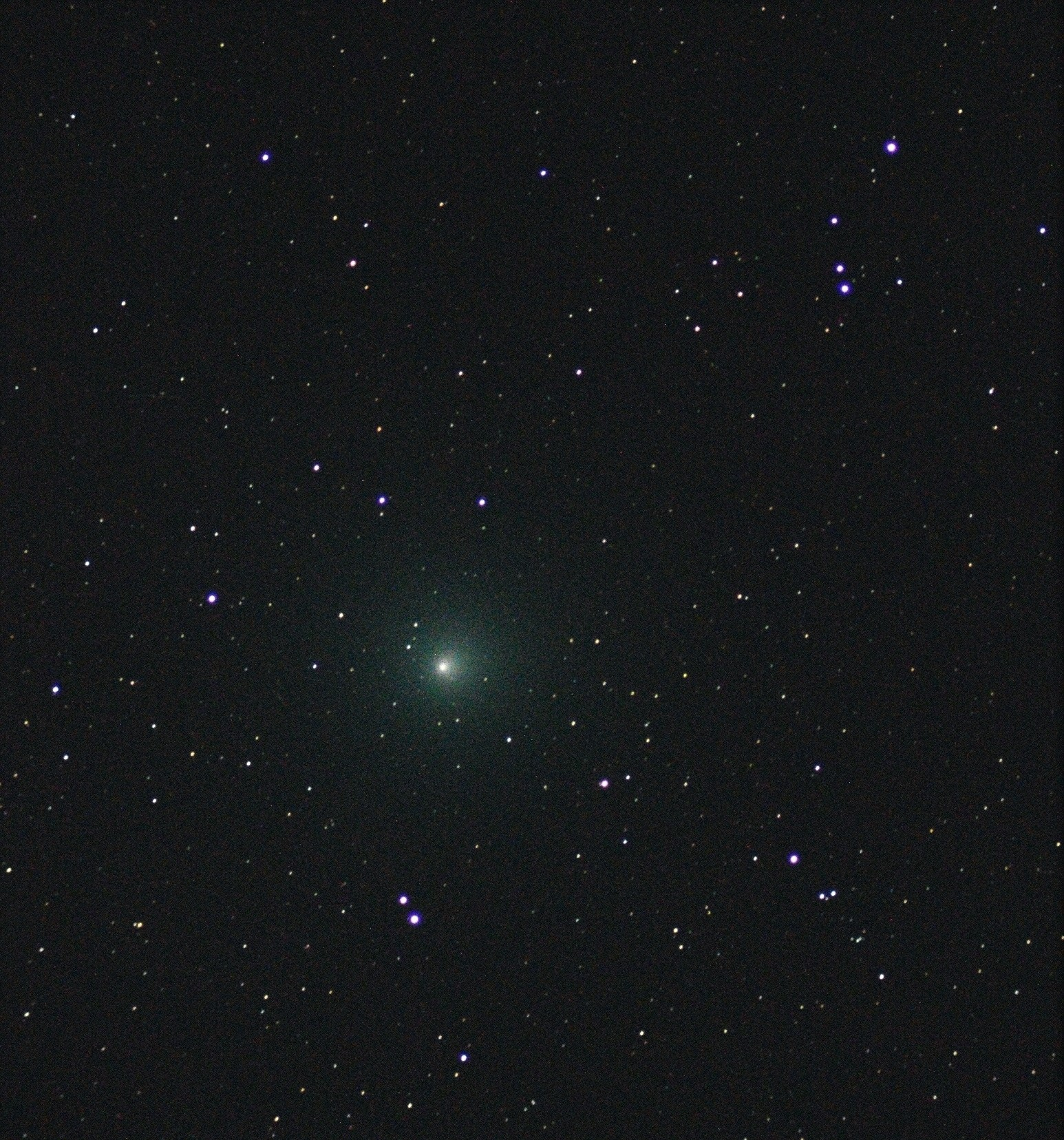
Comet 46P/Wirtanen photographed in the southern hemisphere, from Balcarce, Argentina.

== Exploration proposals ==
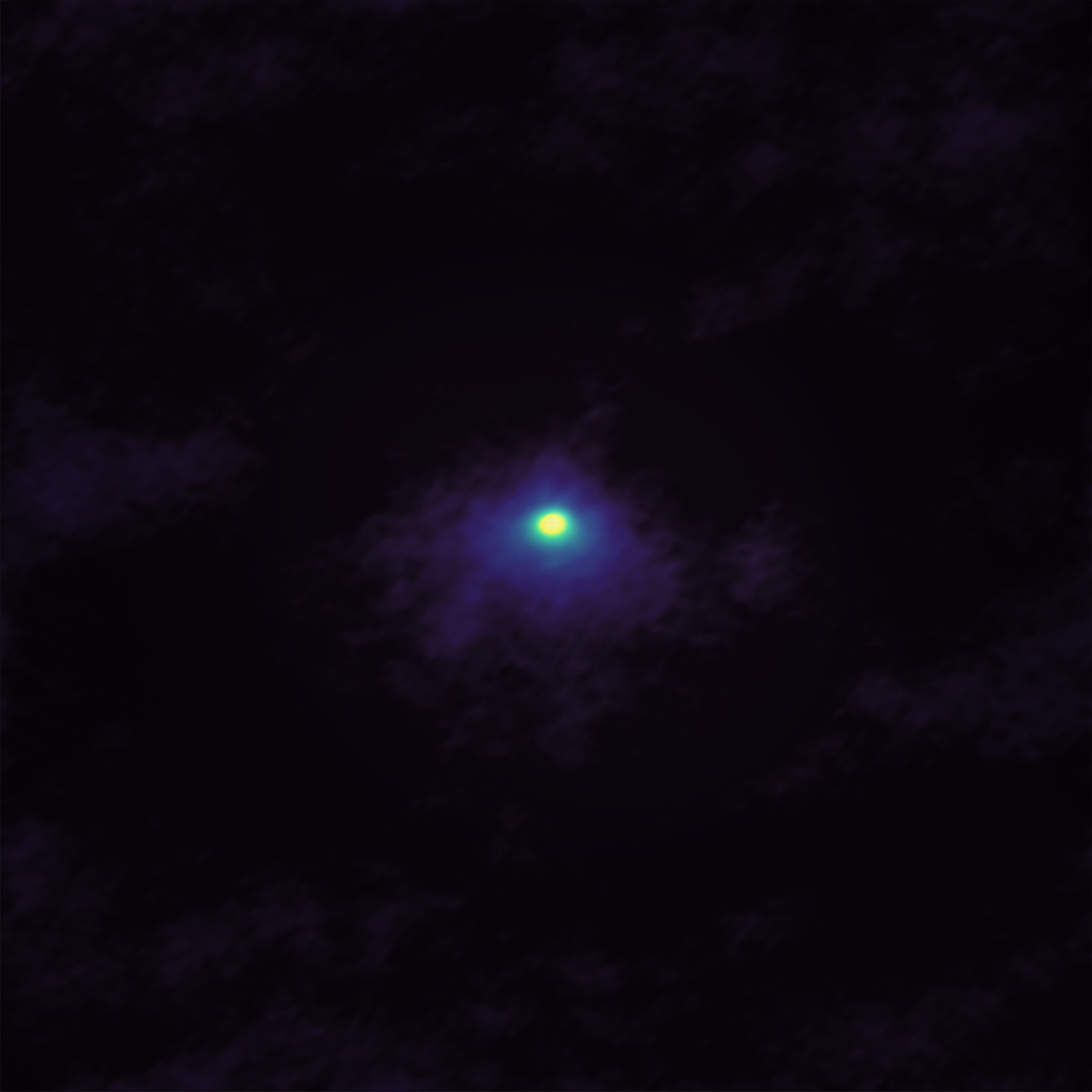
In December 2018, comet 46P/Wirtanen passed within 11.6 million kilometres of the Earth.

Radar image of 46P/Wirtanen imaged by the Arecibo Observatory in 2018.

The comet was the target for the proposed Comet Hopper mission, which reached the finalist stage in the NASA Discovery program. It was one of only three missions in that selection to have a more detailed study. The selection process was ultimately won in 2012 by the InSight mission, a Mars lander. The Comet Hopper was designed to use the ASRG, the Advanced Stirling Radioisotope Generator.

The Comet Hopper mission, had it been selected, would have had multiple science goals over the 7.3 years of its nominal lifetime. At roughly 4.5 AU (670 million km), the spacecraft would rendezvous with Comet Wirtanen and begin to map the spatial heterogeneity of surface solids as well as gas and dust emissions from within its coma. The remote mapping would also allow for any nucleus structure, geologic processes, and coma mechanisms to be determined. After arriving at the comet, the spacecraft would approach and land, then subsequently hop to other locations on the comet. As the comet approached the Sun, the spacecraft would land and hop multiple times. The final landing would occur at 1.5 AU. As the comet approached the Sun and became more active, the spacecraft would be able to record surface changes.

Also, 46P/Wirtanen was the original destination of the European Space Agency's Rosetta spacecraft mission, but launch delays meant that the comet was no longer easily reachable and another periodic comet, 67P/Churyumov–Gerasimenko, was chosen as the mission's target instead.

== Associated meteor showers ==
=== 2023 ===
Close approaches to Jupiter in 1972 and 1984 moved the comet's orbit closer to Earth, and as of epoch 2018 the comet has an Earth–MOID of 0.071 AU (10.6 million km). In 2023 Earth passed through a denser part of the 1974 meteoroid stream than Earth did in 2007. As a result a shower with radiant in the southern constellation of Sculptor was observed with a zenithal hourly rate (ZHR) of 0.65+0.24
−0.20 and was given the name λ-Sculptorids. The meteors made atmospheric entry (Ve) at a relatively slow 15 km/s (9.3 mi/s) and as a result the mean mass of the meteoroids observed was about 0.5 grams, about 10 times higher than that of other meteor showers.

Possible meteoroid stream activity
Date	Stream
2007	1974
2018	1980
2023-December-12 10:54 UT	1974

=== 2012 ===
Russian forecaster Mikhail Maslov had predicted that the Earth's orbit would cross Comet Wirtanen's debris stream as many as four times between December 10 and December 14, 2012. As there had not previously been an encounter with this debris stream, it was not certain whether or not a meteor shower would be visible from Earth, but there was speculation that a shower with as many as 30 meteors per hour might occur.

Observers in Australia reported that on the night of December 14, 2012, as many as a dozen meteors were seen emanating from the predicted radiant in the constellation of Pisces.

== Notes ==
Numbered comets
Previous; 45P/Honda–Mrkos–Pajdušáková	46P/Wirtanen	Next; 47P/Ashbrook–Jackson
