= Carl A. Wirtanen =

American astronomer

Minor planets discovered: 8
1600 Vyssotsky	October 22, 1947
1685 Toro	July 17, 1948
1747 Wright	July 14, 1947
1863 Antinous	March 7, 1948
1951 Lick	July 26, 1949
2044 Wirt	November 8, 1950
6107 Osterbrock	January 14, 1948
(29075) 1950 DA	February 22, 1950

Comets discovered: 5
C/1947 O1	July 18, 1947
46P/Wirtanen	January 17, 1948
C/1948 N1	July 15, 1948
C/1948 T1	October 7, 1948
C/1956 F1	March 16, 1956

Carl Alvar Wirtanen (November 11, 1910 – March 7, 1990) was an American astronomer and discoverer of comets and minor planets who worked at Lick Observatory. He was of Finnish ancestry.

Wirtanen was born in Kenosha, Wisconsin. After visiting the observatory in Kenosha with his violin teacher at age 12, he started grinding mirrors. Wirtanen joined the staff at Lick Observatory in 1941. During the Second World War, he took a job as a physicist at the California Institute of Technology and worked on ballistics at the Naval Ordnance Test Station in the Mojave Desert. He returned to Lick Observatory after the war, remaining there until his retirement in 1978.

Wirtanen discovered periodic comet 46P/Wirtanen, as well as eight asteroids, including notably the Apollo asteroid (29075) 1950 DA, which may have a non-negligible probability of impacting the Earth in the year 2880. He also discovered two other Apollo asteroids: 1685 Toro and 1863 Antinous. Based on the Shane–Wirtanen survey, the Shane Wirtanen Catalogue, a count of galaxies, was his major work published in 1954.

The asteroid 2044 Wirt, discovered by himself at Lick Observatory in 1950, was named in his honor in on 1 January 1981 (M.P.C. 5688). The name was proposed by his colleague Arnold Klemola.

Wirtanen died in Santa Cruz, California in 1990 following a lengthy illness. His remains were scattered at sea.
