= C/2015 V2 (Johnson) =

Parabolic comet

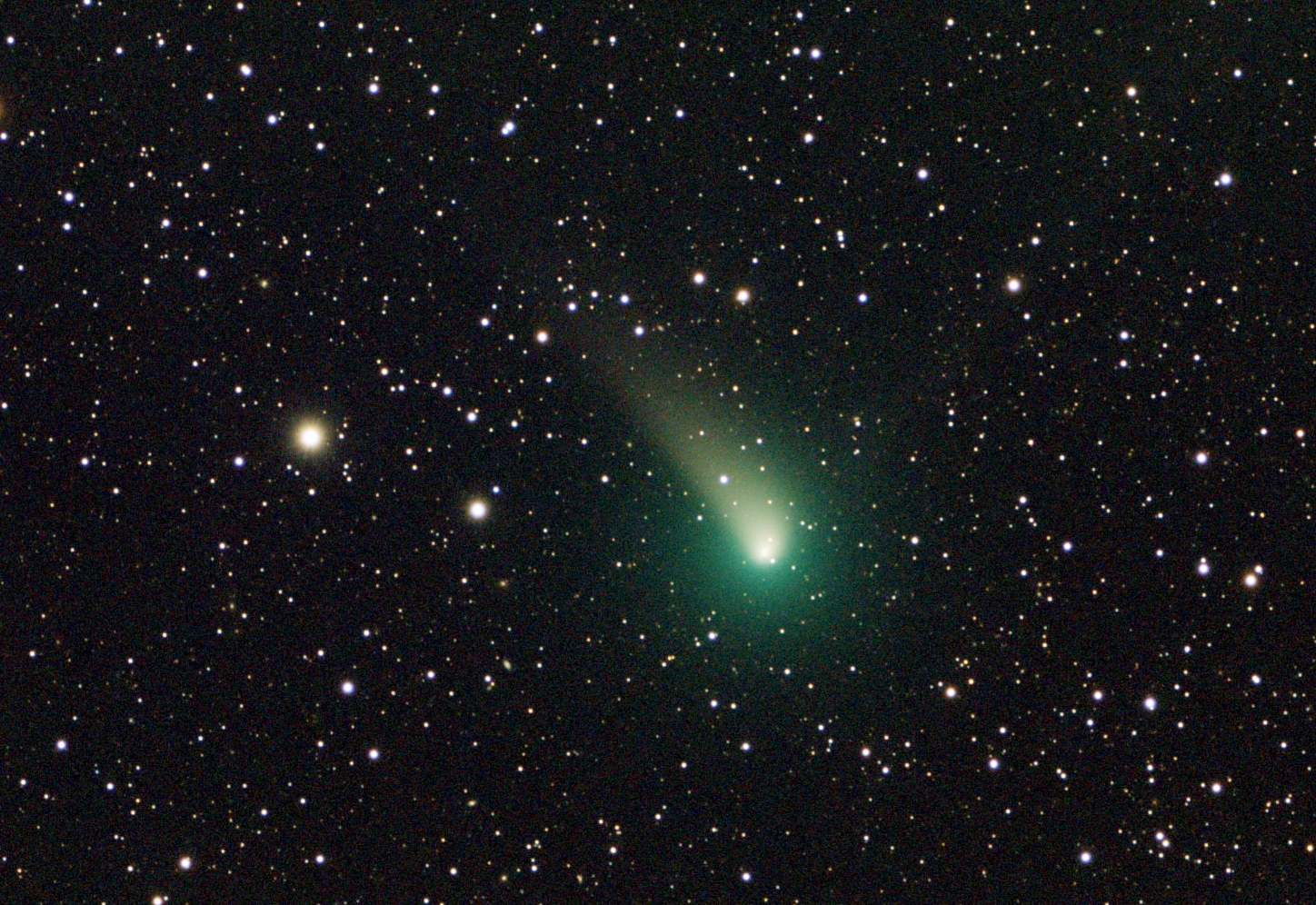
- Comet Johnson photographed by Kees Scherer on 3 April 2017

Discovery
- Discovered by: Jess A. Johnson
- Discovery site: Catalina Sky Survey (703)
- Discovery date: 3 November 2015

Orbital characteristics
- Epoch: 18 January 2017 (JD 2457771.5)
- Observation arc: 1,750 days (4.79 years)
- Number of observations: 5,886
- Perihelion: 1.637 AU
- Semi-major axis: 59,200 AU (inbound)
- Eccentricity: 1.00170
- Inclination: 49.875°
- Longitude of ascending node: 69.852°
- Argument of periapsis: 164.90°
- Mean anomaly: –0.005°
- Last perihelion: 12 June 2017
- Earth MOID: 0.642 AU
- Jupiter MOID: 3.349 AU

Physical characteristics
- Dimensions: 2.2–4.0 km (1.4–2.5 mi); 1.7 ± 0.14 km (1.056 ± 0.087 mi)
- Mean diameter: 3.0 km (1.9 mi)
- Mean density: 480±70 kg/m^{3}
- Comet total magnitude (M1): 10.0
- Comet nuclear magnitude (M2): 16.127±0.176
- Apparent magnitude: 7.1 (2017 apparition)

C/2015 V2 (Johnson) is a non-periodic comet discovered on 3 November 2015 by Jess Johnson (Catalina Sky Survey) at an apparent magnitude of 17.1 using a 0.68-meter (27 in) Schmidt–Cassegrain telescope. Its incoming orbit had a semimajor Axis of 59,200 AU (0.936 ly), but will have a hyperbolic trajectory after leaving the Solar System, with an eccentricity of 1.0009. The comet was expected to be able to be seen with binoculars in late May 2017 in the Northern Hemisphere, with a magnitude of 6 to 7, but the comet was fainter than predicted, reaching a magnitude of 7.1 on June 21.

== Physical characteristics ==
The comet was characterised by its very low activity, resembling a manx comet. The comet showed no emission from C_{2}, C_{3} and CN, which are part of the typical spectrum of comet, when it was 2,83 AU from the Sun, but they were detected when the comet reached 2,3 AU from the Sun. The comet was observed by the SWAN instrument onboard SOHO and determined its water production near perihelion was 10^{29}/s. Infrared spectroscopic observations indicated that the rotational temperature of the comet was warmer than predicted, indicating the presence of an icy grainy halo. The absolute nuclear magnitude was estimated to be 16.127±0.176, indicating that the effective radius of the comet was 1.7±0.138 km. The comet exhibited fan-shaped fine jets in the direction opposite of the Sun when imaged using polarimetry.
