= C/1935 A1 (Johnson) =

Long-period comet

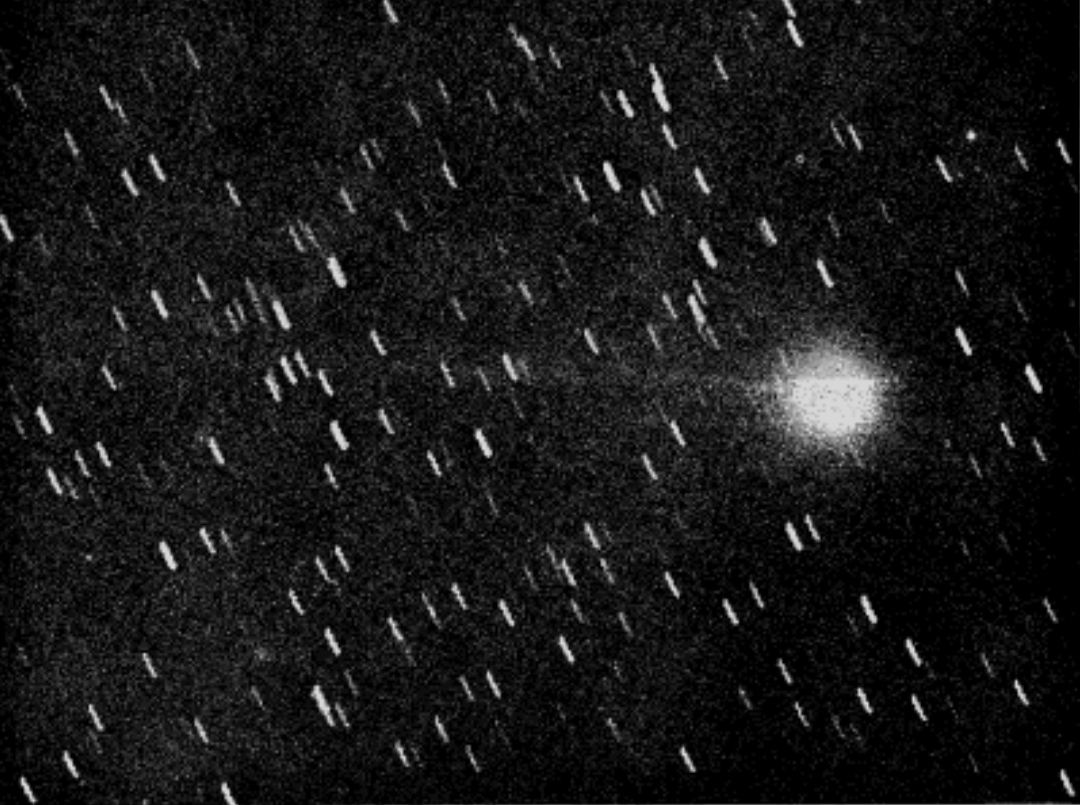
- Comet Johnson photographed by George van Biesbroeck shortly after perihelion on 27 February 1935

Discovery
- Discovered by: Ernest Leonard Johnson
- Discovery site: Union Observatory
- Discovery date: 7 January 1935

Designations
- Alternative designations: 1935a 1935 I

Orbital characteristics
- Epoch: 28 February 1935 (JD 2427861.5)
- Observation arc: 68 days
- Number of observations: 34
- Aphelion: ~190 AU
- Perihelion: 0.811 AU
- Semi-major axis: 93.21 AU
- Eccentricity: 0.99130
- Orbital period: ~900 years
- Inclination: 65.424°
- Longitude of ascending node: 92.445°
- Argument of periapsis: 18.399°
- Mean anomaly: 0.002°
- Last perihelion: 26 February 1935
- Next perihelion: ~2830s
- T_{Jupiter}: 0.519
- Earth MOID: 0.149 AU
- Jupiter MOID: 2.175 AU

Physical characteristics
- Comet total magnitude (M1): 9.5
- Comet nuclear magnitude (M2): 12.5
- Apparent magnitude: 8.4 (1935 apparition)

Johnson's Comet, formally designated as C/1935 A1, is a long-period comet with a 900-year orbit around the Sun. It is the first of four comets discovered by South African astronomer, Ernest Leonard Johnson.

== Orbit ==
Between February and March 1936, Allan D. Maxwell calculated that the comet had an orbital period of 750 years, later revised to 896 years. This is a follow-up to the preliminary parabolic solutions that were first calculated by J. P. Möller and H. Q. Rassumen a year prior.
