= JPL Science Division =

NASA space research organization

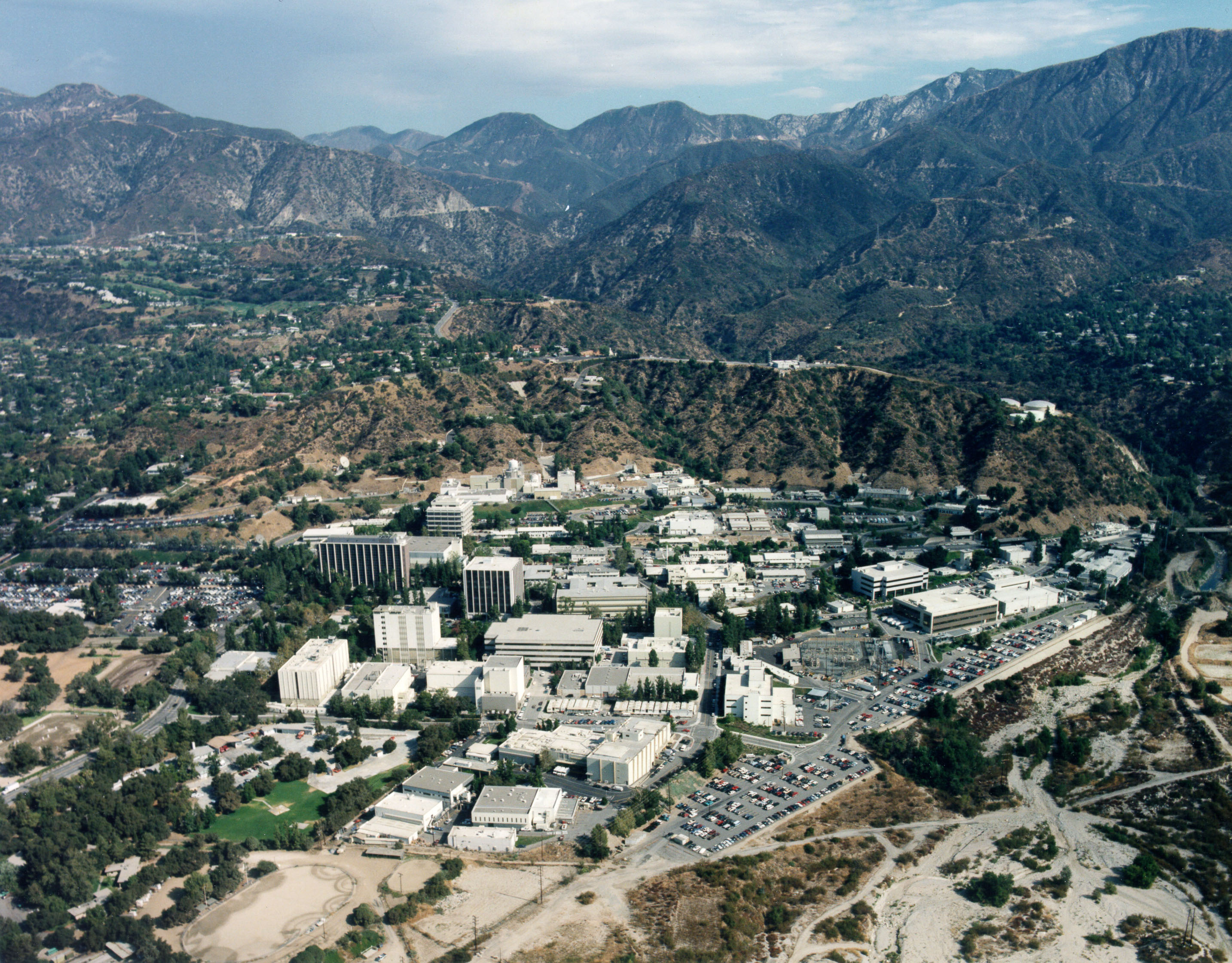
- Aerial view of JPL
- Established: October 31, 1936; 89 years ago
- Field of research: Terrestrial; Extraterrestrial
- Location: 4800 Oak Grove Drive, La Cañada Flintridge, California, United States; 34°12′6.1″N 118°10′18″W
- Parent department: Jet Propulsion Laboratory
- Operating agency: Managed for NASA by Caltech
- Website: science.jpl.nasa.gov

Map
- Location within California Location within the United States
- JPL Science Division

Division overview
- Division executives: Simon J. Hook, Division Manager; Janis L. Chodas, Director for Engineering and Science; Diane L. Evans, Director for Earth Science and Technology; Mark Simons, Chief Scientist; Fred Hadaegh, Chief Technologist

The Jet Propulsion Laboratory Science Division investigates physical and chemical processes on the Earth, in the Solar System, and throughout the universe. Explorations of space and terrestrial processes lead to understanding of the universe. Methods for accomplishing scientific work pertaining to the nature of the Earth, the Solar System, the galaxy, etc., are addressed in the JPL Science Division. Techniques in both physical and life sciences are utilized.

== Coverage ==
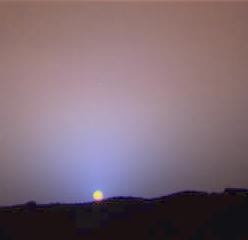
Mars sunset (Jet Propulsion Laboratory developed and manages the Mars Pathfinder mission for NASA's Office of Space Science)

Research areas include studying the nature of the Martian surface, the causes and mitigation of ozone depletion and global warming in Earth's atmosphere, the search for life in and the nature and evolution of the universe. These are significant issues related to NASA's mission.

Theoretical and experimental studies are conducted which lead to new missions. They are engaged in the development of new instrumentation and in the analysis of data, publishing new scientific knowledge, and in the communication of that knowledge to the general public.

Not all science at the Jet Propulsion Laboratory is contained within the Science Division. Approximately 30% of JPL scientists are embedded in other divisions.

== Charter and areas of research ==
JPL's charter is to conduct robotic space missions for NASA, to explore planetary systems, understand the origin and evolution of the universe and make critical measurements to understand the Earth, which leads to its protection. This is accomplished by developing multidisciplinary capabilities in engineering, science and technology. Research in space science, as well as advancing technologies, produces the ability to implement missions for NASA.

The division's science, technology and engineering research covers many areas of planetary, astrophysics and Earth science, both as basic research leading to new observations and mission concepts, as well as research based on the data acquired by JPL flight projects. Technology research covers areas ranging from robotic systems, a range of in-situ and remote sensing instruments, deep space communications and navigation, information systems, precision flying and planetary protection and survivability.

== Multidisciplinary capabilities ==
JPL has developed a number of capabilities to perform novel tasks with telerobotic and autonomous robotic technologies. For example, the JPL engineering team developed the Limbed Excursion Mechanical Utility Robot (LEMUR) to scale rock walls. It uses many hundreds of "tiny fishhooks in each of it 16 fingers" and employs artificial intelligence to work its way around obstacles in its path. LEMUR did field testing in Death Valley, California in early 2019, climbing "a route up a cliff while scanning the rock for ancient fossils from the sea that once filled the area."
