= C/1956 F1 (Wirtanen) =

Non-periodic comet

Discovery
- Discovered by: Carl A. Wirtanen
- Discovery site: Lick Observatory
- Discovery date: 16 March 1956

Designations
- Alternative designations: 1957 VI, 1956c

Orbital characteristics
- Epoch: 30 August 1957 (JD 2436080.5)
- Observation arc: 4.53 years
- Number of observations: 169
- Aphelion: ~116,000 AU (inbound); ~13,400 AU (outbound)
- Perihelion: 4.447 AU
- Semi-major axis: ~58,100 AU (inbound); ~6,700 AU (outbound)
- Eccentricity: 0.99992 (inbound); 0.99934 (outbound)
- Orbital period: ~14 million years (inbound); ~550,000 years (outbound)
- Inclination: 33.202°
- Longitude of ascending node: 233.66°
- Argument of periapsis: 13.259°
- Last perihelion: 2 September 1957

Physical characteristics
- Mean radius: ~14.0 km (8.7 mi)
- Mass: ~10e+14 kg
- Geometric albedo: 0.10 (assumed)
- Comet total magnitude (M1): 0.6–5.9
- Apparent magnitude: 10.5 (1957 apparition)

C/1956 F1 (Wirtanen) is a distant non-periodic comet that was observed from 1956 to 1960. It is the last of five comets discovered by American astronomer, Carl A. Wirtanen.

== Physical characteristics ==
In 1963, Elizabeth Roemer wrote in an abstract detailing that Wirtanen's nucleus fragmented into two distinct components sometime around 1 January 1957, about five months before van Biesbroeck first noticed the split nucleus, moving apart from each other at 1.5 m/sec. Zdenek Sekanina calculated that Wirtanen's original nucleus had an effective radius of around 14.0 km (8.7 mi) based on Roemer's findings. Comet Wirtanen's split nucleus was used in formulating a new calculation for determining the relative motion of split comets in 1977.

In 2023, upon revisiting the studies for C/1956 F1, Sekanina remarked that Roemer's original astrometric data for the comet remained unpublished and the timing of the split may have been miscalculated. He later concluded that the nucleus may have split around September 1954, moving apart at 0.26 m/sec. This indicated that Wirtanen may have likely discovered the larger fragment rather than its original nucleus, with the smaller one not being observed until it was spotted by van Biesbroeck over a year later.
