= Yale–Columbia Southern Observatory =

Yale-Columbia Station
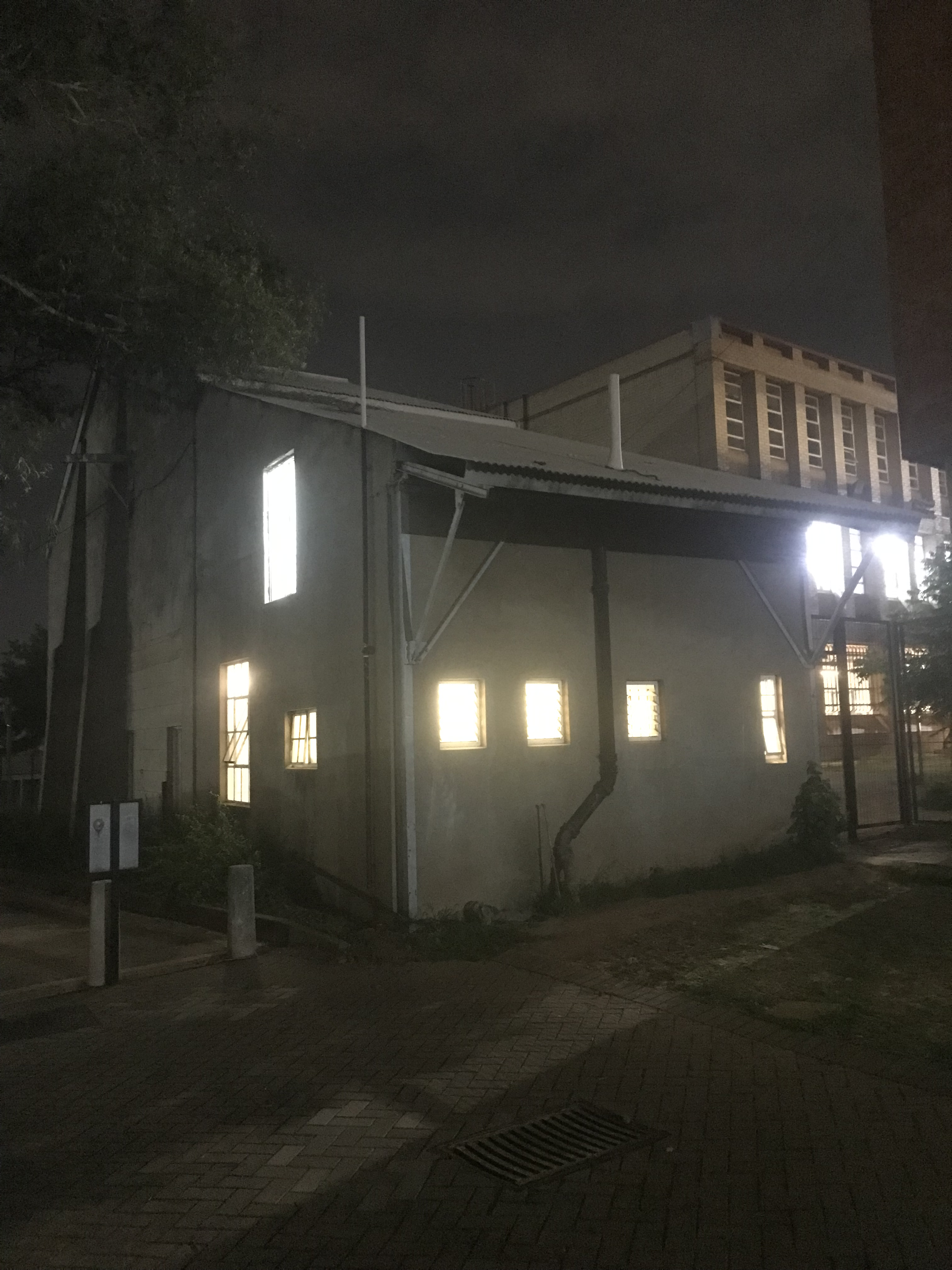
- Observatory code: 077
- Location: Johannesburg, City of Johannesburg Metropolitan Municipality, Gauteng, Transvaal region
- Coordinates: 26°11′14″S 28°01′45″E
- Altitude: 1,762 m (5,781 ft)
- Established: 1925
- Website: www.saao.ac.za/assa/html/his-obs-yale.html

·

The Yale Southern Observatory is an astronomical observatory established by Yale University in 1925 on Milner Park Show Grounds in Johannesburg, South Africa. The building would soon be incorporated into the campus of the University of the Witwatersrand, as campus expanded. Columbia University subsequently collaborated with Yale in the 1940s, and this facility became known as the Yale-Columbia Southern Observatory (YCSO).

The establishment of the southern observatory was initiated by Frank Schlesinger, director of the Yale University Observatory and publisher of the Bright Star Catalogue. Schlesinger wanted to determine the distances of southern stars, but he also wanted to do so economically. He sailed to South Africa with a 26-inch refractor, intended for the Yale Southern Telescope, and supervised the refractor's mounting. The refractor was housed in a meridian building and movement on either side of the meridian was restricted, resulting in large "dead zones", areas of the sky that are not available for observations. No residences were built near the meridian building to avoid light pollution. Intensive observations with this telescope, in conjunction with those at the Cape Observatory, made the knowledge of the distances of southern stars almost as complete as for northern stars. In 1951, the 23 year program for determining distances to stars in the Southern Hemisphere was completely completed. The observatory had fulfilled its primary function and, due to increasing urban light pollution, it was decided to close it. Today, the Wits planetarium is located on the territory next to the former Yale-Columbia Station. The Yale-Columbia refractor emigrated to Mount Stromlo Observatory in 1952. A Corporation was then spun out in 1962 under the name Yale-Columbia Southern Observatory, Inc. (YCSO) in collaboration with Columbia University.
