= 201 Penelope =

Main-belt asteroid

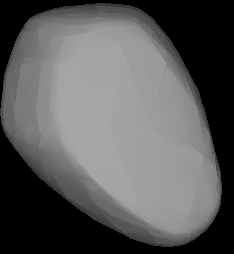
- A three-dimensional model of 201 Penelope based on its light curve.

Discovery
- Discovered by: Johann Palisa
- Discovery date: 7 August 1879

Designations
- Pronunciation: /pɪˈnɛləpiː/
- Named after: Penelópē
- Alternative designations: A879 PA; 1869 GA
- Minor planet category: Main belt
- Adjectives: Penelopean /pɪˈnɛloʊˈpiːən/

Orbital characteristics
- Epoch 21 January 2022 (JD 2457600.5)
- Uncertainty parameter 0
- Observation arc: 142.58 yr (52,077 d)
- Aphelion: 3.160 AU (472.710 Gm)
- Perihelion: 2.199 AU (329.009 Gm)
- Semi-major axis: 2.680 AU (400.859 Gm)
- Eccentricity: 0.17924
- Orbital period (sidereal): 4.39 yr (1,602.14 d)
- Average orbital speed: 18.19 km/s
- Mean anomaly: 169.01173°
- Mean motion: 0° 13^{m} 28.917^{s} / day
- Inclination: 5.75625°
- Longitude of ascending node: 156.91554°
- Argument of perihelion: 180.90559°
- Jupiter MOID: 2.23013 AU (333.623 Gm)
- T_{Jupiter}: 3.347

Physical characteristics
- Dimensions: 105 × 72 × 62 km
- Mean diameter: 85 ± 8 km
- Mass: (6.29±0.75)×10^{17} kg (Note: Calculated from its standard gravitational parameter GM = 0.042±0.005 km^{3}/s^{2}.)
- Mean density: 1.96±0.60 g/cm^{3} (calculated)
- Synodic rotation period: 3.7474 h (0.15614 d)
- Pole ecliptic longitude: 84°
- Pole ecliptic latitude: −15°
- Geometric albedo: 0.12 ± 0.01 (composite estimate); 0.1604±0.018; 0.0881±0.0187
- Spectral type: Tholen = M; SMASS = X; B–V = 0.720; U–B = 0.233
- Absolute magnitude (H): 8.38; 8.43; 8.5; 8.54

201 Penelope is a large main belt asteroid that was discovered by Austrian astronomer Johann Palisa on August 7, 1879, in Pola. The asteroid is named after Penelope, the wife of Odysseus in Homer's The Odyssey. It is orbiting the Sun at a distance of 2.68 AU with an eccentricity (ovalness) of 0.18 and a period of 4.381 years. The orbital plane is tilted at an angle of 5.8° to the plane of the ecliptic.

Based upon the spectra of this object, it is classified as a M-type asteroid, indicating it may be metallic in composition. It may be the remnant of the core of a larger, differentiated asteroid. Near infrared absorption features indicate the presence of variable amounts of low-iron, low-calcium orthopyroxenes on the surface. Trace amounts of water is detected with a mass fraction of about 0.13–0.15 wt%. It has an estimated size of around 85 km. With a rotation period of 3.74 hours, it is the fastest rotating asteroid larger than 50 km in diameter.
