= Ernest Leonard Johnson =

South African astronomer

- Born: 21 December 1891; Bloemfontein, Orange Free State
- Died: 1977 (aged 85–86); South Africa
- Education: Grey College
- Known for: Discovery of 4 comets and 18 Asteroids
- Spouse: Aisleen Devenish (married 1922)
- Awards: Donohoe Comet Medal
- Scientific career
- Fields: Astronomy
- Institutions: Union Observatory, Johannesburg

Minor planets discovered: 18
see § List of discovered minor planets

Ernest Leonard Johnson (1891–1977) was a South African astronomer and a former staff member of the Union Observatory in Johannesburg, South Africa. He is known for the discovery of 18 asteroids between 1946–1951, as well as several comets. On 25 August 1949, he discovered 48P/Johnson, a periodic comet expected to pass no closer than 1.2 to 1.3 AU from our planet in 2025. Johnson received the "Donohoe Comet Medal" twice before retiring in 1956. He died in 1977.

== Biography ==
Johnson was the son of William Johnson, a medical practitioner, and Rachel Sarah Joan Sanderson. He matriculated at Grey College, Bloemfontein, South Africa and started working on a mine but when his brother, Cecil Robert Johnson, was killed in a mining accident he applied for a position at the Union Observatory in Johannesburg, South Africa. He started work there as a learner astronomer in 1914.

He served in the armed forces of the Union of South Africa in World War I (1914-1918) during the campaign in German West Africa (now Namibia) but was sent home owing to illness. He recovered and went to England where he served as a bomber pilot for the Royal Flying Corps. After the war he returned to the Union Observatory and remained there for the rest of his career.

Johnson produced star maps of the sky south of 19 degrees south declination, in collaboration with Harry Edwin Wood. In January 1935 he discovered a faint comet, that was visible for less than two months, while searching the sky in declination 52 degrees south. This comet was named Johnson's comet 1935. He discovered a second comet in 1948.

Between August 1946 and July 1951, Johnson also discovered 18 asteroids, the most important of which was named 1580 Betulia. This asteroid was discovered on 22 May 1950 during its close approach to the earth. From 1921 to 1953, his observations of the asteroids and more than 30 comets were published in the Circular of the Union Observatory, Johannesburg.

Johnson was a member of the Astronomical Society of Southern Africa and contributed to the society's Monthly Notes.

== List of discoveries ==
=== Comets ===
Discoveries of comets include:

- C/1935 A1 on 8 January 1935 (Comet a 1935)
- C/1948 R1 on 1 September 1948 (Comet 1948 j)
- 48P/Johnson on 25 August 1949
- C/1949 K1 on 20 May 1949 (Comet 1949 a and/or 1949 d)

=== Asteroids ===
Johnson is credited by the Minor Planet Center with the discovery of 18 asteroids:.

1568 Aisleen	21 August 1946	list
1580 Betulia	22 May 1950	list
1585 Union	7 September 1947	list
1607 Mavis	3 September 1950	list
1609 Brenda	10 July 1951	list
1618 Dawn	5 July 1948	list
1623 Vivian	9 August 1948	list
1731 Smuts	9 August 1948	list
1760 Sandra	10 April 1950	list

1819 Laputa	9 August 1948	list
1885 Herero	9 August 1948	list
1922 Zulu	25 April 1949	list
2546 Libitina	23 March 1950	list
2651 Karen	28 August 1949	list
2718 Handley	30 July 1951	list
2829 Bobhope	9 August 1948	list
3184 Raab	22 August 1949	list
5038 Overbeek	31 May 1948	list

== Private life ==
In 1922 Johnson married Aisleen Devenish, with whom he had a daughter and a son. He retired from the observatory in December 1951 but continued to work until 1956, during which time he tested potential astronomical sites with portable reflecting telescopes for the European Southern Observatory Organisation.

== See also ==
- List of minor planet discoverers § E. L. Johnson
