= Samuel Herrick (astronomer) =

American astronomer

Samuel Herrick (May 29, 1911 – March 20, 1974) was an American astronomer who specialized in celestial mechanics and made important studies preceding the development of crewed space flight.

== Life ==
Herrick was born in Madison County, Virginia, in 1911.

In 1931 Herrick began corresponding with rocket scientist Robert H. Goddard. Goddard was a physicist whose ultimate goal was crewed and uncrewed space travel. Herrick asked if he should work in this new field which he named astrodynamics. Herrick said that Goddard had the vision to encourage him "to anticipate the basic problems of space navigation." As early as 1936, he had developed a plan for using mathematics and celestial mechanics to solve such problems. Two decades later America had the navigational methods needed to fly Earth satellites and to travel to the Moon and back.

In 1946 he worked with P. V. H. Weems to found the Institute of Navigation. He was president of this organization from 1951-53.

In the late 1940s, Herrick began a one year course at UCLA on rocket navigation. In his mimeographed text book titled Rocket Navigation, copyright 1948-1951, he reworked the classical formulas of celestial mechanics to be more useful in the space age.

In the early 1950s the enrollment in this course was around 6, but after Sputnik (1957), it was made a night class and the enrollment jumped to around 35, mostly local aeronautical engineers.

One of the world's foremost leaders in celestial mechanics gave this reminiscence of Herrick: “If he had a fault, it was that he was a perfectionist. His opus magnus [sic] on celestial mechanics and Astro-Dynamics which grew naturally from his lectures, was undoubtedly delayed ten years in its eventual publication by this fault. If every detail was not entirely up to his self-imposed standard, it could not pass muster. He strove to imbue in his students this same critical attitude towards their work. Sam will be remembered as one who strove assiduously for the things in which he believed.”

More details of the life and work of this descendant of the poet Robert Herrick are to be found in the Journal: Quarterly Journ. Roy. Astron. Soc., Vol. 16, p. 321 - 322 written by his colleague Donald Sadler. In 1960, the USC Professor and author Shirley Thomas wrote a chapter about Samuel Herrick in her book series, Men of space; profiles of the leaders in space research, development, and exploration.
