= 48P/Johnson =

Periodic comet

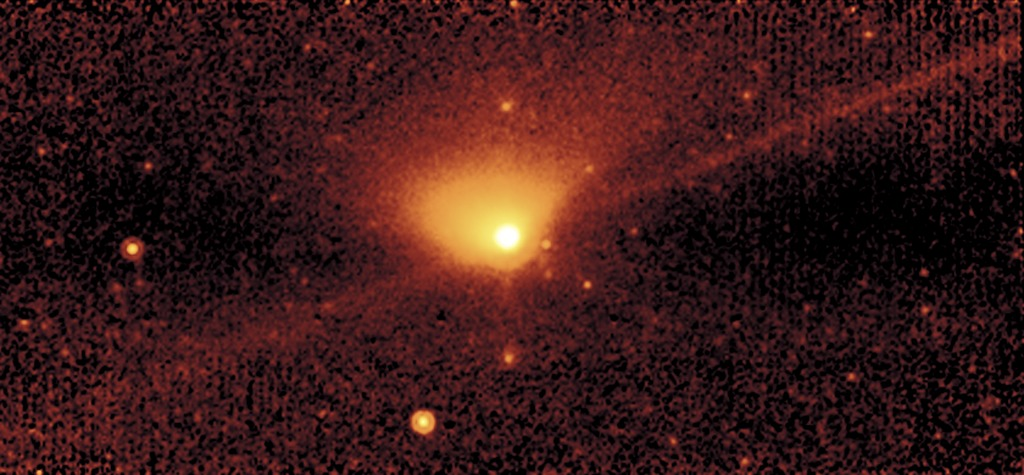
- Infrared image of Comet Johnson taken by the Spitzer Space Telescope on 18 July 2005

Discovery
- Discovered by: Ernest Leonard Johnson
- Discovery date: 25 August 1949

Designations
- MPC designation: P/1949 Q1, P/1956 P1
- Alternative designations: 1949 II, 1956 V, 1963 IV; 1970 IV, 1977 I; 1983 XVIII, 1990 XXIII

Orbital characteristics
- Epoch: 28 April 2016 (JD 2457506.5)
- Observation arc: 76.48 years (Note: Observation arc from the Minor Planet Center database only covered dates from 24 September 1949 until 15 February 2026 (76.39 years). This figure includes its entire arc up to 25 August 1949.)
- Number of observations: 3,111
- Aphelion: 5.021 AU
- Perihelion: 2.006 AU
- Semi-major axis: 3.514 AU
- Eccentricity: 0.42897
- Orbital period: 6.587 years
- Inclination: 12.283°
- Longitude of ascending node: 111.46°
- Argument of periapsis: 214.69°
- Mean anomaly: 235.39°
- Last perihelion: 2 March 2025
- Next perihelion: 29 September 2031
- T_{Jupiter}: 2.931
- Earth MOID: 1.007 AU
- Jupiter MOID: 0.513 AU

Physical characteristics
- Dimensions: 6.0 × 4.4 km (3.7 × 2.7 mi)
- Mean diameter: 5.74 km (3.57 mi)
- Synodic rotation period: 29 hours
- Comet total magnitude (M1): 8.9
- Comet nuclear magnitude (M2): 13.4

48P/Johnson is a periodic comet in the Solar System.

The comet's nucleus is estimated to be approximately 5.74 km (3.57 mi) in diameter, according to Lamy, Fernandez, and Weaver. David C. Jewitt and Scott S. Sheppard, however, estimate the nucleus to have dimensions of 6.0 × 4.4 km (3.7 × 2.7 mi).

== Notes ==
Numbered comets
Previous; 47P/Ashbrook–Jackson	48P/Johnson	Next; 49P/Arend–Rigaux
