= 1337 Gerarda =

Main-belt asteroid

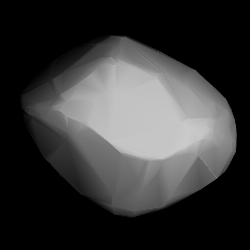
- Modelled shape of Gerarda from its lightcurve

Discovery
- Discovered by: H. van Gent
- Discovery site: Johannesburg Obs.
- Discovery date: 9 September 1934

Designations
- Named after: Gerarda Prins (wife of astronomer)
- Alternative designations: 1934 RA_{1} · 1942 EE_{1}
- Minor planet category: main-belt · (outer) background

Orbital characteristics
- Epoch 4 September 2017 (JD 2458000.5)
- Uncertainty parameter 0
- Observation arc: 83.06 yr (30,337 days)
- Aphelion: 3.1978 AU
- Perihelion: 2.6247 AU
- Semi-major axis: 2.9113 AU
- Eccentricity: 0.0984
- Orbital period (sidereal): 4.97 yr (1,814 days)
- Mean anomaly: 257.78°
- Mean motion: 0° 11^{m} 54.24^{s} / day
- Inclination: 17.979°
- Longitude of ascending node: 160.29°
- Argument of perihelion: 201.86°

Physical characteristics
- Dimensions: 35.56±11.35 km 38.84 km (derived); 38.86±3.6 km 40.875±0.305 km 40.91±0.49 km 41.53±0.48 km 43.22±12.45 km 46.464±0.379 km
- Mass: (1.20±0.40)×10^{18} kg (Note: Calculated from its standard gravitational parameter GM = 0.080±0.027 km^{3}/s^{2}.)
- Mean density: 33.68 g/cm^{3} (Note: Assuming a diameter of 40.9 km.)
- Synodic rotation period: 12.462±0.0145 h 12.52 h
- Geometric albedo: 0.0297±0.0042; 0.03±0.02; 0.034±0.007; 0.04±0.04; 0.042±0.001; 0.0425 (derived); 0.0441±0.010
- Spectral type: P · X C (assumed)
- Absolute magnitude (H): 10.88±0.45 · 10.970±0.001 (R) · 11.06 · 11.10 · 11.20 · 11.29

1337 Gerarda, provisional designation 1934 RA_{1}, is a dark background asteroid from the outer regions of the asteroid belt, approximately 40 kilometers in diameter. It was discovered on 9 September 1934, by Dutch astronomer Hendrik van Gent at the Union Observatory in Johannesburg, South Africa. The asteroid was named after Gerarda Prins, the wife of an orbit computer at Leiden Observatory.

== Orbit and classification ==
Gerarda is a non-family asteroid from the main belt's background population. It orbits the Sun in the outer main-belt at a distance of 2.6–3.2 AU once every 4 years and 12 months (1,814 days; semi-major axis of 2.91 AU). Its orbit has an eccentricity of 0.10 and an inclination of 18° with respect to the ecliptic.

The body's observation arc begins with its official discovery observation at Johannesburg.

== Physical characteristics ==
Gerarda has been characterized as a dark and primitive P-type asteroid by the Wide-field Infrared Survey Explorer (WISE). It has also been classified as an X-type asteroid by Pan-STARRS photometric survey, while the Collaborative Asteroid Lightcurve Link (CALL) assumes it to be a carbonaceous C-type asteroid.

=== Rotation period ===
In November 1984, a first rotational lightcurve of Gerarda was obtained from photometric observations by American astronomer Richard Binzel. Lightcurve analysis gave a rotation period of 12.52 hours with a brightness variation of 0.23 magnitude (U=2). A similar period of 12.462 with an identical amplitude of 0.23 was measured by astronomers at the Palomar Transient Factory in June 2012 (U=2).

=== Diameter and albedo ===
According to the surveys carried out by the Infrared Astronomical Satellite IRAS, the Japanese Akari satellite and the NEOWISE mission of NASA's WISE telescope, Gerarda measures between 35.56 and 46.464 kilometers in diameter and its surface has an albedo between 0.0297 and 0.0441.

CALL derives an albedo of 0.0425 and a diameter of 38.84 kilometers based on an absolute magnitude of 11.10.

== Naming ==
This minor planet was named by Dutch astronomer Gerrit Pels, who computed this asteroid's orbit. It was named after Gerarda Prins, the wife of G. Prins, an orbit computer at Leiden Observatory. The author of the Dictionary of Minor Planet Names, Lutz Schmadel, learned about the naming circumstances from Ingrid van Houten-Groeneveld, who was herself a long-time staff member at the Leiden Observatory.
