= 1133 Lugduna =

Main-belt asteroid

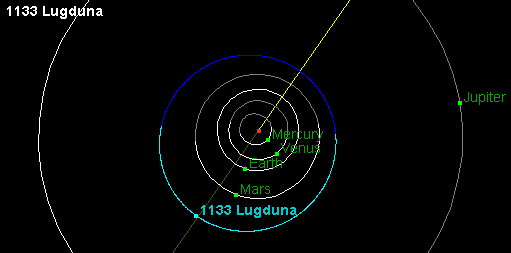
- Orbit of 1133 Lugduna

Discovery
- Discovered by: H. van Gent
- Discovery site: Johannesburg Obs. (Leiden Southern Station)
- Discovery date: 13 September 1929

Designations
- Named after: Dutch city of Leiden (Lugdunum Batavorum)
- Alternative designations: 1929 RC_{1} · A908 BD
- Minor planet category: main-belt · Flora

Orbital characteristics
- Epoch 4 September 2017 (JD 2458000.5)
- Uncertainty parameter 0
- Observation arc: 87.20 yr (31,848 days)
- Aphelion: 2.5966 AU
- Perihelion: 1.7751 AU
- Semi-major axis: 2.1858 AU
- Eccentricity: 0.1879
- Orbital period (sidereal): 3.23 yr (1,180 days)
- Mean anomaly: 67.197°
- Mean motion: 0° 18^{m} 18^{s} / day
- Inclination: 5.3765°
- Longitude of ascending node: 58.230°
- Argument of perihelion: 306.74°

Physical characteristics
- Dimensions: 8.275±0.019 km 9.100±0.037 km 9.76 km (calculated); 10.47±0.70 km
- Synodic rotation period: 5 h (Note: Franco(2011) web: observation date: 6 November 2010. Rotation period 5 hours with a brightness amplitude of 0.33 mag. Quality Code of 2-. Summary figures for (1133) Lugduna at Collaborative Asteroid Lightcurve Link (CALL)); 5.477±0.001 h 5.478±0.005 h
- Geometric albedo: 0.208±0.029; 0.24 (assumed); 0.2798±0.0550; 0.363±0.029
- Spectral type: Tholen = S B–V = 0.880; U–B = 0.510
- Absolute magnitude (H): 12.22 · 12.45±0.50

1133 Lugduna, provisional designation 1929 RC_{1}, is a stony Florian asteroid from the inner regions of the asteroid belt, approximately 9.5 kilometers in diameter. It was discovered on 13 September 1929, by Dutch astronomer Hendrik van Gent at the Leiden Southern Station annex to the Union Observatory in Johannesburg, South Africa. The asteroid was named in honor of the city of Leiden in the Netherlands.

== Orbit and classification ==
Lugduna is a member of the Flora family (402), a giant asteroid family and the largest family of stony asteroids in the main-belt. It orbits the Sun in the inner main-belt at a distance of 1.8–2.6 AU once every 3 years and 3 months (1,180 days). Its orbit has an eccentricity of 0.19 and an inclination of 5° with respect to the ecliptic.

The asteroid was first identified as A908 BD at Taunton Observatory (803), Massachusetts, in January 1908. Its observation arc begins at Johannesburg, three weeks after its official discovery observation.

== Physical characteristics ==
Both the Tholen classification and PanSTARRS photometric survey characterize Lugduna as a stony S-type asteroid.

=== Rotation period ===
In December 2010, the best-rated rotational lightcurve of Lugduna was obtained from photometric observations by Gordon Gartrelle at the University of North Dakota and at the Badlands Observatory in South Dakota, United States. Analysis of the bimodal lightcurve gave a well-defined rotation period of 5.477 hours with a brightness variation of 0.43 magnitude (U=3). Other observations gave a period of 5 and 5.478 hours with an amplitude of 0.33 (U=2-/3-).

=== Diameter and albedo ===
According to the surveys carried out by the Japanese Akari satellite and the NEOWISE mission of NASA's Wide-field Infrared Survey Explorer, Lugduna measures between 8.275 and 10.47 kilometers in diameter and its surface has an albedo between 0.208 and 0.363.

The Collaborative Asteroid Lightcurve Link assumes an albedo of 0.24 – derived from 8 Flora, the Flora family's largest member and namesake – and calculates a diameter of 9.76 kilometers based on an absolute magnitude of 12.22.

== Naming ==
This minor planet was named in honor of the Dutch city of Leiden where the Leiden Observatory of Leiden University – parent of the discovering Leiden Southern Station – is located. The asteroid was named by the discoverer and by astronomer Gerrit Pels, who computed the body's orbit. The official naming citation was reviewed by Ingrid van Houten-Groeneveld who was a long-time astronomer at Leiden.

The Latin name Lugdunum Batavorum (or Batavorum Lugdunum) and Academia Lugduno Batava has been used by the city and by the university in official documents. The Latin name also refers to Brittenburg, an ancient Roman ruin located west of Leiden.
