= 1267 Geertruida =

Asteroid

Discovery
- Discovered by: H. van Gent
- Discovery site: Johannesburg Obs.
- Discovery date: 23 April 1930

Designations
- Named after: Geertruid Hamerslag Pels (Sister of astronomer Gerrit Pels)
- Alternative designations: 1930 HD · 1926 GV; 1927 SH · 1930 LA; 1954 TM_{1} · 1965 HB; 1965 JE
- Minor planet category: main-belt · (inner) background

Orbital characteristics
- Epoch 4 September 2017 (JD 2458000.5)
- Uncertainty parameter 0
- Observation arc: 91.55 yr (33,440 days)
- Aphelion: 2.9116 AU
- Perihelion: 2.0260 AU
- Semi-major axis: 2.4688 AU
- Eccentricity: 0.1794
- Orbital period (sidereal): 3.88 yr (1,417 days)
- Mean anomaly: 136.63°
- Mean motion: 0° 15^{m} 14.76^{s} / day
- Inclination: 4.7825°
- Longitude of ascending node: 24.390°
- Argument of perihelion: 268.19°

Physical characteristics
- Dimensions: 15.621±4.700 km 16.92±5.04 km 17.16±0.30 km 18.91±0.25 km 20.92±0.60 km 23.108±0.154 km 23.41±1.4 km 23.43 km (derived); 23.572±0.153 km
- Synodic rotation period: 5.50 h 5.5087±0.0007 h
- Geometric albedo: 0.030±0.002; 0.0466±0.006; 0.0479±0.0062; 0.0510 (derived); 0.060±0.004; 0.06±0.01; 0.0706±0.0488; 0.09±0.07; 0.095±0.014
- Spectral type: C (assumed)
- Absolute magnitude (H): 12.00 · 12.10 · 12.17

1267 Geertruida, provisional designation 1930 HD, is a carbonaceous background asteroid from the inner regions of the asteroid belt, approximately 20 kilometers in diameter. Discovered by astronomer Hendrik van Gent at Johannesburg Observatory in 1930, the asteroid was later named after Geertruid Pels, sister of Dutch astronomer Gerrit Pels.

== Discovery ==
Geertruida was discovered on 23 April 1930, by Dutch astronomer Hendrik van Gent at the Union Observatory in Johannesburg, South Africa. Five nights later, it was independently discovered by German astronomer Karl Reinmuth at Heidelberg Observatory on 28 April 1930. The Minor Planet Center only recognizes the first discoverer. The asteroid was previously identified as 1926 GV at Heidelberg Observatory in April 1926.

== Orbit and classification ==
Geertruida is a non-family asteroid from the main belt's background population. It orbits the Sun in the inner asteroid belt at a distance of 2.0–2.9 AU once every 3 years and 11 months (1,417 days; semi-major axis of 2.47 AU). Its orbit has an eccentricity of 0.18 and an inclination of 5° with respect to the ecliptic. The body's observation arc begins with its official discovery observation at Johannesburg in April 1930.

== Physical characteristics ==
Geertruida is an assumed carbonaceous C-type asteroid, which agrees with its measured albedo (see below).

=== Rotation period ===
In 1977, a rotational lightcurve of Geertruida was obtained from photometric observations by Swedish astronomer Claes-Ingvar Lagerkvist at the Uppsala Southern Station in Australia. Lightcurve analysis gave a rotation period of 5.50 hours with a brightness amplitude of 0.5 magnitude (U=2). In October 2016, a refined period of 5.5087 hours with an amplitude of 0.35 magnitude (U=3) was obtained at the Oakley Southern Sky Observatory (E09).

=== Diameter and albedo ===
According to the surveys carried out by the Infrared Astronomical Satellite IRAS, the Japanese Akari satellite and the NEOWISE mission of NASA's Wide-field Infrared Survey Explorer, Geertruida measures between 15.621 and 23.572 kilometers in diameter and its surface has an albedo between 0.030 and 0.095.

The Collaborative Asteroid Lightcurve Link derives an albedo of 0.0510, typical for that of a carbonaceous asteroid, and a diameter of 23.43 kilometers based on an absolute magnitude of 12.0.

== Naming ==
This minor planet was named by Dutch astronomer Gerrit Pels after his sister Geertruid (or Geertruida) Hamerslag Pels. Gerrit Pels, who was an assistant astronomer at Leiden Observatory, computed the body's orbit. The minor planet 1667 Pels was named in his honor. The author of the Dictionary of Minor Planet Names, Lutz Schmadel learned about the meaning of this asteroid from Ingrid van Houten-Groeneveld, who was a long-time astronomer at Leiden Observatory.
