= Union Observatory =

Defunct observatory in Johannesburg, South Africa

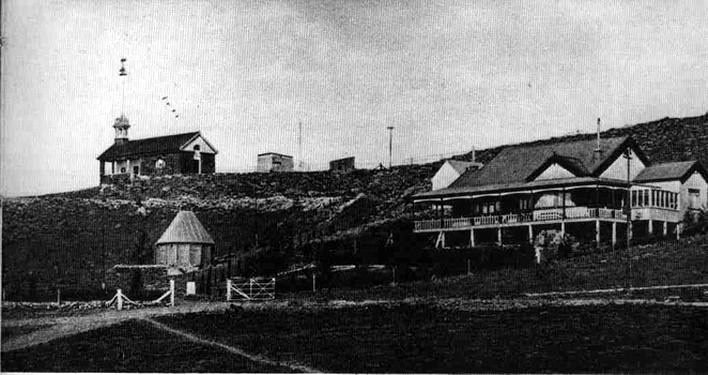
- Alternative names: Johannesburg Observatory
- Observatory code: 078
- Location: Observatory, Johannesburg, South Africa
- Coordinates: 26°11′3″S 28°04′27″E
- Altitude: 1,808 metres (5,932 ft)
- Established: 1903; 123 years ago
- Closed: 1971
- Website: assa.saao.ac.za/sections/history/observatories/rep_obs/

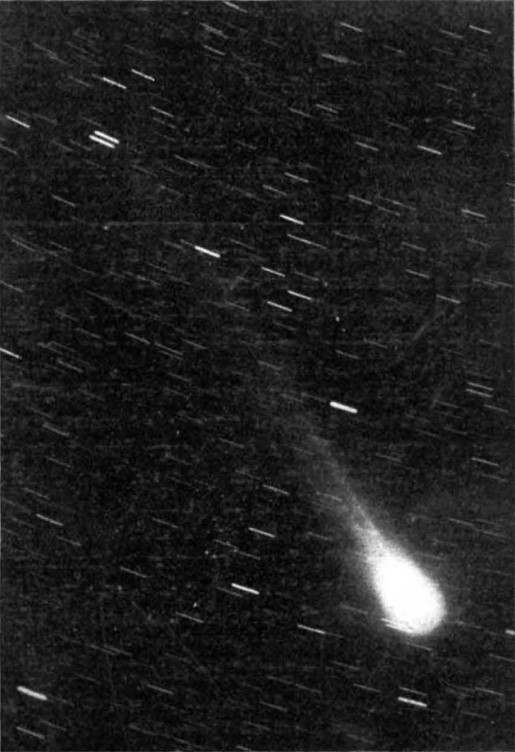
Photo of comet Mellish obtained with the Franklin Adams star camera of the Union Observatory on June 6, 1915, with an exposure of ninety minutes. The position of the comet was then R.A. 22h. 35m., declination 70° 18′ south.

Union Observatory, also known as Transvaal Observatory, Republic Observatory and Johannesburg Observatory (078), is a defunct astronomical observatory in Johannesburg, South Africa that operated from 1903 to 1971. It is located on Observatory Ridge, the city's highest point at 1,808 metres altitude in the suburb Observatory.

The observatory and its former annex, the § Leiden Southern Station, are known for the discovery of 6,000 double stars and for Proxima Centauri, made by astronomer Robert Innes. At the observatory, 578 identifications of minor planets were made, a record number at the time. The Minor Planet Center credits the observatory as the site where 147 minor planets were discovered by astronomers Harry Wood, Cyril Jackson, Hendrik van Gent, Ernest Johnson, Ejnar Hertzsprung, Jacobus Bruwer and Joseph Churms (see § List of discovered minor planets).

== History ==
The origins of the observatory began when Theodore Reunert of the South African Association for the Advancement of Science petitioned Alfred Milner Governor of the Transvaal Colony on 29 October 1902 for the establishment of a meteorological and astronomical observatory in Johannesburg. Assistant Colonial Secretary W.H. Moor agreed to the project on 17 December 1902 with the budget increased from £1,350 to £5,629 due to equipment changes.

On 1 April 1903, a new Meteorological Department was temporarily established in Johannesburg. A location was sought for the new observatory and the Johannesburg Town Council made a decision on 12 May 1903, located within the municipal boundaries. The land of eight acres, on a ridge west of the Indian War Memorial, was on the northern boundary of the farm Doornfontein, presently part of the suburb Observatory and was given as a gift by the Bezuidenhout family, with a further two acres sold for £500. The land was given only for the use of science and a road, later called Observatory Avenue, was also to be built close to the site. The observatory building was built and the formal opening took place on 17 January 1905 by Governor Milner, but had no astronomical equipment.

In 1906 it was lent a Hamberg universal instrument (2 5/8-inch object glass) by Dr Oskar Backlund. In September 1907 a 9-inch Grubb refractor was now used but repolished in 1908. Mr J. Franklin-Adams gifted the observatory a 10-inch triple O.G. Cooke Star-Camera in 1909. J.B. Rissik, Minister for Lands, permitted the purchase of a 26-inch refracting telescope from the Grubb Telescope Company in 1909.

With the formation of the Union of South Africa in 1910, South Africa's two colonial observatories came under the control of the Minister of the Interior. With the removal of the meteorological functions, the observatory was renamed Observatory of the Union of South Africa (Union Observatory) on 1 April 1912. It became the Republic Observatory in 1961.

Well remembered for the quality of its Directors, work done on minor planets and the discovery of Proxima Centauri, growing light pollution problems in Johannesburg led to its closure in 1971–1972. The Observatory's buildings at 18a Gill Street, Observatory, Johannesburg, still exist.

At that time the South African government decided to amalgamate all astronomical research into one body, which later became known as the South African Astronomical Observatory (SAAO); it has its headquarters in Cape Town and has Sutherland as its outstation. The main Cape telescopes were moved to Sutherland, and the Radcliffe Observatory at Pretoria was also dismantled.

The main-belt asteroid 1585 Union, discovered by Ernest Johnson in 1947, was named for the Union observatory.

=== Name changes ===
Union Observatory went through a number of name changes:

- 1903–1909: Transvaal Meteorological Department
- 1909–1912: Transvaal Observatory
- 1912–1961: Union Observatory
- 1961–1971: Republic Observatory

=== Directors ===
Its directors were:

- 1903–1927: Robert Innes
- 1927–1941: Harry Edwin Wood
- 1941–1956: Willem Hendrik van den Bos
- 1957–1965: William Stephen Finsen
- 1965–1971: Jan Hers (1915–2010)

== Leiden Southern Station ==
The Leiden Southern Station (081) was a collaboration between the Dutch Leiden Observatory and Union Observatory. From 1938 to 1954 it was an annex to the Union Observatory, and was moved to Hartbeespoort in 1954 due to light pollution. It operated until 1978.

== Discoveries ==
=== List of discovered minor planets ===
The Minor Planet Center credits Union Observatory ("Johannesburg"), as the site of 147 minor planet discoveries, made by the following list of astronomers:

- ^{A} Harry Edwin Wood
- ^{B} Cyril Jackson
- ^{C} Hendrik van Gent
- ^{D} Ernest Leonard Johnson
- ^{E} Ejnar Hertzsprung
- ^{F} Jacobus Albertus Bruwer
- ^{G} Joseph Churms

important; height: 675px;
715 Transvaalia	22 April 1911	list^{[A]}
758 Mancunia	18 May 1912	list^{[A]}
790 Pretoria	16 January 1912	list^{[A]}
982 Franklina	21 May 1922	list^{[A]}
1032 Pafuri	30 May 1924	list^{[A]}
1096 Reunerta	21 July 1928	list^{[A]}
1116 Catriona	5 April 1929	list^{[B]}
1132 Hollandia	13 September 1929	list^{[C]}
1133 Lugduna	13 September 1929	list^{[C]}
1165 Imprinetta	24 April 1930	list^{[C]}
1186 Turnera	1 August 1929	list^{[B]}
1193 Africa	24 April 1931	list^{[B]}
1194 Aletta	13 May 1931	list^{[B]}
1195 Orangia	24 May 1931	list^{[B]}
1196 Sheba	21 May 1931	list^{[B]}
1197 Rhodesia	9 June 1931	list^{[B]}
1225 Ariane	23 April 1930	list^{[C]}
1226 Golia	22 April 1930	list^{[C]}
1241 Dysona	4 March 1932	list^{[A]}
1242 Zambesia	28 April 1932	list^{[B]}
1243 Pamela	7 May 1932	list^{[B]}
1244 Deira	25 May 1932	list^{[B]}
1245 Calvinia	26 May 1932	list^{[B]}
1246 Chaka	23 July 1932	list^{[B]}
1248 Jugurtha	1 September 1932	list^{[B]}

important; height: 675px;
1264 Letaba	21 April 1933	list^{[B]}
1267 Geertruida	23 April 1930	list^{[C]}
1268 Libya	29 April 1930	list^{[B]}
1278 Kenya	15 June 1933	list^{[B]}
1279 Uganda	15 June 1933	list^{[B]}
1282 Utopia	17 August 1933	list^{[B]}
1305 Pongola	19 July 1928	list^{[A]}
1318 Nerina	24 March 1934	list^{[B]}
1319 Disa	19 March 1934	list^{[B]}
1320 Impala	13 May 1934	list^{[B]}
1321 Majuba	7 May 1934	list^{[B]}
1323 Tugela	19 May 1934	list^{[B]}
1324 Knysna	15 June 1934	list^{[B]}
1325 Inanda	14 July 1934	list^{[B]}
1326 Losaka	14 July 1934	list^{[B]}
1327 Namaqua	7 September 1934	list^{[B]}
1336 Zeelandia	9 September 1934	list^{[C]}
1337 Gerarda	9 September 1934	list^{[C]}
1342 Brabantia	13 February 1935	list^{[C]}
1349 Bechuana	13 June 1934	list^{[B]}
1353 Maartje	13 February 1935	list^{[C]}
1354 Botha	3 April 1935	list^{[B]}
1355 Magoeba	30 April 1935	list^{[B]}
1356 Nyanza	3 May 1935	list^{[B]}
1357 Khama	2 July 1935	list^{[B]}

important; height: 675px;
1358 Gaika	21 July 1935	list^{[B]}
1359 Prieska	22 July 1935	list^{[B]}
1360 Tarka	22 July 1935	list^{[B]}
1362 Griqua	31 July 1935	list^{[B]}
1367 Nongoma	3 July 1934	list^{[B]}
1368 Numidia	30 April 1935	list^{[B]}
1383 Limburgia	9 September 1934	list^{[C]}
1384 Kniertje	9 September 1934	list^{[C]}
1385 Gelria	24 May 1935	list^{[C]}
1389 Onnie	28 September 1935	list^{[C]}
1393 Sofala	25 May 1936	list^{[B]}
1394 Algoa	12 June 1936	list^{[B]}
1396 Outeniqua	9 August 1936	list^{[B]}
1397 Umtata	9 August 1936	list^{[B]}
1427 Ruvuma	16 May 1937	list^{[B]}
1428 Mombasa	5 July 1937	list^{[B]}
1429 Pemba	2 July 1937	list^{[B]}
1430 Somalia	5 July 1937	list^{[B]}
1431 Luanda	29 July 1937	list^{[B]}
1432 Ethiopia	1 August 1937	list^{[B]}
1456 Saldanha	2 July 1937	list^{[B]}
1467 Mashona	30 July 1938	list^{[B]}
1468 Zomba	23 July 1938	list^{[B]}
1474 Beira	20 August 1935	list^{[B]}
1490 Limpopo	14 June 1936	list^{[B]}

important; height: 675px;
1505 Koranna	21 April 1939	list^{[B]}
1506 Xosa	15 May 1939	list^{[B]}
1568 Aisleen	21 August 1946	list^{[D]}
1580 Betulia	22 May 1950	list^{[D]}
1585 Union	7 September 1947	list^{[D]}
1595 Tanga	19 June 1930	list^{[B]}^{[A]}
1607 Mavis	3 September 1950	list^{[D]}
1609 Brenda	10 July 1951	list^{[D]}
1618 Dawn	5 July 1948	list^{[D]}
1623 Vivian	9 August 1948	list^{[D]}
1627 Ivar	25 September 1929	list^{[E]}
1634 Ndola	19 August 1935	list^{[B]}
1638 Ruanda	3 May 1935	list^{[B]}
1641 Tana	25 July 1935	list^{[B]}
1658 Innes	13 July 1953	list^{[F]}
1660 Wood	7 April 1953	list^{[F]}
1663 van den Bos	4 August 1926	list^{[A]}
1666 van Gent	22 July 1930	list^{[C]}
1667 Pels	16 September 1930	list^{[C]}
1670 Minnaert	9 September 1934	list^{[C]}
1676 Kariba	15 June 1939	list^{[B]}
1686 De Sitter	28 September 1935	list^{[C]}
1689 Floris-Jan	16 September 1930	list^{[C]}
1693 Hertzsprung	5 May 1935	list^{[C]}
1694 Kaiser	29 September 1934	list^{[C]}

important; height: 675px;
1701 Okavango	6 July 1953	list^{[G]}
1702 Kalahari	7 July 1924	list^{[E]}
1712 Angola	28 May 1935	list^{[B]}
1731 Smuts	9 August 1948	list^{[D]}
1738 Oosterhoff	16 September 1930	list^{[C]}
1752 van Herk	22 July 1930	list^{[C]}
1753 Mieke	10 May 1934	list^{[C]}
1760 Sandra	10 April 1950	list^{[D]}
1784 Benguella	30 June 1935	list^{[B]}
1816 Liberia	29 January 1936	list^{[B]}
1817 Katanga	20 June 1939	list^{[B]}
1819 Laputa	9 August 1948	list^{[D]}
1879 Broederstroom	16 October 1935	list^{[C]}
1885 Herero	9 August 1948	list^{[D]}
1914 Hartbeespoortdam	28 September 1930	list^{[C]}
1922 Zulu	25 April 1949	list^{[D]}
1925 Franklin-Adams	9 September 1934	list^{[C]}
1945 Wesselink	22 July 1930	list^{[C]}
1946 Walraven	8 August 1931	list^{[C]}
1948 Kampala	3 April 1935	list^{[B]}
1949 Messina	8 July 1936	list^{[B]}
1986 Plaut	28 September 1935	list^{[C]}
2019 van Albada	28 September 1935	list^{[C]}
2025 Nortia	6 June 1953	list^{[G]}
2066 Palala	4 June 1934	list^{[B]}

important; height: 595px;
2193 Jackson	18 May 1926	list^{[A]}
2203 van Rhijn	28 September 1935	list^{[C]}
2378 Pannekoek	13 February 1935	list^{[C]}
2546 Libitina	23 March 1950	list^{[D]}
2651 Karen	28 August 1949	list^{[D]}
2718 Handley	30 July 1951	list^{[D]}
2801 Huygens	28 September 1935	list^{[C]}
2825 Crosby	19 September 1938	list^{[B]}
2829 Bobhope	9 August 1948	list^{[D]}
2831 Stevin	17 September 1930	list^{[C]}
2865 Laurel	31 July 1935	list^{[B]}
2945 Zanstra	28 September 1935	list^{[C]}
3184 Raab	22 August 1949	list^{[D]}
3284 Niebuhr	13 July 1953	list^{[F]}
3300 McGlasson	10 July 1928	list^{[A]}
3768 Monroe	5 September 1937	list^{[B]}
4296 van Woerkom	28 September 1935	list^{[C]}
4359 Berlage	28 September 1935	list^{[C]}
4511 Rembrandt	28 September 1935	list^{[C]}
5038 Overbeek	31 May 1948	list^{[D]}
(5452) 1937 NN	5 July 1937	list^{[B]}
7102 Neilbone	12 July 1936	list^{[B]}
