= 1165 Imprinetta =

Carbonaceous Meliboean asteroid

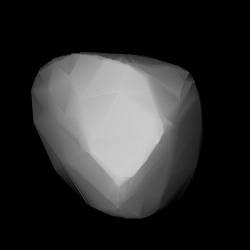
- Shape model of Imprinetta from its lightcurve

Discovery
- Discovered by: H. van Gent
- Discovery site: Johannesburg Obs. (Leiden Southern Station)
- Discovery date: 24 April 1930

Designations
- Pronunciation: /ˌɪmprɪˈnɛtə/
- Named after: Imprinetta Gent (wife of the discoverer)
- Alternative designations: 1930 HM · A909 TA
- Minor planet category: main-belt · (outer); Meliboea

Orbital characteristics
- Epoch 4 September 2017 (JD 2458000.5)
- Uncertainty parameter 0
- Observation arc: 107.47 yr (39,253 days)
- Aphelion: 3.7891 AU
- Perihelion: 2.4589 AU
- Semi-major axis: 3.1240 AU
- Eccentricity: 0.2129
- Orbital period (sidereal): 5.52 yr (2,017 days)
- Mean anomaly: 221.92°
- Mean motion: 0° 10^{m} 42.6^{s} / day
- Inclination: 12.812°
- Longitude of ascending node: 203.79°
- Argument of perihelion: 96.959°

Physical characteristics
- Dimensions: 47.14±15.99 km 48.65 km (derived); 48.82±1.9 km 50.30±14.80 km 53.187±0.325 km 53.40±1.62 km 56.44±0.87 km 59.378±0.290 km
- Synodic rotation period: 7.9374±0.0016 h 8.107±0.010 h
- Geometric albedo: 0.029±0.005; 0.0380±0.0055; 0.0392 (derived); 0.04±0.02; 0.04±0.03; 0.047±0.003; 0.048±0.002; 0.0562±0.005
- Spectral type: C
- Absolute magnitude (H): 10.30 · 10.69±0.38 · 10.70

1165 Imprinetta, provisional designation 1930 HM, is a carbonaceous Meliboean asteroid from the outer regions of the asteroid belt, approximately 49 kilometers (30 mi) in diameter. It was discovered on 24 April 1930 by Dutch astronomer Hendrik van Gent at the Union Observatory in Johannesburg, South Africa. The asteroid was named after Imprinetta Gent, wife of the discoverer.

== Orbit and classification ==
Imprinetta is a member of the Meliboea family, a smaller asteroid family of carbonaceous outer-belt asteroids with a few hundred members, named after 137 Meliboea.

This asteroid orbits the Sun in the outer main-belt at a distance of 2.5–3.8 AU once every 5 years and 6 months (2,017 days). Its orbit has an eccentricity of 0.21 and an inclination of 13° with respect to the ecliptic.

The body's observation arc begins with its first identification as A909 TA at Heidelberg Observatory in October 1909, more than 20 years prior to its official discovery observation at Johannesburg.

== Physical characteristics ==
Imprinetta has been characterized as a carbonaceous C-type asteroid by PanSTARRS photometric survey, which corresponds with the overall spectral type of the Meliboea family.

=== Rotation period ===
In October 2003, a rotational lightcurve of Imprinetta was obtained from photometric observations by American John Menke at his observatory in Barnesville, Maryland. Lightcurve analysis gave a well-defined rotation period of 8.107 hours with a brightness variation of 0.20 magnitude (U=3). An alternative observation gave a lightcurve with period of 7.9374 hours and an amplitude of 0.20 magnitude (U=2).

=== Diameter and albedo ===
According to the surveys carried out by the Infrared Astronomical Satellite IRAS, the Japanese Akari satellite and the NEOWISE mission of NASA's Wide-field Infrared Survey Explorer, Imprinetta measures between 47.14 and 59.378 kilometers (29.291 and 36.896 mi) in diameter and its surface has an albedo between 0.029 and 0.0562.

The Collaborative Asteroid Lightcurve Link derives an albedo of 0.0392 and a diameter of 48.65 kilometers (30.23 mi) based on an absolute magnitude of 10.7.

== Naming ==
This minor planet was named after Imprinetta Gent, wife of the discoverer. The naming was proposed by the discoverer and by Gerrit Pels, who computed its orbit. The official naming citation was mentioned in The Names of the Minor Planets by Paul Herget in 1955 (H 108).
