= 1226 Golia =

Asteroid

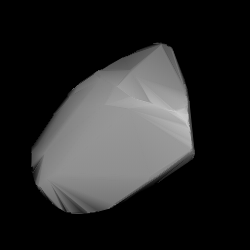
- Shape model of Golia from its lightcurve

Discovery
- Discovered by: H. van Gent
- Discovery site: Johannesburg Obs. (Leiden Southern Station)
- Discovery date: 22 April 1930

Designations
- Named after: Jacobus Golius (Dutch mathematician)
- Alternative designations: 1930 HL · 1957 WN
- Minor planet category: main-belt · (middle)

Orbital characteristics
- Epoch 4 September 2017 (JD 2458000.5)
- Uncertainty parameter 0
- Observation arc: 87.20 yr (31,851 days)
- Aphelion: 2.8736 AU
- Perihelion: 2.2927 AU
- Semi-major axis: 2.5832 AU
- Eccentricity: 0.1124
- Orbital period (sidereal): 4.15 yr (1,516 days)
- Mean anomaly: 57.385°
- Mean motion: 0° 14^{m} 14.64^{s} / day
- Inclination: 9.8470°
- Longitude of ascending node: 17.486°
- Argument of perihelion: 139.78°

Physical characteristics
- Dimensions: 11.679±0.158 km 12.179±0.147 km 15.92 km (derived); 16.39±1.5 km
- Synodic rotation period: 4.0910±0.0005 h 4.097 h
- Geometric albedo: 0.1008 (derived); 0.1724±0.0240; 0.187±0.023; 0.2388±0.052
- Spectral type: M · S
- Absolute magnitude (H): 11.10 · 11.809±0.003 (R) · 12.1 · 12.2 · 12.39±0.61

1226 Golia, provisional designation 1930 HL, is a metallic asteroid from the central region of the asteroid belt, approximately 15 kilometers in diameter. It was discovered on 22 April 1930, by Dutch astronomer Hendrik van Gent at Leiden Southern Station, annex to the Johannesburg Observatory in South Africa. It is named for Jacobus Golius.

== Orbit and classification ==
Golia orbits the Sun in the central main-belt at a distance of 2.3–2.9 AU once every 4 years and 2 months (1,516 days). Its orbit has an eccentricity of 0.11 and an inclination of 10° with respect to the ecliptic. The body's observation arc begins at Johannesburg one night after its official discovery observation, with no precoveries taken and no prior identifications made.

== Physical characteristics ==
Golia has been characterized as a metallic M-type asteroid by the Wide-field Infrared Survey Explorer (WISE).

=== Rotation period ===
In March 1992, the first reliable rotational light curve of Golia was obtained by Italian astronomer Mario Di Martino using the ESO 1-metre telescope at La Silla in northern Chile. Analysis gave a well-defined rotation period of 4.097 hours with a change in brightness of 0.35 magnitude (U=3). Another light curve was obtained from photometric observations in the R-band at the Palomar Transient Factory in October 2011, giving a period of 4.0910 hours and an amplitude of 0.24 magnitude (U=2).

=== Diameter and albedo ===
According to preliminary results by the NEOWISE mission of NASA's WISE space telescope, Golia measures 11.68 and 12.18 kilometers in diameter, and its surface has an albedo of 0.187 and 0.172, respectively, while the Infrared Astronomical Satellite IRAS gives a diameter of 16.39 kilometers and an albedo of 0.239. The Collaborative Asteroid Lightcurve Link considers Golia to be of stony composition, deriving an albedo of 0.1008 and a diameter of 15.92 kilometers, using an absolute magnitude of 12.1.

== Naming ==
This minor planet was named after Dutch professor of astronomy Jakob Gool (1596–1667), also known as Jacobus Golius, who founded the Leiden Observatory in 1633. He was a mathematician and orientalist, who translated Arabic texts into Latin including the work of 9th-century Muslim astronomer Al-Farghani. He was also a teacher of French philosopher René Descartes, after whom the minor planet 3587 Descartes is named. The official naming citation was compiled by Lutz Schmadel for the Dictionary of Minor Planet Names based on a private communication with Ingrid van Houten-Groeneveld at Leiden.
