= 1694 Kaiser =

Asteroid in the asteroid belt

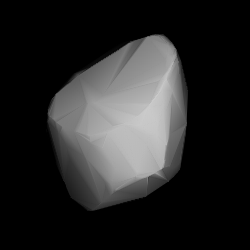
- Shape model of Kaiser from its lightcurve

Discovery
- Discovered by: H. van Gent
- Discovery site: Johannesburg Obs. (Leiden Southern Station)
- Discovery date: 29 September 1934

Designations
- Named after: Frederik Kaiser (astronomer)
- Alternative designations: 1934 SB · 1960 SD
- Minor planet category: main-belt · (inner)

Orbital characteristics
- Epoch 4 September 2017 (JD 2458000.5)
- Uncertainty parameter 0
- Observation arc: 82.60 yr (30,168 days)
- Aphelion: 3.0137 AU
- Perihelion: 1.7759 AU
- Semi-major axis: 2.3948 AU
- Eccentricity: 0.2584
- Orbital period (sidereal): 3.71 yr (1,354 days)
- Mean anomaly: 125.25°
- Mean motion: 0° 15^{m} 57.24^{s} / day
- Inclination: 11.103°
- Longitude of ascending node: 13.421°
- Argument of perihelion: 356.15°

Physical characteristics
- Dimensions: 13.84±1.27 km 15.678±0.175 km 28.42 km (calculated)
- Synodic rotation period: 9 h (Note: CALL (2011web) gives a rotation period of 9 hours. Summary figures at the Lightcurve Database (select number "1694").); 13.02±0.01 h 13.23±0.02 h
- Geometric albedo: 0.057 (assumed); 0.1659±0.0088; 0.166±0.009; 0.241±0.046
- Spectral type: B–V = 0.735; U–B = 0.415; Tholen = GC · C
- Absolute magnitude (H): 11.46

1694 Kaiser (prov. designation: 1934 SB) is a carbonaceous background asteroid from the inner regions of the asteroid belt, approximately 16 kilometers in diameter. It was discovered on 29 September 1934, by Dutch astronomer Hendrik van Gent at Leiden Southern Station, annex to the Johannesburg Observatory in South Africa. It is named for Dutch astronomer Frederik Kaiser.

== Orbit and classification ==
Kaiser is a non-family asteroid of the main belt's background population when applying the hierarchical clustering method to its proper orbital elements. It orbits the Sun in the inner main-belt at a distance of 1.8–3.0 AU once every 3 years and 9 months (1,354 days). Its orbit has an eccentricity of 0.26 and an inclination of 11° with respect to the ecliptic.of 1.8–3.0 AU once every 3.71 years (1,354 days). Its eccentric orbit of 0.26 is inclined by 11 degrees towards the plane of the ecliptic. Kaiser's observation arc begins with its official discovery observation, as no precoveries were taken, and no prior identifications were made.

== Naming ==
This asteroid was named in honor of Dutch astronomer Frederik Kaiser (1808–1872), the director of the Leiden Observatory from 1837 to 1872. He founded the new Leiden Observatory and stimulated Dutch astronomical research. Frederick Kaiser is also honored by the lunar and Martian craters Kaiser. Originally, the asteroid was erroneously named Kapteyn (MPC 2822), and only later it was noticed that the Duch astronomer Jacobus Kapteyn was already honored by the minor planet 818 Kapteynia. The official naming citation was published by the Minor Planet Center on 15 July 1968 (M.P.C. 2883).

== Physical parameters ==
=== Spectral type ===
On the Tholen taxonomy, the carbonaceous C-type asteroid is classified as a rare GC-type, an intermediate to the G-type asteroids.

=== Diameter and albedo ===
According to the survey the Japanese Akari satellite, and NASA's Wide-field Infrared Survey Explorer with its subsequent NEOWISE mission, Kaiser measures 13.84 and 15.68 kilometers in diameter, and its surface has an albedo of 0.241 and 0.166, respectively. The Collaborative Asteroid Lightcurve Link assumes a standard albedo for carbonaceous asteroids of 0.057 and calculates a diameter of 28.42 kilometers, with an absolute magnitude of 11.46

=== Rotation period ===
Two rotational lightcurves for Kaiser were obtained from photometric observations by American astronomer Brian D. Warner at his Palmer Divide Observatory in Colorado (see video in § External links). The lightcurves from January 2006 and November 2012, gave a rotation period of 13.02 and 13.23 hours and a variation in brightness of 0.32 and 0.13 magnitude, respectively (U=3/2+).
