= 1389 Onnie =

Asteroid

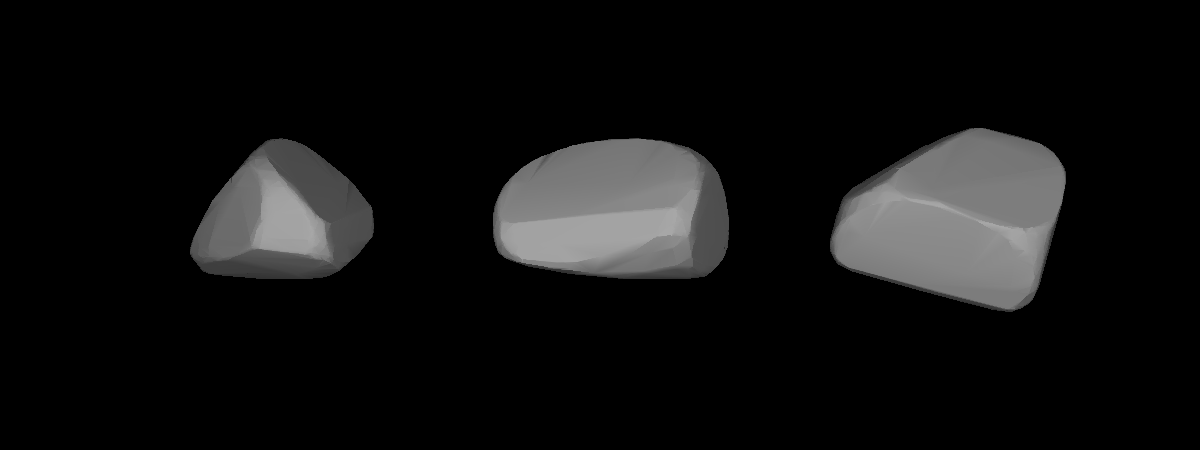
- Light-curve-based 3D-model of Onnie

Discovery
- Discovered by: H. van Gent
- Discovery site: Johannesburg Obs. (Leiden Southern Station)
- Discovery date: 28 September 1935

Designations
- Named after: A. Kruyt (relative of G. Pels)
- Alternative designations: 1935 SS_{1} · 1949 QV_{1} 1955 XB_{1}
- Minor planet category: main-belt · Koronis

Orbital characteristics
- Epoch 16 February 2017 (JD 2457800.5)
- Uncertainty parameter 0
- Observation arc: 80.87 yr (29,539 days)
- Aphelion: 2.9118 AU
- Perihelion: 2.8183 AU
- Semi-major axis: 2.8650 AU
- Eccentricity: 0.0163
- Orbital period (sidereal): 4.85 yr (1,771 days)
- Mean anomaly: 183.28°
- Mean motion: 0° 12^{m} 11.52^{s} / day
- Inclination: 2.0480°
- Longitude of ascending node: 174.57°
- Argument of perihelion: 297.53°

Physical characteristics
- Dimensions: 12.46 km (derived); 13.772±0.184 km 14.737±0.159 km
- Synodic rotation period: 22.5 h 23.0447±0.0005 h
- Geometric albedo: 0.1734±0.0387; 0.198±0.016; 0.24 (assumed)
- Spectral type: B–V = 0.810; LS · S
- Absolute magnitude (H): 11.64 · 11.69 · 11.74±0.40

1389 Onnie, provisional designation 1935 SS_{1}, is a stony Koronian asteroid from the outer region of the asteroid belt, approximately 13 kilometers in diameter. It was discovered on 28 September 1935, by Dutch astronomer Hendrik van Gent at Leiden Southern Station, annex to the Johannesburg Observatory in South Africa.

== Orbit and classification ==
The stony S-type asteroid belongs to the Koronis family, a group consisting of few hundred known bodies with nearly ecliptical orbits. Onnie orbits the Sun at a distance of 2.8–2.9 AU once every 4 years and 10 months (1,771 days). Its orbit has an eccentricity of 0.02 and an inclination of 2° with respect to the ecliptic. As no precoveries were taken, and no prior identifications were made, the body's observation arc begins with its official discovery observation at Johannesburg.

== Lightcurve ==
American astronomer Richard P. Binzel obtained a rotational light-curve of Onnie from photometric observations in September 1983. It gave a longer-than average rotation period of 22.5 hours with a change in brightness of 0.34 magnitude (U=2). In 2011 and 2013, respectively, a modeled light-curve using data from the Uppsala Asteroid Photometric Catalogue and other sources gave a period 23.0447 hours, as well as a spin axis of (183.0°, -75.0°) in ecliptic coordinates (U=n.a.).

== Diameter and albedo ==
According to the 2014-published result by NASA's Wide-field Infrared Survey Explorer with its subsequent NEOWISE mission, Onnie measures 13.77 kilometers in diameter, and its surface has an albedo of 0.198. The Collaborative Asteroid Lightcurve Link assumes a standard albedo for stony Koronian asteroids of 0.24 and derives a diameter of 12.46 kilometers based on an absolute magnitude of 11.69.

== Naming ==
This minor planet was named for A. Kruyt, sister-in-law of astronomer G. Pels (1893–1966). Pels, who proposed the minor planet's name, was as a lifelong member of the Leiden Observatory's staff, observer of minor planets at Leiden, as well as an orbit computer for many of Hendrik van Gent's made discoveries. The minor planet 1667 Pels was named in his honour.
