= 1693 Hertzsprung =

Main-belt asteroid

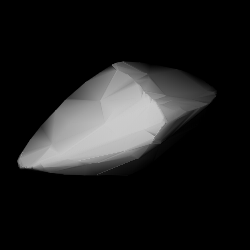
- Shape model of Hertzsprung from its lightcurve

Discovery
- Discovered by: H. van Gent
- Discovery site: Johannesburg Obs. (Leiden Southern Station)
- Discovery date: 5 May 1935

Designations
- Named after: Ejnar Hertzsprung (chemist, astronomer)
- Alternative designations: 1935 LA · 1930 HG; 1944 HA · 1950 VM
- Minor planet category: main-belt · (central)

Orbital characteristics
- Epoch 4 September 2017 (JD 2458000.5)
- Uncertainty parameter 0
- Observation arc: 81.90 yr (29,914 days)
- Aphelion: 3.5603 AU
- Perihelion: 2.0306 AU
- Semi-major axis: 2.7955 AU
- Eccentricity: 0.2736
- Orbital period (sidereal): 4.67 yr (1,707 days)
- Mean anomaly: 164.16°
- Mean motion: 0° 12^{m} 39.24^{s} / day
- Inclination: 11.942°
- Longitude of ascending node: 69.989°
- Argument of perihelion: 234.93°

Physical characteristics
- Dimensions: 30.95±8.64; 35.27±0.47 km 37.772±0.320; 38.67±1.5 km (IRAS:5); 39±4 km 40.396±0.972 km 41.97±3.65
- Synodic rotation period: 8.825 h
- Geometric albedo: 0.03±0.01; 0.0330±0.0034; 0.0484±0.004 (IRAS:5); 0.05±0.01; 0.05±0.05; 0.051±0.011; 0.059±0.002
- Spectral type: Tholen = CBU; P · C B–V = 0.762; U–B = 0.358
- Absolute magnitude (H): 10.97 · 11.39±0.82

1693 Hertzsprung (prov. designation: 1935 LA) is a dark and elongated background asteroid from the middle region of the asteroid belt, approximately 39 kilometers in diameter. It was discovered on 5 May 1935, by Dutch astronomer Hendrik van Gent at the Leiden Southern Station, annex to the Johannesburg Observatory in South Africa.

== Classification and orbit ==
Hertzsprung orbits the Sun in the central main-belt at a distance of 2.0–3.6 AU once every 4 years and 8 months (1,707 days). Its orbit has an eccentricity of 0.27 and an inclination of 12° with respect to the ecliptic. The asteroid was already observed as 1930 HG at Crimea-Simeis in 1930. This observation, however, remained unused and the body's observation arc begins with its official discovery observation at Johannesburg in 1935.

== Naming ==
This minor planet was named in memory of Danish chemist and astronomer Ejnar Hertzsprung (1873–1967), best known for the famous Hertzsprung–Russell diagram, a spectral classification system for stars he developed jointly with Russel, after whom the asteroid 1762 Russell was named. From 1934 to 1945, Hertzsprung was the head of the Leiden Observatory in the Netherlands.

As a prominent expert in photometry, he initiated a survey of variable stars in the Southern Milky Way at the Leiden Southern Station. A number of asteroids and comets were also discovered during the course of this survey. The asteroid's name was suggested by the staff at Leiden Observatory. The official naming citation was published by the Minor Planet Center on 15 December 1967 (M.P.C. 2822).

== Physical characteristics ==
=== Diameter and albedo ===
According to the space-based surveys carried out by the Infrared Astronomical Satellite IRAS, the Japanese Akari satellite, and NASA's Wide-field Infrared Survey Explorer with its subsequent NEOWISE mission, Hertzsprung measures between 30.95 and 41.97 kilometers in diameter and its surface has an albedo between 0.03 and 0.059.

The Collaborative Asteroid Lightcurve Link agrees with the results obtained by IRAS, that is an albedo of 0.048 and a diameter of 38.7 kilometers with an absolute magnitude of 10.97. While the dark C-type asteroid is classified as a rare CBU-subtype on the Tholen taxonomic scheme, the NEOWISE mission groups the body to the rare and reddish P-type asteroids.

=== Rotation and shape ===
In August 1987, a rotational lightcurve of Hertzsprung was obtained from photometric observations made with the ESO 1-metre telescope at La Silla Observatory in Chile. The lightcurve gave it a well-defined rotation period of 8.825 hours with a brightness amplitude of 0.45 magnitude (U=3). Observations by the NEOWISE mission found higher amplitudes of 0.70 and 1.05, which indicates that the body has a non-spheroidal or elongated shape.
