= 1132 Hollandia =

Asteroid

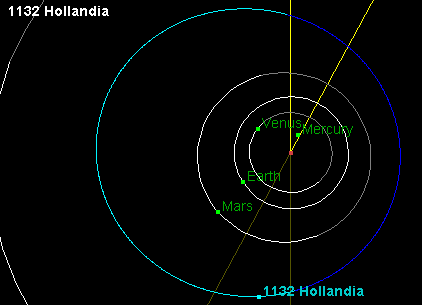
- 1132 Hollandia

Discovery
- Discovered by: H. van Gent
- Discovery site: Johannesburg Obs. (Leiden Southern Station)
- Discovery date: 13 September 1929

Designations
- Pronunciation: /hɒˈlændiə/
- Named after: Holland (part of The Netherlands)
- Alternative designations: 1929 RB_{1} · 1942 NC; 1946 JA · 1951 WA
- Minor planet category: main-belt · (middle)

Orbital characteristics
- Epoch 16 February 2017 (JD 2457800.5)
- Uncertainty parameter 0
- Observation arc: 86.74 yr (31,680 days)
- Aphelion: 3.4238 AU
- Perihelion: 1.9498 AU
- Semi-major axis: 2.6868 AU
- Eccentricity: 0.2743
- Orbital period (sidereal): 4.40 yr (1,609 days)
- Mean anomaly: 335.62°
- Mean motion: 0° 13^{m} 25.68^{s} / day
- Inclination: 7.2217°
- Longitude of ascending node: 29.624°
- Argument of perihelion: 270.51°

Physical characteristics
- Dimensions: 20.48±5.58 km 25.32 km (calculated); 27.235±0.116 km 27.36±0.66 km 27.59±0.78 km 27.727±0.313 km
- Synodic rotation period: 5.326±0.015 h 5.360±0.001 h 5.568±0.005 h
- Geometric albedo: 0.086±0.013; 0.10 (assumed); 0.12±0.06; 0.1328±0.0221; 0.135±0.008
- Spectral type: S
- Absolute magnitude (H): 10.60 · 11.1 · 11.12±0.50

1132 Hollandia, provisional designation 1929 RB_{1}, is a stony asteroid from the middle region of the asteroid belt, approximately 27 kilometers in diameter. It was discovered on 13 September 1929, by Dutch astronomer Hendrik van Gent at Union Observatory in Johannesburg, South Africa, while working for Leiden Observatory. It was named for the region Holland in the Netherlands.

== Classification and orbit ==
Hollandia is an assumed stony S-type asteroid. It orbits the Sun at a distance of 1.9–3.4 AU once every 4 years and 5 months (1,609 days). Its orbit has an eccentricity of 0.278 and an inclination of 7° with respect to the ecliptic. The body's observation arc begins with its official discovery observation as no precoveries were taken and no prior identifications were made.

== Physical characteristics ==
Between 2003 and 2014, three rotational lightcurves of Hollandia were obtained from photometric observations taken by French amateur astronomer René Roy, Jason Sauppe at Oakley Observatory and Maurice Clark at TTU's Preston Gott Observatory. Lightcurve analysis gave a rotation period between 5.360 and 5.568 hours with a brightness variation of 0.15–0.35 magnitude (U=2+/2+/2+).

According to the surveys carried out by the Japanese Akari satellite, and NASA's Wide-field Infrared Survey Explorer with its subsequent NEOWISE mission, Hollandia measures between 20.48 and 27.727 kilometers in diameter, and its surface has an albedo between 0.086 and 0.135. The Collaborative Asteroid Lightcurve Link assumes an albedo of 0.10 – a compromise value that lies in between the albedos for carbonaceous (0.057) and for stony (0.20) asteroids – and calculates a diameter of 25.32 kilometers using an absolute magnitude of 11.1.

== Naming ==
This asteroid was named after the Latin name for The Netherlands, a region in the European Union. Naming citation was first published by Paul Herget in The Names of the Minor Planets in 1955 (H 106).
