= 1353 Maartje =

Asteroid

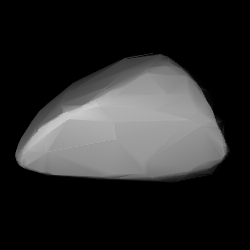
- Modelled shape of Maartje from its lightcurve

Discovery
- Discovered by: H. van Gent
- Discovery site: Johannesburg Obs.
- Discovery date: 13 February 1935

Designations
- Named after: Maartje Mekking (daughter of Dutch orbit computer B. G. Mekking)
- Alternative designations: 1935 CU · 1931 ME; 1953 TZ_{2} · A910 LB; A916 QB · A920 JC
- Minor planet category: main-belt · (outer); Eos

Orbital characteristics
- Epoch 4 September 2017 (JD 2458000.5)
- Uncertainty parameter 0
- Observation arc: 97.48 yr (35,606 days)
- Aphelion: 3.2988 AU
- Perihelion: 2.7210 AU
- Semi-major axis: 3.0099 AU
- Eccentricity: 0.0960
- Orbital period (sidereal): 5.22 yr (1,907 days)
- Mean anomaly: 134.16°
- Mean motion: 0° 11^{m} 19.32^{s} / day
- Inclination: 9.2032°
- Longitude of ascending node: 211.79°
- Argument of perihelion: 98.471°

Physical characteristics
- Dimensions: 33.75±3.9 km 34.16 km (derived); 37.16±10.25 km 38.13±0.79 km 39.013±0.534 km 39.55±0.68 km 42.175±0.390 km
- Synodic rotation period: 12 h 18 h 22.930±0.001 h (best); 22.98±0.05 h 22.9924±0.0002 h (Note: Unpublished study (Hanus 2016d). See summary figures for (1353) Maartje at the LCDB); 22.9926 h
- Geometric albedo: 0.0687±0.0045; 0.088±0.004; 0.1073±0.030; 0.13±0.06; 0.136±0.015; 0.1660 (derived)
- Spectral type: LS · S (assumed)
- Absolute magnitude (H): 9.80 · 9.9 · 10.0 · 10.01 · 10.01±0.09 · 10.40

1353 Maartje, provisional designation 1935 CU, is an Eoan asteroid from the outer regions of the asteroid belt, approximately 37 kilometers in diameter. It was discovered on 13 February 1935, by Dutch astronomer Hendrik van Gent at the Union Observatory in Johannesburg, South Africa. The asteroid was named after Maartje Mekking, daughter of a staff member at the Dutch Leiden Observatory.

== Orbit and classification ==
Maartje is a member the Eos family (606), the largest asteroid family in the outer main belt consisting of nearly 10,000 known members. It orbits the Sun at a distance of 2.7–3.3 AU once every 5 years and 3 months (1,907 days; semi-major axis of 3.01 AU). Its orbit has an eccentricity of 0.10 and an inclination of 9° with respect to the ecliptic.

In June 1910, the asteroid was first identified as A910 LB at the Heidelberg Observatory in Germany, where the body's observation arc begins with its identification as A920 JC in May 1920, almost 15 years prior to its official discovery observation at Johannesburg.

== Naming ==
This minor planet was named after Maartje (Nin) Maria Lindenburg Mekking (1924–2007), daughter of B.G. Mekking (1903–1971), an orbit computer at the Leiden Observatory. The official naming citation was mentioned in The Names of the Minor Planets by Paul Herget in 1955 (H 123).

== Physical characteristics ==
Maartje has been characterized as an L- and S-type asteroid by PanSTARRS photometric survey, while the overall spectral type of the Eos family is that of a K-type.

=== Rotation period and poles ===
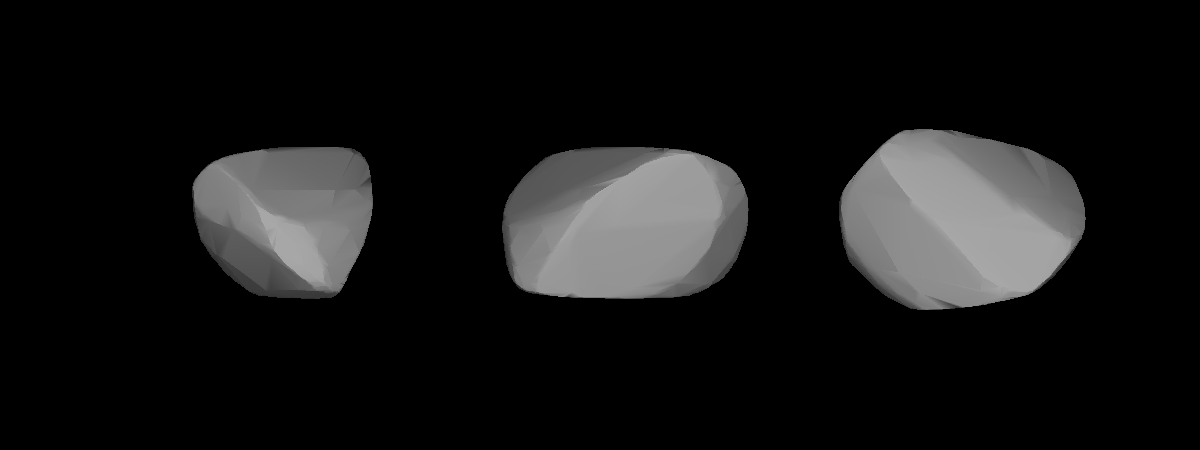
Lightcurve-based 3D-model of Maartje

Several rotational lightcurve of Maartje have been obtained from photometric observations since 2005. Lightcurve analysis gave a consolidated, slightly longer-than average, and well-defined rotation period of 22.930 hours with a brightness amplitude between 0.25 and 0.46 magnitude (U=3). The asteroid's lightcurve has also been modeled and gave two concurring periods of 22.9924 and 22.9926 hours. Modeling in 2018 determined two spin axis of (285.0°, 73.0°) and (119.0°, 41.0°) in ecliptic coordinates (λ, β).

=== Diameter and albedo ===
According to the surveys carried out by the Infrared Astronomical Satellite IRAS, the Japanese Akari satellite and the NEOWISE mission of NASA's Wide-field Infrared Survey Explorer, Maartje measures between 33.75 and 42.175 kilometers in diameter and its surface has an albedo between 0.0687 and 0.136.

The Collaborative Asteroid Lightcurve Link derives an albedo of 0.1660 and a diameter of 34.16 kilometers based on an absolute magnitude of 9.9.
