= 1689 Floris-Jan =

Main-belt asteroid

Discovery
- Discovered by: H. van Gent
- Discovery site: Johannesburg Obs. (Leiden Southern Station)
- Discovery date: 16 September 1930

Designations
- Named after: Floris-Jan van der Meulen (Contest Winner)
- Alternative designations: 1930 SO · 1926 PG; 1928 DN · 1934 VV; 1943 AC · 1949 OF; 1949 ON_{1} · 1949 OY; 1951 CW · 1966 BP
- Minor planet category: main-belt · (inner)

Orbital characteristics
- Epoch 4 September 2017 (JD 2458000.5)
- Uncertainty parameter 0
- Observation arc: 89.19 yr (32,577 days)
- Aphelion: 2.9545 AU
- Perihelion: 1.9461 AU
- Semi-major axis: 2.4503 AU
- Eccentricity: 0.2058
- Orbital period (sidereal): 3.84 yr (1,401 days)
- Mean anomaly: 218.98°
- Mean motion: 0° 15^{m} 25.2^{s} / day
- Inclination: 6.3757°
- Longitude of ascending node: 123.19°
- Argument of perihelion: 265.10°

Physical characteristics
- Dimensions: 13.743±1.905 km 13.99±0.23 km 16.122±4.950 km 16.21 km (taken); 16.213 km
- Synodic rotation period: 0.083 h (fragm.); 144.85±0.20 h 145 h
- Geometric albedo: 0.1271±0.0508; 0.1353; 0.175±0.050; 0.184±0.007
- Spectral type: S B–V = 0.685; U–B = 0.265
- Absolute magnitude (H): 11.74±0.05 · 11.79±0.19 · 11.82

1689 Floris-Jan, provisional designation 1930 SO, is a stony asteroid and a slow rotator from the inner regions of the asteroid belt, approximately 16 kilometers in diameter. Discovered by Hendrik van Gent in 1930, it was named after a contest winner of an exhibition at Leiden Observatory.

== Discovery ==
The asteroid was discovered on 16 September 1930, by Dutch astronomer Hendrik van Gent at the Leiden Southern Station, annex to the Johannesburg Observatory in South Africa. It was independently discovered by Soviet astronomer Evgenii Skvortsov at the Crimean Simeiz Observatory five days later.

== Orbit and classification ==
Floris-Jan orbits the Sun in the inner main-belt at a distance of 1.9–3.0 AU once every 3 years and 10 months (1,401 days). Its orbit has an eccentricity of 0.21 and an inclination of 6° with respect to the ecliptic. First identified as 1926 PG at Simeiz Observatory in 1926, the body's observation arc begins 3 days after its official discovery observation at Johannesburg in 1930.

== Physical characteristics ==
=== Slow rotator ===
In the 1980s, photometric lightcurve observations already revealed that Floris-Jan is a very slow rotator with a rotation period of 145 hours and a brightness variation of 0.4 magnitude (U=3). At the time, this six-day period was a new record among all minor planets with a known rotation period, and it was assumed, that Floris-Jan might also be a tumbling asteroid with a non-principal axis rotation.

=== Diameter and albedo ===
According to the surveys carried out by the Japanese Akari satellite and NASA's Wide-field Infrared Survey Explorer with its subsequent NEOWISE mission, Floris-Jan measures between 13.74 and 16.12 kilometers in diameter, and its surface has an albedo between 0.127 and 0.184. The Collaborative Asteroid Lightcurve Link agrees with Petr Pravec's revised WISE-data, that is an albedo of 0.135 and a diameter of 16.21 kilometers based on an absolute magnitude of 11.74.

== Naming ==
This minor planet was named for Floris-Jan van der Meulen, the 5,000th visitor to a 14-day astronomical exhibition at the Leiden Observatory. The official naming citation was published by the Minor Planet Center on 1 March 1973 (M.P.C. 3470).
