= Limburgia =

- SV Limburgia, a Dutch football/sports club from the city of Brunssum, Netherlands.
- 1383 Limburgia, a minor planet+
