= 1753 Mieke =

Stony Eos asteroid

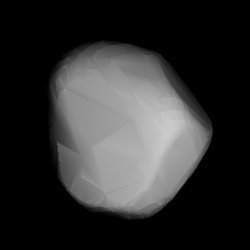
- Shape model of Mieke from its lightcurve

Discovery
- Discovered by: H. van Gent
- Discovery site: Johannesburg Obs. (Leiden Southern Station)
- Discovery date: 10 May 1934

Designations
- Named after: Mieke Oort (wife of Jan Oort)
- Alternative designations: 1934 JM · 1951 SM; 1951 VB · 1967 UG
- Minor planet category: main-belt · Eos

Orbital characteristics
- Epoch 4 September 2017 (JD 2458000.5)
- Uncertainty parameter 0
- Observation arc: 82.98 yr (30,307 days)
- Aphelion: 3.2624 AU
- Perihelion: 2.7733 AU
- Semi-major axis: 3.0178 AU
- Eccentricity: 0.0810
- Orbital period (sidereal): 5.24 yr (1,915 days)
- Mean anomaly: 289.63°
- Mean motion: 0° 11^{m} 16.8^{s} / day
- Inclination: 11.366°
- Longitude of ascending node: 58.433°
- Argument of perihelion: 229.49°

Physical characteristics
- Dimensions: 19.445±0.208; 19.55±0.60 km 19.604±0.289 km 21.40 km (calculated); 22.08±1.45 km
- Synodic rotation period: 8.8 h 10.19942±0.00001 h
- Geometric albedo: 0.14 (assumed); 0.144±0.021; 0.1672±0.0307; 0.173±0.012
- Spectral type: S
- Absolute magnitude (H): 10.80±0.33 · 11.00 · 11.1

1753 Mieke (prov. designation: 1934 JM) is a stony Eos asteroid from the outer region of the asteroid belt, approximately 20 kilometers in diameter. It was discovered on 10 May 1934, by Dutch astronomer Hendrik van Gent at the Leiden Southern Station, annex to the Johannesburg Observatory in South Africa. The asteroid was named after Mieke Oort, wife of Dutch astronomer Jan Oort.

== Orbit and classification ==
The S-type asteroid is a member of the Eos family, thought to have formed from a catastrophic collision of its parent body resulting in more than 4,000 known members of the family. It orbits the Sun in the outer main-belt at a distance of 2.8–3.3 AU once every 5 years and 3 months (1,915 days). Its orbit has an eccentricity of 0.08 and an inclination of 11° with respect to the ecliptic.

As no precoveries was taken, and no prior identifications were made, Mieke's observation arc begins with its official discovery observation at Johannesburg in 1934.

== Physical characteristics ==
=== Lightcurves ===
A rotational lightcurve of Mieke was obtained from photometric observations by Swedish astronomer Claes-Ingvar Lagerkvist analysis at Uppsala Observatory in March 1975. It gave a rotation period of 8.8 hours with a brightness variation of 0.20 magnitude (U=2). Published in March 2016, a modeled lightcurve, using the Lowell Photometric Database, gave a period of approximately 10.199 hours (U=n.a.).

=== Diameter and albedo ===
According to the surveys carried out by the Japanese Akari satellite and NASA's Wide-field Infrared Survey Explorer with its subsequent NEOWISE mission, Mieke measures between 19.44 and 22.08 kilometers in diameter, and its surface has an albedo between 0.144 and 0.173. The Collaborative Asteroid Lightcurve Link assumes an albedo of 0.14 and calculates a diameter of 21.40 kilometers based on an absolute magnitude of 11.1.

== Naming ==
This minor planet was named for Mieke Oort-Graadt van Roggen (1906–1993), wife of Dutch astronomy legend Jan Oort, who was director of the Leiden Observatory from 1945–1970. He had previously been honoured with the asteroid 1691 Oort. The official naming citation was published by the Minor Planet Center on 1 June 1980 (M.P.C. 5357).
