= 1225 Ariane =

Main-belt asteroid

Discovery
- Discovered by: H. van Gent
- Discovery site: Johannesburg Obs. (Leiden Southern Station)
- Discovery date: 23 April 1930

Designations
- Named after: "Ariane Leprieur" (fictional character)
- Alternative designations: 1930 HK · 1928 UD; 1958 TB
- Minor planet category: main-belt · Flora

Orbital characteristics
- Epoch 4 September 2017 (JD 2458000.5)
- Uncertainty parameter 0
- Observation arc: 88.64 yr (32,374 days)
- Aphelion: 2.4002 AU
- Perihelion: 2.0657 AU
- Semi-major axis: 2.2329 AU
- Eccentricity: 0.0749
- Orbital period (sidereal): 3.34 yr (1,219 days)
- Mean anomaly: 150.36°
- Mean motion: 0° 17^{m} 43.44^{s} / day
- Inclination: 3.0739°
- Longitude of ascending node: 12.381°
- Argument of perihelion: 100.66°

Physical characteristics
- Dimensions: 9.194±0.091
- Synodic rotation period: 5.5068±0.0001 h
- Geometric albedo: 0.302±0.047
- Spectral type: S
- Absolute magnitude (H): 12.1

1225 Ariane, provisional designation 1930 HK, is a stony Florian asteroid from the inner regions of the asteroid belt, approximately 9 kilometers in diameter. It was discovered on 23 April 1930, by Dutch astronomer Hendrik van Gent at the Leiden Southern Station, annex to the Johannesburg Observatory in South Africa.

== Orbit and characterization ==
Ariane orbits the Sun at a distance of 2.1–2.4 AU once every 3 years and 4 months (1,219 days). Its orbit has an eccentricity of 0.07 and an inclination of 3° with respect to the ecliptic.

Photometric observations made in 2003 at the U.S. Carbuncle Hill Observatory (912) near Providence, Rhode Island, give a synodic rotation period of 5.529±0.002 hours. The light curve shows a brightness variation of 0.40±0.02 in magnitude.

== Naming ==
This minor planet was named after "Ariane Leprieur", the principal role in the play Le Chemin de Crête by Gabriel Marcel (1889–1973). The official naming citation was first mentioned in The Names of the Minor Planets by Paul Herget in 1955 (H 96).
