= 1585 Union =

Dark background asteroid

Discovery
- Discovered by: E. L. Johnson
- Discovery site: Union Obs.
- Discovery date: 7 September 1947

Designations
- Named after: Union Observatory (aka Johannesburg Obs.)
- Alternative designations: 1947 RG · 1929 DB; 1937 QF · 1939 CD_{1} 1944 DG · 1949 EE; 1952 QA_{1} · 1952 SD
- Minor planet category: main-belt · (outer)

Orbital characteristics
- Epoch 4 September 2017 (JD 2458000.5)
- Uncertainty parameter 0
- Observation arc: 78.37 yr (28,624 days)
- Aphelion: 3.8332 AU
- Perihelion: 2.0231 AU
- Semi-major axis: 2.9281 AU
- Eccentricity: 0.3091
- Orbital period (sidereal): 5.01 yr (1,830 days)
- Mean anomaly: 304.39°
- Mean motion: 0° 11^{m} 48.12^{s} / day
- Inclination: 26.187°
- Longitude of ascending node: 150.10°
- Argument of perihelion: 264.54°

Physical characteristics
- Dimensions: 49.01±18.07 km 50.42±1.6 km 50.68±0.88 km 55.271±0.243 km 55.42±18.20 km 56.014±0.292 km
- Synodic rotation period: 9.38 h 24 h (fragmentary)
- Geometric albedo: 0.0304±0.0028; 0.031±0.004; 0.0378±0.003; 0.038±0.001; 0.04±0.04; 0.05±0.02
- Spectral type: P · C B–V = 0.590; U–B = 0.290
- Absolute magnitude (H): 10.33±0.22 · 10.35 · 10.66 · 10.67

1585 Union, provisional designation 1947 RG, is a dark background asteroid from the outer regions of the asteroid belt, approximately 52 kilometers in diameter. It was discovered on 7 September 1947, by South African astronomer Ernest Johnson at the Union Observatory in Johannesburg, South Africa. The asteroid was named after the discovering observatory.

== Orbit and classification ==
Union is not a member of any known asteroid family. It orbits the Sun in the outer main belt at a distance of 2.0–3.8 AU once every 5.01 years (1,830 days). Its orbit has an eccentricity of 0.31 and an inclination of 26° with respect to the ecliptic.

In 1929, the asteroid was first identified as 1929 DB at the Uccle Observatory in Belgium. The body's observation arc begins at the Finnish Turku Observatory in February 1939, more than 17 years prior to its official discovery observation at Johannesburg.

== Physical characteristics ==
Union has been characterized as a P-type asteroid by the Wide-field Infrared Survey Explorer (WISE), while the LCDB assumes a generic carbonaceous C-type.

=== Rotation period ===
In March 1984, a rotational lightcurve of Union was obtained from photometric observations by American astronomer Richard Binzel. Lightcurve analysis gave a rotation period of 9.38 hours with a brightness variation of 0.22 magnitude (U=2). In addition, a fragmentary lightcurve with a period of 24 hours was obtained by French amateur astronomer Laurent Bernasconi in 2004 (U=1).

=== Diameter and albedo ===
According to the surveys carried out by the Infrared Astronomical Satellite IRAS, the Japanese Akari satellite and the NEOWISE mission of NASA's WISE telescope, Union measures between 49.01 and 56.014 kilometers in diameter and its surface has an albedo between 0.0304 and 0.05.

The Collaborative Asteroid Lightcurve Link adopt the results obtained by IRAS, that is, an albedo of 0.0378 and a diameter of 50.42 kilometers. CALL also takes an absolute magnitude of 10.67 from Richard Binzel.

== Naming ==
This minor planet was named after the discovering Union Observatory, also known as the Johannesburg Observatory, Transvaal Observatory (1909–1912) and Republic Observatory (1961–1971). The official naming citation was published by the Minor Planet Center in June 1953 (M.P.C. 941).
