= 1946 Walraven =

Stony main-belt asteroid

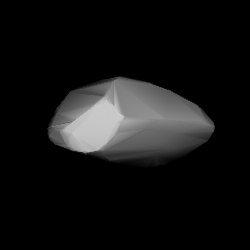
- Modelled shape of Walraven from its lightcurve

Discovery
- Discovered by: H. van Gent
- Discovery site: Johannesburg Obs. (Leiden Southern Station)
- Discovery date: 8 August 1931

Designations
- Named after: Theodore Walraven (astronomer)
- Alternative designations: 1931 PH · 1952 PB; 1959 RE_{1} · 1966 TC; 1972 JE_{1}
- Minor planet category: main-belt · (inner)

Orbital characteristics
- Epoch 4 September 2017 (JD 2458000.5)
- Uncertainty parameter 0
- Observation arc: 85.73 yr (31,314 days)
- Aphelion: 2.8329 AU
- Perihelion: 1.7564 AU
- Semi-major axis: 2.2947 AU
- Eccentricity: 0.2346
- Orbital period (sidereal): 3.48 yr (1,270 days)
- Mean anomaly: 242.32°
- Mean motion: 0° 17^{m} 0.6^{s} / day
- Inclination: 8.1606°
- Longitude of ascending node: 17.269°
- Argument of perihelion: 340.01°

Physical characteristics
- Mean diameter: 9.205±0.109 km 11.83 km (calculated)
- Synodic rotation period: 10.21±0.01 h 10.2101±0.0005 h 10.22±0.02 h 10.223 h
- Geometric albedo: 0.20 (assumed); 0.362±0.067
- Spectral type: S
- Absolute magnitude (H): 11.9 · 12.0

1946 Walraven (prov. designation: 1931 PH) is a stony asteroid from the inner regions of the asteroid belt, approximately 10 kilometers in diameter. It was discovered on 8 August 1931, by Dutch astronomer Hendrik van Gent at Leiden Southern Station, annex to the Johannesburg Observatory in South Africa, and named after astronomer Theodore Walraven.

== Classification and orbit ==
Walraven is a stony S-type asteroid that orbits the Sun in the inner main-belt at a distance of 1.8–2.8 AU once every 3 years and 6 months (1,270 days). Its orbit has an eccentricity of 0.23 and an inclination of 8° with respect to the ecliptic. The body's observation arc begins one day prior to its official discovery observation.

== Naming ==
This minor planet was named in honor of astronomer and pioneer in optical instrumentation and precision photometry, Theodore Fjeda Walraven (1916–2008), who was a professor at the Leiden University and for many years resident astronomer at the former Leiden Southern Station near Hartbeespoortdam, South Africa.

Walraven constructed special photometers for the telescopes at the station, including the 5-color photometer for which he developed the Walraven photometric system. The approved naming citation was published by the Minor Planet Center on 2 April 1988 (M.P.C. 12968).

== Physical characteristics ==
=== Rotation period ===
Four rotational lightcurves of Walraven were obtained from photometric observation, giving a rotation period between 10.210 and 10.223 hours with a brightness variation of 0.60 to 0.90 magnitude (U=2+/n.a./2/2).

=== Diameter and albedo ===
According to the survey carried out by NASA's Wide-field Infrared Survey Explorer with its subsequent NEOWISE mission, Walraven measures 9.2 kilometers in diameter and its surface has an albedo of 0.362, while the Collaborative Asteroid Lightcurve Link assumes a standard albedo for stony asteroids of 0.20, and calculates a diameter of 11.8 kilometers with an absolute magnitude of 12.0.
