= 1384 Kniertje =

Dark Adeonian asteroid

Discovery
- Discovered by: H. van Gent
- Discovery site: Johannesburg Obs.
- Discovery date: 9 September 1934

Designations
- Named after: Kniertje (fictional character)
- Alternative designations: 1934 RX
- Minor planet category: main-belt · (middle); Eunomia · Adeona

Orbital characteristics
- Epoch 4 September 2017 (JD 2458000.5)
- Uncertainty parameter 0
- Observation arc: 83.06 yr (30,338 days)
- Aphelion: 3.1649 AU
- Perihelion: 2.1872 AU
- Semi-major axis: 2.6760 AU
- Eccentricity: 0.1827
- Orbital period (sidereal): 4.38 yr (1,599 days)
- Mean anomaly: 288.15°
- Mean motion: 0° 13^{m} 30.36^{s} / day
- Inclination: 11.858°
- Longitude of ascending node: 152.86°
- Argument of perihelion: 276.17°

Physical characteristics
- Dimensions: 21.52±6.01 km 21.72±6.93 km 26.14±0.56 km 26.29±0.38 km 26.517±0.090 km 26.59 km (derived); 27.51±1.6 km 29.592±0.230 km
- Synodic rotation period: 9.78±0.02 h 9.807±0.002 h 9.808±0.001 h 9.824±0.001 h 9.872±0.012 h 12.255±0.004 h (Note: Lightcurve plot of 1384 Kniertje, Palmer Divide Observatory, Brian D. Warner (2006). Observer's comment: "a period of 9.816 h cannot be formally excluded". Summary figures at LCDB.)
- Geometric albedo: 0.0351±0.0035; 0.06±0.03; 0.064±0.006; 0.066±0.003; 0.07±0.05; 0.0701 (derived); 0.3077±0.039
- Spectral type: S (assumed, Eunomia); C (assumed; Adeona)
- Absolute magnitude (H): 9.70 · 11.38 · 11.4 · 11.50 · 11.60 · 11.64 · 11.81±0.22

1384 Kniertje, provisional designation 1934 RX, is a dark Adeonian asteroid from the central regions of the asteroid belt, approximately 26 kilometers in diameter. It was discovered on 9 September 1934, by Dutch astronomer Hendrik van Gent at the Union Observatory in Johannesburg, South Africa. The asteroid was named after a character in the Dutch play Op Hoop van Zegen by Herman Heijermans.

== Orbit and classification ==
Kniertje is a member of the Adeona family (505), a large family of carbonaceous asteroids in the central main belt, named after 145 Adeona. It is also dynamically classified as a member of the Eunomia family (502), the largest in the intermediate main belt with more than 5,000 stony asteroids.

The asteroid orbits the Sun in the central asteroid belt at a distance of 2.2–3.2 AU once every 4 years and 5 months (1,599 days). Its orbit has an eccentricity of 0.18 and an inclination of 12° with respect to the ecliptic. The body's observation arc begins with its official discovery observation at Johannesburg in 1934.

== Physical characteristics ==
Kniertje's spectral type is unknown. Although the LCDB assumes an S-type (due to its dynamical classification to the stony Eunomia family), a low albedo of 0.0701 is derived (see below) which is typical for carbonaceous C-type asteroids and in agreement with the overall spectral type of the Adeona family (505).

=== Rotation period ===
Several rotational lightcurves of Kniertje have been obtained from photometric observations since 2003. Lightcurve analysis gave a rotation period between 9.78 and 9.872 hours with a brightness variation between 0.15 and 0.32 magnitude (U=2/2/2/2/2). An alternative period solution of 12.255 hours with an amplitude of 0.33 magnitude was found by Brian Warner in March 2006 (U=2).

=== Diameter and albedo ===
According to the surveys carried out by the Infrared Astronomical Satellite IRAS, the Japanese Akari satellite and the NEOWISE mission of NASA's Wide-field Infrared Survey Explorer, Kniertje measures between 21.52 and 29.592 kilometers in diameter and its surface has an albedo between 0.0351 and 0.3077.

The Collaborative Asteroid Lightcurve Link derives an albedo of 0.0701 and a diameter of 26.59 kilometers based on an absolute magnitude of 11.38.

== Naming ==
This minor planet was named after the principal character in Op Hoop van Zegen, a play by Dutch writer Herman Heijermans (1864–1924). The official naming citation was mentioned in The Names of the Minor Planets by Paul Herget in 1955 (H 125).
