= 1879 Broederstroom =

Stony main-belt asteroid

Discovery
- Discovered by: H. van Gent
- Discovery site: Johannesburg Obs. (Leiden Southern Station)
- Discovery date: 16 October 1935

Designations
- Named after: Broederstroom (town)
- Alternative designations: 1935 UN · 1950 AD; 1950 CV · 1950 DB_{1} 1972 RS_{1} · 1984 HJ_{2}
- Minor planet category: main-belt · Flora

Orbital characteristics
- Epoch 4 September 2017 (JD 2458000.5)
- Uncertainty parameter 0
- Observation arc: 81.46 yr (29,752 days)
- Aphelion: 2.5784 AU
- Perihelion: 1.9131 AU
- Semi-major axis: 2.2458 AU
- Eccentricity: 0.1481
- Orbital period (sidereal): 3.37 yr (1,229 days)
- Mean anomaly: 85.731°
- Mean motion: 0° 17^{m} 34.44^{s} / day
- Inclination: 1.7234°
- Longitude of ascending node: 249.98°
- Argument of perihelion: 173.96°

Physical characteristics
- Dimensions: 7.14 km (calculated); 7.444±0.235 km 7.66±0.52 km
- Synodic rotation period: 3.01555±0.00006 h 3.0159±0.0115 h 3.020±0.010 h
- Geometric albedo: 0.24 (assumed); 0.242±0.031; 0.319±0.048
- Spectral type: S
- Absolute magnitude (H): 12.50 · 12.766±0.001 (R) · 12.780±0.100 (R) · 12.80 · 12.9 · 13.45±0.28

1879 Broederstroom, provisional designation 1935 UN, is a stony Florian asteroid from the inner regions of the asteroid belt, approximately 7 kilometers in diameter. It was discovered on 16 October 1935, by Dutch astronomer Hendrik van Gent at the Leiden Southern Station (081), annex to the Johannesburg Observatory in South Africa. The asteroid was named after the South African village of Broederstroom.

== Orbit and classification ==
Broederstroom is a member of the Flora family. It orbits the Sun in the inner main-belt at a distance of 1.9–2.6 AU once every 3 years and 4 months (1,229 days). Its orbit has an eccentricity of 0.15 and an inclination of 2° with respect to the ecliptic.

No precoveries were taken, and no prior identifications were made. The body's observation arc begins with its official discovery observation at Johannesburg in 1935.

== Physical characteristics ==
Broederstroom has been characterized as a common stony S-type asteroid.

=== Lightcurves ===
In January 2007, a rotational lightcurve obtained by Italian amateur astronomer Antonio Vagnozzi gave a well-defined rotation period of 3.01555 hours with a brightness variation of 0.11 magnitude (U=3). In Spring 2014, photometry at the Palomar Transient Factory in California gave two lightcurves with a period of 3.016 and 3.02 hours and an amplitude of 0.12 magnitude (U=2/2).

=== Diameter and albedo ===
According to the surveys carried out by the Japanese Akari satellite and NASA's Wide-field Infrared Survey Explorer with its subsequent NEOWISE mission, Broederstroom measures 7.444 and 7.66 kilometers in diameter and its surface has an albedo of 0.242 and 0.319, respectively. The Collaborative Asteroid Lightcurve Link assumes an albedo of 0.24 – derived from the asteroid 8 Flora, the family's principal body and namesake – and calculates a diameter of 7.14 kilometers with an absolute magnitude of 13.42.

== Naming ==
This minor planet was named after the village Broederstroom located in the North West province of South Africa. The Leiden Southern Observatory was later located near this town for 25 years until 1982. The official naming citation was published by the Minor Planet Center on 8 April 1982 (M.P.C. 6833).
