= 1336 Zeelandia =

Stony Koronian asteroid

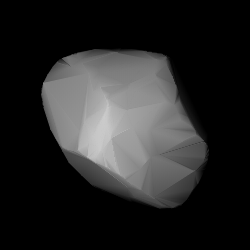
- Shape model of Zeelandia from its lightcurve

Discovery
- Discovered by: H. van Gent
- Discovery site: Johannesburg Obs.
- Discovery date: 9 September 1934

Designations
- Named after: Zeeland (a province of the Netherlands)
- Alternative designations: 1934 RW · 1929 QE; 1930 XC · 1935 YF; 1939 RP · A906 YO
- Minor planet category: main-belt · (outer); Koronis

Orbital characteristics
- Epoch 4 September 2017 (JD 2458000.5)
- Uncertainty parameter 0
- Observation arc: 112.01 yr (40,913 days)
- Aphelion: 3.0348 AU
- Perihelion: 2.6654 AU
- Semi-major axis: 2.8501 AU
- Eccentricity: 0.0648
- Orbital period (sidereal): 4.81 yr (1,757 days)
- Mean anomaly: 117.20°
- Mean motion: 0° 12^{m} 17.28^{s} / day
- Inclination: 3.1972°
- Longitude of ascending node: 97.420°
- Argument of perihelion: 220.01°

Physical characteristics
- Dimensions: 19.18±0.51 km 20.99±2.1 km 21.441±0.132 km 23.056±0.108 km 23.63±3.31 km
- Synodic rotation period: 15.602 h 15.624±0.001 h
- Geometric albedo: 0.153±0.280; 0.1829±0.0228; 0.2183±0.052; 0.232±0.045; 0.273±0.017
- Spectral type: B–V = 0.810; U–B = 0.366; Tholen = S SMASS = S
- Absolute magnitude (H): 10.66 · 10.71±0.58 · 10.79 · 10.94±0.02

1336 Zeelandia, provisional designation 1934 RW, is a stony Koronian asteroid from the outer regions of the asteroid belt, approximately 21 kilometers in diameter. It was discovered on 9 September 1934, by Dutch astronomer Hendrik van Gent at the Union Observatory in Johannesburg, South Africa. The asteroid was named for the Dutch province of Zeeland.

== Orbit and classification ==
Zeelandia belongs to the Koronis family (605), a very large asteroid family of 6,000 known members with stony composition and nearly co-planar ecliptical orbits.

It orbits the Sun in the outer main-belt at a distance of 2.7–3.0 AU once every 4 years and 10 months (1,757 days; semi-major axis of 2.85 AU). Its orbit has an eccentricity of 0.06 and an inclination of 3° with respect to the ecliptic. In October 1905, a first precovery was taken at the Lowell Observatory in Arizona. Its first identification as A906 YO was made at Taunton Observatory (803) in December 1906. The body's observation arc begins with its official discovery observation at Johannesburg in September 1934.

== Physical characteristics ==
Zeelandia has been characterized as a stony S-type asteroid in both the Tholen and SMASS classification.

=== Rotation period ===
In March 2004, a rotational lightcurve of Zeelandia was obtained from photometric observations by a collaboration of American astronomers. Lightcurve analysis gave a well-defined rotation period of 15.602 hours with a brightness variation of 0.61 magnitude (U=3). The result was confirmed by photometrists Pierre Antonini, Federico Manzini, Julian Oey and Frederick Pilcher, as well as Hiromi and Hiroko Hamanowa, who measured a similar period of 15.624 with an amplitude of 0.50 magnitude in April 2005 (U=3).

=== Diameter and albedo ===
According to the surveys carried out by the Infrared Astronomical Satellite IRAS, the Japanese Akari satellite, and the NEOWISE mission of NASA's Wide-field Infrared Survey Explorer, Zeelandia measures between 19.18 and 23.63 kilometers in diameter and its surface has an albedo between 0.153 and 0.273.

The Collaborative Asteroid Lightcurve Link adopts the results obtained by IRAS, that is, an albedo of 0.2183 and a diameter of 20.99 kilometers based on an absolute magnitude of 10.66.

== Naming ==
This minor planet was named for the Dutch province of Zeeland. The official naming citation was mentioned in The Names of the Minor Planets by Paul Herget in 1955 (H 121).
