= Hendrik van Gent =

Dutch astronomer (1899–1947)

Asteroids discovered: 39
see § List of discovered minor planets

Hendrik van Gent (14 September 1899, Pernis – March 29, 1947, Amsterdam) was a Dutch astronomer.

He moved to South Africa in 1928 in order to observe the southern sky at the Leiden Southern Station and the Union Observatory in Johannesburg. He obtained his PhD from Leiden University in 1931. He studied variable stars and also discovered three comets, namely C/1941 K1, C/1944 K2 and C/1943 W1. The Minor Planet Center credits him with the discovery of 39 numbered minor planets during 1929–1935.

He died of a heart attack at the age of 47 while on leave in the Netherlands. The crater Van Gent on the far side of the Moon, and the asteroid 1666 van Gent are named after him.

== List of discovered minor planets ==
1132 Hollandia	September 13, 1929
1133 Lugduna	September 13, 1929
1165 Imprinetta	April 24, 1930
1225 Ariane	April 23, 1930
1226 Golia	April 22, 1930
1267 Geertruida	April 23, 1930
1336 Zeelandia	September 9, 1934
1337 Gerarda	September 9, 1934
1342 Brabantia	February 13, 1935
1353 Maartje	February 13, 1935
1383 Limburgia	September 9, 1934
1384 Kniertje	September 9, 1934
1385 Gelria	May 24, 1935
1389 Onnie	September 28, 1935
1666 van Gent	July 22, 1930

1667 Pels	September 16, 1930
1670 Minnaert	September 9, 1934
1686 De Sitter	September 28, 1935
1689 Floris-Jan	September 16, 1930
1693 Hertzsprung	May 5, 1935
1694 Kaiser	September 29, 1934
1738 Oosterhoff	September 16, 1930
1752 van Herk	July 22, 1930
1753 Mieke	May 10, 1934
1879 Broederstroom	October 16, 1935
1914 Hartbeespoortdam	September 28, 1930
1925 Franklin-Adams	September 9, 1934
1945 Wesselink	July 22, 1930
1946 Walraven	August 8, 1931
1986 Plaut	September 28, 1935

2019 van Albada	September 28, 1935
2203 van Rhijn	September 28, 1935
2378 Pannekoek	February 13, 1935
2801 Huygens	September 28, 1935
2831 Stevin	September 17, 1930
2945 Zanstra	September 28, 1935
4296 van Woerkom	September 28, 1935
4359 Berlage	September 28, 1935
4511 Rembrandt	September 28, 1935
