= 1383 Limburgia =

Asteroid

Discovery
- Discovered by: H. van Gent
- Discovery site: Johannesburg Obs. (Leiden Southern Station)
- Discovery date: 9 September 1934

Designations
- Named after: Limburg (Dutch province)
- Alternative designations: 1934 RV · 1929 UQ; 1929 VJ · A923 PA
- Minor planet category: main-belt · (outer)

Orbital characteristics
- Epoch 16 February 2017 (JD 2457800.5)
- Uncertainty parameter 0
- Observation arc: 93.24 yr (34,057 days)
- Aphelion: 3.6641 AU
- Perihelion: 2.4903 AU
- Semi-major axis: 3.0772 AU
- Eccentricity: 0.1907
- Orbital period (sidereal): 5.40 yr (1,972 days)
- Mean anomaly: 81.370°
- Mean motion: 0° 10^{m} 57.36^{s} / day
- Inclination: 0.0526°
- Longitude of ascending node: 194.03°
- Argument of perihelion: 164.68°

Physical characteristics
- Dimensions: 22.18 km (derived); 22.84±6.23 km 23.399±0.039 km 24.29±0.16 km 25.186±0.086 km 26.66±0.27 km
- Synodic rotation period: 5 h
- Geometric albedo: 0.039±0.010; 0.04±0.00; 0.0419±0.0053; 0.05±0.05; 0.0569 (derived); 0.076±0.007
- Spectral type: C
- Absolute magnitude (H): 11.5 · 12.0 · 12.20±0.21 · 12.23

1383 Limburgia, provisional designation 1934 RV, is a carbonaceous asteroid from the outer region of the asteroid belt, approximately 23 kilometers in diameter. It was discovered on 9 September 1934, by Dutch astronomer Hendrik van Gent at the Leiden Southern Station, annex to the Johannesburg Observatory in South Africa. It is named for the Dutch province Limburg.

== Classification and orbit ==
Limburgia is a dark C-type asteroid. It orbits the Sun at a distance of 2.5–3.7 AU once every 5 years and 5 months (1,972 days). Its orbit has an eccentricity of 0.19 and an inclination of 0° with respect to the ecliptic, which means that it is coplanar with the orbit of Earth. It was first identified as A923 PA at Heidelberg Observatory in 1923, extending the body's observation arc by 11 years prior to its official discovery observation at Johannesburg.

== Rotation period ==
In December 2010, a rotational light-curve of Limburgia was obtained from photometric observations taken by James W. Brinsfield at the Via Capote Observatory (G69) in California. It gave a rotation period of 5 hours with a brightness variation of 0.07 magnitude (U=n.a.).

== Diameter and albedo ==
According to the surveys carried out by NASA's Wide-field Infrared Survey Explorer with its subsequent NEOWISE mission, Limburgia measures between 22.84 and 24.29 kilometers in diameter, and its surface has an albedo between 0.04 and 0.076. In contrast, preliminary figures gave a larger diameter of 25.18 and 26.66 kilometers, respectively. The Collaborative Asteroid Lightcurve Link derives an albedo of 0.0569 and a diameter of 22.18 kilometers using an absolute magnitude of 12.0.

== Naming ==
This minor planet was named after the Dutch province Limburg, the southernmost of the 12 provinces of the Netherlands. Naming was first cited in The Names of the Minor Planets by Paul Herget in 1955 (H 125).
