= Ejnar Hertzsprung =

Danish chemist and astronomer (1873–1967)

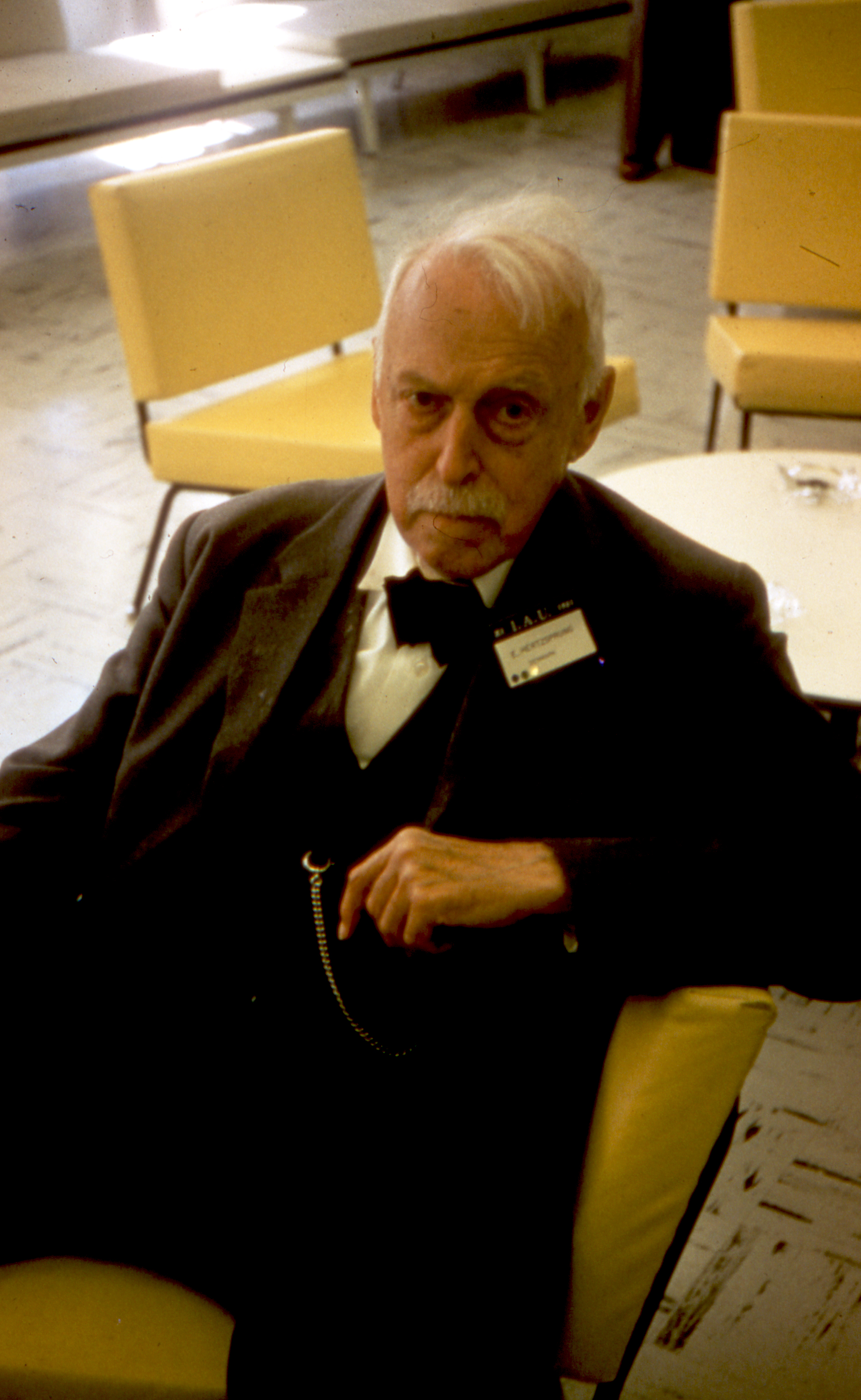
- Hertzsprung in 1961
- Born: 8 October 1873; Copenhagen, Denmark
- Died: 21 October 1967 (aged 94); Roskilde, Denmark
- Education: Copenhagen Polytechnic (DTU)
- Known for: Hertzsprung gap Hertzsprung–Russell diagram
- Spouse: Henriette Mariette Augustine Albertine Kapteijn (1881–1956)
- Parents: Severin Carl Ludvig Hertzsprung (father); Henriette Christiane Charlotte Frost (mother)
- Awards: Bruce Medal (1937); Gold Medal of RAS (1929)
- Scientific career
- Fields: Chemistry, Astronomy
- Workplaces: Leiden Observatory

Ejnar Hertzsprung (Danish: [ˈɑjnɐ ˈhɛɐ̯tsˌpʁɔŋ]; 8 October 1873 – 21 October 1967) was a Danish chemist and astronomer. He is best remembered for his role in developing the Hertzsprung–Russell diagram of stars.

== Career ==
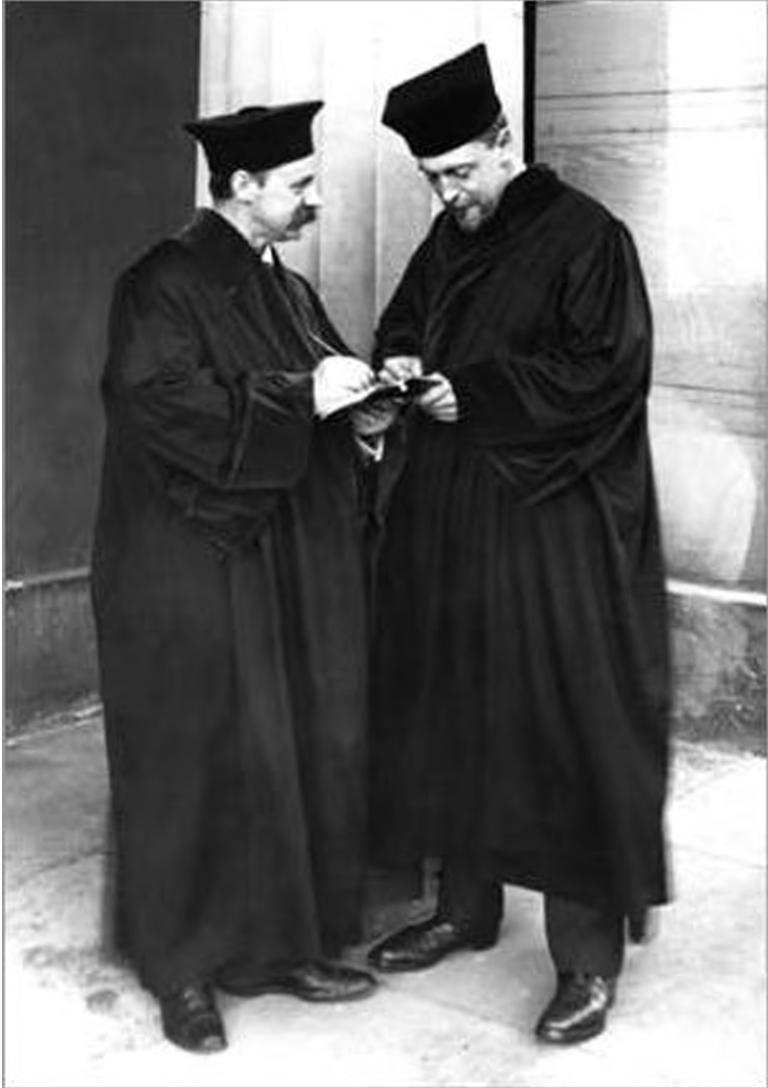
Hertzsprung (right) and Karl Schwarzschild in front of the Göttingen Observatory building (1909)

Hertzsprung was born in Frederiksberg, Denmark, the son of Severin and Henriette. He studied chemical engineering at Copenhagen Polytechnic Institute, graduating in 1898. After spending two years working as a chemist in St. Petersburg, in 1901 he studied photochemistry at Leipzig University for a year. His father was an amateur astronomer, which led to Ejnar's interest in the subject. He began making astronomical observations in Frederiksberg in 1902, and within a few years had noticed that stars with similar spectral type could have widely different absolute magnitudes. In 1909, he took a position at the Göttingen Observatory under director Karl Schwarzschild.

In 1911 Hertzsprung developed the Hertzsprung–Russell diagram, independently developed in 1913 by Henry Norris Russell.

In 1913 Hertzsprung determined the distances to several Cepheid variable stars by parallax, and was thus able to calibrate the relationship, discovered by Henrietta Leavitt, between Cepheid period and luminosity. In this determination he made a mistake, possibly a slip of the pen, putting the stars 10 times too close. He used this relationship to estimate the distance to the Small Magellanic Cloud. From 1919 to 1946, Hertzsprung worked at Leiden Observatory in the Netherlands, from 1937 as director. Among his graduate students at Leiden was Gerard Kuiper.

Perhaps his greatest contribution to astronomy was the development of a classification system for stars to divide them by spectral type, stage in their development, and luminosity. He used the earlier classification system developed by Antonia Maury in his work. The so-called "Hertzsprung–Russell Diagram" has been used ever since as a classification system to explain stellar types and stellar evolution. He also discovered two asteroids, one of which is 1627 Ivar, an Amor asteroid.

His wife Henrietta (1881–1956) was a daughter of the Dutch astronomer Jacobus Kapteyn. Hertzsprung died in Roskilde in 1967. The asteroid 1693 Hertzsprung was named in his honour.

== Asteroids discovered ==
- 1627 Ivar (25 September 1929)
- 1702 Kalahari (7 July 1924)

== Honors ==
Awards and honors

- Elected to the American Academy of Arts and Sciences in 1927
- Gold Medal of the Royal Astronomical Society in 1929
- Bruce Medal in 1937
- Elected to the American Philosophical Society in 1941

Named after him

- Lunar impact crater Hertzsprung
- Main-belt asteroid 1693 Hertzsprung

== Sources ==
- Sky & Telescope, January 1968, Sky Publishing Corporation, Cambridge
