= Gerrit Pels =

Dutch astronomer

Gerrit Pels (1893–1966) was a Dutch astronomer, a lifelong member of the scientific staff of the Leiden Observatory.

He was born in Woerden. After following secondary school in Utrecht, he was appointed "computer" at the Leiden observatory in 1919. Starting circa 1924, he studied Jupiter's Galilean satellites, minor planets, comets, and the proper motions of faint stars, in particular members of the Hyades cluster. He computed orbital characteristics for many of the minor planets discovered by Hendrik van Gent. Much of his work he did in collaboration with his wife, Helena Kluyver (1909–2001). She, together with Jan Oort, published their work on the Hyades cluster in 1975, 9 years after his death, in the journal Astronomy and Astrophysics .

The main-belt asteroid 1667 Pels was named in his honour by discoverer and colleague Hendrik van Gent (M.P.C. 2740).
