= Leiden Observatory =

Established 1633 in the Netherlands

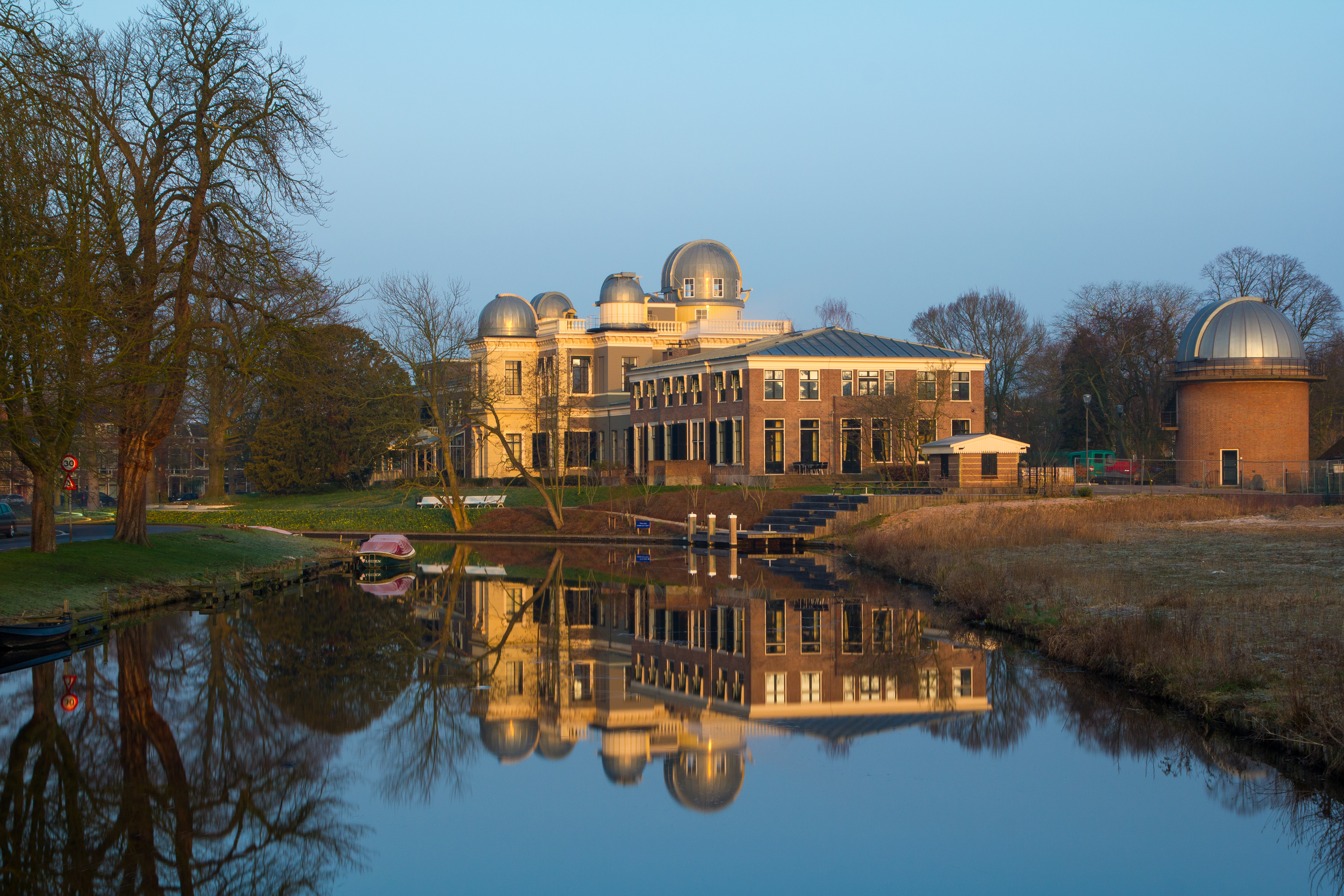
- Alternative names: Leiden observatory (before 1860)
- Organization: Leiden University
- Observatory code: 013
- Location: Leiden, Netherlands
- Coordinates: 52°10′04″N 4°27′39″E
- Website: www.universiteitleiden.nl/en/science/astronomy,%20https://www.universiteitleiden.nl/wiskunde-en-natuurwetenschappen/sterrenkunde
- Related media on Commons

Leiden Observatory (Dutch: Sterrewacht Leiden) is an astronomical institute of Leiden University, in the Netherlands. Established in 1633 to house the quadrant of Willebrord Snellius, it is the oldest operating university observatory in the world, with the only older still existing observatory being the Vatican Observatory.

The observatory was initially located on the university building in the centre of Leiden before a new observatory building and dome were constructed in the university's botanical garden in 1860. It remained there until 1974 when the department moved to the science campus north-west of the city. Notable astronomers that have worked or directed the observatory include Willem de Sitter, Ejnar Hertzsprung and Jan Oort.

== History ==
=== 1633–1860 ===
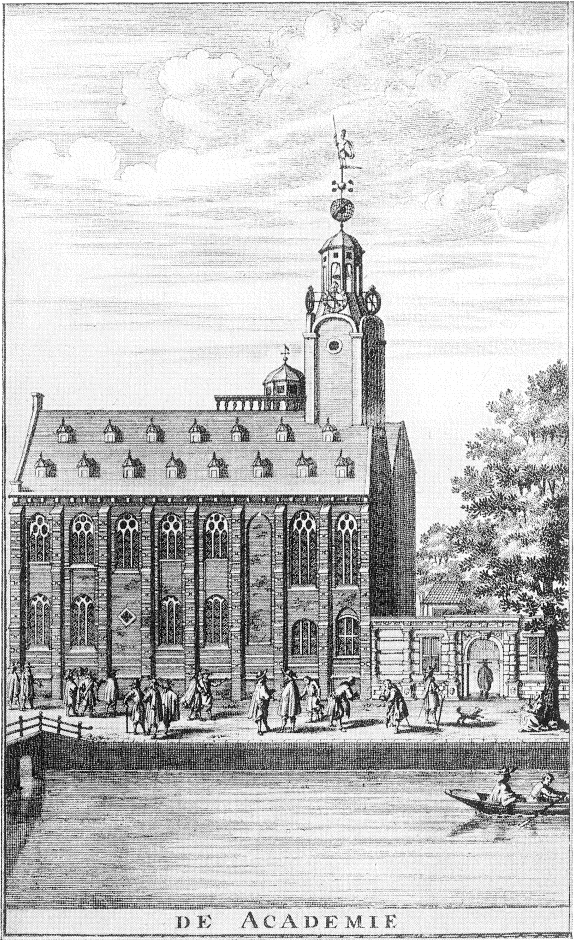
Drawing of Leiden Observatory in 1670, seen on top of the university building.

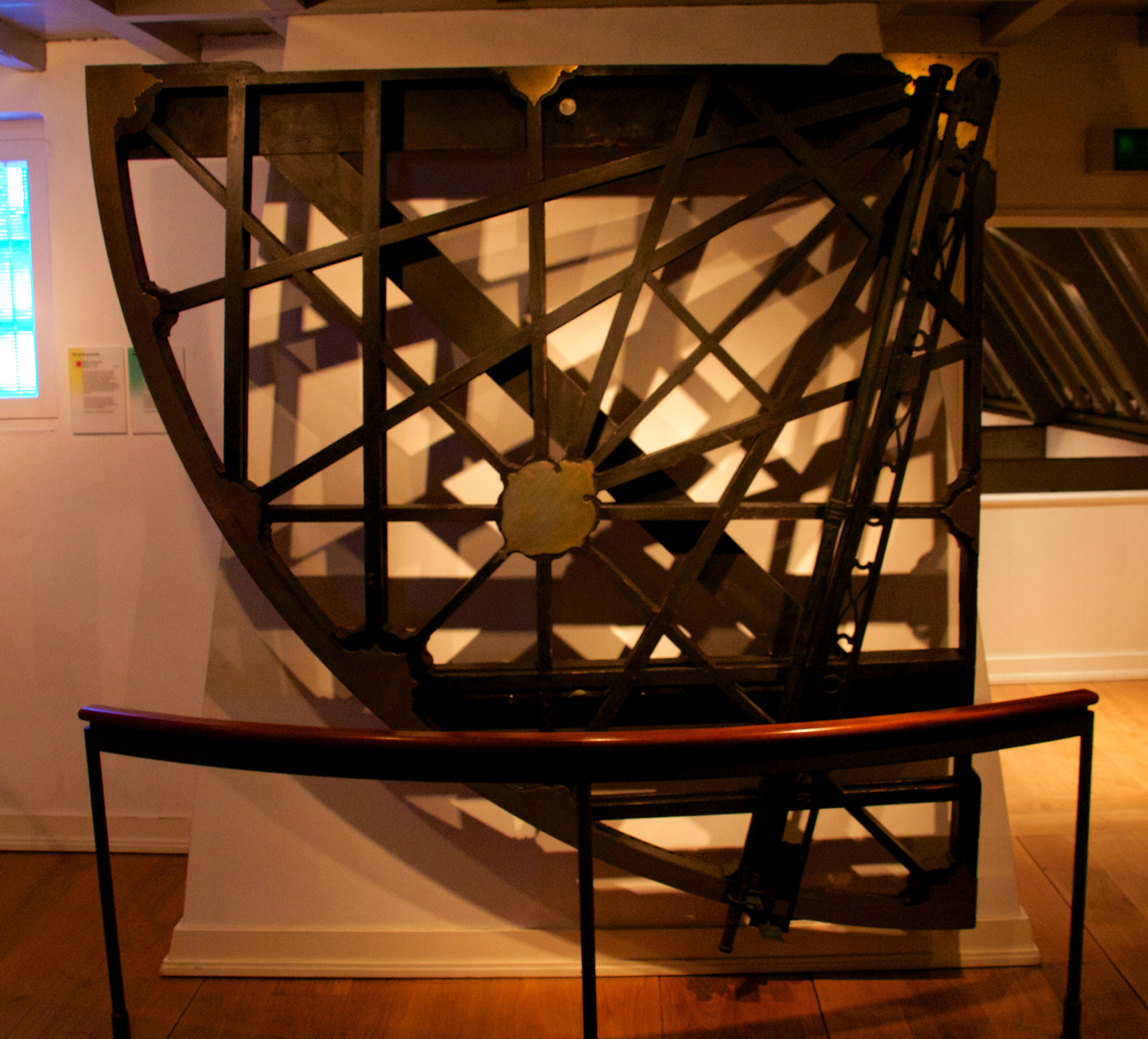
The 17th century (1600s), Quadrant instrument of Professor Willem Snel van Royen, displayed in a modern exhibit.

Leiden University established the observatory in 1633; astronomy had been on the curriculum for a long time, and due to possession of a large quadrant built by Rudolph Snellius, Jacobus Golius requested an observatory in which to use it. The observatory was one of the first purpose-built observatories in Europe. Though Golius used the observatory regularly, no publications came from its use by him. It is not known whether Golius had any instrumentation other than Snellius' quadrant at the observatory.

In 1682 Burchardus de Volder became professor of mathematics at the university and thus took over responsibility for the observatory. During his tenure, the observatory was enlarged, including a second turret to house a brass sextant which he purchased, and the rebuilding of the old turret. Both turrets had rotating roofs. Upon retiring in 1705, de Volder handed over a catalogue of instruments which showed that the observatory owned two other quadrants, a 12-inch telescope, two objectives, and several smaller telescopes. For the next two years, Lotharius Zumbach de Coesfeld ran the observatory until his appointment as professor of mathematics in Kassel in 1708. Between then and 1717 the observatory went without a director until Willem 's Gravesande was appointed director. During his time at the observatory, Gravesande purchased a number of new instruments including new telescopes and tools, before his death in 1742.

Gravesande's successor was Johan Lulofs who used the observatory to observe Halley's Comet in 1759 and solar transits of Mercury (in 1743 and 1753) and Venus (in 1761). In November 1768 when Lulofs died, Dionysius van de Wijnpersse took over responsibility for the observatory until Pieter Nieuwland became its director in 1793 for a year until he died in 1794. For a number of years the curators attempted to find a suitable astronomer to look after the observatory, eventually employing Jan Frederik van Beeck Calkoen in 1799, who left in 1805.

In 1817 the observatory towers were pulled down and rebuilt. Frederik Kaiser was appointed lecturer of astronomy and director of the observatory in 1837, and again renovated the observatory, providing the towers with rotatable roofs with full shutters, and reinforcing the north-western tower. Kaiser also acquired a number of new instruments and telescopes with which he made observations including that of comets, planets, and binary stars.

As a result of the increased interest in astronomy brought about due to Kaiser's popular writings and teachings, a commission was founded in 1853 to fund a new observatory. From 1859 to 1909 the Netherlands civil time was set according to the local civil time at the observatory; communicated using the telegraphic network.

=== 1860–1974 ===
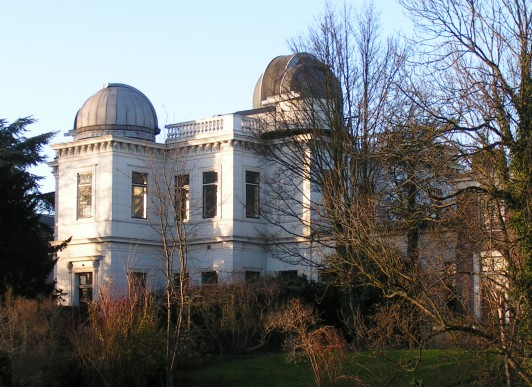
The second building to house the Leiden Observatory (built in 1860). This building now houses part of the law faculty. Two of the optical telescope domes can be seen on the roof.

By 1860 the new observatory building was completed. The new building was constructed in a quiet side of the city inside the university's botanical gardens. It consisted of a number of offices, living quarters for astronomers, and a number of observing domes containing telescopes. In 1873 two new rooms were added to the building in order to house the tools required to verify nautical instruments; tools used to test compasses, sextants and other instruments. Two of the domes were rebuilt, one in 1875 and the other in 1889.

More new buildings were constructed before the end of the 19th century including the Western tower in 1878, one to the East in 1898, and another small building to house a gas engine in the same year (used for electricity until the observatory was connected to the city grid). In 1896 the observatory purchased their first photographic telescope, with a dome being built to house it between then and 1898.

In 1923 the observatory formed a research agreement with Union Observatory to allow researchers use of both facilities. The first visitor from Leiden was Ejnar Hertzsprung. In 1954 the telescopes were moved to Hartbeespoort. The collaboration lasted until 1972.

The building is now called the Oude Sterrewacht (Old Observatory). It was restored from 2008 to 2012, and in the 2010s houses a visitor center and also has tours.

=== 1974-present ===
The astronomy department moved to the science campus north-west of the city centre in 1974. Although professional astronomical observations are no longer carried out from Leiden itself, the department still calls itself Leiden Observatory. In much of astronomy, the data came from elsewhere and could be analyzed and studied on the campus; for example in modern times the instruments may even be located in space, with data transmitted back to Earth and then studied on a computer display. (An example of this was the Astronomical Netherlands Satellite, launched in 1974.)

The archive of the Leiden Observatory is available at Leiden University Library and digitally accessible through Digital Collections

=== Einstein's Chair in the Ten-inch dome ===
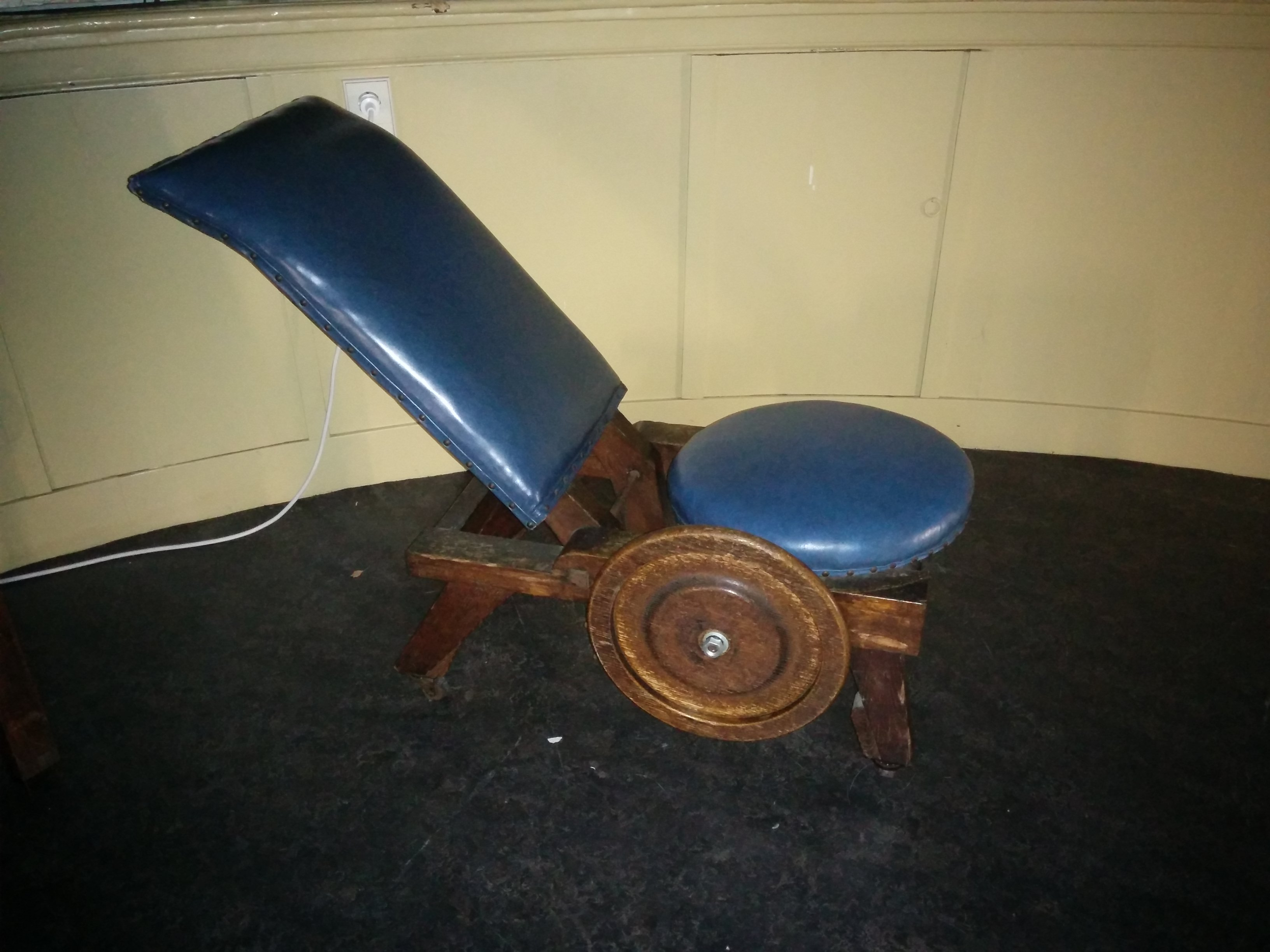
Einstein's Chair

Einstein's Chair is an astronomical observing chair at the Leiden Observatory. This chair, made in 1861, is the only piece of furniture in the observatory that dates from that time. The chair gets its name from the fact that it was used by Albert Einstein on several occasions during his visits to the observatory. Einstein was a frequent visitor of the building during his professorship at Leiden University due to his good friendship with the director, Willem de Sitter. The chair can be found in the largest dome of the observatory, the so-called 10-inch dome (named after the 10-inch telescope that is placed inside). The chair is still used by observers and a popular attraction at the observatory.

On 21 October 2015, Einstein's Chair got a short segment on the Dutch astronomy program Heel Nederland Kijkt Sterren. During this segment the science populariser Govert Schilling and the science historian David Baneke talked about its origins.

Einstein is noted for his visits to Leiden Observatory during World War I.

=== Restoration ===
The old Observatory building facilities (from 1860s) was restored in the 2010s. While not longer the base for the modern Leiden Observatory academically, it does have the astronomical historical items at the facility. Also, a solar telescope was crowd funded to provide live optically transmitted images of the Sun to the Visitor center, which is also known to have offered tours.

== Archive ==
The archives of the Leiden Observatory and its successive directors, 1829-1992 are held at Leiden University Libraries and are digitally available.

== Gallery ==
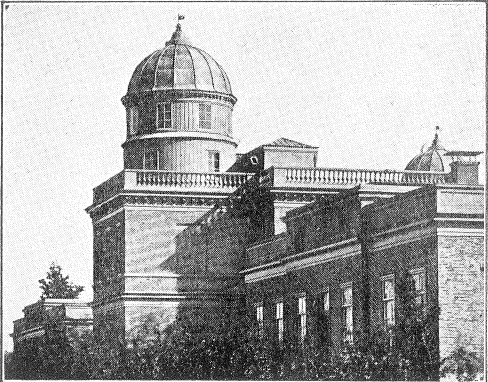
Leiden Observatory in 1861 from the north-west direction.

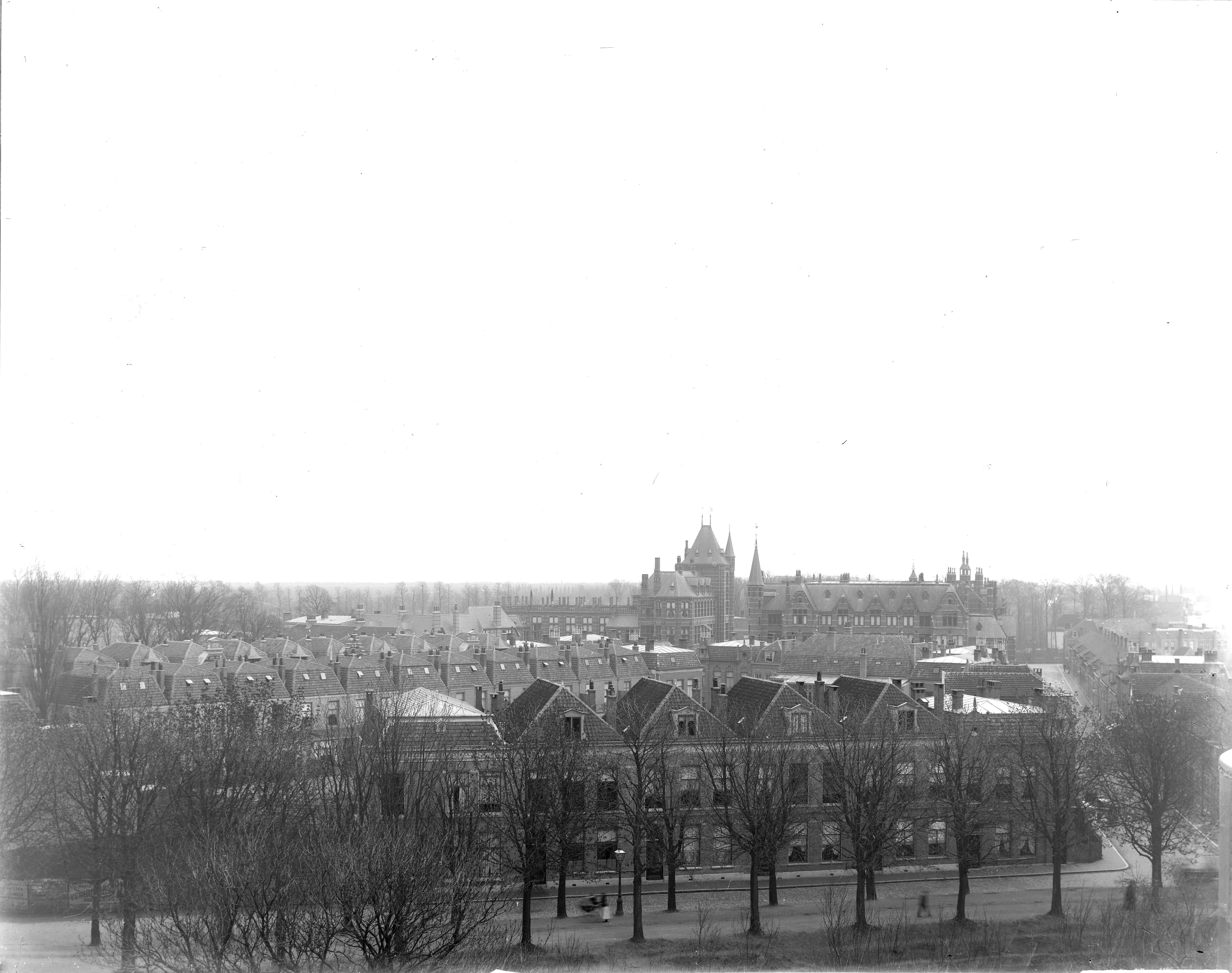
Panoramic view of Leiden from the Observatory. Glass negative, ca. 1900

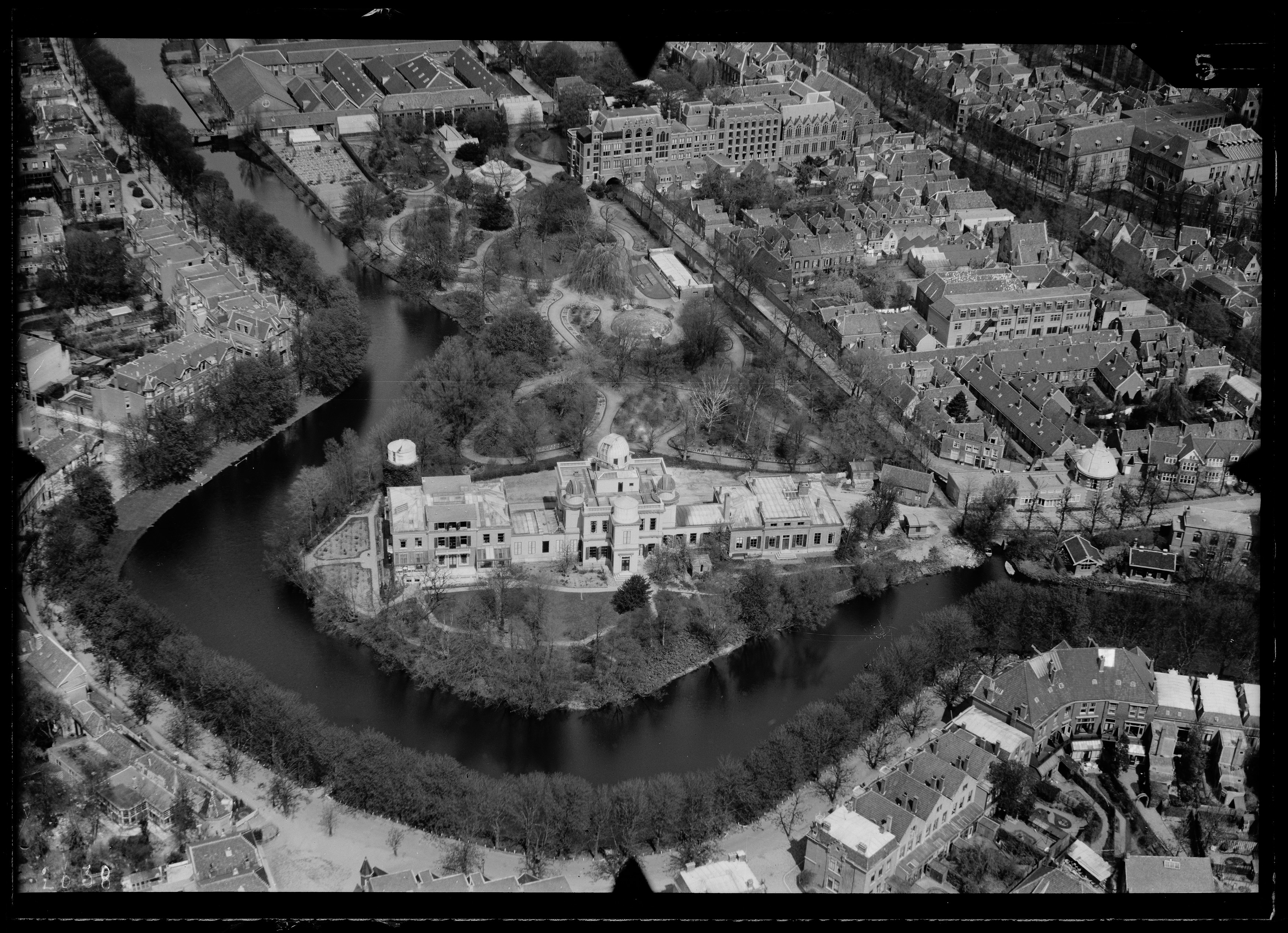
Observatory and Hortus botanicus, ca. 1920–1940

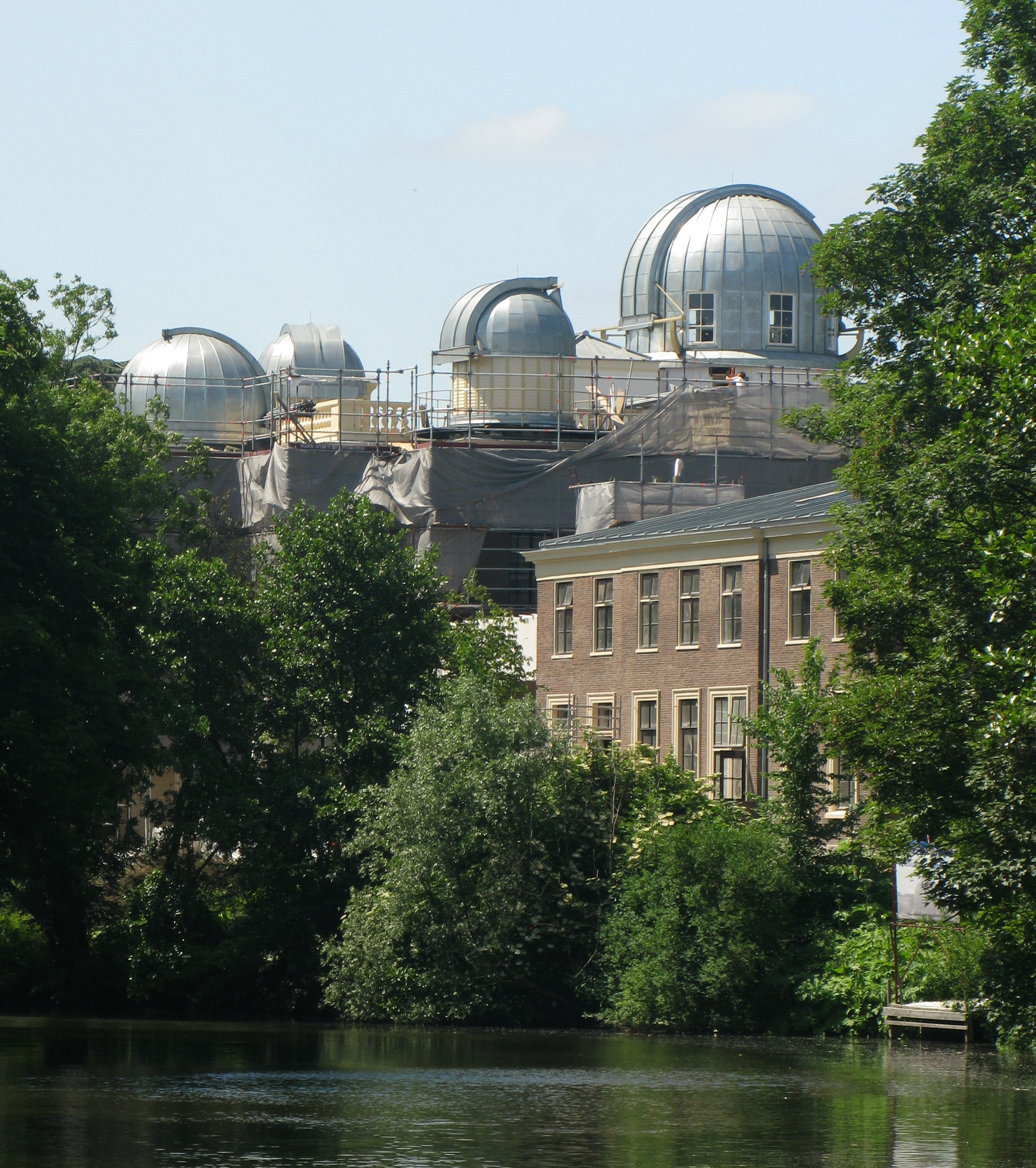
The second building to house the Leiden Observatory, during restoration (2010).

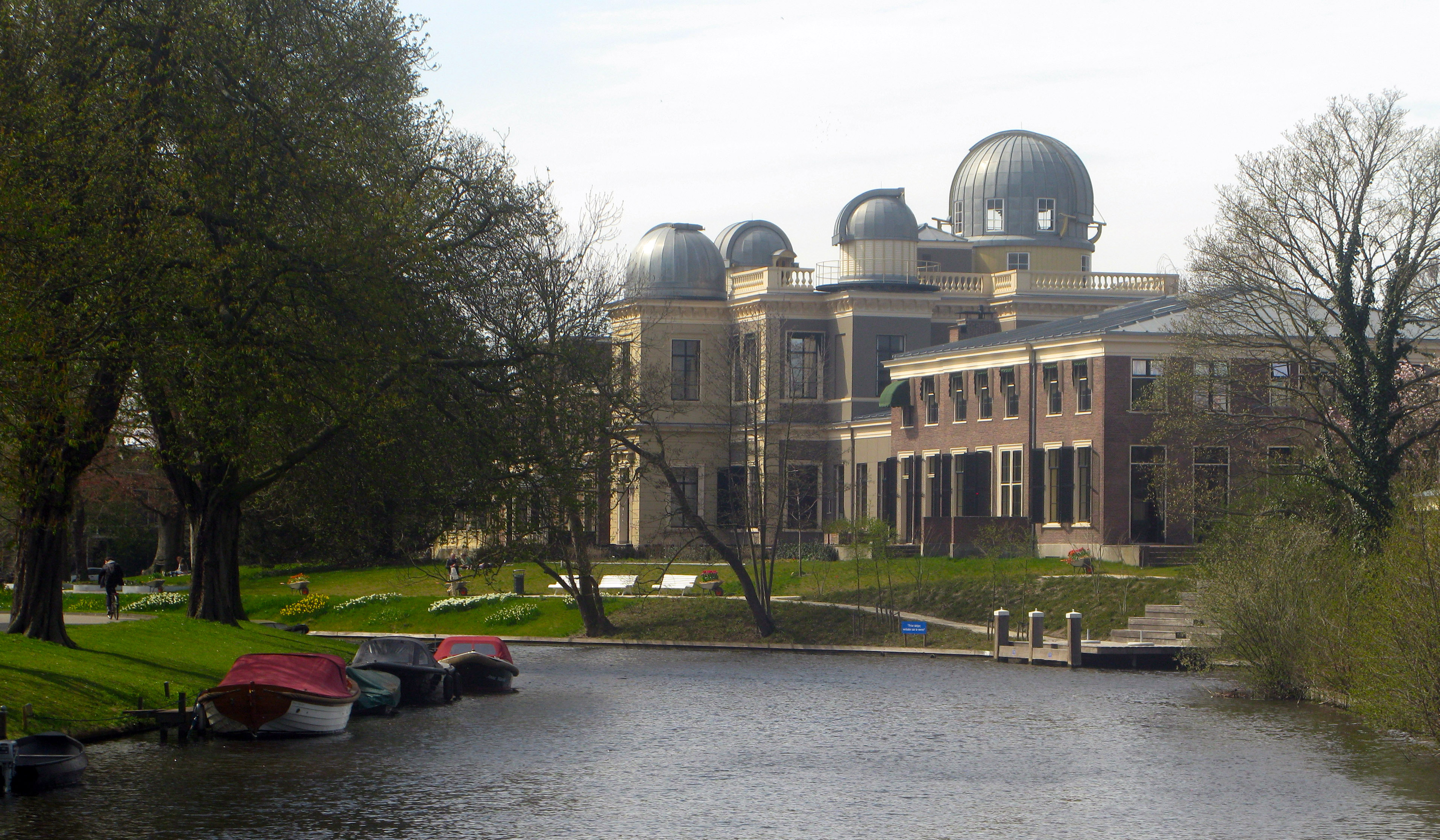
2013, after restoration.

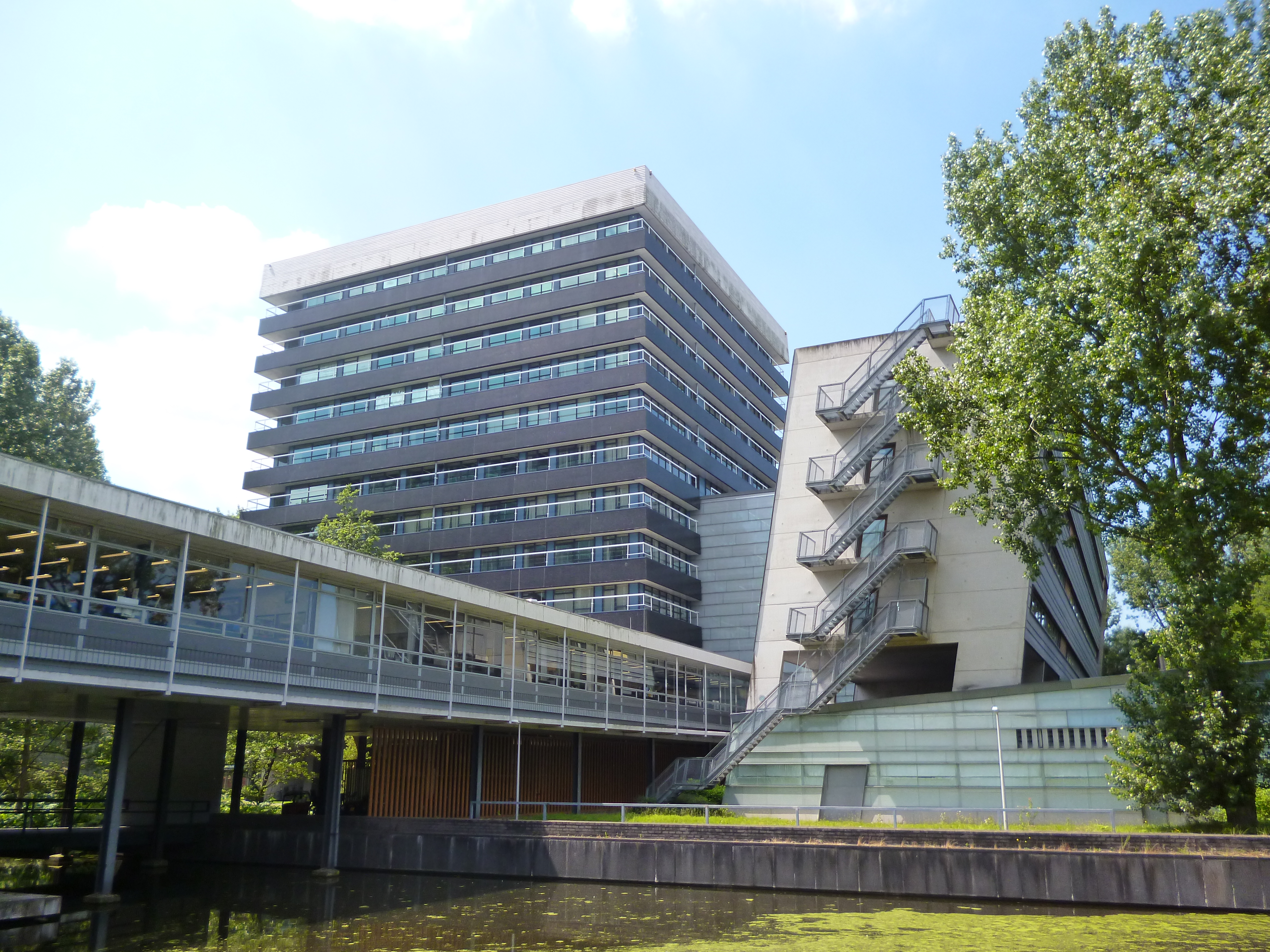
The Huygens Laboratory (left) and J.H. Oort Building (right) which currently house Leiden Observatory on the 4th, 5th and 11th floors.

== Directors ==
Term	Director
1633–1667	Jacobus Golius
1668–1681	Christiaan Melder
1682–1705	Burchardus de Volder
1705–1708	Lotharius Zumbach de Coesfeld
1717–1742	Willem Jacob Gravesande
1742–1768	Johan Lulofs
1768–1793	Dionysius van de Wijnpersse
1793–1794	Pieter Nieuwland
1799–1805	Jan Frederik van Beeck Calkoen
1811–1826	Cornelus Ekama
1826–1837	Pieter Uijlenbroek
1837–1872	Frederik Kaiser
1872–1908	H. G. van de Sande Bakhuyzen
1908–1918	E. F. van de Sande Bakhuyzen
1918–1934	Willem de Sitter
1934–1945	Ejnar Hertzsprung
1945–1970	Jan Oort
1996–2003	George K. Miley
2004–2012	Tim de Zeeuw
2012–2022	Huub Röttgering
2022–present	Ignas Snellen

== Instruments ==
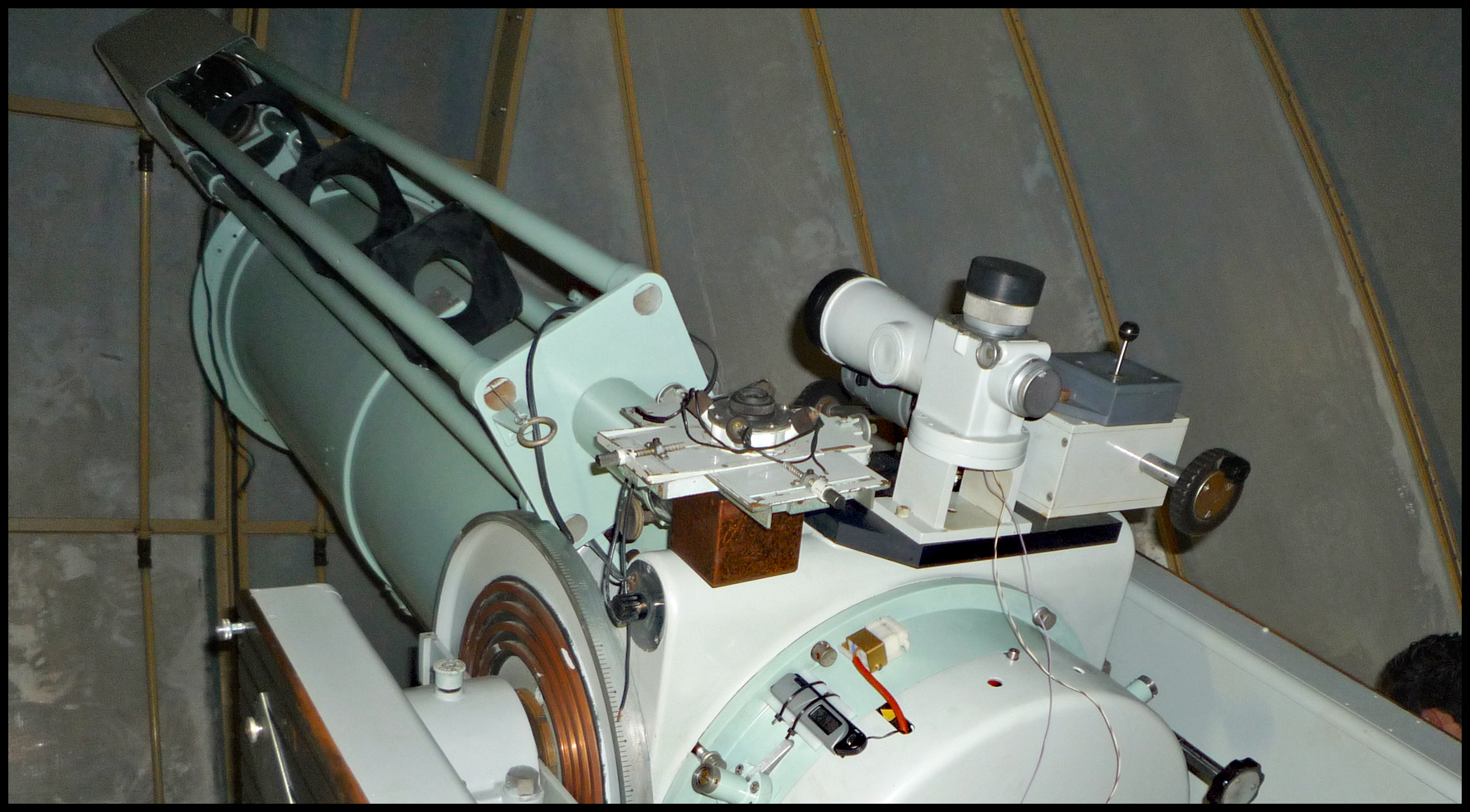
The Zunderman reflector

Examples:

- Zes-Duims Merz Refractor (16.6 cm/6.5 inch objective with wooden telescope tube dating to 1830s)
- Ten-inch Repsold Refractor (26.6 cm/10.5 inch Alvin and Clark objective lens on Repsold und Söhne, since 1885)
- Photographic Double Refractor (since 1897)
- Zunderman Reflector (46 cm diameter mirror (~18.1 inches), since 1947)
- Heliostat

== See also ==
- Timeline of telescopes, observatories, and observing technology
- List of largest optical telescopes in the 19th century
