= 1712 Angola =

Asteroid

Discovery
- Discovered by: C. Jackson
- Discovery site: Johannesburg Obs.
- Discovery date: 28 May 1935

Designations
- Named after: Angola (country)
- Alternative designations: 1935 KC · 1929 GC; 1935 ML · 1946 JB; 1953 SD · 1963 MD
- Minor planet category: main-belt · (outer)

Orbital characteristics
- Epoch 4 September 2017 (JD 2458000.5)
- Uncertainty parameter 0
- Observation arc: 87.94 yr (32,121 days)
- Aphelion: 3.6492 AU
- Perihelion: 2.6832 AU
- Semi-major axis: 3.1662 AU
- Eccentricity: 0.1525
- Orbital period (sidereal): 5.63 yr (2,058 days)
- Mean anomaly: 190.35°
- Mean motion: 0° 10^{m} 29.64^{s} / day
- Inclination: 19.393°
- Longitude of ascending node: 237.61°
- Argument of perihelion: 18.217°

Physical characteristics
- Dimensions: 59.31 km (derived); 59.48±2.3 km 64.904±1.218 km 66.892±0.298; 70.07±1.03 km 74.47±0.68 km
- Synodic rotation period: 11.527 h 11.5274±0.0007 h 11.53 h
- Geometric albedo: 0.029±0.003; 0.043±0.002; 0.0458 (derived); 0.0504±0.0126; 0.0600±0.005
- Spectral type: P · C
- Absolute magnitude (H): 9.8 · 10.1 · 10.15±0.24

1712 Angola, provisional designation 1935 KC, is a dark asteroid from the outer regions of the asteroid belt, approximately 66 kilometers in diameter. It was discovered on 28 May 1935, by English-born South African astronomer Cyril Jackson at Johannesburg Observatory in South Africa. It is named after the Republic of Angola.

== Orbit ==
Angola orbits the Sun in the outer main-belt at a distance of 2.7–3.6 AU once every 5 years and 8 months (2,058 days). Its orbit has an eccentricity of 0.15 and an inclination of 19° with respect to the ecliptic. Angola was first identified as 1929 GC at Johannesburg in 1929, extending the body's observation arc by 6 years prior to its official discovery observation.

== Lightcurve ==
In July 2003, French amateur astronomer René Roy obtained a rotational lightcurve of Angola. It gave a well-defined rotation period of 11.5274 hours with a brightness variation of 0.38 magnitude (U=3). Photometric observations by ESO's CCD-specialist Cyril Cavadore gave an identical period of 11.53 hours with an insufficient amplitude of 0.02 magnitude (U=1).

== Spectra, diameter and albedo ==
According to the surveys carried out by the Infrared Astronomical Satellite IRAS, the Japanese Akari satellite, and NASA's Wide-field Infrared Survey Explorer (WISE) with its subsequent NEOWISE mission, Angola measures between 59.48 and 70.07 kilometers in diameter and its surface has an albedo between 0.029 and 0.060. The Collaborative Asteroid Lightcurve Link derives an albedo of 0.0458 and a diameter of 59.31 kilometers based on an absolute magnitude of 10.1. The carbonaceous C-type asteroid is also classified a dark P type by WISE.

== Naming ==
This minor planet is named for Angola, the state on the southwestern coast of Africa. The approved naming citation was published by the Minor Planet Center on 1 February 1980 (M.P.C. 5183).
