= 1323 Tugela =

Dark background asteroid

Discovery
- Discovered by: C. Jackson
- Discovery site: Johannesburg Obs.
- Discovery date: 19 May 1934

Designations
- Named after: Tugela River (South African river)
- Alternative designations: 1934 LD · 1974 HR_{3} 1974 KM · 1974 KO; A908 UB · A911 HC
- Minor planet category: main-belt · (outer) background

Orbital characteristics
- Epoch 4 September 2017 (JD 2458000.5)
- Uncertainty parameter 0
- Observation arc: 109.02 yr (39,818 days)
- Aphelion: 3.7100 AU
- Perihelion: 2.7510 AU
- Semi-major axis: 3.2305 AU
- Eccentricity: 0.1484
- Orbital period (sidereal): 5.81 yr (2,121 days)
- Mean anomaly: 234.50°
- Mean motion: 0° 10^{m} 10.92^{s} / day
- Inclination: 18.787°
- Longitude of ascending node: 45.241°
- Argument of perihelion: 136.10°

Physical characteristics
- Dimensions: 58.44±3.4 km 58.50 km (derived); 62.00±19.32 km 63.45±0.94 km 67.76±25.28 km 78.295±0.511 km 90.557±0.542 km 110.11±1.73 km
- Synodic rotation period: 19.50±0.02 h (Note: Lightcurve plot of 1323 Tugela, Palmer Divide Observatory, B. D. Warner (2007). Summary figures at the LCDB); 19.777±0.0365 h
- Geometric albedo: 0.018±0.004; 0.0236±0.0044; 0.04±0.02; 0.04±0.03; 0.048±0.002; 0.0567±0.007; 0.0620 (derived)
- Spectral type: SMASS = Xc; P · C (assumed)
- Absolute magnitude (H): 9.56±0.62 · 9.80 · 9.84 · 9.90 · 10.245±0.001 (S)

1323 Tugela, provisional designation 1934 LD, is a dark background asteroid from the outer regions of the asteroid belt, approximately 60 kilometers in diameter. It was discovered on 19 May 1934, by South African astronomer Cyril Jackson at the Union Observatory in Johannesburg. The asteroid was named for the Tugela River in western South Africa.

== Orbit and classification ==
Tugela is a non-family asteroid from the main belt's background population. It orbits the Sun in the outer main-belt at a distance of 2.8–3.7 AU once every 5 years and 10 months (2,121 days; semi-major axis of 3.23 AU). Its orbit has an eccentricity of 0.15 and an inclination of 19° with respect to the ecliptic.

The body's observation arc begins with its first identification as A908 UB at Heidelberg Observatory in October 1908, almost 26 years prior to its official discovery observation at Johannesburg.

== Physical characteristics ==
In the SMASS classification, Tugela is an Xc-subtype that transitions from the X-type to the carbonaceous C-type asteroids. The Wide-field Infrared Survey Explorer (WISE) characterized it as a primitive P-type asteroid, while the Collaborative Asteroid Lightcurve Link (CALL) assumes it to be a C-type.

=== Rotation period ===
Observations performed by American astronomer Brian Warner at the Palmer Divide Observatory in Colorado Springs, Colorado, during February 2007 produced a lightcurve with a period of 19.50 ± 0.02 hours and an amplitude of 0.25 ± 0.02 in magnitude (U=3). In September 2011, photometry in the S-band at the Palomar Transient Factory gave a similar period of 19.777 hours with a brightness variation of 0.18 magnitude (U=2).

=== Diameter and albedo ===
According to the surveys carried out by the Infrared Astronomical Satellite IRAS, the Japanese Akari satellite and the NEOWISE mission of NASA's WISE telescope, Tugela measures between 58.44 and 110.11 kilometers in diameter and its surface has an albedo between 0.018 and 0.0567.

CALL largely agrees with IRAS and derives an albedo of 0.0620 with a diameter of 58.50 kilometers based on an absolute magnitude of 9.8.

== Naming ==
This minor planet was named after the Tugela River, the largest river in the KwaZulu-Natal Province of western South Africa. The official naming citation was mentioned in The Names of the Minor Planets by Paul Herget in 1955 (H 121).
