= 1244 Deira =

Main-belt asteroid

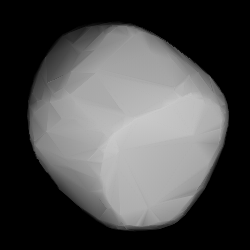
- Modelled shape of Deira from its lightcurve

Discovery
- Discovered by: C. Jackson
- Discovery site: Johannesburg Obs.
- Discovery date: 25 May 1932

Designations
- Pronunciation: /ˈdaɪrə/ DY-rə or /ˈdɛərə/ DAIR-ə
- Named after: Deira, near the town of Ossett, England (alt. Celtic Kingdom of Deira)
- Alternative designations: 1932 KE · 1930 YR; 1984 YQ_{6} · A908 TD; A921 GC · A924 BH
- Minor planet category: main-belt · (inner); background

Orbital characteristics
- Epoch 4 September 2017 (JD 2458000.5)
- Uncertainty parameter 0
- Observation arc: 109.13 yr (39,861 days)
- Aphelion: 2.5731 AU
- Perihelion: 2.1129 AU
- Semi-major axis: 2.3430 AU
- Eccentricity: 0.0982
- Orbital period (sidereal): 3.59 yr (1,310 days)
- Mean anomaly: 335.23°
- Mean motion: 0° 16^{m} 29.28^{s} / day
- Inclination: 8.6950°
- Longitude of ascending node: 277.12°
- Argument of perihelion: 261.45°

Physical characteristics
- Mean diameter: 28.816±0.546 km 30.432±9.136 km 30.95±1.9 km 31.799±0.487 km 32.28±0.35 km 33.15±7.01 km 35.19±0.19 km
- Synodic rotation period: 5 (poor) h 210.6±0.1 h (Note: Oey (2011) LCDB. (1244) Deira – rotation period 210.6±0.1 hours with a brightness amplitude of 0.50±0.03 mag. Quality code of 2. Summary figures at the LCDB.); 216.98±0.05 h 217.1±0.1 h (Note: Oey (2007) website. (1244) Deira – rotation period 217.1±0.1 hours with a brightness amplitude of 0.60±0.05 mag. No quality code. Lightcurve-plot and summary figures at the archived Leura Observatory website. Astronomers comment: "The data is re-reduced with Canopus 9.5 Comp Star Selector feature. Linkage over the 2.5 months period showing a main period of 217h. Slow rotator with deviation from the mean due to Psyn-sid and tumbling characteristics.")
- Pole ecliptic latitude: (314.0°, −46.0°) (λ_{1}/β_{1}); (107.0°, −56.0°) (λ_{2}/β_{2})
- Geometric albedo: 0.03±0.00; 0.0357±0.0051; 0.037±0.011; 0.0416±0.0312; 0.052±0.001; 0.0557±0.007
- Spectral type: X (S3OS2); P (WISE)
- Absolute magnitude (H): 11.30; 11.50

1244 Deira (prov. designation: 1932 KE) is a dark background asteroid and slow rotator from the inner region of the asteroid belt. The X-type asteroid has an exceptionally long rotation period of 210.6 hours and measures approximately 31 kilometers (19 miles) in diameter. It was discovered on 25 May 1932, by English-born South African astronomer Cyril Jackson at the Union Observatory in Johannesburg, who named it after Deira, an old kingdom near his birthplace, the market town of Ossett, located in West Yorkshire, England.

== Orbit and classification ==
Deira is a non-family asteroid of the main belt's background population when applying the hierarchical clustering method to its proper orbital elements. It orbits the Sun in the inner asteroid belt at a distance of 2.1–2.6 AU once every 3 years and 7 months (1,310 days; semi-major axis 2.34 AU). Its orbit has an eccentricity of 0.10 and an inclination of 9° with respect to the ecliptic. The body's observation arc begins with its first observations as A908 TD at Heidelberg Observatory in October 1908, or more than 23 years prior to its official discovery observation at Johannesburg.

== Naming ==
This minor planet was named by the discoverer Cyril Jackson after his birthplace, the market town of Ossett, located in West Yorkshire, England (also see 2193 Jackson). The official naming citation was mentioned in The Names of the Minor Planets by Paul Herget in 1955 (H 115). While the naming citation reads that Deira is the ancient name for his birthplace, the Celtic Kingdom of Deira was actually much larger, encompassing at its height most of Yorkshire in Northern England.

== Physical characteristics ==
Deira has been characterized as a primitive P-type asteroid by the space-based Wide-field Infrared Survey Explorer (WISE). While P-type bodies are common in the outermost asteroid belt and among the Jupiter trojans, they are rarely found in the inner main belt. In both the Tholen- and SMASS-like taxonomy of the Small Solar System Objects Spectroscopic Survey (S3OS2), Deira is an X-type asteroid.

=== Rotation period ===
In March 2011, a rotational lightcurve of Deira was obtained from photometric observations by Julian Oey at his Leura Observatory (E17) in Australia. Lightcurve analysis gave a rotation period of 210.6 hours with a brightness variation of 0.5 magnitude (U=2), while Oey previously published a slightly longer period of 217.1 hours and an amplitude of 0.6 magnitude (U=n.a.). This makes Deira one of the Top 300 slow rotators known to exist.

=== Spin axis ===
In 2016, an international study modeled a lightcurve with a concurring period of 216.98 hours and found two spin axis of (314.0°, −46.0°) and (107.0°, −56.0°) in ecliptic coordinates (λ, β).

=== Diameter and albedo ===
According to the surveys carried out by the Infrared Astronomical Satellite IRAS, the Japanese Akari satellite and the NEOWISE mission of NASA's WISE telescope, Deira measures between 28.816 and 35.19 kilometers in diameter and its surface has an albedo between 0.03 and 0.0557.

The Collaborative Asteroid Lightcurve Link derives an albedo of 0.0465 and a diameter of 30.89 kilometers based on an absolute magnitude of 11.5.
