= 1282 Utopia =

Main-belt asteroid

Discovery
- Discovered by: C. Jackson
- Discovery site: Johannesburg Obs.
- Discovery date: 17 August 1933

Designations
- Pronunciation: /juːˈtoʊpiə/
- Named after: Utopia (fictional island society)
- Alternative designations: 1933 QM_{1} · 1930 CA; 1933 QB_{1} · 1933 RF; 1939 RB · 1955 SO_{1}
- Minor planet category: main-belt · (outer) background

Orbital characteristics
- Epoch 4 September 2017 (JD 2458000.5)
- Uncertainty parameter 0
- Observation arc: 84.09 yr (30,715 days)
- Aphelion: 3.5049 AU
- Perihelion: 2.7293 AU
- Semi-major axis: 3.1171 AU
- Eccentricity: 0.1244
- Orbital period (sidereal): 5.50 yr (2,010 days)
- Mean anomaly: 23.825°
- Mean motion: 0° 10^{m} 44.76^{s} / day
- Inclination: 18.040°
- Longitude of ascending node: 324.31°
- Argument of perihelion: 79.265°

Physical characteristics
- Dimensions: 52.91 km (derived); 53.07±3.7 km 54.48±19.56 km 57.702±0.300 km 58.77±0.72 km 64.414±0.843 km 64.71±0.58 km
- Synodic rotation period: 13.60±0.05 h 13.61±0.01 h 13.6228±0.0005 h 13.623±0.002 h
- Geometric albedo: 0.035±0.008; 0.04±0.05; 0.0426±0.0086; 0.0479 (derived); 0.052±0.002; 0.053±0.007; 0.0627±0.010
- Spectral type: P · C (assumed)
- Absolute magnitude (H): 10.00 · 10.20 · 10.27 · 10.3

1282 Utopia (symbol:) /juːˈtoʊpiə/ is a dark asteroid from the outer regions of the asteroid belt, approximately 55 kilometers in diameter. It was discovered on 17 August 1933, by South African astronomer Cyril Jackson at the Union Observatory in Johannesburg, and given the provisional designation 1933 QM_{1}. The asteroid was named after the fictional island of Utopia.

== Orbit and classification ==
Utopia is a non-family asteroid from the main belt's background population. It orbits the Sun in the outer asteroid belt at a distance of 2.7–3.5 AU once every 5 years and 6 months (2,010 days). Its orbit has an eccentricity of 0.12 and an inclination of 18° with respect to the ecliptic.

The asteroid was first identified as 1930 CA at Simeiz Observatory in February 1930. The body's observation arc begins at the Johannesburg Observatory in September 1933, about three weeks after its official discovery observation.

== Physical characteristics ==
Utopia has been characterized as a dark and primitive P-type asteroid by the Wide-field Infrared Survey Explorer. It is also an assumed carbonaceous C-type asteroid.

=== Rotation period and pole ===
In November 2000, photometric observations by Brian Warner at the Palmer Divide Observatory (716) in Colorado Springs, Colorado, were used to build a lightcurve for Utopia. The asteroid displayed a rotation period of 13.61 hours and a brightness variation of 0.28 magnitude, revised from a previous publication that gave 13.60 hours and an amplitude of 0.29 (U=3/3). (Note: Lightcurve plot of 1282 Utopia, Palmer Divide Observatory, Brian D. Warner (2000): rotation period 13.61±0.01 hours with a brightness amplitude of 0.28±0.01 mag. Summary figures at the LCDB.) In September 2005, French amateur astronomers Laurent Bernasconi, Raymond Poncy and Pierre Antonini obtained a lightcurve with a concurring period of 13.623 hours and an amplitude of 0.36 magnitude (U=3).

In 2011, a modeled lightcurve using data from the Uppsala Asteroid Photometric Catalogue (UAPC) and other sources gave a sidereal period 13.6228 hours, as well as a fragmentary spin axis of (n.a., -39.0°) in ecliptic coordinates (λ, β).

=== Diameter and albedo ===
According to the surveys carried out by the Infrared Astronomical Satellite IRAS, the Japanese Akari satellite and the NEOWISE mission of NASA's WISE telescope, Utopia measures between 53.07 and 64.71 kilometers in diameter and its surface has an albedo between 0.035 and 0.0627.

The Collaborative Asteroid Lightcurve Link derives an albedo of 0.0479 and a diameter of 52.91 kilometers based on an absolute magnitude of 10.3.

== Naming ==
This minor planet was named after Utopia, the imaginary place that possesses highly desirable or nearly perfect qualities for its citizens, especially in laws, government, and social conditions. The term "utopia" was coined from Greek by English statesman and author Sir Thomas More (1478–1535) for his 16th-century book Utopia, describing a fictional island society in the south Atlantic Ocean off the coast of South America. The official naming citation was mentioned in The Names of the Minor Planets by Paul Herget in 1955 (H 117).
