= 1428 Mombasa =

Main-belt asteroid

Discovery
- Discovered by: C. Jackson
- Discovery site: Johannesburg Obs.
- Discovery date: 5 July 1937

Designations
- Named after: Mombasa (city, port)
- Alternative designations: 1937 NO · 1933 WO; 1949 FA · 1957 YZ
- Minor planet category: main-belt · (middle)

Orbital characteristics
- Epoch 16 February 2017 (JD 2457800.5)
- Uncertainty parameter 0
- Observation arc: 82.74 yr (30,219 days)
- Aphelion: 3.2039 AU
- Perihelion: 2.4154 AU
- Semi-major axis: 2.8096 AU
- Eccentricity: 0.1403
- Orbital period (sidereal): 4.71 yr (1,720 days)
- Mean anomaly: 263.81°
- Mean motion: 0° 12^{m} 33.48^{s} / day
- Inclination: 17.305°
- Longitude of ascending node: 115.72°
- Argument of perihelion: 252.61°

Physical characteristics
- Dimensions: 52.464±0.268 km 53.35±13.28 km 55.34±0.70 km 56.63±2.0 km 56.83 km (derived); 57.59±19.41 km 62.45±0.73 km 127.203±29.18 km
- Synodic rotation period: 16.67±0.01 h (Note: Stephens (2012) web: rotation period 16.67±0.01 hours with a brightness amplitude of 0.16 mag. Notes: "A half-period of 8.38 h cannot be formally excluded". Summary figures at Collaborative Asteroid Lightcurve Link (CALL) for (1428) Mombasa); 17.12±0.01 h 17.6±0.2 h
- Geometric albedo: 0.0010±0.0099; 0.0240±0.002; 0.025±0.001; 0.038±0.004; 0.04±0.04; 0.0415 (derived); 0.06±0.06
- Spectral type: SMASS = Xc · P · C
- Absolute magnitude (H): 9.95±0.74 · 10.20 · 10.27 · 10.3 · 10.9

1428 Mombasa, provisional designation 1937 NO, is a dark asteroid from the middle region of the asteroid belt, approximately 56 kilometers in diameter.

It was discovered on 5 July 1937, by English-born South African astronomer Cyril Jackson at Johannesburg Observatory, South Africa, and later named after Mombasa, Kenya.

== Orbit and classification ==
Mombasa orbits the Sun at a distance of 2.4–3.2 AU once every 4 years and 9 months (1,720 days). Its orbit has an eccentricity of 0.14 and an inclination of 17° with respect to the ecliptic. Mombasa was first identified as 1933 WO at Lowell Observatory, extending the body's observation arc by 4 years prior to its official discovery at Johannesburg.

== Physical characteristics ==
=== Rotation period ===
American astronomer Robert Stephens obtained a rotational lightcurve of Mombasa in June 2012. Light-curve analysis gave a rotation period of 16.67 hours with a brightness variation of 0.16 magnitude (U=2+). Previous lightcurves were obtained by French amateur astronomer René Roy in February 2006 (17.6 hours, Δ0.15 mag; U=2), as well as by Scot Hawkins and Richard Ditteon at Oakley Observatory in May 2007 (17.12 hours, Δ0.25 mag; U=2).

=== Spectral type, diameter and albedo ===
On the SMASS taxonomic scheme, Mombasa is a Xc-type, an intermediate between the carbonaceous C and X-type, while it is also described as a darker P-type asteroid. According to the surveys carried out by the Infrared Astronomical Satellite IRAS, the Japanese Akari satellite, and NASA's Wide-field Infrared Survey Explorer with its subsequent NEOWISE mission, Mombasa measures between 52.46 and 62.45 kilometers in diameter, ignoring a preliminary result of 127 km, and its surface has an albedo of 0.025 and 0.06. The Collaborative Asteroid Lightcurve Link derives an albedo of 0.0415 and a diameter of 56.83 kilometers with an absolute magnitude of 10.3.

== Naming ==
This minor planet was named after Mombasa, chief-port and second largest city of Kenya on the coast of East Africa. The official naming citation was published by the Minor Planet Center in April 1953 (M.P.C. 909).
