= 1319 Disa =

Main-belt asteroid

Discovery
- Discovered by: C. Jackson
- Discovery site: Johannesburg Obs.
- Discovery date: 19 March 1934

Designations
- Pronunciation: /ˈdaɪsə/
- Named after: Disa (orchid – flowering plant)
- Alternative designations: 1934 FO · 1929 GE; 1970 FM · A908 EA
- Minor planet category: main-belt · (outer)

Orbital characteristics
- Epoch 4 September 2017 (JD 2458000.5)
- Uncertainty parameter 0
- Observation arc: 109.20 yr (39,885 days)
- Aphelion: 3.6026 AU
- Perihelion: 2.3684 AU
- Semi-major axis: 2.9855 AU
- Eccentricity: 0.2067
- Orbital period (sidereal): 5.16 yr (1,884 days)
- Mean anomaly: 41.069°
- Mean motion: 0° 11^{m} 27.96^{s} / day
- Inclination: 2.8007°
- Longitude of ascending node: 256.10°
- Argument of perihelion: 316.25°

Physical characteristics
- Dimensions: 16.88±1.12 km 24.00±0.37 km 25.651±0.321 km 25.894±0.180 km 40.33 km (calculated)
- Synodic rotation period: 7.080±0.003 h (Note: Lightcurve plot of 1319 Disa, Palmer Divide Observatory, Brian D. Warner (2006)); 7.082±0.001 h 7.0820±0.0077 h
- Geometric albedo: 0.057 (assumed); 0.0959±0.0034; 0.097±0.012; 0.116±0.004; 0.391±0.038
- Spectral type: P · C
- Absolute magnitude (H): 10.391±0.002 (R) · 10.50 · 10.7 · 11.1

1319 Disa, provisional designation 1934 FO, is a carbonaceous asteroid from the outer region of the asteroid belt, approximately 25 kilometers in diameter. It was discovered on 19 March 1934, by English-born, South African astronomer Cyril Jackson at Johannesburg Observatory in South Africa. It is named for the orchid Disa.

== Orbit ==
Disa orbits the Sun in the outer main-belt at a distance of 2.4–3.6 AU once every 5 years and 2 months (1,884 days). Its orbit has an eccentricity of 0.21 and an inclination of 3° with respect to the ecliptic. It was first identified as A908 EA at Heidelberg Observatory in 1908. The body's observation arc begins in 1929, when it was identified as 1929 GE at the discovering observatory, 6 years prior to its official discovery observation.

== Physical characteristics ==
=== Rotation period ===
A rotational lightcurve of Disa was obtained by American astronomer Brian D. Warner at his Palmer Divide Observatory in March 2006, and by French amateur astronomer Pierre Antonini in February 2011, respectively. Analysis of both lightcurves gave a well-defined rotation period of 7.08 hours with a brightness variation of 0.26 and 0.27 magnitude (U=3/3).

In September 2013, photometric observations in the R-band at the Palomar Transient Factory gave a concurring lightcurve of 7.082 hours and an amplitude of 0.24 magnitude (U=2).

=== Diameter, albedo and spectral type ===
According to the surveys carried out by the Japanese Akari satellite, and the 2014-results by NASA's Wide-field Infrared Survey Explorer with its subsequent NEOWISE mission, Disa measures 24.00 and 25.65 kilometers in diameter, and its surface has an albedo of 0.116 and 0.097, respectively.

The Collaborative Asteroid Lightcurve Link assumes a standard albedo for carbonaceous C-type asteroids of 0.057 and calculates a diameter of 40.33 kilometers with an absolute magnitude of 10.7. Preliminary results by NEOWISE also characterized the body as a dark and reddish P-type asteroid.

== Naming ==
This minor planet was named after Disa, also known as "African weed-orchid", a large genus of more than a hundred tropical orchids, common in southern Africa. In 1955, this naming citation was also published by Paul Herget in The Names of the Minor Planets (H 120).
