= 1268 Libya =

Hildian asteroid

Discovery
- Discovered by: C. Jackson
- Discovery site: Johannesburg Obs.
- Discovery date: 29 April 1930

Designations
- Named after: Libya (country)
- Alternative designations: 1930 HJ · 1929 EA; 1930 KN
- Minor planet category: main-belt · (outer); Hilda

Orbital characteristics
- Epoch 4 September 2017 (JD 2458000.5)
- Uncertainty parameter 0
- Observation arc: 87.09 yr (31,811 days)
- Aphelion: 4.3787 AU
- Perihelion: 3.5686 AU
- Semi-major axis: 3.9737 AU
- Eccentricity: 0.1019
- Orbital period (sidereal): 7.92 yr (2,893 days)
- Mean anomaly: 157.54°
- Mean motion: 0° 7^{m} 27.84^{s} / day
- Inclination: 4.4272°
- Longitude of ascending node: 351.00°
- Argument of perihelion: 119.43°
- Jupiter MOID: 0.7451 AU

Physical characteristics
- Dimensions: 93.44±1.42 km 94.10±2.3 km 96.708±0.848 km
- Synodic rotation period: 14.05 h 14.05008 h
- Geometric albedo: 0.043±0.003; 0.0449±0.002; 0.046±0.002
- Spectral type: Tholen = P B–V = 0.663; U–B = 0.228
- Absolute magnitude (H): 9.12 · 9.19±0.33

1268 Libya, provisional designation 1930 HJ, is a dark Hildian asteroid from the outer regions of the asteroid belt, approximately 95 kilometers in diameter. It was discovered on 29 April 1930, by South African astronomer Cyril Jackson at the Union Observatory in Johannesburg, South Africa. The asteroid was named for the country Libya.

== Orbit and classification ==
Libya belongs to the dynamical Hilda group of asteroids, which reside in, or closely inside the 3:2 orbital resonance with the giant planet Jupiter at 4.0 AU. However, the asteroid belongs to the background population as it is not a member of any known asteroid family within the Hildian dynamical group.

Libya orbits the Sun in the outer main-belt at a distance of 3.6–4.4 AU once every 7 years and 11 months (2,893 days). Its orbit has an eccentricity of 0.10 and an inclination of 4° with respect to the ecliptic. The asteroid was first identified as 1929 EA at Uccle Observatory in March 1929, and its observation arc begins with its official discovery observation at Johannesburg in 1930.

== Physical characteristics ==
In the Tholen classification, Libya is a primitive P-type asteroid.

=== Rotation period ===
In June 1994, a rotational lightcurve of Libya was obtained from photometric observations by Swedish astronomer Mats Dahlgren (see 6945) at ESO's La Silla Observatory using the Dutch 0.9-metre Telescope. Lightcurve analysis gave a well-defined rotation period of 14.05 hours with a brightness variation of 0.08 magnitude (U=3). In October 2011, observations by French amateur astronomer René Roy also gave a period of 14.05 hours and a low amplitude of 0.06 magnitude (U=n.a.). A low brightness amplitude typically indicates that the body has a spheroidal rather than an elongated or irregular shape.

=== Diameter and albedo ===
According to the surveys carried out by the Infrared Astronomical Satellite IRAS, the Japanese Akari satellite and the NEOWISE mission of NASA's Wide-field Infrared Survey Explorer, Libya measures between 93.44 and 96.708 kilometers in diameter and its surface has an albedo between 0.043 and 0.046.

The Collaborative Asteroid Lightcurve Link adopts the results obtained by IRAS, that is, an albedo of 0.0449 and a diameter of 94.10 kilometers based on an absolute magnitude of 9.12.

Between 2018 and 2021, 1268 Libya has been observed to occult three stars.

== Naming ==
This minor planet was named after the North African country of Libya, bordering the Mediterranean Sea. The official naming citation was mentioned in The Names of the Minor Planets by Paul Herget in 1955 (H 116).
