= 1356 Nyanza =

Dark asteroid from the background population of the outer asteroid belt

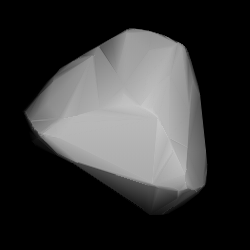
- Modelled shape of Nyanza from its lightcurve

Discovery
- Discovered by: C. Jackson
- Discovery site: Johannesburg Obs.
- Discovery date: 3 May 1935

Designations
- Named after: Nyanza Province (former province of Kenya)
- Alternative designations: 1935 JH · 1929 EL; 1929 JH · 1929 JJ; 1931 TB_{3}
- Minor planet category: main-belt · (outer) background

Orbital characteristics
- Epoch 4 September 2017 (JD 2458000.5)
- Uncertainty parameter 0
- Observation arc: 86.06 yr (31,435 days)
- Aphelion: 3.2359 AU
- Perihelion: 2.9288 AU
- Semi-major axis: 3.0823 AU
- Eccentricity: 0.0498
- Orbital period (sidereal): 5.41 yr (1,977 days)
- Mean anomaly: 307.99°
- Mean motion: 0° 10^{m} 55.56^{s} / day
- Inclination: 7.9461°
- Longitude of ascending node: 69.627°
- Argument of perihelion: 302.27°

Physical characteristics
- Dimensions: 60.078±0.289 km 60.895±0.757 km 61.05±20.58 km 62.46±0.89 km 64.59 km (derived); 64.73±5.1 km
- Synodic rotation period: 12.422±0.006 h
- Geometric albedo: 0.0352 (derived); 0.04±0.02; 0.0462±0.008; 0.050±0.002; 0.052±0.007; 0.0537±0.0090
- Spectral type: P · C (assumed)
- Absolute magnitude (H): 9.90 · 10.20

1356 Nyanza, provisional designation 1935 JH, is a dark asteroid from the background population of the outer asteroid belt, approximately 63 kilometers in diameter. It was discovered on 3 May 1935, by South-African astronomer Cyril Jackson at the Union Observatory in Johannesburg. The asteroid was named for the former Nyanza Province in Kenya, Africa.

== Orbit and classification ==
Nyanza is a non-family asteroid of the main belt's background population. It orbits the Sun in the outer asteroid belt at a distance of 2.9–3.2 AU once every 5 years and 5 months (1,977 days; semi-major axis of 3.08 AU). Its orbit has an eccentricity of 0.05 and an inclination of 8° with respect to the ecliptic.

The asteroid was first identified as 1929 EL at Heidelberg Observatory and as 1929 JH and 1929 JJ at Lowell Observatory in March and May 1929, respectively. The body's observation arc begins at Lowell Observatory in October 1931, three and a half years prior to its official discovery observation at Johannesburg.

== Naming ==
This minor planet was named for the former Nyanza Province located in southwestern Kenya, bordering on Lake Victoria. Its provincial capital was Kisumu. In 2010, Kenya's 8 provinces were reorganized into 47 counties. The official naming citation was mentioned in The Names of the Minor Planets by Paul Herget in 1955 (H 123).

== Physical characteristics ==
Nyanza has been characterized as a primitive P-type asteroid by the Wide-field Infrared Survey Explorer (WISE). It is also an assumed carbonaceous C-type.

=== Rotation period ===
In May 2005, a rotational lightcurve of Nyanza was obtained from photometric observations by French amateur astronomer Pierre Antonini. Lightcurve analysis gave a well-defined rotation period of 12.422 hours with a brightness amplitude of 0.28 magnitude (U=3).

=== Diameter and albedo ===
According to the surveys carried out by the Infrared Astronomical Satellite IRAS, the Japanese Akari satellite and the NEOWISE mission of NASA's WISE telescope, Nyanza measures between 60.078 and 64.73 kilometers in diameter and its surface has an albedo between 0.04 and 0.0537.

The Collaborative Asteroid Lightcurve Link derives an albedo of 0.0352 and a diameter of 64.59 kilometers based on an absolute magnitude of 10.2.
