= List of named minor planets: X =

This is a partial list of named minor planets, containing all those starting with the letter X, as of 17 August 2026. It is ordered in a case-insensitive, alphabetical manner and contains a total of 61 entries. Grey minor planets have no article and redirect to the list of minor planets instead (see List of minor planets § Main index).

== X ==
- 15171 Xandertielens
- 411 Xanthe
- 156 Xanthippe
- 7394 Xanthomalitia
- 4544 Xanthus
- 145593 Xántus
- 29220 Xavierbaptista
- 327943 Xavierbarcons
- 625 Xenia
- 14526 Xenocrates
- 6026 Xenophanes
- 5986 Xenophon
- 7211 Xerxes
- 78799 Xewioso
- 2387 Xi'an
- 25146 Xiada
- 20779 Xiajunchao
- 16319 Xiamenerzhong
- 74092 Xiangda
- 3481 Xianglupeak
- 513340 Xianshiyou
- 9832 Xiaobinwang
- 24198 Xiaomengzeng
- 33684 Xiaomichael
- 27099 Xiaoyucao
- 15889 Xiaoyuhe
- 24190 Xiaoyunyin
- 529729 Xida
- 32928 Xiejialin
- 335968 Xiejin
- 204836 Xiexiaosi
- 703756 Xijiaouni
- 192515 Xinanjiaoda
- 22420 Xinanlida
- 456695 Xingdingyu
- 142020 Xinghaishiyan
- 19300 Xinglong
- 4730 Xingmingzhou
- 2336 Xinjiang
- 192450 Xinjiangdaxue
- 22563 Xinwang
- 28411 Xiuqicao
- 21313 Xiuyanyu
- 7494 Xiwanggongcheng
- 33973 Xiyunhou
- 2344 Xizang
- 85472 Xizezong
- 55082 Xlendi
- 1506 Xosa
- 55901 Xuaoao
- 25580 Xuelai
- 638624 Xueqikun
- 345871 Xuguangxian
- 826505 Xujianlin
- 15547 Xujiping
- 172989 Xuliyang
- 208663 Xuxiyuan
- 59425 Xuyangsheng
- 4360 Xuyi
- 90826 Xuzhihong
- 546843 Xuzhijian
back to top

== See also ==
- List of minor planet discoverers
- List of observatory codes
- Meanings of minor planet names § Index
