= 1354 Botha =

Exceptionally dark background asteroid

Discovery
- Discovered by: C. Jackson
- Discovery site: Johannesburg Obs.
- Discovery date: 3 April 1935

Designations
- Named after: Louis Botha (South African prime minister)
- Alternative designations: 1935 GK · 1925 RF; 1930 KG · 1931 TP; 1935 JK · 1953 TO_{1} 1953 TY_{2}
- Minor planet category: main-belt · (outer) background

Orbital characteristics
- Epoch 4 September 2017 (JD 2458000.5)
- Uncertainty parameter 0
- Observation arc: 85.55 yr (31,248 days)
- Aphelion: 3.8022 AU
- Perihelion: 2.4451 AU
- Semi-major axis: 3.1237 AU
- Eccentricity: 0.2172
- Orbital period (sidereal): 5.52 yr (2,017 days)
- Mean anomaly: 255.58°
- Mean motion: 0° 10^{m} 42.6^{s} / day
- Inclination: 5.9581°
- Longitude of ascending node: 28.715°
- Argument of perihelion: 250.45°

Physical characteristics
- Dimensions: 38.41±12.74 km 41.732±0.504 km 42.54±0.69 km 46.567±0.550 km 48.75±5.8 km 48.82 km (derived); 70.34±0.88 km
- Synodic rotation period: 4 h (poor)
- Geometric albedo: 0.014±0.003; 0.0225±0.006; 0.0246±0.0047; 0.0295 (derived); 0.030±0.001; 0.05±0.04
- Spectral type: C (assumed)
- Absolute magnitude (H): 11.00 · 11.03 · 11.20±0.35 · 11.30

1354 Botha, provisional designation 1935 GK, is an exceptionally dark background asteroid from the outer regions of the asteroid belt, approximately 46 kilometers in diameter. It was discovered on 3 April 1935, by South-African astronomer Cyril Jackson at the Union Observatory in Johannesburg. The asteroid was named after South African prime minister Louis Botha.

== Orbit and classification ==
Botha is a non-family asteroid of the main belt's background population. It orbits the Sun in the outer asteroid belt at a distance of 2.4–3.8 AU once every 5 years and 6 months (2,017 days; semi-major axis of 3.12 AU). Its orbit has an eccentricity of 0.22 and an inclination of 6° with respect to the ecliptic.

The asteroid was first identified as 1925 RF at Heidelberg Observatory in September 1929. The body's observation arc begins at with its identification as 1931 TP at Simeiz Observatory in October 1931, more than three years prior to its official discovery observation at Johannesburge.

== Physical characteristics ==
Botha is an assumed carbonaceous C-type asteroid.

=== Rotation period ===
In September 2003, a fragmentary rotational lightcurve of Botha was obtained from photometric observations by Swiss astronomers Stefano Sposetti and Raoul Behrend. Lightcurve analysis gave a tentative rotation period of 4 hours with a brightness amplitude of 0.21 magnitude (U=1+). As of 2017, no secure period has been obtained.

=== Diameter and albedo ===
According to the surveys carried out by the Infrared Astronomical Satellite IRAS, the Japanese Akari satellite and the NEOWISE mission of NASA's Wide-field Infrared Survey Explorer, Botha measures between 38.41 and 70.34 kilometers in diameter and its surface has an albedo between 0.014 and 0.05.

The Collaborative Asteroid Lightcurve Link derives an albedo of 0.0295 and a diameter of 48.82 kilometers based on an absolute magnitude of 11.0.

== Naming ==
This minor planet was named after Louis Botha (1862–1919), the first Prime Minister of South Africa of the Union of South Africa, which existed between 1910 and 1961. The official naming citation was published by the Minor Planet Center in April 1953 (M.P.C. 908).
