= 1242 Zambesia =

Main-belt asteroid

Discovery
- Discovered by: C. Jackson
- Discovery site: Johannesburg Obs.
- Discovery date: 28 April 1932

Designations
- Named after: Zambezi basin (southern Africa)
- Alternative designations: 1932 HL · 1947 TE; 1948 AC · 1967 EF; A908 BF
- Minor planet category: main-belt · (middle) background

Orbital characteristics
- Epoch 4 September 2017 (JD 2458000.5)
- Uncertainty parameter 0
- Observation arc: 109.42 yr (39,966 days)
- Aphelion: 3.2569 AU
- Perihelion: 2.2201 AU
- Semi-major axis: 2.7385 AU
- Eccentricity: 0.1893
- Orbital period (sidereal): 4.53 yr (1,655 days)
- Mean anomaly: 139.42°
- Mean motion: 0° 13^{m} 3^{s} / day
- Inclination: 10.163°
- Longitude of ascending node: 350.01°
- Argument of perihelion: 52.968°

Physical characteristics
- Dimensions: 42.16±11.24 km 47.54 km (derived); 47.594±0.347 km 47.70±1.6 km 52.668±0.952 km 53.70±3.05 km 62.23±0.79 km 72.818±22.99 km
- Synodic rotation period: 15.72±0.14 h (Note: Aznar, A.; Garceran, A.C.; Mansego, E.A.; Rodriguez, P.B.; et al. (2016) Minor Planet Bul. 43, 174-181.; rotation period 15.72±0.14 hours with a brightness amplitude of 0.15±0.01 mag. Quality code of 2.); 17.305 h (Note: Anonymous lightcurve (2011) for (1242) Zambesia: rotation period 17.305 hours with a brightness amplitude of 0.24 mag. Quality code of 2.) >24 h (poor)
- Geometric albedo: 0.0252±0.0184; 0.04±0.01; 0.043±0.001; 0.045±0.032; 0.0541 (derived); 0.058±0.010; 0.0581±0.0040; 0.0708±0.005
- Spectral type: C (S3OS2)
- Absolute magnitude (H): 10.10 · 10.40 · 10.41 · 10.87

1242 Zambesia (prov. designation: 1932 HL) is a dark background asteroid from the central regions of the asteroid belt, approximately 48 kilometers (30 miles) in diameter. It was discovered on 28 April 1932, by South African astronomer Cyril Jackson at the Union Observatory in Johannesburg. The asteroid was named for the large Zambezi basin in southern Africa.

== Orbit and classification ==
Zambesia is a non-family asteroid from the main belt's background population. It orbits the Sun in the central main-belt at a distance of 2.2–3.3 AU once every 4 years and 6 months (1,655 days; semi-major axis of 2.74 AU). Its orbit has an eccentricity of 0.19 and an inclination of 10° with respect to the ecliptic.

The asteroid was first observed as A908 BF at Taunton Observatory (803) in January 1908. The body's observation arc begins at the United States Naval Observatory (786) in February 1908, more than 26 years prior to its official discovery observation at Johannesburg.

== Naming ==
This minor planet was named after the Zambezi river valley, partially part of the former British Central Africa Protectorate. The official naming citation was mentioned in The Names of the Minor Planets by Paul Herget in 1955 (H 114). The large Zambezi basin stretches across modern Angola, Botswana, Mozambique, Namibia, Zambia and Zimbabwe.

== Physical characteristics ==
In both the Tholen- and SMASS-like taxonomy of the Small Solar System Objects Spectroscopic Survey (S3OS2), Zambesia is a common, carbonaceous C-type asteroid.

=== Rotation period ===
In October 2015, a rotational lightcurve of Zambesia was obtained by a group of Spanish astronomers. Lightcurve analysis gave a rotation period of 15.72 hours with a brightness variation of 0.15 magnitude (U=2). Previous photometric observations gave a divergent period of 17.305 and 24+ hours (U=1/2).

=== Diameter and albedo ===
According to the surveys carried out by the Infrared Astronomical Satellite IRAS, the Japanese Akari satellite and the NEOWISE mission of NASA's Wide-field Infrared Survey Explorer, Zambesia measures between 42.16 and 72.818 kilometers in diameter and its surface has an albedo between 0.0252 and 0.0708.

The Collaborative Asteroid Lightcurve Link derives an albedo of 0.0541 and a diameter of 47.54 kilometers based on an absolute magnitude of 10.4.
