= Cyril Jackson (astronomer) =

South African astronomer

Asteroids discovered: 72
1116 Catriona	5 April 1929
1186 Turnera	1 August 1929
1193 Africa	24 April 1931
1194 Aletta	13 May 1931
1195 Orangia	24 May 1931
1196 Sheba	21 May 1931
1197 Rhodesia	9 June 1931
1242 Zambesia	28 April 1932
1243 Pamela	7 May 1932
1244 Deira	25 May 1932
1245 Calvinia	26 May 1932
1246 Chaka	23 July 1932
1248 Jugurtha	1 September 1932
1264 Letaba	21 April 1933
1268 Libya	29 April 1930
1278 Kenya	15 June 1933
1279 Uganda	15 June 1933
1282 Utopia	17 August 1933
1318 Nerina	24 March 1934
1319 Disa	19 March 1934
1320 Impala	13 May 1934
1321 Majuba	7 May 1934
1323 Tugela	19 May 1934
1324 Knysna	15 June 1934
1325 Inanda	14 July 1934
1326 Losaka	14 July 1934
1327 Namaqua	7 September 1934
1349 Bechuana	13 June 1934
1354 Botha	3 April 1935
1355 Magoeba	30 April 1935
1356 Nyanza	3 May 1935
1357 Khama	2 July 1935
1358 Gaika	21 July 1935
1359 Prieska	22 July 1935
1360 Tarka	22 July 1935
1362 Griqua	31 July 1935
1367 Nongoma	3 July 1934
1368 Numidia	30 April 1935
1393 Sofala	25 May 1936
1394 Algoa	12 June 1936
1396 Outeniqua	9 August 1936
1397 Umtata	9 August 1936
1427 Ruvuma	16 May 1937
1428 Mombasa	5 July 1937
1429 Pemba	2 July 1937
1430 Somalia	5 July 1937
1431 Luanda	29 July 1937
1432 Ethiopia	1 August 1937
1456 Saldanha	2 July 1937
1467 Mashona	30 July 1938
1468 Zomba	23 July 1938
1474 Beira	20 August 1935
1490 Limpopo	14 June 1936
1505 Koranna	21 April 1939
1506 Xosa	15 May 1939
1595 Tanga^{A}	19 June 1930
1634 Ndola	19 August 1935
1638 Ruanda	3 May 1935
1641 Tana	25 July 1935
1676 Kariba	15 June 1939
1712 Angola	28 May 1935
1784 Benguella	30 June 1935
1816 Liberia	29 January 1936
1817 Katanga	20 June 1939
1948 Kampala	3 April 1935
1949 Messina	8 July 1936
2066 Palala	4 June 1934
2825 Crosby	19 September 1938
2865 Laurel	31 July 1935
3768 Monroe	5 September 1937
(5452) 1937 NN	5 July 1937
7102 Neilbone	12 July 1936
^{(A)} with H. E. Wood

Cyril V. Jackson (5 December 1903 – February 1988) was a South African astronomer, known for discovering 72 asteroids and a number of comets.

He was born in Ossett, Yorkshire in England; his father emigrated to South Africa in 1911. He earned his B.Sc. at the University of the Witwatersrand.

He worked at Union Observatory in Johannesburg from 1928 to 1947 (IAU code 078, previously known as Transvaal Observatory and later known as Republic Observatory).

He served with South African forces in the Second World War, and was mentioned in despatches.

After the war he was director of the Yale-Columbia Southern Observatory (YCSO) station in Johannesburg (IAU code 077), which had been established by Yale University in the 1920s. Columbia University subsequently collaborated in that venture and the operation became known as the Yale-Columbia Southern Observatory (YCSO, Inc. was formally created in 1962).

Due to light pollution that observatory had to be shut down in 1951 and he supervised the move of its instrument, a 26-inch refracting telescope, to Mount Stromlo Observatory in Australia (IAU code 414). This Yale-Columbia telescope was given to the Australian National University in July 1963, and was destroyed in the 18 January 2003 firestorm that devastated Mount Stromlo.

Jackson worked at Mount Stromlo from 1957 to 1963. In 1963, Yale reopened its Columbia Southern Observatory at El Leoncito, Argentina (IAU code 808), and he served as its director there until 1966, when he retired. He discovered a number of comets, including the periodic comets 47P/Ashbrook-Jackson and 58P/Jackson-Neujmin. He also discovered 72 asteroids in the earlier part of his career at Union Observatory.
