= 1430 Somalia =

Main-belt asteroid

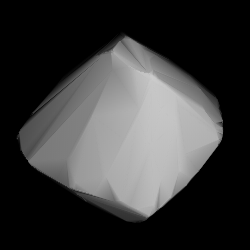
- Modelled shape of Somalia from its lightcurve

Discovery
- Discovered by: C. Jackson
- Discovery site: Johannesburg Obs.
- Discovery date: 5 July 1937

Designations
- Named after: Somalia (African country)
- Alternative designations: 1937 NK · 1929 RQ; 1954 UR_{1} · 1957 HT; 1962 VF
- Minor planet category: main-belt · (middle) background · Astraea

Orbital characteristics
- Epoch 4 September 2017 (JD 2458000.5)
- Uncertainty parameter 0
- Observation arc: 79.73 yr (29,122 days)
- Aphelion: 3.0674 AU
- Perihelion: 2.0508 AU
- Semi-major axis: 2.5591 AU
- Eccentricity: 0.1986
- Orbital period (sidereal): 4.09 yr (1,495 days)
- Mean anomaly: 184.53°
- Mean motion: 0° 14^{m} 26.88^{s} / day
- Inclination: 3.2883°
- Longitude of ascending node: 327.25°
- Argument of perihelion: 351.42°

Physical characteristics
- Dimensions: 8.77±1.58 km 9.352±0.133 km 9.44±0.36 km 9.674±0.089 km 10.79 km (calculated)
- Synodic rotation period: 6.90907±0.00005 h 6.910±0.001 h 6.913±0.001 h
- Geometric albedo: 0.1436±0.0287; 0.153±0.032; 0.162±0.014; 0.20 (assumed); 0.31±0.14
- Spectral type: S (assumed)
- Absolute magnitude (H): 12.1 · 12.2 · 12.35±0.35 · 12.41 · 12.80

1430 Somalia, provisional designation 1937 NK, is a stony background asteroid from the central regions of the asteroid belt, approximately 10 kilometers in diameter. It was discovered on 5 July 1937, by astronomer Cyril Jackson at the Union Observatory in Johannesburg. It was named for the African country of Somalia.

== Orbit and classification ==
Based on the hierarchical clustering method, Somalia is a non-family asteroid of the main belt's background population (Nesvorný), as well as a core member of the Astraea family (Milani and Knežević). It orbits the Sun in the central asteroid belt at a distance of 2.1–3.1 AU once every 4 years and 1 month (1,495 days). Its orbit has an eccentricity of 0.20 and an inclination of 3° with respect to the ecliptic.

The asteroid was first identified as 1929 RQ at Simeiz or Lowell observatories in September 1929. The body's observation arc begins with its official discovery observation at Johannesburg in 1937.

== Physical characteristics ==
Somalia is an assumed stony S-type asteroid.

=== Lightcurves ===
In 2011, two rotational lightcurves of Somalia were obtained from photometric observations by French amateur astronomer René Roy, and by astronomers at the Bassano Bresciano Observatory (565) in Italy. Lightcurve analysis gave a rotation period of 6.910 and 6.913 hours with a brightness amplitude of 0.40 and 0.45 magnitude, respectively (U=3-/3).

In 2016, a modeled lightcurve was derived from various photometric database sources, giving a concurring sidereal period of 6.90907 hours. The modelled lightcurve also determined two spin axis of (297.0°, 42.0°) and (128.0°, 47.0°) in ecliptic coordinates.

=== Diameter and albedo ===
According to the surveys carried out by the Japanese Akari satellite and the NEOWISE mission of NASA's Wide-field Infrared Survey Explorer, Somalia measures between 8.77 and 9.674 kilometers in diameter and its surface has an albedo between 0.1436 and 0.31.

The Collaborative Asteroid Lightcurve Link assumes a standard albedo for stony asteroids of 0.20 and calculates a diameter of 10.79 kilometers based on an absolute magnitude of 12.2.

== Naming ==
This minor planet was named after the country of Somalia, located in the Horn of Africa. The official naming citation was published by the Minor Planet Center on 1 February 1980 (M.P.C. 5181).
