= 1246 Chaka =

Main-belt asteroid

Discovery
- Discovered by: C. Jackson
- Discovery site: Johannesburg Obs.
- Discovery date: 23 July 1932

Designations
- Named after: Shaka (King of the Zulus)
- Alternative designations: 1932 OA
- Minor planet category: main-belt · (middle) background

Orbital characteristics
- Epoch 27 April 2019 (JD 2458600.5)
- Uncertainty parameter 0
- Observation arc: 86.29 yr (31,519 d)
- Aphelion: 3.4329 AU
- Perihelion: 1.8068 AU
- Semi-major axis: 2.6198 AU
- Eccentricity: 0.3103
- Orbital period (sidereal): 4.24 yr (1,549 d)
- Mean anomaly: 128.91°
- Mean motion: 0° 13^{m} 56.64^{s} / day
- Inclination: 16.004°
- Longitude of ascending node: 290.52°
- Argument of perihelion: 54.847°

Physical characteristics
- Mean diameter: 17.634±0.498 km 17.73±3.89 km 18.11±0.9 km 19.596±0.035 km 20.84±1.39 km
- Synodic rotation period: 25.462±0.001 h (Note: Joe Garlitz (2013; web) observations of (1246) Chaka at the Elgin Observatory from October 2013. Posted data on the web site of the Collaborative Asteroid Lightcurve Link. Results: rotation period of 25.462±0.001 hours with a brightness amplitude of 0.18±0.02 mag. Quality code is 3. Summary figures at the LCDB. Also see Observers homepage.)
- Geometric albedo: 0.195; 0.2045; 0.2351; 0.26; 0.310
- Spectral type: A (S3OS2-TH); Sl (S3OS2-BB)
- Absolute magnitude (H): 10.8; 10.9

1246 Chaka, provisional designation 1932 OA, is a background asteroid from the central regions of the asteroid belt, approximately 18 kilometers (11 miles) in diameter. It was discovered on 23 July 1932, by South African astronomer Cyril Jackson at the Union Observatory in Johannesburg. The uncommon A/Sl-type asteroid has a longer than average rotation period of 25.5 hours. It was named for the Zulu King Shaka.

== Orbit and classification ==
Chaka is a non-family asteroid from the main belt's background population. It orbits the Sun in the central asteroid belt at a distance of 1.8–3.4 AU once every 4 years and 3 months (1,549 days; semi-major axis of 2.62 AU). Its orbit has an eccentricity of 0.31 and an inclination of 16° with respect to the ecliptic. The body's observation arc begins with its first observation at Johannesburg on 4 July 1932, three weeks prior to its official discovery observation.

== Naming ==
This minor planet was named after Shaka (c.1787–1828), also Chaka or Tchaka, founder and one of the most influential monarchs of the Zulu Kingdom. The official naming citation was mentioned in The Names of the Minor Planets by Paul Herget in 1955 (H 115).

== Physical characteristics ==
Chaka's spectral type has been determined during the Small Solar System Objects Spectroscopic Survey (S3OS2). In the Tholen-like taxonomic variant of the survey, the asteroid is a rare A-type, while in the SMASS-like variant it is a Sl-subtype, that transitions between the common S- and uncommon L-type asteroids.

=== Rotation period ===
In October 2013, a rotational lightcurve of Chaka was obtained from photometric observations by Joe Garlitz at his Elgin Observatory. Lightcurve analysis gave a well-defined rotation period of 25.462±0.001 hours with a brightness amplitude of 0.18 magnitude (U=3). Other period determinations were made by European astronomers (20 h; Δ0.2) at OHP and La Silla in October 1996 (U=2), and by Andrea Ferrero (25.44 h; Δ0.25) at the Italian Bigmuskie Observatory (B88) in November 2013 (U=2).

=== Diameter and albedo ===
According to the surveys carried out by the Infrared Astronomical Satellite IRAS and the NEOWISE mission of NASA's Wide-field Infrared Survey Explorer, Chaka measures between 17.63 and 20.84 kilometers in diameter and its surface has an albedo between 0.195 and 0.310. The Collaborative Asteroid Lightcurve Link adopts the results obtained by IRAS, that is, an albedo of 0.2351 and a diameter of 18.11 kilometers based on an absolute magnitude of 10.9.
