= 1394 Algoa =

Main-belt asteroid

Discovery
- Discovered by: C. Jackson
- Discovery site: Johannesburg Obs.
- Discovery date: 12 June 1936

Designations
- Named after: Algoa Bay (in South Africa)
- Alternative designations: 1936 LK · 1929 TT; 1933 UY_{1}
- Minor planet category: main-belt · (inner)

Orbital characteristics
- Epoch 4 September 2017 (JD 2458000.5)
- Uncertainty parameter 0
- Observation arc: 80.42 yr (29,372 days)
- Aphelion: 2.6253 AU
- Perihelion: 2.2531 AU
- Semi-major axis: 2.4392 AU
- Eccentricity: 0.0763
- Orbital period (sidereal): 3.81 yr (1,391 days)
- Mean anomaly: 94.682°
- Mean motion: 0° 15^{m} 31.32^{s} / day
- Inclination: 2.6746°
- Longitude of ascending node: 178.83°
- Argument of perihelion: 114.12°

Physical characteristics
- Dimensions: 14.22 km (calculated)
- Synodic rotation period: 2.768±0.001 h
- Geometric albedo: 0.20 (assumed)
- Spectral type: S
- Absolute magnitude (H): 11.11±0.22 · 11.6

1394 Algoa, provisional designation 1936 LK, is a stony asteroid from the inner regions of the asteroid belt, approximately 14 kilometers in diameter. It was discovered on 12 June 1936, by English-born South-African astronomer Cyril Jackson at Union Observatory in Johannesburg, South Africa. The asteroid was named after the historical Algoa Bay.

== Orbit and classification ==
Algoa orbits the Sun in the inner main-belt at a distance of 2.3–2.6 AU once every 3 years and 10 months (1,391 days). Its orbit has an eccentricity of 0.08 and an inclination of 3° with respect to the ecliptic. Prior to its discovery observation in 1936, Algoa was identified as 1929 TT and 1933 UY_{1} at Lowell Observatory and Uccle Observatory, respectively. These observations, however, remained unused to extend the body's observation arc.

== Physical characteristics ==
In 2012, two rotational lightcurves of Algoa were obtained at the U.S. Etscorn Observatory, New Mexico, and at the Riverland Dingo Observatory, Australia. They gave a well-defined, concurring rotation period of 2.768 hours with a brightness variation of 0.20 and 0.21 magnitude, respectively (U=3-/3). The Collaborative Asteroid Lightcurve Link assumes a standard albedo for stony S-type asteroids of 0.20, and calculates a diameter of 14.2 kilometers with an absolute magnitude of 11.6.

== Naming ==
This minor planet was named after the historical Algoa Bay, located approximately 700 kilometers east of the Cape of Good Hope, South Africa. The official naming citation was published by the Minor Planet Center in April 1953 (M.P.C. 909).
