= 1368 Numidia =

Asteroid

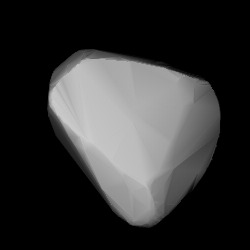
- Modelled shape of Numidia from its lightcurve

Discovery
- Discovered by: C. Jackson
- Discovery site: Johannesburg Obs.
- Discovery date: 30 April 1935

Designations
- Pronunciation: /njuːˈmɪdiə/
- Named after: Numidia (ancient Berber kingdom)
- Alternative designations: 1935 HD · 1928 SN; 1931 JF · 1935 KB; 1936 QN · 1953 YK
- Minor planet category: main-belt · (inner) background · Maria

Orbital characteristics
- Epoch 4 September 2017 (JD 2458000.5)
- Uncertainty parameter 0
- Observation arc: 86.45 yr (31,577 days)
- Aphelion: 2.6814 AU
- Perihelion: 2.3673 AU
- Semi-major axis: 2.5243 AU
- Eccentricity: 0.0622
- Orbital period (sidereal): 4.01 yr (1,465 days)
- Mean anomaly: 146.05°
- Mean motion: 0° 14^{m} 44.52^{s} / day
- Inclination: 14.823°
- Longitude of ascending node: 18.130°
- Argument of perihelion: 264.36°

Physical characteristics
- Dimensions: 15.93±0.37 km 19.24 km (derived); 19.29±0.9 km 19.591±0.213 km 19.899±0.110 km 20.66±0.82 km
- Synodic rotation period: 3.64 h 3.640739 h 3.640740 h
- Geometric albedo: 0.177±0.016; 0.1838±0.0295; 0.1918 (derived); 0.2035±0.019; 0.298±0.021
- Spectral type: S (assumed); B–V = 0.860; U–B = 0.360
- Absolute magnitude (H): 10.92 · 10.99

1368 Numidia, provisional designation 1935 HD, is a stony background asteroid from the central regions of the asteroid belt, approximately 19 kilometers in diameter. It was discovered on 30 April 1935, by South African astronomer Cyril Jackson at the Union Observatory in Johannesburg. The asteroid was named after the ancient North African kingdom of Numidia.

== Orbit and classification ==
Based on the hierarchical clustering method, Numidia has both been classified as a non-family asteroid from the main belt's background population (Nesvorný), and as a core member of the Maria family (Milani and Knežević). It orbits the Sun in the intermediate asteroid belt at a distance of 2.4–2.7 AU once every 4.01 years (1,465 days; semi-major axis of 2.52 AU). Its orbit has an eccentricity of 0.06 and an inclination of 15° with respect to the ecliptic.

The asteroid was first identified as 1928 SN at Uccle Observatory in September 1928. The body's observation arc begins at Johannesburg in May 1931, three weeks after its official discovery observation.

== Naming ==
This minor planet was named after the ancient Berber kingdom of Numidia, that was located in North Africa, in what is now Algeria. The official naming citation was mentioned in The Names of the Minor Planets by Paul Herget in 1955 (H 124).

== Physical characteristics ==
Numidia is an assumed stony S-type asteroid.

=== Rotation period and poles ===
In May 1983, a first rotational lightcurve of Numidia was obtained from photometric observations by American astronomer Richard Binzel. Lightcurve analysis gave a well-defined rotation period of 3.64 hours with a brightness amplitude of 0.35 magnitude (U=3).

Modeling of the asteroid's lightcurve gave a concurring sidereal period of 3.640739 and 3.640740 hours, respectively. In 2016, modeling also determined a pole of (201.0°, −62.0°) in ecliptic coordinates (λ, β).

=== Diameter and albedo ===
According to the surveys carried out by the Infrared Astronomical Satellite IRAS, the Japanese Akari satellite and the NEOWISE mission of NASA's Wide-field Infrared Survey Explorer, Numidia measures between 15.93 and 20.66 kilometers in diameter and its surface has an albedo between 0.177 and 0.298.

The Collaborative Asteroid Lightcurve Link derives an albedo of 0.1918 and a diameter of 19.24 kilometers based on an absolute magnitude of 10.99.
