= 1393 Sofala =

Main-belt asteroid

Discovery
- Discovered by: C. Jackson
- Discovery site: Johannesburg Obs.
- Discovery date: 25 May 1936

Designations
- Named after: Sofala (Province in Mozambique)
- Alternative designations: 1936 KD · 1928 FB; 1951 GL · 1956 TE; 1958 CA · 1971 SJ; 1975 UB
- Minor planet category: main-belt · (inner); Vestian · background

Orbital characteristics
- Epoch 4 September 2017 (JD 2458000.5)
- Uncertainty parameter 0
- Observation arc: 89.54 yr (32,703 days)
- Aphelion: 2.6997 AU
- Perihelion: 2.1685 AU
- Semi-major axis: 2.4341 AU
- Eccentricity: 0.1091
- Orbital period (sidereal): 3.80 yr (1,387 days)
- Mean anomaly: 146.78°
- Mean motion: 0° 15^{m} 34.2^{s} / day
- Inclination: 5.8476°
- Longitude of ascending node: 56.701°
- Argument of perihelion: 183.46°

Physical characteristics
- Dimensions: 11.214±0.495 km 11.30 km (calculated)
- Synodic rotation period: 7.8 h (poor); 16.5931±0.0005 h 108.259±0.7031 h
- Geometric albedo: 0.20 (assumed); 0.223±0.046
- Spectral type: S (assumed)
- Absolute magnitude (H): 11.835±0.002 (R) · 12.00 · 12.1 · 12.42±0.78

1393 Sofala, provisional designation 1936 KD, is a Vestian asteroid from the inner regions of the asteroid belt, approximately 11 kilometers in diameter. It was discovered on 25 May 1936, by South African astronomer Cyril Jackson at the Union Observatory in Johannesburg. The asteroid was named after the province of Sofala in Mozambique.

== Orbit and classification ==
Sofala is a member of the Vesta family (401), the second-largest asteroid family of the main-belt by number of members. However, it is also considered to be a non-family asteroid of the main belt's background population when applying the Hierarchical Clustering Method to its proper orbital elements. It orbits the Sun in the inner asteroid belt at a distance of 2.2–2.7 AU once every 3 years and 10 months (1,387 days). Its orbit has an eccentricity of 0.11 and an inclination of 6° with respect to the ecliptic.

The asteroid was first identified as 1928 FB at Heidelberg Observatory in March 1928. The body's observation arc begins with its official discovery observation at Johannesburg in 1936.

== Physical characteristics ==
Sofala is an assumed stony S-type asteroid.

=== Rotation period ===
The asteroid has an ambiguous lightcurve. While a lightcurve, obtained at the Palomar Transient Factory in September 2013, gave a rotation period of 108.259 hours with a brightness amplitude of 0.48 magnitude (U=2), another lightcurve modeled from combined dense and sparse photometry gave a sidereal period of 16.5931 hours.(U=2). If the first result were correct, Sofala would be one of few hundred known slow rotators with a period above 100 hours. The Lightcurve Data Base, however, adopts the shorter period from the modeled lightcurve. A third lightcurve with a period of 7.8 hours by René Roy from 2008 has received a poor rating.

=== Diameter and albedo ===
According to the survey carried out by the NEOWISE mission of NASA's Wide-field Infrared Survey Explorer, Sofala measures between 11.21 kilometers in diameter and its surface has an albedo of 0.223.

The Collaborative Asteroid Lightcurve Link assumes a standard albedo for stony asteroids of 0.20 and calculates a diameter of 11.30 kilometers based on an absolute magnitude of 12.1.

== Naming ==
This minor planet was named after Sofala Province in central-eastern Mozambique. It is the country's largest province. Its capital city is Beira after which the Mars-crosser 1474 Beira, another discovery by Cyril Jackson, is named. The official naming citation was published by the Minor Planet Center in April 1953 (M.P.C. 909).
