= 1318 Nerina =

Main-belt asteroid

Discovery
- Discovered by: C. Jackson
- Discovery site: Johannesburg Obs.
- Discovery date: 24 March 1934

Designations
- Pronunciation: /nɪˈraɪnɑː/
- Named after: Nerine (flowering plant)
- Alternative designations: 1934 FG · 1955 FA
- Minor planet category: main-belt · (inner); Phocaea

Orbital characteristics
- Epoch 23 March 2018 (JD 2458200.5)
- Uncertainty parameter 0
- Observation arc: 84.16 yr (30,740 d)
- Aphelion: 2.7778 AU
- Perihelion: 1.8368 AU
- Semi-major axis: 2.3073 AU
- Eccentricity: 0.2039
- Orbital period (sidereal): 3.50 yr (1,280 d)
- Mean anomaly: 346.11°
- Mean motion: 0° 16^{m} 52.32^{s} / day
- Inclination: 24.663°
- Longitude of ascending node: 358.33°
- Argument of perihelion: 196.24°

Physical characteristics
- Mean diameter: 10.68±0.72 km 13.02±0.6 km 13.272±0.213 km
- Synodic rotation period: 2.5280±0.0005 h
- Geometric albedo: 0.176±0.023; 0.1811; 0.269
- Spectral type: M · S (assumed); X (S3OS2-TH); Xe (S3OS2-BB)
- Absolute magnitude (H): 11.90; 12.20

1318 Nerina (/nɪˈraɪnɑː/), provisional designation 1934 FG, is a Phocaea asteroid from the inner regions of the asteroid belt, approximately 13 kilometers (8 miles) in diameter. It was discovered on 24 March 1934, by South African astronomer Cyril Jackson at the Union Observatory in Johannesburg. The possibly metallic X-type asteroid has a notably short rotation period of 2.5 hours. It was named for the flowering plant Nerine, also known as "Guernsey lily" or "Jersey lily".

== Orbit and classification ==
Nerina is a core member of the stony Phocaea family (701), an asteroid family with nearly two thousand members, named after its largest member, 25 Phocaea. It orbits the Sun in the inner main-belt at a distance of 1.8–2.8 AU once every 3 years and 6 months (1,280 days; semi-major axis of 2.31 AU). Its orbit has an eccentricity of 0.20 and an inclination of 25° with respect to the ecliptic. The body's observation arc begins with its official discovery observation at Johannesburg in March 1934.

== Naming ==
This minor planet was named after the bulbous herb Nerine, native to South Africa (it is also known as Guernsey lily, spider lily or Jersey lily) a genus of flowering plants within the family Amaryllidaceae. The official naming citation was mentioned in The Names of the Minor Planets by Paul Herget in 1955 (H 120). Several asteroids were named after plants, in particular flowering plants (also see list of minor planets named after animals and plants).

== Physical characteristics ==
Derived from the Phocaea family's overall spectral type, Nerina is an assumed S-type asteroid, while the Wide-field Infrared Survey Explorer (WISE) characterized it as a metallic M-type asteroid. In the Tholen- and SMASS-like taxonomy of the Small Solar System Objects Spectroscopic Survey (S3OS2), however, Nerina is an X- and Xe-subtype that transitions to the bright E-type asteroids, respectively.

=== Rotation period ===
A large number of rotational lightcurves of Nerina have been obtained from photometric observations since 2004. The best-rated lightcurve by Robert Stephens at the Santana Observatory (646) gave a rotation period of 2.5280±0.0005 hours and a consolidated brightness amplitude between 0.06 and 0.32 magnitude (U=3). Notably for an asteroid of its size, Nerina is a near-fast rotator, which have periods below of 2.2 hours and are typically much smaller bodies (see List of fast rotators).

=== Diameter and albedo ===
According to the surveys carried out by the Infrared Astronomical Satellite IRAS, the Japanese Akari satellite and the NEOWISE mission of NASA's WISE telescope, Nerina measures between 7.87 and 13.379 kilometers in diameter and its surface has an albedo between 0.1721 and 0.376. The Collaborative Asteroid Lightcurve Link derives an albedo of 0.1397 and a diameter of 12.91 kilometers based on an absolute magnitude of 12.2.
