= 1193 Africa =

Main-belt asteroid

Discovery
- Discovered by: C. Jackson
- Discovery site: Johannesburg Obs.
- Discovery date: 24 April 1931

Designations
- Named after: Africa (continent)
- Alternative designations: 1931 HB
- Minor planet category: main-belt · (middle); Eunomia

Orbital characteristics
- Epoch 4 September 2017 (JD 2458000.5)
- Uncertainty parameter 0
- Observation arc: 86.20 yr (31,484 days)
- Aphelion: 2.9728 AU
- Perihelion: 2.3198 AU
- Semi-major axis: 2.6463 AU
- Eccentricity: 0.1234
- Orbital period (sidereal): 4.30 yr (1,572 days)
- Mean anomaly: 9.0113°
- Mean motion: 0° 13^{m} 44.4^{s} / day
- Inclination: 14.141°
- Longitude of ascending node: 49.538°
- Argument of perihelion: 183.92°

Physical characteristics
- Dimensions: 12.220±0.102 km 13 km (est. at 0.21)
- Geometric albedo: 0.21 (derived); 0.247±0.038
- Spectral type: S(derived)
- Absolute magnitude (H): 11.8

1193 Africa, provisional designation 1931 HB, is a stony Eunomian asteroid from the central region of the asteroid belt, approximately 12 kilometers in diameter. It was discovered by South African astronomer Cyril Jackson at Johannesburg Observatory on 24 April 1931. The asteroid was named for the African continent.

== Orbit and classification ==
Africa is a member of the Eunomia family (502), a large group of typically S-type asteroids and the most prominent family in the intermediate main-belt. It orbits the Sun at a distance of 2.3–3.0 AU once every 4 years and 4 months (1,572 days). Its orbit has an eccentricity of 0.12 and an inclination of 14° with respect to the ecliptic. The body's observation arc begins with its official discovery observation at Johannesburg.

== Physical characteristics ==
=== Diameter and albedo ===
According to the survey carried out by NASA's Wide-field Infrared Survey Explorer with its subsequent NEOWISE mission, Africa measures 12.22 kilometers in diameter and its surface has an albedo of 0.247. Based on a generic magnitude-to-diameter conversion, Africa measures 13 kilometers in diameter, using an absolute magnitude of 11.8 and a standard albedo for Eunomian asteroids of 0.21, derived from 15 Eunomia, the family's largest member and namesake.

== Photometry ==
As of 2017, no rotational lightcurve of Africa has been obtained from photometric observations. The body's rotation period, poles and shape still remain unknown.

== Naming ==
This minor planet was named for Africa, the large continent on which Johannesburg is located. The official naming citation was also mentioned in Paul Herget's The Names of the Minor Planets in 1955 (H 111).
