= 1359 Prieska =

Main-belt asteroid

Discovery
- Discovered by: C. Jackson
- Discovery site: Johannesburg Obs.
- Discovery date: 22 July 1935

Designations
- Named after: Prieska (South African town)
- Alternative designations: 1935 OC · A903 UE; A917 HA
- Minor planet category: main-belt · (outer)

Orbital characteristics
- Epoch 4 September 2017 (JD 2458000.5)
- Uncertainty parameter 0
- Observation arc: 113.69 yr (41,524 days)
- Aphelion: 3.3306 AU
- Perihelion: 2.9053 AU
- Semi-major axis: 3.1179 AU
- Eccentricity: 0.0682
- Orbital period (sidereal): 5.51 yr (2,011 days)
- Mean anomaly: 232.56°
- Mean motion: 0° 10^{m} 44.4^{s} / day
- Inclination: 11.105°
- Longitude of ascending node: 64.033°
- Argument of perihelion: 343.11°

Physical characteristics
- Dimensions: 36.45±9.67 km 46.096±0.136 km 48.491±0.439 km 52.07 km (derived); 52.64±1.07 km 65.86±16.91 km
- Geometric albedo: 0.03±0.01; 0.042±0.002; 0.0494 (derived); 0.0570±0.0085; 0.059±0.007; 0.07±0.03
- Spectral type: Tholen = CX: · CX: B–V = 0.710; U–B = 0.355
- Absolute magnitude (H): 10.3 · 10.36 · 10.47±0.24 · 10.50

1359 Prieska, provisional designation 1935 OC, is a rare-type carbonaceous asteroid from the outer region of the asteroid belt, approximately 50 kilometers in diameter. It was discovered on 22 July 1935, by English-born South-African astronomer Cyril Jackson at Johannesburg Observatory in South Africa. The asteroid was named after the South African town of Prieska.

== Orbit and classification ==
Prieska orbits the Sun in the outer main-belt at a distance of 2.9–3.3 AU once every 5 years and 6 months (2,011 days). Its orbit has an eccentricity of 0.07 and an inclination of 11° with respect to the ecliptic. In 1903, Prieska was first identified as A903 UE at Heidelberg Observatory, extending the body's observation arc by 32 years prior to its official discovery observation at Johannesburg.

== Physical characteristics ==
According to the surveys carried out by NASA's Wide-field Infrared Survey Explorer with its subsequent NEOWISE mission and the Japanese Akari satellite, Prieska measures between 36.45 and 65.86 kilometers in diameter, and its surface has an albedo between 0.03 and 0.07. The Collaborative Asteroid Lightcurve Link derives an albedo of 0.0494 and a diameter of 52.07 kilometers with an absolute magnitude of 10.3.

=== Spectral type ===
In the Tholen taxonomy, Prieska is a rare CX:-subtype, that transitions from the dark C to the X-type asteroids. Only a few asteroids have been assigned this spectral type by Tholen (also see list of CX-type asteroids).

=== Lightcurves ===
Photometric lightcurve observations of Prieska at the Australian Oakley Southern Sky Observatory (E09) in May 2011 and October 2013, respectively, were inconclusive due to insufficient data. As of 2017, the asteroid's rotation period still remains unknown.

== Naming ==
This minor planet was named for the South African town of Prieska, located on the south bank of the Orange River, in the province of the Northern Cape. The official naming citation was mentioned in The Names of the Minor Planets by Paul Herget in 1955 (H 123).
