= 1431 Luanda =

Asteroid

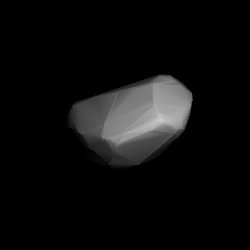
- Modelled shape of Luanda from its lightcurve

Discovery
- Discovered by: C. Jackson
- Discovery site: Johannesburg
- Discovery date: 29 July 1937

Designations
- Named after: Luanda (Capital of Angola)
- Alternative designations: 1937 OB · 1949 KZ
- Minor planet category: main-belt · (middle); Eunomia

Orbital characteristics
- Epoch 4 September 2017 (JD 2458000.5)
- Uncertainty parameter 0
- Observation arc: 80.22 yr (29,300 days)
- Aphelion: 3.0989 AU
- Perihelion: 2.1408 AU
- Semi-major axis: 2.6199 AU
- Eccentricity: 0.1829
- Orbital period (sidereal): 4.24 yr (1,549 days)
- Mean anomaly: 293.57°
- Mean motion: 0° 13^{m} 56.64^{s} / day
- Inclination: 13.987°
- Longitude of ascending node: 117.73°
- Argument of perihelion: 224.19°

Physical characteristics
- Dimensions: 13.608±1.966 km 13.88 km (calculated)
- Synodic rotation period: 4.141±0.004 h 5.360±0.002 h
- Geometric albedo: 0.21 (assumed); 0.360±0.347
- Spectral type: LS · S (assumed)
- Absolute magnitude (H): 11.06 · 11.6 · 11.7 · 12.38±0.42

1431 Luanda, provisional designation 1937 OB, is a stony Eunomian asteroid from the central regions of the asteroid belt, approximately 14 kilometers in diameter. It was discovered on 29 July 1937, by South African astronomer Cyril Jackson at the Union Observatory in Johannesburg. The asteroid was named after the city of Luanda.

== Orbit and classification ==
Luanda is a member of the Eunomia family (502), a prominent family of stony S-type asteroid and the largest one in the intermediate main belt with more than 5,000 members. It orbits the Sun in the central asteroid belt at a distance of 2.1–3.1 AU once every 4 years and 3 months (1,549 days). Its orbit has an eccentricity of 0.18 and an inclination of 14° with respect to the ecliptic. The body's observation arc begins with its official discovery observation at Johannesburg in 1937.

== Physical characteristics ==
Luanda has been characterized as a L/S-type asteroid by Pan-STARRS photometric survey. The LCDB assumes it to be a common stony S-type asteroid, in-line with the family's overall spectral type.

=== Rotation period ===
In December 1997, a rotational lightcurve of Luanda was obtained from photometric observations at the Félix Aguilar Observatory in Argentina . Lightcurve analysis gave a rotation period of 5.360 hours with a brightness variation of 1.0 magnitude (U=2). In January 2007, French amateur astronomer René Roy obtained a period of 4.141 hours with an amplitude of 0.77 magnitude (U=9-). A high brightness amplitude indicates that the body has an elongated rather than spherical shape.

=== Diameter and albedo ===
According to the survey carried out by the NEOWISE mission of NASA's Wide-field Infrared Survey Explorer, Luanda measures 13.61 kilometers in diameter and its surface has an albedo of 0.36.

The Collaborative Asteroid Lightcurve Link assumes a standard albedo for Eunomian asteroids of 0.21 – derived from 15 Eunomia, the parent body of this family – and calculates a diameter of 13.88 kilometers based on an absolute magnitude of 11.6.

== Naming ==
This minor planet was named after the city of Luanda, capital of Angola. The official naming citation was published by the Minor Planet Center on 1 February 1980 (M.P.C. 5182).
