= 1197 Rhodesia =

Asteroid

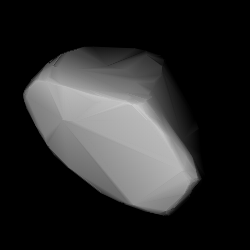
- Shape model of Rhodesia from its lightcurve

Discovery
- Discovered by: C. Jackson
- Discovery site: Johannesburg Obs.
- Discovery date: 9 June 1931

Designations
- Named after: Rhodesia (former state in southern Africa)
- Alternative designations: 1931 LD · 1925 AC; 1970 HL
- Minor planet category: main-belt · (outer) background

Orbital characteristics
- Epoch 23 March 2018 (JD 2458200.5)
- Uncertainty parameter 0
- Observation arc: 93.36 yr (34,098 d)
- Aphelion: 3.5511 AU
- Perihelion: 2.2215 AU
- Semi-major axis: 2.8863 AU
- Eccentricity: 0.2303
- Orbital period (sidereal): 4.90 yr (1,791 d)
- Mean anomaly: 323.09°
- Mean motion: 0° 12^{m} 3.6^{s} / day
- Inclination: 12.985°
- Longitude of ascending node: 255.74°
- Argument of perihelion: 277.16°

Physical characteristics
- Dimensions: 48.0 km × 48.0 km
- Mean diameter: 47.50±3.4 km 47.741±0.163 km 48.92±0.98 km
- Synodic rotation period: 16.060±0.006 h
- Geometric albedo: 0.070; 0.075; 0.0783
- Spectral type: B–V = 0.740±030; C (assumed)
- Absolute magnitude (H): 10.00; 10.18; 10.2

1197 Rhodesia, provisional designation 1931 LD, is a dark background asteroid from the outer regions of the asteroid belt, approximately 48 kilometers (30 miles) in diameter. It was discovered on 9 June 1931, by South African astronomer Cyril Jackson at the Union Observatory in Johannesburg. The likely C-type asteroid has a rotation period of 16.1 hours. It was named for Rhodesia, a former British colony and unrecognised state, which is now Zimbabwe.

== Orbit and classification ==
Rhodesia is a non-family asteroid from the main belt's background population. It orbits the Sun in the outer asteroid belt at a distance of 2.2–3.6 AU once every 4 years and 11 months (1,791 days; semi-major axis of 2.89 AU). Its orbit has an eccentricity of 0.23 and an inclination of 13° with respect to the ecliptic. The asteroid was first observed at Heidelberg Observatory in January 1925. The body's observation arc also begins at Heidelberg in August 1942, more than 11 years after its official discovery observation at Johannesburg.

== Naming ==
This minor planet was named for the former British colony and unrecognized state of Rhodesia (1965–1979) in southern Africa, what is now Zimbabwe. The official naming citation was mentioned in The Names of the Minor Planets by Paul Herget in 1955 (H 111).

== Physical characteristics ==
Rhodesia is an assumed C-type asteroid which agrees with its albedo and its location in the main belt. It has a B–V color index of 0.740.

=== Rotation period ===
In December 2017, a rotational lightcurve of Rhodesia was obtained from photometric observations by Tom Polakis at the Command Module Observatory (V02) in Tempe, Arizona. Lightcurve analysis gave a rotation period of 16.060±0.006 hours with a brightness variation of 0.27 magnitude (U=3-). This result refines previous period determinations of 15.89 and 16.062 hours by Richard Binzel (1984) and Laurent Bernasconi (2005), respectively (U=2/2).

=== Diameter and albedo ===
According to the surveys carried out by the Infrared Astronomical Satellite IRAS, the Japanese Akari satellite and the NEOWISE mission of NASA's Wide-field Infrared Survey Explorer, Rhodesia measures between 46.43 and 52.276 kilometers in diameter and its surface has an albedo between 0.0548 and 0.0783. The Collaborative Asteroid Lightcurve Link derives an albedo of 0.0666 and a diameter of 47.40 kilometers based on an absolute magnitude of 10.18. In August 2015, an occultation by Rhodesia determined a cross-section of 48.0 × 48.0 kilometers (no fit).
