= 1349 Bechuana =

Main-belt asteroid

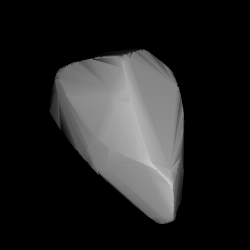
- Shape model of Bechuana from its lightcurve

Discovery
- Discovered by: C. Jackson
- Discovery site: Johannesburg Obs.
- Discovery date: 13 June 1934

Designations
- Named after: Bechuanaland (now Republic of Botswana)
- Alternative designations: 1934 LJ · 1934 NH; 1950 PA · 1950 QO
- Minor planet category: main-belt · (outer) background

Orbital characteristics
- Epoch 4 September 2017 (JD 2458000.5)
- Uncertainty parameter 0
- Observation arc: 83.06 yr (30,338 days)
- Aphelion: 3.4872 AU
- Perihelion: 2.5416 AU
- Semi-major axis: 3.0144 AU
- Eccentricity: 0.1569
- Orbital period (sidereal): 5.23 yr (1,912 days)
- Mean anomaly: 336.81°
- Mean motion: 0° 11^{m} 17.88^{s} / day
- Inclination: 10.049°
- Longitude of ascending node: 307.12°
- Argument of perihelion: 305.30°

Physical characteristics
- Dimensions: 23.773±0.282 km 24.249±0.334 km 25.80±0.37 km 28.57±1.17 km 46.30 km (calculated)
- Synodic rotation period: 15.681±0.0099 h 15.6873±0.0001 h 15.692±0.002 h
- Geometric albedo: 0.057 (assumed); 0.150±0.024; 0.233±0.008; 0.2610±0.0357
- Spectral type: CX · C (assumed)
- Absolute magnitude (H): 10.20 · 10.23±0.44 · 10.250±0.002 (R) · 10.40 · 10.5

1349 Bechuana, provisional designation 1934 LJ, is a background asteroid from the outer regions of the asteroid belt, approximately 26 kilometers in diameter. It was discovered on 13 June 1934, by South-African astronomer Cyril Jackson at the Union Observatory in Johannesburg. The asteroid was named for the former Bechuanaland, what is now the Republic of Botswana.

== Orbit and classification ==
Bechuana is a non-family asteroid from the main belt's background population. It orbits the Sun in the outer asteroid belt at a distance of 2.5–3.5 AU once every 5 years and 3 months (1,912 days; semi-major axis of 3.01 AU). Its orbit has an eccentricity of 0.16 and an inclination of 10° with respect to the ecliptic. The body's observation arc begins with its official discovery observation at Johannesburg in June 1934.

== Physical characteristics ==
Bechuana has been characterized as both a C-type and X-type asteroid by Pan-STARRS photometric survey. The Collaborative Asteroid Lightcurve Link (CALL) assumes it to be a carbonaceous C-type.

=== Rotation period ===
In December 2010, a rotational lightcurve of Bechuana was obtained from photometric observations by astronomers at the Palomar Transient Factory in California. Lightcurve analysis gave a rotation period of 15.681 hours with a brightness variation of 0.29 magnitude (U=2). In January 2011, astronomers Pierre Antonini and Silvano Casulli measured a refined period of 15.692 hours with an amplitude of 0.30 (U=3-).

=== Poles ===
A 2016-published lightcurve, using modeled photometric data from the Lowell Photometric Database, gave a concurring period of 15.6873 hours and determined two spin axis in ecliptic coordinates (λ, β) of (153.0°, 32.0°) and (314.0°, 46.0°).

=== Diameter and albedo ===
According to the surveys carried out by the Japanese Akari satellite and the NEOWISE mission of NASA's Wide-field Infrared Survey Explorer, Bechuana measures between 23.773 and 28.57 kilometers in diameter and its surface has an albedo between 0.150 and 0.2610.

CALL assumes a standard albedo for carbonaceous asteroids of 0.057 and consequently calculates a much larger diameter of 46.30 kilometers based on an absolute magnitude of 10.4.

== Naming ==
This minor planet was named after the Bechuanaland, a British Protectorate from 1884 to 1966 and what is now the Republic of Botswana, north of South Africa. The official naming citation was mentioned in The Names of the Minor Planets by Paul Herget in 1955 (H 122).
