= 1817 Katanga =

Stony main-belt asteroid

Discovery
- Discovered by: C. Jackson
- Discovery site: Johannesburg Obs.
- Discovery date: 20 June 1939

Designations
- Named after: Katanga Province (Congo, Dem. Rep.)
- Alternative designations: 1939 MB · 1928 KD; 1950 NK · 1971 BG
- Minor planet category: main-belt · Phocaea

Orbital characteristics
- Epoch 4 September 2017 (JD 2458000.5)
- Uncertainty parameter 0
- Observation arc: 77.58 yr (28,337 days)
- Aphelion: 2.8258 AU
- Perihelion: 1.9172 AU
- Semi-major axis: 2.3715 AU
- Eccentricity: 0.1916
- Orbital period (sidereal): 3.65 yr (1,334 days)
- Mean anomaly: 173.17°
- Mean motion: 0° 16^{m} 11.64^{s} / day
- Inclination: 25.709°
- Longitude of ascending node: 88.723°
- Argument of perihelion: 140.27°

Physical characteristics
- Dimensions: 9.76±1.21 km 15.89±1.56 km 15.90±1.0 km (IRAS:14); 16.28 km (derived)
- Synodic rotation period: 6.35±0.02 h 7.2165±0.0003 h 8.481±0.003 h
- Geometric albedo: 0.1331±0.018 (IRAS:14); 0.2421 (derived); 0.342±0.151; 0.353±0.089
- Spectral type: S
- Absolute magnitude (H): 10.78 · 11.1 · 11.80 ·

1817 Katanga, provisional designation 1939 MB, is a stony Phocaea asteroid in from the inner regions of the asteroid belt, approximately 16 kilometers in diameter. It was discovered on 20 June 1939, by English-born South African astronomer Cyril Jackson at Johannesburg Observatory in South Africa. It is named for the Katanga Province.

== Orbit and classification ==
The S-type asteroid is a member of the Phocaea family, a smaller population of asteroids with similar orbital characteristics named after their largest member, 25 Phocaea. Katanga orbits the Sun in the inner main-belt at a distance of 1.9–2.8 AU once every 3 years and 8 months (1,334 days). Its orbit has an eccentricity of 0.19 and an inclination of 26° with respect to the ecliptic. Katanga's observation arc begins with its official discovery observation in 1939, as its first observation made at Heidelberg Observatory in 1928, remained unused (1928 KD).

== Lightcurves ==
In April 2008, a rotational lightcurve of Katanga was obtained from photometric observations by American astronomer Brian D. Warner at his Palmer Divide Observatory in Colorado. It gave a rotation period of 8.481 hours with a brightness variation of 0.30 magnitude (U=3). The quality of this result supersedes two periods previously obtained by astronomers Stefano Sposetti and Glenn Malcolm in May and June 2001, respectively (U=2/2).

== Diameter and albedo ==
According to the surveys carried out by the Infrared Astronomical Satellite IRAS, the Japanese Akari satellite, and NASA's Wide-field Infrared Survey Explorer with its subsequent NEOWISE mission, Katanga measures between 9.76 and 15.90 kilometers in diameter, and its surface has an albedo between 0.133 and 0.353. The Collaborative Asteroid Lightcurve Link derives an albedo of 0.242 and a diameter of 16.28 kilometers with an absolute magnitude of 11.1.

== Naming ==
This minor planet was named after the Katanga Province, a rich mining region in the Democratic Republic of the Congo in Central Africa. The approved naming citation was published by the Minor Planet Center on 1 February 1980 (M.P.C. 5183).
