= 1429 Pemba =

Main-belt asteroid

Discovery
- Discovered by: C. Jackson
- Discovery site: Johannesburg Obs.
- Discovery date: 2 July 1937

Designations
- Named after: Pemba Island (African East coast)
- Alternative designations: 1937 NH · 1949 JK
- Minor planet category: main-belt · (inner) background

Orbital characteristics
- Epoch 4 September 2017 (JD 2458000.5)
- Uncertainty parameter 0
- Observation arc: 79.93 yr (29,193 days)
- Aphelion: 3.4109 AU
- Perihelion: 1.7004 AU
- Semi-major axis: 2.5557 AU
- Eccentricity: 0.3347
- Orbital period (sidereal): 4.09 yr (1,492 days)
- Mean anomaly: 207.67°
- Mean motion: 0° 14^{m} 28.32^{s} / day
- Inclination: 7.7492°
- Longitude of ascending node: 47.700°
- Argument of perihelion: 297.82°

Physical characteristics
- Dimensions: 8.71±1.86 km 9.874±0.051 km 10.37 km (taken); 10.371 km 10.531±0.041 km 10.75±0.67 km
- Synodic rotation period: 20 h
- Geometric albedo: 0.1316; 0.154±0.021; 0.1598±0.0235; 0.19±0.11; 0.196±0.022
- Spectral type: S (assumed)
- Absolute magnitude (H): 12.4 · 12.50 · 12.74 · 12.74±0.2

1429 Pemba, provisional designation 1937 NH, is a stony background asteroid from the central regions of the asteroid belt, approximately 10 kilometers in diameter. It was discovered on 2 July 1937, by South African astronomer Cyril Jackson at the Union Observatory in Johannesburg. The asteroid was named for the Pemba Island off the coast of Tanzania.

== Orbit and classification ==
Pemba is a non-family asteroid from the main belt's background population. It orbits the Sun in the central main-belt at a distance of 1.7–3.4 AU once every 4 years and 1 month (1,492 days). Its orbit has an eccentricity of 0.33 and an inclination of 8° with respect to the ecliptic. The body's observation arc begins with its official discovery observation at Johannesburg.

== Physical characteristics ==
Pemba is an assumed stony S-type asteroid.

=== Rotation period ===
In September 1982, a rotational lightcurve of Pemba was obtained from photometric observations. Analysis of the fragmentary lightcurve gave a rotation period of 20 hours with a brightness amplitude of 0.3 magnitude (U=1). As of 2017, no secure period has been determined.

=== Diameter and albedo ===
According to the surveys carried out by the Japanese Akari satellite and the NEOWISE mission of NASA's Wide-field Infrared Survey Explorer, Pemba measures between 8.71 and 10.75 kilometers in diameter and its surface has an albedo between 0.1316 and 0.196.

The Collaborative Asteroid Lightcurve Link adopts Petr Pravec's revised WISE results, that is, an albedo of 0.1316 and a diameter of 10.37 kilometers based on an absolute magnitude of 12.74.

== Naming ==
This minor planet was named for the Pemba Island, Tanzania, part of the Zanzibar Archipelago, which was once under the rule of the Sultan of Zanzibar. It is located off the East Coast of Africa in the Indian Ocean. The official naming citation was published by the Minor Planet Center in April 1953 (M.P.C. 909).
