= 1325 Inanda =

Main-belt asteroid

Discovery
- Discovered by: C. Jackson
- Discovery site: Johannesburg Obs.
- Discovery date: 14 July 1934

Designations
- Named after: Inanda (South African township)
- Alternative designations: 1934 NR · 1926 RP; 1930 OD
- Minor planet category: main-belt · (middle) background

Orbital characteristics
- Epoch 4 September 2017 (JD 2458000.5)
- Uncertainty parameter 0
- Observation arc: 82.80 yr (30,241 days)
- Aphelion: 3.1900 AU
- Perihelion: 1.8917 AU
- Semi-major axis: 2.5408 AU
- Eccentricity: 0.2555
- Orbital period (sidereal): 4.05 yr (1,479 days)
- Mean anomaly: 165.02°
- Mean motion: 0° 14^{m} 36.24^{s} / day
- Inclination: 7.4205°
- Longitude of ascending node: 14.393°
- Argument of perihelion: 336.80°

Physical characteristics
- Dimensions: 9.97±2.30 km 10.87±0.6 km 10.890±0.110 km 12.34±0.61 km
- Synodic rotation period: 20.52±0.05 h (Note: Lightcurve plot of 1325 Inanda, Palmer Divide Observatory, B. D. Warner (2007), with a period of 20.52±0.05 hours and a brightness amplitude of 0.12±0.01 magnitude. Summary figures for (1325) Inanda at Collaborative Asteroid Lightcurve Link (CALL)); 24 h (poor); 141.6±0.2 h (poor)
- Geometric albedo: 0.20±0.13; 0.303±0.034; 0.374±0.041; 0.3742±0.0407; 0.3756±0.043
- Spectral type: S
- Absolute magnitude (H): 11.50 · 11.66±0.28 · 12.2 · 12.37

1325 Inanda, provisional designation 1934 NR, is a stony background asteroid from the central regions of the asteroid belt, approximately 11 kilometers in diameter. It was discovered on 14 July 1934, by South African astronomer Cyril Jackson at the Union Observatory in Johannesburg. The asteroid was named after the township of Inanda in South Africa.

== Orbit and classification ==
Inanda is a non-family asteroid of the main belt's background population. It orbits the Sun in the central main-belt at a distance of 1.9–3.2 AU once every 4 years and 1 month (1,479 days; semi-major axis of 2.54 AU). Its orbit has an eccentricity of 0.26 and an inclination of 7° with respect to the ecliptic.

The asteroid was first identified as 1926 RP at Johannesburg in September 1926. The body's observation arc begins with its official discovery observation in July 1934.

== Physical characteristics ==
Inanda has been characterized as a stony, common S-type asteroid by Pan-STARRS photometric survey.

=== Rotation period ===
In November 2007, a rotational lightcurve of Inanda was obtained from photometric observations by American astronomer Brian Warner at his Palmer Divide Observatory in Colorado. Lightcurve analysis gave an ambiguous rotation period of 20.52 hours with an alternative period solution of 35.83 hours and a brightness amplitude of 0.12 magnitude (U=2). The results supersede previous observations that gave a fragmentary lightcurve with a period of 24 and 141.6 hours respectively (U=1/1).

=== Diameter and albedo ===
According to the surveys carried out by the Infrared Astronomical Satellite IRAS, the Japanese Akari satellite and the NEOWISE mission of NASA's Wide-field Infrared Survey Explorer, Inanda measures between 9.97 and 12.34 kilometers in diameter and its surface has an albedo between 0.20 and 0.3756.

The Collaborative Asteroid Lightcurve Link adopts the results obtained by IRAS, that is, an albedo of 0.3756 and a diameter of 10.87 kilometers based on an absolute magnitude of 11.5.

=== Occultation ===
On 12 November 2007, an occultation suggested that Inanda could be a binary asteroid. However, the asteroid's suspected binary nature has not been mentioned in other studies since then.

== Naming ==
This minor planet was named after the South African, Zulu-speaking Township of Inanda, KwaZulu-Natal. The official naming citation was mentioned in The Names of the Minor Planets by Paul Herget in 1955 (H 121).
