= 1490 Limpopo =

Main-belt asteroid

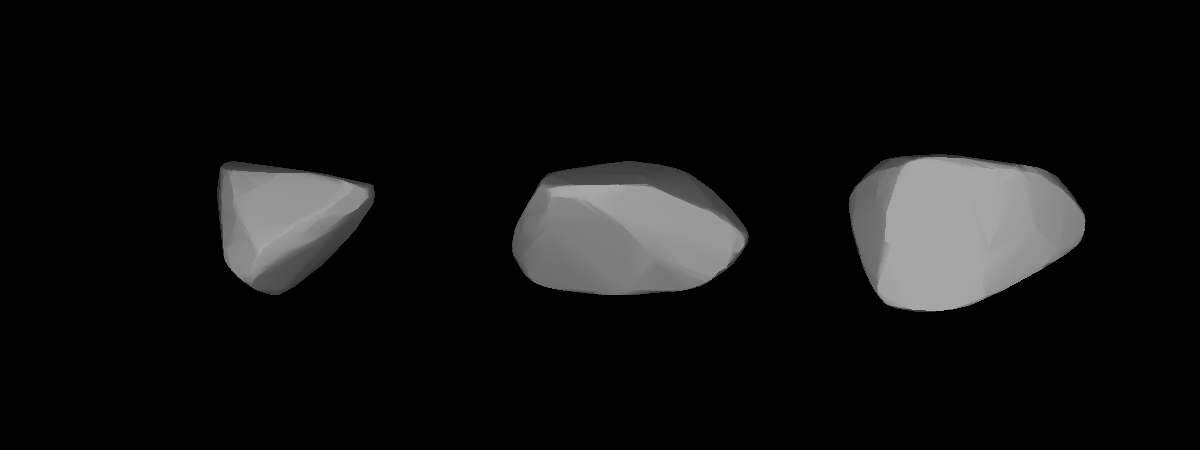
- Lightcurve based 3D-model of Limpopo

Discovery
- Discovered by: C. Jackson
- Discovery site: Johannesburg Obs.
- Discovery date: 14 June 1936

Designations
- Named after: Limpopo River
- Alternative designations: 1936 LB · 1931 BL; 1937 WJ · 1937 YK; 1947 ND · 1965 OD
- Minor planet category: main-belt · (inner)

Orbital characteristics
- Epoch 16 February 2017 (JD 2457800.5)
- Uncertainty parameter 0
- Observation arc: 85.81 yr (31,341 days)
- Aphelion: 2.7182 AU
- Perihelion: 1.9869 AU
- Semi-major axis: 2.3525 AU
- Eccentricity: 0.1554
- Orbital period (sidereal): 3.61 yr (1,318 days)
- Mean anomaly: 63.865°
- Mean motion: 0° 16^{m} 23.16^{s} / day
- Inclination: 10.020°
- Longitude of ascending node: 254.27°
- Argument of perihelion: 90.817°

Physical characteristics
- Dimensions: 14.844±0.112; 16.358±0.045 km 18.55 km (derived); 18.58±1.4 km 19.35±0.27 km 20.21±0.36 km
- Synodic rotation period: 6.15±0.1 h 6.426±0.003 h 6.647±0.004 h
- Geometric albedo: 0.068±0.011; 0.069±0.003; 0.0742 (derived); 0.0811±0.014; 0.1048±0.0332
- Spectral type: SMASS = Xc · M · X
- Absolute magnitude (H): 11.33±0.82 · 12.0 · 12.1

1490 Limpopo, provisional designation 1936 LB, is a carbonaceous–metallic asteroid from the inner regions of the asteroid belt, approximately 18 kilometers in diameter. It was discovered on 14 June 1936, by English-born South African astronomer Cyril Jackson at Johannesburg Observatory in South Africa. It was named for the Limpopo River.

== Orbit ==
Limpopo orbits the Sun in the inner main-belt at a distance of 2.0–2.7 AU once every 3 years and 7 months (1,318 days). Its orbit has an eccentricity of 0.16 and an inclination of 10° with respect to the ecliptic. The body's observation arc begins 2 weeks prior to its official discovery observation. Its first identification as 1931 BL at Lowell Observatory in 1931 remains unused.

== Rotation period ==
Between August and November 2005, three rotational lightcurves of Limpopo were obtained from photometric observations by French amateur astronomer Laurent Bernasconi, Pedro Sada at the Mexican Monterrey Observatory, and Dicy Saylor at University of Georgia, United States. The lightcurves gave a rotation period between 6.15 and 6.647 hours with a brightness variation of 0.15–0.26 magnitude (U=2-/3/3).

== Diameter and albedo ==
According to the surveys carried out by the Infrared Astronomical Satellite IRAS, the Japanese Akari satellite, and NASA's Wide-field Infrared Survey Explorer with its subsequent NEOWISE mission, Limpopo measures between 14.84 and 20.21 kilometers in diameter and its surface has an albedo between 0.068 and 0.105. The Collaborative Asteroid Lightcurve Link derives an albedo of 0.0742 and a diameter of 18.55 kilometers based on an absolute magnitude of 12.1. The X-type asteroid is also classified as a metallic M-type by WISE and as a carbonaceous intermediate Xc-type in the SMASS taxonomy.

== Naming ==
This minor planet was named after the Limpopo River, which rises in central southern Africa, and flows through Botswana, Mozambique, South Africa and Zimbabwe into the Indian Ocean. The official naming citation was published by the Minor Planet Center in April 1953 (M.P.C. 909).
