= 1243 Pamela =

Main-belt asteroid

Discovery
- Discovered by: C. Jackson
- Discovery site: Johannesburg Obs.
- Discovery date: 7 May 1932

Designations
- Named after: Pamela Jackson (discoverer's daughter)
- Alternative designations: 1932 JE · 1929 XD; 1934 VL · 1951 AN; 1954 JO
- Minor planet category: main-belt · (outer) background

Orbital characteristics
- Epoch 4 September 2017 (JD 2458000.5)
- Uncertainty parameter 0
- Observation arc: 85.66 yr (31,287 days)
- Aphelion: 3.2409 AU
- Perihelion: 2.9512 AU
- Semi-major axis: 3.0960 AU
- Eccentricity: 0.0468
- Orbital period (sidereal): 5.45 yr (1,990 days)
- Mean anomaly: 165.56°
- Mean motion: 0° 10^{m} 51.24^{s} / day
- Inclination: 13.286°
- Longitude of ascending node: 245.68°
- Argument of perihelion: 56.586°

Physical characteristics
- Dimensions: 66.11±23.05 km 69.883±0.420 km 69.991±1.389 km 70.06 km (derived); 70.07±5.9 km 70.25±1.00 km 70.97±20.63 km 76.42±0.67 km
- Synodic rotation period: 26.00±0.01 h 26.0±0.1 h 26±0.5 h 26.017±0.003 h (Note: Lightcurve plot of 1243 Pamela, Palmer Divide Observatory, B. D. Warner (1999). Rotation period 26.017±0.003 hours with a brightness amplitude of 0.49±0.03 mag. Summary figures at the LCDB.)
- Geometric albedo: 0.040±0.005; 0.04±0.02; 0.04±0.06; 0.0474 (derived); 0.048±0.002; 0.0483±0.009; 0.0484±0.0102
- Spectral type: C · C (assumed)
- Absolute magnitude (H): 9.60 · 9.68 · 9.70 · 9.71 · 9.90±0.29

1243 Pamela, provisional designation 1932 JE, is a carbonaceous background asteroid from the outer regions of the asteroid belt, approximately 70 kilometers in diameter. It was discovered on 7 May 1932, by South African astronomer Cyril Jackson at the Union Observatory in Johnannesburg. The asteroid was named for Pamela Jackson, daughter of the discoverer.

== Orbit and classification ==
Pamela is a non-family asteroid from the main belt's background population. It orbits the Sun in the outer main-belt at a distance of 3.0–3.2 AU once every 5 years and 5 months (1,990 days; semi-major axis of 3.10 AU). Its orbit has an eccentricity of 0.05 and an inclination of 13° with respect to the ecliptic.

The asteroid was first observed at Lowell Observatory in November 1929. The body's observation arc begins at Johannesburg in April 1932, or one month prior to its official discovery observation.

== Physical characteristics ==
Pamela has been characterized as a carbonaceous C-type asteroid by Pan-STARRS photometric survey.

=== Rotation period ===
In October 1999, a first rotational lightcurve of Pamela was obtained from photometric observations by Brian Warner at his Palmer Divide Observatory in Colorado, United States. Lightcurve analysis gave a rotation period of 26.017 hours with a brightness amplitude of 0.49 magnitude (U=2). Other lightcurves were taken by the Spanish amateur group OBAS in 2015 (U=2), as well as by René Roy and Stéphane Charbonnel in France, and Roberto Crippa and Federico Manzini at Sozzago Astronomical Station (A12) in Piedmont, Italy, between 2005 and 2010 (U=2/1/2/2-).

=== Diameter and albedo ===
According to the surveys carried out by the Infrared Astronomical Satellite IRAS, the Japanese Akari satellite and the NEOWISE mission of NASA's Wide-field Infrared Survey Explorer, Pamela measures between 66.11 and 76.42 kilometers in diameter and its surface has an albedo between 0.040 and 0.0484.

The Collaborative Asteroid Lightcurve Link derives an albedo of 0.0474 and a diameter of 70.06 kilometers based on an absolute magnitude of 9.7.

== Naming ==
This minor planet was named after Cyril Jackson's daughter, Pamela Jackson. The official naming citation was mentioned in The Names of the Minor Planets by Paul Herget in 1955 (H 114).
