= 1467 Mashona =

Asteroid

Discovery
- Discovered by: C. Jackson
- Discovery site: Johannesburg Obs.
- Discovery date: 30 July 1938

Designations
- Named after: Shona people (Mashona) (natives of Mashonaland)
- Alternative designations: 1938 OE · 1930 DL; 1936 DK · 1936 FA_{1} 1948 EG · A923 CB
- Minor planet category: main-belt · (outer)

Orbital characteristics
- Epoch 4 September 2017 (JD 2458000.5)
- Uncertainty parameter 0
- Observation arc: 94.41 yr (34,483 days)
- Aphelion: 3.8268 AU
- Perihelion: 2.9485 AU
- Semi-major axis: 3.3877 AU
- Eccentricity: 0.1296
- Orbital period (sidereal): 6.24 yr (2,277 days)
- Mean anomaly: 255.30°
- Mean motion: 0° 9^{m} 29.16^{s} / day
- Inclination: 21.910°
- Longitude of ascending node: 326.50°
- Argument of perihelion: 349.55°

Physical characteristics
- Mean diameter: 89.160±0.728 km 90.93±28.77 km 95.08±1.30 km 104.119±1.062 km 107.54 km (calculated)
- Mass: (7.5±7.5)×10^{17} kg (Note: Calculated from its standard gravitational parameter GM = 0.05±0.05 km^{3}/s^{2}.) (SB441)
- Mean density: 1.2–2.0 g/cm^{3} (calculated)
- Synodic rotation period: 9.740±0.0029 h 9.744±0.001 h 9.76 h
- Geometric albedo: 0.05±0.03; 0.057 (assumed); 0.0609±0.0111; 0.074±0.002; 0.083±0.014
- Spectral type: Tholen = GC; B–V = 0.743; U–B = 0.373
- Absolute magnitude (H): 8.515±0.001 (R); 8.57

1467 Mashona, provisional designation 1938 OE, is a rare-type carbonaceous asteroid from the outer regions of the asteroid belt, approximately 100 kilometers in diameter, making it one of the top 200 largest asteroids currently known to exist. It was discovered on 30 July 1938, by South African astronomer Cyril Jackson at the Johannesburg Observatory in South Africa. It was later named after the native Shona people of Zimbabwe.

== Classification and orbit ==
Mashona orbits the Sun in the outer main-belt at a distance of 2.9–3.8 AU once every 6 years and 3 months (2,277 days). Its orbit has an eccentricity of 0.13 and an inclination of 22° with respect to the ecliptic. It is a member of the Cybele asteroid group.

In February 1923, it was first identified as 1923 CB at Heidelberg Observatory in Germany. The body's observation arc begins at Johannesburg, 5 days after its official discovery observation.

Mashona was the highest numbered asteroid used in calculating the future orbit of 101955 Bennu.

== Physical characteristics ==
In the Tholen classification, Mashona is a rare GC-type, a spectral type that transitions between the common C and rare G-type asteroids.

=== Lightcurves ===
Until April 2010, three rotational lightcurves of Mashona have been obtained from photometric observations. Lightcurve analysis gave a well-defined rotation period between 9.74 and 9.76 hours with a brightness amplitude varying from 0.24 to 0.31 magnitude (U=3/2/3).

=== Diameter and albedo ===
According to the surveys carried out by the Japanese Akari satellite and NASA's Wide-field Infrared Survey Explorer with its subsequent NEOWISE mission, Mashona measures between 89.160 and 104.119 kilometers in diameter and its surface has an albedo between 0.05 and 0.083. The Collaborative Asteroid Lightcurve Link assumes a standard albedo for carbonaceous asteroids of 0.057 and calculates a diameter of 107.54 kilometers based on an absolute magnitude of 8.57. Among nearly half a million asteroids, Mashona belongs to the 200 largest bodies.

== Naming ==
This minor planet was named for the Shona people (Mashona), natives of Mashonaland in Zimbabwe, then Rhodesia. The official naming citation was published by the Minor Planet Center in April 1953 (M.P.C. 909).
