= 1784 Benguella =

Main-belt asteroid

Discovery
- Discovered by: C. Jackson
- Discovery site: Johannesburg Obs.
- Discovery date: 30 June 1935

Designations
- Named after: Benguela (city in Angola)
- Alternative designations: 1935 MG · 1938 EX; 1950 ON · 1950 QP; 1951 YQ · 1953 FT; 1957 JF · 1957 MH; 1968 HY · 1969 UU_{1}
- Minor planet category: main-belt · (inner) background

Orbital characteristics
- Epoch 27 April 2019 (JD 2458600.5)
- Uncertainty parameter 0
- Observation arc: 83.31 yr (30,430 d)
- Aphelion: 2.7242 AU
- Perihelion: 2.0858 AU
- Semi-major axis: 2.4050 AU
- Eccentricity: 0.1327
- Orbital period (sidereal): 3.73 yr (1,362 d)
- Mean anomaly: 174.06°
- Mean motion: 0° 15^{m} 51.48^{s} / day
- Inclination: 1.4727°
- Longitude of ascending node: 95.271°
- Argument of perihelion: 184.89°

Physical characteristics
- Mean diameter: 10.480±0.100 km 11.80±0.41 km 16.68±1.3 km
- Geometric albedo: 0.0763±0.014; 0.156±0.012; 0.237±0.045
- Absolute magnitude (H): 12.2; 12.30

1784 Benguella, provisional designation 1935 MG, is a background asteroid from the inner regions of the asteroid belt, approximately 12 kilometers (7.5 miles) in diameter. It was discovered by South African astronomer Cyril Jackson at the Johannesburg Observatory on 30 June 1935. It was named for the city of Benguela in Angola. The low-numbered asteroid has been studied poorly.

== Orbit and classification ==
According to modern HCM-analyses, Benguella is a non-family asteroid from the main belt's background population. It orbits the Sun in the inner asteroid belt at a distance of 2.1–2.7 AU once every 3 years and 9 months (1,362 days; semi-major axis of 2.41 AU). Its orbit has an eccentricity of 0.13 and an inclination of 1° with respect to the ecliptic. The body's observation arc begins with its official discovery observation at Johannesburg in June 1935.

== Naming ==
This minor planet was named after Angola's city and chief port Benguela (São Felipe de Benguela), formerly spelled Benguella. The official naming citation was published by the Minor Planet Center on 1 February 1980 (M.P.C. 5183).

== Physical characteristics ==
Benguella's spectral type is unknown, with no assumptions possible based on the asteroid's albedo (see below)

As of 2018, no rotational lightcurve of Benguella has been obtained from photometric observations. The body's rotation period, pole and shape remain unknown. According to the surveys carried out by the Infrared Astronomical Satellite IRAS, the Japanese Akari satellite and the NEOWISE mission of NASA's Wide-field Infrared Survey Explorer, Benguella measures between 10.48 and 16.68 kilometers in diameter and its surface has an albedo between 0.076 and 0.24.
