= 2865 Laurel =

Main-belt asteroid

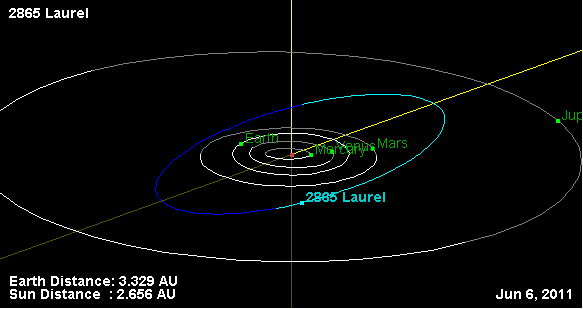
- 2865 Laurel orbit, and his position on 06 Jun 2011 (NASA Orbit Viewer applet)

Discovery
- Discovered by: C. Jackson
- Discovery site: Johannesburg Obs.
- Discovery date: 31 July 1935

Designations
- Named after: Stan Laurel (film comedian)
- Alternative designations: 1935 OK · 1939 PA; 1947 NF · 1951 ML; 1972 QH
- Minor planet category: main-belt · (middle); Maria

Orbital characteristics
- Epoch 4 September 2017 (JD 2458000.5)
- Uncertainty parameter 0
- Observation arc: 81.62 yr (29,810 days)
- Aphelion: 2.7406 AU
- Perihelion: 2.3812 AU
- Semi-major axis: 2.5609 AU
- Eccentricity: 0.0702
- Orbital period (sidereal): 4.10 yr (1,497 days)
- Mean anomaly: 71.330°
- Mean motion: 0° 14^{m} 25.8^{s} / day
- Inclination: 14.294°
- Longitude of ascending node: 321.79°
- Argument of perihelion: 293.35°

Physical characteristics
- Dimensions: 14.73±1.2 km (IRAS:3); 14.79 km (derived); 18.83±0.73 km 24.99±0.37 km
- Synodic rotation period: 21.5±0.3 h
- Geometric albedo: 0.094±0.014; 0.142±0.013; 0.2242±0.043 (IRAS:3); 0.2438 (derived)
- Spectral type: S
- Absolute magnitude (H): 11.20 · 11.24±0.30 · 11.3 · 11.40

2865 Laurel, provisional designation 1935 OK, is a stony Marian asteroid from the middle region of the asteroid belt, approximately 15 kilometers in diameter. It was discovered by English-born South African astronomer Cyril Jackson at Johannesburg Observatory on 31 July 1935. The asteroid was named after movie comedian Stan Laurel.

== Orbit and classification ==
Laurel orbits the Sun in the central main-belt at a distance of 2.4–2.7 AU once every 4 years and 1 month (1,497 days). Its orbit has an eccentricity of 0.07 and an inclination of 14° with respect to the ecliptic. No precoveries were taken and the asteroid's observation arc begins with its discovery observation in 1935.

== Physical characteristics ==
Laurel has been characterized as a common S-type asteroid by PanSTARRS' photometric survey.

=== Rotation period ===
A rotational lightcurve for this asteroid was obtained from photometric observations by French amateur astronomer Pierre Antonini in September 2005. It gave a longer than average rotation period of 21.5±0.3 hours with a brightness variation of 0.15 in magnitude (U=2).

=== Diameter and albedo ===
According to the space-based surveys carried out by the Infrared Astronomical Satellite IRAS, the Japanese Akari satellite, and NASA's Wide-field Infrared Survey Explorer with its subsequent NEOWISE mission, the asteroid measures between 14.7 and 25.0 kilometers in diameter and its surface has an albedo between 0.09 and 0.22. The Collaborative Asteroid Lightcurve Link agrees with IRAS and derives an albedo of 0.24 and a diameter 14.8 kilometers.

== Naming ==
This minor planet was named after English-born slapstick film comedian Stan Laurel (1890–1965). Together with Oliver Hardy (1892–1957), who was honored with the main-belt asteroid 2866 Hardy, they formed the first great comedy duo in Classical Hollywood cinema. The official naming citation was published by the Minor Planet Center on 1 September 1993 (M.P.C. 22496), based on a suggestion by Gareth V. Williams and others.
