= 1116 Catriona =

Main-belt asteroid

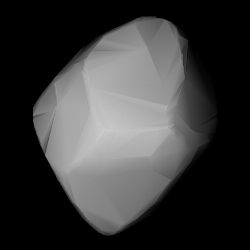
- Shape model of Catriona from its lightcurve

Discovery
- Discovered by: C. Jackson
- Discovery site: Johannesburg Obs.
- Discovery date: 5 April 1929

Designations
- Named after: Catriona (novel by Robert Louis Stevenson)
- Alternative designations: 1929 GD · 1926 RQ; A908 AC
- Minor planet category: main-belt · (outer); background

Orbital characteristics
- Epoch 4 September 2017 (JD 2458000.5)
- Uncertainty parameter 0
- Observation arc: 109.01 yr (39,815 days)
- Aphelion: 3.5946 AU
- Perihelion: 2.2522 AU
- Semi-major axis: 2.9234 AU
- Eccentricity: 0.2296
- Orbital period (sidereal): 5.00 yr (1,826 days)
- Mean anomaly: 348.27°
- Mean motion: 0° 11^{m} 49.92^{s} / day
- Inclination: 16.523°
- Longitude of ascending node: 356.52°
- Argument of perihelion: 82.666°

Physical characteristics
- Dimensions: 36.71±0.53 km 38.741±0.281 km 39.02 km (derived); 39.04 km 39.12±0.7 km 41.010±0.396 km
- Synodic rotation period: 8.83±0.01 h 8.832 h (Note: CALL (2011): anonymous lightcurve submitted to Collaborative Asteroid Lightcurve Link. Rotation period 8.832 hours with a brightness amplitude of 0.10 mag. Summary figures at Collaborative Asteroid Lightcurve Link (CALL)) (Note: Menke (2011): rotation period 8.832 hours with a brightness amplitude of 0.10 mag. Summary figures at Collaborative Asteroid Lightcurve Link (CALL)); 10.49 h 12.06 h (Note: Denchev (1999; b) web: rotation period 12.06 hours with a brightness amplitude of 0.20 mag. Summary figures at Collaborative Asteroid Lightcurve Link (CALL))
- Geometric albedo: 0.1395 (derived); 0.1397±0.0214; 0.1419; 0.1522±0.006; 0.155±0.025; 0.175±0.006
- Spectral type: C
- Absolute magnitude (H): 9.70 · 9.78 · 9.8

1116 Catriona (prov. designation: 1929 GD) is a carbonaceous asteroid from the outer regions of the asteroid belt, approximately 39 kilometers (24 miles) in diameter. It was discovered on 5 April 1929 by South African astronomer Cyril Jackson at the Union Observatory in Johannesburg. The asteroid was likely named after the 1893-novel Catriona by Robert Louis Stevenson.

== Classification and orbit ==
Catriona is not a member of any identified asteroid family. It orbits the Sun in the outer main belt at a distance of 2.3–3.6 AU once every 5.00 years (1,826 days). Its orbit has an eccentricity of 0.23 and an inclination of 17° with respect to the ecliptic. The body's observation arc begins with its official discovery observation at Johannesburg.

== Naming ==
This minor planet was probably named after Catriona, the 1893-novel by Robert Louis Stevenson (1850–1894), who was a Scottish poet, novelist and travel writer. The naming citation is based on Lutz Schmadel's research including feedback from R. Bremer.

== Physical characteristics ==
Catriona is an assumed carbonaceous C-type asteroid.

=== Rotation period ===
In December 2003, the best-rated rotational lightcurve of Catriona was obtained from photometric observations by American astronomer John Menke at his Menke Observatory in Barnesville, Maryland (no obs. code). Lightcurve analysis gave a well-defined rotation period of 8.83 hours with a notably low brightness variation of 0.09 magnitude, indicative of a spheroidal shape (U=3). Additional photometric observations gave a concurring period of 8.832 hours, while others gave a longer period of 10.49 and 12.06 hours (U=2/2/2/2).

=== Diameter and albedo ===
According to observations by astronomers at the Rozhen Observatory in Bulgaria, as well as the surveys carried out by the Infrared Astronomical Satellite IRAS, the Japanese Akari satellite and the NEOWISE mission of NASA's Wide-field Infrared Survey Explorer, Catriona measures between 36.71 and 41.010 kilometers in diameter and its surface has an albedo between 0.1397 and 0.175.

The Collaborative Asteroid Lightcurve Link derives an albedo of 0.1395 and a diameter of 39.02 kilometers based on an absolute magnitude of 9.8.
