= 1248 Jugurtha =

Main-belt asteroid

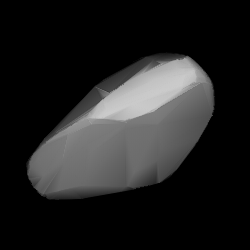
- Shape model of Jugurtha from its lightcurve

Discovery
- Discovered by: C. Jackson
- Discovery site: Johannesburg Obs.
- Discovery date: 1 September 1932

Designations
- Pronunciation: /dʒʊˈɡɜːrθə/
- Named after: Jugurtha (King of Numidia)
- Alternative designations: 1932 RO · 1930 DU; A901 VE · A915 XB
- Minor planet category: main-belt · (middle); background

Orbital characteristics
- Epoch 27 April 2019 (JD 2458600.5)
- Uncertainty parameter 0
- Observation arc: 116.94 yr (42,713 d)
- Aphelion: 2.7671 AU
- Perihelion: 2.6769 AU
- Semi-major axis: 2.7220 AU
- Eccentricity: 0.0166
- Orbital period (sidereal): 4.49 yr (1,640 d)
- Mean anomaly: 32.971°
- Mean motion: 0° 13^{m} 10.2^{s} / day
- Inclination: 9.1387°
- Longitude of ascending node: 79.381°
- Argument of perihelion: 345.85°

Physical characteristics
- Mean diameter: 27.46±1.04 km 28.468±0.193 km 30.47±0.45 km 33.559±0.209 km
- Synodic rotation period: 12.190±0.002 h
- Geometric albedo: 0.2073; 0.257; 0.269; 0.282
- Spectral type: SMASS = S
- Absolute magnitude (H): 9.70; 9.80; 9.9

1248 Jugurtha (prov. designation: 1932 RO) is a stony background asteroid from the central regions of the asteroid belt, approximately 29 kilometers (18 miles) in diameter. Discovered by Cyril Jackson at the Union Observatory in 1932, the asteroid was named after Jugurtha, the ancient North African king of Numidia. The S-type asteroid is likely elongated in shape and has a rotation period of 12.9 hours.

== Discovery ==
Jugurtha was discovered on 1 September 1932, by South African astronomer Cyril Jackson at the Union Observatory in Johannesburg. On 29 September 1932, it was independently determined by Soviet astronomer Grigory Neujmin at the Simeiz Observatory on the Crimean peninsula. The Minor Planet Center only recognizes the first discoverer.

== Orbit and classification ==
Jugurtha is a non-family asteroid from the main belt's background population. It orbits the Sun in the central asteroid belt at a distance of 2.7–2.8 AU once every 4 years and 6 months (1,640 days; semi-major axis of 2.72 AU). Its orbit has an eccentricity of 0.02 and an inclination of 9° with respect to the ecliptic. The body's observation arc begins with its first observation as A901 VE at Heidelberg Observatory in November 1901, nearly 31 years prior to its official discovery, .

== Naming ==
This minor planet was named after Jugurtha (160–104 BC), a king of Numidia in North Africa, opposed to and defeated by Rome in the Jugurthine War (112–106 BC). The official naming citation was mentioned in The Names of the Minor Planets by Paul Herget in 1955 (H 115).

== Physical characteristics ==
In the SMASS classification, Jugurtha is a common, stony S-type asteroid.

=== Rotation period ===
Several rotational lightcurves of Jugurtha have been obtained from photometric observations since 2001. (Note: Lightcurve plot of (1248) Jugurtha, Antelope Hills Observatory. rotation period 12.1897±0.0001 hours. Summary figures at the LCDB) Analysis of the best-rated lightcurve gave a rotation period of 12.190±0.002 hours with a brightness amplitude between 0.70 and 1.40 magnitude (U=3), indicative of an elongated, non-spherical shape. A modeled lightcurve, using photometric data from the Lowell Photometric Database, gave a concurring period of 12.19047 hours, as well as a spin axis of (254.0°, −89.0°) in ecliptic coordinates (λ, β).

=== Diameter and albedo ===
According to the surveys carried out by the Japanese Akari satellite and the NEOWISE mission of NASA's Wide-field Infrared Survey Explorer, Jugurtha measures between 27.46 and 33.559 kilometers in diameter and its surface has an albedo between 0.2073 and 0.282. The Collaborative Asteroid Lightcurve Link assumes a standard albedo for stony asteroids of 0.20 and calculates a diameter of 31.12 kilometers based on an absolute magnitude of 9.9.
