= 1397 Umtata =

Main-belt asteroid

Discovery
- Discovered by: C. Jackson
- Discovery site: Johannesburg Obs.
- Discovery date: 9 August 1936

Designations
- Named after: Mthatha (South-African town)
- Alternative designations: 1936 PG · 1931 GK; 1945 QF · 1945 RC; 1948 EB_{1}
- Minor planet category: main-belt · (middle) background

Orbital characteristics
- Epoch 4 September 2017 (JD 2458000.5)
- Uncertainty parameter 0
- Observation arc: 81.14 yr (29,638 days)
- Aphelion: 3.3646 AU
- Perihelion: 1.9967 AU
- Semi-major axis: 2.6806 AU
- Eccentricity: 0.2551
- Orbital period (sidereal): 4.39 yr (1,603 days)
- Mean anomaly: 173.37°
- Mean motion: 0° 13^{m} 28.56^{s} / day
- Inclination: 3.5109°
- Longitude of ascending node: 77.437°
- Argument of perihelion: 206.53°

Physical characteristics
- Dimensions: 20.35±0.30 km 20.40 km (derived); 20.798±0.292 km 22.895±0.285 km
- Synodic rotation period: 30 h
- Geometric albedo: 0.0794±0.0140; 0.084±0.046; 0.10 (assumed); 0.112±0.004
- Spectral type: S/C; B–V = 0.690; U–B = 0.210
- Absolute magnitude (H): 11.47 · 11.57

1397 Umtata, provisional designation 1936 PG, is an asteroid from the background population of the asteroid belt's central region, approximately 21 kilometers in diameter. It was discovered by South-African astronomer Cyril Jackson at the Union Observatory in Johannesburg on 9 August 1936. The asteroid was named after the South-African town of Mthatha, formerly known as Umtata.

== Orbit and classification ==
Umtata is a non-family asteroid of the main belt's background population. It orbits the Sun in the central asteroid belt at a distance of 2.0–3.4 AU once every 4 years and 5 months (1,603 days). Its orbit has an eccentricity of 0.26 and an inclination of 4° with respect to the ecliptic.

The asteroid was first identified as 1931 GK at the Lowell Observatory in April 1931. The body's observation arc begins with its official discovery observation at Johannesburg.

== Physical characteristics ==
The asteroid's spectral type is unknown. The Lightcurve Data Base assumes an S- or C-type to be equally likely, using an average albedo of 0.10 (see below). (Note: Asteroid Lightcurve Data Base (LCDB) – 2. Taxonomic Class, orbital class, and albedo. The LCDB generically assumes a S/C-type with an albedo of 0.10 for non-family main belt asteroids with a semi-major axis between 2.6 and 2.7.)

=== Rotation period ===
In May 1984, a rotational lightcurve of Umtata was obtained from photometric observations by American astronomer Richard Binzel. Analysis of the fragmentary lightcurve gave a rotation period of 30 hours with a brightness amplitude of 0.13 magnitude (U=1). As of 2017, no secure period has been obtained.

=== Diameter and albedo ===
According to the surveys carried out by the Japanese Akari satellite and the NEOWISE mission of NASA's Wide-field Infrared Survey Explorer, Umtata measures between 20.35 and 22.895 kilometers in diameter and its surface has an albedo between 0.0794 and 0.112.

The Collaborative Asteroid Lightcurve Link assumes an albedo of 0.10 – a compromise value between the stony (0.20) and carbonaceous asteroid's, both abundant in the main belt's central region – and derives a diameter of 20.40 kilometers based on an absolute magnitude of 11.57.

== Naming ==
This minor planet was named after South-African town of Mthatha, formerly known as Umtata. It is the capital town of the OR Tambo District Municipality and the King Sabata Dalindyebo Local Municipality. The official naming citation was published by the Minor Planet Center in April 1953 (M.P.C. 909).
