= 1196 Sheba =

Main-belt asteroid

Discovery
- Discovered by: C. Jackson
- Discovery site: Johannesburg Obs.
- Discovery date: 21 May 1931

Designations
- Pronunciation: /ʃiːbə/
- Named after: Queen of Sheba (Biblical figure)
- Alternative designations: 1931 KE · A912 BB
- Minor planet category: main-belt · (middle)

Orbital characteristics
- Epoch 16 February 2017 (JD 2457800.5)
- Uncertainty parameter 0
- Observation arc: 105.12 yr (38,396 days)
- Aphelion: 3.1303 AU
- Perihelion: 2.1806 AU
- Semi-major axis: 2.6554 AU
- Eccentricity: 0.1788
- Orbital period (sidereal): 4.33 yr (1,581 days)
- Mean anomaly: 198.47°
- Mean motion: 0° 13^{m} 40.08^{s} / day
- Inclination: 17.652°
- Longitude of ascending node: 100.84°
- Argument of perihelion: 262.18°

Physical characteristics
- Dimensions: 25.274±0.443 km
- Synodic rotation period: 6.319 h
- Geometric albedo: 0.218±0.024
- Spectral type: SMASS = X · X
- Absolute magnitude (H): 10.26 (IRAS:19)

1196 Sheba, provisional designation 1931 KE, is a metallic asteroid from the middle region of the asteroid belt, approximately 25 kilometers in diameter. It was discovered on 21 May 1931 by astronomer Cyril Jackson at Johannesburg Observatory, South Africa.

Sheba is a metallic X-type asteroid and orbits the Sun at a distance of 2.2–3.1 AU once every 4 years and 4 months (1,581 days). Its orbit has an eccentricity of 0.18 and an inclination of 18° with respect to the ecliptic. It was first identified as A912 BB at Heidelberg Observatory in 1912. The body's observation arc, however, begins at Johannesburg, four months after its official discovery observation.

This minor planet was named after the biblical Queen of Sheba, who visited King Solomon. Naming citation was first published by Paul Herget in The Names of the Minor Planets in 1955 (H 111).
