= 1355 Magoeba =

Hungaria asteroid and a suspected contact-binary

Discovery
- Discovered by: C. Jackson
- Discovery site: Johannesburg Obs.
- Discovery date: 30 April 1935

Designations
- Named after: Magoeba (South African chief)
- Alternative designations: 1935 HE
- Minor planet category: main-belt · Hungaria

Orbital characteristics
- Epoch 4 September 2017 (JD 2458000.5)
- Uncertainty parameter 0
- Observation arc: 81.71 yr (29,843 days)
- Aphelion: 1.9363 AU
- Perihelion: 1.7707 AU
- Semi-major axis: 1.8535 AU
- Eccentricity: 0.0447
- Orbital period (sidereal): 2.52 yr (922 days)
- Mean anomaly: 245.86°
- Mean motion: 0° 23^{m} 26.16^{s} / day
- Inclination: 22.827°
- Longitude of ascending node: 225.25°
- Argument of perihelion: 340.40°

Physical characteristics
- Dimensions: 4.276±0.170 km 4.828±0.094 km 5.96 km (calculated)
- Synodic rotation period: 2.9712±0.0003 h 2.972±0.002 h 2.975±0.002 h 5.946±0.005 h 5.99±0.05 h (Note: Lightcurve plot of (1355) Magoeba, Palmer Divide Observatory, B. D. Warner (2011)); 31.65±0.05 h 32.9±0.1 h
- Geometric albedo: 0.267±0.095; 0.3 (assumed); 0.4663±0.0824; 0.582±0.049
- Spectral type: Tholen = X · M · E · X B–V = 0.713; U–B = 0.255
- Absolute magnitude (H): 13.02±0.22 · 13.05

1355 Magoeba, provisional designation 1935 HE, is a Hungaria asteroid and a suspected contact-binary from the innermost regions of the asteroid belt, approximately 5 kilometers in diameter. It was discovered on 30 April 1935, by English-born, South African astronomer Cyril Jackson at the Johannesburg Observatory in South Africa. The asteroid is named for Magoeba, a tribal chief in the South African Transvaal Province.

== Orbit and classification ==
Magoeba is a member of the Hungaria family, which forms the innermost dense concentration of asteroids in the Solar System. It orbits the Sun in the inner main-belt at a distance of 1.8–1.9 AU once every 2 years and 6 months (922 days). Its orbit has an eccentricity of 0.04 and an inclination of 23° with respect to the ecliptic. The first precovery was taken at Nice Observatory just 3 day prior to its official discovery. The body's observation arc begins at Johannesburg the night after its discovery observation.

== Physical characteristics ==
=== Lightcurves ===
Between 2006 and 2014, several rotational lightcurves of Magoeba were obtained by American astronomer Brian Warner at the CS3–Palmer Divide Station (U82) in California. Lightcurve analysis of the photometric observations taken during the asteroid's 2014-apparition gave a rotation period of 2.971 hours with a brightness variation of 0.09 magnitude (U=3). (Note: Light-curve plots of (1355) Magoeba from the 2013-observation and from the 2014-observation, published by the Center for Solar System Studies (CS3) in Landers, California.)

Previously derived periods varied strongly (5.99 and 31.65 hours) with alternative period solutions (U=2-/2/2). The Observation were taken at the Palmer Divide Observatory (716) in Colorado (see video in § External links). It is now suspected that this discrepancy might be caused by the presence of an asteroid moon that orbits Magoeba with a period of 15.05 hours.

=== Diameter and albedo ===
According to the survey carried out by NASA's Wide-field Infrared Survey Explorer with its subsequent NEOWISE mission, Magoeba measures 4.276 and 4.828 kilometers in diameter, and its surface has an albedo of 0.582 and 0.466, respectively, while a polarimetric study of Hungaria asteroids found a lower albedo of 0.267. The Collaborative Asteroid Lightcurve Link assumes an albedo of 0.30 – a compromise value between 0.4 and 0.2, corresponding to the Hungaria asteroids both as family and orbital group – and calculates a diameter of 5.96 kilometers with an absolute magnitude of 13.05.

=== Spectral type ===
In the Tholen taxonomy, Magoeba is an X-type asteroid, which can be further divided into the bright E, the metallic M and the carbonaceous P classes, with similar spectra but very different inferred mineralogies. It has both been classified as an E-type asteroid by the WISE/NEOWISE mission, and as a M-type asteroid by a dedicated spectroscopic survey at the Argentinian Lencito Complex, respectively.

== Naming ==
This minor planet was named for Magoeba, a native chief of the North Transvaal in South Africa. The official naming citation was published by the Minor Planet Center in April 1953 (M.P.C. 908).
