= 1194 Aletta =

Main-belt asteroid

Discovery
- Discovered by: C. Jackson
- Discovery site: Johannesburg Obs.
- Discovery date: 13 May 1931

Designations
- Named after: Aletta Jackson (discoverer's wife)
- Alternative designations: 1931 JG · 1946 KC; 1962 SB
- Minor planet category: main-belt · (outer)

Orbital characteristics
- Epoch 16 February 2017 (JD 2457800.5)
- Uncertainty parameter 0
- Observation arc: 85.07 yr (31,072 days)
- Aphelion: 3.1812 AU
- Perihelion: 2.6452 AU
- Semi-major axis: 2.9132 AU
- Eccentricity: 0.0920
- Orbital period (sidereal): 4.97 yr (1,816 days)
- Mean anomaly: 138.73°
- Mean motion: 0° 11^{m} 53.52^{s} / day
- Inclination: 10.870°
- Longitude of ascending node: 291.32°
- Argument of perihelion: 243.18°

Physical characteristics
- Dimensions: 41.358±0.191 km 42.67±0.77 km 46.371±1.188 km 55.22±20.92 km 55.23 km (derived); 55.39±1.4 km
- Synodic rotation period: 19.7±0.1 h 20.39±0.01 h 20.3903±0.2170 h
- Geometric albedo: 0.03±0.03; 0.0333 (derived); 0.0375±0.0065; 0.0479±0.003; 0.085±0.004; 0.087±0.011
- Spectral type: C
- Absolute magnitude (H): 10.2 · 10.5 · 10.6 · 10.644±0.001 (R)

1194 Aletta, provisional designation 1931 JG, is a carbonaceous asteroid from the outer region of the asteroid belt, approximately 55 kilometers in diameter. It was discovered on 13 May 1931, by South African astronomer Cyril Jackson at Johannesburg Observatory in South Africa. It was later named after the discoverer's wife Aletta Jackson.

== Classification and orbit ==
Aletta is a dark C-type asteroid and orbits the Sun at a distance of 2.6–3.2 AU once every 4 years and 12 months (1,816 days). Its orbit has an eccentricity of 0.09 and an inclination of 11° with respect to the ecliptic. The body's observation arc begins at Johannesburg, one week after its official discovery observation. No precoveries were taken and no prior identifications were made.

== Physical characteristics ==
=== Diameter and albedo ===
According to the surveys carried out by the Infrared Astronomical Satellite IRAS, the Japanese Akari satellite, and NASA's Wide-field Infrared Survey Explorer with its subsequent NEOWISE mission, Aletta measures between 41.358 and 55.39 kilometers in diameter, and its surface has an albedo between 0.03 and 0.87. The Collaborative Asteroid Lightcurve Link derives an albedo of 0.0333 and a diameter of 55.23 kilometers based on an absolute magnitude of 10.6.

=== Rotation period ===
In November 2007, American astronomer James W. Brinsfield obtained the first ever lightcurve of Aletta with period of 19.7 hours and a brightness variation of 0.32 magnitude at Via Capote Observatory (U=2). Two more lightcurves were obtained by Australian astronomer Julian Oey at Leura/Kingsgrove Observatory in March 2010, and by the Survey conducted at the Palomar Transient Factory, California, in October 2012. Lightcurve analysis gave a concurring rotation period of 20.39 and 20.3903 hours with an amplitude of 0.28 and 0.27 magnitude, respectively (U=2+/2).

== Naming ==
The discoverer named this minor planet for his wife, Aletta Jackson (née Maria Aletta Lessing). Naming citation was first mentioned in The Names of the Minor Planets by Paul Herget in 1955 (H 111).
