= 1195 Orangia =

Main-belt asteroid

Discovery
- Discovered by: C. Jackson
- Discovery site: Johannesburg Obs.
- Discovery date: 24 May 1931

Designations
- Named after: Orange Free State Province (in South Africa)
- Alternative designations: 1931 KD · 1948 LB; 1972 QA
- Minor planet category: main-belt · (inner); Flora

Orbital characteristics
- Epoch 4 September 2017 (JD 2458000.5)
- Uncertainty parameter 0
- Observation arc: 85.55 yr (31,248 days)
- Aphelion: 2.7110 AU
- Perihelion: 1.8048 AU
- Semi-major axis: 2.2579 AU
- Eccentricity: 0.2007
- Orbital period (sidereal): 3.39 yr (1,239 days)
- Mean anomaly: 150.46°
- Mean motion: 0° 17^{m} 25.8^{s} / day
- Inclination: 7.1906°
- Longitude of ascending node: 281.26°
- Argument of perihelion: 328.27°

Physical characteristics
- Dimensions: 5.90 km (calculated); 6.258±0.604 km
- Synodic rotation period: 6.167±0.0012 h
- Geometric albedo: 0.237±0.053; 0.24 (assumed)
- Spectral type: S
- Absolute magnitude (H): 12.864±0.002 (R) · 13.2 · 13.31 · 13.60±0.32

1195 Orangia, provisional designation 1931 KD, is a stony Florian asteroid from the inner regions of the asteroid belt, approximately 6 kilometers in diameter. It was discovered on 24 May 1931, by South African astronomer Cyril Jackson at the Union Observatory in Johannesburg, South Africa. It was named after the Orange Free State Province.

== Orbit and classification ==
Orangia is a member of the Flora family, one of the largest families of stony asteroids. It orbits the Sun in the inner main-belt at a distance of 1.8–2.7 AU once every 3 years and 5 months (1,239 days). Its orbit has an eccentricity of 0.20 and an inclination of 7° with respect to the ecliptic. The asteroid's observation arc begins at Johannesburg, two weeks after its official discovery observation.

== Physical characteristics ==
=== Lightcurve ===
In November 2010, a rotational lightcurve of Orangia was obtained from photometric observations in the R-band by astronomers at the Palomar Transient Factory in California. Lightcurve analysis gave a rotation period of 6.167 hours with a brightness amplitude of 0.20 magnitude (U=2).

=== Diameter and albedo ===
According to the survey carried out by the NEOWISE mission of NASA's Wide-field Infrared Survey Explorer, Orangia measures 6.258 kilometers in diameter and its surface has an albedo of 0.237, while the Collaborative Asteroid Lightcurve Link assumes an albedo of 0.24 – derived from 8 Flora, the largest member and namesake of the Flora family – and calculates a diameter of 5.90 kilometers using an absolute magnitude of 13.31.

== Naming ==
This minor planet was named in honor of former South African Orange Free State Province that existed from 1910 to 1994. The official naming citation was also mentioned in Paul Herget's The Names of the Minor Planets in 1955 (H 111).
