= 1506 Xosa =

Main-belt asteroid

Discovery
- Discovered by: C. Jackson
- Discovery site: Johannesburg Obs.
- Discovery date: 15 May 1939

Designations
- Named after: Xhosa people (Bantu ethnic group)
- Alternative designations: 1939 JC
- Minor planet category: main-belt · (middle)

Orbital characteristics
- Epoch 4 September 2017 (JD 2458000.5)
- Uncertainty parameter 0
- Observation arc: 77.97 yr (28,477 days)
- Aphelion: 3.2408 AU
- Perihelion: 1.9052 AU
- Semi-major axis: 2.5730 AU
- Eccentricity: 0.2595
- Orbital period (sidereal): 4.13 yr (1,507 days)
- Mean anomaly: 338.30°
- Mean motion: 0° 14^{m} 19.68^{s} / day
- Inclination: 12.550°
- Longitude of ascending node: 234.53°
- Argument of perihelion: 45.154°

Physical characteristics
- Dimensions: 11.83 km (calculated); 13.963±0.702 km
- Synodic rotation period: 5.90±0.01 h (dated); 5.9±0.1 h (dated); 292±3 h 298.0659±5.5273 h
- Geometric albedo: 0.157±0.037; 0.20 (assumed)
- Spectral type: S
- Absolute magnitude (H): 11.820±0.003 (R) · 11.90 · 12.0

1506 Xosa (provisional designation 1939 JC) is a stony asteroid and slow rotator from the middle region of the asteroid belt, approximately 13 kilometers in diameter. It was discovered on 15 May 1939, by English-born, South African astronomer Cyril Jackson at the Johannesburg Observatory in South Africa. It is named for the Xhosa people.

== Orbit and classification ==
The S-type asteroid orbits the Sun at a distance of 1.9–3.2 AU once every 4 years and 2 months (1,507 days). Its orbit has an eccentricity of 0.26 and an inclination of 13° with respect to the ecliptic. Xosa's observation arc begins with its official discovery observation, as no precoveries were taken and no prior identifications were made.

== Physical characteristics ==
=== Slow rotator ===
In Fall 2010, lightcurve photometry by Brian Warner and at the Palomar Transient Factory revealed that Xosa is a slow rotator with a notably long rotation period of 292 and 298 hours and a brightness variation of 0.70 and 0.42 magnitude, respectively (U=2+/2). It also seems to be in a non-principal axis rotation (NPAR), colloquially called as "tumbling". However, observations are insufficient to determine the body's tumbling, or to rule out a non-tumbling state (T0). These observations superseded previous periods obtained in 2001 and 2005 (U=1/1).

=== Diameter and albedo ===
According to the survey carried out by NASA's Wide-field Infrared Survey Explorer with its subsequent NEOWISE mission, Xosa measures 13.96 kilometers in diameter and its surface has an albedo of 0.157, while the Collaborative Asteroid Lightcurve Link assumes a standard albedo for stony asteroids of 0.20 and calculates a diameter of 11.83 kilometers using an absolute magnitude of 12.0.

== Naming ==
This minor planet was named after the Xhosa (formerly spelled "Xosa"), a Bantu ethnic group of native people in south-east South Africa, and who came into early contact with the white settlers. The official naming citation was published by the Minor Planet Center in April 1953 (M.P.C. 909).
