= P-type asteroid =

Classification of asteroids

P-type (primitive-type) asteroids have low albedo and a featureless reddish spectrum. It has been suggested that they have a composition of organic-rich silicates, carbon and anhydrous silicates, possibly with water ice in their interior. P-type asteroids are found in the outer asteroid belt and beyond. There are about 33 known P-type asteroids, depending on the classification, including 46 Hestia, 65 Cybele, 76 Freia, 87 Sylvia, 153 Hilda, 476 Hedwig and, in some classifications, 107 Camilla.

== Taxonomy ==
An early system of asteroid taxonomy was established in 1975 from the doctoral thesis work of David J. Tholen. This was based upon observations of a group of 110 asteroids. The U-type classification was used as a miscellaneous class for asteroids with unusual spectra that did not fit into the C and S-type asteroid classifications. In 1976, some of these U-type asteroids with unusual moderate albedo levels were labeled as M-type.

Around 1981, an offshoot of the M-type asteroid branch appeared for minor planets that have spectra that are indistinguishable from M-type, but that also have low albedo not consistent with the M type. These were initially labeled X-type asteroids, then type DM (dark M) or PM (pseudo-M), before acquiring their own unique classification as P-type asteroids (where the P indicates "pseudo-M").

== Properties ==
The P-type asteroids are some of the darkest objects in the Solar System with very low albedos (pv<0.1) and appear to be organic-rich, similar to carbonaceous chondrites. Their colors are somewhat redder than S-type asteroids and they do not show spectral features. The red coloration may be caused by organic compounds related to kerogen. The reflectance spectra of P-type asteroids can be reproduced through a combination of 31% CI and 49% CM groups of carbonaceous chondrite meteorites, plus 20% Tagish lake meteorites, after undergoing thermal metamorphism and space weathering.

The density of the only two well-characterized P-type asteroids, 87 Sylvia and 107 Camilla P-type asteroids appears to be low, at 1.3 g/cm^{3} – lower even than C-type asteroids. It is not clear what this tells us about their compositions. Both Sylvia and Camilla have moons and indications that they have been disrupted, but they are also quite massive, at over ×10^{19} kg, and so are unlikely to have much internal porosity affecting their densities.

The outer part of the main asteroid belt beyond 2.6 AU from the Sun is dominated by low-albedo C, D and P-type asteroids. These are primitive asteroids that may have had their materials chemically altered by liquid water. There are 33 known P-type asteroids. In addition to this, P-type asteroids are thought to be found in the outer asteroid belt and beyond. The distribution of P-type asteroids peaks at an orbital distance of 4 AU.

== See also ==
- Asteroid spectral types
