= USS Patricia =

Ocean liner that became a United States troop transport ship

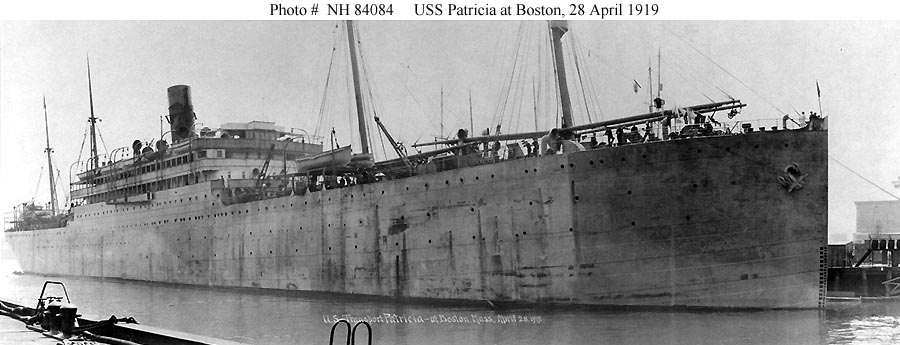
- USS Patricia at Boston, 28 April 1919

History
- Namesake: Patricia
- Owner: 1898: Hamburg America Line; 1919: Shipping Controller
- Operator: early 1919: United States Navy; late 1919: Ellerman Lines
- Port of registry: 1899: (German Empire) Hamburg; (United States); (United Kingdom)
- Route: 1899: Hamburg – New York
- Builder: AG Vulcan Stettin
- Launched: 20 February 1899
- Acquired: by US Government, 26 March 1919
- Commissioned: into US Navy, 28 March 1919
- Decommissioned: from US navy, 13 September 1919
- Maiden voyage: 7–19 May 1899
- Reclassified: troop ship, 1914
- Refit: 1910
- Stricken: from US Navy, 13 September 1919
- Identification: code letters: 1899: RLGQ; US Navy, early 1919: GJBQ; late 1919: NIVC; by 1913: wireless call sign DDP
- Fate: Scrapped 1921

General characteristics
- Class & type: P-class ocean liner
- Tonnage: 1899: 13,023 GRT; 1910: 14,466 GRT, 9,073 NRT
- Length: 560.3 ft (170.8 m)
- Beam: 62.3 ft (19.0 m)
- Draft: 14 ft 9 in (4.50 m)
- Depth: 37.1 ft (11.3 m)
- Decks: 4
- Installed power: 719 NHP
- Propulsion: 2 × quadruple-expansion engines; 2 × propellers
- Speed: 14 knots (26 km/h)
- Capacity: passengers: 1899: 162 1st class, 184 2nd class, 2,143 3rd class; 1910: 408 2nd class, 2,143 3rd class
- Troops: almost 3,000
- Complement: as troop ship, 569
- Sensors & processing systems: submarine signalling
- Notes: sister ships: Pennsylvania, Pretoria, Graf Waldersee

USS Patricia was a transatlantic liner that was launched in Germany in 1899 and spent most of her career with Hamburg America Line (HAPAG). She was the last to be built of a class of four HAPAG sister ships that came from shipyards in the United Kingdom and Germany between 1896 and 1899.

In 1919, HAPAG surrendered Patricia to the United States as part of Germany's World War I reparations to the Allies, and she was used to repatriate American Expeditionary Forces troops from Europe.

Later, in 1919, she was transferred from the US government to the UK Shipping Controller. She was scrapped in England in 1921.

== Building ==
Patricia was the last to be built of HAPAG's four P-class ocean liners, all of which were completed in the second half of the 1890s. Harland and Wolff launched the first of them, Pennsylvania, in 1896. Blohm & Voss launched Pretoria in 1897 and Graf Waldersee in 1898.

AG Vulcan Stettin launched Patricia on 20 February 1899 and completed her that May. Her registered length was 560.3 ft (170.8 m), her beam was 62.3 ft (19.0 m) and her depth was 37.1 ft (11.3 m). As built, she was assessed as 13,023 GRT. She had berths for 162 passengers in first class, 184 in second class and 2,143 in third class.

Patricia had twin propellers, each driven by a four-cylinder quadruple-expansion steam engine. Between them her twin engines were rated at 719 NHP and gave her a speed of about 14 knots (26 km/h).

HAPAG registered Patricia in Hamburg. Her code letters were RLGQ.

== German service ==
In March 1899 HAPAG announced that the regular route for Patricia and her three sisters would be Hamburg – Cherbourg – Plymouth – New York. HAPAG also announced a reduction in its transatlantic fares. On Patricia and her sisters the rate for a first class cabin was reduced from $65 to $50, and that for a second class cabin was reduced from $47.50 to $38.

On 7 May 1899 Patricia began her maiden voyage from Hamburg via Boulogne to New York. She reached New York on 19 May, and was opened for public inspection at Hoboken Terminal, New Jersey on 25 May.

In the Elbe on 2 January 1910 Patricia rammed the lightvessel Elbe V, sinking her. Afterwards Patricia was refitted as a two-class ship. First class was abolished, and second class berths were increased to 408. The refit increased her tonnages to 14,466 GRT and 9,073 NRT.

By 1913 Patricia was equipped for wireless telegraphy. Her call sign was DDP.

On 27 November 1913 Patricia began what became her last voyage from Hamburg to New York. On 12 January 1914 the German government requisitioned her as a troop ship to the Jiaozhou Bay Leased Territory on the coast of China.

== US service ==
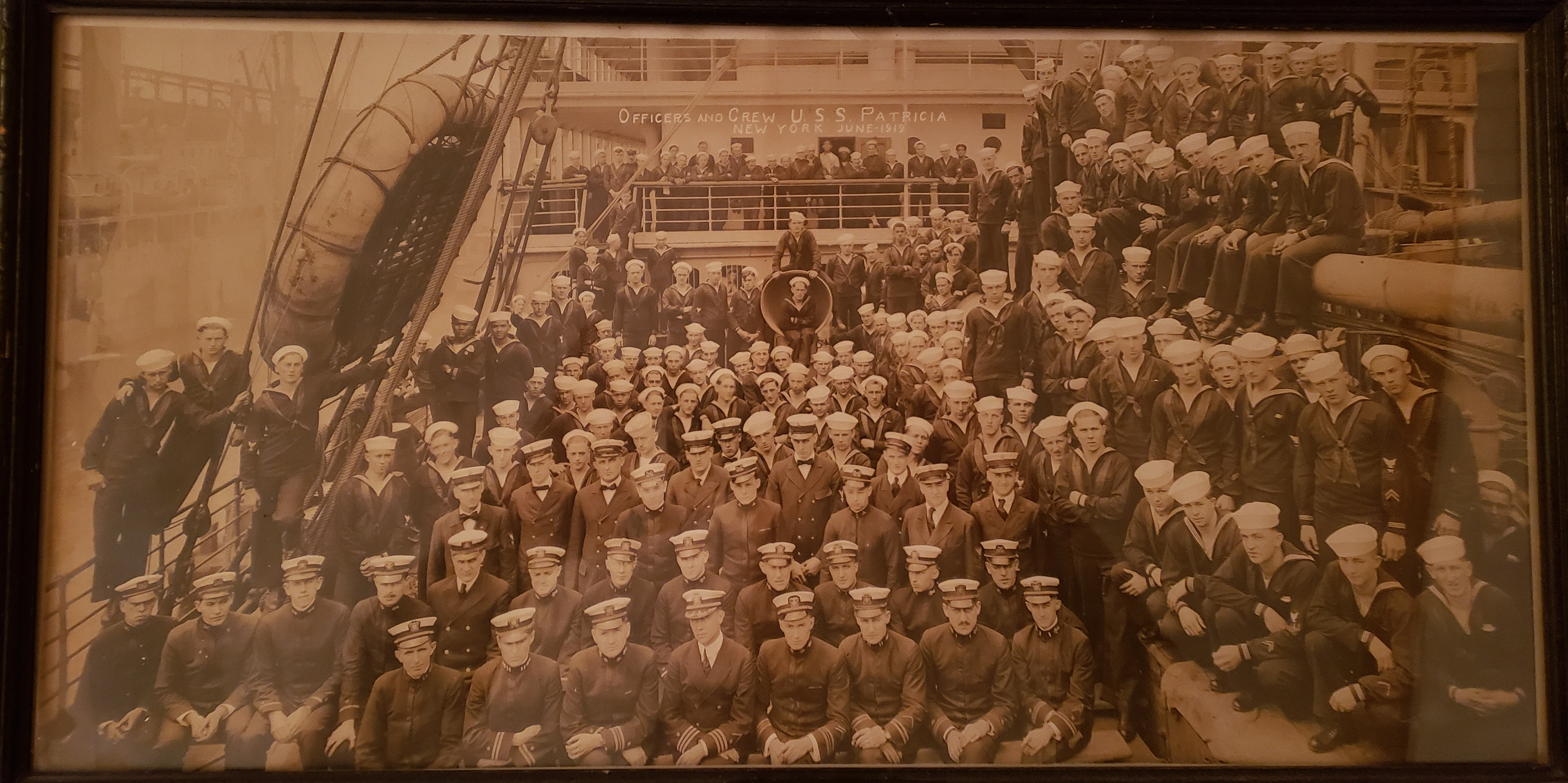
Patricia's US Navy crew in June 1919

On 26 March 1919, HAPAG surrendered Patricia to the United States Government. On 28 March at Cowes, Isle of Wight she was commissioned into the United States Navy, but she was not given a pennant number. Lt Cdr CC Windsor, United StatesNRF, was appointed to command her.

On 30 March 1919 Patricia left Brest, France carrying members of the American Expeditionary Forces home to New York. This was the first of four voyages that Patricia made from France to the US, in which she repatriated a total of 8,865 servicemen.

In one voyage in April 1919 Patricia brought home from Brest to Boston almost 3,000 troops of the 26th Division, including the 102nd and 103rd machine gun battalions. On 15 April 1919, while Patricia was in mid-Atlantic, Julius Fischer, a HAPAG agent, locked himself in one of her state rooms and set fire to it by causing an electrical short-circuit. Members of her crew broke down the door, put out the fire and arrested Fischer. Other HAPAG agents said that Fischer was mentally unwell at the time. Patricia reached Boston on 17 April.

On 4 June 1919 Patricia reached Hoboken carrying 2,847 members of the 36th Infantry Division. They included 150 Native American scouts.

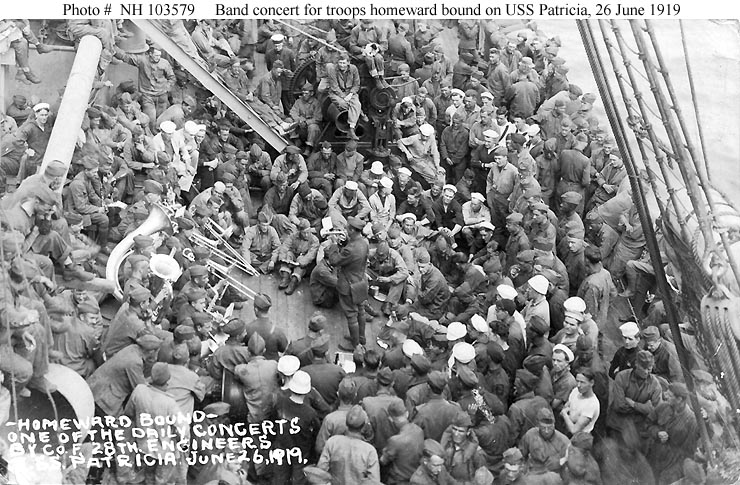
A brass band playing to a crowd of troops aboard Patricia, 26 June 1919

On the night of 11–12 June 1919, as Patricia was leaving New York for France, the cargo ship Redondo accidentally rammed Patricia's sister ship Graf Waldersee in fog about 86 nautical miles (160 km) off Sandy Hook, New Jersey. Graf Waldersee reported 6 feet (2 m) of water in her engine room, and Redondo shipped water in her forward hold. Patricia received Graf Waldersee's wireless distress signal and came to assist.

Patricia took off Graf Waldersee's passengers and half of her crew and then took the damaged liner in tow. Late on the morning of 12 June Graf Waldersee's crew beached her on a sandbar on Long Island. Graf Waldersee was refloated on the afternoon of 14 June and four tugs towed her to Brooklyn Navy Yard.

== UK service ==
On 6 September 1919 it was announced that as soon as the United States Department of War had no further use for ships seized from German ports under the Treaty of Versailles, they would be returned to the Inter-Allied Council. The council would decide whether to return the ships to their German owners or redistribute them among the Allies. Patricia was among the ships affected, along with Cap Finisterre, Imperator, Kaiserin Auguste Victoria, Mobile, Pretoria, Prinz Friedrich Wilhelm, Santa Elena and Zeppelin.

On 18 September 1919 Patricia was decommissioned from the US Navy and transferred to the UK Shipping Controller, which appointed Ellerman's Wilson Line to manage her. In November 1921 she arrived at Blyth, Northumberland to be scrapped.
