= SS Graf Waldersee =

Ocean liner (1898–1922)

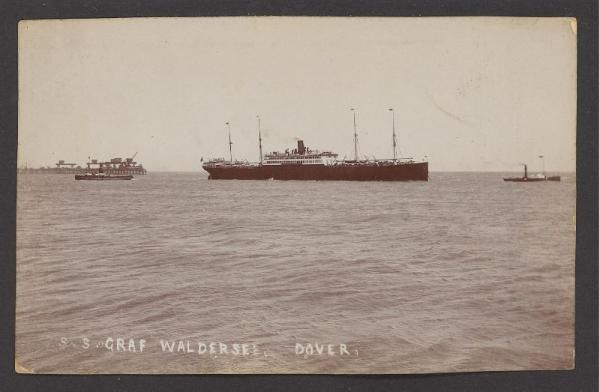
- Graf Waldersee off Dover about 1922

History
- Name: Graf Waldersee
- Namesake: Alfred von Waldersee
- Owner: 1898–1919: HAPAG; 1919: US Shipping Board; 1919–22: UK Shipping Controller
- Operator: Mar–Nov 1919: US Navy; 1919–22: P&O SN Co
- Port of registry: (German Empire) Hamburg; (United States); (United Kingdom)
- Route: 1899: Hamburg – Cherbourg – Plymouth – New York
- Builder: Blohm & Voss, Hamburg
- Yard number: 131
- Launched: 10 December 1898
- Completed: 18 March 1899
- Commissioned: into US Navy, 28 March 1919
- Decommissioned: from US Navy, 25 November 1919
- Maiden voyage: 2–15 April 1899
- Reclassified: troop ship, 1919
- Refit: 1910
- Identification: code letters RLGB; by 1913: wireless call sign DDW; 1919: US Navy pennant number ID-4040; 1919: UK official number 144411
- Fate: Scrapped 1922

General characteristics
- Class & type: P-class ocean liner
- Tonnage: as built: 12,830 GRT, 8,157 NRT
- Displacement: 25,000 tons
- Length: 561.2 ft (171.1 m)
- Beam: 62.2 ft (19.0 m)
- Depth: 37.7 ft (11.5 m)
- Installed power: 714 NHP
- Propulsion: 2 × quadruple-expansion engines; 2 × propellers
- Speed: 14 knots (26 km/h)
- Capacity: passengers: 1899: 162 1st class, 184 2nd class, 2,200 3rd class; 1910: 408 2nd class, 2,310 3rd class
- Troops: at least 1,526 troops
- Complement: in US Navy: 553
- Crew: in civilian service: 250
- Sensors & processing systems: submarine signalling
- Notes: sister ships: Pennsylvania, Pretoria, Patricia

SS Graf Waldersee was a transatlantic liner that was launched in Germany in 1898 and spent most of her career with Hamburg America Line (HAPAG). She was the third of a class of four HAPAG sister ships that were built in the United Kingdom and Germany between 1896 and 1899.

In 1919 HAPAG surrendered Graf Waldersee to the United States as part of Germany's World War I reparations to the Allies. She became the United States Navy troop ship USS Graf Waldersee (ID-4040) and was used to repatriate American Expeditionary Forces troops from Europe.

At the end of 1919 Graf Waldersee was transferred from the United States Shipping Board to the UK Shipping Controller. She was scrapped in Germany in 1922.

== Building ==
Graf Waldersee was the third of HAPAG's four P-class ocean liners, which were built in the 1890s. Harland and Wolff launched the first of them, Pennsylvania, in 1896. Blohm & Voss launched Pretoria in 1897 and AG Vulcan Stettin launched Patricia in 1899.

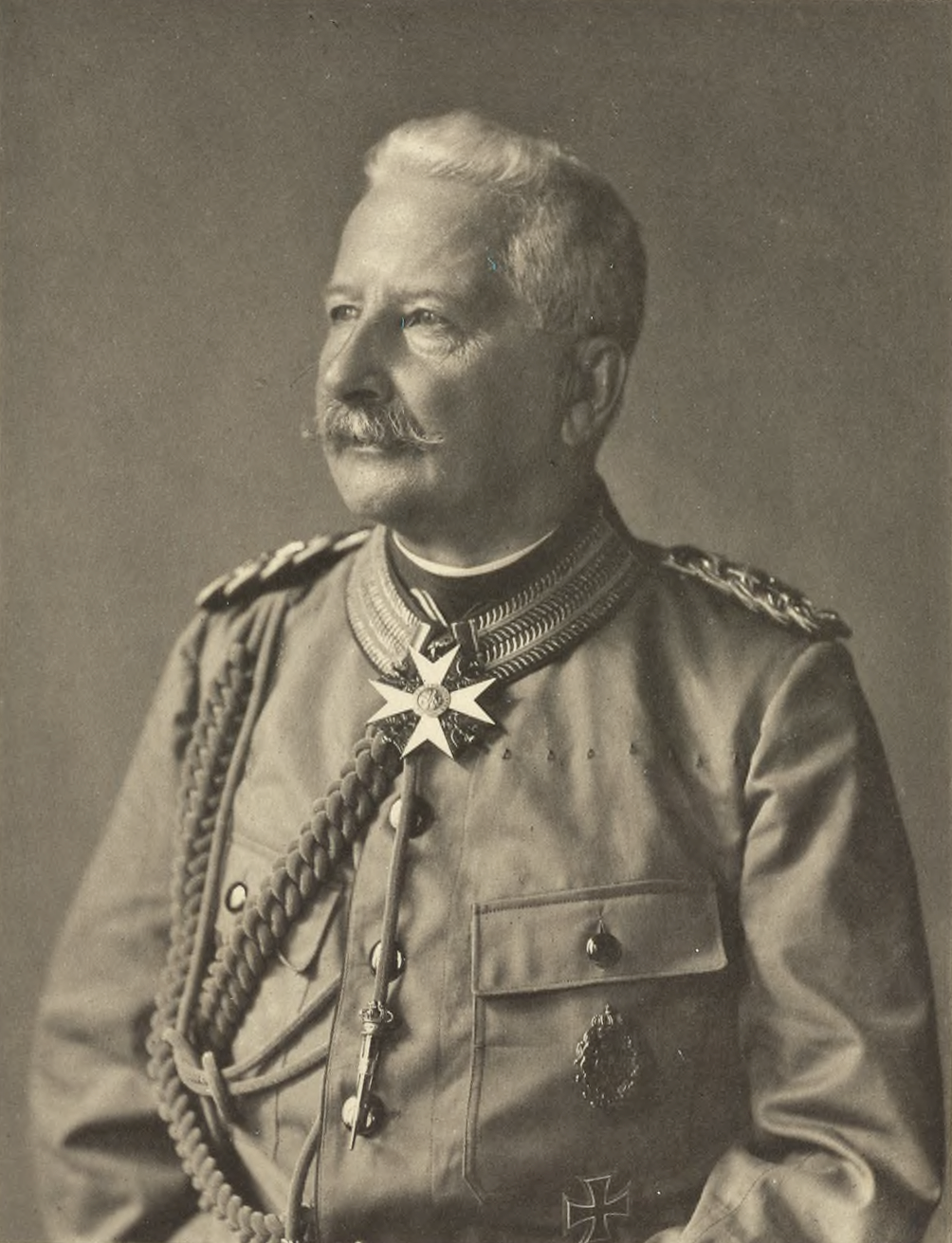
Alfred, Graf von Waldersee, after whom the ship was named

Blohm & Voss also built Graf Waldersee. She was launched on 10 December 1898 and completed on 18 March 1899. She was laid down as Pavia, but was launched as Graf Waldersee to honour Alfred, Graf von Waldersee, who until 1891 had been Chief of the German General Staff and who in 1898 had been made Inspector-General of the German Third Army.

Graf Waldersee's registered length was 561.2 ft (171.1 m), her beam was 62.2 ft (19.0 m) and her depth was 37.7 ft (11.5 m). As built, her tonnages were 12,830 GRT and 8,157 NRT. She had berths for 162 passengers in first class, 184 in second class and 2,200 in third class.

Graf Waldersee had twin propellers, each driven by a four-cylinder quadruple-expansion steam engine. Between them her twin engines were rated at 714 NHP and gave her a speed of 14 knots (26 km/h).

HAPAG registered Graf Waldersee in Hamburg. Her code letters were RLGB.

== German service ==
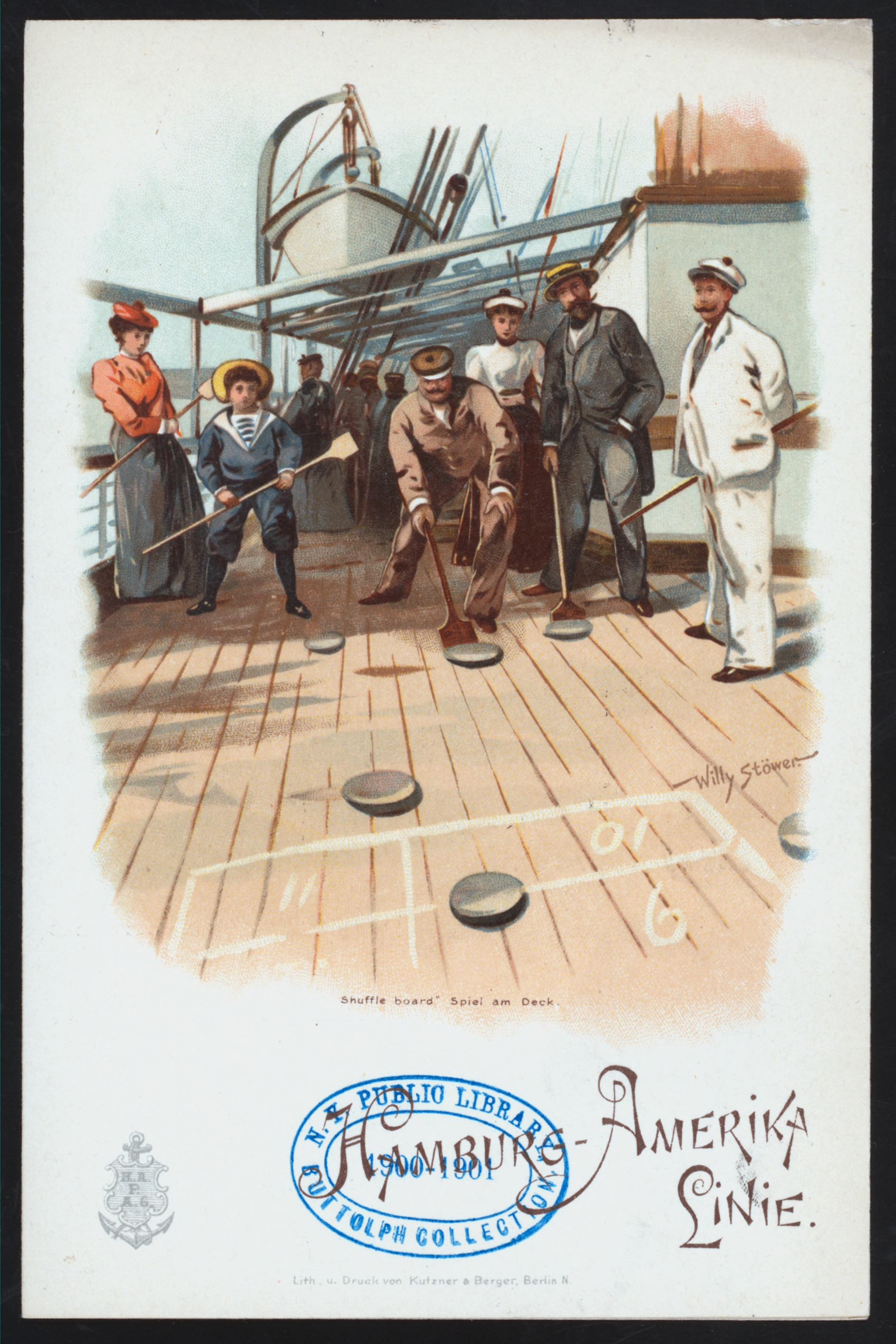
Illustration from a Graf Waldersee dinner menu and concert programme, showing passengers playing shuffleboard on deck

In March 1899 HAPAG announced that the regular route for Graf Waldersee and her three sisters would be Hamburg – Cherbourg – Plymouth – New York. HAPAG also announced a reduction in its transatlantic fares. On Graf Waldersee and her sisters the rate for a first class cabin was reduced from $65 to $50, and that for a second class cabin was reduced from $47.50 to $38.

On 2 April 1899 Graf Waldersee left Hamburg on her maiden voyage via Boulogne to New York. She reached New York on 15 April.

On an eastbound Atlantic crossing in 1901 Graf Waldersee weathered a "hurricane" from 19 to 22 March. She was swamped by heavy seas, several members of her crew were injured, part of her cargo shifted and many of her deck fittings were damaged. She reached Plymouth safely on 28 March.

In early 1907 the Graf Waldersee shipped the Freer Manuscripts I-IV to New York on route to Michigan. They would eventually be donated to the Smithsonian Institution in Washington, DC.

On a westbound crossing in 1908 smallpox broke out among Graf Waldersee's third class passengers. When she reached New York on 14 March, 197 of her 400 third class passengers were quarantined on Hoffman Island.

In 1910 Graf Waldersee was refitted as a two-class ship. First class was abolished, second class was increased to 408 berths and third class to 2,310 berths. The refit increased her tonnage to 13,148 GRT.

By 1913 Graf Waldersee was equipped for wireless telegraphy. Her call sign was DDW.

On the night of 23–24 September 1913 Graf Waldersee collided with the Norwegian steamship Norge in the Elbe. Graf Waldersee was undamaged, but Norge was holed below the waterline and had to be towed to a dock for repair.

== US service ==
On 23 March 1919 HAPAG surrendered Graf Waldersee to the US Government. On the same day she left Bremen with Kaiserin Auguste Victoria. On 3 April her German crew was relieved by a United States Navy Reserve crew at Spithead in England. The US Navy commissioned her as USS Graf Waldersee with the pennant number ID-4040 and made Cdr Lemuel L Stevens her commander.

Graf Waldersee was assigned to the Cruiser and Transport Division of the US Atlantic Fleet. On 7 April she left Brest, France for New York carrying either 1,526 or 1,741 US troops. She made another voyage between Brest and New York from 18 May to 2 June.

On the night of 11–12 June 1919 the cargo ship Redondo accidentally rammed Graf Waldersee in fog about 86 nautical miles (160 km) off Sandy Hook, New Jersey. Graf Waldersee reported 6 feet (2 m) of water in her engine room, and Redondo shipped water in her forward hold. Redondo stood by ready to assist until Graf Waldersee's sister ship Patricia arrived.

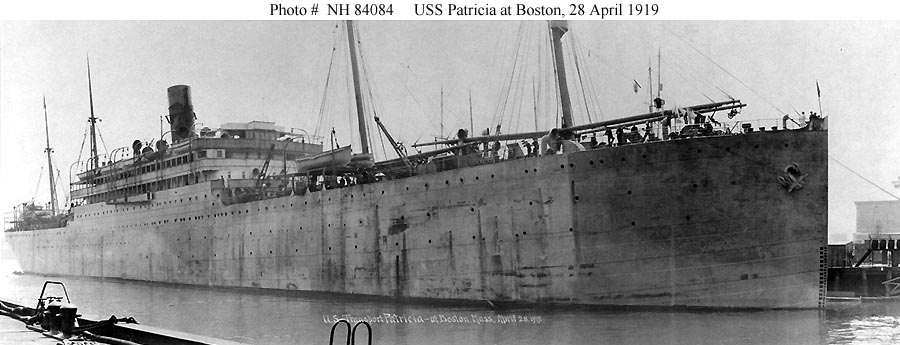
In June 1919 Graf Waldersee was damaged in a collision. Her sister ship Patricia (shown here) rescued her passengers and towed her to safety.

Patricia took off Graf Waldersee's passengers and half of her crew and then took the damaged liner in tow. Late on the morning of 12 June Graf Waldersee's crew beached her on a sandbar on Long Island. Three tugs came to assist, using their pumps to reduce the level of water in Graf Waldersee's engine room. Divers temporarily repaired the hole in her hull with layers of tarpaulin reinforced with planks. She was refloated on the afternoon of 14 June and four tugs towed her to Brooklyn Navy Yard.

From 7 to 30 August Graf Waldersee made another voyage between Brest and New York to repatriate US personnel. On 25 November 1919 at Stapleton, Staten Island the US Navy decommissioned Graf Waldersee and returned her to the US Shipping Board.

== UK service ==
Graf Waldersee was one of eight ships that the US government had seized from Germany but which the UK government also claimed. The others were Cap Finisterre, Imperator, Kaiserin Auguste Victoria, Mobile, Pretoria, Prinz Friedrich Wilhelm and Zeppelin.

In the latter part of 1919 the British Peninsular and Oriental Steam Navigation Company, under contract to the UK Shipping Controller, sent 1,100 officers and men to the US to take over Graf Waldersee, Imperator and Kaiserin Auguste Victoria. They included 35 Goanese lascars who travelled as passengers aboard the White Star Liner Belgic to be cooks and stewards on Graf Waldersee. However, when Belgic reached New York on 17 October, the US Bureau of Immigration detained the lascars on Ellis Island.

On 26 December 1919 President Wilson surrendered seven former German ships, including Graf Waldersee, to the UK in settlement of the dispute between the two allies. The 35 Goanese cooks and stewards who had been detained on Ellis Island since 17 October were finally released to become part of Graf Waldersee's crew.

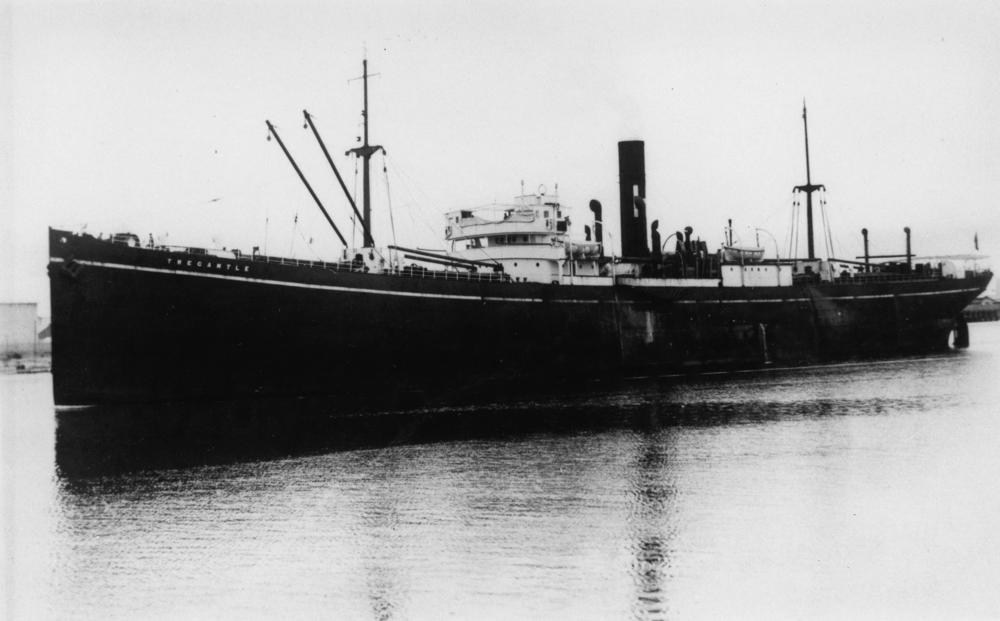
In December 1920 Graf Waldersee collided in the River Thames with two ships and a hulk, including Hain Steamship Co's Tregantle, shown here.

On 4 December 1920 Graf Waldersee broke adrift when under tow in the River Thames. On 6 December she again broke adrift when under tow in the Thames. On this occasion she collided with the cargo ships Tregantle and Fairfield and hulk Sumatra, causing Fairfield to capsize. Graf Waldersee eventually grounded off Gravesend.

In 1921 the Shipping Controller auctioned Graf Waldersee for scrap. Thos. W. Ward bought her and sold her on to Kohlbrandwerft in Hamburg, who scrapped her in 1922.
