= Pretoria (disambiguation) =

Pretoria is South Africa's administrative capital.

Pretoria may also refer to:

== Places ==
- Pretoria Pit disaster, a mining disaster at Westhoughton, Lancashire, UK
- Piazza Pretoria, a square in Palermo, Italy
  - Fontana Pretoria, a monumental fountain located in Piazza Pretoria
- 790 Pretoria, an asteroid

== Ships ==
- Pretoria (schooner barge), privately owned, one of the largest wooden ships ever constructed, launched in 1900 from West Bay, Michigan, US
- USS Pretoria (1897), a United States Navy troop transport commissioned in 1919
- TS Pretoria, a German cargo liner completed in 1936, requisitioned by the UK in 1945 and later renamed the Empire Orwell

== Other ==
- Pretoria (moth), a moth in the family Pyralidae

== See also ==
- Petoria - a fictional place in the Family Guy episode "E. Peterbus Unum" (season 2 episode 25, 2000)
