= 1660 Wood =

FIFA Women's Champions cup 2026

Discovery
- Discovered by: J. A. Bruwer
- Discovery site: Johannesburg Obs.
- Discovery date: 7 April 1953

Designations
- Named after: Harry Edwin Wood (astronomer)
- Alternative designations: 1953 GA · 1931 KL; 1933 YC · 1951 RD_{1} 1955 VQ
- Minor planet category: main-belt · Phocaea

Orbital characteristics
- Epoch 4 September 2017 (JD 2458000.5)
- Uncertainty parameter 0
- Observation arc: 86.05 yr (31,429 days)
- Aphelion: 3.1172 AU
- Perihelion: 1.6726 AU
- Semi-major axis: 2.3949 AU
- Eccentricity: 0.3016
- Orbital period (sidereal): 3.71 yr (1,354 days)
- Mean anomaly: 182.68°
- Mean motion: 0° 15^{m} 57.24^{s} / day
- Inclination: 20.575°
- Longitude of ascending node: 212.94°
- Argument of perihelion: 276.66°

Physical characteristics
- Dimensions: 11.342±0.113 km 12.67 km (calculated)
- Synodic rotation period: 6.8088±0.0002 h 6.8088±0.0004 h 6.8090±0.0002 h
- Geometric albedo: 0.23 (assumed); 0.239±0.035
- Spectral type: SMASS = S · S
- Absolute magnitude (H): 11.32±0.67 · 11.7 · 11.9

1660 Wood, provisional designation 1953 GA, is a stony Phocaea asteroid from the inner regions of the asteroid belt, approximately 12 kilometers in diameter. It was named after British–South African astronomer Harry Edwin Wood.

== Discovery ==
Wood was discovered on 7 April 1953, by South African astronomer Jacobus Bruwer at Johannesburg Observatory in South Africa. It was the second numbered discovery made by Bruwer. He also discovered the minor planets 1658 Innes, 1794 Finsen, and 3284 Niebuhr. The asteroid 1811 Bruwer was named in his honour by the Dutch, Dutch-American astronomer trio of the Palomar–Leiden survey.

== Orbit and classification ==
Wood is a S-type asteroid and member of the Phocaea family (701). It orbits the Sun in the inner main-belt at a distance of 1.7–3.1 AU once every 3 years and 9 months (1,354 days). Its orbit has an eccentricity of 0.30 and an inclination of 21° with respect to the ecliptic. It was first identified as 1931 KL at Lowell Observatory in 1931, extending the body's observation arc by 22 years prior to its official discovery observation.

== Physical characteristics ==
=== Rotation period ===
From January to March 2012, four rotational lightcurves of Wood were obtained from photometric observations taken by astronomers Julian Oey, Kevin Hills, and Xianming Han. Lightcurve analysis gave a concurring rotation period of 6.809 hours with a brightness variation between of 0.14 and 0.26 magnitude (U=3/3/3/2+).

=== Diameter and albedo ===
According to the survey carried out by NASA's Wide-field Infrared Survey Explorer with its subsequent NEOWISE mission, Wood measures 11.34 kilometers in diameter, and its surface has an albedo of 0.239. The Collaborative Asteroid Lightcurve Link assumes an albedo of 0.23 and calculates a diameter of 12.67 kilometers with an absolute magnitude of 11.7.

== Naming ==
This minor planet was named for British–South African astronomer Harry Edwin Wood (1881–1946), who was the second director of the Union Observatory at which the asteroid was discovered, and who had discovered 12 asteroids himself between 1911 and 1928. He had the prime responsibility for the famous Franklin-Adams Star Camera (Franklin-Adams photographic refractor) since its acquisition in 1909 (also see 1925 Franklin-Adams). The official naming citation was published by the Minor Planet Center on 1 July 1972 (M.P.C. 3297).
