= 933 Susi =

Main-base asteroid

Discovery
- Discovered by: K. Reinmuth
- Discovery site: Heidelberg
- Discovery date: 10 February 1927

Designations
- Pronunciation: German: [ˈzuːziː]
- Alternative designations: 1927 CH

Orbital characteristics
- Epoch 31 July 2016 (JD 2457600.5)
- Uncertainty parameter 0
- Observation arc: 88.62 yr (32367 days)
- Aphelion: 2.7604 AU (412.95 Gm)
- Perihelion: 1.9765 AU (295.68 Gm)
- Semi-major axis: 2.3685 AU (354.32 Gm)
- Eccentricity: 0.16548
- Orbital period (sidereal): 3.65 yr (1331.4 d)
- Mean anomaly: 188.793°
- Mean motion: 0° 16^{m} 13.404^{s} / day
- Inclination: 5.5391°
- Longitude of ascending node: 141.483°
- Argument of perihelion: 13.095°

Physical characteristics
- Mean radius: 10.91±0.7 km
- Synodic rotation period: 4.6222 h (0.19259 d)
- Geometric albedo: 0.0707±0.010
- Absolute magnitude (H): 12.5

933 Susi is a minor planet orbiting the Sun.

The object 1911 LX discovered 22 April 1911, by H. E. Wood was named 715 Transvaalia. On 23 April 1920, the object 1920 GZ was discovered and named 933 Susi. In 1928 it was realized that these were one and the same object. The name Transvaalia was kept, and the name and number 933 Susi was reused for the object 1927 CH discovered 10 February 1927, by Karl Reinmuth.
