= SS Pretoria =

A number of steamships have been named Pretoria

- SS Pretoria (1897)
- SS Pretoria (1936)
