= Willem Hendrik van den Bos =

Dutch-South African astronomer

- Born: 25 September 1896; Rotterdam
- Died: 30 March 1974 (aged 77); Johannesburg, South Africa
- Education: Leiden University
- Known for: 2895 double stars discovered
- Scientific career
- Fields: Astronomy
- Workplaces: Union Observatory
- Thesis: Micrometer measurements of double stars (1925)
- Doctoral advisor: Willem de Sitter

Willem Hendrik van den Bos (25 September 1896 – 30 March 1974) was a Dutch astronomer who worked at the Union Observatory in South Africa and became its director in 1941. He discovered nearly 3000 new double stars, made more than 71000 astronomical measurements and compiled a catalogue of Southern hemisphere double stars. He computed the orbits of more than 100 double stars using a method he invented and which later became the accepted standard.

== Biography ==
Van den Bos was born in Rotterdam in 1896. He studied astronomy at Leiden University and worked at the Leiden Observatory. In 1925 he completed his PhD in astronomy under the supervision of Willem de Sitter and was invited by R.T.A. Innes to join the Union Observatory in Johannesburg for a three-year appointment as assistant to the director, H.E. Wood. Innes was eager to have an experienced observer of double-stars to share the workload on the newly erected telescope.

Van den Bos extended his appointment at the Union Observatory indefinitely and in 1941 was appointed Director of the observatory. He retired from the observatory in 1956 but continued his observations both in South Africa and the United States until 1966 when he was forced to stop owing to severe illness.

During the 31 years of his career he discovered 2895 new double stars and made 71929 astronomical measurements. He compiled a catalogue from previous observations of southern hemisphere double stars that was incorporated into the Index Catalog of Visual Double Stars, published in 1963, with the collaboration of H.M. Jeffries and F.M. Greeby of the Lick Observatory, California. The catalogue later became the Washington Double Star Catalog.

In 1926 Van den Bos, in co-operation with Robert T.A. Innes, developed a new method of computing the orbits of double stars, based on the so-called Thiele−Innes elements, and used it to determine the orbits of more than 100 binary stars. Their method became the accepted standard procedure.

== Recognition, memberships, awards ==
- President of the Double Star Commission of the International Astronomical Union for 14 years.
- Royal Danish Academy Gold Medal
- Gill Medal from the Astronomical Society of Southern Africa
- President of the Astronomical Society of Southern Africa in 1943 and 1955
- The 1969 Double-star Colloquium of the International Astronomical Union in Nice was dedicated to Van den Bos.
- The asteroid 1663 van den Bos is named after him, as is the lunar crater van den Bos.
