= 715 Transvaalia =

Main-belt asteroid

Discovery
- Discovered by: H. E. Wood
- Discovery site: Johannesburg Obs.
- Discovery date: 22 April 1911

Designations
- Pronunciation: /trænzˈvɑːliə/
- Alternative designations: 1911 LX

Orbital characteristics
- Epoch 31 July 2016 (JD 2457600.5)
- Uncertainty parameter 0
- Observation arc: 104.91 yr (38318 d)
- Aphelion: 2.9989 AU (448.63 Gm)
- Perihelion: 2.5422 AU (380.31 Gm)
- Semi-major axis: 2.7706 AU (414.48 Gm)
- Eccentricity: 0.082430
- Orbital period (sidereal): 4.61 yr (1684.4 d)
- Mean anomaly: 192.37°
- Mean motion: 0° 12^{m} 49.392^{s} / day
- Inclination: 13.808°
- Longitude of ascending node: 46.109°
- Argument of perihelion: 299.865°

Physical characteristics
- Mean radius: 14.275±1.15 km
- Synodic rotation period: 11.83 h (0.493 d)
- Geometric albedo: 0.2606±0.048
- Absolute magnitude (H): 10.1

715 Transvaalia is a minor planet orbiting the Sun.

The object 1911 LX discovered April 22, 1911, by H. E. Wood was named 715 Transvaalia. It was named after Transvaal, former province of South Africa. On April 23, 1920, the object 1920 GZ was discovered and named 933 Susi. In 1928 it was realized that these were one and the same object. The name Transvaalia was kept, and the name and number 933 Susi was reused for the object 1927 CH discovered February 10, 1927, by Karl Reinmuth. 715 Transvaalia has been observed to occult two stars, both events in 2022.
