= 1925 Franklin-Adams =

Stony main-belt asteroid

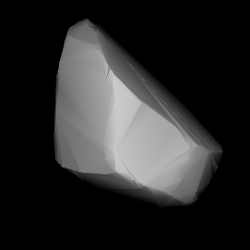
- Franklin-Adams modeled from its lightcurve

Discovery
- Discovered by: H. van Gent
- Discovery site: Johannesburg Obs. (Leiden Southern Station)
- Discovery date: 9 September 1934

Designations
- Named after: John Franklin Adams (British astronomer)
- Alternative designations: 1934 RY · 1969 EP_{1} 1970 KH · 1974 KK
- Minor planet category: main-belt · (middle) background

Orbital characteristics
- Epoch 31 May 2020 (JD 2459000.5)
- Uncertainty parameter 0
- Observation arc: 85.14 yr (31,098 d)
- Aphelion: 2.9989 AU
- Perihelion: 2.1046 AU
- Semi-major axis: 2.5517 AU
- Eccentricity: 0.1752
- Orbital period (sidereal): 4.08 yr (1,489 d)
- Mean anomaly: 11.630°
- Mean motion: 0° 14^{m} 30.48^{s} / day
- Inclination: 7.7371°
- Longitude of ascending node: 113.47°
- Argument of perihelion: 242.08°

Physical characteristics
- Mean diameter: 8.864±0.114 km
- Synodic rotation period: 2.978±0.002 h (Note: Lightcurve plot of 1925 Franklin-Adams with a period of 2.978±0.002 and an amplitude of 0.25 ± 0.02 mag. Observations at the Palmer Divide Observatory by B. D. Warner (2013))
- Geometric albedo: 0.356±0.054
- Spectral type: S (assumed)
- Absolute magnitude (H): 12.0; 12.1

1925 Franklin-Adams (prov. designation: 1934 RY) is a stony background asteroid from the central regions of the asteroid belt, approximately 8.9 kilometers (5.5 miles) in diameter. It was discovered on 9 September 1934, by Dutch astronomer Hendrik van Gent at the Leiden Southern Station, annex to the Johannesburg Observatory in South Africa. The bright asteroid has a short rotation period of less than 3 hours. It was named after British amateur astronomer John Franklin Adams (1843–1912).

== Orbit and classification ==
Franklin-Adams is a non-family asteroid of the main belt's background population when applying the hierarchical clustering method to its proper orbital elements. It orbits the Sun in the central asteroid belt at a distance of 2.1–3.0 AU once every 4 years and 1 month (1,489 days; semi-major axis of 2.55 AU). Its orbit has an eccentricity of 0.18 and an inclination of 8° with respect to the ecliptic. The body's observation arc begins with its official discovery observation at Johannesburg.

== Naming ==
This minor planet named after British amateur astronomer John Franklin Adams (1843–1912), who created one of the earliest detailed, photographic atlases of the complete night sky (the "Franklin-Adams plates" or "charts"). He later donated his 25-cm Franklin-Adams Star Camera (Franklin-Adams photographic refractor) to the Johannesburg Observatory, which lead to the discovery of Proxima Centauri. The official naming citation was published by the Minor Planet Center on 20 December 1983 (M.P.C. 8402). Asteroid 982 Franklina, discovered by South African astronomer Harry Edwin Wood at Johannesburg was also named after him.

== Physical characteristics ==
Franklin-Adams is an assumed stony S-type asteroid with a very high albedo of more than 0.3.

=== Rotation period and poles ===
In January 2005, a rotational lightcurve of Franklin-Adams was obtained from photometric observations by French amateur astronomer René Roy. Lightcurve analysis gave a rotation period of 3.082 hours with a brightness amplitude of 0.23 magnitude (U=2). In March 2010, photometry at the Palomar Transient Factory in California gave a period of 2.979 with an amplitude of 0.32 magnitude (U=2). In January 2013, American astronomer Brian Warner obtained the so-far best rated lightcurve. It gave a period of 2.978 hours and an amplitude of 0.25 magnitude (U=3).

In 2016, an international study modeled a lightcurve with a concurring period of 2.978301 hours and found a spin axis of (277.0°, 57.0°) and (66.0°, 48.0°) in ecliptic coordinates (λ, β) (U=n.a.).

=== Diameter and albedo ===
According to the survey carried out by NASA's Wide-field Infrared Survey Explorer with its subsequent NEOWISE mission, Franklin-Adams measures 8.864 kilometers in diameter and its surface has an unusually high albedo of 0.356, while the Collaborative Asteroid Lightcurve Link assumes a standard albedo for stony asteroids of 0.20 and calculates a diameter of 11.30 kilometers based on an absolute magnitude of 12.1.
