= 982 Franklina =

Main-belt asteroid

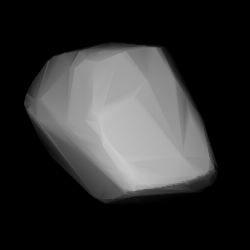
- Modelled shape of Franklina from its lightcurve

Discovery
- Discovered by: H. E. Wood
- Discovery site: Johannesburg Obs.
- Discovery date: 21 May 1922

Designations
- Named after: John Franklin Adams (British astronomer)
- Alternative designations: A922 KF · 1922 MD; 1928 QF · 1938 HG
- Minor planet category: main-belt · (outer) background

Orbital characteristics
- Epoch 31 May 2020 (JD 2459000.5)
- Uncertainty parameter 0
- Observation arc: 91.15 yr (33,291 d)
- Aphelion: 3.7852 AU
- Perihelion: 2.3472 AU
- Semi-major axis: 3.0662 AU
- Eccentricity: 0.2345
- Orbital period (sidereal): 5.37 yr (1,961 d)
- Mean anomaly: 35.422°
- Mean motion: 0° 11^{m} 0.96^{s} / day
- Inclination: 13.657°
- Longitude of ascending node: 299.15°
- Argument of perihelion: 350.82°

Physical characteristics
- Mean diameter: 31.07±0.86 km; 32.47±3.0 km; 33.227±4.627 km
- Synodic rotation period: >16 h (Note: Lightcurve plot of (982) Franklina, Palmer Divide Observatory, by B. D. Warner (2004). Rotation period of at least 16 hours with a brightness amplitude of >0.05 mag. Quality code is 2−. Summary figures at the LCDB.)
- Geometric albedo: 0.1838±0.040; 0.184±0.396; 0.214±0.013
- Spectral type: A (S3OS2-TH); Ld (S3OS2-BB)
- Absolute magnitude (H): 9.9; 10.0

982 Franklina (prov. designation: A922 KF or 1922 MD) is a background asteroid from the outer regions of the asteroid belt, approximately 32 kilometers (20 miles) in diameter. It was discovered on 21 May 1922, by South African astronomer Harry Edwin Wood at the Union Observatory in Johannesburg. The uncommon A/Ld-type asteroid has a rotation period of at least 16 hours. It was named after British amateur astronomer John Franklin Adams (1843–1912).

== Orbit and classification ==
Franklina is a non-family asteroid of the main belt's background population when applying the hierarchical clustering method to its proper orbital elements. It orbits the Sun in the outer asteroid belt at a distance of 2.3–3.8 AU once every 5 years and 4 months (1,961 days; semi-major axis of 3.07 AU). Its orbit has an eccentricity of 0.23 and an inclination of 14° with respect to the ecliptic. The body's first observation was its discovery observation at Johannesburg on 21 May 1922. Its observation arc begins with it first used observation at Simeiz Observatory on 18 August 1928, more than 6 years after to its official discovery observation.

== Naming ==
This minor planet was named after British amateur astronomer and stellar cartographer John Franklin Adams (1843–1912), who created one of the earliest detailed, photographic atlases of the complete night sky (the Franklin-Adams plates or charts). He later donated his 25-centimeter Franklin-Adams Star Camera (Franklin-Adams photographic refractor) to the Johannesburg Observatory, which lead to the discovery of Proxima Centauri. The naming was mentioned in The Names of the Minor Planets by Paul Herget in 1955 (H 94). Another asteroid, 1925 Franklin-Adams, discovered by Hendrik van Gent in 1934, was also named in his memory on 20 December 1983 (M.P.C. 8402).

== Physical characteristics ==
In the Tholen- and SMASS-like taxonomy of the Small Solar System Objects Spectroscopic Survey (S3OS2), Franklina is an uncommon A-type and Ld-type asteroid, respectively.

=== Rotation period ===
In October 2004, a rotational lightcurve of Franklina was obtained from photometric observations by American Brian Warner at his Palmer Divide Observatory (716) in Colorado. Lightcurve analysis gave a rotation period of at least 16 hours with a brightness amplitude of 0.05 magnitude or more (U=2−). The results, however, apart from an 8-hour long decline in brightness, are not very conclusive. Two month earlier, French amateur astronomer Cyril Cavadore also attempted to determine the asteroid's period with little success (U=1). Based on its exceptionally low brightness variation, Franklina might be a rather spherical body with little to no albedo features on its surface, or, it might be due to a yet undetermined long period. Typically, a collaboration of astronomers taking photometric measurements around the globe is required to measures the period of such slow rotators.

=== Diameter and albedo ===
According to the survey carried out by the Infrared Astronomical Satellite IRAS, the Japanese Akari satellite, and the NEOWISE mission of NASA's Wide-field Infrared Survey Explorer, Franklina measures between 31.1 and 33.2 kilometers in diameter and its surface has an albedo between 0.18 and 0.21. The Collaborative Asteroid Lightcurve Link derives an albedo of 0.1837, and adopts a diameter of 32.47 kilometers from IRAS, based on an absolute magnitude of 9.9.
