= SS Pennsylvania (1896) =

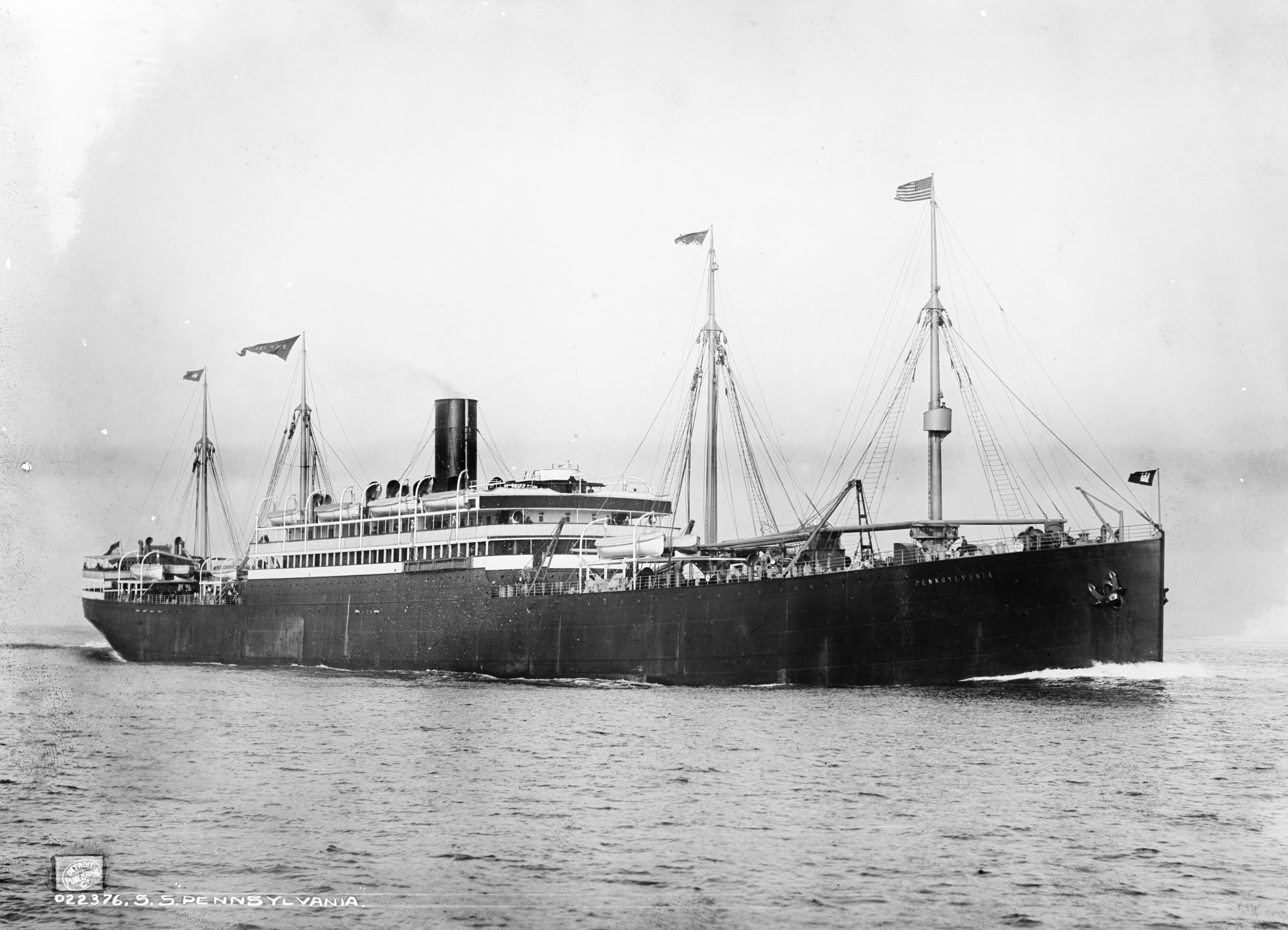
- Pennsylvania about 1897–1900

History
- Name: 1896: Pennsylvania; 1917: Nansemond
- Namesake: 1896: Pennsylvania; 1917: Nansemond
- Owner: 1897: Hamburg America Line; 1917: US Shipping Board
- Operator: 1917: Army Transport Service; 1919: United States Navy
- Port of registry: 1897: (German Empire) Hamburg; 1919: (United States) New York
- Route: Hamburg – New York
- Builder: Harland and Wolff, Belfast
- Yard number: 302
- Launched: 10 September 1896
- Completed: 30 January 1897
- Acquired: seized by USA, April 1917
- Commissioned: into US Navy, 20 January 1919
- Decommissioned: from US Navy, 25 August 1919
- Maiden voyage: 30 January 1897
- Reclassified: troop ship, 1917
- Refit: 1910, 1919
- Identification: code letters: 1897–1917: RKPB; 1917 (US Shipping Board): LHMJ; 1919 (US Navy): GJBN; 1919 (US Shipping Board): NITL; 1913: wireless call sign DDN; 1919: pennant number ID-1395
- Fate: Scrapped 1924

General characteristics
- Class & type: P-class ocean liner
- Tonnage: 13,265 GRT, 8,527 NRT
- Displacement: 25,000 long tons (25,401 t)
- Length: 559.4 ft (170.5 m)
- Beam: 62.2 ft (19.0 m)
- Draft: 28 ft 5 in (8.66 m)
- Depth: 30.0 ft (9.1 m)
- Decks: 4
- Installed power: 695 NHP
- Propulsion: 2 × quadruple-expansion engines; 2 × propellers
- Speed: 14 knots (26 km/h)
- Capacity: passengers: 1897: 162 1st class, 197 2nd class, 2,382 3rd class 1910: 404 2nd class, 2,200 3rd class
- Troops: at least 2,327
- Complement: as troop ship: 399
- Crew: in civilian service: 250
- Sensors & processing systems: submarine signalling
- Armament: 1917–18: 2 × 6-inch/40-caliber guns; 2 × 3-inch/50-caliber guns
- Notes: sister ships: Pretoria, Graf Waldersee, Patricia

SS Pennsylvania was a transatlantic liner that was launched in Ireland in 1896 and spent most of her career with Hamburg America Line (HAPAG). She was the first of a class of four HAPAG sister ships that were built in the United Kingdom and Germany between 1896 and 1899.

In 1917 the US Government seized Pennsylvania and renamed her Nansemond. She was a troop ship with the Army Transport Service until the end of the First World War. In 1919 the US Navy operated her as the troop ship USS Nansemond (ID-1395).

In August 1919 the Navy returned Nansemond to the United States Shipping Board, who had her converted to a cargo-only ship. She was scrapped in 1924.

== Building ==
Harland and Wolff built Pennsylvania in Belfast, launching her on 10 September 1896 and completing her on 30 January 1897. Her registered length was 559.4 ft (170.5 m), her beam was 62.2 ft (19.0 m) and her depth was 30.0 ft (9.1 m). Her tonnages were 13,265 GRT, 8,527 NRT and 25,000 long tons (25,401 t) displacement.

Harland and Wolff built Pennsylvania as a three-class ship. She originally had berths for 162 passengers in first class, 197 in second class and 2,382 in third class.

Pennsylvania had twin propellers, each driven by a four-cylinder quadruple-expansion steam engine. Between them her twin engines were rated at 695 NHP and gave her a speed of 14 knots (26 km/h).

HAPAG registered Arcadia in Hamburg. Her code letters were RKPB.

Sister ships followed Pennsylvania from German shipyards. Blohm & Voss built Pretoria in 1897 and Graf Waldersee in 1898. AG Vulcan Stettin built Patricia in 1899.

== Pennsylvania ==
On 30 January 1897 Pennsylvania began her maiden voyage from Belfast to New York. Her regular route was between New York and Hamburg.

On 24 September 1902 Pennsylvania rescued all 13 crew from the Norwegian barque Bothnia, who had been struggling against rising water for 17 days. On 8 March 1910 Pennsylvania accidentally rammed the Hamburg-registered schooner Gertrud in the mouth of the Elbe, killing five of the schooner's six crew.

After the collision, Pennsylvania was refitted as a two-class ship, with berths for 404 second class and 2,200 third class passengers. The refit increased her tonnage to 13,333 GRT.

In the same 1910 refit a flight deck was installed on her after deckhouse for an aeroplane to take off and fly up to 43 nautical miles (80 km). After a number of test flights the flight deck was removed.

By 1913 Pennsylvania was equipped for wireless telegraphy. Her call sign was DDN.

On 18 July 1914, amid the July Crisis in Europe, Pennsylvania left Hamburg for New York. In the first week of August the First World War began, so Pennsylvania remained in the neutral US.

== Nansemond ==
On 6 April 1917 The US declared war on Germany. The US Shipping Board seized Pennsylvania and renamed her Nansemond. She was given two 6-inch/40-caliber guns and two 3-inch/50-caliber guns as defensive armament. For the remainder of the war the Army Transport Service used Nansemond as a troop ship. The cargoes she carried from the US to Europe included railroad locomotives.

Late in November 1918 Nansemond left Saint-Nazaire in France carrying 16 Medical Corps personnel and 148 patients suffering from shell shock. She was caught in a succession of westerly and northwesterly gales, and on 30 November and 1 December she weathered waves up to 40 feet (12 m) high. She reached a US port on 7 December, five days late.

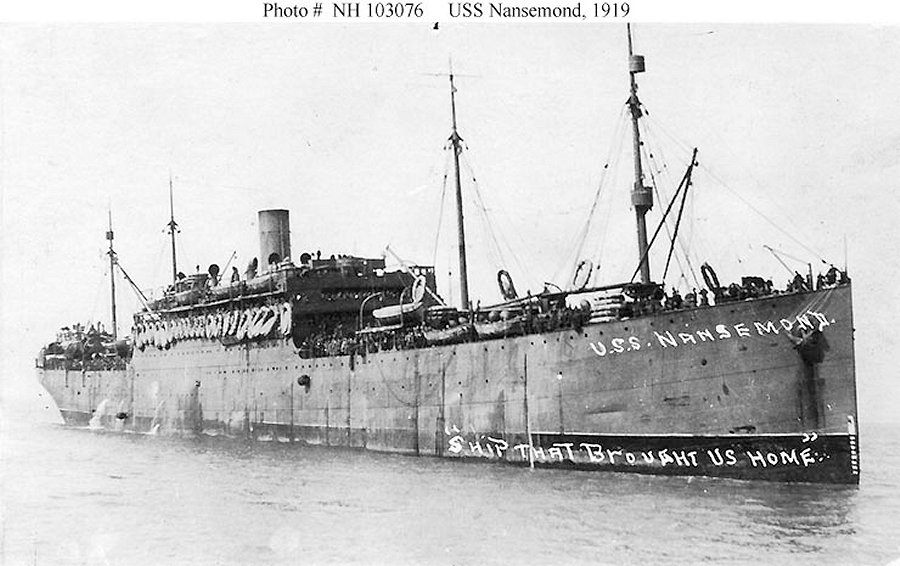
USS Nansemond in 1919, with homeward-bound US troops lining her rails

At Hoboken, New Jersey on 20 January 1919 Nansemond was commissioned into the US Navy with the pennant number ID-1395 and code letters GJBN. Lt Cdr W McLeod, USNRF, was appointed to command her, and she was assigned to the Naval Overseas Transportation Service. For Navy service she was repainted with a black hull and funnel, white superstructure and yellow masts.

On 4 February Nansemond left New York carrying Army supplies, and on 16 February she reached St-Nazaire. On 26 February she left St-Nazaire carrying members of the American Expeditionary Forces, and on 11 March she reached Newport News, Virginia. She spent the next five months crossing and re-crossing the North Atlantic, making a round trip every 32 days.

On 28 June Nansemond left Brest, France carrying members of the 802nd Pioneer Infantry, which was an African-American unit. Also aboard was Frank Monroe Upton, a US Navy ensign who had been awarded the Congressional Medal of Honor.

On 23 August 1919 Nansemond reached New York from Brest carrying 2,327 troops. On 25 August the Navy decommissioned her and returned her to the US Shipping Board the same day.

== Fate ==
The USSB sent Nansemond to the National Dry Dock and Repair Company to be converted into a cargo-only ship. A strike or strikes delayed the work, which was not completed until 19 December. The USSB retained Cox & Stevens to prepare plans for new cabin and steerage accommodation, but did not commission the refit to be undertaken.

The USSB at first allocated Nansemond to American Line. The Board then bareboat chartered her to the Army Transport Service, which operated her between Antwerp and New York.

Nansemond was then laid up with other USSB ships in the lower Hudson River. She was scrapped in 1924 in Baltimore by the Boston Iron and Metals Company.
