= SS Pretoria (1897) =

German built transatlantic liner

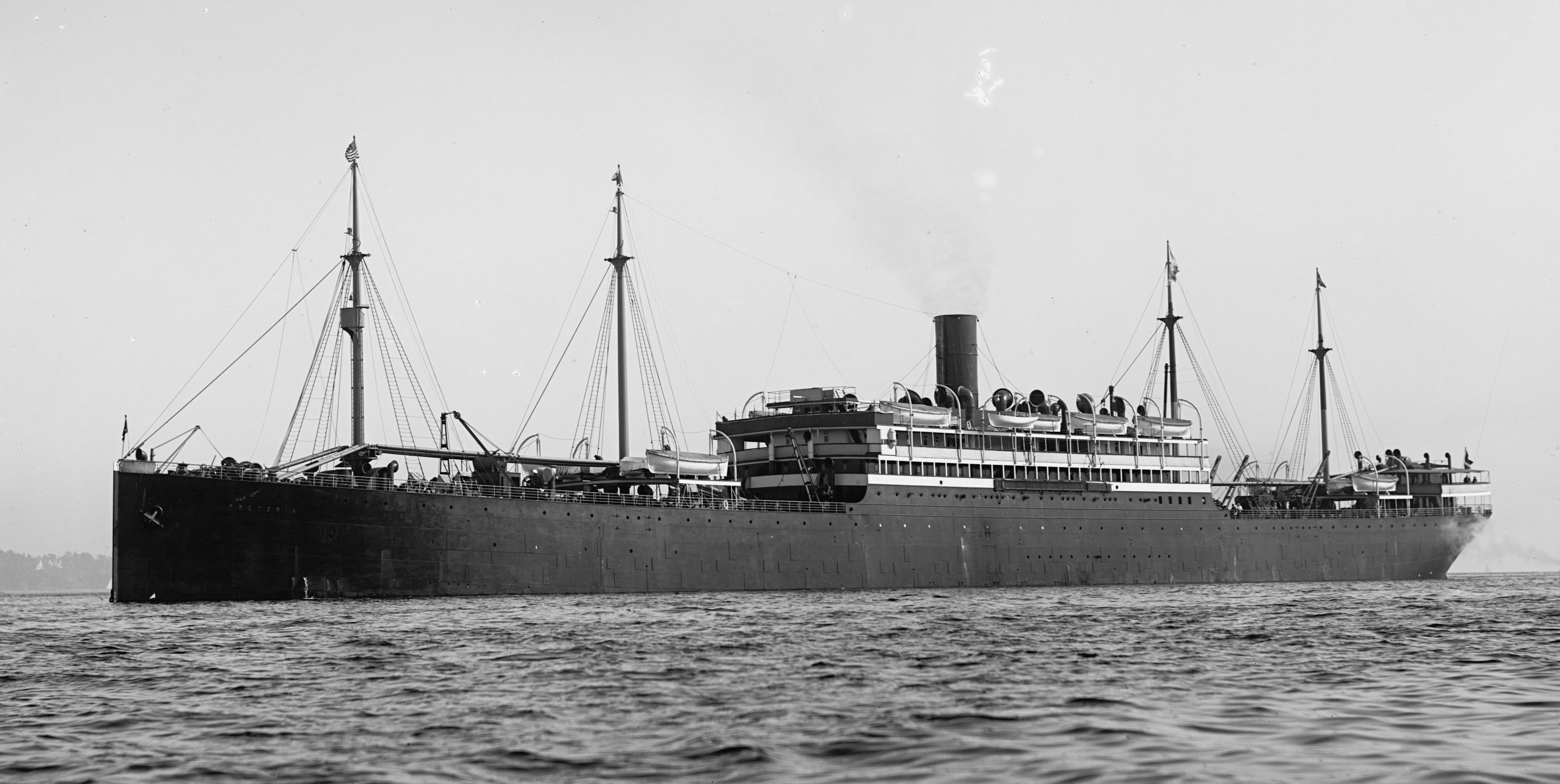
- Pretoria about 1898

History
- Name: Pretoria
- Namesake: Pretoria
- Owner: 1898: Hamburg America Line; 1919: United States Shipping Board; 1920: UK Shipping Controller
- Operator: early 1919: United States Navy; late 1919: Ellerman Lines
- Port of registry: 1898: (German Empire) Hamburg; 1919: United States of America; 1920: United Kingdom
- Builder: Blohm & Voss, Hamburg
- Launched: 9 October 1897
- Acquired: by US Government, 28 March 1919
- Commissioned: into US Navy, 29 March 1919
- Maiden voyage: 12–24 February 1898
- Reclassified: troop ship, 1919
- Refit: 1910
- Stricken: from US Navy, 25 November 1919
- Identification: code letters: 1898: RKTS; early 1919: GJBT; 1919: NIVG; by 1913: wireless call sign DDT
- Fate: Scrapped 1921

General characteristics
- Class & type: P-class ocean liner
- Tonnage: 1897: 12,800 GRT; 1914: 13,234 GRT, 8,415 NRT
- Displacement: 14,130 tons
- Length: 561.0 ft (171.0 m)
- Beam: 62.2 ft (19.0 m)
- Draft: 25 ft 9 in (7.8 m)
- Depth: 37.9 ft (11.6 m)
- Decks: 4
- Installed power: 1,000 NHP
- Propulsion: 2 × quadruple-expansion engines; 2 × propellers
- Speed: 14 knots (26 km/h)
- Capacity: passengers: 1898: 162 1st class, 197 2nd class, 2,382 3rd class; 1910: 400 2nd class, 2,200 3rd class
- Complement: 542
- Sensors & processing systems: submarine signalling
- Notes: sister ships: Pennsylvania, Patricia, Graf Waldersee

SS Pretoria was a transatlantic liner that was launched in Germany in 1897 and spent most of her career with Hamburg America Line (HAPAG). She was the second of a class of four HAPAG sister ships that were built in the United Kingdom and Germany between 1896 and 1899.

In 1919 HAPAG surrendered Pretoria to the United States as part of Germany's World War I reparations to the Allies. She became a United States Navy troop ship and was used to repatriate American Expeditionary Forces troops from Europe.

Later in 1919 she was transferred from the US government to the UK Shipping Controller. She was scrapped in 1921.

== Building ==
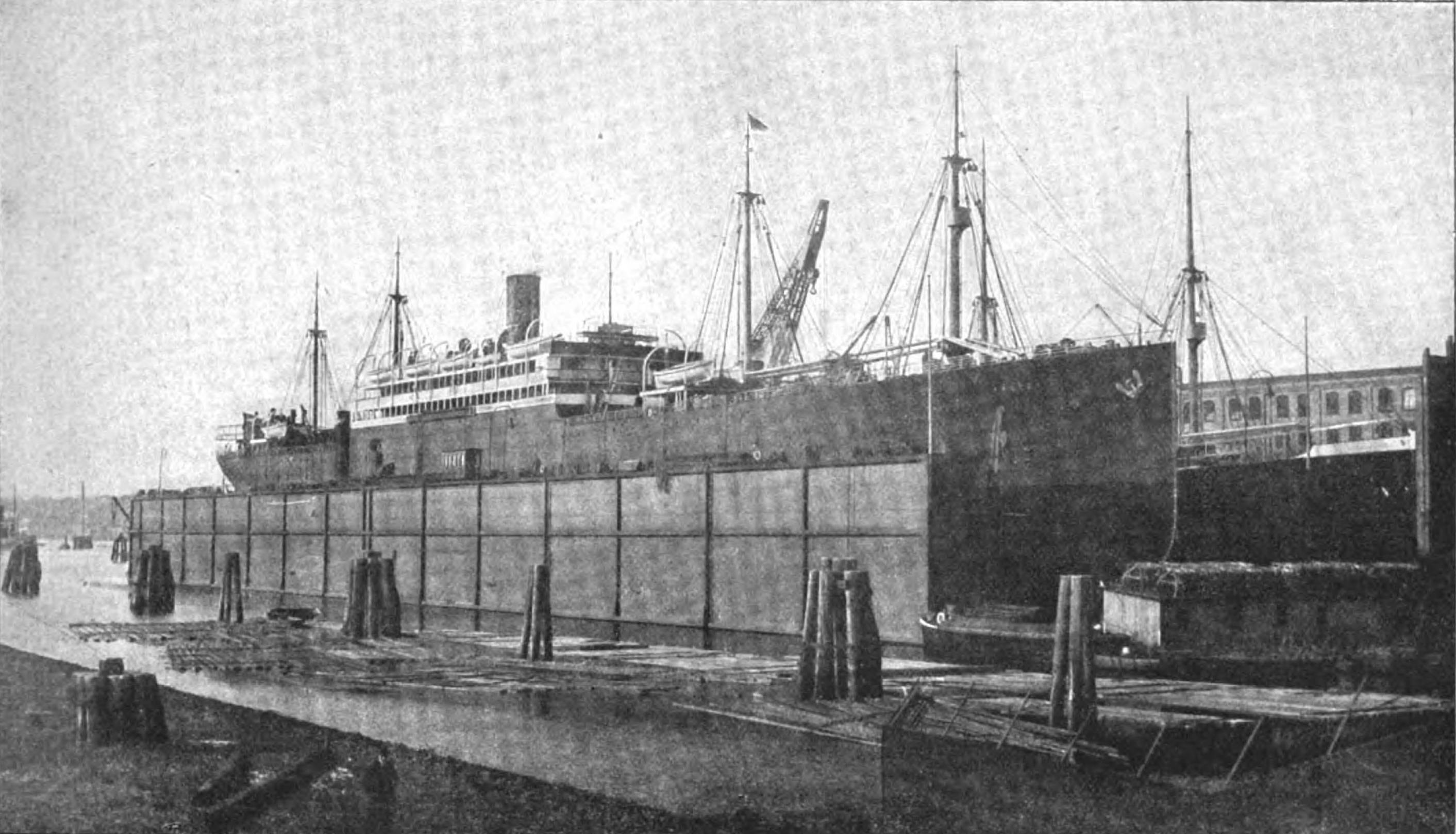
Pretoria in Blohm & Voss's floating dock in Hamburg

Pretoria was the second of HAPAG's four P-class ocean liners, which were built in the latter half of the 1890s. Harland and Wolff launched the first of them, Pennsylvania, in 1896. AG Vulcan Stettin launched the last of the four, Patricia, in 1899. Blohm & Voss in Hamburg built the second and third of the sisters, launching Pretoria in 1897 and Graf Waldersee in 1898.

Pretoria was launched on 9 October 1897 and completed in February 1898. Her registered length was 561.0 ft (171.0 m), her beam was 62.2 ft (19.0 m) and her depth was 37.9 ft (11.6 m). She had berths for 162 first class passengers, 197 second class and 2,382 third class, and her tonnage was 12,800 GRT and 14,130 tons displacement.

Pretoria had twin propellers, each driven by a four-cylinder quadruple-expansion steam engine. Between them her twin engines were rated at 1,000 NHP and gave her a speed of 14 knots (26 km/h).

HAPAG registered Arcadia in Hamburg. Her code letters were RKTS.

== German service ==
Pretoria made her maiden voyage in 1898. She left Hamburg on 12 February and reaching New York on 24 February.

In March 1899 HAPAG announced that the regular route for Pretoria and her three sisters would be Hamburg – Cherbourg – Plymouth – New York. HAPAG also announced a reduction in its transatlantic fares. On Pretoria and her sisters the rate for a first class cabin was reduced from $65 to $50, and that for a second class cabin was reduced from $47.50 to $38.

On 9 October 1908 in fog in the North Sea southwest of Texel in the Netherlands, Pretoria collided with the German cargo steamship Nipponia. Nipponia sank, and her captain and 12 members of his crew were lost.

In 1910 Pretoria was refitted as a two-class ship. First class was abolished, second class was increased to 400 berths and third class to 2,200 berths. The refit increased her tonnage to 13,234 GRT and 8,415 NRT.

By 1913 Pretoria was equipped for wireless telegraphy. Her call sign was DDT.

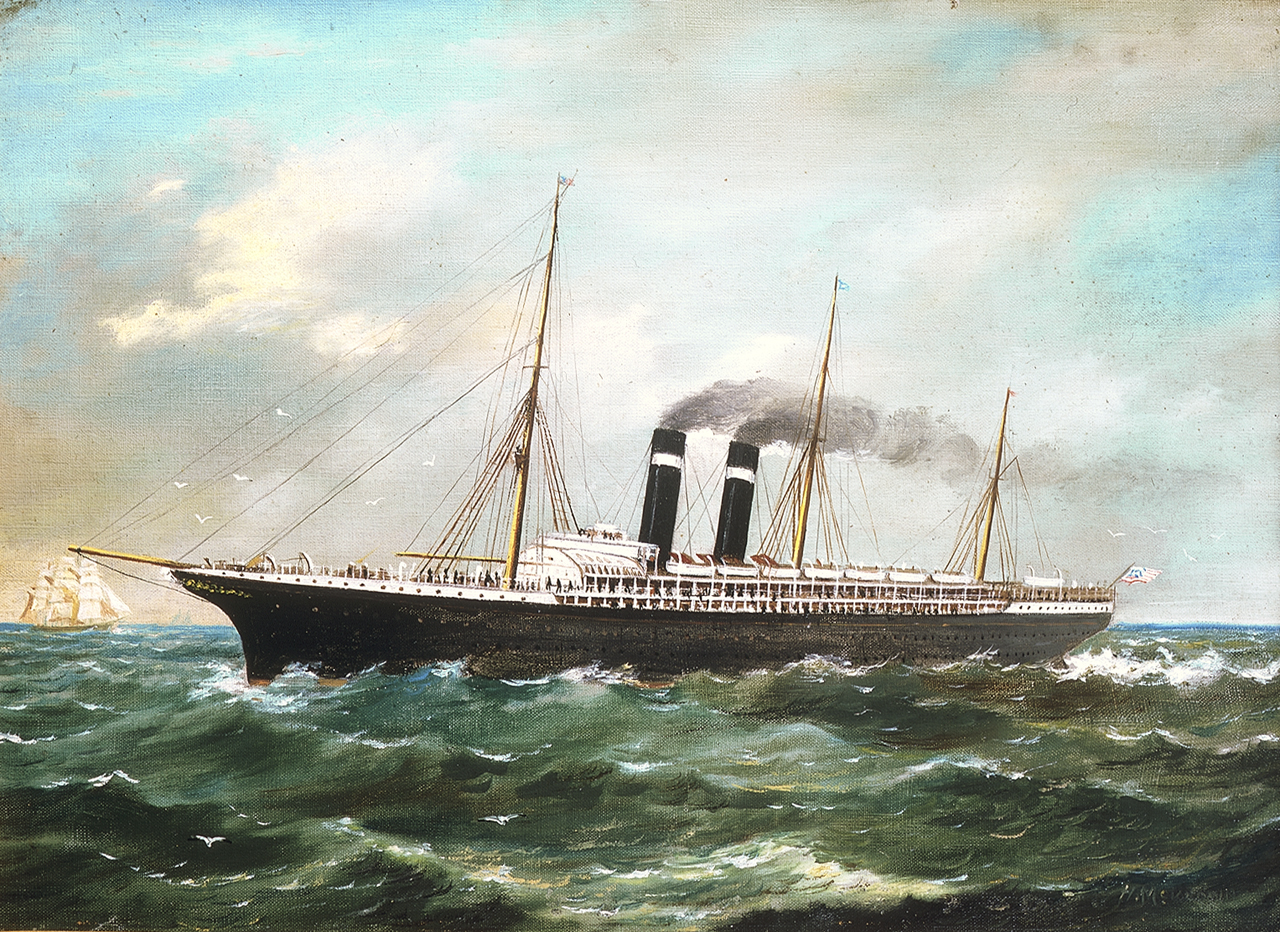
A painting of New York, with which Pretoria collided in 1914

On the night of 12–13 June 1914, in fog about 180 miles from the Nantucket lightvessel, Pretoria collided with the American Line ship New York. Pretoria tore a 15 by 32 feet (4.6 by 9.8 m) hole in New York's hull and left Pretoria's port anchor embedded in New York's structure. The hole was 15 feet (4.6 m) above the water line, and New York was able to complete her voyage to New York unaided. American Line alleged Pretoria was off-course. Pretoria's Captain Dugge denied this.

Pretoria returned to Hamburg for repairs. While she was in Hamburg the First World War began. Pretoria remained in Hamburg for the duration.

== US service ==
On 28 March 1919 HAPAG surrendered Pretoria to the US Navy. The next day at Cowes, Isle of Wight she was commissioned as USS Pretoria. On 17 April she left Brest, France for New York carrying 300 officers and 1,785 men of the American Expeditionary Forces and 41 civilian passengers. The troops included the 151st Field Artillery Regiment of the Minnesota Army National Guard. Pretoria reached New York on 26 April, two days ahead of schedule.

On 6 June 1919 Pretoria reached New York carrying 2,986 troops of the 36th Infantry Division. On 12 July she reached New York carrying troops including the 1st Censor and Press Company, which included the staff of the Stars and Stripes newspaper.

On 12 August 1919 Pretoria left Brest carrying members of the 3rd Infantry Division, including the 8th Machine Gun Battalion. Two days later a private of the 104th Wagon Train attempted suicide by jumping overboard. Another private made fast a rope, jumped overboard with the rope and rescued him. On 19 August a fire was discovered in one of Pretoria's bunkers. Soldiers helped the crew to move coal away from the fire, which was extinguished the next day.

== UK service ==
On 6 September 1919 it was announced that as soon as the United States Department of War had no further use for ships seized from German ports under the Treaty of Versailles, they would be returned to the Inter-Allied Council. The council would decide whether to return the ships to their German owners or redistribute them among the Allies. Pretoria was among the ships affected, along with Cap Finisterre, Imperator, Kaiserin Auguste Victoria, Mobile, Patricia, Prinz Friedrich Wilhelm, Santa Elena and Zeppelin.

On 25 November 1919 Pretoria was transferred from the US Navy to the United States Shipping Board. Later she was transferred to the UK Shipping Controller, who contracted Ellerman Lines to manage her. In the first week of January 1920 in New York Harbor she suffered three fires in as many days. The third was on 4 January, when she was moored at Staten Island Pier waiting to sail in cargo. The fire broke out in her forward hold, and caused damage estimated at $100,000.

Pretoria was scrapped in November 1921.
