= 1305 Pongola =

Main-belt asteroid

1305 Phongol0
Discovery
- Discovered by: H. E. Wood
- Discovery site: Johannesburg Obs.
- Discovery date: 19 July 1928

Designations
- Named after: Pongola River (South Africa river)
- Alternative designations: 1928 OC · 1927 FD; 1929 SQ · 1932 FA; 1933 MB · 1979 NE
- Minor planet category: main-belt · (outer) background

Orbital characteristics
- Epoch 4 September 2017 (JD 2458000.5)
- Uncertainty parameter 0
- Observation arc: 90.59 yr (33,087 days)
- Aphelion: 3.2336 AU
- Perihelion: 2.7909 AU
- Semi-major axis: 3.0123 AU
- Eccentricity: 0.0735
- Orbital period (sidereal): 5.23 yr (1,910 days)
- Mean anomaly: 89.261°
- Mean motion: 0° 11^{m} 18.6^{s} / day
- Inclination: 2.3174°
- Longitude of ascending node: 62.956°
- Argument of perihelion: 146.96°

Physical characteristics
- Dimensions: 24.110±0.277 km 25.12±0.91 km 25.124±0.200 km 41.45 km (derived)
- Synodic rotation period: 8 h 8.03 h 8.0585±0.0003 h 8.059±0.0015 h 8.06±0.02 h 8.335±0.002 h
- Geometric albedo: 0.057 (assumed); 0.157±0.012; 0.1576±0.0296; 0.169±0.038
- Spectral type: C (suspected); B–V = 0.700
- Absolute magnitude (H): 10.426±0.002 (R) · 10.64 · 10.65

1305 Phongolo, provisional designation 1928 OC, is a background asteroid from the outer regions of the asteroid belt, approximately 25 kilometers in diameter. It was discovered on 19 July 1928, by English astronomer Harry Edwin Wood at the Union Observatory in Johannesburg, South Africa. The asteroid was named for the South African Pongola River.

== Orbit and classification ==
Phongolo is a non-family asteroid from the main belt's background population. It orbits the Sun in the outer asteroid belt at a distance of 2.8–3.2 AU once every 5 years and 3 months (1,910 days; semi-major axis of 3.01 AU). Its orbit has an eccentricity of 0.07 and an inclination of 2° with respect to the ecliptic.

The body's observation arc begins with its first observation as 1927 FD at Heidelberg Observatory in March 1927, or 16 months prior to its official discovery observation at Johannesburg.

== Physical characteristics ==
Phongolo is a suspected carbonaceous C-type asteroid. The space-based survey gave an albedo (see below) that is not in-line with a carbonaceous spectral type.

=== Rotation period ===
Several rotational lightcurve of Phongolo have been obtained from photometric observations since 1984. Analysis of the best-rated lightcurve gave a rotation period of 8.335 hours and a consolidated brightness amplitude between 0.14 and 0.19 magnitude (U=3-).

=== Diameter and albedo ===
According to the surveys carried out by the Japanese Akari satellite and the NEOWISE mission of NASA's Wide-field Infrared Survey Explorer, Pongola measures between 24.110 and 25.124 kilometers in diameter and its surface has an albedo between 0.157 and 0.169.

The Collaborative Asteroid Lightcurve Link assumes a much lower standard albedo for carbonaceous asteroids of 0.057 and consequently derives a much larger diameter of 41.45 kilometers based on an absolute magnitude of 10.64.

== Naming ==
This minor planet was named by the discoverer after the Phongolo River (Phongolo; Pongolarivier) in KwaZulu-Natal, South Africa. The official naming citation was mentioned in The Names of the Minor Planets by Paul Herget in 1955 (H 119).
