= 1032 Pafuri =

Dark background asteroid from the outer regions of the asteroid belt

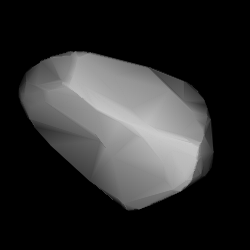
- Modelled shape of Pafuri, from its lightcurve

Discovery
- Discovered by: H. E. Wood
- Discovery site: Johannesburg Obs.
- Discovery date: 30 May 1924

Designations
- Named after: Pafuri Triangle/River (in South Africa)
- Alternative designations: 1924 SA · 1937 XB; 1947 SA · 1961 AQ; 1965 YJ · A917 CC
- Minor planet category: main-belt · (outer) background

Orbital characteristics
- Epoch 23 March 2018 (JD 2458200.5)
- Uncertainty parameter 0
- Observation arc: 100.95 yr (36,873 d)
- Aphelion: 3.5799 AU
- Perihelion: 2.6806 AU
- Semi-major axis: 3.1303 AU
- Eccentricity: 0.1436
- Orbital period (sidereal): 5.54 yr (2,023 d)
- Mean anomaly: 317.36°
- Mean motion: 0° 10^{m} 40.8^{s} / day
- Inclination: 9.4808°
- Longitude of ascending node: 76.322°
- Argument of perihelion: 189.23°

Physical characteristics
- Mean diameter: 54.61 km (derived); 54.67±3.4 km 62.60±0.81 km 65.658±0.280 km 68.74±24.54 km 70.27±18.94 km 75.265±0.792 km
- Synodic rotation period: 13 h (at least); 24 h (at least)
- Geometric albedo: 0.0312±0.0055; 0.04±0.01; 0.04±0.06; 0.042±0.009; 0.046±0.001; 0.0540 (derived); 0.0591±0.008
- Spectral type: SMASS = X · P C (assumed)
- Absolute magnitude (H): 10.00; 10.10 · 10.17; 10.41±0.53

1032 Pafuri, provisional designation 1924 SA, is a dark background asteroid from the outer regions of the asteroid belt, approximately 65 kilometers (40 miles) in diameter. It was discovered on 30 May 1924, by English astronomer Harry Edwin Wood at the Union Observatory in Johannesburg, South Africa. The asteroid was named for the river in the Pafuri Triangle in South Africa, created by the confluence of the Limpopo and Levubu rivers. The body's spectral type and rotation period are still poorly determined.

== Orbit and classification ==
Pafuri is a non-family asteroid from the main belt's background population. It orbits the Sun in the outer main-belt at a distance of 2.7–3.6 AU once every 5 years and 6 months (2,023 days; semi-major axis of 3.13 AU). Its orbit has an eccentricity of 0.14 and an inclination of 9° with respect to the ecliptic.

The asteroid was first observed as A917 CC at Heidelberg Observatory in February 1917, where the body's observation arc begins in April 1929, nearly 5 years after its official discovery observation at Johannesburg.

== Naming ==
This minor planet was named after the river in the Pafuri Triangle, created by the confluence of the Limpopo and Levubu rivers in South Africa. The official naming citation was mentioned in The Names of the Minor Planets by Paul Herget in 1955 (H 98).

== Physical characteristics ==
In the SMASS classification, Pafuri is an X-type asteroid, while the Wide-field Infrared Survey Explorer (WISE) characterized it as a primitive and darker P-type asteroid. The Collaborative Asteroid Lightcurve Link assumes it to be a carbonaceous C-type asteroid.

=== Rotation period ===
In November 2009, a rotational lightcurve of Pafuri was obtained from photometric observations by French amateur astronomer Pierre Antonini who suspects it to be a slow rotator. Lightcurve analysis gave a rotation period of at least 24 hours with a brightness variation of more than 0.15 magnitude (U=n.a.). The result supersedes a previous period of at least 13 hours at the Oakley Observatory in the United States (U=n.a.). As of 2018, no secure rotation period has been obtained.

=== Diameter and albedo ===
According to the surveys carried out by the Infrared Astronomical Satellite IRAS, the Japanese Akari satellite and the NEOWISE mission of NASA's WISE telescope, Pafuri measures between 54.67 and 75.265 kilometers in diameter and its surface has an albedo between 0.0312 and 0.0591. CALL derives an albedo of 0.0540 and a diameter of 54.61 kilometers based on an absolute magnitude of 10.1.
