= 1096 Reunerta =

Asteroid from the background population of the asteroid belt's central region

Discovery
- Discovered by: H. E. Wood
- Discovery site: Johannesburg Obs.
- Discovery date: 21 July 1928

Designations
- Named after: Theodore Reunert (South African engineer)
- Alternative designations: 1928 OB
- Minor planet category: main-belt · (middle) background

Orbital characteristics
- Epoch 4 September 2017 (JD 2458000.5)
- Uncertainty parameter 0
- Observation arc: 88.43 yr (32,300 days)
- Aphelion: 3.1055 AU
- Perihelion: 2.0967 AU
- Semi-major axis: 2.6011 AU
- Eccentricity: 0.1939
- Orbital period (sidereal): 4.20 yr (1,532 days)
- Mean anomaly: 65.066°
- Mean motion: 0° 14^{m} 5.64^{s} / day
- Inclination: 9.4713°
- Longitude of ascending node: 81.346°
- Argument of perihelion: 248.00°

Physical characteristics
- Dimensions: 35.95±14.97 km 38.51±11.33 km 42.333±0.232 km 43.30±0.75 km 45.65 km (derived); 45.736±0.577 km 45.83±2.7 km 46.34±0.76 km
- Synodic rotation period: 13.02±0.01 h 13.030±0.006 h 13.036±0.002 h 13.036±0.0073 h
- Geometric albedo: 0.043±0.007; 0.0445 (derived); 0.06±0.07; 0.0638±0.008; 0.0641±0.0155; 0.072±0.003
- Spectral type: C
- Absolute magnitude (H): 10.30 · 10.506±0.002 (R) · 10.70 · 10.72 · 11.30±0.88

1096 Reunerta, provisional designation 1928 OB, is an asteroid from the background population of the asteroid belt's central region, approximately 40 kilometers in diameter. It was discovered on 21 July 1928, by astronomer Harry Edwin Wood at the Union Observatory in Johannesburg, South Africa. The asteroid was named after South African engineer Theodore Reunert, supporter of the observatory and friend of the discoverer.

== Orbit and classification ==
Reunerta is a non-family asteroid from the main belt's background population. It orbits the Sun in the central main-belt at a distance of 2.1–3.1 AU once every 4 years and 2 months (1,532 days). Its orbit has an eccentricity of 0.19 and an inclination of 9° with respect to the ecliptic. The body's observation arc begins with its official discovery observation at Johannesburg.

== Physical characteristics ==
Reunerta is an assumed carbonaceous C-type asteroid.

=== Rotation period ===
Since 2000, several rotational lightcurves of Reunerta were obtained from photometric observations by Robert Stephens, Roberto Crippa and Federico Manzini, as well as by astronomers at the Palomar Transient Factory in California. Analysis of the best-rated lightcurve gave a rotation period of 13.036 hours with a brightness amplitude of xyz magnitude (U=2/2/2/3).

=== Diameter and albedo ===
According to the surveys carried out by the Infrared Astronomical Satellite IRAS, the Japanese Akari satellite and the NEOWISE mission of NASA's Wide-field Infrared Survey Explorer, Reunerta measures between 35.95 and 46.34 kilometers in diameter and its surface has an albedo between 0.043 and 0.072.

The Collaborative Asteroid Lightcurve Link derives an albedo of 0.0445 and a diameter of 45.65 kilometers based on an absolute magnitude of 10.7.

== Naming ==
This minor planet was named after Theodore Reunert, a mining engineer in South Africa. He was also a member of the South African Association for the Advancement of Science, supporter of the discovering Union Observatory and a friend of the discoverer, who was the director of the discovering Union Observatory at the time. The observatory's Reunert Telescope, a 9-inch (23 cm) telescope, was also named in his honor in 1927. The official naming citation was mentioned in The Names of the Minor Planets by Paul Herget in 1955 (H 103).
