= John Franklin-Adams =

British astronomer

John Franklin-Adams (c. 1843 – 1912) was a British astronomer and stellar cartographer. The minor planets 982 Franklina and 1925 Franklin-Adams are named after him.
