= 758 Mancunia =

Minor planet orbiting the Sun

Discovery
- Discovered by: H. E. Wood
- Discovery site: Johannesburg
- Discovery date: 18 May 1912

Designations
- Pronunciation: /mænˈkjuːniə/
- Alternative designations: 1912 PE

Orbital characteristics
- Epoch 31 July 2016 (JD 2457600.5)
- Uncertainty parameter 0
- Observation arc: 101.39 yr (37034 d)
- Aphelion: 3.6704 AU (549.08 Gm)
- Perihelion: 2.7081 AU (405.13 Gm)
- Semi-major axis: 3.1893 AU (477.11 Gm)
- Eccentricity: 0.15086
- Orbital period (sidereal): 5.70 yr (2080.3 d)
- Mean anomaly: 260.973°
- Mean motion: 0° 10^{m} 22.98^{s} / day
- Inclination: 5.6102°
- Longitude of ascending node: 106.200°
- Argument of perihelion: 314.999°
- Earth MOID: 1.72323 AU (257.792 Gm)
- Jupiter MOID: 1.66575 AU (249.193 Gm)
- T_{Jupiter}: 3.172

Physical characteristics
- Mean radius: 43.54 ± 0.655 km (composite estimate); 42.74±3.35 km
- Mass: (9.31 ± 0.80) × 10^{17} kg (composite estimate) (1.41±0.22)×10^{18} kg (Note: Calculated from its standard gravitational parameter GM = 0.094±0.015 km^{3}/s^{2}.)
- Mean density: 2.69 ± 0.26 g/cm^{3} 3.80 g/cm^{3} (Note: Assuming a diameter of 89 km.)
- Synodic rotation period: 12.7253 h (0.53022 d)
- Geometric albedo: 0.1317±0.023
- Absolute magnitude (H): 8.16

758 Mancunia is a minor planet orbiting the Sun. It was discovered in 1912 from Johannesburg by H. E. Wood, a Mancunian. This object is orbiting at a distance of 3.19 AU with a period of 5.70 years. With an eccentricity (ovalness) of 0.15, its orbital path ranges from 2.71 to 3.19 AU. The orbital plane is inclined at an angle of 5.61° to the plane of the ecliptic.

Observation of this asteroid in 1996 suggested a rotation period of 6.902 hours. However, radar observations from Arecibo indicated this may be in error. Independent photometry measurements made during December 2006 were combined to determine an estimated period nearly double that of the original, or 12.7253±0.0006 h with a brightness variation amplitude of 0.26±0.02 in magnitude. A high radar albedo indicates this object is most likely metallic. Dips in the radar echo suggests there are large concavities on both sides. It is classified as an X-type asteroid in the Tholen taxonomy and spans a girth of 85±7 km.
