= 1663 van den Bos =

Slow-rotating main-belt asteroid

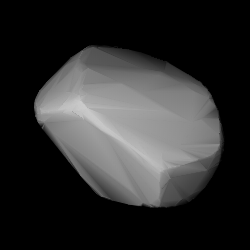
- van den Bos modeled from its lightcurve

Discovery
- Discovered by: H. E. Wood
- Discovery site: Johannesburg Obs.
- Discovery date: 4 August 1926

Designations
- Named after: Willem van den Bos (astronomer)
- Alternative designations: 1926 PE · 1928 DD; 1936 OM · 1948 BE; 1948 EG_{1} · 1949 KE; 1950 XD · 1963 SC
- Minor planet category: main-belt · Flora

Orbital characteristics
- Epoch 4 September 2017 (JD 2458000.5)
- Uncertainty parameter 0
- Observation arc: 88.62 yr (32,370 days)
- Aphelion: 2.6437 AU
- Perihelion: 1.8357 AU
- Semi-major axis: 2.2397 AU
- Eccentricity: 0.1804
- Orbital period (sidereal): 3.35 yr (1,224 days)
- Mean anomaly: 33.128°
- Mean motion: 0° 17^{m} 38.76^{s} / day
- Inclination: 5.3617°
- Longitude of ascending node: 83.196°
- Argument of perihelion: 275.24°

Physical characteristics
- Dimensions: 7.58±0.67 km 11.697±0.048 km 12.25 km (derived); 13.537±0.339 km
- Synodic rotation period: 155±5 h (wrong); 740±10 h
- Geometric albedo: 0.1708±0.0178; 0.184±0.025; 0.2045 (derived); 0.255±0.022; 0.406±0.074
- Spectral type: S
- Absolute magnitude (H): 11.80 · 11.86±0.28 · 11.9 · 12.2

1663 van den Bos, provisional designation 1926 PE, is a stony Florian asteroid and an exceptionally slow rotator from the inner regions of the asteroid belt, approximately 12 kilometers in diameter. It was discovered on 4 August 1926, by English astronomer Harry Edwin Wood at Johannesburg Observatory in South Africa. It was later named after astronomer Willem Hendrik van den Bos.

== Orbit and classification ==
The S-type asteroid is a member of the Flora family, a large group of stony asteroids in the main-belt. It orbits the Sun at a distance of 1.8–2.6 AU once every 3 years and 4 months (1,224 days). Its orbit has an eccentricity of 0.18 and an inclination of 5° with respect to the ecliptic.

In March 2082, van den Bos will pass 29 Amphitrite at a distance of 0.0065 AU (972,000 km). The body's observation arc begins with a post-recovery observation taken at Johannesburg in 1936, when it was also identified as 1936 OM, which is a full decade after its official discovery observation from 1926.

== Physical characteristics ==
=== Slow rotator ===
In October 2010, a rotational lightcurve of van den Bos was obtained from photometric observations by astronomers Robert Stephens and David Higgins. It gave a rotation period of 740 hours with a brightness variation of 0.80 magnitude (U=3-). It is one of the slowest rotating minor planets (see list) and a suspected tumbler, that has a non-principal axis rotation. At the same time, photometric observations at the Shadowbox Observatory gave an alternative, yet ambiguous period of 155 hours with an amplitude of 0.5 magnitude (U=1).

=== Diameter and albedo ===
According to the surveys carried out by the Japanese Akari satellite and NASA's Wide-field Infrared Survey Explorer with its subsequent NEOWISE mission, van den Bos measures between 7.58 and 13.54 kilometers in diameter, and its surface has an albedo between 0.171 and 0.255. The Collaborative Asteroid Lightcurve Link derives an albedo of 0.2045 and a diameter of 12.25 kilometers using an absolute magnitude of 11.9.

== Naming ==
This minor planet was named in honor of Dutch-born, South African astronomer Willem Hendrik van den Bos (1896–1974), former director of the Union Observatory (1941–1956) and president of the Astronomical Society of South Africa (1943–1955). He made visual micrometric observations and discovered thousands of double stars. The official naming citation was published by the Minor Planet Center on 1 July 1972 (M.P.C. 3297).
