= 790 Pretoria =

Main-belt Asteroid

Discovery
- Discovered by: H. E. Wood
- Discovery site: Johannesburg Observatory
- Discovery date: 16 January 1912

Designations
- Pronunciation: /prɪˈtɔːriə/
- Alternative designations: 1912 NW

Orbital characteristics
- Epoch 31 July 2016 (JD 2457600.5)
- Uncertainty parameter 0
- Observation arc: 92.04 yr (33619 d)
- Aphelion: 3.9279 AU (587.61 Gm)
- Perihelion: 2.8955 AU (433.16 Gm)
- Semi-major axis: 3.4117 AU (510.38 Gm)
- Eccentricity: 0.15130
- Orbital period (sidereal): 6.30 yr (2301.7 d)
- Mean anomaly: 87.1149°
- Mean motion: 0° 9^{m} 23.04^{s} / day
- Inclination: 20.526°
- Longitude of ascending node: 252.032°
- Argument of perihelion: 38.637°

Physical characteristics
- Mean radius: 85.185±1.3 km 80.49 ± 5.58 km
- Mass: (4.58 ± 0.28) × 10^{18} kg
- Mean density: 2.09 ± 0.45 g/cm^{3}
- Synodic rotation period: 10.37 h (0.432 d)
- Geometric albedo: 0.0384±0.001
- Absolute magnitude (H): 8.00

790 Pretoria is a minor planet orbiting the Sun that was discovered by English astronomer Harry Edwin Wood on January 16, 1912. It is a member of the Cybele group located beyond the core of the main belt (see Minor planet groups) and named after Pretoria, the capital city of South Africa.

10μ radiometric data collected from Kitt Peak in 1975 gave a diameter estimate of 175 km. In the present day it is estimated to be 170 km (106 mi) in diameter. Photometric measurements of the asteroid made in 2005 at the Palmer Divide Observatory showed a light curve with a period of 10.370 ± 0.002 hours and a brightness variation of 0.08 ± 0.03 in magnitude.

790 Pretoria has been observed to occult 15 stars between 1998 and 2023.
