= Harry Edwin Wood =

British-South African astronomer (1881–1946)

- Born: 3 February 1881; Manchester, United Kingdom
- Died: 27 February 1946 (aged 65); Mortimer, near Cradock, South Africa
- Education: University of Manchester
- Known for: First 24-hour weather forecasts in South Africa, 12 numbered asteroids
- Spouse: Mary Ethel Greengrass
- Scientific career
- Fields: Astronomy
- Workplaces: Royal Meteorological Society; South African Association for the Advancement of Science (1906); Royal Astronomical Society (1909); Astronomische Gesellschaft (1913); Royal Society of South Africa (1917)

Harry Edwin Wood (3 February 1881 – 27 February 1946) was an English astronomer, director of the Union Observatory in Johannesburg, and discoverer of minor planets.

Wood was born in Manchester, graduating from Manchester University in 1902 with first class honours in physics, going on to gain an MSc in 1905. In 1906 he was appointed the Chief Assistant at the Transvaal Meteorological Observatory, which soon acquired telescopes and which became known as the Union Observatory and later Republic Observatory. In July 1906, he established South Africa's first 24-hour weather forecasts through telegraph in the Transvaal. In 1909, he married Mary Ethel Greengrass, also a physics graduate of Manchester University. Wood served as the observatory's director from 1928 to 1941, succeeding Robert Innes. He also served as the president of the Astronomical Society of South Africa from 1929 to 1930.

Wood is credited by the Minor Planet Center with the discovery of 12 numbered asteroids during 1911–1932.

He died in Mortimer, near Cradock, South Africa, in 1946. The asteroid 1660 Wood, discovered by his colleague Jacobus Bruwer at Johannesburg, is named in his honour (M.P.C. 3297).

Asteroids discovered: 12
715 Transvaalia	22 April 1911	list
758 Mancunia	18 May 1912	list
790 Pretoria	16 January 1912	list
982 Franklina	21 May 1922	list
1032 Pafuri	30 May 1924	list
1096 Reunerta	21 July 1928	list
1241 Dysona	4 March 1932	list
1305 Pongola	19 July 1928	list
1595 Tanga	19 June 1930	list^{[A]}
1663 van den Bos	4 August 1926	list
2193 Jackson	18 May 1926	list
3300 McGlasson	10 July 1928	list
Co-discovery made with:^{A} C. Jackson

== See also ==
- List of minor planet discoverers
