= USS Zeppelin =

Passenger liner launched in 1914

Coordinates: 59°12′07″N 05°19′08″E

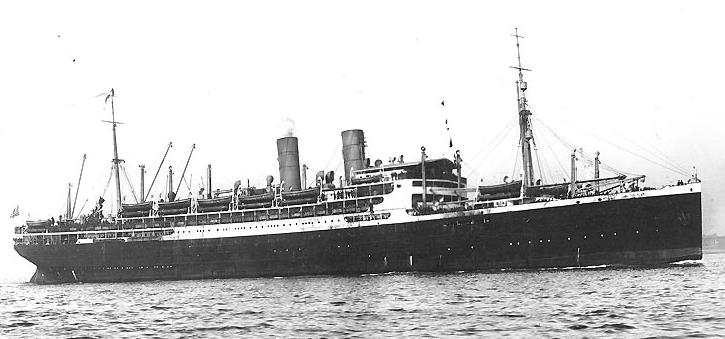
- USS Zeppelin while underway

History

German Empire
- Name: SS Zeppelin
- Namesake: Ferdinand von Zeppelin
- Port of registry: Bremen
- Builder: Bremer Vulkan AG
- Launched: 9 June 1914
- Completed: 21 January 1915
- Fate: Surrendered to United Kingdom 28 March 1919

United Kingdom
- Name: SS Zeppelin
- Operator: White Star Line
- Acquired: 1919
- Fate: Transferred to US Navy

United States
- Name: USS Zeppelin
- Namesake: Ferdinand von Zeppelin
- Route: Europe - New York
- Commissioned: 28 March 1919
- Decommissioned: 25 November 1919
- Reclassified: Troop ship
- Home port: New York
- Fate: Returned to British control, 27 December 1919

United Kingdom
- Name: RMS Ormuz
- Operator: Orient Steam Navigation Company
- Route: Great Britain - Australia
- Acquired: from UK Government, 1920
- Commissioned: 12 November 1921
- Reclassified: Passenger liner
- Refit: 1920-21
- Fate: Sold 1927

Weimar Republic
- Name: SS Dresden
- Operator: Norddeutscher Lloyd
- Port of registry: Bremen
- Route: Bremen - New York
- Acquired: 1927
- Refit: 1927
- Identification: Code Letters QMDS
- Fate: Beached 21 June 1934 & broken up

General characteristics
- Type: Passenger liner, troop transport
- Tonnage: 14,690 GRT
- Displacement: 21,753 long tons (22,102 t)
- Length: 550.3 ft (167.7 m)
- Beam: 67.3 ft (20.5 m)
- Draught: 35.1 ft (10.7 m)
- Installed power: 1850 NHP
- Propulsion: 2 quadruple-expansion steam engines; 2 screws
- Speed: 15.5 knots (28.7 km/h; 17.8 mph)
- Capacity: (1920-21 refit) 293 1st class, 882 3rd class; (1927 refit) 399 1st class, 288 tourist class, 284 3rd class

USS Zeppelin was a passenger liner launched in 1914 as SS Zeppelin by Bremer Vulkan, Bremen-Vegesack, Germany, for Norddeutscher Lloyd (NDL). Due to the First World War she never entered NDL service. She had a career after the war first under White Star Line control, then briefly as the troop ship USS Zeppelin, next as the Orient SN Co liner SS Ormuz and finally back with NDL as SS Dresden.

== Troop ship ==
SS Zeppelin was launched on 9 June 1914, and on completion she was handed over to Norddeutscher Lloyd (NDL) on 21 January 1915. By then the First Battle of the Atlantic of the First World War was under way so NDL laid her up at Bremen until the end of hostilities.

On 28 March 1919 she was surrendered as war reparations to the UK Government, who placed her under the management of the White Star Line. She was then handed over to the United States Navy, who commissioned her as USS Zeppelin and assigned to the New York Division of the Transport Force with Commander William W. Galbraith as her master.

USS Zeppelin made two round-trip voyages between the United States and Europe, returning 15,800 American soldiers back home. She then returned to Europe, was decommissioned on 25 November 1919 and returned to United Kingdom control on 27 December 1919.

== Civilian liner ==
The UK Government sold her to the Orient Steam Navigation Company in 1920, who renamed her SS Ormuz and had her refitted as a passenger liner. The Orient Line placed her in service on the route between the United Kingdom and Australia, on which she began her first sailing from the UK on 12 November 1921.

In 1927 NDL bought Ormuz back and had her refitted to upgrade much of the third class accommodation to first class or tourist class. NDL renamed her SS Dresden and placed her in service on the Bremen - New York route for which she had originally been built.

In April 1928, Dresden departed from New York carrying Soviet gold valued at £1,043,000. The gold was transferred to the cargo ship Reiher 12 nautical miles (22 km) off Falmouth, Cornwall, United Kingdom to prevent it being seized by the French when she docked at Cherbourg, Manche, France. Reiher took the gold to Bremerhaven.

== KdF cruise and loss ==
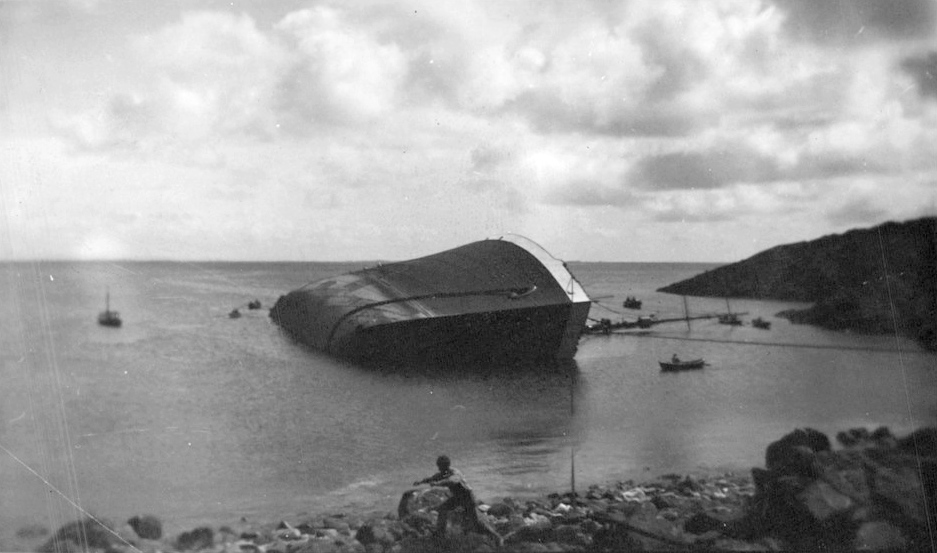
SS Dresden sunk in Boknafjord, 1934.

In 1934 the Nazi Kraft durch Freude organization started operating tourist cruises. KdF chartered Dresden and she sailed on her first KdF cruise on 11 June 1934. On 20 June she struck a rock off "Aregrunden" on the Norwegian island of Bokn. She was refloated but as a precaution was beached near Blikshavn on the island of Karmøy. In the early hours of 21 June she listed to port and the Norwegian "Hurtigrute" ship, DSD (Det Stavangerske Dampskibsselskap) 874 ton Kong Haakon, was one of those which took off her passengers. One life was lost in an accident during the transfer to the passenger ship. 4 people lost their lives in total. Other ships involved in the rescue of the 323 crew and 975 passengers were the French inspection vessel Ardente and the Norwegian ships Kong Harald, Kronprinsesse Martha, Kvitsøy and Stavanger.

A firm of shipbreakers from Stavanger broke up the ship where she lay. Remnants of the wreck remain near the shore, between 4 and 50 m (13 and 164 ft) depth.
