= RMS Empress of Scotland (1905) =

Ocean liner built in 1905 and 1906

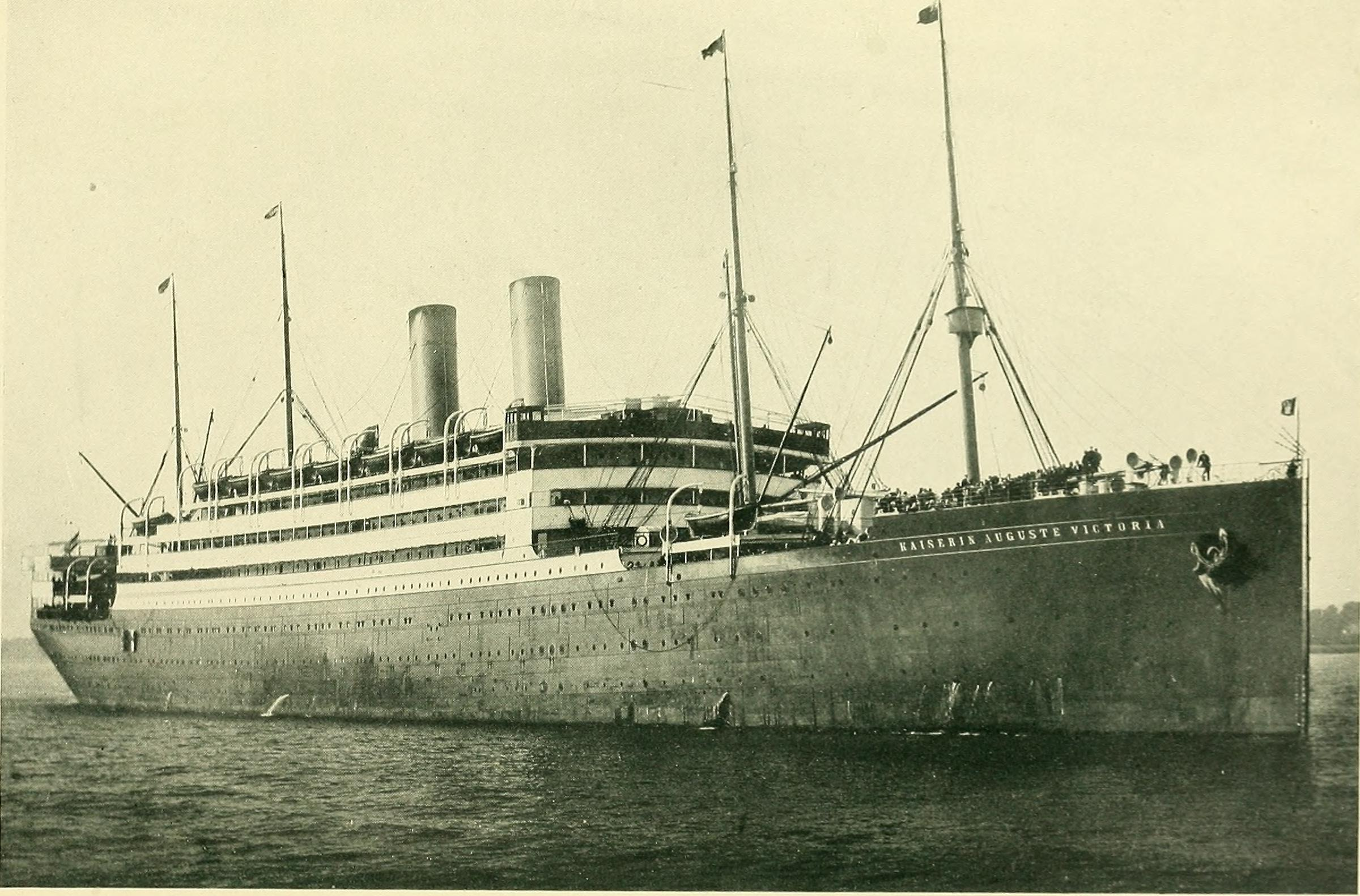
- Empress of Scotland seen before the First World War as Kaiserin Auguste Victoria

History

Germany
- Name: Kaiserin Auguste Victoria
- Owner: Hamburg America Line
- Port of registry: Hamburg
- Builder: Vulcan AG shipyard, Stettin, Germany
- Yard number: 264
- Launched: 29 August 1905 by the German Empress
- Maiden voyage: 10 May 1906
- Fate: Seized by the United States

United States
- Name: USS Kaiserin Auguste Victoria
- Owner: United States Navy
- Acquired: 1919
- Fate: Sold to Cunard Line

United Kingdom
- Name: Kaiserin Auguste Victoria
- Owner: Cunard Line
- Acquired: 1920
- Fate: Sold to Canadian Pacific Steamships

Canada
- Name: RMS Empress of Scotland
- Owner: Canadian Pacific Steamships
- Acquired: 1921
- Fate: Scrapped in 1930 Blyth

General characteristics
- Type: Ocean liner
- Tonnage: 24,581 GRT, 14,847 NRT
- Length: 677.5 ft (206.5 m)
- Beam: 77.3 ft (23.6 m)
- Height: 200ft
- Propulsion: 2 steam engines, twin screws
- Speed: 17.5 knots (32.4 km/h; 20.1 mph)
- Capacity: 1,897 passengers

RMS Empress of Scotland, originally SS Kaiserin Auguste Victoria, was an ocean liner built in 1905–1906 by Vulcan AG shipyard in Stettin (now Szczecin, Poland) for the Hamburg America Line. The ship regularly sailed between Hamburg and New York City until the outbreak of war in Europe in 1914. At the end of hostilities, re-flagged as USS Kaiserin Auguste Victoria, she transported American troops from Europe to the United States. For a brief time Cunard sailed the re-flagged ship between Liverpool and New York.

The ship was refitted for Canadian Pacific Steamships (CP) and in 1921, she was renamed Empress of Scotland—the first of two CP ships to bear that name.

The vessel ended service in 1930 and was sold for scrap. During the demolition of the ship, the vessel caught fire, broke in two and sank. The hulls were raised and scrapped.

== Service history ==
Kaiserin Auguste Victoria was built by AG Vulcan Stettin in Stettin on the Baltic in 1905–1906. The new ship was ordered by the expanding Hamburg America Line. At 24,581 GRT, she was the largest passenger liner in the world from 1905 to 1907 until the advent of Cunard's Lusitania.

When the keel was laid down as "Ship #264," this vessel was intended to be named SS Europa; she was to have been a sister ship to SS Amerika which was being built by Harland and Wolff in Belfast during the same period. At the time of her launching on 29 August 1905, her only peer in size was the slightly smaller Amerika which had been launched days earlier.

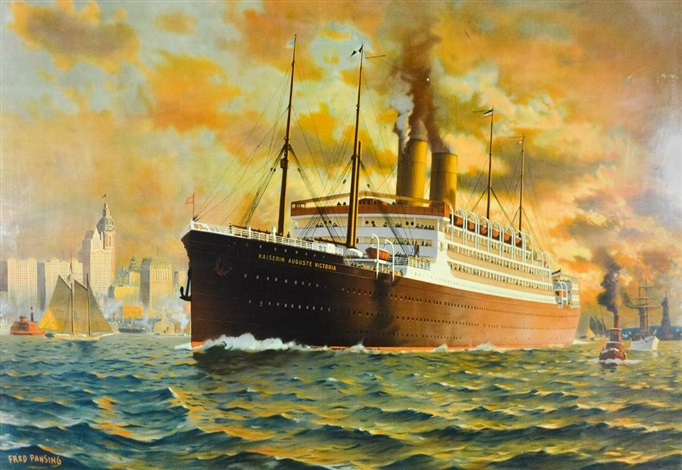
Kaiserin Auguste Victoria sailed under a German flag for eight years

German Empress Augusta Victoria of Schleswig-Holstein permitted the vessel to be named after her and participated in the launching ceremonies.

The vessel had a length of 677.5 feet (206.5 m), and her beam was 77.3 feet (23.6 m) with a gross register tonnage of 24,581, and a net register tonnage of 14,847. She had two funnels, four masts, twin propellers, and an average speed of 18 knots (33 km/h; 21 mph). The ocean liner provided accommodation for 472 first-class passengers and for 174 second class passengers. There was room for 212 third-class passengers and for 1,608 fourth-class passengers.

Kaiserin Auguste Victoria left Hamburg on 10 May 1906 on her maiden voyage to Dover, Cherbourg, and New York under the command of Captain Hans Ruser. Thereafter, she regularly sailed the route between Hamburg and New York.

In 1910 the ship was to be used in experiments for the world's first ship-to-shore airplane flights by pilot John McCurdy. A special platform was built on Kaiserin Auguste Victoria to provide a runway for McCurdy's plane. McCurdy abandoned the attempt when rival pilot Eugene Ely flew from the deck of USS Birmingham off Hampton Roads, Virginia in 1910. Kaiserin Auguste Victoria then returned to sailing on her regular schedule. A similar experiment using airplanes launched at sea to carry mail was carried out on SS Bremen twenty years later.

In June 1914, Kaiserin August Victoria made her last voyage under a German flag, sailing from Hamburg to Southampton, Cherbourg, and New York, and returning to Hamburg.

=== Interiors ===
Like her sister ship Amerika, the interiors of the Kaiserin Auguste Victoria were luxurious and included several cutting-edge amenities. The interiors were designed by the French architect Charles Mewès and the decoration entrusted to the English firm of Waring & Gillow, as had been the case with the Amerika. Like her older sister, the Kaiserin was installed with an elevator and offered an à la carte restaurant as an alternative to the main dining room. Both were complete novelties at the time. There was also a gymnasium, electric baths, massage rooms, a palm garden, children's playroom, music room, and a two-deck high smoking room.

=== World War I ===
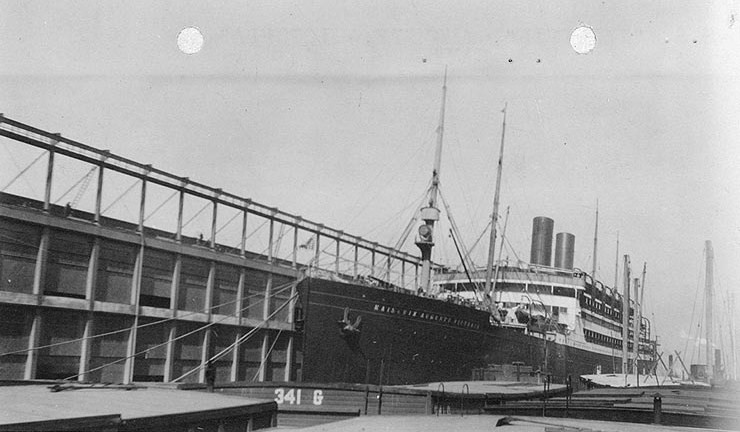
USS Kaiserin Auguste Victoria was commissioned in the US Navy as a troop transport after World War I

During World War I, Kaiserin Auguste Victoria stayed in the port of Hamburg starting in August 1914. In March 1919, she was surrendered to Britain. The ship was chartered by the United States Shipping Board, and USS Kaiserin Auguste Victoria carried American troops from France to the United States. The ship made five crossings bringing troops home from the war.

=== Post war ===
On 14 February 1920, the ship was decommissioned by the United States Navy and chartered to Cunard. SS Kaiserin Auguste Victoria sailed between Liverpool and New York although her time with Cunard would be very short, likely because they found her interior too dated and her design too top-heavy.

On 13 May 1921, the ship was sold to Canadian Pacific and was renamed Empress of Scotland. The ship was refitted to carry 459 first-class passengers, 478 second-class passengers, and 960 third-class passengers; it was converted to fuel oil at the same time.

On 22 January 1922, Empress of Scotland embarked on her first voyage from Southampton to New York. On 22 April 1922, she made her second trans-Atlantic voyage, sailing the Southampton-Cherbourg-Quebec route. On 14 June 1922 she transferred to the Hamburg-Southampton-Cherbourg-Quebec service. In 1923, she was involved in a collision with SS Bonus at Hamburg.

In 1926, Empress of Scotland was refitted again, this time with accommodations for first-class, second-class, tourist-class, and third-class passengers. In 1927, another refit resulted in first-class, tourist-class, and third-class accommodations. On 11 October 1930, Empress of Scotland made her last voyage from Southampton to Cherbourg and Quebec.

When the new Empress of Britain came into service, Empress of Scotland was sold for scrap. She was gutted by a fire at the shipbreaker's yard at Blyth on 10 December 1930. She broke in two and sank. Later the breaker's yard raised the pieces, and the full scrapping of the hulks was completed by 1933.

== See also ==
- List of ocean liners
- List of ships in British Columbia
