= 1484 Postrema =

Main-belt carbonaceous asteroid

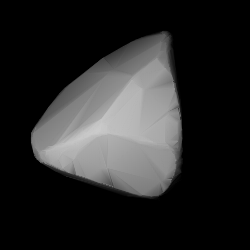
- Shape model of Postrema from its lightcurve

Discovery
- Discovered by: G. Neujmin
- Discovery site: Simeiz Obs.
- Discovery date: 29 April 1938

Designations
- Pronunciation: /pɒˈstriːmə/
- Named after: postrēma ("the last of a group")
- Alternative designations: 1938 HC · 1933 DH; A911 KC
- Minor planet category: main-belt · (middle); Postrema
- Adjectives: Postremian

Orbital characteristics
- Epoch 4 September 2017 (JD 2458000.5)
- Uncertainty parameter 0
- Observation arc: 84.61 yr (30,903 days)
- Aphelion: 3.2973 AU
- Perihelion: 2.1816 AU
- Semi-major axis: 2.7394 AU
- Eccentricity: 0.2036
- Orbital period (sidereal): 4.53 yr (1,656 days)
- Mean anomaly: 194.22°
- Mean motion: 0° 13^{m} 2.64^{s} / day
- Inclination: 17.300°
- Longitude of ascending node: 72.767°
- Argument of perihelion: 126.82°

Physical characteristics
- Dimensions: 34.696±1.954 km 38.82±6.78 km 40.871±0.279 km 41±4 km 41.1±8.2 km 41.73±12.60 km 43.18±1.0 km 43.42 km (derived); 47.00±0.62 km
- Synodic rotation period: 12.18978±0.00001 h 12.19±0.02 h 12.1923±0.0005 h
- Geometric albedo: 0.0137±0.001; 0.015±0.009; 0.035±0.001; 0.0367±0.0074; 0.0409 (derived); 0.05±0.01; 0.05±0.02; 0.05±0.04
- Spectral type: SMASS = B
- Absolute magnitude (H): 10.80 · 10.88 · 10.90 · 12.10

1484 Postrema, provisional designation 1938 HC, is a carbonaceous Postremian asteroid and namesake of the Postrema family from the central regions of the asteroid belt, approximately 41 kilometers in diameter. It was discovered on 29 April 1938, by Soviet astronomer Grigory Neujmin at the Simeiz Observatory on the Crimean peninsula. The name "Postrema" celebrates the astronomer's last minor planet discovery.

== Orbit and classification ==
Postrema is the parent body and namesake of the Postrema family (541), a mid-sized central asteroid family of little more than 100 members.

It orbits the Sun in the central main-belt at a distance of 2.2–3.3 AU once every 4 years and 6 months (1,656 days). Its orbit has an eccentricity of 0.20 and an inclination of 17° with respect to the ecliptic.

The asteroid was first identified as A911 KC at Johannesburg Observatory in May 1911. The body's observation arc begins with its identification as 1933 DH at Lowell Observatory in February 1933, more than 5 years prior to its official discovery observation at Simeiz.

== Physical characteristics ==
=== Spectral type ===
In the SMASS classification, Postrema is a bright carbonaceous B-type asteroid, while the overall spectral type of the Postrema family has been described as that of C- and X-type.

=== Rotation period ===
In May 2006, two rotational lightcurves of Postrema were independently obtained from photometric observations. Lightcurve analysis gave a rotation period of 12.19 and 12.1923 hours with a brightness amplitude of 0.23 and 0.22 magnitude, respectively (U=2+/3-).

=== Spin axis ===
The asteroids lightcurve has also been modeled, using photometric data from the Lowell Photometric Database and other sources. Modelling gave a concurring period of 12.18978 hours, as well as two spin axis of (19.0°, 44°) and (250.0°, 64°) in ecliptic coordinates (λ, β).

=== Diameter and albedo ===
According to the surveys carried out by the Infrared Astronomical Satellite IRAS, the Japanese Akari satellite and the NEOWISE mission of NASA's Wide-field Infrared Survey Explorer, Postrema measures between 34.696 and 47.00 kilometers in diameter and its surface has a notably low albedo between 0.0137 and 0.05.

The Collaborative Asteroid Lightcurve Link derives an albedo of 0.0409 and a diameter of 43.42 kilometers based on an absolute magnitude of 10.9.

== Naming ==
This minor planet was named "Postrema", which means "the last of a group". It celebrates Grigory Neujmin's last numbered minor planet discovery. The official naming citation was published by the Minor Planet Center in June 1955 (M.P.C. 1252).

The citation only holds true at the time of publication. In retrospect, Postrema is not Neujmin's last discovery, neither by number nor by its discovery date. These would be the asteroids 4420 Alandreev (highest numbered) and 2536 Kozyrev, officially discovered on 15 August 1939, more than a year after Postrema.
