= Biarmia =

Biarmia or Bjarmia:

- Bjarmaland, historical country
- 1146 Biarmia, asteroid
- Biarmia, poem
