= 1135 Colchis =

Main-belt asteroid

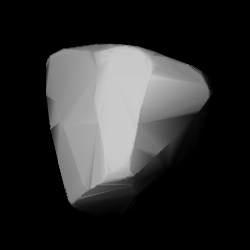
- Shape model of Colchis from its lightcurve

Discovery
- Discovered by: G. Neujmin
- Discovery site: Simeiz Obs.
- Discovery date: 3 October 1929

Designations
- Pronunciation: /ˈkɒlkɪs/
- Named after: Colchis (ancient Kingdom)
- Alternative designations: 1929 TA · 1936 FJ_{1} 1940 EP · 1954 LL; 1958 FO · A911 MJ; A916 UH
- Minor planet category: main-belt · (middle); background

Orbital characteristics
- Epoch 4 September 2017 (JD 2458000.5)
- Uncertainty parameter 0
- Observation arc: 88.15 yr (32,198 days)
- Aphelion: 2.9744 AU
- Perihelion: 2.3558 AU
- Semi-major axis: 2.6651 AU
- Eccentricity: 0.1160
- Orbital period (sidereal): 4.35 yr (1,589 days)
- Mean anomaly: 87.849°
- Mean motion: 0° 13^{m} 35.4^{s} / day
- Inclination: 4.5409°
- Longitude of ascending node: 350.73°
- Argument of perihelion: 3.6675°

Physical characteristics
- Mean diameter: 45.341±12.31 km 46.82±0.65 km 47.07±13.06 km 49.12±16.46 km 49.805±0.795 km 50.50 km (derived); 50.592±0.953 km 50.64±1.5 km
- Synodic rotation period: 23.41±1.090 h 23.47±0.01 h 23.47±0.05 h 23.4827±0.0001 h 23.4830±0.0005 h
- Pole ecliptic latitude: (139.0°, −58.0°) (λ_{1}/β_{1}); (330.0°, −81.0°) (λ_{2}/β_{2})
- Geometric albedo: 0.0437 (derived); 0.05±0.03; 0.0532±0.0329; 0.057±0.010; 0.0573±0.004; 0.0592±0.0083; 0.068±0.002
- Spectral type: SMASS =Xk · P
- Absolute magnitude (H): 10.20 · 10.260±0.180 (R) · 10.50 · 10.64

1135 Colchis (/ˈkɒlkɪs/); prov. designation: 1929 TA) is a background asteroid from the central region of the asteroid belt. It was discovered on 3 October 1929, by Soviet astronomer Grigory Neujmin at the Simeiz Observatory on the Crimean peninsula. The X-type asteroid has a rotation period of hours 23.5 and measures approximately 49 kilometers (30 miles) in diameter. It was named for the ancient Kingdom of Colchis.

== Orbit and classification ==
Colchis is a non-family asteroid of the main belt's background population when applying the hierarchical clustering method to its proper orbital elements. It orbits the Sun in the central main-belt at a distance of 2.4–3.0 AU once every 4 years and 4 months (1,589 days; semi-major axis 2.67 AU). Its orbit has an eccentricity of 0.12 and an inclination of 5° with respect to the ecliptic. The asteroid was first observed as A911 MJ at Johannesburg Observatory in June 1911. The body's observation arc begins at Lowell Observatory in September 1929, or four days prior its official discovery observation at Simeiz.

== Naming ==
This minor planet was named after the ancient Kingdom of Colchis, bordering on Black Sea south of the Caucasus mountains, in what is now part of Georgia. The naming was mentioned in The Names of the Minor Planets by Paul Herget in 1955 (H 106).

== Physical characteristics ==
In the SMASS classification, Colchis is a Xk-subtype that transitions between the X- and K-type asteroids. Conversely, the Wide-field Infrared Survey Explorer characterizes it as a primitive P-type asteroid.

=== Rotation period ===
In March 2001, a rotational lightcurve of Colchis was obtained from photometric observations by Robert Stephens. Lightcurve analysis gave a rotation period of 23.47 hours with a brightness variation of 0.45 magnitude (U=2). In September 2016, French amateur astronomer Patrick Sogorb measured an identical period and an amplitude of 0.46 magnitude (U=2). A similar period of 23.41 hours with an amplitude of 0.33 magnitude was obtained by astronomers at the Palomar Transient Factory in January 2014.

=== Poles ===
In 2016, two modeled lightcurves using photometric data from the Lowell Photometric Database (LPD) and other sources, gave a concurring period of 23.4827 and 23.4830 hours, respectively. Each modeled lightcurve also determined two spin axis of (139.0°, −58.0°) and (330.0°, −81.0°), as well as (7.0°, −54.0°) and (168.0°, −56.0°) in ecliptic coordinates (λ, β), respectively.

=== Diameter and albedo ===
According to the surveys carried out by the Infrared Astronomical Satellite IRAS, the Japanese Akari satellite and the NEOWISE mission of NASA's WISE telescope, Colchis measures between 45.341 and 50.64 kilometers in diameter and its surface has an albedo between 0.05 and 0.068.

The Collaborative Asteroid Lightcurve Link derives an albedo of 0.0437 and a diameter of 50.50 kilometers based on an absolute magnitude of 10.5.
