= 748 Simeïsa =

Hilda asteroid

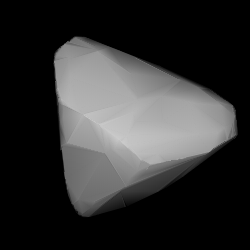
- Modelled shape of Simeïsa from its lightcurve

Discovery
- Discovered by: G. Neujmin
- Discovery site: Simeiz Obs.
- Discovery date: 14 March 1913

Designations
- Named after: Simeiz/Simeiz Obs. (Town and Observatory)
- Alternative designations: A913 EL · 1925 QG; 1936 BG · 1941 SU; 1942 XU · 1944 DC; 1951 CX · 1957 UL_{1} 1963 MC · 1913 RD
- Minor planet category: main-belt · (outer); Hilda

Orbital characteristics
- Epoch 31 May 2020 (JD 2459000.5)
- Uncertainty parameter 0
- Observation arc: 99.96 yr (36,509 d)
- Aphelion: 4.6898 AU
- Perihelion: 3.2045 AU
- Semi-major axis: 3.9472 AU
- Eccentricity: 0.1881
- Orbital period (sidereal): 7.84 yr (2,864 d)
- Mean anomaly: 324.14°
- Mean motion: 0° 7^{m} 32.52^{s} / day
- Inclination: 2.2587°
- Longitude of ascending node: 265.46°
- Argument of perihelion: 177.73°
- Jupiter MOID: 0.5637 AU
- T_{Jupiter}: 3.0280

Physical characteristics
- Dimensions: (109.7 km × 93.2 km)
- Mean diameter: 102.97±2.2 km; 103.725±1.034 km; 111.75±2.31 km
- Synodic rotation period: 11.919±0.002 h
- Geometric albedo: 0.035±0.002; 0.0415±0.002; 0.041±0.007
- Spectral type: Tholen = P; X (SDSS-MOC); B–V = 0.694±0.014; U–B = 0.206±0.035
- Absolute magnitude (H): 9.0; 9.01

748 Simeïsa (prov. designation: A913 EL or 1913 RD) is a very large Hilda asteroid from the outermost regions of the asteroid belt, approximately 104 kilometers (65 miles) in diameter. It was discovered on 14 March 1913, by Russian astronomer Grigory Neujmin at the Simeiz Observatory on the Crimean peninsula. The dark P-type asteroid has a rotation period of 11.9 hours and a shape that is reminiscent of a tetrahedron. It was the first asteroid discovery made in Russia and named after the discovering observatory and its nearby Crimean town, Simeiz.

== Orbit and classification ==
Simeïsa is a member of the distant orbital Hilda group of asteroids, which stay in a 3:2 orbital resonance with the gas giant Jupiter. It is however not a member of the collisional Hilda family (001) but a non-family asteroid of the background population when applying the hierarchical clustering method to its proper orbital elements. It orbits the Sun in the outermost asteroid belt at a distance of 3.2–4.7 AU once every 7 years and 10 months (2,864 days; semi-major axis of 3.95 AU). Its orbit has an eccentricity of 0.19 and an inclination of 2° with respect to the ecliptic. The body's observation arc begins at the Heidelberg Observatory on 19 February 1920, almost 7 years after its official discovery observation by Grigory Neujmin at Simeiz.

== Naming ==
This minor planet was named after the discovering Simeiz Observatory and its nearby Crimean town, Simeiz. Simeïsa was the first minor planet discovered in Russia. The naming citation was mentioned in The Names of the Minor Planets by Paul Herget in 1955 (H 75).

== Physical characteristics ==
In the Tholen classification, Simeïsa is a dark and primitive P-type asteroid, which are common in the outer regions of asteroid belt and among the Jupiter trojan population. In the SDSS-based taxonomy, it is an X-type asteroid.

=== Rotation period ===
In October 2011, a rotational lightcurve of Simeïsa was obtained from photometric observations by French amateur astronomer René Roy. Lightcurve analysis gave a rotation period of (11.919±0.002) hours with a brightness variation of (0.36±0.03) magnitude (U=2). In the 1990s, Mats Dahlgren already determined a period of 11.88 hours with an amplitude of 0.22 magnitude (U=2).

=== Diameter and albedo ===
According to the surveys carried out by the Infrared Astronomical Satellite IRAS, the NEOWISE mission of NASA's Wide-field Infrared Survey Explorer (WISE), and the Japanese Akari satellite, Simeïsa measures (102.97±2.2), (103.725±1.034) and (111.75±2.31) kilometers in diameter and its surface has a low albedo of (0.0415±0.002), (0.041±0.007) and (0.035±0.002), respectively.

The Collaborative Asteroid Lightcurve Link assumes an albedo of 0.0376 and derives a diameter of 102.79 kilometers based on an absolute magnitude of 9.12. Alternative mean diameter measurements published by the WISE team include (103.714±1.128 km) and (109.069±38.907 km) with corresponding albedos of (0.041±0.007) and (0.045±0.027).

Two asteroid occultations on 4 March 1999 and 7 January 2006, gave a best-fit ellipse dimension of (106.0 km × 106.0 km) and (109.7 km × 93.2 km), respectively, each with a quality rating of 2. These timed observations are taken when the asteroid passes in front of a distant star.
