= 1307 Cimmeria =

Main-belt asteroid

Discovery
- Discovered by: G. Neujmin
- Discovery site: Simeiz Obs.
- Discovery date: 17 October 1930

Designations
- Pronunciation: /sɪˈmɪəriə/
- Named after: Cimmerians (ancient people of Crimea)
- Alternative designations: 1930 UF · 1933 QF_{1}
- Minor planet category: main-belt · (inner)

Orbital characteristics
- Epoch 16 February 2017 (JD 2457800.5)
- Uncertainty parameter 0
- Observation arc: 85.74 yr (31,315 days)
- Aphelion: 2.4689 AU
- Perihelion: 2.0316 AU
- Semi-major axis: 2.2503 AU
- Eccentricity: 0.0972
- Orbital period (sidereal): 3.38 yr (1,233 days)
- Mean anomaly: 157.34°
- Mean motion: 0° 17^{m} 31.2^{s} / day
- Inclination: 3.9506°
- Longitude of ascending node: 233.87°
- Argument of perihelion: 207.34°

Physical characteristics
- Dimensions: 7.85±1.78 km 9.26±1.15 km 9.419±0.051 km 10.058±0.059 km 10.54 km (calculated)
- Synodic rotation period: 2.820±0.005 h 2.821±0.001 h (Note: Klinglesmith (2013) web: observation by Daniel Klinglesmith from April 2013, with a rotation period 2.821±0.001 hours with a brightness amplitude of 0.29 magnitude. Summary figures at Collaborative Asteroid Lightcurve Link (CALL) for (1307) Cimmeria.); 2.820723±0.000005 h
- Geometric albedo: 0.20 (assumed); 0.2218±0.0175; 0.251±0.047; 0.28±0.11; 0.371±0.337
- Spectral type: Tholen = S · S B–V = 0.876; U–B = 0.550
- Absolute magnitude (H): 11.86 · 12.24±0.67 · 12.25 · 12.69

1307 Cimmeria, provisional designation 1930 UF, is a stony asteroid from the inner regions of the asteroid belt, approximately 10 kilometers in diameter. It was discovered on 17 October 1930, by Soviet astronomer Grigory Neujmin at Simeiz Observatory on the Crimean peninsula, and later named after the Cimmerians, the ancient people of Crimea.

== Orbit and classification ==
Cimmeria orbits the Sun in the inner main-belt at a distance of 2.0–2.5 AU once every 3 years and 5 months (1,233 days). Its orbit has an eccentricity of 0.10 and an inclination of 4° with respect to the ecliptic. The first unused observation was made at the Lowell Observatory the night before its discovery. The body's observation arc begins at the discovering observatory, the night after its official discovery observation.

== Physical characteristics ==
On the Tholen taxonomy, Cimmeria is a common stony S-type asteroid.

=== Rotation and pole ===
In September 2004, the best rated rotational lightcurve of Cimmeria was obtained from photometric observations by American astronomer Brian Warner at his Palmer Divide Observatory in Colorado. Lightcurve analysis gave a well-define rotation period of 2.820 hours with a brightness amplitude of 0.31 magnitude (U=3). Astronomer Daniel Klinglesmith obtained a similar period of 2.821 hours with an amplitude of 0.29 magnitude.

In addition a modeled lightcurve, using photometric data from various sources, gave a period of 2.820723 hours, as well as a spin axis of (63.0°, n.a.) in ecliptic coordinates (U=n.a.).

=== Diameter and albedo ===
According to the survey carried out by NASA's Wide-field Infrared Survey Explorer with its subsequent NEOWISE mission, Cimmeria measures between 7.85 and 10.058 kilometers in diameter and its surface has an albedo between 0.2218 and 0.371, while the Collaborative Asteroid Lightcurve Link assumes a standard albedo for stony asteroids of 0.20 and calculates a diameter of 10.54 kilometers with an absolute magnitude of 12.25.

== Naming ==
This minor planet was named after the Cimmerians, ancient inhabitants of the Crimea peninsula expelled by the Scythians in the 7th century B.C. (also see the preceding asteroid 1306 Scythia). The official naming citation is based on a private communications between the author of the Dictionary of Minor Planet Names, Lutz Schmadel, and Soviet–Moldavian astronomer Alexander Deutsch.
