= 814 Tauris =

Dark and very large background asteroid

Discovery
- Discovered by: G. Neujmin
- Discovery site: Simeiz Obs.
- Discovery date: 2 January 1916

Designations
- Pronunciation: /ˈtɔːrɪs/
- Named after: Crimea, (peninsula on the Black Sea in Eastern Europe)
- Alternative designations: A916 AE · 1927 BA; A907 JE · 1916 YT
- Minor planet category: main-belt · (outer); background

Orbital characteristics
- Epoch 31 May 2020 (JD 2459000.5)
- Uncertainty parameter 0
- Observation arc: 104.01 yr (37,990 d)
- Aphelion: 4.1233 AU
- Perihelion: 2.1884 AU
- Semi-major axis: 3.1558 AU
- Eccentricity: 0.3065
- Orbital period (sidereal): 5.61 yr (2,048 d)
- Mean anomaly: 247.26°
- Mean motion: 0° 10^{m} 32.88^{s} / day
- Inclination: 21.822°
- Longitude of ascending node: 88.786°
- Argument of perihelion: 296.53°
- T_{Jupiter}: 3.0250

Physical characteristics
- Dimensions: 109.0 km × 109.0 km
- Mean diameter: 102.229±2.138 km; 109.56±3.1 km; 109.76±2.78 km; 112±9 km; 113±9 km
- Mass: (9.74 ± 5.16/3.17)×10^{17} kg (1.09±0.42)×10^{18} kg (Note: Calculated from its standard gravitational parameter GM = 0.073±0.028 km^{3}/s^{2}.)
- Mean density: 1.74 ± 0.923/0.566 g/cm^{3} 1.94 g/cm^{3} (Note: Assuming a diameter of 102 km.)
- Synodic rotation period: 35.8 h 36.081±30% h
- Geometric albedo: 0.047±0.003; 0.054±0.011
- Spectral type: Tholen = C; SMASS = C; X (S3OS2); B–V = 0.701±0.009; U–B = 0.316±0.023; V–R = 0.402±0.011
- Absolute magnitude (H): 8.74; 8.8; 8.77

814 Tauris (prov. designation: A916 AE or 1916 YT) is a dark and very large background asteroid, approximately 109 kilometers (68 miles) in diameter, located the outer regions of the asteroid belt. It was discovered on 2 January 1916, by astronomer Russian Grigory Neujmin at the Simeiz Observatory on Crimea. The carbonaceous C-type asteroid has a longer-than average rotation period of 35.8 hours. It was named after the ancient name of the Crimean peninsula where the discovering observatory is located.

== Orbit and classification ==
Tauris is a non-family asteroid of the main belt's background population when applying the hierarchical clustering method to its proper orbital elements. It orbits the Sun in the outer main-belt at a distance of 2.2–4.1 AU once every 5 years and 7 months (2,048 days; semi-major axis of 3.16 AU). Its orbit has a notably high eccentricity of 0.31 and an inclination of 22° with respect to the ecliptic. This gives it a T_{Jupiter} of 3.0250, near the boundary of 3, which separates asteroids (above 3) from the Jupiter-family comets (below 3). Tauris was first observed as A907 JE at Taunton Observatory (803) on 12 May 1907. The body's observation arc begins at Heidelberg Observatory on 30 January 1916, or four weeks after its official discovery observation at Simeiz Observatory.

== Naming ==
This minor planet was named after the ancient name of the Crimean peninsula, Tauris. Lutz Schmadel, the author of the Dictionary of Minor Planet Names also mentions a mountain with the same name on the southwest coast of Crimea. In addition, Baltic German astronomer Ludwig von Struve (1858–1920) also taught astronomy at the Tavrida University (Tauris University) in Simferopol, a large city on the Crimean peninsula (R. Bremer). The naming was also mentioned in The Names of the Minor Planets by Paul Herget in 1955 (H 81).

== Physical characteristics ==
In the Tholen classification as well in the Bus–Binzel SMASS classification, Tauris is a common, carbonaceous C-type asteroid, while in both the Tholen- and SMASS-like taxonomy of the Small Solar System Objects Spectroscopic Survey (S3OS2), it is an X-type asteroid.

=== Rotation period ===
In 1983, a rotational lightcurve of Tauris, obtained from photometric observations with the ESO 0.5-metre telescope at La Silla, Chile, was by published by Belgian astronomer Henri Debehogne in collaboration with Italian astronomers Giovanni de Sanctis and Vincenzo Zappalà. Lightcurve analysis gave a rotation period of 35.8 hours with a brightness variation of 0.20 magnitude (U=2). In May 2013, Michael S. Alkema at the Elephant Head Observatory (G35) in Arizona determined an identical period of 35.8±0.1 hours with an amplitude of 0.18±0.03 magnitude (U=2–).

=== Diameter and albedo ===
According to the surveys carried out by the NEOWISE mission of NASA's Wide-field Infrared Survey Explorer, the Infrared Astronomical Satellite IRAS, and the Japanese Akari satellite, Tauris measures (102.229±2.138), (109.56±3.1) and (109.76±2.78) kilometers in diameter and its surface has an albedo of (0.054±0.011), (0.0470±0.003) and (0.047±0.003), respectively. The Collaborative Asteroid Lightcurve Link adopts the results obtained by IRAS, that is, an albedo of 0.0470 and a diameter of 109.56 kilometers based on an absolute magnitude of 8.74. Alternative mean-diameter measurements published by the WISE team include (98.77±33.90 km), (104.357±28.04 km), (109.854±1.947 km) and (121.55±44.26 km) with corresponding albedos of (0.05±0.05), (0.0445±0.0344), (0.0444±0.0066) and (0.036±0.015).

Several asteroid occultations of Tauris were observed between 1999 and 2015. These timed observations are taken when the asteroid passes in front of a distant star. The two best-rated observations made on 26 and 29 July 2015, gave a best-fit ellipse dimension of (109.0 km × 109.0 km) and (110.0 km × 110.0 km), respectively. However, these two observations still received a relatively poor quality rating.
