= 779 Nina =

Main-belt asteroid

Discovery
- Discovered by: G. Neujmin
- Discovery site: Simeiz Obs.
- Discovery date: 25 January 1914

Designations
- Named after: Nina Neujmina (Discoverer's sister)
- Alternative designations: A914 BH · A908 YB; A912 TE · 1914 UB
- Minor planet category: main-belt · (middle); background

Orbital characteristics
- Epoch 31 May 2020 (JD 2459000.5)
- Uncertainty parameter 0
- Observation arc: 103.51 yr (37,806 d)
- Aphelion: 3.2707 AU
- Perihelion: 2.0571 AU
- Semi-major axis: 2.6639 AU
- Eccentricity: 0.2278
- Orbital period (sidereal): 4.35 yr (1,588 d)
- Mean anomaly: 301.50°
- Mean motion: 0° 13^{m} 36.12^{s} / day
- Inclination: 14.582°
- Longitude of ascending node: 283.74°
- Argument of perihelion: 49.126°

Physical characteristics
- Dimensions: 79.9 km × 79.9 km
- Mean diameter: 77±7 km (composite estimate) Individual estimates: 76.62±4.0 km; 80.572±2.220 km; 81.27±1.00 km
- Synodic rotation period: 11.186 h
- Geometric albedo: 0.15±0.02 (composite estimate) Individual estimates: 0.132±0.004; 0.1440±0.016; 0.157±0.022
- Spectral type: SMASS = X; X (S3OS2); M (Belskaya)
- Absolute magnitude (H): 7.9; 8.10; 8.30

779 Nina (prov. designation: A914 BH or 1914 UB) is a large background asteroid, approximately 80 kilometers (50 miles) in diameter, located in the central region of the asteroid belt. It was discovered on 25 January 1914, by Russian astronomer Grigory Neujmin (1886–1946) at the Simeiz Observatory on the Crimean peninsula. The metallic X-type asteroid with an intermediate albedo has a rotation period of 11.2 hours. It was named after the discoverer's sister, Nina Neujmina (Tsentilovich) (1889–1971).

== Orbit and classification ==
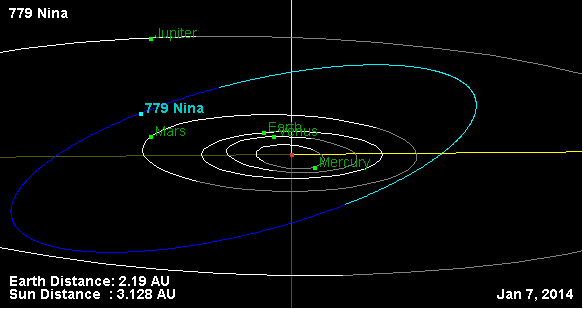
Orbital diagram of Nina

Nina is a non-family asteroid of the main belt's background population when applying the hierarchical clustering method to its proper orbital elements. It orbits the Sun in the central main-belt at a distance of 2.1–3.3 AU once every 4 years and 4 months (1,588 days; semi-major axis of 2.66 AU). Its orbit has an eccentricity of 0.23 and an inclination of 15° with respect to the ecliptic. The body's was first observed as A908 YB and A912 TE at Heidelberg Observatory on 16 December 1908 and 14 October 1912, respectively. The observation arc begins at Vienna Observatory on 31 July 1916, more than two years after to its official discovery observation at Simeiz Observatory on Crimea.

== Naming ==
This minor planet was named after Nina Nikolaevna Neujmina (Tsentilovich) (1889–1971), mathematician and sister of Russian discoverer Grigory Neujmin (1886–1946).

== Physical characteristics ==
In the Bus–Binzel SMASS classification, Nina is an X-type asteroid. It is also an X-type in both the Tholen- and SMASS-like taxonomy of the Small Solar System Objects Spectroscopic Survey (S3OS2). Belskaya classifies Nina as a metallic M-type asteroid, which is the equivalent spectral type in the Tholen taxonomy for X-types with an intermediate albedo (see below).

=== Rotation period ===
In June 1981, a rotational lightcurve of Nina was obtained from photometric observations by Alan Harris at the Table Mountain and Lowell observatories. Lightcurve analysis gave a rotation period of 11.186 hours with a brightness variation of 0.25 magnitude (U=3). It was confirmed by Brian Warner at his Palmer Divide Observatory (716) in Colorado in January 2009, who determined a period of 11.17±0.01 hours with an amplitude of 0.32±0.02 magnitude (U=3). (Note: Lightcurve plot of (779) Nina, Palmer Divide Observatory, Brian Warner (2009). Rotation period 11.17±0.01 hours with a brightness amplitude of 0.32±0.02 mag. Quality code is 3. Summary figures at the LCDB.) In September 2012, French amateur astronomer Gérald Rousseau obtained a period of 11.556±0.002 hours with an amplitude of 0.06 magnitude (U=2+).

=== Diameter and albedo ===
According to the surveys carried out by the Infrared Astronomical Satellite IRAS, the NEOWISE mission of NASA's Wide-field Infrared Survey Explorer (WISE), and the Japanese Akari satellite, Nina measures (76.62±4.0), (80.572±2.220) and (81.27±1.00) kilometers in diameter and its surface has an albedo of (0.1440±0.016), (0.157±0.022) and (0.132±0.004), respectively. The Collaborative Asteroid Lightcurve Link adopts Petr Pravec's revised WISE-albedo of 0.1694 and takes a diameter of 77.46 kilometers based on an absolute magnitude of 8.1. The WISE team also published an alternative mean-diameter of (77.000±6.578 km) with an albedo of (0.1740±0.0559). On 10 November 2005, an asteroid occultation of Nina gave a best-fit ellipse dimension of (79.9 km × 79.9 km), with a quality rating of 2. These timed observations are taken when the asteroid passes in front of a distant star.
