= 917 Lyka =

Background asteroid

Discovery
- Discovered by: G. Neujmin
- Discovery site: Simeiz Obs.
- Discovery date: 5 September 1915

Designations
- Named after: Lyka, a friend of the discoverer's sister
- Alternative designations: A915 RR · 1950 BS; 1951 JJ · 1915 S4; 1915 Σ4
- Minor planet category: main-belt · (inner) background

Orbital characteristics
- Epoch 31 May 2020 (JD 2459000.5)
- Uncertainty parameter 0
- Observation arc: 100.18 yr (36,591 d)
- Aphelion: 2.8590 AU
- Perihelion: 1.9035 AU
- Semi-major axis: 2.3812 AU
- Eccentricity: 0.2006
- Orbital period (sidereal): 3.67 yr (1,342 d)
- Mean anomaly: 181.91°
- Mean motion: 0° 16^{m} 5.52^{s} / day
- Inclination: 5.1264°
- Longitude of ascending node: 343.38°
- Argument of perihelion: 359.90°

Physical characteristics
- Mean diameter: 28.10±3.9 km; 31.29±0.49 km; 34.878±0.184 km
- Synodic rotation period: 7.867±0.006 h
- Geometric albedo: 0.056±0.008; 0.072±0.003; 0.0891±0.031
- Spectral type: X (S3OS2)
- Absolute magnitude (H): 11.6

917 Lyka (prov. designation: A915 RR or 1915 S4) is a background asteroid, approximately 32 kilometers (20 miles) in diameter, located in the inner region of the asteroid belt. It was discovered on 5 September 1915, by Russian astronomer Grigory Neujmin at the Simeiz Observatory on the Crimean peninsula. The X-type asteroid has a rotation period of 7.9 hours and is likely spherical in shape. It was named after Lyka, a friend of the discoverer's sister.

== Orbit and classification ==
Lyka is a non-family asteroid of the main belt's background population when applying the hierarchical clustering method to its proper orbital elements. It orbits the Sun in the inner main-belt at a distance of 1.9–2.9 AU once every 3 years and 8 months (1,342 days; semi-major axis of 2.38 AU). Its orbit has an eccentricity of 0.20 and an inclination of 5° with respect to the ecliptic. The body's observation arc begins at Simeiz on 1 September 1926, eleven years after to its official discovery observation.

== Naming ==
This minor planet was named after Lyka, a friend of the sister of discoverer Grigory Neujmin. Lutz Schmadel, the author of the Dictionary of Minor Planet Names learned about the meaning of the asteroid's name from private communications with long-time Simeiz astronomer Nikolai Chernykh.

== Physical characteristics ==
In both the Tholen- and SMASS-like taxonomy of the Small Solar System Objects Spectroscopic Survey (S3OS2), Lyka is an X-type asteroid.

=== Rotation period ===
In January 2005, a rotational lightcurve of Lyka was obtained from photometric observations by Matthieu Conjat. Lightcurve analysis gave a well-defined rotation period of 7.867±0.006 hours with a low brightness variation of 0.17±0.02 magnitude, indicative of a rather spherical shape (U=3). In October 2018, the period was confirmed by Laurent Bernasconi (7.8838±0.0003 h) and by Alfonso Carreño of OBAS (7.889±0.007 h) with amplitudes of 0.12±0.01 and 0.26±0.03, respectively (U=3/3).

=== Diameter and albedo ===
According to the survey carried out by the Infrared Astronomical Satellite IRAS, the Japanese Akari satellite, and the NEOWISE mission of NASA's WISE telescope (WISE), Lyka measures (28.10±3.9), (31.29±0.49) and (34.878±0.184) kilometers in diameter and its surface has an albedo of (0.0891±0.031), (0.072±0.003) and (0.056±0.008), respectively. The Collaborative Asteroid Lightcurve Link derives an albedo of 0.0520 and a diameter of 27.89 km based on an absolute magnitude of 11.6. Further published mean-diameters by the WISE team include (21.60±4.99 km), (26.65±9.28 km), (34.789±2.565 km) and (37.843±0.227 km) with albedos between (0.026±0.009) and (0.05±0.02). An asteroid occultation, observed on 4 March 2005, gave a best-fit ellipse dimension of 28.0×28.0 kilometers. These timed observations are taken when the asteroid passes in front of a distant star. However the quality of the measurement is rated poorly.
