= 789 Lena =

Main-Belt Asteroid

Discovery
- Discovered by: G. Neujmin
- Discovery site: Simeiz Obs.
- Discovery date: 24 June 1914

Designations
- Pronunciation: /ˈleɪnə/
- Named after: Elena Neujmina (discoverer's family)
- Alternative designations: 1914 UU · 1970 CE
- Minor planet category: main-belt · (middle)

Orbital characteristics
- Epoch 16 February 2017 (JD 2457800.5)
- Uncertainty parameter 0
- Observation arc: 81.69 yr (29,837 days)
- Aphelion: 3.0817 AU
- Perihelion: 2.2907 AU
- Semi-major axis: 2.6862 AU
- Eccentricity: 0.1472
- Orbital period (sidereal): 4.40 yr (1,608 days)
- Mean anomaly: 110.02°
- Mean motion: 0° 13^{m} 26.04^{s} / day
- Inclination: 10.781°
- Longitude of ascending node: 232.62°
- Argument of perihelion: 44.006°

Physical characteristics
- Dimensions: 20.56±0.34 km 22.483±0.306; 23.871±0.162 km 24.18 km (calculated)
- Synodic rotation period: 5.84239±0.00001 h 5.848±0.001 h 5.85±0.05 h 22 h
- Geometric albedo: 0.10 (assumed); 0.1373±0.0147; 0.153±0.028; 0.186±0.007
- Spectral type: SMASS = X · M · X
- Absolute magnitude (H): 10.47±0.60 · 10.9 · 11.2

789 Lena, provisional designation 1914 UU, is a metallic asteroid from the middle region of the asteroid belt, approximately 24 kilometers in diameter. It was discovered on 24 June 1914, by Soviet–Russian astronomer Grigory Neujmin at Simeiz Observatory on the Crimean peninsula, and named after the discoverer's mother.

== Orbit and classification ==
Lena orbits the Sun in the middle main-belt at a distance of 2.3–3.1 AU once every 4 years and 5 months (1,608 days). Its orbit has an eccentricity of 0.15 and an inclination of 11° with respect to the ecliptic. Lena's observation arc begins with its first used observation made at Yerkes Observatory in 1935, or 21 years after its official discovery observation at Simeiz.

== Physical characteristics ==
In the SMASS taxonomy, Lena is an X-type asteroid. It has also been characterized as a metallic M-type asteroid by NASA's Wide-field Infrared Survey Explorer (WISE).

=== Rotation period ===
In August and September 2007, two reliable lightcurves were obtained by Italian astronomer Silvano Casulli and by members at the U.S.Oakley Observatory. Lightcurve analysis gave a period of 5.848±0.001 and 5.85±0.05 hours, with a brightness variation of 0.50 and of 0.40 magnitude, respectively (U=3/2+). (Note: The Collaborative Asteroid Lightcurve Link (CALL) assigns a quality code to light-curve observations, ranging from 0 ("result later proven incorrect") to 3 ("secure result within the precision given and no ambiguity"). The 1993-lightcurve obtained at the Félix Aguilar Observatory was rated "0", while CALL tags the more recent 2007-observations with a quality code of "2+" and "3", respectively. Summary figures at Collaborative Asteroid Lightcurve Link (CALL) for (789) Lena)

In 1993, a rotational lightcurve which was later proven incorrect, was obtained from photometric observations at the Félix Aguilar Observatory, Argentina. It gave an unusual lightcurve, indicating a very irregular shape and/or a relatively long rotation period of 22 hours with an exceptionally high amplitude of 1.5 in magnitude (U=0).

=== Diameter and albedo ===
According to the space-based surveys carried out by the Japanese Akari satellite and the NEOWISE mission of the WISE telescope, Lena measures between 20.6 and 23.9 kilometers in diameter, and its surface has an albedo of 0.137–0.186. The Collaborative Asteroid Lightcurve Link assumes a much lower albedo of 0.10 and calculates a diameter of 24.2 kilometer, as the lower the albedo (reflectivity), the larger a body's diameter, at a constant absolute magnitude (brightness).

== Naming ==
This minor planet was named in honor of Elena ("Lena") Petrovna Neujmina (1860–1942), mother of the discovering astronomer Grigory Neujmin.
