= Tiflis (disambiguation) =

Tiflis may refer to:

- A former official exonym of Tbilisi, Georgia
- Tiflis Governorate, a province of the Russian Empire
- 753 Tiflis, a minor planet orbiting the Sun
