= 830 Petropolitana =

Bright background asteroid

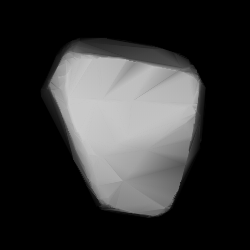
- Lightcurve-modeled shape of Petropolitana

Discovery
- Discovered by: G. Neujmin
- Discovery site: Simeiz Obs.
- Discovery date: 25 August 1916

Designations
- Pronunciation: /pɪˌtrɒpəlɪˈteɪnə/
- Named after: Saint Petersburg (Russian city)
- Alternative designations: A916 QE · 1933 RK; 1949 KW · A917 YD; 1916 ZZ · 1917 Σgb
- Minor planet category: main-belt · (outer); background

Orbital characteristics
- Epoch 31 May 2020 (JD 2459000.5)
- Uncertainty parameter 0
- Observation arc: 103.34 yr (37,745 d)
- Aphelion: 3.4169 AU
- Perihelion: 3.0002 AU
- Semi-major axis: 3.2085 AU
- Eccentricity: 0.0649
- Orbital period (sidereal): 5.75 yr (2,099 d)
- Mean anomaly: 297.36°
- Mean motion: 0° 10^{m} 17.4^{s} / day
- Inclination: 3.8028°
- Longitude of ascending node: 340.28°
- Argument of perihelion: 90.940°

Physical characteristics
- Mean diameter: 41.22±1.6 km; 41.328±0.131 km; 48.47±0.92 km
- Synodic rotation period: 169.52±0.06 h
- Pole ecliptic latitude: (217.0°, 36.0°) (λ_{1}/β_{1}); (34.0°, 41.0°) (λ_{2}/β_{2})
- Geometric albedo: 0.174±0.008; 0.216±0.049; 0.2382±0.020
- Spectral type: Tholen = S; B–V = 0.899±0.010; U–B = 0.500±0.020
- Absolute magnitude (H): 9.10

830 Petropolitana (prov. designation: A916 QE or 1916 ZZ) is a bright background asteroid from the outer regions of the asteroid belt. It was discovered on 25 August 1916, by Russian astronomer Grigory Neujmin at the Simeiz Observatory on the Crimean peninsula. The stony S-type asteroid has a long rotation period of 39.0 hours and measures approximately 41 kilometers (25 miles) in diameter. It was named after the Russian city of Saint Petersburg.

== Orbit and classification ==
Petropolitana is a non-family asteroid of the main belt's background population when applying the hierarchical clustering method to its proper orbital elements. It orbits the Sun in the outer asteroid belt at a distance of 3.0–3.4 AU once every 5 years and 9 months (2,099 days; semi-major axis of 3.21 AU). Its orbit has an eccentricity of 0.06 and an inclination of 4° with respect to the ecliptic. The body's observation arc begins at Heidelberg Observatory on 3 September 1916, or nine nights after its official discovery observation at Simeiz.

== Naming ==
This minor planet was named by its Latin name "Petropolis", after the Russian city of Saint Petersburg. On the same night, Grigory Neujmin also discovered 829 Academia. Both asteroid were named on the occasion of the 200th anniversary of the founding of the Academy of Sciences in Staint Petersburg. The naming was also mentioned in The Names of the Minor Planets by Paul Herget in 1955 (H 82).

== Physical characteristics ==
In the Tholen classification, Petropolitana is a stony S-type asteroid, which are more common in the inner than in the outer asteroid belt.

=== Rotation period ===
In March 2005, a rotational lightcurve of Petropolitana was obtained from photometric observations by French amateur astronomer Pierre Antonini. Lightcurve analysis gave a rotation period of 39.0±0.5 hours with a brightness variation of 0.15±0.01 magnitude (U=2).

In 2016, a modeled lightcurve gave a concurring sidereal period of 37.347±0.005 hours using data from a large collaboration of individual observers (such as above). The study also determined two spin axes of (217.0°, 36.0°) and (34.0°, 41.0°) in ecliptic coordinates (λ, β). In 2018, however, an international photometric survey, using archived photometric data from the Geneva Observatory as well from dedicated observations, modeled a far longer period of 169.52±0.06 hours with an amplitude of 0.42±0.05 magnitude (U=2). The survey uses combines convex lightcurve inversion with a non-convex algorithm (SAGE) to derive their periods.

=== Diameter and albedo ===
According to the surveys carried out by the Infrared Astronomical Satellite IRAS, the NEOWISE mission of NASA's Wide-field Infrared Survey Explorer (WISE), and the Japanese Akari satellite, Petropolitana measures (41.22±1.6), (41.328±0.131) and (48.47±0.92) kilometers in diameter and its surface has an albedo of (0.2382±0.020), (0.216±0.049) and (0.174±0.008), respectively. Alternative mean-diameters published by the WISE team include (43.41±1.15 km) and (51.355±0.403 km) with corresponding albedos of (0.215±0.019) and (0.1542±0.0389). The Collaborative Asteroid Lightcurve Link, adopts the results obtained by IRAS, that is an albedo of 0.2382 and a diameter of 41.22 kilometers based on an absolute magnitude of 9.10.

Two asteroid occultations of Petropolitana from May 2012 and September 2015, gave a best-fit ellipse dimension of (48.0 km × 48.0 km) and (46.0 km × 46.0 km), respectively. These timed observations are taken when the asteroid passes in front of a distant star.
