= 1271 Isergina =

Asteroid

Discovery
- Discovered by: G. Neujmin
- Discovery site: Simeiz Obs.
- Discovery date: 10 October 1931

Designations
- Named after: Pyotr Vasilyevich Isergin (Crimean physician)
- Alternative designations: 1931 TN · 1930 MK; 1932 CK_{1} · 2003 RV_{22} A906 HD
- Minor planet category: main-belt · (outer) background

Orbital characteristics
- Epoch 4 September 2017 (JD 2458000.5)
- Uncertainty parameter 0
- Observation arc: 111.22 yr (40,622 days)
- Aphelion: 3.5228 AU
- Perihelion: 2.7708 AU
- Semi-major axis: 3.1468 AU
- Eccentricity: 0.1195
- Orbital period (sidereal): 5.58 yr (2,039 days)
- Mean anomaly: 160.82°
- Mean motion: 0° 10^{m} 35.76^{s} / day
- Inclination: 6.6687°
- Longitude of ascending node: 127.22°
- Argument of perihelion: 269.37°

Physical characteristics
- Dimensions: 39.58±12.78 km 42.32±14.32 km 44.47 km (derived); 47.52±0.38 km 47.524±0.383 km 50.897±0.464 km 52.15±0.76 km
- Synodic rotation period: 7.59932±0.00009 h 7.829±0.002 h 9.864±0.004 h
- Geometric albedo: 0.031±0.003; 0.038±0.001; 0.0392±0.0102; 0.06±0.06; 0.065±0.009; 0.0677 (derived); 0.08±0.08
- Spectral type: SMASS = C · X/L
- Absolute magnitude (H): 10.20 · 10.30 · 10.39±0.20 · 10.4 · 10.42 · 10.60

1271 Isergina, provisional designation 1931 TN, is a carbonaceous background asteroid from the outer regions of the asteroid belt, approximately 45 kilometers in diameter. It was discovered on 10 October 1931, by Soviet astronomer Grigory Neujmin at the Simeiz Observatory on the Crimean peninsula. The asteroid was named after Crimean physician and friend of the discoverer, Pyotr Isergin.

== Orbit and classification ==
Isergina is a non-family asteroid from the main belt's background population. It orbits the Sun in the outer asteroid belt at a distance of 2.8–3.5 AU once every 5 years and 7 months (2,039 days; semi-major axis of 3.15 AU). Its orbit has an eccentricity of 0.12 and an inclination of 7° with respect to the ecliptic.

The asteroid was first identified as A906 HD at Heidelberg Observatory in April 1906. The body's observation arc begins at Simeiz with its official discovery observation in 1931.

== Physical characteristics ==
In the SMASS classification, Isergina is a carbonaceous C-type asteroid. It has also been characterized as both an X- and L-type by Pan-STARRS photometric survey.

=== Rotation period ===
During 2016–2017, three rotational lightcurves of Isergina were obtained from photometric observations (U=3-/3-/2+). Lightcurve analysis of the adopted result gave a rotation period of 7.59932 hours with a brightness amplitude between 0.25 and 0.36 magnitude (U=3-).

=== Diameter and albedo ===
According to the surveys carried out by the Japanese Akari satellite and the NEOWISE mission of NASA's Wide-field Infrared Survey Explorer, Isergina measures between 39.58 and 52.15 kilometers in diameter and its surface has an albedo between 0.031 and 0.08.

The Collaborative Asteroid Lightcurve Link derives an albedo of 0.0677 and a diameter of 44.47 kilometers based on an absolute magnitude of 10.3.

== Naming ==
This minor planet was named after Crimean physician Pyotr Vasilyevich Isergin (1870–1936), a friend of the discoverer who was treated by him. The author of the Dictionary of Minor Planet Names learned about the naming circumstances from Crimean astronomers I. I. Neyachenko and Galina Kastelʹ (see 3982 Kastelʹ). The official naming citation was mentioned in The Names of the Minor Planets by Paul Herget in 1955 (H 117).
