= 952 Caia =

Main-belt asteroid

Discovery
- Discovered by: G. Neujmin
- Discovery site: Simeiz Obs.
- Discovery date: 27 October 1916

Designations
- Pronunciation: /ˈkeɪə/
- Named after: Caia
- Alternative designations: 1916 Σ_{61} · 1973 WH; A908 EB · A919 GB; A921 RA
- Minor planet category: main-belt · (outer) background

Orbital characteristics
- Epoch 16 February 2017 (JD 2457800.5)
- Uncertainty parameter 0
- Observation arc: 99.63 yr (36,389 days)
- Aphelion: 3.7294 AU
- Perihelion: 2.2611 AU
- Semi-major axis: 2.9952 AU
- Eccentricity: 0.2451
- Orbital period (sidereal): 5.18 yr (1,893 days)
- Mean anomaly: 161.29°
- Mean motion: 0° 11^{m} 24.36^{s} / day
- Inclination: 10.038°
- Longitude of ascending node: 18.567°
- Argument of perihelion: 355.23°

Physical characteristics
- Dimensions: 81.53 km (derived); 81.61±4.6 km (IRAS:12); 85.02±0.91 km 87.97±0.97 km 88.692±0.422; 88.758±1.405 km
- Synodic rotation period: 3.79 h 3.795±0.001 h 7.50±0.01 h 7.51 h
- Geometric albedo: 0.0398±0.0038; 0.047±0.011; 0.048±0.001; 0.0506 (derived); 0.0554±0.007 (IRAS:12)
- Spectral type: P · C
- Absolute magnitude (H): 9.17±0.21 · 9.2 · 9.30

952 Caia /ˈkeɪə/ is a carbonaceous background asteroid from the outer region of the asteroid belt, approximately 82 kilometers (51 miles) in diameter. It was discovered by Soviet–Russian astronomer Grigory Neujmin at the Crimean Simeiz Observatory on 27 October 1916 and given the provisional designation 1916 Σ_{61}. It was named after the heroine in the novel Quo Vadis by Henryk Sienkiewicz.

== Orbit and classification ==
Caia is a non-family asteroid from the main belt's background population. It orbits the Sun in the outer asteroid belt at a distance of 2.3–3.7 AU once every 5 years and 2 months (1,893 days). Its orbit has an eccentricity of 0.25 and an inclination of 10° with respect to the ecliptic. The first unused observation was made at the U.S Taunton Observatory (803) in 1908, when it was identified as 1908 EB, extending the body's observation arc by 8 years prior to its official discovery observation.

The body's odd provisional designation, 1916 Σ_{61}, was assigned at the discovering Simeiz Observatory during the First World War, when communication with the German Astronomisches Rechen-Institut, then in charge of assigning designations, was not possible over long periods of time. Instead, the observatory assigned their own, custom provisional designations containing the Greek letter sigma (Σ), in order to avoid multiple assignments. For simplicity, the letter sigma is often represented by the letter "S".

== Naming ==
This minor planet was named after "Caia", a heroine in the historical novel Quo Vadis written by Polish journalist, novelist and laureate of the Nobel Prize in Literature in 1905, Henryk Sienkiewicz (1846–1916).

== Physical characteristics ==
Caia is a carbonaceous C-type asteroid. It is also classified as a P-type asteroid by NASA's Wide-field Infrared Survey Explorer (WISE).

=== Rotation period ===
Two photoelectric lightcurve observations from 1980 rendered a rotation period of 7.50 and 7.51 hours (U=2/2), while a more recent light-curve analysis in 2004 gave a period of 3.795±0.001 hours (or half the previously determined period) with a very low brightness variation of 0.03 in magnitude (U=2), which typically indicates a nearly spheroidal shape.

=== Diameter and albedo ===
According to the surveys carried out by the Infrared Astronomical Satellite, IRAS, the Japanese Akari satellite, and the WISE telescope with its subsequent NEOWISE mission, the asteroid has a diameter between 81.6 and 88.8 kilometers and a low albedo in the range of 0.040 and 0.056. The Collaborative Asteroid Lightcurve Link agrees with the spaced-based observations and derives an albedo of 0.051 with a corresponding diameter of 81.5 kilometers.
