= 1434 Margot =

Main-belt asteroid

Discovery
- Discovered by: G. Neujmin
- Discovery site: Simeiz Obs.
- Discovery date: 19 March 1936

Designations
- Named after: Gertrud Margot Görsdorf (friend of Wilhelm Gliese)
- Alternative designations: 1936 FD_{1} · 1931 GM; 1931 HA · 1938 RD; 1938 UN · 1988 DU; A906 QA · A922 SD
- Minor planet category: main-belt · (outer); Eos

Orbital characteristics
- Epoch 4 September 2017 (JD 2458000.5)
- Uncertainty parameter 0
- Observation arc: 111.11 yr (40,582 days)
- Aphelion: 3.2158 AU
- Perihelion: 2.8217 AU
- Semi-major axis: 3.0187 AU
- Eccentricity: 0.0653
- Orbital period (sidereal): 5.24 yr (1,916 days)
- Mean anomaly: 86.589°
- Mean motion: 0° 11^{m} 16.44^{s} / day
- Inclination: 10.832°
- Longitude of ascending node: 152.42°
- Argument of perihelion: 147.81°

Physical characteristics
- Dimensions: 27.178±0.303 km 27.20±1.75 km 28.052±0.039 km 29.49 km (derived); 29.65±1.4 km 30.84±0.62 km
- Synodic rotation period: 8.17 h
- Geometric albedo: 0.1106 (derived); 0.117±0.249; 0.1242±0.0101; 0.130±0.023; 0.132±0.006; 0.1353±0.013
- Spectral type: Tholen = S · S B–V = 0.809; U–B = 0.404
- Absolute magnitude (H): 10.43 · 10.49±0.05 · 10.66 · 10.77

1434 Margot, provisional designation 1936 FD_{1}, is a stony Eoan asteroid from the outer regions of the asteroid belt, approximately 29 kilometers in diameter. It was discovered on 19 March 1936, by Soviet astronomer Grigory Neujmin at the Simeiz Observatory on the Crimean peninsula. The asteroid was named after Gertrud Margot Görsdorf, a friend of German astronomer of Wilhelm Gliese.

== Orbit and classification ==
Margot is a member the Eos family (606), the largest asteroid family of the outer asteroid belt consisting of nearly 10,000 asteroids. It orbits the Sun at a distance of 2.8–3.2 AU once every 5 years and 3 months (1,916 days). Its orbit has an eccentricity of 0.07 and an inclination of 11° with respect to the ecliptic.

The body's observation arc begins at Vienna Observatory in August 1906, when it was first identified as A922 SD, almost 30 years prior to its official discovery observation at Simeiz.

== Physical characteristics ==
In the Tholen classification, Margot is a common S-type asteroid. Pan-STARRS photometric survey also characterizes it as a stony S-type, while the overall spectral type for Eoan asteroids is that of a K-type.

=== Rotation period ===
In June 1984, a rotational lightcurve of Margot was obtained from photometric observations by American astronomer Richard Binzel . Lightcurve analysis gave a well-defined rotation period of 8.17 hours with a brightness amplitude of 0.52 magnitude, indicative of a somewhat elongated shape (U=3).

=== Diameter and albedo ===
According to the surveys carried out by the Infrared Astronomical Satellite IRAS, the Japanese Akari satellite and the NEOWISE mission of NASA's Wide-field Infrared Survey Explorer, Margot measures between 27.178 and 30.84 kilometers in diameter and its surface has an albedo between 0.117 and 0.1353.

The Collaborative Asteroid Lightcurve Link derives an albedo of 0.1106 and a diameter of 29.49 kilometers based on an absolute magnitude of 10.66.

== Naming ==
This minor planet was named by German astronomer Wilhelm Gliese after Gertrud Margot Zottmann (1915–1990; née Görsdorf), his friend and schoolfellow for several years at Berlin. Gliese, after whom the asteroid (1823) is named, is best known for the Gliese Catalogue of Nearby Stars, which is itself the source of name for many discovered exoplanets. The discovery circumstances and naming were researched by Lutz Schmadel, the author of the Dictionary of Minor Planet Names.
