= 781 Kartvelia =

Main-belt asteroid

Discovery
- Discovered by: G. N. Neujmin
- Discovery site: Simeis
- Discovery date: 25 January 1914

Designations
- Pronunciation: /kɑːrtˈviːliə/
- Alternative designations: 1914 UF

Orbital characteristics
- Epoch 31 July 2016 (JD 2457600.5)
- Uncertainty parameter 0
- Observation arc: 89.79 yr (32797 d)
- Aphelion: 3.5930 AU (537.51 Gm)
- Perihelion: 2.8462 AU (425.79 Gm)
- Semi-major axis: 3.2196 AU (481.65 Gm)
- Eccentricity: 0.11598
- Orbital period (sidereal): 5.78 yr (2110.1 d)
- Mean anomaly: 62.363°
- Mean motion: 0° 10^{m} 14.196^{s} / day
- Inclination: 19.149°
- Longitude of ascending node: 138.109°
- Argument of perihelion: 156.132°
- Earth MOID: 1.83971 AU (275.217 Gm)
- Jupiter MOID: 1.73687 AU (259.832 Gm)
- T_{Jupiter}: 3.092

Physical characteristics
- Mean radius: 33.01±2.8 km
- Synodic rotation period: 19.04 h (0.793 d)
- Geometric albedo: 0.0704±0.014
- Absolute magnitude (H): 9.5

781 Kartvelia is a minor planet orbiting the Sun that was discovered by Georgian–Russian astronomer Grigory Neujmin on January 25, 1914. Kartvelia comes from the historic name for the inhabitants of the nation of Georgia. This object is orbiting at a distance of 3.22 AU with an eccentricity (ovalness) of 0.12 and a period of 5.78 yr. The orbital plane is inclined at an angle of 19.1° to the plane of the ecliptic.

This asteroid is rotating with a period of 19.0 hours and spans an estimated girth of 66 km. It is tentatively classified as type CPU in the Tholen taxonomic system, with the C indicating a carbonaceous object. This is the namesake of a family of 49–232 asteroids that share similar spectral properties and orbital elements; hence they may have arisen from the same collisional event. All members have a relatively high orbital inclination.
