= 1075 Helina =

Main-belt asteroid

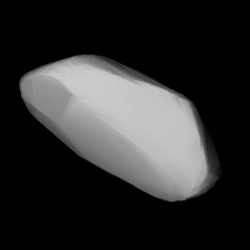
- Modelled shape of Helina from its lightcurve

Discovery
- Discovered by: G. Neujmin
- Discovery site: Simeiz Obs.
- Discovery date: 29 September 1926

Designations
- Named after: Helij Neujmin (discoverer's son)
- Alternative designations: 1926 SC · 1930 KV; 1965 CB · A906 YG; A916 WH
- Minor planet category: main-belt · (outer); Eos

Orbital characteristics
- Epoch 4 September 2017 (JD 2458000.5)
- Uncertainty parameter 0
- Observation arc: 110.85 yr (40,489 days)
- Aphelion: 3.3528 AU
- Perihelion: 2.6705 AU
- Semi-major axis: 3.0116 AU
- Eccentricity: 0.1133
- Orbital period (sidereal): 5.23 yr (1,909 days)
- Mean anomaly: 156.59°
- Mean motion: 0° 11^{m} 18.96^{s} / day
- Inclination: 11.523°
- Longitude of ascending node: 100.81°
- Argument of perihelion: 250.61°

Physical characteristics
- Mean diameter: 26.198±0.414 km 30.39±7.76 km 34.48±0.58 km 35.52 km 37.93±0.85 km
- Synodic rotation period: 44.554±0.1526 h 44.6768±0.0001 h 44.6770±0.0002 h (Note: Hanus (2016d) publication not indexed in ADS. Summary figures for (1075) Helina at LCDB); 44.677±0.001 h 44.9±0.1 h
- Pole ecliptic latitude: (127.0°, −43.0.0°) (λ_{1}/β_{1}); (280.0°, −44.0°) (λ_{2}/β_{2})
- Geometric albedo: 0.11±0.07; 0.111±0.005; 0.1220; 0.129±0.009
- Spectral type: Tholen = SU; B–V = 0.765; U–B = 0.370
- Absolute magnitude (H): 10.10±0.43 · 10.15 · 10.31 · 10.371±0.003 (R)

1075 Helina, provisional designation 1926 SC, is a stony Eos asteroid from the outer regions of the asteroid belt, approximately 34 kilometers (21 miles) in diameter. It was discovered on 29 September 1926, by astronomer Grigory Neujmin at the Simeiz Observatory on the Crimean peninsula. The asteroid was named after the discoverer's son, Helij Neujmin.

== Orbit and classification ==
Helina is a member the Eos family (606), the largest asteroid family of the outer main belt consisting of nearly 10,000 asteroids. It orbits the Sun in the outer asteroid belt at a distance of 2.7–3.4 AU once every 5 years and 3 months (1,909 days; semi-major axis of 3.01 AU). Its orbit has an eccentricity of 0.11 and an inclination of 12° with respect to the ecliptic.

The asteroid was first identified as A906 YG at Heidelberg Observatory in December 1906. The body's observation arc begins at Simeiz Observatory in October 1926, nine days after its official discovery observation.

== Naming ==
This minor planet was named after Helij Grigorevich Neujmin (1910–1982), a son of discoverer Grigory Neujmin. The author of the Dictionary of Minor Planet Names, Lutz Schmadel learned about the naming circumstances from Crimean astronomers I. I. Neyachenko and N. S. Chernykh (see 2325 Chernykh).

== Physical characteristics ==
In the Tholen classification, Helina is a stony S-type asteroid with an unusual spectra (SU).

=== Rotation period ===
In March 2013, a rotational lightcurve of Helina was obtained from photometric observations in the R-band by astronomers at the Palomar Transient Factory in California. Lightcurve analysis gave a rotation period of 44.554 hours with a brightness variation of 0.91 magnitude (U=2). In April 2013, European amateur astronomers Matthieu Bachschmidt, Paul Krafft, Olivier Gerteis, Hubert Gully and Luc Arnold measured a period of 44.9 hours with an amplitude of 0.64 magnitude (U=3-).

While not being a slow rotator, Helina has a longer-than average period. Its high brightness amplitude is also indicative for an elongated or irregular shape, rather than a spherical one.

=== Poles ===
The asteroid's lightcurve has also been modeled several times. It gave a concurring period of 44.6768 and 44.677 hours, respectively. Modelling in the 2018-study also gave two spin axis of (127.0°, −43.0.0°) and (280.0°, −44.0°) in ecliptic coordinates (λ, β).

=== Diameter and albedo ===
According to the surveys carried out by the Infrared Astronomical Satellite IRAS, the Japanese Akari satellite and the NEOWISE mission of NASA's Wide-field Infrared Survey Explorer, Helina measures between 26.198 and 37.93 kilometers in diameter and its surface has an albedo between 0.11 and 0.129. The Collaborative Asteroid Lightcurve Link adopts the results obtained by IRAS, that is an albedo of 0.1220 and a diameter of 35.52 kilometers based on an absolute magnitude of 10.15.
