= 1110 Jaroslawa =

Bright background asteroid and rather slow rotator

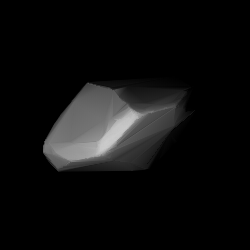
- Shape model of Jaroslawa from its lightcurve

Discovery
- Discovered by: G. Neujmin
- Discovery site: Simeiz Obs.
- Discovery date: 10 August 1928

Designations
- Named after: Jaroslav Grigorevich Neujmin (discoverer's son)
- Alternative designations: 1928 PD · 1934 FN; A917 FA
- Minor planet category: main-belt · (inner) background

Orbital characteristics
- Epoch 23 March 2018 (JD 2458200.5)
- Uncertainty parameter 0
- Observation arc: 89.31 yr (32,620 d)
- Aphelion: 2.7532 AU
- Perihelion: 1.6839 AU
- Semi-major axis: 2.2186 AU
- Eccentricity: 0.2410
- Orbital period (sidereal): 3.30 yr (1,207 d)
- Mean anomaly: 45.750°
- Mean motion: 0° 17^{m} 53.88^{s} / day
- Inclination: 5.8558°
- Longitude of ascending node: 241.75°
- Argument of perihelion: 78.600°

Physical characteristics
- Mean diameter: 12.15±2.05 km 12.30±2.32 km 12.306±0.101 km 13.397±0.096 km 14.90±0.52 km 15.60 km (calculated)
- Synodic rotation period: 94.432±0.002 h 97.278±0.005 h 97.4±0.3 h
- Geometric albedo: 0.153±0.012; 0.1895±0.0164; 0.20 (assumed); 0.237±0.034; 0.29±0.19; 0.33±0.15
- Spectral type: SMASS = S · L
- Absolute magnitude (H): 11.40 · 11.63; 11.65±0.22; 11.80

1110 Jaroslawa (prov. designation: 1928 PD) is a bright background asteroid and rather slow rotator from the inner regions of the asteroid belt. The stony S-type asteroid has a rotation period of 97.4 hours and measures approximately 13 kilometers (8 miles) in diameter. It was discovered at the Simeiz Observatory on the Crimean peninsula on 10 August 1928, by astronomer Soviet Grigory Neujmin, who named it after his son, Jaroslav Grigorevich Neujmin (born 1928).

== Orbit and classification ==
Jaroslawa is a non-family asteroid from the main belt's background population. It orbits the Sun in the inner main-belt at a distance of 1.7–2.8 AU once every 3 years and 4 months (1,207 days; semi-major axis of 2.22 AU). Its orbit has an eccentricity of 0.24 and an inclination of 6° with respect to the ecliptic.

The asteroid was first observed as A917 FA at Heidelberg Observatory in March 1917. The body's observation arc begins with its official discovery observation at Simeiz in August 1928.

== Naming ==
This minor planet was named after Jaroslav Grigorevich Neujmin (born 1928), son of the discoverer Grigory Neujmin. The author of the Dictionary of Minor Planet Names leaned about the naming from Ilya Isaakovich Neyachenko and Nikolai Chernykh after whom the asteroids 3845 Neyachenko and 2325 Chernykh were named.

== Physical characteristics ==
In the SMASS classification, Jaroslawa is a common, stony S-type asteroid, while it has been characterized as an uncommon L-type asteroid by PanSTARRS' photometric survey.

=== Rotation period ===
In January 2012, a rotational lightcurve of Jaroslawa was obtained from photometric observations by American astronomer Maurice Clark at Preston Gott Observatory in Lubbock, Texas. Lightcurve analysis gave a long rotation period of 94.432 hours and a high brightness variation of 0.80 magnitude (U=2+). In October 2014, Frederick Pilcher at the Organ Mesa Observatory (G50) in New Mexico, in collaboration with astronomers at Etscorn (719) and Bigmuskie (B88) observatories, obtained a refined period of 97.4 hours with an amplitude of 0.65±0.05 magnitude (U=3-). This result supersedes other measurements by Maurice Clark, Nicolas Esseiva, Raoul Behrend, Laurent Bernasconi, Jean-Gabriel Bosch and Josep Coloma. While not being a core slow rotator, with periods above 100 hours, Jaroslawa has a significantly longer period than most minor planets, which typically rotate between 2 and 20 hours once around their axes.

=== Spin axis and shape ===
In 2016, a modeled lightcurve using photometric data from various sources was published. It gave a concurring period of 97.278 hours, as well as a spin axis of (236.0°, 75.0°) in ecliptic coordinates (λ, β). All lightcurve observations show a high brightness variation, indicative for an elongated, non-spheroidal shape.

=== Diameter and albedo ===
According to the surveys carried out by the Japanese Akari satellite and the NEOWISE mission of NASA's Wide-field Infrared Survey Explorer, Jaroslawa measures between 12.15 and 14.90 kilometers in diameter and its surface has an albedo between 0.153 and 0.33.

The Collaborative Asteroid Lightcurve Link assumes a standard albedo for a stony asteroid of 0.20 and calculates a diameter of 15.60 kilometers based on an absolute magnitude of 11.4.
