= 1189 Terentia =

Asteroid

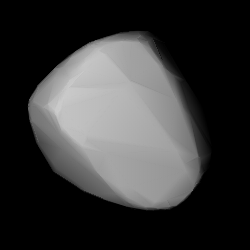
- Modelled shape of Terentia from its lightcurve

Discovery
- Discovered by: G. Neujmin
- Discovery site: Simeiz Obs.
- Discovery date: 17 September 1930

Designations
- Named after: Lidiya Terent'eva (orbit computer)
- Alternative designations: 1930 SG · 1935 SK_{2} A915 TJ
- Minor planet category: main-belt · (outer); Terentia

Orbital characteristics
- Epoch 4 September 2017 (JD 2458000.5)
- Uncertainty parameter 0
- Observation arc: 101.46 yr (37,057 days)
- Aphelion: 3.2681 AU
- Perihelion: 2.5914 AU
- Semi-major axis: 2.9298 AU
- Eccentricity: 0.1155
- Orbital period (sidereal): 5.01 yr (1,832 days)
- Mean anomaly: 103.65°
- Mean motion: 0° 11^{m} 47.4^{s} / day
- Inclination: 9.8671°
- Longitude of ascending node: 275.24°
- Argument of perihelion: 95.571°

Physical characteristics
- Dimensions: 55.40±14.41 km 55.88±3.2 km 55.94 km (derived); 57.23±17.09 km 59.246±0.201 km 61.140±1.045 km 62.81±0.85 km 70.90±0.51 km
- Synodic rotation period: 19.30±0.01 h 19.308±0.002 h
- Geometric albedo: 0.042±0.006; 0.045±0.001; 0.0473±0.0053; 0.05±0.04; 0.0566±0.007; 0.0619 (derived)
- Spectral type: SMASS = Ch · C
- Absolute magnitude (H): 9.80 · 9.84±0.26 · 9.9 · 9.96 · 10.00

1189 Terentia, provisional designation 1930 SG, is a carbonaceous Terentian asteroid from the outer regions of the asteroid belt, approximately 56 kilometers in diameter and the namesake of its family. The asteroid was discovered by Russian astronomer Grigory Neujmin at Simeiz Observatory on 17 September 1930.

== Classification ==
Terentia is the namesake of the Terentia family (618), a small asteroid family of less than a hundred known members of a carbonaceous C-type composition orbiting in the outer main-belt.

== Orbit ==
Terentia orbits the Sun at a distance of 2.6–3.3 AU once every 5.01 years (1,832 days). Its orbit has an eccentricity of 0.12 and an inclination of 10° with respect to the ecliptic. The body's observation arc begins at Simeiz, 5 days after its official discovery observation.

== Physical characteristics ==
In the SMASS taxonomy, is classified as a Ch-type, a hydrated subtype of the carbonaceous C-type asteroids.

== Naming ==
This minor planet was named after Lidiya Terent'eva (1879–1933), female collaborator at the Simeis Observatory.
