= 824 Anastasia =

Main-belt asteroid

Discovery
- Discovered by: G. N. Neujmin
- Discovery site: Simeis
- Discovery date: 25 March 1916

Designations
- Pronunciation: /ˌænəˈsteɪʒə/
- Alternative designations: 1916 ZH

Orbital characteristics
- Epoch 31 July 2016 (JD 2457600.5)
- Uncertainty parameter 0
- Observation arc: 102.13 yr (37302 d)
- Aphelion: 3.1761 AU (475.14 Gm)
- Perihelion: 2.4106 AU (360.62 Gm)
- Semi-major axis: 2.7934 AU (417.89 Gm)
- Eccentricity: 0.13702
- Orbital period (sidereal): 4.67 yr (1705.3 d)
- Mean anomaly: 85.1285°
- Mean motion: 0° 12^{m} 39.996^{s} / day
- Inclination: 8.1258°
- Longitude of ascending node: 141.401°
- Argument of perihelion: 142.050°
- Earth MOID: 1.40012 AU (209.455 Gm)
- Jupiter MOID: 2.0096 AU (300.63 Gm)
- T_{Jupiter}: 3.300

Physical characteristics
- Mean radius: 17.07±2.55 km
- Synodic rotation period: 250 h (10 d)
- Geometric albedo: 0.1039±0.040
- Absolute magnitude (H): 10.41

824 Anastasia is a main belt asteroid orbiting the Sun. It is approximately 34.14 km in diameter. It was discovered on March 25, 1916, by Grigory Neujmin at Simeiz Observatory in Russian Empire. It is named in memory of Anastasia Semenoff, an acquaintance of the discoverer.

== Occultation ==
On April 6, 2010, 824 Anastasia had the distinction of causing the brightest asteroid occultation ever predicted for North America for an asteroid of its size. The asteroid occulted the naked-eye star ζ Ophiuchi over a path stretching from the Los Angeles area to Edmonton, Alberta.
