= 1347 Patria =

Carbonaceous asteroid

Discovery
- Discovered by: G. Neujmin
- Discovery site: Simeiz Obs.
- Discovery date: 6 November 1931

Designations
- Pronunciation: /ˈpætriə, ˈpeɪtriə/
- Named after: Latin for fatherland
- Alternative designations: 1931 VW · 1968 UK_{1} 1970 EY_{2} · A898 VB
- Minor planet category: main-belt · (middle) background

Orbital characteristics
- Epoch 4 September 2017 (JD 2458000.5)
- Uncertainty parameter 0
- Observation arc: 118.97 yr (43,455 days)
- Aphelion: 2.7476 AU
- Perihelion: 2.3946 AU
- Semi-major axis: 2.5711 AU
- Eccentricity: 0.0687
- Orbital period (sidereal): 4.12 yr (1,506 days)
- Mean anomaly: 272.77°
- Mean motion: 0° 14^{m} 20.76^{s} / day
- Inclination: 11.869°
- Longitude of ascending node: 229.21°
- Argument of perihelion: 201.70°

Physical characteristics
- Dimensions: 30.72±7.10 km 31.813±8.920 km 32.33±0.15 km 32.40±1.1 km 32.48 km (derived); 33.48±0.49 km 34.98±10.26 km
- Synodic rotation period: 29.5±0.3 h
- Geometric albedo: 0.03±0.00; 0.035±0.022; 0.036±0.001; 0.0386±0.003; 0.04±0.01; 0.0462±0.0296; 0.0506 (derived)
- Spectral type: C (assumed)
- Absolute magnitude (H): 11.20 · 11.23 · 11.23±0.30 · 11.3 · 11.48 · 11.54 · 11.60

1347 Patria, provisional designation 1931 VW, is a carbonaceous asteroid from the background population of the central asteroid belt, approximately 32 kilometers in diameter. It was discovered on 6 November 1931, by Soviet astronomer Grigory Neujmin at the Simeiz Observatory on the Crimean peninsula. The asteroid was named for the Latin word of fatherland.

== Orbit and classification ==
Patria is a non-family asteroid of the main belt's background population. It orbits the Sun in the central main-belt at a distance of 2.4–2.7 AU once every 4 years and 1 month (1,506 days; semi-major axis of 2.57 AU). Its orbit has an eccentricity of 0.07 and an inclination of 12° with respect to the ecliptic.

The asteroid was first identified as A898 VB at Heidelberg Observatory in November 1898. The body's observation arc begins a few days later at Vienna Observatory, almost 33 years prior to its official discovery observation at Simeiz.

== Physical characteristics ==
Patria is an assumed C-type asteroid.

=== Rotation period ===
In October 2005, a first rotational lightcurve of Patria was obtained from photometric observations by French amateur astronomer Laurent Bernasconi. Lightcurve analysis gave a slightly longer-than average rotation period of 29.5 hours with a brightness amplitude of 0.12 magnitude (U=2).

=== Diameter and albedo ===
According to the surveys carried out by the Infrared Astronomical Satellite IRAS, the Japanese Akari satellite and the NEOWISE mission of NASA's Wide-field Infrared Survey Explorer, Patria measures between 30.72 and 34.98 kilometers in diameter and its surface has an albedo between 0.03 and 0.0462.

The Collaborative Asteroid Lightcurve Link derives an albedo of 0.0506 and a diameter of 32.48 kilometers based on an absolute magnitude of 11.3.

== Naming ==
This minor planet was named after "Patria", the Latin word for native country or fatherland. The official naming citation was mentioned in The Names of the Minor Planets by Paul Herget in 1955 (H 122).
