= Grigory Neujmin =

Georgian–Russian astronomer

Minor planets discovered: 74
see § List of discovered minor planets

Grigory Nikolayevich Neujmin (Russian: Григорий Николаевич Неуймин; 3 January 1886 [O.S. 22 December 1885] – 17 December 1946) was a Georgian–Russian astronomer, native of Tbilisi in Georgia, and a discoverer of numerous minor planets as well as 6 periodic and a hyperbolic comet at the Pulkovo and Simeiz Observatories during the first half of the 20th century.

== Discoveries ==
The Minor Planet Center credits his discoveries under the name "G. N. Neujmin", and his surname appears this way in the literature. However, the modern English transliteration of his name would be Neuymin.

Neujmin is credited with the discovery of 74 asteroids, and notably 951 Gaspra and 762 Pulcova.

He also discovered and co-discovered 6 Jupiter-family comets, namely 25D/Neujmin, 28P/Neujmin, 42P/Neujmin, 57P/du Toit-Neujmin-Delporte (including fragment A) and 58P/Jackson–Neujmin, as well as C/1914 M1 (Neujmin), a hyperbolic comet.

== Awards and honors ==
He received the Order of the Red Banner of Labour on 10 June 1945. The lunar crater Neujmin is named in his honour, as is 1129 Neujmina, a main-belt asteroid of the Eos family discovered by Praskovjya Parkhomenko at Simeiz Observatory in 1929.

== List of discovered minor planets ==
748 Simeïsa	14 March 1913	list
751 Faïna	28 April 1913	list
752 Sulamitis	30 April 1913	list
753 Tiflis	30 April 1913	list
762 Pulcova	3 September 1913	list
768 Struveana	4 October 1913	list
769 Tatjana	6 October 1913	list
779 Nina	25 January 1914	list
780 Armenia	25 January 1914	list
781 Kartvelia	25 January 1914	list

787 Moskva	20 April 1914	list
789 Lena	24 June 1914	list
791 Ani	29 June 1914	list
814 Tauris	2 January 1916	list
824 Anastasia	25 March 1916	list
825 Tanina	27 March 1916	list
829 Academia	25 August 1916	list
830 Petropolitana	25 August 1916	list
847 Agnia	2 September 1915	list
848 Inna	5 September 1915	list

877 Walküre	13 September 1915	list
882 Swetlana	15 August 1917	list
916 America	7 August 1915	list
917 Lyka	5 September 1915	list
951 Gaspra	30 July 1916	list
952 Caia	27 October 1916	list
1075 Helina	29 September 1926	list
1099 Figneria	13 September 1928	list
1110 Jaroslawa	10 August 1928	list
1123 Shapleya	21 September 1928	list

1135 Colchis	3 October 1929	list
1137 Raïssa	27 October 1929	list
1140 Crimea	30 December 1929	list
1146 Biarmia	7 May 1929	list
1147 Stavropolis	11 June 1929	list
1158 Luda	31 August 1929	list
1189 Terentia	17 September 1930	list
1190 Pelagia	20 September 1930	list
1202 Marina	13 September 1931	list
1210 Morosovia	6 June 1931	list

1236 Thaïs	6 November 1931	list
1255 Schilowa	8 July 1932	list
1269 Rollandia	20 September 1930	list
1271 Isergina	10 October 1931	list
1277 Dolores	18 April 1933	list
1289 Kutaïssi	19 August 1933	list
1306 Scythia	22 July 1930	list
1307 Cimmeria	17 October 1930	list
1309 Hyperborea	11 October 1931	list
1316 Kasan	17 November 1933	list

1331 Solvejg	25 August 1933	list
1347 Patria	6 November 1931	list
1351 Uzbekistania	5 October 1934	list
1379 Lomonosowa	19 March 1936	list
1386 Storeria	28 July 1935	list
1403 Idelsonia	13 August 1936	list
1434 Margot	19 March 1936	list
1459 Magnya	4 November 1937	list
1484 Postrema	29 April 1938	list
1590 Tsiolkovskaja	1 July 1933	list

1603 Neva	4 November 1926	list
1653 Yakhontovia	30 August 1937	list
1671 Chaika	3 October 1934	list
1692 Subbotina	16 August 1936	list
1725 CrAO	20 September 1930	list
1734 Zhongolovich	11 October 1928	list
1783 Albitskij	24 March 1935	list
2166 Handahl	13 August 1936	list
2237 Melnikov	2 October 1938	list
2484 Parenago	7 October 1928	list

2536 Kozyrev	15 August 1939	list
3036 Krat	11 October 1937	list
3761 Romanskaya	25 July 1936	list
4420 Alandreev	15 August 1936	list
