= 1236 Thaïs =

Asteroid

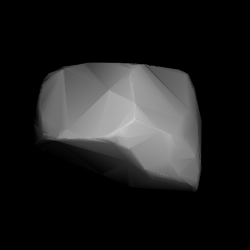
- Modelled shape of Thaïs from its lightcurve

Discovery
- Discovered by: G. Neujmin
- Discovery site: Simeiz Obs.
- Discovery date: 6 November 1931

Designations
- Pronunciation: /ˈθeɪ.ɪs/
- Named after: Thaïs (ancient Greek hetaira)
- Alternative designations: 1931 VX · 1957 LQ; 1964 JH · 1965 WA
- Minor planet category: main-belt · (inner); background

Orbital characteristics
- Epoch 16 February 2017 (JD 2457800.5)
- Uncertainty parameter 0
- Observation arc: 84.57 yr (30,888 days)
- Aphelion: 3.0192 AU
- Perihelion: 1.8455 AU
- Semi-major axis: 2.4323 AU
- Eccentricity: 0.2413
- Orbital period (sidereal): 3.79 yr (1,386 days)
- Mean anomaly: 216.42°
- Mean motion: 0° 15^{m} 35.28^{s} / day
- Inclination: 13.169°
- Longitude of ascending node: 48.618°
- Argument of perihelion: 305.94°

Physical characteristics
- Mean diameter: 14.43±4.75 km 17.18±4.94 km 19.163±1.790 km 20.07±0.41 km 22.34±1.3 km (IRAS:7)
- Synodic rotation period: 72 h
- Geometric albedo: 0.0599±0.007 (IRAS:7); 0.075±0.004; 0.0813±0.0159; 0.10±0.07; 0.11±0.11
- Spectral type: Tholen = T B–V = 0.785; U–B = 0.383
- Absolute magnitude (H): 11.91; 11.93

1236 Thaïs /ˈθeɪ.ɪs/ (prov. designation: 1931 VX) is a dark background asteroid from the inner regions of the asteroid belt. The rare T-type asteroid has a notably long rotation period of 72 hours and measures approximately 18 kilometers (11 miles). It was discovered on 6 November 1931, by Soviet astronomer Grigory Neujmin at Simeiz Observatory on the Crimean peninsula, and named after the ancient Greek prostitute Thaïs.

== Orbit and classification ==
Thaïs is a non-family asteroid of the main belt's background population when applying the hierarchical clustering method to its proper orbital elements. It orbits the Sun in the inner main-belt at a distance of 1.8–3.0 AU once every 3 years and 9 months (1,386 days). Its orbit has an eccentricity of 0.24 and an inclination of 13° with respect to the ecliptic. The body's observation arc begins at the discovering observatory, one month after its official discovery observation, as no precoveries were taken, and no prior identifications were made.

== Naming ==
This minor planet was named after Thaïs, the famous Greek hetaera (ancient prostitute), who lived during the time of Alexander the Great (356–323 BC) and accompanied him on his campaigns. It is also the name of the protagonist in the novel Thaïs by French poet Anatole France.

== Physical characteristics ==
=== Spectral type ===
Thaïs is a dark and reddish T-type asteroid in the Tholen taxonomic scheme. It has also been classified as a L-type asteroid by PanSTARRS large-scale survey.

=== Rotation period ===
As of 2017, the only existing lightcurve of Thaïs gives a rotation period of 72 hours with a brightness variation of 0.08 magnitude (U=1). The fragmentary light curve was obtained by Austrian astronomers from photoelectric observations in the early 1980s. While not being a slow rotator, it has a significantly longer-than average rotation period, if future observations confirm the tentative results.

=== Diameter and albedo ===
According to the surveys carried out by the Infrared Astronomical Satellite IRAS, the Japanese Akari satellite, and NASA's Wide-field Infrared Survey Explorer with its subsequent NEOWISE mission, Thaïs measures between 14.43 and 22.34 kilometers in diameter, and its surface has an albedo between 0.06 and 0.11. The Collaborative Asteroid Lightcurve Link adopts the results obtained by IRAS, that is, an albedo of 0.0599 and a diameter of 22.34 kilometers based on an absolute magnitude of 11.93.
