= 1306 Scythia =

Dark Ursula asteroid from the outer regions of the asteroid belt

Discovery
- Discovered by: G. Neujmin
- Discovery site: Simeiz Obs.
- Discovery date: 22 July 1930

Designations
- Pronunciation: /ˈsɪθiə, ˈsɪðiə/
- Named after: Scythia (Historic region)
- Alternative designations: 1930 OB · 1933 DN; 1935 OA · 1951 JB; 1956 EM_{1} · 1957 KQ
- Minor planet category: main-belt · (outer); Ursula

Orbital characteristics
- Epoch 4 September 2017 (JD 2458000.5)
- Uncertainty parameter 0
- Observation arc: 86.94 yr (31,756 days)
- Aphelion: 3.4451 AU
- Perihelion: 2.8533 AU
- Semi-major axis: 3.1492 AU
- Eccentricity: 0.0940
- Orbital period (sidereal): 5.59 yr (2,041 days)
- Mean anomaly: 142.14°
- Mean motion: 0° 10^{m} 35.04^{s} / day
- Inclination: 14.935°
- Longitude of ascending node: 274.24°
- Argument of perihelion: 139.44°

Physical characteristics
- Dimensions: 66.780±0.710 km 67.14±4.4 km 72.95±20.42 km 73.53±20.87 km 77.708±1.662 km 83.65±1.41 km
- Synodic rotation period: 7.525±0.001 h 15.05±0.01 h
- Geometric albedo: 0.034±0.001; 0.035±0.003; 0.0382±0.0057; 0.05±0.03; 0.05±0.04; 0.0512±0.007; 0.052±0.006
- Spectral type: Tholen = S B–V = 0.853; U–B = 0.398
- Absolute magnitude (H): 9.51±0.24 · 9.64 · 9.71

1306 Scythia, provisional designation 1930 OB, is a dark Ursula asteroid from the outer regions of the asteroid belt, approximately 72 kilometers in diameter. It was discovered on 22 July 1930, by Soviet astronomer Grigory Neujmin at the Simeiz Observatory on the Crimean peninsula. The asteroid was named for the historic region of Scythia.

== Orbit and classification ==
Scythia is a member of the Ursula family (631), a mid-sized asteroid family in the outer main-belt. It orbits the Sun at a distance of 2.9–3.4 AU once every 5 years and 7 months (2,041 days; semi-major axis of 3.15 AU). Its orbit has an eccentricity of 0.09 and an inclination of 15° with respect to the ecliptic. The body's observation arc begins with its official discovery observation at Simeiz in July 1930.

== Physical characteristics ==
In the Tholen classification, Scythia is a stony S-type asteroid, unlike the overall spectral type of the Ursula family which is that of a C- and X-type.

=== Rotation period ===
In September 2003, a rotational lightcurve of Scythia was obtained from photometric observations by Robert Stephens at the Santana Observatory in California. Lightcurve analysis gave a rotation period of 15.05 hours with a brightness variation of 0.15 magnitude (U=2). In August 2008, Pierre Antonini measured a better period solution of 7.525 hours (or half the period) and an amplitude of 0.25 magnitude (U=3).

=== Diameter and albedo ===
According to the surveys carried out by the Infrared Astronomical Satellite IRAS, the Japanese Akari satellite and the NEOWISE mission of NASA's Wide-field Infrared Survey Explorer, Scythia measures between 66.780 and 83.65 kilometers in diameter and its surface has a low albedo between 0.034 and 0.052.

The Collaborative Asteroid Lightcurve Link adopts the results obtained by IRAS, that is, an albedo of 0.0512 and a diameter of 67.14 kilometers based on an absolute magnitude of 9.71.

== Naming ==
This minor planet was named after the ancient region of Scythia, located east of the Black Sea. The official naming citation was mentioned in The Names of the Minor Planets by Paul Herget in 1955 (H 119).
