= 1289 Kutaïssi =

Stony Koronian asteroid

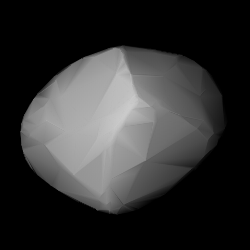
- Modelled shape of Kutaïssi from its lightcurve

Discovery
- Discovered by: G. Neujmin
- Discovery site: Simeiz Obs.
- Discovery date: 19 August 1933

Designations
- Named after: Kutaisi (city in Georgia)
- Alternative designations: 1933 QR · 1928 QD; 1948 TJ_{2} · 1953 TO_{2} A893 GA · A919 UC
- Minor planet category: main-belt · Koronis

Orbital characteristics
- Epoch 16 February 2017 (JD 2457800.5)
- Uncertainty parameter 0
- Observation arc: 88.24 yr (32,228 days)
- Aphelion: 3.0411 AU
- Perihelion: 2.6783 AU
- Semi-major axis: 2.8597 AU
- Eccentricity: 0.0634
- Orbital period (sidereal): 4.84 yr (1,766 days)
- Mean anomaly: 113.61°
- Mean motion: 0° 12^{m} 13.68^{s} / day
- Inclination: 1.6165°
- Longitude of ascending node: 193.19°
- Argument of perihelion: 117.39°

Physical characteristics
- Mean diameter: 19.20±0.45 km 21.531±0.269 km 22.610±0.158 km 22.97±0.56 km 25.53 km (derived); 25.62±1.8 km (IRAS:4)
- Synodic rotation period: 3.60 h
- Geometric albedo: 0.1216 (derived); 0.1374±0.021 (IRAS:4); 0.1567±0.0371; 0.172±0.009; 0.245±0.023
- Spectral type: Tholen = S; B–V = 0.800; U–B = 0.380
- Absolute magnitude (H): 10.70±0.03 (R) · 10.73 · 10.87

1289 Kutaïssi (prov. designation: 1933 QR) is a stony Koronian asteroid from the outer region of the asteroid belt. Discovered by Grigory Neujmin at Simeiz Observatory in 1933, it was later named after the Georgian city of Kutaisi. The S-type asteroid has a rotation period of 3.6 hours and measures approximately 22 kilometers (14 miles) in diameter.

== Discovery ==
Kutaïssi was discovered on 19 August 1933, by Soviet astronomer Grigory Neujmin at Simeiz Observatory on the Crimean peninsula. It was independently discovered a few days later by Eugène Delporte at the Belgian Uccle Observatory on 25 August, as well as by Cyril Jackson at the South African Johannesburg Observatory on 11 September 1933. It was first observed as A893 GA at Heidelberg in 1893. The body's observation arc begins with its observation as 1928 QD at Simeiz in 1928, or 5 years prior to its official discovery observation.

== Orbit and classification ==
Kutaïssi is a stony member of the Koronis family, a group consisting of about 200 known bodies, thought to have been formed at least two billion years ago in a catastrophic collision between two larger bodies. It orbits the Sun in the outer main-belt at a distance of 2.7–3.0 AU once every 4 years and 10 months (1,766 days). Its orbit has an eccentricity of 0.06 and an inclination of 2° with respect to the ecliptic.

== Naming ==
This minor planet was named after the city of Kutaisi, now the legislative capital of Georgia, and its second largest city, after the capital Tbilisi. The official naming citation was first mentioned in The Names of the Minor Planets by Paul Herget in 1955 (H 118).

== Physical characteristics ==
Kutaïssi is a common stony S-type asteroid in the Tholen classification.

=== Rotation period ===
The first rotational light curve of Kutaïssi was obtained from photometric observations by American astronomer Richard Binzel in February 1984. It gave a rotation period of 3.60 hours with a brightness variation of 0.40 magnitude (U=3). In 1987 and 2004, a group of American astronomers obtained concurring light curves with a period of 3.624±0.001 and 3.624±0.006 hours and an amplitude of 0.30 and 0.42 magnitude, respectively (U=2/3).

=== Diameter and albedo ===
According to the surveys carried out by the Infrared Astronomical Satellite IRAS, the Japanese Akari satellite, and NASA's Wide-field Infrared Survey Explorer with its subsequent NEOWISE mission, Kutaïssi measures between 19.20 and 25.62 kilometers in diameter, and its surface has an albedo between 0.1374 and 0.245. The Collaborative Asteroid Lightcurve Link derives an albedo of 0.1216 and a diameter of 25.53 kilometers based on an absolute magnitude of 10.87.
