= 1140 Crimea =

Stony asteroid

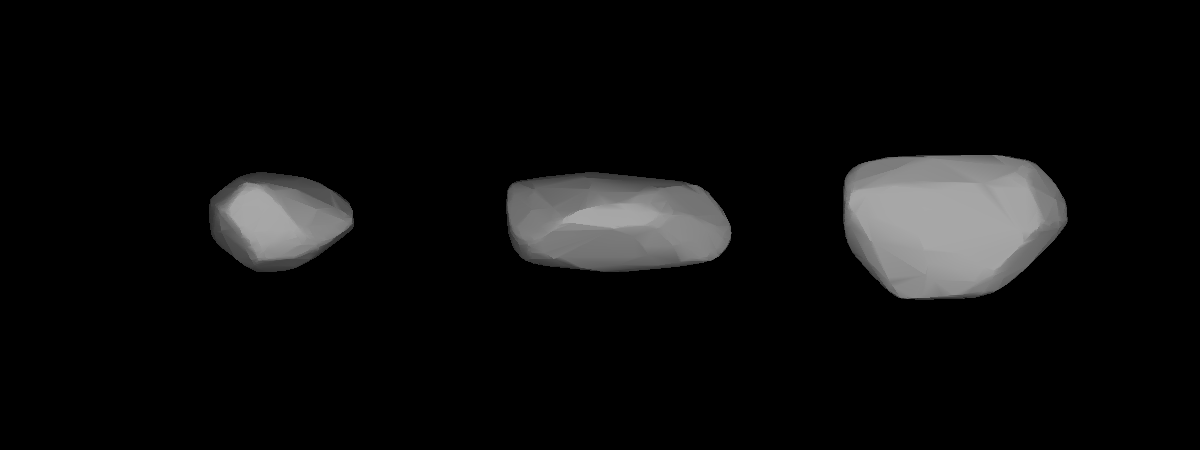
- Lightcurve-based 3D-model of Crimea

Discovery
- Discovered by: G. Neujmin
- Discovery site: Simeiz Obs.
- Discovery date: 30 December 1929

Designations
- Named after: Crimea (Black Sea peninsula)
- Alternative designations: 1929 YC · A922 HA
- Minor planet category: main-belt · (middle)

Orbital characteristics
- Epoch 4 September 2017 (JD 2458000.5)
- Uncertainty parameter 0
- Observation arc: 82.04 yr (29,966 days)
- Aphelion: 3.0846 AU
- Perihelion: 2.4579 AU
- Semi-major axis: 2.7712 AU
- Eccentricity: 0.1131
- Orbital period (sidereal): 4.61 yr (1,685 days)
- Mean anomaly: 64.258°
- Mean motion: 0° 12^{m} 48.96^{s} / day
- Inclination: 14.136°
- Longitude of ascending node: 72.139°
- Argument of perihelion: 310.16°

Physical characteristics
- Dimensions: 27.75±1.1 km (IRAS:13); 28.87±0.36 km 29.179±0.155 km 29.554±0.205 km
- Synodic rotation period: 9.77±0.01 h 9.784±0.001 h 9.7869±0.0005 h
- Geometric albedo: 0.160±0.023; 0.1615±0.0193; 0.167±0.005; 0.1772±0.014 (IRAS:13)
- Spectral type: S (Tholen) · S (SMASS); S · B–V = 0.916
- Absolute magnitude (H): 9.58±0.55 · 10.28

1140 Crimea, provisional designation 1929 YC, is a stony asteroid from the middle region of the asteroid belt, approximately 28 kilometers in diameter. It was discovered on 30 December 1929, by Soviet astronomer Grigory Neujmin at Simeiz Observatory on the Crimean peninsula, after which it was named.

== Orbit and classification ==
Crimea is a S-type asteroid in both the Tholen and SMASS taxonomic schemes. It orbits the Sun in the central main belt at a distance of 2.5–3.1 AU once every 4 years and 7 months (1,685 days). Its orbit has an eccentricity of 0.11 and an inclination of 14° with respect to the ecliptic. First identified as A922 HA at Simeiz in 1922, the body's observation arc begins at Uccle in 1935, or 16 years after its official discovery observation at Simeiz.

== Lightcurves ==
In April 2005, a rotational lightcurve of Crimea was obtained by American astronomer Robert Stephens at Santana Observatory in California. Lightcurve analysis gave a well-defined rotation period of 9.77 hours with a brightness variation of 0.30 magnitude (U=3). Photometric observations by amateur astronomers Federico Manzini and Pierre Antonini in March 2014, gave a concurring period of 9.784 hours with an amplitude of 0.23 magnitude (U=2). In addition, a modeled lightcurve using data from the Uppsala Asteroid Photometric Catalogue and other sources gave a period 9.7869 hours, as well as a spin axis of (12.0°, -73.0°) in ecliptic coordinates (U=n.a.).

== Diameter and albedo ==
According to the surveys carried out by the Infrared Astronomical Satellite IRAS, the Japanese Akari satellite, and NASA's Wide-field Infrared Survey Explorer with its subsequent NEOWISE mission, Crimea measures between 27.75 and 29.18 kilometers in diameter, and its surface has an albedo between 0.160 and 0.177 (without preliminary results). The Collaborative Asteroid Lightcurve Link adopts the results obtained by IRAS, that is, an albedo of 0.1772 and a diameter of 27.75 kilometers with an absolute magnitude of 10.28.

== Naming ==
This minor planet was named for the Crimean Peninsula on the northern coast of the Black Sea, where the discovering Simeiz Observatory is located. Naming citation was first mentioned in The Names of the Minor Planets by Paul Herget in 1955 (H 106).

== See also ==
- Simeiz Observatory
- S-type asteroid
- Asteroid belt
- List of minor planets named after places
- List of minor planets: 1001–2000
