= 916 America =

Main-belt asteroid

Discovery
- Discovered by: G. N. Neujmin
- Discovery date: 7 August 1915

Designations
- Pronunciation: /əˈmɛrɪkə/
- Named after: Americas
- Symbol: (astrological)

Orbital characteristics
- Epoch 31 July 2016 (JD 2457600.5)
- Uncertainty parameter 0
- Observation arc: 92.21 yr (33681 days)
- Aphelion: 2.9247 AU (437.53 Gm)
- Perihelion: 1.8037 AU (269.83 Gm)
- Semi-major axis: 2.3642 AU (353.68 Gm)
- Eccentricity: 0.23706
- Orbital period (sidereal): 3.64 yr (1327.8 d)
- Mean anomaly: 245.58°
- Mean motion: 0° 16^{m} 16.068^{s} / day
- Inclination: 11.093°
- Longitude of ascending node: 329.79°
- Argument of perihelion: 41.772°

Physical characteristics
- Mean radius: 16.615±0.65 km
- Synodic rotation period: 38 h (1.6 d)
- Geometric albedo: 0.0530±0.004
- Absolute magnitude (H): 11.4

916 America is a minor planet orbiting the Sun in the main belt between Mars and Jupiter.

It was discovered on 7 August 1915 by the Russian astronomer Grigory Nikolaevich Neujmin at Simeis, Russian Empire. Originally designated 916^{Σ}I, it was renamed '916 America' on 24 February 1923 after the Council of Astronomers at Pulkovo Observatory decided to commemorate "the friendly relations of the astronomical observatories and astronomers". It was named after the Americas, which is why it was stated that it was named for the American continent. The name was possibly a mark of appreciation for the help given during the 1921 Russian famine by the American Relief Administration under the later President Herbert Hoover.

In 1986, assuming that the asteroid was of S-type and that it had a diameter of 15 km, the rotational period was measured to be 38 hours. Observations by the Infrared Astronomical Satellite have since shown that it has a diameter of 33.2±1.3 km, with an absolute magnitude of 11.20 and an albedo of 0.053±0.004.
