= 1671 Chaika =

Main-belt asteroid

Discovery
- Discovered by: G. Neujmin
- Discovery site: Simeiz Obs.
- Discovery date: 3 October 1934

Designations
- Named after: Valentina Tereshkova (Soviet cosmonaut)
- Alternative designations: 1934 TD · 1930 WE; 1952 BX · 1955 XA; 1963 SO · 1971 RC; A907 GM
- Minor planet category: main-belt · (middle) background · Astraea

Orbital characteristics
- Epoch 27 April 2019 (JD 2458600.5)
- Uncertainty parameter 0
- Observation arc: 87.90 yr (32,107 d)
- Aphelion: 3.2516 AU
- Perihelion: 1.9223 AU
- Semi-major axis: 2.5870 AU
- Eccentricity: 0.2569
- Orbital period (sidereal): 4.16 yr (1,520 d)
- Mean anomaly: 80.231°
- Mean motion: 0° 14^{m} 12.84^{s} / day
- Inclination: 3.9660°
- Longitude of ascending node: 177.17°
- Argument of perihelion: 250.27°

Physical characteristics
- Mean diameter: 7.478±0.728 km 9.37±0.46 km 10.222±0.048 km 13.29±1.71 km
- Synodic rotation period: 3.7718±0.0002 h
- Geometric albedo: 0.120; 0.145; 0.2463; 0.291
- Spectral type: S (assumed)
- Absolute magnitude (H): 12.1

1671 Chaika, provisional designation 1934 TD, is a background asteroid from the Astraea region in the central asteroid belt, approximately 10 kilometers (6 miles) in diameter. It was discovered on 3 October 1934, by Soviet astronomer Grigory Neujmin at the Simeiz Observatory on the Crimean peninsula. The assumed S-type asteroid has a rotation period of 3.8 hours. It was named for Soviet cosmonaut Valentina Tereshkova.

== Orbit and classification ==
According to a HCM-analysis by Nesvorný, Chaika is a non-family asteroid from the main belt's background population, while for Milani and Knežević, it is a member of the larger Astraea family, named after 5 Astraea. The Astraea family is not recognized by Nesvorný as a collisional asteroid family, who rather considers it an artifact in the model due to a resonant alignment.

It orbits the Sun in the central asteroid belt at a distance of 1.9–3.3 AU once every 4 years and 2 months (1,520 days; semi-major axis of 2.59 AU). Its orbit has an eccentricity of 0.26 and an inclination of 4° with respect to the ecliptic. The asteroid was first observed at the Lowell Observatory in April 1907. The body's observation arc begins at the Tokyo Observatory (389) in November 1930, almost 4 years prior to its official discovery observation at Simeiz–Crimea.

== Naming ==
This minor planet was named in honor of Soviet cosmonaut Valentina "Chaika" Tereshkova (born 1937). Tereshkova received the call sign "Chaika" – the Russian word for seagull – as she was the first woman to fly in space. The asteroid's name was proposed by the Institute of Theoretical Astronomy (ITA) in St Petersburg. The official naming citation was published by the Minor Planet Center on 1 June 1967 (M.P.C. 2740).

== Physical characteristics ==
Chaika is an assumed, stony S-type asteroid.

=== Rotation period ===
In November 2005, a rotational lightcurve of Chaika was obtained from photometric observations by Italian astronomers Roberto Crippa, Federico Manzini and Josep Coloma. Lightcurve analysis gave a rotation period of 3.7718±0.0002 hours with a brightness variation of 0.18 magnitude (U=3). John Menke in collaboration with Walter Cooney and David Higgins determined a concurring period of 3.774±0.003 hours with an amplitude of 0.20 magnitude (U=3).

=== Diameter and albedo ===
According to the surveys carried out by the Japanese Akari satellite and the NEOWISE mission of NASA's Wide-field Infrared Survey Explorer, Chaika measures between 7.5 and 13.3 kilometers in diameter and its surface has an albedo between 0.12 and 0.29. The Collaborative Asteroid Lightcurve Link assumes a standard albedo for a stony asteroid of 0.20 and calculates a diameter of 11.30 kilometers based on an absolute magnitude of 12.1.
