= 1099 Figneria =

Main-belt asteroid

Discovery
- Discovered by: G. Neujmin
- Discovery site: Simeiz Obs.
- Discovery date: 13 September 1928

Designations
- Named after: Vera Figner (Russian revolutionary activist)
- Alternative designations: 1928 RQ · 1952 BM; A917 UF
- Minor planet category: main-belt · (outer)

Orbital characteristics
- Epoch 4 September 2017 (JD 2458000.5)
- Uncertainty parameter 0
- Observation arc: 88.72 yr (32,404 days)
- Aphelion: 4.0624 AU
- Perihelion: 2.2973 AU
- Semi-major axis: 3.1799 AU
- Eccentricity: 0.2775
- Orbital period (sidereal): 5.67 yr (2,071 days)
- Mean anomaly: 260.48°
- Mean motion: 0° 10^{m} 25.68^{s} / day
- Inclination: 11.839°
- Longitude of ascending node: 22.247°
- Argument of perihelion: 347.76°

Physical characteristics
- Dimensions: 23.309±0.404 km 25.13±0.41 km 29.39±6.3 km 29.55 km (derived)
- Synodic rotation period: 13.577±0.001 h 13.583±0.0160 h
- Geometric albedo: 0.1415±0.087; 0.1683 (derived); 0.197±0.008; 0.2249±0.0254; 0.225±0.025
- Spectral type: LS · K · C
- Absolute magnitude (H): 9.917±0.002 (R) · 10.2 · 10.40 · 10.40±0.26

1099 Figneria, provisional designation 1928 RQ, is an asteroid from the background population of the outer regions of the asteroid belt, approximately 26 kilometers in diameter. Discovered by Grigory Neujmin at Simeiz Observatory in 1928, the asteroid was later named after Russian revolutionary activist Vera Figner.

== Discovery ==
Figneria was discovered by Soviet astronomer Grigory Neujmin at the Simeiz Observatory on the Crimean peninsula on 13 September 1928. On the same night, it was independently discovered by German astronomer Max Wolf at the Heidelberg Observatory in southwest Germany. (Note: Observation at Heidelberg on 13 September 1928, as per HD 17 – Mitteilungen der Landessternwarte Heidelberg) The Minor Planet Center, however, only acknowledges the first discoverer.

In October 1927, the asteroid was first identified as A917 UF at Simeiz, where the body's observation arc begins 11 months later with its official discovery observation.

== Orbit and classification ==
Figneria is a non-family asteroid of the main belt's background population. It orbits the Sun in the outer main belt at a distance of 2.3–4.1 AU once every 5 years and 8 months (2,071 days). Its orbit has an eccentricity of 0.28 and an inclination of 12° with respect to the ecliptic.

== Physical characteristics ==
PanSTARRS photometric survey gave Figneria a spectral type of an L- and S-type asteroid, while it has been characterized as a K-type asteroid based on polarimetric observations. The asteroid is also an assumed carbonaceous C-type asteroid.

=== Rotation period ===
In September 2007, a rotational lightcurve of Figneria was obtained by astronomer Julian Oey at the Kingsgrove (E19) and Leura Observatories (E17) in Australia. Lightcurve analysis gave a rotation period of 13.577 hours with a brightness variation of 0.16 magnitude (U=3-). In January 2014, photometric observations at the Palomar Transient Factory in California gave a period of 13.583 hours and an amplitude of 0.15 magnitude (U=2).

=== Diameter and albedo ===
According to the surveys carried out by the Infrared Astronomical Satellite IRAS, the Japanese Akari satellite and the NEOWISE mission of NASA's Wide-field Infrared Survey Explorer, Figneria measures between 23.309 and 29.39 kilometers in diameter and its surface has an albedo between 0.1415 and 0.225.

The Collaborative Asteroid Lightcurve Link derives an albedo of 0.1683 and a diameter of 29.55 kilometers based on an absolute magnitude of 10.2.

== Naming ==
This minor planet was named by the discoverer after Vera Figner (1852–1942), a Russian writer and revolutionary political activist. The official naming citation was published in the Planetenzirkular des Astronomischen Rechen-Institut (RI 789).
