= 769 Tatjana =

Main-belt asteroid

Discovery
- Discovered by: G. N. Neujmin
- Discovery site: Simeiz Observatory
- Discovery date: 6 October 1913

Designations
- Alternative designations: 1913 TA

Orbital characteristics
- Epoch 31 July 2016 (JD 2457600.5)
- Uncertainty parameter 0
- Observation arc: 101.12 yr (36933 d)
- Aphelion: 3.7589 AU (562.32 Gm)
- Perihelion: 2.5813 AU (386.16 Gm)
- Semi-major axis: 3.1701 AU (474.24 Gm)
- Eccentricity: 0.18574
- Orbital period (sidereal): 5.64 yr (2061.6 d)
- Mean anomaly: 90.8697°
- Mean motion: 0° 10^{m} 28.632^{s} / day
- Inclination: 7.3689°
- Longitude of ascending node: 38.487°
- Argument of perihelion: 253.943°

Physical characteristics
- Mean radius: 53.22±1.3 km 53.135 ± 2.01 km (composite estimate)
- Mass: (1.32±0.52)×10^{18} kg (Note: Calculated from its standard gravitational parameter GM = 0.088±0.035 km^{3}/s^{2}.)
- Mean density: 2.78 g/cm^{3} (Note: Assuming a diameter of 96.7 km.)
- Synodic rotation period: 35.08 h (1.462 d)
- Geometric albedo: 0.0429±0.002
- Absolute magnitude (H): 9.0

769 Tatjana is a minor planet orbiting the Sun. The body was named such after Tatiana Larina, protagonist of Alexander Pushkin's poem "Eugene Onegin". It's possible that the name was suggested by the provisional designation of the asteroid, 1913 TA, but unlike bodies named by Wolf, Knopff and Metcalf in the years 1905–1909, there's no naming pattern to support this.
