= 1137 Raïssa =

Main-belt asteroid

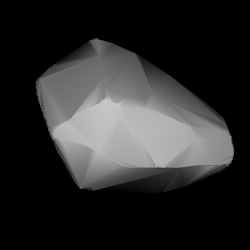
- Shape model of Raïssa from its lightcurve

Discovery
- Discovered by: G. Neujmin
- Discovery site: Simeiz Obs.
- Discovery date: 27 October 1929

Designations
- Named after: Raïssa Maseeva (Russian astronomer)
- Alternative designations: 1929 WB · A908 BB; A910 TB · A924 JA
- Minor planet category: main-belt · (inner); background

Orbital characteristics
- Epoch 4 September 2017 (JD 2458000.5)
- Uncertainty parameter 0
- Observation arc: 113.28 yr (41,374 days)
- Aphelion: 2.6600 AU
- Perihelion: 2.1865 AU
- Semi-major axis: 2.4233 AU
- Eccentricity: 0.0977
- Orbital period (sidereal): 3.77 yr (1,378 days)
- Mean anomaly: 132.76°
- Mean motion: 0° 15^{m} 40.68^{s} / day
- Inclination: 4.3162°
- Longitude of ascending node: 78.455°
- Argument of perihelion: 277.00°

Physical characteristics
- Mean diameter: 19.421±0.192 km 20.029±0.132 km 21.21±0.55 km 23.66 km (derived); 23.69±1.1 km
- Synodic rotation period: 142.79±0.01 h
- Pole ecliptic latitude: (222.0°, −66°) (λ_{1}/β_{1}); (40.0°, −77.0°) (λ_{2}/β_{2})
- Geometric albedo: 0.1538 (derived); 0.1592±0.015; 0.206±0.013; 0.2207±0.0712; 0.228±0.027
- Spectral type: S (assumed); B–V = 0.950; U–B = 0.350
- Absolute magnitude (H): 10.6 · 10.74 · 10.78

1137 Raïssa (prov. designation: 1929 WB) is a stony background asteroid and slow rotator, approximately 22 kilometers (14 miles) in diameter, located in the inner regions of the asteroid belt. It was discovered by Grigory Neujmin at Simeiz Observatory in 1929, and named in memory of Raïssa Maseeva, who worked at the Pulkovo Observatory.

== Discovery ==
Raïssa was discovered on 27 October 1929, by Soviet astronomer Grigory Neujmin at the Simeiz Observatory on the Crimean peninsula. In the following month, it was independently discovered by German Karl Reinmuth at the Heidelberg Observatory on 21 November 1929. The Minor Planet Center only acknowledges the first discoverer. The asteroid's observation arc begins at the United States Naval Observatory in December 1903, almost 26 years prior to its official discovery observation at Simeiz. Its first identification as A908 BB was made at Heidelberg in January 1908.

== Orbit and classification ==
Raïssa is a non-family asteroid of the main belt's background population when applying the hierarchical clustering method to its proper orbital elements. It orbits the Sun in the inner asteroid belt at a distance of 2.2–2.7 AU once every 3 years and 9 months (1,378 days). Its orbit has an eccentricity of 0.10 and an inclination of 4° with respect to the ecliptic.

== Naming ==
This minor planet was named in memory of Raïssa Izrailevna Maseeva (1900–1930), a scientific collaborator who worked at the Pulkovo Observatory. The official naming citation was mentioned in The Names of the Minor Planets by Paul Herget in 1955 (H 106).

== Physical characteristics ==
Raïssa is an assumed stony S-type asteroid.

=== Slow rotator ===
In October 2010, a rotational lightcurve of Raïssa was obtained from photometric observations at the Bigmuskie Observatory (B88), Italy, and the Etscorn Campus (719) and Organ Mesa Observatory (G50) in New Mexico, United States. Lightcurve analysis gave a rotation period of 142.79 hours with a brightness variation of 0.56 magnitude (U=3-). Previous observations with a shorter period were superseded.

With a rotation period of close to six Earth days, Raïssa is a slow rotator as most asteroids have periods of 20 hours or less. Collaborations of observers located on different longitudes, e.g. in the U.S. and Europe are especially important for asteroids with very long periods. The observers can follow the bodies brightness variation at different starting points and thereby cover parts of the lightcurve that were missed by other observers during their daytime.

=== Poles ===
In 2016, a modeled lightcurve using photometric data from various sources gave a concurring period of 143.644±0.005 hours and two spin axis of (222.0°, −66°) and (40.0°, −77.0°) in ecliptic coordinates.

=== Diameter and albedo ===
According to the surveys carried out by the Infrared Astronomical Satellite IRAS, the Japanese Akari satellite and the NEOWISE mission of NASA's Wide-field Infrared Survey Explorer, Raïssa measures between 19.421 and 23.69 kilometers in diameter and its surface has an albedo between 0.1592 and 0.228. The Collaborative Asteroid Lightcurve Link derives an albedo of 0.1538 and a diameter of 23.66 kilometers based on an absolute magnitude of 10.78.
