= 1146 Biarmia =

Metallic main-belt asteroid

Discovery
- Discovered by: G. Neujmin
- Discovery site: Simeiz Obs.
- Discovery date: 7 May 1929

Designations
- Pronunciation: /biˈɑːrmiə/
- Named after: Bjarmaland (Permia) (territory in Norse sagas)
- Alternative designations: 1929 JF · 1941 WD_{1} A913 KA
- Minor planet category: main-belt · (outer)

Orbital characteristics
- Epoch 4 September 2017 (JD 2458000.5)
- Uncertainty parameter 0
- Observation arc: 87.88 yr (32,098 days)
- Aphelion: 3.8212 AU
- Perihelion: 2.2678 AU
- Semi-major axis: 3.0445 AU
- Eccentricity: 0.2551
- Orbital period (sidereal): 5.31 yr (1,940 days)
- Mean anomaly: 184.40°
- Mean motion: 0° 11^{m} 7.8^{s} / day
- Inclination: 17.067°
- Longitude of ascending node: 213.89°
- Argument of perihelion: 63.801°

Physical characteristics
- Dimensions: 21.59±1.52 km 31.14±1.2 km 32.39±0.97 km 32.925±0.148 km 38.567±0.735 km
- Synodic rotation period: 5.33±0.01 h 5.468±0.004 h 5.4700±0.0002 h (Note: Lightcurve plot of 1146 Biarmia with a period of 5.47 hours. Brian D. Warner. Note by Warner: "Originally reported in MPB 27, 4-6 with P = 11.514 and A = 0.32. Reanalysis found revised period of P = 5.33, which disagrees with the 5.47 found by Durkee. The curve above is plotted to the Durkee period, which does give a better fit than with 5.33 h."); 11.514±0.004 h 21.6 h (retracted) (Note: Behrend (2008) web: obs. date: 27 January 2008. Rotation period 21.6 hours with a brightness amplitude of 0.07 mag. Summary figures for (1146) Biarmia at Collaborative Asteroid Lightcurve Link (CALL). Lightcurve was removed from website by Raoul Behrend.)
- Geometric albedo: 0.1436±0.0147; 0.196±0.024; 0.219±0.015; 0.2190±0.018; 0.455±0.096
- Spectral type: Tholen = X · M B–V = 0.690; U–B = 0.247
- Absolute magnitude (H): 9.80 · 9.99±0.33

1146 Biarmia, provisional designation 1929 JF, is a metallic background asteroid from the outer regions of the asteroid belt, approximately 32 kilometers in diameter. It was discovered on 7 May 1929, by Russian astronomer Grigory Neujmin at the Simeiz Observatory on the Crimean peninsula. The asteroid was named for the Bjarmaland mentioned in Norse sagas.

== Orbit and classification ==
Biarmia is not a member of any known asteroid family. It orbits the Sun in the outer main-belt at a distance of 2.3–3.8 AU once every 5 years and 4 months (1,940 days). Its orbit has an eccentricity of 0.26 and an inclination of 17° with respect to the ecliptic.

The asteroid was first identified as A913 KA at Winchester Observatory (799) in June 1913. The body's observation arc begins with its official discovery observation at Simeiz.

== Physical characteristics ==
Biarmia has been characterized in several observations as a metallic M-type asteroid. In the Tholen classification, it is an X-type asteroid which also includes the M-types as a subgroup.

=== Rotation period ===
The best-rated rotational lightcurves of Biarmia were obtained from photometric observations at the Etscorn Observatory (719), New Mexico, and at the S.O.S. Observatory (H39) in Minnesota, United States. Lightcurve analysis gave a rotation period of 5.468 and 5.4700 hours with a brightness amplitude of 0.22 and 0.20 magnitude, respectively (U=3/3).

Other observations received a lower rating or have since been retracted. Warner's period of 11.514 hours was later revised to 5.33 (U=2).

=== Diameter and albedo ===
According to the surveys carried out by the Infrared Astronomical Satellite IRAS, the Japanese Akari satellite and the NEOWISE mission of NASA's Wide-field Infrared Survey Explorer, Biarmia measures between 21.59 and 38.567 kilometers in diameter and its surface has an albedo between 0.1436 and 0.455.

The Collaborative Asteroid Lightcurve Link adopts the results obtained by IRAS, that is, a stony albedo of 0.2190 and a diameter of 31.14 kilometers based on an absolute magnitude of 9.80.

== Naming ==
This minor planet was named for the Bjarmaland mentioned in Norse sagas. This legendary territory probably refers to the Russian region around Arkhangelsk on the White Sea near the Finnish border. The official naming citation was mentioned in The Names of the Minor Planets by Paul Herget in 1955 (H 107).
