= 751 Faïna =

Very large background asteroid

Discovery
- Discovered by: G. Neujmin
- Discovery site: Simeiz Obs.
- Discovery date: 28 April 1913

Designations
- Named after: Faina Neujmina (Wife of the discoverer)
- Alternative designations: A913 HE · 1913 RK
- Minor planet category: main-belt · (middle); Faïna · background

Orbital characteristics
- Epoch 31 May 2020 (JD 2459000.5)
- Uncertainty parameter 0
- Observation arc: 106.97 yr (39,072 d)
- Aphelion: 2.9387 AU
- Perihelion: 2.1657 AU
- Semi-major axis: 2.5522 AU
- Eccentricity: 0.1514
- Orbital period (sidereal): 4.08 yr (1,489 d)
- Mean anomaly: 293.41°
- Mean motion: 0° 14^{m} 30.12^{s} / day
- Inclination: 15.600°
- Longitude of ascending node: 78.849°
- Argument of perihelion: 302.26°

Physical characteristics
- Dimensions: 132.0 km × 88.2 km
- Mean diameter: 106.86±1.15 km (composite estimate) Individual estimates: 106.81±1.28 km; 110.50±4.3 km; 113.699±2.449 km
- Mass: (3.67±0.638)×10^{18} kg (composite estimate) (9.9±1.8)×10^{17} kg (Note: Calculated from its standard gravitational parameter GM = 0.066±0.012 km^{3}/s^{2}.)
- Mean density: 5.74±1.02 g/cm^{3} 1.29 g/cm^{3} (Note: Assuming a diameter of 114 km.)
- Synodic rotation period: 23.678 h
- Geometric albedo: 0.047±0.013; 0.0497±0.004; 0.055±0.002
- Spectral type: Tholen = C; SMASS = Ch; U–B = 0.376±0.030; B–V = 0.685±0.018
- Absolute magnitude (H): 8.66; 8.7

751 Faïna (prov. designation: A913 HE or 1913 RK) is a very large background asteroid from the central regions of the asteroid belt, approximately 110 kilometers (68 miles) in diameter. It was discovered on 28 April 1913, by Russian astronomer Grigory Neujmin at the Simeiz Observatory on the Crimean peninsula. The elongated C-type asteroid (Ch) has a rotation period of 23.7 hours. It was named after Faina Mikhajlovna Neujmina, colleague and first wife of the discoverer.

== Orbit and classification ==
Located close to the region of the stony Eunomia family (502), Faïna is a non-family asteroid of the main belt's background population when applying the modern synthetic hierarchical clustering method (HCM) by Nesvorný as well as Milani and Knežević (AstDys). However, in the 1995 HCM-analysis by Zappalà, Faïna is the parent body of the tiny Faïna family, which is not recognized by modern analysis. The HCM-method is based on an object's proper orbital elements to group asteroids into families.

Faïna orbits the Sun in the central asteroid belt at a distance of 2.2–2.9 AU once every 4 years and 1 month (1,489 days; semi-major axis of 2.55 AU). Its orbit has an eccentricity of 0.15 and an inclination of 16° with respect to the ecliptic. The body's observation arc begins at Vienna Observatory on 8 May 2013, or two weeks after its official discovery observation by Grigory Neujmin at Simeiz.

== Naming ==
This minor planet was named after Faina Mikhajlovna Neujmina, the first wife of the discoverer. Astronomer Lutz Schmadel compiled this naming citation, based on his private communication with "N. S. Samojlova-Yakhontova", as neither the Minor Planet Circulars nor The Names of the Minor Planets give any information about this asteroid's name.

== Physical characteristics ==
In the Tholen classification, Faïna is a common, carbonaceous C-type asteroid, while in the Bus–Binzel SMASS classification, it is a hydrated carbonaceous Ch-type.

=== Rotation period ===
In late 1988, a rotational lightcurve of Faïna was obtained from photometric observations by Richard Miles at the Manley Observatory near Chester in northwest England. Lightcurve analysis gave a well-defined rotation period of 23.678 hours with a brightness variation of 0.36 magnitude (U=3). Alternative observations by Roberto Crippa, Federico Manzini (2006) as well as by Bruno Christmann (2019) determined a period of 10+ and (11.846±0.007) hours (or half the period) with an amplitude of 0.02 and 0.18±0.01 magnitude (U=1/2).

=== Diameter and albedo ===
According to the surveys carried out by the Japanese Akari satellite, the Infrared Astronomical Satellite IRAS, and the NEOWISE mission of NASA's Wide-field Infrared Survey Explorer (WISE), Faïna measures (106.81±1.28), (110.50±4.3) and (113.699±2.449) kilometers in diameter and its surface has a low albedo of (0.055±0.002), (0.0497±0.004) and (0.047±0.013), respectively.

The Collaborative Asteroid Lightcurve Link adopts the results from IRAS, that is, an albedo of 0.0497 and a diameter of 110.50 kilometers based on an absolute magnitude of 8.66. The WISE team also published several alternative mean-diameters of (102.25±33.63 km), (106.289±1.633 km), (123.69±43.48 km), (125.664±33.78 km) and (139.146±33.78 km), with a corresponding albedo of (0.04±0.02), (0.0537±0.0138), (0.03±0.02), (0.0327±0.0263), and (0.027±0.013).

On 28 March 2007, an asteroid occultation of Faïna gave a best-fit ellipse dimension of (132.0 km × 88.2 km) with a quality rating of 2, indicating its irregular, elongated shape. Another occultation on 21 October 2012, gave an ellipse of (125.0 km × 125.0 km). These timed observations are taken when the asteroid passes in front of a distant star.
