= 877 Walküre =

Main-belt asteroid

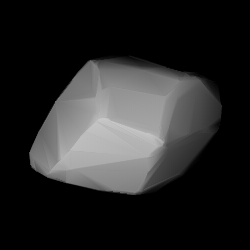
- Modelled shape of Walküre from its lightcurve

Discovery
- Discovered by: G. Neujmin
- Discovery site: Simeiz Obs.
- Discovery date: 13 September 1915

Designations
- Named after: Valkyrie (mythology) and Die Walküre (opera)
- Alternative designations: A915 RV · 1909 GC; A909 GC · 1915 Σ7; 1915 S7
- Minor planet category: main-belt · (inner); background

Orbital characteristics
- Epoch 31 May 2020 (JD 2459000.5)
- Uncertainty parameter 0
- Observation arc: 98.94 yr (36,137 d)
- Aphelion: 2.8854 AU
- Perihelion: 2.0877 AU
- Semi-major axis: 2.4866 AU
- Eccentricity: 0.1604
- Orbital period (sidereal): 3.92 yr (1,432 d)
- Mean anomaly: 222.78°
- Mean motion: 0° 15^{m} 5.04^{s} / day
- Inclination: 4.2555°
- Longitude of ascending node: 116.38°
- Argument of perihelion: 275.82°

Physical characteristics
- Mean diameter: 34.79±8.41 km; 38.41±1.4 km; 39.93±0.51 km
- Synodic rotation period: 17.424±0.004 h
- Pole ecliptic latitude: (68.0°, 58.0°) (λ_{1}/β_{1}); (253.0°, 61.0°) (λ_{2}/β_{2})
- Geometric albedo: 0.05±0.03; 0.058±0.002; 0.0623±0.005
- Spectral type: Tholen = F; C0 (Barucci); C (SDSS-MOC); B–V = 0.636±0.034; U–B = 0.250±0.049
- Absolute magnitude (H): 10.9

877 Walküre (prov. designation: A915 RV or 1915 Σ7) is a dark background asteroid from the inner regions of the asteroid belt, approximately 38 kilometers (24 miles) in diameter. It was discovered on 13 September 1915, by Russian astronomer Grigory Neujmin at the Simeiz Observatory on the Crimean peninsula. The carbonaceous F/C-type asteroid has a rotation period of 17.4 hours and is likely elongated in shape. It was named after the female spirit Valkyrie from Norse mythology, best known from Wagner's opera Die Walküre.

== Orbit and classification ==
Walküre is a non-family asteroid of the main belt's background population when applying the hierarchical clustering method to its proper orbital elements. It orbits the Sun in the inner asteroid belt at a distance of 2.1–2.9 AU once every 3 years and 11 months (1,432 days; semi-major axis of 2.49 AU). Its orbit has an eccentricity of 0.16 and an inclination of 4° with respect to the ecliptic. The asteroid was first observed as A909 GC (1909 GC) at Heidelberg Observatory on 9 April 1909, where the body's observation arc begins on 25 February 1921, more than 5 years after its official discovery observation at Simeiz on 13 September 1915.

== Naming ==
This minor planet was named after the Valkyrie (German: Walküre) a female spirit from Norse mythology. The shield-bearing valkyries decide the fate of warriors in battle, and conduct some of them to Valhalla, the afterlife hall where the fallen heroes are received. Die Walküre (The Valkyrie) is also part of the opera cycle Der Ring des Nibelungen by Richard Wagner (1813–1883), the others being The Rhinegold, Siegfried and the Twilight of the Gods. The asteroid was named by astronomer Sergey Belyavsky and the naming was published in the journal Astronomische Nachrichten in 1923 (AN 219, 401). Asteroids 894 Erda and 890 Waltraut are also named after characters in Wagner's Ring, while 3992 Wagner and 1260 Walhalla are named after the composer and the Walhalla memorial hall of fame, respectively.

== Physical characteristics ==
In the Tholen classification, Walküre is a dark, carbonaceous F-type asteroid, while in the SDSS-based taxonomy and in the Barucci-taxonomy, it is a common carbonaceous C-type and C0-type asteroid, respectively.

=== Rotation period ===
In February 2011, a rotational lightcurve of Walküre was obtained from photometric observations by astronomer Li Bin at the XuYi Station (D29) of the Purple Mountain Observatory in China. Lightcurve analysis gave a rotation period of 17.424±0.004 hours with a brightness variation of 0.44±0.03 magnitude, indicative of an elongated shape (U=3−). The result supersedes observations by Richard Binzel (1982) and René Roy (2005), who determined a period of 17.49 and 17.44±0.02 with an amplitude of 0.40 and 0.33±0.01 magnitude, respectively (U=2/2).

=== Poles ===
Two lightcurves, published in 2016, using modeled photometric data from the Lowell Photometric Database (LPD) and other sources, gave a concurring sidereal period of 17.4217±0.0001 and 17.4217±0.0005 hours, respectively. Each modeled lightcurve also determined two spin axes of (68.0°, 58.0°) and (253.0°, 61.0°), as well as (262.0°, 71.0°) and (47.0°, 66.0°) in ecliptic coordinates (λ,β).

=== Diameter and albedo ===
According to the surveys carried out by the NEOWISE mission of NASA's Wide-field Infrared Survey Explorer (WISE), the Japanese Akari satellite, and the Infrared Astronomical Satellite IRAS, Walküre measures (34.79±8.41), (38.41±1.4) and (39.93±0.51) kilometers in diameter and its surface has an albedo of (0.05±0.03), (0.0623±0.005) and (0.058±0.002), respectively. The Collaborative Asteroid Lightcurve Link derives an albedo of 0.0634 and gives a diameter of 38.41 kilometers (identical to IRAS) based on an absolute magnitude of 10.69. Alternative mean-diameter measurements published by the WISE team include (37.34±9.49 km) and (42.553±15.236 km) with corresponding albedos of (0.05±0.02) and (0.037±0.020).
