= 1147 Stavropolis =

Stony background asteroid

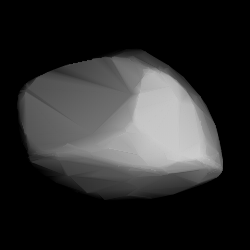
- Shape model of Stavropolis from its lightcurve

Discovery
- Discovered by: G. Neujmin
- Discovery site: Simeiz Obs.
- Discovery date: 11 June 1929

Designations
- Named after: Stavropol (Russian city)
- Alternative designations: 1929 LF · 1946 KA
- Minor planet category: main-belt · (inner); background

Orbital characteristics
- Epoch 4 September 2017 (JD 2458000.5)
- Uncertainty parameter 0
- Observation arc: 87.80 yr (32,068 days)
- Aphelion: 2.7977 AU
- Perihelion: 1.7439 AU
- Semi-major axis: 2.2708 AU
- Eccentricity: 0.2320
- Orbital period (sidereal): 3.42 yr (1,250 days)
- Mean anomaly: 271.25°
- Mean motion: 0° 17^{m} 16.8^{s} / day
- Inclination: 3.8806°
- Longitude of ascending node: 265.22°
- Argument of perihelion: 15.742°

Physical characteristics
- Mean diameter: 10.94±0.29 km 13.430±0.197 km 13.898±0.157 km 13.92±0.84 km 14.89 km (calculated)
- Synodic rotation period: 5.66070±0.00003 h
- Pole ecliptic latitude: (78.0°, −50.0°) (λ_{1}/β_{1}); (267.0°, −51.0°) (λ_{2}/β_{2})
- Geometric albedo: 0.145±0.019; 0.1460±0.0215; 0.155±0.036; 0.20 (assumed); 0.406±0.058
- Spectral type: SMASS = S; Sw(Bus–DeMeo)
- Absolute magnitude (H): 11.40 · 11.5 · 12.00

1147 Stavropolis (prov. designation: 1929 LF) is a stony background asteroid from the inner regions of the asteroid belt. It was discovered on 11 June 1929, by Georgian–Russian astronomer Grigory Neujmin at the Simeiz Observatory on the Crimean peninsula. The S-type asteroid has a rotation period of 5.7 hours and measures approximately 14 kilometers (9 miles) in diameter. It was named after the Russian city of Stavropol.

== Orbit and classification ==
Stavropolis is a non-family asteroid of the main belt's background population when applying the hierarchical clustering method to its proper orbital elements. It orbits the Sun in the inner asteroid belt at a distance of 1.7–2.8 AU once every 3 years and 5 months (1,250 days). Its orbit has an eccentricity of 0.23 and an inclination of 4° with respect to the ecliptic. The body's observation arc begins at with its official discovery observation at Simeiz.

== Naming ==
This minor planet was named by the discover after the Russian city of Stavropol, located in northern Caucasus region. From 1936 to 1946, the city was named "Woroschilowsk". The naming was mentioned in The Names of the Minor Planets by Paul Herget in 1955 (H 107).

== Physical characteristics ==
In the Bus–Binzel SMASS classification, Stavropolis is a common stony S-type asteroid, while in the Bus–DeMeo classification, it is an Sw-subtype.

=== Rotation period and poles ===
In September 2001, a rotational lightcurve of Stavropolis was obtained from photometric observations by Americans Larry Robinson and Brian Warner at the Sunflower (739) and Palmer Divide Observatory (716) in Kansas and Colorado, respectively. Lightcurve analysis gave a rotation period of 5.66±0.01 hours with a brightness variation of 0.42 magnitude (U=3).

In October 2015, another lightcurve was obtained by French amateur astronomer Pierre Antonini. It gave a well-defined period of 5.66070±0.00003 hours with an amplitude of 0.32 magnitude (U=3). A 2016-published lightcurve, using modeled photometric data from the Lowell Photometric Database (LPD), gave a concurring period of 5.66079±0.00001 hours, as well as two spin axes of (78.0°, −50.0°) and (267.0°, −51.0°) in ecliptic coordinates (λ, β).

=== Diameter and albedo ===
According to the survey carried out by the NEOWISE mission of NASA's Wide-field Infrared Survey Explorer, Stavropolis measures between 10.94 and 13.898 kilometers in diameter and its surface has an albedo between 0.146 and 0.406, while the Japanese Akari satellite found a diameter of 13.92 kilometers with an albedo of 0.145. The Collaborative Asteroid Lightcurve Link assumes a standard albedo for stony asteroids of 0.20 and calculates a diameter of 14.89 kilometers based on an absolute magnitude of 11.5.
