= 1158 Luda =

Main-belt asteroid

Discovery
- Discovered by: G. Neujmin
- Discovery site: Simeiz Obs.
- Discovery date: 31 August 1929

Designations
- Named after: Ludmilla Neujmin (discoverer's sister)
- Alternative designations: 1929 QF · 1954 UQ_{1} 1958 TG_{1} · 1972 GC
- Minor planet category: main-belt · Maria · Eunomia

Orbital characteristics
- Epoch 16 February 2017 (JD 2457800.5)
- Uncertainty parameter 0
- Observation arc: 87.27 yr (31,876 days)
- Aphelion: 2.8532 AU
- Perihelion: 2.2742 AU
- Semi-major axis: 2.5637 AU
- Eccentricity: 0.1129
- Orbital period (sidereal): 4.11 yr (1,499 days)
- Mean anomaly: 56.051°
- Mean motion: 0° 14^{m} 24.36^{s} / day
- Inclination: 14.834°
- Longitude of ascending node: 344.74°
- Argument of perihelion: 56.226°

Physical characteristics
- Dimensions: 18.636±0.207 km 18.70±0.48 km 19.06±0.8 km (IRAS:8); 20.596±0.130 km
- Synodic rotation period: 6.86±0.01 h 6.863±0.005 h 6.870±0.005 h 6.90±0.01 h 7.44 h
- Geometric albedo: 0.2025±0.0548; 0.221±0.034; 0.2329±0.022 (IRAS:8); 0.253±0.015
- Spectral type: S
- Absolute magnitude (H): 10.8 · 10.95±0.33

1158 Luda, provisional designation 1929 QF, is a stony asteroid from the middle regions of the asteroid belt, approximately 19 kilometers in diameter. It was discovered on 31 August 1929, by Soviet astronomer Grigory Neujmin at Simeiz Observatory on the Crimean peninsula. It was named after Ludmilla Neujmin, the sister of the discoverer.

== Orbit and classification ==
Luda orbits the Sun at a distance of 2.3–2.9 AU once every 4 years and 1 month (1,499 days). Its orbit has an eccentricity of 0.11 and an inclination of 15° with respect to the ecliptic. The body's observation arc begins with its first used observation at Johannesburg Observatory, one month after its official discovery observation at Simeiz. Luda is a stony S-type asteroid.

Based on its orbital elements, Luda is a member of the Eunomia family, a large group of stony asteroids and the most prominent family in the intermediate main-belt, while Argentine astronomer Alvarez-Candal from the Universidad Nacional de Córdoba groups it into the smaller Maria family, which is named after 170 Maria (the same discrepancy exists for 9175 Graun and 2429 Schürer).

== Physical characteristics ==
=== Photometry ===
Several rotational lightcurves of Luda were obtained from photometric observations. Analysis of the best-rated lightcurves obtained by French amateur astronomer Laurent Bernasconi, American astronomer Brian Warner, and an international group led by Korean astronomers, gave a well-defined rotation period between 6.86 and 6.87 hours with a brightness variation between 0.13 and 0.22 magnitude (U=3/3-/3). Photometric observations also gave a period of 6.9 and 7.44 hours, but these were derived from a fragmentary and ambiguous light curve, respectively.(U=1/2).

=== Diameter and albedo ===
According to the surveys carried out by the Infrared Astronomical Satellite IRAS, the Japanese Akari satellite, and NASA's Wide-field Infrared Survey Explorer with its subsequent NEOWISE mission, Luda measures between 18.63 and 20.59 kilometers in diameter and its surface has an albedo between 0.20 and 0.25. The Collaborative Asteroid Lightcurve Link adopts the results obtained by IRAS, that is, an albedo of 0.232 and a diameter of 19.06 kilometers with an absolute magnitude of 10.8.

== Naming ==
This minor planet was named for Ludmilla Neujmin, the sister of the discoverer. "Luda" is a diminutive of Ludmilla. Astronomer Lutz Schmadel, who compiled this naming citation, based it on a private communication with "N. S. Samojlova-Yakhontova", as neither the Minor Planet Circulars nor The Names of the Minor Planets give any information about this asteroid's name.
