= 1202 Marina =

Main-belt asteroid

Discovery
- Discovered by: G. Neujmin
- Discovery site: Simeiz Obs.
- Discovery date: 13 September 1931

Designations
- Named after: Marina Lavrova–Berg (Soviet scientist)
- Alternative designations: 1931 RL · 1931 TH; 1980 BL_{3} · A924 WG; A924 YA
- Minor planet category: main-belt · (outer); Hilda

Orbital characteristics
- Epoch 4 September 2017 (JD 2458000.5)
- Uncertainty parameter 0
- Observation arc: 92.99 yr (33,964 days)
- Aphelion: 4.6621 AU
- Perihelion: 3.3339 AU
- Semi-major axis: 3.9980 AU
- Eccentricity: 0.1661
- Orbital period (sidereal): 7.99 yr (2,920 days)
- Mean anomaly: 346.16°
- Mean motion: 0° 7^{m} 23.88^{s} / day
- Inclination: 3.3338°
- Longitude of ascending node: 49.880°
- Argument of perihelion: 307.45°
- Jupiter MOID: 0.7908 AU

Physical characteristics
- Dimensions: 54.93±2.6 km 55.07 km (derived); 63.76±1.28 km
- Synodic rotation period: 9.45 h 9.571±0.0042 h
- Geometric albedo: 0.026±0.001; 0.0337±0.003; 0.045 (derived)
- Spectral type: Tholen = P
- Absolute magnitude (H): 9.756±0.001 (R) · 10.0 · 10.09±0.23 · 10.28 · 10.60

1202 Marina (provisional designation 1931 RL) is a primitive Hildian background asteroid from the outermost regions of the asteroid belt, approximately 55 kilometers in diameter. It was discovered by Grigory Neujmin at the Simeiz Observatory in 1931, and later named in honor of Marina Lavrova–Berg, a scientific collaborator at Pulkovo Observatory, who died at an early age during WWII.

== Discovery ==
Marina was discovered on 13 September 1931, by Soviet astronomer Grigory Neujmin at the Simeiz Observatory on the Crimean peninsula. Two nights later, it was independently discovered by German astronomer Karl Reinmuth at the Heidelberg Observatory on 15 September 1931. The Minor Planet Center only recognizes the first discoverer.

The asteroid was first observed as A924 WG at Heidelberg Observatory in November 1924. The body's observation arc also begins at Heidelberg in January 1925, more than 6 years prior to its official discovery observation at Simeiz.

== Orbit and classification ==
Marina is a non-family background asteroid of the Hilda group, located in the outermost region of the main-belt and in a 3:2 resonance with the giant planet Jupiter. It orbits the Sun at a distance of 3.3–4.7 AU once every 7 years and 12 months (2,920 days; semi-major axis of 4.00 AU). Its orbit has an eccentricity of 0.17 and an inclination of 3° with respect to the ecliptic.

== Physical characteristics ==
In the Tholen classification, Marina is a primitive P-type asteroid.

=== Rotation period ===
In the 1990s, a rotational lightcurve of Marina was obtained from a survey of Hildian asteroids by European astronomers. Lightcurve analysis gave a well-defined rotation period of 9.45 hours with a brightness variation of 0.29 magnitude (U=3). In October 2010, photometric observations in the R-band by astronomers at the Palomar Transient Factory in California gave a similar period of 9.571 hours and an amplitude of 0.09 (U=1).

=== Diameter and albedo ===
According to the surveys carried out by the Infrared Astronomical Satellite IRAS and the Japanese Akari satellite, Marina measures 54.93 and 63.76 kilometers in diameter and its surface has a low albedo of 0.0337 and 0.026, respectively.

The Collaborative Asteroid Lightcurve Link derives an albedo of 0.045 and a diameter of 55.07 kilometers based on an absolute magnitude of 10.28.

== Naming ==
This minor planet was named after Marina Davydovna Lavrova–Berg (1898–1943), a scientific collaborator who worked at the Pulkovo Observatory near Saint Petersburg during 1931–1942.
