= 753 Tiflis =

Main-belt asteroid

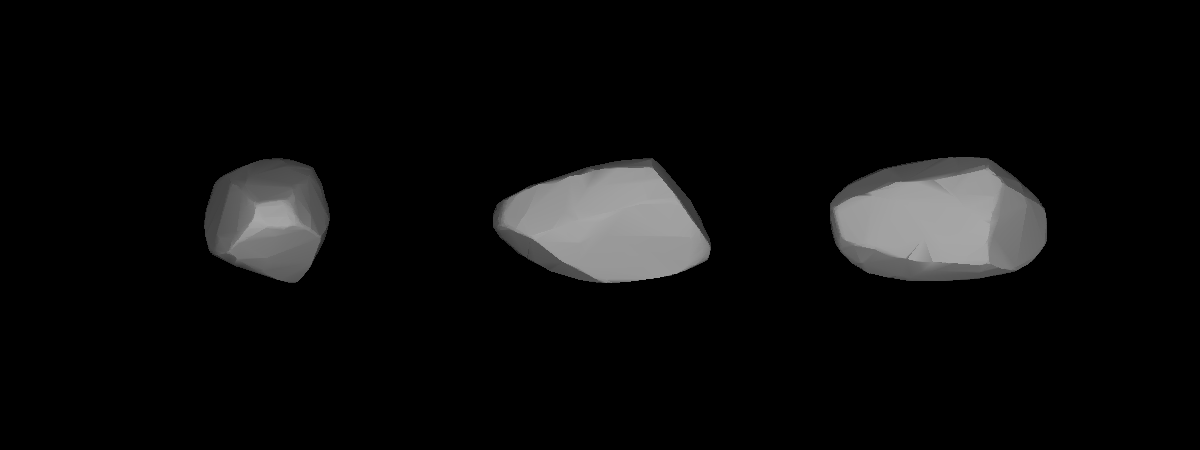
- A three-dimensional model of 753 Tiflis based on its light curve

Discovery
- Discovered by: G. N. Neujmin
- Discovery site: Simeis
- Discovery date: 30 April 1913

Designations
- Pronunciation: /tɪfˈliːs/
- Alternative designations: 1913 RM

Orbital characteristics
- Epoch 31 July 2016 (JD 2457600.5)
- Uncertainty parameter 0
- Observation arc: 108.44 yr (39,609 d)
- Aphelion: 2.8436 AU (425.40 Gm)
- Perihelion: 1.8143 AU (271.42 Gm)
- Semi-major axis: 2.3289 AU (348.40 Gm)
- Eccentricity: 0.22097
- Orbital period (sidereal): 3.55 yr (1,298.2 d)
- Mean anomaly: 346.851°
- Mean motion: 0° 16^{m} 38.316^{s} / day
- Inclination: 10.089°
- Longitude of ascending node: 61.355°
- Argument of perihelion: 202.953°

Physical characteristics
- Mean radius: 11.795±0.9 km
- Synodic rotation period: 9.85 h (0.410 d)
- Geometric albedo: 0.2616±0.046
- Absolute magnitude (H): 10.21

753 Tiflis is a minor planet orbiting the Sun. It was discovered 30 April 1913 by the Georgian–Russian astronomer Grigory N. Neujmin at Simeiz Observatory and was named after Georgia's capital city Tiflis (now called Tbilisi). The object is orbiting the Sun at a distance of 2.33 AU with a period of 3.55 years and an eccentricity (ovalness) of 0.22. The orbital plane is inclined by an angle of 10.1° to the plane of the ecliptic. In 1991, Ruth F. Wolfe included it as a member of the proposed Tiflis asteroid family.

This is classed as an S-type asteroid in the Tholen taxonomy. It spans a girth of approximately 23.6 km and rotates on its axis every 9.85 hours.
