= 829 Academia =

Main-belt asteroid

Discovery
- Discovered by: G. N. Neujmin
- Discovery site: Simeis
- Discovery date: 25 August 1916

Designations
- Pronunciation: /ækəˈdiːmiə/
- Alternative designations: 1916 ZY

Orbital characteristics
- Epoch 31 July 2016 (JD 2457600.5)
- Uncertainty parameter 0
- Observation arc: 101.67 yr (37136 d)
- Aphelion: 2.8379 AU (424.54 Gm)
- Perihelion: 2.3219 AU (347.35 Gm)
- Semi-major axis: 2.5799 AU (385.95 Gm)
- Eccentricity: 0.10000
- Orbital period (sidereal): 4.14 yr (1513.6 d)
- Mean anomaly: 353.330°
- Mean motion: 0° 14^{m} 16.26^{s} / day
- Inclination: 8.2839°
- Longitude of ascending node: 352.504°
- Argument of perihelion: 41.183°
- Earth MOID: 1.33238 AU (199.321 Gm)
- Jupiter MOID: 2.57443 AU (385.129 Gm)
- T_{Jupiter}: 3.403

Physical characteristics
- Mean radius: 21.88±0.65 km
- Synodic rotation period: 7.891 ± 0.005 hr, 7.891 h (0.3288 d)
- Geometric albedo: 0.0484±0.003
- Absolute magnitude (H): 11.0

829 Academia is a minor planet orbiting the Sun. The asteroid is roughly 44 km in diameter and has a low albedo. Photometric measurements of the asteroid made in 2005 at the Palmer Divide Observatory showed a light curve with a period of 7.891 ± 0.005 hours and a brightness variation of 0.44 ± 0.02 in magnitude.
