= List of minor planets: 552001–553000 =

The following is a partial list of minor planets, running from minor-planet number 552001 through 553000, inclusive. The primary data for this and other partial lists is based on JPL's "Small-Body Orbital Elements" and data available from the Minor Planet Center. Critical list information is also provided by the MPC, unless otherwise specified from Lowell Observatory. A detailed description of the table's columns and additional sources are given on the main page including a complete list of every page in this series, and a statistical break-up on the dynamical classification of minor planets.

Also see the summary list of all named bodies in numerical and alphabetical order, and the corresponding naming citations for the number range of this particular list. New namings may only be added to this list after official publication, as the preannouncement of names is condemned by the Working Group for Small Bodies Nomenclature of the International Astronomical Union.

Near-Earth obj.	MBA (inner)	MBA (outer)	Centaur
Mars-crosser	MBA (middle)	Jupiter trojan	Trans-Neptunian obj.
Unclassified

== 552001–552100 ==
Designation			Discovery			Properties		Ref
Permanent	Provisional	Named after	Date	Site	Discoverer(s)	Category	Diam.	Ref
552001	2013 RA_{52}	—	September 29, 2008	Catalina	CSS	EOS	1.9 km	MPC · JPL
552002	2013 RJ_{52}	—	September 11, 2007	Catalina	CSS	THB	2.8 km	MPC · JPL
552003	2013 RN_{52}	—	January 23, 2006	Mount Lemmon	Mount Lemmon Survey	·	1.8 km	MPC · JPL
552004	2013 RB_{56}	—	October 10, 2008	Mount Lemmon	Mount Lemmon Survey	EOS	1.7 km	MPC · JPL
552005	2013 RH_{56}	—	September 22, 2008	Mount Lemmon	Mount Lemmon Survey	·	2.4 km	MPC · JPL
552006	2013 RX_{56}	—	October 31, 2008	Mount Lemmon	Mount Lemmon Survey	EOS	1.6 km	MPC · JPL
552007	2013 RO_{57}	—	September 4, 2008	Kitt Peak	Spacewatch	·	1.6 km	MPC · JPL
552008	2013 RF_{64}	—	August 15, 2013	Haleakala	Pan-STARRS 1	·	2.1 km	MPC · JPL
552009	2013 RL_{64}	—	March 2, 2011	Kitt Peak	Spacewatch	EOS	1.8 km	MPC · JPL
552010	2013 RE_{65}	—	February 21, 2007	Mount Lemmon	Mount Lemmon Survey	·	2.3 km	MPC · JPL
552011	2013 RV_{68}	—	January 7, 2010	Kitt Peak	Spacewatch	EOS	1.8 km	MPC · JPL
552012	2013 RX_{69}	—	October 3, 2002	Palomar	NEAT	·	3.8 km	MPC · JPL
552013	2013 RD_{70}	—	February 14, 2005	Kitt Peak	Spacewatch	·	2.0 km	MPC · JPL
552014	2013 RS_{71}	—	March 11, 2005	Mount Lemmon	Mount Lemmon Survey	·	3.6 km	MPC · JPL
552015	2013 RB_{73}	—	October 7, 2008	Mount Lemmon	Mount Lemmon Survey	·	2.7 km	MPC · JPL
552016	2013 RF_{75}	—	October 15, 2006	Kitt Peak	Spacewatch	·	590 m	MPC · JPL
552017	2013 RM_{76}	—	August 14, 2013	Haleakala	Pan-STARRS 1	·	770 m	MPC · JPL
552018	2013 RQ_{79}	—	November 4, 2002	Kitt Peak	Spacewatch	ERI	1.1 km	MPC · JPL
552019	2013 RC_{81}	—	December 16, 2009	Mount Lemmon	Mount Lemmon Survey	·	1.9 km	MPC · JPL
552020	2013 RF_{87}	—	March 10, 1999	Kitt Peak	Spacewatch	·	2.5 km	MPC · JPL
552021	2013 RK_{87}	—	July 27, 2002	Palomar	NEAT	·	2.9 km	MPC · JPL
552022	2013 RY_{88}	—	October 19, 2006	Catalina	CSS	·	960 m	MPC · JPL
552023	2013 RX_{89}	—	September 14, 2013	Kitt Peak	Spacewatch	·	1.9 km	MPC · JPL
552024	2013 RZ_{89}	—	September 6, 2013	Kitt Peak	Spacewatch	·	1.2 km	MPC · JPL
552025	2013 RH_{90}	—	February 15, 2010	Kitt Peak	Spacewatch	·	2.3 km	MPC · JPL
552026	2013 RP_{90}	—	August 22, 1995	Kitt Peak	Spacewatch	·	510 m	MPC · JPL
552027	2013 RZ_{91}	—	September 14, 2013	Kitt Peak	Spacewatch	EOS	1.5 km	MPC · JPL
552028	2013 RK_{93}	—	May 4, 2005	Mauna Kea	Veillet, C.	VER	2.7 km	MPC · JPL
552029	2013 RY_{94}	—	September 15, 2013	Mount Lemmon	Mount Lemmon Survey	·	2.3 km	MPC · JPL
552030	2013 RE_{95}	—	September 15, 2013	Palomar	Palomar Transient Factory	·	710 m	MPC · JPL
552031	2013 RG_{95}	—	September 4, 2002	Palomar	NEAT	NYS	940 m	MPC · JPL
552032	2013 RB_{96}	—	September 10, 2013	Calar Alto-CASADO	Mottola, S.	·	2.5 km	MPC · JPL
552033	2013 RO_{98}	—	September 8, 2013	Cerro Tololo-DECam	DECam	SDO	215 km	MPC · JPL
552034	2013 RB_{101}	—	September 27, 2003	Kitt Peak	Spacewatch	KOR	1.3 km	MPC · JPL
552035	2013 RN_{101}	—	September 4, 2013	Mount Lemmon	Mount Lemmon Survey	·	2.5 km	MPC · JPL
552036	2013 RS_{101}	—	September 14, 2013	Mount Lemmon	Mount Lemmon Survey	·	2.3 km	MPC · JPL
552037	2013 RD_{108}	—	January 26, 2012	Mount Lemmon	Mount Lemmon Survey	H	480 m	MPC · JPL
552038	2013 RJ_{108}	—	September 10, 2013	Haleakala	Pan-STARRS 1	·	710 m	MPC · JPL
552039	2013 RF_{112}	—	September 13, 2013	Mount Lemmon	Mount Lemmon Survey	·	690 m	MPC · JPL
552040	2013 RJ_{113}	—	September 15, 2013	Haleakala	Pan-STARRS 1	·	2.2 km	MPC · JPL
552041	2013 RC_{115}	—	September 5, 2013	Kitt Peak	Spacewatch	·	2.2 km	MPC · JPL
552042	2013 RV_{116}	—	March 15, 2010	Mount Lemmon	Mount Lemmon Survey	·	3.1 km	MPC · JPL
552043	2013 RF_{119}	—	September 5, 2013	Kitt Peak	Spacewatch	·	3.2 km	MPC · JPL
552044	2013 RJ_{119}	—	February 11, 2016	Haleakala	Pan-STARRS 1	URS	2.5 km	MPC · JPL
552045	2013 RJ_{120}	—	October 9, 2002	Kitt Peak	Spacewatch	THB	2.5 km	MPC · JPL
552046	2013 RJ_{129}	—	September 6, 2013	Mount Lemmon	Mount Lemmon Survey	L5	7.2 km	MPC · JPL
552047	2013 RL_{129}	—	September 19, 1998	Apache Point	SDSS Collaboration	·	1.8 km	MPC · JPL
552048	2013 RC_{131}	—	September 14, 2013	Haleakala	Pan-STARRS 1	EOS	1.6 km	MPC · JPL
552049	2013 RP_{133}	—	September 6, 2013	Mount Lemmon	Mount Lemmon Survey	·	2.2 km	MPC · JPL
552050	2013 RD_{139}	—	September 2, 2013	Mount Lemmon	Mount Lemmon Survey	·	450 m	MPC · JPL
552051	2013 RY_{141}	—	September 14, 2013	Haleakala	Pan-STARRS 1	·	2.1 km	MPC · JPL
552052	2013 SQ	—	September 5, 2013	Kitt Peak	Spacewatch	H	530 m	MPC · JPL
552053	2013 SF_{4}	—	September 17, 2013	Mount Lemmon	Mount Lemmon Survey	·	3.7 km	MPC · JPL
552054	2013 SA_{7}	—	September 17, 2013	Mount Lemmon	Mount Lemmon Survey	·	2.5 km	MPC · JPL
552055	2013 SQ_{8}	—	September 12, 2013	Mount Lemmon	Mount Lemmon Survey	(5651)	2.4 km	MPC · JPL
552056	2013 SY_{10}	—	November 8, 2009	Mount Lemmon	Mount Lemmon Survey	AGN	1.2 km	MPC · JPL
552057	2013 SN_{11}	—	March 13, 2005	Kitt Peak	Spacewatch	V	480 m	MPC · JPL
552058	2013 SA_{13}	—	August 14, 2013	Haleakala	Pan-STARRS 1	·	1.8 km	MPC · JPL
552059	2013 SO_{17}	—	September 24, 2013	Kitt Peak	Spacewatch	·	2.1 km	MPC · JPL
552060	2013 SZ_{17}	—	September 26, 2006	Mount Lemmon	Mount Lemmon Survey	·	770 m	MPC · JPL
552061	2013 SH_{21}	—	April 15, 2012	Haleakala	Pan-STARRS 1	PHO	1.3 km	MPC · JPL
552062	2013 SW_{21}	—	September 19, 1998	Apache Point	SDSS Collaboration	·	1.6 km	MPC · JPL
552063	2013 SS_{22}	—	March 14, 2007	Mount Lemmon	Mount Lemmon Survey	·	1.5 km	MPC · JPL
552064	2013 SH_{28}	—	January 28, 2011	Mount Lemmon	Mount Lemmon Survey	·	1.2 km	MPC · JPL
552065	2013 SA_{30}	—	November 19, 2006	Kitt Peak	Spacewatch	·	900 m	MPC · JPL
552066	2013 SV_{35}	—	April 28, 2011	Haleakala	Pan-STARRS 1	·	3.0 km	MPC · JPL
552067	2013 SH_{38}	—	February 1, 2011	Kitt Peak	Spacewatch	·	830 m	MPC · JPL
552068	2013 SP_{40}	—	July 18, 2013	Haleakala	Pan-STARRS 1	·	2.7 km	MPC · JPL
552069	2013 SG_{44}	—	September 28, 2002	Haleakala	NEAT	HYG	3.0 km	MPC · JPL
552070	2013 SE_{45}	—	September 1, 2013	Mount Lemmon	Mount Lemmon Survey	·	2.0 km	MPC · JPL
552071	2013 SX_{46}	—	September 9, 2013	Haleakala	Pan-STARRS 1	·	2.2 km	MPC · JPL
552072	2013 SJ_{47}	—	September 6, 2008	Mount Lemmon	Mount Lemmon Survey	KOR	1.3 km	MPC · JPL
552073	2013 SK_{49}	—	November 8, 2008	Kitt Peak	Spacewatch	·	1.8 km	MPC · JPL
552074	2013 SK_{50}	—	March 14, 2005	Mount Lemmon	Mount Lemmon Survey	EOS	2.4 km	MPC · JPL
552075	2013 SB_{51}	—	September 25, 2013	Catalina	CSS	·	3.1 km	MPC · JPL
552076	2013 SG_{51}	—	August 18, 2002	Palomar	NEAT	·	780 m	MPC · JPL
552077	2013 SP_{51}	—	August 28, 2002	Palomar	NEAT	·	2.7 km	MPC · JPL
552078	2013 SA_{52}	—	September 9, 2002	Campo Imperatore	CINEOS	·	3.1 km	MPC · JPL
552079	2013 SB_{52}	—	October 12, 2006	Kitt Peak	Spacewatch	·	870 m	MPC · JPL
552080	2013 SF_{55}	—	September 29, 2013	Kitt Peak	Spacewatch	·	1.9 km	MPC · JPL
552081	2013 SV_{55}	—	September 20, 2002	Palomar	NEAT	·	2.9 km	MPC · JPL
552082	2013 SE_{56}	—	October 10, 2002	Palomar	NEAT	·	3.8 km	MPC · JPL
552083	2013 SQ_{58}	—	September 26, 2013	Palomar	Palomar Transient Factory	·	820 m	MPC · JPL
552084	2013 SR_{58}	—	April 19, 2012	Mount Lemmon	Mount Lemmon Survey	JUN	1.2 km	MPC · JPL
552085	2013 ST_{58}	—	October 18, 2004	Kitt Peak	Deep Ecliptic Survey	·	1.8 km	MPC · JPL
552086	2013 SJ_{61}	—	August 5, 2013	Piszkéstető	K. Sárneczky	·	770 m	MPC · JPL
552087	2013 SR_{61}	—	September 24, 2008	Mount Lemmon	Mount Lemmon Survey	·	2.1 km	MPC · JPL
552088	2013 SX_{67}	—	September 24, 2008	Kitt Peak	Spacewatch	·	1.9 km	MPC · JPL
552089	2013 SB_{72}	—	September 6, 2013	Mount Lemmon	Mount Lemmon Survey	·	2.5 km	MPC · JPL
552090	2013 ST_{83}	—	September 28, 2013	Palomar	Palomar Transient Factory	DOR	2.4 km	MPC · JPL
552091	2013 SL_{90}	—	September 26, 2008	Mount Lemmon	Mount Lemmon Survey	·	1.5 km	MPC · JPL
552092	2013 SH_{97}	—	November 19, 2008	Kitt Peak	Spacewatch	·	2.1 km	MPC · JPL
552093	2013 SD_{102}	—	September 30, 2013	Catalina	CSS	·	2.0 km	MPC · JPL
552094	2013 SG_{103}	—	September 17, 2013	Mount Lemmon	Mount Lemmon Survey	·	2.5 km	MPC · JPL
552095	2013 SA_{105}	—	November 19, 2008	Kitt Peak	Spacewatch	·	2.5 km	MPC · JPL
552096	2013 SB_{105}	—	September 28, 2013	Mount Lemmon	Mount Lemmon Survey	·	2.2 km	MPC · JPL
552097	2013 TA_{1}	—	April 20, 2007	Kitt Peak	Spacewatch	·	2.1 km	MPC · JPL
552098	2013 TL_{3}	—	October 1, 2013	Palomar	Palomar Transient Factory	·	2.1 km	MPC · JPL
552099	2013 TK_{7}	—	September 13, 2007	Mount Lemmon	Mount Lemmon Survey	·	3.1 km	MPC · JPL
552100	2013 TP_{9}	—	April 12, 2005	Kitt Peak	Spacewatch	·	3.2 km	MPC · JPL

== 552101–552200 ==
back to top

Designation			Discovery			Properties		Ref
Permanent	Provisional	Named after	Date	Site	Discoverer(s)	Category	Diam.	Ref
552101	2013 TZ_{11}	—	September 3, 2013	Mount Lemmon	Mount Lemmon Survey	·	2.6 km	MPC · JPL
552102	2013 TJ_{12}	—	October 5, 2013	Oukaïmeden	C. Rinner	·	1.8 km	MPC · JPL
552103	2013 TJ_{16}	—	September 9, 2013	Haleakala	Pan-STARRS 1	·	2.6 km	MPC · JPL
552104	2013 TS_{16}	—	October 2, 2008	Mount Lemmon	Mount Lemmon Survey	·	1.7 km	MPC · JPL
552105	2013 TR_{17}	—	January 28, 2004	Kitt Peak	Spacewatch	·	2.3 km	MPC · JPL
552106	2013 TJ_{22}	—	September 14, 2007	Kitt Peak	Spacewatch	·	2.7 km	MPC · JPL
552107	2013 TP_{22}	—	December 1, 2008	Kitt Peak	Spacewatch	THM	1.7 km	MPC · JPL
552108	2013 TY_{25}	—	October 1, 2013	Mount Lemmon	Mount Lemmon Survey	·	2.1 km	MPC · JPL
552109	2013 TZ_{25}	—	February 25, 2011	Mount Lemmon	Mount Lemmon Survey	·	2.7 km	MPC · JPL
552110	2013 TY_{33}	—	May 19, 2005	Siding Spring	SSS	·	1.7 km	MPC · JPL
552111	2013 TC_{34}	—	July 20, 2013	Haleakala	Pan-STARRS 1	·	2.6 km	MPC · JPL
552112	2013 TF_{34}	—	October 15, 2002	Palomar	NEAT	THM	2.4 km	MPC · JPL
552113	2013 TW_{36}	—	March 16, 2001	Kitt Peak	Spacewatch	KOR	1.9 km	MPC · JPL
552114	2013 TX_{38}	—	April 5, 2002	Palomar	NEAT	GEF	1.6 km	MPC · JPL
552115	2013 TP_{39}	—	October 25, 2008	Kitt Peak	Spacewatch	·	1.6 km	MPC · JPL
552116	2013 TG_{41}	—	February 10, 2011	Mount Lemmon	Mount Lemmon Survey	MAS	500 m	MPC · JPL
552117	2013 TU_{41}	—	March 18, 2007	Kitt Peak	Spacewatch	L5	9.9 km	MPC · JPL
552118	2013 TX_{41}	—	April 6, 2011	Mount Lemmon	Mount Lemmon Survey	EOS	1.5 km	MPC · JPL
552119	2013 TA_{42}	—	September 13, 2007	Kitt Peak	Spacewatch	·	2.9 km	MPC · JPL
552120	2013 TT_{43}	—	September 14, 2013	Haleakala	Pan-STARRS 1	·	2.3 km	MPC · JPL
552121	2013 TV_{44}	—	September 13, 2002	Palomar	NEAT	EOS	1.9 km	MPC · JPL
552122	2013 TX_{46}	—	March 26, 2009	Kitt Peak	Spacewatch	L5	8.9 km	MPC · JPL
552123	2013 TB_{48}	—	January 10, 2007	Kitt Peak	Spacewatch	·	1.1 km	MPC · JPL
552124	2013 TZ_{48}	—	October 3, 2013	Haleakala	Pan-STARRS 1	·	2.1 km	MPC · JPL
552125	2013 TA_{51}	—	September 13, 2013	Mount Lemmon	Mount Lemmon Survey	·	770 m	MPC · JPL
552126	2013 TS_{55}	—	September 11, 2007	Mount Lemmon	Mount Lemmon Survey	·	3.0 km	MPC · JPL
552127	2013 TU_{55}	—	October 4, 2013	Mount Lemmon	Mount Lemmon Survey	L5	8.8 km	MPC · JPL
552128	2013 TS_{58}	—	October 4, 2013	Mount Lemmon	Mount Lemmon Survey	VER	2.5 km	MPC · JPL
552129	2013 TA_{61}	—	January 19, 2005	Kitt Peak	Spacewatch	·	1.7 km	MPC · JPL
552130	2013 TB_{66}	—	January 11, 2011	Catalina	CSS	·	1.0 km	MPC · JPL
552131	2013 TF_{71}	—	November 26, 2009	Kitt Peak	Spacewatch	·	1.9 km	MPC · JPL
552132	2013 TP_{71}	—	October 2, 2013	Kitt Peak	Spacewatch	LIX	2.7 km	MPC · JPL
552133	2013 TY_{73}	—	October 3, 2013	Kitt Peak	Spacewatch	·	3.3 km	MPC · JPL
552134	2013 TT_{74}	—	November 7, 2002	Kitt Peak	Deep Ecliptic Survey	·	3.3 km	MPC · JPL
552135	2013 TR_{75}	—	May 12, 2012	Haleakala	Pan-STARRS 1	BRA	1.4 km	MPC · JPL
552136	2013 TH_{76}	—	September 14, 2013	Mount Lemmon	Mount Lemmon Survey	EOS	1.8 km	MPC · JPL
552137	2013 TP_{77}	—	October 3, 2013	Kitt Peak	Spacewatch	·	2.2 km	MPC · JPL
552138	2013 TN_{78}	—	September 23, 2008	Mount Lemmon	Mount Lemmon Survey	EOS	1.5 km	MPC · JPL
552139	2013 TZ_{78}	—	March 16, 2007	Catalina	CSS	·	3.0 km	MPC · JPL
552140	2013 TX_{82}	—	October 9, 2002	Kitt Peak	Spacewatch	·	2.4 km	MPC · JPL
552141	2013 TL_{83}	—	April 24, 2011	Mount Lemmon	Mount Lemmon Survey	EOS	2.0 km	MPC · JPL
552142	2013 TQ_{83}	—	February 11, 2004	Palomar	NEAT	EOS	2.1 km	MPC · JPL
552143	2013 TX_{84}	—	May 12, 2005	Palomar	NEAT	·	1.5 km	MPC · JPL
552144	2013 TH_{86}	—	March 9, 2002	Kitt Peak	Spacewatch	·	1.7 km	MPC · JPL
552145	2013 TR_{86}	—	November 2, 2002	La Palma	A. Fitzsimmons	MAS	510 m	MPC · JPL
552146	2013 TO_{88}	—	July 27, 2009	Catalina	CSS	·	1.2 km	MPC · JPL
552147	2013 TX_{90}	—	October 1, 2013	Mount Lemmon	Mount Lemmon Survey	·	2.1 km	MPC · JPL
552148	2013 TK_{92}	—	October 3, 2002	Socorro	LINEAR	·	2.9 km	MPC · JPL
552149	2013 TL_{92}	—	October 1, 2002	Anderson Mesa	LONEOS	NYS	960 m	MPC · JPL
552150	2013 TX_{93}	—	July 14, 2013	Haleakala	Pan-STARRS 1	·	3.4 km	MPC · JPL
552151	2013 TM_{95}	—	October 1, 2013	Kitt Peak	Spacewatch	NYS	640 m	MPC · JPL
552152	2013 TO_{95}	—	October 30, 2002	Palomar	NEAT	·	3.0 km	MPC · JPL
552153	2013 TY_{95}	—	April 20, 2012	Mount Lemmon	Mount Lemmon Survey	·	2.0 km	MPC · JPL
552154	2013 TT_{96}	—	October 2, 2013	Haleakala	Pan-STARRS 1	·	610 m	MPC · JPL
552155	2013 TU_{96}	—	August 13, 2002	Palomar	NEAT	·	930 m	MPC · JPL
552156	2013 TK_{97}	—	May 8, 2005	Mount Lemmon	Mount Lemmon Survey	MAS	760 m	MPC · JPL
552157	2013 TL_{97}	—	September 16, 2002	Palomar	NEAT	·	1.1 km	MPC · JPL
552158	2013 TK_{98}	—	November 8, 2008	Kitt Peak	Spacewatch	·	2.3 km	MPC · JPL
552159	2013 TW_{104}	—	October 3, 2013	Kitt Peak	Spacewatch	·	1.8 km	MPC · JPL
552160	2013 TY_{107}	—	August 19, 2001	Cerro Tololo	Deep Ecliptic Survey	·	3.3 km	MPC · JPL
552161	2013 TO_{108}	—	October 3, 2013	Kitt Peak	Spacewatch	·	3.2 km	MPC · JPL
552162	2013 TE_{109}	—	October 3, 2013	Mount Lemmon	Mount Lemmon Survey	·	2.2 km	MPC · JPL
552163	2013 TE_{110}	—	May 8, 2011	Mount Lemmon	Mount Lemmon Survey	·	3.2 km	MPC · JPL
552164	2013 TO_{110}	—	September 13, 2013	Palomar	Palomar Transient Factory	·	800 m	MPC · JPL
552165	2013 TK_{113}	—	October 5, 2002	Palomar	NEAT	·	2.3 km	MPC · JPL
552166	2013 TC_{116}	—	September 11, 2002	Haleakala	NEAT	·	2.7 km	MPC · JPL
552167	2013 TB_{117}	—	January 8, 2011	Mount Lemmon	Mount Lemmon Survey	·	2.7 km	MPC · JPL
552168	2013 TW_{120}	—	October 4, 2013	Mount Lemmon	Mount Lemmon Survey	·	1.6 km	MPC · JPL
552169	2013 TH_{122}	—	July 14, 2013	Haleakala	Pan-STARRS 1	V	600 m	MPC · JPL
552170	2013 TU_{126}	—	October 13, 2002	Palomar	NEAT	T_{j} (2.96)	2.8 km	MPC · JPL
552171	2013 TC_{129}	—	September 23, 2008	Kitt Peak	Spacewatch	·	2.5 km	MPC · JPL
552172	2013 TJ_{130}	—	October 20, 2006	Mount Lemmon	Mount Lemmon Survey	·	710 m	MPC · JPL
552173	2013 TV_{130}	—	October 5, 2013	Catalina	CSS	·	4.0 km	MPC · JPL
552174	2013 TE_{141}	—	October 12, 2007	Mount Lemmon	Mount Lemmon Survey	EOS	1.6 km	MPC · JPL
552175	2013 TE_{142}	—	October 9, 2013	Mount Lemmon	Mount Lemmon Survey	THM	2.0 km	MPC · JPL
552176	2013 TR_{142}	—	October 9, 2013	Mount Lemmon	Mount Lemmon Survey	·	2.1 km	MPC · JPL
552177	2013 TL_{143}	—	March 31, 2008	Mount Lemmon	Mount Lemmon Survey	L5	10 km	MPC · JPL
552178	2013 TY_{144}	—	October 1, 2013	Mayhill-ISON	L. Elenin	·	3.1 km	MPC · JPL
552179	2013 TC_{145}	—	September 27, 2002	Palomar	NEAT	·	3.0 km	MPC · JPL
552180	2013 TK_{149}	—	January 29, 2011	Mount Lemmon	Mount Lemmon Survey	·	1.7 km	MPC · JPL
552181	2013 TZ_{154}	—	August 31, 2013	Haleakala	Pan-STARRS 1	·	620 m	MPC · JPL
552182	2013 TX_{162}	—	September 12, 2013	Mount Lemmon	Mount Lemmon Survey	URS	2.4 km	MPC · JPL
552183	2013 TZ_{164}	—	April 27, 2012	Haleakala	Pan-STARRS 1	·	1.7 km	MPC · JPL
552184	2013 TJ_{165}	—	November 7, 2008	Mount Lemmon	Mount Lemmon Survey	·	2.2 km	MPC · JPL
552185	2013 TM_{165}	—	October 10, 2002	Palomar	NEAT	·	2.7 km	MPC · JPL
552186	2013 TO_{166}	—	October 3, 2013	Mount Lemmon	Mount Lemmon Survey	·	2.1 km	MPC · JPL
552187	2013 TW_{167}	—	October 3, 2013	Haleakala	Pan-STARRS 1	·	2.7 km	MPC · JPL
552188	2013 TY_{168}	—	November 9, 2008	Mount Lemmon	Mount Lemmon Survey	EOS	1.6 km	MPC · JPL
552189	2013 TT_{169}	—	February 10, 2011	Mount Lemmon	Mount Lemmon Survey	CLA	1.4 km	MPC · JPL
552190	2013 TU_{169}	—	October 3, 2013	Kitt Peak	Spacewatch	·	2.3 km	MPC · JPL
552191	2013 TO_{170}	—	October 29, 2008	Kitt Peak	Spacewatch	·	1.5 km	MPC · JPL
552192	2013 TV_{173}	—	November 26, 2014	Haleakala	Pan-STARRS 1	·	2.4 km	MPC · JPL
552193	2013 TT_{175}	—	October 5, 2013	Haleakala	Pan-STARRS 1	·	730 m	MPC · JPL
552194	2013 TG_{177}	—	October 2, 2013	Haleakala	Pan-STARRS 1	THM	1.9 km	MPC · JPL
552195	2013 TP_{177}	—	October 14, 2013	Catalina	CSS	PHO	1.0 km	MPC · JPL
552196	2013 TC_{178}	—	October 8, 2013	Mount Lemmon	Mount Lemmon Survey	·	1 km	MPC · JPL
552197	2013 TB_{182}	—	October 2, 2013	Mount Lemmon	Mount Lemmon Survey	·	2.6 km	MPC · JPL
552198	2013 TJ_{182}	—	January 19, 2015	Haleakala	Pan-STARRS 1	·	2.6 km	MPC · JPL
552199	2013 TR_{182}	—	January 13, 2015	Haleakala	Pan-STARRS 1	·	2.5 km	MPC · JPL
552200	2013 TZ_{182}	—	October 12, 2013	Kitt Peak	Spacewatch	·	2.2 km	MPC · JPL

== 552201–552300 ==
back to top

Designation			Discovery			Properties		Ref
Permanent	Provisional	Named after	Date	Site	Discoverer(s)	Category	Diam.	Ref
552201	2013 TQ_{183}	—	October 2, 2013	Haleakala	Pan-STARRS 1	·	2.0 km	MPC · JPL
552202	2013 TR_{183}	—	September 29, 2013	Mount Lemmon	Mount Lemmon Survey	EOS	1.6 km	MPC · JPL
552203	2013 TU_{183}	—	October 14, 2013	Kitt Peak	Spacewatch	·	2.5 km	MPC · JPL
552204	2013 TE_{193}	—	October 15, 2013	Mount Lemmon	Mount Lemmon Survey	·	2.7 km	MPC · JPL
552205	2013 TF_{196}	—	October 1, 2013	Kitt Peak	Spacewatch	EOS	1.6 km	MPC · JPL
552206	2013 TK_{196}	—	October 15, 2013	Kitt Peak	Spacewatch	VER	2.2 km	MPC · JPL
552207	2013 TN_{197}	—	October 3, 2013	Mount Lemmon	Mount Lemmon Survey	EOS	1.9 km	MPC · JPL
552208	2013 TQ_{198}	—	October 9, 2013	Mount Lemmon	Mount Lemmon Survey	·	2.0 km	MPC · JPL
552209	2013 TU_{198}	—	October 5, 2013	Haleakala	Pan-STARRS 1	·	780 m	MPC · JPL
552210	2013 TP_{200}	—	October 5, 2013	Kitt Peak	Spacewatch	EOS	1.4 km	MPC · JPL
552211	2013 TE_{204}	—	October 1, 2013	Mount Lemmon	Mount Lemmon Survey	·	1.8 km	MPC · JPL
552212	2013 TM_{204}	—	October 21, 2008	Mount Lemmon	Mount Lemmon Survey	·	2.6 km	MPC · JPL
552213	2013 UB_{8}	—	October 27, 2013	Elena Remote	Oreshko, A.	·	900 m	MPC · JPL
552214	2013 UD_{10}	—	March 16, 2004	Catalina	CSS	·	2.8 km	MPC · JPL
552215	2013 UD_{11}	—	October 3, 2013	Kitt Peak	Spacewatch	·	2.2 km	MPC · JPL
552216	2013 UO_{13}	—	December 25, 2003	Apache Point	SDSS Collaboration	·	3.8 km	MPC · JPL
552217	2013 UQ_{16}	—	October 24, 2013	Mount Lemmon	Mount Lemmon Survey	·	2.4 km	MPC · JPL
552218	2013 UP_{19}	—	October 16, 2013	Mount Lemmon	Mount Lemmon Survey	·	2.4 km	MPC · JPL
552219	2013 UL_{20}	—	October 25, 2013	Kitt Peak	Spacewatch	EOS	1.7 km	MPC · JPL
552220	2013 UC_{22}	—	December 6, 2008	Kitt Peak	Spacewatch	EOS	1.7 km	MPC · JPL
552221	2013 UK_{28}	—	December 21, 2014	Haleakala	Pan-STARRS 1	·	2.1 km	MPC · JPL
552222	2013 UC_{29}	—	October 31, 2013	Mount Lemmon	Mount Lemmon Survey	·	2.7 km	MPC · JPL
552223	2013 UL_{29}	—	March 13, 2016	Haleakala	Pan-STARRS 1	·	2.2 km	MPC · JPL
552224	2013 UZ_{31}	—	October 24, 2013	Kitt Peak	Spacewatch	·	920 m	MPC · JPL
552225	2013 UE_{32}	—	October 25, 2013	Mount Lemmon	Mount Lemmon Survey	EOS	1.5 km	MPC · JPL
552226	2013 UB_{34}	—	October 28, 2013	Mount Lemmon	Mount Lemmon Survey	L5	7.8 km	MPC · JPL
552227	2013 UG_{34}	—	October 26, 2013	Catalina	CSS	·	2.5 km	MPC · JPL
552228	2013 UW_{34}	—	October 26, 2013	Mount Lemmon	Mount Lemmon Survey	·	2.1 km	MPC · JPL
552229	2013 UY_{35}	—	October 28, 2013	Kitt Peak	Spacewatch	·	2.2 km	MPC · JPL
552230	2013 UP_{36}	—	October 24, 2013	Mount Lemmon	Mount Lemmon Survey	·	2.3 km	MPC · JPL
552231	2013 UA_{38}	—	October 24, 2013	Mount Lemmon	Mount Lemmon Survey	·	2.1 km	MPC · JPL
552232	2013 UB_{38}	—	October 27, 2013	Mount Lemmon	Mount Lemmon Survey	·	2.5 km	MPC · JPL
552233	2013 VO	—	October 3, 2002	Palomar	NEAT	·	2.7 km	MPC · JPL
552234	2013 VH_{1}	—	October 27, 2008	Mount Lemmon	Mount Lemmon Survey	EOS	1.6 km	MPC · JPL
552235	2013 VF_{3}	—	October 24, 2013	Palomar	Palomar Transient Factory	·	3.0 km	MPC · JPL
552236	2013 VU_{3}	—	October 3, 2013	Haleakala	Pan-STARRS 1	HYG	2.7 km	MPC · JPL
552237	2013 VZ_{3}	—	November 1, 2002	Palomar	NEAT	EOS	2.1 km	MPC · JPL
552238	2013 VV_{5}	—	March 10, 2005	Mount Lemmon	Mount Lemmon Survey	·	2.5 km	MPC · JPL
552239	2013 VB_{6}	—	July 13, 2013	Haleakala	Pan-STARRS 1	EOS	2.2 km	MPC · JPL
552240	2013 VE_{6}	—	May 27, 2012	Mount Lemmon	Mount Lemmon Survey	EOS	2.6 km	MPC · JPL
552241	2013 VN_{6}	—	October 26, 2013	Elena Remote	Oreshko, A.	·	2.9 km	MPC · JPL
552242	2013 VW_{6}	—	December 7, 2002	Desert Eagle	W. K. Y. Yeung	·	3.1 km	MPC · JPL
552243	2013 VY_{7}	—	September 13, 2002	Palomar	NEAT	MAS	680 m	MPC · JPL
552244	2013 VX_{8}	—	November 16, 2002	Palomar	NEAT	MAS	660 m	MPC · JPL
552245	2013 VZ_{10}	—	December 27, 2006	Mount Lemmon	Mount Lemmon Survey	·	1.2 km	MPC · JPL
552246	2013 VS_{15}	—	January 4, 2011	Mount Lemmon	Mount Lemmon Survey	·	560 m	MPC · JPL
552247	2013 VT_{15}	—	October 26, 2013	Catalina	CSS	T_{j} (2.99)	3.6 km	MPC · JPL
552248	2013 VN_{16}	—	November 22, 2006	Mount Lemmon	Mount Lemmon Survey	·	1.1 km	MPC · JPL
552249	2013 VU_{19}	—	October 15, 2002	Palomar	NEAT	NYS	1.2 km	MPC · JPL
552250	2013 VD_{20}	—	September 15, 2007	Catalina	CSS	TIR	3.2 km	MPC · JPL
552251	2013 VY_{22}	—	April 8, 2010	Palomar	Palomar Transient Factory	·	3.0 km	MPC · JPL
552252	2013 VT_{26}	—	November 8, 2013	Mount Lemmon	Mount Lemmon Survey	·	3.1 km	MPC · JPL
552253	2013 VT_{29}	—	November 9, 2013	Haleakala	Pan-STARRS 1	·	2.0 km	MPC · JPL
552254	2013 VS_{30}	—	November 12, 2013	Kitt Peak	Spacewatch	EOS	1.7 km	MPC · JPL
552255	2013 VR_{31}	—	November 12, 2013	Mount Lemmon	Mount Lemmon Survey	·	640 m	MPC · JPL
552256	2013 VJ_{33}	—	November 8, 2013	Kitt Peak	Spacewatch	·	980 m	MPC · JPL
552257	2013 VG_{43}	—	February 5, 2016	Haleakala	Pan-STARRS 1	·	3.0 km	MPC · JPL
552258	2013 VM_{44}	—	November 2, 2013	Mount Lemmon	Mount Lemmon Survey	·	2.3 km	MPC · JPL
552259	2013 VB_{48}	—	November 6, 2013	Mount Lemmon	Mount Lemmon Survey	·	2.0 km	MPC · JPL
552260	2013 VZ_{49}	—	November 2, 2013	Mount Lemmon	Mount Lemmon Survey	·	2.6 km	MPC · JPL
552261	2013 VB_{50}	—	November 9, 2013	Mount Lemmon	Mount Lemmon Survey	VER	2.4 km	MPC · JPL
552262	2013 VG_{51}	—	November 6, 2013	Haleakala	Pan-STARRS 1	·	1.9 km	MPC · JPL
552263	2013 VS_{51}	—	November 12, 2013	Kitt Peak	Spacewatch	·	2.7 km	MPC · JPL
552264	2013 VY_{51}	—	November 14, 2013	Mount Lemmon	Mount Lemmon Survey	·	460 m	MPC · JPL
552265	2013 VV_{53}	—	November 9, 2013	Haleakala	Pan-STARRS 1	HYG	2.8 km	MPC · JPL
552266	2013 VV_{54}	—	November 10, 2013	Mount Lemmon	Mount Lemmon Survey	·	2.4 km	MPC · JPL
552267	2013 VO_{55}	—	November 9, 2013	Haleakala	Pan-STARRS 1	EOS	1.7 km	MPC · JPL
552268	2013 VQ_{55}	—	November 1, 2013	Kitt Peak	Spacewatch	·	2.3 km	MPC · JPL
552269	2013 VT_{55}	—	November 9, 2013	Mount Lemmon	Mount Lemmon Survey	·	2.2 km	MPC · JPL
552270	2013 VK_{56}	—	October 14, 2013	Mount Lemmon	Mount Lemmon Survey	·	1.8 km	MPC · JPL
552271	2013 VP_{63}	—	November 10, 2013	Mount Lemmon	Mount Lemmon Survey	·	3.6 km	MPC · JPL
552272	2013 WJ	—	August 13, 2006	Palomar	NEAT	·	1.3 km	MPC · JPL
552273	2013 WJ_{2}	—	February 16, 2004	Kitt Peak	Spacewatch	·	3.0 km	MPC · JPL
552274	2013 WF_{3}	—	November 25, 2013	XuYi	PMO NEO Survey Program	·	2.0 km	MPC · JPL
552275	2013 WL_{6}	—	December 26, 2009	Kitt Peak	Spacewatch	EOS	2.4 km	MPC · JPL
552276	2013 WW_{6}	—	March 18, 2004	Palomar	NEAT	·	2.9 km	MPC · JPL
552277	2013 WL_{7}	—	December 15, 2006	Kitt Peak	Spacewatch	·	840 m	MPC · JPL
552278	2013 WY_{9}	—	October 28, 2006	Kitt Peak	Spacewatch	·	740 m	MPC · JPL
552279	2013 WZ_{14}	—	October 26, 2013	Mount Lemmon	Mount Lemmon Survey	·	2.2 km	MPC · JPL
552280	2013 WA_{18}	—	November 27, 2013	Haleakala	Pan-STARRS 1	EOS	2.0 km	MPC · JPL
552281	2013 WG_{19}	—	October 9, 2013	Mount Lemmon	Mount Lemmon Survey	·	2.6 km	MPC · JPL
552282	2013 WX_{20}	—	November 6, 2013	Haleakala	Pan-STARRS 1	·	2.4 km	MPC · JPL
552283	2013 WN_{23}	—	June 4, 2011	Mount Lemmon	Mount Lemmon Survey	EOS	1.9 km	MPC · JPL
552284	2013 WG_{25}	—	May 6, 2008	Sierra Stars	Dillon, W. G.	PHO	3.5 km	MPC · JPL
552285	2013 WF_{27}	—	May 29, 2009	Mount Lemmon	Mount Lemmon Survey	·	1.5 km	MPC · JPL
552286	2013 WU_{27}	—	October 8, 2013	Mount Lemmon	Mount Lemmon Survey	·	890 m	MPC · JPL
552287	2013 WW_{30}	—	December 19, 2003	Kitt Peak	Spacewatch	·	2.2 km	MPC · JPL
552288	2013 WQ_{31}	—	November 26, 2013	Haleakala	Pan-STARRS 1	EOS	2.2 km	MPC · JPL
552289	2013 WM_{32}	—	December 22, 2008	Kitt Peak	Spacewatch	THM	1.7 km	MPC · JPL
552290	2013 WD_{33}	—	September 12, 2013	Mount Lemmon	Mount Lemmon Survey	NYS	870 m	MPC · JPL
552291	2013 WW_{33}	—	August 26, 2012	Haleakala	Pan-STARRS 1	·	2.1 km	MPC · JPL
552292	2013 WL_{37}	—	March 15, 2004	Kitt Peak	Spacewatch	·	3.1 km	MPC · JPL
552293	2013 WL_{38}	—	November 28, 2013	Kitt Peak	Spacewatch	·	710 m	MPC · JPL
552294	2013 WQ_{38}	—	September 10, 2007	Catalina	CSS	·	2.6 km	MPC · JPL
552295	2013 WW_{38}	—	March 16, 2004	Kitt Peak	Spacewatch	·	2.9 km	MPC · JPL
552296	2013 WA_{39}	—	October 3, 2013	Mount Lemmon	Mount Lemmon Survey	·	2.3 km	MPC · JPL
552297	2013 WX_{39}	—	September 18, 2003	Kitt Peak	Spacewatch	·	750 m	MPC · JPL
552298	2013 WB_{40}	—	November 28, 2013	Mount Lemmon	Mount Lemmon Survey	EOS	1.7 km	MPC · JPL
552299	2013 WE_{43}	—	October 9, 2007	Mount Lemmon	Mount Lemmon Survey	·	2.7 km	MPC · JPL
552300	2013 WP_{45}	—	October 31, 2002	Haleakala	NEAT	·	1.3 km	MPC · JPL

== 552301–552400 ==
back to top

Designation			Discovery			Properties		Ref
Permanent	Provisional	Named after	Date	Site	Discoverer(s)	Category	Diam.	Ref
552301	2013 WZ_{45}	—	July 14, 2013	Haleakala	Pan-STARRS 1	·	3.6 km	MPC · JPL
552302	2013 WF_{48}	—	November 11, 2013	Mount Lemmon	Mount Lemmon Survey	·	2.4 km	MPC · JPL
552303	2013 WG_{50}	—	October 5, 2007	Kitt Peak	Spacewatch	·	2.2 km	MPC · JPL
552304	2013 WX_{50}	—	April 9, 2010	Mount Lemmon	Mount Lemmon Survey	·	2.7 km	MPC · JPL
552305	2013 WB_{53}	—	November 25, 2013	Haleakala	Pan-STARRS 1	EOS	1.6 km	MPC · JPL
552306	2013 WN_{53}	—	November 11, 2013	Mount Lemmon	Mount Lemmon Survey	·	2.2 km	MPC · JPL
552307	2013 WW_{53}	—	August 31, 2005	Kitt Peak	Spacewatch	·	1.5 km	MPC · JPL
552308	2013 WK_{56}	—	March 19, 2004	Palomar	NEAT	·	3.4 km	MPC · JPL
552309	2013 WF_{57}	—	November 16, 2002	Palomar	NEAT	·	2.7 km	MPC · JPL
552310	2013 WD_{58}	—	November 9, 2013	Haleakala	Pan-STARRS 1	·	1.3 km	MPC · JPL
552311	2013 WX_{58}	—	October 8, 2013	Mount Lemmon	Mount Lemmon Survey	·	2.9 km	MPC · JPL
552312	2013 WK_{59}	—	January 26, 2007	Kitt Peak	Spacewatch	NYS	1.2 km	MPC · JPL
552313	2013 WB_{60}	—	October 8, 2013	Mount Lemmon	Mount Lemmon Survey	·	490 m	MPC · JPL
552314	2013 WH_{60}	—	January 27, 2003	Palomar	NEAT	·	1.4 km	MPC · JPL
552315	2013 WE_{61}	—	September 20, 2003	Palomar	NEAT	·	670 m	MPC · JPL
552316	2013 WS_{61}	—	November 27, 2013	Haleakala	Pan-STARRS 1	·	2.2 km	MPC · JPL
552317	2013 WC_{65}	—	September 22, 2012	Mount Lemmon	Mount Lemmon Survey	EOS	1.8 km	MPC · JPL
552318	2013 WC_{68}	—	August 28, 2006	Siding Spring	SSS	·	810 m	MPC · JPL
552319	2013 WC_{69}	—	November 10, 2013	Kitt Peak	Spacewatch	·	2.5 km	MPC · JPL
552320	2013 WP_{70}	—	November 8, 2013	Mount Lemmon	Mount Lemmon Survey	EOS	1.6 km	MPC · JPL
552321	2013 WS_{70}	—	May 9, 2000	Kitt Peak	Spacewatch	·	2.3 km	MPC · JPL
552322	2013 WA_{71}	—	October 16, 2007	Mount Lemmon	Mount Lemmon Survey	·	2.9 km	MPC · JPL
552323	2013 WK_{72}	—	November 11, 2013	Oukaïmeden	M. Ory	EOS	2.1 km	MPC · JPL
552324	2013 WL_{73}	—	January 26, 2003	Haleakala	NEAT	·	1.3 km	MPC · JPL
552325	2013 WQ_{75}	—	November 26, 2013	Haleakala	Pan-STARRS 1	·	940 m	MPC · JPL
552326	2013 WT_{77}	—	December 22, 2008	Kitt Peak	Spacewatch	·	2.3 km	MPC · JPL
552327	2013 WE_{78}	—	November 7, 2013	Kitt Peak	Spacewatch	·	2.7 km	MPC · JPL
552328	2013 WP_{80}	—	January 2, 2001	Socorro	LINEAR	EUN	1.7 km	MPC · JPL
552329	2013 WD_{82}	—	May 10, 2007	Mount Lemmon	Mount Lemmon Survey	·	1.0 km	MPC · JPL
552330	2013 WT_{84}	—	September 22, 2012	Mount Lemmon	Mount Lemmon Survey	EOS	2.0 km	MPC · JPL
552331	2013 WD_{85}	—	October 6, 2008	Kitt Peak	Spacewatch	EUN	1.3 km	MPC · JPL
552332	2013 WL_{86}	—	October 27, 2013	Catalina	CSS	·	3.2 km	MPC · JPL
552333	2013 WD_{87}	—	April 7, 2005	Kitt Peak	Spacewatch	·	3.1 km	MPC · JPL
552334	2013 WN_{89}	—	November 28, 2013	Mount Lemmon	Mount Lemmon Survey	·	2.6 km	MPC · JPL
552335	2013 WE_{90}	—	August 6, 2012	Haleakala	Pan-STARRS 1	·	2.5 km	MPC · JPL
552336	2013 WO_{94}	—	October 10, 2007	Kitt Peak	Spacewatch	·	2.9 km	MPC · JPL
552337	2013 WR_{94}	—	November 28, 2013	Mount Lemmon	Mount Lemmon Survey	·	2.7 km	MPC · JPL
552338	2013 WG_{96}	—	November 17, 2007	Mount Lemmon	Mount Lemmon Survey	·	2.9 km	MPC · JPL
552339	2013 WK_{98}	—	November 20, 2003	Palomar	NEAT	·	740 m	MPC · JPL
552340	2013 WW_{99}	—	March 17, 2005	Mount Lemmon	Mount Lemmon Survey	EOS	2.2 km	MPC · JPL
552341	2013 WV_{100}	—	November 29, 2013	Mount Lemmon	Mount Lemmon Survey	V	590 m	MPC · JPL
552342	2013 WW_{102}	—	October 15, 2007	Kitt Peak	Spacewatch	EOS	1.6 km	MPC · JPL
552343	2013 WK_{104}	—	October 31, 2013	Piszkéstető	K. Sárneczky	·	2.7 km	MPC · JPL
552344	2013 WK_{105}	—	October 29, 1999	Kitt Peak	Spacewatch	·	540 m	MPC · JPL
552345	2013 WG_{107}	—	April 24, 2011	Mount Lemmon	Mount Lemmon Survey	·	3.2 km	MPC · JPL
552346	2013 WW_{109}	—	September 14, 2002	Palomar	NEAT	·	2.1 km	MPC · JPL
552347	2013 WU_{110}	—	October 26, 2013	Mount Lemmon	Mount Lemmon Survey	·	2.1 km	MPC · JPL
552348	2013 WM_{112}	—	October 10, 2007	Kitt Peak	Spacewatch	HYG	2.0 km	MPC · JPL
552349	2013 WZ_{113}	—	November 29, 2013	Haleakala	Pan-STARRS 1	·	560 m	MPC · JPL
552350	2013 WA_{114}	—	November 25, 2013	Haleakala	Pan-STARRS 1	·	1.1 km	MPC · JPL
552351	2013 WK_{115}	—	November 28, 2013	Mount Lemmon	Mount Lemmon Survey	·	2.7 km	MPC · JPL
552352	2013 WZ_{118}	—	November 27, 2013	Haleakala	Pan-STARRS 1	·	2.3 km	MPC · JPL
552353	2013 WV_{120}	—	January 16, 2015	Haleakala	Pan-STARRS 1	·	2.5 km	MPC · JPL
552354	2013 WR_{123}	—	February 4, 2017	Haleakala	Pan-STARRS 1	L5	5.9 km	MPC · JPL
552355	2013 WR_{126}	—	June 21, 2012	Kitt Peak	Spacewatch	·	2.1 km	MPC · JPL
552356	2013 WT_{126}	—	November 27, 2013	Haleakala	Pan-STARRS 1	·	490 m	MPC · JPL
552357	2013 WE_{127}	—	November 27, 2013	Haleakala	Pan-STARRS 1	·	2.7 km	MPC · JPL
552358	2013 WH_{131}	—	November 28, 2013	Mount Lemmon	Mount Lemmon Survey	·	2.2 km	MPC · JPL
552359	2013 WB_{133}	—	November 27, 2013	Haleakala	Pan-STARRS 1	·	2.1 km	MPC · JPL
552360	2013 WF_{134}	—	November 27, 2013	Haleakala	Pan-STARRS 1	·	580 m	MPC · JPL
552361	2013 XQ_{1}	—	December 3, 2013	Haleakala	Pan-STARRS 1	·	3.4 km	MPC · JPL
552362	2013 XB_{3}	—	January 14, 2004	Palomar	NEAT	·	1.2 km	MPC · JPL
552363	2013 XL_{4}	—	December 5, 2013	Haleakala	Pan-STARRS 1	H	430 m	MPC · JPL
552364	2013 XP_{6}	—	October 11, 2007	Mount Lemmon	Mount Lemmon Survey	VER	2.0 km	MPC · JPL
552365	2013 XB_{7}	—	November 2, 2007	Mount Lemmon	Mount Lemmon Survey	·	3.2 km	MPC · JPL
552366	2013 XC_{7}	—	October 19, 2007	Catalina	CSS	·	2.5 km	MPC · JPL
552367	2013 XY_{7}	—	October 4, 2006	Mount Lemmon	Mount Lemmon Survey	·	810 m	MPC · JPL
552368	2013 XK_{11}	—	September 21, 2001	Apache Point	SDSS Collaboration	PHO	860 m	MPC · JPL
552369	2013 XJ_{12}	—	February 10, 2011	Mount Lemmon	Mount Lemmon Survey	·	560 m	MPC · JPL
552370	2013 XA_{17}	—	May 23, 2006	Mount Lemmon	Mount Lemmon Survey	·	2.6 km	MPC · JPL
552371	2013 XK_{20}	—	September 21, 2009	Mount Lemmon	Mount Lemmon Survey	·	720 m	MPC · JPL
552372	2013 XV_{21}	—	January 7, 2003	Socorro	LINEAR	·	2.0 km	MPC · JPL
552373	2013 XV_{25}	—	November 14, 2006	Mount Lemmon	Mount Lemmon Survey	·	980 m	MPC · JPL
552374	2013 XC_{29}	—	December 10, 2006	Kitt Peak	Spacewatch	·	700 m	MPC · JPL
552375	2013 XF_{32}	—	December 13, 2013	Mount Lemmon	Mount Lemmon Survey	PHO	800 m	MPC · JPL
552376	2013 YB_{1}	—	November 28, 2013	Mount Lemmon	Mount Lemmon Survey	·	2.8 km	MPC · JPL
552377	2013 YS_{9}	—	December 24, 2013	Mount Lemmon	Mount Lemmon Survey	·	630 m	MPC · JPL
552378	2013 YV_{10}	—	November 17, 2009	Kitt Peak	Spacewatch	·	1.0 km	MPC · JPL
552379	2013 YA_{11}	—	December 25, 2003	Apache Point	SDSS Collaboration	PHO	700 m	MPC · JPL
552380	2013 YW_{14}	—	October 27, 2008	Kitt Peak	Spacewatch	EUN	1.2 km	MPC · JPL
552381	2013 YZ_{15}	—	February 21, 2003	Palomar	NEAT	HYG	3.6 km	MPC · JPL
552382	2013 YU_{17}	—	December 24, 2013	Mount Lemmon	Mount Lemmon Survey	·	770 m	MPC · JPL
552383	2013 YV_{17}	—	December 24, 2013	Mount Lemmon	Mount Lemmon Survey	·	560 m	MPC · JPL
552384	2013 YD_{18}	—	February 11, 2011	Mount Lemmon	Mount Lemmon Survey	·	620 m	MPC · JPL
552385 Rochechouart	2013 YU_{18}	Rochechouart	October 17, 2007	Mount Lemmon	Mount Lemmon Survey	EOS	2.4 km	MPC · JPL
552386	2013 YG_{19}	—	November 28, 2013	Mount Lemmon	Mount Lemmon Survey	·	2.7 km	MPC · JPL
552387	2013 YF_{20}	—	December 25, 2013	Haleakala	Pan-STARRS 1	H	630 m	MPC · JPL
552388	2013 YT_{20}	—	December 4, 2013	Haleakala	Pan-STARRS 1	H	450 m	MPC · JPL
552389	2013 YK_{22}	—	November 20, 2008	Kitt Peak	Spacewatch	·	2.7 km	MPC · JPL
552390	2013 YS_{28}	—	April 9, 2010	Catalina	CSS	TIR	3.3 km	MPC · JPL
552391	2013 YB_{29}	—	January 18, 2004	Palomar	NEAT	·	810 m	MPC · JPL
552392	2013 YU_{32}	—	November 12, 2007	Catalina	CSS	·	3.3 km	MPC · JPL
552393	2013 YO_{33}	—	December 26, 2013	Mount Lemmon	Mount Lemmon Survey	LUT	3.2 km	MPC · JPL
552394	2013 YP_{38}	—	November 2, 2013	Kitt Peak	Spacewatch	·	3.4 km	MPC · JPL
552395	2013 YF_{39}	—	October 8, 2007	Mount Lemmon	Mount Lemmon Survey	·	2.9 km	MPC · JPL
552396	2013 YQ_{40}	—	November 27, 2013	Haleakala	Pan-STARRS 1	·	2.7 km	MPC · JPL
552397	2013 YX_{40}	—	March 29, 2008	Kitt Peak	Spacewatch	·	690 m	MPC · JPL
552398	2013 YW_{41}	—	November 28, 2013	Mount Lemmon	Mount Lemmon Survey	·	2.4 km	MPC · JPL
552399	2013 YA_{43}	—	November 17, 2006	Kitt Peak	Spacewatch	·	840 m	MPC · JPL
552400	2013 YH_{49}	—	April 13, 2011	Mount Lemmon	Mount Lemmon Survey	·	530 m	MPC · JPL

== 552401–552500 ==
back to top

Designation			Discovery			Properties		Ref
Permanent	Provisional	Named after	Date	Site	Discoverer(s)	Category	Diam.	Ref
552401	2013 YE_{52}	—	October 9, 2007	Kitt Peak	Spacewatch	HYG	2.1 km	MPC · JPL
552402	2013 YG_{52}	—	May 7, 2002	Palomar	NEAT	·	760 m	MPC · JPL
552403	2013 YO_{53}	—	October 9, 2007	Kitt Peak	Spacewatch	HYG	2.3 km	MPC · JPL
552404	2013 YS_{56}	—	November 29, 2013	Mount Lemmon	Mount Lemmon Survey	·	1.2 km	MPC · JPL
552405	2013 YG_{59}	—	December 5, 2007	Mount Lemmon	Mount Lemmon Survey	·	3.8 km	MPC · JPL
552406	2013 YQ_{60}	—	March 31, 2008	Kitt Peak	Spacewatch	·	530 m	MPC · JPL
552407	2013 YX_{61}	—	December 10, 2013	Mount Lemmon	Mount Lemmon Survey	·	650 m	MPC · JPL
552408	2013 YB_{63}	—	October 12, 2006	Palomar	NEAT	·	890 m	MPC · JPL
552409	2013 YC_{63}	—	February 22, 2003	Kleť	J. Tichá, M. Tichý	·	3.3 km	MPC · JPL
552410	2013 YL_{63}	—	January 10, 2008	Mount Lemmon	Mount Lemmon Survey	·	3.8 km	MPC · JPL
552411	2013 YO_{66}	—	November 2, 2000	Kitt Peak	Spacewatch	·	610 m	MPC · JPL
552412	2013 YU_{66}	—	November 10, 2013	Kitt Peak	Spacewatch	·	2.2 km	MPC · JPL
552413	2013 YB_{68}	—	December 30, 2013	Mount Lemmon	Mount Lemmon Survey	·	600 m	MPC · JPL
552414	2013 YJ_{68}	—	August 13, 2002	Palomar	NEAT	EUN	1.2 km	MPC · JPL
552415	2013 YW_{70}	—	December 4, 2013	Haleakala	Pan-STARRS 1	PHO	990 m	MPC · JPL
552416	2013 YJ_{71}	—	November 27, 2013	Haleakala	Pan-STARRS 1	·	2.7 km	MPC · JPL
552417	2013 YO_{74}	—	June 11, 2005	Catalina	CSS	·	3.2 km	MPC · JPL
552418	2013 YU_{81}	—	April 19, 2007	Kitt Peak	Spacewatch	·	900 m	MPC · JPL
552419	2013 YC_{82}	—	August 15, 2002	Kitt Peak	Spacewatch	·	630 m	MPC · JPL
552420 Flodubeyjames	2013 YG_{82}	Flodubeyjames	December 28, 2013	Mayhill	Falla, N.	·	2.6 km	MPC · JPL
552421	2013 YV_{87}	—	November 17, 2009	Mount Lemmon	Mount Lemmon Survey	·	700 m	MPC · JPL
552422	2013 YV_{95}	—	December 30, 2013	Kitt Peak	Spacewatch	·	1.1 km	MPC · JPL
552423	2013 YH_{96}	—	March 16, 2004	Siding Spring	SSS	·	810 m	MPC · JPL
552424	2013 YU_{98}	—	December 30, 2005	Mount Lemmon	Mount Lemmon Survey	·	1.3 km	MPC · JPL
552425	2013 YK_{100}	—	December 31, 2013	Mount Lemmon	Mount Lemmon Survey	·	650 m	MPC · JPL
552426	2013 YJ_{107}	—	December 20, 2006	Palomar	NEAT	PHO	1.2 km	MPC · JPL
552427	2013 YN_{112}	—	December 30, 2013	Kitt Peak	Spacewatch	·	3.2 km	MPC · JPL
552428	2013 YO_{113}	—	November 8, 2009	Mount Lemmon	Mount Lemmon Survey	·	680 m	MPC · JPL
552429	2013 YY_{113}	—	September 17, 2006	Kitt Peak	Spacewatch	·	2.7 km	MPC · JPL
552430	2013 YA_{114}	—	December 30, 2013	Kitt Peak	Spacewatch	·	2.9 km	MPC · JPL
552431	2013 YC_{114}	—	December 4, 2007	Kitt Peak	Spacewatch	·	3.0 km	MPC · JPL
552432	2013 YW_{114}	—	February 2, 2006	Kitt Peak	Spacewatch	ADE	2.3 km	MPC · JPL
552433	2013 YD_{123}	—	February 9, 2011	Mount Lemmon	Mount Lemmon Survey	·	1.0 km	MPC · JPL
552434	2013 YH_{126}	—	May 15, 2012	Haleakala	Pan-STARRS 1	·	1.2 km	MPC · JPL
552435	2013 YD_{130}	—	February 20, 2009	Mount Lemmon	Mount Lemmon Survey	VER	2.2 km	MPC · JPL
552436	2013 YK_{130}	—	December 11, 2001	Socorro	LINEAR	·	4.5 km	MPC · JPL
552437	2013 YK_{131}	—	September 26, 2006	Kitt Peak	Spacewatch	·	540 m	MPC · JPL
552438	2013 YY_{138}	—	October 11, 2007	Kitt Peak	Spacewatch	·	2.5 km	MPC · JPL
552439	2013 YE_{141}	—	December 31, 2013	Mount Lemmon	Mount Lemmon Survey	·	2.9 km	MPC · JPL
552440	2013 YQ_{142}	—	December 31, 2013	Mount Lemmon	Mount Lemmon Survey	·	890 m	MPC · JPL
552441	2013 YQ_{146}	—	February 23, 2011	Kitt Peak	Spacewatch	·	560 m	MPC · JPL
552442	2013 YT_{147}	—	June 16, 2012	Haleakala	Pan-STARRS 1	PHO	1.1 km	MPC · JPL
552443	2013 YV_{147}	—	September 29, 2009	Mount Lemmon	Mount Lemmon Survey	V	710 m	MPC · JPL
552444	2013 YX_{147}	—	April 2, 2011	Mount Lemmon	Mount Lemmon Survey	·	630 m	MPC · JPL
552445	2013 YE_{150}	—	December 23, 2013	Catalina	CSS	·	2.7 km	MPC · JPL
552446	2013 YJ_{150}	—	December 31, 2002	Anderson Mesa	LONEOS	T_{j} (2.96)	3.7 km	MPC · JPL
552447	2013 YE_{153}	—	March 29, 2011	Mount Lemmon	Mount Lemmon Survey	(2076)	620 m	MPC · JPL
552448	2013 YF_{155}	—	January 8, 2011	Mount Lemmon	Mount Lemmon Survey	·	540 m	MPC · JPL
552449	2013 YB_{159}	—	February 17, 2015	Haleakala	Pan-STARRS 1	·	2.8 km	MPC · JPL
552450	2013 YE_{162}	—	December 28, 2013	Mount Lemmon	Mount Lemmon Survey	·	2.5 km	MPC · JPL
552451	2010 AH_{4}	—	January 4, 2010	Kitt Peak	Spacewatch	HOF	2.0 km	MPC · JPL
552452	2010 AZ_{5}	—	November 21, 2009	Kitt Peak	Spacewatch	·	680 m	MPC · JPL
552453	2010 AR_{7}	—	January 6, 2010	Kitt Peak	Spacewatch	·	750 m	MPC · JPL
552454	2010 AM_{9}	—	September 4, 2008	Kitt Peak	Spacewatch	·	690 m	MPC · JPL
552455	2010 AU_{9}	—	November 16, 2009	Mount Lemmon	Mount Lemmon Survey	·	2.7 km	MPC · JPL
552456	2010 AE_{12}	—	January 6, 2010	Kitt Peak	Spacewatch	V	520 m	MPC · JPL
552457	2010 AE_{16}	—	January 7, 2010	Mount Lemmon	Mount Lemmon Survey	·	1.6 km	MPC · JPL
552458	2010 AF_{19}	—	January 7, 2010	Mount Lemmon	Mount Lemmon Survey	KOR	1.4 km	MPC · JPL
552459	2010 AN_{30}	—	January 4, 2010	Kitt Peak	Spacewatch	·	1.1 km	MPC · JPL
552460	2010 AA_{32}	—	September 24, 2008	Kitt Peak	Spacewatch	·	2.0 km	MPC · JPL
552461	2010 AP_{32}	—	January 6, 2010	Kitt Peak	Spacewatch	·	780 m	MPC · JPL
552462	2010 AA_{36}	—	January 7, 2010	Kitt Peak	Spacewatch	·	790 m	MPC · JPL
552463	2010 AW_{36}	—	January 7, 2010	Kitt Peak	Spacewatch	·	2.5 km	MPC · JPL
552464	2010 AS_{42}	—	November 10, 2004	Kitt Peak	Spacewatch	·	1.9 km	MPC · JPL
552465	2010 AG_{48}	—	January 8, 2010	Kitt Peak	Spacewatch	·	540 m	MPC · JPL
552466	2010 AF_{49}	—	September 23, 2008	Kitt Peak	Spacewatch	(16286)	2.2 km	MPC · JPL
552467	2010 AR_{54}	—	January 8, 2010	Kitt Peak	Spacewatch	·	2.0 km	MPC · JPL
552468	2010 AT_{57}	—	December 26, 2009	Kitt Peak	Spacewatch	·	1.8 km	MPC · JPL
552469	2010 AF_{68}	—	November 10, 2009	Kitt Peak	Spacewatch	·	600 m	MPC · JPL
552470	2010 AK_{72}	—	September 3, 2008	Kitt Peak	Spacewatch	V	620 m	MPC · JPL
552471	2010 AF_{142}	—	January 6, 2010	Mount Lemmon	Mount Lemmon Survey	·	750 m	MPC · JPL
552472	2010 AY_{146}	—	February 8, 2011	Mount Lemmon	Mount Lemmon Survey	·	1.5 km	MPC · JPL
552473	2010 AV_{150}	—	October 1, 2009	Mount Lemmon	Mount Lemmon Survey	·	1.9 km	MPC · JPL
552474	2010 AW_{153}	—	January 8, 2010	Haleakala	Pan-STARRS 1	centaur	80 km	MPC · JPL
552475	2010 AC_{154}	—	October 26, 2008	Mount Lemmon	Mount Lemmon Survey	·	960 m	MPC · JPL
552476	2010 AN_{155}	—	January 25, 2015	Haleakala	Pan-STARRS 1	·	1.7 km	MPC · JPL
552477	2010 AV_{155}	—	March 28, 2014	Mount Lemmon	Mount Lemmon Survey	·	540 m	MPC · JPL
552478	2010 AD_{156}	—	August 21, 2015	Haleakala	Pan-STARRS 1	·	620 m	MPC · JPL
552479	2010 AG_{156}	—	January 8, 2010	Mount Lemmon	Mount Lemmon Survey	·	660 m	MPC · JPL
552480	2010 AT_{156}	—	April 22, 2011	Kitt Peak	Spacewatch	·	1.9 km	MPC · JPL
552481	2010 AU_{156}	—	January 7, 2010	Mount Lemmon	Mount Lemmon Survey	·	530 m	MPC · JPL
552482	2010 AV_{160}	—	January 10, 2010	Kitt Peak	Spacewatch	·	770 m	MPC · JPL
552483	2010 AX_{160}	—	October 2, 2013	Haleakala	Pan-STARRS 1	HOF	2.4 km	MPC · JPL
552484	2010 AL_{161}	—	January 11, 2010	Kitt Peak	Spacewatch	·	1.2 km	MPC · JPL
552485	2010 AG_{163}	—	January 12, 2010	Catalina	CSS	·	2.2 km	MPC · JPL
552486	2010 BV_{131}	—	January 15, 2015	Haleakala	Pan-STARRS 1	·	1.9 km	MPC · JPL
552487	2010 CS_{21}	—	January 11, 2010	Kitt Peak	Spacewatch	·	1.3 km	MPC · JPL
552488	2010 CV_{21}	—	September 16, 2003	Kitt Peak	Spacewatch	·	1.7 km	MPC · JPL
552489	2010 CN_{23}	—	August 30, 2005	Kitt Peak	Spacewatch	·	730 m	MPC · JPL
552490	2010 CW_{26}	—	October 26, 2009	Kitt Peak	Spacewatch	·	680 m	MPC · JPL
552491	2010 CS_{27}	—	January 16, 2005	Kitt Peak	Spacewatch	·	1.6 km	MPC · JPL
552492	2010 CW_{28}	—	February 9, 2010	Kitt Peak	Spacewatch	·	800 m	MPC · JPL
552493	2010 CZ_{43}	—	February 13, 2010	Calvin-Rehoboth	L. A. Molnar	·	2.5 km	MPC · JPL
552494	2010 CW_{58}	—	February 13, 2010	Mount Lemmon	Mount Lemmon Survey	THB	2.2 km	MPC · JPL
552495	2010 CA_{61}	—	December 19, 2009	Kitt Peak	Spacewatch	·	610 m	MPC · JPL
552496	2010 CR_{71}	—	February 13, 2010	Mount Lemmon	Mount Lemmon Survey	V	470 m	MPC · JPL
552497	2010 CW_{73}	—	November 21, 2005	Catalina	CSS	·	780 m	MPC · JPL
552498	2010 CB_{78}	—	February 13, 2010	Mount Lemmon	Mount Lemmon Survey	·	800 m	MPC · JPL
552499	2010 CG_{78}	—	February 13, 2010	Mount Lemmon	Mount Lemmon Survey	·	960 m	MPC · JPL
552500	2010 CJ_{83}	—	September 5, 2008	Kitt Peak	Spacewatch	·	670 m	MPC · JPL

== 552501–552600 ==
back to top

Designation			Discovery			Properties		Ref
Permanent	Provisional	Named after	Date	Site	Discoverer(s)	Category	Diam.	Ref
552501	2010 CP_{84}	—	January 10, 2000	Kitt Peak	Spacewatch	KOR	1.6 km	MPC · JPL
552502	2010 CA_{86}	—	January 11, 2010	Mount Lemmon	Mount Lemmon Survey	·	2.7 km	MPC · JPL
552503	2010 CQ_{87}	—	February 14, 2010	Mount Lemmon	Mount Lemmon Survey	·	1.5 km	MPC · JPL
552504	2010 CV_{89}	—	February 14, 2010	Mount Lemmon	Mount Lemmon Survey	EOS	1.5 km	MPC · JPL
552505	2010 CA_{91}	—	March 17, 2005	Mount Lemmon	Mount Lemmon Survey	·	1.3 km	MPC · JPL
552506	2010 CQ_{91}	—	February 14, 2010	Mount Lemmon	Mount Lemmon Survey	·	1.5 km	MPC · JPL
552507	2010 CO_{93}	—	September 13, 2007	Mount Lemmon	Mount Lemmon Survey	KOR	1.5 km	MPC · JPL
552508	2010 CT_{98}	—	February 14, 2010	Mount Lemmon	Mount Lemmon Survey	·	320 m	MPC · JPL
552509	2010 CP_{102}	—	February 14, 2010	Mount Lemmon	Mount Lemmon Survey	·	1.3 km	MPC · JPL
552510	2010 CU_{104}	—	April 25, 2007	Kitt Peak	Spacewatch	·	560 m	MPC · JPL
552511	2010 CV_{104}	—	February 14, 2010	Mount Lemmon	Mount Lemmon Survey	EOS	1.4 km	MPC · JPL
552512	2010 CK_{105}	—	February 14, 2010	Mount Lemmon	Mount Lemmon Survey	·	1.4 km	MPC · JPL
552513	2010 CO_{105}	—	February 14, 2010	Mount Lemmon	Mount Lemmon Survey	·	1.6 km	MPC · JPL
552514	2010 CT_{108}	—	February 14, 2010	Mount Lemmon	Mount Lemmon Survey	·	1.8 km	MPC · JPL
552515	2010 CP_{109}	—	October 6, 2008	Mount Lemmon	Mount Lemmon Survey	·	2.1 km	MPC · JPL
552516	2010 CK_{113}	—	February 14, 2010	Mount Lemmon	Mount Lemmon Survey	·	680 m	MPC · JPL
552517	2010 CK_{114}	—	February 14, 2010	Mount Lemmon	Mount Lemmon Survey	V	580 m	MPC · JPL
552518	2010 CO_{115}	—	February 14, 2010	Mount Lemmon	Mount Lemmon Survey	·	640 m	MPC · JPL
552519	2010 CL_{119}	—	March 16, 2005	Mount Lemmon	Mount Lemmon Survey	KOR	1.4 km	MPC · JPL
552520	2010 CX_{126}	—	February 15, 2010	Mount Lemmon	Mount Lemmon Survey	·	1.3 km	MPC · JPL
552521	2010 CE_{153}	—	January 30, 2003	Kitt Peak	Spacewatch	·	670 m	MPC · JPL
552522	2010 CA_{158}	—	August 10, 2007	Kitt Peak	Spacewatch	·	1.9 km	MPC · JPL
552523	2010 CX_{161}	—	September 6, 2008	Kitt Peak	Spacewatch	·	700 m	MPC · JPL
552524	2010 CG_{166}	—	October 24, 2003	Apache Point	SDSS	·	2.0 km	MPC · JPL
552525	2010 CZ_{170}	—	February 13, 2010	Kitt Peak	Spacewatch	·	770 m	MPC · JPL
552526	2010 CB_{172}	—	February 15, 2010	Kitt Peak	Spacewatch	·	730 m	MPC · JPL
552527	2010 CQ_{172}	—	December 20, 2009	Kitt Peak	Spacewatch	·	1.9 km	MPC · JPL
552528	2010 CF_{178}	—	February 13, 2010	Mount Lemmon	Mount Lemmon Survey	·	610 m	MPC · JPL
552529	2010 CL_{258}	—	November 9, 2009	Mount Lemmon	Mount Lemmon Survey	·	1.9 km	MPC · JPL
552530	2010 CQ_{269}	—	December 19, 2004	Mount Lemmon	Mount Lemmon Survey	·	2.8 km	MPC · JPL
552531	2010 CG_{270}	—	December 26, 2013	Mount Lemmon	Mount Lemmon Survey	·	1.6 km	MPC · JPL
552532	2010 CW_{270}	—	February 15, 2010	Kitt Peak	Spacewatch	·	810 m	MPC · JPL
552533	2010 CP_{272}	—	January 20, 2015	Haleakala	Pan-STARRS 1	EOS	1.4 km	MPC · JPL
552534	2010 CP_{273}	—	February 15, 2010	Mount Lemmon	Mount Lemmon Survey	PHO	690 m	MPC · JPL
552535	2010 DK_{2}	—	February 16, 2010	Mount Lemmon	Mount Lemmon Survey	·	1.3 km	MPC · JPL
552536	2010 DQ_{2}	—	December 18, 2009	Mount Lemmon	Mount Lemmon Survey	·	590 m	MPC · JPL
552537	2010 DP_{7}	—	February 16, 2010	Mount Lemmon	Mount Lemmon Survey	·	1.7 km	MPC · JPL
552538	2010 DA_{8}	—	February 16, 2010	Kitt Peak	Spacewatch	·	2.6 km	MPC · JPL
552539	2010 DL_{10}	—	February 16, 2010	Mount Lemmon	Mount Lemmon Survey	·	1.8 km	MPC · JPL
552540	2010 DY_{47}	—	February 17, 2010	Mount Lemmon	Mount Lemmon Survey	GEF	1.3 km	MPC · JPL
552541	2010 DD_{49}	—	February 9, 2010	Kitt Peak	Spacewatch	·	1.8 km	MPC · JPL
552542	2010 DQ_{91}	—	February 13, 2010	Mount Lemmon	Mount Lemmon Survey	·	1.6 km	MPC · JPL
552543	2010 DJ_{102}	—	February 20, 2009	Kitt Peak	Spacewatch	·	3.2 km	MPC · JPL
552544	2010 DF_{107}	—	August 12, 2012	Catalina	CSS	·	1.9 km	MPC · JPL
552545	2010 DH_{110}	—	July 28, 2011	Haleakala	Pan-STARRS 1	V	380 m	MPC · JPL
552546	2010 DX_{110}	—	February 17, 2010	Kitt Peak	Spacewatch	·	590 m	MPC · JPL
552547	2010 DY_{111}	—	February 16, 2010	Mount Lemmon	Mount Lemmon Survey	·	700 m	MPC · JPL
552548	2010 DG_{113}	—	February 16, 2010	Kitt Peak	Spacewatch	THM	1.6 km	MPC · JPL
552549	2010 EO_{29}	—	April 2, 2005	Mount Lemmon	Mount Lemmon Survey	·	2.1 km	MPC · JPL
552550	2010 EX_{32}	—	February 17, 2010	Kitt Peak	Spacewatch	·	800 m	MPC · JPL
552551	2010 EK_{36}	—	November 30, 2003	Kitt Peak	Spacewatch	·	1.6 km	MPC · JPL
552552	2010 EF_{40}	—	July 16, 2004	Cerro Tololo	Deep Ecliptic Survey	·	1.1 km	MPC · JPL
552553	2010 EC_{41}	—	February 15, 2010	Kitt Peak	Spacewatch	H	400 m	MPC · JPL
552554	2010 EU_{41}	—	October 9, 2007	Dauban	Kugel, C. R. F.	·	2.2 km	MPC · JPL
552555	2010 ER_{65}	—	March 10, 2010	La Silla	D. L. Rabinowitz, S. Tourtellotte	SDO	346 km	MPC · JPL
552556	2010 EK_{66}	—	March 10, 2010	Moletai	K. Černis, Zdanavicius, J.	EOS	1.3 km	MPC · JPL
552557	2010 EK_{73}	—	April 26, 2003	Kitt Peak	Spacewatch	·	1.0 km	MPC · JPL
552558	2010 EA_{83}	—	March 12, 2010	Mount Lemmon	Mount Lemmon Survey	EOS	1.5 km	MPC · JPL
552559	2010 EC_{83}	—	August 23, 2007	Kitt Peak	Spacewatch	·	2.0 km	MPC · JPL
552560	2010 ED_{83}	—	March 23, 2003	Kitt Peak	Spacewatch	·	900 m	MPC · JPL
552561	2010 EH_{83}	—	March 12, 2010	Mount Lemmon	Mount Lemmon Survey	·	810 m	MPC · JPL
552562	2010 EJ_{86}	—	August 23, 2007	Kitt Peak	Spacewatch	NYS	860 m	MPC · JPL
552563	2010 EM_{92}	—	March 14, 2010	Mount Lemmon	Mount Lemmon Survey	EOS	1.7 km	MPC · JPL
552564	2010 EF_{93}	—	March 14, 2010	Mount Lemmon	Mount Lemmon Survey	·	660 m	MPC · JPL
552565	2010 EV_{93}	—	March 14, 2010	Mount Lemmon	Mount Lemmon Survey	·	760 m	MPC · JPL
552566	2010 EM_{94}	—	November 22, 2008	Kitt Peak	Spacewatch	KOR	1.9 km	MPC · JPL
552567	2010 EL_{95}	—	March 8, 2005	Mount Lemmon	Mount Lemmon Survey	EOS	1.7 km	MPC · JPL
552568	2010 ED_{96}	—	March 14, 2010	Mount Lemmon	Mount Lemmon Survey	·	1.7 km	MPC · JPL
552569	2010 ED_{97}	—	February 15, 2010	Kitt Peak	Spacewatch	·	1.5 km	MPC · JPL
552570	2010 EF_{101}	—	March 15, 2010	Kitt Peak	Spacewatch	·	820 m	MPC · JPL
552571	2010 EE_{103}	—	March 15, 2010	Mount Lemmon	Mount Lemmon Survey	KOR	1.5 km	MPC · JPL
552572	2010 ED_{108}	—	March 26, 2003	Kitt Peak	Spacewatch	·	830 m	MPC · JPL
552573	2010 EP_{108}	—	March 14, 2010	Mount Lemmon	Mount Lemmon Survey	(2076)	970 m	MPC · JPL
552574	2010 EQ_{131}	—	March 15, 2010	Kitt Peak	Spacewatch	THM	1.8 km	MPC · JPL
552575	2010 EV_{131}	—	March 15, 2010	Kitt Peak	Spacewatch	·	2.5 km	MPC · JPL
552576	2010 EM_{135}	—	March 13, 2010	Kitt Peak	Spacewatch	·	2.3 km	MPC · JPL
552577	2010 EX_{176}	—	December 17, 2009	Mount Lemmon	Mount Lemmon Survey	·	1.5 km	MPC · JPL
552578	2010 EG_{186}	—	July 21, 2013	Haleakala	Pan-STARRS 1	·	2.0 km	MPC · JPL
552579	2010 EX_{187}	—	September 20, 2006	Kitt Peak	Spacewatch	·	2.1 km	MPC · JPL
552580	2010 EA_{188}	—	March 12, 2010	Kitt Peak	Spacewatch	MAS	520 m	MPC · JPL
552581	2010 EN_{189}	—	October 3, 2013	Mount Lemmon	Mount Lemmon Survey	·	2.0 km	MPC · JPL
552582	2010 FP_{1}	—	April 26, 2006	Kitt Peak	Spacewatch	·	1.4 km	MPC · JPL
552583	2010 FN_{5}	—	September 6, 2008	Catalina	CSS	·	1.2 km	MPC · JPL
552584	2010 FH_{10}	—	March 18, 2010	Mount Lemmon	Mount Lemmon Survey	·	1.5 km	MPC · JPL
552585	2010 FN_{11}	—	March 26, 2003	Kitt Peak	Spacewatch	·	890 m	MPC · JPL
552586	2010 FL_{16}	—	March 18, 2010	Mount Lemmon	Mount Lemmon Survey	·	1.7 km	MPC · JPL
552587	2010 FG_{18}	—	February 18, 2010	Mount Lemmon	Mount Lemmon Survey	EOS	1.6 km	MPC · JPL
552588	2010 FC_{21}	—	March 18, 2010	Mount Lemmon	Mount Lemmon Survey	·	740 m	MPC · JPL
552589	2010 FD_{23}	—	March 18, 2010	Kitt Peak	Spacewatch	·	2.0 km	MPC · JPL
552590	2010 FG_{23}	—	March 18, 2010	Mount Lemmon	Mount Lemmon Survey	·	2.0 km	MPC · JPL
552591	2010 FN_{27}	—	March 20, 2010	Mount Lemmon	Mount Lemmon Survey	EOS	1.7 km	MPC · JPL
552592	2010 FJ_{30}	—	January 30, 2006	Kitt Peak	Spacewatch	·	780 m	MPC · JPL
552593	2010 FG_{31}	—	March 16, 2010	Mount Lemmon	Mount Lemmon Survey	NYS	910 m	MPC · JPL
552594	2010 FD_{55}	—	March 21, 2010	Kitt Peak	Spacewatch	·	2.5 km	MPC · JPL
552595	2010 FJ_{55}	—	September 29, 2008	Mount Lemmon	Mount Lemmon Survey	V	660 m	MPC · JPL
552596	2010 FM_{56}	—	March 23, 2010	Mount Lemmon	Mount Lemmon Survey	EOS	2.1 km	MPC · JPL
552597	2010 FC_{83}	—	March 19, 2010	Kitt Peak	Spacewatch	·	830 m	MPC · JPL
552598	2010 FO_{89}	—	April 29, 2003	Kitt Peak	Spacewatch	·	950 m	MPC · JPL
552599	2010 FE_{91}	—	March 25, 2010	Kitt Peak	Spacewatch	(2076)	800 m	MPC · JPL
552600	2010 FZ_{96}	—	March 26, 2010	Kitt Peak	Spacewatch	·	1.7 km	MPC · JPL

== 552601–552700 ==
back to top

Designation			Discovery			Properties		Ref
Permanent	Provisional	Named after	Date	Site	Discoverer(s)	Category	Diam.	Ref
552601	2010 FE_{100}	—	August 18, 2007	Anderson Mesa	LONEOS	MAS	620 m	MPC · JPL
552602	2010 FD_{130}	—	December 16, 2007	Mount Lemmon	Mount Lemmon Survey	·	3.7 km	MPC · JPL
552603	2010 FC_{135}	—	October 9, 2012	Mount Lemmon	Mount Lemmon Survey	·	640 m	MPC · JPL
552604	2010 FF_{138}	—	August 26, 2012	Haleakala	Pan-STARRS 1	·	2.0 km	MPC · JPL
552605	2010 FH_{138}	—	September 15, 2013	Mount Lemmon	Mount Lemmon Survey	·	2.5 km	MPC · JPL
552606	2010 FZ_{138}	—	September 25, 2006	Kitt Peak	Spacewatch	·	2.0 km	MPC · JPL
552607	2010 FL_{139}	—	March 18, 2010	Kitt Peak	Spacewatch	·	760 m	MPC · JPL
552608	2010 GG_{34}	—	April 8, 2010	Kitt Peak	Spacewatch	·	950 m	MPC · JPL
552609	2010 GH_{98}	—	March 20, 2010	Kitt Peak	Spacewatch	MAS	630 m	MPC · JPL
552610	2010 GM_{99}	—	April 4, 2010	Kitt Peak	Spacewatch	·	1.8 km	MPC · JPL
552611	2010 GX_{102}	—	October 18, 2007	Kitt Peak	Spacewatch	·	2.6 km	MPC · JPL
552612	2010 GR_{105}	—	November 19, 2008	Mount Lemmon	Mount Lemmon Survey	·	1.0 km	MPC · JPL
552613	2010 GU_{107}	—	October 20, 2006	Kitt Peak	Spacewatch	·	1.9 km	MPC · JPL
552614	2010 GW_{108}	—	March 25, 2010	Kitt Peak	Spacewatch	·	1.9 km	MPC · JPL
552615	2010 GH_{112}	—	August 24, 2001	Kitt Peak	Spacewatch	·	2.6 km	MPC · JPL
552616	2010 GH_{117}	—	April 10, 2010	Kitt Peak	Spacewatch	·	2.3 km	MPC · JPL
552617	2010 GD_{119}	—	October 12, 2007	Mount Lemmon	Mount Lemmon Survey	·	2.2 km	MPC · JPL
552618	2010 GE_{121}	—	December 21, 2008	Mount Lemmon	Mount Lemmon Survey	THM	1.8 km	MPC · JPL
552619	2010 GK_{121}	—	October 14, 2007	Mount Lemmon	Mount Lemmon Survey	·	2.6 km	MPC · JPL
552620	2010 GP_{121}	—	April 26, 2003	Kitt Peak	Spacewatch	·	820 m	MPC · JPL
552621	2010 GT_{121}	—	September 18, 2007	Mount Lemmon	Mount Lemmon Survey	·	1.1 km	MPC · JPL
552622	2010 GR_{127}	—	April 10, 2010	Mount Lemmon	Mount Lemmon Survey	·	2.5 km	MPC · JPL
552623	2010 GK_{129}	—	January 9, 2006	Kitt Peak	Spacewatch	·	670 m	MPC · JPL
552624	2010 GM_{130}	—	October 7, 2007	Mount Lemmon	Mount Lemmon Survey	THM	2.4 km	MPC · JPL
552625	2010 GL_{133}	—	April 11, 2010	Mount Lemmon	Mount Lemmon Survey	·	670 m	MPC · JPL
552626	2010 GC_{134}	—	March 25, 2010	Mount Lemmon	Mount Lemmon Survey	NYS	910 m	MPC · JPL
552627	2010 GM_{134}	—	April 14, 2010	Mount Lemmon	Mount Lemmon Survey	·	2.2 km	MPC · JPL
552628	2010 GA_{135}	—	August 20, 2000	Kitt Peak	Spacewatch	NYS	670 m	MPC · JPL
552629	2010 GS_{137}	—	April 5, 2010	Mount Lemmon	Mount Lemmon Survey	·	2.1 km	MPC · JPL
552630	2010 GH_{138}	—	April 6, 2010	Mount Lemmon	Mount Lemmon Survey	·	820 m	MPC · JPL
552631	2010 GB_{141}	—	March 18, 2010	Kitt Peak	Spacewatch	EUP	3.3 km	MPC · JPL
552632	2010 GK_{144}	—	April 11, 2010	Mount Lemmon	Mount Lemmon Survey	·	2.0 km	MPC · JPL
552633	2010 GY_{146}	—	April 14, 2010	Mount Lemmon	Mount Lemmon Survey	EOS	1.6 km	MPC · JPL
552634	2010 GX_{176}	—	August 25, 2000	Cerro Tololo	Deep Ecliptic Survey	·	2.4 km	MPC · JPL
552635	2010 GS_{186}	—	January 10, 2008	Kitt Peak	Spacewatch	·	2.6 km	MPC · JPL
552636	2010 GX_{186}	—	October 28, 2008	Kitt Peak	Spacewatch	·	2.5 km	MPC · JPL
552637	2010 GM_{189}	—	September 18, 2003	Palomar	NEAT	PAD	1.8 km	MPC · JPL
552638	2010 GK_{194}	—	March 28, 2015	Haleakala	Pan-STARRS 1	·	2.4 km	MPC · JPL
552639	2010 GR_{198}	—	October 17, 2011	Vallemare Borbona	V. S. Casulli	V	660 m	MPC · JPL
552640	2010 GR_{199}	—	August 19, 2001	Cerro Tololo	Deep Ecliptic Survey	EOS	1.7 km	MPC · JPL
552641	2010 GW_{199}	—	February 16, 2015	Haleakala	Pan-STARRS 1	·	2.5 km	MPC · JPL
552642	2010 GH_{200}	—	October 17, 2012	Haleakala	Pan-STARRS 1	·	2.5 km	MPC · JPL
552643	2010 GM_{200}	—	August 21, 2006	Kitt Peak	Spacewatch	·	1.6 km	MPC · JPL
552644	2010 GN_{202}	—	October 17, 2011	Kitt Peak	Spacewatch	H	440 m	MPC · JPL
552645	2010 GW_{202}	—	August 12, 2012	Haleakala	Pan-STARRS 1	EOS	1.4 km	MPC · JPL
552646	2010 GH_{205}	—	August 27, 2011	Haleakala	Pan-STARRS 1	·	1.0 km	MPC · JPL
552647	2010 GS_{205}	—	January 15, 2015	Haleakala	Pan-STARRS 1	·	2.4 km	MPC · JPL
552648	2010 GW_{206}	—	April 9, 2010	Mount Lemmon	Mount Lemmon Survey	·	2.5 km	MPC · JPL
552649	2010 GC_{209}	—	April 9, 2010	Kitt Peak	Spacewatch	THB	2.9 km	MPC · JPL
552650	2010 HX_{119}	—	October 28, 2017	Catalina	CSS	·	3.9 km	MPC · JPL
552651	2010 HN_{125}	—	April 30, 2015	Cerro Paranal	Altmann, M., Prusti, T.	·	2.9 km	MPC · JPL
552652	2010 HQ_{126}	—	October 3, 2005	Kitt Peak	Spacewatch	·	570 m	MPC · JPL
552653	2010 HU_{138}	—	January 28, 2015	Haleakala	Pan-STARRS 1	·	2.5 km	MPC · JPL
552654	2010 HH_{139}	—	June 24, 2017	Haleakala	Pan-STARRS 1	·	2.8 km	MPC · JPL
552655	2010 JU_{2}	—	May 5, 2010	Mount Lemmon	Mount Lemmon Survey	·	2.5 km	MPC · JPL
552656	2010 JP_{32}	—	November 14, 2007	Kitt Peak	Spacewatch	·	2.6 km	MPC · JPL
552657	2010 JD_{44}	—	May 5, 2010	Mount Lemmon	Mount Lemmon Survey	EOS	1.5 km	MPC · JPL
552658	2010 JJ_{44}	—	May 5, 2010	Mount Lemmon	Mount Lemmon Survey	·	820 m	MPC · JPL
552659	2010 JK_{73}	—	October 18, 2007	Mount Lemmon	Mount Lemmon Survey	MAS	700 m	MPC · JPL
552660	2010 JO_{78}	—	May 11, 2010	Mount Lemmon	Mount Lemmon Survey	·	1.9 km	MPC · JPL
552661	2010 JH_{113}	—	April 21, 1999	Kitt Peak	Spacewatch	·	920 m	MPC · JPL
552662	2010 JB_{120}	—	May 12, 2010	Mount Lemmon	Mount Lemmon Survey	EOS	1.9 km	MPC · JPL
552663	2010 JY_{154}	—	October 7, 2012	Haleakala	Pan-STARRS 1	·	2.6 km	MPC · JPL
552664	2010 JV_{159}	—	May 5, 2010	Mount Lemmon	Mount Lemmon Survey	·	1.1 km	MPC · JPL
552665	2010 JO_{160}	—	April 9, 2010	Kitt Peak	Spacewatch	·	2.1 km	MPC · JPL
552666	2010 JV_{163}	—	May 9, 2010	Mount Lemmon	Mount Lemmon Survey	·	840 m	MPC · JPL
552667	2010 JL_{166}	—	May 11, 2010	Mount Lemmon	Mount Lemmon Survey	·	860 m	MPC · JPL
552668	2010 JE_{167}	—	May 11, 2010	Mount Lemmon	Mount Lemmon Survey	·	2.7 km	MPC · JPL
552669	2010 JQ_{167}	—	August 21, 2006	Kitt Peak	Spacewatch	·	2.4 km	MPC · JPL
552670	2010 JK_{168}	—	October 22, 2006	Catalina	CSS	·	3.8 km	MPC · JPL
552671	2010 JP_{170}	—	May 4, 2010	Kitt Peak	Spacewatch	·	3.4 km	MPC · JPL
552672	2010 JZ_{174}	—	March 3, 2009	Mount Lemmon	Mount Lemmon Survey	·	2.6 km	MPC · JPL
552673	2010 JP_{176}	—	November 18, 2007	Kitt Peak	Spacewatch	EOS	1.6 km	MPC · JPL
552674	2010 JH_{178}	—	May 20, 2010	Palomar	Palomar Transient Factory	EOS	2.4 km	MPC · JPL
552675	2010 JC_{184}	—	April 1, 2003	Apache Point	SDSS Collaboration	·	3.4 km	MPC · JPL
552676	2010 JF_{189}	—	February 14, 2005	Kitt Peak	Spacewatch	·	1.6 km	MPC · JPL
552677	2010 JF_{190}	—	January 22, 2015	Haleakala	Pan-STARRS 1	·	1.6 km	MPC · JPL
552678	2010 JG_{210}	—	May 10, 2010	Haleakala	Pan-STARRS 1	centaur	108 km	MPC · JPL
552679	2010 JH_{210}	—	May 10, 2010	Haleakala	Pan-STARRS 1	plutino	179 km	MPC · JPL
552680	2010 JM_{210}	—	September 15, 2012	Kitt Peak	Spacewatch	·	2.6 km	MPC · JPL
552681 Sósvera	2010 JY_{210}	Sósvera	October 21, 2012	Piszkéstető	K. Sárneczky, G. Hodosán	·	2.7 km	MPC · JPL
552682	2010 JL_{211}	—	November 7, 2012	Haleakala	Pan-STARRS 1	·	2.1 km	MPC · JPL
552683	2010 JS_{211}	—	June 5, 2014	Haleakala	Pan-STARRS 1	PHO	780 m	MPC · JPL
552684	2010 JE_{212}	—	April 13, 2011	Kitt Peak	Spacewatch	EUN	1.3 km	MPC · JPL
552685	2010 JA_{213}	—	December 11, 2013	Haleakala	Pan-STARRS 1	·	2.4 km	MPC · JPL
552686	2010 KK_{9}	—	May 16, 2010	La Sagra	OAM	·	2.5 km	MPC · JPL
552687	2010 KC_{39}	—	May 3, 2010	Kitt Peak	Spacewatch	·	910 m	MPC · JPL
552688	2010 KP_{39}	—	May 17, 2010	Kitt Peak	Spacewatch	·	860 m	MPC · JPL
552689	2010 KT_{39}	—	January 20, 2009	Catalina	CSS	·	2.4 km	MPC · JPL
552690	2010 KL_{140}	—	January 21, 2015	Kitt Peak	Spacewatch	·	1.6 km	MPC · JPL
552691	2010 KZ_{157}	—	December 11, 2013	Haleakala	Pan-STARRS 1	EOS	1.6 km	MPC · JPL
552692	2010 LP_{60}	—	June 4, 2010	Nogales	M. Schwartz, P. R. Holvorcem	·	1.1 km	MPC · JPL
552693	2010 LF_{62}	—	January 16, 2009	Kitt Peak	Spacewatch	·	1.1 km	MPC · JPL
552694	2010 LO_{62}	—	June 10, 2010	Catalina	CSS	PHO	1.2 km	MPC · JPL
552695	2010 LW_{62}	—	June 6, 2010	Kitt Peak	Spacewatch	·	2.6 km	MPC · JPL
552696	2010 LS_{67}	—	April 19, 2006	Kitt Peak	Spacewatch	·	1.4 km	MPC · JPL
552697	2010 LL_{134}	—	March 2, 2009	Kitt Peak	Spacewatch	VER	2.6 km	MPC · JPL
552698	2010 LQ_{151}	—	August 10, 2010	Kitt Peak	Spacewatch	·	2.7 km	MPC · JPL
552699	2010 LG_{158}	—	May 11, 2015	Mount Lemmon	Mount Lemmon Survey	·	1.7 km	MPC · JPL
552700	2010 LS_{158}	—	November 7, 2012	Mount Lemmon	Mount Lemmon Survey	·	2.3 km	MPC · JPL

== 552701–552800 ==
back to top

Designation			Discovery			Properties		Ref
Permanent	Provisional	Named after	Date	Site	Discoverer(s)	Category	Diam.	Ref
552701	2010 LT_{158}	—	September 19, 2012	Mount Lemmon	Mount Lemmon Survey	·	2.9 km	MPC · JPL
552702	2010 LU_{158}	—	July 28, 2014	Haleakala	Pan-STARRS 1	·	860 m	MPC · JPL
552703	2010 MG	—	September 10, 2007	Kitt Peak	Spacewatch	·	1.1 km	MPC · JPL
552704	2010 MG_{147}	—	October 19, 1995	Kitt Peak	Spacewatch	URS	3.0 km	MPC · JPL
552705	2010 NO_{71}	—	July 14, 2010	WISE	WISE	·	1.2 km	MPC · JPL
552706	2010 NH_{77}	—	July 15, 2010	WISE	WISE	ADE	1.4 km	MPC · JPL
552707	2010 NF_{108}	—	October 20, 2006	Kitt Peak	Spacewatch	KON	1.6 km	MPC · JPL
552708 Ödmangovender	2010 NU_{119}	Ödmangovender	October 17, 2006	Uccle	P. De Cat	·	1.3 km	MPC · JPL
552709	2010 NW_{131}	—	November 28, 2013	Mount Lemmon	Mount Lemmon Survey	·	2.5 km	MPC · JPL
552710	2010 NE_{139}	—	August 18, 2017	Haleakala	Pan-STARRS 1	·	2.0 km	MPC · JPL
552711	2010 NU_{140}	—	February 16, 2015	Haleakala	Pan-STARRS 1	·	2.2 km	MPC · JPL
552712	2010 NA_{146}	—	December 11, 2012	Mount Lemmon	Mount Lemmon Survey	ULA	5.8 km	MPC · JPL
552713	2010 NL_{146}	—	June 26, 2014	Haleakala	Pan-STARRS 1	·	970 m	MPC · JPL
552714	2010 NR_{147}	—	December 6, 2011	Haleakala	Pan-STARRS 1	·	860 m	MPC · JPL
552715	2010 OM_{126}	—	July 18, 2010	Bergisch Gladbach	W. Bickel	·	1.5 km	MPC · JPL
552716	2010 OL_{140}	—	August 27, 2006	Kitt Peak	Spacewatch	·	2.3 km	MPC · JPL
552717	2010 OT_{145}	—	October 10, 2007	Mount Lemmon	Mount Lemmon Survey	·	2.6 km	MPC · JPL
552718	2010 PA_{24}	—	June 22, 2006	Kitt Peak	Spacewatch	·	1.1 km	MPC · JPL
552719	2010 PR_{58}	—	September 14, 2005	Catalina	CSS	·	3.6 km	MPC · JPL
552720	2010 PV_{63}	—	September 28, 2006	Catalina	CSS	·	1.7 km	MPC · JPL
552721	2010 PD_{77}	—	August 13, 2010	Kitt Peak	Spacewatch	LIX	3.2 km	MPC · JPL
552722	2010 PY_{80}	—	September 10, 2010	Catalina	CSS	·	3.8 km	MPC · JPL
552723	2010 PF_{88}	—	August 12, 2010	Kitt Peak	Spacewatch	MAS	620 m	MPC · JPL
552724	2010 QR_{7}	—	August 19, 2006	Kitt Peak	Spacewatch	·	1.2 km	MPC · JPL
552725	2010 RS_{2}	—	July 25, 2006	Palomar	NEAT	·	1.6 km	MPC · JPL
552726	2010 RU_{8}	—	August 6, 2010	Kitt Peak	Spacewatch	HNS	920 m	MPC · JPL
552727 Hauszmann	2010 RQ_{11}	Hauszmann	September 2, 2010	Piszkéstető	K. Sárneczky, Z. Kuli	·	860 m	MPC · JPL
552728	2010 RC_{38}	—	September 5, 2010	La Sagra	OAM	BRG	1.1 km	MPC · JPL
552729	2010 RH_{38}	—	September 5, 2010	Mount Lemmon	Mount Lemmon Survey	·	1.3 km	MPC · JPL
552730	2010 RL_{38}	—	September 5, 2010	Mount Lemmon	Mount Lemmon Survey	·	3.1 km	MPC · JPL
552731	2010 RY_{38}	—	September 5, 2010	Mount Lemmon	Mount Lemmon Survey	NYS	740 m	MPC · JPL
552732	2010 RJ_{40}	—	September 5, 2010	Socorro	LINEAR	·	1.7 km	MPC · JPL
552733 Grétsylászló	2010 RY_{43}	Grétsylászló	September 4, 2010	Piszkéstető	K. Sárneczky, Z. Kuli	MAS	630 m	MPC · JPL
552734	2010 RF_{58}	—	August 21, 2006	Kitt Peak	Spacewatch	·	890 m	MPC · JPL
552735	2010 RU_{60}	—	September 6, 2010	Kitt Peak	Spacewatch	·	1.3 km	MPC · JPL
552736	2010 RO_{66}	—	January 18, 2008	Kitt Peak	Spacewatch	·	3.0 km	MPC · JPL
552737	2010 RP_{78}	—	May 30, 2006	Mount Lemmon	Mount Lemmon Survey	NYS	1.0 km	MPC · JPL
552738	2010 RC_{99}	—	August 29, 2005	Kitt Peak	Spacewatch	BRA	1.1 km	MPC · JPL
552739	2010 RT_{99}	—	September 10, 2010	Kitt Peak	Spacewatch	·	1.1 km	MPC · JPL
552740	2010 RT_{109}	—	September 14, 2010	Mount Lemmon	Mount Lemmon Survey	VER	3.1 km	MPC · JPL
552741	2010 RD_{111}	—	September 11, 2010	Kitt Peak	Spacewatch	·	1.4 km	MPC · JPL
552742	2010 RK_{113}	—	September 11, 2010	Kitt Peak	Spacewatch	·	570 m	MPC · JPL
552743	2010 RW_{117}	—	February 7, 2003	La Silla	Barbieri, C.	·	1.3 km	MPC · JPL
552744	2010 RZ_{117}	—	October 18, 2006	Kitt Peak	Spacewatch	·	940 m	MPC · JPL
552745	2010 RW_{140}	—	August 17, 2006	Palomar	NEAT	NYS	950 m	MPC · JPL
552746 Annanobili	2010 RN_{154}	Annanobili	September 11, 2010	Andrushivka	Y. Ivaščenko	·	1.4 km	MPC · JPL
552747	2010 RP_{156}	—	September 15, 2010	Kitt Peak	Spacewatch	·	2.1 km	MPC · JPL
552748 Garasdezső	2010 RN_{164}	Garasdezső	September 6, 2010	Piszkéstető	K. Sárneczky, Z. Kuli	MAR	740 m	MPC · JPL
552749	2010 RW_{166}	—	September 12, 2010	ESA OGS	ESA OGS	·	1.3 km	MPC · JPL
552750 Valasek	2010 RW_{173}	Valasek	September 6, 2010	Piszkéstető	K. Sárneczky, Z. Kuli	MAR	800 m	MPC · JPL
552751	2010 RX_{176}	—	September 10, 2010	Ka-Dar	Gerke, V.	·	1.3 km	MPC · JPL
552752	2010 RE_{177}	—	September 11, 2010	Kitt Peak	Spacewatch	·	930 m	MPC · JPL
552753	2010 RG_{181}	—	September 10, 2010	Kitt Peak	Spacewatch	·	830 m	MPC · JPL
552754	2010 RJ_{191}	—	January 28, 2003	Apache Point	SDSS Collaboration	·	2.8 km	MPC · JPL
552755	2010 RA_{192}	—	January 10, 2013	Kitt Peak	Spacewatch	EOS	1.9 km	MPC · JPL
552756	2010 RC_{192}	—	July 31, 2000	Cerro Tololo	Deep Ecliptic Survey	·	2.0 km	MPC · JPL
552757	2010 RE_{193}	—	September 11, 2010	Mount Lemmon	Mount Lemmon Survey	·	2.5 km	MPC · JPL
552758	2010 RY_{195}	—	September 5, 2010	Mount Lemmon	Mount Lemmon Survey	·	1.0 km	MPC · JPL
552759	2010 SA_{2}	—	November 24, 2006	Catalina	CSS	JUN	1.0 km	MPC · JPL
552760	2010 SN_{2}	—	October 23, 2006	Mount Lemmon	Mount Lemmon Survey	·	1.0 km	MPC · JPL
552761	2010 SQ_{9}	—	September 17, 2010	Mount Lemmon	Mount Lemmon Survey	·	1.1 km	MPC · JPL
552762	2010 SZ_{9}	—	September 17, 2010	Mount Lemmon	Mount Lemmon Survey	EUN	840 m	MPC · JPL
552763	2010 SJ_{11}	—	April 27, 2009	Catalina	CSS	·	1.7 km	MPC · JPL
552764	2010 SV_{17}	—	September 30, 2006	Mount Lemmon	Mount Lemmon Survey	·	640 m	MPC · JPL
552765	2010 SH_{23}	—	November 20, 2006	Catalina	CSS	·	1.8 km	MPC · JPL
552766	2010 SH_{28}	—	September 29, 2010	Kitt Peak	Spacewatch	·	1.1 km	MPC · JPL
552767	2010 SF_{30}	—	September 10, 2010	Kitt Peak	Spacewatch	·	1.4 km	MPC · JPL
552768	2010 SD_{40}	—	September 30, 2010	Mount Lemmon	Mount Lemmon Survey	EUN	960 m	MPC · JPL
552769	2010 SX_{40}	—	September 30, 2010	La Sagra	OAM	·	1.8 km	MPC · JPL
552770	2010 SU_{44}	—	February 11, 2018	Haleakala	Pan-STARRS 1	EOS	1.5 km	MPC · JPL
552771	2010 SK_{48}	—	September 16, 2010	Kitt Peak	Spacewatch	EUN	960 m	MPC · JPL
552772	2010 SM_{50}	—	February 3, 2017	Haleakala	Pan-STARRS 1	·	1.3 km	MPC · JPL
552773	2010 SX_{54}	—	September 18, 2010	Mount Lemmon	Mount Lemmon Survey	·	1.2 km	MPC · JPL
552774	2010 TC	—	March 6, 2008	Mount Lemmon	Mount Lemmon Survey	HNS	960 m	MPC · JPL
552775	2010 TK_{4}	—	October 2, 2010	Kitt Peak	Spacewatch	·	2.3 km	MPC · JPL
552776	2010 TN_{5}	—	November 22, 2006	Catalina	CSS	·	1.3 km	MPC · JPL
552777	2010 TQ_{5}	—	September 16, 2010	Kitt Peak	Spacewatch	EUN	930 m	MPC · JPL
552778	2010 TC_{10}	—	March 3, 2009	Kitt Peak	Spacewatch	·	750 m	MPC · JPL
552779	2010 TO_{11}	—	September 17, 2010	Catalina	CSS	·	1.6 km	MPC · JPL
552780	2010 TV_{14}	—	October 21, 2006	Kitt Peak	Spacewatch	·	960 m	MPC · JPL
552781	2010 TA_{17}	—	October 3, 2010	Kitt Peak	Spacewatch	·	980 m	MPC · JPL
552782	2010 TJ_{22}	—	January 18, 2004	Catalina	CSS	·	1.6 km	MPC · JPL
552783	2010 TC_{25}	—	October 1, 2010	Catalina	CSS	·	1.5 km	MPC · JPL
552784 Jeanbrahier	2010 TP_{38}	Jeanbrahier	October 6, 2010	Vicques	M. Ory	·	2.8 km	MPC · JPL
552785	2010 TS_{43}	—	September 10, 2010	Kitt Peak	Spacewatch	MIS	1.6 km	MPC · JPL
552786	2010 TE_{46}	—	November 1, 2006	Kitt Peak	Spacewatch	(5)	1.1 km	MPC · JPL
552787	2010 TF_{47}	—	September 27, 2006	Mount Lemmon	Mount Lemmon Survey	·	1.0 km	MPC · JPL
552788	2010 TV_{59}	—	September 17, 2010	Mount Lemmon	Mount Lemmon Survey	EUN	1.0 km	MPC · JPL
552789	2010 TL_{64}	—	October 2, 2006	Kitt Peak	Spacewatch	MAR	850 m	MPC · JPL
552790	2010 TF_{69}	—	September 4, 2010	Kitt Peak	Spacewatch	·	1.3 km	MPC · JPL
552791	2010 TJ_{70}	—	September 4, 2010	Kitt Peak	Spacewatch	·	1.2 km	MPC · JPL
552792	2010 TJ_{71}	—	November 4, 2005	Mount Lemmon	Mount Lemmon Survey	·	2.5 km	MPC · JPL
552793	2010 TU_{73}	—	September 18, 2010	Kitt Peak	Spacewatch	KOR	890 m	MPC · JPL
552794	2010 TB_{77}	—	December 7, 2006	Palomar	NEAT	(5)	1.5 km	MPC · JPL
552795	2010 TS_{78}	—	October 8, 2010	Kitt Peak	Spacewatch	(12739)	1.3 km	MPC · JPL
552796	2010 TB_{84}	—	September 19, 2006	Kitt Peak	Spacewatch	·	780 m	MPC · JPL
552797	2010 TC_{102}	—	September 30, 2010	Mount Lemmon	Mount Lemmon Survey	·	900 m	MPC · JPL
552798	2010 TY_{102}	—	October 9, 2010	Mount Lemmon	Mount Lemmon Survey	BRG	1.4 km	MPC · JPL
552799	2010 TN_{104}	—	October 9, 2010	Mount Lemmon	Mount Lemmon Survey	EUN	770 m	MPC · JPL
552800	2010 TE_{105}	—	October 20, 2006	Kitt Peak	Spacewatch	·	1.4 km	MPC · JPL

== 552801–552900 ==
back to top

Designation			Discovery			Properties		Ref
Permanent	Provisional	Named after	Date	Site	Discoverer(s)	Category	Diam.	Ref
552801	2010 TR_{105}	—	October 2, 2010	Kitt Peak	Spacewatch	·	1.4 km	MPC · JPL
552802	2010 TM_{113}	—	October 17, 2001	Kitt Peak	Spacewatch	·	1.4 km	MPC · JPL
552803	2010 TV_{116}	—	September 17, 2010	Mount Lemmon	Mount Lemmon Survey	·	1.1 km	MPC · JPL
552804	2010 TH_{118}	—	March 2, 2008	Kitt Peak	Spacewatch	·	1.1 km	MPC · JPL
552805	2010 TJ_{126}	—	September 30, 2010	Catalina	CSS	(1547)	1.4 km	MPC · JPL
552806	2010 TR_{127}	—	December 27, 2006	Mount Lemmon	Mount Lemmon Survey	MIS	1.9 km	MPC · JPL
552807	2010 TX_{127}	—	October 11, 2010	Bergisch Gladbach	W. Bickel	·	1.5 km	MPC · JPL
552808	2010 TH_{132}	—	October 11, 2010	Mount Lemmon	Mount Lemmon Survey	(5)	720 m	MPC · JPL
552809	2010 TB_{136}	—	May 14, 2005	Kitt Peak	Spacewatch	·	990 m	MPC · JPL
552810	2010 TE_{141}	—	October 11, 2010	Mount Lemmon	Mount Lemmon Survey	·	1.4 km	MPC · JPL
552811	2010 TU_{142}	—	October 11, 2010	Mount Lemmon	Mount Lemmon Survey	·	1.1 km	MPC · JPL
552812	2010 TK_{145}	—	October 11, 2010	Mount Lemmon	Mount Lemmon Survey	JUN	1.0 km	MPC · JPL
552813	2010 TB_{150}	—	August 3, 2001	Palomar	NEAT	·	2.3 km	MPC · JPL
552814	2010 TU_{154}	—	September 18, 2010	Mount Lemmon	Mount Lemmon Survey	EUN	820 m	MPC · JPL
552815	2010 TF_{159}	—	October 10, 2010	Mount Lemmon	Mount Lemmon Survey	JUN	690 m	MPC · JPL
552816	2010 TY_{179}	—	September 27, 2006	Kitt Peak	Spacewatch	·	760 m	MPC · JPL
552817	2010 TN_{183}	—	October 23, 2006	Kitt Peak	Spacewatch	·	1.1 km	MPC · JPL
552818	2010 TU_{183}	—	November 4, 2010	Mount Lemmon	Mount Lemmon Survey	·	4.3 km	MPC · JPL
552819	2010 TJ_{184}	—	August 15, 2006	Palomar	NEAT	·	1.5 km	MPC · JPL
552820	2010 TM_{184}	—	January 19, 2012	Kitt Peak	Spacewatch	·	1.4 km	MPC · JPL
552821	2010 TU_{186}	—	December 9, 2010	Catalina	CSS	·	1.3 km	MPC · JPL
552822	2010 TA_{187}	—	October 29, 2010	Mount Lemmon	Mount Lemmon Survey	·	920 m	MPC · JPL
552823	2010 TN_{187}	—	October 9, 2010	Catalina	CSS	·	1.2 km	MPC · JPL
552824	2010 TJ_{191}	—	October 3, 2010	Kitt Peak	Spacewatch	HOF	2.0 km	MPC · JPL
552825	2010 TH_{197}	—	October 14, 2010	Mount Lemmon	Mount Lemmon Survey	·	990 m	MPC · JPL
552826	2010 TQ_{199}	—	July 29, 2014	Haleakala	Pan-STARRS 1	·	1.2 km	MPC · JPL
552827	2010 TZ_{199}	—	May 16, 2013	Mount Lemmon	Mount Lemmon Survey	·	590 m	MPC · JPL
552828	2010 TY_{201}	—	October 10, 2010	Kitt Peak	Spacewatch	EUN	810 m	MPC · JPL
552829	2010 TE_{203}	—	October 3, 2010	Kitt Peak	Spacewatch	·	1.4 km	MPC · JPL
552830	2010 TV_{203}	—	October 3, 2010	Kitt Peak	Spacewatch	·	1.3 km	MPC · JPL
552831	2010 TL_{204}	—	April 12, 2013	Haleakala	Pan-STARRS 1	·	1.1 km	MPC · JPL
552832	2010 TC_{205}	—	October 13, 2010	Mount Lemmon	Mount Lemmon Survey	·	930 m	MPC · JPL
552833	2010 TH_{212}	—	September 30, 2010	Mount Lemmon	Mount Lemmon Survey	·	3.3 km	MPC · JPL
552834	2010 TK_{212}	—	October 14, 2010	Mount Lemmon	Mount Lemmon Survey	EUN	1.0 km	MPC · JPL
552835	2010 TF_{214}	—	October 12, 2010	Mount Lemmon	Mount Lemmon Survey	V	490 m	MPC · JPL
552836	2010 TM_{214}	—	October 14, 2010	Catalina	CSS	·	1.4 km	MPC · JPL
552837	2010 TC_{215}	—	October 2, 2010	Mount Lemmon	Mount Lemmon Survey	·	1.6 km	MPC · JPL
552838	2010 TS_{218}	—	October 11, 2010	Mount Lemmon	Mount Lemmon Survey	·	2.9 km	MPC · JPL
552839	2010 UQ_{1}	—	October 17, 2010	Mount Lemmon	Mount Lemmon Survey	·	930 m	MPC · JPL
552840	2010 UE_{4}	—	October 31, 2006	Mount Lemmon	Mount Lemmon Survey	·	1.1 km	MPC · JPL
552841	2010 UJ_{6}	—	October 17, 2010	Mount Lemmon	Mount Lemmon Survey	·	1.1 km	MPC · JPL
552842	2010 UH_{11}	—	November 13, 2006	Catalina	CSS	·	1.8 km	MPC · JPL
552843	2010 UR_{14}	—	August 17, 2001	Palomar	NEAT	ADE	2.6 km	MPC · JPL
552844	2010 UU_{14}	—	October 1, 2010	Mount Lemmon	Mount Lemmon Survey	·	1.3 km	MPC · JPL
552845	2010 UE_{16}	—	October 11, 2010	Saint-Sulpice	B. Christophe	·	1.8 km	MPC · JPL
552846	2010 UM_{18}	—	September 30, 2005	Mount Lemmon	Mount Lemmon Survey	KOR	1.1 km	MPC · JPL
552847 Steinaurél	2010 UZ_{29}	Steinaurél	October 28, 2010	Piszkéstető	S. Kürti, K. Sárneczky	·	1.4 km	MPC · JPL
552848	2010 UW_{37}	—	October 11, 2010	Mount Lemmon	Mount Lemmon Survey	·	1.7 km	MPC · JPL
552849	2010 UH_{39}	—	September 28, 2006	Mount Lemmon	Mount Lemmon Survey	·	1.2 km	MPC · JPL
552850	2010 UP_{45}	—	October 13, 2010	Mount Lemmon	Mount Lemmon Survey	·	1.4 km	MPC · JPL
552851	2010 UV_{50}	—	October 31, 2010	Mount Lemmon	Mount Lemmon Survey	·	1.1 km	MPC · JPL
552852	2010 UX_{50}	—	September 17, 2010	Mount Lemmon	Mount Lemmon Survey	·	1.2 km	MPC · JPL
552853	2010 UE_{54}	—	October 29, 2010	Kitt Peak	Spacewatch	(5)	1.2 km	MPC · JPL
552854	2010 UD_{57}	—	October 4, 2006	Mount Lemmon	Mount Lemmon Survey	MAR	880 m	MPC · JPL
552855 Hoitsy	2010 UZ_{63}	Hoitsy	October 31, 2010	Piszkéstető	S. Kürti, K. Sárneczky	·	930 m	MPC · JPL
552856	2010 UG_{81}	—	October 31, 2010	Kitt Peak	Spacewatch	HNS	1.1 km	MPC · JPL
552857	2010 UZ_{93}	—	August 14, 2001	Haleakala	NEAT	·	1.9 km	MPC · JPL
552858	2010 UR_{94}	—	September 2, 2005	Palomar	NEAT	·	2.9 km	MPC · JPL
552859	2010 UD_{95}	—	July 21, 2001	Palomar	NEAT	·	1.9 km	MPC · JPL
552860	2010 UJ_{103}	—	November 3, 2010	Mount Lemmon	Mount Lemmon Survey	·	1.1 km	MPC · JPL
552861	2010 UZ_{106}	—	October 11, 2010	Mount Lemmon	Mount Lemmon Survey	·	1.3 km	MPC · JPL
552862	2010 UF_{109}	—	October 17, 2010	Mount Lemmon	Mount Lemmon Survey	·	1.3 km	MPC · JPL
552863	2010 UN_{111}	—	October 17, 2010	Mount Lemmon	Mount Lemmon Survey	·	1.2 km	MPC · JPL
552864	2010 UG_{113}	—	February 9, 2007	Kitt Peak	Spacewatch	·	1.3 km	MPC · JPL
552865	2010 UA_{118}	—	March 15, 2013	Mount Lemmon	Mount Lemmon Survey	VER	1.9 km	MPC · JPL
552866	2010 UX_{120}	—	April 14, 2008	Kitt Peak	Spacewatch	·	1.4 km	MPC · JPL
552867	2010 UF_{125}	—	October 31, 2010	Mount Lemmon	Mount Lemmon Survey	·	510 m	MPC · JPL
552868	2010 UG_{125}	—	October 17, 2010	Mount Lemmon	Mount Lemmon Survey	·	1.8 km	MPC · JPL
552869	2010 VC_{2}	—	October 11, 2010	Mount Lemmon	Mount Lemmon Survey	·	950 m	MPC · JPL
552870	2010 VP_{2}	—	October 19, 2006	Mount Lemmon	Mount Lemmon Survey	·	1.1 km	MPC · JPL
552871	2010 VX_{6}	—	November 1, 2010	Kitt Peak	Spacewatch	·	930 m	MPC · JPL
552872	2010 VG_{20}	—	September 4, 2010	Kitt Peak	Spacewatch	·	1.6 km	MPC · JPL
552873	2010 VS_{20}	—	October 22, 2006	Catalina	CSS	·	1.4 km	MPC · JPL
552874	2010 VM_{21}	—	November 6, 2010	Catalina	CSS	H	560 m	MPC · JPL
552875	2010 VK_{22}	—	January 10, 2007	Mount Lemmon	Mount Lemmon Survey	·	1.2 km	MPC · JPL
552876	2010 VE_{23}	—	February 6, 2008	Kitt Peak	Spacewatch	·	990 m	MPC · JPL
552877	2010 VP_{32}	—	November 3, 2010	Mount Lemmon	Mount Lemmon Survey	·	1.2 km	MPC · JPL
552878	2010 VG_{39}	—	September 29, 2005	Catalina	CSS	·	2.2 km	MPC · JPL
552879	2010 VW_{47}	—	November 2, 2010	Kitt Peak	Spacewatch	·	1.1 km	MPC · JPL
552880	2010 VV_{65}	—	November 1, 2010	Mount Lemmon	Mount Lemmon Survey	(5)	1.0 km	MPC · JPL
552881	2010 VU_{66}	—	November 2, 2010	Mount Lemmon	Mount Lemmon Survey	MAR	630 m	MPC · JPL
552882	2010 VE_{70}	—	November 5, 2010	Kitt Peak	Spacewatch	V	570 m	MPC · JPL
552883	2010 VC_{73}	—	November 23, 2006	Kitt Peak	Spacewatch	·	1.3 km	MPC · JPL
552884	2010 VO_{73}	—	November 2, 2010	Mount Lemmon	Mount Lemmon Survey	RAF	760 m	MPC · JPL
552885	2010 VX_{76}	—	November 17, 2006	Mount Lemmon	Mount Lemmon Survey	(5)	1.2 km	MPC · JPL
552886	2010 VJ_{81}	—	November 3, 2010	Kitt Peak	Spacewatch	·	1.3 km	MPC · JPL
552887	2010 VK_{82}	—	November 3, 2010	Mount Lemmon	Mount Lemmon Survey	·	820 m	MPC · JPL
552888 Felixrodriguez	2010 VA_{83}	Felixrodriguez	November 5, 2010	Pla D'Arguines	R. Ferrando, Ferrando, M.	·	1.6 km	MPC · JPL
552889	2010 VJ_{84}	—	April 7, 2008	Kitt Peak	Spacewatch	·	1.3 km	MPC · JPL
552890	2010 VH_{88}	—	November 6, 2010	Kitt Peak	Spacewatch	·	1.2 km	MPC · JPL
552891	2010 VK_{95}	—	November 8, 2010	Kitt Peak	Spacewatch	EUN	1.2 km	MPC · JPL
552892	2010 VH_{97}	—	October 30, 2010	Piszkés-tető	K. Sárneczky, Z. Kuli	MAR	1.0 km	MPC · JPL
552893	2010 VK_{97}	—	February 6, 2007	Palomar	NEAT	·	1.7 km	MPC · JPL
552894	2010 VD_{98}	—	September 16, 2010	Mount Lemmon	Mount Lemmon Survey	EUN	930 m	MPC · JPL
552895	2010 VK_{107}	—	September 11, 2010	Mount Lemmon	Mount Lemmon Survey	·	1.2 km	MPC · JPL
552896	2010 VC_{110}	—	September 11, 2010	Mount Lemmon	Mount Lemmon Survey	·	1.2 km	MPC · JPL
552897	2010 VE_{116}	—	November 24, 2006	Mount Nyukasa	Japan Aerospace Exploration Agency	·	1.5 km	MPC · JPL
552898	2010 VR_{123}	—	November 8, 2010	Mount Lemmon	Mount Lemmon Survey	MAR	810 m	MPC · JPL
552899	2010 VM_{134}	—	November 1, 2010	Kitt Peak	Spacewatch	·	1.2 km	MPC · JPL
552900	2010 VS_{134}	—	November 1, 2010	Kitt Peak	Spacewatch	·	1.0 km	MPC · JPL

== 552901–553000 ==
back to top

Designation			Discovery			Properties		Ref
Permanent	Provisional	Named after	Date	Site	Discoverer(s)	Category	Diam.	Ref
552901	2010 VW_{134}	—	September 11, 2010	Mount Lemmon	Mount Lemmon Survey	·	990 m	MPC · JPL
552902	2010 VT_{135}	—	November 1, 2010	Kitt Peak	Spacewatch	·	2.4 km	MPC · JPL
552903	2010 VG_{139}	—	November 7, 2010	Mount Lemmon	Mount Lemmon Survey	·	1.4 km	MPC · JPL
552904	2010 VY_{146}	—	February 17, 2007	Mount Lemmon	Mount Lemmon Survey	AEO	790 m	MPC · JPL
552905	2010 VB_{149}	—	November 6, 2010	Mount Lemmon	Mount Lemmon Survey	(5)	1.1 km	MPC · JPL
552906	2010 VL_{149}	—	November 6, 2010	Mount Lemmon	Mount Lemmon Survey	·	1.3 km	MPC · JPL
552907	2010 VT_{149}	—	November 11, 2002	Socorro	LINEAR	·	930 m	MPC · JPL
552908	2010 VG_{150}	—	November 6, 2010	Mount Lemmon	Mount Lemmon Survey	·	1.3 km	MPC · JPL
552909	2010 VN_{150}	—	November 6, 2010	Mount Lemmon	Mount Lemmon Survey	·	1.3 km	MPC · JPL
552910	2010 VZ_{151}	—	November 6, 2010	Mount Lemmon	Mount Lemmon Survey	·	1.4 km	MPC · JPL
552911	2010 VP_{164}	—	November 10, 2010	Mount Lemmon	Mount Lemmon Survey	·	930 m	MPC · JPL
552912	2010 VW_{165}	—	October 19, 2010	Mount Lemmon	Mount Lemmon Survey	·	1.2 km	MPC · JPL
552913	2010 VU_{168}	—	November 1, 2010	Kitt Peak	Spacewatch	·	1.2 km	MPC · JPL
552914	2010 VH_{176}	—	November 11, 2010	Catalina	CSS	·	1.8 km	MPC · JPL
552915	2010 VZ_{178}	—	November 10, 2010	Catalina	CSS	·	930 m	MPC · JPL
552916	2010 VX_{180}	—	May 29, 2009	Mount Lemmon	Mount Lemmon Survey	·	1.1 km	MPC · JPL
552917	2010 VT_{182}	—	November 1, 2010	Marly	P. Kocher	·	1.2 km	MPC · JPL
552918	2010 VX_{183}	—	November 27, 2006	Kitt Peak	Spacewatch	·	1.4 km	MPC · JPL
552919	2010 VZ_{190}	—	November 8, 2010	Catalina	CSS	PHO	1.3 km	MPC · JPL
552920	2010 VE_{195}	—	October 31, 2010	Catalina	CSS	·	2.0 km	MPC · JPL
552921	2010 VM_{198}	—	October 29, 2010	Mount Lemmon	Mount Lemmon Survey	NEM	1.8 km	MPC · JPL
552922	2010 VK_{199}	—	October 17, 2006	Catalina	CSS	·	1.7 km	MPC · JPL
552923	2010 VV_{200}	—	November 6, 2010	Mount Lemmon	Mount Lemmon Survey	EUN	1.2 km	MPC · JPL
552924	2010 VH_{201}	—	December 21, 2006	Kitt Peak	Spacewatch	·	2.1 km	MPC · JPL
552925	2010 VU_{207}	—	November 15, 2006	Kitt Peak	Spacewatch	·	910 m	MPC · JPL
552926	2010 VX_{207}	—	September 17, 2010	Mount Lemmon	Mount Lemmon Survey	·	1.2 km	MPC · JPL
552927	2010 VO_{212}	—	November 11, 2010	Mayhill	L. Elenin	·	1.2 km	MPC · JPL
552928	2010 VC_{219}	—	November 5, 2010	Mount Lemmon	Mount Lemmon Survey	·	1.6 km	MPC · JPL
552929	2010 VD_{227}	—	November 3, 2010	Mount Lemmon	Mount Lemmon Survey	·	1.7 km	MPC · JPL
552930	2010 VT_{227}	—	November 12, 2010	Mount Lemmon	Mount Lemmon Survey	·	1.5 km	MPC · JPL
552931	2010 VL_{230}	—	September 13, 2014	Haleakala	Pan-STARRS 1	PHO	730 m	MPC · JPL
552932	2010 VY_{230}	—	November 3, 2010	Mount Lemmon	Mount Lemmon Survey	·	1.5 km	MPC · JPL
552933	2010 VA_{231}	—	April 7, 2013	Kitt Peak	Spacewatch	·	1.1 km	MPC · JPL
552934	2010 VJ_{231}	—	November 3, 2010	Mount Lemmon	Mount Lemmon Survey	·	1.2 km	MPC · JPL
552935	2010 VR_{231}	—	November 3, 2010	Mount Lemmon	Mount Lemmon Survey	·	920 m	MPC · JPL
552936	2010 VO_{232}	—	April 17, 2013	Haleakala	Pan-STARRS 1	EUN	1.2 km	MPC · JPL
552937	2010 VA_{234}	—	April 26, 2003	Kitt Peak	Spacewatch	·	1.5 km	MPC · JPL
552938	2010 VQ_{238}	—	November 1, 2010	Mount Lemmon	Mount Lemmon Survey	GAL	2.0 km	MPC · JPL
552939	2010 VK_{249}	—	November 3, 2005	Mount Lemmon	Mount Lemmon Survey	·	1.5 km	MPC · JPL
552940	2010 VM_{250}	—	November 10, 2010	Mount Lemmon	Mount Lemmon Survey	·	1.1 km	MPC · JPL
552941	2010 VU_{250}	—	November 5, 2010	Kitt Peak	Spacewatch	·	1.0 km	MPC · JPL
552942	2010 VU_{251}	—	November 8, 2010	Mount Lemmon	Mount Lemmon Survey	·	4.1 km	MPC · JPL
552943	2010 VP_{253}	—	November 5, 2010	Kitt Peak	Spacewatch	·	930 m	MPC · JPL
552944	2010 VD_{255}	—	November 11, 2010	Mount Lemmon	Mount Lemmon Survey	·	1.5 km	MPC · JPL
552945	2010 VG_{256}	—	November 13, 2010	Mount Lemmon	Mount Lemmon Survey	·	1 km	MPC · JPL
552946	2010 VQ_{260}	—	November 14, 2010	Mount Lemmon	Mount Lemmon Survey	·	1.5 km	MPC · JPL
552947	2010 WS_{2}	—	November 12, 2010	Kitt Peak	Spacewatch	·	990 m	MPC · JPL
552948	2010 WW_{6}	—	January 8, 2007	Mount Lemmon	Mount Lemmon Survey	·	1.2 km	MPC · JPL
552949	2010 WY_{6}	—	November 27, 2010	Mount Lemmon	Mount Lemmon Survey	·	1.4 km	MPC · JPL
552950	2010 WL_{11}	—	February 28, 2008	Mount Lemmon	Mount Lemmon Survey	·	1.7 km	MPC · JPL
552951	2010 WO_{14}	—	November 11, 2010	Kitt Peak	Spacewatch	·	1.1 km	MPC · JPL
552952	2010 WM_{15}	—	November 2, 2010	Kitt Peak	Spacewatch	·	1.1 km	MPC · JPL
552953	2010 WQ_{15}	—	September 5, 2010	Mount Lemmon	Mount Lemmon Survey	·	1.0 km	MPC · JPL
552954	2010 WP_{18}	—	November 14, 2010	Kitt Peak	Spacewatch	·	1.3 km	MPC · JPL
552955	2010 WL_{20}	—	October 29, 2010	Kitt Peak	Spacewatch	EUN	1.1 km	MPC · JPL
552956	2010 WY_{24}	—	November 27, 2010	Mount Lemmon	Mount Lemmon Survey	·	1.2 km	MPC · JPL
552957	2010 WT_{29}	—	November 6, 2010	Catalina	CSS	·	1.5 km	MPC · JPL
552958	2010 WJ_{33}	—	November 27, 2010	Mount Lemmon	Mount Lemmon Survey	·	1.3 km	MPC · JPL
552959	2010 WA_{41}	—	November 6, 2010	Kitt Peak	Spacewatch	·	1.1 km	MPC · JPL
552960	2010 WK_{42}	—	November 27, 2010	Mount Lemmon	Mount Lemmon Survey	·	1.3 km	MPC · JPL
552961	2010 WE_{45}	—	February 9, 2008	Mount Lemmon	Mount Lemmon Survey	V	660 m	MPC · JPL
552962	2010 WR_{51}	—	December 9, 2001	Palomar	NEAT	·	2.0 km	MPC · JPL
552963	2010 WC_{55}	—	February 27, 2004	Kitt Peak	Deep Ecliptic Survey	NYS	900 m	MPC · JPL
552964	2010 WE_{56}	—	February 25, 2007	Mount Lemmon	Mount Lemmon Survey	·	2.9 km	MPC · JPL
552965	2010 WQ_{56}	—	April 14, 2008	Mount Lemmon	Mount Lemmon Survey	·	1.5 km	MPC · JPL
552966	2010 WT_{56}	—	May 3, 2008	Mount Lemmon	Mount Lemmon Survey	·	1.5 km	MPC · JPL
552967	2010 WN_{63}	—	November 27, 2010	Mount Lemmon	Mount Lemmon Survey	·	1.5 km	MPC · JPL
552968	2010 WT_{63}	—	November 27, 2010	Mount Lemmon	Mount Lemmon Survey	·	1.5 km	MPC · JPL
552969	2010 WC_{65}	—	November 28, 2010	Mount Lemmon	Mount Lemmon Survey	·	1.1 km	MPC · JPL
552970	2010 WT_{67}	—	November 30, 2010	Mount Lemmon	Mount Lemmon Survey	·	1.2 km	MPC · JPL
552971	2010 WE_{69}	—	October 15, 2001	Palomar	NEAT	·	1.9 km	MPC · JPL
552972	2010 WJ_{69}	—	November 7, 2010	Mount Lemmon	Mount Lemmon Survey	·	1.8 km	MPC · JPL
552973	2010 WM_{71}	—	September 21, 2001	Anderson Mesa	LONEOS	·	1.7 km	MPC · JPL
552974	2010 WQ_{71}	—	October 29, 2010	Mount Lemmon	Mount Lemmon Survey	EUN	1.1 km	MPC · JPL
552975	2010 WU_{72}	—	October 14, 2010	Mount Lemmon	Mount Lemmon Survey	·	1.2 km	MPC · JPL
552976	2010 WQ_{74}	—	April 16, 2012	Bergisch Gladbach	W. Bickel	EUN	1.1 km	MPC · JPL
552977	2010 XK_{2}	—	November 19, 2006	Kitt Peak	Spacewatch	MAR	1.3 km	MPC · JPL
552978	2010 XL_{4}	—	November 13, 2010	Mount Lemmon	Mount Lemmon Survey	(5)	1.3 km	MPC · JPL
552979	2010 XV_{4}	—	April 12, 2004	Kitt Peak	Spacewatch	·	1.8 km	MPC · JPL
552980	2010 XF_{5}	—	August 5, 2005	Palomar	NEAT	·	1.5 km	MPC · JPL
552981	2010 XU_{6}	—	December 2, 2010	Mount Lemmon	Mount Lemmon Survey	·	1.2 km	MPC · JPL
552982	2010 XG_{8}	—	November 12, 2010	Charleston	R. Holmes	·	1.5 km	MPC · JPL
552983	2010 XD_{14}	—	December 3, 2010	Mount Lemmon	Mount Lemmon Survey	(5)	900 m	MPC · JPL
552984	2010 XP_{18}	—	July 13, 2001	Palomar	NEAT	(5)	2.7 km	MPC · JPL
552985	2010 XD_{20}	—	December 5, 2010	Mount Lemmon	Mount Lemmon Survey	·	1.1 km	MPC · JPL
552986	2010 XS_{24}	—	January 31, 2003	Anderson Mesa	LONEOS	EUN	1.3 km	MPC · JPL
552987	2010 XY_{29}	—	December 1, 2010	Mount Lemmon	Mount Lemmon Survey	GAL	1.6 km	MPC · JPL
552988	2010 XQ_{31}	—	November 11, 2010	Mount Lemmon	Mount Lemmon Survey	·	1.2 km	MPC · JPL
552989	2010 XF_{33}	—	September 21, 2001	Kitt Peak	Spacewatch	·	1.5 km	MPC · JPL
552990	2010 XY_{36}	—	November 23, 2006	Mount Lemmon	Mount Lemmon Survey	·	1.8 km	MPC · JPL
552991	2010 XN_{37}	—	January 9, 2002	Socorro	LINEAR	·	1.5 km	MPC · JPL
552992	2010 XJ_{39}	—	October 14, 2005	Kitt Peak	Spacewatch	CLO	1.7 km	MPC · JPL
552993	2010 XV_{43}	—	December 6, 2010	Catalina	CSS	EUN	1.1 km	MPC · JPL
552994	2010 XC_{45}	—	November 17, 2006	Mount Lemmon	Mount Lemmon Survey	·	1.5 km	MPC · JPL
552995	2010 XM_{46}	—	December 4, 2010	Kislovodsk Mtn.	Romas, E. S.	·	1.0 km	MPC · JPL
552996	2010 XR_{46}	—	December 5, 2010	Kitt Peak	Spacewatch	·	1.5 km	MPC · JPL
552997	2010 XE_{49}	—	December 6, 2010	Mount Lemmon	Mount Lemmon Survey	·	1.9 km	MPC · JPL
552998	2010 XL_{49}	—	November 14, 2010	La Sagra	OAM	HNS	1.3 km	MPC · JPL
552999	2010 XQ_{50}	—	May 8, 2008	Kitt Peak	Spacewatch	·	1.5 km	MPC · JPL
553000	2010 XB_{54}	—	December 6, 2010	Mount Lemmon	Mount Lemmon Survey	·	1.6 km	MPC · JPL

back to top

== Meaning of names ==
As minor planet discoveries are confirmed, they are given a permanent number by the IAU's Minor Planet Center (MPC), and the discoverers can then submit names for them, following the IAU's naming conventions. The list below concerns those minor planets in the specified number-range that have received names, and explains the meanings of those names.

Official naming citations of newly named small Solar System bodies are approved and published in a bulletin by IAU's Working Group for Small Bodies Nomenclature (WGSBN). Before May 2021, citations were published in MPC's Minor Planet Circulars for many decades. Recent citations can also be found on the JPL Small-Body Database (SBDB). Until his death in 2016, German astronomer Lutz D. Schmadel compiled these citations into the Dictionary of Minor Planet Names (DMP) and regularly updated the collection.

Based on Paul Herget's The Names of the Minor Planets, Schmadel also researched the unclear origin of numerous asteroids, most of which had been named prior to World War II. This article incorporates text from this source, which is in the public domain: SBDB New namings may only be added to this list below after official publication as the preannouncement of names is condemned. The WGSBN publishes a comprehensive guideline for the naming rules of non-cometary small Solar System bodies.

Named minor planet	Provisional	This minor planet was named for...	Ref · Catalog
552385 Rochechouart	2013 YU_{18}	Rochechouart is a commune in the Haute-Vienne department in the Nouvelle-Aquitaine region of France, about 40 km west of Limoges. It is well known for the presence of the Rochechouart-Chassenon astrobleme, an ancient 20-km diameter crater caused by an impact about 207 million years ago.	IAU · 552385
552420 Flodubeyjames	2013 YG_{82}	Florence Amy Jayne Dubey-James (born 2012), the granddaughter of the asteroid's discoverer.	IAU · 552420
552681 Sósvera	2010 JY_{210}	Vera T. Sós (1930–2023) was a Hungarian mathematician, university professor and a member of the Hungarian Academy of Sciences. Her research interests included number theory, combinatorics and mathematical analysis. Her famous result is the Erdős-Rényi-Sós friendship theorem in graph theory.	IAU · 552681
552708 Ödmangovender	2010 NU_{119}	Carolina Ödman-Govender (1974–2022), a Swiss physicist.	IAU · 552708
552727 Hauszmann	2010 RQ_{11}	Alajos Hauszmann (1847–1926), a Hungarian architect, university professor and member of the Hungarian Academy of Sciences.	IAU · 552727
552733 Grétsylászló	2010 RY_{43}	László Grétsy (1932–2024), a Hungarian linguist, university professor, television personality, and a prominent figure in language education.	IAU · 552733
552746 Annanobili	2010 RN_{154}	Anna Maria Nobili (born 1949) is an Italian physicist at the University of Pisa. Her research includes the dynamics of the Solar System and space physics.	IAU · 552746
552748 Garasdezső	2010 RN_{164}	Dezső Garas (1934–2011), a Hungarian actor and stage director.	IAU · 552748
552750 Valasek	2010 RW_{173}	Ferenc Valasek (1858–1917), a Hungarian master fisherman.	IAU · 552750
552784 Jeanbrahier	2010 TP_{38}	Jean Brahier (1917–1996), discoverer's grandfather, who was a carpenter in Lajoux, France.	IAU · 552784
552847 Steinaurél	2010 UZ_{29}	Marc Aurél Stein (1862–1943), Hungarian-born British archaeologist, ethnographer, geographer, linguist and surveyor.	IAU · 552847
552855 Hoitsy	2010 UZ_{63}	Pál Hoitsy (1850–1927), Hungarian newspaper writer, astronomer and high school teacher.	IAU · 552855
552888 Felixrodriguez	2010 VA_{83}	Félix Rodríguez de la Fuente (1928–1980) was a Spanish naturalist and pioneer of environmental awareness in Spain, who made TV documentaries for RTVE such as the series El hombre y la Tierra (Man and the Earth).	IAU · 552888
