= Andrea Milani (mathematician) =

Italian mathematician and astronomer

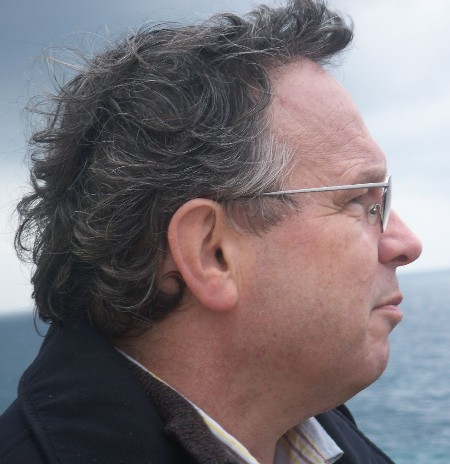

Andrea Milani Comparetti (Florence, 19 June 1948 – Pisa, 28 November 2018) was an Italian mathematician and astronomer, based at the University of Pisa.

== Biography ==
Andrea Milani Comparetti was born in Florence, in 1948. His father, Adriano Milani Comparetti, was a pioneer in child neuro-psychiatric rehabilitation, and his uncle was Don Lorenzo Milani. In 1970 he graduated in mathematics at the University of Milan, and later he studied at the Scuola Normale Superiore di Pisa. He then became a Full Professor of Mathematical Physics at the Department of Mathematics of the University of Pisa.

He died on November 28, 2018, of a sudden illness, causing a deep loss in the scientific community.

== Career ==
His areas of research included the $N$-body problem, the stability of the Solar System, asteroid dynamics, asteroid families, satellite geodesy, planetary exploration, orbit determination and asteroid impact risk assessment. He is the founder of the two web services NEODyS and AstDyS, dedicated to providing general information on all known asteroids. Furthermore, he was the developer, together with his collaborators over the years, of the software suite OrbFit.

He was a member of SIMCA (Italian Society of Celestial Mechanics and Astrodynamics) and of the International Astronomical Union, where he occupied over eight different positions under several Commissions and Divisions: he was the President of Commission on “Celestial Mechanics & Dynamical Astronomy” (2003-2006), the Secretary of Commission for “Positions & Motions of Minor Planets, Comets & Satellites” (2012-2015), and the first President of the Cross-Division A-F Commission X2 “Solar System Ephemerides” (2015-2018). He also served as member of the Steering Committees of Divisions 1 and F. Among his hobbies, he enjoyed writing science fiction stories.

Milani co-authored a book with Anna Maria Nobili and Paolo Farinella on non-conservative forces on artificial satellites. More recently, he published a book with Giovanni Federico Gronchi on orbit determination and impact monitoring.

== Awards ==
In 2010 he received the Brouwer Award, awarded by the Division on Dynamical Astronomy of the American Astronomical Society. In 2016 he awarded the GAL Hassin prize.

The main-belt asteroid 4701 Milani has been named in his honour.
