= Anna Maria Nobili =

Italian astrophysicist

Anna Maria Nobili (born 1949) is an Italian physicist active in the field of gravitational physics. Her institution is Pisa University. She authored a number of papers on satellite dynamics and co-authored a book with Andrea Milani and Paolo Farinella on the orbital perturbations induced by non-gravitational forces. After having published several papers on celestial mechanics, also in collaboration with Clifford Will and E. Myles Standish, Nobili is now Principal Investigator of the Galileo Galilei (GG) experiment aimed to improve the accuracy of the equivalence principle lying at the foundation of general relativity and of other metric theories of gravity. Asteroid 552746 Annanobili, discovered by Yuri Ivascenko at the Andrushivka Astronomical Observatory in 2010, was named in her honour. The official naming citation was published by IAU's WGSBN on 20 September 2021.

== Bibliometric information ==
As of November 2013, according to the NASA ADS database, the h-index of A.M. Nobili is 17, with a total number of citations (self-citations excluded) equal to about 1000. Her tori index and riq index are 19.2 and 118, respectively.
