= Kozyrev =

Kozyrev (masculine, Russian: Козырев) or Kozyreva (feminine, Russian: Козыревa) is a Russian surname. Notable people with the surname include:

- Andrey Kozyrev (born 1951), Russian politician
- Lyubov Kozyreva (disambiguation), multiple people
- Nikolai Aleksandrovich Kozyrev (1908-1983), Soviet astronomer and astrophysicist
- Nikolai Ivanovich Kozyrev (1934-2021), Soviet and Russian diplomat
- Yuri Kozyrev (born 1963), Russian photojournalist
- Stanislav Kozyrev (born 1987), Russian footballer

== See also ==
- 2536 Kozyrev, main-belt asteroid
- Kozyrev (crater), lunar crater
