= Idelson =

Idelson may refer to:

People with the surname Idelson:

- Beba Idelson (1895-1975), Israeli politician
- Benjamin Idelson (1911-1972), Israeli architect
- Bill Idelson (1919-2007), American actor and scriptwriter
- Ivan Idelson (1959-1994), philosopher, engineer, therapist and mathematician
- Naum Idelson (1885–1951), Russian astronomer
- Vladimir Idelson (1858–1954), Russian banker

Other:

- Idel'son (crater), lunar crater named after Naum Idelson
- Idelson Pharmacy, landmark in the city of Taganrog

== See also ==
- Abraham Zevi Idelsohn (1882–1938), Jewish ethnologist
