= Grotrian (crater) =

Crater on the Moon

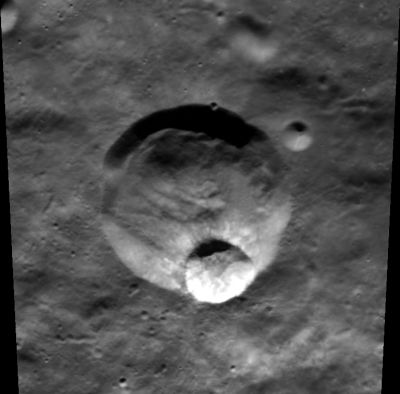
- Clementine mosaic
- Coordinates: 66.5°S 128.3°E
- Diameter: 37 km (23 mi)
- Depth: 4.04 km (2.51 mi)
- Colongitude: 233° at sunrise
- Eponym: Walter Grotrian

Grotrian is a lunar impact crater that is located on the southern hemisphere on the far side of the Moon. It lies to the north of the huge walled plain known as Schrödinger, within the radius of that formation's outer blanket of ejecta. The long Vallis Planck formation begins just to the north of Grotrian, and continues to the north-northwest towards Pikel'ner.

The outer wall of this crater forms a very nearly circular shape, with the smaller crater Hawke across the southern rim breaking up the symmetry. The interior surfaces form relatively smooth slopes that continue down to the material deposited across the bottom. Apart from Hawke and a small crater on the northern edge of the rim, this formation has not been significantly eroded by subsequent impacts.

== Satellite craters ==
By convention these features are identified on lunar maps by placing the letter on the side of the crater midpoint that is closest to Grotrian.

Grotrian	Latitude	Longitude	Diameter
X	64.5° S	125.5° E	20 km
