= Planck (crater) =

Lunar surface depression

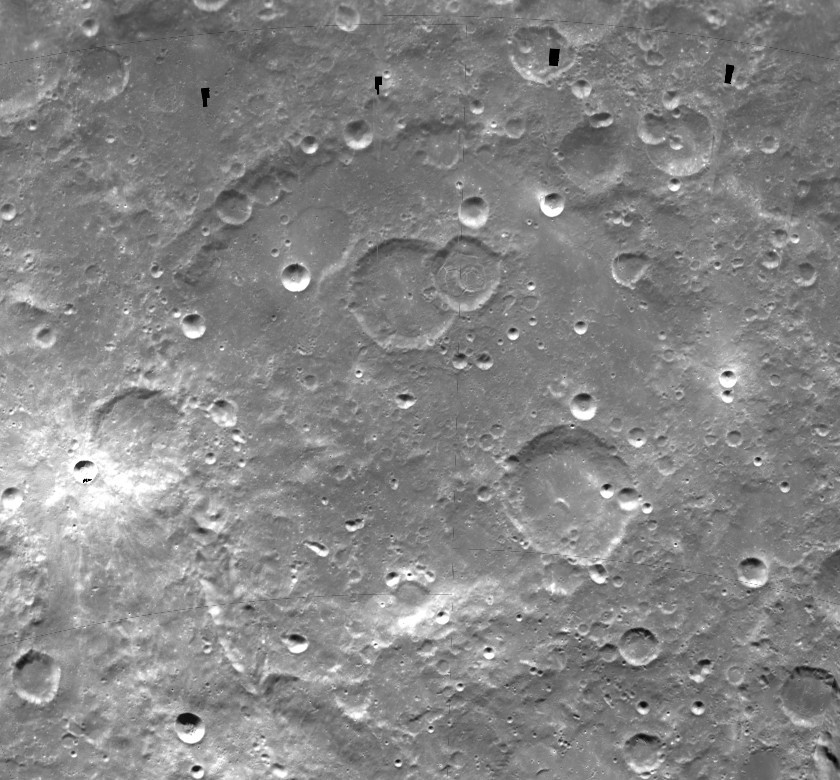
- Clementine mosaic
- Coordinates: 57.9°S 136.8°E
- Diameter: 319.46 km (198.50 mi)
- Depth: 4.00 km (2.49 mi)
- Colongitude: 234° at sunrise
- Formation: Pre-Nectarian
- Eponym: Max Planck

Planck is a large lunar impact crater, approximately 319 kilometers in diameter, that is located in the southern hemisphere of the Moon, on the far side as seen from the Earth. It lies to the west of the walled plain named Poincaré, another enormous formation only slightly larger than Planck. Lying across the southeast rim of Planck is the crater Prandtl, to the northeast is Hildegard, and to the west is Fechner. Planck is located within the South Pole–Aitken basin.

This crater is named after German physicist Max K. E. L. Planck (1858–1947).

== Description ==
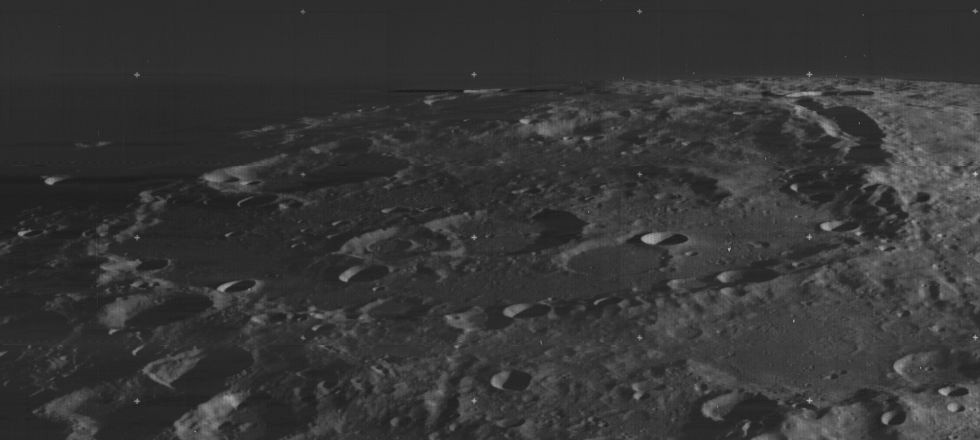
Oblique view from Lunar Orbiter 3, facing south

According to a 2012 study, Planck formed roughly 4.09 Ga (billion years) ago, partially resurfacing the area of the South Pole-Aitken basin that it impacted. It is a class of formation is known as a peak ring basin, which has a single interior topographic ring or a discontinuous ring of peaks with no central peak.

Like many lunar formations of this size, the outer rim has been damaged and eroded by lesser impacts, leaving a rugged ring of peaks and ridges that is notched and incised by small craters. The western rim of this walled plain is neatly overlain by a long lunar valley designated the Vallis Planck. Despite its name, however, this valley is actually radial to the walled plain Schrödinger to the south. The valley is approximately 503 kilometers in length.

The most notable feature on the interior floor of Planck is a multi-crater formation in the northern half consisting of Planck W, Planck Y, Planck Z, Planck B, and Planck A. The interior of Planck Y has been almost completely flooded by lava, leaving only a shallow perimeter. Likewise Planck Z has been flooded, although its rim is somewhat more prominent. The interior of Planck B is partly occupied by a concentric crater, and the floor contains several clefts. Parts of the remaining floor of Planck are level and smooth, at least in comparison with the surrounding terrain. This is particularly so in an arc along the northern inner wall. The southern half of the crater is somewhat more irregular, although still forming level plains in places. There are many small craters across the interior of Planck, and a few ghost-crater remnants.

== Satellite craters ==
By convention these features are identified on lunar maps by placing the letter on the side of the crater midpoint that is closest to Planck.

Planck	Latitude	Longitude	Diameter	Ref
A	54.7° S	137.3° E	18.55 km	WGPSN
B	56.0° S	137.4° E	44.88 km	WGPSN
C	53.4° S	141.3° E	43.74 km	WGPSN
J	62.9° S	145.3° E	25.21 km	WGPSN
K	65.0° S	146.2° E	26.06 km	WGPSN
L	66.9° S	141.8° E	23.37 km	WGPSN
W	56.0° S	131.2° E	17.38 km	WGPSN
X	54.3° S	129.5° E	22.27 km	WGPSN
Y	55.0° S	132.0° E	40.75 km	WGPSN
Z	56.4° S	135.2° E	66.75 km	WGPSN

== See also ==
- 1069 Planckia, asteroid
