= Nefedʹev (crater) =

Lunar surface depression

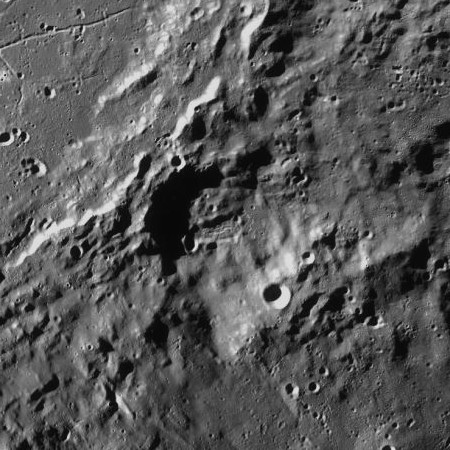
- LRO image. North is to upper left.
- Coordinates: 81.1°S 135.1°E
- Diameter: 40.2 km
- Eponym: Anatoly Nefedʹev

Nefedʹev is a lunar impact crater located on the lunar far side near the southern pole. The crater is located directly adjacent to the Schrödinger crater and East of craters Ganswindt and Idelʹson. Nefedʹev was adopted and named after Russian astronomer Anatoly Nefedʹev by the IAU in 2009.
