= Pikelner =

Pikelner may refer to:

- Solomon Pikelner (1921–1975), Soviet astronomer and physicist
  - 1975 Pikelner
  - Pikelʹner (crater), lunar impact crater
