= Hawke (crater) =

Lunar impact crater

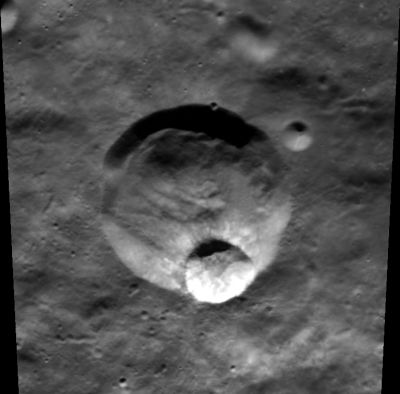
- Clementine mosaic of Grotrian, with Hawke below center
- Coordinates: 66.61°S 128.65°E
- Diameter: 13.2 km
- Depth: Unknown
- Colongitude: 233° at sunrise
- Eponym: Bernard Ray Hawke

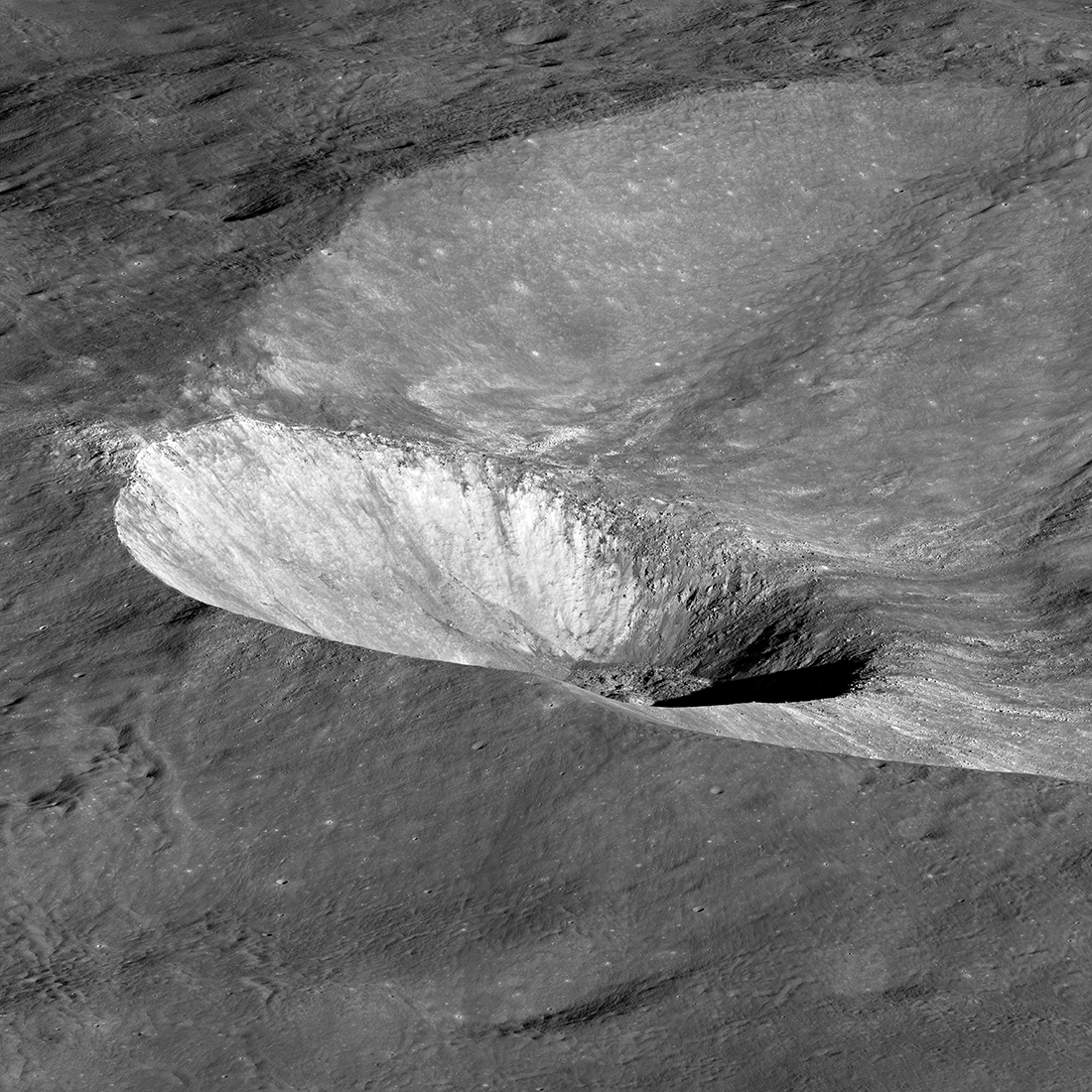
Oblique view of Hawke from LRO

Hawke is a lunar impact crater that is located on the southern hemisphere on the far side of the Moon. It lies within the larger Grotrian, located to the north of the huge walled plain called Schrödinger, within the radius of that formation's outer blanket of ejecta.

The crater's name was approved by the IAU on 16 March 2018. It is named after the American lunar scientist Bernard Ray Hawke (1946-2015).
