= Carver (crater) =

Lunar impact crater

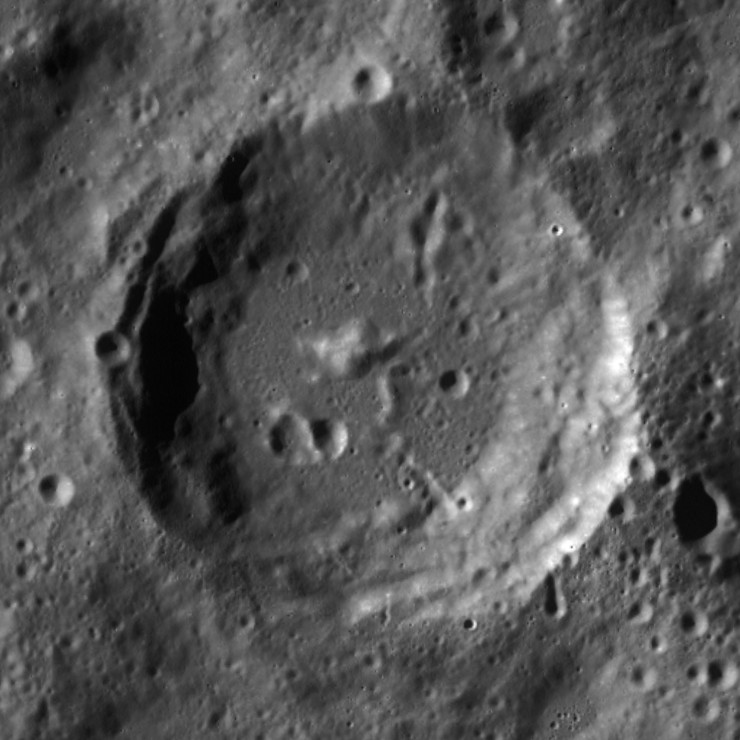
- LRO WAC image
- Coordinates: 43.0°S 126.9°E
- Diameter: 62.45 km (38.80 mi)
- Depth: Unknown
- Colongitude: 234° at sunrise
- Eponym: George W. Carver

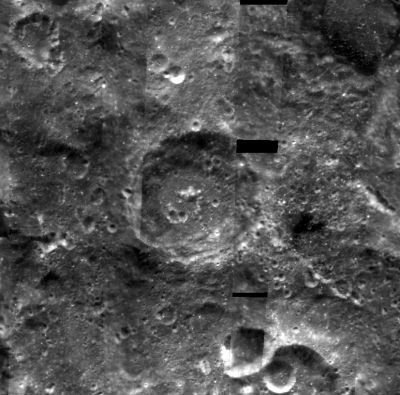
Clementine mosaic

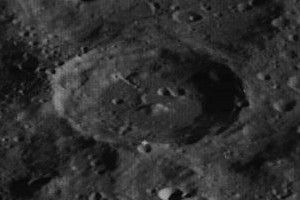
Oblique view from Lunar Orbiter 3, facing south

Carver is a lunar impact crater that is located on the far side of the Moon, due east of the walled plain Van der Waals. To the northeast is the crater Rosseland, and to the south-southeast lies Kozyrev.

Despite some wear due to impacts, the wide inner wall of this crater still contains some terraces. There are several tiny craters along the rim edge and the inner walls, but no notable intersecting impacts. Carver overlies the north-northeast rim of the old, heavily worn Carver M. The interior floor of Carver contains a small central peak at the midpoint, and several small craterlets in the southern half. The remainder of the floor is relatively featureless, and has a diameter about half the diameter of the crater. The infrared spectrum of pure crystalline plagioclase has been identified on the central peak.

This feature is named after American agricultural scientist George W. Carver (c. 1864–1943). Its designation was officially adopted by the International Astronomical Union in 1970.

== Satellite craters ==
By convention these features are identified on lunar maps by placing the letter on the side of the crater midpoint that is closest to Carver.

Carver	Latitude	Longitude	Diameter
K	46.2° S	128.5° E	60 km
L	45.2° S	127.8° E	33 km
M	45.0° S	126.8° E	76 km
