= Prandtl (crater) =

Lunar surface depression

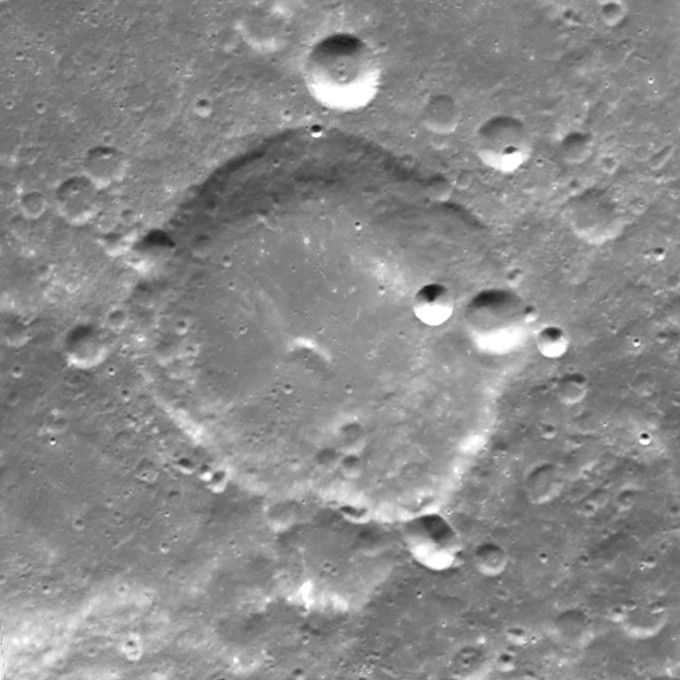
- Clementine mosaic
- Coordinates: 60.1°S 141.8°E
- Diameter: 91 km
- Depth: Unknown
- Colongitude: 217° at sunrise
- Formation: Nectarian
- Eponym: Ludwig Prandtl

Prandtl is an impact crater on the far side of the Moon. It lies across the southeastern outer rim of the huge walled plain Planck.

On the lunar geologic timescale, Prandtl dates to the Nectarian period. This crater is roughly circular, but with an outward bulge to the south-southeast. The rim is worn but still retains a well-defined edge. Several small craterlets lie along the rim and inner wall, the most notable being a pair of small craters along the eastern side and a small, eroded crater intruding slightly along the south. The interior floor is generally level, with only a small rise to the south of the midpoint. There is a cluster of three small craterlets along the southern inner wall.
