= VDW =

VDW can refer to one of the following:

- Van der Waals:
  - Johannes Diderik van der Waals, a Dutch physicist and thermodynamicist
  - the van der Waals force
  - the van der Waals equation
  - the van der Waals radius
  - Van der Waals (crater)
- Federation of German Scientists (Vereinigung Deutscher Wissenschaftler)
- Verbond tot Democratisering der Weermacht, a Dutch political party
- VDW (TV station), a digital television station in Western Australia
