= Fechner (crater) =

Lunar surface depression

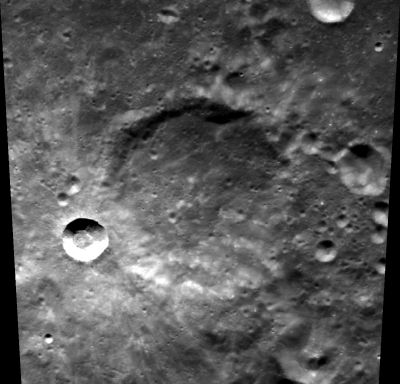
- Clementine mosaic with Fechner at center. Fechner T is the small bright crater at left.
- Coordinates: 59.0°S 124.9°E
- Diameter: 59.32 km (36.86 mi)
- Depth: Unknown
- Colongitude: 237° at sunrise
- Eponym: Gustav T. Fechner

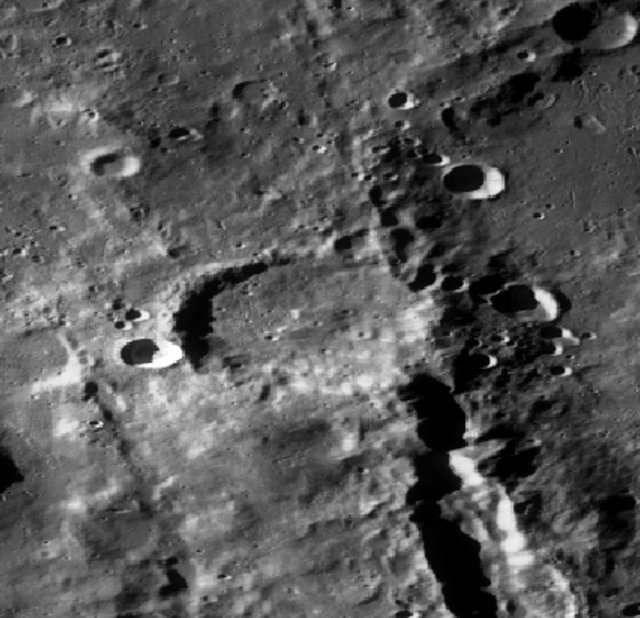
Vallis Planck was disrupted by the Fechner crater impact

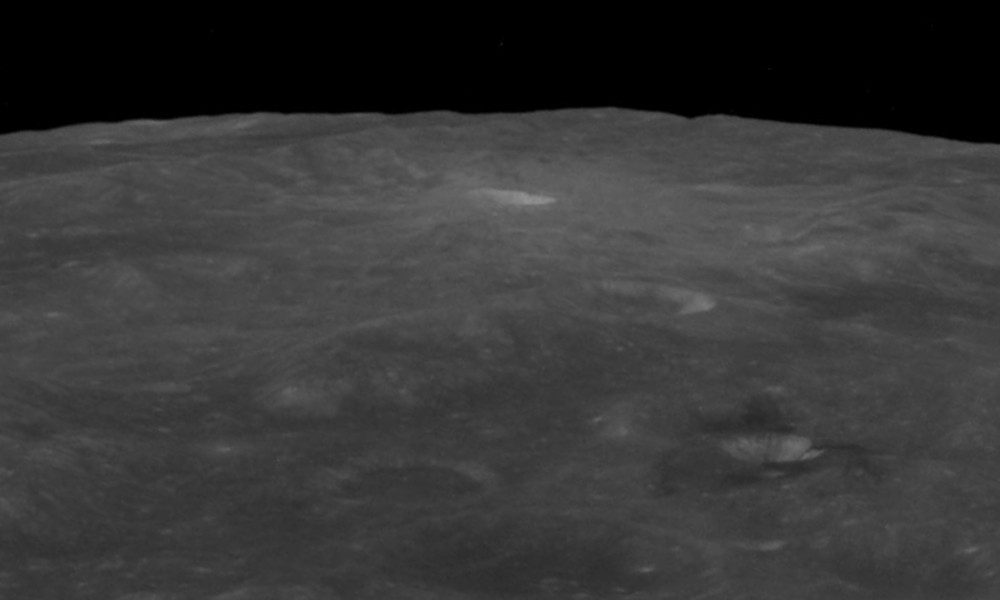
Apollo 8 photographed Fechner from a distance. Fechner T is the bright crater above center.

Fechner is a lunar impact crater that lies on the far side of the Moon's southern hemisphere, attached to the western rim of a large walled plain named Planck. The eastern rim of Fechner intersects the Vallis Planck, a long, wide cleft in the surface that follows a course to the north-northwest. This valley intrudes into the southeastern rim of the crater, then continues northwards from the periphery of the northeast rim.

Attached to the western rim of Fechner is Fechner T, a small, bowl-shaped crater with a relatively high albedo ray system. This satellite crater is surrounded by a blanket of light-hued ejecta that spills across the southwestern half of Fechner's interior floor. The crater rim of Fechner is relatively worn and eroded, with the eastern half of the rim reshaped due to the valley and proximity to Planck. The interior floor is marked by several small craters.

The crater is named after Gustav Theodor Fechner, a German physicist, psychologist, and philosopher (1801-1887). The name was formally adopted by the International Astronomical Union in 1970.

== Satellite craters ==
By convention these features are identified on lunar maps by placing the letter on the side of the crater midpoint that is closest to Fechner.

Fechner	Latitude	Longitude	Diameter
T	59.1° S	122.9° E	14 km

The fresh crater Fechner T is less than 150 million years old and so dates to the Copernican period of the lunar geologic timescale.
