= 1069 Planckia =

Background asteroid

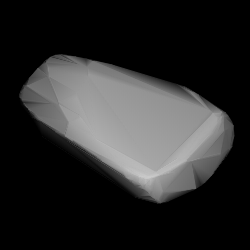
- Shape model of Planckia from its lightcurve

Discovery
- Discovered by: M. F. Wolf
- Discovery site: Heidelberg Obs.
- Discovery date: 28 January 1927

Designations
- Named after: Max Planck (German physicist)
- Alternative designations: 1927 BC · 1952 QY; 1975 VG_{8}
- Minor planet category: main-belt · (outer) background

Orbital characteristics
- Epoch 4 September 2017 (JD 2458000.5)
- Uncertainty parameter 0
- Observation arc: 90.75 yr (33,147 d)
- Aphelion: 3.4721 AU
- Perihelion: 2.7809 AU
- Semi-major axis: 3.1265 AU
- Eccentricity: 0.1105
- Orbital period (sidereal): 5.53 yr (2,019 days)
- Mean anomaly: 76.394°
- Mean motion: 0° 10^{m} 41.88^{s} / day
- Inclination: 13.563°
- Longitude of ascending node: 142.38°
- Argument of perihelion: 31.794°

Physical characteristics
- Dimensions: 35.657±0.680 km 39.17±1.40 km 39.35 km (derived); 39.50±2.1 km 43.675±0.859 km 44.34±1.28 km
- Synodic rotation period: 8.643±0.05 h 8.655±0.001 h 8.66±0.05 h 8.665±0.005 h (Note: Lightcurve plot of 1069 Planckia, Palmer Divide Observatory, Brian D. Warner (2010). Summary figures at the LCDB); 10.58±0.05 h
- Geometric albedo: 0.1771±0.0206; 0.179±0.011; 0.1982 (derived); 0.2158±0.025; 0.219±0.037
- Spectral type: SMASS = S
- Absolute magnitude (H): 9.30 · 9.4

1069 Planckia, provisional designation 1927 BC, is a background asteroid from the outer regions of the asteroid belt, approximately 39 kilometers (24 miles) in diameter. It was discovered on 28 January 1927, by astronomer Max Wolf at the Heidelberg-Königstuhl State Observatory in Germany. The asteroid was named after German physicist Max Planck.

== Orbit and classification ==
Planckia is a non-family asteroid from the main belt's background population. It orbits the Sun in the outer main-belt at a distance of 2.8–3.5 AU once every 5 years and 6 months (2,019 days; semi-major axis of 3.13 AU). Its orbit has an eccentricity of 0.11 and an inclination of 14° with respect to the ecliptic. The body's observation arc begins at Heidelberg in February 1927, or 10 days after its official discovery observation.

== Naming ==
This minor planet was named after noted German physicist Max Planck (1858–1947), on the commemoration of his 80th birthday. He was a professor of physics at Berlin University and the founder of quantum mechanics. In 1918, he received the Nobel prize in Physics. The official naming citation was mentioned in The Names of the Minor Planets by Paul Herget in 1955 (H 101). He is also honored by a lunar crater Planck.

== Physical characteristics ==
In the SMASS classification, Planckia is a common, stony S-type asteroid.

=== Rotation period ===
Between 2000 and 2010, several rotational lightcurves of Planckia were obtained from photometric observations by Brian Warner, Jérôme Caron and René Roy (U=2/3/3/2/2-). Lightcurve analysis gave a consolidated rotation period of 8.665 hours with a brightness amplitude between 0.14 and 0.42 magnitude.

=== Diameter and albedo ===
According to the surveys carried out by the Infrared Astronomical Satellite IRAS, the Japanese Akari satellite and the NEOWISE mission of NASA's Wide-field Infrared Survey Explorer, Planckia measures between 35.657 and 44.34 kilometers in diameter and its surface has an albedo between 0.1771 and 0.219.

The Collaborative Asteroid Lightcurve Link derives an albedo of 0.1982 and a diameter of 39.35 kilometers based on an absolute magnitude of 9.4.
