= Kozyrev (crater) =

Crater on the Moon

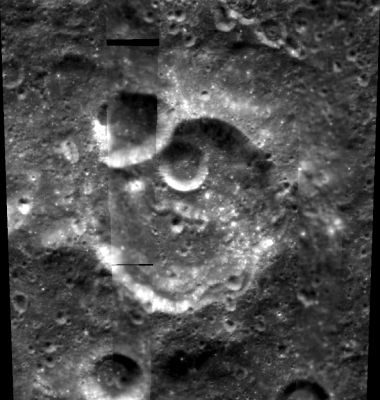
- Clementine mosaic
- Coordinates: 46.8°S 129.3°E
- Diameter: 65 km
- Depth: Unknown
- Colongitude: 231° at sunrise
- Eponym: Nikolay A. Kozyrev

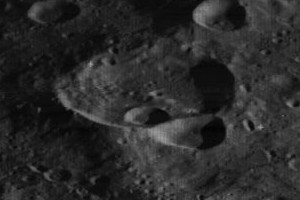
Oblique view from Lunar Orbiter 3, facing south

Kozyrev is an impact crater on the far side of the Moon. It lies to the south-southeast of the crater Carver, and to the southwest of the Roche–Pauli crater pair.

This is an eroded crater formation, although most of the outer rim remains well-defined. There is a small, slightly skewed crater laid across the north-northwestern rim. Attached to the southeast of this feature in the northern part of Kozyrev's interior floor is a smaller, bowl-shaped crater. The remainder of the interior is marked only by tiny craterlets. The inner wall is slightly wider along the eastern side than elsewhere.

== Namesake ==
Kozyrev was named after the Russian astrophysicist Nikolai Aleksandrovich Kozyrev.

Regarded as the most promising Russian astronomer of his time, Kozyrev fell victim to the Stalinist purges, spending 10 years in Gulags. As a result of his imprisonment he was mentioned in The Gulag Archipelago by Alexandr Solzhenitsyn.
