= Idelson Pharmacy =

Landmark in Taganrog, Rostov Region, Russia

- Аптека Идельсона (Russian)
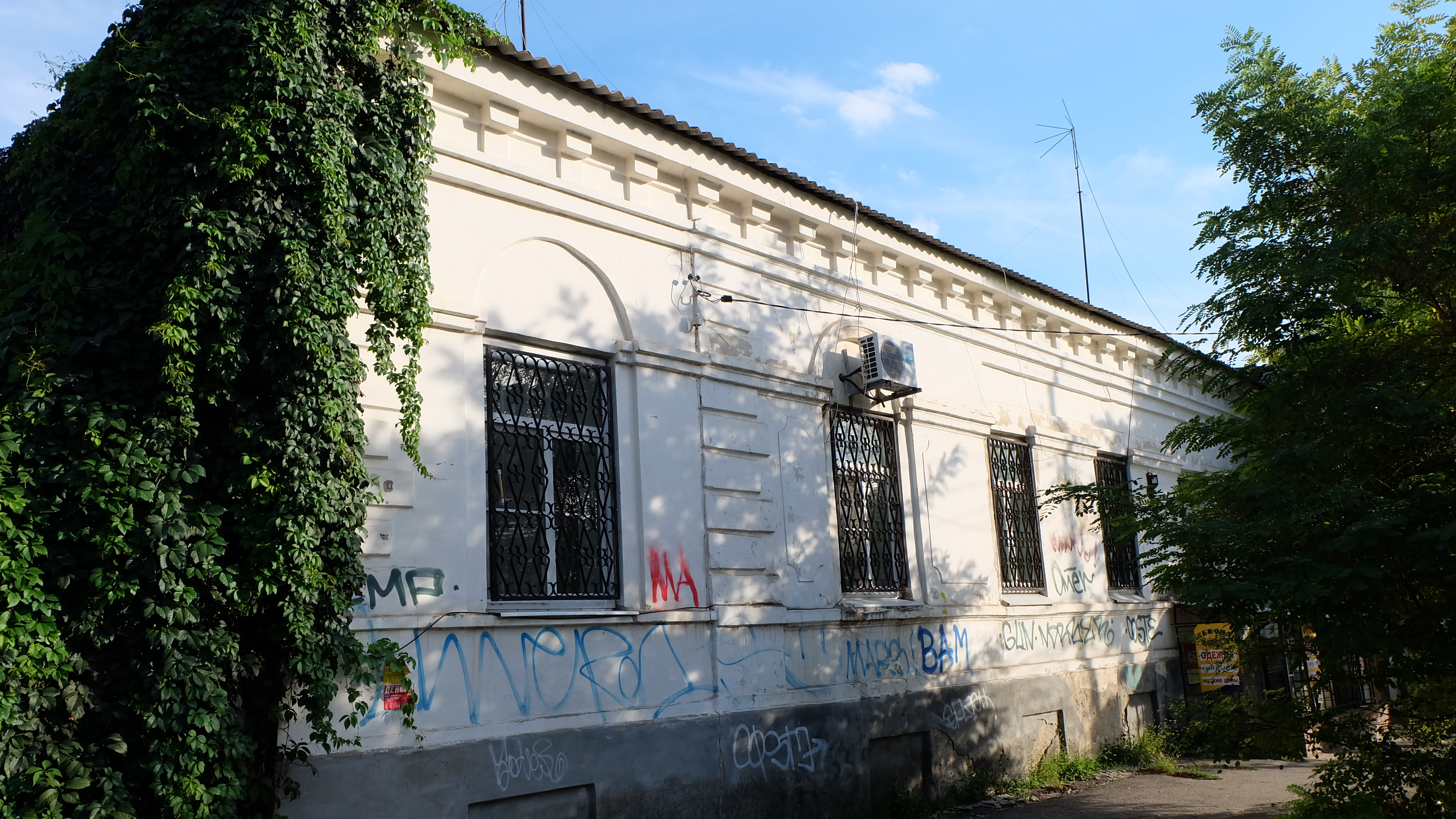
- Pharmacy

- Location within Russia
- Location: Krasny Pereulok,23, Taganrog, Rostov oblast, Russia

History
- Built: 1884

Site notes
- Owner: R. B. Idelson

The Idelson Pharmacy (Russian: Аптека Идельсона) is a landmark in the city of Taganrog, Rostov Region, Russia, located in Krasny Pereulok 23. The modern name is Pharmacy No.53. According to Decision No.301 of 18 November 1992, the house where Idelson's pharmacy was located recognized as an object of the cultural heritage of the regional values.

== History ==
In the beginning, Ruvim (Robert) Borisovich Idelson rented a room on the modern Chekhov Street for the location of his pharmacy. Then, to develop his own business, he bought a two-story house with the same pharmacy on the first floor in 1884. Over time, Idelson's pharmacy became the best in the city of Taganrog. Until now, the image of the label from the pharmacy of Idelson has been preserved.

The nationalization of the pharmacy took place on 20 June 1920. 9 people worked in the pharmacy room, I. B. Nankin was appointed to the post of the head pharmacist. The house became known as pharmacy No. 53 and continued its work. Since the late 1980s is a part of GPP "Pharmacy".

== Family of pharmacist ==
- Son - Vladimir Robertovich Idelson (1881), Russian lawyer, author of monographs "Insurance Law" (1907) and "Credit, Banks and Exchange: Lectures read to students of the economic department of St. Petersburg Polytechnic Institute of Emperor Peter the Great in 1913 -14 years "(1914). Emigrated to England, naturalised as a British citizen in 1930 and became the first Russian admitted to the English Bar
- Daughter - Roza Robertovna Idelson, published plays in the periodicals of Taganrog, the wife of the surgeon and Hero of Labor V.V. Zak.
- The children of his cousin are writers E. Ya. Tarakhovskaya, S. Ya. Parnok and V. Ya. Parnakh.

== Description ==
Elements that were created to decorate the facade, were located without a certain symmetry. These were bas-reliefs, lancet windows, thin columns. The exterior of the house was made in a style similar to Gothic.

== Links ==
- Аптека Р. Б. Идельсона
- О тебе, любимый город: аптека Идельсона
