= Vallis Planck =

Lunar surface depression

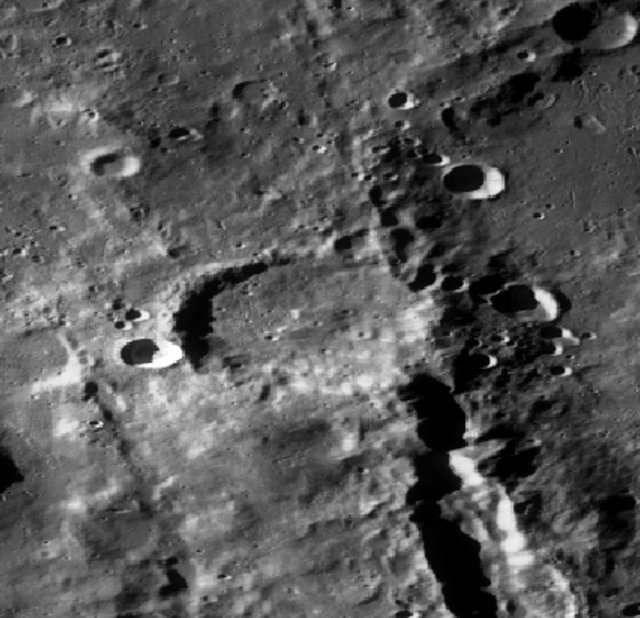
Vallis Planck disrupted by the Fechner crater

Vallis Planck is a long, linear valley located on the far side of the Moon. It is oriented radially to the huge Schrödinger basin, and was most likely formed by that impact. The selenographic coordinates of this feature are 58.4°S 126.1°E, and it has a length of 502.90 km (312.49 mi). The cleft has a width of around 27 km (17 mi) wide and is 3.5 km (2.2 mi) deep. A ray of secondary craters extends further to a total length of 860 km (530 mi).

== Description ==
This cleft in the surface crosses the western part of the huge walled plain called Planck, and it was named after that feature (which has an eponym of Max Planck). The southern edge closest to Schrödinger begins near the northeastern outer rampart of the crater Grotrian. It then continues to the north-northwest, where it suffers a disruption where it was overlain by the crater Fechner. The remainder of the feature continues to the northwestern outer rim of the walled plain Planck, until terminating near Pikel'ner K.
