= Ganswindt (crater) =

Lunar surface depression

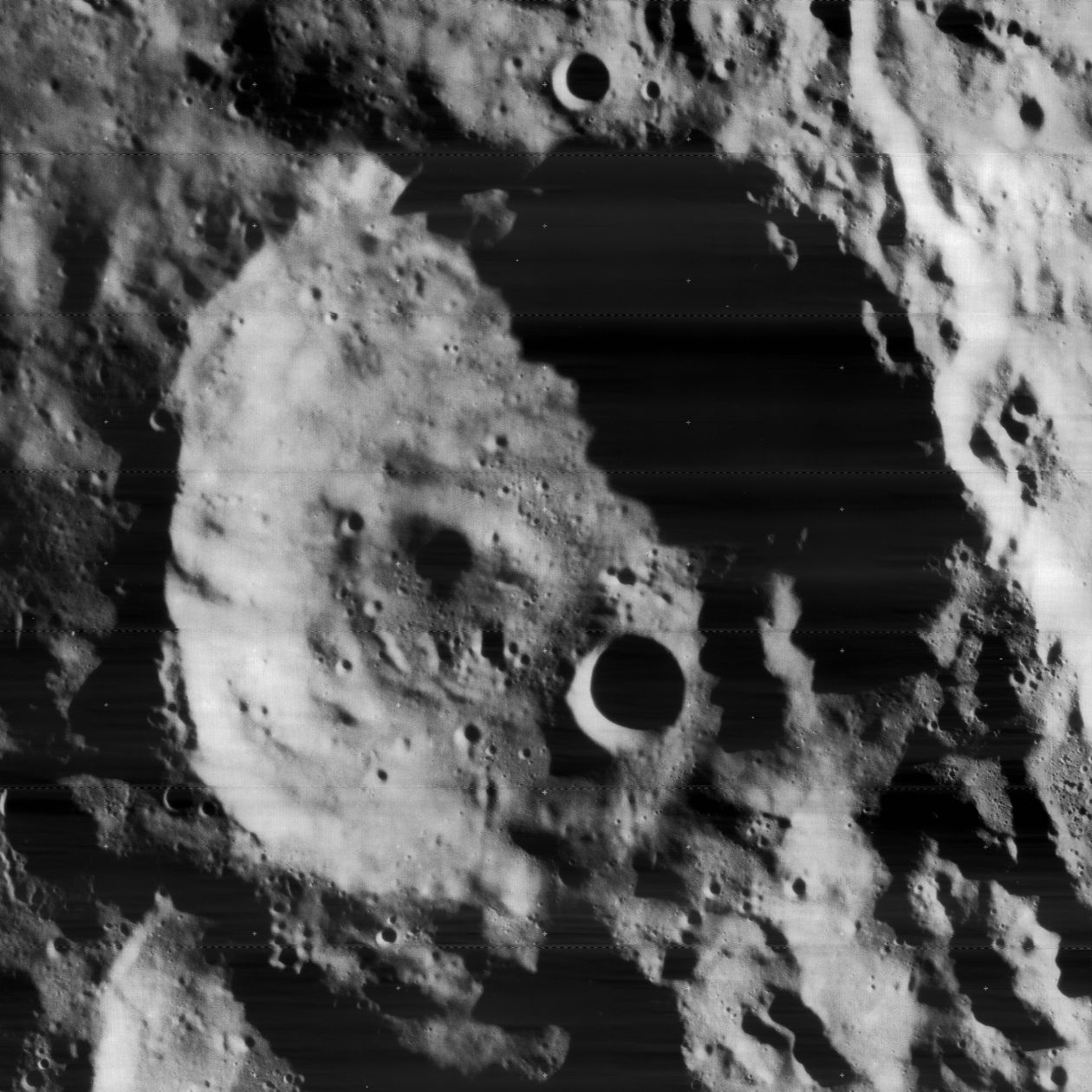
- Lunar Orbiter 4 image
- Coordinates: 79.6°S 110.3°E
- Diameter: 77.52 km (48.17 mi)
- Depth: Unknown
- Colongitude: 256° at sunrise
- Eponym: Hermann Ganswindt

Ganswindt is a lunar impact crater that lies near the southern pole of the Moon's far side. It is attached to the southwestern exterior of Schrödinger, a huge walled plain, and forms part of the 355-km diameter Amundsen-Ganswindt basin. Ganswindt partly overlies the smaller crater Idel'son to the south.

The rim of Gandswindt is roughly circular but somewhat irregular, particularly at the southern edge. Much of the interior floor is covered in uneven ridges, and there is a small crater in the southeastern section. Because sunlight enters the interior at a low angle, the northern part of the floor is almost always covered in shadow, concealing the terrain in that section of the crater.

The crater is named in honor of German rocketry engineer Hermann Ganswindt (1856-1934), the aviation pioneer who first proposed reaction vehicles for space travel in 1881. He also proposed time as a fourth dimension. Its designation was officially adopted by the International Astronomical Union in 1970.
