= Lyubov Kozyreva =

Lyubov Kozyreva may refer to:

- Lyubov Kozyreva (cross-country skier) (1929–2015), former Soviet cross-country skier
- Lyubov Kozyreva (volleyball) (born 1956), former volleyball player for the USSR
