= Pikelʹner (crater) =

Lunar surface depression

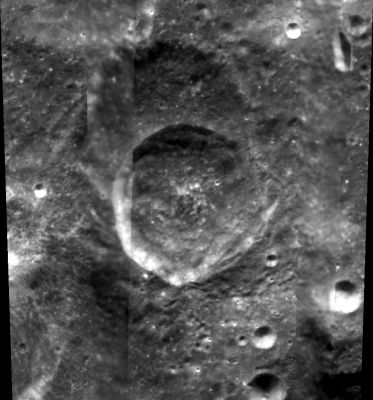
- Clementine mosaic
- Coordinates: 47.9°S 123.3°E
- Diameter: 47 km
- Depth: Unknown
- Colongitude: 237° at sunrise
- Eponym: Solomon B. Pikelner

Pikelʹner is an impact crater on the Moon's far side, named for the Russian astronomer Solomon Pikelner. It lies to the southeast of the larger crater Van der Waals, and to the north of the Vallis Planck cleft. Pikelʹner overlies more than half of the satellite crater Pikelʹner Y to the north. Almost contacting the southwestern outer rim of Pikelʹner is a larger concentric crater formation with the smaller crater of the pair, Pikelʹner S, along the northern edge of the pair.

The outer rim of Pikelʹner is well-defined with little erosion, giving it the appearance of a relatively young feature. The interior floor is somewhat uneven, possibly due to deposits of ejecta or fall-back material. It is free of impacts of note within the interior.

== Satellite craters ==
By convention these features are identified on lunar maps by placing the letter on the side of the crater midpoint that is closest to Pikelʹner.

Pikelʹner	Latitude	Longitude	Diameter
F	48.0° S	127.6° E	30 km
G	49.1° S	128.3° E	24 km
K	50.3° S	124.8° E	36 km
S	48.7° S	120.2° E	62 km
Y	47.4° S	123.1° E	52 km
