= Vladimir Idelson =

British QC

Vladimir Robert Idelson (1881, Rostov-on-Don-1954) was a Jewish lawyer and political activist in both Russia and London. He was active as a zionist in the Kadimah student association whilst a student in Kharkov.

Ivan Idelson was his second son.

== Texts ==
- 1944: Vladimir R. Idelson, ‘The Law of Nations and the Individual’ Transactions of the Grotius Society 30, 50-66
