= Idelʹson (crater) =

Lunar surface depression

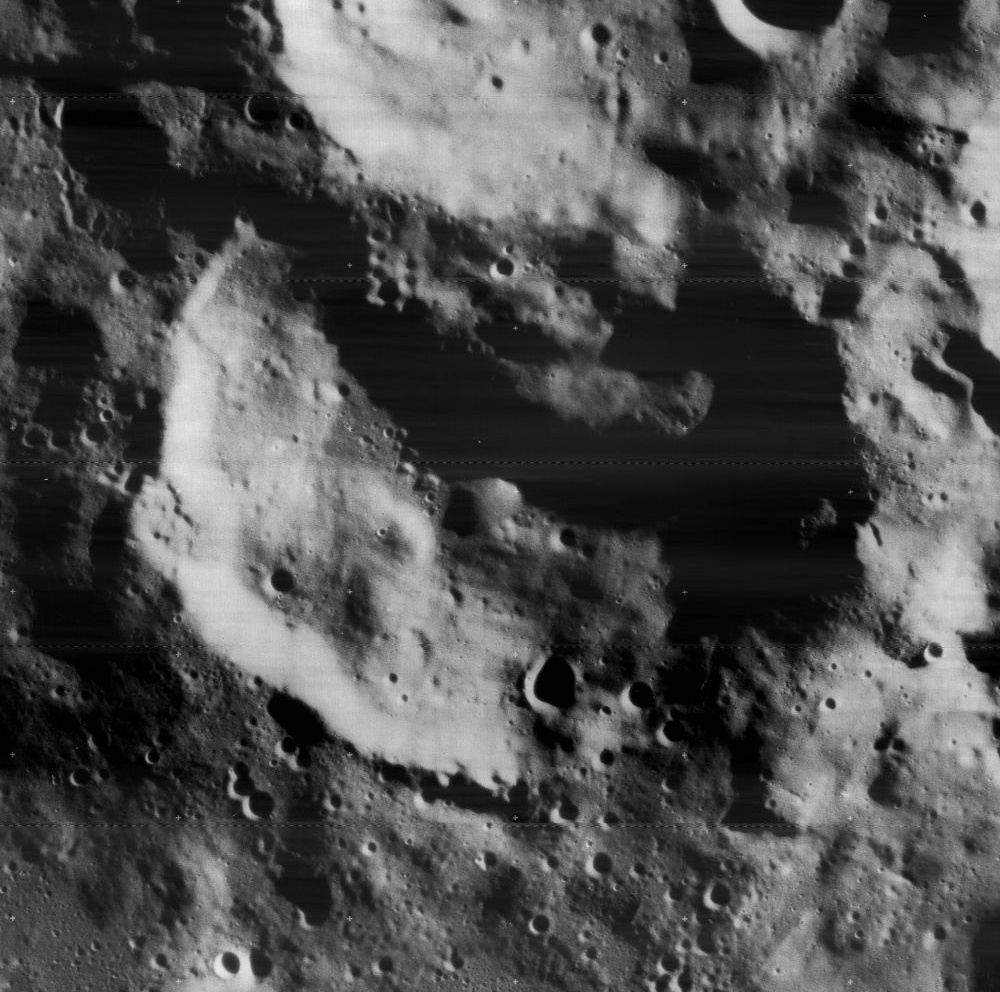
- Lunar Orbiter 4 image
- Coordinates: 81.5°S 110.9°E
- Diameter: 60 km
- Depth: 2.83 km (1.76 mi)
- Colongitude: 245° at sunrise
- Eponym: Naum I. Idelʹson

Idelʹson is a lunar impact crater that is located on the far side of the Moon. It lies just behind the southern lunar limb, in a region that is sometimes brought into view of the Earth due to libration. Idel'son is situated to the southwest of a huge walled plain named Schrödinger.

The northern rim of Idelʹson is overlain by the larger crater Ganswindt, reversing the usual order of smaller craters on top of larger impacts usually seen on the Moon. The outer glacis of Ganswindt covers nearly half the interior floor of Idelʹson, reaching to the midpoint. The remainder of the interior and rim of the crater has been partly overlain by ejecta, producing a rounded, lumpy surface. Still the surviving outer rim remains distinct, and is not overlain by any other impacts of note. The largest impact within the interior is a tiny crater next to the southeastern inner wall.

== Satellite craters ==
By convention these features are identified on lunar maps by placing the letter on the side of the crater midpoint that is closest to Idelʹson.

| Idelʹson | Latitude | Longitude | Diameter |
|---|---|---|---|
| L | 84.2° S | 115.8° E | 28 km |
