= Van der Waals (crater) =

Crater on the Moon

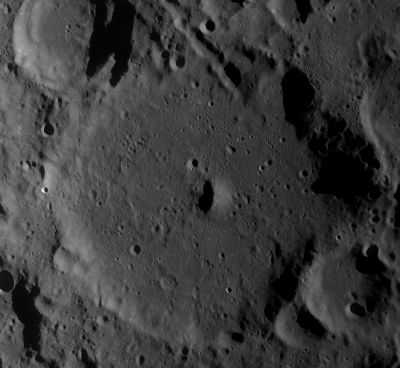
- LRO WAC image
- Coordinates: 43.9°S 119.9°E
- Diameter: 104 km
- Depth: Unknown
- Colongitude: 242° at sunrise
- Eponym: Johannes Diderik van der Waals

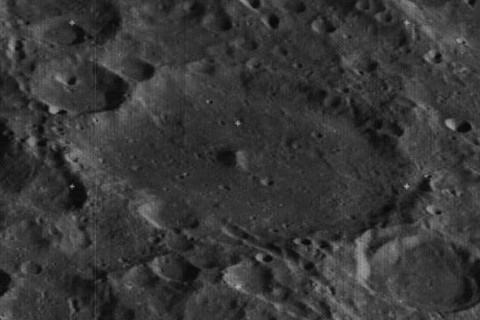
Oblique view from Lunar Orbiter 3, facing south

Van der Waals is a lunar impact crater on the far side of the Moon. It is a heavily eroded feature with an irregular outer rim. The edge is lowest along the southern side where it is little more than a circular crest along the ground. It is more developed along the northern side, but the rim is notched and rugged. The satellite crater Van der Waals W is attached to the exterior of the northeast, and Van der Waals H intrudes into the rim along the southeast. The interior floor is relatively even and featureless, with only a few tiny craterlets to mark the surface.

Nearby craters of note include Clark to the north, Carver to the east, and Pikel'ner to the southeast. About two crater diameters to the west-southwest is Lebedev.

== Satellite craters ==
By convention these features are identified on lunar maps by placing the letter on the side of the crater midpoint that is closest to Van der Waals.

Van der Waals	Latitude	Longitude	Diameter
B	41.0° S	121.0° E	17 km
C	40.5° S	123.6° E	24 km
H	44.3° S	121.7° E	31 km
K	45.8° S	122.0° E	55 km
W	41.3° S	117.1° E	46 km
