= Naum Idelson =

Soviet theoretical astronomer

Naum Ilyich Idelson (Russian: Наум Ильич Идельсон) (March 1(13), 1885, Saint Petersburg - July 14, 1951, Leningrad) was a Soviet theoretical astronomer and expert in history of physics and mathematics.

The crater Idelson on the Moon is named after him.

== Life ==
Naum Ilyich Idelson was born on March 13, 1885, to a mathematician who wanted his son to pursue a career in law. He studied at Saint Petersburg State University and graduated with a degree in mathematics and law in 1909. He worked as a lawyer for a short time, and then began teaching mathematics in high school.

In 1918, Idelson received a position in the Computing Department of the P. F. Lesgaft Institute, then headed by N. A. Morozov. In this department, he worked on tables of solar eclipses for the chronology of Russian history.

In 1919, the State Calculation Institute was founded, and Idelson was appointed head of the group compiling astronomical almanac. In 1923, it merged with the Astronomical-Geodetic Institute, forming the Leningrad Astronomical Institute. Idelson became the director of the institute and assistant to B. V. Numerov.

In 1920, Idelson also worked in the Pulkovo Observatory, teaching mathematics, mechanics and geophysics. In 1926 he also worked in the Leningrad university, and from 1933 he was a professor of astronomy. He received his doctorate there in 1936.

During the great Stalinist terror, he was arrested on February 10, 1937, but eventually, with a rare exception, he was acquitted, which allowed him to resume his scientific activities in 1939.
