= Solomon Pikelner =

Soviet astronomer and physicist (1921–1975)

Solomon Borisovich Pikelner (Russian: Соломон Борисович Пикельнер; February 6, 1921 – November 19, 1975) was a Soviet astronomer who made a significant contribution to the theory of the interstellar medium, solar plasma physics, stellar atmospheres, and magnetohydrodynamics. He was professor of astronomy at Moscow State University starting in 1959. The crater Pikelʹner on the Moon and asteroid 1975 Pikelner bear his name.
