= Nikolai Aleksandrovich Kozyrev =

Soviet astronomer and astrophysicist

Nikolai Kozyrev
- Николай Козырев
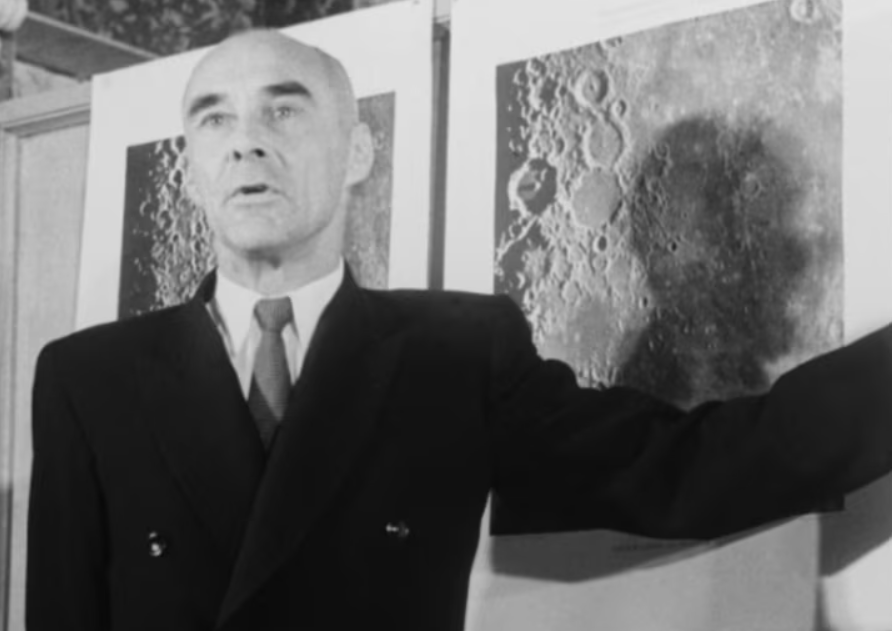
- Kozyrev in 1959
- Born: 2 September 1908; Saint Petersburg, Russian Empire
- Died: 27 February 1983 (aged 74); Leningrad, Russian SFSR, Soviet Union
- Scientific career
- Fields: Astrophysics

Nikolai Alexandrovich Kozyrev (Russian: Николай Александрович Козырев; 2 September 1908 – 27 February 1983) was a Soviet Russian astronomer and astrophysicist.

== Biography ==
Kozyrev was born in Saint Petersburg in 1908 and by 1928 graduated from Leningrad State University. In 1931 he began working at the Pulkovo Observatory, located to the south of Leningrad. He was considered to be one of the most promising astrophysicists in Russia. Kozyrev was a victim of the Stalinist purges of the Pulkovo Observatory. Started by the accusations of a disgruntled graduate student, most of the observatory staff died as a result. Kozyrev was arrested in November 1936 and sentenced to 10 years for counterrevolutionary activity. In January 1941, he was given another 10-year sentence for "hostile propaganda". While incarcerated, he was allowed to work in engineering-type jobs. Due to the lobbying by his colleagues, he won an early release from detention in December 1946. As a result of his imprisonment he was mentioned in The Gulag Archipelago by Aleksandr Solzhenitsyn.

During his imprisonment, Kozyrev attempted to continue working on purely theoretical physics. He considered the problem of the energy source of stars and formulated a theory, but in his isolation, he was unaware of the discovery of nuclear energy. After his release, Kozyrev refused to believe the theory that stars are powered by nuclear fusion.

== Publications ==
He is most noted for his observation of the transient lunar phenomenon in the crater Alphonsus on the Moon. In 1958 he observed a patch of white within the crater, and a spectrum of the area appeared to reveal an emission cloud of carbon particles. Transient lunar phenomenon had long recorded what appeared to be temporary emissions on the lunar surface, and Kozyrev's observation was the first observation of the kind, and appeared to provide confirmation that the Moon was volcanically active.

In 1953, Kozyrev attempted to analyze the phenomenon of ashen light, a nocturnal air glow on Venus whose existence remains controversial to this day. He also made the earliest photometric measurements of the visible and ultraviolet spectrum of Venus. His calculation of the thermal balance of Venus disputed the popular theory that the clouds of Venus consisted of dust. Kozyrev argued that energy absorbed in the upper atmosphere created high altitude storms, but the surface of Venus would be still and dimly lit. This work influenced the theory of Venus and Nobel Laureate Harold Urey devoted a paper to the analysis and implications of it.

Kozyrev wrongly believed that the white poles of Mars were caused by cloud formations in the atmosphere, not ice on the surface.

Due to his experiments and publications (Causal Mechanics/Theory of Time) he became a controversial figure in Russian scientific community. In the 1930s, Kozyrev was considered the most promising new astrophysicist in Russia, but his arrest and long imprisonment destroyed his career during what is usually the most creative period of a scientist's life. Isolated from all news and publications, he pondered the source of internal heat in stars and planets, but was unaware of the discoveries being made in quantum mechanics and nuclear energy. After his release, he struggled to recover his place in science, but his own theories were out of step with the current physics by that time.

The dispute over Kozyrev's causal-mechanics theory spilled into Pravda in 1959, with criticism by some of the Soviet Union's leading physicists, including Igor Tamm. In January 1960, the Soviet Academy of Sciences and Bureau of Physico-Mathematical Sciences appointed a commission to resolve the dispute. The nine men were assigned to investigate the theory, experimental evidence, and the special issue of planetary asymmetry which Kozyrev claimed was evidence of a gyro-gravitational "latitude effect". Their findings were:

1. The theory is not based on accepted clearly formulated axiomatics, its conclusions are not developed by sufficiently strict logical or mathematical methods.
2. The quality and accuracy of conducted laboratory experiments do not allow drawing of specific conclusions about the nature of the effect.
3. Checking the asymmetric form of major planets by measuring their photographs, it was not found in Saturn. For Jupiter they arrived at the conclusion that the apparent asymmetry was the result of the asymmetric arrangement of bands on its disks but was not a geometrical asymmetry of the planet.

== Honors ==
In September 1969, the International Academy of Astronautics (IAA, Paris, France) awarded N. Kozyrev a nominal gold medal "For remarkable telescopic and spectral observations of luminescent phenomena on the Moon, showing that the Moon remains a still active body, and stimulating development of the methods of luminescent researches world wide."

In December 1969, the State Committee for Affairs of Discovery and Inventions at the Ministerial Council of the USSR, awarded N. Kozyrev a diploma "For the discovery of tectonic activity of the Moon."

The following astronomical features are named for him:

- Asteroid 2536 Kozyrev.
- Kozyrev (crater) on the Moon.

== Publications ==
- N.A. Kozyrev, Causal or asymmetric mechanics in linear approximation, Pulkovo, 1958 (text available (in Russian))
- N.A. Kozyrev, On the Nightglow of Venus, Izvestiya Krymskoi Astrofizicheskoi Observatorii, Vol 12
- N.A. Kozyrev, Molecular Absorption in the Violet Part of the Spectrum of Venus Krymskoi Astrofizicheskoi Observatorii, Vol 12
- N.A. Kozyrev, Selected Works, published by Leningrad State Univ., 1991. 488 p.
- N.A. Kozyrev, V.V. Nasonov, On some properties of time, discovered by astronomical observations, in Problemy issledovaniya vselennoi, 1980, (Russian lang.)
- N.A. Kozyrev, Possibility of experimental study of properties of time, Pulkovo, September 1967 (text available)
- N.A. Kozyrev. Sources of Stellar Energy and the Theory of the Internal Constitution of Stars, October 2005

== Publications with reference to Kozyrev's work ==
- Margerison T., Causal Mechanics - The Russian Scientific Dispute, New Scientists, London, Nov 26, 1959
- Akimov, A.E., Shipov, G. I., Torsion fields and their experimental manifestations, 1996 (HTML available)
- Mishin, Alexander M., The Ether Model as Result of the New Empirical Conception, International Academy of MegaSciences, St. Petersburg, Russia (html available)
- Levich, A.P., A Substantial Interpretation of N.A. Kozyrev's Conception of Time. Singapore, New Jersey, London, Hong Kong: World Scientific, 1996, pp. 1–42.
- A.E. Akimov, G.U. Kovalchuk, V.G. Medvedev, V.K. Oleinik, A.F. Pugach, The preliminary results of astronomical observations of the sky with N.A. Kozyrev's method, Chief astronomical observatory of the Ukrainian Academy of Sciences, Kyiv, 1992
- Hellmann, A., Aspekte der Zeit- und Äthertheorie, 2006, ()
- Lavrentiev, M.M., Yeganova, I.A., Lutset, M.K., Fominykh, S.F. (1990). On distant influence of stars on resistor. Doklady Physical Sciences. 314 (2). 368–370.
- Lavrentiev, M.M., Gusev, V.A., Yeganova, I.A., Lutset, M.K., Fominykh, S.F. (1990). On the registration of true Sun position. Doklady Physical Sciences. 315 (2), 368–370.
- Lavrentiev, M.M., Yeganova, I.A., Lutset, M.K., Fominykh, S.F. (1991) On the registration of substance respond to external irreversible process. Doklady Physical Sciences. 317 (3), 635–639.
- Lavrentiev, M.M., Yeganova, I.A., Medvedev, V.G., Oleynik, V.K., Fominykh, S.F. (1992). On the scanning of star sky by Kozyrev's detecting unit. Doklady Physical Sciences. 323 (4), 649–652.
- Levich, A.P. (1995). Generating Flows and a Substantional Model of Space-Time. Gravitation and Cosmology. 1 (3), 237–242.
- Wilcock, David. (2011). The Source Field Investigations,

== See also ==
- Time in physics
- K-Space (band)
