= Schrödinger (crater) =

Large lunar impact crater of the form traditionally called a walled plain

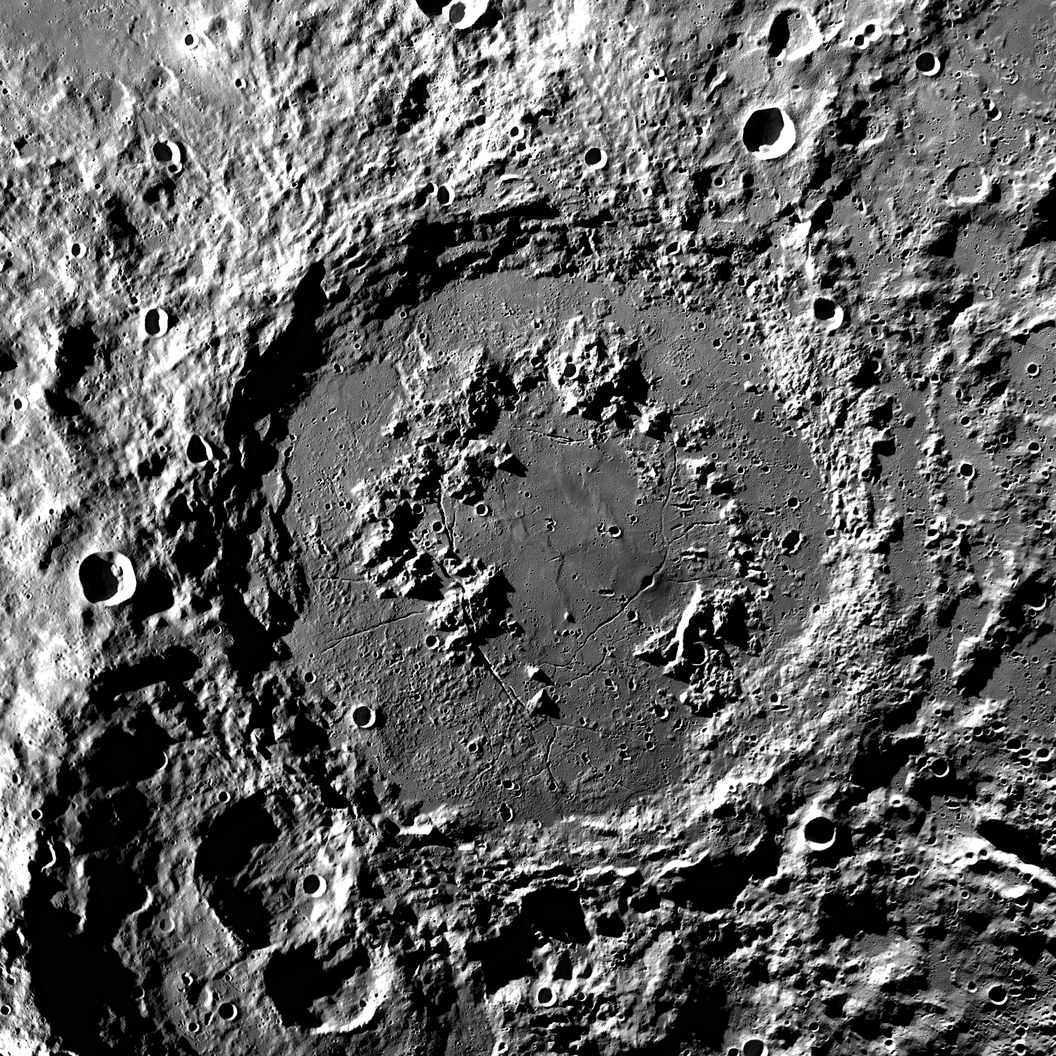
- Schrödinger from Lunar Reconnaissance Orbiter. Note the incomplete inner ring.
- Coordinates: 75.0°S 132.4°E
- Diameter: 312 km
- Depth: 4.80 km (2.98 mi)
- Colongitude: 245° at sunrise
- Formation: Early Imbrian
- Eponym: Erwin Schrödinger

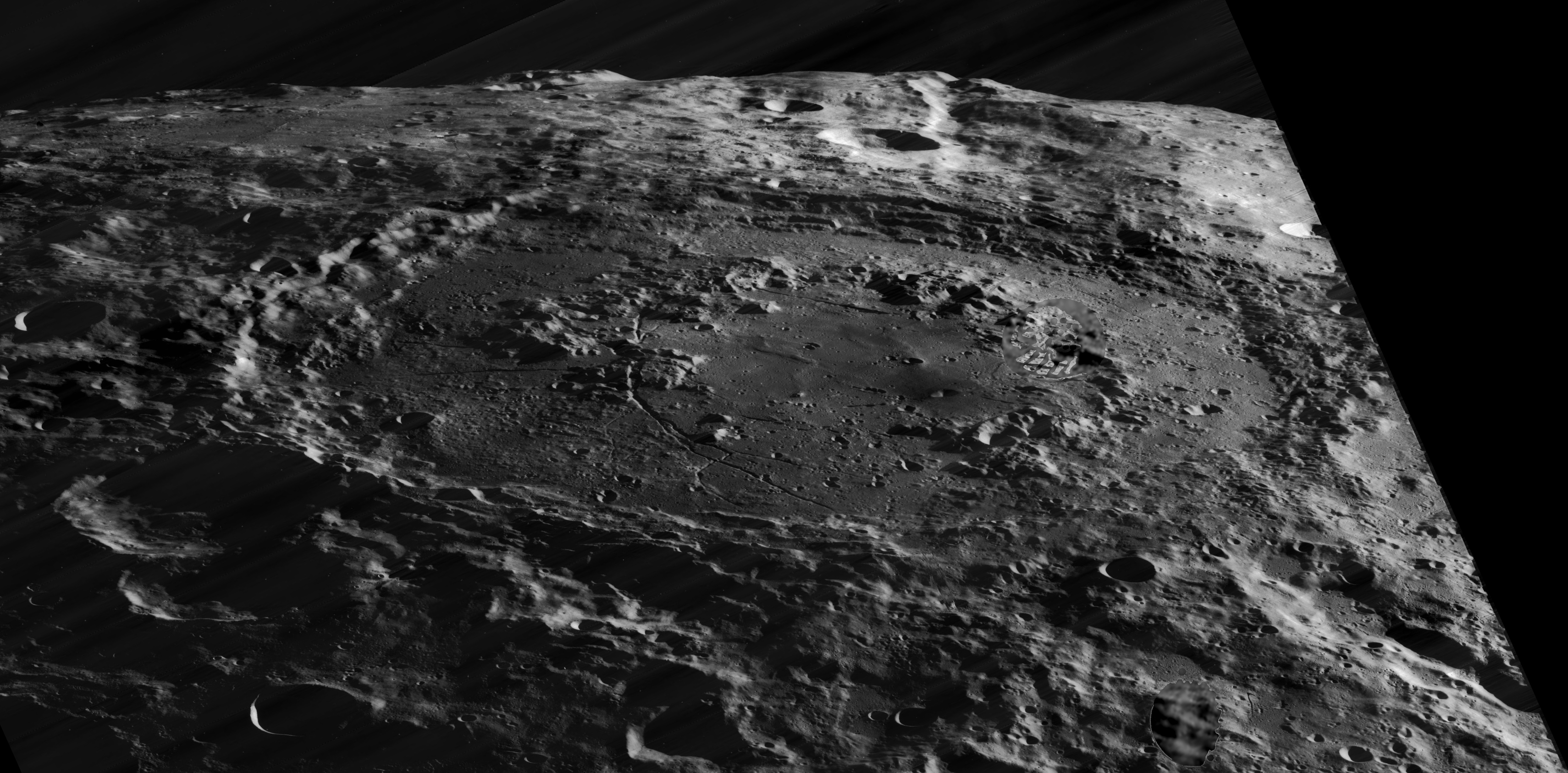
Oblique view from Lunar Orbiter 5

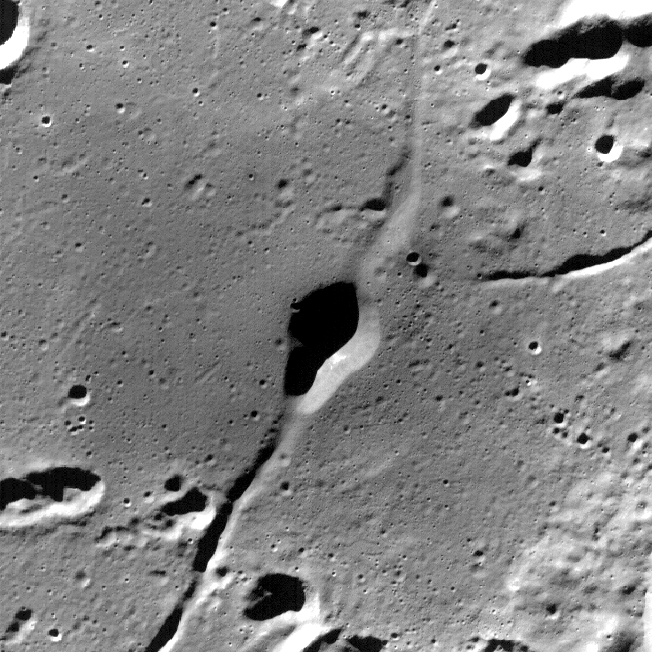
Close up of Schrödinger G, the low-albedo area within Schrödinger, which is interpreted as a volcanic vent, similar to those in Alphonsus on the near side.

Schrödinger is a large lunar impact crater of the form traditionally called a walled plain and is named after Erwin Schrödinger. This class of formation is known as a peak ring basin, which has a single interior topographic ring or a discontinuous ring of peaks with no central peak. It dates to the Early Imbrian period of the lunar geologic timescale. This crater is located near the south lunar pole on the far side of the Moon, and can only be viewed from orbit.

The smaller crater Ganswindt is attached to the southwestern rim of Schrödinger, and intrudes slightly into the inner wall. Adjacent to the south is the crater Nefed'ev. Farther to the southwest is the crater Amundsen.

== Observations ==
Schrödinger is perhaps the moon's best example of a peak-ring basin. It possesses a wide outer rim that has been slightly rounded due to subsequent impacts. But the rim remains well-defined, and traces of terraces can be seen along the inner surface. The ejecta on the exterior forms an irregular outer rampart that extends for up to 100 kilometers.

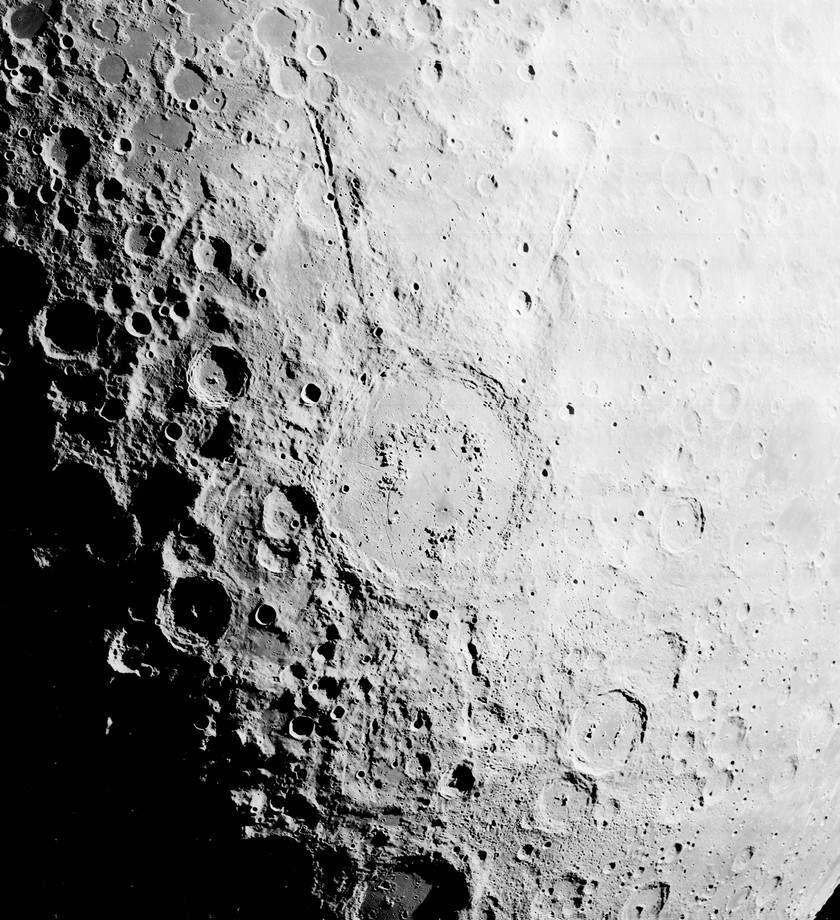
Schrödinger at center. Vallis Planck extends from the crater to the upper right of center, and Vallis Schrödinger is to the upper left of center, going through Sikorsky crater. The south pole itself is in lower left, in shadow.

Within the interior is a second ring approximately half the diameter of the outer rim. This forms a circular range of rugged mountains that surrounds the center, with the exception of a wide gap in the south. The remainder of the floor has been resurfaced by subsequent lava flows, producing a relatively flat surface particularly within the inner ring. The exception is an area of rough ground in the southeast part of the interior.

A complex of rilles has formed across the floor, forming multiple clefts particularly in the south. The floor has also been marked by subsequent impacts, leaving tiny craterlets scattered across the surface. There is no central peak at the midpoint of the interior.

There is a long, narrow valley leading directly away from Schrödinger to the northwest, designated Vallis Schrödinger. This formation begins some distance from the outer rim of the crater, at the edge of the ejecta that surrounds the perimeter. It extends to the rim of the crater Moulton. Another similar valley designated Vallis Planck radiates to the north, beginning near the crater Grotrian at the periphery of the Schrödinger ejecta, and extending past Fechner.

The Schrödinger impact basin is one of a few locations on the Moon that show evidence of geologically recent volcanic activity. A geological study of the basin shows evidence of lava flows and eruptions from vents. There is also older volcanic material and material scattered because of impacts. The volcanic vent is called Schrödinger G, and is thought to be Imbrian in age.

== Satellite craters ==
By convention these features are identified on lunar maps by placing the letter on the side of the crater midpoint that is closest to Schrödinger.

Schrödinger	Latitude	Longitude	Diameter
B	68.4° S	141.3° E	25 km
G	75.4° S	137.2° E	8 km
J	78.4° S	154.6° E	16 km
W	68.5° S	115.6° E	12 km

== Popular culture ==
Schrödinger crater is the location of the Moon Nazi base, Schwarze Sonne, in the Finnish film Iron Sky.
