= Clementine (spacecraft) =

American space project

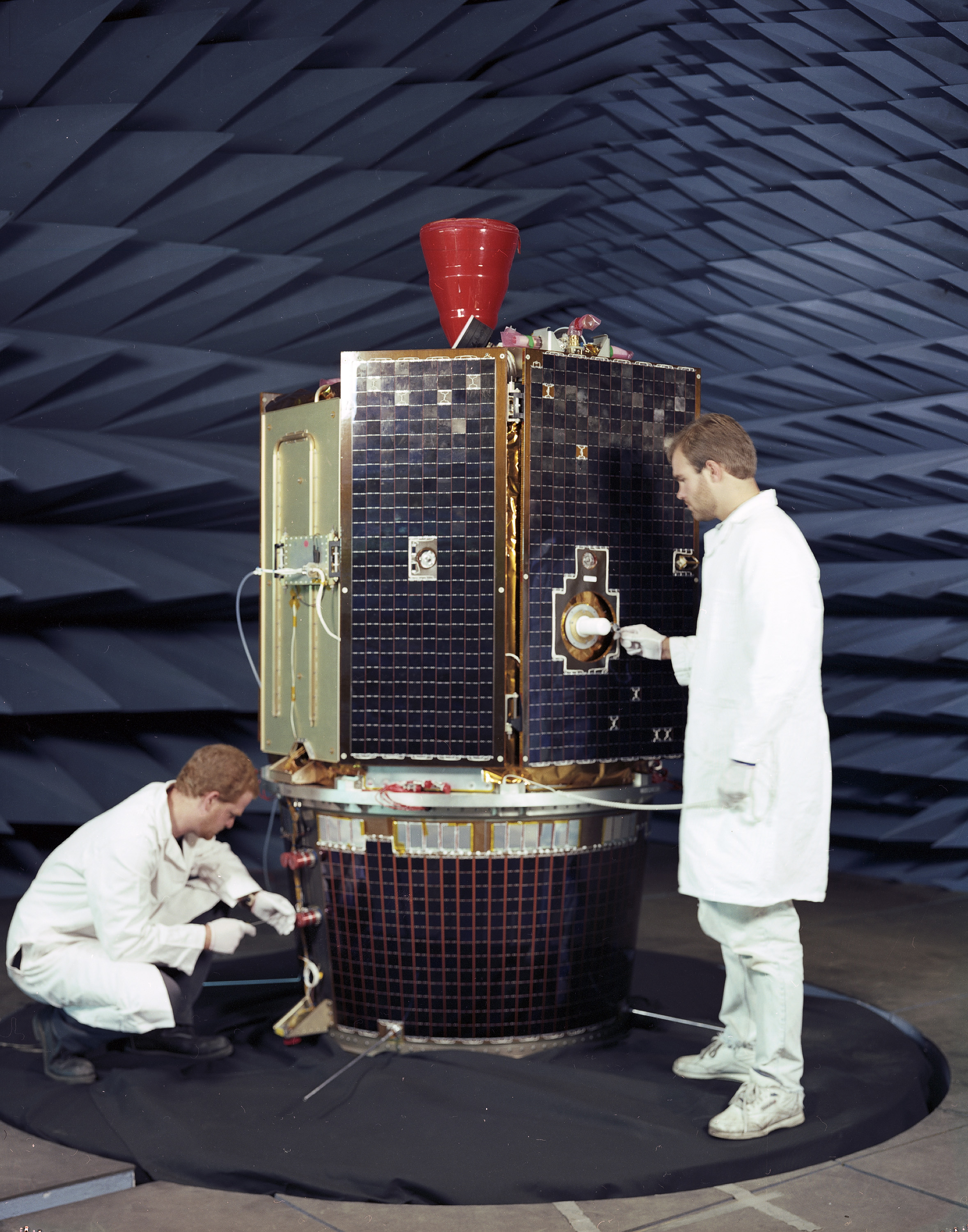
- Mission type: Technology demonstration Lunar orbiter Asteroid probe
- Operator: BMDO / NASA
- COSPAR ID: 1994-004A
- SATCAT no.: 22973
- Mission duration: 115 days

Spacecraft properties
- Manufacturer: Naval Research Laboratory
- Launch mass: 424 kg
- Dry mass: 227 kilograms (500 lb)
- Power: 1,850 watts

Start of mission
- Launch date: January 25, 1994, 16:34:00 UTC
- Rocket: Titan II(23)G
- Launch site: Vandenberg SLC-4W

End of mission
- Last contact: May 10, 1995

Orbital parameters
- Reference system: Selenocentric
- Semi-major axis: 5,116.0 kilometres (3,178.9 mi)
- Eccentricity: 0.36
- Periselene altitude: 2,162 kilometres (1,343 mi)
- Aposelene altitude: 4,594 kilometres (2,855 mi)
- Inclination: 90°
- Period: 300 minutes

Lunar orbiter
- Orbital insertion: February 21, 1994
- Orbital departure: May 3, 1994

Instruments
- Charged particle telescope Ultraviolet/Visible camera Near-Infrared CCD camera (NIR); Laser Image Detection and Ranging (LIDAR) system High-resolution camera (HIRES)
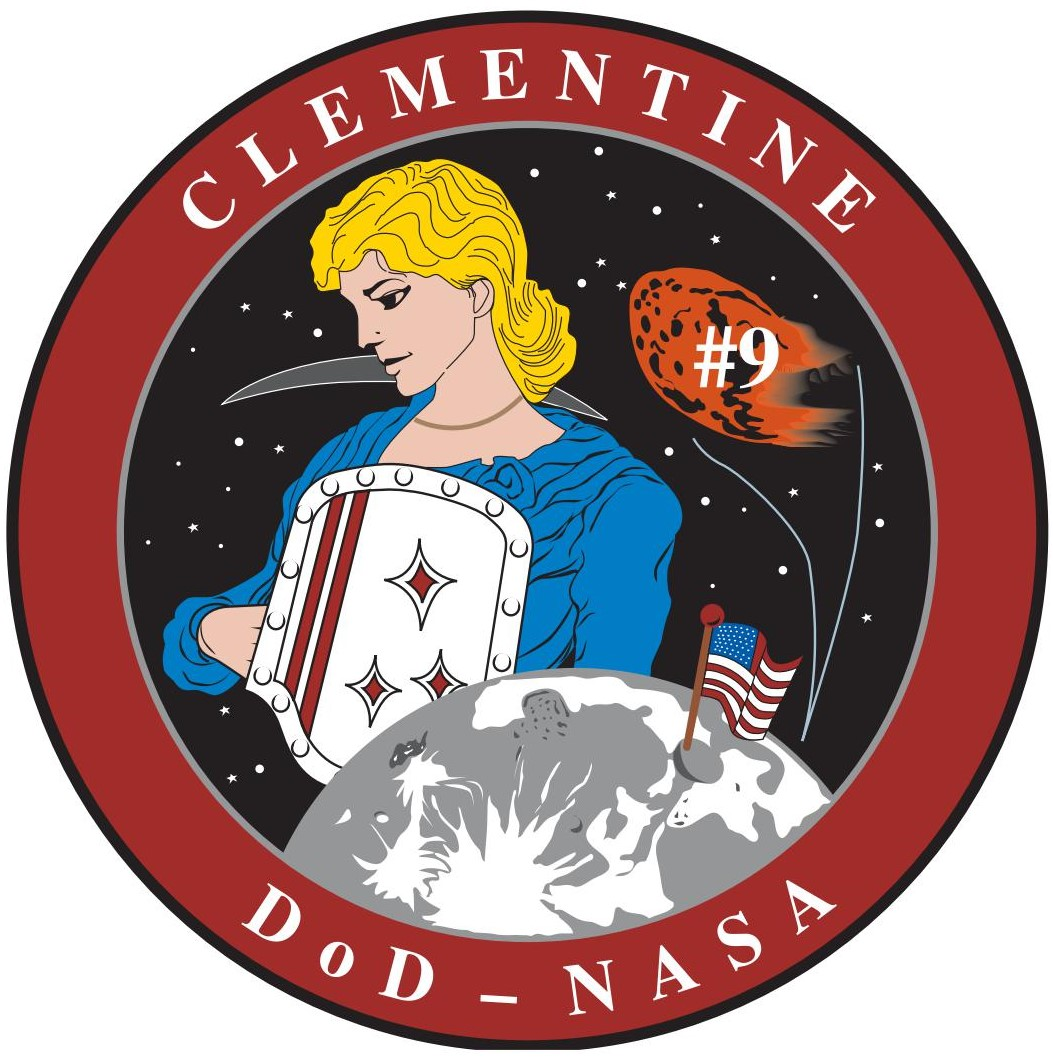
- Clementine mission logo

Clementine (officially called the Deep Space Program Science Experiment (DSPSE)) is a partially failed joint space project between the Ballistic Missile Defense Organization (previously the Strategic Defense Initiative Organization) and NASA, launched on January 25, 1994. Its objective was to test sensors and spacecraft components in long-term exposure to space and to make scientific observations of both the Moon and the near-Earth asteroid 1620 Geographos.

Its lunar observations included imaging at various wavelengths in the visible as well as in ultraviolet and infrared, laser ranging altimetry, gravimetry, and charged particle measurements. These observations were for the purposes of obtaining multi-spectral imaging of the entire lunar surface, assessing the surface mineralogy of the Moon, obtaining altimetry from 60°N to 60°S latitude, and obtaining gravity data for the near side. There were also plans to image and determine the size, shape, rotational characteristics, surface properties, and cratering statistics of Geographos. However, observation of the asteroid was not made due to a malfunction in the spacecraft.

== Spacecraft design ==
3D model of Clementine

The spacecraft was an octagonal prism 1.88 m high and 1.14 m across, with two solar panels protruding on opposite sides parallel to the axis of the prism. A 42-inch-diameter (1,100 mm) high-gain fixed dish antenna was at one end of the prism, and the 489 N thruster at the other end. The sensor openings were all located together on one of the eight panels, 90 degrees from the solar panels, and protected by a single sensor cover.

The spacecraft propulsion system consisted of a monopropellant hydrazine system for attitude control and a bipropellant dinitrogen tetroxide and monomethylhydrazine system for maneuvers in space. The bipropellant system had a total delta-v capability of about 1,900 m/s, with about 550 m/s required for lunar insertion and 540 m/s for lunar departure.

Attitude control was achieved with 12 small attitude-control jets, two star trackers, and two inertial measurement units. The spacecraft was three-axis stabilized in lunar orbit via reaction wheels with a precision of 0.05 deg in control and 0.03 deg in knowledge. Power was provided by gimbaled, single-axis GaAs/Ge solar panels which charged a 15 A·h Ni-H common-pressure-vessel battery.

Spacecraft data processing was performed using a MIL-STD-1750A computer for safe-mode, attitude-control, and housekeeping operations, together with a 32-bit RISC processor for image processing and autonomous operations. An image compression system was provided by the French space agency CNES. A data handling unit sequenced the cameras, operated the image compression system, and directed the data flow. Data was stored in a 2 Gbit dynamic solid-state data recorder.

== Mission ==
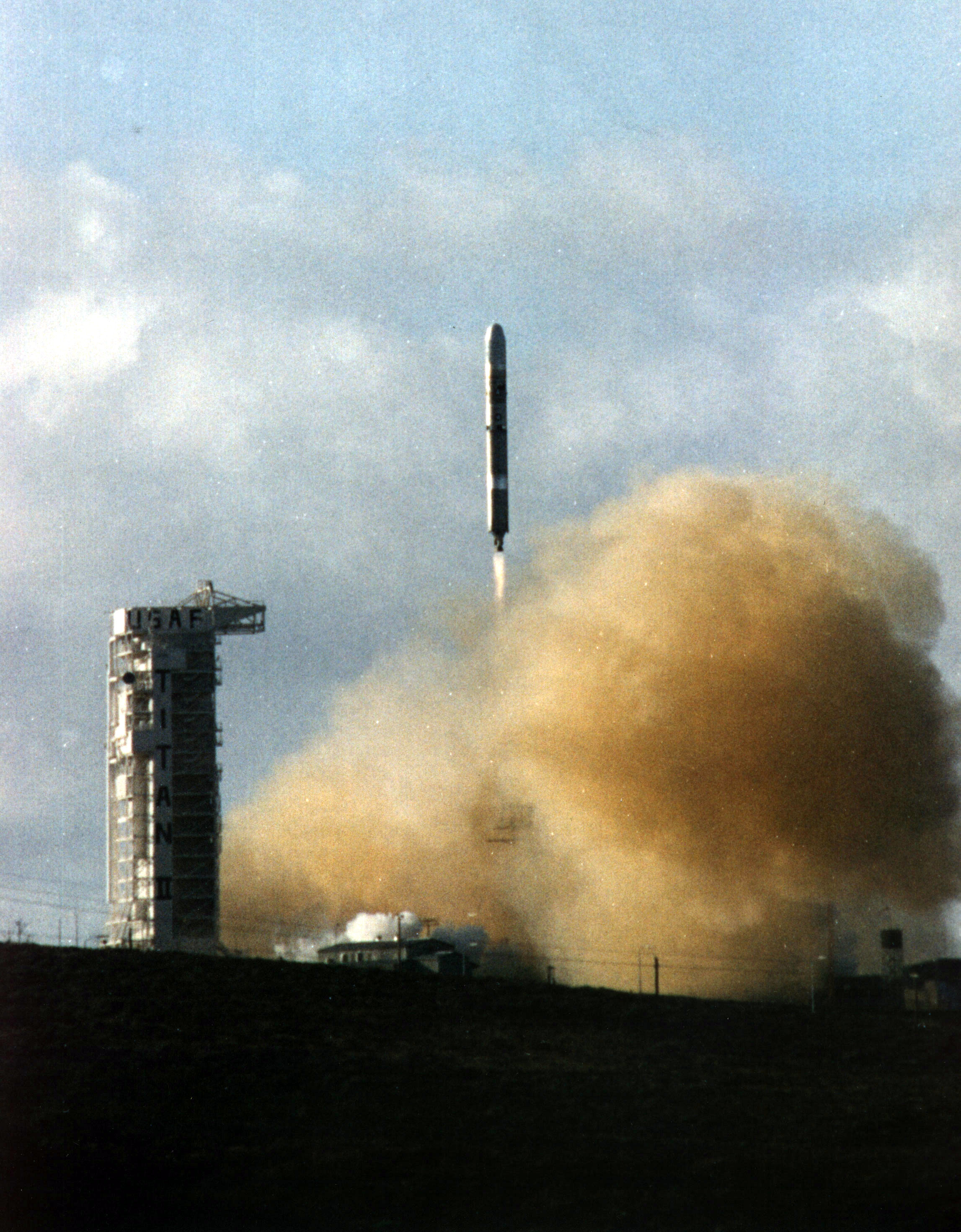
Clementine launch

Animation of Clementine's trajectory around the Moon from February 19, 1994 to May 3, 1994 Clementine · Moon

On January 25, 1994, Clementine was launched from Space Launch Complex 4 West at Vandenberg Air Force Base, California, using a Titan II launch vehicle. The mission had two phases. After two Earth flybys, lunar insertion was achieved approximately one month after launch. Lunar mapping took place over approximately two months, in two parts. The first part consisted of a five-hour elliptical polar orbit with a periapsis of about 400 km at 13 degrees south latitude and an apoapsis of 8,300 km. Each orbit consisted of an 80-minute lunar mapping phase near periapsis and 139 minutes of downlink at apoapsis.

After one month of mapping the orbit was rotated to a periapsis at 13 degrees north latitude, where it remained for one more month. This allowed global imaging and altimetry coverage from 60° south to 60° north, over a total of 300 orbits.

After a Moon to Earth transfer and two more Earth flybys, the spacecraft was to head for 1620 Geographos, arriving three months later for a flyby, with a nominal approach closer than 100 km. Unfortunately, on May 7, 1994, after the first Earth transfer orbit, a malfunction aboard the craft caused one of the attitude control thrusters to fire for 11 minutes, using up its fuel supply and causing Clementine to spin at about 80 rpm. Under these conditions, the asteroid flyby could not yield useful results, so the spacecraft was put into a geocentric orbit passing through the Van Allen radiation belts to test the various components on board.

The mission ended in June 1994 when the power level onboard dropped to a point where the telemetry from the spacecraft was no longer intelligible. However, "because the spacecraft was fortuitously in the correct attitude to power up again, ground controllers were able to briefly regain contact between 20 February and 10 May 1995".

NASA announced on March 5, 1998, that data obtained from Clementine indicated that there is enough water in polar craters of the Moon to support a human colony and a rocket fueling station (see Bistatic Radar Experiment).

== Science instruments ==
=== Charged Particle Telescope (CPT) ===
The Charged Particle Telescope (CPT) on Clementine was designed to measure the flux and spectra of energetic protons (3–80 MeV) and electrons (25–500 keV). The primary goals of the investigation were to: (1) study the interaction of the Earth's magnetotail and interplanetary shocks with the Moon; (2) monitor the solar wind in regions far removed from other spacecraft as part of a multimission coordinated study; and, (3) measure the effects of incident particles on the operating ability of the spacecraft solar cells and other sensors.

In order to meet the stringent limit on the mass of the instrument (<1 kg), it was implemented as a single element telescope. The telescope had a 10 degree half-angle field of view. The detector, a silicon surface-barrier type with an area of 100 mm^{2} and a thickness of 3 mm, was shielded so as to prevent protons below 30 MeV from reaching it from directions other than via the aperture. The aperture was covered by a very thin foil to prevent light impinging on the detector and generating noise. The signal from the detector was broken up into nine channels, the lowest six dedicated to electron detection and the highest three to protons and heavier ions.

=== Ultraviolet/Visible camera ===
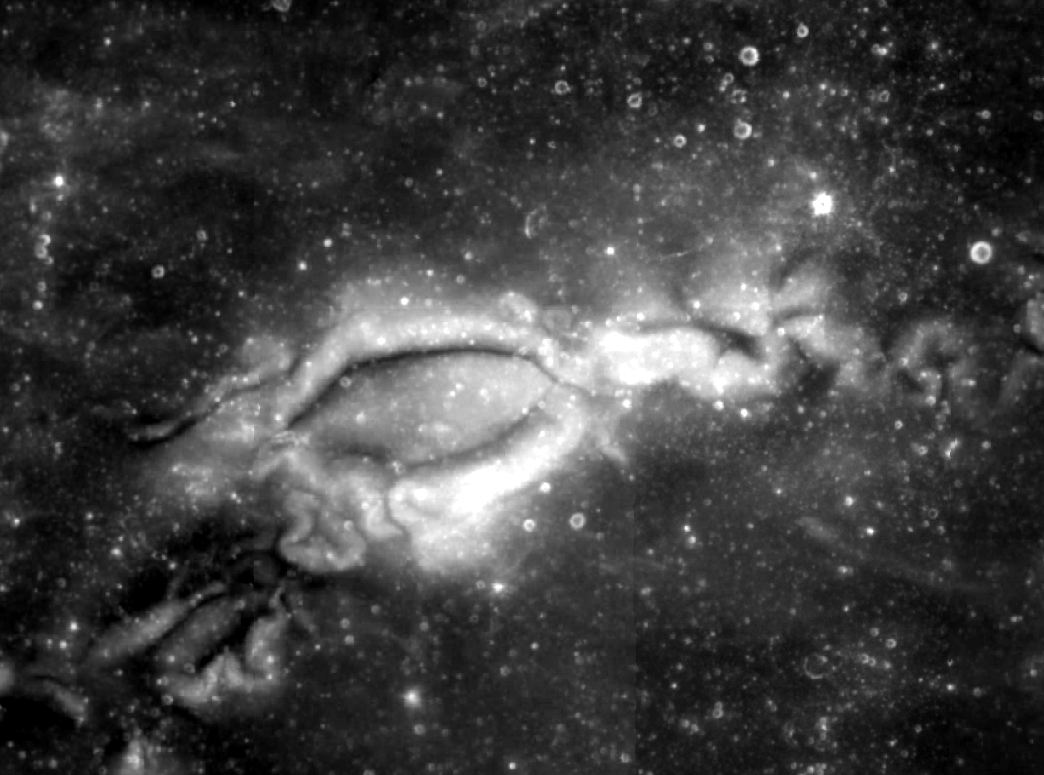
The Reiner Gamma lunar swirls at 750 nm, as recorded by the Clementine mission

The Ultraviolet/Visible camera (UV/Vis) was designed to study the surfaces of the Moon and the asteroid Geographos at five different wavelengths in the ultraviolet and visible spectrum. The Geographos rendezvous was canceled due to equipment malfunction. This experiment yielded information on the petrologic properties of the surface material on the Moon, as well as giving images useful for morphologic studies and cratering statistics. Most images were taken at low Sun angles, which is useful for petrologic studies but not for observing morphology.

The sensor consisted of a catadioptric telescope with an aperture of 46 mm and fused silica lenses focused onto a coated Thompson CCD camera with a bandpass of 250–1000 nm and a six-position filter wheel. The wavelength response was limited on the short wavelength end by the transmission and optical blur of the lens, and on the long end by the CCD response. The CCD was a frame transfer device which allowed three gain states (150, 350, and 1000 electrons/bit). Integration times varied from 1–40 ms depending on gain state, solar illumination angle, and filter. The filter center wavelengths (and bandpass widths (FWHM)) were 415 nm (40 nm), 750 nm (10 nm), 900 nm (30 nm), 950 nm (30 nm), 1000 nm (30 nm), and a broad-band filter covering 400–950 nm. The field of view was 4.2 × 5.6 degrees, translating to a cross-track width of about 40 km at a nominal 400 km lunar altitude. The image array was 288 × 384 pixels. Pixel resolution varied from 100–325 m during a single orbit mapping run at the Moon. At Geographos the pixel resolution would have been 25 m at the 100 km closest approach, giving an image size about 7 × 10 km. The camera took twelve images in each 1.3 s image burst, which occurred 125 times over the 80-minute mapping span during each five-hour lunar orbit. the Moon's surface was covered completely during the two-month lunar mapping phase of the mission. The dynamic range was 15,000. The signal-to-noise ratio varied from 25–87 depending on the surface albedo and phase angle, with a relative calibration of 1% and an absolute calibration of 15%.

=== Near-Infrared CCD Camera (NIR) ===
Short film about the Clementine project

The Clementine Near-Infrared camera (NIR) was designed to study the surfaces of the Moon and the near-Earth asteroid 1620 Geographos at six different wavelengths in the near-infrared spectrum. This experiment yielded information on the petrology of the surface material on the Moon. The rendezvous with Geographos was canceled due to equipment malfunction.

The camera consisted of a catadioptric lens which focused on a mechanically cooled (to a temperature of 70 K) Amber InSb CCD focal-plane array with a bandpass of 1100–2800 nm and a six-position filter wheel. The filter center wavelengths (and bandpass widths (FWHM)) were: 1100 nm (60 nm), 1250 nm (60 nm), 1500 nm (60 nm), 2000 nm (60 nm), 2600 nm (60 nm), and 2780 nm (120 nm). The aperture was 29 mm with a focal length of 96 mm. The field of view was 5.6 × 5.6 degrees, giving a cross-track width of about 40 km at a nominal 400 km lunar altitude. The Moon had complete mapping coverage during the two-month lunar phase of the mission. The image array is 256 × 256 pixels, and pixel resolution varied from 150–500 m during a single orbit mapping run at the Moon. (At Geographos the pixel resolution would have been 40 m at closest approach, giving an image size about 10 × 10 km.) The camera took twelve images in each 1.3 s image burst, which occurred 75 times over the 80 minute mapping span during each five hour lunar orbit. The dynamic range was 15,000. The signal-to-noise ratio varied from 11–97 depending on the surface albedo and phase angle, with a relative calibration of 1% and an absolute calibration of 30%. The gain varied from 0.5X to 36X.

=== Laser Image Detection and Ranging (LIDAR) System ===
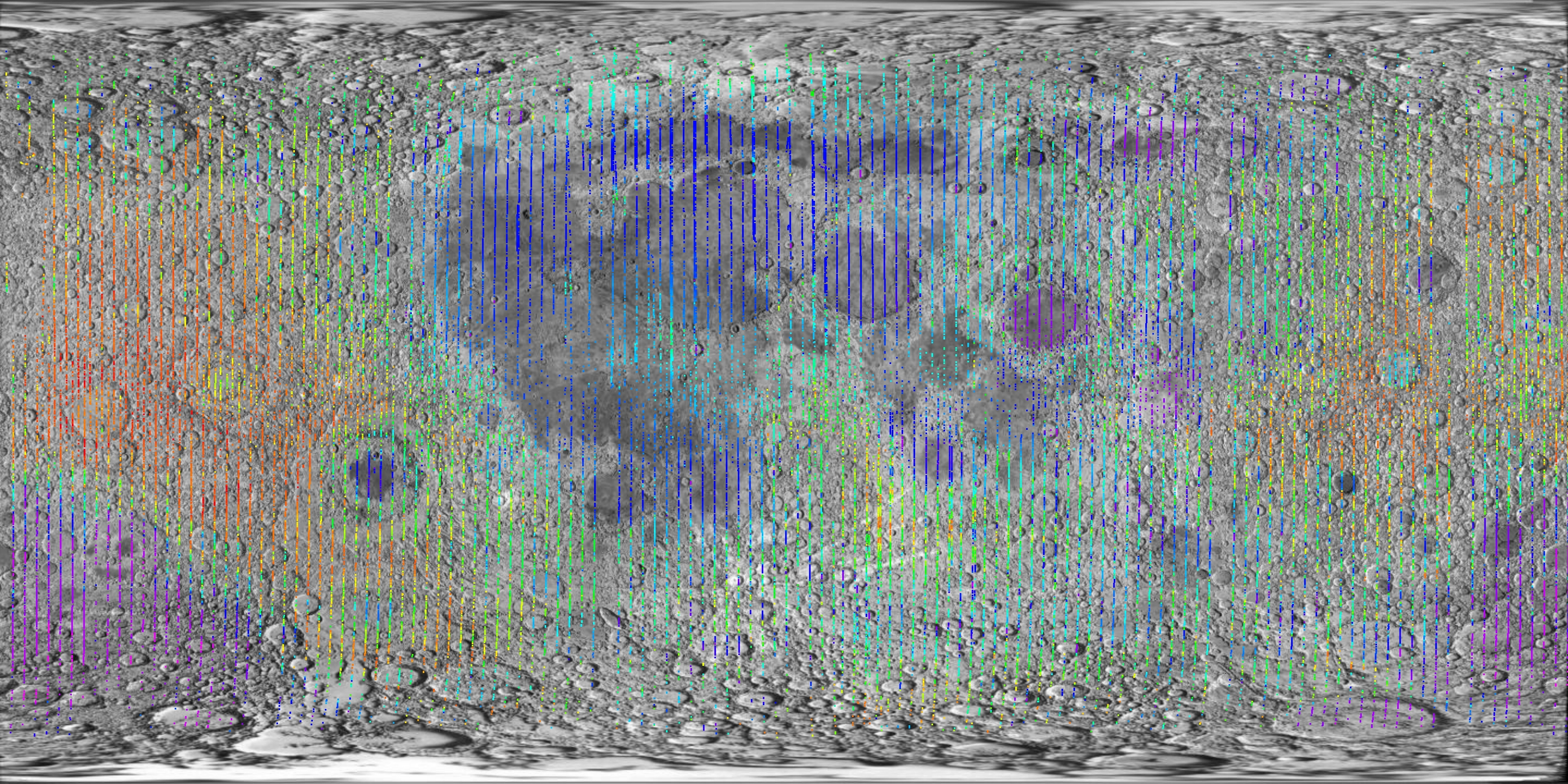
Relief measurements made by LIDAR

The Clementine Laser Image Detection And Ranging (LIDAR) experiment was designed to measure the distance from the spacecraft to a point on the surface of the Moon. This will allow an altimetric map to be made, which can be used to constrain the morphology of large basins and other lunar features, study stress and strain and flexural properties of the lithosphere, and can be combined with gravity to study the density distribution in the crust. The experiment was also designed to measure distances to the surface of Geographos, but this phase of the mission was canceled due to a malfunction.

The LIDAR system consisted of a 180 mJ, 1064 nm wavelength Nd-YAG (Yttrium-Aluminum-Garnet) laser transmitter which transmitted pulses to the lunar surface. The laser produced a pulse with a width less than 10 ns. At 1064 nm wavelength, the pulse had an energy of 171 mJ with a divergence less than 500 microrad. At 532 nm, it had a 9 mJ pulse with a 4 millirad divergence. The reflected pulse travelled through the High-Resolution Camera telescope, where it was split off by a dichroic filter to a silicon avalanche photodiode detector. The detector was a single 0.5 × 0.5 mm cell SiAPD receiver with a field of view of 0.057 square degrees. The laser had a mass of 1250 g, the receiver was housed in the 1120 g HIRES camera. The travel time of a pulse gave the range to the surface. The LIDAR memory could save up to six return detections per laser firing, with a threshold set for the best compromise between missed detections and false alarms. The returns were stored in 39.972 m range bins, equal to the resolution of the 14-bit clock counter. The LIDAR has a nominal range of 500 km, but altimetric data was gathered for altitudes up to 640 km, which allowed coverage from 60 degrees south to 60 degrees north by the end of the lunar phase of the mission. The vertical resolution is 40 m, and the horizontal spot resolution is about 100 m. The across track spacing of the measurements at the equator was about 40 km. One measurement was made each second over a 45-minute period during each orbit, giving an along track spacing of 1–2 km.

=== High-Resolution Camera (HIRES) ===
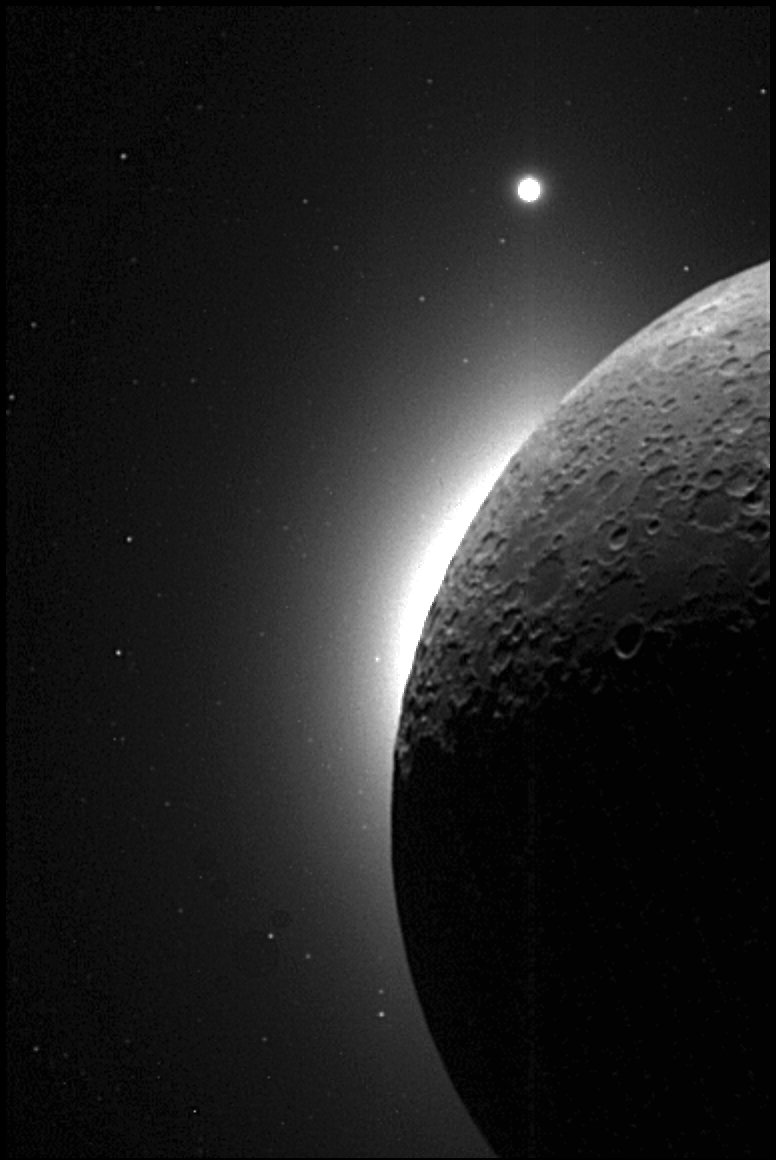
Clementine star tracker view of the Moon and Venus in the distance

The Clementine High-Resolution Camera consisted of a telescope with an image intensifier and a frame-transfer CCD imager. The imaging system was designed to study selected portions of the surfaces of the Moon and the near-Earth asteroid 1620 Geographos, although the asteroid rendezvous was canceled due to a malfunction. This experiment allowed the detailed study of surface processes on the Moon and, combined with spectral data, allowed high-resolution compositional and geologic studies.

The imager was an intensified Thompson CCD camera with a six position filter wheel. The set of filters consisted of a broad-band filter with a bandpass of 400 to 800 nm, four narrow-band filters with center wavelengths (and bandpass width (FWHM)) of 415 nm (40 nm), 560 nm (10 nm), 650 nm (10 nm), and 750 nm (20 nm), and 1 opaque cover to protect the image intensifier. The field of view was 0.3 x 0.4 degrees, translating to a width of about 2 km at a nominal lunar altitude of 400 km. The image array is 288 × 384 pixels, (pixel size of 23 × 23 micrometers) so the pixel resolution at the Moon was 7–20 m depending on the spacecraft altitude. (At Geographos the resolution would have been <5 m at closest approach.) The clear aperture was 131 mm and the focal length was 1250 mm. The nominal imaging rate was about 10 frames per second in individual image bursts covering all filters at the Moon. The high resolution and small field of view only allowed coverage of selected areas of the Moon, in the form of either long, narrow strips of a single color or shorter strips of up to four colors. The instrument has a signal to noise ratio of 13 to 41 depending on the albedo and phase angle, with a 1% relative calibration and a 20% absolute calibration, and a dynamic range of 2000.

The telescope of the High-Resolution Camera was shared by the LIDAR instrument. The 1064 nm laser return was split to the LIDAR receiver (an avalanche photodiode detector) using a dichroic filter.

Imagery from the HIRES can be viewed in NASA World Wind software.

Four orthographic views of the Moon
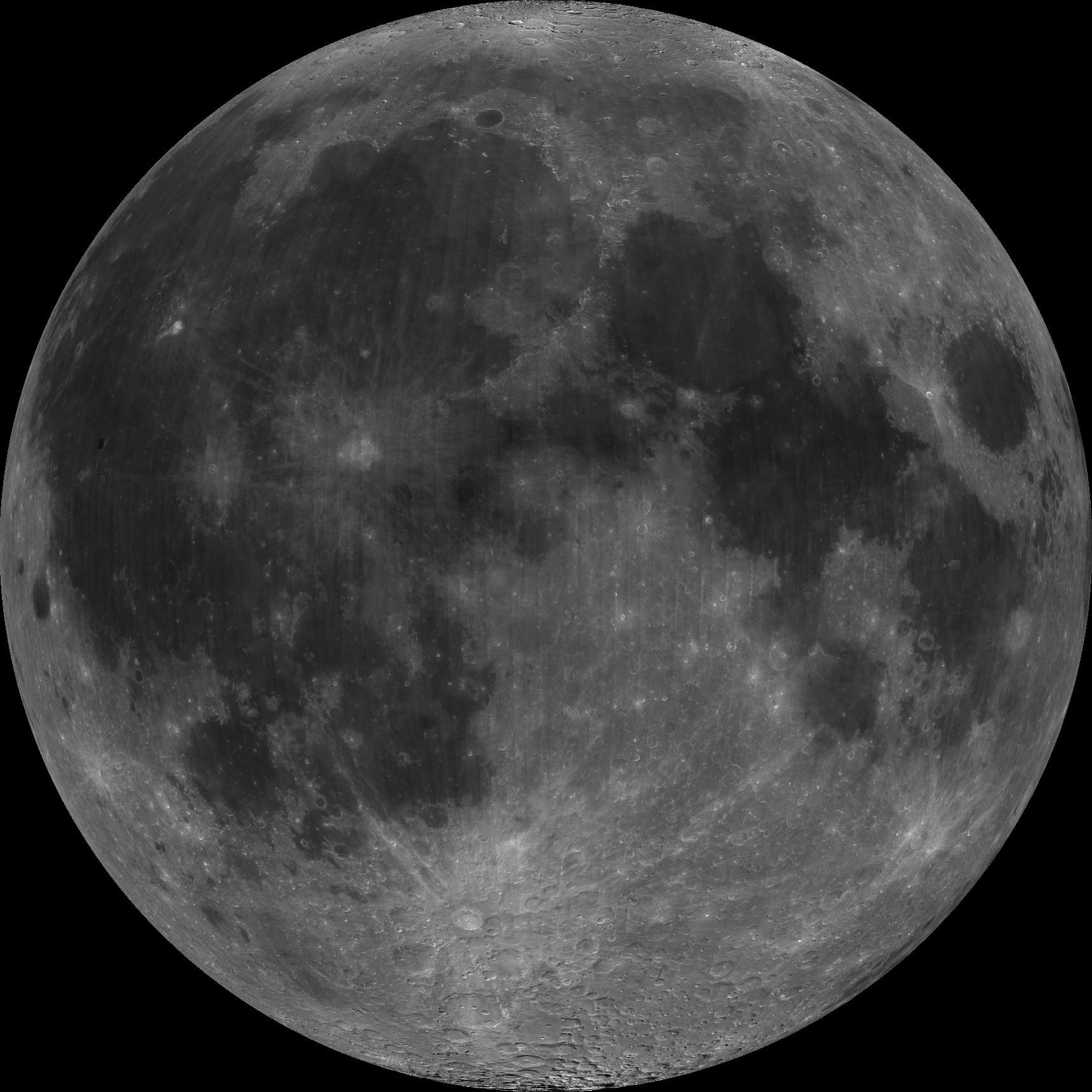
0°
Near side

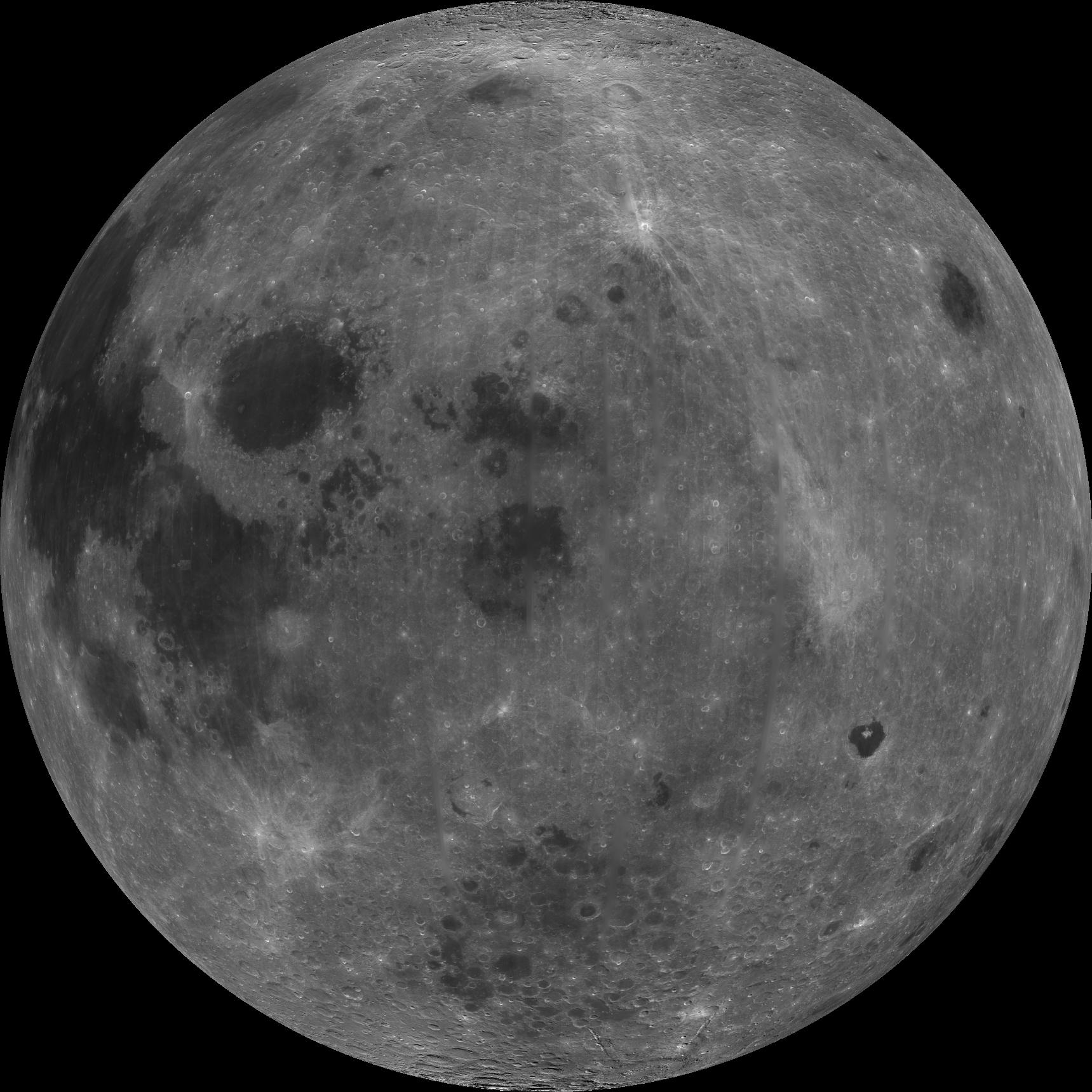
90°
Trailing side

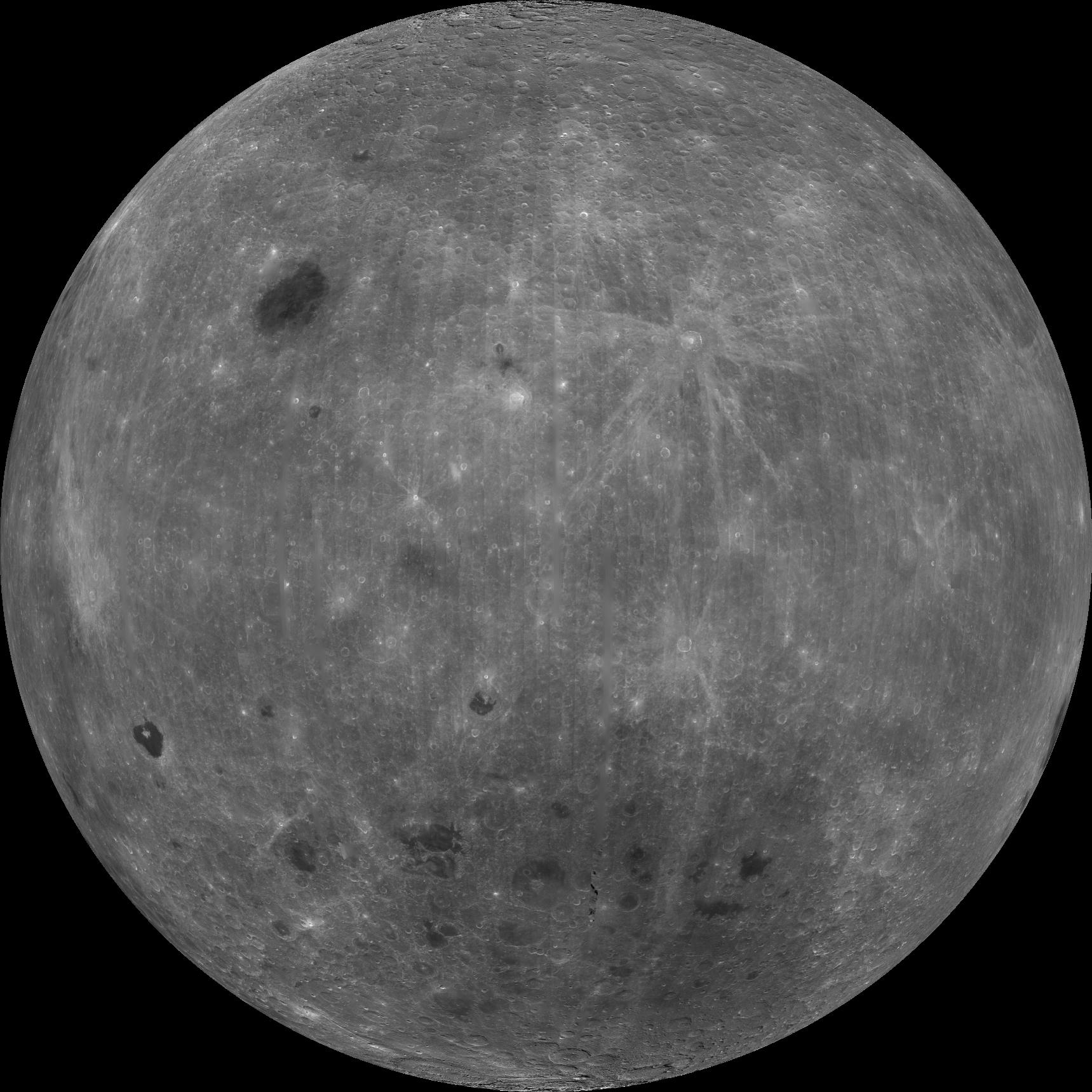
180°
Far side

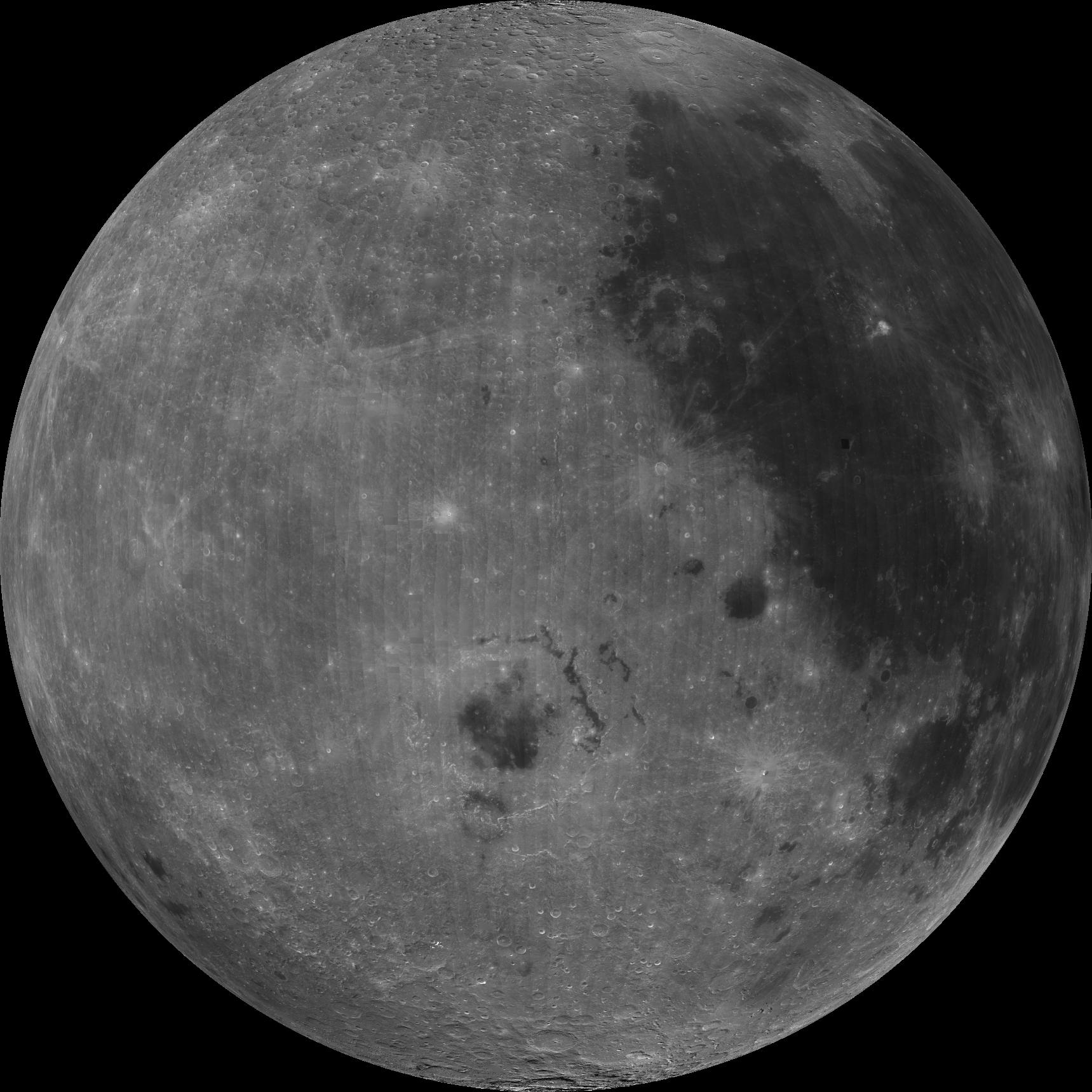
270°
Leading side

Polar regions (orthographic, centered on pole)
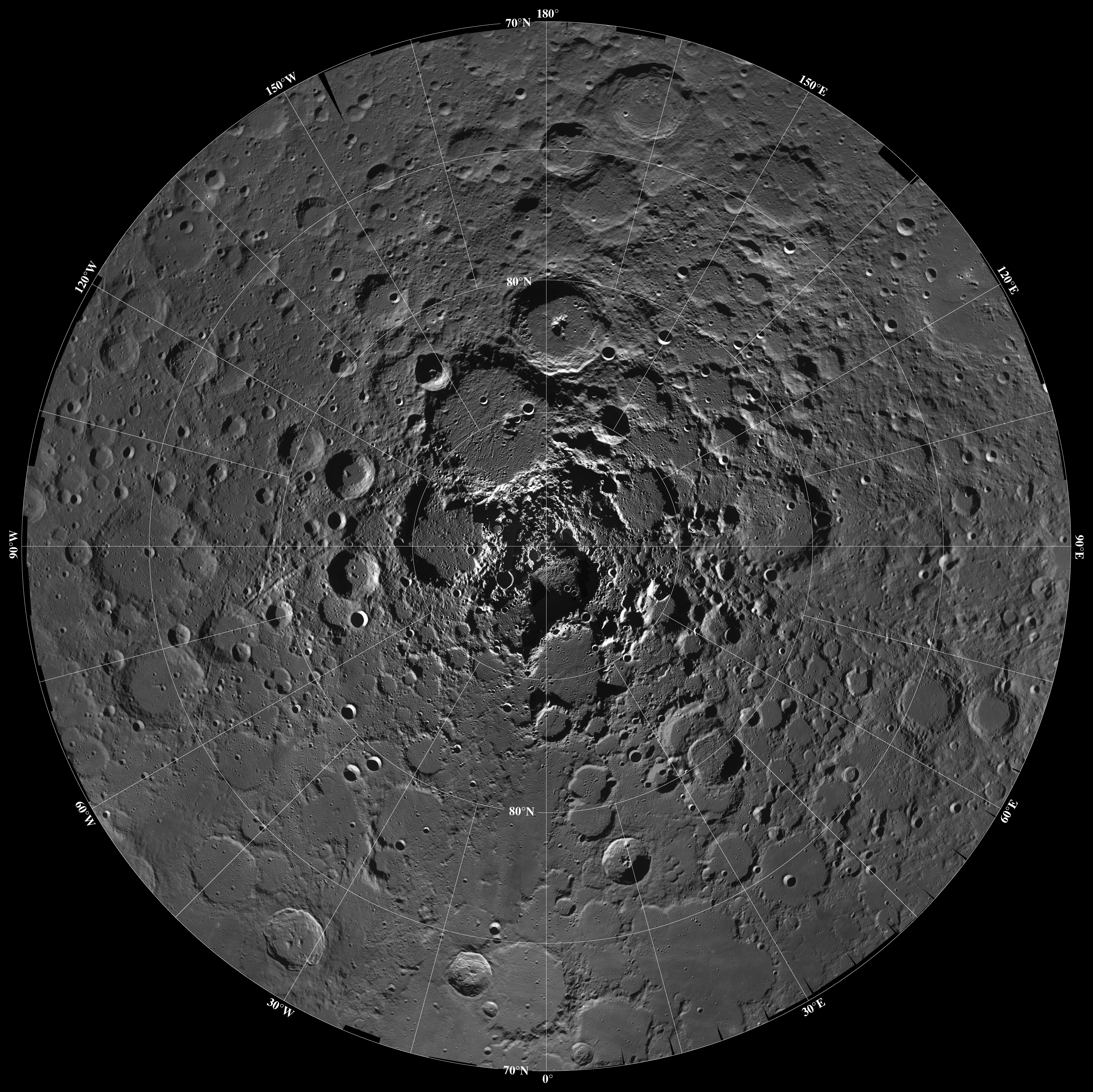
North pole

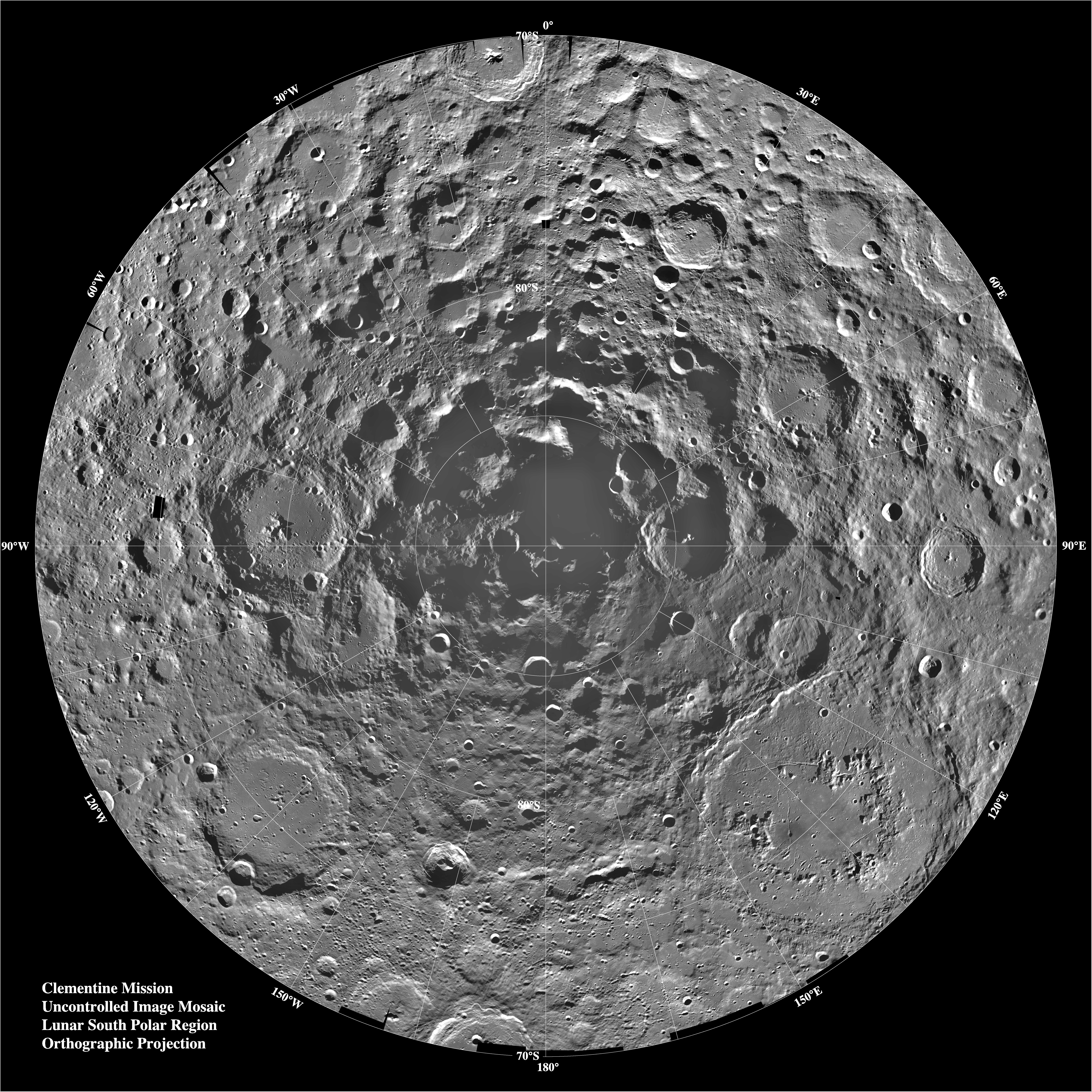
South pole

== Bistatic Radar Experiment ==
The "Bistatic Radar Experiment", improvised during the mission, was designed to look for evidence of lunar water at the Moon's poles. Radio signals from the Clementine probe's transmitter were directed towards the Moon's north and south polar regions and their reflections detected by Deep Space Network receivers on Earth. Analysis of the magnitude and polarisation of the reflected signals suggested the presence of volatile ices, interpreted as including water ice, in the Moon's surface soils. A possible ice deposit equivalent to a sizeable lake was announced. However, later studies made using the Arecibo radio telescope showed similar reflection patterns even from areas not in permanent shadow (and in which such volatiles cannot persist), leading to suggestions that Clementine's results had been misinterpreted and were probably due to other factors such as surface roughness.

== Partial failure and fate ==
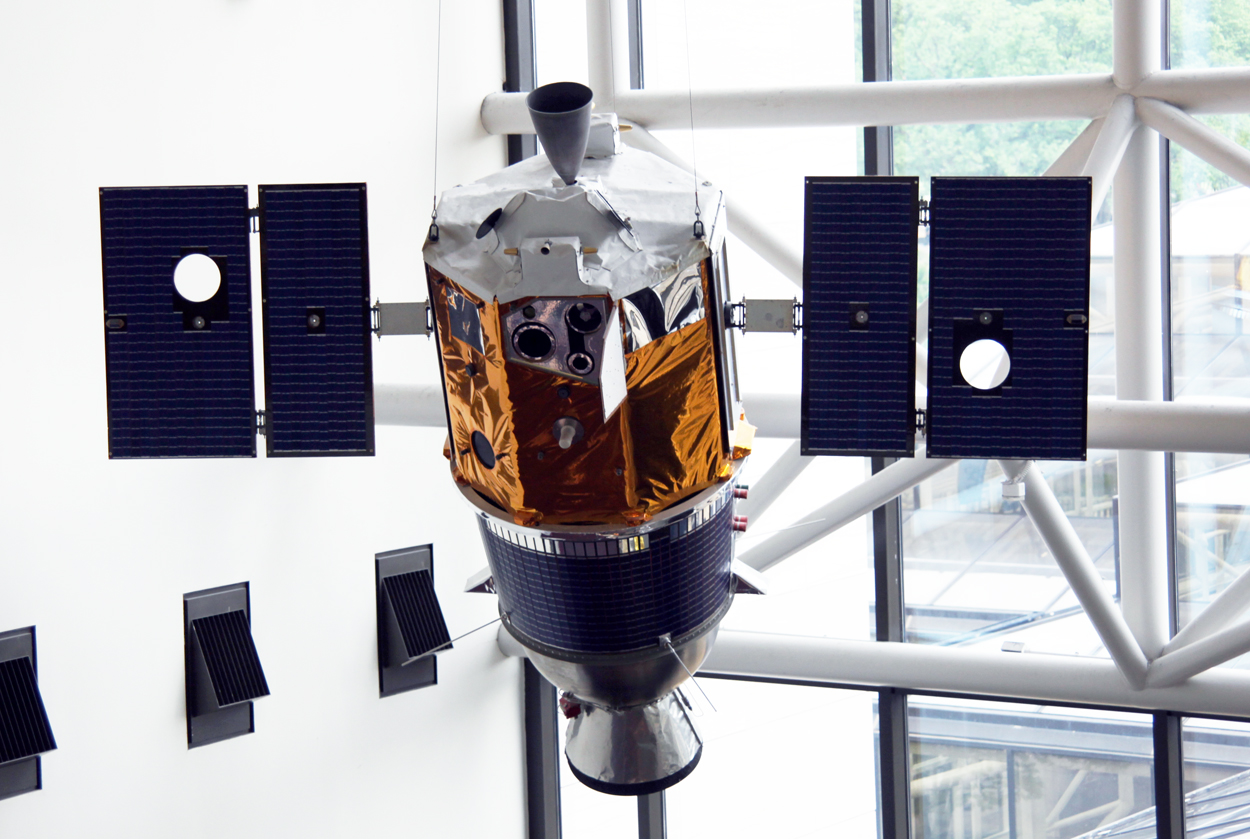
Clementine at the Smithsonian Air and Space Museum

On May 7, 1994 (UTC), Clementine experienced a computer failure after it left Lunar orbit. The failure caused it to use up its remaining propellant, spinning the spacecraft up to 80 rotations per minute. It was utilized in a geocentric orbit until the end of its mission, but the asteroid trip was aborted.

== Artifacts ==
The engineering model of the Clementine spacecraft hangs in the National Air and Space Museum in Washington, D.C.

== See also ==
- List of missions to the Moon
