= List of Russian astronomers and astrophysicists =

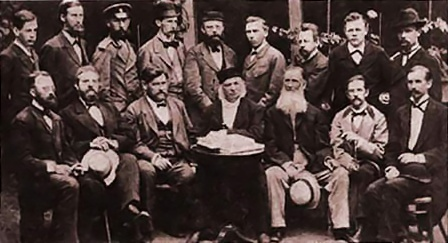
Staff of the Pulkovo Observatory (around 1883–1886). Otto Wilhelm von Struve is in the center.

This list of Russian astronomers and astrophysicists includes the famous astronomers, astrophysicists and cosmologists from the Russian Empire, the Soviet Union and the Russian Federation.

== Alphabetical list ==
=== A ===
- Tateos Agekian, one of the pioneers of Russian and world Stellar dynamics, discoverer of two evolutionary sequences of stellar systems: nearly spherical and strongly flattened
- Vladimir Albitsky, discovered a significant number of asteroids
- Viktor Ambartsumian, one of the founders of theoretical astrophysics, discoverer of stellar associations, founder of Byurakan Observatory in Armenia
- Andrejs Auzāns, director of the Tashkent observatory, 1911–1916

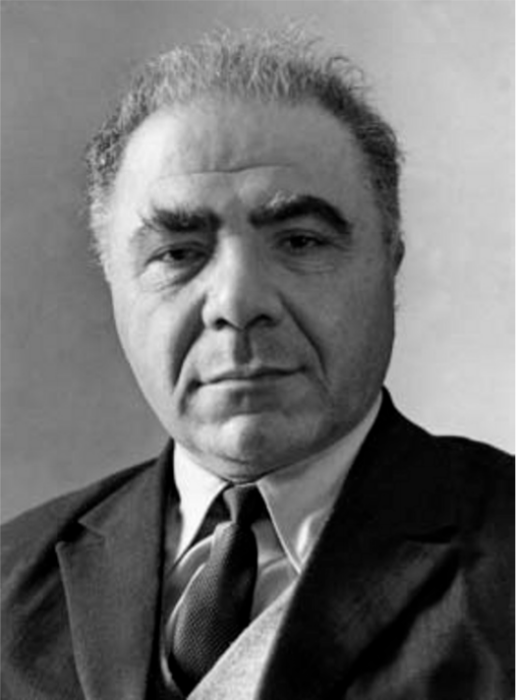
Viktor Ambartsumian

=== B ===
- Nikolai P. Barabashov, co-author of the ground breaking publication of the first pictures of the far side of the Moon in 1961, called Atlas of the Other Side of the Moon; a crater and a planet were named after him
- Vladimir Belinski, an author of the BKL singularity model of the Universe evolution
- Igor Belkovich, made contributions to astronomy; the crater Bel'kovich on the Moon is named after him
- Aristarkh Belopolsky, invented a spectrograph based on the Doppler effect, among the first photographers of stellar spectra
- Sergey Belyavsky, discovered the bright naked-eye comet C/1911 S3 (Beljawsky); discovered and co-discovered a number of asteroids
- Gennady S. Bisnovatyi-Kogan, first determined the maximum mass of a hot neutron star
- Sergey Blazhko, discovered a secondary variation of the amplitude and period of some RR Lyrae stars and related pulsating variables, now known as the Blazhko effect
- Semion Braude, co-developed large-scale radio interferometers for precise examination of extraterrestrial radio sources
- Fyodor Bredikhin, developed the theory of comet tails, meteors and meteor showers, a director of the Pulkovo Observatory
- Matvei Petrovich Bronstein, theoretical physicist; pioneer of quantum gravity; author of works in astrophysics, semiconductors, quantum electrodynamics and cosmology
- Jacob Bruce, statesman, naturalist and astronomer, founder of the first observatory in Russia (in the Sukharev Tower)

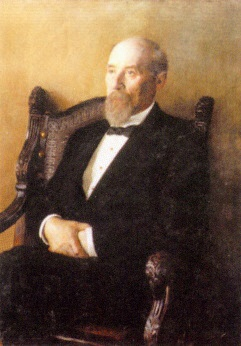
Bredikhin

=== C ===
- Lyudmila Chernykh, astronomer, discovered 268 asteroids
- Nikolai Chernykh, astronomer, discovered 537 asteroids and two comets
- Aleksandr Chudakov, co-discoverer of the Earth's radiation belt

=== D ===
- Denis Denisenko, astronomer, author of more than 25 scientific articles and a presenter at five international conferences
- A. G. Doroshkevich, along with Igor Novikov, discovered cosmic microwave background radiation as a detectable phenomenon
- Alexander Dubyago, expert in theoretical astrophysics; the lunar crater Dubyago is named after him and his father, Dmitry Ivanovich Dubyago
- Dmitry Dubyago, expert in theoretical astrophysics, astrometry, and gravimetry; a crater on the Moon is named after him and his son

=== E ===
- Vasily Engelhardt, researched comets, asteroids, nebulae, and star clusters, in an observatory he built himself

=== F ===
- Vasily Fesenkov, founded the Alma-Ata (now Tien Shan) astrophysical observatory, and was the first to make a study of Zodiacal light using photometry, and suggested a theory of its dynamics
- Kirill Florensky, head of Comparative Planetology at the Vernadsky Institute of the U.S.S.R. Academy of Sciences; the crater Florensky on the Moon is named after him
- Alexander Friedmann, mathematician and cosmologist, discovered the expanding-universe solution to the general relativity field equations.; authored the FLRW metric of Universe
- Alexei Fridman, predicted existence of smaller satellites around Uranus

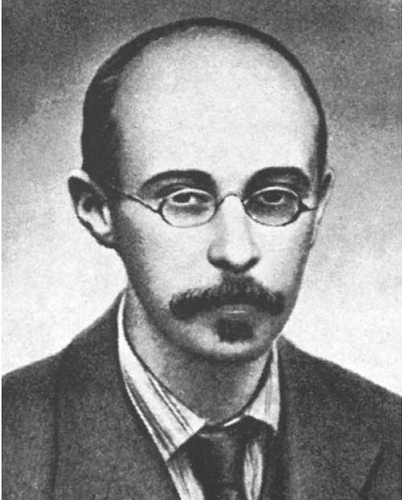
Friedmann

=== G ===
- George Gamow, theoretical physicist and cosmologist, discovered alpha decay via quantum tunneling and Gamow factor in stellar nucleosynthesis, introduced the Big Bang nucleosynthesis theory, predicted cosmic microwave background
- Vitaly Ginzburg, co-developed the theory of superconductivity, the theory of electromagnetic wave propagation in plasmas, and a theory of the origin of cosmic radiation
- Sergey Glazenap, astronomer; a crater on the Moon and the minor planet 857 Glasenappia are named after him
- Alexander A. Gurshtein, developed a concept of history of constellations and the zodiac
- Matvey Gusev, the first to prove the non-sphericity of the Moon, pioneer of photography in astronomy

=== I ===
- Naum Idelson, astronomer

=== J ===
- Benjamin Jekhowsky, discovered a number of asteroids; made more than 190 scientific publications; the asteroid 1606 Jekhovsky is named after him

=== K ===
- Lyudmila Karachkina, discovered a number of asteroids, including the Amor asteroid 5324 Lyapunov, 10031 Vladarnolda and the Trojan asteroid 3063 Makhaon
- Nikolai Kardashev, astrophysicist, inventor of Kardashev scale for ranking the space civilizations
- Isaak Khalatnikov, an author of the BKL singularity model of the Universe evolution
- Viktor Knorre, astronomer, discovered four asteroids
- Marian Kowalski, first to measure the rotation of the Milky Way
- Nikolai Aleksandrovich Kozyrev, astronomer, observed the transient lunar phenomenon
- Georgij A. Krasinsky, astronomer, researched planetary motions and ephemeris
- Feodosy Krasovsky, astronomer and geodesist; measured the Krasovsky ellipsoid, a coordinate system used in the USSR and the post-Soviet states
- Yevgeny Krinov, astronomer, renowned meteorite researcher; the mineral Krinovite, discovered in 1966, was named after him

=== L ===
- Inna Nikolaevna Leman-Balanovskaja, astrophysicist
- Anders Johan Lexell, astronomer and mathematician; researcher of celestial mechanics and comet astronomy; proved that Uranus is a planet rather than a comet
- Andrei Linde, created the Universe chaotic inflation theory
- Evgeny Lifshitz, an author of the BKL singularity model of the Universe evolution
- Mikhail Lomonosov polymath, inventor of the off-axis reflecting telescope, discoverer of the atmosphere of Venus
- Mikhail Lyapunov, astronomer
- Kronid Lyubarsky, worked on the Soviet program of interplanetary exploration of Mars

=== M ===
- Benjamin Markarian, discovered Markarian's Chain
- Dmitri Dmitrievich Maksutov, inventor of the Maksutov telescope
- Aleksandr Aleksandrovich Mikhailov, credited with leading the post-war revival of the Pulkovo Observatory
- Nikolay Moiseyev, expert in celestial mechanics, worked on mathematical methods of celestial calculations and theory of comet formation

=== N ===
- Grigory Neujmin, discovered 74 asteroids, and most notably 951 Gaspra and 762 Pulcova
- Igor Dmitriyevich Novikov, formulated the Novikov self-consistency principle, an important contribution to the theory of time travel
- Boris Numerov, created various astronomic and mineralogical instruments, as well as various algorithms and methods that bear his name

=== P ===
- Pavel Petrovich Parenago, known for contributions to the field of galactic astronomy
- Yevgeny Perepyolkin, observed the proper motion of stars with respect to extragalactic nebula
- Solomon Pikelner, made a significant contribution to the theory of the interstellar medium, solar plasma physics, stellar atmospheres, and magnetohydrodynamics
- Elena V. Pitjeva, expert in the field of Solar System dynamics and celestial mechanics

=== S ===
- Viktor Safronov, astronomer and cosmologist, author of the planetesimal hypothesis of planet formation
- Kaspar Gottfried Schweizer, discovered five comets, and found one NGC object
- Andrei Severny, known for his work on solar flares and astronomical observations from artificial satellites
- Nikolai Shakura, developed theory of accretion and astrophysics of x-ray binaries, co-developed the standard theory of disk accretion
- Grigory Shayn, astronomer and astrophysicist, the first director of the Crimean Astrophysical Observatory, co-developed a method for measurement of stellar rotation
- Inna Shcherbina-Samoylova, astronomer and astrophysicist, specialist in information science, editor and translator
- Vladislav Shevchenko, astronomer, specialized in lunar exploration
- Iosif Shklovsky, astronomer and astrophysicist, author of several discoveries in the fields of radio astronomy and cosmic rays, extraterrestrial life researcher
- Tamara Mikhaylovna Smirnova, co-discovered the periodic comet 74P/Smirnova-Chernykh, along with Nikolai Stepanovich Chernykh; discovered various asteroids; the asteroid 5540 Smirnova was named in her honor
- Friedrich Wilhelm Struve, astronomer and geodesist, founder and the first director of the Pulkovo Observatory, prominent researcher and discoverer of new double stars, initiated the construction of 2,820 km long Struve Geodetic Arc, progenitor of the Struve family of astronomers
- Otto Lyudvigovich Struve, astronomer and astrophysicist, co-developed a method for measurement of stellar rotation, directed several observatories in the U.S.
- Nadezhda Sytinskaya, planetary scientist known for co-developing the meteor slag theory of lunar surface regolith
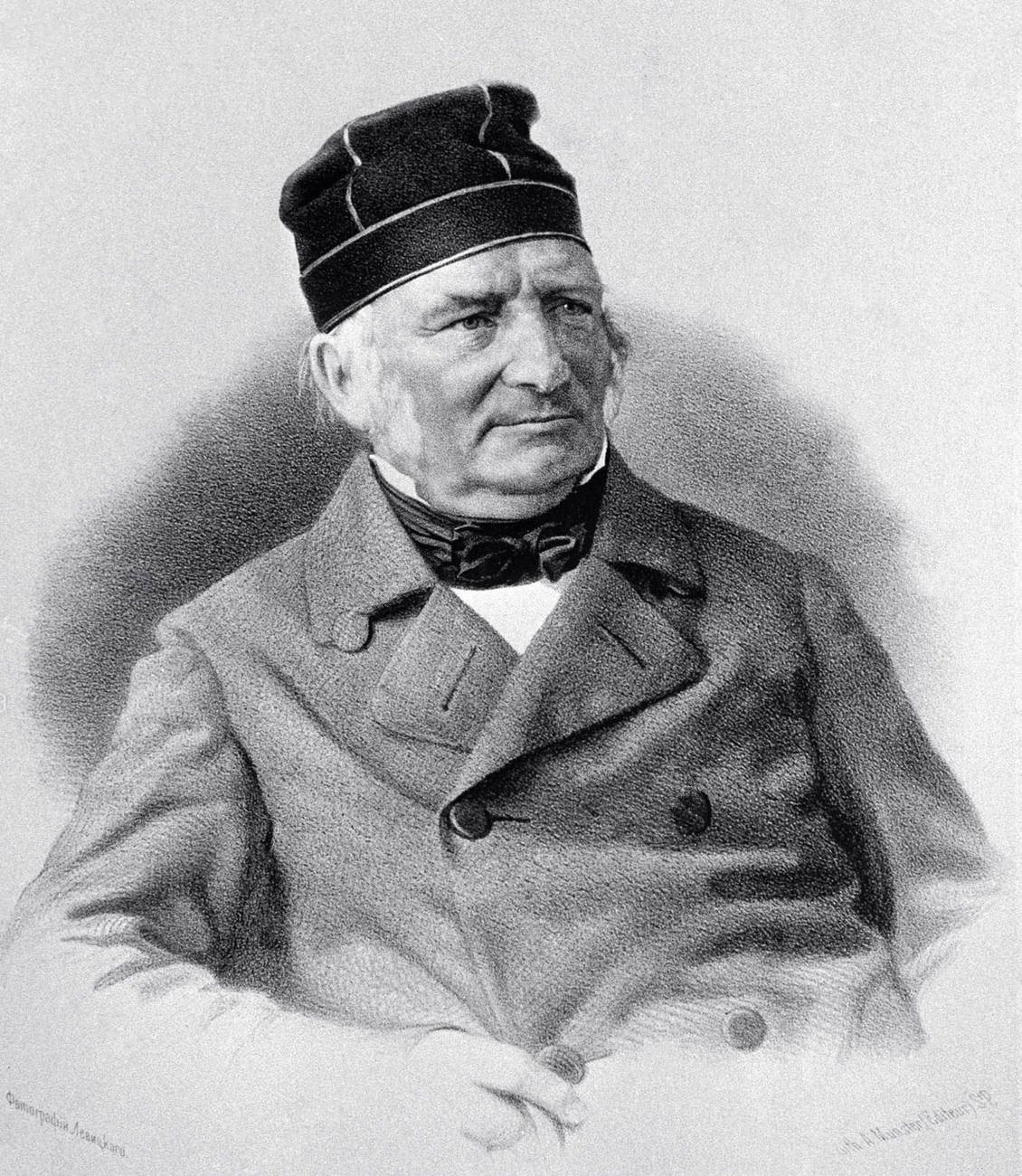
  F.W. Struve
- Otto Wilhelm von Struve, astronomer, director of the Pulkovo Observatory, discovered over 500 double stars
- Rashid Sunyaev, astrophysicist, co-predicted the Sunyaev–Zel'dovich effect of CMB distortion

=== T ===
- Gavriil Tikhov, invented the feathering spectrograph; one of the first to use color filters to increase the contrast of surface details on planets

=== V ===
- George Volkoff, predicted the existence of neutron stars
- Boris Vorontsov-Velyaminov, discovered the absorption of light by interstellar dust, author of the Morphological Catalogue of Galaxies
- Alexander Vyssotsky, created first list of nearby stars identified not by their motions in the sky, but by their intrinsic, spectroscopic, characteristics

=== Y ===
- Avenir Aleksandrovich Yakovkin, astronomer
- Ivan Yarkovsky, discovered the YORP and Yarkovsky effects of meteoroids or asteroids
- Ivan Naumovich Yazev, astronomer and professor, worked at the Pulkovo Observatory and the Mykolaiv Observatory and later headed the observatory at Irkutsk State University from 1948 until 1955.

=== Z ===
- Aleksandr Zaitsev, coined the term Messaging to Extra-Terrestrial Intelligence, conducted the first intercontinental radar astronomy experiment, transmitted the Cosmic Calls and Teen Age Message
- Yakov Zel'dovich, physicist, astrophysicist and cosmologist, the first to suggest that accretion discs around massive black holes are responsible for the quasar radiation, co-predicted the Sunyaev–Zel'dovich effect of CMB distortion
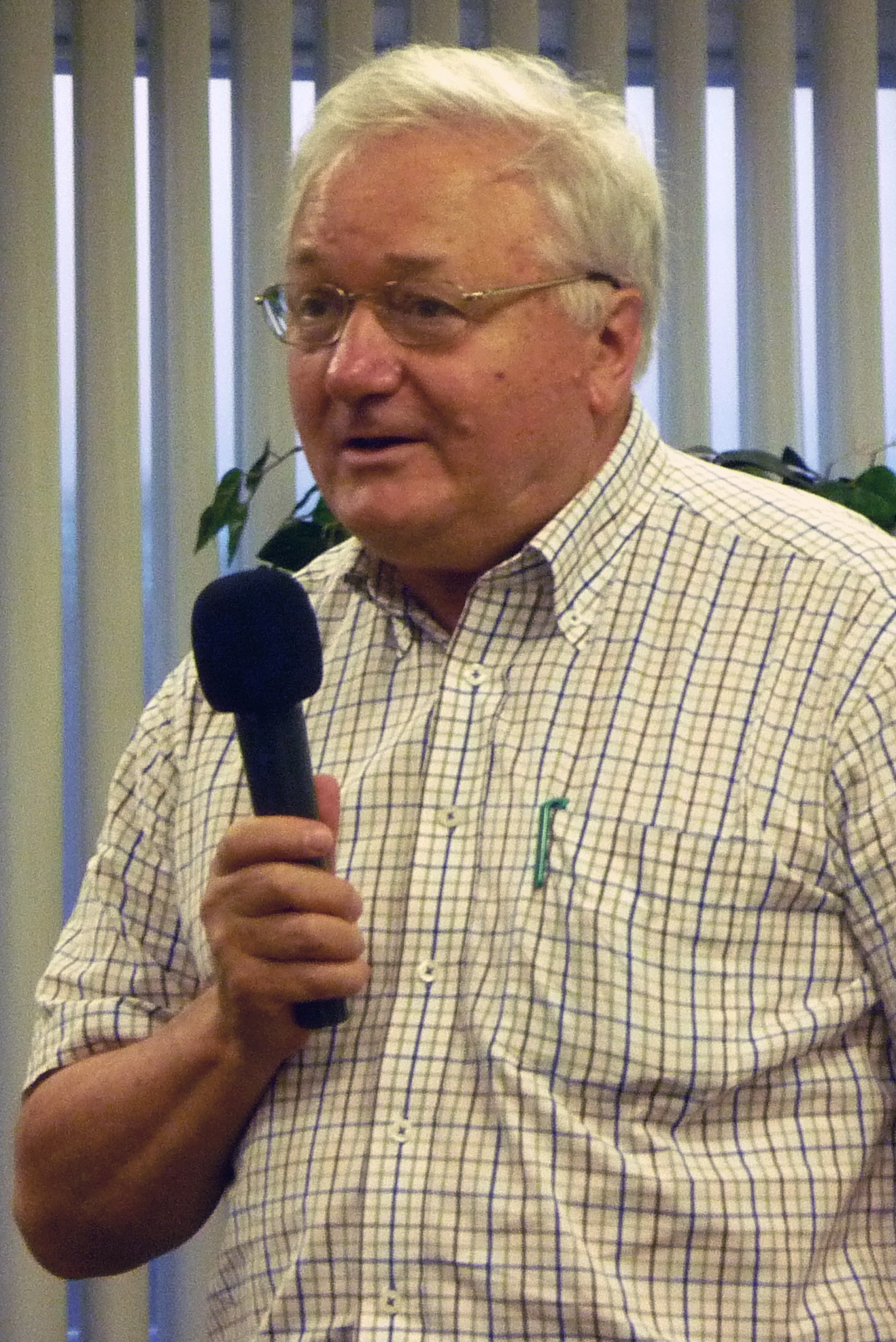
  Sunyaev
- Abram Leonidovich Zelmanov, astronomer
- Sergei Alexandrovich Zhevakin, identified ionized helium as the valve for the heat engine that drives the pulsation of Cepheid variable stars
- Lyudmila Zhuravlyova, discovered a number of asteroids; ranked 43rd by Harvard University's list of those who discovered minor planets; credited with having discovered 200 such bodies
- Felix Ziegel, author of more than 40 popular books on astronomy and space exploration, generally regarded as a founder of Russian ufology

== See also ==
- Bibliography of science and technology in Russia and the Soviet Union
- List of astronomers
- List of astrophysicists
- List of Russian scientists
- List of Russian inventors
- Science and technology in Russia
- Pulkovo Observatory
