= Florensky =

Florensky may refer to:

- Kirill Florensky (1915–1982), Russian geologist, son of Pavel Florensky.
- Pavel Florensky (1882–1937), Russian Orthodox theologian, philosopher, mathematician and electrical engineer.
- Florensky (crater), a lunar crater

== See also ==
- Florinsky
