= Agnès Fienga =

French astronomer

- Scientific career
- Fields: Astronomy
- Institutions: Institut de Mécanique Céleste et de Calcul des Éphémérides

Agnès Fienga is a French astronomer working at the Institut de Mécanique Céleste et de Calcul des Éphémérides.

She is active in the field of planetary ephemerides generation and is a member of the International Astronomical Union (IAU). She collaborated with Dr. E. Myles Standish in research on the asteroids and their impact on the orbital motions. Fienga is also interested in using planetary motions to test gravitational theories. She has recently processed Cassini ranging data and identified an anomalous motion in Saturn's orbit, according to the results by Dr. Elena V. Pitjeva.

According to Google Scholar, her h-index as of 2025 is 43.
