= Athanasoulas =

Athanasoulas or Athanassoulas (Greek: Αθανασούλας) is a Greek family name. It is a patronymic derived from the Greek male given name Athanasios (Αθανάσιος: "immortal"), the genitive case form Athanasoula (Αθανασούλα) being used by female name bearers. Notable people with this name include:

- Ioannis Athanasoulas (born 1987), Greek basketball player
- Lia Athanassoula, (born 1948), Greek astronomer
- Lambros Athanassoulas (born 1976), Greek rally driver
- Georgios Athanasoulas, (born 2001), Greek
