= CMDA =

CMDA can refer to:

- Christian Medical and Dental Associations, a professional medical association
- Chennai Metropolitan Development Authority, is the nodal planning agency within the Chennai Metropolitan Area
- Calcutta Metropolitan Development Authority (former name), is the nodal planning agency for the Kolkata metropolitan area
- Celestial Mechanics and Dynamical Astronomy, a scientific journal for astronomy and astrophysics
