= Brouwer Award (Division on Dynamical Astronomy) =

Astronomy award

The Brouwer Award is awarded annually by the Division on Dynamical Astronomy of the American Astronomical Society for outstanding lifetime achievement in the field of dynamical astronomy. The prize is named for Dirk Brouwer.

== Recipients ==
Source: Division on Dynamical Astronomy of the American Astronomical Society

- 1976 Victor Szebehely
- 1978 No award
- 1979 Paul Herget
- 1980 Boris Garfinkel
- 1981 George Contopoulos
- 1982 Walter Fricke
- 1983 Michel C. Hénon
- 1984 Andre Deprit
- 1985 Peter Goldreich
- 1986 No award
- 1987 Irwin I. Shapiro
- 1988 William M. Kaula
- 1989 Yoshihide Kozai
- 1990 Donald Lynden-Bell
- 1991 Martin Schwarzschild
- 1992 Stanton J. Peale
- 1993 Alar Toomre
- 1994 Christopher Hunter
- 1995 Brian G. Marsden
- 1996 Frank Shu
- 1997 Scott D. Tremaine
- 1998 Sverre Aarseth
- 1999 Vadim Anatol'evich Antonov
- 2000 E. Myles Standish
- 2001 Jack Wisdom
- 2002 James Binney
- 2003 William Ward
- 2004 John Papaloizou
- 2005 James Williams
- 2006 Jacques Laskar
- 2007 Simon White
- 2008 Victor A. Brumberg
- 2009 Tim de Zeeuw
- 2010 Andrea Milani
- 2011 Lia Athanassoula
- 2012 Jerry Sellwood
- 2013 Joseph A. Burns
- 2014 Douglas N. C. Lin
- 2015 Sylvio Ferraz Mello
- 2016 Rosemary F. G. Wyse
- 2017 Ortwin Gerhard
- 2018 James M. Stone
- 2019 Fred Rasio
- 2020 Lennart Lindegren
- 2021 Amina Helmi
- 2022 Harold Levison
- 2023 Alessandra Celletti
- 2024 Dong Lai
- 2025 Robin Canup

== See also ==
- List of astronomy awards
- Prizes named after people
