= Georgij A. Krasinsky =

Russian astronomer

Georgij Albertovich Krasinsky (Георгий Альбертович Красинский, February 19, 1939; Leningrad, USSR – March 17, 2011, Saint Petersburg) was a Russian astronomer active at the Institute of Applied Astronomy, Russian Academy of Science, St Petersburg. He was notable for research on planetary motions and ephemerides.

Krasinsky graduated in 1961 from the Faculty of Mathematics and Mechanics of Leningrad State University. He then became a graduate student and, subsequently, an employee of the Институт теоретической астрономии АН СССР (Institute of Theoretical Astronomy, Academy of Sciences of the USSR). In 1965 he successfully defended his thesis for the Russian Candidate of Science degree (Ph.D.) in physical and mathematical sciences. In 1988 he was transferred to the Institute of Applied Astronomy of the Academy of Sciences of the USSR. There in 1989 he completed his dissertation for the Russian Doctor of Sciences degree (similar to habilitation). Krasinsky and colleagues developed and implemented a problem-oriented language SLON and a software system (called the ERA system) for solving problems in dynamic and ephemeris astronomy. (ERA is the acronym for "Ephemerides for Research in Astronomy".) Krasinsky and colleagues applied the ERA software system to develop a high-precision, long-term numerical theory of the motions of our solar system's planets and Earth's moon.

Krasinsky was the president of IAU commission 4-DI on ephemerides during 2003-2006.

The asteroid 5714 Krasinsky is named after him. Krasinsky was awarded in 1980 the Order of the Badge of Honour and in 1982 the USSR State Prize. He made important contributions to the theory and implementation of Russia's radio interferometric complex "Kvazar-KVO" created at the Институт прикладной астрономии (Institute of Applied Astronomy) of the Russian Academy of Sciences (RAS). For his contribution to the creation of the complex, Krasinsky in 2002 was awarded the Order of Honour.

His students include Elena V. Pitjeva.

== Selected publications ==
- Krasinsky, G. A.; Aleshkina, E. Yu.; Pitjeva, E. V.; Sveshnikov, M. L. (1986). "Relativistic effects from planetary and lunar observations of the XVIII–XX centuries". Proceedings of the International Astronomical Union. 114: 315–328. doi:10.1017/S0074180900148351.
- Krasinsky, G. A.; Pitjeva, E. V.; Sveshnikov, M. L.; Chunayeva, L. I. (1993). "The motion of major planets from observations 1769?1988 and some astronomical constants". Celestial Mechanics and Dynamical Astronomy. 55 (1): 1–23. Bibcode:1993CeMDA..55....1K. doi:10.1007/BF00694392. S2CID 59328452.
- Krasinsky, G. A. (1999). "Tidal effects in the earth moon system and the earth's rotation". Celestial Mechanics and Dynamical Astronomy. 75 (1): 39–66. Bibcode:1999CeMDA..75...39K. doi:10.1023/A:1008381000993. S2CID 119757788.
- Krasinsky, G.; Pitjeva, E. V.; Vasilyev, M. V.; Yagudina, E. I. (2002). "Hidden Mass in the Asteroid Belt". Icarus. 158 (1): 98–105. Bibcode:2002Icar..158...98K. doi:10.1006/icar.2002.6837.
- Krasinsky, G. A. (2002). "Selenodynamical parameters from analysis of LLR observations of 1970-2001" (PDF). Commununications of the IAA RAS. 148: 1–27.
- Krasinsky, G. A.; Brumberg, V. A. (2004). "Secular Increase of Astronomical Unit from Analysis of the Major Planet Motions, and its Interpretation". Celestial Mechanics and Dynamical Astronomy. 90 (3–4): 267–288. Bibcode:2004CeMDA..90..267K. doi:10.1007/s10569-004-0633-z. S2CID 120785056.
- Krasinsky, G.A. (2006). "Numerical theory of rotation of the deformable Earth with the two-layer fluid core. Part 1: Mathematical model". Celestial Mechanics and Dynamical Astronomy. 96 (3): 169–217. Bibcode:2006CeMDA..96..169K. doi:10.1007/s10569-006-9038-5. S2CID 122023525.
- Krasinsky, G. A.; Vasilyev, M. V. (2006). "Numerical theory of rotation of the deformable Earth with the two-layer fluid core. Part 2: Fitting to VLBI data". Celestial Mechanics and Dynamical Astronomy. 96 (3): 219–237. Bibcode:2006CeMDA..96..219K. doi:10.1007/s10569-006-9033-x. S2CID 123415899.
