= 1910 Mikhailov =

Carbonaceous main-belt asteroid

Discovery
- Discovered by: L. Zhuravleva
- Discovery site: Crimean Astrophysical Obs.
- Discovery date: 8 October 1972

Designations
- Named after: Aleksandr Aleksandrovich Mikhailov (astronomer)
- Alternative designations: 1972 TZ_{1} · 1950 QR; 1954 JL · 1959 GP; 1959 JK · 1961 TR; 1969 DD · A916 FC
- Minor planet category: main-belt (outer)

Orbital characteristics
- Epoch 27 April 2019 (JD 2458600.5)
- Uncertainty parameter 0
- Observation arc: 103.39 yr (37,764 d)
- Aphelion: 3.2044 AU
- Perihelion: 2.8828 AU
- Semi-major axis: 3.0436 AU
- Eccentricity: 0.0528
- Orbital period (sidereal): 5.31 yr (1,939 d)
- Mean anomaly: 143.23°
- Mean motion: 0° 11^{m} 8.16^{s} / day
- Inclination: 10.362°
- Longitude of ascending node: 200.82°
- Argument of perihelion: 328.04°

Physical characteristics
- Mean diameter: 31.3 km 37.201±0.080
- Synodic rotation period: 8.88 h (0.370 d)
- Geometric albedo: 0.032±0.007; 0.050; 0.057
- Spectral type: C
- Absolute magnitude (H): 11.5

1910 Mikhailov, provisional designation 1972 TZ_{1}, is a carbonaceous asteroid from the outer regions of the asteroid belt, approximately 35 kilometers (22 mi) in diameter. Discovered at Nauchnyj in 1972, it was named after Russian astronomer Aleksandr Aleksandrovich Mikhailov.

== Discovery ==
Mikhailov was discovered on 8 October 1972, by Ukrainian astronomer Lyudmila Zhuravleva at the Crimean Astrophysical Observatory in Nauchnyj, on the Crimean peninsula.

Zhuravleva is ranked 61 in Harvard's ranking of those who discovered minor planets. Between 1972 and 1992, she discovered 200 such bodies, 13 of which were co-discoveries.

== Orbit and classification ==
The C-type asteroid is a non-family asteroid that belongs to the background population of the main belt. It orbits the Sun in the outer asteroid belt at a distance of 2.9–3.2 AU once every 5 years and 4 months (1,939 days; semi-major axis of 3.04 AU). Its orbit has an eccentricity of 0.05 and an inclination of 10° with respect to the ecliptic.

== Physical characteristics ==
It has a rotation period of 8.88 hours and a low geometric albedo of 0.05.

== Naming ==
The asteroid was named in honor of prominent Russian astronomer Aleksandr Aleksandrovich Mikhailov (1888–1983), a gravimetrist and academician, who was vice-president of the International Astronomical Union, director of the Pulkovo Observatory, a member of the Soviet Academy of Sciences and president of its Astronomical Council. The official naming citation was published by the Minor Planet Center on 20 February 1976 (M.P.C. 3937).
