= 848 Inna =

Main-belt asteroid

Discovery
- Discovered by: G. Neujmin
- Discovery site: Simeiz Obs.
- Discovery date: 5 September 1915

Designations
- Named after: Inna Nikolaevna Leman-Balanovskaya (Russian astronomer)
- Alternative designations: A915 RQ · 1932 WJ; 1934 AC · 1934 CM_{1} 1934 CV · 1937 RD; 1959 TJ · A905 YA; 1915 XS · 1905 YA
- Minor planet category: main-belt · (outer); Themis

Orbital characteristics
- Epoch 31 May 2020 (JD 2459000.5)
- Uncertainty parameter 0
- Observation arc: 114.10 yr (41,676 d)
- Aphelion: 3.6160 AU
- Perihelion: 2.6039 AU
- Semi-major axis: 3.1100 AU
- Eccentricity: 0.1627
- Orbital period (sidereal): 5.48 yr (2,003 d)
- Mean anomaly: 56.581°
- Mean motion: 0° 10^{m} 46.92^{s} / day
- Inclination: 1.0538°
- Longitude of ascending node: 207.82°
- Argument of perihelion: 125.37°

Physical characteristics
- Mean diameter: 33.027±0.130 km
- Synodic rotation period: unknown
- Geometric albedo: 0.069±0.012
- Spectral type: C (S3OS2-TH); Cb (S3OS2-BB)
- Absolute magnitude (H): 11.3

848 Inna (prov. designation: A915 RQ or 1915 XS) is a carbonaceous Themistian asteroid from the outer regions of the asteroid belt. It was discovered on 5 September 1915, by astronomer Grigory Neujmin at the Simeiz Observatory on the Crimean peninsula. The C-type asteroid measures approximately 33 kilometers (21 miles) in diameter, while its rotation period remains unknown. It was named after Russian astronomer Inna Nikolaevna Leman-Balanovskaya (1881–1945).

== Orbit and classification ==
When applying the hierarchical clustering method to its proper orbital elements, Inna is a core member of the Themis family (602), a very large family of carbonaceous asteroids, named after 24 Themis. It orbits the Sun in the outer main-belt at a distance of 2.6–3.6 AU once every 5 years and 6 months (2,003 days; semi-major axis of 3.11 AU). Its orbit has an eccentricity of 0.16 and an inclination of 1° with respect to the ecliptic.

== Discovery ==
Inna was officially discovered on 5 September 1915, by Georgian–Russian astronomer Grigory Neujmin at the Simeiz Observatory on the Crimean peninsula. Four nights later, it was independently discovered by Max Wolf at Heidelberg Observatory on 9 September 1915, which is also the beginning of the body's observation arc. The Minor Planet Center, however, only credits the first astronomer with the discovery. The asteroid was first observed by Wolf as A905 YA at Heidelberg on 27 December 1905.

== Naming ==
This minor planet was named after Inna Nikolaevna Leman-Balanovskaya (1881–1945), a Russian astronomer at the Pulkovo Observatory near St Petersburg, Russia. The naming was not mentioned in The Names of the Minor Planets by Paul Herget in 1955. Lutz Schmadel, the author of the Dictionary of Minor Planet Names learned about the origin of the minor planet's name from private communications with astronomer Nikolai Chernykh (1931–2004), who worked as an astrometricist and Solar System dynamicist at the Crimean Astrophysical Observatory.

== Physical characteristics ==
In the Tholen-like taxonomy of the Small Solar System Objects Spectroscopic Survey (S3OS2), Inna is a common carbonaceous C-type asteroid, while in the survey's SMASS-like taxonomic variant, it is a Cb-subtype, transitioning to the somewhat brighter B-type asteroids. The Themis family has a "CB" overall spectral type. As of 2020, no rotational lightcurve of Inna has been obtained from photometric observations. The body's rotation period, pole and shape remain unknown.

=== Diameter and albedo ===
According to the survey carried out by the NEOWISE mission of NASA's Wide-field Infrared Survey Explorer (WISE), Inna measures 33.027±0.130 kilometers in diameter and its surface has an albedo of 0.069±0.012. Alternative mean-diameters published by the WISE team include (34.288±10.621 km) and (36.842±1.035 km) with corresponding albedos of (0.042±0.025) and (0.043±0.014).
