= Celletti =

Celletti is a surname. Notable people with the surname include:

- Alessandra Celletti (born 1966), Italian pianist, vocalist, songwriter, and composer
- Alessandra Celletti (mathematician) (born 1962), Italian mathematician
- Rodolfo Celletti (1917–2004), Italian musicologist, critic, voice teacher, and novelist
