= Boris Garfinkel =

American astronomer

Boris Garfinkel (1904–1999) was an American astronomer. Among other honors, he won the Brouwer Award in 1981.
