= Inna Nikolaevna Leman-Balanovskaja =

Russian astronomer (1881–1945)

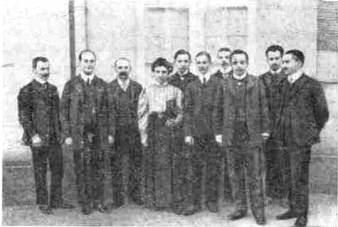
- I. N. Leman-Balanovskaja around 1906 (center)
- Born: 30 June 1881; Pavlovsk, Saint Petersburg, Russian Empire
- Died: April 1945 (aged 63–64)
- Burial place: Tashkent, Uzbekistan
- Education: Bestuzhev Courses
- Occupation: Senior researcher at the Pulkovo Observatory

Inna Nikolaevna Leman-Balanovskaja (Russian: И́нна Никола́евна Ле́ман-Балано́вская; 30 June 1881 – April 1945) was a Russian and Soviet astronomer who was a senior researcher at Pulkovo Observatory. Her published research included work on variable stars and stellar spectroscopy. She was arrested by the Soviet government in 1935 under fabricated charges, and served five years in a hard labor camp.

== Early life and education ==
Leman-Balanovskaja was born in Pavlovsk, Saint Petersburg (known at the time as Slutsk) to a noble family. Her father was a high ranking employee of a Russian government ministry. She graduated from high school in 1899 and was enrolled in the Physics and Mathematics Department of the Higher Women's Bestuzhev Courses. She worked as a mathematician for the State Hydrological Institute in Saint Petersburg, and occasionally attended astronomy classes at Sorbonne University in Paris. She moved to Göttingen in Germany to study astrophysics in 1906, and graduated with a Doctor of Philosophy in 1910 from the University of Göttingen under her professor Karl Schwarzschild.

== Arrest ==
In the 1930s, she worked at Pulkovo Observatory outside of Saint Petersburg. The observatory was targeted between 1936 and 1937 by the Soviet government for an alleged connection with Trotskyist-Zinovievist, a Soviet-designated terrorist organization. Leman-Balanovskaja was arrested on 7 September 1935 for fabricated charges in relation to the Pulkovo case alongside dozens of other scientists working at the observatory. She was sentenced two days later to five years in a labor camp in Siberia (Siblag NKVD), where she resided until her release in 1943.

== Death and legacy ==
Leman-Balanovskaja had made plans to travel to Crimea in 1945, but had to stop in Tashkent after she contracted typhus. She died there from her illness and was buried nearby.

An asteroid (848 Inna) was named after Leman-Balanovskaja to recognize her contributions to the field.

== Works ==
Leman-Balanovskaja had produced several papers, books and translations throughout her career, some of which being:

- Ueber die systematische Bewegung der Sterne (Dissertation), Göttingen, 1911.
- Ueber die relative Intensitätsäinderung einiger Linien im Spectrum von δ Cephei, 1913 (Izv. GAO, vol. 5, no. 59).
- Ueber die relative Intensitätsäinderung der Linien im Spectrum von δ Cephei und S Gemin., 1914 (Izv. Acad. Sciences).
- Recherches sur les elements de l'orbite de l'étoile Polaire d'aprés des spectrogrammes prizes à Poulcovo, 1914. Izv. GAO, No. 65.
- On the spectrum of Nova Cygni, 1920. Collection of articles, GAO, Petrograd.
- On the spectrum of Nova Aquilae (1918–1924), Petrograd, Izv. GAO. v.9.
- The position of comet 1919 III (Comet Brorsen-Metkoff 1847 V, independently discovered by Selivanov) during its secondary appearance on 1 August 1919). Collection of articles, GAO, No. 1, 1920.
- Die vorläufige Elemente des Verändlichen XY Cassiopeiae, Astronom. Nachrichten, 1925.
- Ueber die Elemente des Spectraldoppelsterns α Geminorum (Izvestia of the State Administrative District, 1925).
- Ueber die Scheinbare Verteilung des Sterne des Spectraltypen M und K5 (1928, Astronom. Nachrichten).
- Die Eigenbewegungen der Sterne im offenen Sternhaufen NGC 6885 und in seiner Umgebung (Izvestia of the State Administrative District, 1930).
- Catalog der photographischen Grossen der Sterne der Potsdam. Photometrischen Durchmusterung in der Zone + 57°.5 — + 77°.5. 1932, Bulletin de l'Observatoire à Poulcovo.
- Photographic Light Curves of the Variable VW and UZ Cassiopeiae (Poulc. Circ., 1932).
- New variable stars in Perseus. (Poulc. Circul., 1934).
- Nine new variables in Taurus. (Poulc. Circul., 1936), No. 16.
- Investigation of a dark nebula near ξ Persei, Izv. GAO No. 118, 1935.
- Translation of the book by H. Shapley and H. Curtis "The Dimensions of the Universe", Pg., 1924.
