= 762 Pulcova =

Main-belt asteroid

- 762 Pulcova and satellite as seen with adaptive optics in 2000

Discovery
- Discovered by: G. N. Neujmin
- Discovery date: 3 September 1913

Designations
- Pronunciation: /ˈpʊlkəvə/
- Named after: Pulkovo Heights
- Alternative designations: 1913 SQ
- Minor planet category: Main belt
- Adjectives: Pulcovian /pʊlˈkoʊviən/

Orbital characteristics
- Epoch 31 July 2016 (JD 2457600.5)
- Uncertainty parameter 0
- Observation arc: 100.08 yr (36553 d)
- Aphelion: 3.4801 AU (520.62 Gm) (Q)
- Perihelion: 2.8291 AU (423.23 Gm) (q)
- Semi-major axis: 3.1546 AU (471.92 Gm) (a)
- Eccentricity: 0.10319 (e)
- Orbital period (sidereal): 5.60 yr (2046.5 d)
- Mean anomaly: 348.62° (M)
- Mean motion: 0° 10^{m} 33.276^{s} / day (n)
- Inclination: 13.089° (i)
- Longitude of ascending node: 305.76° (Ω)
- Argument of perihelion: 189.54° (ω)
- Known satellites: S/2000 (762) 1
- Earth MOID: 1.84297 AU (275.704 Gm)
- Jupiter MOID: 1.60162 AU (239.599 Gm)
- T_{Jupiter}: 3.158

Physical characteristics
- Mean diameter: 136±10 km
- Mass: (1.865±0.019)×10^{18} kg
- Mean density: 1.4±0.2 g/cm^{3}
- Synodic rotation period: 5.839 h (0.2433 d)
- Sidereal rotation period: 5.839 hr
- Geometric albedo: 0.0458±0.002
- Apparent magnitude: 11.93 to 14.79
- Absolute magnitude (H): 8.28

762 Pulcova is a binary main-belt asteroid. It was discovered by Grigoriy N. Neujmin in 1913, and is named after Pulkovo Observatory, near Saint Petersburg. Pulcova is 137 km in diameter, and is a C-type asteroid, which means that it is dark in colouring with a carbonate composition.

Photometric observations of this asteroid from Leura, Australia during 2006 gave a light curve with a period of 5.8403 ± 0.0005 hours and a brightness variation of 0.20 ± 0.02 in magnitude. This result is in agreement with previous studies.

== Satellite ==
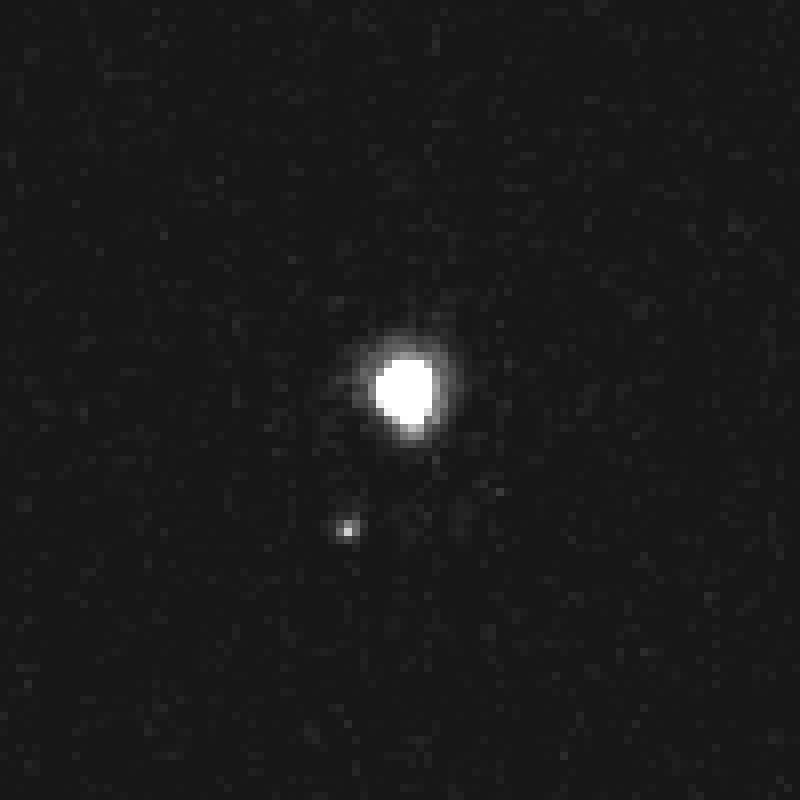
Pulcova and its satellite imaged by the Hubble Space Telescope in January 2005

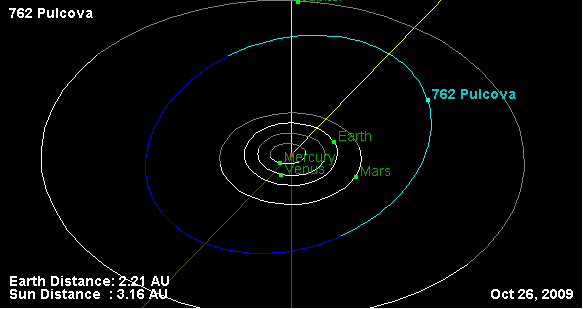
Diagram of 762 Pulcova's orbit

On February 22, 2000, astronomers at the Canada–France–Hawaii Telescope on Mauna Kea, Hawaii, discovered a 15-km moon (roughly a tenth the size of the primary) orbiting Pulcova at a distance of 800 km. Its orbital period is 4 days. The satellite is about 4 magnitudes fainter than the primary. It was one of the first asteroid moons to be identified.

== Density ==
In the year 2000, Merline estimated Pulcova to have a density of 1.8 g/cm^{3}, which would make it more dense than the triple asteroid 45 Eugenia, and binary 90 Antiope. But estimates by Marchis in 2008 suggest a density of only 0.90 g/cm^{3}, suggesting it may be a loosely packed rubble pile, not a monolithic object.
