= E. Myles Standish =

Mathematical astronomer

- Born: March 5, 1939 (age 87)
- Education: Wesleyan University: BA, MA; Yale University: PhD
- Scientific career
- Workplaces: Yale University, Caltech/JPL
- Thesis: Numerical Studies of the Gravitational Problem of N Bodies (1968)
- Doctoral advisor: Victor G. Szebehely

Erland Myles Standish Jr. (born March 5, 1939) is a mathematical astronomer largely working in the field of solar system dynamics and celestial mechanics. He is a former professor at Yale University and had worked for the Jet Propulsion Laboratory.

== Work ==
Standish worked on the Jet Propulsion Laboratory Development Ephemeris.

Early versions refined the accuracy of these fundamental astronomical data-sets by including many recent and accurate observational data, new types of data, using improved data processing methods, including refined equations of motion which more accurately described the actual physics of the Solar System. With the inclusion of the lunar work of J. G. Williams and others, improved solar, planetary and lunar ephemerides were developed (in Dev. Eph. 102) far enough to have a significant historical as well as current coverage.

Later versions of the Development Ephemerides include Development Ephemeris DE200, which was officially used in the Astronomical Almanac (and in derived form, also in the Nautical Almanac) as the basis for the ephemerides of sun, moon and planets from 1984 through 2002; and DE405, which has been the basis of the corresponding ephemerides in the Astronomical Almanac and Nautical Almanac from and including 2003, to the present date.

Later examples of the Development Ephemerides supported the navigation of specific NASA planetary space missions with precise results.

Standish's work towards the development of the ephemerides took him also into the field of the history of astronomy, including study of the recently noted occurrence of Neptune in the notes of Galileo, identifying an additional manuscript observation of Neptune by Galileo (who had regarded it as a background star while studying the satellites of Jupiter), and analyzing its significance for the modern-day ephemerides.

Standish has collaborated with Dr. Elena V. Pitjeva and Dr. Agnes Fienga on the topic of a better determination of the Astronomical Unit and of the masses of the asteroids. Standish has also dealt with the Pioneer Anomaly issue by modeling it in a modified version of the usual ephemerides and fitting such a new dynamical theory of planetary motions to the usual, well-established observational data set.

== Awards ==
In 2008, Standish received the NASA Distinguished Service Medal; in 2015, he was given Wesleyan University's Distinguished Alumnus Award.

== Bibliometric information ==
According to the NASA ADS database, Standish's h-index is 21, with a total number of citations, self-citations being excluded, equal to 2003.
