= Vladislav Shevchenko =

Russian astronomer

Vladislav Vladimirovich Shevchenko (Russian: Владислав Владимирович Шевченко, June 18, 1940 - April 12, 2026) was a Russian astronomer who specialized in lunar exploration. He was the Head of Department of Lunar and Planetary Research, Sternberg State Astronomical Institute, Moscow State University.

Positions in Professional Organizations:

- 1978–present time - Chairman of the Lunar Task Group of the International Astronomical Union's Working Group for Planetary System Nomenclature, member of the Working Group.
- 1991-1995 - member of the Task Committee on Lunar Base Structures of American Society of Civil Engineers.
- 1978-1997 - Chairman of the Lunar and Mercury Working Group of Astronomical Council, Russian Academy of Sciences.
- 1989-1993 - member of International Design for Extreme Environment Association (IDEEA).
- 1993-1997 - Editorial Board member of Solar System research (Periodical of Russian Academy of Sciences) .
- 1990-1997 - Editorial Board member of The Earth and the Universe (Periodical of Russian Academy of Sciences).
- Member of International Astronomical Union (Commission 16).
- Member of Astronomical society (International).
- Member of International Union of Geodesy and Geophysics.
- Member of COSPAR.
