= Feodosy Krasovsky =

Soviet astronomer and geodesist

Feodosy Nikolayevich Krasovsky
- Феодосий Николаевич Красовский
- Born: 26 September [O.S. 14 September] 1878; Galich, Russian Empire
- Died: October 1, 1948; Moscow, Soviet Union
- Education: Mezhevoy (land surveying) Institute (Moscow)
- Occupations: Astronomer and geodesist

Feodosy Nikolayevich Krasovsky (Russian: Феодосий Николаевич Красовский; 26 September [O.S. 14 September] 1878 – October 1, 1948) was a Russian and Soviet astronomer and geodesist. He was born in Galich. In 1900 he graduated from the Mezhevoy (land surveying) Institute in Moscow; in 1907 he began working as a lecturer there.

== Research work ==
At the end of 1928 the Central Research Institute of Geodesy, Aerial Surveying and Cartography (TsNIIGAiK) was founded on his initiative; he worked there as a director (1928–1930) and as a deputy director of science (1930–1937). Between 1924 and 1930 Krasovsky headed astronomical, geodetical and cartographical works in the Soviet Union. He worked out the theory and methods of construction of the national geodetical network of the USSR and solved related problems of topography and gravimetry works. Krasovsky and another Soviet geodesist, Aleksandr Aleksandrovich Izotov, in 1940 defined dimensions of an ellipsoid which was named the Krasovsky ellipsoid and was later used as a reference ellipsoid in the Soviet Union and other countries until the 1990s.

In 1939 Krasovsky became the Corresponding Member of the Academy of Sciences of the Soviet Union.

Krasovsky died in Moscow in 1948.

== Awards ==
- Stalin Prize (1943, 1952 – posthumously)
- Order of Lenin (1945)
- Order of the Red Banner of Labour

In 2024 the Government of the Russian Federation established a prize in the field of geodesy and cartography in honor of Feodosiy Nikolaevich Krasovsky.

== See also ==
- SK-42 reference system
