= Alessandra Celletti (mathematician) =

Italian mathematician

- Born: 12 February 1962 (age 64); Rome
- Education: ETH
- Awards: Brouwer Award (Division on Dynamical Astronomy)
- Scientific career
- Fields: Mathematics
- Institutions: University of Rome Tor Vergata
- Thesis: Analysis of Resonances in the Spin-Orbit Problem in Celestial Mechanics (1989)
- Doctoral advisor: Jürgen Moser; Jörg Waldvogel
- Website: https://alessandracelletti.github.io/

Alessandra Celletti (born 12 February 1962) is an Italian mathematician.

== Education and career ==
Celletti earned a master's degree in mathematics in 1984 at the University of Rome La Sapienza, and a PhD in 1989 at the Swiss Federal Institute of Technology in Zurich (ETH) under the supervision of Jürgen Moser and Jörg Waldvogel.

She worked from 1990 to 1999 at University of l'Aquila. In 1999 she moved at the University of Rome Tor Vergata, where she was appointed in 2016 full professor of Mathematical Physics.

Since 2001 she has worked with the Mathematics Genology Project, an online project to highlight the accomplishments of those who complete a doctorate in Mathematics in association with the American Mathematical Society.

== Research ==
Celletti's research activity concerns dynamical systems, Kolmogorov–Arnold–Moser (KAM) theory, and celestial mechanics.

Her book "Stability and Chaos in Celestial Mechanics" has been adapted as the staple for advanced physics and mathematics classes.

Since 2016 she has been editor-in-chief of the journal Celestial Mechanics and Dynamical Astronomy.

== Other academic and institutional roles ==
Since 1993 Celletti has coordinated the international CELMEC meetings.

She is a founding member of the Italian Society of Celestial Mechanics and Astrodynamics, which she chaired from 2001 to 2013.

Since 2010 she has been an honorary "Celestial Mechanics Institute" member.

Since 2012 she has been a member of the Scientific Committee of the European Women in Mathematics. Since 2017 she has chaired the Women in Mathematics Committee of the European Mathematical Society.

In 2015 she was elected vice-President and in 2018 became President of the Scientific Committee in Celestial Mechanics of the International Astronomical Union till 2021.

Since April 2020 she is member of the Governing Board and Vice-President of ANVUR (the Italian National Agency for the Evaluation of Universities and Research Institutes).

== Prizes and awards ==
In 2007, her book Ordine e caos nel sistema solare in collaboration with Ettore Perozzi was a finalist for the Galileo prize for popular science.

The asteroid 2005 DJ1 has been named in her honour (117539 Celletti).

In 2012 she was an invited speaker at the 6th European Congress of Mathematics as well as a key speaker at the 2012 European Women in Mathematics conference.

In 2023, Alessandra Celletti won the Brouwer Career Award from the Division on Dynamical Astronomy of the American Astronomical Society.
