= Inna Sergeyevna Shcherbina-Samoylova =

Soviet and Russian astronomer

- Инна Сергеевна Щербина-Самойлова
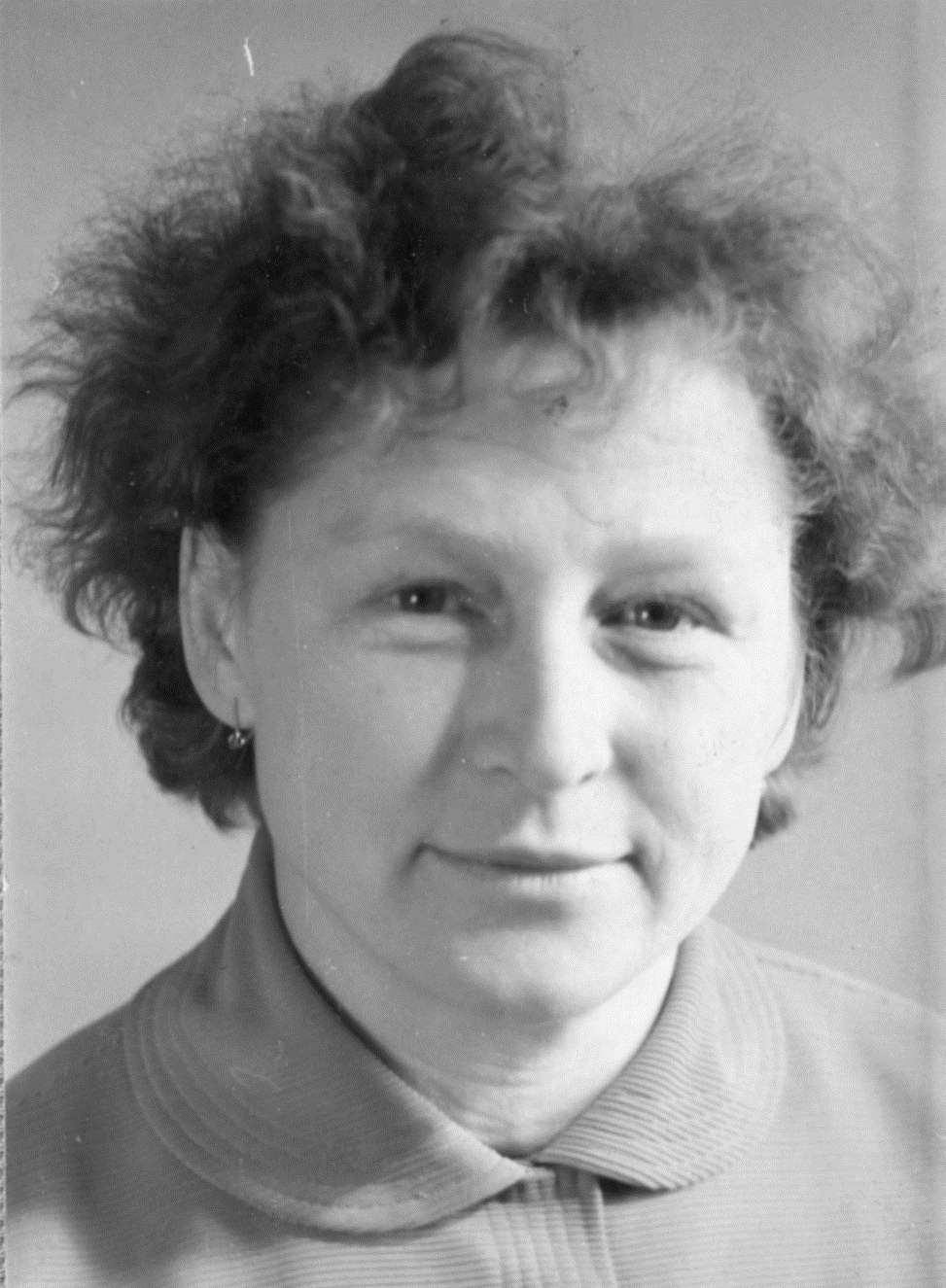
- Inna Sergeyevna Shcherbina-Samoylova in the 1950s
- Born: 17 January 1922; Moscow, Soviet Russia
- Died: 26 April 2003 (aged 81); Moscow, Russia
- Education: Moscow State University
- Known for: Contributions to astronomical information science
- Awards: Order of the Patriotic War (2nd class); Order of the Badge of Honour
- Scientific career
- Fields: Astronomy, Astrophysics, Information science

Inna Sergeyevna Shcherbina-Samoylova (17 January 1922 – 26 April 2003) was a Soviet and Russian astronomer, astrophysicist, and specialist in information science. She made significant contributions to astronomical information science in the Soviet Union and Russia.

== Early life and education ==
Shcherbina-Samoylova was born on 17 January 1922 in Moscow, Soviet Russia. In 1940, she graduated with honors from Moscow Secondary School No. 518 and enrolled in the Mechanics and Mathematics Faculty of Moscow State University, specializing in astronomy.

== Military service ==
In May 1942, during World War II, Shcherbina-Samoylova joined the Red Army through a Komsomol mobilization. After completing a two-month course at the Field Post Office Administration, she was assigned to active duty in postal services, achieving the rank of junior lieutenant. In 1943, she was demobilized and resumed her studies at MSU.

== Academic and professional career ==
After graduating from MSU in 1947, Shcherbina-Samoylova worked at the Sternberg Astronomical Institute. From 1948 to 1951, she pursued postgraduate studies in astrophysics at MSU and, in 1952, defended her thesis, earning the degree of Candidate of Physical and Mathematical Sciences.

Between 1951 and 1953, she lectured at the Moscow Planetarium. In April 1953, she began working at the All-Union Institute of Scientific and Technical Information (VINITI) of the Academy of Sciences of the Soviet Union, where she remained until December 2000, holding various research and editorial positions.

Shcherbina-Samoylova participated in expeditions to observe total solar eclipses, including ones near Buzuluk in 1961 and in Ossora, Kamchatka Krai in 1972. She was deputy editor-in-chief of the joint editorial board for abstract publications on astronomy and geodesy at VINITI, overseeing the publication of journals such as Astronomy and Geodesy and Aerial Photography.

== International involvement ==
In 1970, Shcherbina-Samoylova was elected a member of the International Astronomical Union and participated in its symposia. She was also involved in the International Federation for Information and Documentation, serving as vice-president of its Central Classification Committee from 1979.

== Editorial and translation work ==
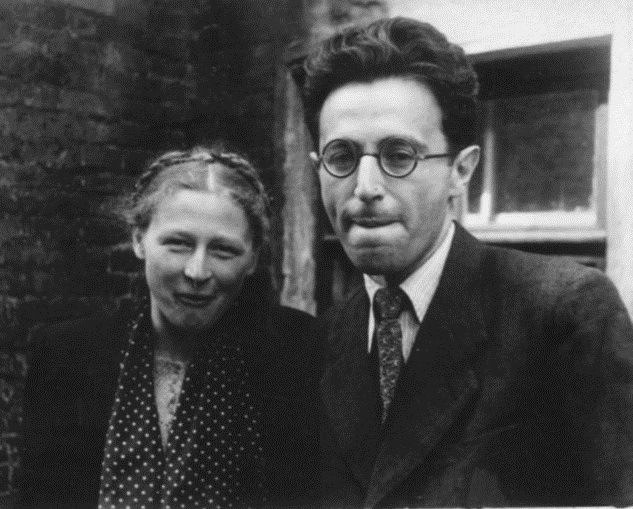
Shcherbina-Samoylova with fellow astronomer Iosif Shklovsky in the 1950s. Shklovsky edited a number of Shcherbina-Samoylova's translated works.

Shcherbina-Samoylova was an editor and translator of scientific works on astronomy. She translated Elementary Astronomy by Otto Struve, Beverly Turner Lynds, and Helen Pillans, which became widely used in the Soviet Union. Over her career, she published approximately 70 scientific papers.

== Awards and honors ==
- Order of the Patriotic War (2nd class)
- Order of the Badge of Honour

== Death ==
Shcherbina-Samoylova died on 26 April 2003 in Moscow. Her ashes are interred in the columbarium of the Donskoye Cemetery.
