= Aleksandr Mikhailov (astronomer) =

Russian astronomer (1888–1983)

Aleksandr Aleksandrovich Mikhailov (April 26, 1888 – September 29, 1983) was a Russian astronomer who was a member of the Soviet Academy of Sciences. He worked at Pulkovo Observatory from 1947 to 1982. He was its director until 1964 and is credited with leading its post-war revival after the fall of Leningrad.

== Career ==
Born April 26, 1888, in Morshansk, one of Mikhailov's first published papers concerned the appearance of Halley's Comet.

After Joseph Stalin ordered the reconstruction of the Pulkovo Observatory, after having ordered its destruction, Mikhailov played a pivotal in the work leading up to its official reopening in May 1954. Its research mission included observing and forecasting solar activity as well as various projects that could take advantage of the radio astronomy instruments.

Mikhailov's opinion on a wide variety of astronomy topics was sought throughout his career. In 1959, he was quoted in a Time article about Soviet Moon exploration by Luna 3, which sent photographs of the Moon to Earth via radio transmission. "The next step in lunar exploration," he said in the interview, "would be to land a station on the moon without damaging the instruments". He had weighed in that same year on the Cold War space race, stating that "The biggest problem," for human space exploration, he told a Time reporter in January of that same year, "is safe return, and they do not intend to risk a man until they are sure of getting him back alive".

In addition to his career as an astronomer, he translated many key scientific works into Russian.

Colleagues remembered him as "open-hearted and honest and demanded the same of others".

== Personal life and legacy ==
Mikhailov married Zdenka J. Kadla in 1946. She was also an astronomer who worked at the observatory and published work about the Moon. The couple had one son.

He had a passion for optical devices and reportedly had a large collection of photographic equipment. He is remembered as being conversant in a wide number of subjects including music, literature, and art.

Mikhailov died in his home at the observatory.

The asteroid 1910 Mikhailov, discovered by Lyudmila Zhuravlyova was named in his honor. It is a main-belt asteroid. He died on September 29, 1983, aged 95.
