= Lia Athanassoula =

Greek astrophysicist, born 1948

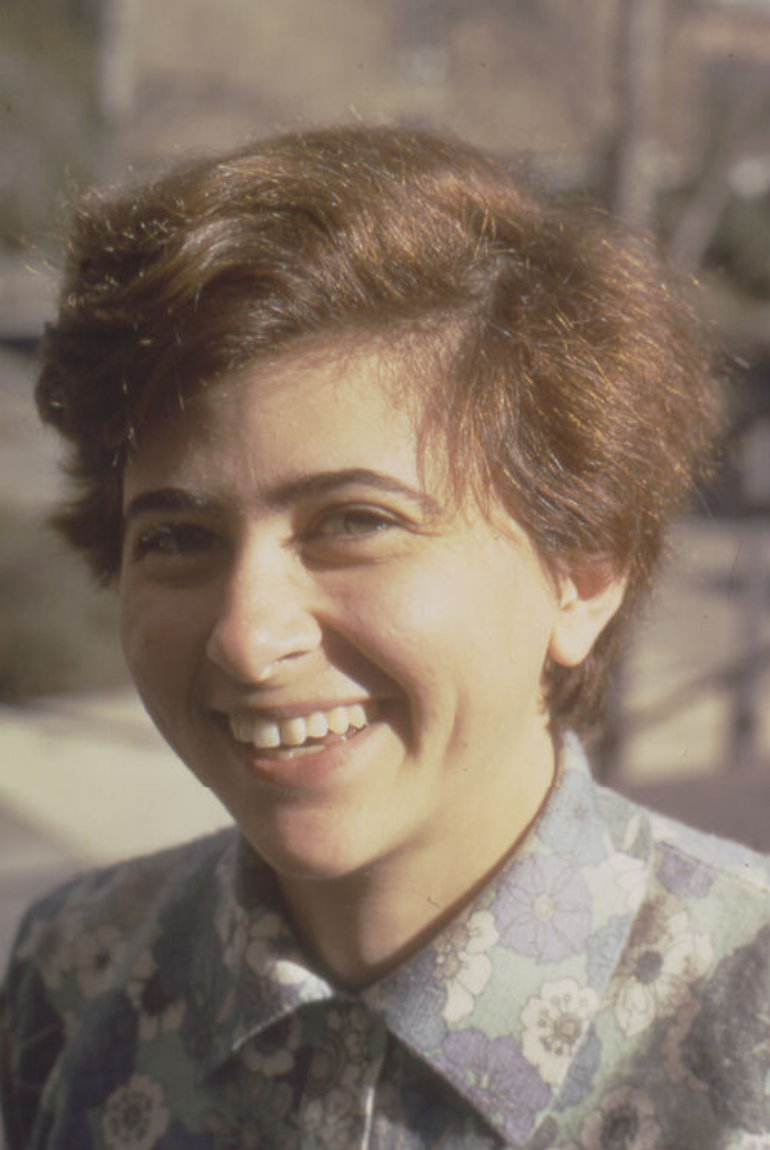
Athanassoula in 1973

Evangelia (Lia) Athanassoula (born 1948) is a retired Greek astrophysicist known for her numerical simulations of the dynamics and structure of disc galaxies, and her studies of the fit between theory and observation for these galaxies.

== Education and career ==
Athanassoula is originally from Athens, and graduated from the University of Athens in 1970 with a bachelor's degree in physics. She went to Aristotle University of Thessaloniki for graduate study, earning a Ph.D. there in 1974, and then earned a French Doctorat d'État at the University of Franche-Comté in 1978.

After research at the National Centre of Scientific Research "Demokritos" from 1971 to 1974, Besançon Astronomical Observatory in 1976 and from 1978 to 1983, and European Southern Observatory in 1977, in 1983 she joined the Laboratoire d'Astrophysique de Marseille, a joint research laboratory of the CNRS National Institute of Sciences of the Universe and of Aix-Marseille University. She retired in 2016.

== Recognition ==
The Academy of Athens gave Athanassoula their Fotinos Prize in 2005, and elected her as a corresponding member in 2020. She was the 2011 winner of the Brouwer Award of the American Astronomical Society, which in 2020 elected her as a Legacy Fellow.
