= Victor Szebehely =

American scientist (1921 – 1997)

Victor G. Szebehely
- Born: Victor G. Szebehely; August 21, 1921; Budapest, Hungary
- Died: September 13, 1997 (aged 76); Austin, Texas, U.S.
- Known for: Apollo program
- Awards: Knight of the Order of Orange-Nassau (1957); Dirk Brouwer Award (1978)
- Scientific career
- Fields: Orbital mechanics, celestial mechanics, astrodynamics
- Institutions: General Electric, Yale University, Royal Netherlands Navy, United States Air Force, NASA, University of Texas at Austin

Victor G. Szebehely (August 21, 1921 – September 13, 1997) was a Hungarian-American astrophysicist, aerospace engineer, and mathematician whose research focused on celestial mechanics, orbital mechanics, and astrodynamics. He was a key figure in the development and success of the Apollo program.

In 1956, a dimensionless number used in time-dependent unsteady flows was named "Szebehely's number," (In the September and October 1977 issues of the journal Celestial Mechanics, volume 16, an equation used to determine the gravitational potential of the Earth, planets, satellites, and galaxies was named "Szebehely's equation").

He worked with General Electric, Yale University, the Royal Netherlands Navy, the United States Air Force, NASA, and the University of Texas at Austin. One of his areas of research was orbital debris and planetary defense against meteor impacts

His first book, The Theory of Orbits, is an important work in orbital mechanics, being the definitive text on the restricted three-body problem as applicable to an Earth-Moon spacecraft system such as Apollo.

He was knighted by Queen Juliana of the Netherlands in 1957.

== History ==
Szebehely was born in Budapest, Hungary. His father was an engineer and he started to study in that field, but switched later to physics. In 1944 he graduated as an engineer from the Budapest University of Technology and Economics.

Because of the threatening communist take over he went to the United States in 1947 and became a naturalized citizen in 1956.

Szebehely authored "Hydrodynamics of Slamming Ships" as David Taylor Model Basin Report 823 in 1952 and co-authored "Ship Slamming in Head Seas" as DTMB Report 913 in 1955.

He was the author of several books.

In 1978 he received the very first Dirk Brouwer Award from the Dynamical Astronomy Division of the American Astronomical Society.

He died in Austin, Texas at age 76.
