= SK-42 reference system =

Soviet geodetic datum

The SK-42 reference system is a geodetic datum established in the Soviet Union in 1942 as Systema koordinat (Russian: Система координат 1942 года). It was used in geodetic calculations, notably in military mapping and determining state borders.

SK-42 is based on the Krasovsky 1940 ellipsoid, a locally best fitting reference ellipsoid named after Feodosy Krasovsky. It has a semi-major axis (equatorial radius) a of 6,378,245 m, and an inverse flattening 1/f of 298.3

SK-42 served as a foundation for developing the SK-63 reference system which was created and used primarily for civilian and industrial development purposes. It was later linked to the geocentric coordinate system PZ-90 via a datum transformation.
