= Kirill Florensky =

Russian Soviet geochemist and planetologist

- Кирилл Флоренский
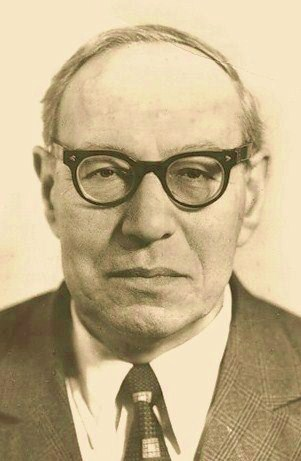
- Born: December 27, 1915; Sergiyev Posad, Russian Empire
- Died: April 9, 1982 (aged 66); Moscow, Soviet Union
- Citizenship: Soviet
- Scientific career
- Fields: Geochemistry, planetary science
- Workplaces: Soviet Academy of Sciences

Kirill Pavlovich Florensky (Russian: Кири́лл Па́влович Флоре́нский; 27 December 1915 – 9 April 1982) was a Russian Soviet geochemist and planetologist. He was head of comparative planetology at the Vernadsky Institute of the Soviet Academy of Sciences.

Florensky was born in Zagorsk during the First World War. He was the second son of the Russian polymath, Pavel Florensky.

The crater Florensky on the Moon is named after him.
