= Institute of Applied Astronomy =

Russian astronomical institute

Institute of Applied Astronomy RAS (IAA RAS)
- Formation: 1987
- Location: Saint Petersburg, Russia
- Coordinates: 59°56′56″N 30°20′42″E
- Official language: Russian
- Director: Dmitry Viktorovich Ivanov
- Staff: about 300
- Website: http://iaaras.ru/en/ (in English) http://iaaras.ru (in Russian)

The Institute of Applied Astronomy of the Russian Academy of Sciences (name in Russian: Институт прикладной астрономии — official name in Russian: Федеральное государственное бюджетное учреждение науки Институт прикладной астрономии Российской академии наук (Federal State Budgetary Institution of Science Institute of Applied Astronomy of the Russian Academy of Sciences) — abbreviated name in Russian: ИПА РАН — abbreviated name in English: IAA RAS) is one of the world's largest astronomical institutes, known for research in ephemeris astronomy, classical and relativistic celestial mechanics, radio astronomy and radio interferometry, space geodesy, fundamental coordinate-time support, and development of new methods in astrometry and geodynamics.

== Directors ==
- 1988–2011 Andrey Mikhailovich Finkelstein
- 2011–2017 Alexander Vasilievich Ipatov
- 2017–present Dmitry Viktorovich Ivanov

== History ==
The institute was formed on November 13, 1987 by the order number 941 of the Presidium of the USSR Academy of Sciences.

In 2012 the type and full name of the institute was changed to Федеральное государственное бюджетное учреждение науки Институт прикладной астрономии Российской академии наук (Federal State Budgetary Institution of Science Institute of Applied Astronomy of the Russian Academy of Sciences), by resolution number 262, dated December 13, 2011, of the Presidium of the Russian Academy of Sciences. The abbreviated name remained the same.

== Main directions of scientific activity ==
- Research in the field of astronomy, ephemeris astronomy and space geodesy.
- Research in the field of terrestrial radio interferometry with very long baselines and radio astronomy.
- Research in the field of classical and relativistic celestial mechanics.
- Research in the field of fundamental coordinate-time support.
- Construction of fundamental reference systems and determination of the parameters of the Earth's rotation.
- Research in the field of radio astronomy and geodetic instrumentation.
- Publication of astronomical and specialized yearbooks, ephemeris of minor planets and other official coordinate-time publications.
- Operation and modernization of software systems for the radio interferometric network "Kvasar-KVO".

== Departments of the Institute ==
=== Department of Radio Astronomy Equipment ===
- Laboratory of antennas and antenna measurements
- Laboratory of radio astronomy receiving devices
- Signal conversion and registration laboratory
- Laboratory of time and frequency
- Correlation processing laboratory
- Laboratory of Information and Computing Systems

=== Department of Radio Astronomy Observations ===
- Radio astronomy observatory "Svetloe" (Priozersky District)
- Radio astronomy observatory "Zelenchukskaya" (Zelenchuksky District)
- Radio astronomy observatory "Badary" (Irkutsk Oblast)
- Department of centralized operation of observatories

=== Department of Fundamental and Applied Astronomy ===
- Laboratory of Ephemeris Astronomy
- Laboratory of Astronomical Yearbooks
- Laboratory of Space Geodesy and Earth Rotation
- Laboratory of Small Bodies of the Solar System
- Group of relativistic celestial mechanics

=== Prototype production ===
- Design and Technology Group

== Publishing activity ==
IAA RAS publishes Russian and international astronomical yearbooks and almanacs containing ephemerides of the Sun, Moon, planets, minor planets, and stars, calculated with maximum accuracy in accordance with the standards approved by the International Astronomical Union.

== Observations ==
The Institute of Applied Astronomy of the Russian Academy of Sciences conducts radio interferometric and radio astronomical observations at radio astronomy observatories of the Kvazar-KVO network under international and Russian programs.

== Location ==
The divisions of the Institute of Applied Astronomy of the Russian Academy of Sciences are located in four constituent entities of the Russian Federation: (St. Petersburg, Leningrad Oblast, Karachay-Cherkess Republic, Republic of Buryatia).

- 191187, St. Petersburg, Kutuzova, Embankment 10
- 197110, St. Petersburg, Zhdanovskaya street, 8
- "Svetloe" radioastronomical observatory
  - Longitude: 29°46'53" E
  - Latitude: 60°31'57" N
  - Address: 188833, Leningradskaya Oblast, Priozerskiy district, village Svetloe
- “Zelenchukskaya” radioastronomical observatory
  - Longitude: 41°33'54" E
  - Latitude: 43°47'18" N
  - Address: 357140, Karachaevo-Circassian Republic, Zelenchukskiy district
- “Badary” radioastronomical observatory
  - Longitude: 102°14'06" E
  - Latitude: 51°46'11" N
  - Address: 671021, Buryatiya Republic, Tunkinskiy district, urochishche Badary
