= Celestial Mechanics and Dynamical Astronomy =

- Discipline: Astronomy, astrophysics
- Language: English
- Edited by: Alessandra Celletti (honorary editor: Sylvio Ferraz-Mello)

Publication details
- Former name: Celestial Mechanics
- History: 1969–present
- Publisher: Springer Nature
- Frequency: bi-monthly
- Impact factor: 1.5 (2025)

Standard abbreviations
- ISO 4: Celest. Mech. Dyn. Astron.
- MathSciNet: Celestial Mech. Dynam. Astronom.

Indexing
- CODEN: CLMCAV
- ISSN: 0923-2958 (print); 1572-9478 (web)
- LCCN: 90656563
- OCLC no.: 263607824

Links
- Journal homepage; Online access

Celestial Mechanics and Dynamical Astronomy is a scientific journal covering the fields of astronomy and astrophysics. It was established as Celestial Mechanics in June 1969. The journal is published by Springer Science+Business Media and the editor-in-chief is Alessandra Celletti (University of Rome Tor Vergata), while Sylvio Ferraz-Mello (University of São Paulo) is honorary editor.

== Abstracting and indexing ==
The journal is abstracted and indexed in:

- Science Citation Index Expanded
- Scopus
- Inspec
- Astrophysics Data System
- Zentralblatt MATH
- ProQuest
- Academic OneFile
- Current Contents/Physical, Chemical and Earth Sciences
- Earthquake Engineering Abstracts
- Engineered Materials Abstracts
- GeoRef
- INIS Atomindex
- International Bibliography of Book Reviews
- International Bibliography of Periodical Literature
- Mathematical Reviews

According to the Journal Citation Reports, the journal has a 2020 impact factor of 1.664.
