= Victor Brumberg =

Russian theoretical physicist

Victor Aleksandrovich Brumberg
- Born: February 12, 1933 (age 93); Moscow, USSR
- Education: Moscow State University; Institute of Theoretical Astronomy of Russian Academy of Sciences
- Awards: USSR State Prize, 1982; Humboldt research award, 1993; Title Honorary Scientist of Russia (by a decree of the President of Russia), 1999; Brouwer Award, 2008
- Scientific career
- Fields: Physicist
- Workplaces: Institute of Theoretical Astronomy of Russian Academy of Sciences, 1958-1987; Institute of Applied Astronomy of Russian Academy of Sciences, 1987-2004

Victor A. Brumberg (born February 12, 1933) is a Russian theoretical physicist specializing in relativistic celestial mechanics and astrometry. He worked as a chief-scientist at the Institute of Applied Astronomy, Russian Academy of Sciences, St. Petersburg. He is noted for his work on general relativity applied to celestial mechanics and ephemerides. He is currently living in the United States of America.

Brumberg has served on the scientific committees for projects under the IAU Commission 4: Ephemerides, Commission 7: Celestial Mechanics & Dynamical Astronomy (President), Commission 31: Time, and Commission 52: Relativity in Fundamental Astronomy. He is also a member of the Academy of Europe. Until 2005, he served as Assistant Editor of the Celestial Mechanics and Dynamical Astronomy Journal. He held visiting positions at the Observatoire de Paris (1991), National Astronomy Observatory of Japan (1992-1993), Tuebingen Technical University (1993-1994), Bureau des Longitudes, and Darmstadt Technical University (2000).

Brumberg has over 100 publications and 6 books, two of which are the highly influential Essential Relativistic Celestial Mechanics (1991) and Analytic Techniques of Celestial Mechanics (1995).

He received the 2008 Brouwer Award from the Division of Dynamic Astronomy of the American Astronomical Society. The Brouwer Award was established to recognize outstanding contributions to the field of Dynamical Astronomy, including celestial mechanics, astrometry, geophysics, stellar systems, galactic and extragalactic dynamics. In 1993, he was visiting professor at the Technische Universität Darmstadt.

== Contributions to celestial mechanics ==
One major contribution to the three body problem was Brumberg's construction of a series of polynomials converging for any real time moment. Brumberg also worked on the theory of special functions of celestial mechanics and perturbation theory, constructing compact analytic theories in purely trigonometric forms.

Brumberg's main contribution was in the formation, development, and use of the general theory of relativity in celestial mechanics. He was the leading developer of methods for recording relativistic effects in the motion of celestial bodies, the propagation of light, and in optical and radio observations. He showed that the relationship between calculated and observed quantities is independent on the choice of coordinates as long as the calculations and observations are with respect to the same coordinate system. Brumberg was also one of the creators of a unified relativistic theory of the motion of planets, a necessary step for the generation of Russian experiments in space. He received the USSR State Prize for this work. In 1994-1997, Brumberg led a group of the IAU that discovered inaccuracies in the IAU resolutions of 1991, and subsequently recommended more accurate implementations of relativistic report systems that were approved in 1997.

== Legacy ==
Brumberg advised 4 Doctors of Science and 18 Candidates of Science, who have gone on to do their own influential research.

Sergei Kopeikin, one of his fellow associates, writes in the book Frontiers in Relativistic Celestial Mechanics, "A key figure of relativistic celestial mechanics of the second half of twentieth century has been Victor A. Brumberg, a scholar who presently lives in Boston (USA) and who is still active in research. Victor A. Brumberg has made a significant contribution to general relativity and the science of relativistic planetary ephemerides of the Solar System. He mentored and inspired many researchers around the globe (including the Editor of this book) to start working in the field of relativistic celestial mechanics. The very term "relativistic celestial mechanics" was introduced by Victor A. Brumberg in his famous monograph "Relativistic Celestial Mechanics" published in 1972 by Nauka (Science) - the main scientific publisher of the USSR - in Moscow. For the next two decades this monograph remained the most authoritative reference and the source of invaluable information for researchers working on relativistic equations of motion and experimental testing of general relativity."

Main-belt asteroid 4916 Brumberg, discovered at the Crimean Astrophysical Observatory in 1970, was named in his honor. The official naming citation was published by the Minor Planet Center on 18 August 1997 (M.P.C. 30475).

== Publications (selection) ==
- V.A. Brumberg, Essential Relativistic Celestial Mechanics. Adam Hilger, London (1991). ISBN 0-7503-0062-0
- V.A Brumberg, Analytical Techniques of Celestial Mechanics. Springer-Verlag, UK, (1995). ISBN 3-540-58782-9
- Dmitry V. Brumberg & V.A. Brumberg, Derivative of Kaula's inclination function. In Celestial Mechanics and Dynamical Astronomy (1995), Springer, Netherlands. ISSN 0923-2958
- V.A. Brumberg & Eugene V. Brumberg, Celestial Dynamics at High Eccentricities. Advances in Astronomy and Astrophysics (1999), Gordon & Breach Science Publishers, UK. ISBN 90-5699-212-0
- Georgij A. Krasinsky and V.A. Brumberg, Secular Increase of Astronomical Unit from Analysis of the Major Planet Motions, and its Interpretation. Celestial Mechanics and Dynamical Astronomy 90: 267–288, (2004).
