= Florensky (crater) =

Lunar impact crater

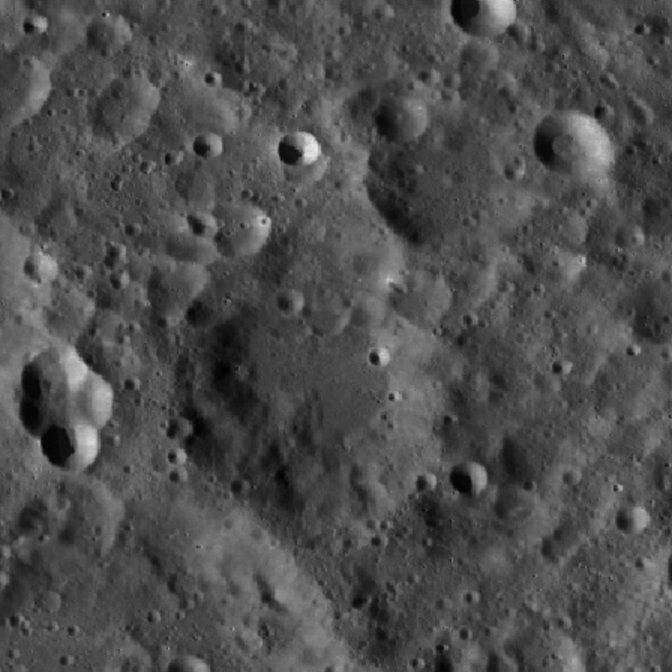
- LRO image
- Coordinates: 25.3°N 131.5°E
- Diameter: 69.03 km (42.89 mi)
- Depth: Unknown
- Colongitude: 229° at sunrise
- Eponym: Kirill P. Florensky

Florensky is a degraded lunar impact crater that is attached to the northeastern rim of the larger crater Vernadskiy. It is located on the far side of the Moon and cannot be directly seen from the Earth. The rim of this crater has been heavily eroded and it forms an irregular ring about the uneven interior.

This crater is named after Soviet geologist Kirill Pavlovich Florensky (1915-1982). It was previously identified as Vernadskiy B before its modern designation was adopted by the International Astronomical Union in 1985.
