= Pulkovo Observatory =

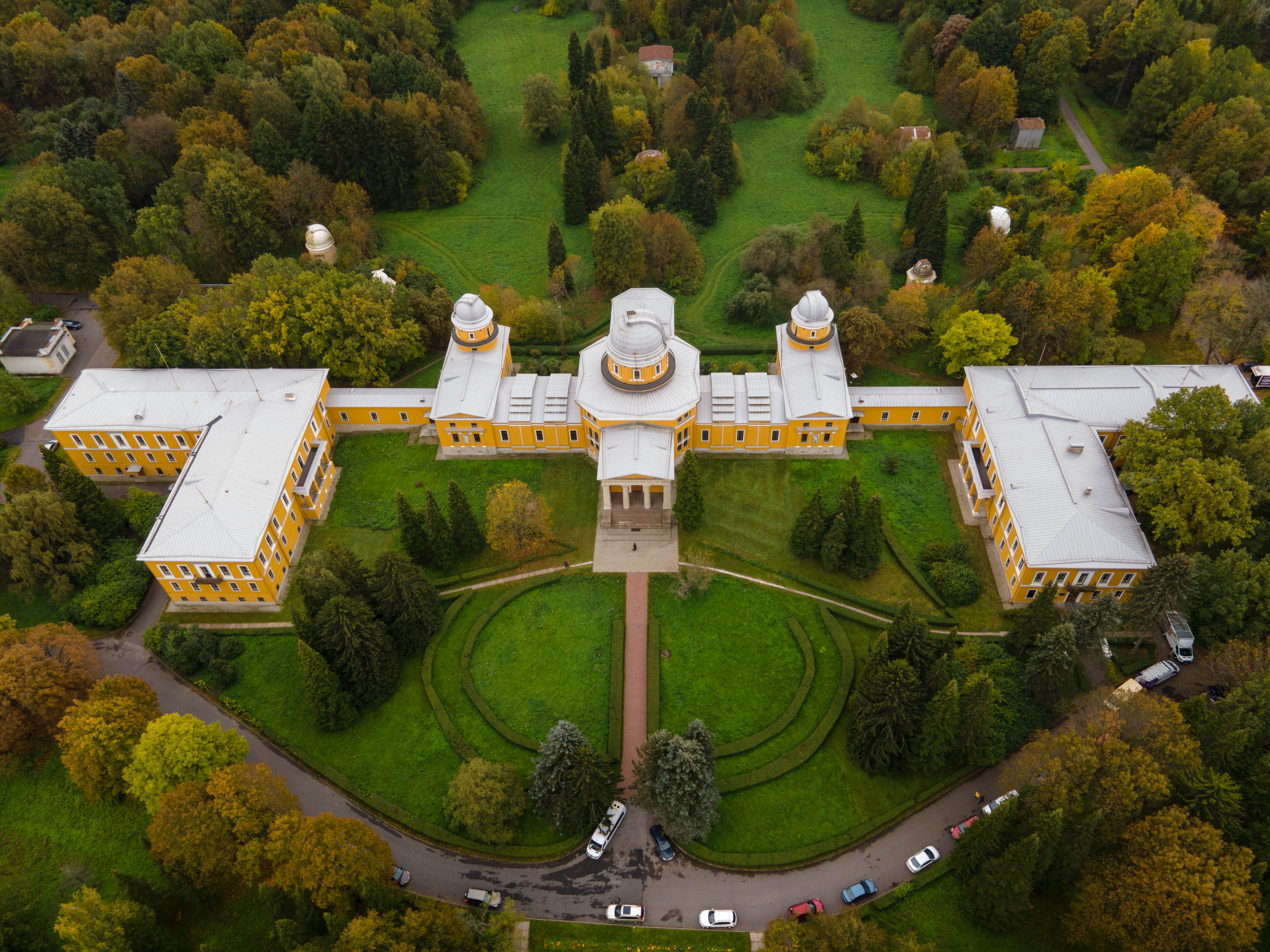
- The Pulkovo Astronomical Observatory, near St. Petersburg
- Alternative names: Central Astronomical Observatory of the Russian Academy of Sciences at Pulkovo
- Observatory code: 084
- Location: Moskovsky District, Saint Petersburg, Saint Petersburg, Russia
- Coordinates: 59°46′18″N 30°19′34″E
- Altitude: 75 m (246 ft)
- Established: 7 August 1839 (in Julian calendar)
- Website: www.gaoran.ru
- Related media on Commons

The Pulkovo Astronomical Observatory (Russian: Пулковская астрономическая обсерватория, romanized: Pulkovskaya astronomicheskaya observatoriya), officially named the Central Astronomical Observatory of the Russian Academy of Sciences at Pulkovo, is the principal astronomical observatory of the Russian Academy of Sciences. It is located 19 km south of Saint Petersburg on Pulkovo Heights 75 metres (246 ft) above sea level. It is part of the UNESCO World Heritage Site Historic Centre of Saint Petersburg and Related Groups of Monuments. It was formerly known as the Imperial Observatory at Pulkowo.

== Early years ==
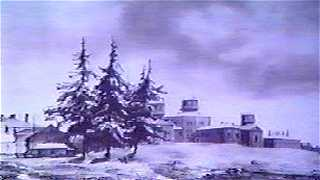
Pulkovo Observatory in 1839

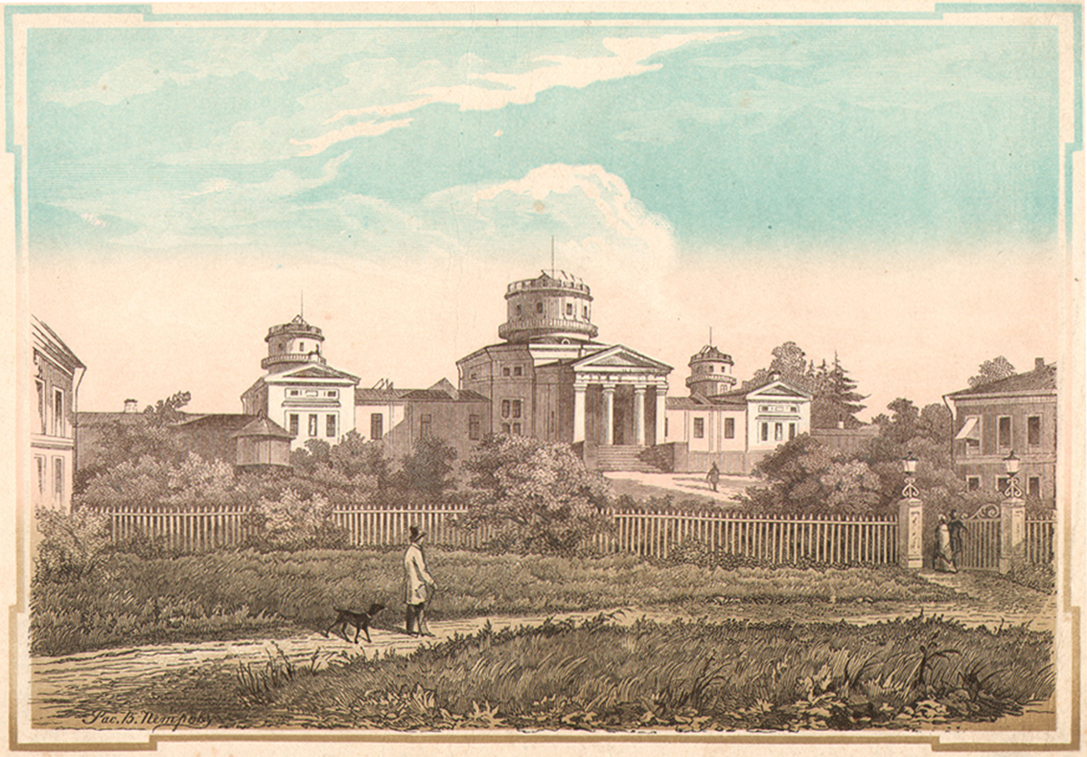
Pulkovo Observatory in 1855. Ev. Bernardsky (1819–1889); Col. Woodcut

The observatory was opened in 1839. Originally, it was a brainchild of the German/Russian astronomer Friedrich Georg Wilhelm von Struve, who would become its first director (his son Otto Wilhelm von Struve succeeding him in 1861). The architect was Alexander Bryullov. The observatory was equipped with state-of-the-art devices, one of them being the a 15-inch (380 mm) aperture refractor, one of the largest refractors in the world at that time (see Great Refractor). In 1885, the observatory was equipped with 30-inch (760 mm) refractor, which was the biggest usable refractor in the world, until the 36-inch (910 mm) telescope at the Lick Observatory in California a few years later. Both were built by Alvan Clark & Sons in Massachusetts. The principal line of work of the observatory consisted of determination of coordinates of stars and astronomical constants, such as precession, nutation, aberration and refraction, and also discovering and measuring double stars. The observatory's activities have also been connected to the geographical study of the territory of Russia and development of navigation. The star catalogues, containing the most precise positions of 374, and then 558 stars, were made for the years 1845, 1865, 1885, 1905 and 1930.

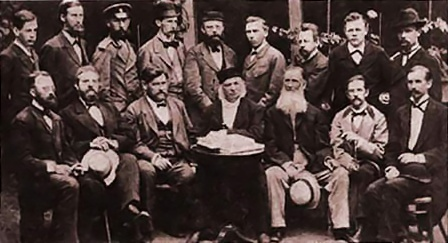
Staff of the Pulkovo Observatory (1883–1886)

By the 50th anniversary of the Observatory, they had built an astrophysical laboratory with a mechanical workshop and installed the Europe's largest refractor, (30 inch). Astrophysical research really gained momentum with the appointment of Feodor Bredikhin as a director of the Observatory in 1890 and transfer of Aristarkh Belopolsky from the Moscow Observatory, an expert in stellar spectroscopy and solar research. In 1923, they installed a big Littrow spectrograph, and in 1940 – a horizontal solar telescope, manufactured at a Leningrad factory. After having received an astrograph in 1894, the observatory began its work on astrophotography. In 1927, the Observatory received a zone astrograph and with its help the Russian astronomers catalogued the stars of the near-polar areas of the sky. Regular observation of movements of celestial poles began with the construction of the zenith telescope in 1904. In 1920, the Observatory started transmitting the exact time by radio signals. The observatory participated in the basic geodesic work, namely in measuring degrees of the arc of the meridian from the Danube to the Arctic Ocean (until 1851), and in triangulation of Spitsbergen in 1899–1901. Military geodesists and hydrographers used to work at the Observatory as interns. The Pulkovo Meridian, which passes through the center of the main building of the Observatory and is located at 30°19,6‘ east of Greenwich, was the point of departure for all former geographical maps of Russia.

In order to observe the southern stars that could not be seen on the observatory's latitude, the scientists organized two affiliated observing locations. One of them was an astrophysical station in the Crimean town of Simeiz (Simeiz Observatory), which had been organized on the basis of a private observatory presented to the Pulkovo Observatory by an astronomy lover N. S. Maltsov in 1908. The other was an astrometric station in Mykolaiv – a former observatory of the Department of the Navy, (today's Nikolaev Astronomical Observatory).

== Great Purge ==
In 1935, Pulkovo Observatory became embroiled in a scandal involving Nikolai M. Voronov, an alleged prodigy whose work on minor planets turned out to be fraudulent. Boris Gerasimovich, Pulkovo's director who had originally hired Voronov and had him work under Naum I. Idel'son, dismissed him on 9 March 1936. Two Pulkovo astronomers, Dmitrii I. Eropkin and Nikolai A. Kozyrev, who had clashed with Gerasimovich previously over administrative complaints and had misappropriated observatory equipment and played practical jokes to earn the ire of Gerasimovich, were dismissed by Gerasimovich the previous day. Their dismissal was for allegedly receiving paycheques from both the observatory and the Academy of Sciences. Kozyrev and Eropkin used the Voronov scandal to campaign for Gerasimovich's removal and their reinstatement, with the 4 June 1936 issue of Leningradskaia pravda publicising the Voronov scandal and alleging that Gerasimovich had hired Voronov only because the latter's work had been published by a German scientific journal. Leningradskaia pravda published a further attack on Pulkovo in July 1936, accusing Pulkovo of servility to foreign science, and yet another on 27 August 1936 accusing Pulkovo's assistant director for administrative affairs, B. A. Shigin, of being a Trotskyite agent. This August 1936 issue of Leningradskaia pravda also alleged Gerasimovich had covered up the Voronov scandal.

As Pulkovo became the subject of controversy that increasingly became national news, the Pulkovo astronomer Boris Numerov was arrested by the NKVD on 20 October 1936 after a disgruntled graduate student who had failed a candidacy exam administered by Numerov denounced him. Following repeated beatings, the NKVD extracted a fabricated confession from Numerov that he had been cooperating with Nazi Germany and engaging in espionage and "wrecking". On the night of 6-7 November 1936, known as the "Night of the Long Knives of Soviet astronomy", the NKVD arrested en masse several of Pulkovo's astronomers, including Vera F. Gaze, Petr I. Iashnov, Innokentii A. Balanovskii, Nikolai V. Komendant, Idel'son, and Kozyrev. Following up this mass arrest was the further arrest on 4 December 1936 of Eropkin and Nikolai I. Dneprovskii, two other Pulkovo astronomers, and on 10 February 1937 of Maksimilian M. Musselius, Pulkovo's scientific secretary. A number of committees were formed to investigate alleged political and philosophical offences at the observatory on which sat Vartan Ter-Oganezov, an anti-relativity ideologue who recommended negative action against the observatory.

On 25 May 1937, almost all the arrested Pulkovo astronomers were sentenced by a military tribunal to ten years of imprisonment. Gerasimovich would be arrested at the end of June 1937 and was executed immediately after his show trial in November 1937.

== Later history ==
During the siege of Leningrad (1941–1944), the Observatory became the target of fierce German air raids and artillery bombardment. All of the buildings were completely destroyed. Under dramatic circumstances, the main instruments were saved and stored safely in Leningrad, including the lens of the destroyed 30-inch refractor, and a significant part of the unique library with manuscripts and important works from the 15th to 19th century. On February 5, 1997, nearly 1,500 of the 3,852 books were destroyed by malicious arson and the rest of the library items were damaged by flames, smoke or water.

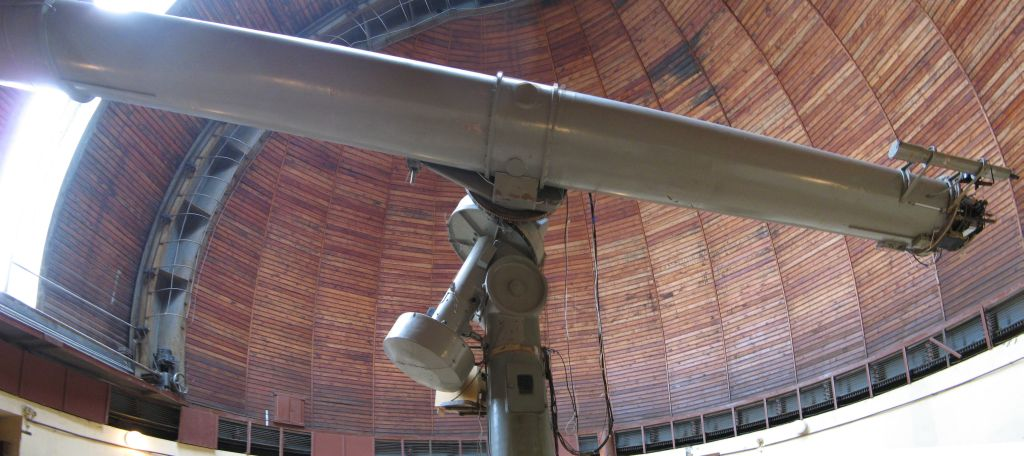
The 65 cm Zeiss (25.59 inches) achromatic refractor of Pulkovo observatory

Even before the end of the war, the Soviet government made a decision to restore the Observatory. In 1946, it began the construction after having cleared the territory. In May 1954, the Observatory was re-opened, not only having been restored but considerably expanded in terms of instruments, employees and research subjects. New departments had been created, such as the Department of Radio Astronomy and Department of Instrument Making (with its own optical and mechanical workshop). The surviving old instruments were repaired, modernized and put into service once again. Also installed were new instruments, such as the 26-inch (660 mm) refractor, a horizontal meridian device, a photographic polar telescope, a big zenith telescope, stellar interferometer, two solar telescopes, coronagraph, a big radio telescope and a variety of labware. The 65 cm Zeiss refractor was originally intended as a gift from then Chancellor of Germany Adolf Hitler to the Italian Benito Mussolini, but it was not delivered and instead was recovered by the Soviet Union.

The Simeiz station became a part of the new Crimean Astrophysical Observatory of the Soviet Academy of Sciences in 1945. They also built the Kislovodsk Mountain Astronomical Station and a laboratory in Blagoveshchensk. The observatory organized many expeditions for determining differences of longitudes, observing passages of Venus and solar eclipses, and studying astroclimate. In 1962, the Observatory sent an expedition to Chile to observe stars in the southern skies.

== Gallery ==
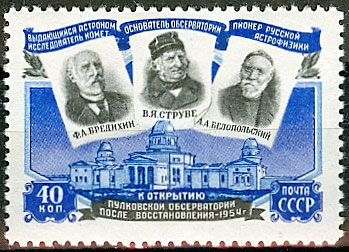
Soviet postage stamp, 1954, marking the restoration of the observatory

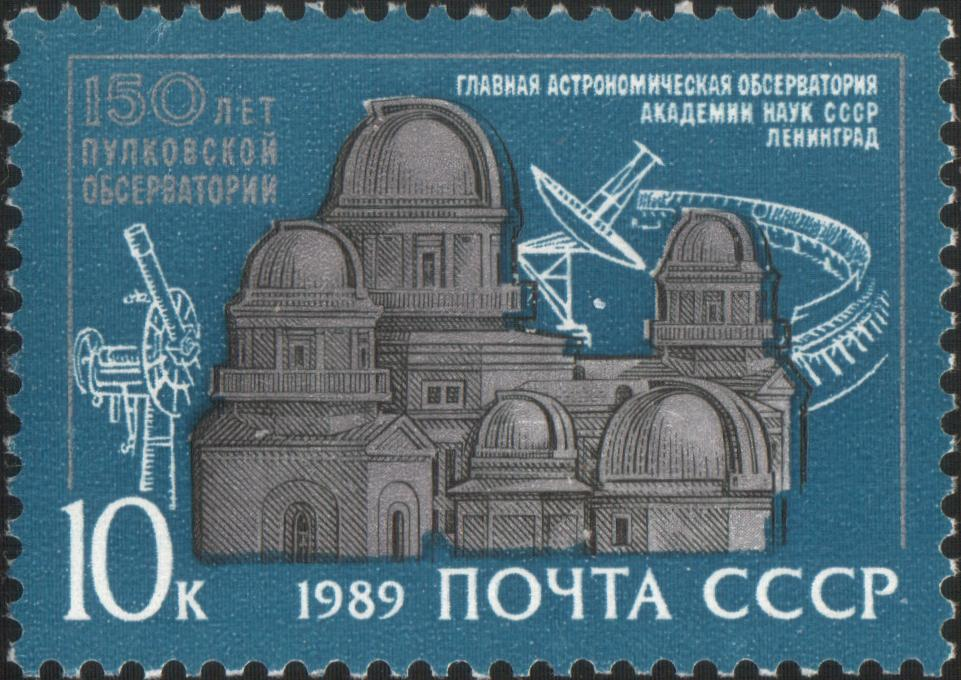
Soviet post stamp on occasion of 150th anniversary of the observatory

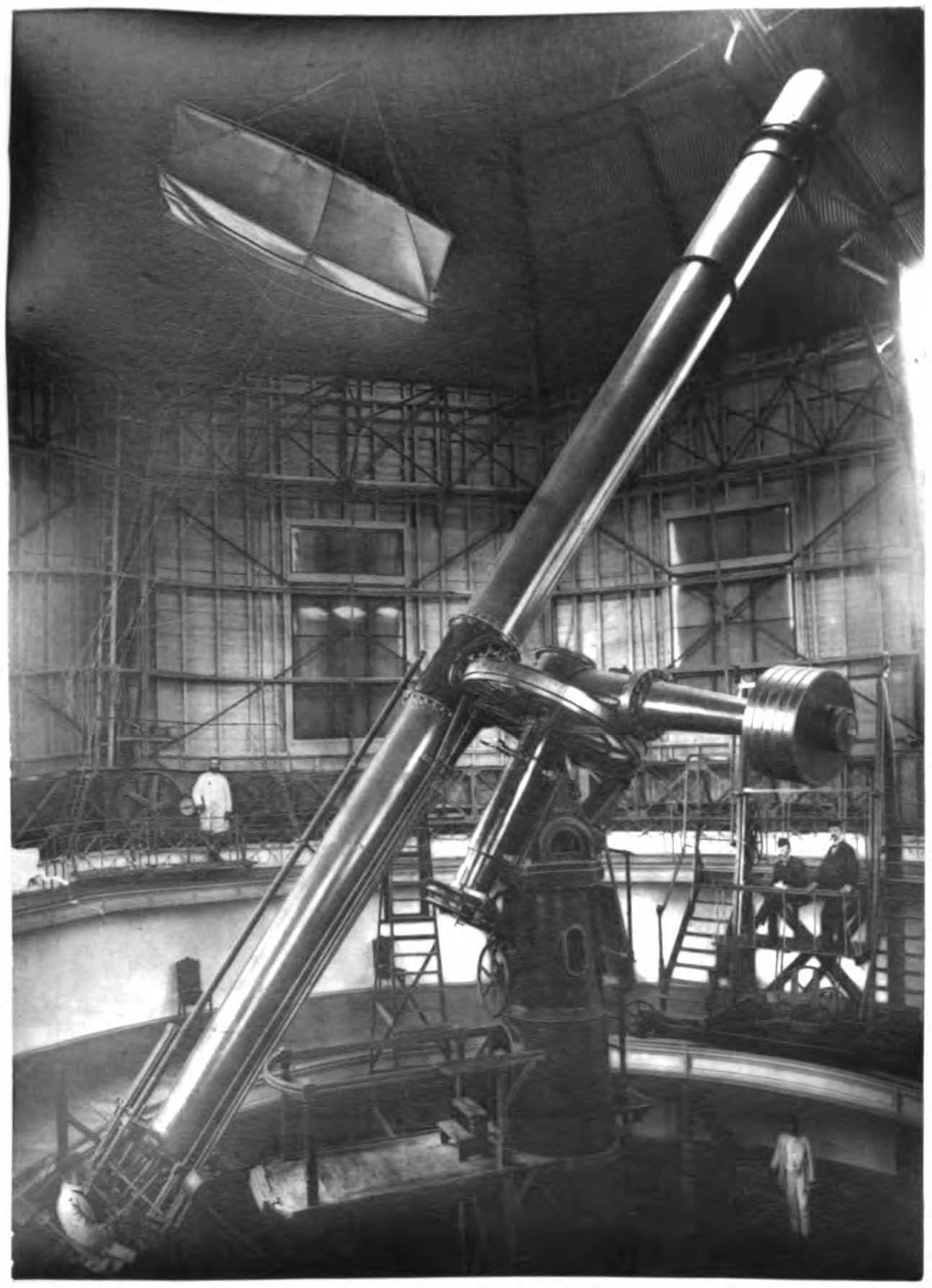
The 30 inch (76 cm) refractor, installed in 1885, was one of the largest telescopes in the world at that time

== Directors ==
1. 1839–1862 Friedrich Georg Wilhelm von Struve
2. 1862–1889 Otto Wilhelm von Struve
3. 1890–1895 Fyodor Aleksandrovich Bredikhin
4. 1895–1916 Oskar Backlund
5. 1916–1919 Aristarkh Belopolsky
6. 1919–1930 Alexandr Alexandrovich Ivanov
7. 1933–1937 Boris Gerasimovich
8. 1937–1944 Sergey Belyavsky
9. 1944–1946 Grigory Neujmin
10. 1947–1964 Aleksandr Aleksandrovich Mikhailov
11. 1964–1979 Vladimir Alekseevich Krat
12. 1979–1982 Kiril Nikolaevich Tavastsherna
13. 1983–2000 Viktor Kuzmich Abalakin
14. 2000–2015 Alexandr Vladimirovich Stepanov
15. 2015–2016 Yury Anatol'evich Nagovizyin
16. since 2016 Nazar Robertovich Ikhsanov

== See also ==
- List of Russian astronomers and astrophysicists
